= List of parliamentary constituencies of Zambia =

National Assembly of Zambia

Type
- Type: Unicameral
- Seats: 167 (156 elected members + the Vice President and 10 Presidential appointees)

Elections
- Voting system: First past the post
- Last election: 12 August 2021

Meeting place
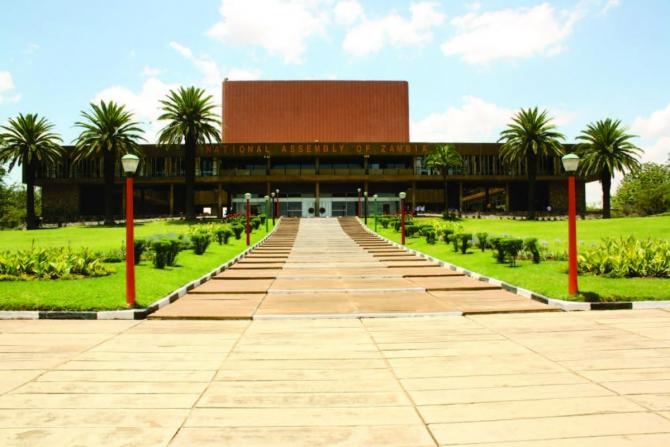
- Zambian National Assembly building

Website
- www.parliament.gov.zm

Location of Zambia within Africa

The National Assembly is the unicameral legislature of Zambia, a landlocked country in southern Africa, east of Angola. The seat of the assembly is at the capital of the country, Lusaka, and it is presided over by a Speaker and two deputy Speakers. The term of the assembly is five years, unless it is dissolved early. The National Assembly has existed since 1964, before which it was known as the Legislative Council.

Since 2016, the assembly has had 167 members. Of those, 156 are elected by the first-past-the-post system in single-member constituencies, a further eight are appointed by the President, and three others are ex officio members: the Vice President, the Speaker, and one of the deputy speakers. (Note: One of the deputy speakers is elected from outside the National Assembly, while the other is chosen from among the elected members of the house.) The constitution mandates that the constituencies are delimited after every census by the Electoral Commission of Zambia. During delimitation, the commission ensures that constituencies are wholly within districts, while considering other factors like the "history, diversity and cohesiveness of the constituency".

== History ==
History of the Zambian National Assembly constituencies
Year	Details	Elected constituencies	Elections
1964	Zambia gained independence from the United Kingdom and the Legislative Council of Northern Rhodesia was renamed as the National Assembly of Zambia.	75	–
1967	A constitutional amendment led to the National Assembly comprising 105 constituencies	105	1968
1973	Zambia became a one-party state after the enacting of the 1973 constitution. The number of constituencies was increased to 125.	125	1973, 1978, 1983 and 1988
1990, 1991	Zambia returned to being a multi-party democracy in 1990 and the number of constituencies was increased to 150, in 1991.	150	1991 1996, 2001, 2006 and 2011
2016	There was an amendment to the constitution whereby the number of constituencies was increased to 156.	156	2016 and 2021
2026	There was an amendment to the constitution whereby the number of constituencies was increased to 226.	226	

== Constituencies (since 2026) ==
Constituencies of the National Assembly of Zambia (from 2026)
No.	Name	Province	District
1	Katuba	Central	Chibombo
2	Keembe West	Central	Chibombo
3	Keembe East	Central	Chibombo
4	Chisamba	Central	Chisamba
5	Mwomboshi	Central	Chisamba
6	Chitambo	Central	Chitambo
7	Bwacha North	Central	Kabwe
8	Bwacha South	Central	Kabwe
9	Kabwe Central	Central	Kabwe
10	Kapiri Mposhi West	Central	Kapiri Mposhi
11	Kapiri Mposhi East	Central	Kapiri Mposhi
12	Luano	Central	Luano
13	Mkushi North	Central	Mkushi
14	Mkushi South	Central	Mkushi
15	Mumbwa Central	Central	Mumbwa
16	Mumbwa West	Central	Mumbwa
17	Nangoma	Central	Mumbwa
18	Lufubu	Central	Ngabwe
19	Muchinga	Central	Serenje
20	Serenje	Central	Serenje
21	Nkundalila	Central	Serenje
22	Mwembeshi West	Central	Shibuyunji
23	Mwembeshi East	Central	Shibuyunji
24	Chililabombwe	Copperbelt	Chililabombwe
25	Konkola	Copperbelt	Chililabombwe
26	Chingola Central	Copperbelt	Chingola
27	Chingola West	Copperbelt	Chingola
28	Nchanga	Copperbelt	Chingola
29	Kalulushi	Copperbelt	Kalulushi
30	Chambishi	Copperbelt	Kalulushi
31	Chimwemwe	Copperbelt	Kitwe
32	Kamfinsa	Copperbelt	Kitwe
33	Kwacha	Copperbelt	Kitwe
34	Nkana	Copperbelt	Kitwe
35	Wusakile	Copperbelt	Kitwe
36	Luanshya	Copperbelt	Luanshya
37	Roan	Copperbelt	Luanshya
38	Lufwanyama East	Copperbelt	Lufwanyama
39	Lufwanyama West	Copperbelt	Lufwanyama
40	Kafulafuta	Copperbelt	Masaiti
41	Kalalangabo	Copperbelt	Masaiti
42	Masaiti	Copperbelt	Masaiti
43	Mpongwe West	Copperbelt	Mpongwe
44	Mpongwe East	Copperbelt	Mpongwe
45	Kankoyo	Copperbelt	Mufulira
46	Kantanshi	Copperbelt	Mufulira
47	Mufulira	Copperbelt	Mufulira
48	Bwana Mkubwa	Copperbelt	Ndola
49	Chifubu	Copperbelt	Ndola
50	Dag Hammarskjöld	Copperbelt	Ndola
51	Kabushi	Copperbelt	Ndola
52	Ndola Central	Copperbelt	Ndola
53	Chadiza West	Eastern	Chadiza
54	Chadiza East	Eastern	Chadiza
55	Chipangali West	Eastern	Chipangali
56	Chipangali East	Eastern	Chipangali
57	Chipata Central	Eastern	Chipata
58	Chipata North	Eastern	Chipata
59	Luangeni	Eastern	Chipata
60	Kasenengwa	Eastern	Kasenengwa
61	Milanzi	Eastern	Katete
62	Mkaika	Eastern	Katete
63	Chasefu South	Eastern	Chasefu
64	Chasefu North	Eastern	Chasefu
65	Lumezi North	Eastern	Lumezi
66	Lumezi South	Eastern	Lumezi
67	Lundazi	Eastern	Lundazi
68	Malambo West	Eastern	Mambwe
69	Malambo East	Eastern	Mambwe
70	Nyimba North	Eastern	Nyimba
71	Nyimba South	Eastern	Nyimba
72	Kaumbwe	Eastern	Petauke
73	Petauke Central	Eastern	Petauke
74	Msanzala	Eastern	Lusangazi
75	Lusangazi Central	Eastern	Lusangazi
76	Kapoche	Eastern	Sinda
77	Sinda	Eastern	Sinda
78	Vubwi	Eastern	Vubwi
79	Chama North	Eastern	Chama
80	Chama Central	Eastern	Chama
81	Chama South	Eastern	Chama
82	Chembe	Luapula	Chembe
83	Chiengi	Luapula	Chiengi
84	Kalungwishi	Luapula	Chiengi
85	Chipili	Luapula	Chipili
86	Kawambwa	Luapula	Kawambwa
87	Luongo	Luapula	Kawambwa
88	Pambashe	Luapula	Kawambwa
89	Luapula	Luapula	Lunga
90	Bahati	Luapula	Mansa
91	Mansa West	Luapula	Mansa
92	Mansa East	Luapula	Mansa
93	Milenge	Luapula	Milenge
94	Mwansabombwe	Luapula	Mwansabombwe
95	Mambilima	Luapula	Mwense
96	Mwense	Luapula	Mwense
97	Nchelenge	Luapula	Nchelenge
98	Mweru	Luapula	Nchelenge
99	Bangweulu	Luapula	Samfya
100	Chifunabuli South	Luapula	Chifunabuli
101	Chifunabuli North	Luapula	Chifunabuli
102	Chilanga South	Lusaka	Chilanga
103	Chilanga North	Lusaka	Chilanga
104	Chongwe West	Lusaka	Chongwe
105	Chongwe East	Lusaka	Chongwe
106	Kafue West	Lusaka	Kafue
107	Kafue East	Lusaka	Kafue
108	Feira	Lusaka	Luangwa
109	Chawama	Lusaka	Lusaka
110	Kabwata	Lusaka	Lusaka
111	Kanyama	Lusaka	Lusaka
112	Makeni	Lusaka	Lusaka
113	Lusaka Central	Lusaka	Lusaka
114	Mandevu	Lusaka	Lusaka
115	Lima	Lusaka	Lusaka
116	Matero	Lusaka	Lusaka
117	Roma	Lusaka	Lusaka
118	Munali	Lusaka	Lusaka
119	Rufunsa	Lusaka	Rufunsa
120	Chinsali	Muchinga	Chinsali
121	Chilinda	Muchinga	Chinsali
122	Isoka	Muchinga	Isoka
123	Nkombwa	Muchinga	Isoka
124	Mafinga North	Muchinga	Mafinga
125	Mafinga South	Muchinga	Mafinga
126	Kanchibiya	Muchinga	Kanchibiya
127	Lwitikila	Muchinga	Kanchibiya
128	Mfuwe	Muchinga	Lavushimanda
129	Mpika North	Muchinga	Mpika
130	Mpika South	Muchinga	Mpika
131	Nakonde	Muchinga	Nakonde
132	Mwenzo	Muchinga	Nakonde
133	Shiwa Ng'andu	Muchinga	Shiwa Ng'andu
134	Chilubi	Northern	Chilubi
135	Kaputa	Northern	Kaputa
136	Kundabwika	Northern	Kaputa
137	Kasama Central	Northern	Kasama
138	Kasama North	Northern	Kasama
139	Lukashya	Northern	Kasama
140	Luwingu Central	Northern	Luwingu
141	Lubansenshi	Northern	Luwingu
142	Lupososhi	Northern	Lupososhi
143	Mbala	Northern	Mbala
144	Saise	Northern	Mbala
145	Senga Hill	Northern	Senga Hill
146	Lunte	Northern	Lunte
147	Mporokoso	Northern	Mporokoso
148	Mpulungu North	Northern	Mpulungu
149	Mpulungu South	Northern	Mpulungu
150	Malole	Northern	Mungwi
151	Mpanda	Northern	Mungwi
152	Chimbamilonga	Northern	Nsama
153	Chavuma	North-Western	Chavuma
154	Ikeleng'i	North-Western	Ikelenge
155	Kabompo East	North-Western	Kabompo
156	Kabompo West	North-Western	Kabompo
157	Kasempa	North-Western	Kasempa
158	Mufwashi	North-Western	Kasempa
159	Manyinga	North-Western	Manyinga
160	Mufumbwe	North-Western	Mufumbwe
161	Dongwe	North-Western	Mufumbwe
162	Mwinilunga West	North-Western	Mwinilunga
163	Mwinilunga East	North-Western	Mwinilunga
164	Solwezi Central	North-Western	Solwezi
165	Solwezi North	North-Western	Solwezi
166	Solwezi East	North-Western	Mushindamo
167	Kalumbila	North-Western	Kalumbila
168	Lumwana	North-Western	Kalumbila
169	Zambezi East	North-Western	Zambezi
170	Zambezi Central	North-Western	Zambezi
171	Zambezi West	North-Western	Zambezi
172	Chikankata	Southern	Chikankata
173	Choma Central	Southern	Choma
174	Choma South	Southern	Choma
175	Mbabala	Southern	Choma
176	Gwembe	Southern	Gwembe
177	Dundumwenzi	Southern	Kalomo
178	Kalomo Central	Southern	Kalomo
179	Kalomo South	Southern	Kalomo
180	Kazungula South	Southern	Kazungula
181	Kazungula North	Southern	Kazungula
182	Livingstone Central	Southern	Livingstone
183	Maramba	Southern	Livingstone
184	Magoye West	Southern	Mazabuka
185	Magoye East	Southern	Mazabuka
186	Mazabuka Central	Southern	Mazabuka
187	Bweengwa	Southern	Monze
188	Monze Central	Southern	Monze
189	Monze East	Southern	Monze
190	Moomba	Southern	Monze
191	Namwala West	Southern	Namwala
192	Namwala East	Southern	Namwala
193	Itezhi-Tezhi West	Southern	Itezhi-Tezhi
194	Itezhi-Tezhi East	Southern	Itezhi-Tezhi
195	Pemba	Southern	Pemba
196	Siavonga	Southern	Siavonga
197	Chirundu	Southern	Chirundu
198	Sinazongwe	Southern	Sinazongwe
199	Kariba	Southern	Sinazongwe
200	Mapatizya	Southern	Zimba
201	Kalabo Central	Western	Kalabo
202	Kalabo South	Western	Kalabo
203	Liuwa	Western	Kalabo
204	Kaoma Central	Western	Kaoma
205	Mangango	Western	Kaoma
206	Luena	Western	Limulunga
207	Luampa East	Western	Luampa
208	Luampa West	Western	Luampa
209	Lukulu North	Western	Lukulu
210	Lukulu South	Western	Lukulu
211	Mitete	Western	Mitete
212	Mongu Central	Western	Mongu
213	Mongu East	Western	Mongu
214	Nalikwanda	Western	Mongu
215	Mulobezi	Western	Mulobezi
216	Mwandi	Western	Mwandi
217	Nalolo	Western	Nalolo
218	Nkeyema	Western	Nkeyema
219	Senanga South	Western	Senanga
220	Senanga North	Western	Senanga
221	Sesheke East	Western	Sesheke
222	Sesheke West	Western	Sesheke
223	Shang'ombo North	Western	Shang'ombo
224	Shang'ombo South	Western	Shang'ombo
225	Sikongo	Western	Sikongo
226	Sioma	Western	Sioma

== Constituencies (until 2026) ==
Map of the Zambian National Assembly constituencies (prior to 2026)

Constituencies of the National Assembly of Zambia
No.	Name	Province	District	Electorate (2021)
1	Katuba	Central	Chibombo	53,786
2	Keembe	Central	Chibombo	49,033
3	Chisamba	Central	Chisamba	40,632
4	Chitambo	Central	Chitambo	26,599
5	Itezhi-Tezhi	Southern	Itezhi-Tezhi	39,641
6	Bwacha	Central	Kabwe	51,456
7	Kabwe Central	Central	Kabwe	66,497
8	Kapiri Mposhi	Central	Kapiri Mposhi	89,852
9	Mkushi South	Central	Luano	22,814
10	Mkushi North	Central	Mkushi	54,487
11	Mumbwa	Central	Mumbwa	49,039
12	Nangoma	Central	Mumbwa	26,351
13	Lufubu	Central	Ngabwe	11,411
14	Muchinga	Central	Serenje	20,272
15	Serenje	Central	Serenje	29,728
16	Chililabombwe	Copperbelt	Chililabombwe	54,893
17	Chingola	Copperbelt	Chingola	69,793
18	Nchanga	Copperbelt	Chingola	47,276
19	Kalulushi	Copperbelt	Kalulushi	65,297
20	Chimwemwe	Copperbelt	Kitwe	60,323
21	Kamfinsa	Copperbelt	Kitwe	47,496
22	Kwacha	Copperbelt	Kitwe	64,145
23	Nkana	Copperbelt	Kitwe	53,157
24	Wusakile	Copperbelt	Kitwe	45,993
25	Luanshya	Copperbelt	Luanshya	53,883
26	Roan	Copperbelt	Luanshya	31,801
27	Lufwanyama	Copperbelt	Lufwanyama	35,878
28	Kafulafuta	Copperbelt	Masaiti	21,459
29	Masaiti	Copperbelt	Masaiti	30,361
30	Mpongwe	Copperbelt	Mpongwe	44,494
31	Kankoyo	Copperbelt	Mufulira	20,498
32	Kantanshi	Copperbelt	Mufulira	30,551
33	Mufulira	Copperbelt	Mufulira	32,424
34	Bwana Mkubwa	Copperbelt	Ndola	53,610
35	Chifubu	Copperbelt	Ndola	50,639
36	Kabushi	Copperbelt	Ndola	49,908
37	Ndola Central	Copperbelt	Ndola	62,018
38	Chadiza	Eastern	Chadiza	44,779
39	Chipangali	Eastern	Chipangali	70,113
40	Chipata Central	Eastern	Chipata	82,550
41	Kasenengwa	Eastern	Kasenengwa	52,697
42	Luangeni	Eastern	Chipata	39,883
43	Milanzi	Eastern	Katete	33,535
44	Mkaika	Eastern	Katete	47,017
45	Chasefu	Eastern	Chasefu	58,847
46	Lumezi	Eastern	Lumezi	53,451
47	Lundazi	Eastern	Lundazi	66,972
48	Malambo	Eastern	Mambwe	45,130
49	Nyimba	Eastern	Nyimba	53,277
50	Kaumbwe	Eastern	Petauke	30,509
51	Msanzala	Eastern	Lusangazi	41,500
52	Petauke Central	Eastern	Petauke	70,112
53	Kapoche	Eastern	Sinda	44,696
54	Sinda	Eastern	Sinda	33,346
55	Vubwi	Eastern	Vubwi	27,925
56	Chembe	Luapula	Chembe	18,594
57	Chiengi	Luapula	Chiengi	64,890
58	Chipili	Luapula	Chipili	19,729
59	Kawambwa	Luapula	Kawambwa	27,885
60	Pambashe	Luapula	Kawambwa	20,952
61	Luapula	Luapula	Lunga	17,353
62	Bahati	Luapula	Mansa	47,919
63	Mansa Central	Luapula	Mansa	73,471
64	Milenge	Luapula	Milenge	22,191
65	Mwansabombwe	Luapula	Mwansabombwe	27,778
66	Mambilima	Luapula	Mwense	23,078
67	Mwense	Luapula	Mwense	31,937
68	Nchelenge	Luapula	Nchelenge	71,866
69	Bangweulu	Luapula	Samfya	57,856
70	Chifunabuli	Luapula	Chifunabuli	41,504
71	Chilanga	Lusaka	Chilanga	72,409
72	Chirundu	Southern	Chirundu	30,012
73	Chongwe	Lusaka	Chongwe	94,677
74	Kafue	Lusaka	Kafue	78,765
75	Feira	Lusaka	Luangwa	14,288
76	Chawama	Lusaka	Lusaka	92,879
77	Kabwata	Lusaka	Lusaka	108,729
78	Kanyama	Lusaka	Lusaka	177,495
79	Lusaka Central	Lusaka	Lusaka	93,367
80	Mandevu	Lusaka	Lusaka	162,419
81	Matero	Lusaka	Lusaka	141,668
82	Munali	Lusaka	Lusaka	151,573
83	Rufunsa	Lusaka	Rufunsa	25,338
84	Mwembeshi	Central	Shibuyunji	35,002
85	Chama North	Eastern	Chama	30,963
86	Chama South	Eastern	Chama	22,150
87	Chinsali	Muchinga	Chinsali	53,782
88	Isoka	Muchinga	Isoka	39,050
89	Mafinga	Muchinga	Mafinga	39,385
90	Kanchibiya	Muchinga	Kanchibiya	34,848
91	Mfuwe	Muchinga	Lavushimanda	20,882
92	Mpika Central	Muchinga	Mpika	62,187
93	Nakonde	Muchinga	Nakonde	63,178
94	Shiwa Ng'andu	Muchinga	Shiwa Ng'andu	35,233
95	Chilubi	Northern	Chilubi	52,175
96	Kaputa	Northern	Kaputa	39,084
97	Kasama Central	Northern	Kasama	69,295
98	Lukashya	Northern	Kasama	64,397
99	Lubansenshi	Northern	Luwingu	38,753
100	Lupososhi	Northern	Lupososhi	29,587
101	Mbala	Northern	Mbala	54,086
102	Senga Hill	Northern	Senga Hill	44,543
103	Lunte	Northern	Lunte	27,462
104	Mporokoso	Northern	Mporokoso	25,006
105	Mpulungu	Northern	Mpulungu	54,723
106	Malole	Northern	Mungwi	78,633
107	Chimbamilonga	Northern	Nsama	28,602
108	Chavuma	North-Western	Chavuma	20,597
109	Ikeleng'i	North-Western	Ikelenge	18,441
110	Kabompo	North-Western	Kabompo	25,018
111	Kasempa	North-Western	Kasempa	35,345
112	Manyinga	North-Western	Manyinga	24,984
113	Mufumbwe	North-Western	Mufumbwe	32,070
114	Mwinilunga	North-Western	Mwinilunga	48,188
115	Solwezi Central	North-Western	Solwezi	76,377
116	Solwezi East	North-Western	Mushindamo	19,968
117	Solwezi West	North-Western	Kalumbila	47,696
118	Zambezi East	North-Western	Zambezi	26,317
119	Zambezi West	North-Western	Zambezi	11,676
120	Chikankata	Southern	Chikankata	36,812
121	Choma	Southern	Choma	73,593
122	Mbabala	Southern	Choma	31,536
123	Gwembe	Southern	Gwembe	27,583
124	Dundumwenzi	Southern	Kalomo	33,197
125	Kalomo Central	Southern	Kalomo	51,767
126	Katombola	Southern	Kazungula	54,926
127	Livingstone	Southern	Livingstone	78,470
128	Magoye	Southern	Mazabuka	30,849
129	Mazabuka Central	Southern	Mazabuka	58,954
130	Bweengwa	Southern	Monze	24,946
131	Monze Central	Southern	Monze	59,661
132	Moomba	Southern	Monze	16,895
133	Namwala	Southern	Namwala	44,566
134	Pemba	Southern	Pemba	34,403
135	Siavonga	Southern	Siavonga	26,265
136	Sinazongwe	Southern	Sinazongwe	61,656
137	Mapatizya	Southern	Zimba	35,988
138	Kalabo Central	Western	Kalabo	26,255
139	Liuwa	Western	Kalabo	14,595
140	Kaoma Central	Western	Kaoma	29,611
141	Mangango	Western	Kaoma	16,992
142	Luena	Western	Limulunga	22,278
143	Luampa	Western	Luampa	21,663
144	Lukulu East	Western	Lukulu	29,661
145	Mitete	Western	Mitete	14,130
146	Mongu Central	Western	Mongu	51,870
147	Nalikwanda	Western	Mongu	16,597
148	Mulobezi	Western	Mulobezi	14,729
149	Mwandi	Western	Mwandi	14,049
150	Nalolo	Western	Nalolo	23,436
151	Nkeyema	Western	Nkeyema	26,867
152	Senanga	Western	Senanga	33,710
153	Sesheke	Western	Sesheke	25,499
154	Shang'ombo	Western	Shang'ombo	26,578
155	Sikongo	Western	Sikongo	18,973
156	Sioma	Western	Sioma	19,800

== See also ==
- Elections in Zambia
