= List of members of the National Assembly of Zambia (2021–2026) =

The members of the National Assembly of Zambia from 2021 until 2026 were elected in the 2021 Zambian general election.

== Leadership ==
Presiding Officers
Name	Office	Party
Nelly Mutti	Speaker	
Malungo Chisangano	First Deputy Speaker	United Party for National Development
Moses Moyo	Second Deputy Speaker	Independent
Whips
Name	Office	
Stafford Mulusa	Government Chief Whip	
Robert Chabinga	Leader of the Opposition	
Princess Kasune	Deputy Chief Whip	

== Members ==
Constituency	Member	DOB	Party	Portfolio	Notes
Bahati	Leevan Chibombwe		Patriotic Front		
Bangweulu	Anthony Kasandwe	2 September 1969	Patriotic Front	Backbencher	
Bwacha	Sydney Mushanga	26 April 1977	Patriotic Front	Backbencher	
Bwana Mkubwa	Warren Chisha Mwambazi	18 December 1978	Independent	Backbencher	
Bweengwa	Kasautu Saiti Michelo	7 August 1974	United Party for National Development	Backbencher	
Chadiza	Jonathan Daka	13 March 1976	Patriotic Front	Backbencher	
Chama North	Yotam Mtayachalo	20 October 1968	Patriotic Front	Backbencher	
Chama South	Davison Mung`andu	19 June 1981	Patriotic Front	Backbencher	
Chasefu	Misheck Nyambose	1 April 1959	Independent	Backbencher	
Chavuma	Victor Lumayi	28 March 1978	United Party for National Development	Backbencher	
Chawama	Tasila Lungu	10 May 1983	Patriotic Front	Backbencher	
Chembe	Cliff Mpundu	11 August 1974	Patriotic Front	Backbencher	
Chiengi	Given Katuta Mwelwa	6 March 1969	Independent	Backbencher	
Chifubu	Lloyd Lubozha	9 March 1970	United Party for National Development	Backbencher	
Chifunabuli	Julien Mfwanki Nyemba	31 August 1962	Patriotic Front	Backbencher	
Chikankata	Jaqueline Sabao	27 September 1975	United Party for National Development	Backbencher	
Chilanga	Sipho Hlazo	11 April 1986	United Party for National Development	Backbencher	
Chililabombwe	Paul Kabuswe	8 October 1973	United Party for National Development	Minister of Mines and Mineral Development	
Chilubi	Mulenga Francis Fube	8 August 1975	Patriotic Front	Backbencher	
Chimbamilonga	Elias Makasa Musonda	2 December 1955	Patriotic Front	Backbencher	
Chimwemwe	Allen Banda		Patriotic Front	Backbencher	
Chingola	Chipoka Mulenga	10 November 1981	United Party for National Development	Minister of Commerce, Trade, and Industry	
Chinsali	Kalalwe Andrew Mukosa	9 June 1984	Patriotic Front	Backbencher	
Chipangali	Andrew Zindhlu Lubusha	3 February 1984	Patriotic Front	Backbencher	
Chipata Central	Reuben Mtolo Phiri	11 November 1964	United Party for National Development	Minister of Agriculture	
Chipili	Paul Chala		Patriotic Front	Backbencher	
Chirundu	Douglas Munsaka Syakalima	25 March 1967	United Party for National Development	Minister of Education	
Chisamba	Chushi C Kasanda	15 February 1978	United Party for National Development	Minister of Information and Media (September 2021 to September 2023)	
Chitambo	Remember Chanda Mutale	28 November 1976	Patriotic Front	Backbencher	
Choma	Cornelius Mweetwa	26 February 1976	United Party for National Development	Provincial Minister of Southern Province (September 2021 to September 2023); Minister of Information and Media	
Chongwe	Sylvia Masebo	7 March 1963	United Party for National Development	Minister of Health (September 2021 to July 2024); Minister of Lands and Natural Resources	
Dundumwenzi	Edgar Sing’ombe	4 April 1970	United Party for National Development	Backbencher	
Feira	Emmanuel Tembo		Patriotic Front	Backbencher	
Gwembe	Tyson Simuzingili	21 May 1962	United Party for National Development	Backbencher	
Ikeleng'i	Elijah Julaki Muchima	26 May 1957	United Party for National Development	Minister of Lands and Natural Resources	
Isoka	Marjorie Nakaponda	25 September 1963	Patriotic Front	Backbencher	
Itezhi-Tezhi	Twaambo Elvis Mutinta	28 September 1983	United Party for National Development	Backbencher	
Kabompo	Ambrose Lwiji Lufuma	26 October 1957	United Party for National Development	Minister of Defense	
Kabushi	Bernard Kanengo	4 August 1983	United Party for National Development	Backbencher	
Kabwata	Andrew Tayengwa	3 March 1975	United Party for National Development	Backbencher	
Kabwe Central	Chrizoster Halwindi	22 January 1969	United Party for National Development	Backbencher	
Kafue	Mirriam Chinyama Chonya	25 January 1971	United Party for National Development	Backbencher	
Kafulafuta	Jeffrey Mulebwa	20 November 1962	Independent	Backbencher	
Kalabo Central	Chinga Miyutu	6 August 1962	United Party for National Development	Backbencher	
Kalomo Central	Harry Kamboni	15 February 1966	United Party for National Development	Backbencher	
Kalulushi	Kampamba S Mulenga	3 March 1976	Patriotic Front	Backbencher	
Kamfinsa	Christopher Chishimba Kang'ombe	25 December 1984	Patriotic Front	Backbencher	
Kanchibiya	Sunday Chanda	12 September 1976	Patriotic Front	Backbencher	
Kankoyo	Heartson Mabeta	4 July 1983	United Party for National Development	Backbencher	
Kantanshi	Anthony Chanda Mumba	21 February 1978	Patriotic Front	Backbencher	
Kanyama	Monty Chinkuli	19 November 1964	United Party for National Development	Backbencher	
Kaoma Central	Sitwala Morgan Sitwala	26 November 1958	United Party for National Development	Backbencher	
Kapiri Mposhi	Stanley Kasongo Kakubo	24 May 1980	United Party for National Development	Minister of Foreign Affairs and International Cooperation	
Kapoche	Luckson Mwaiwanu Lungu	1 January 1980	Patriotic Front	Backbencher	
Kaputa	Elvis Chishala Nkandu	31 December 1971	United Party for National Development	Minister of Youth, Sport and Arts	
Kasama Central	Sibongile Mwamba	11 July 1980	Patriotic Front	Backbencher	
Kasempa	Brenda Mwika Tambatamba	29 April 1961	United Party for National Development	Minister of Labour and Social Security	
Kasenengwa	Philimon Twasa	22 September 1972	Patriotic Front	Backbencher	
Katombola	Clement Andeleki	4 October 1974	United Party for National Development	Backbencher	
Katuba	Mwabashike Nkulukusa	22 August 1976	United Party for National Development	Backbencher	
Kaumbwe	Aaron Daniel Mwanza		Patriotic Front	Backbencher	
Kawambwa	Nickson Chilangwa	10 January 1969	Patriotic Front	Backbencher	
Keembe	Princess Kasune	12 November 1975	United Party for National Development	Deputy Chief Whip	
Kwacha	Charles Abel Mulenga	21 July 1965	United Party for National Development	Backbencher	
Liuwa	Situmbeko Musokotwane	25 May 1956	United Party for National Development	Party Whip, Minister of Finance and National Planning	
Livingstone	Rhodine Sikumba	29 March 1980	United Party for National Development	Minister of Tourism	
Luampa	Makozo Chikote	25 May 1975	United Party for National Development	Minister of Fisheries and Livestock	
Luangeni	Moses Moyo	16 August 1976	Independent	Second Deputy Speaker	
Luanshya	Lusale John Simbao	15 January 1964	United Party for National Development	Backbencher	
Luapula	Chanda Katotobwe	7 November 1968	Patriotic Front	Backbencher	
Lubansenshi	Kabwe Taulo Chewe	18 July 1951	Patriotic Front	Backbencher	
Luena	Mubita Anakoka	6 January 1970	United Party for National Development	Backbencher	
Lufubu	Wesley Kolala	17 November 1983	United Party for National Development	Backbencher	
Lufwanyama	Kenny Siachisumo	12 November 1964	United Party for National Development	Backbencher	
Lukashya	George Kangwa Chisanga	16 September 1966	Patriotic Front	Backbencher	
Lukulu East	Christopher Kalila Kalila	6 January 1966	United Party for National Development	Backbencher	
Lumezi	Munir Zulu	13 November 1987	Independent	Backbencher	
Lundazi	Brenda Nyirenda		Patriotic Front	Backbencher	
Lunte	Mutotwe L Kafwaya	28 August 1976	Patriotic Front	Backbencher	
Lupososhi	Emmanuel M M Musonda	25 September 1967	Patriotic Front	Backbencher	
Lusaka Central	Mulambo Hamakuni Haimbe	12 May 1976	United Party for National Development	Minister of Justice (September 2021 to May 2024); Minister of Foreign Affairs and International Cooperation	
Mafinga	Robert M Chabinga	1 January 1981	Patriotic Front	Backbencher	
Magoye	Mweemba Malambo	5 April 1975	United Party for National Development	Backbencher	
Malambo	Peter Phiri	18 February 1974	United Party for National Development	Provincial Minister of Eastern Province	
Malole	Robert Kaela Kalimi	15 October 1973	Patriotic Front	Backbencher	
Mambilima	Jean Ng'andwe Chisenga	1 October 1989	Patriotic Front	Backbencher	
Mandevu	Christopher Shakafuswa	4 August 1982	Patriotic Front	Backbencher	
Mangango	Luhamba Mwene	23 September 1979	United Party for National Development	Backbencher	
Mansa Central	Chitalu Chilufya	15 July 1972	Patriotic Front		
Manyinga	Robert Lihefu	1 January 1975	United Party for National Development	Provincial Minister for North-Western Province	
Mapatizya	Emeldah Munashabantu	3 January 1974	United Party for National Development	Backbencher	
Masaiti	Micheal Zondani Katambo	16 September 1969	Patriotic Front	Backbencher	
Matero	Miles Sampa	26 December 1970	Patriotic Front	Backbencher	
Mazabuka Central	Gary Nkombo	1 March 1965	United Party for National Development	Minister of Local Government and Rural Development	
Mbabala	Joseph Simumpuka Munsanje	14 February 1973	United Party for National Development	Backbencher	
Mbala	Njavwa Simutowe	3 November 1971	United Party for National Development	Backbencher	
Mfuwe	Maureen Mabonga	30 March 1984	Patriotic Front	Backbencher	
Milanzi	Melesiana Phiri	4 September 1977	Patriotic Front	Backbencher	
Milenge	Gystave Chonde	22 August 1974	Independent	Backbencher	
Mitete	Misheck Mutelo	11 July 1975	United Party for National Development	Backbencher	
Mkaika	Peter Phiri	4 May 1973	Patriotic Front	Backbencher	
Mkushi North	Christopher Chibuye	30 November 1970	Patriotic Front	Backbencher	
Mkushi South	Davies Chisopa	21 June 1973	Patriotic Front	Backbencher	
Mongu Central	Oliver Amutike	2 January 1975	United Party for National Development	Backbencher	
Monze	Jacob Jack Mwiimbu	23 July 1959	United Party for National Development	Minister of Home Affairs and International Security	
Moomba	Fred Chibulo Chaatila	6 March 1974	United Party for National Development	Backbencher	
Mpika	Francis Robert Kapyanga	19 September 1987	Patriotic Front	Backbencher	
Mpongwe	Gregory Ngowani		United Party for National Development	Backbencher	
Mporokoso	Brian Muntayalwa Mundubile	5 January 1971	United Party for National Development	Leader of the Opposition	
Mpulungu	Leonard Mbao	22 February 1980	United Party for National Development	Provincial Minister of Northern Province	
Msanzala	Elias Daka	19 September 1971	Patriotic Front	Backbencher	
Muchinga	Emmanuel Banda	10 July 1978	Independent	Backbencher	
Mufulira	Golden Mwila	17 December 1974	Patriotic Front	Backbencher	
Mufumbwe	Elliot Kamondo	30 August 1966	United Party for National Development	Backbencher	
Mulobezi	Raphael Samukoma Mabenga	2 April 1953	United Party for National Development	Backbencher	
Mumbwa	Credo Nanjuwa	11 September 1969	United Party for National Development	Provincial Minister of Central Province (September 2021 to September 2023); Provincial Minister of Southern Province	
Munali	Mike Mposha		United Party for National Development	Minister of Water Development and Sanitation (September 2021 to June 2024); Minister of Green Economy and Environment	
Mwandi	Sibeso K Sefulo	12 December 1982	United Party for National Development	Backbencher	
Mwansabombwe	Kabaso Kampampi	9 May 1976	Patriotic Front	Backbencher	
Mwembeshi	Machila Jamba	9 May 1972	United Party for National Development	Backbencher	
Mwense	David Mabumba	23 April 1971	Patriotic Front	Backbencher	
Mwinilunga	Newton Samakayi	8 August 1963	United Party for National Development	Backbencher	
Nakonde	Lukas Simumba		Patriotic Front	Backbencher	
Nalikwanda	Koonwa Simunji	25 January 1965	United Party for National Development	Backbencher	
Nalolo	Imanga Wamunyima	14 February 1992	Party of National Unity and Progress	Backbencher	
Namwala	Herbert Mapani		United Party for National Development	Backbencher	
Nangoma	Collins Nzovu		United Party for National Development	Minister of Green Economy and Environment (September 2021 to June 2024); Minister of Water Development and Sanitation	
Nchanga	Derricky Chilundika	16 March 1976	United Party for National Development	Provincial Minister - Luapula Province	
Nchelenge	Simon Mwale		Patriotic Front	Backbencher	
Ndola Central	Frank Tayali		United Party for National Development	Minister of Transport and Logistics	
Nkana	Binwell Mpundu	9 October 1982	Independent	Backbencher	
Nkeyema	Kapelwa Astley Mbangweta	16 October 1955	United Party for National Development	Provincial Minister for Western Province	
Nyimba	Menyani Zulu	21 September 1973	Independent	Backbencher	
Pambashe	Ronald Kaoma Chitotela	21 April 1972	Patriotic Front	Backbencher	
Pemba	Lameck Hamwaata	24 October 1976	United Party for National Development	Backbencher	
Petauke Central	Jay Emmanuel Banda	23 March 1985	Independent	Backbencher	
Roan	Joel Chibuye	8 August 1968	Independent	Backbencher	
Rufunsa	Sheal S. Mulyata	25 June 1960	United Party for National Development	Provincial Minister of Lusaka Province	
Senanga	Walusa Mulaliki	18 June 1982	United Party for National Development	Backbencher	
Senga Hill	Henry Sikazwe	3 January 1973	United Party for National Development	Provincial Minister for Muchinga Province	
Serenje	George Kasabila Kandafula	15 December 1965	Independent	Backbencher	
Sesheke	Romeo Kang'ombe	27 December 1987	United Party for National Development	Backbencher	
Shang'ombo	Mubika Mubika	20 August 1973	United Party for National Development	Backbencher	
Shiwa Ngandu	Stephen Kampyongo	12 June 1972	Patriotic Front	Backbencher	
Siavonga	Darius Mulunda	7 January 1969	United Party for National Development	Backbencher	
Sikongo	Mayungo Simushi		United Party for National Development	Backbencher	
Sinazongwe	Gift Simuunza Sialubalo	25 August 1969	United Party for National Development	Backbencher	
Sinda	Masautso K Tembo	29 March 1987	Patriotic Front	Backbencher	
Sioma	Kaliye Mandandi	9 April 1973	United Party for National Development	Backbencher	
Solwezi Central	Stafford Mulusa	5 February 1975	United Party for National Development	Government Chief Whip	
Solwezi East	Alex Katakwe	1 January 1974	United Party for National Development	Backbencher	
Solwezi West	Nicholas Muluka Mukumbi	11 April 1972	United Party for National Development	Backbencher	
Vubwi	Ackleo Aaron Banda	4 March 1986	Patriotic Front	Backbencher	
Wusakile	Pavyuma Kalobo	24 October 1976	Patriotic Front	Backbencher	
Zambezi East	Brian Kambita	4 February 1971	United Party for National Development	Backbencher	
Zambezi West	Vumango Pascal Musumali	9 July 1964	United Party for National Development	Backbencher	

=== Non-elected members ===
Type	Member	Party	Portfolio
Nominated	Charles Milupi	Alliance for Democracy and Development	Minister of Infrastructure, Housing and Urban Development
Nominated	Felix Mutati	Movement for Democratic Change	Minister of Technology and Science
Nominated	Peter Kapala	United Party for National Development	Minister of Energy
Nominated	Elias Mubanga	United Party for National Development	Minister of Small and Medium Enterprises Development
Nominated	Elisha Matambo	United Party for National Development	Provincial Minister for Copperbelt Province
Nominated	Mutinta C. Mazoka	United Party for National Development	
Nominated	Doreen Mwamba	United Party for National Development	Minister of Community Development and Social Services
Vice-President	Mutale Nalumango	United Party for National Development	
