= Chadiza =

- Town
- Location in Zambia
- Coordinates: 14°4′00″S 32°26′0″E
- Country: Zambia
- Province: Eastern Province
- District: Chadiza District
- Time zone: UTC+2 (CAT)

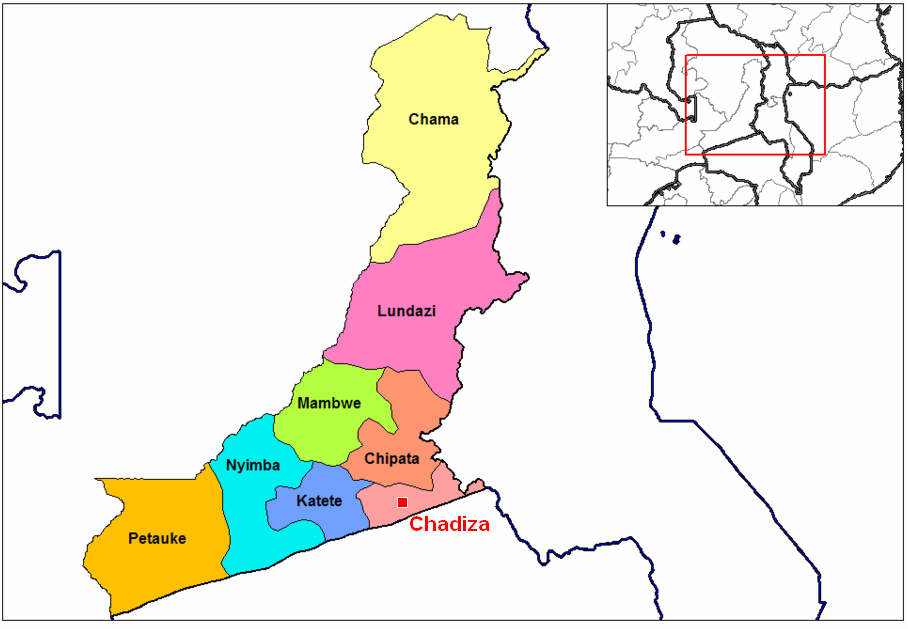
Location of Chadiza town and district in Eastern Province, Zambia

Chadiza is a town in the Eastern Province of Zambia. Its headquarters are located in Chadiza District. It lies 35 km south of the Great East Road and about 80 km south-south-west of Chipata, on a plateau (elevation 1050 m) studded by isolated rocky hills, between the middle Luangwa valley and the Zambezi. It is also 35 kilometres north-north-east of the Chimefusa Border (the main border crossing between Mozambique and Zambia).
