= Nkeyema =

Constituency of the National Assembly of Zambia

Nkeyema is a constituency of the National Assembly of Zambia. It was created in 2016. It covers Nkeyema District in Western Province.

== List of MPs ==
Election year	MP	Party
Nkeyema
2016	Kapelwa Mbangweta	United Party for National Development
2021	Kapelwa Mbangweta	United Party for National Development
2026	Kapelwa Mbangweta	United Party for National Development
