= Chipili District =

Coordinates: 10°25′S 29°00′E

- District
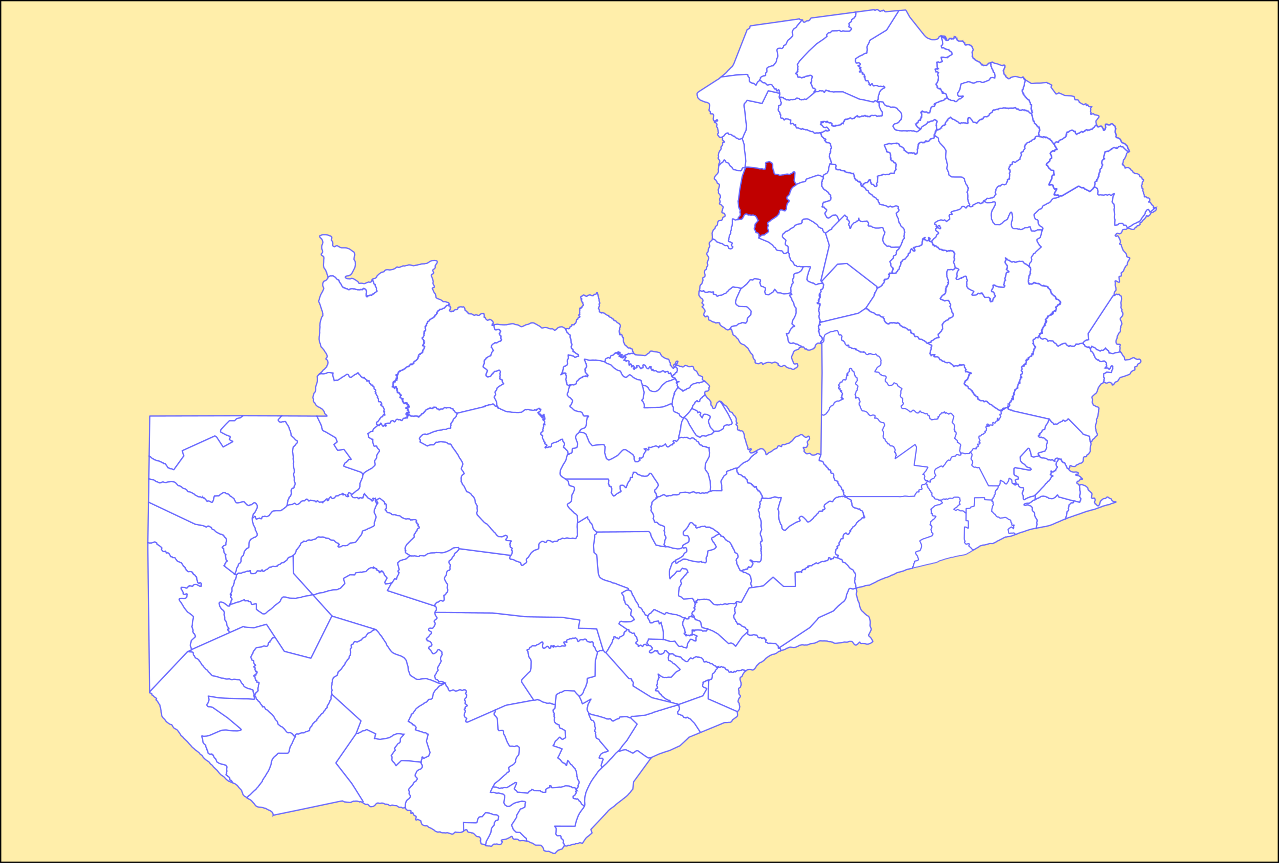
- District location in Zambia
- Country: Zambia
- Province: Luapula Province

Area
  - Total: 4,316.7 km^{2} (1,666.7 sq mi)

Population (2022)
  - Total: 47,210
  - Density: 10.94/km^{2} (28.33/sq mi)
- Time zone: UTC+2 (CAT)

Chipili District is a district of Zambia, located in Luapula Province. It was separated from Mwense District in 2012. As of the 2022 Zambian Census, the district had a population of 47,210 people.
