= Vubwi District =

Coordinates: 14°00′S 32°54′E

- District
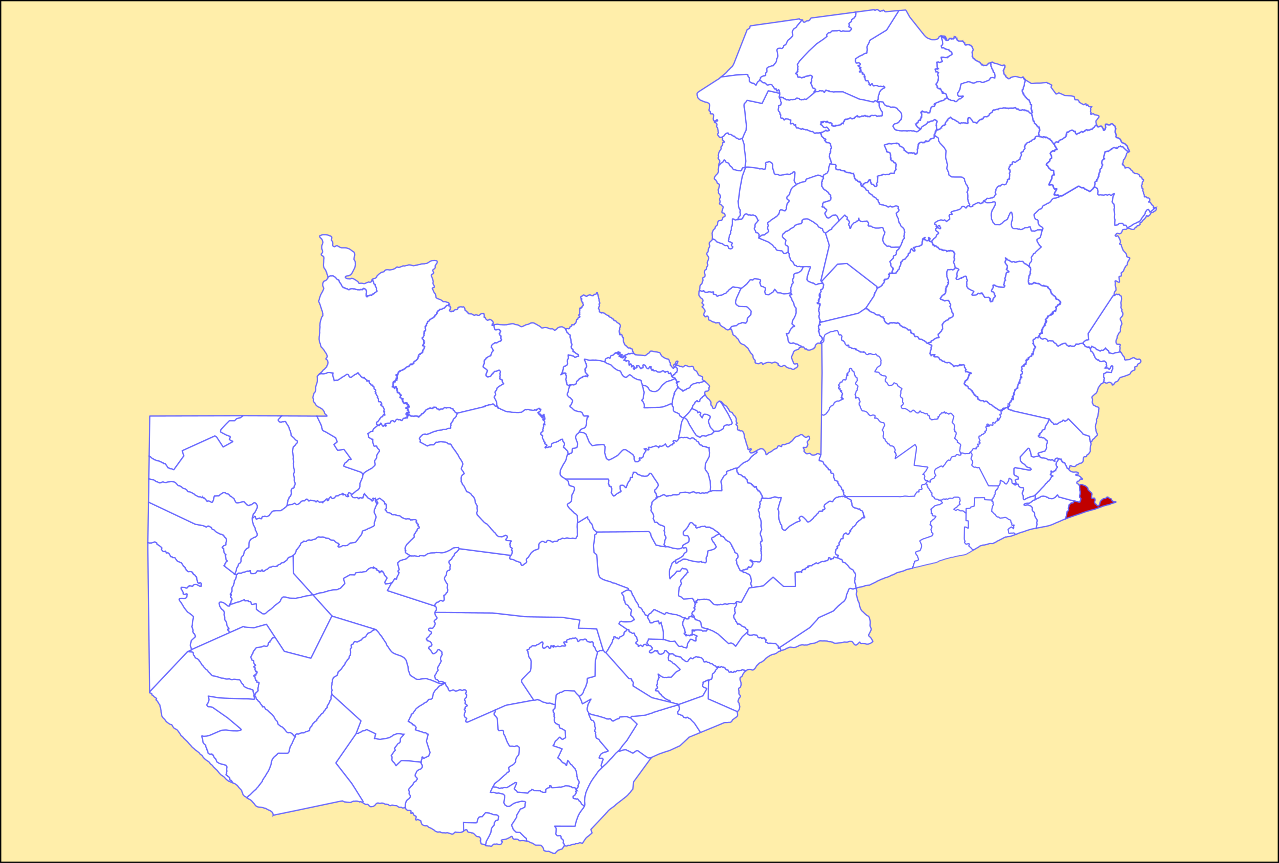
- District location in Zambia
- Country: Zambia
- Province: Eastern Province
- Parliamentary constituency: Vubwi

Area
  - Total: 981.7 km^{2} (379.0 sq mi)

Population (2022)
  - Total: 53,080
  - Density: 54.07/km^{2} (140.0/sq mi)
- Time zone: UTC+2 (CAT)

Vubwi District is a district of Zambia, located in the Eastern Province. It was separated from Chadiza District in 2012. As of the 2022 Zambian Census, the district had a population of 53,080 people.
