= Derricky Chilundika =

Zambian politician and cabinet minister

Provincial minister for Luapula Province
- In office September 2021 – August 2023
- President: Hakainde Hichilema
- Preceded by: Nickson Chilangwa
- Succeeded by: Njavwa Simutowe

Member of the National Assembly of Zambia
- In office August 2021 – May 2026
- Preceded by: Chilombo Chali
- Constituency: Nchanga

Personal details
- Born: March 16, 1976 (age 50) Zambia
- Party: UPND
- Spouse: Married
- Education: Cavendish University
- Occupation: Politician
- Profession: Teacher, Technician, Lawyer, politician

Derricky Chilundika (born 16 March 1976) is a Zambian politician and member of the United Party for National Development (UPND). He served as Provincial minister for Luapula Province from 2021 to 2023 and was the Member of Parliament for Nchanga Constituency in Chingola District from August 2021 to May 2026.

== Political career ==
Chilundika was elected to the National Assembly of Zambia during the 2021 Zambian general election as MP for Nchanga, under the United Party for National Development (UPND).

In September 2021, President Hakainde Hichilema appointed him as Provincial minister for Luapula Province. As minister, he championed infrastructure development, rural electrification, and job creation through agriculture and mining investments in the province.

However, in August 2023, Chilundika was dismissed from his ministerial role by President Hichilema over allegations of misconduct involving local government land administration in Mansa District.
