= Mulobezi District =

Coordinates: 15°00′S 22°30′E

- District
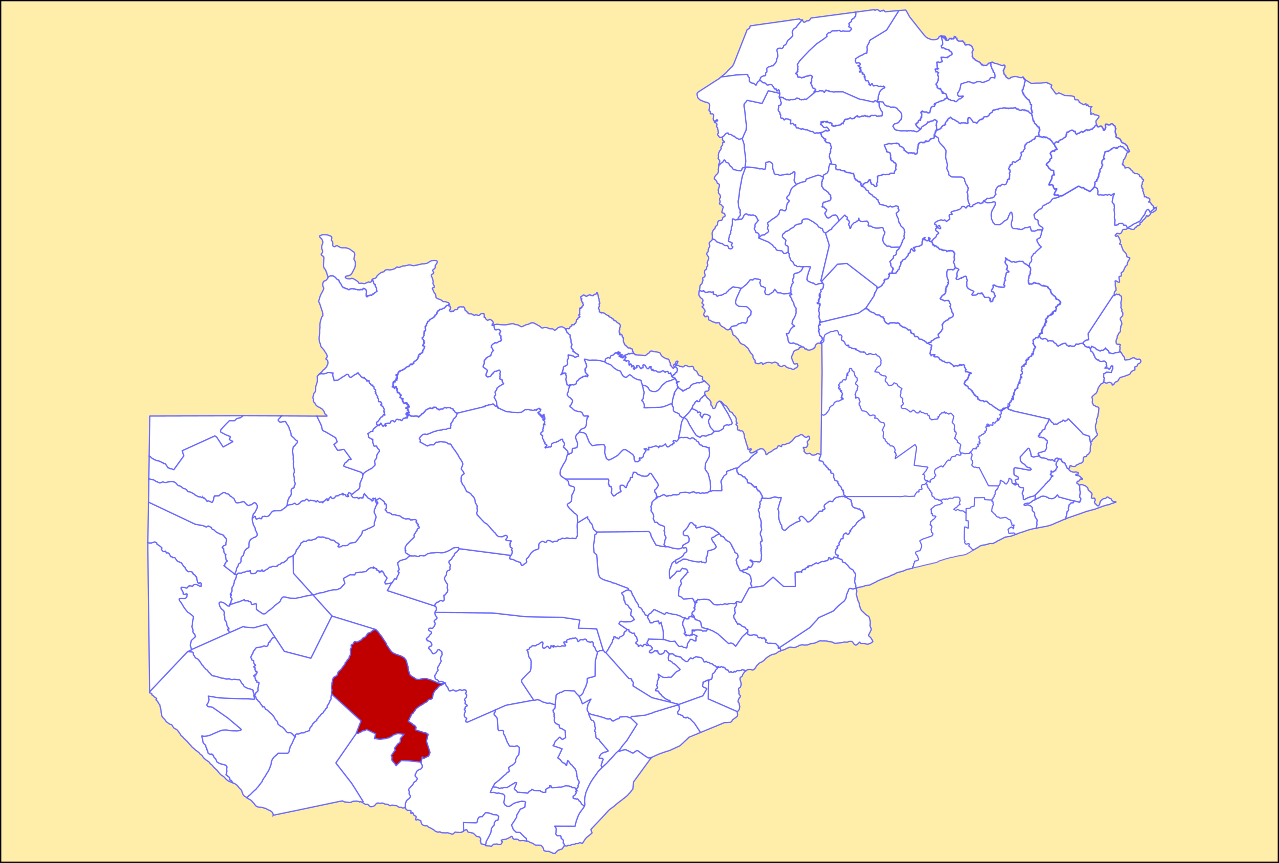
- District location in Zambia
- Country: Zambia
- Province: Western Province

Area
  - Total: 12,021.1 km^{2} (4,641.4 sq mi)

Population (2022)
  - Total: 45,326
  - Density: 3.7705/km^{2} (9.7656/sq mi)
- Time zone: UTC+2 (CAT)

Mulobezi District is a district of Zambia, located in Western Province. It was separated from Sesheke District in 2013. As of the 2022 Zambian Census, the district had a population of 45,326 people.
