= List of Zambian provinces by Human Development Index =

This is a list of Zambian provinces by Human Development Index as of 2023 without the 2011 created Muchinga Province.

Rank	Province	HDI (2023)
Medium human development
1	Lusaka	0.668
2	Copperbelt	0.661
3	North-Western	0.612
–	Zambia (average)	0.595
4	Southern	0.593
5	Central	0.589
Low human development
6	Northern	0.549
7	Western	0.545
8	Eastern	0.536
9	Luapula	0.524
