= Kapelwa Mbangweta =

Zambian politician and Member of Parliament

Hon. Kapelwa Mbangweta MP

Member of the National Assembly for Nkeyema
- Incumbent
- Assumed office August 2016
- Preceded by: Position created

Provincial minister for Western Province
- In office 17 September 2021 – 15 May 2026
- Preceded by: Richard Kapita

Personal details
- Born: October 16, 1955 (age 71) Zambia
- Party: United Party for National Development
- Spouse: Married
- Education: Bachelor of Arts in Public Administration
- Profession: Politician, human resources expert

Kapelwa Astley Mbangweta (born 16 October 1955) is a Zambian politician serving as the Member of the National Assembly for Nkeyema since 2016. He served as the Western Province provincial minister from 2021 to 2026. He is a member of the United Party for National Development (UPND).

== Political career ==
Nkeyema constituency was created at the 2016 general election and Mbangweta stood as the United Party for National Development candidate in the constituency at that election. Mbangweta was elected as the first MP for the new constituency and at the 2021 general election, he was re-elected as the Nkeyema member of parliament. In September 2021, he was appointed as the Provincial Minister for Western Province. At the 2026 general election, Mbangweta was re-elected as the Nkeyema member of parliament.

== See also ==
- List of members of the National Assembly of Zambia (2021–2026)
