= Sioma (constituency) =

Constituency of the National Assembly of Zambia

Sioma is a constituency of the National Assembly of Zambia. It was created in 2016, when Sinjembela was split into two constituencies (Sioma and Shang'ombo). It covers Sioma District in Western Province, including the towns of Sioma and Sinjembela.

== List of MPs ==
Election year	MP	Party
Sioma
2016	Mbololwa Subulwa	Independent
2021	Kaliye Mandandi	United Party for National Development
2026	Kaliye Mandandi	United Party for National Development
