= Sikongo (constituency) =

Constituency of the National Assembly of Zambia

Sikongo is a constituency of the National Assembly of Zambia. It covers Sikongo District in Western Province.

== List of MPs ==
Election year	MP	Party
Sikongo
1973	Maboshe Silumesii	United National Independence Party
1978	Mbambo Sianga	United National Independence Party
1983	Mbambo Sianga	United National Independence Party
1988	Mbambo Sianga	United National Independence Party
1991	Simon Zukas	Movement for Multi-Party Democracy
1996	Nalumino Liandu	Movement for Multi-Party Democracy
2000	Best Makumba	United Party for National Development
2001	Best Makumba	United Party for National Development
2006	Mundia Ndalamei	Movement for Multi-Party Democracy
2011	Mundia Ndalamei	Movement for Multi-Party Democracy
2016	Mundia Ndalamei	United Party for National Development
2021	Mayungo Simushi	United Party for National Development
2026	Mayungo Simushi	United Party for National Development
