= Mitete (constituency) =

Constituency of the National Assembly of Zambia

Mitete is a constituency of the National Assembly of Zambia. It covers Mitete District in Western Province.

== List of MPs ==
Election year	MP	Party
Lukulu West
1991	Simon Ngombo	Movement for Multi-Party Democracy
1996	Simasiku Namakando	Movement for Multi-Party Democracy
2001	Simasiku Namakando	United Party for National Development
2006	Eileen Imbwae	United Liberal Party
2011	Misheck Mutelo	Movement for Multi-Party Democracy
2013 (by-election)	Misheck Mutelo	United Party for National Development
Mitete
2016	Misheck Mutelo	United Party for National Development
2021	Misheck Mutelo	United Party for National Development
2026	Misheck Mutelo	United Party for National Development
