= Lusangazi Central =

National Assembly constituency in Zambia

Lusangazi Central is a constituency of the National Assembly of Zambia. It was created in 2026 by splitting Msanzala. It covers the north-eastern part of Lusangazi District.

== List of MPs ==
Election year	MP	Party
Lusangazi Central
2026	Douglas Lungu	United Party for National Development
