= Mwandi District =

Coordinates: 15°00′S 22°30′E

- District
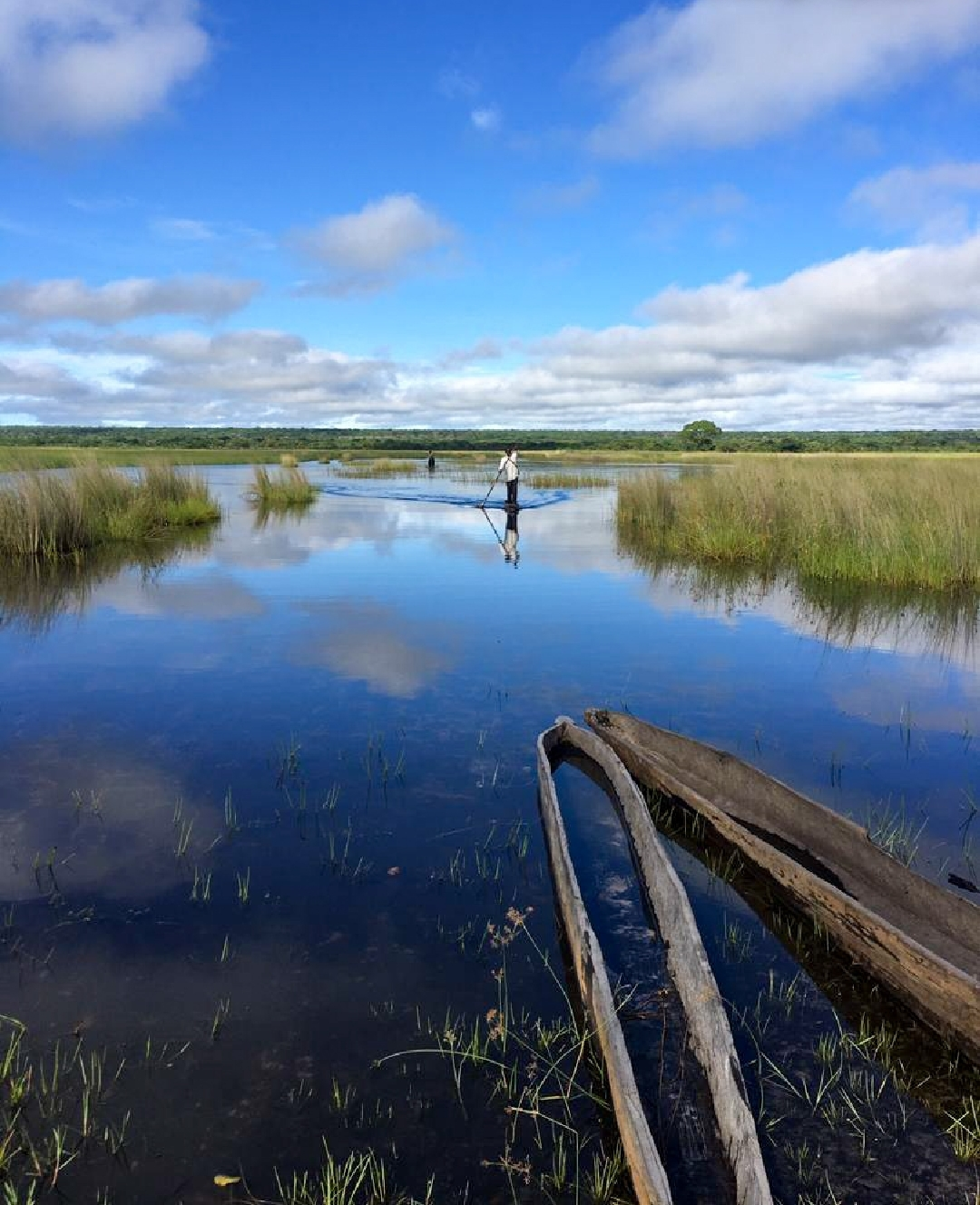
- Landscape in Mwandi District

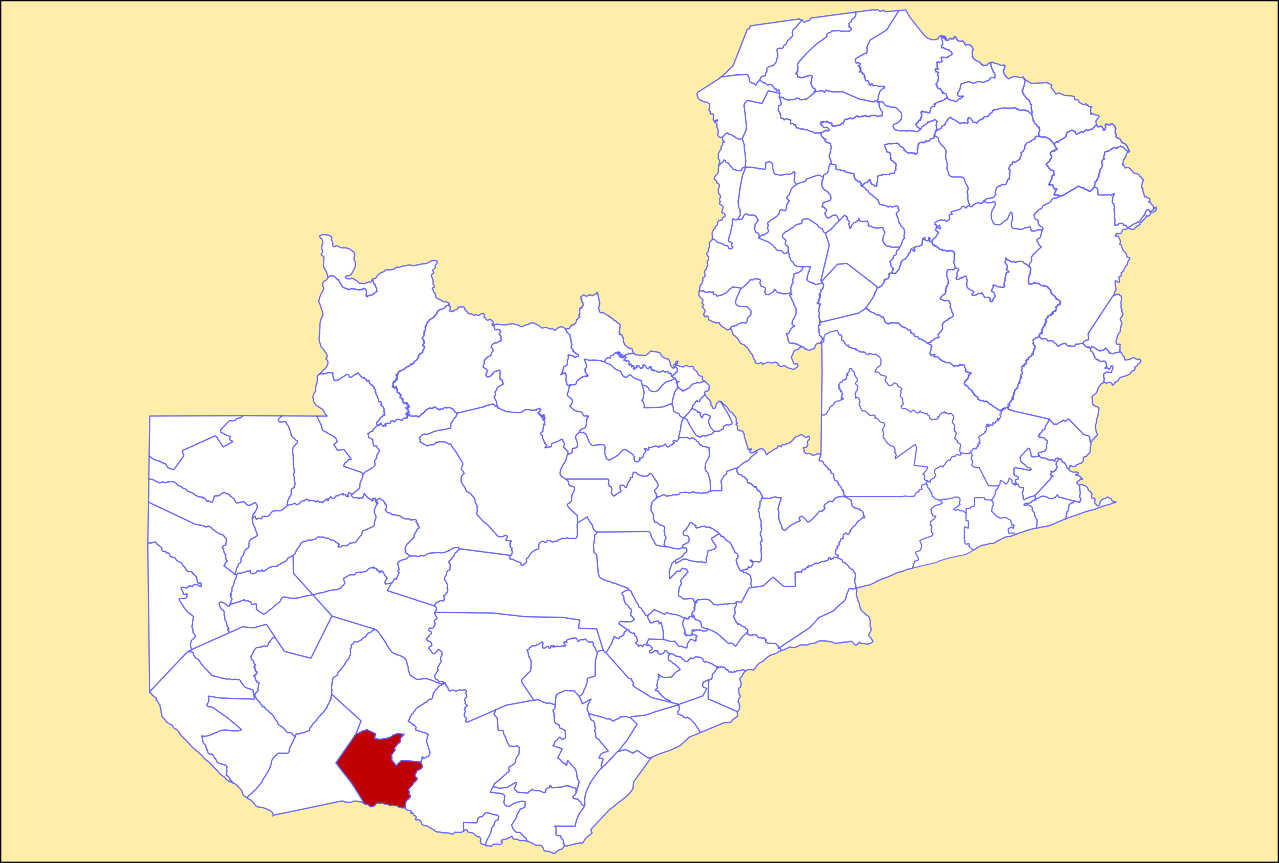
- District location in Zambia
- Country: Zambia
- Province: Western Province

Area
  - Total: 5,732.4 km^{2} (2,213.3 sq mi)

Population (2022)
  - Total: 40,418
  - Density: 7.0508/km^{2} (18.261/sq mi)
- Time zone: UTC+2 (CAT)

Mwandi District is a district of Zambia in the Western Province. The capital is at Mwandi. It was separated from Sesheke District in 2012. As of the 2022 Zambian census, it has a population of 40,418.
