= Manyinga District =

Coordinates: 12°58′S 24°19′E

- District
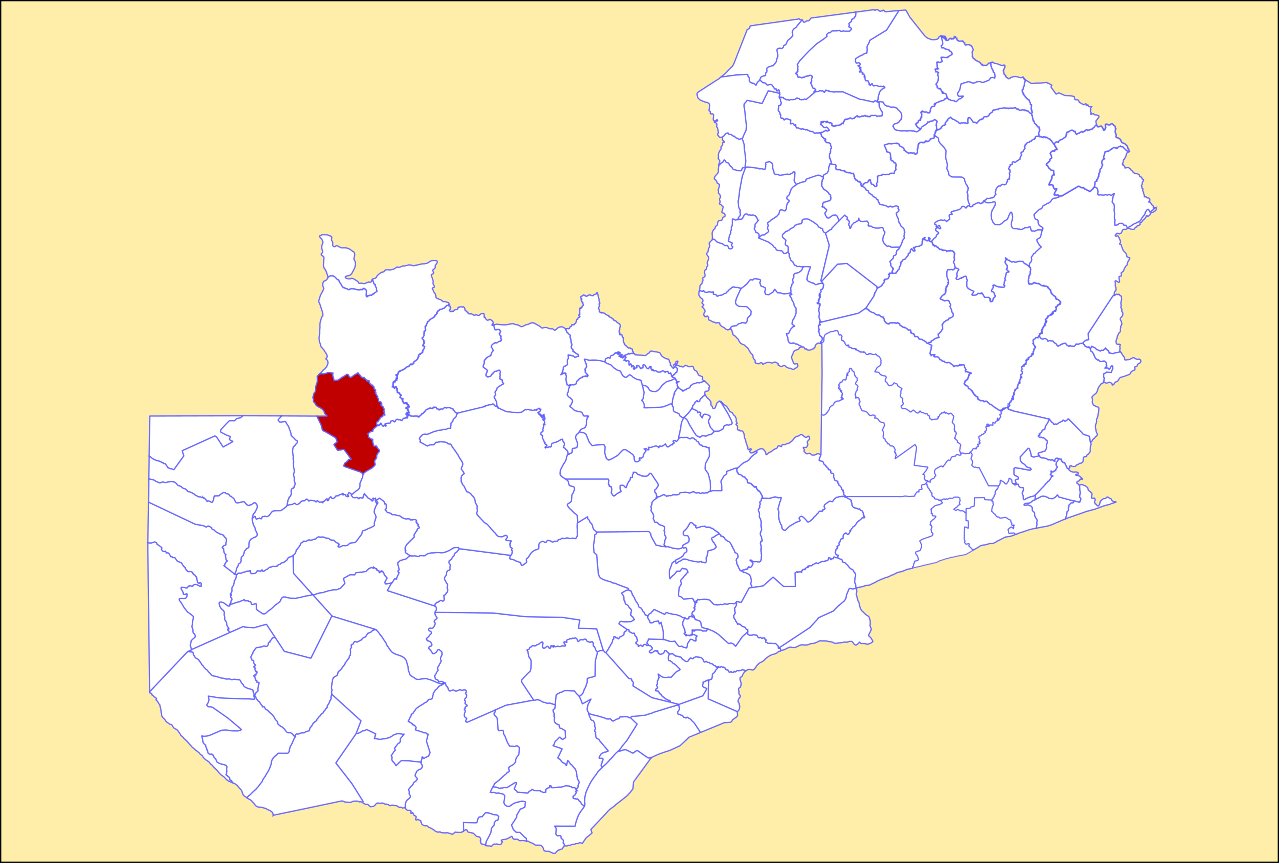
- District location in Zambia
- Country: Zambia
- Province: North-Western Province

Area
  - Total: 7,480.2 km^{2} (2,888.1 sq mi)

Population (2022)
  - Total: 75,030
  - Density: 10.03/km^{2} (25.98/sq mi)
- Time zone: UTC+2 (CAT)

Manyinga District is a district of North-Western Province, Zambia. It was separated from Kabompo District in 2012. As of the 2022 Zambian Census, the district had a population of 75,030 people.
