= Kasenengwa District =

- District
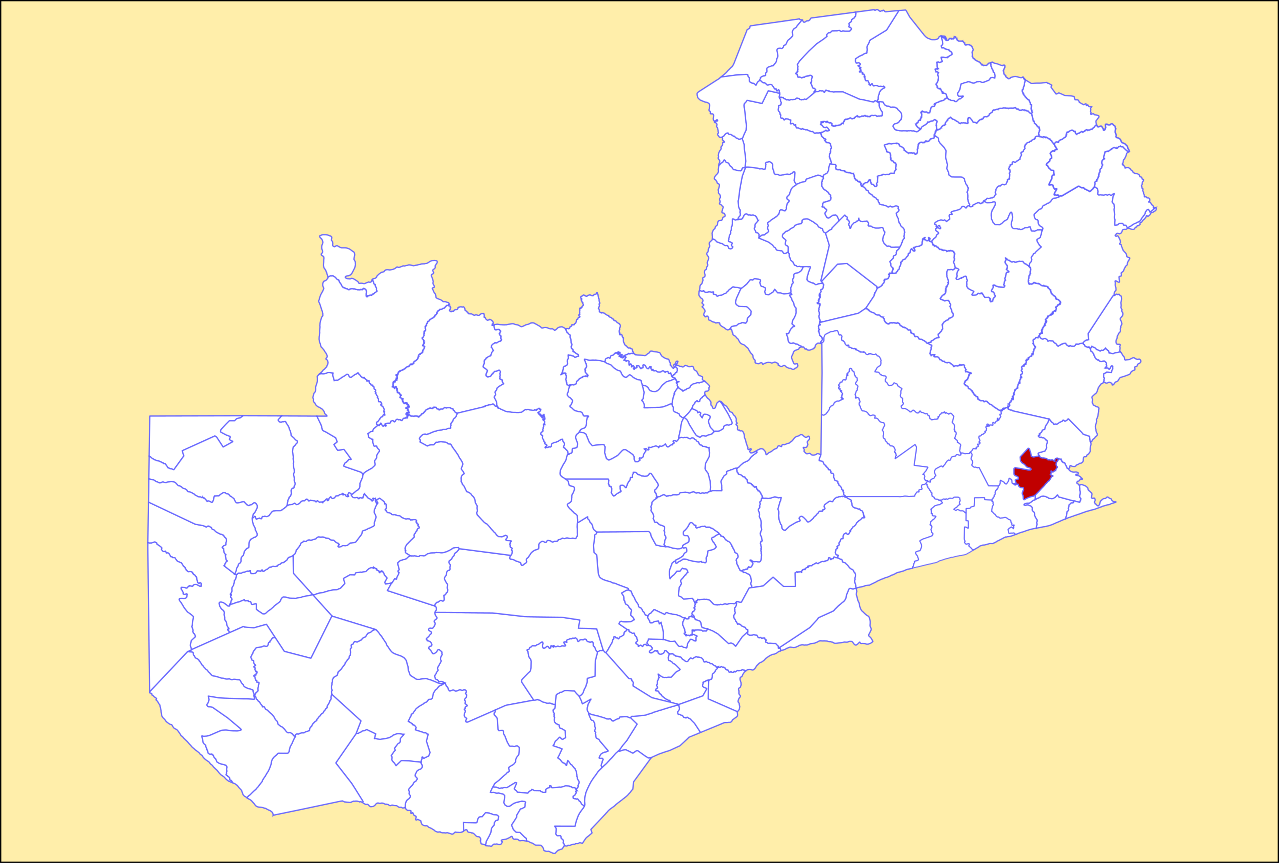
- District location in Zambia
- Country: Zambia
- Province: Eastern Province

Area
  - Total: 1,967.4 km^{2} (759.6 sq mi)

Population (2022)
  - Total: 155,565
  - Density: 79.071/km^{2} (204.79/sq mi)
- Time zone: UTC+2 (CAT)

Kasenengwa District is a district of Eastern Province, Zambia. It was made independent from Chipata District in 2018. As of the 2022 Zambian Census, the district had a population of 155,565 people.
