= Chipangali District =

- District
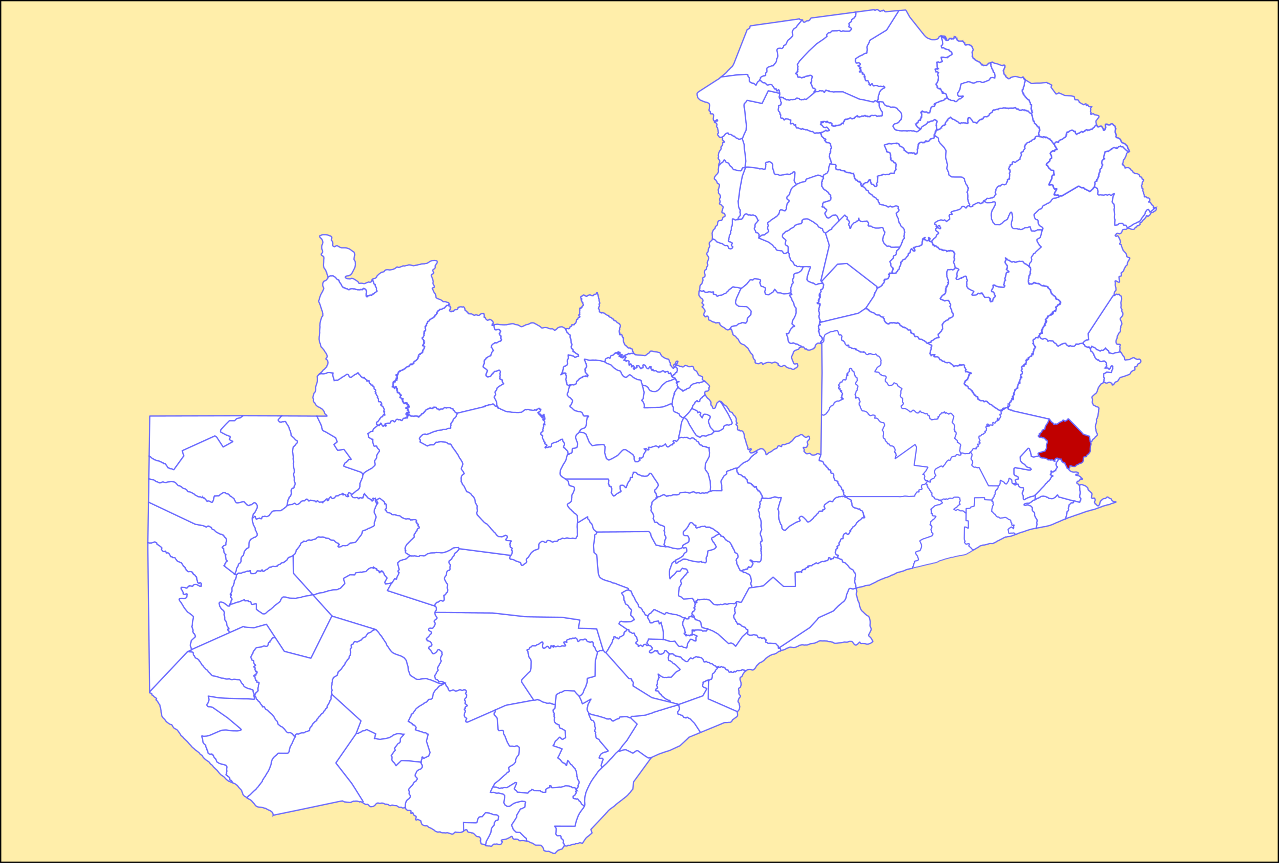
- District location in Zambia
- Country: Zambia
- Province: Eastern Province

Area
  - Total: 2,687.9 km^{2} (1,037.8 sq mi)

Population (2022)
  - Total: 169,357
  - Density: 63.007/km^{2} (163.19/sq mi)
- Time zone: UTC+2 (CAT)

Chipangali District is a district of Eastern Province, Zambia. It was made independent from Chipata District in 2018. As of the 2022 Zambian Census, the district had a population of 169,357 people.
