= Chadiza District =

Coordinates: 14°00′S 32°45′E

- District
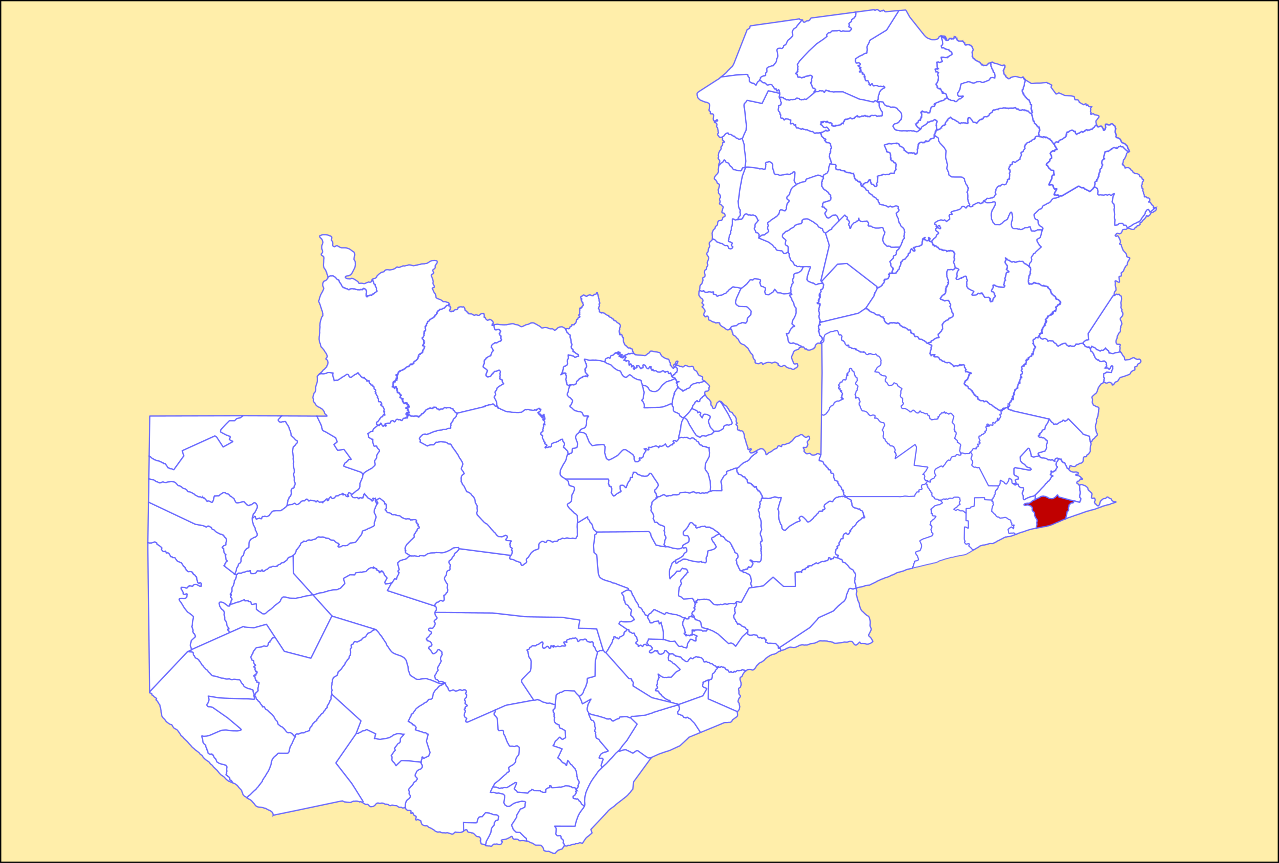
- District location in Zambia
- Country: Zambia
- Province: Eastern Province
- Capital: Chadiza

Area
  - Total: 1,593.6 km^{2} (615.3 sq mi)

Population (2022)
  - Total: 111,069
  - Density: 69.697/km^{2} (180.51/sq mi)
- Time zone: UTC+2 (CAT)

Chadiza District with the headquarters at Chadiza lies in the extreme south-east corner of Zambia, bordering Mozambique to its south. The eastern half of the district is characterised by wooded rocky hills rising to 1330 m while the western half has the same character as the land around Chadiza town. This part of the district has been almost completely deforested and suffers soil erosion. In 2012, most of the eastern part of the district was declared its own district, namely Vubwi District.

As of the 2022 Zambian Census, the district had a population of 111,069 people.
