= Vubwi (constituency) =

Constituency of the National Assembly of Zambia

Vubwi is a constituency of the National Assembly of Zambia. It covers Chilengo and Mkoko in Vubwi District of Eastern Province.

== List of MPs ==
Election year	MP	Party
1991	Lusian Mwale	United National Independence Party
1996	Alexander Miti	Movement for Multi-Party Democracy
2001	Phillip Phiri	United National Independence Party
2006	Eustarckio Kazonga	Movement for Multi-Party Democracy
2011	Eustarckio Kazonga	Movement for Multi-Party Democracy
2014 (by-election)	Margaret Miti	Patriotic Front
2016	Margaret Miti	Patriotic Front
2021	Ackleo Aaron Banda	Patriotic Front
2026	Margaret Miti	National Reconciliation Party for Unity and Prosperity
