= Chembe (constituency) =

Constituency of the National Assembly of Zambia

Chembe is a constituency of the National Assembly of Zambia. It covers Chembe and Kundamfuma in Chembe District of Luapula Province, and was created in 2016 when the former Chembe constituency was renamed Milenge.

== List of MPs ==
Election year	MP	Party
2016	Sebastian Kopulande	Patriotic Front
2021	Cliff Mpundu	Patriotic Front
2026	Kasongo Chomba	National Reconciliation Party for Unity and Prosperity
