= Kapoche (constituency) =

Constituency of the National Assembly of Zambia

Kapoche is a constituency of the National Assembly of Zambia. It was created in 2016, covering an area adjacent to the Mozambican border in Sinda District, Eastern Province.

== List of MPs ==
Election year	MP	Party
2016	Charles Banda	Patriotic Front
2021	Luckson Mwaiwanu Lungu	Patriotic Front
2026	Enock Kaimba	Resolute Party
