= Mkushi South =

National Assembly constituency in Zambia

Mkushi South is a constituency of the National Assembly of Zambia. It was created in 2026 by splitting Mkushi North. It covers the southern part of Mkushi District.

== List of MPs ==
Election year	MP	Party
2026	Sydney Chisanga	United Party for National Development
