= Nchanga (constituency) =

Constituency of the National Assembly of Zambia

Nchanga is a constituency of the National Assembly of Zambia. It covers the north-eastern areas of Chingola District of Copperbelt Province, including part of the Chingola town centre and the suburbs of Kabundi and Nchanga.

== List of MPs ==
| Election year | MP | Party |
Nchanga
| 1964 | Aaron Milner | United National Independence Party |
Chingola East
| 1968 | Fines Bulawayo | United National Independence Party |
Nchanga
| 1973 | Cosmas Masongo | United National Independence Party |
| 1978 | Cosmas Masongo | United National Independence Party |
| 1983 | Titus Mukupa | United National Independence Party |
| 1988 | Titus Mukupa | United National Independence Party |
| 1991 | Bonface Kawimbe | Movement for Multi-Party Democracy |
| 1996 | Ladislas Kamata | Movement for Multi-Party Democracy |
| 2001 | Richard Kazala-Laski | Movement for Multi-Party Democracy |
| 2006 | Charles Chimumbwa | Patriotic Front |
| 2007 (by-election) | Wylbur Simuusa | Patriotic Front |
| 2011 | Wylbur Simuusa | Patriotic Front |
| 2016 | Chilombo Chali | Patriotic Front |
| 2021 | Derricky Chilundika | United Party for National Development |
| 2026 | Rosemary Chipoya | National Reconciliation Party for Unity and Prosperity |
