= Lusangazi District =

- District
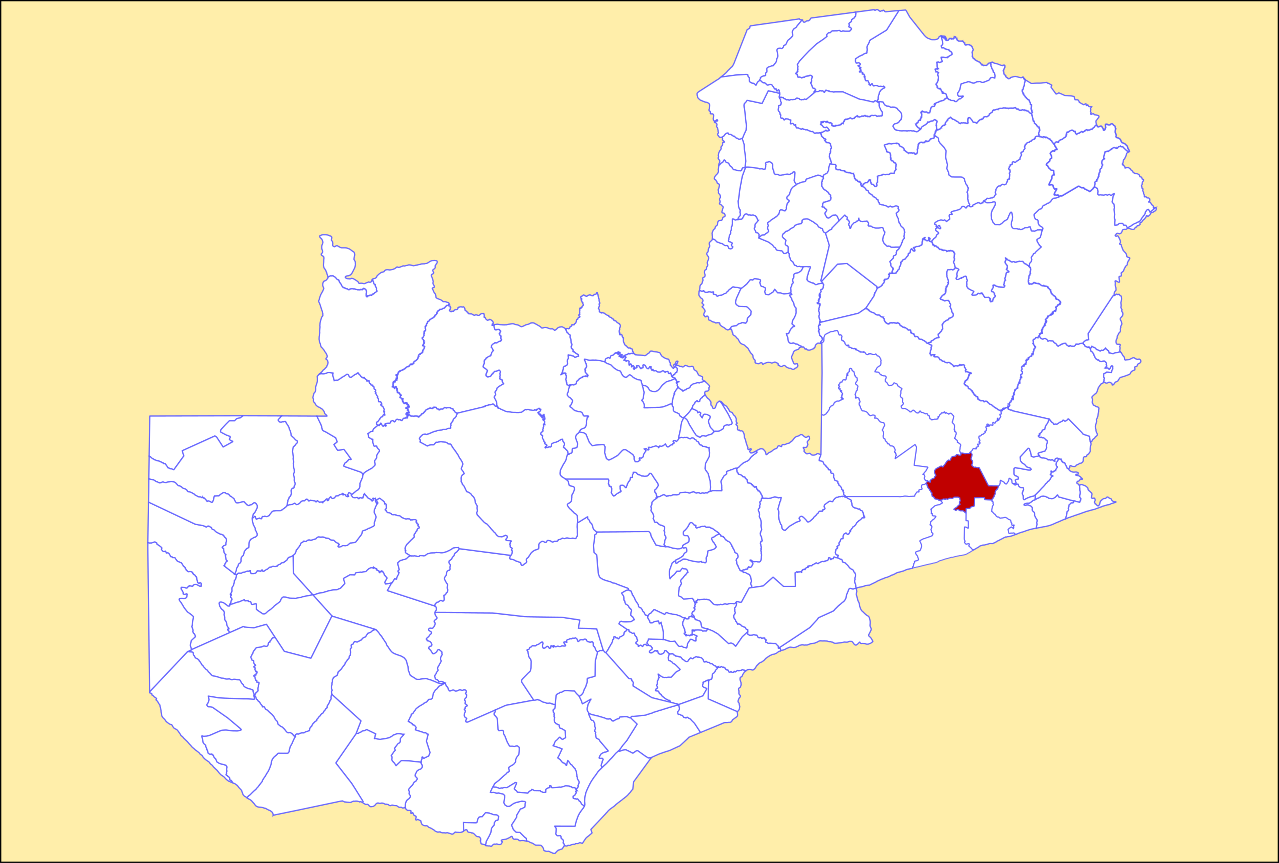
- District location in Zambia
- Country: Zambia
- Province: Eastern Province

Area
  - Total: 4,493.6 km^{2} (1,735.0 sq mi)

Population (2022)
  - Total: 110,523
  - Density: 24.596/km^{2} (63.702/sq mi)
- Time zone: UTC+2 (CAT)

Lusangazi District is a district of Eastern Province, Zambia. It was made independent from Petauke District in 2018. As of the 2022 Zambian Census, the district had a population of 110,523 people.
