= Sikongo District =

Coordinates: 15°00′S 22°30′E

- District
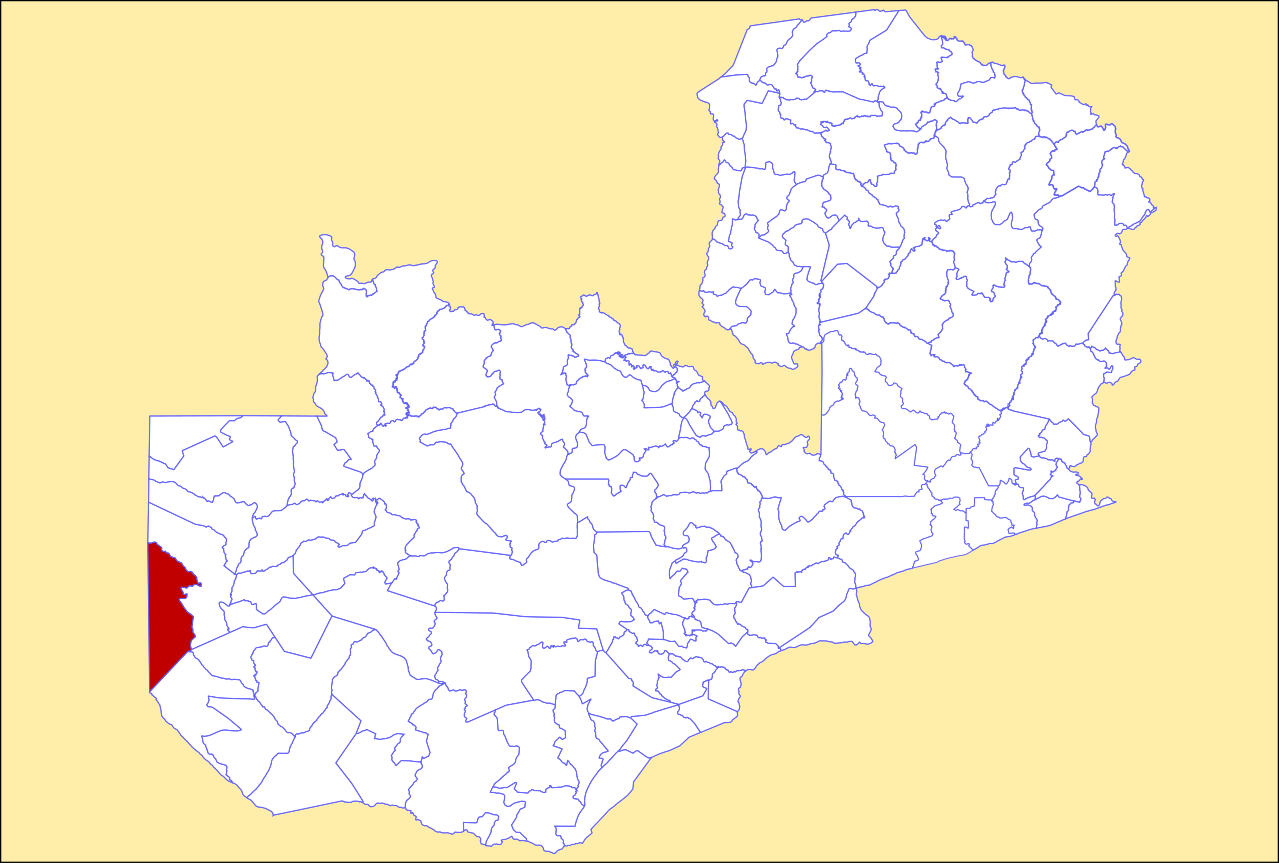
- District location in Zambia
- Country: Zambia
- Province: Western Province

Area
  - Total: 8,089.5 km^{2} (3,123.4 sq mi)

Population (2022)
  - Total: 59,670
  - Density: 7.376/km^{2} (19.10/sq mi)
- Time zone: UTC+2 (CAT)

Sikongo District is a district of Zambia, located in Western Province. It was separated from Kalabo District in 2012. As of the 2022 Zambian Census, the district had a population of 59,670 people.
