= Mitete District =

Coordinates: 15°00′S 22°30′E

- District
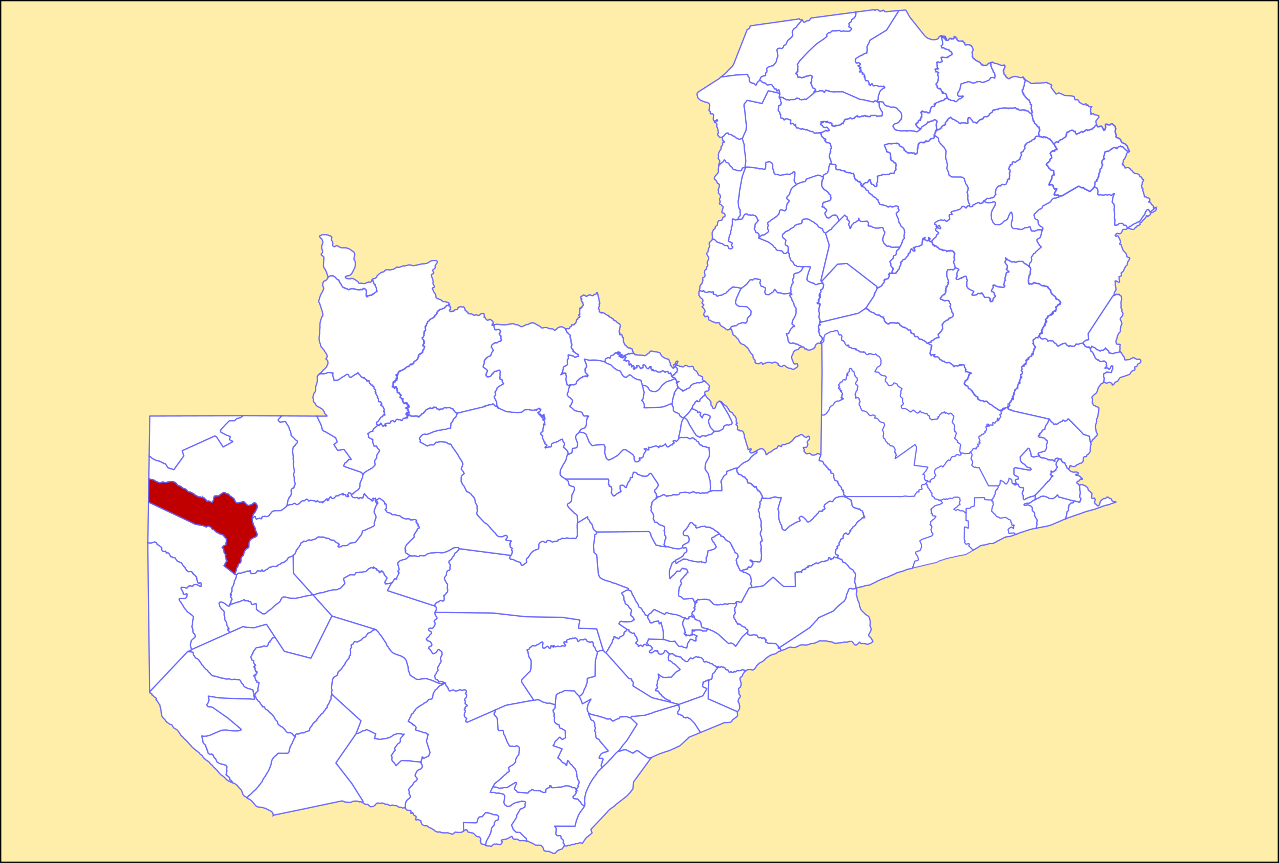
- District location in Zambia
- Country: Zambia
- Province: Western Province

Area
  - Total: 6,379.5 km^{2} (2,463.1 sq mi)

Population (2022)
  - Total: 39,641
  - Density: 6.2138/km^{2} (16.094/sq mi)
- Time zone: UTC+2 (CAT)

Mitete District is a district of Zambia, located in Western Province. It was separated from Lukulu District in 2012. As of the 2022 Zambian Census, the district had a population of 39,641 people.
