= Chingola District =

Coordinates: 12°30′S 27°45′E

- District
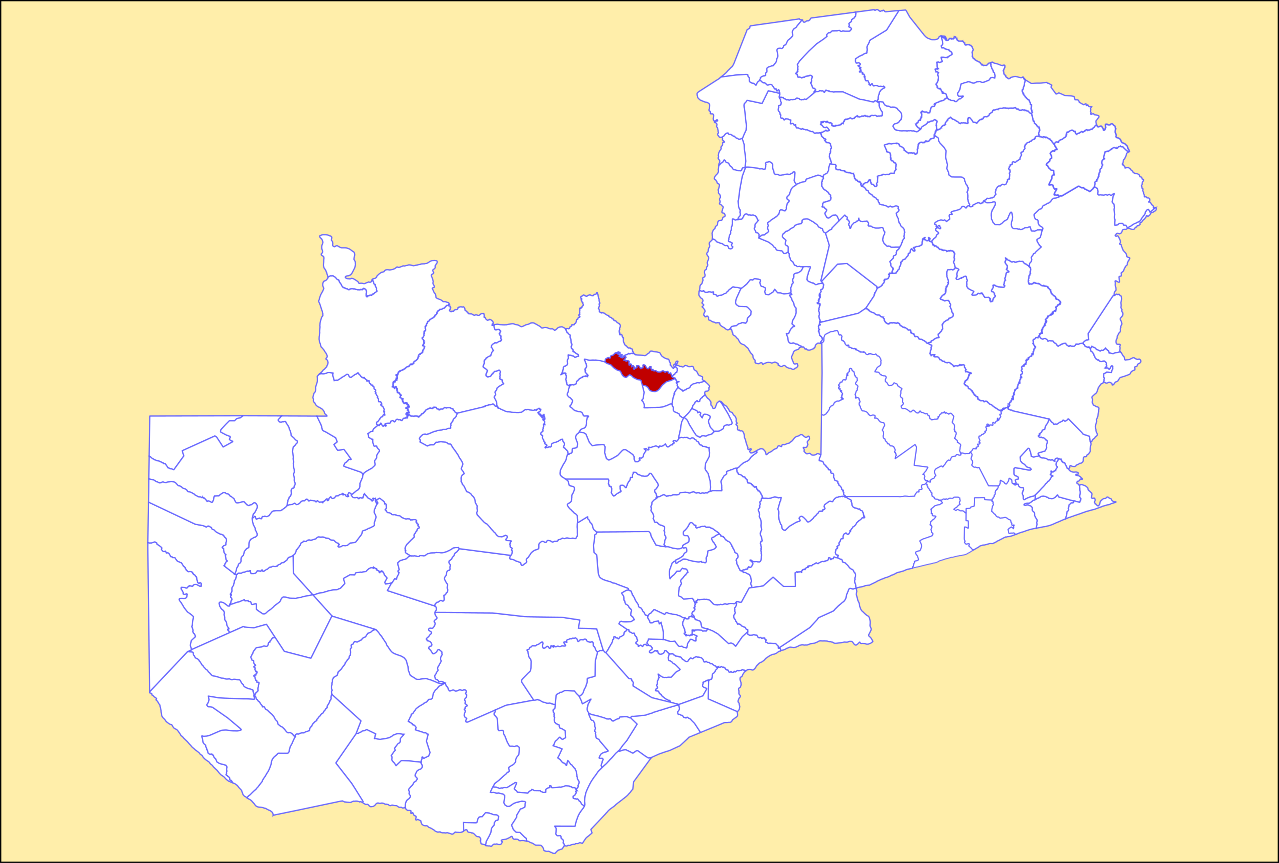
- District location in Zambia
- Country: Zambia
- Province: Copperbelt Province
- Capital: Chingola

Area
  - Total: 1,743.9 km^{2} (673.3 sq mi)

Population (2022)
  - Total: 299,936
  - Density: 171.99/km^{2} (445.46/sq mi)
- Time zone: UTC+2 (CAT)

Chingola District is a district of Zambia, located in Copperbelt Province. The capital lies at Chingola. As of the 2022 Zambian Census, the district had a population of 299,936 people. It is divided into two constituencies, namely Chingola constituency and Nchanga constituency.
