= Mambilima (constituency) =

Constituency of the National Assembly of Zambia

Mambilima is a constituency of the National Assembly of Zambia. It covers part of Mwense and the town of Kabila in Mwense District of Luapula Province.

== List of MPs ==
Election year	MP	Party
1991	Chisenga Bunda	Movement for Multi-Party Democracy
1996	Patrick Kalifungwa	Movement for Multi-Party Democracy
2001	Patrick Kalifungwa	Movement for Multi-Party Democracy
2006	John Chinyanta	Movement for Multi-Party Democracy
2011	Mighty Mumba	Patriotic Front
2016	Dennis Wanchinga	Patriotic Front
2021	Jean Ng'andwe Chisenga	Patriotic Front
2026	Jean Ng'andwe Chisenga	National Reconciliation Party for Unity and Prosperity
