= Pambashe (constituency) =

Constituency of the National Assembly of Zambia

Pambashe is a constituency of the National Assembly of Zambia. It covers a rural area in Kawambwa District of Luapula Province, including the towns of Chibote, Katota and Mushota.

== List of MPs ==
Election year	MP	Party
1991	Remmy Mushota	Movement for Multi-Party Democracy
1996	Alex Chama	Movement for Multi-Party Democracy
2001	Alex Chama	Movement for Multi-Party Democracy
2006	Bernard Chishya	Patriotic Front
2011	Ronald Chitotela	Patriotic Front
2016	Ronald Chitotela	Patriotic Front
2021	Ronald Chitotela	Patriotic Front
2025 (by-election)	Justin Kapema	United Party for National Development
2026	Williams Mwenya	National Reconciliation Party for Unity and Prosperity
