= Mwense District =

Coordinates: 10°25′S 29°00′E

Mwense District Mwense
- District
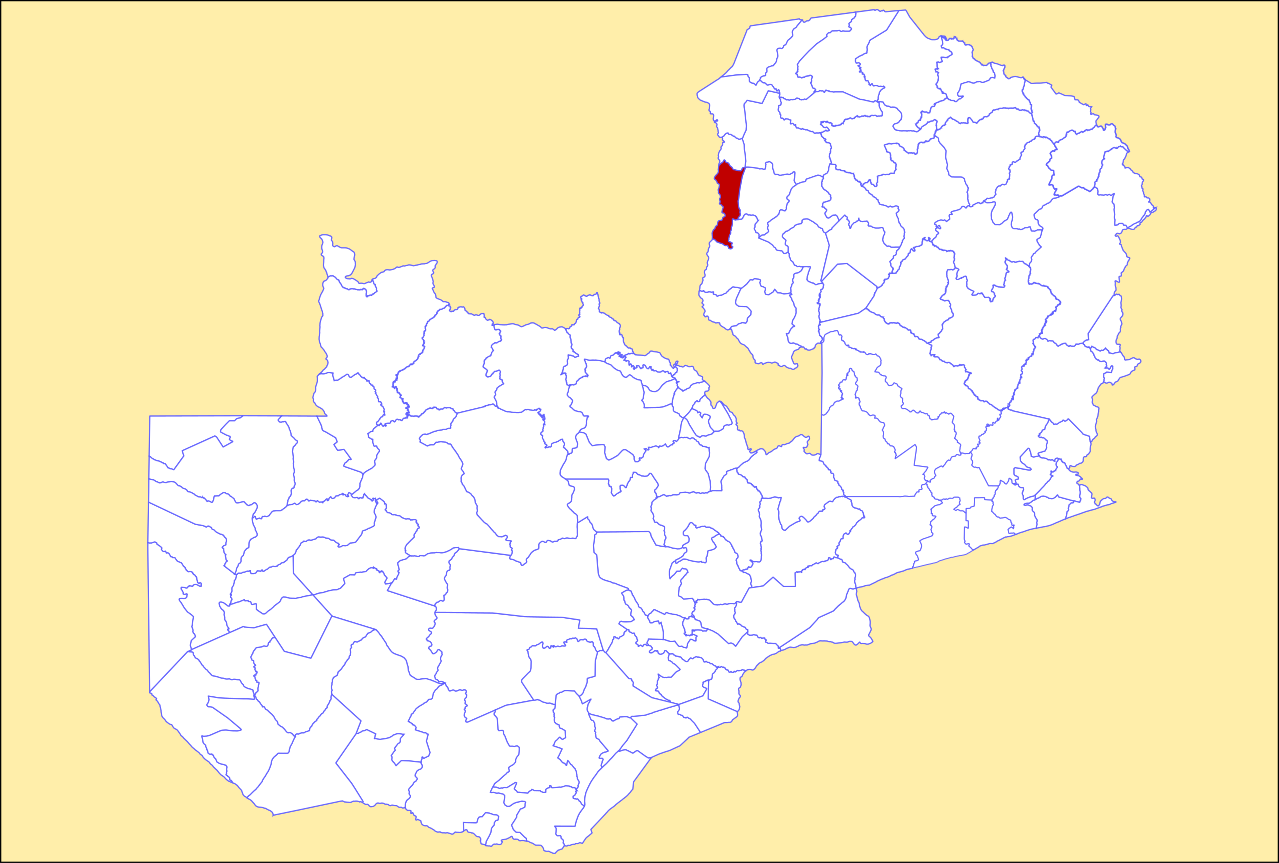
- District location in Zambia
- Country: Zambia
- Province: Luapula Province
- Capital: Mwense

Area
  - Total: 2,440.7 km^{2} (942.4 sq mi)

Population (2022)
  - Total: 122,605
  - Density: 50.234/km^{2} (130.10/sq mi)
- Time zone: UTC+2 (CAT)

Mwense District is a district of Zambia, located in Luapula Province. The capital lies at Mwense. As of the 2022 Zambian Census, the district had a population of 122,605 people. It consists of two constituencies, namely Mwense and Mambilima.
