= Lufubu (constituency) =

Constituency of the National Assembly of Zambia

Lufubu is a constituency of the National Assembly of Zambia. It covers a large rural area in the Ngabwe District of Central Province. It was created in 2016.

== List of MPs ==
| Election year | MP | Party |
|---|---|---|
| 2016 | Gift Chiyalika | Patriotic Front |
| 2021 | Wesley Kolala | United Party for National Development |
| 2026 | Lewis Chitaila | United Party for National Development |
