= Nkeyema District =

Coordinates: 14°51′S 25°09′E

Nkeyama District
- District
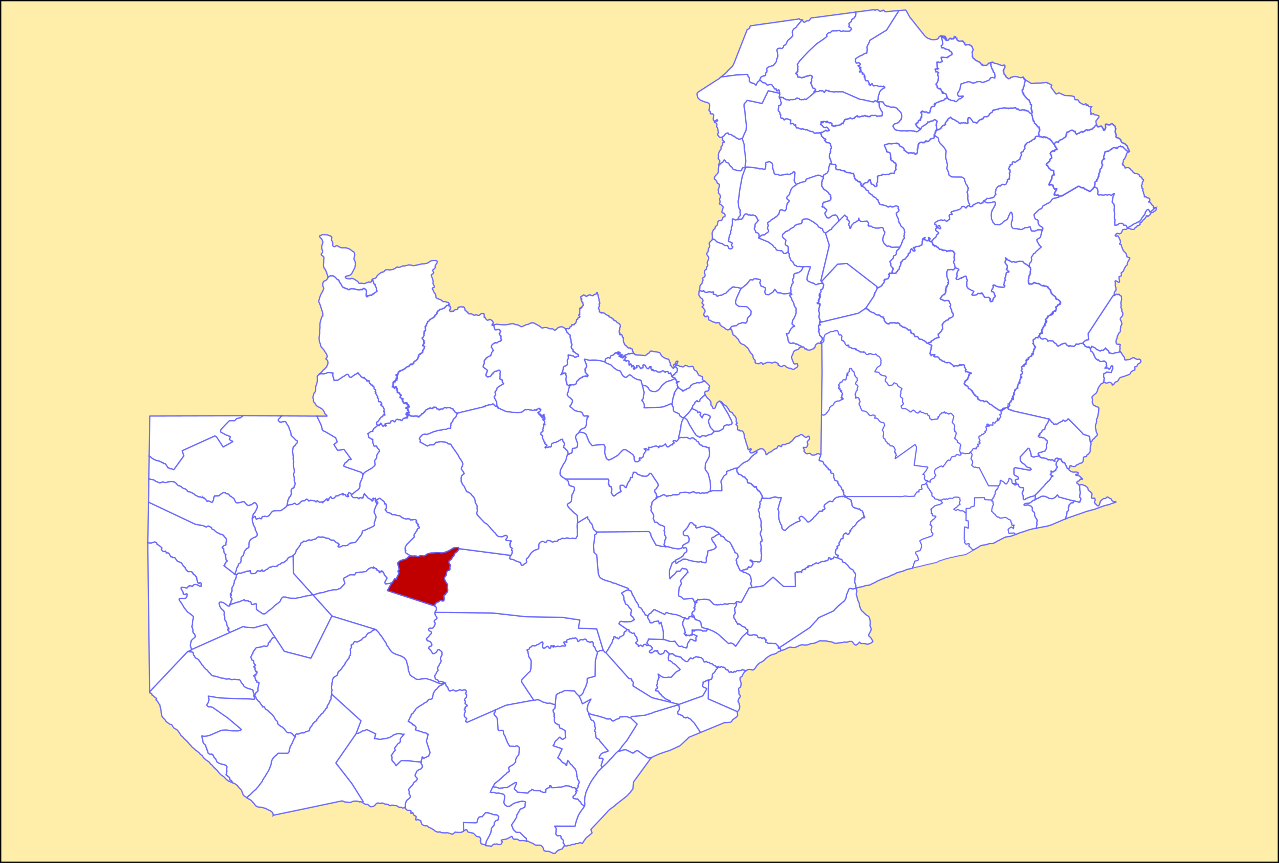
- District location in Zambia
- Country: Zambia
- Province: Western Province

Area
  - Total: 3,563.6 km^{2} (1,375.9 sq mi)

Population (2022)
  - Total: 106,074
  - Density: 29.766/km^{2} (77.094/sq mi)
- Time zone: UTC+2 (CAT)

Nkeyema District is a district of Western Province, Zambia. It was separated from Kaoma District in 2012. As of the 2022 Zambian Census, the district had a population of 106,074 people.
