= Chimbamilonga =

Constituency of the National Assembly of Zambia

Chimbamilonga is a constituency of the National Assembly of Zambia. It covers the towns of Kampinda, Mununu, Mutita, Ndole, Mushi, Nsumbu and Nsama in Nsama District of Northern Province.

== List of MPs ==
Election year	MP	Party
1991	Samuel Mukupa	Movement for Multi-Party Democracy
1996	Samuel Mukupa	Movement for Multi-Party Democracy
2001	Bishop Sakalani	Movement for Multi-Party Democracy
2006	Brian Sikazwe	Movement for Multi-Party Democracy
2011	Hastings Chansa	Patriotic Front
2016	Hastings Chansa	Patriotic Front
2021	Elias Makasa Musonda	Patriotic Front
2026	Titus Chipili	National Reconciliation Party for Unity and Prosperity
