= Sesheke District =

Coordinates: 16°45′S 24°20′E

- District
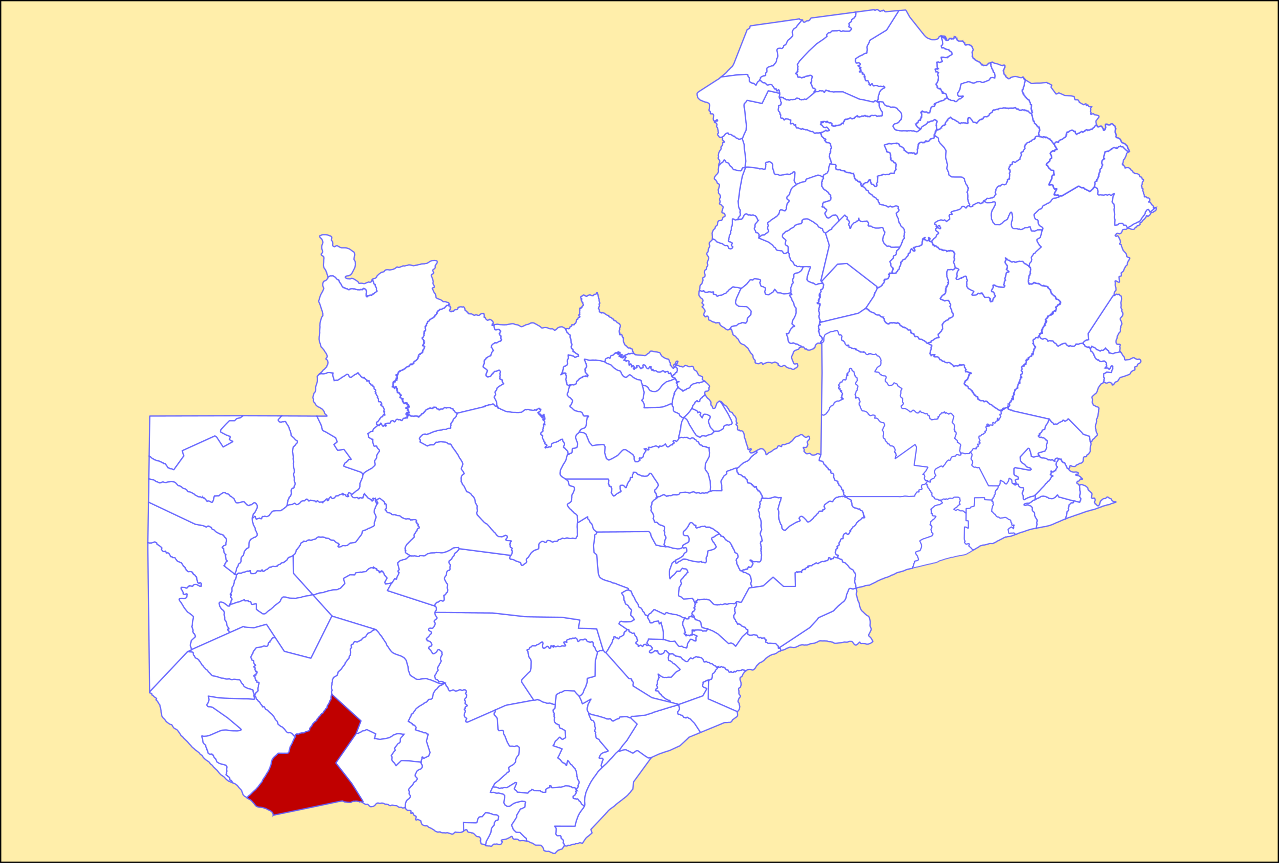
- District location in Zambia
- Country: Zambia
- Province: Western Province
- Capital: Sesheke

Area
  - Total: 11,658.9 km^{2} (4,501.5 sq mi)

Population (2022)
  - Total: 72,655
  - Density: 6.2317/km^{2} (16.140/sq mi)
- Time zone: UTC+2 (CAT)

Sesheke District is one of the sixteen (16) districts in Western Province of Zambia. The capital lies at Sesheke. As of the 2022 Zambian Census, the district had a population of 72,655 people. It contains part of Sioma Ngwezi National Park and contains part of the Zambezi River, which forms part of Zambia's border with Namibia.
