= Milenge (constituency) =

Constituency of the National Assembly of Zambia

Milenge is a constituency of the National Assembly of Zambia. It covers Milenge District in Luapula Province. Until 2016 it was named Chembe.

== List of MPs ==
Election year	MP	Party
Chembe
1973	Sylvester Chisembele	United National Independence Party
1978	Sylvester Chisembele	United National Independence Party
1983	Ernest Chiwama	United National Independence Party
1988	Dickson Mpundu	United National Independence Party
1991	Mumba Sokontwe	Movement for Multi-Party Democracy
1996	Mumba Sokontwe	Movement for Multi-Party Democracy
2001	Mumba Sokontwe	Movement for Multi-Party Democracy
2006	Mwansa Mbulakulima	Movement for Multi-Party Democracy
2011	Mwansa Mbulakulima	Movement for Multi-Party Democracy
Milenge
2016	Mwansa Mbulakulima	Patriotic Front
2021	Gystave Chonde	Independent
2026	Gystave Chonde	National Reconciliation Party for Unity and Prosperity
