= Eastern Province, Zambia =

Province of Zambia

Coordinates: 13°00′S 32°15′E

Eastern
- Province
- Map of Eastern Province

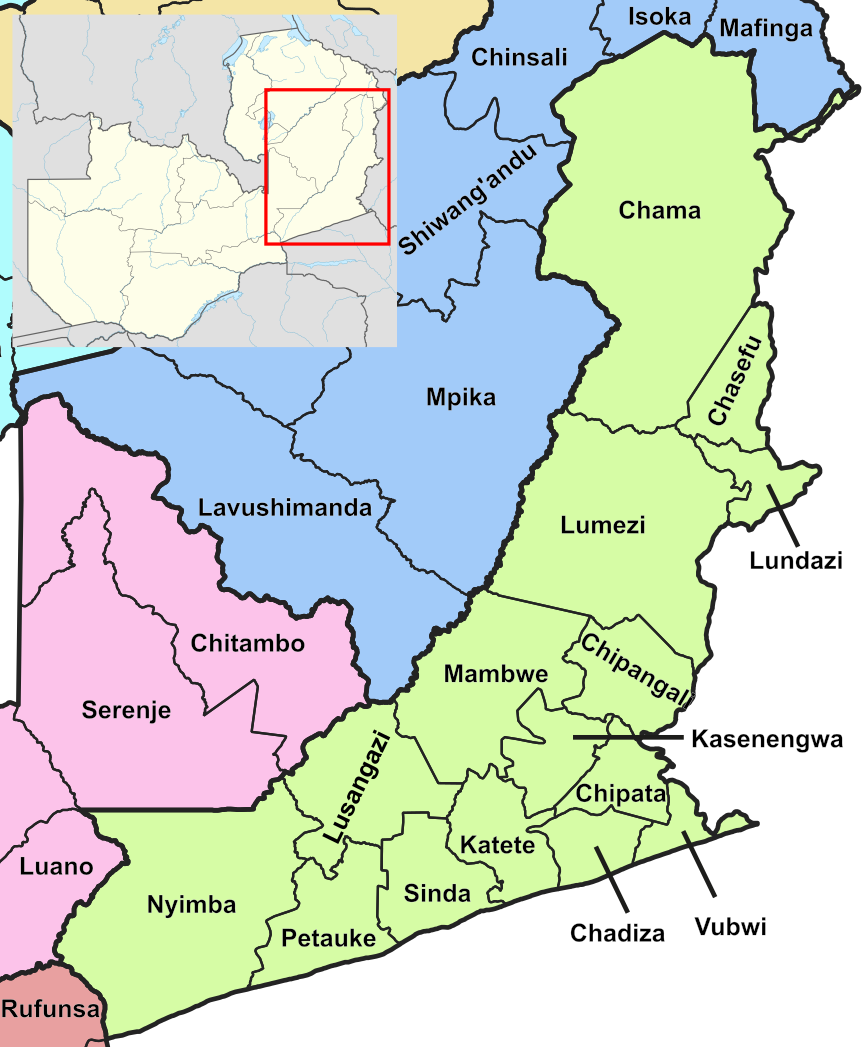
- Eastern Province showing its districts (in green).
- Country: Zambia
- Capital: Chipata

Government
  - Type: Provincial Administration
  - Provincial Minister: Peter Phiri

Area
  - Total: 98,877 km^{2} (38,177 sq mi)
- Elevation: 818 m (2,684 ft)

Population (2022)
  - Total: 2,454,588
  - Density: 24.825/km^{2} (64.296/sq mi)

Ethnic groups
  - Chewa: 39.7%
  - Nsenga: 20.3%
  - Tumbuka: 15.6%
  - Ngoni: 15.3%
  - Kunda: 3.3%

Languages
  - Chewa: 34.6%
  - Nsenga: 21.4%
  - Tumbuka: 16.5%
- Time zone: UTC-
- HDI (2018): 0.533 low · 9th
- Website: www.eas.gov.zm

Eastern Province is one of Zambia's ten provinces. The province lies between the Luangwa River and borders with Malawi to the east and Mozambique to the south, from Isoka in the northeast to the north of Luangwa in the south. The provincial capital is Chipata. The Eastern province has an area of about 51,476 km^{2} (19,875 sq mi), locally shares border with three other provinces of the country and is divided into fifteen districts. As per the 2010 Zambian census, the Eastern Province had a population of 1,592,661, accounting to 12.16% of the total Zambian population. The sex ratio was 1,030 females for every 1,000 males. The Chewa, Tumbuka and Nsenga people are the largest communities in the region. Chichewa and Chitumbuka are the most widely spoken languages. On the tourism front, the province has four national parks. The province has several significant traditional ceremonies such as Zengani, Vimkakanimba, Nc'wala and Kulamba. Agriculture is the major occupation in the province which accounts for 20.41 per cent of the total area cultivated in Zambia. The province accounted for 19.61 per cent of the total agricultural production in the country with sunflower being the major crop. Chipata Airport and Mfuwe Airport are the two airports in the province.

== History ==
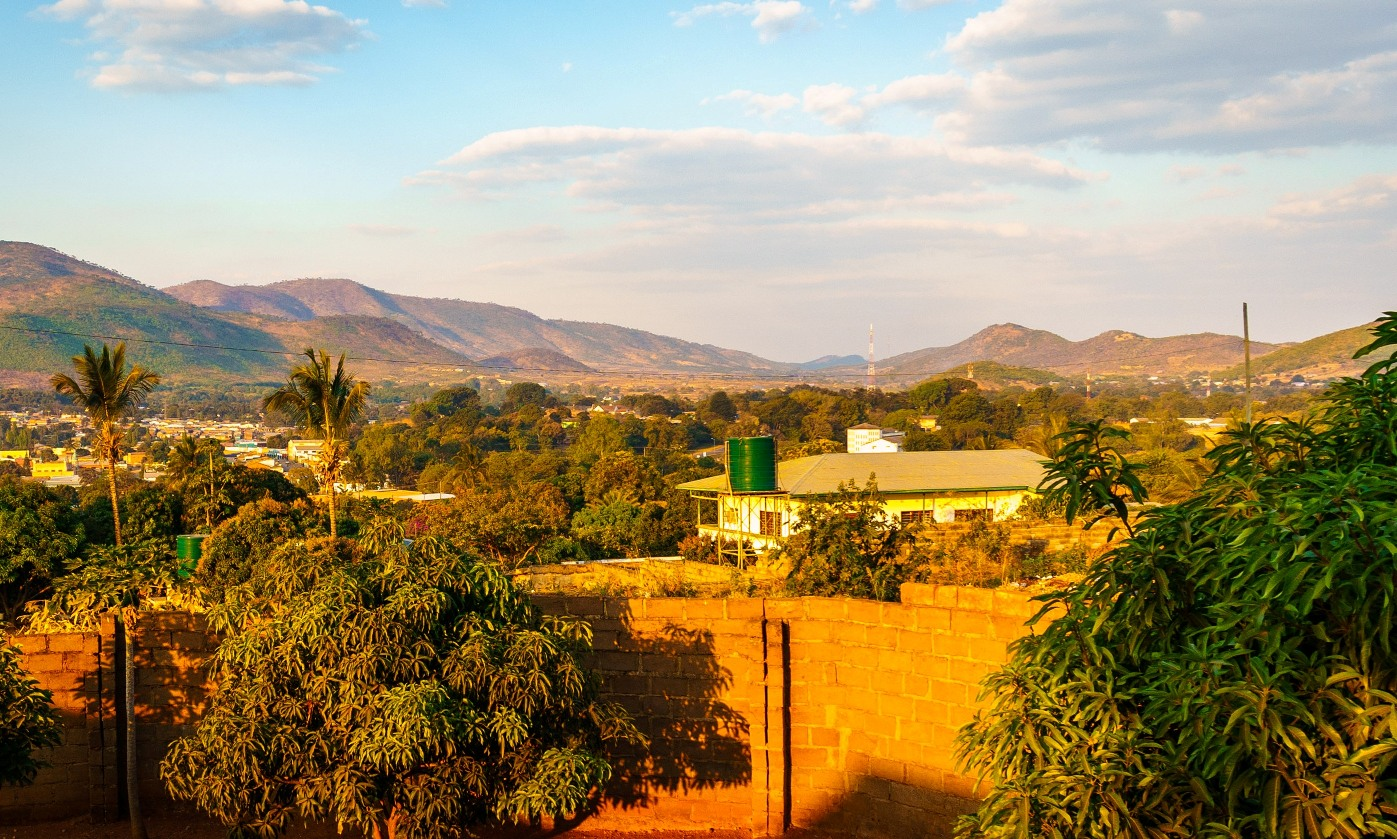
View of Chipata, the largest city in the province

The history of the province is centered around many Bantu groups who originated from Luba in the modern-day Democratic Republic of the Congo, the then Zaire. The chieftains of the empires exercised control over the territory in modern times. After the independence of Zambia, during the 1960s, some of the districts in the province had unprecedented growth in infrastructure and agriculture. However, the growth of the province was terminated along with that of the country due falling copper prices.

As of 2020, the Chewa, Tumbuka and Nsenga were the largest communities in the region. The province was claimed as a part of Malawi in 1968 by the then Malawian President, Dr. Hastings Kamazu Banda. The then Zambian president,Kenneth Kaunda, openly asked Malawi to engage war with Zambia to claim the province and also affirmed that Zambia would not have trade relations with Malawi until the claim on territory was withdrawn. The expansionist ambition of Malawi was discontinued and the Eastern Province remained with Zambia.

== Geography ==
The south-east corner of the province borders Malawi to its east and Mozambique to its south. Luangwa Valley rifting the highlands dividing Zambia and Malawi, is located in the region. A small portion of Nyika Plateau above Lake Nyasa is located in the northern portion of the province. Chipata is the most developed city in the province and the fifth most developed in the nation, followed by Lundazi and Petauke. The province is bordered by Muchinga Province to the north-west and Central Province and Lusaka Province to the south-west. There are isolated hills on the eastern border, some of which raise to a height of 6,000 ft (1,800 m) to 7,000 ft (2,100 m). The province, like seven other provinces except for Luapala and Northern provinces, lies in the watershed region between Congo and Zambezi river systems.

Climate data for Eastern (Zambia)
Month	Jan	Feb	Mar	Apr	May	Jun	Jul	Aug	Sep	Oct	Nov	Dec	Year
Record high °C (°F)	27.8 (82.0)	28 (82)	28.3 (82.9)	28.3 (82.9)	27.6 (81.7)	26.1 (79.0)	26.1 (79.0)	27.4 (81.3)	30.7 (87.3)	31.4 (88.5)	30.9 (87.6)	28.8 (83.8)	31.4 (88.5)
Mean daily minimum °C (°F)	18.2 (64.8)	17.9 (64.2)	17.4 (63.3)	16 (61)	13.6 (56.5)	11 (52)	10.6 (51.1)	12.7 (54.9)	17 (63)	18.7 (65.7)	19.1 (66.4)	18.7 (65.7)	10.6 (51.1)
Average precipitation mm (inches)	262 (10.3)	202 (8.0)	132 (5.2)	26 (1.0)	5 (0.2)	1 (0.0)	1 (0.0)	1 (0.0)	2 (0.1)	12 (0.5)	72 (2.8)	219 (8.6)	935 (36.8)
Source 1:
Source 2:

== Demographics ==
Historical population
Year	Pop.	±%
1964	480,000	—
1969	510,000	+6.2%
1980	911,552	+78.7%
1990	953,506	+4.6%
2000	1,306,173	+37.0%
2010	1,592,661	+21.9%
2022	2,462,685	+54.6%
Sources: 1964–69: 1980–2000: 2010:

As per the 2010 Zambian census, Eastern Province had a population of 1,592,661 accounting to 12.16 per cent of the total Zambian population of 13,092,666. There were 784,680 males and 807,981 females, making the sex ratio to 1,030 for every 1,000 males, compared to the national average of 1,028. The literacy rate stood at 54.40 per cent against a national average of 70.2 per cent. The rural population constituted 87.42 per cent, while the urban population was 12.58 per cent. The total area of the province was 51,476 km^{2} and the population density was 30.90 per km^{2}. The population density during 2000 Zambian census stood at 17.8. The decadal population growth of the province was 2.60 per cent. The province recorded the highest rural population of 1,392,338 in 2010 among all provinces in the country. The lowest median age of 20.1 years was recorded in the province as of 2010. The median age in the province at the time of marriage was 20.1. The average household size was 5.2, with the families headed by females being 4.3 and 5.5 for families headed by men. The total eligible voters in the province constituted 60.30 per cent. The unemployment rate of the province was 8.80 per cent. The total fertility rate was 6.6, complete birth rate was 6.3, crude birth rate was 38.0, child women population at birth was 819, general fertility rate was 168, gross reproduction rate was 2.6 and net reproduction rate was 1.8. The total labour force constituted 58.70 per cent of the total population. Out of the labour force 67.4 per cent were men and 50.7 per cent were women. The annual growth rate of labour force was 1.8 per cent. Nyanja was the most spoken language with more than 70.00 per cent speaking it. The total population in the province with the condition Albinism stood at 3,225. The life expectancy at birth stood at 46 compared to the national average of 51.

== Culture and wildlife parks ==
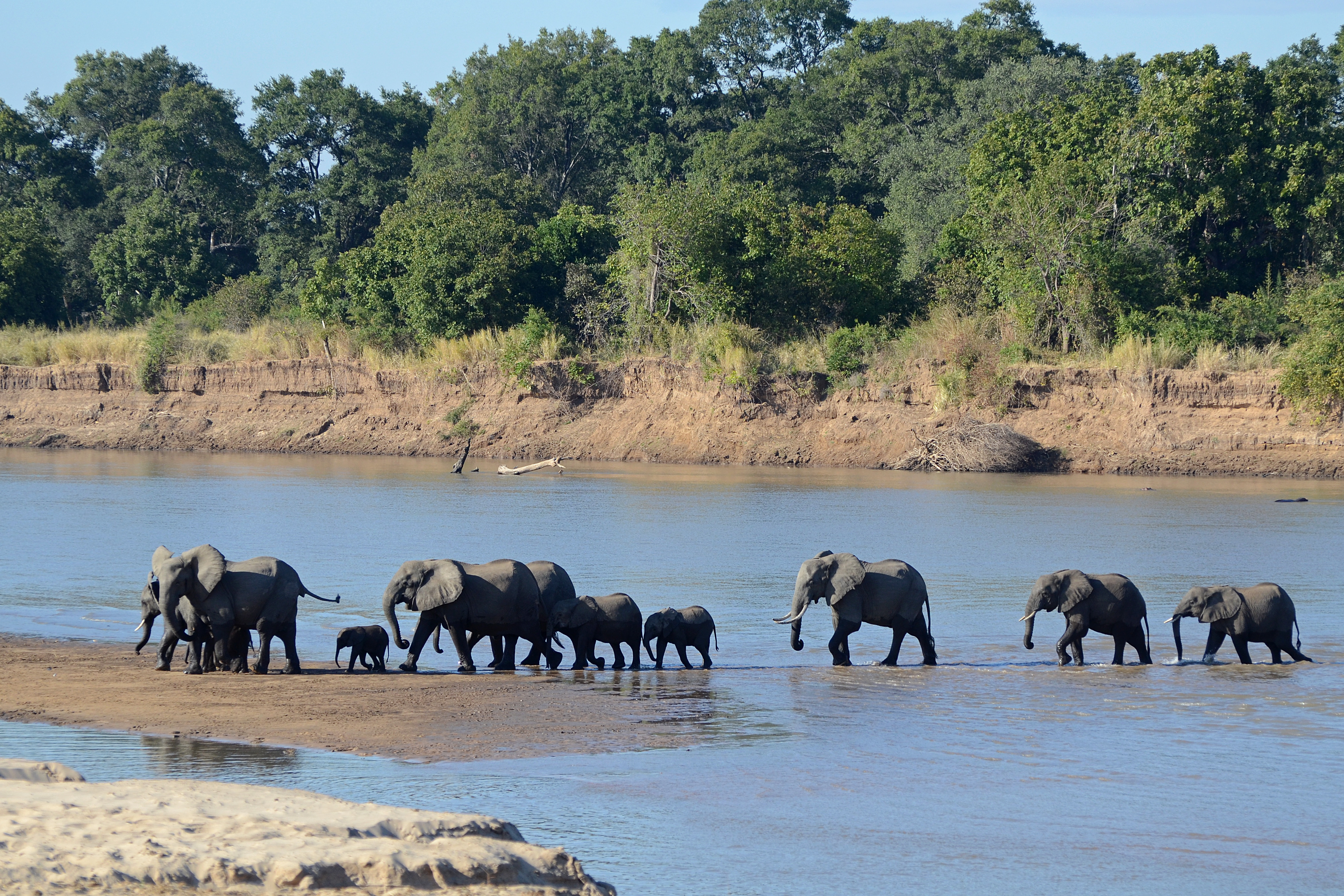
Elephants in South Luangwa National Park

The Luangwa Valley in Eastern Province has one of the best managed wild life areas in Zambia. South Luangwa National Park (although most of it lies outside the province, its management and the only public road access is from the province), North Luangwa National Park in Northern Province, Luambe National Park and Lukusuzi National Park are the major national parks in Eastern province. Game management areas cover most of the Luangwa Valley outside the national parks, and many animals migrate through the Province between the valley and game reserves in the highlands of neighbouring Malawi.

The Kulamba ceremony is the largest traditional ceremony in Zambia and is celebrated in Katete District by the Chewa tribe during August, the Nc'wala festival is celebrated in Chipata District by the Ngoni tribe during February, Kulonga festival celebrated in Lundazi District by Tumbuka tribe during August, Malaila festival celebrated in Mambwe District by Kunda tribe during August, Zengani festival celebrated in Lundazi District by Tumbuka tribe during October, Tuwimba festival celebrated in Petauke District by Nsenga tribe during October are the major festivals in the province. The Kulamba ceremony originated during the 15th century. N'cwala is the annual gathering of the Ngoni tribe and is also dubbed as first fruits ceremony. It is held during the last week of February to the first week of March for three days. The members of the tribe and onlookers attend the event in thousands and arrive at Mutenguleni villages near the city of Chipata.

== Administration ==
Profession	% of working population
Agriculture, Forestry & Fishing (by Industry)	19.10
Community, Social and Personal	6.30
Construction	7.10
Electricity, Gas, and water	4.10
Financial & Insurance activities	2.40
Hotels and Restaurants	3.10
Manufacturing	4.30
Mining & Quarrying	0.50
Transportation and Storage	4.10
Wholesale & Retail Trade	5.70

Provincial administration in Zambia is set up purely for administrative purposes. The province is headed by a minister appointed by the President and there are ministries of the central government for each province. The administrative head of the province is the Permanent Secretary, appointed by the President. There are a Deputy Permanent Secretary, heads of government departments and civil servants at the provincial level. Eastern Province is divided into fifteen districts as follows: Chadiza District, Chama District, Chasefu District, Chipangali District, Chipata District, Kasenengwa District, Katete District, Lumezi District, Lundazi District, Lusangazi District, Mambwe District, Nyimba District, Petauke District, Sinda District and Vubwi District. All the district headquarters are the same as the district names. There are fourteen councils in the province, each headed by an elected representative, called councillor. Each councillor holds the office for three years.

The administrative staff of the council is selected based on Local Government Service Commission from within or outside the district. The office of the provincial government is located in each of the district headquarters and has provincial local government officers and auditors. Each council is responsible for raising and collecting local taxes, and the budgets of the council are audited and submitted every year after the annual budget. The elected members of the council do not draw salaries, but are paid allowances from the council. Eastern Province is a predominantly rural area and hence there are no city or municipal councils. The government stipulates 63 different functions for the councils with the majority of them being infrastructure management and local administration.

Councils are mandated to maintain each of their community centres, zoos, local parks, drainage system, playgrounds, cemeteries, caravan sites, libraries, museums and art galleries. They also work along with specific government departments for helping in agriculture, conservation of natural resources, postal service, establishing and maintaining hospitals, schools and colleges. The councils prepare schemes that encourage community participation. Chama District from the province was aligned to the newly created Muchinga Province in 2011 but re-aligned back to the province in 2021 when President Hakainde Hichilema took office.

== Economy, health and education ==
HIV infected & AIDS deaths
Year	HIV infected	AIDS deaths
1985	779	107
1990	11,864	384
1995	49,750	2,688
2000	76,213	6,721
2005	81,680	9,614
2010	80,193	9,338

As of 2004, the province had 861 basic schools, 41 high schools and the number of school children out of school in ages between 7 and 15 stood at 861. The unemployment rate was 6 per cent and the general unemployment rate for youth stood at 12 per cent as of 2008. The province had 36 doctors as of 2005. There were 447 Malaria incidence for every 1,000 people in the province as of 2005 and there were 9,338 AIDS death as of 2010. As of 2010, the province had the lowest literacy rate of 54.4 per cent among all provinces in the country.

The total area of crops planted during the year 2014 in the province was 387,273.09 hectares which constituted 20.41 per cent of the total area cultivated in Zambia. The net production stood at 799,026 metric tonnes, which formed 19.61 per cent of the total agricultural production in the country. Sunflower was the major crop in the province with 24,053 metric tonnes, constituting 70.20 per cent of the national output.

Chipata Airport and Mfuwe Airport are the two airports in the province.

== See also ==
- Bibliography of the history of Zambia
