= Western Province, Zambia =

Province of Zambia

Coordinates: 16°3′22″S 23°45′8″E

Western
- Province
- Seal

- Western Province, Zambia

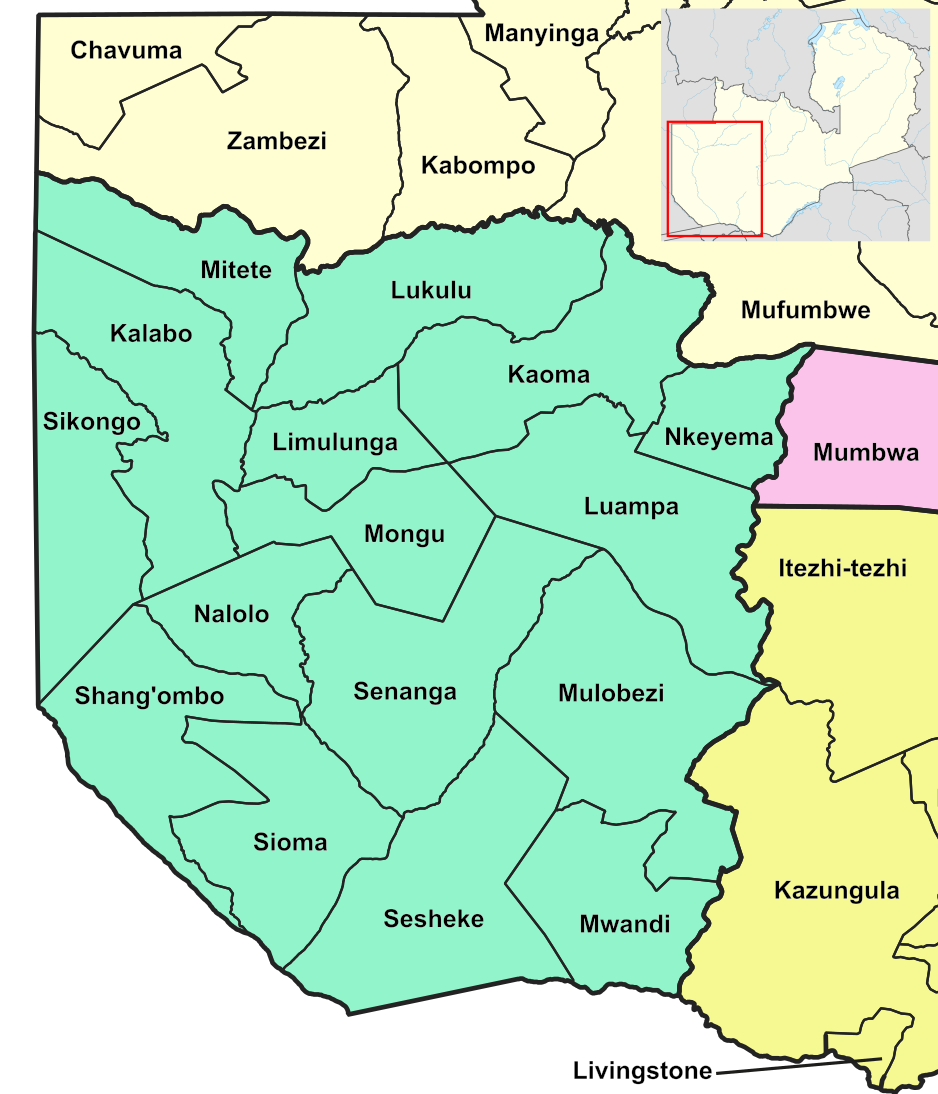
- Map of Western Province showing its districts
- Country: Zambia
- Capital: Mongu

Government
  - Type: Provincial Administration
  - Provincial Minister: Kapelwa Mbangweta (UPND)

Area
  - Total: 126,386 km^{2} (48,798 sq mi)

Population (2022)
  - Total: 1,363,520
  - Density: 10.7885/km^{2} (27.9422/sq mi)
- Time zone: UTC+2
- HDI (2018): 0.542 low · 7th
- Website: www.wes.gov.zm

Western Province is one of the 10 provinces in Zambia and encompasses most of the area formerly known as Barotseland. The capital is Mongu, and together with the neighbouring town of Limulunga, Mongu is treated as the capital of Barotseland.

== Geography ==
The geography of the province is dominated by the Barotse Floodplain of the Zambezi river, extending from the confluence of the Zambezi with the Lungwebungu and Kabompo Rivers at the northern border of the province, to a point below Senanga and above the Ngonye Falls in the south. This floodplain is inundated from December to June, and is fed by other rivers with their own floodplains, and serves as a vast reservoir storing the waters of the Zambezi. The seasonal flooding is very important to agriculture in the province, providing natural irrigation for the grasslands on which huge herds of cattle depend, and bringing water to the settlements along the edges of the plain. Away from the Zambezi and its tributaries, much of the landscape is a gently undulating series of fossil sand dunes from a previous extension of the Kalahari Desert, with numerous lagoons, pans and seasonal swamps in hollows between the dunes. Dry grassland plains, teak forest, miombo woodlands and patches of evergreen Cryptosepalum forest cover the land.

Climate data for Western (Zambia)
Month	Jan	Feb	Mar	Apr	May	Jun	Jul	Aug	Sep	Oct	Nov	Dec	Year
Record high °C (°F)	28.9 (84.0)	28.6 (83.5)	29.1 (84.4)	29.6 (85.3)	28.4 (83.1)	26.5 (79.7)	27 (81)	29.8 (85.6)	33.4 (92.1)	33.8 (92.8)	31.3 (88.3)	29.3 (84.7)	33.8 (92.8)
Mean daily maximum °C (°F)	22.8 (73.0)	22.8 (73.0)	22.8 (73.0)	22.3 (72.1)	19.9 (67.8)	17.3 (63.1)	17.8 (64.0)	20.7 (69.3)	24.6 (76.3)	25.4 (77.7)	23.7 (74.7)	22.9 (73.2)	25.4 (77.7)
Mean daily minimum °C (°F)	18.6 (65.5)	18.7 (65.7)	18.4 (65.1)	16.5 (61.7)	12.7 (54.9)	9.5 (49.1)	9.7 (49.5)	12.4 (54.3)	16.4 (61.5)	18.1 (64.6)	18.2 (64.8)	18.6 (65.5)	9.5 (49.1)
Average precipitation mm (inches)	255 (10.0)	205 (8.1)	150 (5.9)	34 (1.3)	1 (0.0)	0 (0)	0 (0)	0 (0)	3 (0.1)	23 (0.9)	124 (4.9)	208 (8.2)	1,003 (39.5)
Source 1:
Source 2:

== Transport ==
The main road into the province is the 590-kilometre Lusaka–Mongu Road from Central Province, through Kaoma to Mongu. There is a plan to link Zambia to its neighbouring Angola and as of 2016, the Barotse Floodplain Causeway, which extends the Lusaka-Mongu Road and connects Mongu with the other side of the Zambezi River (Kalabo) has been completed.

The M10 road is the other main road in the province, connecting Mongu with Livingstone via Senanga, Sioma (where it crosses the Zambezi) and Sesheke (where it bypasses the Katima Mulilo Border Post and crosses the Zambezi again as the Katima Mulilo Bridge).

The other roads in the province vary from a few good dry-season gravel roads such as Kaoma to Lukulu, to sandy or muddy tracks passable only by trucks and four-wheel drive vehicles.

== Demographics ==
Historical population
Year	Pop.	±%
1964	363,000	—
1969	410,000	+12.9%
1980	730,280	+78.1%
1990	751,316	+2.9%
2000	765,088	+1.8%
2010	902,974	+18.0%
Sources: 1964-69: 1980-2000: 2010:

As per the 2010 Zambian census, Western Province had a population of 902,974, (though the current population (2021) is estimated to be 1,076,683.) accounting to 6.72% of the total Zambian population of 13,092,666. There were 433,505 males and 469,469 females, making the sex ratio 1,083 females for every 1,000 males, compared to the national ratio of 1,028 females for every 1000 males. The literacy rate stood at 61.60% against a national average of 70.2%. The rural population constituted 86.73%, while the urban population was 13.27%. The total area of the province was 126,386 sq. km and the population density was 7.10 per sq. km. The population density during 2000 Zambian census stood at 7.10. The decadal population growth of the province was 1.70%. The median age in the province at the time of marriage was 20.5. The average household size was 5.0, with the families headed by females being 4.3 and 5.4 for families headed by men. The total eligible voters in the province was 68.90%. The unemployment rate of the province was 7.70%. The total fertility rate was 6.0, complete birth rate was 5.5, crude birth rate was 36.0, child women population at birth was 802, general fertility rate was 152, gross reproduction rate was 2.3 and net reproduction rate was 1.7. The total labour force constituted 63.80% of the total population. Out of the labour force, 67.1% were men and 61.1% women. The annual growth rate of labour force was 0.5%. Lozi was the most spoken language with 69.6% speaking it. Albinism is a condition where the victims do not have any pigment in their skin, hair or eyes. The total population in the province with the condition stood at 1,747. The life expectancy at birth stood at 53 compared to the national average of 51.

== Ethnicity ==
The Lozi are the major ethnic group in the province. The Lozi are traditionally cattle-keepers. They are a collection of 24 subgroups, with a well-established system of traditional rulers headed by the Litunga. The Litunga is assisted by subchiefs in Sesheke Senanga and Kalabo. The seasonal migrations of the Litunga and his court from the dry-season capital of Lealui, on the Zambezi flood-plain, to Limulunga, is an important cultural and now tourist event called the Kuomboka ceremony. There is an ethnic Nkoya minority centered on Kaoma (previously called Mankoya) district with their own chieftainship. The main traditional leaders of the Nkoya are Mwene (Chief) Mutondo and his equal counterpart, Mwene (Chief) Kahare all of Kaoma District and the surrounding areas. The Nkoya celebrate their annual traditional ceremony called the Kazanga or Kathanga between June and August in Kaoma District.

== Economy and education ==
HIV infected & AIDS deaths
Year	HIV infected	AIDS deaths
1985	1,067	107
1990	9,171	314
1995	35,208	1,684
2000	54,123	4,097
2005	58,224	5,971
2010	56,308	6,044

As of 2004, the province had 648 basic schools, 26 high schools and the number of school children out of school in ages between 7 and 15 stood at 36,984. The unemployment rate was 10 per cent and the general unemployment rate for youth stood at 18 per cent as of 2008. The province had 46 doctors as of 2005. There were 430 Malaria incidence for every 1,000 people in the province as of 2005 and there were 6,044 AIDS death as of 2010.

Cattle are the mainstay of the traditional economy, and are sold in the population centres further east when money is required for cash goods or school or medical expenses. Crops are grown on the fertile Barotse floodplains and along the margin of the flood plain, in particular maize, rice, millet and vegetables. The sandy soils of the province are good for Cashew nuts plantations which are not being exploited this day. The province has a huge forest a high potential for timber cutting and finishing investment. The locals exploit the timber at a small scale for curios and canoe making.

The total area of crops planted during the year 2014 in the province was 112,153.47 hectares which constituted 5.91% of the total area cultivated in Zambia. The net production stood at 103,127 metric tonnes, which formed 2.53% of the total agricultural production in the country. Rice was the major crop in the province with 20,862 metric tonnes, constituting 42.03% of the national output.

== Industry ==
Logging for Zambian Teak, which grows wild in the south of the province, was important, and resulted in the construction of the longest private railway in southern Africa from Livingstone to Mulobezi, but this industry has declined due to the very slow rates of re-growth and the reduced demand for railway sleepers. There is no mining within the province, although there have been extensive exploration campaigns for diamonds and petroleum.

== Tourism ==
The main tourist attractions are water sports and fishing on the Zambezi river, the annual Kuomboka ceremony and the annual Kazanga ceremony held in Kaoma District.

=== National Parks and wildlife areas ===
- The Zambezi River and its wide floodplain
- Liuwa Plain National Park
- Sioma Ngwezi National Park
- West Zambezi Game Management Area

== Administration ==
Profession	% of working population
Agriculture, Forestry & Fishing (by Industry)	9.50
Community, Social and Personnel	4.50
Construction	4.50
Electricity, Gas, and water	3.10
Financial & Insurance	2.40
Hotels and Restaurants	1.50
Manufacturing	14.10
Mining & Quarrying	0.70
Transportation and Storage	2.90
Wholesale & Retail Trade	3.80

Central Government Provincial administration is set up purely for administrative purposes. The province is headed by a Provincial Minister appointed by the President and there are ministries of central government for each province. The administrative head of the province is the Permanent Secretary, appointed by the President. There are Deputy Permanent Secretaries, District Commissioners, heads of government departments and civil servants at the provincial level. Western Province is divided into sixteen districts, namely, Kalabo District, Kaoma District, Limulunga District, Luampa District, Lukulu District, Mitete District, Mongu District, Mulobezi District, Mwandi District, Nalolo District, Nkeyema District, Senanga District, Sesheke District, Shangombo District, Sikongo District and Sioma District. All the district headquarters are the same as the district names. There are sixteen councils in the province for each district with political heads who are the Mayor in the case of Mongu District and Council Chairpersons for the other districts. the administrative heads of the councils are the Town Clerk in the case of Mongu District and Council Secretaries for the other districts. Each Mayor/ Council Chairperson holds office for a term of five years in accordance with the Zambian electoral cycle. The administrative staff of the council is selected based on Local Government Service Commission from within or outside the district. The office of the provincial government is located in each of the district headquarters and has provincial local government officers and auditors. Each council is responsible for raising and collecting local taxes and the budgets of the council are audited and submitted every year after the annual budget. The elected members of the council do not draw salaries, but are paid allowances from the council. Western is a predominantly rural province and hence there are no city or municipal councils. The government stipulates 63 different functions for the councils with the majority of them being infrastructure management and local administration. Councils are mandated to maintain each of their community centres, zoos, local parks, drainage system, playgrounds, cemeteries, caravan sites, libraries, museums and art galleries. They also work along with specific government departments for helping in agriculture, conservation of natural resources, postal service, establishing and maintaining hospitals, schools and colleges. The councils prepare schemes that encourage community participation.

== See also ==
- Bibliography of the history of Zambia
