= List of members of the National Assembly of Zambia (2026–2031) =

2026–present Parliament of Zambia
←	2021–2026 Parliament	2031–2036 Parliament	→

Overview
- Legislative body: Parliament of Zambia
- Meeting place: National Assembly Building
- Term: 2026 – 2031
- Election: 2026 Zambian General Election

National Assembly
- Members: 280
- Leader of Government Business: Mutale Nalumango

President of Zambia Hakainde Hichilema

This list contains the members of the National Assembly of Zambia serving during the 14th Assembly. The Assembly was formed following the 2026 Zambian general election, the first general election held under the electoral system introduced by the Constitution of Zambia (Amendment) Act No. 13 of 2025.

The amendment increased the number of constituency-based seats from 156 to 226 through the creation of 70 new constituencies, which the Electoral Commission of Zambia announced on 16 April 2026. It also introduced 40 proportional-representation seats reserved for women, youths and persons with disabilities. These changes increased the number of elected members to 266.

The National Assembly also includes members nominated by the President and members who hold office by virtue of their positions, including the Vice-President, Speaker and Deputy Speakers. Cabinet Ministers and Provincial Ministers are appointed from among Members of Parliament and do not constitute separate categories of parliamentary membership.

== Leadership ==
Presiding Officers
Name	Office	Party
Nelly Mutti	Speaker	UPND
Malungo Chisangano	First Deputy Speaker	
Nshamba Muzungu	Second Deputy Speaker	Independent
Whips and parliamentary leaders
Name	Office	Party
	Government Chief Whip	
Ezra Tembo	Leader of the Opposition	NRPUP
	Deputy Chief Whip	

== Composition ==
Under Article 68 of the Constitution of Zambia, as amended by the Constitution of Zambia (Amendment) Act No. 13 of 2025, the National Assembly consists of constituency-based members, members elected through proportional representation, presidentially nominated members, and members who hold office by virtue of their positions.

The composition of the National Assembly for the 2026–2031 parliamentary term is as follows:

Category	Number of members	Description
Constituency-based members	226	Members elected from parliamentary constituencies.
Proportional representation members	40	Twenty women, fifteen youths and five persons with disabilities, allocated to political parties according to the prescribed proportional representation system.
Presidential nominees	Not more than 11	Members nominated by the President to enhance the representation of special interests, skills or gender.
Vice-President	1	Member of the National Assembly by virtue of holding the office of Vice-President.
Speaker	1	Presiding officer of the National Assembly
First Deputy Speaker	1	Deputy presiding officer.
Second Deputy Speaker	1	Deputy presiding officer (Note: The second deputy speaker is selected from the 226 elected members of parliament.)
Total	Up to 280	Includes elected, nominated and ex officio members.

== List of members of parliament ==
=== Members elected ===
Constituency	Members		Notes
Constituency	Name and picture	Political Party	Notes
Kariba	Gift Sialubalo	UPND	Re-elected; new constituency; Minister of Local Government and Rural Development
Mbala Central	Raphael Chilufya	NRPUP	
Lupososhi	Shadreck Mwansa	UPND	
Kasama Central	Elasmous Chomba	NRPUP	
Kasama North	Justin Mutale	NRPUP	New constituency
Lukashya	Daniel Bwalya	NRPUP	
Lubansenshi	George Kingsley Mwamba	NRPUP	
Nakonde	Simon Simwanza	UPND	
Kabwata	Danny Yenga	NRPUP	
Mweru	Lesley Mulwanda	UPND	
Milanzi	Lumankio Zulu	Independent	
Lusangazi Central	Douglas Lungu	UPND	New constituency
Lumezi South	Oliver Mwale	NRPUP	New constituency
Kaumbwe	Charles Tembo	Independent	
Kapoche	Enock Kaimba	Resolute Party	
Nchanga	Rosemary Chipoya	NRPUP	
Lukusashi	Andrew Mpyakula	UPND	constituency was previously called Muchinga
Lufubu	Lewis Chitaila	UPND	
Chitambo	Nelson Kabanda	UPND	
Mkushi North	Mabvuto Nyirenda	NRPUP	
Chisamba	Martin G. Chowa	UPND	
Mwomboshi	Chushi Kasanda	UPND	Re-elected; New constituency
Keembe East	Emmanuel Chiminsa	UPND	
Keembe West	Princess Kasune	UPND	Re-elected; New constituency; Minister of Tourism
Kapiri Mposhi East	Davison Matutu	UPND	
Kapiri Mposhi West	Stanley Kakubo	UPND	Re-elected; New constituency
Mkushi South	Sydney Chisanga	UPND	New constituency
Luano	Christopher Chibuye	UPND	Re-elected; Defeated incumbent; Minister of Culture and Arts
Mumbwa Central	Clarence Chisuku	UPND	
Mumbwa West	Stella Biemba Chilonda	UPND	New constituency
Mwembezhi East	Ferd Shikabwali	UPND	
Mwembezhi West	Austin C. Milambo	UPND	New constituency
Kabwe Central	Chrizoster Halwindi	UPND	Re-elected
Chambishi	Rashida Mulenga	UPND	New constituency
Chingola West	Chipoka Mulenga	UPND	Re-elected; New constituency
Kalulushi	Kampamba Mulenga	UPND	Re-elected
Lufwanyama East	Elisha Matambo	UPND	New constituency; Minister of Water Development and Sanitation
Lufwanyama West	Kenny Siachisumo	UPND	Re-elected
Mufulira	Elijah K. Biyete	UPND	Defeated incumbent
Mpongwe East	Emmanuel Masanga	UPND	Defeated incumbent; new constituency
Mpongwe West	Emmanuel Kasambo	UPND	
Roan	Joel Chibuye	UPND	Re-elected
Bwana Mkubwa	Warren Chisha Mwambazi	NRPUP	Re-elected
Chingola Central	Michelle Phiri	NRPUP	
Chimwemwe	Musenge L. Mwenya	NRPUP	
Dag Hammarskjöld	Ezra Tembo	NRPUP	New constituency
Kabushi	Tillas T. Sichinga	NRPUP	
Kamfinsa	Kelvin Chipili	NRPUP	
Kwacha	Brian Chirambo	NRPUP	
Luanshya	Golden Mulenga	NRPUP	
Nkana	Alexander Chiteme	NRPUP	
Wusakile	Pavyuma Kalobo	NRPUP	Re-elected
Kankoyo	Edward Chomba	Independent	Defeated incumbent
Kantanshi	Chanda P. Kabwe	Resolute Party	Defeated incumbent
Chililabombwe	Nsofwa K. Lupele	Resolute Party	Defeated incumbent
Ndola Central	Emmanuel Mulenga	Resolute Party	Defeated incumbent
Chama South	Jerrix Nkhata	Independent	
Chasefu North	Towani R. Chipeta	Independent	New constituency
Chipangali West	Vincent Mwale	Independent	New constituency
Malambo East	Faith Lungu	Independent	
Chadiza East	Yamikani Phiri	UPND	New constituency
Chasefu South	Misheck Nyambose	UPND	Re-elected; Minister of Labour and Social Security
Chipangali East	Andrew Z. Lubusha	UPND	Re-elected
Chipata Central	George Mwanza	UPND	
Luangeni	Moses Moyo	UPND	Re-elected; Minister of Agriculture
Chadiza West	Obet Phiri	NRPUP	Defeated incumbent
Chama Central	Yotam Mtayachalo	NRPUP	Re-elected; New constituency
Chama North	Benson Njobvu	NRPUP	
Chipata North	Jackson Ngoma	NRPUP	New constituency
Kasenengwa	Phillimon Twasa	NRPUP	Re-elected
Lundazi	Brenda Nyirenda	NRPUP	Re-elected
Malambo West	Patrick Mwale	NRPUP	New constituency
Mkaika	Mustapher Banda	NRPUP	
Msanzala	Amon Mumba	Independent	Defeated incumbent
Nyimba North	Paul Lungu	NRPUP	New constituency
Nyimba South	Mackson C. Kapantha	NRPUP	
Petauke Central	Pauline L. Banda	NRPUP	
Vubwi	Margaret Miti	NRPUP	Defeated incumbent
Bahati	Sydney P. Kaweme	NRPUP	Defeated incumbent
Feira	Emmanuel Tembo	NRPUP	Re-elected
Mwansabombwe	Kabaso Kampampi	NRPUP	Re-elected
Sinda	Masautso K. Tembo	NRPUP	Re-elected
Mpanda	Patrick Ndolesha	NRPUP	New constituency
Chipili	Robert Musonda	Citizens First	
Mafinga South	Faith Munthali	Citizens First	New constituency
Mafinga North	Owen K. Mutambo	Zambia Must Prosper	
Chembe	Kasongo Chomba	NRPUP	Defeated incumbent
Chifunabuli North	Julien Nyemba	NRPUP	Re-elected
Kawambwa	Danstan Mwansa	NRPUP	Defeated incumbent
Kalungwishi	Christine P. Chipota	NRPUP	New constituency
Luongo	Geoffrey Mulenga	NRPUP	New constituency
Mambilima	Jean N. Chisenga	NRPUP	Re-elected
Mansa East	Webby Simwayi	NRPUP	New constituency
Milenge	Gystave Chonde	NRPUP	Re-elected
Mwense	David Mabumba	NRPUP	Re-elected
Pambashe	Williams Mwenya	UPND	
Luapula	Beauty Kaya	UPND	
Chifunabuli South	Peter Kapala	UPND	New constituency; Minister of Electricity
Mansa West	Chitalu Chilufya	Independent	Re-elected
Nchelenge	Bwalya M. Kabwe	Resolute Party	Defeated incumbent
Chawama	Abel Ng'andu	UPND	Defeated incumbent
Chilanga North	Sipho Hlazo	UPND	New constituency
Chilanga South	Ngenda Situmbeko	UPND	Re-elected
Chongwe West	Martin L. Chasha	UPND	New constituency
Kafue East	Buumba Malambo	UPND	New constituency
Kafue West	Obvious S. Mwaliteta	UPND	
Kanyama	Cleopatra M. Hamaambo	UPND	
Lusaka Central	Msaiwale J. Mlewa	UPND	
Matero	Alexander M. Sakala	UPND	
Munali	Thomas Sipalo	UPND	
Roma	Ross J. Kasikili	UPND	New constituency
Rufunsa	Sheal S. Mulyata	UPND	Re-elected; Minister of Community Development and Social Services
Makeni	Beene Hachoombwa	UPND	New constituency
Nkombwa	Jairo Simbeye	Independent	New constituency
Chongwe East	Anita Kamanga	Independent	Defeated incumbent
Chifubu	Kondwani J. Winga	Independent	Defeated incumbent
Lima	Kelvin Kaunda	NRPUP	New constituency
Chinsali Central	Mwansa Chanda	NRPUP	
Chilinda	Kalalwe A. Mukosa	NRPUP	New constituency
Isoka	Sichone Malozo	NRPUP	Defeated incumbent
Kanchibiya	Sampa Muswema	NRPUP	Defeated incumbent
Lwitikila	Kanungwe C. Kanyanyamina	NRPUP	New constituency
Mfuwe	Nicholas Mumbi	NRPUP	Defeated incumbent
Mpika North	Francis Kapyanga	NRPUP	Re-elected
Mpika South	Primose C. Chanda	NRPUP	New constituency
Mwenzo	Luka Simumba	NRPUP	New constituency
Shiwa Ng'andu	Stephen Kampyongo	NRPUP	Re-elected
Chilubi	Mathias Chitembo	UPND	Defeated incumbent
Kaputa	Elvis Nkandu	UPND	Re-elected; Minister of Information and Media
Kundabwika	Maxas K. Ng'onga	UPND	New constituency
Lunte	Katongo Chasaya	UPND	
Luwingu Central	Patrick M. Mucheleka	UPND	New constituency; Minister of Lands
Mporokoso	Wedden Chileshe	UPND	
Saise	Remmy Sikazwe	UPND	New constituency
Bangweulu	Happy D. Mampa	UPND	Defeated incumbent
Chimbamilonga	Titus M. Chipili	NRPUP	
Mpulungu North	Freedom C. Sikazwe	NRPUP	
Mpulungu South	Teddy Mutale	NRPUP	New constituency
Solwezi Central	Kawina P. Poho	Independent	
Zambezi Central	Rapheal K. Ngimbu	Independent	New constituency
Zambezi East	Jonathan L. Mwendelema	Independent	Defeated incumbent
Mufumbwe	Nshamba Muzungu	Independent	Defeated incumbent
Mwandi	Iris Kaingu	Independent	Defeated incumbent
Chavuma	Victor Lumayi	UPND	Re-elected
Dongwe	Davies Mbalau	UPND	New constituency
Ikeleng'i	Paul Masuwa	UPND	
Kabompo East	Ambrose Lufuma	UPND	Re-elected; Minister of Defence
Kabompo West	Hilary Chipango	UPND	New constituency
Kalumbila	Nicholas M. Mukumbi	UPND	Re-elected
Kasempa	Brenda Tambatamba	UPND	Re-elected; Minister of Mines and Minerals Development
Manyinga	Robert Lihefu	UPND	Re-elected
Mufwashi	Brian Kakonkanya	UPND	New constituency
Mushindamo	Alex Katakwe	UPND	Re-elected
Mwinilunga East	Lualaba J. Mukanzu	UPND	New constituency
Mwinilunga West	Jonathan K. Kapaipi	UPND	
Solwezi North	Stafford Mulusa	UPND	New constituency; Re-elected
Zambezi West	Vumango P. Musumali	UPND	Re-elected
Lumwana	Mathews Mashimango	UPND	New constituency
Nangoma	Collins Nzovu	UPND	Re-elected; Minister of Infrastructure and Urban Development
Chiengi	Favourite Musangu	UPND	
Nkundalila	Emmanuel Banda	UPND	New constituency
Serenje	Friday Katombi	UPND	Defeated incumbent
Kafulafuta	Eleni E. Grigorakis	UPND	Defeated incumbent
Kalalangabo	Micheal Zondani Katambo	UPND	New constituency; Re-elected
Masaiti	Shevy Mukabila	UPND	
Bweengwa	Kasauta S. Michelo	UPND	Re-elected
Chikankata	Jaqueline Sabao	UPND	Re-elected
Choma Central	Cornelius Mweetwa	UPND	Re-elected
Choma South	Trevor S. Mwiinde	UPND	New constituency
Dundumwenzi	Edgar Sing'ombe	UPND	Re-elected
Gwembe	Tyson Simuzingili	UPND	Re-elected
Itezhi-Tezhi East	Credo Nanjuwa	UPND	Re-elected; New constituency
Itezhi-Tezhi West	Twaambo Mutinta	UPND	Re-elected
Kalomo Central	Harry S. Kamboni	UPND	Re-elected; Minister of Education
Kalomo South	Edgar Siakacoma	UPND	New constituency
Kazungula North	Clement Andeleki	UPND	Re-elected; Minister of Home Affairs and Internal Security
Kazungula South	Siasiloka Mukuni	UPND	New constituency
Livingstone Central	Gracious Mayangwa	UPND	
Maramba	Yvonne Kabba	UPND	New constituency
Mazabuka Central	Vincent Lilanda	UPND	Defeated incumbent
Magoye East	Mweemba Malambo	UPND	Re-elected
Magoye West	Nachombe Kabunda	UPND	New constituency
Mbabala	Joseph S. Munsanje	UPND	Re-elected
Monze Central	Yvonne Shakantu	UPND	
Monze East	Jacob Mwiimbu	UPND	New constituency; Re-elected; Minister of Justice
Moomba	Fred C. Chaatila	UPND	Re-elected
Namwala East	Olive C. Chiboola	UPND	New constituency; Minister of Fisheries and Livestock
Namwala West	Herbert Mapani	UPND	Re-elected
Pemba	Obey H. Habeenzu	UPND	
Siavonga	Darius Mulunda	UPND	Re-elected
Sinazongwe	Nchimunya Siakole	UPND	
Kalabo Central	Akufuna Simushi	UPND	
Kalabo South	Chinga Miyutu	UPND	Re-elected; New constituency
Kaoma Central	Morgan S. Sitwala	UPND	Re-elected
Liuwa	Situmbeko Musokotwane	UPND	Re-elected; Minister of Finance and National Planning
Luampa East	Makozo Chikote	UPND	Re-elected; Minister of Petroleum
Luampa West	Chinyama M. Sachiyenge	UPND	New constituency
Luena	Maliti M. Chimwaso	UPND	
Lukulu North	Kahale F. Kahale	UPND	New constituency
Lukulu South	Christopher K. Kalila	UPND	Re-elected; Minister of Housing
Mangango	Luhamba Mwene	UPND	Re-elected
Mitete	Misheck Mutelo	UPND	Re-elected
Mongu Central	Makai Makai	UPND	
Mongu East	Christopher M. Nawa	UPND	New constituency
Nalolo	Imanga Wamunyima	UPND	Re-elected
Nalikwanda	Warren Sibote	UPND	
Nkeyema	Kapelwa Mbangweta	UPND	Re-elected
Senanga North	Brian M. Ndumba	UPND	New constituency
Senanga South	Likando M. Mufalali	UPND	Defeated incumbent; Minister of Youth and Sports
Sesheke East	Romeo Kang'ombe	UPND	Re-elected
Sesheke West	Fredrick L. Misebezi	UPND	New constituency
Shang'ombo North	Beauty N. Moola	UPND	
Shang'ombo South	Mubika Mubika	UPND	Re-elected
Sikongo	Mayungo Simushi	UPND	Re-elected
Sioma	Kaliye Mandandi	UPND	Re-elected
Katuba	Nkulukusa Mwabashike	UPND	Re-elected
Konkola	Lucky Sichone	UPND	New constituency
Bwacha North	Percy K. Chato	UPND	New constituency
Bwacha South	Sydney Mushanga	UPND	Re-elected
Mapatizya	Emeldah Mushabantu	UPND	Re-elected
Malole	Vernon B. Bwato	Independent	
Senga Hill	Mukwavi C. Sichula	Independent	Defeated incumbent
Chirundu	James K. Mwanja	Independent	
Mulobezi	Hastings Sililo	Independent	
Lumezi North	Anderson Banda	UPND	Declared as duly elected on 8 October 2026 after the opposing party withdrew from the by-election that was scheduled after the death of a candidate.
Mandevu	Adrian Banda	UPND	Declared as duly elected on 30 October 2026 after the other contestants withdrew from the by-election that was scheduled after an attack on the totalling centre destroyed equipment on the election day.

=== Non-elected members ===
Type	Member	Party	Portfolio
Nominated	Charles Milupi	Alliance for Democracy and Development	Minister of Transport and Logistics
Nominated	Felix Mutati	Movement for Democratic Change	Minister of Technology and Science
Nominated	Roma Chilengi	United Party for National Development	Minister of Health
Nominated	Gilbert Siame	United Party for National Development	Minister of Green Economy and Environment
Nominated	Mulambo Haimbe	United Party for National Development	Minister of Foreign Affairs and International Cooperation
Nominated	Douglas Syakalima	United Party for National Development	Minister of Skills and Higher Education
Nominated	Mubita Anakoka	United Party for National Development	
Nominated	Noel Nkoma	United Party for National Development	
Vice-President	Mutale Nalumango	United Party for National Development	Leader of Government Business in Parliament

=== Proportional-representation ===
No.	Name	Party	PR category	Ref
1	Mutinta Musokotwane	UPND	Women	
2	Mirriam Chonya	UPND	Women	
3	Gertrude Imenda	UPND	Women	
4	Clarissa Chikamba	UPND	Women	
5	Caroline Katotobwe	UPND	Women	
6	Catherine Kantumoya	UPND	Women	
7	Judith Kabemba	UPND	Women	
8	Susan Tembo	UPND	Women	
9	Irene Muyenga	UPND	Women	
10	Ketty Nanyangwe	UPND	Women	
11	Grace Sampa Malunga	UPND	Women	
12	Melissa Chinyemba	UPND	Women	
13	Samwata Manyingu	UPND	Women	
14	Esnart Sakala	UPND	Women	
15	Moomba Mbolongwe Thornicroft	UPND	Women	
16	Chama Chileshe	UPND	Women	
17	Chilufya Chikongolo	UPND	Women	
18	Julian Kangwa	NRPUP	Women	
19	Mubanga Kapambwe	NRPUP	Women	
20	Susan Petwe	NRPUP	Women	
21	Michelo Chizombe	UPND	Youth	
22	Jemimah Mwaba	UPND	Youth	
23	Fatima Moono Sicheele	UPND	Youth	
24	Christine Bwembya	UPND	Youth	
25	Nelia Shikombelo	UPND	Youth	
26	Mukumbuta Mubiana	UPND	Youth	
27	Vincent Musilikani	UPND	Youth	
28	Mwanto Kabaso	UPND	Youth	
29	Don Mwenda	UPND	Youth	
30	Gabriel Simutowe	UPND	Youth	
31	Nsama Mpundu	UPND	Youth	
32	Lloyd Nsonga	UPND	Youth	
33	Chanda Chunda	NRPUP	Youth	
34	Collins Kampamba	NRPUP	Youth	
35	Harry Simuntala	NRPUP	Youth	
36	Francis Kope	UPND	Persons with disabilities	
37	Misheck Mweemba	UPND	Persons with disabilities	
38	Lazarus Hakalebula	UPND	Persons with disabilities	
39	Kennedy Phiri	NRPUP	Persons with disabilities	
40	Mumba Mubanga	NRPUP	Persons with disabilities	
