= List of political parties in Zambia =

Zambia is a multi-party system with the United Party for National Development in government. Opposition parties are allowed and do have some significant representation in government.

== Active parties ==
=== Parties represented in the national assembly ===
Party	Abbr.	Leader	Political position	Ideology	MPs
United Party for National Development	UPND	Hakainde Hichilema	Centre-right	Liberalism; Agrarianism	136 / 226
National Reconciliation Party for Unity and Prosperity	NRPUP	Ezra Tembo			60 / 226
Resolute Party	RP	Martin Phiri			5 / 226
Citizens First	CF	Harry Kalaba			2 / 226
Zambia Must Prosper	ZMP	Kelvin Fube Bwalya			1 / 226

=== Other parties ===
- Alliance for Democracy and Development (ADD)
- ALL Peoples Congress Party (APC)
- Common Cause for Democracy
- Democratic Party
- Agenda for Development party for the People (ADP)
- Forum for Democracy and Development
- Green Party
- Merge Zambia Party (MZ)
- Movement for Multi-Party Democracy (MMD)
- National Alliance Party
- National Restoration Party (NAREP)
- New Heritage Party (NHP)
- New Era Democratic Party (NED)
- Party of National Unity and Progress (PNUP)
- Patriotic Front (PF)
- People’s Convention Independence Party
- People's Party
- Rainbow Party
- Republican Progressive Party (RPP)
- Social Democratic Party
- Socialist Party (SP)
- United Liberal Party
- United National Independence Party (UNIP)
- United Prosperous and Peaceful Zambia (UPPZ)
- The Zambia We Want Party (ZWW)
- Zambia Republican Party (ZRP)
- Zambia Wake Up Party (ZAWAPA)

== Defunct parties ==
- Zambian African National Congress (1948–1972)
- Zambian African National Congress (1958–1959)
- United Progressive Party (1971–1972)
- New Generation Party
- National Democratic Alliance (1990-?)

== See also ==
- Politics of Zambia
- List of political parties by country
- Bibliography of the history of Zambia
