= Chilinda (constituency) =

National Assembly constituency in Zambia

Chilinda is a constituency of the National Assembly of Zambia. It was created in 2026 by splitting Chinsali constituency. It covers the northern part of Chinsali District, including Chilinda and Malalo.

== List of MPs ==
Election year	MP	Party
2026	Kalalwe Mukosa	National Reconciliation Party for Unity and Prosperity
