= Constitution of Zambia (Amendment) Act, No. 13 of 2025 =

Constitutional amendment in Zambia

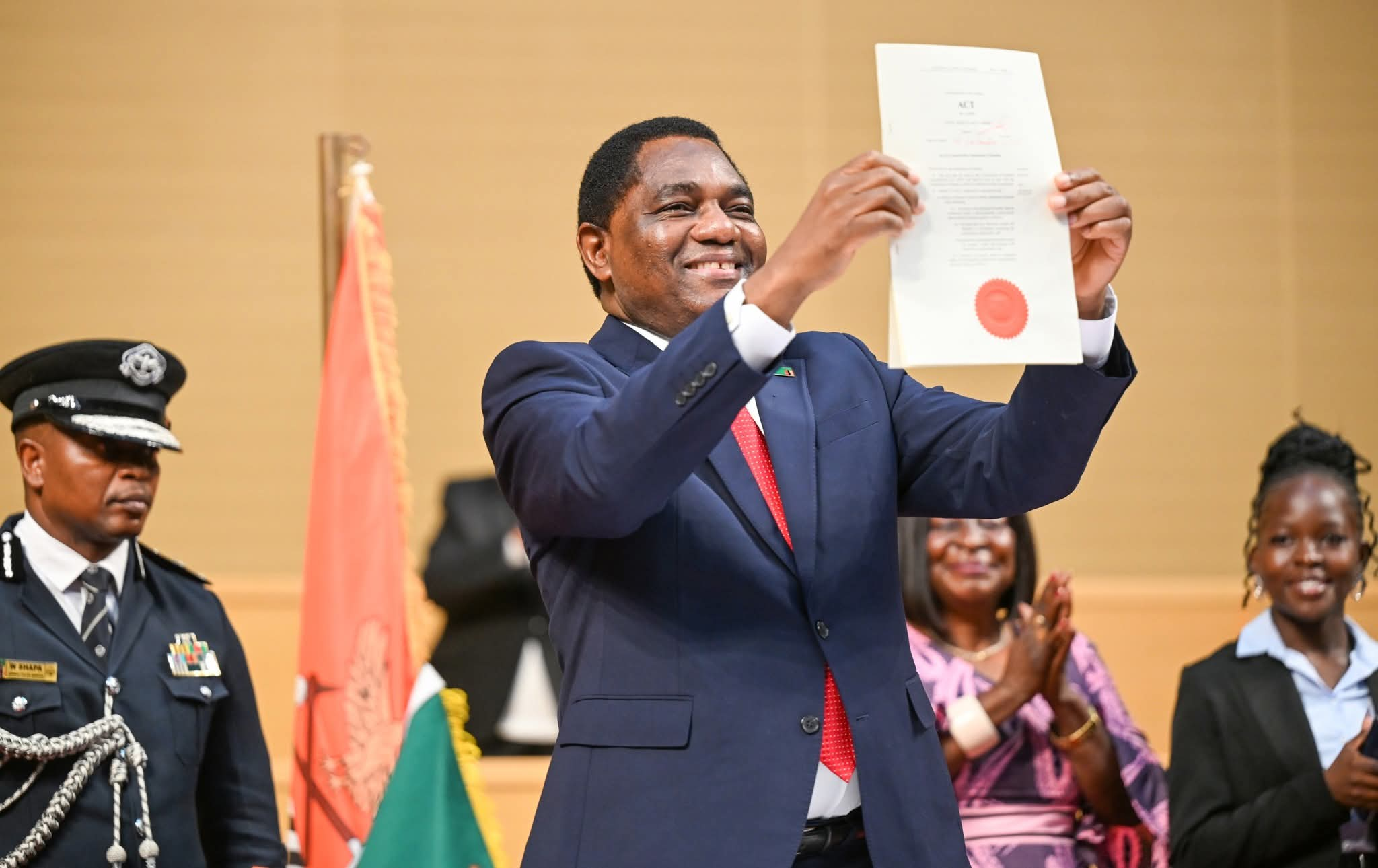
- President Hichilema presents newly signed Bill 7 into Law.

National Assembly of Zambia
- Long title: Bill for an Act to amend the Constitution of Zambia
- Passed by: National Assembly of Zambia
- Passed: 15 December 2025
- Assented to by: Hakainde Hichilema
- Assented to: 18 December 2025
- Bill citation: The Constitution of Zambia (Amendment) Bill, 2025
- Introduced by: Ministry of Justice
- Introduced: May 2025
- Voting summary: 135 voted for; None voted against; None abstained
- Status: In force

The Constitution of Zambia (Amendment) Act, No. 13 of 2025 (commonly referred to as Bill 7) is a constitutional amendment law of Zambia that was enacted following its passage by the National Assembly of Zambia on 15 December 2025 and assent by President Hakainde Hichilema on 18 December 2025. The legislation amends several provisions of the Constitution of Zambia, addressing matters relating to the composition of the National Assembly, electoral arrangements, nomination procedures, and other governance-related provisions.

The Bill was originally introduced in May 2025 by the Ministry of Justice and generated extensive national debate and opposition from civil society organisations, opposition political parties, and professional bodies, who raised concerns regarding both its substance and the process used in its development. On 27 June 2025, the Constitutional Court of Zambia declared the Bill unconstitutional, ruling that it failed to comply with Article 79 of the Constitution, which requires wide public consultation prior to the initiation of constitutional amendments.

Following the Court’s ruling, the government instituted a consultative review process through the appointment of a Technical Committee on Constitutional Amendments. After nationwide consultations and revisions to some provisions, the Bill was reintroduced to Parliament. On 15 December 2025, the National Assembly adopted the amended Bill at its Third Reading after securing the constitutionally required two-thirds majority, with 135 Members of Parliament voting in favour and none voting against or abstaining. The Act came into force upon presidential assent on 18 December 2025. Upon signing, Hichilema stated: “Now that it is law, I declare that the debate is now behind us.

== Objects of the Bill ==
The objects of this Bill are to amend the Constitution of Zambia so as to:

- (a) revise the composition of the National Assembly to provide for the increase in the number of constituency-based seats from 156 to 211 to actualize the delimitation report by the Electoral Commission;
- (b) revise the electoral system for election to the National Assembly to provide for a mixed-member proportional representation electoral system to guarantee the representation of women, youths, and persons with disabilities;
- (c) revise the provision relating to filing of fresh nominations on resignation of a candidate;
- (d) revise the provisions relating to by-elections;
- (e) revise the number of nominated Members of Parliament;
- (f) harmonize the term of Parliament and council to achieve a five-year term;
- (g) provide for a vacancy in the office of Minister and Provincial Minister ninety days before a general election;
- (h) remove the two-term limit for office of mayor and council chairperson;
- (i) revise the composition of the council to include Members of Parliament holding constituency-based seats;
- (j) revise the qualifications for appointment to the office of Secretary to the Cabinet;
- (k) provide for the Attorney-General and Solicitor-General to continue in office after a general election until new office bearers are appointed;
- (l) revise the definition of the words “child” and “adult”;
- (m) provide clarity on the period within which an election petition shall be concluded; and
- (n) provide for matters connected with, or incidental to, the foregoing.

== Legislative history ==
=== Petition before the Constitutional Court ===
The petition that brought Constitution (Amendment) Bill No. 7 before the Constitutional Court was filed in March 2025, prior to the Bill being formally tabled in Parliament. In March 2025, Members of Parliament Munir Zulu and Celestine Mukandila lodged the petition shortly after the government announced its intention to undertake constitutional reforms. The petition challenged the process adopted by the Executive, arguing that it violated constitutional principles and national values by initiating constitutional amendments without a people-driven process and wide public consultation. On 25 May 2025, while the petition was still pending before the Court, the Minister of Justice formally presented the Constitution (Amendment) Bill No. 7 to the National Assembly. On 27 June 2025, the Constitutional Court delivered its judgment on the March petition, ruling that the process leading to the Bill was unconstitutional due to the failure to comply with Article 79 of the Constitution, which requires wide public consultation before constitutional amendments are initiated.

=== Constitutional Court ruling ===
On 27 June 2025, the Constitutional Court of Zambia declared the Bill unconstitutional, ruling that it failed to comply with Article 79 of the Constitution, which requires wide public consultation before the enactment of constitutional amendments. The Court emphasised that constitutional reforms must be people-driven and not initiated solely by the Executive or Legislature.

The Law Association of Zambia (LAZ) welcomed the ruling and called for future constitutional reforms to be preceded by tangible and visible consultations led by an independent, non-partisan committee of experts to ensure legitimacy and compliance with constitutional principles. As a result of the ruling, the Bill was rendered legally void in its original form. The government subsequently indicated that broader consultations would be undertaken before pursuing further constitutional amendments.

=== Reintroduction following the Constitutional Court ruling ===
Following the Constitutional Court’s decision of 27 June 2025, which rendered the original Constitution (Amendment) Bill No. 7 of 2025 unconstitutional due to non-compliance with Article 79 of the Constitution, the government halted further progression of the Bill in its initial form. In response, the Executive undertook measures intended to cure the procedural defects identified by the Court. On 2 October 2025, President Hakainde Hichilema appointed a 25-member Technical Committee on Constitutional Amendments (TCCA), mandated to conduct nationwide consultations and to review the proposed constitutional amendments in line with the Court’s guidance and the requirement for a people-driven reform process. The committee engaged stakeholders across the country and subsequently submitted its recommendations to the government.

Based on the TCCA’s consultative process and recommendations, the government revised a number of provisions contained in the original Bill. The Minister of Justice thereafter reintroduced Constitution (Amendment) Bill No. 7 of 2025 to the National Assembly, with the government maintaining that the revised process satisfied the requirements of Article 79 of the Constitution. Parliament proceeded to consider the amended Bill on the basis that the procedural shortcomings identified by the Constitutional Court had been addressed through the consultative process.

== Controversy and criticism ==
The Bill attracted substantial criticism from civil society organisations, opposition political parties, and legal experts, particularly regarding its scope, process, and constitutional implications.

- Centralisation of power: Critics argued that the proposed amendments would increase presidential influence and consolidate political power among incumbents, potentially weakening checks and balances.
- Democratic accountability: The proposal to remove by-elections within 180 days of general elections was viewed by opponents as reducing opportunities for voter representation and weakening democratic accountability.
- Transparency and public consultation: Observers raised concerns over limited transparency in the delimitation process and an absence of broad public consultation prior to the Bill’s introduction, which they argued undermined its legitimacy.

=== Law Association of Zambia ===
On 4 June 2025, the Law Association of Zambia (LAZ) called for the withdrawal of Constitution (Amendment) Bill No. 7 of 2025, citing a lack of broad-based stakeholder engagement and meaningful public participation in the constitutional amendment process. LAZ argued that the Bill had been published in the Government Gazette without a clearly defined pathway for citizen participation prior to its introduction in Parliament, and that the government had not disclosed the processes or stakeholders involved in drafting the proposed amendments. It warned that proceeding without a people-driven process, as required under Article 79 of the Constitution, risked undermining democratic accountability and constitutional legitimacy.

=== Church bodies ===
In July 2025, major church bodies in Zambia jointly called for the withdrawal of Constitution (Amendment) Bill No. 7 of 2025, citing concerns over the constitutionality and legitimacy of the process used to advance the Bill. In a letter addressed to the Secretary to the Cabinet, representatives of the Zambia Conference of Catholic Bishops (ZCCB), the Council of Churches in Zambia (CCZ), and the Evangelical Fellowship of Zambia (EFZ) argued that the process lacked legitimacy and failed to meet constitutional requirements for a people-driven reform. The church leaders referenced the Constitutional Court’s 27 June 2025 ruling and urged the government to respect the decision and ensure that any future constitutional reforms are inclusive, consultative, and grounded in broad national consensus.

=== Civil society organisations ===
On 29 May 2025, a coalition of civil society organisations issued a joint statement opposing Constitution (Amendment) Bill No. 7 of 2025, citing serious concerns with both the process and substance of the proposed reforms. The organisations argued that the reform process lacked transparency, meaningful public consultation, and an evidence-based foundation. They criticised proposals relating to the introduction of a mixed-member proportional representation system, the increase in the number of constituencies, changes to by-elections, dissolution timelines for Parliament, the reintroduction of Members of Parliament into local councils, the removal of term limits for mayors, the weakening of qualification requirements for the Secretary to the Cabinet, and the expansion of presidential nominees in Parliament.

The statement warned that the proposed amendments risk undermining democratic accountability, separation of powers, devolution, and fiscal sustainability. The civil society groups called for the withdrawal of the Bill and the establishment of a comprehensive, inclusive, and citizen-driven constitutional reform process grounded in broad national consensus.

== Final passage of the amended Bill ==
Vote	Number of MPs	Notes
Yes	135	All present MPs voted in favour
No	0	None voted against
Abstained	0	None abstained
Absent	32	Total MPs 167 minus 135 present

Following the conclusion of the TCCA’s consultative process, the government incorporated elements of the committee’s recommendations into a revised version of the Bill. The Minister of Justice, Princess Kasune, presented the amended Bill to the National Assembly on 14 December 2025.

On 15 December 2025, the Constitution of Zambia (Amendment) Bill No. 7 of 2025 was tabled for its Second and Third Reading, debated, and adopted by the National Assembly after securing the constitutionally required two-thirds majority. A total of 135 Members of Parliament voted in favour of the Bill, with none voting against or abstaining. The Speaker of the National Assembly ruled that the constitutional threshold had been satisfied, and the Bill was subsequently submitted to the President for assent, after which Parliament adjourned sine die.

=== Parliamentary tensions and party positions ===
On the day scheduled for the final vote on Constitution (Amendment) Bill No. 7 on 15 December 2025, the parliamentary process was marked by heightened political tension. Patriotic Front National Chairperson Jean Kapata warned PF Members of Parliament that any member who voted in favour of the Bill would be considered automatically expelled from the party. PF Lukashya Member of Parliament George Chisanga stated that opposition MPs had resolved to abscond the sitting, alleging that some ruling party MPs were being confined to ensure support for the Bill. Meanwhile, Chief Government Spokesperson Cornelius Mweetwa expressed confidence that the Bill would secure the required two-thirds majority. The Zambia Police Service announced it had received intelligence warning of possible attempts to disrupt parliamentary proceedings, stating that security measures had been put in place around the National Assembly and surrounding areas.

== Reactions ==
=== Executive and Political Response ===
Following the adoption of the bill, President Hakainde Hichilema issued a statement welcoming the passage of the Constitution (Amendment) Bill No. 7, characterizing it as a "defining moment" for Zambia’s democracy and national unity. Hichilema called on the government, the opposition, and the general public to set aside political differences to focus on national development under the principles of "One Zambia, One Nation."

The bill's passage led to immediate repercussions within the opposition Patriotic Front (PF). On 19 December, acting PF faction president Given Lubinda expelled all PF lawmakers who had voted in favor of the amendment. Lubinda accused the Members of Parliament of betraying the party and the Zambian people, describing their support for the bill as a "stab in the back." However, Brenda Nyirenda, the Deputy Secretary General of the same PF faction, criticized the expulsions, stating that Lubinda’s decision demonstrated a failure to unite the party.

=== Legal and Civil Society Criticism ===
The legislative process faced significant criticism from legal and civil rights groups. Lawyer and activist Makebi Zulu condemned the vote as a "direct defiance" of the Constitutional Court and a threat to constitutionalism. Zulu argued that proceeding with the bill despite judicial rulings undermined the rule of law, and he accused lawmakers of prioritizing political interests over constitutional obligations.

The bill's passage also prompted new legal challenges. On 13 December, Celestine Mukandila and former Lumezi Member of Parliament Munir Zulu filed a petition with the Constitutional Court, alleging that the lawmakers had acted in defiance of a standing court order.

Transparency International Zambia (TI-Z) also issued a public rebuke of Speaker of the National Assembly Nelly Mutti. On 17 December, the organization stated that the Speaker's "celebratory remarks and gestures" following the vote were inappropriate, given the ongoing national concerns regarding the bill’s constitutional legitimacy.

== See also ==
- Constitution of Zambia
- Politics of Zambia
- National Assembly of Zambia
