= Thomas Sipalo =

- Sipalo taking oath in during the Swearing-in process.

Member of the National Assembly of Zambia
- Incumbent
- Assumed office 7 September 2026
- Preceded by: Mike Mposha
- Constituency: Munali

Personal details
- Party: United Party for National Development
- Profession: Comedian

Thomas Sipalo, known professionally as Difikoti and also as Professor Difikoti, is a Zambian comedian, actor and politician. He is a member of the United Party for National Development (UPND) and has represented Munali Constituency in the National Assembly of Zambia since 2026. He is best known for his work as part of the comedy duo Bikiloni and Difikoti, which dates back to 2006. The duo later produced short comedy skits for Muvi TV, before Sipalo went on to appear in the Zambezi Magic television sitcom Security Guards.

Sipalo entered electoral politics in the 2021 general election, when he contested the Munali parliamentary seat as an independent candidate. He later joined the UPND and contested the seat again in the 2026 general election as the party's candidate. He was elected with 27,242 votes, defeating Resolute Party candidate Chrispin Chiinda, who received 20,988 votes. He was sworn in as a Member of Parliament on 7 September 2026 at the National Assembly in Lusaka.
