= Mpulungu North =

National Assembly constituency in Zambia

Mpulungu North is a constituency of the National Assembly of Zambia. It was created in 2026 when Mpulungu constituency was split into two constituencies (Mpulungu North and Mpulungu South). It covers the northern part of Mpulungu District, including the town of Mpulungu.

== List of MPs ==
Election year	MP	Party
2026	Freedom Sikazwe	National Reconciliation Party for Unity and Prosperity
