= Tonse Alliance =

Zambian political alliance

- Leader: Brian Mundubile
- Founder: Edgar Lungu
- Founded: 7 November 2024
- Colours: Blue
- National Assembly: 5 / 266

Tonse Alliance is a Zambian alliance of political parties whose goal was to remove the United Party for National Development from government at the 2026 general election.

It was formed in November 2024 in Lusaka and the alliance chose former Zambia president Edgar Lungu to be the Alliance Chairperson and presidential candidate for 2026.

Members of the Tonse Alliance include the Christian Democratic Party, New Era Democratic Party, Zambia Republican Party, Forum for Democracy and Development, Umozi Kumawa and the Centre for Constitutionalism and Legal Justice among others.

On 5 June 2025, the Tonse Alliance announced the death of their chairman, former President Edgar Lungu. In January 2026, a convention was held in which Brian Mundubile was selected as his replacement.

== History ==
In September 2024, the New Congress Party (NCP) led by Peter Chanda joined the Tonse Alliance after deciding to leave the United Kwacha Alliance (UKA). Several parties within UKA, including the Patriots for Economic Progress led by Sean Tembo and the Christian Democratic Party led by Dan Pule, decided to associate with the Tonse Alliance, which led to their removal from UKA.

An invitation was sent to the Patriotic Front (PF) faction led by Edgar Lungu, which was also part of UKA at the time, to join the Tonse Alliance, with a promise for Lungu to be the alliance's candidate at the 2026 general election. The PF accepted the invitation, with Lungu accepting his adoption as the 2026 election candidate and being appointed as the chairperson of the alliance, with Dan Pule being appointed as the vice chairperson and Sean Tembo being appointed as the spokesperson of the alliance.

The alliance officially launched on 7 November 2024, where it was revealed that the political parties forming the alliance include the New Congress Party, Patriotic Front, Patriots for Economic Progress, Christian Democratic Party, Zambia Republican Party and New Era Democratic Party. Organizations supporting the alliance include the Centre for Constitutionalism and Legal Justice and Umozi Kumawa among others. The alliance was joined in January 2025 by the Forum for Democracy and Development (FDD) and Zambia Must Prosper (ZMP).

The alliance decided in November 2024 that in upcoming by-elections at constituency and ward level, only one party would be used for candidacy, namely the New Congress Party. They fielded a candidate the following month in the Kawambwa constituency by-election, with their candidate finishing as the runner-up. For the Petauke Central constituency by-election in February 2025, the alliance fielded a candidate (Simon Banda) and won, giving the New Congress Party a seat in parliament. They fielded a candidate in June 2025 in the Lumezi constituency by-election, with their candidate finishing as the runner-up. They fielded a candidate in August 2025 in the Mfuwe constituency by-election with their candidate finishing as the runner-up.

After Edgar Lungu left Zambia for South Africa in early 2025 for medical purposes, Given Lubinda, who was the Patriotic Front acting president in Lungu's absence, was appointed as the Tonse Alliance acting chairperson. After Lungu's death in June 2025, Lubinda continued to be the acting chairperson of the alliance although some members in the alliance argued that Dan Pule (who was the vice chairperson) should be the acting chairperson due to his position regardless of what late president Lungu had instructed.

In October 2025, the New Congress Party (which was used to win the Petauke Central seat eight months earlier) announced its resignation from the Tonse Alliance. In December 2025, as there was an upcoming by-election in Chawama constituency scheduled for the following month, it was announced that the Tonse Alliance members made a decision to use the Forum for Democracy and Development (FDD) to field their candidate for this election.

On 15 January 2026, the Chawama constituency by-election took place, with the FDD's candidate (Bright Nundwe) winning the by-election, giving the Forum for Democracy and Development a seat in Parliament. On 29 January 2026, a by-election took place in Kasama District to elect a new mayor following the death of the previous mayor, with the FDD's candidate (Peter Yuda Chikweti) finishing as the runner-up with 33% of the vote.

On 7 January 2026, the Patriots for Economic Progress (PEP) party led by Sean Tembo decided to exit from the Tonse Alliance due to internal disagreements. On the same day, Dan Pule made an announcement stating that the alliance members decided to expel the Patriotic Front (PF) from the alliance. Some PF members challenged the decision.

The Zambia Must Prosper (ZMP) party led by Kelvin Fube Bwalya expressed interest in standing for the alliance presidency while it also expressed issues over the alliance membership and leadership after the supposed expulsion of the PF from the alliance. They eventually exited from the Tonse Alliance due to disagreements. Members of the We are One Zambia Alliance (WOZA) merged into the Tonse Alliance on 5 May 2026.

During January 2026, a section of the Tonse Alliance decided to open nominations for the alliance chairperson position as well as for the presidential candidacy for the 2026 general election to happen in August that year. Reports stated that Dan Pule (the president of the Christian Democratic Party) and Brian Mundubile (a Patriotic Front member) had applied for the positions. On 28 January 2026, a convention took place and Mundubile was chosen as the alliance's 2026 presidential candidate and it was maintained that the Forum for Democracy and Development will be the party used for candidacy at the election. So, Brian Mundubile was no-longer regarded as a member of the Patriotic Front. On 11 March 2026, the Patriotic Front formed the PF Pamodzi Alliance and officially decided to step away from the Tonse Alliance.

On 16 May 2026, it was reported that one of the FDD members took the party to court over the convention and agreement that placed Brian Mundubile as the presidential candidate of the party and Mundubile agreed to use a different party from within the Tonse Alliance at the August 2026 general election, namely the National Reconciliation Party for Unity and Prosperity (NRPUP). The PF Pamodzi Alliance led by Makebi Zulu of the Resolute Party (RP) then agreed to an alliance partnership with the Tonse Alliance led by Brian Mundubile for unity in the 2026 general election and an agreement was made for Mundubile to be the presidential candidate of the alliance and Zulu to stand as his running mate (vice president) in the alliance at the election to happen in August that year.

However, at the time, the RP and the NRPUP had both adopted candidates for parliament and local government positions in some districts, which meant that the two parties had candidates that were in competition in those districts while they did not field candidates in 72 of the 226 constituencies in Zambia.

At the 2026 general election on 13 August 2026, the RP won the parliamentary vote in 5 constituencies and the NRPUP won the parliamentary vote in 60 constituencies while Brian Mundubile had finished second to Hakainde Hichilema in the presidential election. RP president Martin Phiri accepted the outcome of the election together with NRPUP president Ezra Tembo while Mundubile and Makebi Zulu were unsatisfied with the election results. In the aftermath of the election, the NRPUP announced on 23 August 2026 that it decided to exit from the Tonse Alliance.

In Mandevu constituency, incidents took place on the voting day that resulted in the Electoral Commission of Zambia calling for a repeat election. The by-election was scheduled for 5 November 2026 and the Tonse-Pamodzi Alliance reverted to using the Forum for Democracy and Development (FDD) to participate in this by-election, selecting a former mayor of Lusaka (Daniel Chisenga) as their candidate. However, it was announced a week before the election date that the FDD candidate had withdrawn.

== Constituent parties ==
The Tonse Alliance is currently composed of the following political parties:

Party	Abbreviation	Ideology	National Assembly of Zambia
Resolute Party	RP		5 / 280
Forum for Democracy and Development	FDD	Social democracy	0 / 280
Zambia Republican Party	ZRP	Progressivism	0 / 280
New Era Democratic Party	NEDP		0 / 280
ALL Peoples Congress Party	APC		0 / 280

=== Former members ===
- Patriotic Front
- National Reconciliation Party for Unity and Prosperity
