= Jaqueline Sabao =

Zambian politician

Member of the National Assembly of Zambia for Chikankata
- Incumbent
- Assumed office 12 August 2021
- Preceded by: Kabwe Mwiinga

Personal details
- Born: 27 September 1975 (age 51)
- Party: United Party for National Development

Jaqueline Sabao (born 27 September 1975) is a Zambian politician from the United Party for National Development (UPND). She is currently serving as the member of parliament for Chikankata.

== Political career ==
Sabao was first elected as the Chikankata member of parliament at the 2021 general election. At the 2026 general election, she was seeking re-election in Chikankata and she was re-elected at the election in August 2026.

== See also ==
- List of members of the National Assembly of Zambia (2021–2026)
- List of members of the National Assembly of Zambia (2026–2031)
