= Mwense (constituency) =

Constituency of the National Assembly of Zambia

Mwense is a constituency of the National Assembly of Zambia. It covers part of Mwense and a rural area to the north of the town in Mwense District of Luapula Province.

== List of MPs ==
Election year	MP	Party
1968	Mathew Lumande	United National Independence Party
1973	Henry Matipa	United National Independence Party
1978	Felix Kapapula	United National Independence Party
1983	Simon Kachasa	United National Independence Party
1988	Felix Kapapula	United National Independence Party
1991	Norman Chibamba	Movement for Multi-Party Democracy
1996	Norman Chibamba	Movement for Multi-Party Democracy
2001	Norman Chibamba	Movement for Multi-Party Democracy
2006	Jacob Chongo	Patriotic Front
2011	David Mabumba	Patriotic Front
2016	David Mabumba	Patriotic Front
2021	David Mabumba	Patriotic Front
2026	David Mabumba	National Reconciliation Party for Unity and Prosperity
