= David Mabumba =

Zambian politician

Member of the National Assembly
- Incumbent
- Assumed office 2011
- Constituency: Mwense

Personal details
- Born: David Mabumba; 23 April 1971 (age 55) Mwense, Zambia
- Party: Patriotic Front (before 2026); NRPUP (2026 to present)
- Children: 2

David Mabumba (born April 23, 1971) is a Zambian politician and the current Member of Parliament for Mwense.

== Biography ==
Mabumba completed postgraduate studies in management, graduating with a Master of Business Administration (MBA). He completed another postgraduate course in human resources with a Master of Science (M.Sc. Human Resource Management) and worked as a human resources manager. He was first elected to the National Assembly of Zambia as a candidate for the Patriotic Front (PF) in the 2011 election and on 11 August 2016, representing the Mwense constituency. After serving as Deputy Minister for Education, Vocational Training and Early Childhood from February 2015 to September 2016, he was appointed Minister of Energy in President Edgar Lungu's cabinet in September 2016.
