= Dag Hammarskjöld (constituency) =

National Assembly constituency in Zambia

Dag Hammarskjöld is a constituency of the National Assembly of Zambia. It was created in 2026. It covers Twapia, Kaniki and Dag Hammarskjöld in Ndola District.

== List of MPs ==
Election year	MP	Party
2026	Ezra Tembo	National Reconciliation Party for Unity and Prosperity
