= Mwenzo =

National Assembly constituency in Zambia

Mwenzo is a constituency of the National Assembly of Zambia. It was created in 2026 by splitting Nakonde constituency. It covers the western part of Nakonde District.

== List of MPs ==
Election year	MP	Party
Mwenzo
2026	Luka Simumba	National Reconciliation Party for Unity and Prosperity
