= Mwandi (constituency) =

Constituency of the National Assembly of Zambia

Mwandi is a constituency of the National Assembly of Zambia. It covers the town of Mwandi and surrounding areas in Mwandi District in Western Province.

== List of MPs ==
Election year	MP	Party
1991	Kakoma Sefulo	Movement for Multi-Party Democracy
1996	Monde Nangumbi	Movement for Multi-Party Democracy
2001	Siputa Kabanje	Movement for Multi-Party Democracy
2006	Michael Liwanga Kaingu	Movement for Multi-Party Democracy
2011	Michael Liwanga Kaingu	Movement for Multi-Party Democracy
2016	Sililo Mutaba	United Party for National Development
2021	Sibeso Sefulo	United Party for National Development
2026	Iris Kaingu	Independent
