= Chadiza (constituency) =

Constituency of the National Assembly of Zambia

Chadiza was a constituency of the National Assembly of Zambia. It covered the towns of Chadiza and Mlolo in Chadiza District of Eastern Province.

== List of MPs ==
| Election year | MP | Party |
|---|---|---|
| 1964 | Zongani Banda | United National Independence Party |
| 1968 | Zongani Banda | United National Independence Party |
| 1973 | Zongani Banda | United National Independence Party |
| 1978 | Gassian Phiri | United National Independence Party |
| 1983 | Shart Banda | United National Independence Party |
| 1988 | Shart Banda | United National Independence Party |
| 1991 | Shart Banda | United National Independence Party |
| 1992 (by-election) | Panji Kaunda | United National Independence Party |
| 1996 | Regina Phiri | Movement for Multi-Party Democracy |
| 2001 | Phillip Zulu | United National Independence Party |
| 2006 | Allan Mbewe | Movement for Multi-Party Democracy |
| 2011 | Allan Mbewe | Movement for Multi-Party Democracy |
| 2016 | Salatiel Tembo | Patriotic Front |
| 2021 | Jonathan Daka | Patriotic Front |
Seat abolished (split into Chadiza East and Chadiza West)
