= Maramba (constituency) =

National Assembly constituency in Zambia

Maramba is a constituency of the National Assembly of Zambia. It was created in 2026 by splitting Livingstone constituency. It covers the eastern part of Livingstone in Livingstone District, including the neighbourhoods of Maramba, Libuyu, Linda, Railways, Kasiya and Namatama.

== List of MPs ==
| Election year | MP | Party |
|---|---|---|
| 2026 | Yvonne Kabba | United Party for National Development |
