= Lumezi South =

National Assembly constituency in Zambia

Lumezi South is a constituency of the National Assembly of Zambia. It was created in 2026 when Lumezi constituency was split into two constituencies (Lumezi South and Lumezi North). It covers the southern part of Lumezi District.

== List of MPs ==
Election year	MP	Party
2026	Oliver Mwale	National Reconciliation Party for Unity and Prosperity
