= Kasama North =

National Assembly constituency in Zambia

Kasama North is a constituency of the National Assembly of Zambia. It was created in 2026 by splitting Kasama Central. It covers the northern part of Kasama District.

== List of MPs ==
Election year	MP	Party
2026	Justin Mutale	National Reconciliation Party for Unity and Prosperity
