= Kabwe Mwiinga =

Zambian businessman and politician

Kabwe Chrispin Mwiinga

Member of the National Assembly for Chikankata Constituency
- In office August 2016 – August 2021
- Preceded by: Munji Habeenzu
- Succeeded by: Jaqueline Sabao

Personal details
- Born: 12 April 1976 (age 50) Zambia
- Party: United Party for National Development
- Profession: Businessman

Kabwe Chrispin Mwiinga (born 12 April 1976) is a Zambian businessman and politician who served as the Member of Parliament for Chikankata from August 2016 to August 2021.

== Political career ==
Mwiinga was elected as MP for Chikankata in the 2016 general election on the ticket of the United Party for National Development.

He has served on various committees:

- Committee on Media, Information and Communication Technologies (Oct–Nov 2016)
- Committee on Youth, Sport and Child Matters (Nov 2016–Sep 2017)

== Controversies ==
As of August 2019, then‑Vice President Inonge Wina cautioned Mwiinga for raising tribal‑sounding questions in Parliament, asking why public universities were headed predominantly by individuals from one province.

== Personal life ==
Mwiinga was born on 12 April 1976 in Zambia. His profession prior to politics is listed as businessman. His educational qualification is listed as Diploma in Transport and Form V.
