= Lwitikila =

National Assembly constituency in Zambia

Lwitikila is a constituency of the National Assembly of Zambia. It was created in 2026 by splitting Kanchibiya. It covers the southern part of Kanchibiya District.

== List of MPs ==
Election year	MP	Party
2026	Kanungwe Kanyanyamina	National Reconciliation Party for Unity and Prosperity
