= Luongo (constituency) =

National Assembly constituency in Zambia

Luongo is a constituency of the National Assembly of Zambia. It was created in 2026 by splitting Pambashe constituency. It covers the eastern part of Kawambwa District.

== List of MPs ==
Election year	MP	Party
2026	Geoffrey Mulenga	National Reconciliation Party for Unity and Prosperity
