= Yvonne Kabba =

Zambian politician, businesswoman and philanthropist (born 1980)

Honorable Yvonne Kabba

Elected member of the National Assembly of Zambia
- Incumbent
- Assumed office August 2026
- President: Hakainde Hichilema
- Constituency: Maramba

Personal details
- Born: Yvonne Kabba; April 16, 1980 (age 46) Zambia
- Party: United Party for National Development

Yvonne Kabba (born April 16, 1980) is a Zambian politician, businesswoman and philanthropist. She currently represents Maramba constituency in the National Assembly of Zambia, having won the parliamentary seat in the 2026 general election.

== Political career ==
Kabba contested the Maramba Constituency seat in the general election held on 13 August 2026. She won the election with 15,262 votes, while her closest rival, independent candidate Namakau Muyangana, received 8,520 votes. Her election marked the beginning of parliamentary representation for Maramba Constituency, making her its first elected MP.

== Philanthropy ==
Kabba founded the Yvonne Kabba Foundation (YK Foundation) in 2024. The non-profit organisation focuses on supporting vulnerable and underserved communities, with stated priorities including women's empowerment, youth development and addressing drug and alcohol abuse among young people. The foundation also works with other stakeholders on initiatives relating to healthcare, education and social welfare.

=== Awards ===
Awards and nominations
Year	Award	Category	Recipient	Result
2026	Southern Province Creative Awards	Community Impact Award	Yvonne Kabba Foundation	Nominated
