= Pilila Jere =

Zambian politician

Member of the National Assembly for Lumezi
- In office August 2016 – August 2021
- Preceded by: Isaac Banda
- Succeeded by: Munir Zulu

Personal details
- Born: 27 June 1957 (age 68) Zambia
- Occupation: Politician

Pilila Mwanza Getrude Jere (born 27 July 1957) is a Zambian politician who was the Member of Parliament for Lumezi.
