= Chadiza West =

National Assembly constituency in Zambia

Chadiza West is a constituency of the National Assembly of Zambia. It was created in 2026 when Chadiza constituency was split into two constituencies (Chadiza East and Chadiza West). It covers the western part of Chadiza District, including Mlolo and Chadiza.

== List of MPs ==
Election year	MP	Party
2026	Obet Phiri	National Reconciliation Party for Unity and Prosperity
