= Dongwe (constituency) =

National Assembly constituency in Zambia

Dongwe is a constituency of the National Assembly of Zambia. It was created in 2026 by splitting Mufumbwe constituency. It covers the southern part of Mufumbwe District.

== List of MPs ==
Election year	MP	Party
2026	Davies Mbalau	United Party for National Development
