= Salatiel Tembo =

Zambian teacher and politician

Salatiel M. Tembo

Member of the National Assembly of Zambia for Chadiza
- In office August 2016 – August 2021
- Preceded by: Allan Mbewe
- Succeeded by: Jonathan Daka

Personal details
- Born: 29 September 1957 (age 68) Zambia
- Party: Patriotic Front
- Profession: Teacher

Salatiel M. Tembo (born 29 September 1957) is a Zambian teacher and politician who served as the Member of Parliament for Chadiza from 2016 to 2021, representing the Patriotic Front.

== Political career ==
Tembo was elected as Member of Parliament for Chadiza constituency in the 2016 Zambian general election under the Patriotic Front party.

In Parliament, he has served on various committees including the Committee on Education, Science and Technology from October 2016 to September 2017, and the Committee on Cabinet Affairs from October 2020 to May 2021.

== Constituency activities ==
In September 2017, Tembo organized a thanksgiving event in Mtaya, Khumba Ward, to show appreciation to his constituents for their support in the 2016 elections.

== Personal life and education ==
Tembo was born on 29 September 1957 and worked as a teacher before entering politics. He holds a Bachelor of Arts in Education, a Certificate in Adult Education, a Diploma in Adult Education, a Certificate in Primary Teaching, and completed Form V level studies.
