= Mpongwe =

Mpongwe may refer to:

- the Mpongwe people, an ethnic group in Gabon and their Mpongwe language
- Mpongwe, Copperbelt, seat of the Mpongwe District in Zambia
- Mpongwe (constituency), a constituency of the National Assembly of Zambia
