= Mpanda (constituency) =

National Assembly constituency in Zambia

Mpanda is a constituency of the National Assembly of Zambia. It was created in 2026 by splitting Malole constituency. It covers the northern part of Mungwi District.

== List of MPs ==
Election year	MP	Party
2026	Patrick Ndolesha	National Reconciliation Party for Unity and Prosperity
