= Zambezi Central =

National Assembly constituency in Zambia

Zambezi Central is a constituency of the National Assembly of Zambia. It was created in 2026. It covers the central part of Zambezi in Zambezi District.

== List of MPs ==
Election year	MP	Party
2026	Raphael Ngimbu	Independent
