= Chikankata (constituency) =

Constituency of the National Assembly of Zambia

Chikankata is a constituency of the National Assembly of Zambia. It covers Chikankata District in Southern Province.

== List of MPs ==
Election year	MP	Party
Chikankata
1968	Isaiah Nakalongo	Zambian African National Congress
1973	Joshua Lumina	United National Independence Party
1978	Joshua Lumina	United National Independence Party
1983	Lazarus Cheelo	United National Independence Party
1988	Joshua Lumina	United National Independence Party
1991	Joshua Lumina	Movement for Multi-Party Democracy
1994 (by-election)	Edben Mulonga	Movement for Multi-Party Democracy
1996	Misheck Chinda	Movement for Multi-Party Democracy
2001	Amos Nakalonga	United Party for National Development
2006	Munji Habeenzu	United Party for National Development
2011	Munji Habeenzu	United Party for National Development
2016	Kabwe Mwiinga	United Party for National Development
2021	Jaqueline Sabao	United Party for National Development
2026	Jaqueline Sabao	United Party for National Development
