= Iris Kaingu =

Zambian media personality, entrepreneur, and politician

- Iris in 2026

Member of the National Assembly of Zambia
- Incumbent
- Assumed office 7 September 2026
- Preceded by: Sibeso Sefulo
- Constituency: Mwandi

Personal details
- Party: Independent
- Parent: Michael Kaingu (father)
- Occupation: Politician; Entrepreneur; Media personality

Iris Kaingu is a Zambian media personality, entrepreneur, and politician. She first gained widespread public attention in 2012 following her conviction for making obscene cinematographic material. She later became involved in television and hospitality, including appearances on Zambian television and the establishment of Meno ä Ngweshi Resort. In 2022, she was the subject of the Zambezi Magic television special Life Through Iris.

Kaingu entered electoral politics in the 2021 Zambian general election, when she contested Mwandi Constituency as a candidate of the Patriotic Front and finished third. She later joined the United Party for National Development before contesting Mwandi as an independent candidate in the 2026 Zambian general election. She was declared the winner and subsequently took her seat in the National Assembly of Zambia. Her election was challenged by UPND candidate Sibeso Sefulo in an electoral petition.

Kaingu has also spoken publicly about cyberbullying, gender stereotypes and the treatment of women in public life, particularly in relation to the scrutiny she received following the 2012 case and during her political career.

== Political career ==
=== 2021 general election ===
Kaingu entered electoral politics in the 2021 Zambian general election, when the Patriotic Front adopted her as its candidate for Mwandi in Western Province. She said that she hoped her candidacy would encourage more young women to participate in leadership.

At the 2021 election, UPND candidate Sibeso Sefulo received 5,148 votes and was elected as Member of Parliament for Mwandi. Independent candidate Lisulo Siloba received 2,972 votes, while Kaingu, standing for the PF, received 2,831 votes. She finished third among the seven candidates.

=== Move to the UPND and 2026 general election ===
In 2025, Kaingu joined the United Party for National Development (UPND). In August that year, UPND spokesperson Cornelius Mweetwa said that the party welcomed her and that joining the party was her democratic right. In the 2026 Zambian general election, Kaingu contested Mwandi as an independent candidate. During the campaign, President Hakainde Hichilema criticised Kaingu's candidacy and urged voters in Mwandi not to support her. Non-governmental Organisations' Coordinating Council chairperson Beauty Katebe subsequently called on voters to support Kaingu. Kaingu was declared elected as the Member of Parliament for Mwandi and was sworn in as a member of the National Assembly of Zambia on 7 September 2026. She won by 6,595 votes aganist Sibeso Sefulo 6,110 for UPND candidate , a difference of 485 votes.

Sefulo subsequently challenged the result in the High Court. The petition included allegations of vote buying, interference with the counting process and irregularities in the conduct of the election.
