= Chavuma (constituency) =

Zambian National Assembly constituency

Chavuma is a constituency of the National Assembly of Zambia. It covers 13 wards, including the town of Chavuma and the surrounding rural area in Chavuma District of North-Western Province.

== List of MPs ==
Election year	MP	Party
1991	Benard Fumbelo	United National Independence Party
1996	Jerry Muloji	Movement for Multi-Party Democracy
2001	Sakachamba Chitanga	United Party for National Development
2006	Kenneth Konga	Movement for Multi-Party Democracy
2011	Kenneth Konga	Movement for Multi-Party Democracy
2016	Victor Lumayi	United Party for National Development
2021	Victor Lumayi	United Party for National Development
2026	Victor Lumayi	United Party for National Development
