= Magoye (constituency) =

Constituency of the National Assembly of Zambia

Magoye was a constituency of the National Assembly of Zambia. It covered the village of Magoye and surrounding areas in Mazabuka District of Southern Province.

== List of MPs ==
Election year	MP	Party
Magoye
1964	Amos Walubita	Zambian African National Congress
1968	Kayumba Hamwende	Zambian African National Congress
Monze East
1968	Kayumba Hamwende	Zambian African National Congress
1971 (by-election)	Isaac Chulu	Zambian African National Congress
Magoye
1973	Judah Hachwa	United National Independence Party
1978	Fitzpatrick Chuula	United National Independence Party
Seat abolished
1991	Bates Namuyamba	Movement for Multi-Party Democracy
1996	Vincent Malambo	Movement for Multi-Party Democracy
2001	Andrew Haakaloba	United Party for National Development
2006	Bennie Mweemba	United Party for National Development
2011 (by-election)	Oliver Mulomba	United Party for National Development
2011	Oliver Mulomba	United Party for National Development
2016	Emmerson Machila	United Party for National Development
2021	Mweemba Malambo	United Party for National Development
Seat abolished (split into Magoye West and Magoye East)
