= Sesheke (constituency) =

Constituency of the National Assembly of Zambia

Sesheke was a constituency of the National Assembly of Zambia. It covered Sesheke and surrounding towns in Sesheke District of Western Province.

== List of MPs ==
Election year	MP	Party
Sesheke
1964	Durton Konoso	United National Independence Party
1968	Sefulo Kakoma	United National Independence Party
1973	Josaphat Siyomunji	United National Independence Party
1978	Yusiku Mukelabai	United National Independence Party
1983	Lawrence Sinyani	United National Independence Party
1988	Inyambo Yeta	United National Independence Party
1991	Richard Nganga	Movement for Multi-Party Democracy
1996	Mwiya Nawa	Agenda for Zambia
2000 (by-election)	George Mushiba	United Party for National Development
2001	Nakatindi Wina	United Party for National Development
2006	Adonis Mufalali	Movement for Multi-Party Democracy
2011	Sianga Siyauya	United Party for National Development
2016	Frank Kufakwandi	United Party for National Development
2019 (by-election)	Romeo Kang'ombe	United Party for National Development
2021	Romeo Kang'ombe	United Party for National Development
Seat abolished (split into Sesheke West and Sesheke East)
