= Chambishi (constituency) =

National Assembly constituency in Zambia

Chambishi is a constituency of the National Assembly of Zambia. It was created in 2026 by splitting Kalulushi constituency. It covers the northern and western part of Kalulushi District, including the towns of Chambishi and Chati.

== List of MPs ==
Election year	MP	Party
Chambishi
2026	Rashida Mulenga	United Party for National Development
