= Kalungwishi =

National Assembly constituency in Zambia

Kalungwishi is a constituency of the National Assembly of Zambia. It was created in 2026 by splitting Chiengi constituency. It covers the southern part of Chiengi District.

== List of MPs ==
Election year	MP	Party
2026	Prudence Mulenga	National Reconciliation Party for Unity and Prosperity
