= Mporokoso (constituency) =

Constituency of the National Assembly of Zambia

Mporokoso is a constituency of the National Assembly of Zambia. It covers the towns of Mporokoso and Mukunsa in Mporokoso District of Northern Province.

== List of MPs ==
Election year	MP	Party
1964	Mulenga Chapoloko	United National Independence Party
Seat abolished (split into Mporokoso North and Mporokoso South)
1973	Wila Mung'omba	United National Independence Party
1978	Unia Mwila	United National Independence Party
1983	Unia Mwila	United National Independence Party
1988	Kasonde Mwamba	United National Independence Party
1991	Ackim Nkole	Movement for Multi-Party Democracy
1996	Ackim Nkole	Movement for Multi-Party Democracy
2001	Chiti Sampa	Movement for Multi-Party Democracy
2006	Maynard Misapa	Movement for Multi-Party Democracy
2011 (by-election)	Maynard Misapa	Patriotic Front
2011	Nevelyn Willombe	Patriotic Front
2016	Brian Mundubile	Patriotic Front
2021	Brian Mundubile	Patriotic Front
2026	Wedden Chileshe	United Party for National Development
