= Mpongwe West =

National Assembly constituency in Zambia

Mpongwe West is a constituency of the National Assembly of Zambia. It was created in 2026 when Mpongwe constituency was split into two constituencies (Mpongwe East and Mpongwe West). It covers the western part of Mpongwe District, including Mpongwe, Machiya and Luswishi.

== List of MPs ==
Election year	MP	Party
2026	Emmanuel Kasambo	United Party for National Development
