= Mongu East =

National Assembly constituency in Zambia

Mongu East is a constituency of the National Assembly of Zambia. It was created in 2026 by splitting Mongu Central. It covers the eastern part of Mongu in Mongu District.

== List of MPs ==
Election year	MP	Party
2026	Christopher Mubita Nawa	United Party for National Development
