= Sesheke East =

National Assembly constituency in Zambia

Sesheke East is a constituency of the National Assembly of Zambia. It was created in 2026 when Sesheke constituency was split into two constituencies (Sesheke West and Sesheke East). It covers the eastern part of Sesheke District, including the town of Sesheke.

== List of MPs ==
Election year	MP	Party
2026	Romeo Kang'ombe	United Party for National Development
