= Nshamba Muzungu =

Zambian politician, lawyer and former journalist (born 1982)

Honorable Nshamba Muzungu

Second Deputy Speaker of the National Assembly of Zambia
- Incumbent
- Assumed office 2 October 2026
- Preceded by: Moses Moyo

Member of the National Assembly of Zambia
- Incumbent
- Assumed office August 2026
- Preceded by: Elliot Kamondo
- Constituency: Mufumbwe

Personal details
- Born: March 18, 1982 (age 44)
- Party: Independent

Nshamba Mulondwe Muzungu (born 18 March 1982) is a Zambian politician, lawyer and former journalist who represents Mufumbwe constituency as an independent Member of Parliament. He also serves as the second Deputy Speaker of the National Assembly.

== Political career ==
Muzungu was elected to Parliament in the 2026 general election, winning the Mufumbwe parliamentary seat as an independent candidate. He succeeded Elliot Kamondo as Mufumbwe's Member of Parliament.

On October 2, 2026, Muzungu was elected Second Deputy Speaker of the National Assembly, succeeding Moses Moyo, during the first sitting of the Fourteenth National Assembly.
