= Luwingu Central =

National Assembly constituency in Zambia

Luwingu Central is a constituency of the National Assembly of Zambia. It was created in 2026. It covers the western part of Luwingu District.

== List of MPs ==
Election year	MP	Party
2026	Patrick Mucheleka	United Party for National Development
