= Saise =

National Assembly constituency in Zambia

Saise is a constituency of the National Assembly of Zambia. It was created in 2026. It covers the eastern and southern part of Mbala District.

== List of MPs ==
| Election year | MP | Party |
|---|---|---|
| 2026 | Remmy Sikazwe | United Party for National Development |
