= Magoye West =

National Assembly constituency in Zambia

Magoye West is a constituency of the National Assembly of Zambia. It was created in 2026 by splitting Magoye constituency into two constituencies (Magoye West and Magoye East). It covers the western part of Mazabuka District.

== List of MPs ==
Election year	MP	Party
Magoye West
2026	Nachombe Kabunda	United Party for National Development
