= Nkombwa =

National Assembly constituency in Zambia

Nkombwa is a constituency of the National Assembly of Zambia. It was created in 2026 by splitting Isoka constituency. It covers the eastern part of Isoka District.

== List of MPs ==
Election year	MP	Party
2026	Jairo Simbeye	United Party for National Development
