= Chadiza East =

National Assembly constituency in Zambia

Chadiza East is a constituency of the National Assembly of Zambia. It was created in 2026 when Chadiza constituency was split into two constituencies (Chadiza East and Chadiza West). It covers the eastern part of Chadiza District.

== List of MPs ==
Election year	MP	Party
2026	Yamikani Phiri	United Party for National Development
