= Kalomo South =

National Assembly constituency in Zambia

Kalomo South is a constituency of the National Assembly of Zambia. It was created in 2026 by splitting Kalomo Central. It covers the southern part of Kalomo District.

== List of MPs ==
Election year	MP	Party
Kalomo South
2026	Edgar Siakachoma	United Party for National Development
