= Mpulungu South =

National Assembly constituency in Zambia

Mpulungu South is a constituency of the National Assembly of Zambia. It was created in 2026. It covers the southern part of Mpulungu District.

== List of MPs ==
Election year	MP	Party
2026	Justin Mutale	National Reconciliation Party for Unity and Prosperity
