= Choma South =

National Assembly constituency in Zambia

Choma South is a constituency of the National Assembly of Zambia. It was created in 2026 by splitting Choma Central. It covers the southern part of Choma District, including Masuku.

== List of MPs ==
Election year	MP	Party
Choma South
2026	Trevor Mwiinde	United Party for National Development
