= Sesheke West =

National Assembly constituency in Zambia

Sesheke West is a constituency of the National Assembly of Zambia. It was created in 2026 when Sesheke constituency was split into two constituencies (Sesheke West and Sesheke East). It covers the western part of Sesheke District.

== List of MPs ==
Election year	MP	Party
Sesheke West
2026	Frederick Misebezi	United Party for National Development
