= Victor Lumayi =

Zambian politician

Member of the National Assembly for Chavuma
- Incumbent
- Assumed office 2016
- Preceded by: Kenneth Konga

Personal details
- Born: 28 March 1978 (age 48) Zambia
- Party: United Party for National Development
- Profession: Politician

Victor Lumayi (born 28 March 1978) is a Zambian politician serving as the Member of Parliament for Chavuma since 2016. He is a member of the United Party for National Development (UPND).

== Political career ==
Lumayi stood as the United Party for National Development candidate in Chavuma constituency at the 2016 general election and was elected. At the 2021 general election, he was re-elected. At the 2026 general election, he was re-elected.

He has advocated for the Zambian Correctional Service to maintain prisons properly, emphasizing that prisons are also meant for the Zambian citizens.

== See also ==
- List of members of the National Assembly of Zambia (2021–2026)
