= Lumezi North =

National Assembly constituency in Zambia

Lumezi North is a constituency of the National Assembly of Zambia. It was created in 2026 when Lumezi constituency was split into two constituencies (Lumezi South and Lumezi North). It covers the northern part of Lumezi District, including the town of Lumezi.

== List of MPs ==
Election year	MP	Party
2026	Anderson Banda	United Party for National Development
