= Mpongwe East =

National Assembly constituency in Zambia

Mpongwe East is a constituency of the National Assembly of Zambia. It was created in 2026 when Mpongwe constituency was split into two constituencies (Mpongwe East and Mpongwe West). It covers the eastern part of Mpongwe District.

== List of MPs ==
Election year	MP	Party
2026	Emmanuel Masanga	United Party for National Development
