= Ezra Tembo =

Zambian politician and businessman (born 1978)

Honorable Ezra Tembo

Elected Member of Parliament for Dag Hammarskjöld
- Incumbent
- Assumed office August 2026
- President: Hakainde Hichilema

President of the National Reconciliation Party for Unity and Prosperity
- Incumbent
- Assumed office 2025

Personal details
- Born: 25 August 1978 (age 48)
- Party: National Reconciliation Party for Unity and Prosperity

Ezra Tembo (born 25 August 1978) is a Zambian politician who serves as president of the National Reconciliation Party for Unity and Prosperity (NRPUP) and as a Member of Parliament for Dag Hammarskjöld constituency.

== Political career ==
Tembo contested the 2026 general election as the National Reconciliation Party for Unity and Prosperity (NRPUP) candidate for Dag Hammarskjöld constituency. He won the seat with 5,320 votes, while his closest rival, United Party for National Development (UPND) candidate Ernest Lufunda, received 5,294 votes, giving Tembo a winning margin of 26 votes. Following the election, Lufunda petitioned the result but later withdrew his petition, citing his desire to prioritise constituency development. Although Lufunda maintained that there had been irregularities, his withdrawal allowed the constituency to move forward without continuing the legal challenge.

As president of NRPUP, Tembo led the party through the 2026 general elections. The party participated in the election with Brian Mundubile as its presidential candidate under the Tonse Alliance. Following the results, Mundubile finished second to incumbent president Hakainde Hichilema.

On 19 August 2026, Tembo announced that NRPUP accepted the presidential election results declared by the Electoral Commission of Zambia and congratulated Hichilema and the UPND on their victory. He also commended Mundubile and his running mate, Makebi Zulu, for their campaign. Tembo said the party intended to hold the government accountable through Parliament and other democratic processes.

In September 2026, NRPUP announced that Tembo had been selected as Leader of the Opposition in the National Assembly. The party's secretary-general, Nonde Mubanga, said the decision was made at a meeting of 34 NRPUP members of Parliament on 3 September and that Tembo's nomination had been submitted to the National Assembly. The parliament speaker confirmed him as Leader of the Opposition the following month.
