= Kundabwika =

National Assembly constituency in Zambia

Kundabwika is a constituency of the National Assembly of Zambia. It was created in 2026 by splitting Kaputa constituency. It covers the southern part of Kaputa District.

== List of MPs ==
Election year	MP	Party
2026	Maxas Ng'onga	United Party for National Development
