= Mpongwe (constituency) =

Zambian National Assembly constituency

Mpongwe was a constituency of the National Assembly of Zambia. It encompassed the town of Mpongwe and a large rural area within Mpongwe District in the Copperbelt Province.

== List of MPs ==
Election year	MP	Party
1991	Dawson Lupunga	Movement for Multi-Party Democracy
1996	Dawson Lupunga	Movement for Multi-Party Democracy
2001	Davison Mulela	Movement for Multi-Party Democracy
2006	Gabriel Namulambe	Movement for Multi-Party Democracy
2011	Gabriel Namulambe	Movement for Multi-Party Democracy
2013 (by-election)	Gabriel Namulambe	Patriotic Front
2016	Rasfold Bulaya	United Party for National Development
2021	Gregory Ngowani	United Party for National Development
Seat abolished (split into Mpongwe West and Mpongwe East)
