= Nkundalila =

National Assembly constituency in Zambia

Nkundalila is a constituency of the National Assembly of Zambia. It was created in 2026 by splitting Muchinga constituency. It covers the eastern part of Serenje District.

== List of MPs ==
Election year	MP	Party
2026	Emmanuel Banda	United Party for National Development
