= Mufumbwe (constituency) =

Constituency of the National Assembly of Zambia

Mufumbwe is a constituency of the National Assembly of Zambia. It covers the towns of Chizela, Kalengwa, Kangalesha and Mufumbwe in Mufumbwe District of North-Western Province.

== List of MPs ==
Election year	MP	Party
1991	Ngalande Matiya	Movement for Multi-Party Democracy
1996	Bert Mushala	Independent
2001	Bert Mushala	Movement for Multi-Party Democracy
2006	Meshack Bonshe	Movement for Multi-Party Democracy
2010 (by-election)	Elliot Kamondo	United Party for National Development
2011	Steven Masumba	Movement for Multi-Party Democracy
2012 (by-election)	Steven Masumba	Patriotic Front
2016	Elliot Kamondo	United Party for National Development
2021	Elliot Kamondo	United Party for National Development
2026	Nshamba Muzungu	Independent
