= Kalabo South =

National Assembly constituency in Zambia

Kalabo South is a constituency of the National Assembly of Zambia. It was created in 2026 by splitting Kalabo Central. It covers the southern part of Kalabo District.

== List of MPs ==
Election year	MP	Party
2026	Chinga Miyutu	United Party for National Development
