= Magoye East =

National Assembly constituency in Zambia

Magoye East is a constituency of the National Assembly of Zambia. It was created in 2026 by splitting Magoye constituency into two constituencies (Magoye West and Magoye East). It covers the south-eastern part of Mazabuka District.

== List of MPs ==
| Election year | MP | Party |
Magoye East
| 2026 | Malambo Mweemba | United Party for National Development |
