= Mufwashi =

National Assembly constituency in Zambia

Mufwashi is a constituency of the National Assembly of Zambia. It was created in 2026 by splitting Kasempa constituency. It covers the northern and eastern part of Kasempa District.

== List of MPs ==
Election year	MP	Party
2026	Brian Kakonkanya	United Party for National Development
