= Lumezi (constituency) =

Constituency of the National Assembly of Zambia

Lumezi was a constituency of the National Assembly of Zambia. It covered Chidonga, Chikuni, Chitungulu, Chikwinda, Chombelao, Kalatika, Kalikwe, Kawinga, Lumezi, Mukuku and Mwimba in Lumezi District of Eastern Province.

== List of MPs ==
Election year	MP	Party
1973	James Nyirongo	United National Independence Party
1978	Haswell Mwale	United National Independence Party
1983	Mjose Mwale	United National Independence Party
1988	Leticia Mwanza	United National Independence Party
1991	Leticia Mwanza	United National Independence Party
1996	Francis Kamanga	Movement for Multi-Party Democracy
2001	Dickson Zulu	United National Independence Party
2006	Isaac Banda	Movement for Multi-Party Democracy
2011	Isaac Banda	Movement for Multi-Party Democracy
2016	Pilila Jere	Independent
2021	Munir Zulu	Independent
2025 (by-election)	Lufeyo Ngoma	United Party for National Development
Seat abolished (split into Lumezi North and Lumezi South)
