= Brian Mundubile =

Zambian politician (born 1971)

Hon. Brian Mundubile

Leader of the Opposition
- In office 2021–2023
- Succeeded by: Robert Chabinga

Member of the National Assembly for Mporokoso
- In office August 2016 – 15 May 2026
- Preceded by: Nevelyn Willombe
- Succeeded by: TBD

Personal details
- Born: Brian Muntayalwa Mundubile; January 5, 1971 (age 55) Mporokoso, Zambia
- Party: NRPUP (2026–present)
- Other political affiliations: Patriotic Front (2016–2026)
- Profession: Accountant, lawyer, politician

Brian Muntayalwa Mundubile (born 5 January 1971) is a Zambian politician who served as the Member of the National Assembly for Mporokoso from 2016 to 2026. He is a member of the National Reconciliation Party for Unity and Prosperity.

== Political career ==
Mundubile stood as the Patriotic Front MP candidate in Mporokoso constituency at the August 2016 general election and was elected. President Edgar Lungu then appointed him as the Provincial minister for Northern Province the following month. In July 2019, he was transferred to being the government chief whip.

At the August 2021 general election, he stood again as the Patriotic Front MP candidate in Mporokoso and was re-elected. After the Patriotic Front finished second to the United Party for National Development in the presidential election, Mundubile was appointed as the Leader of the Opposition. In November 2023, the Patriotic Front president removed him as the leader of the opposition.

In late 2022, Mundubile was one of the members who applied to be a candidate in a proposed convention in which the successor of Edgar Lungu (who decided to retire) for the Patriotic Front presidency would be chosen. Lungu was given back the title of PF president in October 2023, putting a halt to any plans for a convention.

=== Tonse Alliance ===
In November 2024, a faction of the Patriotic Front (PF) joined the Tonse Alliance, with Edgar Lungu (the PF faction president) appointed as the chairperson and Dan Pule (the Christian Democratic Party president) as the vice chairperson. Lungu travelled to South Africa in early 2025 for medical treatment and decided that Given Lubinda should be the chairperson in the interim. On 5 June 2025, Lungu died and disagreements appeared within the alliance over who should be the acting chairperson between Pule (who was the vice chairperson) and Lubinda (who Lungu decided should be the caretaker), causing the alliance to have two factions.

In early 2026, the faction of the Tonse Alliance led by Pule decided that a convention needs to take place to choose the alliance's presidential candidate (to replace Lungu) in preparation for the 2026 general election to happen in August that year. Dan Pule (the Christian Democratic Party president) and Brian Mundubile (a Patriotic Front member) are the two members of the alliance that applied for the position. On 28 January 2026, a convention took place and Mundubile was chosen as the alliance's 2026 presidential candidate to challenge incumbent President Hakainde Hichilema and it was maintained that the Forum for Democracy and Development (FDD) will be the party used for candidacy at the election.

On 7 January 2026, Pule made an announcement stating that the alliance members decided to expel the Patriotic Front (PF) from the alliance. Due to Mundubile choosing to associate with the Pule faction of the alliance and going ahead to participate in the convention that took place on 28 January 2026 despite the internal disagreements, it was decided that Mundubile is no-longer a member of the Patriotic Front. So, Mundubile began campaigning to participate in the August 2026 presidential election as the FDD candidate.

On 16 May 2026, it was reported that one of the FDD members took the party to court over the convention and agreement that placed Brian Mundubile as the presidential candidate of the party and Mundubile agreed to use a different party from within the Tonse Alliance at the August 2026 general election, namely the National Reconciliation Party for Unity and Prosperity (NRPUP). The PF Pamodzi Alliance led by Makebi Zulu then agreed to an alliance partnership with the Tonse Alliance led by Brian Mundubile for unity in the 2026 general election and an agreement was made for Mundubile to be the presidential candidate of the alliance and Zulu to stand as his running mate (vice president) in the alliance at the election to happen in August that year. At the election in August 2026, Brian Mundubile had finished second to Hakainde Hichilema in the presidential election.

On 14 August 2026, a day after the election, Mundubile and 10 others were arrested in Lusaka on suspicion of plotting an insurrection. Mundubile denied the accusations and said he was the subject of an assassination attempt. On 30 August 2026, he was charged with treason, according to his lawyer Milner Katolo.
