= Zambia Must Prosper =

- Abbreviation: ZMP
- Leader: Kelvin Fube Bwalya
- Founded: 17 March 2022
- Colours: Green; Yellow
- National Assembly: 1 / 266

Website
- zambiamustprosper.org (archived)

Zambia Must Prosper (ZMP) is a political party in Zambia.

== History ==
Kelvin Fube Bwalya started the Zambia Shall Prosper Movement in 2021 after leaving the Patriotic Front. After the movement's brief spell as a member of the UPND Alliance, it was registered as a political party in March 2022 and named Zambia Must Prosper (ZMP). In 2024, the party launched its manifesto.

In January 2025, the party joined the Tonse Alliance. The ZMP party led by Kelvin Fube Bwalya expressed interest in standing for the alliance presidency while it also expressed issues over the alliance membership and leadership after the supposed expulsion of the Patriotic Front from the alliance. They eventually exited from the Tonse Alliance due to disagreements.

The ZMP party participated in the 2026 general election, where the party won the Mafinga North seat in the National Assembly while party president Kelvin Fube Bwalya finished fourth in a field of 13 presidential candidates with 0.35% of the vote.

== Electoral history ==
=== Presidential elections ===
Election	Party candidate	Votes	%	Result
2026	Kelvin Fube Bwalya	17,078	0.35	Lost ✗

=== National Assembly elections ===
Election	Votes	%	Seats	+/–	Position	Outcome
2026	TBA	TBA	1 / 167	▲1	▲5th	Opposition

== See also ==
- List of political parties in Zambia
