= Resolute Party =

- Abbreviation: RP
- Leader: Martin Phiri
- Founded: December 2025
- Ideology: Socialism
- Political position: Left-wing
- Colours: Green; Orange
- National Assembly: 5 / 266

The Resolute Party (RP) is a political party in Zambia. Its president and founder is Martin Madaliso Phiri.

== History ==
The Resolute Party (RP) was founded in December 2025. In January 2026, they joined the Tonse Alliance. They were speculated to place a candidate in the 2026 Chawama by-election but didn't do so. On 11 March 2026, the Patriotic Front formed the PF Pamodzi Alliance and officially decided to step away from the Tonse Alliance, with the Resolute Party being one of the members in the new alliance.

In May 2026, ahead of the 2026 general election, due to internal factional issues within the Patriotic Front (for which Miles Sampa was recognized as the president), the PF Pamodzi Alliance led by Makebi Zulu needed a different political party to use for candidacy at the election and the Resolute Party was chosen.

During the same month, the PF Pamodzi Alliance had agreed to an alliance partnership with the Tonse Alliance (which the RP was previously part of) led by Brian Mundubile for unity in the 2026 general election. The agreement was for Mundubile of the National Reconciliation Party for Unity and Prosperity (NRPUP) in the Tonse Alliance to be the presidential candidate of the alliance and Zulu of the Resolute Party in the Pamodzi Alliance to stand as his running mate (vice president) in the alliance at the election to happen in August that year and the merger of the two alliances would be called the Tonse-Pamodzi Alliance with the NRPUP being the primary party used in the presidential campaign instead of the RP. So, Zulu did not stand for presidency and instead stood for vice presidency.

However, at the time, the RP and the NRPUP had both adopted candidates for parliament and local government in some districts, which meant that the two parties had candidates that were in competition in those districts while they did not field candidates in 72 of the 226 constituencies in Zambia. Party president Martin Phiri expressed displeasure in the Tonse-Pamodzi Alliance on 18 July 2026 and proceeded to publicly endorse Hakainde Hichilema and the United Party for National Development to win the 2026 general election. Some party members disagreed with the decision that was made here and it was reported in early August 2026 that the party secretary general, Alex Katepu, and Phiri had sent notices of expulsion to one another within a period of 48 hours.

At the 2026 general election on 13 August 2026, the Resolute Party won the parliamentary vote in 5 constituencies while Brian Mundubile and Makebi Zulu of the Tonse-Pamodzi Alliance had finished second to Hichilema. Party president Martin Phiri accepted the outcome of the election while Brian Mundubile and Makebi Zulu were unsatisfied with the election results.

== Policies ==
The party advocates for public control of natural resources.

== See also ==
- List of political parties in Zambia
