= Citizens First =

- Abbreviation: CF
- Leader: Harry Kalaba
- Founded: 2022
- Split from: Democratic Party
- Colours: Orange; Green
- National Assembly: 2 / 266

Website
- citizens-firstzm.org harry-kalaba.com

Citizens First (CF) is a political party in Zambia.

== History ==
In 2022, the party was founded by Harry Kalaba. He departed from the Democratic Party. In 2024, the party's manifesto was released.

The party came third in the 2026 Chawama by-election. In the 2026 Zambian general election, the party won seats in the National Assembly.

== Electoral history ==
=== Presidential elections ===
| Election | Party candidate | Votes | % | Result |
|---|---|---|---|---|
| 2026 | Harry Kalaba | TBA | TBA | TBA |

=== National Assembly elections ===
| Election | Votes | % | Seats | +/– | Position | Outcome |
|---|---|---|---|---|---|---|
| 2026 | TBA | TBA | 2 / 167 | ▲2 | ▲4th | TBA |

== See also ==
- List of political parties in Zambia
