= Socialist Party (Zambia) =

- Abbreviation: SP
- Leader: Fred M'membe
- Founded: March 2018
- Split from: Rainbow Party
- Ideology: Socialism; Marxism–Leninism
- Political position: Left-wing to far-left
- International affiliation: International Peoples' Assembly
- Colours: Red
- Slogan: Justice Equity Peace
- National Assembly: 0 / 156

Website
- socialistpartyzambia.com

The Socialist Party is an opposition party in Zambia. It describes itself as socialist and Marxist–Leninist.

The party was launched in March 2018 in a split from Rainbow Party, another Zambian socialist party.

It was founded by the journalist Fred M'membe, who was the party's candidate for president in the 2021 Zambian general election, and in the 2026 Zambian general election.

While the formerly ruling Patriotic Front describes itself as socialist, in its current form it is generally seen as center-left. The Socialist Party's 2021 election manifesto promised a focus on universal education and health care, as well as cooperative farming.

== Electoral history ==
=== Presidential elections ===
Election	Party candidate	Votes	%	Result
2021	Fred M'membe	16,644	0.34%	Lost ✗

=== National Assembly elections ===
Election	Votes	%	Seats	+/–	Position	Outcome
2021	61,325	1.27%	0 / 167	Steady	▲3rd	Extra-parliamentary
