= Makebi Zulu =

Zambian lawyer and politician

Member of the National Assembly of Zambia
- In office August 2016 – August 2021
- Constituency: Malambo

Personal details
- Born: 25 December 1981 (age 44)
- Party: Resolute Party; Patriotic Front
- Education: University of Zambia
- Profession: Lawyer

Makebi Zulu (born 25 December 1981) is a Zambian lawyer and politician who served as the Member of Parliament for Malambo Constituency from 2016 to 2021, during which he served as the Provincial Minister for Eastern Province. He was a member of the Patriotic Front and his faction was affiliated with the Resolute Party at the 2026 Zambian general election.

== Education ==
He studied law at the University of Zambia, completing in 2005.

== Legal career ==
Makebi Zulu is a practicing lawyer and founding partner at Makebi Zulu Advocates, a Lusaka-based law firm known for its involvement in legal matters. He has represented clients in both civil and criminal cases and is known for his work in constitutional law and electoral law.

== Political career ==
Zulu was elected to the National Assembly of Zambia in the August 2016 general election to represent Malambo constituency under the Patriotic Front. The following month, he was appointed as Eastern Province Minister, where he oversaw development initiatives and government projects in the region.

He has also been vocal in parliamentary debates, especially on constitutional amendments and governance issues. Zulu played a visible role in public legal discussions around Bill 10, a constitutional amendment bill proposed in 2019 that sparked national debate.

Zulu decided to stand again in Malambo constituency at the 2021 general election and finished second to Peter Phiri of the United Party for National Development. He then became the lawyer and spokesperson for former President Edgar Lungu and his family. He was Lungu's lawyer in the case of whether Lungu is eligible to stand for presidency at the next election in 2026 as well as in the case of where to bury Lungu after he died in June 2025.

In October 2025, Zulu announced his intention to contest for the presidency of the Patriotic Front (PF). On 11 March 2026, the PF Pamodzi Alliance was formed by a faction of the PF where Given Lubinda was the acting president, with the party resigning from the Tonse Alliance. On 15 March 2026, Lubinda announced that after many delays, his PF faction would host a convention to choose their new leader within four days. The convention took place virtually on 21 March 2026 and the delegates that were present elected Makebi Zulu to be the president of the party faction with 49.2% of the vote, with Chitalu Chilufya winning 34.1% of the vote.

Due to Miles Sampa being recognized as the legal PF party president at the time, the PF faction led by Makebi Zulu opted to use a different party from among the membership of the PF Pamodzi Alliance for candidacy at the 2026 general election and the Resolute Party was chosen as the special purpose vehicle in early May 2026 after a meeting by the party leaders within the alliance. During the same month, the PF Pamodzi Alliance had agreed to an alliance partnership with the Tonse Alliance (which the PF was previously part of) led by Brian Mundubile for unity in the 2026 general election and an agreement was made for Mundubile to be the presidential candidate of the alliance and Zulu to stand as his running mate (vice president) in the alliance at the election to happen in August that year. Mundubile and Zulu finished second to the incumbent president and vice president, Hakainde Hichilema and Mutale Nalumango, at the August 2026 election.

On 14 August 2026, a day after the election, Mundubile, Zulu and 9 others were arrested in Lusaka on suspicion of plotting an insurrection. The claims were denied by Mundubile and Zulu. On 30 August 2026, Mundubile and Zulu among others were charged with treason, according to Mundubile's lawyer Milner Katolo.
