= Nelly Mutti =

Zambian lawyer and politician (born 1956)

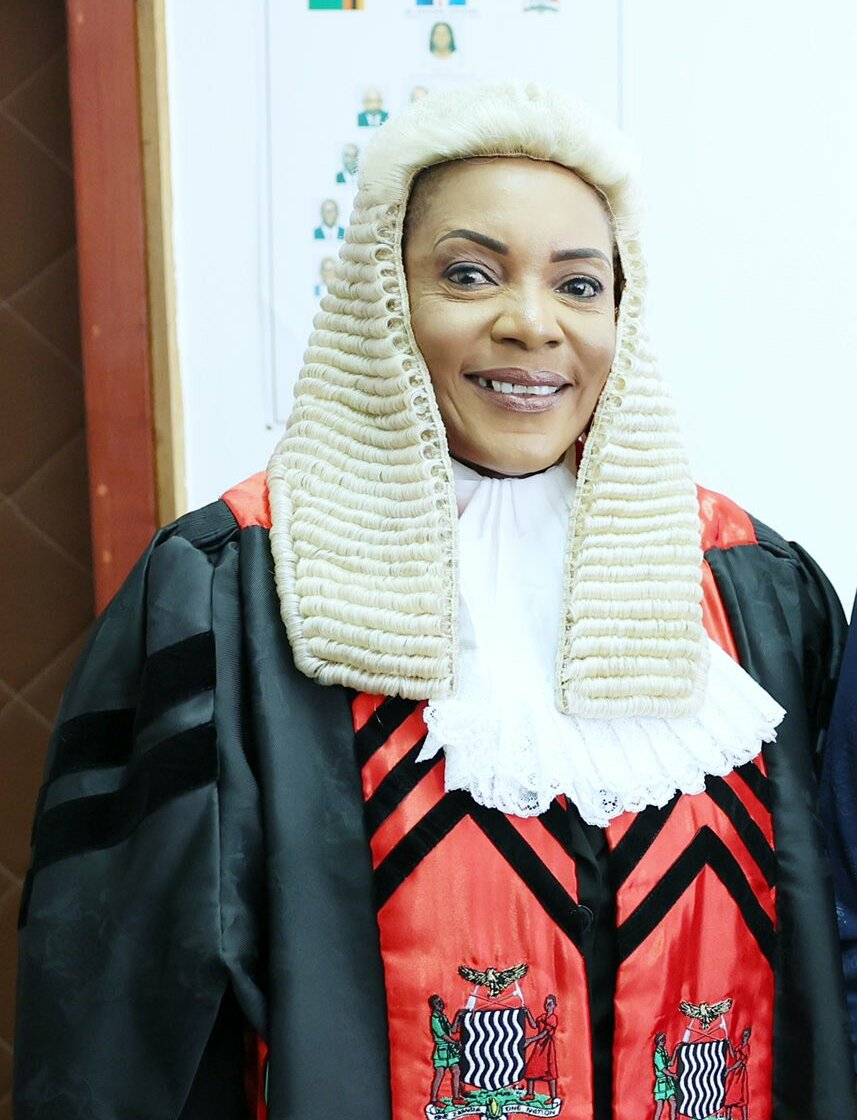
- Mutti in 2022

7th Speaker of the National Assembly of Zambia
- Incumbent
- Assumed office 3 September 2021
- Preceded by: Patrick Matibini

Personal details
- Born: 30 August 1956 (age 70)
- Education: University of Zambia

Nelly Butete Kashumba Mutti (born 30 August 1956) is a Zambian lawyer and politician who has been the 7th Speaker of the National Assembly of Zambia since 2021, and is the first woman to hold that role. She was elected vice president of the Inter-Parliamentary Union in 2025.

== Early life and education ==
Nelly Butete Kashumba Mutti was born on 30 August 1956. She graduated with a Bachelor of Laws degree from the University of Zambia. She worked as a lawyer in Lusaka.

Mutti also holds a Certificate in International Law and Development from the Hague Academy of International Law and a certificate in Negotiating Petroleum Exploration Agreements from the Institute of International Law in Italy. She is a certified arbitrator and mediator and a member of the Chartered Institute of Arbitrators.

== Career ==
=== Appointments ===
Mutti was the chair of the Anti-Corruption Commission from 2002 to 2006, and a commissioner on the Constitution Review Commission of Zambia from 2003 to 2005. In 2025, Mutti was elected vice president of the Inter-Parliamentary Union.

=== Speaker ===
Mutti was elected to succeed Patrick Matibini as Speaker on 3 September 2021, and was the first woman to hold the position. During Mutti's tenure in the house she served on the House Business and Standing Orders committees.

Mutti suspended Jean Chisenga from the house for seven days due to disorderly conduct as Chisenga was debating while seated. Mutotwe Kafwaya was suspended by Mutti for seven days in 2024, after he accused her of sharing a ruling about the vacation of a house seat. She declined to declare four seats held by Patriotic Front members Elias Daka, Andrew Lubusha, Davison Mung'andu, and Jonathan Daka as it was not within her jurisdiction.

Mutti was critical of house members for their lateness to sessions after a quorum could not be reached in 2025. She prohibited wearing Ngoni headbands in the house.

== Personal life ==
Mutti is a widow.

== Works cited ==
=== News ===
- "Prominent Lusaka Lawyer Nelly Mutti elected as the first ever woman Speaker of the National Assembly". Lusaka Times. 3 September 2021. Archived from the original on 29 June 2025.
- "Zambia elects first woman as parliament speaker". Al Jazeera English. 3 September 2021. Archived from the original on 29 June 2025.
- Daka, Precious (7 March 2025). "Speaker disappointed with MPs' habit of late coming". Zambia: News Diggers. Archived from the original on 29 June 2025.
- Daka, Precious (15 November 2024). "Speaker suspends Jean Chisenga for 7 days for disorderly conduct". Zambia: News Diggers. Archived from the original on 29 June 2025.
- Mbulo, Edwin (6 April 2025). "Mutti gets elected IPU Vice-President, pledges to champion African unity". Zambia: News Diggers. Archived from the original on 29 June 2025.
- Mofya, Mwenya (22 February 2025). "Speaker denies request to declare 4 PF seats vacant". Zambia: News Diggers. Archived from the original on 29 June 2025.
- Mofya, Mwenya (23 February 2024). "Speaker prohibits wearing of Ngoni traditional headbands in Parley". Zambia: News Diggers. Archived from the original on 29 June 2025.
- Shalubala, Chamuka (25 July 2024). "Speaker suspends Kafwaya for accusing her of sharing ruling". Zambia: News Diggers. Archived from the original on 29 June 2025.

=== Web ===
- "Nelly Butete Kashumba Mutti". Emeritus Reinsurance. Archived from the original on 29 June 2025.
- "Nelly Butete Kashumba Mutti, SC". National Assembly of Zambia. Archived from the original on 29 June 2025.
- "Zambia". Inter-Parliamentary Union. Archived from the original on 29 June 2025.
