= Ministry of Justice (Zambia) =

Government ministry of Zambia

The Ministry of Justice is a ministry in Zambia. It is headed by the Minister of Justice. The Mission of the Ministry is to provide legal services, facilitate dispensation of justice and promote governance mechanisms in order to uphold good governance principles and practices in Zambia.

== Departments ==
The Ministry of Justice in Zambia has six departments:

- Department of Human Resource and Administration
- Legislative Drafting and Law Revision Department
- Department of the International Law and Agreements
- Department of Civil Litigation, Debt Collection and Prerogative of Mercy
- Department of Administrator-General and Official Receiver
- Governance Department

== List of ministers ==
Minister	Party	Term start	Term end
Minister of Legal Affairs
Brian Andre Doyle	Ex officio	1959	1962
William McCall	Ex officio	1963	1963
Brian Andre Doyle	Ex officio	1963	1964
Minister of Justice
Mainza Chona	United National Independence Party	1964	1964
James John Skinner	United National Independence Party	1964	1965
Justin Chimba	United National Independence Party	1965	1966
Durton Konoso	United National Independence Party	1966	1967
Minister of Legal Affairs
James John Skinner	United National Independence Party	1967	1968
Fitzpatrick Chuula	Movement for Multi-Party Democracy	1971	1973
Annel M. Silungwe	United National Independence Party	1973	1974
Mainza Chona	United National Independence Party	1975	1977
Daniel Lisulo	National Party (Zambia)	1977	1978
Frederick Chomba	United National Independence Party	1978	1980
Gibson Chigaga	United National Independence Party	1980	1987
Frederick Chomba	United National Independence Party	1987	1991
Rodger Chongwe	Movement for Multi-Party Democracy	1991	1992
Ludwig Sondashi	Forum for Democratic Alternative	1993	1995
Amusaa Mwanamwambwa	Movement for Multi-Party Democracy	1995	1996
Vincent Malambo	Movement for Multi-Party Democracy	1996	2001
Minister of Justice
George Kunda	Movement for Multi-Party Democracy	2002	2012
Wynter Kabimba	Patriotic Front	2012	2014
Edgar Lungu	Patriotic Front	2014	2015
Ngosa Simbyakula	Patriotic Front	2015	2016
Given Lubinda	Patriotic Front	2016	2021
Mulambo Haimbe	United Party for National Development	2021	2024
Princess Kasune	United Party for National Development	2024	2026
Jacob Mwiimbu	United Party for National Development	2026	

== See also ==
- Justice ministry
- Politics of Zambia
