= National Reconciliation Party for Unity and Prosperity =

- Abbreviation: NRPUP
- Leader: Ezra Tembo
- Founded: 2026
- National affiliation: Tonse Alliance (until 2026)
- Colours: Blue; Orange
- National Assembly: 67 / 266

Website
- nrpup.org

The National Reconciliation Party for Unity and Prosperity (NRPUP) is a political party in Zambia. The president of the political party is Ezra Tembo.

== History ==
In January 2026, Brian Mundubile was chosen as the presidential candidate for the Tonse Alliance. Initially, the alliance agreed to use the Forum for Democracy and Development (FDD) political party for candidacy at the 2026 general election but after FDD party members expressed issues in May 2026, Mundubile announced that he would use a different political party for his candidacy for president, namely the National Reconciliation Party for Unity and Prosperity (NRPUP). While Mundubile stood for presidency, party president Ezra Tembo instead stood as the party's candidate for the Dag Hammarskjöld parliamentary seat.

In May 2026, the Tonse Alliance and the PF Pamodzi Alliance made a unity agreement for their leaders to work together. The agreement that was formed was for Makebi Zulu, a leader in the Resolute Party (RP) in the PF Pamodzi Alliance, to be the running mate (vice president) for Mundubile and the merger of the two alliances would be called the Tonse-Pamodzi Alliance with the NRPUP being the primary party used in the presidential campaign instead of the RP. However, at the time, the RP and the NRPUP had both adopted candidates for parliament and local government positions in some districts, which meant that the two parties had candidates that were in competition in those districts while they did not field candidates in 72 of the 226 constituencies in Zambia. During the 2026 election campaign, Mundubule pledged an investment in Nitrogen Chemicals of Zambia (NCZ) to create jobs as well as teachers allowances and improved housing.

In the 2026 Zambian general election, the NRPUP were projected to be the largest opposition party and they won 59 of the 226 parliamentary seats while finishing second to Hakainde Hichilema of the UPND in the presidential election. Party president Ezra Tembo, who had won the Dag Hammarskjöld parliamentary seat in Ndola District, accepted the outcome of the election while presidential candidate Mundubile was unsatisfied with the election results.
