= National Assembly of Zambia =

Unicameral legislature of Zambia

- 14th National Assembly

Type
- Type: Unicameral

Leadership
- Speaker: Nelly Butete Kashumba Mutti, UPND
- First Deputy Speaker: Malungo Chisangano, UPND
- Second Deputy Speaker: Nshamba Mulondwe Muzungu, Independent
- Leader of Government Business: Mutale Nalumango, UPND
- Leader of the Opposition: Ezra Tembo, NRPUP

Structure
- Seats: 280
- Political groups: Government (185): UPND (171); Nominated (11); Ex-officio (3); Official Opposition (67): NRPUP (67); Others (28): Independents (20); RP (5); CF (2); ZMP (1)

Elections
- Voting system: Mixed-member majoritarian representation: First-past-the-post (226 seats); Party-list proportional representation allocated by presidential party vote (40 reserved seats); Appointed by the president (Up to 11 seats); Ex-officios (3 seats)
- Last election: 13 August 2026
- Next election: August 2031

Meeting place
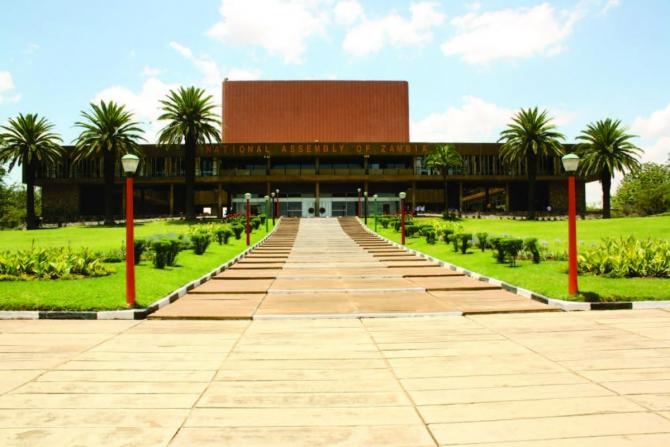
- Lusaka

Website
- National Assembly of Zambia

The National Assembly is Zambia's unicameral legislative body. Between 1972 and 1990, Zambia was a one-party state with the United National Independence Party (UNIP) as the sole legal party.

Elections to the National Assembly are conducted under a mixed electoral system. The assembly consists of 226 members directly elected in single-member constituencies using the first-past-the-post system, alongside 40 members elected through proportional representation reserved for women (20 seats), youths (15 seats), and persons with disabilities (5 seats). The proportional representation seats are distributed to political parties by the Electoral Commission following a general election in a parallel way in proportion to the total number of valid votes received by each party's presidential candidate. Up to 11 additional members may be appointed by the President, provided the total number of nominated members does not exceed five percent of the constituency-based seats. The Speaker, First and Second Deputy Speakers, and the Vice President also hold seats in the assembly.

== Electoral system ==
Elections to the National Assembly are conducted under a mixed parallel voting (non-proportional) system, which has been falsely reported as "mixed-member proportional" (even in the constitutional text), despite being mixed-member majoritarian representation. Of the members of the National Assembly, 226 are elected by the first-past-the-post system in single-member constituencies, and 40 are elected through a proportional representation system reserved for women (20 seats), youths (15 seats), and persons with disabilities (5 seats). Proportional representation seats are distributed to political parties by the Electoral Commission based on the proportion of total valid votes received by their respective presidential candidate (without taking into account constituency seats, therefore being parallel, not mixed-proportional). Up to 11 additional members may be appointed by the President, provided the total number does not exceed five percent of the constituency-based seats. The Vice President, the Speaker, and both the First and Second Deputy Speakers also hold seats in the assembly. The minimum voting age is 18, whilst National Assembly candidates must be at least 21.

== Location ==
At the time of Zambia's independence in 1964, the National Assembly was housed in inadequate and unsuitable premises behind the Government's Central Offices in Lusaka, commonly known as the "Secretariat Area". It was, therefore, apparent at the time of independence that a more fitting building should be constructed to meet future expansion and also to provide adequate members’ sitting and office accommodations.

A site was chosen on the crown of a low hill in Lusaka, which dominated the surrounding landscape of the city. The site was also, at one time, the site of the dwelling place of the village headman, Lusaka, after whom the city is now named.

The new National Assembly building was planned so that its external appearance expressed the dignity and power of the Government, while internally, it is planned to function as a centre of administration. The focal point of the building is the Chamber, which is rich in decoration and colour, in contrast to the rest of the building.

== 2026 election results ==
The 2026 election was the first to be held under the mixed-member majoritarian system introduced by the Constitution of Zambia (Amendment) Act No. 13 of 2025 (falsely referred to as "mixed-member proportional" in the constitutional text). Previously, the National Assembly had 156 elected constituency-based seats. The amendment increased the number of constituency-based seats by 70, to 226; the ECZ announced the new constituencies on 16 April 2026. It also introduced 40 seats under the proportional representation system, comprising 20 seats reserved for women, 15 for youths and five for persons with disabilities. These seats are allocated by the ECZ to political parties in proportion to the total number of valid votes received by their presidential candidates, rather than being won through individual constituency contests.

99.29% reporting
Party	Seats		
Party	Constituency	Proportional	Total
United Party for National Development	137	32	169
National Reconciliation Party for Unity and Prosperity	59	8	67
Resolute Party	5	0	5
Citizens First	2	0	2
Zambia Must Prosper	1	0	1
Christian Democratic Party	0	0	0
Democratic Union	0	0	0
Leadership Movement	0	0	0
Liberal Democrats Party	0	0	0
Movement for Economic Emancipation	0	0	0
New Focus Party	0	0	0
Organised People's Party	0	0	0
Socialist Party	0	0	0
Zambia Wake-Up Party	0	0	0
Independents	20	0	20
Appointed members	–	–	14
Total	224	40	278
Source: Zambia Decides

The 40 proportional-representation seats were allocated as follows:

- Women: 20 seats — UPND 17, NRPUP 3
- Youth: 15 seats — UPND 12, NRPUP 3
- Persons with disabilities: 5 seats — UPND 3, NRPUP 2

== 2021 election results ==
Party	Votes	%	Seats	+/–
United Party for National Development	2,230,324	46.22	82	+24
Patriotic Front	1,722,718	35.70	60	–20
Socialist Party	61,325	1.27	0	New
Democratic Party	50,886	1.05	0	0
People's Alliance for Change	20,227	0.42	0	0
Party of National Unity and Progress	13,178	0.27	1	+1
United National Independence Party	12,742	0.26	0	0
Forum for Democracy and Development	4,006	0.08	0	–1
National Democratic Congress	3,807	0.08	0	New
Movement for Multi-Party Democracy	3,665	0.08	0	–3
Leadership Movement	3,585	0.07	0	New
Christian Democratic Party	3,471	0.07	0	New
New Heritage Party	1,762	0.04	0	0
Golden Party Zambia	858	0.02	0	New
National Restoration Party	664	0.01	0	0
Zambians United for Sustainable Development	554	0.01	0	New
Green Party of Zambia	499	0.01	0	0
United Prosperous and Peaceful Zambia	309	0.01	0	New
Movement for Democratic Change	306	0.01	0	New
Patriots for Economic Progress	232	0.00	0	New
Economic Freedom Fighters	104	0.00	0	0
Independents	690,418	14.31	13	–1
Appointed and ex-officio			11	–
Total	4,825,640	100.00	167	0
Valid votes	4,825,640	97.74		
Invalid/blank votes	111,726	2.26		
Total votes	4,937,366	100.00		
Registered voters/turnout	7,023,499	70.30		
Source: Electoral Commission

== Previous National Assembly election results ==
Political Party	Election Year												
Political Party	1964	1968	1973	1978	1983	1991	1996	2001	2006	2011	2016	2021	2026
United National Independence Party (UNIP)	55	81	125	125	125	25	-	13	-*	-	-	-	-
Movement for Multi-Party Democracy (MMD)	-	-	-	-	-	125	131	69	74	55	3	-	-
National Reconciliation Party for Unity and Prosperity (NRPUP)	-	-	-	-	-	-	-	-	-	-	-	-	76
Resolute Party (RP)	-	-	-	-	-	-	-	-	-	-	-	-	5
Citizens First (CF)	-	-	-	-	-	-	-	-	-	-	-	-	2
Zambia Must Prosper (ZMP)	-	-	-	-	-	-	-	-	-	-	-	-	1
Patriotic Front (PF)	-	-	-	-	-	-	-	1	44	60	80	59	-
United Party for National Development (UPND)	-	-	-	-	-	-	-	49	-*	28	58	82	174
Alliance for Democracy and Development	-	-	-	-	-	-	-	-	-	1	-	-	-
Forum for Democracy and Development (FDD)	-	-	-	-	-	-	-	12	-*	1	1	-	-
United Liberal Party (ULP)	-	-	-	-	-	-	-	-	2	-	-	-	-
New Heritage Party (NHP)	-	-	-	-	-	-	-	4	-	-	-	-	-
Zambia Republican Party (ZRP)	-	-	-	-	-	-	-	1	-	-	-	-	-
National Party (NP)	-	-	-	-	-	-	5	-	-	-	-	-	-
Zambia Democratic Congress (ZDC)	-	-	-	-	-	-	2	-	-	-	-	-	-
Party of National Unity and Progress (PNUP)	-	-	-	-	-	-	-	-	-	-	-	1	-
United Democratic Alliance (UDA)	-	-	-	-	-	-	-	-	27*	-	-	-	-
National Democratic Focus (NDF)	-	-	-	-	-	-	-	-	1	-	-	-	-
Zambian African National Congress (ZANC)	10	23	-	-	-	-	-	-	-	-	-	-	-
National Progressive Party (NPP)	10	-	-	-	-	-	-	-	-	-	-	-	-
Agenda for Zambia (AZ)	-	-	-	-	-	-	2	-	-	-	-	-	-
Independents	-	-	-	-	-	-	10	1	2	3	14	13	-
Others	-	1	11	11	11	-	-	-	-	11	-	-	-
Total	75	105	136	136	136	150	150	150	150	159	156	167	278
*UPND, FDD, and UNIP contested the 2006 election under the UDA alliance Italics denote defunct parties and alliances

== See also ==
- History of Zambia
- Bibliography of the history of Zambia
- Politics of Zambia
- List of Zambian parliamentary constituencies
- List of legislatures by country
- List of speakers of the National Assembly of Zambia
- Legislative branch
- Electoral Commission of Zambia (ECZ)
- The Constitution of Zambia
