= 2026 Zambian general election =

- 13 August 2026
- Presidential election
- Registered: 8,786,300
- Turnout: 57.23% (▼13.38 pp)
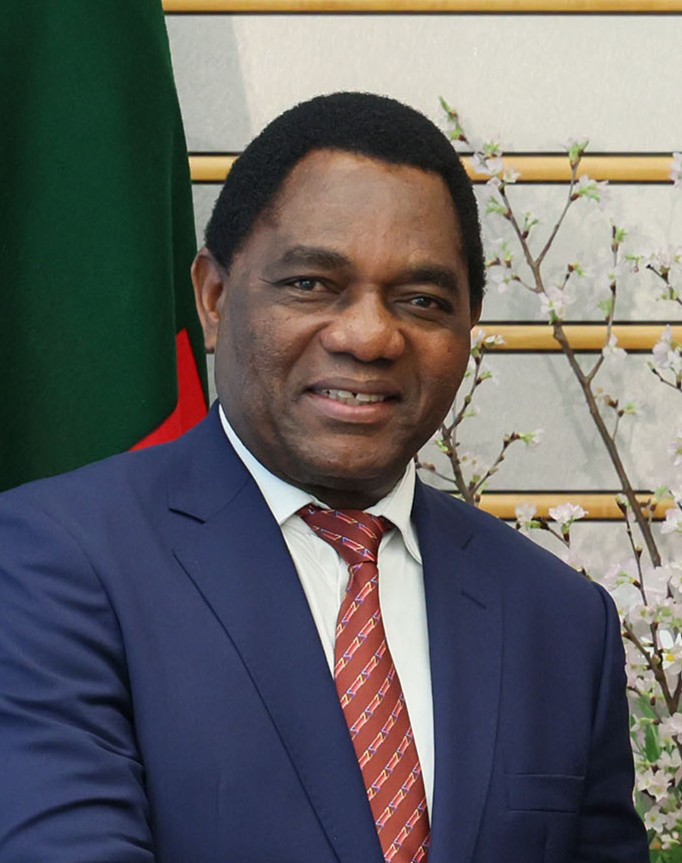
| | | NRPUP |
| Candidate | Hakainde Hichilema | Brian Mundubile |
| Party | UPND | NRPUP |
| Alliance | UPND Alliance | Tonse Alliance |
| Running mate | Mutale Nalumango | Makebi Zulu |
| Popular vote | 2,965,326 | 1,856,222 |
| Percentage | 60.49% | 37.87% |
President before election
Hakainde Hichilema
UPND
Elected President
Hakainde Hichilema
UPND
- Parliamentary election
- 226 of the 280 seats in the National Assembly; 141 seats needed for a majority
- Reporting: 99.29% as of 19 August 10:32 CAT
| Party | Leader | Seats |
|---|---|---|
| UPND | Hakainde Hichilema | 136 |
| NRPUP | Ezra Tembo | 60 |
| RP | Martin Phiri | 5 |
| CF | Harry Kalaba | 2 |
| ZMP | Kelvin Bwalya | 1 |
| Independents | – | 20 |
This lists parties that won seats. See the complete results below.
National Assembly results by constituency
| Speaker of the National Assembly before | Speaker of the National Assembly after |
|---|---|
| Nelly Mutti; UPND | Nelly Mutti; UPND |

General elections were held in Zambia on 13 August 2026 to elect a president, members of the National Assembly, councillors and council chairs.

In the presidential election, incumbent president Hakainde Hichilema of the United Party for National Development (UPND) was seeking a second term. His running mate was incumbent vice president Mutale Nalumango. There were 13 other candidates, with the main challenge being from Brian Mundubile of the Tonse Alliance's National Reconciliation Party for Unity and Prosperity (NRPUP), and his running mate Makebi Zulu. Hichilema won the election in the first round with 60.49% of the vote; Mundubile received 37.87%.

In the National Assembly, the UPND won a majority, obtaining 160 of the 278 seats. The NRPUP came second, with 76 seats. Independents, smaller parties and directly appointed members received the remaining 42 seats.

Mundubile alleged Tanzanian interference in the election. He was arrested in a raid while the votes were being counted, and refused to accept the results. International observers reported that the election was free and transparent, but not fair due to misuse of state resources and restrictions on opposition campaigns. The same raid that resulted in Mundubile's arrest saw the arrest of 10 additional people and the death of Mutotwe Kafwaya, a former minister.

== Background ==
The 2026 presidential election was the first contest for Hakainde Hichilema since he defeated incumbent president Edgar Lungu in 2021. Hichilema's victory brought the UPND to power after the Patriotic Front's ten-year period in government. The 2021 election was widely seen as a referendum on Lungu's administration, which had faced criticism over economic difficulties, unemployment, public debt and allegations concerning governance and human rights.

During Hichilema's first term, the government's economic record became the central issue likely to determine the presidential election. Hichilema's administration inherited a country that had defaulted on its sovereign debt in 2020 and subsequently pursued a major debt-restructuring programme. The government also sought to restore relations with international lenders, attract foreign investment and expand production in the copper sector.

The government presented the debt restructuring and improving macroeconomic conditions as evidence of an economic recovery. However, the recovery did not benefit all households equally. The cost of living, unemployment, poverty and electricity shortages remained important concerns, particularly among young people and lower-income voters. The election was consequently expected to serve as a test of whether improvements in economic indicators had translated into better living conditions for the wider population.

Hichilema's position as the UPND's presidential candidate was confirmed at the party's convention in April 2026, where he was nominated without opposition. He campaigned for a second term on the record of his administration and on a programme of continued economic recovery and investment.

The opposition attempted to consolidate behind the Tonse Alliance, which had been established in November 2024 with the objective of defeating the UPND in the presidential election. In January 2026, the alliance selected Brian Mundubile, a former member of parliament and former ally of Lungu, as its presidential candidate. Mundubile was initially expected to contest under the Forum for Democracy and Development (FDD) ticket, but he later filed his nomination under the National Reconciliation Party for Unity and Prosperity (NRPUP).

The death of Edgar Lungu in 2025 further reshaped the presidential contest. Although Lungu was not a candidate, his political legacy continued to influence the opposition campaign. His supporters became an important part of the coalition backing Mundubile, while the rivalry between Lungu and Hichilema continued to shape political debate.

A dispute between Lungu's family and the Zambian government over the former president's burial intensified the political confrontation. The disagreement was used by opposition figures to accuse the government of disrespecting Lungu and his family, while the government maintained its position regarding the burial arrangements. The dispute became a prominent issue during the campaign and helped turn the election into a contest not only over Hichilema's record, but also over Lungu's political legacy.

Although 14 candidates were initially nominated, the presidential race was principally viewed as a contest between Hichilema and Mundubile. Hichilema sought to retain power by presenting his first-term economic programme as the basis for continued recovery, while Mundubile sought to unite the opposition and mobilise support associated with Lungu's former political base. Other presidential candidates, included Harry Kalaba, Fred M'membe, Given Katuta Mwelwa, Kelvin Bwalya Fube and Brian Mushimba, competed for votes but did not command the same level of support as the two leading candidates.

== Electoral system ==
The president is elected via the two-round system. The second round is dispensed with if a candidate secures more than 50% of the vote in the first round.

Following amendments to the constitution in 2025, the electoral system for the National Assembly was changed. Previously 156 members had been elected by the first-past-the-post in single-member constituencies, with a further eight appointed by the president and three others being ex officio members: the vice president, the Speaker and a deputy speaker elected from outside the National Assembly. The 2025 changes introduced a mixed-member majoritarian (non-proportional) representation system, with 226 members elected by first-past-the-post from single-member constituencies, 40 members elected by proportional representation based on the presidential vote (of which 20 are seats reserved for women, 15 for youth and five for persons with disabilities), up to 11 members appointed by the president and the vice-president, Speaker and first and second deputy speakers.

The minimum voting age is 18, whilst National Assembly candidates must be at least 21.

== Presidential candidates ==
Incumbent president Hakainde Hichilema received endorsements from some members of the UPND Alliance, including Highvie Hamududu, leader of the Party of National Unity and Progress (in November 2024), Nevers Mumba, leader of the Movement for Multi-Party Democracy (in October 2024), Leslie Chikuse, leader of the Republican Progressive Party, Ezra Ngulube, leader of the National Restoration Party, Charles Milupi, the alliance chairperson, and Felix Mutati, leader of the Movement for Democratic Change.

The former ruling party, the Patriotic Front, and a number of fellow opposition parties formed the Tonse Alliance in November 2024 with the goal to unseat the UPND in the 2026 election. Former president Edgar Lungu was announced as the chairman and presidential candidate, but was declared ineligible to stand by the Constitutional Court saying he had already served the maximum two terms allowed by law on 10 December 2024 and then died in 2025. On 28 January 2026, Member of Parliament Brian Mundubile, was elected as the alliance's presidential candidate and in May 2026, it was decided that the National Reconciliation Party for Unity and Prosperity (NRPUP) was chosen as the party to be used by the alliance at the election.

Harry Kalaba of the Citizens First party ran as a candidate for the CF Orange Alliance and was endorsed by members of the alliance, including Saboi Imboela (the National Democratic Congress president). Fred M'membe ran as the candidate of the Socialist Party. Given Katuta Mwelwa, who had been the member of parliament for Chiengi constituency for 10 years, ran as an independent presidential candidate.

On 12 August the Electoral Commission of Zambia (ECZ) excluded Xavier Franklin Chungu of the Liberal Democratic Party as a presidential candidate, stating that Chungu was not eligible to contest the election because he had withdrawn his candidacy and that any votes cast for Chungu would be invalid.

== Campaign ==
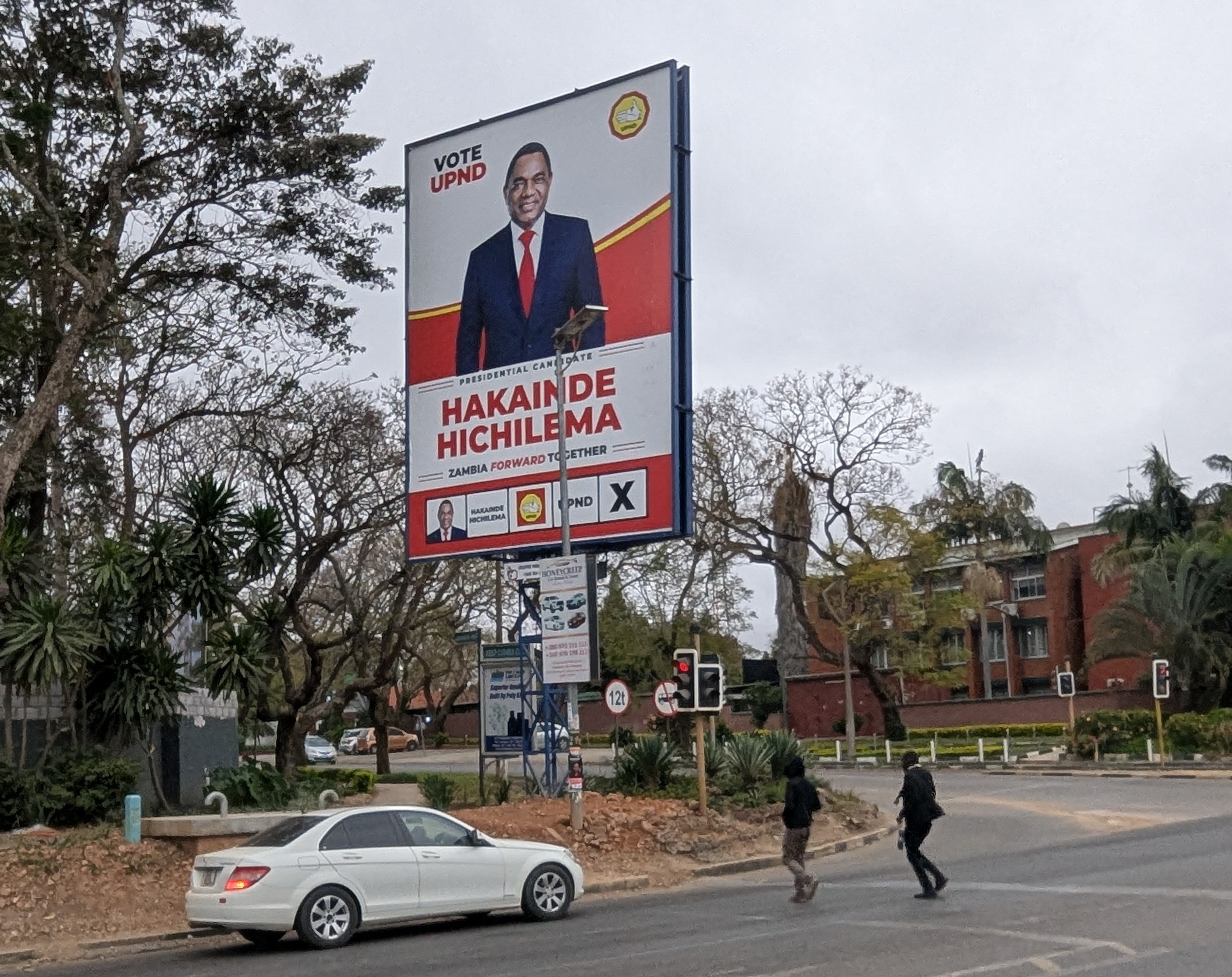
Hichilema's campaign billboard in Lusaka.

After the presidential nominations, the Electoral Commission of Zambia introduced a timetable for campaign activities, including rallies and other events involving the presidential candidates. The official campaign period ran from 21 May to 12 August 2026.

Hichilema campaigned for a second term by pointing to his government's economic record. His campaign highlighted Zambia's debt-restructuring programme, the restoration of relations with international lenders, investment in the copper industry and the expansion of public services. The UPND campaign also promised to continue efforts to reduce the cost of living, create jobs, expand free education and support agriculture.

The economic record also became a point of dispute between Hichilema and Mundubile. In June, Mundubile questioned the government's emphasis on Zambia's foreign-exchange reserves, which had reached about US$6.5 billion, arguing that the reserves were not improving the living conditions of ordinary Zambians while the cost of living remained high. He also questioned the significance of the decline in inflation, saying that lower inflation did not mean that prices had fallen.

Former Finance and National Planning Minister Situmbeko Musokotwane criticised Mundubile's position, saying that foreign-exchange reserves and inflation were important indicators of the state of the economy. He said the reserves were used to support imports, meet external obligations and protect the economy from external shocks. Hichilema also responded to Mundubile during the launch of his presidential campaign on 28 June, defending the reserves as a form of protection for the economy. He said they could be used during events such as droughts or external crises and accused Mundubile and his running mate Makebi Zulu of wanting to spend the reserves. The debate continued into July, with discussion focusing on whether the increase in foreign-exchange reserves was translating into improvements in household living standards. A Lusaka Times analysis noted the contrast between the country's stronger reserve position and continued concerns about the cost of living.

The opposition's main campaign message focused on the economic difficulties faced by many Zambians. Mundubile argued that the high cost of living showed the failure of the government's policies. He campaigned on reducing living costs, strengthening agriculture and manufacturing, creating opportunities for young people and restoring what he described as democratic freedoms. The opposition's other message campaign was also influenced by the unresolved burial of former president Edgar Lungu, who died in June 2025. At a campaign rally in Chinsali, Mundubile said that he and Makebi Zulu would give Lungu a dignified burial if elected. The statement prompted State House to question whether Lungu had wished to be buried under a future Mundubile government. The Tonse Alliance also drew support from sections of the opposition associated with Lungu and the former Patriotic Front government. The dispute between Lungu's family and the government over his burial became an issue during the campaign and added to tensions between Lungu's supporters and Hichilema’s government.

Another challenger was Xavier Franklin Chungu, a former director-general of the Zambia Security Intelligence Service. Chungu was arrested on 28 May 2026 and charged with offences including violations of the State Security Act and sedition. He remained in detention during the campaign and was unable to campaign for the presidency. Chungu later withdrew from the election and endorsed Mundubile.

On 9 August, Binwell Mpundu, the Tonse Alliance's Presidential Affairs Chairman, posted a video on his Facebook page in which he said that he and others were ready to "die" and "kill" for the election. He said the stakes were high and that he was prepared to be killed or to kill if he believed that something went wrong during the election. Mpundu later deleted the video and said that it had been generated using artificial intelligence and that his Facebook account had been compromised by a hacker. Brian Mundubile, the NRPUP presidential candidate, also described the video as AI-generated and said that Mpundu would not make such remarks.

On 10 August, Mpundu changed his explanation and acknowledged that he had made the statement. He said that his remarks had been taken out of context and were intended to refer to self-defence. He apologised for the statement and criticised his media team for telling Mundubile that the video was AI-generated. The remarks were condemned by State House, the United Party for National Development and church leaders, who called for political leaders to avoid statements that could encourage violence.

On 12 August, the Electoral Commission of Zambia revoked Mpundu's accreditation to access the National Results Centre, citing public safety and security concerns. The ECZ said that the remarks had the potential to incite violence, create public unrest and undermine the peaceful conduct of the electoral process. The decision was made under section 77(6) of the Electoral Process Act and paragraph 11(1)(c) of the Electoral Code of Conduct.

As polling day approached, the presidential campaign became more competitive. Hichilema held a final rally in Lusaka, where he urged voters to give him a second term to continue his economic programme. Mundubile accused the authorities of using arrests and other measures to intimidate opposition supporters.

== Opinion polls ==
An opinion poll conducted by consultants led by a University of Zambia demographer showed Hichilema leading with 60% of the vote with the combined opposition getting 35%. In head-to-head matchups with different opposition candidates, Hichilema's support was between 58% and 63%.

== Conduct ==
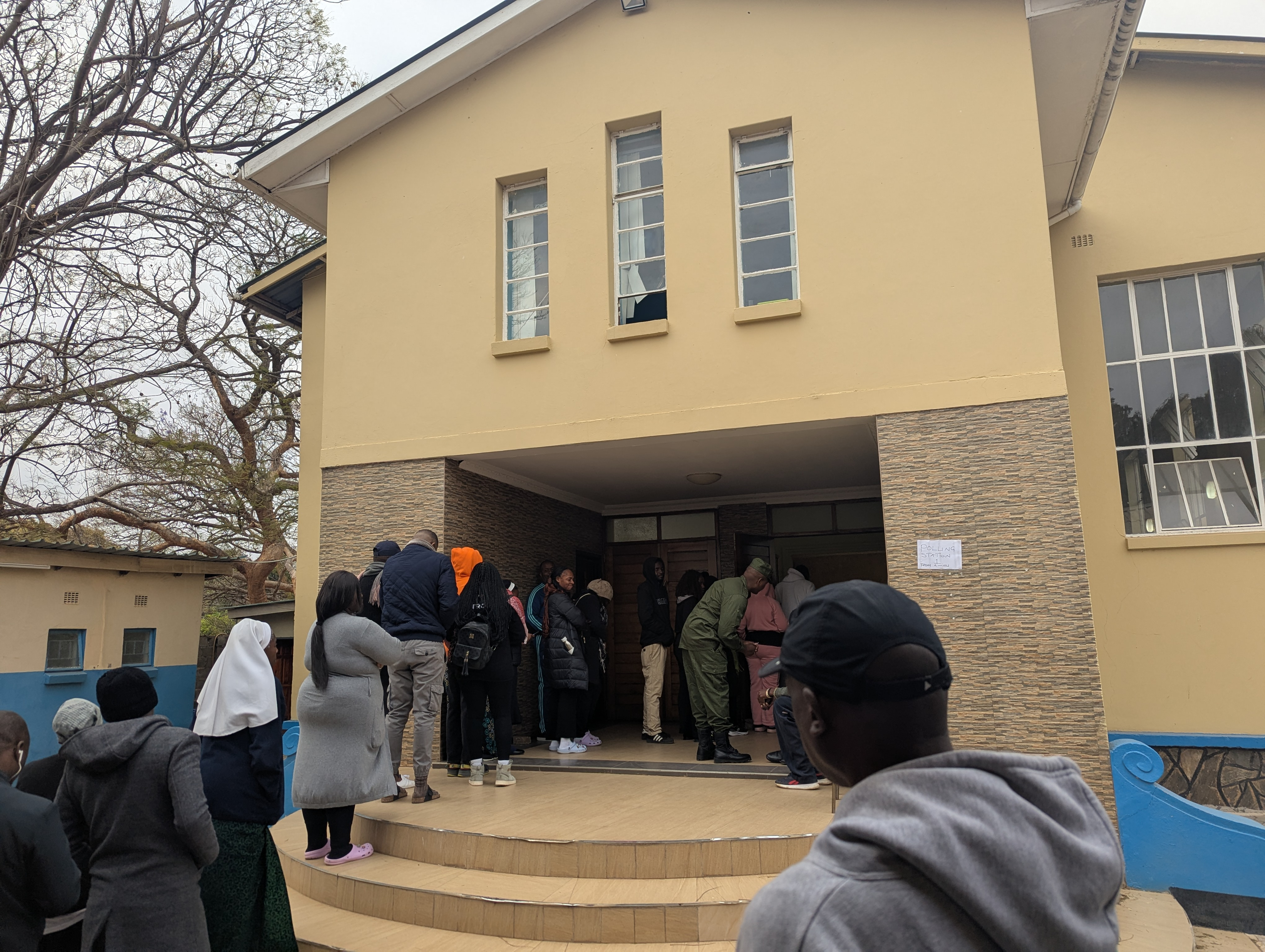
People in line for voting at St Mary's School In Lusaka

Voting was held on 13 August. Inspector General Graphel Musamba stated that the election was mostly peaceful, but police made several arrests for violence, including: nine suspects detained over the fatal assault of polling agent Lovemore Chishima in Matero; six men apprehended with weapons and ammunition in Lusaka with police seeking Sean Tembo for questioning; one suspect arrested after a shooting in Kalomo; and another detained following an attack on an official's residence in Kasama.

On 14 August, the ECZ suspended the counting of votes, citing attacks and threats against voting staff. Counting was resumed on the following day.

While counting was suspended, police arrested 11 people in Lusaka, including opposition candidate Brian Mundubile, on suspicion of plotting an insurrection. Mundubile denied the accusations and said he was the subject of an assassination attempt. Mutotwe Kafwaya, a former minister, was also killed during the raids.

On 14 August opposition presidential candidate Brian Mundubile said that he had won the election. He based the claim on his campaign's Parallel Vote Tabulation (PVT), which he said was based on results received from polling stations and totalling centres across the country. In his statement, Mundubile said that the results compiled through his party's PVT showed that he had won the election. At the time, the ECZ had not announced a winner and was still verifying and tabulating results from the 226 constituencies.

George Chisanga, the Tonse presidential spokesperson, later said that Mundubile had not "declared himself a winner", but had presented his campaign's parallel tally as showing that he was ahead.

== Results ==
=== President ===
The Electoral Commission of Zambia declared incumbent president Hakainde Hichilema the winner of the presidential election on 18 August 2026. Hichilema, who was seeking a second term with Mutale Nalumango as his running mate, defeated Brian Mundubile of the National Reconciliation Party for Unity and Prosperity (NRPUP). He won by a margin of 1,213,050 votes and received more than 50% of the valid vote, avoiding a second round. Hichilema won the presidential vote in 124 of the 226 constituencies, while Mundubile led in 102. The result gave Hichilema a second consecutive presidential victory after he defeated Edgar Lungu in the 2021 presidential election. A total of 5,119,417 ballots were cast from 8,786,300 registered voters, giving a turnout of 58.27%. Of the ballots cast, 4,992,823 were valid and 126,594 were rejected. Mundubile rejected the result and said that he and his party would challenge Hichilema's victory in court, alleging irregularities and electoral fraud.

| Candidate | Running mate | Party | Votes | % |
|---|---|---|---|---|
| Hakainde Hichilema | Mutale Nalumango | United Party for National Development | 3,071,706 | 61.28 |
| Brian Mundubile | Makebi Zulu | National Reconciliation Party for Unity and Prosperity | 1,858,656 | 37.08 |
| Harry Kalaba | Moses Mawere | Citizens First | 18,975 | 0.38 |
| Kelvin Bwalya | Milner Katolo | Zambia Must Prosper | 18,146 | 0.36 |
| Fred M'membe | Dolika Banda | Socialist Party | 12,158 | 0.24 |
| Given Katuta | John Nyirenda | Independent | 7,620 | 0.15 |
| Given Chansa | Harrison Chewe | Movement for Economic Emancipation | 7,426 | 0.15 |
| Brian Mushimba | Andyford Banda | Organised People's Party | 6,127 | 0.12 |
| Richard Silumbe | Kaela Kamwenesha | Leadership Movement | 3,290 | 0.07 |
| Howard Kunda | Chipo Miyoba | Zambia Wake-Up Party | 2,649 | 0.05 |
| Ackim Njobvu | — | Democratic Union | 2,521 | 0.05 |
| Richwell Siamunene | — | New Focus Party | 1,967 | 0.04 |
| Daniel Pule | — | Christian Democratic Party | 1,359 | 0.03 |
| ~~Xavier Chungu~~ (Note: Xavier was withdrawn of as presidential candidate by ECZ) | ~~Gerald Dingiswayo Mwanza~~ | ~~Liberal Democrats Party~~ | 0 | 0.00 |
| Total | | | 5,012,600 | 100.00 |
| Registered voters/turnout | | | 8,786,300 | – |
Source: Zambia Decides

=== National Assembly ===
The 2026 election was the first to be held under the mixed-member majoritarian representation system introduced by the Constitution of Zambia (Amendment) Act No. 13 of 2025. Previously, the National Assembly had 156 elected constituency-based seats. The amendment increased the number of constituency-based seats by 70, to 226; the ECZ announced the new constituencies on 16 April 2026. It also introduced 40 seats under the proportional representation system, comprising 20 seats reserved for women, 15 for youths and five for persons with disabilities. These seats are allocated by the ECZ to political parties in proportion to the total number of valid votes received by their presidential candidates, rather than being won through individual constituency contests. This makes it a parallel voting (non-proportional) system, which has been falsely reported as "mixed-member proportional" (even in the constitutional text), despite being mixed-member majoritarian representation

99.29% reporting
| Party | Seats | | |
| Party | Constituency | Proportional | Total |
|---|---|---|---|
| United Party for National Development | 137 | 32 | 169 |
| National Reconciliation Party for Unity and Prosperity | 59 | 8 | 67 |
| Resolute Party | 5 | 0 | 5 |
| Citizens First | 2 | 0 | 2 |
| Zambia Must Prosper | 1 | 0 | 1 |
| Christian Democratic Party | 0 | 0 | 0 |
| Democratic Union | 0 | 0 | 0 |
| Leadership Movement | 0 | 0 | 0 |
| Liberal Democrats Party | 0 | 0 | 0 |
| Movement for Economic Emancipation | 0 | 0 | 0 |
| New Focus Party | 0 | 0 | 0 |
| Organised People's Party | 0 | 0 | 0 |
| Socialist Party | 0 | 0 | 0 |
| Zambia Wake-Up Party | 0 | 0 | 0 |
| Independents | 20 | 0 | 20 |
| Appointed members | – | – | 14 |
| Total | 224 | 40 | 278 |
Source: Zambia Decides

The 40 proportional-representation seats were allocated as follows:

- Women: 20 seats — UPND 17, NRPUP 3
- Youth: 15 seats — UPND 12, NRPUP 3
- Persons with disabilities: 5 seats — UPND 3, NRPUP 2

== Reactions ==
=== Domestic ===
Following his re-election, Hichilema in a Facebook post thanked voters for their support and said his administration would focus on national unity, peace and development. He also said his government would work to address the concerns of voters who supported opposition candidates.

On 15 August, a video circulated on social media in which Mundubile alleged that the UPND had hired Tanzanian nationals to interfere with the election. He claimed that the UPND could not win the election and was attempting to use what he described as “Tanzanian tactics” to influence the outcome. Mundubile called on Tanzanians allegedly involved in election-related activities to leave Zambia. The Tanzanian government subsequently denied that it had sent anyone to Zambia to interfere in the election, saying that Tanzanian nationals present in the country could have been participating in the SADC election observer mission. Mundubile rejected the outcome of the election, saying that he and his party would challenge the results through legal channels.

On 19 August Citizens First presidential candidate Harry Kalaba described the elections as one of the most deeply flawed in Zambia's history and called for a thorough, transparent and independent review of the electoral process. Kalaba cited reports of intimidation, interference with polling processes, inconsistencies in the handling of electoral materials and uneven application of the law. He also commended the Tonse Alliance, for what he described as a “spirited and courageous fight” during the election.

=== International observers ===
On 15 August in a preliminary statement issued by the European Union's Election Observation Mission described the election as competitive but said that restrictions on fundamental freedoms had resulted in an uneven playing field. It also reported that voting and counting at the polling stations observed were generally transparent, with party and candidate agents present. The mission also raised concerns about the misuse of state resources during campaigning, restrictions affecting political parties and candidates, and limited public information from the ECZ on election day. The EU mission remained in Zambia to observe these developments and said it would publish a final report with detailed recommendations within two months of the conclusion of the electoral process.

== Aftermath ==
=== Kabulonga security operation and militia allegations ===
On the night of 13 August 2026, the day of the presidential election, a joint security operation was conducted at a premises in the Kabulonga area of Lusaka. According to a government statement read by Secretary to the Cabinet Patrick Kangwa, the operation targeted a suspected militia and “persons of interest”. The government said that restricted high-grade military weapons, ammunition and other materials allegedly intended for armed insurrection were recovered during the operation.

The government said 11 people were apprehended and faced various criminal charges. Those named included George Chisanga, Dr Bishop Trevor Mwamba, Simon Phiri, Richard Banda, Francis Mulenga and Patrick Mwansa. It also said that some of the occupants opened fire on law-enforcement officers, resulting in an exchange of gunfire, while other suspects fled the scene.

Brian Mundubile, the presidential candidate of the NRPUP, was reported to have been among those found at the premises during the operation. The government linked the operation to suspected militia activity and alleged plans for armed insurrection. Mundubile and the NRPUP rejected the allegations. The party said it rejected claims that it, its leadership or its members had been involved in militia or insurgent activity.

Mundubile later told broadcaster Martine Dennis that he had been “reliably informed” that former Transport Minister Kafwaya Mutotwe and his bodyguard Richard Banda had died during the operation. He also denied that the NRPUP maintained a militia or supported violence or attempts to overthrow the constitutional order. The Central Joint Operations Committee later confirmed that Mutotwe Kafwaya had been shot during a joint intelligence-led operation in Kabulonga on 14 August.

=== Court closure and election petition deadline ===
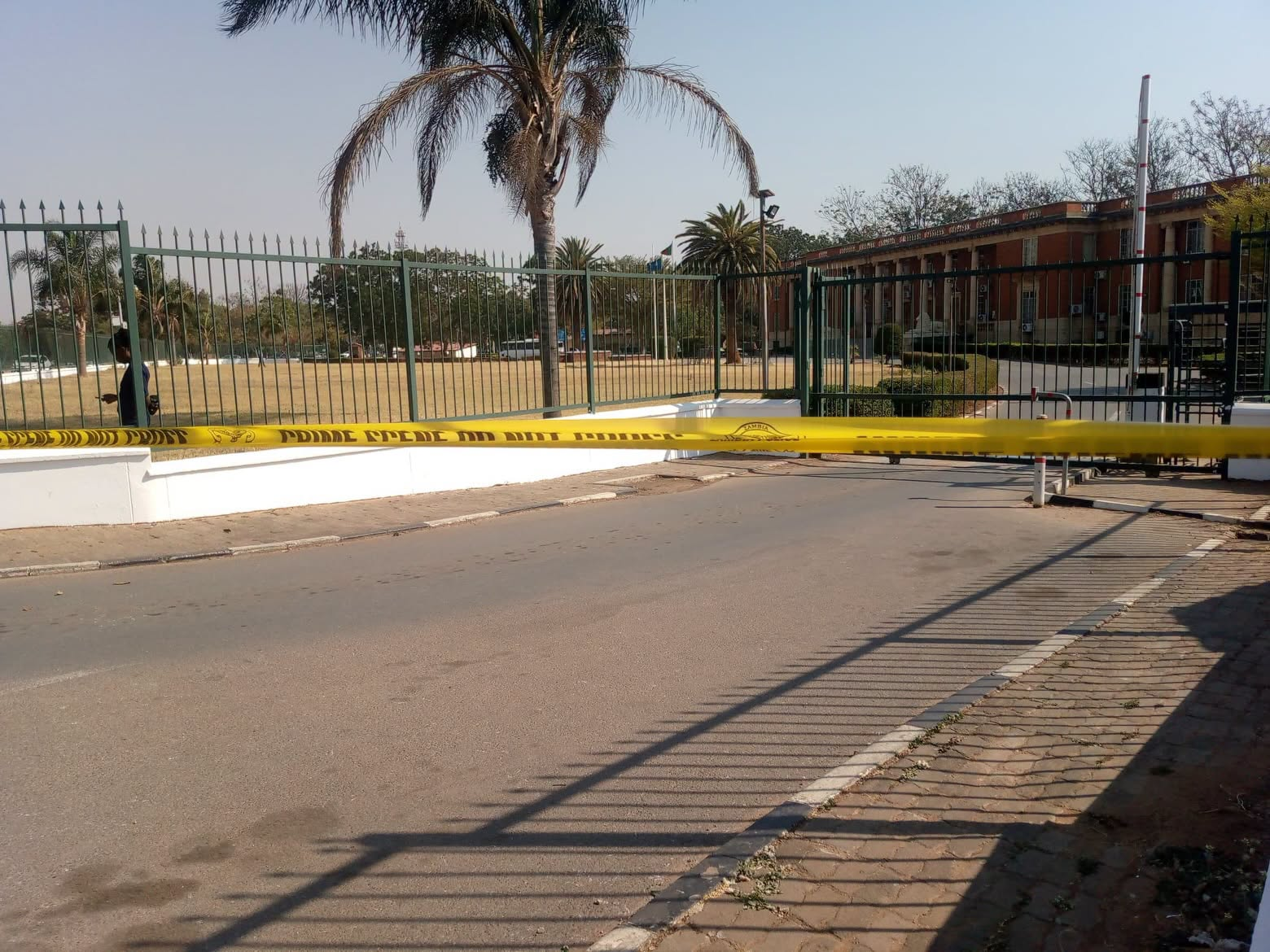
Exterior view of the closed premises of the Zambian judiciary on August 24, 2026.

On 23 August 2026, Mundubile accused the government of trying to prevent him from filing his planned petition challenging the presidential election result. His campaign said that the seven-day period for filing the petition was due to expire on 24 August. By 24 August, Mundubile had not yet filed the petition. His lawyers confirmed that a petition had not been filed. On the same day, court premises in Lusaka and other parts of Zambia were closed, with police deployed at some locations. A memorandum from the Judiciary advised court staff not to report for work, citing security reasons. The closures included the Supreme Court premises, which also house the Constitutional Court of Zambia, as well as High Court premises in several locations. The closure occurred on the final day of the period for filing a presidential election petition. Mundubile had said that he intended to challenge the result, while the government maintained that he was free to use the available legal channels. The reason for the security measures was not immediately made public. Later on 24 August, the Law Association of Zambia (LAZ) called for the courts to be reopened. LAZ president Arnold Kaluba said the closure had implications for access to justice, including for people seeking to file an election petition. The association called on the Judiciary to restore court operations, provide alternative arrangements for urgent filings and protect filing deadlines.

On 25 August, State House rejected claims that President Hichilema had ordered the closure of the courts to prevent the opposition from filing an election petition. Chief Communications Specialist Clayson Hamasaka said the allegation was inconsistent with the Constitution and said the President had no authority to determine when or from whom courts received filings. He said the Judiciary was an independent arm of the state and that the security measures on 24 August were part of intelligence-led and preventive operations at selected government premises. According to Hamasaka, the measures also covered institutions under the Ministry of Justice, the Ministry of Home Affairs and Internal Security, the National Prosecution Authority and the Attorney General's Chambers. He said the measures were intended to protect government institutions, public officers and members of the public accessing the affected premises, rather than target any individual litigant.

Hamasaka also said that suspension of court operations was not without precedent, citing the disruption of court sittings and calendars during the COVID-19 pandemic as an example of court business being suspended for public safety reasons. He maintained that no petition had been lodged against the presidential election result during the period for challenging it and said the law set an outer limit for filing rather than requiring a petitioner to wait until the final hours of that period.

== See also ==
- Presidency of Hakainde Hichilema
- Elections in Zambia
