= List of members of the National Assembly of Zambia (1991–1996) =

The members of the National Assembly of Zambia from 1991 until 1996 were elected on 31 October 1991. Of the 150 elected members, 125 were from the Movement for Multi-Party Democracy and 25 from the United National Independence Party.

== List of members ==
=== Elected members ===
Constituency	Member	Party
Bahati	Valentine Kayope	Movement for Multi-Party Democracy
Bangweulu	Joseph Kasongo	United National Independence Party
Bwacha	Wendy Membe	Movement for Multi-Party Democracy
Bwana Mkubwa	Andrew Kashita	Movement for Multi-Party Democracy
Bweengwa	Baldwin Nkumbula	Movement for Multi-Party Democracy
Chadiza	Shart Banda	United National Independence Party
Chama North	Lightwell Sibale	United National Independence Party
Chama South	Cuthbert Ng'uni	United National Independence Party
Chasefu	Stanley Phiri	United National Independence Party
Chavuma	Benard Fumbelo	United National Independence Party
Chawama	Christon Tembo	Movement for Multi-Party Democracy
Chembe	Mumba Sokontwe	Movement for Multi-Party Democracy
Chiengi	Ephraim Chibwe	Movement for Multi-Party Democracy
Chifubu	Levy Mwanawasa	Movement for Multi-Party Democracy
Chifunabuli	Ernest Mwansa	Movement for Multi-Party Democracy
Chikankata	Joshua Lumina	Movement for Multi-Party Democracy
Chilanga	Collins Hinamanjolo	Movement for Multi-Party Democracy
Chililabombwe	Sikota Wina	Movement for Multi-Party Democracy
Chilubi	Edward Chitungulu	Movement for Multi-Party Democracy
Chimbamilonga	Samuel Mukupa	Movement for Multi-Party Democracy
Chimwemwe	Henry Kristafor	Movement for Multi-Party Democracy
Chingola	Ludwing Sondashi	Movement for Multi-Party Democracy
Chinsali	Katongo Mulenga	Movement for Multi-Party Democracy
Chipangali	Gershom Nkhoma	United National Independence Party
Chipata	Winright Ngondo	United National Independence Party
Chipili	Ntondo Chindoloma	Movement for Multi-Party Democracy
Chisamba	Mwamutenta Musakabantu	Movement for Multi-Party Democracy
Chitambo	Kapilya Lupiya	Movement for Multi-Party Democracy
Choma	Siamujay Siamukayumbu	Movement for Multi-Party Democracy
Chongwe	Gibson Nkausu	Movement for Multi-Party Democracy
Dundumwenzi	Myers Maingalila	Movement for Multi-Party Democracy
Feira	Stanislaus Nyamkandeka	United National Independence Party
Gwembe	Jacob Kantina	Movement for Multi-Party Democracy
Isoka East	Goodwell Ng'ambi	United National Independence Party
Isoka West	Blackson Sikanyika	Movement for Multi-Party Democracy
Itezhi-Tezhi	Mda Shimabo	Movement for Multi-Party Democracy
Kabompo East	Anosh Chipawa	Movement for Multi-Party Democracy
Kabompo West	Mathews Makayi	Movement for Multi-Party Democracy
Kabushi	Abraham Makola	Movement for Multi-Party Democracy
Kabwata	Michael Sata	Movement for Multi-Party Democracy
Kabwe	Paul Tembo	Movement for Multi-Party Democracy
Kafue	Chanda Sosala	Movement for Multi-Party Democracy
Kafulafuta	William Matutu	Movement for Multi-Party Democracy
Kalabo	Arthur Wina	Movement for Multi-Party Democracy
Kalomo	Elias Miyanda	Movement for Multi-Party Democracy
Kalulushi	Bornad Sekwila	Movement for Multi-Party Democracy
Kamfinsa	Lemmy Chipili	Movement for Multi-Party Democracy
Kanchibiya	Newton Ng'uni	Movement for Multi-Party Democracy
Kankoyo	Kangwa Nsuluka	Movement for Multi-Party Democracy
Kantanshi	Elias Chipimo	Movement for Multi-Party Democracy
Kanyama	Marriam Nyanga	Movement for Multi-Party Democracy
Kaoma	Godden Mandandi	Movement for Multi-Party Democracy
Kapiri Mposhi	Gabriel Maka	Movement for Multi-Party Democracy
Kapoche	Ben Zulu	United National Independence Party
Kaputa	Langstone Kapisha	Movement for Multi-Party Democracy
Kasama	Daniel Kapapa	Movement for Multi-Party Democracy
Kasempa	Patrick Kafumukache	Movement for Multi-Party Democracy
Kasenengwa	Patrick Mvunga	United National Independence Party
Katombora	Wonder Sikiti	Movement for Multi-Party Democracy
Katuba	Gilbert Mululu	Movement for Multi-Party Democracy
Kawambwa	Joseph Mpundu	Movement for Multi-Party Democracy
Keembe	Saul Chipwayambokoma	Movement for Multi-Party Democracy
Kwacha	Newstead Zimba	Movement for Multi-Party Democracy
Liuwa	Amusaa Mwanamwambwa	Movement for Multi-Party Democracy
Livingstone	Peter Muunga	Movement for Multi-Party Democracy
Luampa	Stephen Manjata	Movement for Multi-Party Democracy
Luangeni	Johnstone Jere	United National Independence Party
Luanshya	Benjamin Mwila	Movement for Multi-Party Democracy
Luapula	Peter Machungwa	Movement for Multi-Party Democracy
Lubansenshi	Paul Chapuswike	Movement for Multi-Party Democracy
Luena	Mubukwanu Kunyanda	Movement for Multi-Party Democracy
Lufwanyama	Chobela Mulilo	Movement for Multi-Party Democracy
Lukashya	John Mulwila	Movement for Multi-Party Democracy
Lukulu East	Alfred Lienda	Movement for Multi-Party Democracy
Lukulu West	Simon Ngombo	Movement for Multi-Party Democracy
Lumezi	Leticia Mwanza	United National Independence Party
Lundazi	Dingiswayo Banda	United National Independence Party
Lunte	Chilufya Kapwepwe	Movement for Multi-Party Democracy
Lupososhi	Simon Mwila	Movement for Multi-Party Democracy
Lusaka Central	Dipak Patel	Movement for Multi-Party Democracy
Magoye	Bates Namuyamba	Movement for Multi-Party Democracy
Malambo	Wezi Kaunda	United National Independence Party
Malole	Emmanuel Kasonde	Movement for Multi-Party Democracy
Mambilima	Chisenga Bunda	Movement for Multi-Party Democracy
Mandevu	Rodger Chongwe	Movement for Multi-Party Democracy
Mangango	Ricky Tumbila	Movement for Multi-Party Democracy
Mansa	Edward Chisha	Movement for Multi-Party Democracy
Mapatizya	Ackson Sejeni	Movement for Multi-Party Democracy
Masaiti	Yona Chilele	Movement for Multi-Party Democracy
Matero	Samuel Miyanda	Movement for Multi-Party Democracy
Mazabuka	Ben Mwiinga	Movement for Multi-Party Democracy
Mbabala	Alfayo Hambayi	Movement for Multi-Party Democracy
Mbala	Derick Chitala	Movement for Multi-Party Democracy
Mfuwe	Paul Lumbi	Movement for Multi-Party Democracy
Milanzi	Joseph Mbewe	United National Independence Party
Mkaika	Josephat Mulenga	United National Independence Party
Mkushi North	Rolf Shenton	Movement for Multi-Party Democracy
Mkushi South	Felix Machiko	Movement for Multi-Party Democracy
Mongu	Akashambatwa Mbikusita-Lewanika	Movement for Multi-Party Democracy
Monze	Suresh Desai	Movement for Multi-Party Democracy
Moomba	Fitzpatrick Chuula	Movement for Multi-Party Democracy
Mpika Central	Guy Scott	Movement for Multi-Party Democracy
Mpongwe	Dawson Lupunga	Movement for Multi-Party Democracy
Mporokoso	Ackim Nkole	Movement for Multi-Party Democracy
Mpulungu	Dean Mung'omba	Movement for Multi-Party Democracy
Msanzala	Levison Mumba	United National Independence Party
Muchinga	Nathan Mungilashi	Movement for Multi-Party Democracy
Mufulira	Fabian Kasonde	Movement for Multi-Party Democracy
Mufumbwe	Ngalande Matiya	Movement for Multi-Party Democracy
Mulobezi	Leonard Subulwa	Movement for Multi-Party Democracy
Mumbwa	Makosonke Hlazo	Movement for Multi-Party Democracy
Munali	Ronald Penza	Movement for Multi-Party Democracy
Mwandi	Kakoma Sefulo	Movement for Multi-Party Democracy
Mwansabombwe	Edward Muonga	Movement for Multi-Party Democracy
Mwembeshi	Edward Shimwandwe	Movement for Multi-Party Democracy
Mwense	Norman Chibamba	Movement for Multi-Party Democracy
Mwinilunga East	David Samanana	Movement for Multi-Party Democracy
Mwinilunga West	John Kalenga	Movement for Multi-Party Democracy
Nakonde	Edith Nawakwi	Movement for Multi-Party Democracy
Nalikwanda	Mufaya Mumbuna	Movement for Multi-Party Democracy
Nalolo	Henry Kabika	Movement for Multi-Party Democracy
Namwala	Lovemore Chulu	Movement for Multi-Party Democracy
Nangoma	Shimaili David Mpamba	Movement for Multi-Party Democracy
Nchanga	Bonface Kawimbe	Movement for Multi-Party Democracy
Nchelenge	Daniel Mutobola	Movement for Multi-Party Democracy
Ndola	Eric Silwamba	Movement for Multi-Party Democracy
Nkana	Barnabas Bungono	Movement for Multi-Party Democracy
Nyimba	Daalick Mapon	United National Independence Party
Pambashe	Remmy Mushota	Movement for Multi-Party Democracy
Pemba	Aaron Muyovwe	Movement for Multi-Party Democracy
Petauke	Lavu Malimba	United National Independence Party
Roan	Vernon Mwaanga	Movement for Multi-Party Democracy
Rufunsa	Bartholomew Seyama	United National Independence Party
Senanga	Inonge Mbikusita-Lewanika	Movement for Multi-Party Democracy
Senga Hill	Mathias Mpande	Movement for Multi-Party Democracy
Serenje	Abdul Hamir	Movement for Multi-Party Democracy
Sesheke	Richard Nganga	Movement for Multi-Party Democracy
Shiwa Ng'andu	Celestino Chibamba	Movement for Multi-Party Democracy
Siavonga	Fredrick Hapunda	Movement for Multi-Party Democracy
Sikongo	Ber Zukas	Movement for Multi-Party Democracy
Sinazongwe	Syacheye Madyenkuku	Movement for Multi-Party Democracy
Sinda	Naphit Phiri	United National Independence Party
Sinjembela	Keli Walubita	Movement for Multi-Party Democracy
Solwezi Central	Humphrey Mulemba	Movement for Multi-Party Democracy
Solwezi East	Shiabyungwe Shengamo	Movement for Multi-Party Democracy
Solwezi West	Bisola Kuliye	Movement for Multi-Party Democracy
Vubwi	Lusian Mwale	United National Independence Party
Wusakile	Chitalu Sampa	Movement for Multi-Party Democracy
Zambezi East	Paul Kapina	Movement for Multi-Party Democracy
Zambezi West	Roy Saviye	United National Independence Party

==== Replacements by by-election ====
Constituency	Original member	Party	By-election date	New member	Party
Luena	Mubukwanu Kunyanda	Movement for Multi-Party Democracy	1992	Simwinji Simwinji	Movement for Multi-Party Democracy
Nkana	Barnabas Bungono	Movement for Multi-Party Democracy	1992	Matilda Chakulya	Movement for Multi-Party Democracy
Chadiza	Shart Banda	United National Independence Party	1992	Panji Kaunda	United National Independence Party
Kafue	Chanda Sosala	Movement for Multi-Party Democracy	1992	Akbar Badat	Movement for Multi-Party Democracy
Rufunsa	Bartholomew Seyama	United National Independence Party		Scholastica Ngoma	Movement for Multi-Party Democracy
Bweengwa	Baldwin Nkumbula	Movement for Multi-Party Democracy	1993	Baldwin Nkumbula	National Party
Chasefu	Stanley Phiri	United National Independence Party	1993	Rhodwell Nyirenda	United National Independence Party
Kalabo	Arthur Wina	Movement for Multi-Party Democracy	1993	Arthur Wina	National Party
Malole	Emmanuel Kasonde	Movement for Multi-Party Democracy	1993	Dismas Kalingeme	Movement for Multi-Party Democracy
Mwansabombwe	Edward Muonga	Movement for Multi-Party Democracy	1993	Josiah Chishala	Movement for Multi-Party Democracy
Mwinilunga West	John Kalenga	Movement for Multi-Party Democracy	1993	Peter Mpashi	Movement for Multi-Party Democracy
Pemba	Aaron Muyovwe	Movement for Multi-Party Democracy	1993	Daniel Buumba	Movement for Multi-Party Democracy
Senanga	Inonge Mbikusita-Lewanika	Movement for Multi-Party Democracy	1993	Inonge Mbikusita-Lewanika	National Party
Solwezi Central	Humphrey Mulemba	Movement for Multi-Party Democracy	1993	Humphrey Mulemba	National Party
Mongu	Akashambatwa Mbikusita-Lewanika	Movement for Multi-Party Democracy		Akashambatwa Mbikusita-Lewanika	National Party
Katombora	Wonder Sikiti	Movement for Multi-Party Democracy		Aggrey Kanchele	Movement for Multi-Party Democracy
Chinsali	Katongo Mulenga	Movement for Multi-Party Democracy	1994	Charles Museba	Movement for Multi-Party Democracy
Chilanga	Collins Hinamanjolo	Movement for Multi-Party Democracy	1994	Morgan Babuwa	Movement for Multi-Party Democracy
Lukashya	John Mulwila	Movement for Multi-Party Democracy	1994	Bernard Mpundu	Movement for Multi-Party Democracy
Lunte	Chilufya Kapwepwe	Movement for Multi-Party Democracy	1994	Donald Musonda	Movement for Multi-Party Democracy
Mufulira	Fabian Kasonde	Movement for Multi-Party Democracy	1994	Kaunda Lembalemba	Movement for Multi-Party Democracy
Mumbwa	Makosonke Hlazo	Movement for Multi-Party Democracy	1994	Donald Chivubwe	Movement for Multi-Party Democracy
Chilubi	Edward Chitungulu	Movement for Multi-Party Democracy	1994	Shisala Mponda	Movement for Multi-Party Democracy
Chikankata	Joshua Lumina	Movement for Multi-Party Democracy	1994		Movement for Multi-Party Democracy
Bweengwa	Baldwin Nkumbula	National Party	1995	Edgar Keembe	Movement for Multi-Party Democracy
Chingola	Ludwing Sondashi	Movement for Multi-Party Democracy	April 1995	Enoch Kavindele	Movement for Multi-Party Democracy

=== Non-elected members ===
Type	Member	Party
Speaker	Robinson Nabulyato	Independent
Nominated	William Harrington	Movement for Multi-Party Democracy
Nominated	Katele Kalumba	Movement for Multi-Party Democracy
Nominated	Kabunda Kayongo	Movement for Multi-Party Democracy
Nominated	Mwami Maunga	Movement for Multi-Party Democracy
Nominated	Godfrey Miyanda	Movement for Multi-Party Democracy
Nominated	Zilole Mumba	Movement for Multi-Party Democracy
Nominated	Hosea Soko	Movement for Multi-Party Democracy
