= List of members of the National Assembly of Zambia (2006–2011) =

The members of the National Assembly of Zambia from 2006 until 2011 were elected on 28 September 2006. Of the 148 members elected on election day, 72 were from the Movement for Multi-Party Democracy, 43 from the Patriotic Front, 26 from the United Democratic Alliance, three from the United Liberal Party and one from the National Democratic Focus, as well as three independents. Elections in two seats, Lupososhi and Kabompo East, were postponed due to the death of candidates, with the MMD winning both seats in by-elections.

== List of members ==
=== Elected members ===
Constituency	Member	Party
Bahati	Besa Chimbaka	Patriotic Front
Bangweulu	Joseph Kasongo	Patriotic Front
Bwacha	Gladys Nyirongo	Movement for Multi-Party Democracy
Bwana Mkubwa	Joseph Zulu	Patriotic Front
Bweengwa	Highvie Hamududu	United Democratic Alliance
Chadiza	Allan Mbewe	Movement for Multi-Party Democracy
Chama North	Todd Chilembo	Movement for Multi-Party Democracy
Chama South	Bornface Nkhata	Movement for Multi-Party Democracy
Chasefu	Chifumu Banda	United Democratic Alliance
Chavuma	Kenneth Konga	Movement for Multi-Party Democracy
Chawama	Violet Sampa-Bredt	Patriotic Front
Chembe	Mwansa Mbulakulima	Movement for Multi-Party Democracy
Chiengi	Katele Kalumba	Movement for Multi-Party Democracy
Chifubu	Benson Bwalya	Patriotic Front
Chifunabuli	Ernest Mwansa	Patriotic Front
Chikankata	Munji Habeenzu	United Democratic Alliance
Chilanga	N’gandu Peter Magande	Movement for Multi-Party Democracy
Chililabombwe	Esther Banda	Patriotic Front
Chilubi	Obius Chisala	Patriotic Front
Chimbamilonga	Brian Sikazwe	Movement for Multi-Party Democracy
Chimwemwe	Willie Nsanda	Patriotic Front
Chingola	Joseph Katema	Patriotic Front
Chinsali	Christopher Mulenga	Patriotic Front
Chipangali	Vincent Mwale	Movement for Multi-Party Democracy
Chipata Central	Lameck Mangani	Movement for Multi-Party Democracy
Chipili	Davies Mwila	Patriotic Front
Chisamba	Moses Muteteka	Movement for Multi-Party Democracy
Chitambo	Nasim-ul Gani Hamir	Movement for Multi-Party Democracy
Choma	George Chazangwe	United Democratic Alliance
Chongwe	Sylvia Masebo	Movement for Multi-Party Democracy
Dundumwenzi	Edgar Singombe	Independent
Feira	Charles Shawa	Movement for Multi-Party Democracy
Gwembe	Brian Ntundu	United Democratic Alliance
Isoka East	Catherine Namugala	Movement for Multi-Party Democracy
Isoka West	Paul Sichamba	Movement for Multi-Party Democracy
Itezhi-Tezhi	Godfrey Beene	United Democratic Alliance
Kabompo East	Ronald Mukuma	Movement for Multi-Party Democracy
Kabompo West	Daniel Kalenga	Movement for Multi-Party Democracy
Kabushi	Lombani Msichili	Patriotic Front
Kabwata	Given Lubinda	Patriotic Front
Kabwe Central	Kayula Kakusa	Movement for Multi-Party Democracy
Kafue	Bradford Machila	Movement for Multi-Party Democracy
Kafulafuta	George Mpombo	Movement for Multi-Party Democracy
Kalabo	Sikwibele Mwapela	Movement for Multi-Party Democracy
Kalomo Central	Request Muntanga	United Democratic Alliance
Kalulushi	Anson Simama	Patriotic Front
Kamfinsa	Michael Nyirenda	Patriotic Front
Kanchibiya	Albert Kanyanyamina	Patriotic Front
Kankoyo	Percy Chanda	Patriotic Front
Kantanshi	Yamfwa Mukanga	Patriotic Front
Kanyama	Henry Mtonga	Patriotic Front
Kaoma Central	Austin Liato	Movement for Multi-Party Democracy
Kapiri Mposhi	Friday Malwa	Movement for Multi-Party Democracy
Kapoche	Nicholas Banda	Movement for Multi-Party Democracy
Kaputa	Mutale Nalumango	Movement for Multi-Party Democracy
Kasama Central	Saviour Chishimba	Patriotic Front
Kasempa	Kabinga Pande	Movement for Multi-Party Democracy
Kasenengwa	Vera Tembo	Movement for Multi-Party Democracy
Katombola	Regina Musokotwane	United Democratic Alliance
Katuba	Jonas Shakafuswa	Movement for Multi-Party Democracy
Kawambwa	Elizabeth Chitika	Patriotic Front
Keembe	Ronald Shikapwasha	Movement for Multi-Party Democracy
Kwacha	Lombe Mulenga	Patriotic Front
Liuwa	Maliwa Kashweka	Movement for Multi-Party Democracy
Livingstone	Sakwiba Sikota	United Liberal Party
Luampa	Mwiya Limata	United Democratic Alliance
Luangeni	Angela Cifire	Movement for Multi-Party Democracy
Luanshya	Jean Phiri-Njovu	Patriotic Front
Luapula	Peter Machungwa	Patriotic Front
Lubansenshi	Lazarous Chota	Patriotic Front
Luena	Charles Milupi	Independent
Lufwanyama	Lwipa Puma	Movement for Multi-Party Democracy
Lukashya	Alfreda Mwamba	Patriotic Front
Lukulu East	Batuke Imenda	United Liberal Party
Lukulu West	Eileen Imbwae	United Liberal Party
Lumezi	Isaac Banda	Movement for Multi-Party Democracy
Lundazi	Mkhondo Lungu	United Democratic Alliance
Lunte	Felix Mutati	Movement for Multi-Party Democracy
Lupososhi	Albert Mulonga	Movement for Multi-Party Democracy
Lusaka Central	Guy Scott	Patriotic Front
Magoye	Bennie Mweemba	United Democratic Alliance
Malambo	Maxwell Mwale	Movement for Multi-Party Democracy
Malole	Emmanuel Munaile	Independent
Mambilima	John Chinyanta	Movement for Multi-Party Democracy
Mandevu	Jean Kapata	Patriotic Front
Mangango	Mwendoi Akakandelwa	Movement for Multi-Party Democracy
Mansa	Chrispine Musosha	Movement for Multi-Party Democracy
Mapatizya	Ackson Sejani	United Democratic Alliance
Masaiti	Gladys Lundwe	Movement for Multi-Party Democracy
Matero	Faustina Bwalya	Patriotic Front
Mazabuka	Gary Nkombo	United Democratic Alliance
Mbabala	Emmanuel Hachipuka	United Democratic Alliance
Mbala	Gaston Sichilima	Movement for Multi-Party Democracy
Mfuwe	Mwimba Malama	Patriotic Front
Milanzi	Chosani Njobvu	United Democratic Alliance
Mkaika	David Phiri	Movement for Multi-Party Democracy
Mkushi North	Lucy Changwe	Movement for Multi-Party Democracy
Mkushi South	Sydney Chisanga	Movement for Multi-Party Democracy
Mongu Central	Joseph Mulyata	Movement for Multi-Party Democracy
Monze	Jack Mwiimbu	United Democratic Alliance
Moomba	Vitalis Mooya	United Democratic Alliance
Mpika Central	Mwansa Kapeya	Patriotic Front
Mpongwe	Gabriel Namulambe	Movement for Multi-Party Democracy
Mporokoso	Maynard Misapa	Movement for Multi-Party Democracy
Mpulungu	Lameck Chibombamilimo	Movement for Multi-Party Democracy
Msanzala	Peter Daka	Movement for Multi-Party Democracy
Muchinga	George Kunda	Movement for Multi-Party Democracy
Mufulira	Marjory Masiye	Patriotic Front
Mufumbwe	Meshack Bonshe	Movement for Multi-Party Democracy
Mulobezi	Michael Mabenga	Movement for Multi-Party Democracy
Mumbwa	Brian Chituwo	Movement for Multi-Party Democracy
Munali	Chilufya Mumbi	Patriotic Front
Mwandi	Michael Liwanga Kaingu	Movement for Multi-Party Democracy
Mwansabombwe	Samuel Chitonge	Patriotic Front
Mwembeshi	Edward Kasoko	United Democratic Alliance
Mwense	Jacob Chongo	Patriotic Front
Mwinilunga East	Stephen Katuka	United Democratic Alliance
Mwinilunga West	Elijah Muchima	Movement for Multi-Party Democracy
Nakonde	Maka Silavwe	Movement for Multi-Party Democracy
Nalikwanda	G. Lungwangwa	Movement for Multi-Party Democracy
Nalolo	Mubita Mwangala	Movement for Multi-Party Democracy
Namwala	Robbie Chizhyuka	United Democratic Alliance
Nangoma	Boyd Hamusonde	United Democratic Alliance
Nchanga	Charles Chimumbwa	Patriotic Front
Nchelenge	Benjamin Mwila	National Democratic Focus
Ndola	Mark Mushili	Patriotic Front
Nkana	Musenge Mwenya	Patriotic Front
Nyimba	Forrie Tembo	Movement for Multi-Party Democracy
Pambashe	Bernard Chishya	Patriotic Front
Pemba	David Matongo	United Democratic Alliance
Petauke	Dora Siliya	Movement for Multi-Party Democracy
Roan	Chishimba Kambwili	Patriotic Front
Rufunsa	Kenneth Chipungu	Movement for Multi-Party Democracy
Senanga Central	Clement Sinyinda	Movement for Multi-Party Democracy
Senga Hill	Kapembwa Simbao	Movement for Multi-Party Democracy
Serenje	Ackimson Banda	Movement for Multi-Party Democracy
Sesheke	Adons Mufalali	Movement for Multi-Party Democracy
Shiwa Ng'andu	Celestino Chibamba	Patriotic Front
Siavonga	Douglas Syakalima	United Democratic Alliance
Sikongo	Mundia Ndalamei	Movement for Multi-Party Democracy
Sinazongwe	Raphael Muyanda	United Democratic Alliance
Sinda	Levy Ngoma	United Democratic Alliance
Sinjembela	Mubika Mubika	Movement for Multi-Party Democracy
Solwezi Central	Benny Tetamashimba	Movement for Multi-Party Democracy
Solwezi East	Richard Taima	Movement for Multi-Party Democracy
Solwezi West	Humphrey Mwanza	Movement for Multi-Party Democracy
Vubwi	Eustarckio Kazonga	Movement for Multi-Party Democracy
Wusakile	Barnabas Chella	Patriotic Front
Zambezi East	Sarah Sayifwanda	Movement for Multi-Party Democracy
Zambezi West	Charles Kakoma	United Democratic Alliance

==== Replacements by by-election ====
Constituency	Original member	Party	By-election date	New member	Party
Kapoche	Nicholas Banda	Movement for Multi-Party Democracy	15 June 2007	Fashion Phiri	Movement for Multi-Party Democracy
Nchanga	Charles Chimumbwa	Patriotic Front	8 November 2007	Wylbur Simuusa	Patriotic Front
Kanyama	Henry Mtonga	Patriotic Front	21 February 2008	Gerry Chanda	Patriotic Front
Milanzi	Chosani Njobvu	United Democratic Alliance	26 June 2008	Reuben Banda	Movement for Multi-Party Democracy
Mwansabombwe	Samuel Chitonge	Patriotic Front	30 October 2008	Samuel Chitonge	Patriotic Front
Ndola	Mark Mushili	Patriotic Front	30 October 2008	Mark Mushili	Patriotic Front
Chitambo	Nasim-ul Gani Hamir	Movement for Multi-Party Democracy	31 August 2009	Solomon Musonda	Movement for Multi-Party Democracy
Kasama Central	Saviour Chishimba	Patriotic Front	15 October 2009	Geoffrey Mwamba	Patriotic Front
Solwezi Central	Benny Tetamashimba	Movement for Multi-Party Democracy	19 November 2009	Watson Lumba	United Party for National Development
Mufumbwe	Meshack Bonshe	Movement for Multi-Party Democracy	29 April 2010	Elliot Kamondo	United Party for National Development
Milanzi	Reuben Banda	Movement for Multi-Party Democracy	29 April 2010	Whiteson Banda	Movement for Multi-Party Democracy
Luena	Charles Milupi	Independent	5 August 2010	Charles Milupi	Alliance for Democracy and Development
Chifubu	Benson Bwalya	Patriotic Front	5 August 2010	Berina Kawandami	Patriotic Front
Mpulungu	Lameck Chibombamilimo	Movement for Multi-Party Democracy	25 October 2010	Given Mung'omba	Movement for Multi-Party Democracy
Chilanga	N’gandu Peter Magande	Movement for Multi-Party Democracy	25 October 2010	Cosmas Moono	United Party for National Development
Mporokoso	Maynard Misapa	Movement for Multi-Party Democracy	3 March 2011	Maynard Misapa	Patriotic Front

=== Non-elected members ===
Type	Member	Party
Speaker	Amusaa Mwanamwambwa	Independent
