= 1991 Zambian general election by constituency =

The 1991 general election in Zambia saw the Movement for Multiparty Democracy defeat the ruling United National Independence Party in both presidential and National Assembly polls.

== Presidential results by constituency ==
Constituency	Electorate	Turnout %	Frederick Chiluba (MMD)		Kenneth Kaunda (UNIP)	
Constituency	Electorate	Turnout %	Votes	%	Votes	%
CENTRAL PROVINCE
1. Chisamba	17,087	27.8	3,117	68.3	1,447	31.7
2. Katuba	14,920	41.8	4,185	68.9	1,892	31.1
3. Keembe	25,497	31.6	5,142	65.8	2,678	34.2
4. Bwacha	30,963	49.9	11,578	77.3	3,408	22.7
5. Kabwe	41,148	48.3	16,939	87.1	2,501	12.9
6. Kapiri Mposhi	25,523	31.6	6,125	78.3	1,693	21.7
7. Mkushi North	20,130	32.5	3,668	58.7	2,579	41.3
8. Mkushi South	22,931	27.1	3,657	62.1	2,229	37.9
9. Mumbwa	16,505	39.2	4,696	74.8	1,580	25.2
10. Mwembeshi	14,532	40.9	4,524	77.7	1,300	22.3
11. Nangoma	13,417	35.2	3,760	82.7	786	17.3
12. Chitambo	9,002	31.8	1,958	72.4	746	27.6
13. Muchinga	8,671	38.7	1,865	57.2	1,396	42.8
14. Serenje	11,104	42.1	3,141	70.0	1,346	30.0

== National Assembly results by constituency ==
Constituency	Registered voters	Turnout	Candidate	Party	Votes	%
Central Province (14 seats)
1. CHISAMBA	17,087	27.2%	M.R. Musakabantu	Movement for Multiparty Democracy	2,976	67.0
1. CHISAMBA	17,087	27.2%	Robinson Manunga	United National Independence Party	1,464	33.0
2. KATUBA	14,920	41.6%	Gilbert Mululu	Movement for Multiparty Democracy	4,062	67.2
2. KATUBA	14,920	41.6%	Richard C. Kasanda	United National Independence Party	1,984	32.8
3. KEEMBE	25,497	31.3%	Oma Saul Chipwayambok	Movement for Multiparty Democracy	5,022	64.9
3. KEEMBE	25,497	31.3%	K. Godwin Chinkuli	United National Independence Party	2,717	35.1
4. BWACHA	30,963	48.8%	Wendy Sinkala	Movement for Multiparty Democracy	11,017	75.7
4. BWACHA	30,963	48.8%	Richard K. Banda	United National Independence Party	3,303	22.7
4. BWACHA	30,963	48.8%	Dick J. Nankulo	National Democratic Party	234	1.6
5. KABWE	41,148	47.8%	Simon P. Tembo	Movement for Multiparty Democracy	16,592	86.6
5. KABWE	41,148	47.8%	Andrew M. Dingwall	United National Independence Party	2,559	13.4
6. KAPIRI MPOSHI	25,523	31.5%	Gabriel K. Maka	Movement for Multiparty Democracy	6,083	77.9
6. KAPIRI MPOSHI	25,523	31.5%	Kingsley K. Phiri	United National Independence Party	1,727	22.1
7. MKUSHI NORTH	20,130	31.9%	Rolf E. Shenton	Movement for Multiparty Democracy	3,549	58.2
7. MKUSHI NORTH	20,130	31.9%	Bennie M. Lupashi	United National Independence Party	2,553	41.8
8. MKUSHI SOUTH	22,931	27.0%	Felix W.M. Machiko	Movement for Multiparty Democracy	3,550	60.5
8. MKUSHI SOUTH	22,931	27.0%	Gabriel Katungu	United National Independence Party	2,318	39.5
9. MWEMBEZHI	14,532	40.8%	Edward Shimwandwe	Movement for Multiparty Democracy	4,389	75.9
9. MWEMBEZHI	14,532	40.8%	Yonnah L. Shimonde	United National Independence Party	1,390	24.1
10. MUMBWA	16,505	39.1%	Makosonke S. Hlazo	Movement for Multiparty Democracy	4,635	74.2
10. MUMBWA	16,505	39.1%	Joel Chivwema	United National Independence Party	1,611	25.8
11. NANGOMA	13,417	35.2%	Shimaila D. Mpamba	Movement for Multiparty Democracy	3,640	80.2
11. NANGOMA	13,417	35.2%	Kennedy M. Shepande	United National Independence Party	900	19.8
12. CHITAMBO	9,002	31.9%	Kapilya Lupiya	Movement for Multiparty Democracy	1,888	75.1
12. CHITAMBO	9,002	31.9%	Justin J. Mukando	United National Independence Party	759	24.9
13. MUCHINGA	8,671	38.1%	Nathan Mungilashi	Movement for Multiparty Democracy	1,753	55.1
13. MUCHINGA	8,671	38.1%	Musonda Chunga	United National Independence Party	1,427	44.9
14. SERENJE	11,104	26.6%	Mahomed A.H. Hamir	Movement for Multiparty Democracy	1,391	50.9
14. SERENJE	11,104	26.6%	Chibale K. Chime	United National Independence Party	1,347	49.2
Copperbelt Province (22 seats)
15. CHILILABOMBWE	25,490	56.8%	Sikota Wina	Movement for Multiparty Democracy	12,118	85.8
15. CHILILABOMBWE	25,490	56.8%	Chanda P. Kabuswe	United National Independence Party	2,011	14.2
16. CHINGOLA	39,554	55.0%	Dr Ludwing S. Sondashi	Movement for Multiparty Democracy	17,736	84.3
16. CHINGOLA	39,554	55.0%	Enock P. Kavindele	United National Independence Party	3,308	15.7
17. NCHANGA	34,147	63.4%	Bonface M. Kawimbe	Movement for Multiparty Democracy	20,544	96.8
17. NCHANGA	34,147	63.4%	John C. Mupeta	United National Independence Party	684	3.2
18. KALULUSHI	29,251	55.4%	Bornad K. Sekwila	Movement for Multiparty Democracy	13,514	85.8
18. KALULUSHI	29,251	55.4%	Winston K.C. Kamwana	United National Independence Party	2,244	14.2
19. CHIMWEMWE	34,409	51.7%	Henry S. Kristafor	Movement for Multiparty Democracy	15,055	89.5
19. CHIMWEMWE	34,409	51.7%	Friday Sikazwe	United National Independence Party	1,766	10.5
20. KAMFINSA	23,088	45.2%	Lemmy Chipili	Movement for Multiparty Democracy	8,061	82.0
20. KAMFINSA	23,088	45.2%	Noah Manase	United National Independence Party	1,639	16.7
20. KAMFINSA	23,088	45.2%	Chipawa J. Sakulanda	National Democratic Alliance	133	1.4
21. KWACHA	33,459	57.2%	Newstead L. Zimba	Movement for Multiparty Democracy	16,829	90.2
21. KWACHA	33,459	57.2%	Ernest C. Kasula	United National Independence Party	1,834	9.8
22. NKANA	28,453	57.0%	Barnabas C. Bungoni	Movement for Multiparty Democracy	14,761	92.3
22. NKANA	28,453	57.0%	Noel J. Mvula	United National Independence Party	1,224	7.7
23. WUSAKILE	28,052	57.0%	Chitalu M. Sampa	Movement for Multiparty Democracy	14,025	90.5
23. WUSAKILE	28,052	57.0%	Denis M. Katilungu	United National Independence Party	1,154	7.5
23. WUSAKILE	28,052	57.0%	Maurice S. Kabwe	Independent	188	1.2
23. WUSAKILE	28,052	57.0%	Muzanga S. Chingoyi	Independent	122	0.8
24. LUANSHYA	33,700	49.6%	Benjamin Mwila	Movement for Multiparty Democracy	14,720	89.7
24. LUANSHYA	33,700	49.6%	Rennard A. Mpundu	United National Independence Party	1,401	8.5
24. LUANSHYA	33,700	49.6%	Maxwell K. Mwamba	National Democratic Alliance	298	1.8
25. ROAN	25,240	58.2%	Vernon J. Mwaanga	Movement for Multiparty Democracy	13,853	95.4
25. ROAN	25,240	58.2%	Moses K. Mwachindalo	United National Independence Party	661	4.6
26. KANKOYO	19,813	55.4%	Kangwa Nsuluka	Movement for Multiparty Democracy	9,980	93.1
26. KANKOYO	19,813	55.4%	Jack D. Kopolo	United National Independence Party	734	6.9
27. KANTANSHI	24,826	58.4%	Elias M.C. Chipimo	Movement for Multiparty Democracy	13,334	92.8
27. KANTANSHI	24,826	58.4%	David T. Nkhata	United National Independence Party	1,020	7.2
28. MUFULIRA	24,603	53.0%	Fabian Kasonde	Movement for Multiparty Democracy	11,619	91.3
28. MUFULIRA	24,603	53.0%	Mary Chisala	United National Independence Party	1,112	8.7
29. KAFULAFUTA	13,415	24.9%	William C. Matutu	Movement for Multiparty Democracy	2,193	69.8
29. KAFULAFUTA	13,415	24.9%	George W. Mpombo	United National Independence Party	951	30.2
30. LUFWANYAMA	16,675	31.7%	Chobela M. Mulilo	Movement for Multiparty Democracy	4,233	84.6
30. LUFWANYAMA	16,675	31.7%	Jason K. Balashi	United National Independence Party	773	15.4
31. MASAITI	16,507	30.6%	Yona S. Chilele	Movement for Multiparty Democracy	3,983	82.9
31. MASAITI	16,507	30.6%	Alick T. Mpengula	United National Independence Party	822	17.1
32. MPONGWE	12,997	29.9%	Dawson L. Lupunga	Movement for Multiparty Democracy	2,754	73.6
32. MPONGWE	12,997	29.9%	Cosmas Chibabda	United National Independence Party	987	26.4
33. BWANA MKUBWA	33,492	45.0%	Andrew E. Kashita	Movement for Multiparty Democracy	13,230	90.8
33. BWANA MKUBWA	33,492	45.0%	Lawrence B.W. Phiri	United National Independence Party	1,344	9.2
34. CHIFUBU	28,300	48.7%	Levy P. Mwanawasa	Movement for Multiparty Democracy	11,865	88.6
34. CHIFUBU	28,300	48.7%	Dinesh Sharma	United National Independence Party	1,532	11.4
35. KABUSHI	35,832	48.8%	Abraham Makola	Movement for Multiparty Democracy	15,231	89.1
35. KABUSHI	35,832	48.8%	Levi Mbulo	United National Independence Party	1,551	9.1
35. KABUSHI	35,832	48.8%	Elias M. Kaenga	National Democratic Alliance	159	0.9
35. KABUSHI	35,832	48.8%	Kangwa Mutale	National Democratic Party	158	0.9
36. NDOLA	41,306	43.9%	Eric Silwamba	Movement for Multiparty Democracy	15,402	85.6
36. NDOLA	41,306	43.9%	Pat B. Puta	United National Independence Party	2,284	12.7
36. NDOLA	41,306	43.9%	Evans Silungwe	National Democratic Alliance	197	1.1
36. NDOLA	41,306	43.9%	Lawrence Chanda	Democratic Party	120	0.7
Eastern Province (19 seats)
37. CHADIZA	14,635	56.9%	Shart L. Banda	United National Independence Party	6,332	80.3
37. CHADIZA	14,635	56.9%	Ben Shawa	Movement for Multiparty Democracy	1,549	19.7
38. VUBWI	10,628	58.6%	Lusian O. Mwale	United National Independence Party	5,651	93.4
38. VUBWI	10,628	58.6%	Ferdinand Jere	Movement for Multiparty Democracy	398	6.6
39. CHAMA NORTH	9,400	46.7%	Lightwell M. Sibale	United National Independence Party	3,350	78.5
39. CHAMA NORTH	9,400	46.7%	Clifford L. Nkhata	Movement for Multiparty Democracy	919	21.5
40. CHAMA SOUTH	9,627	44.2%	Cuthbert C. Ng'uni	United National Independence Party	3,171	74.42
40. CHAMA SOUTH	9,627	44.2%	Lightwell H. Mtonga	Movement for Multiparty Democracy	1,006	23.61
41. CHIPANGALI	22,331	39.5%	Geresom S. Nkhoma	United National Independence Party	6,256	75.9
41. CHIPANGALI	22,331	39.5%	James S.M. Mazyopa	Movement for Multiparty Democracy	1,441	17.5
41. CHIPANGALI	22,331	39.5%	Wilmot Y. Tembo	Independent	547	6.6
42. CHIPATA	28,996	46.5%	Winwright K. Ngondo	United National Independence Party	7,491	58.9
42. CHIPATA	28,996	46.5%	Andrew Banda	Movement for Multiparty Democracy	5,218	41.1
43. KASENENGWA	27,190	40.1%	Patrick M. Mvunga	United National Independence Party	7,516	72.2
43. KASENENGWA	27,190	40.1%	Bartholomew Banda	Movement for Multiparty Democracy	2,889	27.8
44. LUANGENI	22,822	39.4%	Johnstone Jere	United National Independence Party	4,990	60.8
44. LUANGENI	22,822	39.4%	Abisa K.C. Ngoma	Movement for Multiparty Democracy	3,222	39.2
45. MILANZI	16,849	58.8%	Joseph G.C. Mbewe	United National Independence Party	7,247	80.3
45. MILANZI	16,849	58.8%	Dr A. Chosani Njobvu	Movement for Multiparty Democracy	1,778	19.7
46. MKAIKA	16,849	65.5%	Josephat Y. Mulenga	United National Independence Party	6,013	59.2
46. MKAIKA	16,849	65.5%	H. Eric Whightman	Movement for Multiparty Democracy	3,801	37.4
46. MKAIKA	16,849	65.5%	Alexander Banda	Independent	340	3.3
47. SINDA	20,085	51.6%	Naphitali M. Phiri	United National Independence Party	6,773	72.5
47. SINDA	20,085	51.6%	Charles A. Saka	Movement for Multiparty Democracy	2,570	27.5
48. CHASEFU	20,165	66.6%	B.S. Junchwa	United National Independence Party	11,274	94.9
48. CHASEFU	20,165	66.6%	Gibson R. Zimba	Movement for Multiparty Democracy	604	5.1
49. LUMEZI	17,985	47.2%	Mrs Leticia Mwanza	United National Independence Party	5,722	69.7
49. LUMEZI	17,985	47.2%	Bina Moyo	Independent	2,493	30.3
50. LUNDAZI	27,447	60.0%	Dingiswayo H. Banda	United National Independence Party	12,874	81.9
50. LUNDAZI	27,447	60.0%	Bizwayo N. Nkunika	Movement for Multiparty Democracy	2,836	18.1
51. MALAMBO	12,981	51.3%	Major Wezi Kaunda	United National Independence Party	4,887	76.7
51. MALAMBO	12,981	51.3%	Whitson H. Banda	Movement for Multiparty Democracy	1,483	23.3
52. NYIMBA	18,644	45.1%	Alick L. Maponda	United National Independence Party	5,850	73.1
52. NYIMBA	18,644	45.1%	Roselyn Tembo	Movement for Multiparty Democracy	2,148	16.9
53. KAPOCHE	26,229	45.6%	Rev Ben L. Zulu	United National Independence Party	8,336	75.4
53. KAPOCHE	26,229	45.6%	Alfred Chioza	Movement for Multiparty Democracy	2,714	24.6
54. MSANZALA	10,624	51.5%	Levison A. Mumba	United National Independence Party	3,395	65.6
54. MSANZALA	10,624	51.5%	Edward L.A. Banda	Movement for Multiparty Democracy	1,782	34.4
55. PETAUKE	27,752	48.2%	Lavu Malimba	United National Independence Party	7,981	67.1
55. PETAUKE	27,752	48.2%	Clement Mwanza	Movement for Multiparty Democracy	3,905	32.9
Luapula Province (14 seats)
56. KAWAMBWA	9,412	50.5%	Joseph M. Mpundu	Movement for Multiparty Democracy	4,267	90.9
56. KAWAMBWA	9,412	50.5%	Johnston Kabwe	United National Independence Party	429	9.1
57. MWANSABOMBWE	10,834	43.7%	Edward Nvonga	Movement for Multiparty Democracy	3,864	83.9
57. MWANSABOMBWE	10,834	43.7%	Peter K. Chanshi	United National Independence Party	740	16.1
58. PAMBASHE	7,551	55.2%	Dr Remmy G. Mushota	Movement for Multiparty Democracy	3,589	88.3
58. PAMBASHE	7,551	55.2%	Francis T. Kapansa	United National Independence Party	477	11.7
59. BAHATI	17,252	46.7%	Valentine C.N. Kayope	Movement for Multiparty Democracy	6,805	86.0
59. BAHATI	17,252	46.7%	Simon C. Kalaba	United National Independence Party	1,110	14.0
60. CHEMBE	14,087	37.7%	Daton M. Sokontwe	Movement for Multiparty Democracy	4,474	88.3
60. CHEMBE	14,087	37.7%	Fanwell C. Sakeni	United National Independence Party	592	11.7
61. MANSA	24,082	46.8%	Edward B. Chisha	Movement for Multiparty Democracy	9,021	82.0
61. MANSA	24,082	46.8%	Dr Simon C. Mwewa	United National Independence Party	1,981	18.0
62. CHIPILI	6,251	35.8%	Mpondo M. Chindtoloma	Movement for Multiparty Democracy	1,228	73.7
62. CHIPILI	6,251	35.8%	Enock Mwewa	United National Independence Party	439	26.3
63. MAMBILIMA	9,738	51.1%	Chisenga Bunda	Movement for Multiparty Democracy	4,216	86.5
63. MAMBILIMA	9,738	51.1%	Wynter K. Chabala	United National Independence Party	659	13.5
64. MWENSE	14,763	45.1%	Norman K.M. Chibamba	Movement for Multiparty Democracy	5,723	87.2
64. MWENSE	14,763	45.1%	Kunda Kalifunga	United National Independence Party	838	12.8
65. CHIENGI	21,336	39.4%	Ephraim Chibwe	Movement for Multiparty Democracy	7,410	90.0
65. CHIENGI	21,336	39.4%	Maxwell K. Lufoma	United National Independence Party	822	10.0
66. NCHELENGE	16,175	46.6%	Daniel M. Mutobola	Movement for Multiparty Democracy	6,386	86.2
66. NCHELENGE	16,175	46.6%	Mukanja Kainga	United National Independence Party	1,026	13.8
67. BANGEWEULU	4,401	63.0%	Joseph C. Kasongo	United National Independence Party	1,237	54.6
67. BANGEWEULU	4,401	63.0%	Rev Daniel C. Pule	Movement for Multiparty Democracy	1,030	45.4
68. CHIFUNABULI	20,527	54.6%	Ernest C. Mwansa	Movement for Multiparty Democracy	10,153	93.6
68. CHIFUNABULI	20,527	54.6%	Anthony D. Ndalama	United National Independence Party	689	6.4
69. LUAPULA	6,974	54.6%	Dr Peter D. Machungwa	Movement for Multiparty Democracy	3,140	87.3
69. LUAPULA	6,974	54.6%	Augustine B.C. Katotobwe	United National Independence Party	458	12.7
Lusaka Province (12 seats)
70. KAFUE	29,925	46.3%	Lt. Col. Chanda E. Sosala	Movement for Multiparty Democracy	10,596	78.4
70. KAFUE	29,925	46.3%	Joe Shabusale	United National Independence Party	2,918	21.6
71. FEIRA	6,729	49.1%	A. Stanslous Nyamukandek	United National Independence Party	1,744	55.8
71. FEIRA	6,729	49.1%	Joseph J. Mulekwa	Movement for Multiparty Democracy	1,381	44.2
72. CHILANGA	14,429	44.9%	Collins Hinamanjolo	Movement for Multiparty Democracy	4,118	65.8
72. CHILANGA	14,429	44.9%	Phillipot E. Kang'ombe	United National Independence Party	2,145	34.2
73. CHONGWE	24,612	36.1%	Gibson Nkausu	Movement for Multiparty Democracy	5,458	64.4
73. CHONGWE	24,612	36.1%	Elizabeth C. Mulenje	United National Independence Party	3,018	35.6
74. RUFUNSA	7,942	29.9%	Bartholomew Seyama	United National Independence Party	1,160	51.3
74. RUFUNSA	7,942	29.9%	Dr Nyangu S. Chipungu	Movement for Multiparty Democracy	1,103	48.7
75. CHAWAMA	40,127	45.5%	Christon Tembo	Movement for Multiparty Democracy	13,396	76.1
75. CHAWAMA	40,127	45.5%	Donald Chilufya	United National Independence Party	3,601	20.4
75. CHAWAMA	40,127	45.5%	Capt. John Mwamulima	Independent	616	3.5
76. KABWATA	31,446	51.3%	Michael C. Sata	Movement for Multiparty Democracy	12,711	80.3
76. KABWATA	31,446	51.3%	Lt. Col. Henry N. Muyoba	United National Independence Party	2,958	18.7
76. KABWATA	31,446	51.3%	Webley S. Mwanamungela	National Democratic Party	160	1.0
77. KANYAMA	34,823	41.0%	Marriam M. Nyanga	Movement for Multiparty Democracy	10,176	73.7
77. KANYAMA	34,823	41.0%	Godwin Y. Mumba	United National Independence Party	3,634	26.3
78. LUSAKA CENTRAL	36,155	47.9%	Dipak K.A. Patel	Movement for Multiparty Democracy	13,187	77.3
78. LUSAKA CENTRAL	36,155	47.9%	James B. Banda	United National Independence Party	3,677	21.6
78. LUSAKA CENTRAL	36,155	47.9%	Francis A. Muyobo	National Democratic Party	192	1.1
79. MANDEVU	61,587	43.4%	Dr Rodger M.A. Chongwe	Movement for Multiparty Democracy	19,491	75.9
79. MANDEVU	61,587	43.4%	Teddy N. Sakala	United National Independence Party	4,986	19.4
79. MANDEVU	61,587	43.4%	Yona E. Phiri	National Democratic Alliance	1,206	4.7
80. MATERO	55,351	47.0%	Samuel S. Miyanda	Movement for Multiparty Democracy	19,633	77.6
80. MATERO	55,351	47.0%	Raymond M. Handahu	United National Independence Party	5,014	19.8
80. MATERO	55,351	47.0%	Bornface Mubuso	Independent	643	2.5
81. MUNALI	52,654	46.4%	Ronald Penza	Movement for Multiparty Democracy	19,580	82.3
81. MUNALI	52,654	46.4%	Rupiah B. Banda	United National Independence Party	4,218	17.7
Northern Province (21 seats)
82. CHILUBI	19,372	48.9%	Edward S. Chitungulu	Movement for Multiparty Democracy	7,965	87.9
82. CHILUBI	19,372	48.9%	Rabbison M. Chongo	United National Independence Party	1,101	12.1
83. CHINSALI	16,887	49.3%	Miss Katongo Mulenga	Movement for Multiparty Democracy	6,673	82.6
83. CHINSALI	16,887	49.3%	Dr Francis Kaunda	United National Independence Party	1,410	17.4
84. SHIWANG'ANDU	13,235	45.3%	Kapolyo C. Chibamba	Movement for Multiparty Democracy	4,565	83.3
84. SHIWANG'ANDU	13,235	45.3%	Major Mutupa M. Mbulo	Independent	505	9.2
84. SHIWANG'ANDU	13,235	45.3%	Humphrey Musona	United National Independence Party	411	7.5
85. ISOKA EAST	14,603	48.1%	Goodwell Ng'ambi	United National Independence Party	4,718	69.9
85. ISOKA EAST	14,603	48.1%	Robert K. Sichinga	Movement for Multiparty Democracy	2,036	30.1
86. ISOKA WEST	15,278	39.6%	G. Sakala Sikanyika	Movement for Multiparty Democracy	3,570	63.6
86. ISOKA WEST	15,278	39.6%	Weston E. Siame	United National Independence Party	2,040	36.4
87. NAKONDE	13,488	48.0%	Edith Z. Nawakwi	Movement for Multiparty Democracy	4,595	76.1
87. NAKONDE	13,488	48.0%	James Singoyi	United National Independence Party	1,441	23.9
88. CHIMBAMILONGA	10,195	35.8%	Samuel Mukupa	Movement for Multiparty Democracy	3,101	86.8
88. CHIMBAMILONGA	10,195	35.8%	Goldring H. Chimbilimbili	United National Independence Party	471	13.2
89. KAPUTA	11,099	32.0%	Langstone Kapisha	Movement for Multiparty Democracy	2,243	68.5
89. KAPUTA	11,099	32.0%	Kingfred Chikalipa	United National Independence Party	1,033	31.5
90. KASAMA	27,680	47.2%	Daniel Y.B. Kapapa	Movement for Multiparty Democracy	11,674	91.4
90. KASAMA	27,680	47.2%	Symphoro K. Chomba	United National Independence Party	1,101	8.6
91. LUKASHYA	28,088	35.0%	Dr John M. Mulwila	Movement for Multiparty Democracy	9,025	95.0
91. LUKASHYA	28,088	35.0%	Francis Mwamba	United National Independence Party	475	5.0
92. MALOLE	23,088	56.0%	Emmanuel Kasonde	Movement for Multiparty Democracy	12,036	96.3
92. MALOLE	23,088	56.0%	Francis Bwalya	United National Independence Party	259	2.1
92. MALOLE	23,088	56.0%	Remmie K. Chikonkolo	Independent	202	1.6
93. LUBANSENSHI	11,815	46.6%	Paul M. Chapuswike	Movement for Multiparty Democracy	4,608	87.3
93. LUBANSENSHI	11,815	46.6%	Eugine K. Mulenga	United National Independence Party	669	12.7
94. LUPOSOSHI	11,433	43.7%	Simon A. Mwila	Movement for Multiparty Democracy	4,274	90.4
94. LUPOSOSHI	11,433	43.7%	Antanasho Kabaso	United National Independence Party	455	9.6
95. MBALA	22,090	36.1%	Derick Chitala	Movement for Multiparty Democracy	6,034	78.4
95. MBALA	22,090	36.1%	Howard F.E. Silanda	United National Independence Party	1,667	21.6
96. MPULUNGU	16,314	37.3%	Dean H. Mung'omba	Movement for Multiparty Democracy	4,657	79.2
96. MPULUNGU	16,314	37.3%	Kerrie J.V. Maluti	United National Independence Party	1,224	20.8
97. SENGA HILL	15,027	44.1%	Dr Mathias M. Mpande	Movement for Multiparty Democracy	5,708	88.8
97. SENGA HILL	15,027	44.1%	Anderson K. Simwinga	United National Independence Party	722	11.2
98. KACHIBIYA	14,647	46.6%	Isaiah N. Ng'uni	Movement for Multiparty Democracy	6,159	94.1
98. KACHIBIYA	14,647	46.6%	Delux C. Chiunda	United National Independence Party	388	5.9
99. MFUWE	8,081	42.1%	Paul N. Lumbi	Movement for Multiparty Democracy	2,770	84.5
99. MFUWE	8,081	42.1%	Frederick N. Chomba	United National Independence Party	510	15.5
100. MPIKA CENTRAL	17,300	51.7%	Dr Guy L. Scott	Movement for Multiparty Democracy	7,942	91.2
100. MPIKA CENTRAL	17,300	51.7%	Evaristo M. Mutale	United National Independence Party	762	8.8
101. LUNTE	11,309	40.8%	Mrs Chilufya Kapwepwe	Movement for Multiparty Democracy	4,093	90.8
101. LUNTE	11,309	40.8%	Michael K. Bwalya	United National Independence Party	416	9.2
102. MPOROKOSO	9,012	42.0%	Ackim Nkole	Movement for Multiparty Democracy	2,920	79.2
102. MPOROKOSO	9,012	42.0%	Kasonde Mwamba	United National Independence Party	723	19.6
102. MPOROKOSO	9,012	42.0%	David Kalungu	Independent	43	1.2
North-Western Province (12 seats)
103. CHAVUMA	9,998	52.6%	Benard N. Fumbelo	United National Independence Party	2,670	51.1
103. CHAVUMA	9,998	52.6%	William M. Chipango	Movement for Multiparty Democracy	2,550	48.9
104. KABOMBO EAST	9,998	42.9%	Rev Anosh Chipawa	Movement for Multiparty Democracy	2,550	60.9
104. KABOMBO EAST	9,998	42.9%	E. Musole Kanyungulu	United National Independence Party	1,637	39.1
105. KABOMPO WEST	12,021	44.1%	Mathews Makayi	United National Independence Party	3,023	58.6
105. KABOMPO WEST	12,021	44.1%	J. Stanley Chikwenda	Movement for Multiparty Democracy	2,139	41.4
106. KASEMPA	14,232	22.0%	Patrick Kafumukache	Movement for Multiparty Democracy	2,139	71.6
106. KASEMPA	14,232	22.0%	Benson M. Kasempa	United National Independence Party	848	28.4
107. MUFUMBWE	9,776	48.0%	Ngalande Matiya	Movement for Multiparty Democracy	2,537	56.6
107. MUFUMBWE	9,776	48.0%	Muzungu K. Mulondwe	United National Independence Party	1,943	43.4
108. MWINILUNGA	16,825	40.5%	David K. Samanana	Movement for Multiparty Democracy	3,338	50.6
108. MWINILUNGA	16,825	40.5%	Barnabas Ntambo	Independent	1,675	25.4
108. MWINILUNGA	16,825	40.5%	Fines Bulawayo	United National Independence Party	1,364	20.7
108. MWINILUNGA	16,825	40.5%	Smith Kalabi	Independent	216	3.3
108. MWINILUNGA	16,825	40.5%	Simon Nyamboi	Independent	0	0.0
109. MWINILUNGA WEST	17,579	48.2%	John M. Kalenga	Movement for Multiparty Democracy	7,360	86.9
109. MWINILUNGA WEST	17,579	48.2%	Alina Nyikosa	United National Independence Party	1,113	13.1
110. SOLWEZI CENTRAL	19,082	39.8%	Humphery Mulemba	Movement for Multiparty Democracy	6,060	82.8
110. SOLWEZI CENTRAL	19,082	39.8%	Melliam Sebente	United National Independence Party	1,258	17.2
111. SOLWEZI EAST	13,315	27.2%	Shiabyungwe Shengamo	Movement for Multiparty Democracy	2,600	77.3
111. SOLWEZI EAST	13,315	27.2%	Philemon B. Mukabe	United National Independence Party	765	22.7
112. SOLWEZI WEST	15,621	31.1%	Bisola K.K. Kuliye	Movement for Multiparty Democracy	3,735	80.6
112. SOLWEZI WEST	15,621	31.1%	Elias W. Katambi	United National Independence Party	805	17.4
112. SOLWEZI WEST	15,621	31.1%	Gilbert Wisamba	Independent	96	2.1
113. ZAMBEZI EAST	16,455	52.0%	Paul K. Kapina	Movement for Multiparty Democracy	5,789	69.2
113. ZAMBEZI EAST	16,455	52.0%	Jones K. Makayi	United National Independence Party	2,579	30.8
114. ZAMBEZI WEST	6,217	38.5%	Roy K. Saviye	United National Independence Party	1,501	64.3
114. ZAMBEZI WEST	6,217	38.5%	Rodger C. Sakuhuka	Movement for Multiparty Democracy	834	35.7
Southern Province (19 seats)
115. CHOMBA	21,239	48.8%	Siamujay E.K. Siamukayumbu	Movement for Multiparty Democracy	7,987	79.5
115. CHOMBA	21,239	48.8%	Daniel Munkombwe	United National Independence Party	2,059	20.5
116. MBABALA	15,307	44.6%	Alfayo S. Hambayi	Movement for Multiparty Democracy	5,683	85.6
116. MBABALA	15,307	44.6%	Austin Halubobya	United National Independence Party	953	14.4
117. PEMBA	21,259	47.2%	Aaron Muyovwe	Movement for Multiparty Democracy	8,350	85.6
117. PEMBA	21,259	47.2%	Vianney J. Chidyaka	United National Independence Party	1,022	10.5
117. PEMBA	21,259	47.2%	Simon M. Hantuba	Independent	384	3.9
118. GWEMBE	10,424	40.9%	Jacob B.M. Kantina	Movement for Multiparty Democracy	3,362	82.0
118. GWEMBE	10,424	40.9%	Bernard M. Hanyimbo	United National Independence Party	736	18.0
119. DUNDUMWENZE	13,377	26.7%	Myers Maingalila	Movement for Multiparty Democracy	2,878	83.7
119. DUNDUMWENZE	13,377	26.7%	Jonathan S. Sing'ombe	United National Independence Party	561	16.3
120. KALOMO	19,773	38.8%	Elias M. Miyanda	Movement for Multiparty Democracy	5,853	78.8
120. KALOMO	19,773	38.8%	Redson S. Kumalo	United National Independence Party	1,577	21.2
121. KATOMBOLA	16,756	31.4%	Wonder M. Sikiti	Movement for Multiparty Democracy	4,523	90.8
121. KATOMBOLA	16,756	31.4%	Goliath M. Sikute	United National Independence Party	457	9.2
122. MAPATIZYA	11,478	59.1%	Ackson Sejeni	Movement for Multiparty Democracy	5,570	86.8
122. MAPATIZYA	11,478	59.1%	Kaami Simalimbu	United National Independence Party	848	13.2
123. LIVINGSTONE	37,291	51.6%	Peter H. Muunga	Movement for Multiparty Democracy	14,711	78.1
123. LIVINGSTONE	37,291	51.6%	Kebby S.K. Musokotwanne	United National Independence Party	3,246	17.2
123. LIVINGSTONE	37,291	51.6%	Daniel Lisulo	Independent	881	4.7
124. CHIKANKATA	17,703	42.3%	Joshua M. Lumina	Movement for Multiparty Democracy	6,197	85.0
124. CHIKANKATA	17,703	42.3%	Moonga H. Chiputa	United National Independence Party	1,096	15.0
125. MAGOYE	16,222	49.1%	Bates Namuyamba	Movement for Multiparty Democracy	6,460	83.7
125. MAGOYE	16,222	49.1%	Franclin Malawo	United National Independence Party	1,255	16.3
126. MAZABUKA	31,523	39.0%	Ben H.M. Mwiinga	Movement for Multiparty Democracy	9,268	77.7
126. MAZABUKA	31,523	39.0%	Tom E. Sichone	United National Independence Party	2,657	22.3
127. BWEENGWA	13,914	52.0%	Baldwin Nkumbula	Movement for Multiparty Democracy	5,968	83.9
127. BWEENGWA	13,914	52.0%	Gladson C. Maungila	United National Independence Party	1,086	15.3
127. BWEENGWA	13,914	52.0%	Jonathan Chilangi	National Democratic Party	59	0.8
128. MONZE	27,309	48.0%	Suresh Desai	Movement for Multiparty Democracy	10,883	85.3
128. MONZE	27,309	48.0%	Joseph Sichoonga	United National Independence Party	1,874	14.7
129. MOOMBA	9,000	51.4%	Fitzpatrick Chuula	Movement for Multiparty Democracy	3,861	85.6
129. MOOMBA	9,000	51.4%	Jeremiah B. Chijikwa	United National Independence Party	649	14.4
130. ITEZH ITEZHI	11,460	37.2%	Dr John Shimabomda	Movement for Multiparty Democracy	3,340	81.0
130. ITEZH ITEZHI	11,460	37.2%	Shadreck N. Mwimbwa	United National Independence Party	784	19.0
131. NAMWALA	18,631	32.4%	Lovemore K. Chulu	Movement for Multiparty Democracy	4,611	78.2
131. NAMWALA	18,631	32.4%	Biggie Nkumbula	United National Independence Party	1,286	21.8
132. SIAVONGA	18,424	43.3%	Fredrick S. Hapunda	Movement for Multiparty Democracy	6,890	89.4
132. SIAVONGA	18,424	43.3%	Phanuel L. Simamba	United National Independence Party	814	10.6
133. SINAZONGWE	25,647	39.5%	Syacheye Phiri Madyenkuku	Movement for Multiparty Democracy	8,977	92.2
133. SINAZONGWE	25,647	39.5%	Dodson Billy Syatalimi	United National Independence Party	756	7.8
Western Province 17 seats
134. KALABO	20,230	39.8%	Arthur N.L. Wina	Movement for Multiparty Democracy	6,072	78.7
134. KALABO	20,230	39.8%	John K. Miyato	United National Independence Party	1,464	19.0
134. KALABO	20,230	39.8%	Geofrey M. Kaogongwe	Independent	184	2.4
135. LIUWA	9,647	41.4%	Amusaa Mwanamwambwa	Movement for Multiparty Democracy	3,397	86.6
135. LIUWA	9,647	41.4%	Namushi Namuchana	United National Independence Party	343	8.7
135. LIUWA	9,647	41.4%	Lioko Mbaimbai	Independent	182	4.6
136. SIKONGO	15,807	38.1%	Ber Simon Zukas	Movement for Multiparty Democracy	4,884	85.3
136. SIKONGO	15,807	38.1%	Mbambo M. Sianga	United National Independence Party	596	10.4
136. SIKONGO	15,807	38.1%	Dennys M. Luywa	Independent	247	4.3
137. KAOMA	17,481	36.0%	Godden K. Mandandi	Movement for Multiparty Democracy	4,616	74.9
137. KAOMA	17,481	36.0%	Dominic N. Mbangu	United National Independence Party	1,544	25.1
138. LUAMPA	10,975	40.4%	Stephen Manjata	Movement for Multiparty Democracy	2,124	51.1
138. LUAMPA	10,975	40.4%	Kenneth K. Musangu	United National Independence Party	2,034	48.9
139. MANGANGO	9,417	39.5%	Ricky M. Tumbila	Movement for Multiparty Democracy	1,927	54.4
139. MANGANGO	9,417	39.5%	Dominic Shipimbi	United National Independence Party	1,617	45.6
140. LUKULU EAST	15,154	41.7%	Alfred Lienda	Movement for Multiparty Democracy	3,332	52.8
140. LUKULU EAST	15,154	41.7%	Alexis Luhila	United National Independence Party	2,984	47.2
141. LUKULU WEST	6,249	25.2%	Simon C. Ngombo	Movement for Multiparty Democracy	879	55.8
141. LUKULU WEST	6,249	25.2%	Godwin Sapatu	United National Independence Party	697	44.2
142. LUENA	16,454	44.9%	Mubukwanu S. Kunyanda	Movement for Multiparty Democracy	6,261	87.0
142. LUENA	16,454	44.9%	Crispin U. Sibeta	United National Independence Party	937	13.0
143. MONGU	29,307	47.7%	Mbikusita Lewanika	Movement for Multiparty Democracy	11,990	88.2
143. MONGU	29,307	47.7%	Munukayumbwa Sipalo	United National Independence Party	1,604	11.8
144. NALIKWANDA	12,741	45.0%	Mufaya Mumbuna	Movement for Multiparty Democracy	4,644	83.5
144. NALIKWANDA	12,741	45.0%	Albert Situmbeko	United National Independence Party	690	12.4
144. NALIKWANDA	12,741	45.0%	Namonde Kamayoyo	Independent	229	4.1
145. NALOLO	13,364	43.0%	Henry M. Kabika	Movement for Multiparty Democracy	5,087	91.1
145. NALOLO	13,364	43.0%	Ement N. Anamela	United National Independence Party	498	8.9
146. SENANGA	15,852	41.6%	Inonge M. Lewanika	Movement for Multiparty Democracy	5,726	88.5
146. SENANGA	15,852	41.6%	Likando Kalaluka	United National Independence Party	741	11.5
147. SINJEMBELA	13,495	36.6%	Keli S. Walubita	Movement for Multiparty Democracy	4,313	91.2
147. SINJEMBELA	13,495	36.6%	Dr. Andrew Namsota	United National Independence Party	418	8.8
148. MULOBEZI	7,602	45.0%	Leonard Subulwa	Movement for Multiparty Democracy	2,919	87.3
148. MULOBEZI	7,602	45.0%	Patricia M.M. Chanda	United National Independence Party	425	12.7
149. MWANDI	7,600	41.9%	Kakoma Sefulo	Movement for Multiparty Democracy	2,524	80.2
149. MWANDI	7,600	41.9%	Andrew N. Yeta	United National Independence Party	625	19.8
150. SESHEKE	9,565	41.7%	Richard H. Nganga	Movement for Multiparty Democracy	3,373	86.0
150. SESHEKE	9,565	41.7%	Henry S. Mebelo	United National Independence Party	549	14.0

== Sources ==
- Electoral Commission of Zambia
