= Bweengwa (constituency) =

Constituency of the National Assembly of Zambia

Bweengwa is a constituency of the National Assembly of Zambia. It covers Bweengwa in the Monze District of Southern Province, and was originally known as Monze West.

== List of MPs ==
Election year	MP	Party
Monze West
1968	Harry Nkumbula	Zambian African National Congress
Bweengwa
1973	Harry Nkumbula	United National Independence Party
1978	Rex Natala	United National Independence Party
1983	Rex Natala	United National Independence Party
1988	Eli Mwanang'onze	United National Independence Party
1991	Baldwin Nkumbula	Movement for Multi-Party Democracy
1993 (by-election)	Baldwin Nkumbula	National Party
1995 (by-election)	Edgar Keembe	Movement for Multi-Party Democracy
1996	Edgar Keembe	Movement for Multi-Party Democracy
2001	Japhet Moonde	United Party for National Development
2006	Highvie Hamududu	United Democratic Alliance
2011	Highvie Hamududu	United Party for National Development
2016	Kasautu Michelo	United Party for National Development
2021	Kasautu Michelo	United Party for National Development
2026	Kasautu Michelo	United Party for National Development
