= Japhet Moonde =

Zambian politician

Member of the National Assembly for Bweengwa
- In office 2001–2006
- Preceded by: Edgar Keembe
- Succeeded by: Highvie Hamududu

Personal details
- Born: 7 April 1949
- Died: 2006
- Political party: UPND
- Profession: Accountant, trade unionist

Japhet Chibulo Moonde (7 April 1949 – 2006) was a Zambian trade unionist and politician. He served as Member of the National Assembly for Bweengwa from 2001 until his death in 2006.

== Biography ==
Moonde was an accountant by profession, also becoming a trade unionist. He served as General Secretary of the Civil Servants Union of Zambia and Vice President of the Zambia Congress of Trade Unions. In 2001 he was selected to contest the Bweengwa constituency as the United Party for National Development candidate in the general elections that year. He went on to defeat incumbent MP Edgar Keembe, who had defected from the Movement for Multi-Party Democracy to the Forum for Democracy and Development prior to the elections, and was elected to the National Assembly.

Moonde died in 2006, with Highvie Hamududu replacing him as the UPND candidate for Bweengwa for the 2006 elections.
