= Mangango (constituency) =

Constituency of the National Assembly of Zambia

Mangango is a constituency of the National Assembly of Zambia. It covers part of Kaoma District in Western Province.

== List of MPs ==
Election year	MP	Party
Mangango
1991	Moffat Ricky Tumbila	Movement for Multi-Party Democracy
1996	Crispin Shumina	Independent
2001	Crispin Shumina	Forum for Democracy and Development
2006	Mwendoi Akakandelwa	Movement for Multi-Party Democracy
2011	Robert Taundi	Movement for Multi-Party Democracy
2014 (by-election)	Rodgers Lingweshi	Patriotic Front
2016	Naluwa Mwene	United Party for National Development
2018 (by-election)	Goodwin Putu	Patriotic Front
2021	Luhamba Mwene	United Party for National Development
2026	Luhamba Mwene	United Party for National Development
