= Sydney Mushanga =

Zambian politician

Member of the National Assembly for Bwacha South
- Incumbent
- Assumed office August 2026

Member of the National Assembly for Bwacha
- In office September 2011 – May 2026
- Preceded by: Gladys Nyirongo

Minister for Central Province
- In office September 2016 – May 2021
- President: Edgar Lungu
- Preceded by: Davies Chisopa
- Succeeded by: Credo Nanjuwa

Personal details
- Born: 26 April 1977 (age 49)
- Party: Patriotic Front (2011 - 2026); UPND (2026 - present)
- Profession: IT specialist, teacher

Sydney Mushanga (born 26 April 1977) is a Zambian politician. He currently serves as Member of the National Assembly for Bwacha South.

== Biography ==
Prior to entering politics he worked as an IT specialist and as a teacher. Ahead of the 2011 general election he was selected as the Patriotic Front (PF) candidate for Bwacha constituency ahead of the sitting MP Gladys Nyirongo, and was subsequently elected to the National Assembly. He was re-elected in 2016, beating out United Party for National Development (UPND) rival Saidi Chibwana.

After serving as Deputy Minister of Education, Vocational Training and Early Education for a little over a year, President Edgar Lungu appointed him Minister for Central Province after the 2016 election, and he served in that position for the entire term up to May 2021.

Mushanga was re-elected as the Bwacha constituency MP at the 2021 general election. In March 2026, Mushanga left the Patriotic Front in order to join the United Party for National Development (UPND), with party president Hakainde Hichilema making the announcement that Mushanga will stand in Bwacha constituency as the UPND candidate at the 2026 general election. In April 2026, Bwacha constituency was split into two constituencies (Bwacha North and Bwacha South) and Mushanga selected Bwacha South as the constituency to stand in as the UPND candidate. At the election on 13 August 2026, Mushanga was elected as the Bwacha South MP.
