= Lundazi (constituency) =

Constituency of the National Assembly of Zambia

Lundazi is a constituency of the National Assembly of Zambia. It covers Chigona, Kaitondi and Lundazi in Eastern Province.

== List of MPs ==
Election year	MP	Party
1964	Axon Soko	United National Independence Party
Seat abolished (split into Lundazi Central, Lundazi East and Lundazi South)
1973	Axon Soko	United National Independence Party
1978	James Nyirongo	United National Independence Party
1983	James Nyirongo	United National Independence Party
1988	Dingiswago Banda	United National Independence Party
1991	Dingiswayo Banda	United National Independence Party
1996	Chrisford Ngulube	Movement for Multi-Party Democracy
2001	Mkhondo Lungu	United National Independence Party
2006	Mkhondo Lungu	United Democratic Alliance
2011	Mkhondo Lungu	Movement for Multi-Party Democracy
2016	Lawrence Nyirenda	Independent
2021	Brenda Nyirenda	Patriotic Front
2026	Brenda Nyirenda	National Reconciliation Party for Unity and Prosperity
