= Bwacha South =

National Assembly constituency in Zambia

Bwacha South is a constituency of the National Assembly of Zambia. It was created in 2026 when Bwacha constituency was split into two constituencies (Bwacha South and Bwacha North). It covers the south-western part of Kabwe District.

== List of MPs ==
Election year	MP	Party
2026	Sydney Mushanga	United Party for National Development
