= Chawama (constituency) =

Constituency of the National Assembly of Zambia

Chawama is a constituency of the National Assembly of Zambia. It covers the south-west of Lusaka in Lusaka District, including the suburbs of Chawama, Lilayi and Misisi. Notable persons from the constituency include former president Edgar Chagwa Lungu, Lawrence Sichalwe, Tasila Lungu and music executive, William Farai Banda among others.

== List of MPs ==
Election year	MP	Party
1991	Christon Tembo	Movement for Multi-Party Democracy
1996	Christon Tembo	Movement for Multi-Party Democracy
2001	Geoffrey Samukonga	Forum for Democracy and Development
2006	Violet Sampa-Bredt	Patriotic Front
2011	Edgar Lungu	Patriotic Front
2015 (by-election)	Lawrence Sichalwe	Patriotic Front
2016	Lawrence Sichalwe	Patriotic Front
2021	Tasila Lungu	Patriotic Front
2026 (by-election)	Bright Nundwe	Forum for Democracy and Development
2026	Abel Ng'andu	United Party for National Development
