= Kalabo Central =

Constituency of the National Assembly of Zambia

Kalabo Central is a constituency of the National Assembly of Zambia. It covers the southern part of Kalabo District in Western Province, including the town of Kalabo.

== List of MPs ==
Election year	MP	Party
Kalabo
1964	Mubiana Nalilungwe	United National Independence Party
1968	Mbambo Sianga	Zambian African National Congress
1973	Maimbolwa Sakubita	United National Independence Party
1974 (by-election)	Nalumino Mundia	United National Independence Party
1978	Lioko Mbaimbai	United National Independence Party
1983	John Miyato	United National Independence Party
1988	John Miyato	United National Independence Party
1991	Arthur Wina	Movement for Multi-Party Democracy
1993 (by-election)	Arthur Wina	National Party
1996	Godfrey Simasiku	Agenda for Zambia
2001	Queen Kakoma	United Party for National Development
Kalabo Central
2006	Sikwibele Mwapela	United Party for National Development
2011	Chinga Miyutu	Patriotic Front
2016	Chinga Miyutu	United Party for National Development
2021	Chinga Miyutu	United Party for National Development
2026	Akufuna Simushi	United Party for National Development
