= 2026 Chawama by-election =

By-election in Zambia

- 15 January 2026
Nominee	Nundwe Bright	Muunda Morgan	Mulenga Davison
Party	FDD	UPND	CF
Popular vote	8,085	6,542	1,534
Percentage	45.41%	36.74%	8.62%
Member of Parliament before election
Tasila Lungu
PF
Elected Member of Parliament
Nundwe Bright
FDD

The Chawama National Assembly by-election was held on 15 January 2026 to elect a Member of Parliament for the Chawama Constituency in the Lusaka District of Zambia. The by-election was won by Nundwe Bright of the FDD, who defeated Muunda Morgan of the UPND and seven other candidates.

== Background ==
The seat became vacant after the Speaker of the National Assembly, Nelly Mutti, declared it so due to the prolonged absence of the incumbent MP, Tasila Lungu. The Speaker invoked Article 72(2)(c) of the Constitution of Zambia following Lungu's absence during events related to her father's burial delays.

== Candidates ==
Nominations opened on December 16, 2025, with the campaign period running from December 17, 2025, to January 14, 2026. The Electoral Commission of Zambia (ECZ) expects over 15 candidates, requiring Grade 12 certificates or equivalents. A total of nine candidates successfully filed their nominations. The candidates represent a mix of established political parties and independent runners.

No.	Candidate	Party
1	Mulenga Davison	Citizens First
2	Musukuma Ntazana	Leadership Movement
3	Mutete Mohammad	New Congress Party
4	Muunda Morgan	United Party for National Development
5	Nundwe Bright	Forum for Democracy and Development
6	Phiri James	National Democratic Congress
7	Mageza Alfred	Independent
8	Mwenya George	Independent
9	Siatwaambo Elijah	Independent

== Results ==
Candidate	Party	Votes	%
Nundwe Bright	Forum for Democracy and Development	8,085	45.41
Muunda Morgan	United Party for National Development	6,542	36.74
Mulenga Davison	Citizens First	1,534	8.62
Mwenya George	Independent	466	2.62
Siatwaambo Elijah	Independent	428	2.40
Mutete Mohammad	New Congress Party	319	1.79
Ndiweni Alfred	Economic and People's Party	239	1.34
Musukuma Ntazana	Leadership Movement	100	0.56
Phiri James	National Democratic Congress	93	0.52
Total		17,806	100.00
Valid votes		17,806	98.40
Invalid/blank votes		290	1.60
Total votes		18,096	100.00
Source: Electoral Commission of Zambia

== Reactions ==
The Electoral Commission of Zambia stated that the election was conducted smoothly and peacefully, with ECZ chairperson Mwangala Zaloumis confirming that the process was completed without incident. Government spokesperson Cornelius Mweetwa commended Chawama voters for a peaceful poll, describing the outcome as evidence of a thriving democracy and a positive signal ahead of the 2026 general elections.

Former Patriotic Front minister Chishimba Kambwili described the opposition campaign in Chawama as effective and attributed the victory of FDD candidate Bright Nundwe to addressing local concerns such as hunger, load shedding, and dissatisfaction with the national government. He also emphasised opposition cooperation in the campaign.
