= Eli Mwanang'onze =

Zambian academic and politician

Member of the National Assembly
- In office 1988–1991
- Preceded by: Rex Natala
- Succeeded by: Baldwin Nkumbula
- Constituency: Bweengwa

Minister of General Education, Youth and Sport

Personal details
- Political party: United National Independence Party

Dr Elimelech Hanakumbo Bulowa Mwanang'onze is a Zambian academic and former politician. He served as Member of the National Assembly for Bweengwa from 1988 until 1991, as well as holding the post of Minister of General Education, Youth and Sport.

== Biography ==
Mwanang'onze obtained an MSc in geology at the University of Manitoba in 1974, before earning a PhD at the same university in 1978. He later worked as a lecturer at the School of Mines at the University of Zambia, and was chair of the Journal of African Marxists' editorial committee. He subsequently became a civil servant and was Permanent Secretary for Mines.

Mwanang'onze was elected to the National Assembly in the 1988 general elections at a time when Zambia was a one-party state with the United National Independence Party as the sole legal party. When multi-party democracy was introduced in the early 1990s, he did not contest the 1991 general elections and was succeeded by Baldwin Nkumbula.
