= Chifunabuli (constituency) =

Constituency of the National Assembly of Zambia

Chifunabuli was a constituency of the National Assembly of Zambia. It covered the towns of Lubwe, Mwansakombe and Mwena in Chifunabuli District of Luapula Province.

== List of MPs ==
Election year	MP	Party
1983	Clement Mwananshiku	United National Independence Party
1988	Anthony Ndalama	United National Independence Party
1991	Ernest Mwansa	Movement for Multi-Party Democracy
1996	Ernest Mwansa	Movement for Multi-Party Democracy
2001	Kennedy Sakeni	Movement for Multi-Party Democracy
2006	Ernest Mwansa	Patriotic Front
2011	Mutaba Mwali	Patriotic Front
2016	Ponde Mecha	Patriotic Front
2021	Julien Mfwanki Nyemba	Patriotic Front
Seat abolished (split into Chifunabuli North and Chifunabuli South)
