= Chifunabuli North =

National Assembly constituency in Zambia

Chifunabuli North is a constituency of the National Assembly of Zambia. It was created in 2026 when Chifunabuli constituency was split into two constituencies (Chifunabuli North and Chifunabuli South). It covers the northern part of Chifunabuli District.

== List of MPs ==
Election year	MP	Party
2026	Julien Nyemba	National Reconciliation Party for Unity and Prosperity
