= Gladys Nyirongo =

Zambian politician

Member of the National Assembly for Bwacha
- In office 2001–2011
- Preceded by: John Chisanga
- Succeeded by: Sydney Mushanga

Personal details
- Born: 11 November 1958 (age 67) Zambia
- Party: Heritage Party (before 2002); MMD (2002-2016); Patriotic Front (2016-)
- Spouse: Pastor Jim Nyirongo

Gladys Nyirongo is a Zambian politician. She was the Bwacha constituency member of parliament from 2001 to 2011. She was appointed as the Minister of Sports in 2002 and later as the Minister of Lands in 2006.

Nyirongo was a member of the Heritage Party and won the Bwacha MP seat in the 2001 election. She voted in favour of the Speaker for the ruling Levy Mwanawasa from the Movement for Multi-Party Democracy (MMD) and consequentially was expelled from the Heritage Party in 2002. She decided to stand in the resulting Bwacha constituency by-election as the MMD candidate and retained her parliamentary seat. She was then appointed as the Sports Minister.

She retained her Bwacha MP seat at the 2006 election as the MMD candidate and was then appointed as the Minister of Lands until president Levy Mwanawasa sacked her in March 2007 under accusations that she handed out land plots to her family. A magistrate court sentenced her to four years imprisonment in 2009, which was reduced in 2010 to two years following her appeal in the High Court. She joined the ruling Patriotic Front in June 2016.

== Political career ==
Nyirongo was a member of the Heritage Party in Zambia. During the 2001 election, she was elected as the Bwacha constituency member of parliament while Levy Mwanawasa from the Movement for Multi-Party Democracy (MMD) was elected as the President. The MMD won 69 of the 150 seats in parliament and thus was 6 seats short of a majority. He had recommended a Speaker of the house and needed some of the opposition party members to vote for his candidate as the Speaker of the house. Nyirongo was one of the four Heritage Party members who voted for him and consequentially, she was expelled from the Heritage Party in 2002. Her expulsion led to a parliamentary by-election in Bwacha and she re-contested as the MMD candidate. She won the by-election and retained her parliamentary seat. She was then appointed the Sports Minister in 2002. She stood again at the 2006 election as the MMD candidate for Bwacha constituency in Kabwe District, claiming 51.4 per cent of the total votes polled.

=== Lands Ministry ===
On 9 October 2006, she was appointed as the Lands Minister in the cabinet of Levy Mwanawasa with Moses Muteteka as her deputy. The President suspended her along with the Commissioner of Lands, Frighon Sichone. She was suspended on 1 March 2007 following a corruption scandal in land allocation involving senior officials. The suspension was effected to allow independent investigation from the Drug and Enforcement Commission. The report from the Zambia State House noted that Rv. Nyirongo allocated land to herself, her husband, son Walinase Nyirongo and daughter. The note also stated that she illegally allocated 25,000 hectares of land in Mpika to a foreigner against provisions that require approval from the President. Ms. Mukkuka Zimba, the permanent secretary of the ministry, was also suspended for her alleged involvement in illegal land deals.

=== Corruption charges, sentence and aftermath ===
Nyirongo was charged under Section 99(1) of the Penal Code Chapter 87 of Laws of Zambia for abusing her office as a minister by misappropriating land procedures in two counts. In the first count, she was accused of directing Daisy Mulenga Msoka in some date in 2006 and 2007, an officer in her ministry to issue offer letters to selected individuals, namely Walinase Nyirongo, Janet Isaac Nyirongo, Peter Kapolyo, Peter Ngulube, Precious Ndhlovu, Doris Mulenga Mubanga Nuyunji, Mickey Mukubu, Mwelwa Kamfwa, Bruce Chipasha and Dingwall Hayden in Foxdale. The second count of accusation detailed her order to a junior technical officer in Ministry of Agriculture and Co-operatives to subdivide Zambia Consolidate Coppermine to be allocated to herself. On 13 January 2009, The Magistrate court ruled that she was convicted and sentenced her to four years imprisonment with the first two years with hard labour. She appe aled against her sentence in High Court, which upheld the judgment of the lower court, but reduced her sentence to two years. The sentence was pronounced on 7 October 2010 and the court informed that the sentence was reduced to preserve her parliamentary position.

She joined the Patriotic Front in June 2016 and campaigned for the party ahead of the August 2016 general election.
