= Chasefu (constituency) =

Constituency of the National Assembly of Zambia

Chasefu was a constituency of the National Assembly of Zambia. It covered the town of Chasefu in Chasefu District of Eastern Province.

== List of MPs ==
Election year	MP	Party
1973	Haswell Mwale	United National Independence Party
1978	Sandress Zimba	United National Independence Party
1983	Raston Chirwa	United National Independence Party
1985 (by-election)	Charles Nyirenda	United National Independence Party
1988	Stanley Phiri	United National Independence Party
1991	Stanley Phiri	United National Independence Party
1993 (by-election)	Rhodwell Nyirenda	United National Independence Party
1996	Dorothy Tembo	Movement for Multi-Party Democracy
2001	Yotam Banda	United National Independence Party
2006	Chifumu Banda	United Democratic Alliance
2011	Chifumu Banda	Forum for Democracy and Development
2016	Gerald Zimba	Patriotic Front
2021	Misheck Nyambose	Independent
Seat abolished (split into Chasefu North and Chasefu South)
