= Julien Mfwanki Nyemba =

Zambian politician, MP for Chifunabuli

Member of Parliament for Chifunabuli North
- Incumbent
- Assumed office 14 August 2026

Member of Parliament for Chifunabuli
- In office 15 August 2021 – 15 May 2026
- Preceded by: Ponde Mecha

Personal details
- Party: Patriotic Front (before 2021); NRPUP (2021 to present)
- Profession: Administrator, Teacher

Julien Mfwanki Nyemba (born 31 August 1962) is a Zambian politician currently serving as the Member of Parliament for Chifunabuli North. He was the member of parliament for Chifunabuli constituency from August 2021 to May 2026.

== Early life and education ==
Nyemba holds a Bachelor of Education in Leadership and Management, a Diploma in Office Management/Administration, a Primary School Teacher’s Certificate, and a Grade 12 Certificate. Professionally, she has served as both a teacher and an administrator.

== Political career ==
Julien Nyemba stood as the Patriotic Front candidate for parliament in Chifunabuli constituency at the 2021 general election and he was elected.

Ahead of the 2026 general election, Chifunabuli constituency (where he was the incumbent) was split into two constituencies (Chifunabuli North and Chifunabuli South) and Nyemba decided to contest as the National Reconciliation Party for Unity and Prosperity candidate for parliament in Chifunabuli North. At the election in August 2026, he was elected as the Chifunabuli North MP.
