= Kafue East =

National Assembly constituency in Zambia

Kafue East is a constituency of the National Assembly of Zambia. It was created in 2026 when Kafue constituency was split into two constituencies (Kafue East and Kafue West). It covers the eastern part of Kafue District, including Shimabala, Shantumbu and Chiawa.

== List of MPs ==
Election year	MP	Party
2026	Buumba Malambo	United Party for National Development
