= Gerald Zimba =

Zambian politician

Gerald Greenford Zimba

Member of the National Assembly for Chasefu
- In office 11 August 2016 – 2021
- President: Edgar Lungu

Personal details
- Born: 3 September 1973 (age 52) Zambia
- Party: Patriotic Front
- Profession: Accountant

Gerald Greenford Zimba (born 3 September 1973) is a Zambian politician and accountant who served as the Member of Parliament for Chasefu from 2016 to 2021, representing the Patriotic Front.

== Early life and education ==
Zimba was born on 3 September 1973 in Zambia. He holds a diploma in Bookkeeping and Accounts and completed Form V education.

== Political career ==
Zimba was elected as the Member of Parliament for Chasefu in the 2016 general election on the Patriotic Front ticket.

During his tenure, he served on the Committee on Transport, Works and Supply from October 2017 to May 2021, and on the Committee on Local Government Accounts from October 2016 to September 2017.

== Personal life ==
Zimba is married and enjoys playing chess, reading, and watching football.
