= Kafue West =

National Assembly constituency in Zambia

Kafue West is a constituency of the National Assembly of Zambia. It was created in 2026 when Kafue constituency was split into two constituencies (Kafue East and Kafue West). It covers the western part of Kafue District, including Kafue Estates and the Kafue town centre.

== List of MPs ==
Election year	MP	Party
2026	Obvious Mwaliteta	United Party for National Development
