= Kasautu Michelo =

Zambian politician

Member of the National Assembly for Bweengwa
- Incumbent
- Assumed office 2016
- Preceded by: Highvie Hamududu

Personal details
- Born: 7 August 1974 (age 51); Banakaila, Zambia
- Political party: United Party for National Development
- Profession: Farmer

Kasautu Saiti Michelo (born 7 August 1974) is a Zambian politician. He currently serves as Member of the National Assembly for Bweengwa.

== Biography ==
Michelo was born in Banakaila in Monze District and attended the Kazungula Settlement School and Rusangu Secondary School. He studied for several agricultural qualifications at the Zambia College of Agriculture and worked as a dairy technician at Golden Valley Agriculture Research Trust between 2001 and 2005. Michelo then attended university in the Netherlands, before returning to Zambia. Working as a farmer, he created the Monze Dairy Farmers' Co-operative Society, and also formed several other local farming co-operatives.

Prior to the 2016 general elections he was selected as the United Party for National Development candidate for Bweengwa ahead of the sitting MP Highvie Hamududu, and was subsequently elected to the National Assembly with a 19,638-vote majority. After becoming an MP, he joined the Committee on Agriculture, Lands and Natural Resources and the Parliamentary Reforms and Modernisation Committee.

Michelo lives on a farm near Monze and is married with four children.
