= Kawambwa (constituency) =

Constituency of the National Assembly of Zambia

Kawambwa is a constituency of the National Assembly of Zambia. It covers the town of Kawambwa in Kawambwa District of Luapula Province.

== List of MPs ==
Election year	MP	Party
1964	Dingiswayo Banda	United National Independence Party
1968	John Mwanakatwe	United National Independence Party
1973	Protasio Mwela	United National Independence Party
1978	Titus Mukupo	United National Independence Party
1983	Edwin Chansa	United National Independence Party
1988	Francis Kapansa	United National Independence Party
1991	Joseph Mpundu	Movement for Multi-Party Democracy
1996	Elizabeth Mutale	Movement for Multi-Party Democracy
2001	Afrika Chungu	Movement for Multi-Party Democracy
2006	Elizabeth Chitika	Patriotic Front
2011	Nickson Chilangwa	Patriotic Front
2016	Nickson Chilangwa	Patriotic Front
2021	Nickson Chilangwa	Patriotic Front
2024 (by-election)	Nason Musonda	United Party for National Development
2026	Danstan Bufungau	National Reconciliation Party for Unity and Prosperity
