= Lukulu North =

National Assembly constituency in Zambia

Lukulu North is a constituency of the National Assembly of Zambia. It was created in 2026 when Lukulu East was split into two constituencies (Lukulu North and Lukulu South). It covers the northern part of Lukulu District, including the Lukulu town centre.

== List of MPs ==
Election year	MP	Party
2026	Kahale Kahale	United Party for National Development
