= Bwacha North =

National Assembly constituency in Zambia

Bwacha North is a constituency of the National Assembly of Zambia. It was created in 2026 when Bwacha constituency was split into two constituencies (Bwacha South and Bwacha North). It covers the north-western part of Kabwe District.

== List of MPs ==
Election year	MP	Party
2026	Walinese Nyirongo	National Reconciliation Party for Unity and Prosperity
