= Kalalwe Mukosa =

Zambian accountant, politician and Member of Parliament for Chinsali

Kalalwe Andrew Mukosa

Member of the National Assembly for Chinsali
- In office 11 August 2016 – May 2026
- Preceded by: Christopher Mulenga
- Succeeded by: Chanda Mwansa

Personal details
- Born: 9 June 1984 (age 42) Zambia
- Party: Patriotic Front
- Education: CIMA; MA in Economics; MBA in International Business
- Profession: Accountant · Businessman

Kalalwe Andrew Mukosa (born 9 June 1984) is a Zambian accountant, businessman, and politician. As a member of the Patriotic Front, he represented Chinsali in the National Assembly of Zambia from August 2016 to May 2026.

== Early life and education ==
Mukosa trained as an accountant and holds qualifications including CIMA, a Master of Arts in Economics, and an MBA in International Business.

== Parliamentary career ==
Mukosa was elected to Parliament on 11 August 2016 representing Chinsali under the PF banner. He was re-elected in the 2021 general election.

Mukosa has served as a backbench MP and was a member of the Public Accounts Committee from February 2018 until May 2021. He later served on that committee again from September 2021 to July 2023, and joined the Planning and Budgeting Committee in September 2023.

In March 2023, he, along with other PF MPs, was suspended for seven days over misconduct in Parliament. This suspension was part of a larger disciplinary action involving multiple legislators.

== Controversies ==
Mukosa was initially elected in 2016 and had his election nullified by the Lusaka High Court in December 2021 due to electoral malpractice allegations, including vote buying and intimidation. However, the Constitutional Court overturned this nullification in December 2022, reinstating him as the legally elected MP.

== Notable initiatives ==
Mukosa highlighted a K90 million construction project for a General Hospital in Chinsali during a PF forum, noting it would serve residents across Muchinga Province and reduce referrals to hospitals in Lusaka and Kasama.
