= Kafue (constituency) =

Constituency of the National Assembly of Zambia

Kafue was a constituency of the National Assembly of Zambia. It covered a rural area in Kafue District of Lusaka Province, including the towns of Kafue and Chiawa.

== List of MPs ==
Election year	MP	Party
1973	Francis Matanda	United National Independence Party
1978	Bathsheba Ng'andu	United National Independence Party
1983	Francis Matanda	United National Independence Party
1986 (by-election)	Chanda Sosala	United National Independence Party
1988	Joel Shabusale	United National Independence Party
1991	Chanda Sosala	Movement for Multi-Party Democracy
1992 (by-election)	Akbar Yusuf Badat	Movement for Multi-Party Democracy
1996	Akbar Yusuf Badat	Movement for Multi-Party Democracy
2001	Robert Sichinga	United Party for National Development
2006	Bradford Machila	Movement for Multi-Party Democracy
2011	Obvious Mwaliteta	Patriotic Front
2016	Mirriam Chonya	United Party for National Development
2021	Mirriam Chonya	United Party for National Development
Seat abolished (split into Kafue West and Kafue East)
