= Highvie Hamududu =

Zambian politician

Member of the National Assembly for Bweengwa
- In office 2006–2016
- Preceded by: Japhet Moonde
- Succeeded by: Kasautu Michelo

Personal details
- Born: 23 March 1970 (age 55)
- Political party: UPND (until 2017); PNUP (since 2017)
- Profession: Economist

Highvie Hambulo Hamududu (born 23 March 1970) is a Zambian politician. He served as Member of the National Assembly for Bweengwa between 2006 and 2016.

== Biography ==
Hamududu studied for a bachelor's degree in economics at the University of Zambia. After graduating in 1994 he worked briefly at the cabinet office as a Manpower Information Officer, after which he joined Zambia Cooperative Federation Finance Services as a District Operations Officer in Livingstone and Choma. He later worked for Commerce Bank in Lusaka as an Assistant Credit Manager. In 1996 he moved to Namibia to work as a lecturer in economics at the Institute of Higher Education. He remained at the institute until 2006 when he returned to Zambia to run for parliament. He was elected to the National Assembly for Bweengwa constituency in the 2006 general elections as a member of the United Party for National Development (UPND), replacing the previous UPND MP Japhet Moonde who died shortly before the elections. He was re-elected in the 2011 general elections.

In February 2016 President Edgar Lungu claimed that he had offered Hamududu the post of Deputy Finance Minister, but had been turned down. Hamududu was subsequently sidelined and not selected as a UPND candidate for the 2016 elections, with Kasautu Michelo being selected in his place. While in parliament, Hamududu served as a member of Public Accounts Committee and Budget Estimates Committee and was its chairman for seven years. He also served as an Executive Committee Member of the African Parliamentary Forum on Population and Development. In March 2017 Hamududu resigned from the UPND. In May 2017 he launched the free-market Party of National Unity (PNU), becoming its president. The Party of National Unity was later rebranded as Party of National Unity and Progress (PNUP) in January 2021.
