= Rex Natala =

Zambian politician

Member of the National Assembly for Bweengwa
- In office 1978–1988
- Preceded by: Harry Nkumbula
- Succeeded by: Eli Mwanang'onze

Personal details
- Died: January 2011
- Political party: United National Independence Party

Amon Rex Natala (died January 2011) was a Zambian politician. He served as Member of the National Assembly for Bweengwa from 1978 until 1988.

== Biography ==
Natala was elected to the National Assembly in the 1978 after former Bweengwa MP Harry Nkumbula was deselected by the United National Independence Party (UNIP), then the sole legal party in the country. He was re-elected in 1983 general elections, before being replaced as the UNIP candidate by Eli Mwanang'onze for the 1988 general elections.

Away from politics, Natala was a farmer and chair of the organising committee of the Lwiindi Gonde ceremony. He was a cousin of politician Anderson Mazoka.
