= Bwacha (constituency) =

Constituency of the National Assembly of Zambia

Bwacha was a constituency of the National Assembly of Zambia. It covered the western part of Kabwe District in Central Province.

== List of MPs ==
Election year	MP	Party
1973	Richard Banda	United National Independence Party
1978	Richard Banda	United National Independence Party
1983	Richard Banda	United National Independence Party
1988	Richard Banda	United National Independence Party
1991	Wendy Membe	Movement for Multi-Party Democracy
1996	John Chisanga	Movement for Multi-Party Democracy
2001	Gladys Nyirongo	Heritage Party
2002 (by-election)	Gladys Nyirongo	Movement for Multi-Party Democracy
2006	Gladys Nyirongo	Movement for Multi-Party Democracy
2011	Sydney Mushanga	Patriotic Front
2016	Sydney Mushanga	Patriotic Front
2021	Sydney Mushanga	Patriotic Front
Seat abolished (split into Bwacha North and Bwacha South)

== Election results ==
=== 2021 ===
2021 general election
Candidate	Party	Votes	%
Sydney Mushanga	Patriotic Front	18,299	51.99
Chato Percy	United Party for National Development	16,072	45.67
Charles Simuntala	Democratic Party	479	1.36
Simon Bwalya	Socialist Party	345	0.98
Invalid/blank votes		770	–
Total		35,965	100
Registered voters/turnout		51,456	69.89

=== 2001 ===
2001 general election
Candidate	Party	Votes	%
Gladys Nyirongo	Heritage Party	4,139	29.54
Mwila Kunda	Movement for Multi-Party Democracy	3,568	25.46
Augustine M. Walichupa	United Party for National Development	2,038	14.54
Richard Banda	United National Independence Party	1,541	11.00
Kasongo J. Mpwampu	Forum for Democracy and Development	1,170	8.35
John Chisanga	Patriotic Front	639	4.56
Emmerson C. Mweene	National Citizens' Coalition	436	3.11
Mark Mumbi	Zambia Republican Party	346	2.47
David Kasuba	National League for Democracy	136	0.97
Invalid/blank votes		60	–
Total		14,073	100
Registered voters/turnout		18,929	74.35
