= Lukulu East =

Constituency of the National Assembly of Zambia

Lukulu East was a constituency of the National Assembly of Zambia. It covered Lukulu District in Western Province, including the town of Lukulu.

== List of MPs ==
Election year	MP	Party
Lukulu East
1991	Alfred Lienda	Movement for Multi-Party Democracy
1996	Alexis Luhila	Independent
2001	Batuke Imenda	United Party for National Development
2003 (by-election)	Alexis Luhila	Movement for Multi-Party Democracy
2006	Batuke Imenda	United Liberal Party
2011	Christopher Kalila	Movement for Multi-Party Democracy
2016	Christopher Kalila	United Party for National Development
2021	Christopher Kalila	United Party for National Development
Seat abolished (split into Lukulu North and Lukulu South)
