= Nickson Chilangwa =

Zambian politician and former Provincial Minister

Member of the National Assembly of Zambia
- In office September 2011 – December 2024
- Preceded by: Elizabeth Chitika
- Succeeded by: Nason Musonda
- Constituency: Kawambwa

Provincial Minister for Luapula Province
- In office September 2016 – May 2021
- President: Edgar Lungu
- Preceded by: Fwanyanga Mulikita
- Succeeded by: Derricky Chilundika

Personal details
- Born: 10 January 1969 (age 57)
- Party: Patriotic Front
- Profession: Politician

Nickson Chilangwa (born 10 January 1969) is a Zambian politician who served as the Member of Parliament for Kawambwa Constituency in Luapula Province from 2011 to 2024. He is a member of the Patriotic Front and served as the Provincial Minister for Luapula Province from 2016 to 2021.

== Political career ==
Chilangwa was elected to the National Assembly of Zambia in three consecutive elections (2011, 2016 and 2021), representing Kawambwa under the Patriotic Front. He served as the Provincial Minister for Luapula Province from 2016 to 2021, where he was involved in infrastructure development, energy projects, and resource mobilization for local government initiatives.

During his tenure, Chilangwa was noted for advocating the use of local natural resources for regional development and strengthening ties with investors.

== Controversies ==
In the aftermath of the 2021 general election, during the Patriotic Front's transition to opposition, Chilangwa was mentioned in various political controversies. In 2022, he was briefly detained in connection with post-election political tensions but was later released without formal charges. He was then charged with malicious damage to property among other charges and was found guilty, which resulted in him forfeiting his Kawambwa parliamentary seat in late 2024.
