= Mwembeshi (constituency) =

Zambian National Assembly constituency

Mwembeshi was a constituency of the National Assembly of Zambia. It covers Muteli and Nampundwe in Shibuyunji District of Central Province.

== List of MPs ==
Election year	MP	Party
1991	Edward Shimwandwe	Movement for Multi-Party Democracy
1996	Yonnah Shimonde	Movement for Multi-Party Democracy
2001	Edward Kasoko	United Party for National Development
2006	Edward Kasoko	United Democratic Alliance
2011	Austin Milambo	United Party for National Development
2016	Machila Jamba	Independent
2021	Machila Jamba	United Party for National Development
Seat abolished (split into Mwembeshi West and Mwembeshi East)
