= Chinsali Central =

Constituency of the National Assembly of Zambia

Chinsali is a constituency of the National Assembly of Zambia. It covers Chinsali and several surrounding towns in Chinsali District of Muchinga Province.

== List of MPs ==
Election year	MP	Party
Chinsali
1964	Robert Makasa	United National Independence Party
Seat abolished (split into Chinsali North and Chinsali South)
1973	Boniface Shinga	United National Independence Party
1978	Yonamu Mpuku	United National Independence Party
1983	Boniface Shinga	United National Independence Party
1988	Francis Kaunda	United National Independence Party
1991	Katongo Mulenga	Movement for Multi-Party Democracy
1994 (by-election)	Charles Museba	Movement for Multi-Party Democracy
1996	David Kapangalwendo	Movement for Multi-Party Democracy
2001	Alex Musanya	Movement for Multi-Party Democracy
2006	Christopher Mulenga	Patriotic Front
2011	Christopher Mulenga	Patriotic Front
2016	Kalalwe Mukosa	Patriotic Front
2021	Kalalwe Mukosa	Patriotic Front
Chinsali Central
2026	Chanda Mwansa	National Reconciliation Party for Unity and Prosperity
