= Chifunabuli South =

National Assembly constituency in Zambia

Chifunabuli South is a constituency of the National Assembly of Zambia. It was created in 2026 when Chifunabuli constituency was split into two constituencies (Chifunabuli North and Chifunabuli South). It covers the southern part of Chifunabuli District.

== List of MPs ==
Election year	MP	Party
2026	Peter Kapala	United Party for National Development
