= Lukulu South =

National Assembly constituency in Zambia

Lukulu South is a constituency of the National Assembly of Zambia. It was created in 2026 when Lukulu East was split into two constituencies (Lukulu North and Lukulu South). It covers the southern part of Lukulu District.

== List of MPs ==
Election year	MP	Party
2026	Christopher Kalila	United Party for National Development
