= Chasefu North =

National Assembly constituency in Zambia

Chasefu North is a constituency of the National Assembly of Zambia. It was created in 2026 when Chasefu constituency was split into two constituencies (Chasefu North and Chasefu South). It covers the northern part of Chasefu District.

== List of MPs ==
Election year	MP	Party
Chasefu North
2026	Towani Chipeta	Independent
