= Chasefu South =

National Assembly constituency in Zambia

Chasefu South is a constituency of the National Assembly of Zambia. It was created in 2026 when Chasefu constituency was split into two constituencies (Chasefu North and Chasefu South). It covers the southern part of Chasefu District.

== List of MPs ==
Election year	MP	Party
2026	Misheck Nyambose	United Party for National Development
