= Violet Sampa-Bredt =

Zambian politician

Member of the National Assembly
- In office August 2006 – September 2011
- Preceded by: Geoffrey Samukonga
- Succeeded by: Edgar Lungu
- Constituency: Chawama

Personal details
- Born: 27 October 1950
- Died: 29 March 2015 (aged 64)
- Party: Patriotic Front
- Occupation: Politician

Violet Sampa-Bredt (27 October 1950 – 29 March 2015, Germany) was a Zambian politician who served as the member of the National Assembly for Chawama constituency from 2006 to 2011 as a member of the Patriotic Front. She also served as the General Secretary of the Council of Churches in Zambia.

She was:

- first ordained female Minister in the United Church of Zambia
- General Secretary of the Council of Churches in Zambia
- Member of National Assembly of Zambia 2006 to 2011

She was awarded the 1971 Winifred Kiek Scholarship.
