= Mirriam Chinyama Chonya =

Zambian politician (born 1971)

Mirriam Chinyama Chonya (born 25 January 1971) is a Zambian politician.

Chonya is a member of the National Assembly of Zambia for Kafue. She is a member of the United Party for National Development.
