= Sinjembela =

National Assembly constituency in Zambia, 1991–2016

Sinjembela was a constituency of the National Assembly of Zambia. It was abolished in 2016 when Sinjembela was split into two constituencies (Sioma and Shang'ombo).

== List of MPs ==
| Election year | MP | Party |
|---|---|---|
| 1991 | Keli S. Walubita | Movement for Multi-Party Democracy |
| 1996 | Sipakeli Walubita | Movement for Multi-Party Democracy |
| 2001 | Mubyana Pumulo | United Party for National Development |
| 2006 | Mubika Mubika | Movement for Multi-Party Democracy |
| 2011 | Poniso Njeulu | United Party for National Development |
