= Mwembeshi East =

National Assembly constituency in Zambia

Mwembeshi East, also referred to as Mwembezhi East, is a constituency of the National Assembly of Zambia. It was created in 2026 when Mwembeshi constituency was split into two constituencies (Mwembeshi West and Mwembeshi East). It covers the eastern part of Shibuyunji District.

== List of MPs ==
Election year	MP	Party
2026	Fedy Shikabwali	United Party for National Development
