= Edgar Keembe =

Zambian politician

Member of the National Assembly for Bweengwa
- In office 1995–2001
- Preceded by: Baldwin Nkumbula
- Succeeded by: Japhet Moonde

Personal details
- Political party: MMD, FDD

Edgar N. Keembe is a Zambian politician. He served as Member of the National Assembly for Bweengwa from 1995 until 2001.

== Biography ==
A member of the Movement for Multi-Party Democracy (MMD), Keembe was elected to the National Assembly in a 1995 by-election following the death of the incumbent MP Baldwin Nkumbula. He was re-elected in the 1996 general elections. In April 2001 he was suspended from the MMD for opposing attempts by President Frederick Chiluba to seek a third term in office. He subsequently left the party and joined the Forum for Democracy and Development (FDD). He was the FDD candidate in Bweengwa in the 2001 general elections, but was defeated by Japhet Moonde of the United Party for National Development. He later rejoined the MMD and became its Deputy National Chairman.
