= Mwembeshi West =

National Assembly constituency in Zambia

Mwembeshi West, also referred to as Mwembezhi West, is a constituency of the National Assembly of Zambia. It was created in 2026 when Mwembeshi constituency was split into two constituencies (Mwembeshi West and Mwembeshi East). It covers the western part of Shibuyunji District.

== List of MPs ==
Election year	MP	Party
2026	Austin Milambo	United Party for National Development
