= Crispin Shumina =

Zambian politician

Crispin M. Shumina is a member of the Pan-African Parliament from Zambia.
