= Edith Nawakwi =

Zambian politician and economist (1959–2025)

Minister of Finance
- In office 1998 – 1999
- President: Frederick Chiluba
- Preceded by: Ronald Penza
- Succeeded by: Katele Kalumba

Member of Parliament for Nakonde
- In office 1991–2001
- Preceded by: Arnold Simuchimba
- Succeeded by: Clever Silavwe

Member of Parliament for Munali
- In office 2002–2006
- Preceded by: Sonny Mulenga
- Succeeded by: Chilufya Mumbi

Personal details
- Born: Edith Zewelani Nawakwi; 24 June 1959 Mwenzo, Northern Province, Federation of Rhodesia and Nyasaland
- Died: 7 April 2025 (aged 65)
- Party: Movement for Multi-Party Democracy (1990 - 2001); Forum for Democracy and Development (2001 - 2025)
- Spouse: Geofrey Hambulo
- Children: 3
- Education: University of Zambia; Imperial College London
- Occupation: Politician; advocate
- Profession: Economist

Edith Zewelani Nawakwi (24 June 1959 – 7 April 2025) was a Zambian politician and economist. She was the first woman in Zambia to hold the post of Minister of Finance following her appointment in 1998 since Zambia's independence 33 years previously to that time. She was also the first woman to hold that post in the SADC region. Nawakwi was the President of the Forum for Democracy and Development under which she ran for president at the 2011 general election and the 2016 general election.

== Early life and education ==
Nawakwi was born in Mwenzo, now in Northern Province of Zambia. She held a degree in Agriculture Economics and Business Management from the University of Zambia and a post-graduate diploma in Economics of Energy and Development from Imperial College London, London.

== Career ==
Nawakwi's political career saw her join the Movement for Multi-Party Democracy (MMD) in 1990. She held various political positions including Minister of State for Energy & Water Development, Minister of Energy & Water Development, Minister of Agriculture, Food & Fisheries, Minister of Finance and Minister of Labour & Social Security between 1992 and 2001. She was the member of Parliament for Nakonde Constituency from 1991 to 2001 and the member of Parliament for Munali Constituency from 2002 to 2006.

In 2001, she and some ex-members of the Movement for Multi-Party Democracy formed the Forum for Democracy and Development where she served as the party's secretary-general and vice-president before she was elected party president in 2005, making her the first woman in Zambia to achieve such a feat. In 2011, under the platform of the Forum for Democracy and Development, she was the only woman who contested the 2011 general election, placing seventh on the log with a total of 6,833 votes. She also contested the 2015 presidential election, placing third with a vote percentage of 0.92%. In 2016, she ran for the presidency at the 2016 general election where she placed third, receiving a total of 24,149 votes.

== Personal life and death ==
Nawakwi was married to Geofrey Hambulo, a former Citibank banker and entrepreneur, with whom she had three children. In January 2013, one of her daughters, Hatamba Hambulo was murdered. Her dumped body was found in a manhole in Ibex Hill with her hands and legs tied.

Nawakwi died after a long illness in South Africa, on 7 April 2025, at the age of 65. Her husband, Hambulo, predeceased her on 5 December 2021.
