= Baldwin Nkumbula =

Zambian politician

Member of the National Assembly for Bweengwa
- In office 1991–1995
- Preceded by: Eli Mwanang'onze
- Succeeded by: Edgar Keembe

Minister for Youth, Sport and Child Development
- In office 1991–1992

Personal details
- Died: 27 August 1995
- Political party: MMD (until 1993); National Party (after 1993)

Baldwin Mwanakumabu Nkumbula (died 27 August 1995) was a Zambian politician and a son of veteran politician Harry Nkumbula. He served in Frederick Chiluba's Movement for Multi-Party Democracy government as Minister of Sports from 1991 until August 1992 when he resigned, citing rampant corruption. He was a co-founder of the National Party and became its president. He was also a wealthy entrepreneur and was considered a strong contender for president of Zambia.

He was married to Chifunilo Chembe and had three children; Harry Mwaanga Nkumbula, Mundusu Nkumbula and Mwanida Nkumbula.

He died in a car accident in August 1995 when the Mercedes he was driving overturned en route to Ndola from Kitwe. President Chiluba's son, Castro, and another friend Defense Minister Benjamin Yorum Mwilas' nephew Mubanga Kafuti were passengers in the vehicle and both survived the crash with injuries.
