= United Liberal Party (Zambia) =

Political party in Zambia

- Leader: Sakwiba Sikota
- Founded: July 2006
- Ideology: Liberalism

The United Liberal Party (ULP) is a political party in Zambia.

== History ==
The ULP was formed in July 2006 by Sakwiba Sikota (who was the Livingstone MP) after he lost the United Party for National Development (UPND) leadership contest in the aftermath of the death of the UPND founder, Anderson Mazoka. The ULP did not nominate a presidential candidate for the September 2006 general election, with the party president, Sikota, opting to retain his seat as the member of parliament for Livingstone. At this election, Sikota was re-elected as the Livingstone MP and the party received 2.4% of the National Assembly vote, winning three seats in parliament, with the other two seats being Lukulu West and Lukulu East.

The party supported the Movement for Multi-Party Democracy's Rupiah Banda in the 2008 presidential by-election and 2011 general election, even though he was unpopular. At the 2011 election, the ULP did not win any seats in the National Assembly after receiving just 131 votes.

In early 2024, the ULP joined the United Kwacha Alliance (UKA), an alliance of political parties, with party president Sakwiba Sikota appointed as the alliance chairperson. In December 2025, the ULP was one of the parties that founded the We are One Zambia Alliance (WOZA), also an alliance of political parties, with Sikota as the alliance chairperson. On 4 May 2026, WOZA merged into the Tonse Alliance.

== Ideologies ==
On 6 June 2012, the ULP signed onto a letter titled “Open Letter to International Donor Community to Zambia,” which argues that the sitting president at the time, President Michael Sata and the Patriotic Front caused Zambia to enter a crisis severe enough for the donor community to distrust the government’s ability to manage funds caused by nepotism. By co-signing on this letter, the ULP took a stance against corrupt policies enforced by Sata. For example, Sata often hired his relatives for positions of power, such as appointing his nephew, Alexander Chikwanda, as the minister of finance, and his other nephew, Miles Sampa, as the Deputy Minister of Finance. In addition, they have beliefs rooted in the importance of maintaining the integrity of Zambia’s checks and balances system, as the address that they co-signed expresses concern about how Sata had weakened the legislative branch. Sakwiba Sikota was the representative of the ULP that signed onto the letter.
