= Tasila Lungu =

Zambian Politician

Member of the National Assembly
- In office August 2021 – 27 November 2025
- Preceded by: Lawrence Sichalwe
- Succeeded by: Bright Nundwe
- Constituency: Chawama

Ward councillor for Nkoloma Ward
- In office August 2016 – August 2021

Personal details
- Born: Tasila Lungu; 10 May 1983 (age 42)
- Party: Patriotic Front
- Spouse: Patrick Mwansa
- Parent: Edgar Lungu (father) Esther Lungu (mother)
- Occupation: Politician

Tasila Lungu Mwansa (born May 10, 1983) is a Zambian politician and philanthropist. She is a member of the Patriotic Front and is the former Member of Parliament for Chawama.

== Biography ==
Tasila was born on May 10, 1983. At the age of 12, Tasila and her mother left Zambia for the US and returned after her father's victory in the January 2015 by-election, in which he was chosen to carry out the remainder of the late Michael Sata's term as president.

== Political career ==
Tasila contested for the position of Nkoloma ward councillor in Chawama constituency of Lusaka District at the 2016 general election and was elected. She then contested for the position of member of parliament for Chawama constituency at the 2021 general election as the Patriotic Front candidate and was elected.

In November 2025, her parliamentary seat was declared vacant by the speaker, Nelly Mutti, which meant that she wouldn't continue being the member of parliament for Chawama constituency.

== Personal life ==
In 2020, Tasila married Patrick Mwansa.
