= Kabwe District =

Coordinates: 14°20′S 28°25′E

- District
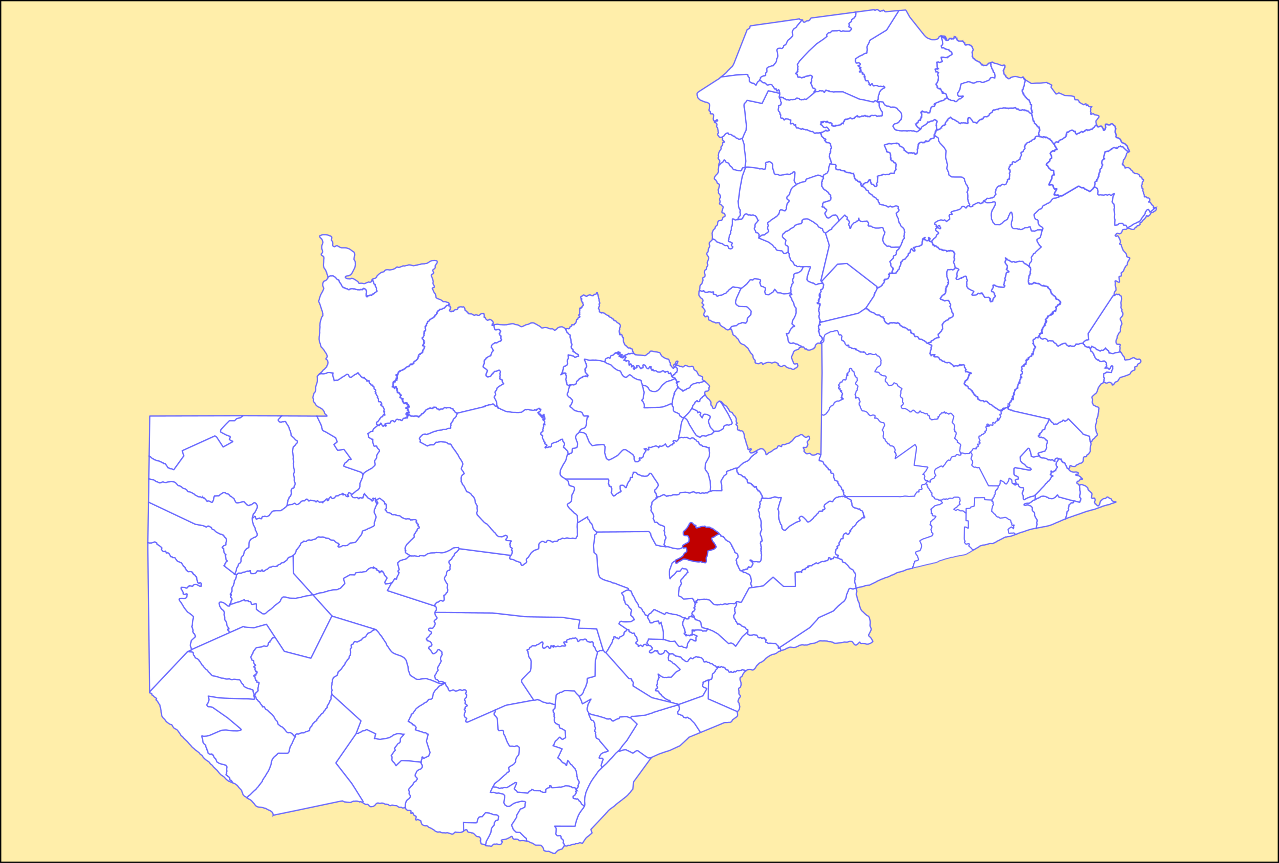
- District location in Zambia
- Country: Zambia
- Province: Central Province
- Capital: Kabwe

Area
  - Total: 1,569.6 km^{2} (606.0 sq mi)
- Elevation: 1,203 m (3,947 ft)

Population (2022)
  - Total: 299,206
  - Density: 190.63/km^{2} (493.72/sq mi)
- Time zone: UTC+2 (CAT)

Kabwe District is a district of Zambia, located in Central Province. The capital lies at Kabwe. As of the 2010 Zambian Census, the district had a population of 299,206 people. It consists of two constituencies, namely Kabwe Central and Bwacha.
