= Forum for Democracy and Development =

Political party in Zambia

- Abbreviation: FDD
- President: Chifumu Banda
- Founder: Christon Tembo
- Founded: 2001
- Split from: MMD
- Headquarters: Lusaka
- Ideology: Social democracy
- Political position: Centre-left
- National affiliation: Tonse Alliance
- Slogan: Zambia First
- National Assembly: 0 / 166

Website
- fddzambia.or.zm

The Forum for Democracy and Development (FDD) is a political party in Zambia.

== History ==
The FDD was founded in 2001 by former members of the Movement for Multi-Party Democracy (MMD), disaffected by Frederick Chiluba's efforts to change the constitution to allow him to stand for a third term. In the 2001 general elections it nominated Christon Tembo as its presidential candidate; Tembo finished third in a field of eleven candidates with 13% of the vote. In the National Assembly elections the party received 16% of the vote, winning 12 seats. Three FDD politicians were later invited by President Levy Mwanawasa to serve in a 'unity cabinet', and they were expelled from the party for accepting the invitation.

In 2005 the FDD chose Edith Nawakwi, a former MMD minister, as its president. However, in 2006 the government de-registered the FDD on the grounds that it had failed to submit an annual report. The FDD subsequently joined the United Democratic Alliance, which put forward United Party for National Development leader Hakainde Hichilema as its presidential candidate for the 2006 general elections. Hilchema finished third with 25% of the vote, whilst the UDA won 24 seats in the National Assembly, down from the combined 74 the alliance's member parties had won in 2001.

The FDD did not nominate a candidate for the 2008 presidential by-election, but put forward Nawakwi for the 2011 general elections. She received 0.2% of the vote, finishing seventh out of the nine candidates. The party won a single seat in the National Assembly, in Chasefu, represented by Chifumu Banda. Nawakwi ran for the presidency again in the 2015 presidential by-election, finishing third with 0.9% of the vote.

From 2016 to 2021, the FDD held one seat in the National Assembly, in Chiengi, represented by Given Katuta Mwelwa. The party did not win any seats in the 2021 general election.

In January 2025, the FDD decided to join the Tonse Alliance, an alliance of political parties. After the death of Edith Nawakwi in April 2025, Chifumu Banda (who was the vice-president of the party and former Chasefu MP) took over as the president of the FDD.

In December 2025, after the resignation of the New Congress Party from the Tonse Alliance, it was announced that the Tonse Alliance members made a decision to use the Forum for Democracy and Development (FDD) to field their candidate for the by-election scheduled for the following month in Chawama Constituency and for any other upcoming by-election. The 2026 Chawama by-election took place on 15 January 2026, with Bright Nundwe as the FDD candidate. Nundwe was elected as the Chawama MP in a field of nine candidates, giving the FDD a seat in Parliament.

In March 2026, a convention took place in which Chifumu Banda was chosen as the party president (no-longer acting president). The Tonse Alliance held a convention in which Brian Mundubile was chosen as their 2026 general election presidential candidate and it was agreed that the FDD would be the party used for candidacy by the alliance at that election.

On 16 May 2026, it was reported that one of the FDD members took the party to court over the convention and agreement that placed Brian Mundubile as the presidential candidate of the party and Mundubile agreed to use a different party from within the Tonse Alliance at the August 2026 general election, indicating that the FDD will not be used by the Tonse Alliance at the election.

== Electoral history ==
=== Presidential elections ===
Election	Party candidate	Votes	%	Result
2001	Christon Tembo	228,861	13.17%	Lost ✗
2006	Supported Hakainde Hichilema (UDA)	693,772	25.32%	Lost ✗
2011	Edith Nawakwi	6,833	0.24%	Lost ✗
2015	Edith Nawakwi	15,321	0.92%	Lost ✗
2016	Edith Nawakwi	24,149	0.65%	Lost ✗

=== National Assembly elections ===
Election	Party leader	Votes	%	Seats	+/–	Position	Outcome
2001	Christon Tembo	272,817	15.58%	12 / 159	▲12	▲3rd	Opposition
2006	Edith Nawakwi	610,608 as part of UDA	22.51%	26 / 159	▲14	3rd	Opposition
2011	Edith Nawakwi	20,243	0.75%	1 / 159	▼25	▼5th	Opposition
2016	Edith Nawakwi	79,489	2.17%	1 / 156	Steady	▲4th	Opposition
2021	Edith Nawakwi	4,006	0.08%	0 / 167	▼1	▼8th	Extra-parliamentary
