= Chifunabuli District =

- District
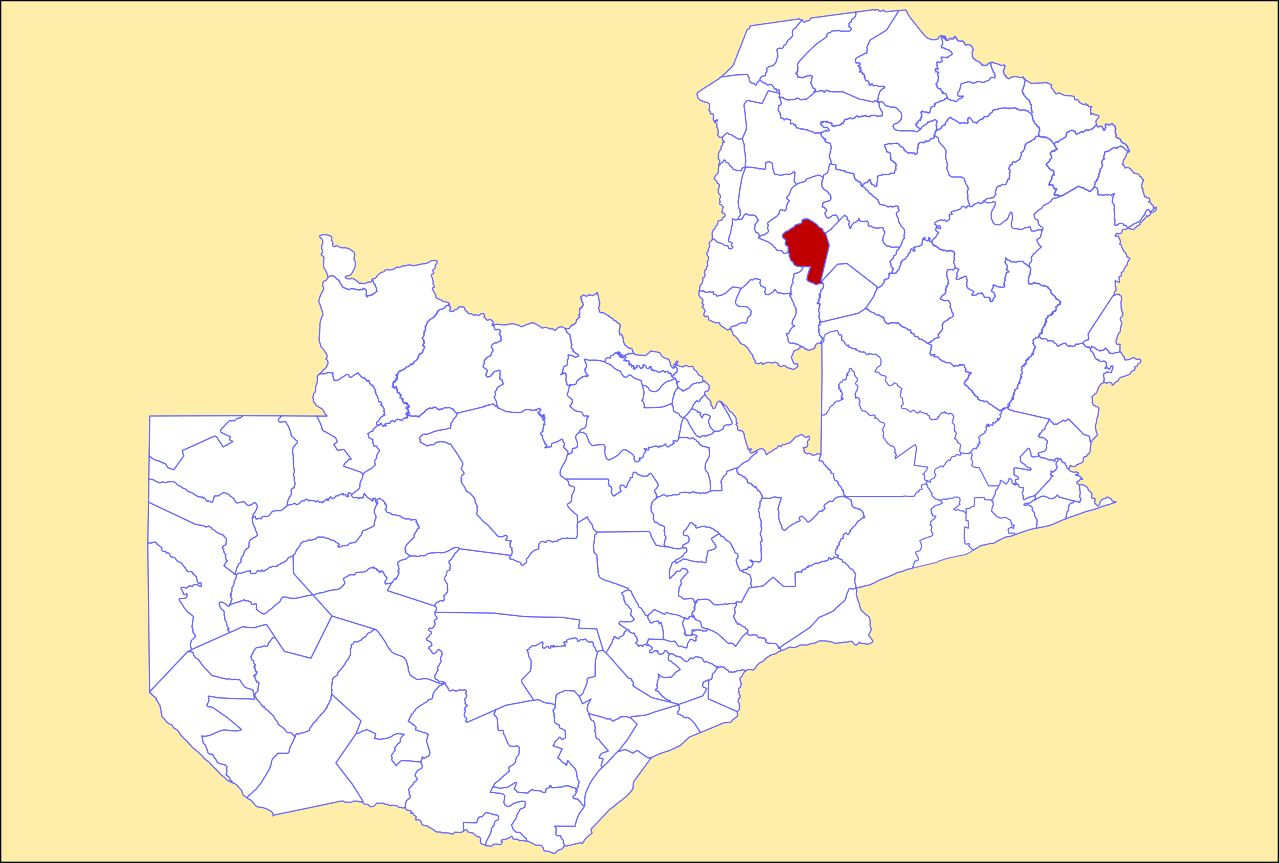
- District location in Zambia
- Country: Zambia
- Province: Luapula Province
- Capital: Lubwe

Area
  - Total: 3,094.8 km^{2} (1,194.9 sq mi)

Population (2022)
  - Total: 116,326
  - Density: 37.588/km^{2} (97.351/sq mi)
- Time zone: UTC+2 (CAT)

Chifunabuli District is a district of Luapula Province, Zambia. It was created in 2018 by splitting Samfya District. As of the 2022 Zambian Census, the district had a population of 116,326 people.
