= Christon Tembo =

Zambian politician

Lieutenant General Christon Tembo

6th Vice-President of Zambia
- In office 2 December 1997 – April 2001
- President: Frederick Chiluba
- Preceded by: Godfrey Miyanda
- Succeeded by: Enoch Kavindele

Personal details
- Born: 24 May 1944
- Died: 6 March 2009 (aged 64)
- Party: Movement for Multi-Party Democracy
- Other political affiliations: Forum for Democracy and Development

Lt. Gen. Christon Tembo (24 May 1944 – 6 March 2009) was a Zambian politician and army commander. He was Minister of Foreign Affairs from 1995 to 1996 and the sixth vice-president of Zambia from 1997 to 2001. He ran for president in the December 2001 election and took third place, with about 13% of the vote.

In 1989, he and others were charged with plotting to overthrow President Kenneth Kaunda, which was judged as an act of treason worthy of the death penalty. He was defended in court successfully by attorney Levy Mwanawasa, who was elected as president in December 2001.

He retired from military service in 1990 and joined the Movement for Multiparty Democracy as vice-president of the party under Frederick Chiluba, who became president in 1991. He fell out with Chiluba over the latter's attempt to gain a third term in office in 2001 and then formed the Forum for Democracy and Development (FDD) as a breakaway party, which he led until his death.

He died on March 6, 2009, in Lusaka.

Political offices
Preceded by Godfrey Miyanda	Vice-President of Zambia; 1997–2001	Succeeded by Enoch Kavindele
