= National Party (Zambia) =

Political party in Zambia

The National Party is a political party in Zambia.

== History ==
The party was established in August 1993 by a group of nine MPs who had left the Movement for Multi-Party Democracy after the government refused to investigate corruption allegations against senior ministers. The new party won five of the by-elections forced by their resignations from the MMD.

Former minister Humphrey Mulemba was the party's presidential candidate in the 1996 general elections, finishing third in a field of five candidates with 7% of the vote. In the parliamentary elections the party nominated 98 candidates, receiving 7% of the vote and winning five seats in the National Assembly, making it the largest opposition party amidst a United National Independence Party boycott.

In 2000 Sam Chipungu was elected party president. In the 2001 general elections it did not run a presidential candidate, but supported Anderson Mazoka of the United Party for National Development, who finished as runner-up. In the parliamentary elections it received just 0.07% of the vote and failed to win a seat, having disintegrated after the death of Mulemba in 1998 and interim leader Daniel Lisulo in 2000.

In 2011 National Party leader Richard Kambulu contested a single seat in the parliamentary elections, receiving only 193 votes (0.01%). Kambulu also considered running for the 2015 presidential elections but opted not to.
