= United Democratic Alliance (Zambia) =

- Leader: Hakainde Hichilema
- Founded: 1 March 2006
- Dissolved: 2008
- Headquarters: Lusaka
- Ideology: Liberalism; Progressivism; Social liberalism
- Political position: Centre

The United Democratic Alliance (UDA) was a political alliance in Zambia formed to contest the 2006 general elections.

== History ==
The UDA was formed on 1 March 2006 by the United Party for National Development (UPND), the United National Independence Party (UNIP) and the Forum for Democracy and Development, which between them had won 74 of the 150 elected seats in the National Assembly in the 2001 elections. Anderson Mazoka, who had finished as runner-up in the presidential elections, was the alliance's leader until his death in May 2006. He was succeeded by Hakainde Hichilema, also of the UPND.

In the 2006 elections Hichilema finished third out of the five presidential candidates with 25% of the vote. In the National Assembly elections the alliance received 23% of the vote, winning 26 seats.

The alliance was dissolved in 2008.

== Election results ==
=== President ===
Election	Candidate	Votes	%	Result
2006	Hakainde Hichilema	693,772	25.32%	Lost ✗

=== National Assembly ===
Election	Leader	Votes	%	Seats	+/–	Position	Government
2006	Hakainde Hichilema	610,608	22.51%	26 / 159	▼48	▼3rd	Opposition
