= 1991 Zambian general election =

- Presidential election
- 31 October 1991
- Turnout: 45.31%
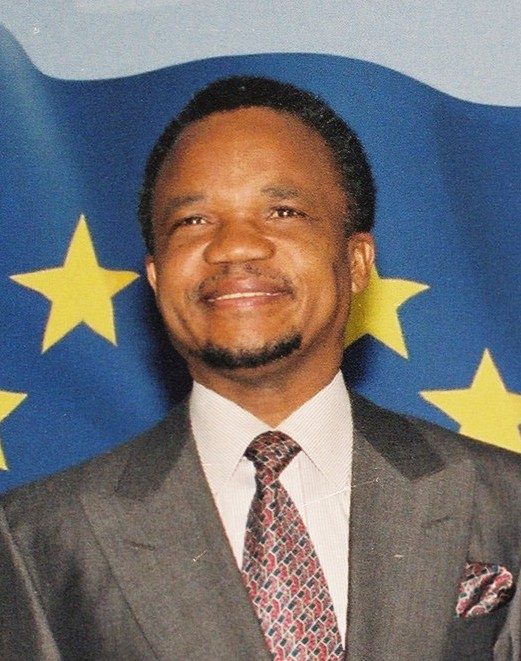

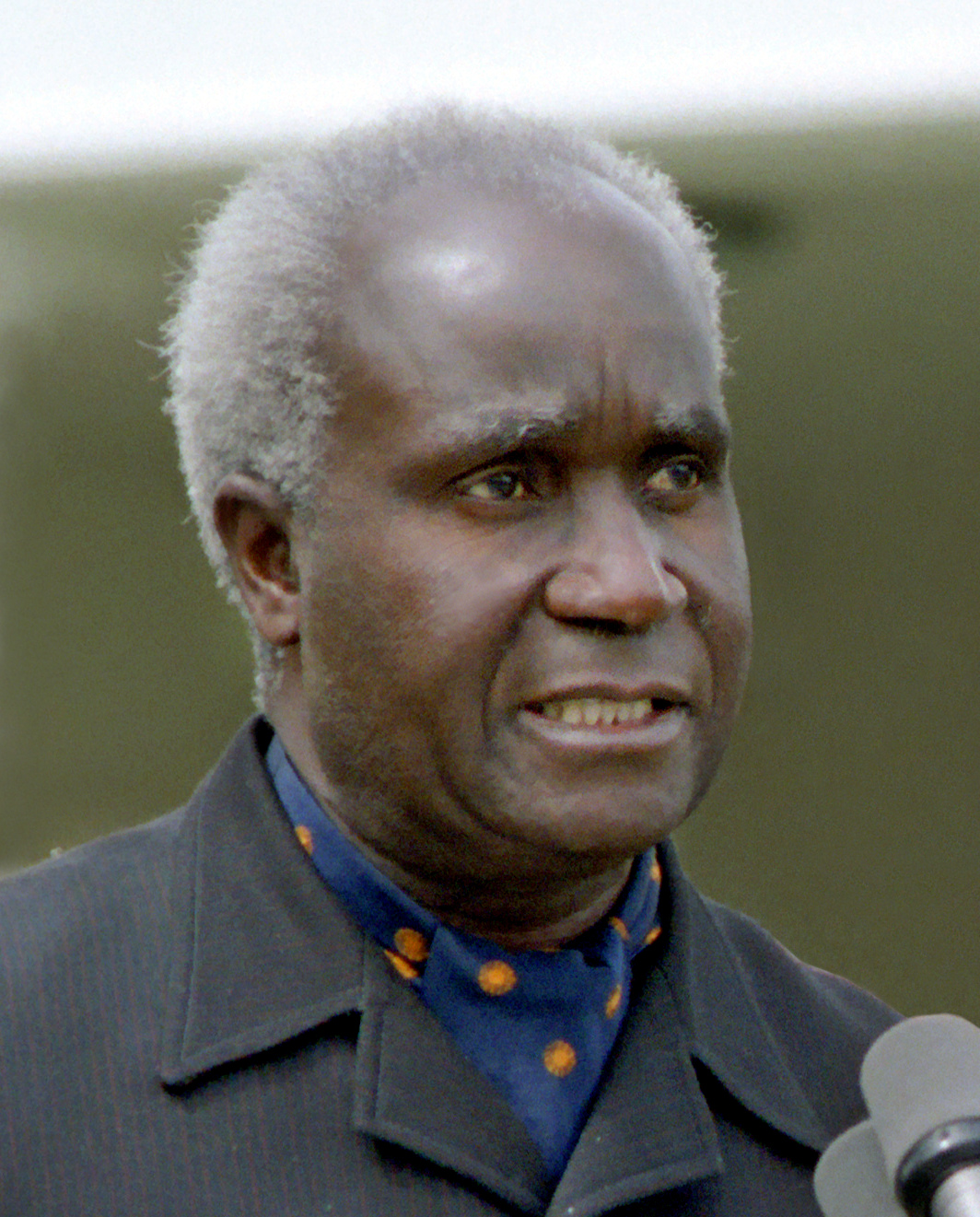
Nominee	Frederick Chiluba	Kenneth Kaunda
Party	MMD	UNIP
Popular vote	972,605	311,022
Percentage	75.77%	24.23%
- Results by National Assembly constituency
President before election
Kenneth Kaunda
UNIP
Elected President
Frederick Chiluba
MMD

General elections were held in Zambia on 31 October 1991 to elect a President and National Assembly. They were the first multi-party elections since 1968, and only the second multi-party elections since independence in 1964. The United National Independence Party (UNIP), which had led the country since independence (from 1973 to 1990 as the sole legal party), was comprehensively beaten by the Movement for Multi-Party Democracy (MMD). Kenneth Kaunda, who had been president since independence, was defeated in a landslide by MMD challenger Frederick Chiluba in the presidential elections, whilst the MMD won 125 of the 150 elected seats in the expanded National Assembly. Voter turnout was 45%.

== Background ==
In 1973 Kaunda had declared UNIP the only legally permitted party in Zambia. From then until 1990, the government and UNIP were effectively one. Every five years, Kaunda was automatically elected to a five-year term as president by virtue of being leader of UNIP. Voters also chose between three UNIP candidates for each of the 125 seats in the National Assembly.

However, by the summer of 1990 discontent had built to a fever pitch. In July, following three days of riots in Lusaka, Kaunda announced a referendum on the single-party system would be held in October. This was not enough to prevent disgruntled army officer Mwamba Luchembe from launching a coup attempt within a few hours of the announcement. However, it was broken after about three to four hours. After the coup attempt, the opposition contended that the original date for the referendum did not allow enough time to register voters. In response, Kaunda delayed the referendum until August 1991.

Kaunda had vehemently opposed a multiparty system, claiming it would cause violence and inflame tribal divisions. However, in response to demands from the opposition, he cancelled the referendum in September and instead gave his support to constitutional amendments that would end UNIP's monopoly on power. He also announced that the general elections scheduled for 1993 would be brought forward to 1991. Kaunda signed the necessary amendments into law in December. Soon afterward, the Movement for Multi-Party Democracy, a pressure group created earlier in the year under the leadership of Zambia Congress of Trade Unions chairman Chiluba, registered as a political party.

== Results ==
=== President ===
Candidate	Party	Votes	%
Frederick Chiluba	Movement for Multi-Party Democracy	972,605	75.77
Kenneth Kaunda	United National Independence Party	311,022	24.23
Total		1,283,627	100.00
Valid votes		1,283,627	96.87
Invalid/blank votes		41,531	3.13
Total votes		1,325,158	100.00
Registered voters/turnout		2,924,505	45.31
Source: Electoral Commission

=== National Assembly ===
Party	Votes	%	Seats	+/–
Movement for Multi-Party Democracy	935,705	74.02	125	New
United National Independence Party	315,758	24.98	25	–100
National Democratic Alliance	1,695	0.13	0	New
National Democratic Party	803	0.06	0	New
Democratic Party	120	0.01	0	New
Independents	10,091	0.80	0	New
Presidential appointees			8	–2
Appointed Speaker			1	0
Total	1,264,172	100.00	159	+23
Valid votes	1,264,172	96.50		
Invalid/blank votes	45,903	3.50		
Total votes	1,310,075	100.00		
Registered voters/turnout	2,879,111	45.50		
Source: Electoral Commission

== See also ==
- List of members of the National Assembly of Zambia (1991–96)
