= 2006 Zambian general election =

- 28 September 2006
- Presidential election
- Registered: 3,941,229
- Turnout: 69.52% (▲2.80 pp)
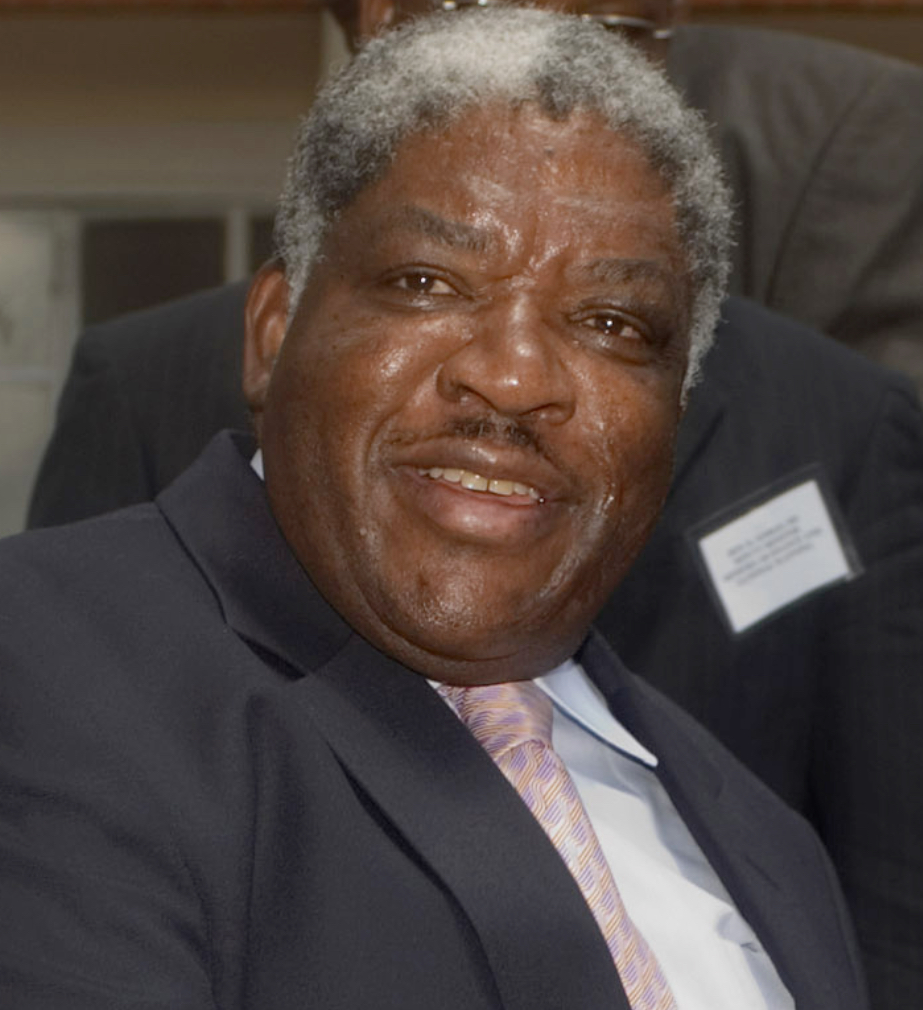

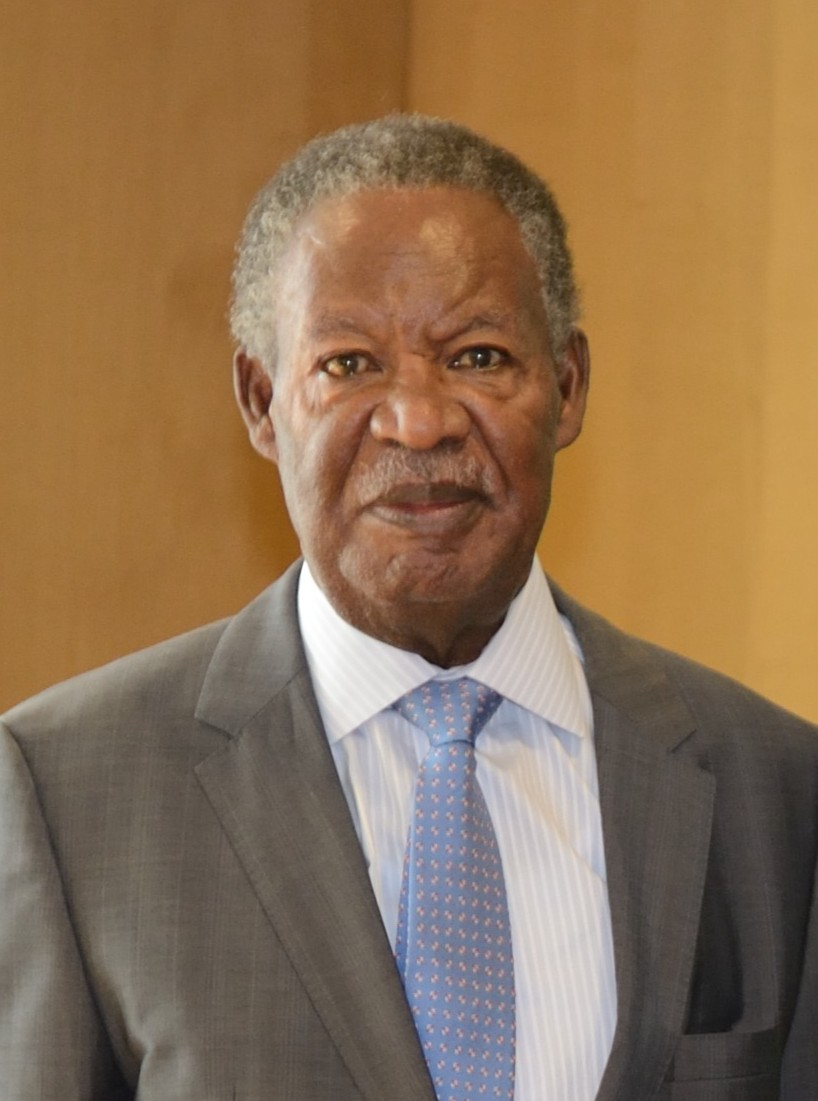

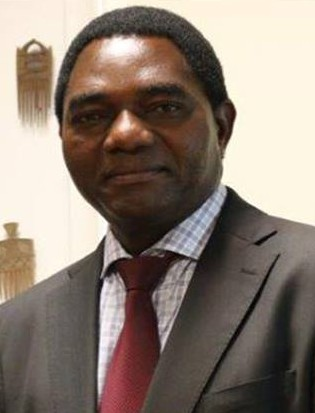
Nominee	Levy Mwanawasa	Michael Sata	Hakainde Hichilema
Party	MMD	PF	UPND
Alliance			UDA
Popular vote	1,177,846	804,748	693,772
Percentage	42.98%	29.37%	25.32%
President before election
Levy Mwanawasa
MMD
Elected President
Levy Mwanawasa
MMD
- Parliamentary election
- 150 of the 159 seats in the National Assembly; 80 seats needed for a majority
- Turnout: 71.21% (▲2.66 pp)
Party	Leader	Vote %	Seats	+/–
MMD	Levy Mwanawasa	39.05	72	+3
PF	Michael Sata	22.96	43	+42
UDA	Hakainde Hichilema	22.51	26	−48
ULP	Sakwiba Sikota	2.42	3	New
NDF	–	1.06	1	0
Independents	–	9.48	3	+2
This lists parties that won seats. See the complete results below.
Speaker of the National Assembly before	Speaker of the National Assembly after
Amusaa Mwanamwambwa; MMD	Amusaa Mwanamwambwa; MMD

General elections were held in Zambia on 28 September 2006 to elect a President, members of the National Assembly and local government councillors. The result was a victory for the ruling Movement for Multi-Party Democracy, which won 75 of the 150 National Assembly seats and whose candidate, Levy Mwanawasa, won the presidential vote. Voter turnout was just over 70%.

== Campaign ==
During the campaign, Patriotic Front leader Michael Sata was strongly critical of Chinese investment in the country and suggested that he would recognize the Republic of China (Taiwan). One opinion poll in September gave Sata a considerable lead over Mwanawasa, 52% to 27%, with Hakainde Hichilema in third place at 20%, but Mwanawasa questioned these results. Another poll earlier in the month gave Mwanawasa the lead with 33% to Sata's 24%, although this marked a drop from the 45% reported for Mwanawasa by a previous poll in August, and an increase for Sata, who had been at 15%.

Former president Kenneth Kaunda backed Hichilema and expressed disapproval for Sata. Former president Frederick Chiluba urged people to vote for Sata.

The possibility was raised that Sata could be disqualified from the election for allegedly giving a false declaration of assets in August; he had claimed that a former minister in Mwanawasa's government owed him $100,000.

== Results ==
The winner of the presidential elections was determined in one round according to the first-past-the-post system. Initial results from the election gave Sata the lead, but further results put Mwanawasa in first place and pushed Sata into third place. Interim results released after votes from 120 of 150 constituencies were counted put Mwanawasa on just over 42% of the vote; Hakainda Hichilema had 28%; and Michael Sata had slipped to 27%. When opposition supporters heard that Sata had slipped from first to third place, riots erupted in Lusaka. According to interim results Mwanawasa still held an easy lead in constituencies counted up to 16:00 on 1 October.

Late in the afternoon of 2 October, the Zambian Electoral Commission announced that Mwanawasa had officially won the election with 43% of the vote; Sata took second place with 29% and Hichilema took third place with 25%. He was sworn in for another term on 3 October.

The total electorate was 3,941,229 and 2,789,114 votes were cast of which 48,936 were spoilt. Voter turnout was 70.77%.

=== President ===
Candidate	Party	Votes	%
Levy Mwanawasa	Movement for Multi-Party Democracy	1,177,846	42.98
Michael Sata	Patriotic Front	804,748	29.37
Hakainde Hichilema	United Democratic Alliance	693,772	25.32
Godfrey Miyanda	Heritage Party	42,918	1.57
Winwright Ngondo	All Peoples' Congress Party	20,894	0.76
Total		2,740,178	100.00
Valid votes		2,740,178	98.33
Invalid/blank votes		46,479	1.67
Total votes		2,786,657	100.00
Registered voters/turnout		3,941,229	70.71
Source: Electoral Commission

=== National Assembly ===
The elections in Lupososhi (19,230 registered voters) and Kabompo East (16,148) were postponed due to the death of candidates. Both seats were won by the MMD when the delayed elections were held.

Party	Votes	%	Seats	+/–
Movement for Multi-Party Democracy	1,059,526	39.05	72	+3
Patriotic Front	622,864	22.96	43	+42
United Democratic Alliance	610,608	22.51	26	–48
United Liberal Party	65,745	2.42	3	New
Heritage Party	34,872	1.29	0	–4
National Democratic Focus	28,805	1.06	1	0
All Peoples' Congress Party	19,991	0.74	0	New
Reform Party	7,349	0.27	0	New
Party for Unity, Democracy and Development	3,914	0.14	0	New
New Generation Party	1,259	0.05	0	New
Zambia Democratic Congress	475	0.02	0	–
Federal Democratic Party	300	0.01	0	New
Direct Democracy Movement	271	0.01	0	New
Independents	257,186	9.48	3	+2
Vacant			2	–
Presidential appointees			8	0
Appointed speaker			1	0
Total	2,713,165	100.00	159	0
Valid votes	2,713,165	97.55		
Invalid/blank votes	68,195	2.45		
Total votes	2,781,360	100.00		
Registered voters/turnout	3,905,851	71.21		
Source: Electoral Commission

== See also ==
- List of members of the National Assembly of Zambia (2006–11)
