= List of members of the National Assembly of Zambia (2016–2021) =

The members of the National Assembly of Zambia from 2016 until 2021 were elected on 11 August 2016. They consisted of 156 elected members, eight members appointed by the President, the Speaker and the Vice-President. The elected members included 80 from the Patriotic Front, 58 from the United Party for National Development, three from the Movement for Multi-Party Democracy, one from the Forum for Democracy and Development and 14 independents.

== List of members ==
=== Elected members ===
Constituency	Member	Party
Bahati	Harry Kalaba	Patriotic Front
Bangweulu	Anthony Kasandwe	Patriotic Front
Bwacha	Sydney Mushanga	Patriotic Front
Bwana Mkubwa	Jonas Chanda	Patriotic Front
Bweengwa	Kasautu Michelo	United Party for National Development
Chadiza	Salatiel Tembo	Patriotic Front
Chama North	Darious Mumba	Patriotic Front
Chama South	Davison Mung'andu	Patriotic Front
Chasefu	Gerald Zimba	Patriotic Front
Chavuma	Victor Lumayi	United Party for National Development
Chawama	Lawrence Sichalwe	Patriotic Front
Chembe	Sebastian Kopulande	Patriotic Front
Chiengi	Given Katuta	Forum for Democracy and Development
Chifubu	Frank Ng'ambi	Patriotic Front
Chifunabuli	Ponde Mecha	Patriotic Front
Chikankata	Kabwe Mwiinga	United Party for National Development
Chilanga	Keith Mukata	United Party for National Development
Chililabombwe	Richard Musukwa	Patriotic Front
Chilubi	Rosaria Fundanga	Patriotic Front
Chimbamilonga	Hastings Chansa	Patriotic Front
Chimwemwe	Elias Mwila	Independent
Chingola	Mathew Nkhuwa	Patriotic Front
Chinsali	Kalalwe Mukosa	Patriotic Front
Chipangali	Vincent Mwale	Patriotic Front
Chipata Central	Moses Mawere	Patriotic Front
Chipili	Jewis Chabi	Independent
Chirundu	Douglas Syakalima	United Party for National Development
Chisamba	Chushi Kasanda	United Party for National Development
Chitambo	Remember Mutale	Patriotic Front
Choma	Cornelius Mweetwa	United Party for National Development
Chongwe	Japhen Mwakalombe	Patriotic Front
Dundumwenzi	Edgar Sing'ombe	United Party for National Development
Feira	Stephen Miti	Independent
Gwembe	Attractor Chisangano	United Party for National Development
Ikeleng'i	Elijah Muchima	United Party for National Development
Isoka	Sichone Malozo	Patriotic Front
Itezhi-Tezhi	Herbert Shabula	United Party for National Development
Kabompo	Ambrose Lufuma	United Party for National Development
Kabushi	Bowman Lusambo	Patriotic Front
Kabwata	Given Lubinda	Patriotic Front
Kabwe Central	Tutwa Ngulube	Patriotic Front
Kafue	Mirriam Chonya	United Party for National Development
Kafulafuta	Joseph Kabamba	Patriotic Front
Kalabo Central	Chinga Miyutu	United Party for National Development
Kalomo Central	Harry Kamboni	United Party for National Development
Kalulushi	Kampamba Mulenga	Patriotic Front
Kamfinsa	Elalio Musonda	Patriotic Front
Kanchibiya	Martin Malama	Patriotic Front
Kankoyo	Brian Mushimba	Patriotic Front
Kantanshi	Anthony Mumba	Independent
Kanyama	Elizabeth Phiri	Patriotic Front
Kaoma Central	Morgan Sitwala	United Party for National Development
Kapiri Mposhi	Stanley Kakubo	United Party for National Development
Kapoche	Charles Romel Banda	Patriotic Front
Kaputa	Maxas Ng'onga	Patriotic Front
Kasama Central	Kelvin Sampa	Patriotic Front
Kasempa	Brenda Tambatamba	United Party for National Development
Kasenengwa	Victoria Kalima	Patriotic Front
Katombola	Derick Livune	United Party for National Development
Katuba	Patricia Mwashingwele	United Party for National Development
Kaumbwe	Listed Tembo	Patriotic Front
Kawambwa	Nickson Chilangwa	Patriotic Front
Keembe	Princess Kasune	United Party for National Development
Kwacha	Joseph Malanji	Patriotic Front
Liuwa	Situmbeko Musokotwane	United Party for National Development
Livingstone	Mathews Jere	United Party for National Development
Luampa	Makozo Chikote	United Party for National Development
Luangeni	Charles Zulu	Patriotic Front
Luanshya	Stephen Chungu	Patriotic Front
Luapula	Emerine Kabanshi	Patriotic Front
Lubansenshi	George Mwamba	Patriotic Front
Luena	David Kundoti	United Party for National Development
Lufubu	Gift Chiyalika	Patriotic Front
Lufwanyama	Leonard Fungulwe	United Party for National Development
Lukashya	Mwenya Munkonge	Independent
Lukulu East	Christopher Kalila	United Party for National Development
Lumezi	Pilila Jere	Independent
Lundazi	Lawrence Nyirenda	Independent
Lunte	Mutotwe Kafwaya	Patriotic Front
Lupososhi	Lazarous Chungu	Patriotic Front
Lusaka Central	Margaret Mwanakatwe	Patriotic Front
Mafinga	Jacob Siwale	Patriotic Front
Magoye	Emmerson Machila	United Party for National Development
Malambo	Makebi Zulu	Patriotic Front
Malole	Christopher Yaluma	Patriotic Front
Mambilima	Dennis Wanchinga	Patriotic Front
Mandevu	Jean Kapata	Patriotic Front
Mangango	Naluwa Mwene	United Party for National Development
Mansa Central	Chitalu Chilufya	Patriotic Front
Manyinga	Robert Lihefu	United Party for National Development
Mapatizya	Clive Miyanda	United Party for National Development
Masaiti	Micheal Zondani Katambo	Patriotic Front
Matero	Lloyd Kaziya	Patriotic Front
Mazabuka Central	Gary Nkombo	United Party for National Development
Mbabala	Ephraim Belemu	United Party for National Development
Mbala	Mwalimu Simfukwe	Patriotic Front
Mfuwe	Mwimba Malama	Patriotic Front
Milanzi	Whiteson Banda	Patriotic Front
Milenge	Mwansa Mbulakulima	Patriotic Front
Mitete	Misheck Mutelo	United Party for National Development
Mkaika	Peter Phiri	Movement for Multi-Party Democracy
Mkushi North	Doreen Mwape	Patriotic Front
Mkushi South	Davies Chisopa	Patriotic Front
Mongu Central	Mwilola Imakando	United Party for National Development
Monze	Jacob Mwiimbu	United Party for National Development
Moomba	Fred Chaatila	United Party for National Development
Mpika Central	Sylvia Chalikosa	Patriotic Front
Mpongwe	Rasfold Bulaya	United Party for National Development
Mporokoso	Brian Mundubile	Patriotic Front
Mpulungu	Chomba Sikazwe	Patriotic Front
Msanzala	Peter Daka	Patriotic Front
Muchinga	Howard Kunda	Movement for Multi-Party Democracy
Mufulira	Evans Chibanda	Patriotic Front
Mufumbwe	Elliot Kamondo	United Party for National Development
Mulobezi	Alfred Mandumbwa	Independent
Mumbwa	Credo Nanjuwa	United Party for National Development
Munali	Nkandu Luo	Patriotic Front
Mwandi	Sililo Mutaba	United Party for National Development
Mwansabombwe	Rodgers Mwewa	Patriotic Front
Mwembeshi	Machila Jamba	Independent
Mwense	David Mabumba	Patriotic Front
Mwinilunga	Newton Samakayi	United Party for National Development
Nakonde	Yizukanji Siwanzi	Patriotic Front
Nalikwanda	Geoffrey Lungwangwa	United Party for National Development
Nalolo	George Imbuwa	Independent
Namwala	Moono Lubezhi	United Party for National Development
Nangoma	Boyd Hamusonde	Independent
Nchanga	Chilombo Chali	Patriotic Front
Nchelenge	Anthony Malama	Patriotic Front
Ndola Central	Emmanuel Mulenga	Patriotic Front
Nkana	Alexander Chiteme	Patriotic Front
Nkeyema	Kapelwa Mbangweta	United Party for National Development
Nyimba	Olipa Phiri	Patriotic Front
Pambashe	Ronald Chitotela	Patriotic Front
Pemba	Mutinta Mazoka	United Party for National Development
Petauke Central	Dora Siliya	Patriotic Front
Roan	Chishimba Kambwili	Patriotic Front
Rufunsa	Sheal Mulyata	United Party for National Development
Senanga	Mukumbuta Mulowa	United Party for National Development
Senga Hill	Kapembwa Simbao	Patriotic Front
Serenje	Maxwell Kabanda	Movement for Multi-Party Democracy
Sesheke	Frank Kufakwandi	United Party for National Development
Shang'ombo	Mubika Mubika	United Party for National Development
Shiwa Ngandu	Stephen Kampyongo	Patriotic Front
Siavonga	Darius Mulunda	United Party for National Development
Sikongo	Mundia Ndalamei	United Party for National Development
Sinazongwe	Gift Sialubalo	United Party for National Development
Sinda	Masautso Tembo	Independent
Sioma	Mbololwa Subulwa	Independent
Solwezi Central	Stafford Mulusa	United Party for National Development
Solwezi East	Leaky Kintu	United Party for National Development
Solwezi West	Teddy Kasonso	United Party for National Development
Vubwi	Margaret Miti	Patriotic Front
Wusakile	Pavyuma Kalobo	Independent
Zambezi East	Brian Kambita	United Party for National Development
Zambezi West	Prisca Kucheka	United Party for National Development

=== Non-elected members ===
Type	Member	Party
Nominated	Davies Chama	Patriotic Front
Nominated	Edify Mukambala Hamukale	Patriotic Front
Nominated	Richard Kapita	Patriotic Front
Nominated	Nathaniel Mubukwanu	Patriotic Front
Nominated	Felix Mutati	Movement for Multi-Party Democracy
Nominated	Joyce Nonde-Simukoko	Patriotic Front
Nominated	Godfridah Sumaili	Patriotic Front
Nominated	Catherine Namugala	Movement for Multi-Party Democracy
Speaker	Patrick Matibini	Independent
Vice-President	Inonge Wina	Patriotic Front
