= List of members of the National Assembly of Zambia (2002–2006) =

The members of the National Assembly of Zambia from 2002 until 2006 were elected on 27 December 2001. Of the 150 elected members, 69 were from the Movement for Multi-Party Democracy, 49 from the United Party for National Development, thirteen from the United National Independence Party, twelve from the Forum for Democracy and Development, four from the Heritage Party and one from the Patriotic Front and Zambia Republican Party, together with one independent. The newly elected National Assembly convened for the first time on 25 January 2002.

== List of members ==
=== Elected members ===
Constituency	Member	Party
Bahati	Emmanuel Chungu	Movement for Multi-Party Democracy
Bangweulu	Joseph Kasongo	Independent
Bwacha	Gladys Nyirongo	Heritage Party
Bwana Mkubwa	Paul Katema	Movement for Multi-Party Democracy
Bweengwa	Japhet Moonde	United Party for National Development
Chadiza	Phillip Zulu	United National Independence Party
Chama North	John Chibanga	United National Independence Party
Chama South	John Ng'uni	United National Independence Party
Chasefu	Yotam Banda	United National Independence Party
Chavuma	Sakachamba Chitanga	United Party for National Development
Chawama	Geoffrey Samukonga	Forum for Democracy and Development
Chembe	Mumba Sokontwe	Movement for Multi-Party Democracy
Chiengi	Katele Kalumba	Movement for Multi-Party Democracy
Chifubu	Mathew Mulanda	Movement for Multi-Party Democracy
Chifunabuli	Kennedy Sakeni	Movement for Multi-Party Democracy
Chikankata	Amos Nakalonga	United Party for National Development
Chilanga	Cosmas Moono	United Party for National Development
Chililabombwe	Wamundila Muliokela	Movement for Multi-Party Democracy
Chilubi	Chola Chisupa	Movement for Multi-Party Democracy
Chimbamilonga	Bishop Sakalani	Movement for Multi-Party Democracy
Chimwemwe	Willie Nsanda	Movement for Multi-Party Democracy
Chingola	Severine Chilufya	Movement for Multi-Party Democracy
Chinsali	Alex Musanya	Movement for Multi-Party Democracy
Chipangali	Lucas Phiri	United National Independence Party
Chipata Central	Mathew Mwale	Forum for Democracy and Development
Chipili	Jason Mfula	Movement for Multi-Party Democracy
Chisamba	Jethro Masowe	United Party for National Development
Chitambo	Gunstone Chola	Movement for Multi-Party Democracy
Choma	Jesse Muleya	United Party for National Development
Chongwe	Sylvia Masebo	Zambia Republican Party
Dundumwenzi	Emmerson Mudenda	United Party for National Development
Feira	Patrick Ngoma	Movement for Multi-Party Democracy
Gwembe	Brian Ntundu	United Party for National Development
Isoka East	Catherine Namugala	Movement for Multi-Party Democracy
Isoka West	Harry Sinkala	Movement for Multi-Party Democracy
Itezhi-Tezhi	Bates Namuyamba	Movement for Multi-Party Democracy
Kabompo East	Lucas Chikoti	United Party for National Development
Kabompo West	Enoch Kavindele	Movement for Multi-Party Democracy
Kabushi	Nedson Nzowa	Heritage Party
Kabwata	Given Lubinda	United Party for National Development
Kabwe Central	Patrick Musonda	Heritage Party
Kafue	Robert Sichinga	United Party for National Development
Kafulafuta	George Mpombo	Movement for Multi-Party Democracy
Kalabo	Queen Kakoma	United Party for National Development
Kalomo Central	Request Muntanga	United Party for National Development
Kalulushi	Chitalu Sampa	Movement for Multi-Party Democracy
Kamfinsa	Webster Chipili	Movement for Multi-Party Democracy
Kanchibiya	Judith Kangoma	Movement for Multi-Party Democracy
Kankoyo	Fidelis Chisala	Movement for Multi-Party Democracy
Kantanshi	Danny Kombe	Movement for Multi-Party Democracy
Kanyama	Henry Mtonga	United Party for National Development
Kaoma Central	Austin Liato	United Party for National Development
Kapiri Mposhi	John Mwaimba	Movement for Multi-Party Democracy
Kapoche	Charles Banda	Forum for Democracy and Development
Kaputa	Mutale Nalumango	Movement for Multi-Party Democracy
Kasama Central	Tresphor Bwalya	Movement for Multi-Party Democracy
Kasempa	Patrick Kafumukache	Movement for Multi-Party Democracy
Kasenengwa	Timothy Nyirenda	United National Independence Party
Katombola	Regina Musokotwane	United Party for National Development
Katuba	Jonas Shakafuswa	United Party for National Development
Kawambwa	Afrika Chungu	Movement for Multi-Party Democracy
Keembe	Lackson Mapushi	Movement for Multi-Party Democracy
Kwacha	Eugine Appel	Movement for Multi-Party Democracy
Liuwa	Bataba Wamulume	United Party for National Development
Livingstone	Sakwiba Sikota	United Party for National Development
Luampa	Stephen Manjata	Movement for Multi-Party Democracy
Luangeni	Besnat Jere	United National Independence Party
Luanshya	Roy Chulumanda	Movement for Multi-Party Democracy
Luapula	Peter Machungwa	Movement for Multi-Party Democracy
Lubansenshi	Andrew Mulenga	Movement for Multi-Party Democracy
Luena	Crispin Sibetta	United Party for National Development
Lufwanyama	Goodson Mulilo	Movement for Multi-Party Democracy
Lukashya	Augustine Mwape	Movement for Multi-Party Democracy
Lukulu East	Batuke Imenda	United Party for National Development
Lukulu West	Simasiku Namakando	Movement for Multi-Party Democracy
Lumezi	Dickson Zulu	United National Independence Party
Lundazi	Mkhondo Lungu	United National Independence Party
Lunte	Felix Mutati	Movement for Multi-Party Democracy
Lupososhi	Emmanuel Mpakata	Patriotic Front
Lusaka Central	Dipak Patel	Forum for Democracy and Development
Magoye	Andrew Haakaloba	United Party for National Development
Malambo	Imange Phiri	United National Independence Party
Malole	Sebio Mukuka	Movement for Multi-Party Democracy
Mambilima	Patrick Kalifungwa	Movement for Multi-Party Democracy
Mandevu	Patricia Nawa	Forum for Democracy and Development
Mangango	Chrispin Shumina	Forum for Democracy and Development
Mansa	Justin Chilufya	Movement for Multi-Party Democracy
Mapatizya	Grace Sialumba	United Party for National Development
Masaiti	Marina Nsingo	Movement for Multi-Party Democracy
Matero	Chance Kabaghe	Forum for Democracy and Development
Mazabuka	Griffiths Nangomba	United Party for National Development
Mbabala	Emmanuel Hachipuka	United Party for National Development
Mbala	Gaston Sichilima	Movement for Multi-Party Democracy
Mfuwe	Nason Sambwa	Movement for Multi-Party Democracy
Milanzi	Rosemary Banda	United National Independence Party
Mkaika	Zawe Mwanza	Forum for Democracy and Development
Mkushi North	Webby Kamwendo	Movement for Multi-Party Democracy
Mkushi South	Abel Chambeshi	Movement for Multi-Party Democracy
Mongu Central	Francis Simenda	United Party for National Development
Monze	Jacob Mwiimbu	United Party for National Development
Moomba	Vitalis Mooya	United Party for National Development
Mpika Central	Mateyo Mwaba	Movement for Multi-Party Democracy
Mpongwe	Davison Mulela	Movement for Multi-Party Democracy
Mporokoso	Chiti Sampa	Movement for Multi-Party Democracy
Mpulungu	Harrigan Mazimba	Movement for Multi-Party Democracy
Msanzala	Levison Mumba	Movement for Multi-Party Democracy
Muchinga	Ackson Kalunga	Movement for Multi-Party Democracy
Mufulira	Kaunda Lembalemba	Movement for Multi-Party Democracy
Mufumbwe	Bert Mushala	Movement for Multi-Party Democracy
Mulobezi	Michael Mabenga	Movement for Multi-Party Democracy
Mumbwa	Yusuf Badat	United Party for National Development
Munali	Edith Nawakwi	Forum for Democracy and Development
Mwandi	Sipula Kabanje	United Party for National Development
Mwansabombwe	Songobele Mungo	Movement for Multi-Party Democracy
Mwembeshi	Edward Kasoko	United Party for National Development
Mwense	Norman Chibamba	Movement for Multi-Party Democracy
Mwinilunga East	James Katoka	United Party for National Development
Mwinilunga West	Richard Kapita	United Party for National Development
Nakonde	Clever Silavwe	Movement for Multi-Party Democracy
Nalikwanda	Simasiku Kalumiana	United Party for National Development
Nalolo	Inonge Wina	United Party for National Development
Namwala	Ompie Liebental	United Party for National Development
Nangoma	Kennedy Shepande	United Party for National Development
Nchanga	Richard Kazala-Laski	Movement for Multi-Party Democracy
Nchelenge	Rosemary Chipampe	Movement for Multi-Party Democracy
Ndola	Eric Silwamba	Movement for Multi-Party Democracy
Nkana	George Chulumanda	Movement for Multi-Party Democracy
Nyimba	Roy Gray	Forum for Democracy and Development
Pambashe	Alex Chama	Movement for Multi-Party Democracy
Pemba	David Matongo	United Party for National Development
Petauke	Ronald Banda	Heritage Party
Roan	Cameron Pwele	United National Independence Party
Rufunsa	Damian Kayaba	Forum for Democracy and Development
Senanga Central	Walusiku Situmbeko	United Party for National Development
Senga Hill	Kapembwa Simbao	Movement for Multi-Party Democracy
Serenje	Ackimson Banda	Movement for Multi-Party Democracy
Sesheke	Nakatindi Wina	United Party for National Development
Shiwa Ng'andu	Peter Filamba	Movement for Multi-Party Democracy
Siavonga	Douglas Syakalima	United Party for National Development
Sikongo	Best Makumba	United Party for National Development
Sinazongwe	Raphael Muyanda	United Party for National Development
Sinda	Levy Ngoma	Forum for Democracy and Development
Sinjembela	Pumulo Mubyana	United Party for National Development
Solwezi Central	Benny Tetamashimba	United Party for National Development
Solwezi East	Patrick Kangwa	United Party for National Development
Solwezi West	Logan Shemena	United Party for National Development
Vubwi	Phillip Phiri	United National Independence Party
Wusakile	Stephen Mukuka	Movement for Multi-Party Democracy
Zambezi East	Maxwell Mukwakwa	United Party for National Development
Zambezi West	Charles Kakoma	United Party for National Development

==== Replacements by by-election ====
Constituency	Original member	Party	By-election date	New member	Party
Bwacha	Gladys Nyirongo	Heritage Party	28 August 2002	Gladys Nyirongo	Movement for Multi-Party Democracy
Kabwe Central	Patrick Musonda	Heritage Party	28 August 2002	Patrick Musonda	Movement for Multi-Party Democracy
Kantanshi	Danny Kombe	Movement for Multi-Party Democracy	18 September 2003	Alex Manda	Patriotic Front
Kaoma Central	Austin Liato	United Party for National Development	18 September 2003	Austin Liato	Movement for Multi-Party Democracy
Solwezi Central	Benny Tetamashimba	United Party for National Development	18 September 2003	Benny Tetamashimba	Movement for Multi-Party Democracy
Lukulu East	Batuke Imenda	United Party for National Development	18 September 2003		
Msanzala	Levison Mumba	Movement for Multi-Party Democracy	14 October 2003	Peter Daka	Movement for Multi-Party Democracy
Mwinilunga East	James Katoka	United Party for National Development	18 November 2003	James Katoka	Movement for Multi-Party Democracy
Mulobezi	Michael Mabenga	Movement for Multi-Party Democracy	18 November 2003	Mwiya Wanyambe	Movement for Multi-Party Democracy
Mpika Central	Mateyo Mwaba	Movement for Multi-Party Democracy	18 November 2003	Bwalya Chiti	Movement for Multi-Party Democracy
Kantanshi	Alex Manda	Patriotic Front	26 May 2004	Yamfwa Mukanga	Patriotic Front

=== Non-elected members ===
Type	Member	Party
Speaker	Amusaa Mwanamwambwa	Independent
