= List of members of the National Assembly of Zambia (1988–1991) =

The members of the National Assembly of Zambia from 1988 until 1991 were elected on 26 October 1988. The country was a one-party state at the time, meaning the only party represented was the United National Independence Party. An additional ten members were nominated by President Kenneth Kaunda.

== List of members ==
=== Elected members ===
| Constituency | Member | Party |
|---|---|---|
| Bahati | Simon Kalaba | United National Independence Party |
| Bangweulu | Joseph Kasongo | United National Independence Party |
| Bwacha | Richard Banda | United National Independence Party |
| Bwana Mkubwa | Lawrence Phiri | United National Independence Party |
| Bweengwa | Eli Mwanang'onze | United National Independence Party |
| Chadiza | Shart Banda | United National Independence Party |
| Chama | Nephas Tembo | United National Independence Party |
| Chasefu | Stanley Phiri | United National Independence Party |
| Chembe | Dickson Mpundu | United National Independence Party |
| Chiengi | Tayaisius Koti | United National Independence Party |
| Chifubu | Arthur Mtewa | United National Independence Party |
| Chifunabuli | Anthony Ndalama | United National Independence Party |
| Chikankata | Machila Lumina | United National Independence Party |
| Chililabombwe | Mufo Nkunika | United National Independence Party |
| Chilubi | Rabbison Chongo | United National Independence Party |
| Chimwemwe | Julius Kabaso | United National Independence Party |
| Chingola | | United National Independence Party |
| Chinsali | Francis Kaunda | United National Independence Party |
| Chipangali | Gershom Nkhoma | United National Independence Party |
| Chipata | Teddy Mbewe | United National Independence Party |
| Chipili | Enock Mwewa | United National Independence Party |
| Chisamba | Godwin Chinkuli | United National Independence Party |
| Chitambo | Jeremiah Mukando | United National Independence Party |
| Chizela | Mulondwe Muzungu | United National Independence Party |
| Choma | Daniel Munkombwe | United National Independence Party |
| Chongwe | Elizabeth Mulenje | United National Independence Party |
| Dundumwenzi | Jonathan Sing'ombe | United National Independence Party |
| Feira | Stanislaus Nyamkandeka | United National Independence Party |
| Gwembe | Bernard Hanyimbo | United National Independence Party |
| Isoka East | Elwell Muwowo | United National Independence Party |
| Isoka West | Winstone Siame | United National Independence Party |
| Kabompo | Mathews Makayi | United National Independence Party |
| Kabushi | Levi Mbulo | United National Independence Party |
| Kabwata | Michael Sata | United National Independence Party |
| Kabwe | Wilfred Wonani | United National Independence Party |
| Kafue | Joel Shabusale | United National Independence Party |
| Kalabo | John Miyato | United National Independence Party |
| Kalomo | Redson Kumalo | United National Independence Party |
| Kalulushi | Bonard Sekwila | United National Independence Party |
| Kankoyo | Jack Kopolo | United National Independence Party |
| Kantanshi | David Nkhata | United National Independence Party |
| Kanyama | Donald Chilufya | United National Independence Party |
| Kaoma | Fred Chabaya | United National Independence Party |
| Kapoche | Ben Zulu | United National Independence Party |
| Kaputa | Wilson Chipili | United National Independence Party |
| Kasama | Daniel Kapapa | United National Independence Party |
| Kasempa | Kasempa Mushitala | United National Independence Party |
| Kasenengwa | John Ngoma | United National Independence Party |
| Katete North | Gibson Chigaga | United National Independence Party |
| Katete South | Joseph Mbewe | United National Independence Party |
| Katombora | Henry Siamani | United National Independence Party |
| Katuba | Mavis Muyunda | United National Independence Party |
| Kawambwa | Francis Kapansa | United National Independence Party |
| Kwacha | Austin Sichinga | United National Independence Party |
| Liuwa | Namushi Namuchana | United National Independence Party |
| Livingstone | Enos Haimbe | United National Independence Party |
| Luampa | Kenneth Musangu | United National Independence Party |
| Luangeni | Johnstone Jere | United National Independence Party |
| Luanshya | Leonard Mpundu | United National Independence Party |
| Luapula | Augustine Katotobwe | United National Independence Party |
| Lubansenshi | Eugine Mulenga | United National Independence Party |
| Luena | Chrispin Sibetta | United National Independence Party |
| Lukanga | Johnny Chafwa | United National Independence Party |
| Lukashya | Cosmas Masongo | United National Independence Party |
| Lukulu | Alexis Luhila | United National Independence Party |
| Lumezi | Leticia Mwanza | United National Independence Party |
| Lundazi | Dingiswago Banda | United National Independence Party |
| Lupososhi | Athanasio Kabaso | United National Independence Party |
| Luswishi | Peter Shibuchinga | United National Independence Party |
| Malambo | Wezi Kaunda | United National Independence Party |
| Malole | Godfrey Kasoma | United National Independence Party |
| Mandevu | Pencil Phiri | United National Independence Party |
| Mansa | Mwenaboyi Kaimbi | United National Independence Party |
| Masaiti | George Mpombo | United National Independence Party |
| Matero | Abel Mkandawire | United National Independence Party |
| Mazabuka | Ben Mwiinga | United National Independence Party |
| Mbabala | Maurice Katowa | United National Independence Party |
| Mbala | Lightwell Sibale | United National Independence Party |
| Mkushi North | Leonard Kombe | United National Independence Party |
| Mkushi South | Matilda Kolala | United National Independence Party |
| Mongu | Munukayumbwa Sipalo | United National Independence Party |
| Monze | Joseph Sichoonga | United National Independence Party |
| Moomba | Jeremiah Chijikwa | United National Independence Party |
| Mpika East | | United National Independence Party |
| Mpika West | Otema Musuka | United National Independence Party |
| Mporokoso | Kasonde Mwamba | United National Independence Party |
| Mpulungu | John Chizu | United National Independence Party |
| Msanzala | Achitenji Mumba | United National Independence Party |
| Mufulira | Mary Chisala | United National Independence Party |
| Mulobezi | Leonard Subulwa | United National Independence Party |
| Mumbwa East | Kennedy Shepande | United National Independence Party |
| Mumbwa West | Joel Chivwema | United National Independence Party |
| Munali | Rupiah Banda | United National Independence Party |
| Mwansabombwe | Peter Chanshi | United National Independence Party |
| Mwense | Felix Kapapula | United National Independence Party |
| Mwinilunga East | Saimon Nyamboji | United National Independence Party |
| Mwinilunga West | John Kalenga | United National Independence Party |
| Nakonde | Arnold Simuchimba | United National Independence Party |
| Nalikwanda | Namonda Kamayoyo | United National Independence Party |
| Nalolo | Njekwa Anamela | United National Independence Party |
| Namwala | Biggie Nkumbula | United National Independence Party |
| Nchanga | Titus Mukupa | United National Independence Party |
| Nchelenge | Mukanga Kainga | United National Independence Party |
| Ndola | Victor Konie | United National Independence Party |
| Nkana | Noel Mvula | United National Independence Party |
| Nyimba | Ronald Koloweka | United National Independence Party |
| Pemba | Aaron Chonya | United National Independence Party |
| Petauke | Lavu Mulimba | United National Independence Party |
| Roan | Moses Mwachindalo | United National Independence Party |
| Senanga | Likando Kalaluka | United National Independence Party |
| Senga Hill | Frederick Simpasa | United National Independence Party |
| Serenje | Musonda Chunga | United National Independence Party |
| Sesheke | Inyambo Yeta | United National Independence Party |
| Shiwa Ng'andu | Namutambili Muyoba | United National Independence Party |
| Siavonga | Frederick Hapunda | United National Independence Party |
| Sihole | Mubiana Kangongwe | United National Independence Party |
| Sikongo | Mbambo Sianga | United National Independence Party |
| Sinazongwe | Dodson Syatalimi | United National Independence Party |
| Sinjembela | Albert Limbo | United National Independence Party |
| Solwezi East | Humphrey Mulemba | United National Independence Party |
| Solwezi West | Beston Mukumbi | United National Independence Party |
| Wusakile | Maliya Chitumbi | United National Independence Party |
| Zambezi East | Joseph Poho | United National Independence Party |
| Zambezi North | Bernard Fumbelo | United National Independence Party |
| Zambezi West | Rodger Sakuhuka | United National Independence Party |

=== Non-elected members ===
| Type | Member | Party |
|---|---|---|
| Speaker | Fwanyanga Mulikita | |
| Nominated | Pickson Chitambala | |
| Nominated | Frederick Chomba | |
| Nominated | Lameck Goma | |
| Nominated | Malimba Masheke | |
| Nominated | Benjamin Mibenge | |
| Nominated | Alex Shapi | |
| Nominated | Lazarus Tembo | |
