= List of members of the National Assembly of Zambia (1983–1988) =

The members of the National Assembly of Zambia from 1983 until 1988 were elected on 27 October 1983. The country was a one-party state at the time, meaning the only party represented was the United National Independence Party. An additional ten members were nominated by President Kenneth Kaunda.

== List of members ==
=== Elected members ===
Constituency	Member	Party
Bahati	Simon Kalaba	United National Independence Party
Bangweulu	Joseph Kasongo	United National Independence Party
Bwacha	Richard Banda	United National Independence Party
Bwana Mkubwa	Cleaver Mukuka	United National Independence Party
Bweengwa	Rex Natala	United National Independence Party
Chadiza	Shart Banda	United National Independence Party
Chama	Richard Zimba	United National Independence Party
Chasefu	Raston Chirwa	United National Independence Party
Chembe	Ernest Chiwama	United National Independence Party
Chiengi	Maxwell Lufoma	United National Independence Party
Chifubu	Godfrey Simasiku	United National Independence Party
Chifunabuli	Clement Mwananshiku	United National Independence Party
Chikankata	Lazarus Cheelo	United National Independence Party
Chililabombwe	Palakasa Chiwaya	United National Independence Party
Chilubi	Rabbison Chongo	United National Independence Party
Chimwemwe	Julius Kabaso	United National Independence Party
Chingola	Denny Kapandula	United National Independence Party
Chinsali	Boniface Shinga	United National Independence Party
Chipangali	Sorry Banda	United National Independence Party
Chipata	Reuben Phiri	United National Independence Party
Chipili	Enock Mwena	United National Independence Party
Chisamba	Saul Chipwayambokoma	United National Independence Party
Chitambo	Jeremiah Mukando	United National Independence Party
Chizela	Mulondwe Muzungu	United National Independence Party
Choma	Daniel Munkombwe	United National Independence Party
Chongwe	Elizabeth Mulenje	United National Independence Party
Dundumwenzi	Jonathan Sing'ombe	United National Independence Party
Feira	Stanislaus Nyamkandeka	United National Independence Party
Gwembe	Bernard Hanyimbo	United National Independence Party
Isoka East	Elwell Muwowo	United National Independence Party
Isoka West	Blackson Sikanyika	United National Independence Party
Kabompo	Benjamin Chipango	United National Independence Party
Kabushi	Cosmas Chibanda	United National Independence Party
Kabwata	Michael Sata	United National Independence Party
Kabwe	Wilfred Wonani	United National Independence Party
Kafue	Francis Matanda	United National Independence Party
Kalabo	John Miyato	United National Independence Party
Kalomo	Nathan Siafwa	United National Independence Party
Kalulushi	Webster Lamba	United National Independence Party
Kankoyo	Jack Kopolo	United National Independence Party
Kantanshi	David Nkhata	United National Independence Party
Kanyama	Alfayo Hambayi	United National Independence Party
Kaoma	Jameson Kalaluka	United National Independence Party
Kapoche	Ben Zulu	United National Independence Party
Kaputa	Kingfred Katai	United National Independence Party
Kasama	Alfred Chilumba	United National Independence Party
Kasempa	Mark Tambatamba	United National Independence Party
Kasenengwa	Dane Zulu	United National Independence Party
Katete North	Gibson Chigaga	United National Independence Party
Katete South	Joseph Mbewe	United National Independence Party
Katombora	Kenny Musoktwane	United National Independence Party
Katuba	Mavis Muyunda	United National Independence Party
Kawambwa	Edwin Chansa	United National Independence Party
Kwacha	Basil Kabwe	United National Independence Party
Liuwa	Namushi Namuchana	United National Independence Party
Livingstone	Enos Haimbe	United National Independence Party
Luampa	Kenneth Musangu	United National Independence Party
Luangeni	William Kayamba	United National Independence Party
Luanshya	Raphael Chota	United National Independence Party
Luapula	Fabian Kaya	United National Independence Party
Lubansenshi	Albert Mukuka	United National Independence Party
Luena	Davison Muttendango	United National Independence Party
Lukanga	Johnny Chafwa	United National Independence Party
Lukashya	Cosmas Masongo	United National Independence Party
Lukulu	Alexis Mwanangombe	United National Independence Party
Lumezi	Mjose Mwale	United National Independence Party
Lundazi	James Nyirongo	United National Independence Party
Lupososhi	Athanasio Kabaso	United National Independence Party
Luswishi	Peter Shibuchinga	United National Independence Party
Malambo	Morris Chulu	United National Independence Party
Malole	Remie Chikonkolo	United National Independence Party
Mandevu	Ebrushy Phiri	United National Independence Party
Mansa	Edward Chinungu	United National Independence Party
Masaiti	Dawson Lupunga	United National Independence Party
Matero	Felix Chanda	United National Independence Party
Mazabuka	Patterson Haamane	United National Independence Party
Mbabala	Maurice Katowa	United National Independence Party
Mbala	Ablam Chitala	United National Independence Party
Mkushi North	Leonard Kombe	United National Independence Party
Mkushi South	Matildah Kolala	United National Independence Party
Mongu	Munukayumbwa Sipalo	United National Independence Party
Monze	Job Michello	United National Independence Party
Moomba	Fitzpatrick Chuula	United National Independence Party
Mpika East	Fredrick Chomba	United National Independence Party
Mpika West	Otema Musuka	United National Independence Party
Mporokoso	Unia Mwila	United National Independence Party
Mpulungu	John Chizu	United National Independence Party
Msanzala	Clemens Mwanza	United National Independence Party
Mufulira	Edgar Godfrey	United National Independence Party
Mulobezi	Leonard Subulwa	United National Independence Party
Mumbwa East	Kennedy Shepande	United National Independence Party
Mumbwa West	Joel Chivwema	United National Independence Party
Munali	Simeon Kampata	United National Independence Party
Mwansabombwe	Peter Chanshi	United National Independence Party
Mwense	Simon Kachasa	United National Independence Party
Mwinilunga East	Ben Kakoma	United National Independence Party
Mwinilunga West	John Kalenga	United National Independence Party
Nakonde	Arnold Simuchimba	United National Independence Party
Nalikwanda	Mufaya Mumbuna	United National Independence Party
Nalolo	Amos Linyama	United National Independence Party
Namwala	Biggie Nkumbula	United National Independence Party
Nchanga	Titus Mukupa	United National Independence Party
Nchelenge	James Mubanga	United National Independence Party
Ndola	Esther Chande	United National Independence Party
Nkana	Wisdom Mvule	United National Independence Party
Nyimba	Zilole Mumba	United National Independence Party
Pemba	Landson Hantuba	United National Independence Party
Petauke	Lavu Mulimba	United National Independence Party
Roan	Leonard Mpundu	United National Independence Party
Senanga	Likando Kalaluka	United National Independence Party
Senga Hill	Hynkson Bowa	United National Independence Party
Serenje	Rajah Kunda	United National Independence Party
Sesheke	Lawrence Sinyani	United National Independence Party
Shiwa Ng'andu	Ignatius Ngosa	United National Independence Party
Siavonga	Fredrick Hapunda	United National Independence Party
Sihole	Kaluwe Mukena	United National Independence Party
Sikongo	Mbambo Sianga	United National Independence Party
Sinazongwe	Dodson Syatalimi	United National Independence Party
Sinjembela	Albert Limbo	United National Independence Party
Solwezi East	Ludwig Sondashi	United National Independence Party
Solwezi West	Beston Mukumbi	United National Independence Party
Wusakile	Dennis Katilungu	United National Independence Party
Zambezi East	Noah Dilamonu	United National Independence Party
Zambezi North	John Mwondela	United National Independence Party
Zambezi West	Rodger Sakuhuka	United National Independence Party

==== Replacements by by-election ====
Constituency	Original member	Party	By-election date	New member	Party
Nalolo	Amos Linyama	United National Independence Party	1984	Njekwa Anamela	United National Independence Party
Roan	Leonard Mpundu	United National Independence Party	1984	Moses Mwachindalo	United National Independence Party
Chasefu	Raston Chirwa	United National Independence Party	1985	Charles Nyirenda	United National Independence Party
Luapula	Fabian Kaya	United National Independence Party	1985	Augustine Katotobwe	United National Independence Party
Lubansenshi	Albert Mukuka	United National Independence Party		Albert Chibulamano	United National Independence Party
Kafue	Francis Matanda	United National Independence Party	1986	Chanda Sosala	United National Independence Party
Luanshya	Raphael Chota	United National Independence Party	1986	Dickson Kaliyangile	United National Independence Party
Mpika East	Fredrick Chomba	United National Independence Party	1986	Francis Mumbi	United National Independence Party
Chingola	Denny Kapandula	United National Independence Party	January 1987	Enoch Kavindele	United National Independence Party
			1987	Francis Kapansa	United National Independence Party

=== Non-elected members ===
Type	Member	Party
Speaker	Robinson Nabulyato	
Nominated	Fabiano Chela	
Nominated	Godwin Chinkuli	
Nominated	Lameck Goma	
Nominated	Joseph Litana	
Nominated	Henry Meebelo	
Nominated	Elijah Mudenda	
Nominated	Nalumino Mundia	
Nominated	Haswell Mwale	
Nominated	Luke Mwananshiku	
Nominated	Alexander Grey Zulu	

==== Replacements ====
Original member	Date	Replacement	Notes
	1984	Samson Mukando	Nominated
		Pickson Chitambala	Nominated
		Malimba Masheke	Nominated
		Alex Shapi	Nominated
	1986	Joseph Punabantu	Nominated
	1986	Kapembe Nsingo	Nominated
	1987	Frederick Chomba	Nominated
	1987	Paul Malukutila	Nominated
