= List of members of the National Assembly of Zambia (1996–2001) =

The members of the National Assembly of Zambia from 1996 until 2001 were elected on 18 November 1996. Of the 150 elected members, 131 were from the Movement for Multi-Party Democracy, five from the National Party, two from Agenda for Zambia and the Zambia Democratic Congress, together with ten independents.

== List of members ==
=== Elected members ===
Constituency	Member	Party
Bahati	Valentine Kayope	Movement for Multi-Party Democracy
Bangweulu	Daniel Pule	Movement for Multi-Party Democracy
Bwacha	John Chisanga	Movement for Multi-Party Democracy
Bwana Mkubwa	Mathew Mulanda	Movement for Multi-Party Democracy
Bweengwa	Edgar Keembe	Movement for Multi-Party Democracy
Chadiza	Regina Phiri	Movement for Multi-Party Democracy
Chama North	John Phiri	Movement for Multi-Party Democracy
Chama South	Yotam Ngulube	Movement for Multi-Party Democracy
Chasefu	Dorothy Tembo	Movement for Multi-Party Democracy
Chavuma	Jerry Muloji	Movement for Multi-Party Democracy
Chawama	Christon Tembo	Movement for Multi-Party Democracy
Chembe	Mumba Sokontwe	Movement for Multi-Party Democracy
Chiengi	Katele Kalumba	Movement for Multi-Party Democracy
Chifubu	David Mulenga	Movement for Multi-Party Democracy
Chifunabuli	Ernest Mwansa	Movement for Multi-Party Democracy
Chikankata	Misheck Chiinda	Movement for Multi-Party Democracy
Chilanga	Mann Muyuni	Movement for Multi-Party Democracy
Chililabombwe	Sikota Wina	Movement for Multi-Party Democracy
Chilubi	Shisala Mponda	Movement for Multi-Party Democracy
Chimbamilonga	Samuel Mukupa	Movement for Multi-Party Democracy
Chimwemwe	Charles Museba	Movement for Multi-Party Democracy
Chingola	Enoch Kavindele	Movement for Multi-Party Democracy
Chinsali	David Kapangalwendo	Movement for Multi-Party Democracy
Chipangali	Grandson Ngoma	Movement for Multi-Party Democracy
Chipata	Rosemary Malama	Movement for Multi-Party Democracy
Chipili	Ntondo Chindoloma	Movement for Multi-Party Democracy
Chisamba	Cecil Holmes	Movement for Multi-Party Democracy
Chitambo	Donald Ngosa	Movement for Multi-Party Democracy
Choma	Syamukayumbu Syamujaye	Movement for Multi-Party Democracy
Chongwe	Gibson Nkausu	Movement for Multi-Party Democracy
Dundumwenzi	Muchindu Chibambula	Movement for Multi-Party Democracy
Feira	Fidelis Mando	Movement for Multi-Party Democracy
Gwembe	Clement Chiimbwe	Movement for Multi-Party Democracy
Isoka East	Robert Sichinga	Independent
Isoka West	Blackwood Sikombe	Independent
Itezhi-Tezhi	Luminzu Shimaponda	Movement for Multi-Party Democracy
Kabompo East	Anosh Chipawa	Movement for Multi-Party Democracy
Kabompo West	Daniel Kalenga	Independent
Kabushi	Peter Chintala	Movement for Multi-Party Democracy
Kabwata	Godfrey Miyanda	Movement for Multi-Party Democracy
Kabwe	Austin Chewe	Independent
Kafue	Akbar Badat	Movement for Multi-Party Democracy
Kafulafuta	Dickson Matutu	Movement for Multi-Party Democracy
Kalabo	Godfrey Simasiku	Movement for Multi-Party Democracy
Kalomo	Mpundu Miyanda	Movement for Multi-Party Democracy
Kalulushi	Elizabeth Chipampata	Movement for Multi-Party Democracy
Kamfinsa	Webster Chipili	Movement for Multi-Party Democracy
Kanchibiya	Newton Ng'uni	Movement for Multi-Party Democracy
Kankoyo	Irene Chisala	Movement for Multi-Party Democracy
Kantanshi	Steven Chilombo	Movement for Multi-Party Democracy
Kanyama	Nakatindi Wina	Movement for Multi-Party Democracy
Kaoma	Handson Nyundu	Movement for Multi-Party Democracy
Kapiri Mposhi	Macdonald Nkabika	Independent
Kapoche	Alfred Chioza	Movement for Multi-Party Democracy
Kaputa	Paul Bupe	Movement for Multi-Party Democracy
Kasama	Simon Mwila	Movement for Multi-Party Democracy
Kasempa	John Muasa	National Party
Kasenengwa	Adam Machher	Movement for Multi-Party Democracy
Katombola	Musokotwane Nondo	Movement for Multi-Party Democracy
Katuba	Gilbert Mululu	Movement for Multi-Party Democracy
Kawambwa	Elizabeth Mutale	Movement for Multi-Party Democracy
Keembe	Jeston Mulando	Movement for Multi-Party Democracy
Kwacha	Newstead Zimba	Movement for Multi-Party Democracy
Liuwa	Amusaa Mwanamwambwa	Movement for Multi-Party Democracy
Livingstone	Munang'angu Hatembo	Movement for Multi-Party Democracy
Luampa	Stephen Manjata	Movement for Multi-Party Democracy
Luangeni	Solomon Mbuzi	Movement for Multi-Party Democracy
Luanshya	Benjamin Mwila	Movement for Multi-Party Democracy
Luapula	Peter Machungwa	Movement for Multi-Party Democracy
Lubansenshi	Joackim Mwape	Movement for Multi-Party Democracy
Luena	Uyi Sibetta	Independent
Lufwanyama	Mike Mulongoti	Movement for Multi-Party Democracy
Lukashya	Bernard Mpundu	Movement for Multi-Party Democracy
Lukulu East	Cadman Luhila	Independent
Lukulu West	Simasiku Namakando	Movement for Multi-Party Democracy
Lumezi	Francis Kamanga	Movement for Multi-Party Democracy
Lundazi	Chrisford Ngulube	Movement for Multi-Party Democracy
Lunte	Dominic Musonda	Movement for Multi-Party Democracy
Lupososhi	Elpidius Mweni	Movement for Multi-Party Democracy
Lusaka Central	Dipak Patel	Independent
Magoye	Vincent Malambo	Movement for Multi-Party Democracy
Malambo	Bertram Mmembe	Movement for Multi-Party Democracy
Malole	Dismas Kalingeme	Movement for Multi-Party Democracy
Mambilima	Patrick Kalifungwa	Movement for Multi-Party Democracy
Mandevu	Nkandu Luo	Movement for Multi-Party Democracy
Mangango	Chrispin Shumina	Movement for Multi-Party Democracy
Mansa	Kelvin Mwitwa	Movement for Multi-Party Democracy
Mapatizya	Ackson Sejani	Movement for Multi-Party Democracy
Masaiti	Jazzman Chikwakwa	Movement for Multi-Party Democracy
Matero	Samuel Miyanda	Movement for Multi-Party Democracy
Mazabuka	Benny Mwiinga	Movement for Multi-Party Democracy
Mbabala	Alfayo Hambayi	Movement for Multi-Party Democracy
Mbala	Ronald Penza	Movement for Multi-Party Democracy
Mfuwe	Charity Mwansa	Independent
Milanzi	Trywell Phiri	Movement for Multi-Party Democracy
Mkaika	Cikakula Banda	Movement for Multi-Party Democracy
Mkushi North	Jack Chipindi	Movement for Multi-Party Democracy
Mkushi South	Abel Chambeshi	Movement for Multi-Party Democracy
Mongu	Akashambatwa Mbikusita-Lewanika	Agenda for Zambia
Monze	Suresh Desai	Movement for Multi-Party Democracy
Moomba	Hachimvwa Moonga	Movement for Multi-Party Democracy
Mpika	Michael Sata	Movement for Multi-Party Democracy
Mpongwe	Dawson Lupunga	Movement for Multi-Party Democracy
Mporokoso	Ackim Nkole	Movement for Multi-Party Democracy
Mpulungu	Griver Sikasote	Movement for Multi-Party Democracy
Msanzala	Levison Mumba	Movement for Multi-Party Democracy
Muchinga	Pierre Chisenga	Movement for Multi-Party Democracy
Mufulira	Kaunda Lembelemba	Movement for Multi-Party Democracy
Mufumbwe	Bert Mushala	Independent
Mulobezi	Michael Mabenga	Movement for Multi-Party Democracy
Mumbwa	Donald Chivubwe	Movement for Multi-Party Democracy
Munali	Sonny Mulenga	Movement for Multi-Party Democracy
Mwandi	Monde Nangumbi	Movement for Multi-Party Democracy
Mwansabombwe	Josiah Chishala	Movement for Multi-Party Democracy
Mwembeshi	Yonnah Shimonde	Movement for Multi-Party Democracy
Mwense	Norman Chibamba	Movement for Multi-Party Democracy
Mwinilunga East	David Kambilumbilu	Movement for Multi-Party Democracy
Mwinilunga West	Elizabeth Kalenga	Movement for Multi-Party Democracy
Nakonde	Edith Nawakwi	Movement for Multi-Party Democracy
Nalikwanda	Walusiku Situmbeko	Zambia Democratic Congress
Nalolo	Kasukwa Mutukwa	Zambia Democratic Congress
Namwala	Jane Chikwata	Movement for Multi-Party Democracy
Nangoma	Shimaili David Mpamba	Movement for Multi-Party Democracy
Nchanga	Ladislas Kamata	Movement for Multi-Party Democracy
Nchelenge	Ndashi Chitalu	Movement for Multi-Party Democracy
Ndola	Eric Silwamba	Movement for Multi-Party Democracy
Nkana	Robbie Kasuba	Movement for Multi-Party Democracy
Nyimba	Chembe Nyangu	Movement for Multi-Party Democracy
Pambashe	Alex Chama	Movement for Multi-Party Democracy
Pemba	Aaron Muyovwe	Movement for Multi-Party Democracy
Petauke	Potiphar Mwanza	Movement for Multi-Party Democracy
Roan	Vernon Mwaanga	Movement for Multi-Party Democracy
Rufunsa	Samuel Chipungu	National Party
Senanga	William Harrington	Movement for Multi-Party Democracy
Senga Hill	Mathias Mpande	Movement for Multi-Party Democracy
Serenje	Abdul Hamir	Movement for Multi-Party Democracy
Sesheke	Mwiya Nawa	Agenda for Zambia
Shiwa Ng'andu	Celestino Chibamba	Movement for Multi-Party Democracy
Siavonga	Shumba Hapunda	Movement for Multi-Party Democracy
Sikongo	Nalumino Liandu	Movement for Multi-Party Democracy
Sinazongwe	Syacheye Madyenkuku	Movement for Multi-Party Democracy
Sinda	Ephraim Kamwinga	Movement for Multi-Party Democracy
Sinjembela	Sipakeli Walubita	Movement for Multi-Party Democracy
Solwezi Central	Ludwig Sondashi	National Party
Solwezi East	Patrick Kangwa	National Party
Solwezi West	Benny Tetamashimba	National Party
Vubwi	Alexander Miti	Movement for Multi-Party Democracy
Wusakile	Chitalu Sampa	Movement for Multi-Party Democracy
Zambezi East	Paul Kapina	Movement for Multi-Party Democracy
Zambezi West	David Saviye	Movement for Multi-Party Democracy

==== Replacements by by-elections ====
Constituency	Original member	Party	By-election date	New member	Party
Kabwata	Godfrey Miyanda	Movement for Multi-Party Democracy	6 September 2001	Richard Kachingwe	Forum for Democracy and Development

=== Non-elected members ===
Type	Member	Party
Speaker	Robinson Nabulyato	Independent

==== Replacements ====
Type	Previous member	Party	Date	New member	Party
Speaker	Robinson Nabulyato	Independent	1998	Amusaa Mwanamwambwa	Independent
