= List of ministers of Zambian provinces =

This is a list of provincial ministers of Zambia as of September 2021. All are members of the United Party for National Development. All ministers are elected members of Parliament except one who is a nominated minister by the President of the Republic of Zambia.

== List ==
Minister	Constituency (or nominated)	Province
Derricky Chilundika	Nchanga	Luapula Province
Robert Lihefu	Manyinga	North-Western Province
Elisha Matambo	Nominated	Copperbelt Province
Kapelwa Mbangweta	Nkeyema	Western Province
Leonard Mbao	Mpulungu	Northern Province
Sheal Mulyata	Rufunsa	Lusaka Province
Cornelius Mweetwa	Choma Central	Southern Province
Credo Nanjuwa	Mumbwa	Central Province
Peter Phiri	Malambo	Eastern Province
Henry Sikazwe	Senga Hill	Muchinga Province
