= List of members of the National Assembly of Zambia (1973–1978) =

The members of the National Assembly of Zambia from 1973 until 1978 were elected on 5 December 1973. The country was a one-party state at the time, meaning the only party represented was the United National Independence Party. An additional ten members were nominated by President Kenneth Kaunda.

== List of members ==
=== Elected members ===
Constituency	Member	Party
Bahati	Valentine Kayope	United National Independence Party
Bwacha	Richard Banda	United National Independence Party
Chadiza	Zongani Banda	United National Independence Party
Chama	Nephas Tembo	United National Independence Party
Chasefu	Haswell Mwale	United National Independence Party
Chembe	Sylvester Chisembele	United National Independence Party
Chiengi	Samson Mununga	United National Independence Party
Chifubu	Credo Banda	United National Independence Party
Chikankata	Joshua Lumina	United National Independence Party
Chilanga	Elizabeth Mulenje	United National Independence Party
Chililabombwe	Nephas Mulenga	United National Independence Party
Chilubi	Remi Chisupa	United National Independence Party
Chimwemwe	James Banda	United National Independence Party
Chingola	Aaron Milner	United National Independence Party
Chinsali	Boniface Shinga	United National Independence Party
Chipangali	Gideon Luhana	United National Independence Party
Chipata	Josiah Lungu	United National Independence Party
Chipili	David Makumbi	United National Independence Party
Chisamba	Richard Kasanda	United National Independence Party
Chitambo	Justin Mukando	United National Independence Party
Chiwala	Mwenyeamanzi Banda	United National Independence Party
Choma	Daniel Munkombwe	United National Independence Party
Dundumwenzi	Abel Munampamba	United National Independence Party
Feira	Felix Luputa	United National Independence Party
Gwembe	Bernard Haanyimbo	United National Independence Party
Isoka	Wilfred Siame	United National Independence Party
Kabombo	Moses Chinyeka	United National Independence Party
Kabwata	Mary Mwango	United National Independence Party
Kabwe	Miziyabo Mkandawire	United National Independence Party
Kafue	Francis Matanda	United National Independence Party
Kalabo	Maimbolwa Sakubita	United National Independence Party
Kalengwa	Victor Kanyungulu	United National Independence Party
Kalomo	Nathan Siafwa	United National Independence Party
Kalulushi	Alexander Chikwanda	United National Independence Party
Kankoyo	Joshua Mumpanshya	United National Independence Party
Kantanshi	Greenwood Silwizya	United National Independence Party
Kanyama	Fleefort Chirwa	United National Independence Party
Kaoma	Jameson Kalaluka	United National Independence Party
Kapoche	Josiah Kanyuka	United National Independence Party
Kaputa	Wilson Chipili	United National Independence Party
Kasama	Frederick Walinkonde	United National Independence Party
Kasempa	Mark Tambatamba	United National Independence Party
Katete	Amock Phiri	United National Independence Party
Katombora	Kebby Musokotwane	United National Independence Party
Katuba	Godfrey Laima	United National Independence Party
Kawambwa	Protasio Mwela	United National Independence Party
Kazimule	Zeniah Ndhlovu	United National Independence Party
Keembe	Willard Ntalasha	United National Independence Party
Kwacha	Laban Lubamba	United National Independence Party
Liuwa	Simon Ngombo	United National Independence Party
Livingstone	Arthur Wina	United National Independence Party
Luampa	Mowat Kapata	United National Independence Party
Luangeni	Shart Banda	United National Independence Party
Luanshya	Raphael Chota	United National Independence Party
Luena	Mufaya Mumbuna	United National Independence Party
Lukanga	Johny Chafwa	United National Independence Party
Lukashya	Joel Kapilikisha	United National Independence Party
Lukulu	Slyvester Katota	United National Independence Party
Lumezi	James Nyirongo	United National Independence Party
Lundazi	Axon Soko	United National Independence Party
Luwingu East	Albert Chibulamano	United National Independence Party
Luwingu West	Unia Mwila	United National Independence Party
Luswishi	Paul Lubunga	United National Independence Party
Magoye	Judah Haciwa	United National Independence Party
Malambo	Whitson Banda	United National Independence Party
Malole	Abel Mulanshoka	United National Independence Party
Mandevu	Dingiswayo Banda	United National Independence Party
Masaiti	Emmanuel Chimbamanaga	United National Independence Party
Mansa	Stalin Kaushi	United National Independence Party
Masala	Cosmas Chibanda	United National Independence Party
Matero	Lombe Chibesakunda	United National Independence Party
Mazabuka	Franklin Malawo	United National Independence Party
Mbabala	Edward Nyanga	United National Independence Party
Mbala	Edward Chitupi	United National Independence Party
Minga	Sebastian Zulu	United National Independence Party
Mkushi Boma	Joseph Katampi	United National Independence Party
Mongu	Fwanyanga Mulikita	United National Independence Party
Monze	Bennie Hamwemba	United National Independence Party
Monze West	Harry Nkumbula	United National Independence Party
Mpika East	Phillip Mwango	United National Independence Party
Mpika West	Otema Musuka	United National Independence Party
Mporokoso	Wila Mung'omba	United National Independence Party
Mpulungu	John Mwanakatwe	United National Independence Party
Mufulira	Joseph Mutale	United National Independence Party
Mulobezi	Fine Liboma	United National Independence Party
Mumbwa	Allan Chilimboyi	United National Independence Party
Munali	Mainza Chona	United National Independence Party
Muyombe	Sully Mugala	United National Independence Party
Mwansabombwe	Peter Chanshi	United National Independence Party
Mwense	Henry Matipa	United National Independence Party
Mwinilunga East	Rhodes Mangangu	United National Independence Party
Mwinilunga West	Peter Matoka	United National Independence Party
Nakonde	Arnold Simuchimba	United National Independence Party
Nalikwanda	Nawa Ikachana	United National Independence Party
Nalolo	Mutumba Bull	United National Independence Party
Namwala	Joseph Mwebma	United National Independence Party
Nchanga	Cosmas Masongo	United National Independence Party
Nchelenge	Kamga Mukanga	United National Independence Party
Ndola	Misheck Banda	United National Independence Party
Nkana	David Mwila	United National Independence Party
Nyimba	Sylvester Tembo	United National Independence Party
Old Mkushi	Francis Chembe	United National Independence Party
Pemba	Peter Muunga	United National Independence Party
Petauke	Fanuel Chiwawa	United National Independence Party
Roan	Simfukwe Mulwanda	United National Independence Party
Samfya Central	Scott Matafwali	United National Independence Party
Samfya North	Clement Mwananshiku	United National Independence Party
Samfya South	Fabian Kaya	United National Independence Party
Senanga	Willie Harrington	United National Independence Party
Senga Hill	Monica Chintu	United National Independence Party
Serenje	Rajah Kunda	United National Independence Party
Sesheke	Josphat Siyomunji	United National Independence Party
Shiwa Ng'andu	Grace Mulule	United National Independence Party
Siavonga	Cyrus Moonga	United National Independence Party
Sihole	Bernard Nakonde	United National Independence Party
Sikongo	Maboshe Silumesii	United National Independence Party
Sinazongwe	Maxwell Beyani	United National Independence Party
Sinjembela	Albert Limbo	United National Independence Party
Solwezi East	Tito Kibolya	United National Independence Party
Solwezi West	Timothy Kankasa	United National Independence Party
Vulamkoko	Sebastian Kawinga	United National Independence Party
Wusakile	Steven Malama	United National Independence Party
Zambezi East	William Nkanza	United National Independence Party
Zambezi North	Willie Mwondela	United National Independence Party
Zambezi West	Rodger Sakuhuka	United National Independence Party

==== Replacements by by-election ====
Constituency	Original member	Party	By-election date	New member	Party
Kalabo	Maimbolwa Sakubita	United National Independence Party		Nalumino Mundia	United National Independence Party
Senanga	Willie Harrington	United National Independence Party		Livinius Mukwe	United National Independence Party
Roan	Simfukwe Mulwanda	United National Independence Party	1977	Musonda Chambeshi	United National Independence Party

=== Non-elected members ===
Type	Member	Party
Speaker	Robinson Nabulyato	
Nominated	Axson Chalikulima	
Nominated	Fabiano Chela	
Nominated	Godwin Chinkuli	
Nominated	Basil Kabwe	
Nominated	Elias Kashita	
Nominated	Paul J. F. Lusaka	
Nominated	Lily Monze	
Nominated	Vernon Mwaanga	
Nominated	Matiya Ngalande	
Nominated	Annel Silungwe	

Original member	Date	Replacement	Notes
		Daniel Lisulo	Nominated
		Wilted Phiri	Nominated
		Lameck Goma	Nominated
		James Mapoma	Nominated
		Siteke Mwale	Nominated
		Peter Zuze	Nominated
	1978	Fredrick Chomba	Nominated
