= List of members of the National Assembly of Zambia (1978–1983) =

The members of the National Assembly of Zambia from 1978 until 1983 were elected on 12 December 1978. The country was a one-party state at the time, meaning the only party represented was the United National Independence Party. An additional ten members were nominated by President Kenneth Kaunda.

== List of members ==
=== Elected members ===
Constituency	Member	Party
Bahati	Simon Kalaba	United National Independence Party
Bwacha	Richard Banda	United National Independence Party
Bweengwa	Rex Natala	United National Independence Party
Chadiza	Gassian Phiri	United National Independence Party
Chama	Nephas Tembo	United National Independence Party
Chasefu	Sandress Zimba	United National Independence Party
Chembe	Sylvester Chisembele	United National Independence Party
Chiengi	Maxwell Lufoma	United National Independence Party
Chifubu	Newstead Zimba	United National Independence Party
Chikankata	Machila Lumina	United National Independence Party
Chilanga	Elizabeth Mulenje	United National Independence Party
Chililabombwe	Palakasa Chiwaya	United National Independence Party
Chilubi	Remi Chisupa	United National Independence Party
Chimwemwe	Thomas Chiseng'antambu	United National Independence Party
Chingola	Denny Kapandula	United National Independence Party
Chinsali	Yonamu Mpuku	United National Independence Party
Chipangali	Charles Tembo	United National Independence Party
Chipata	Chiwala Banda	United National Independence Party
Chipili	Whynter Chabala	United National Independence Party
Chisamba	Saul Chipwayambokoma	United National Independence Party
Chitambo	Jeremiah Mukando	United National Independence Party
Chiwala	Eno Banda	United National Independence Party
Choma	Daniel Munkombwe	United National Independence Party
Dundumwenzi	Abel Munampamba	United National Independence Party
Feira	Stanislaus Nyamkandeka	United National Independence Party
Gwembe	Bernard Hanyimbo	United National Independence Party
Isoka	Leonard Singoyi	United National Independence Party
Kabompo	Benjamin Chipango	United National Independence Party
Kabwata	Maxwell Sibongo	United National Independence Party
Kabwe	Alice Lloyd	United National Independence Party
Kafue	Bathsheba Ng'andu	United National Independence Party
Kalabo	Lioko Mbaimbai	United National Independence Party
Kalengwa	Mathews Makayi	United National Independence Party
Kalomo	Nathan Siafwa	United National Independence Party
Kalulushi	Webster Lamba	United National Independence Party
Kankoyo	Jack Kopolo	United National Independence Party
Kantanshi	MacDonald Mtine	United National Independence Party
Kanyama	Fleefort Chirwa	United National Independence Party
Kaoma	Jameson Kalaluka	United National Independence Party
Kapoche	Ben Zulu	United National Independence Party
Kaputa	Wilson Chipili	United National Independence Party
Kasama	Fredrick Walinkonde	United National Independence Party
Kasempa	Mark Tambatamba	United National Independence Party
Katete	Joseph Mbewe	United National Independence Party
Katombora	Kebby Musokotwane	United National Independence Party
Katuba	Mavis Muyunda	United National Independence Party
Kawambwa	Titus Mukupo	United National Independence Party
Kazimule	Zeniah Ndhlovu	United National Independence Party
Keembe	Robin Mwanza	United National Independence Party
Kwacha	Basil Kabwe	United National Independence Party
Liuwa	Namushi Namuchana	United National Independence Party
Livingstone	Sebastian Kapalu	United National Independence Party
Luampa	Kakoma Musangu	United National Independence Party
Luangeni	Shart Banda	United National Independence Party
Luanshya	Raphael Chota	United National Independence Party
Luena Flats	Mufaya Mumbuna	United National Independence Party
Lukanga	Johnny Chafwa	United National Independence Party
Lukashya	Fabiano Kalimaposo	United National Independence Party
Lukulu	Alexis Mwanagombe	United National Independence Party
Lumezi	Haswell Mwale	United National Independence Party
Lundazi	James Nyirongo	United National Independence Party
Luwingu East	Webster Chipalo	United National Independence Party
Luwingu West	John Chalwe	United National Independence Party
Luswishi	Paul Lubunga	United National Independence Party
Magoye	Fitzpatrick Chuula	United National Independence Party
Malambo	Whitson Banda	United National Independence Party
Malole	Lawrence Pikiti	United National Independence Party
Mandevu	Dingiswayo Banda	United National Independence Party
Mansa	Wilson Chakulya	United National Independence Party
Masala	Cosmas Chibanda	United National Independence Party
Masaiti	Dawson Lupunga	United National Independence Party
Matero	Francis Nkhoma	United National Independence Party
Mazabuka	Simon Maambo	United National Independence Party
Mbabala	Edward Nyanga	United National Independence Party
Mbala	Ablam Chitala	United National Independence Party
Minga	Shadreck Chembe	United National Independence Party
Mkushi Boma	Leonard Kombe	United National Independence Party
Mongu	Daniel Lisulo	United National Independence Party
Monze	Paul Hamanenga	United National Independence Party
Mpika East	Fredrick Chomba	United National Independence Party
Mpika West	Otema Musuka	United National Independence Party
Mporokoso	Unia Mwila	United National Independence Party
Mpulungu	Wind Mazimba	United National Independence Party
Mufulira	David Lunda	United National Independence Party
Mulobezi	Leonard Subulwa	United National Independence Party
Mumbwa	Allan Chilimboyi	United National Independence Party
Munali	Rupiah Banda	United National Independence Party
Muyombe	Elwell Muwowo	United National Independence Party
Mwansabombwe	Edward Muonga	United National Independence Party
Mwense	Felix Kapapula	United National Independence Party
Mwinilunga East	Ben Kakoma	United National Independence Party
Mwinilunga West	John Kalenga	United National Independence Party
Nakonde	Arnold Simuchimba	United National Independence Party
Nalikwanda	Nawa Ikacana	United National Independence Party
Nalolo	Mutumba Bull	United National Independence Party
Namwala	Dennis Zaloumis	United National Independence Party
Nchanga	Cosmas Masongo	United National Independence Party
Nchelenge	Mukanga Kainga	United National Independence Party
Ndola	Roy Chaiwa	United National Independence Party
Nkana	Augustine Nkumbula	United National Independence Party
Nyimba	Aston Phiri	United National Independence Party
Old Mkushi	Francis Chembe	United National Independence Party
Pemba	Landson Hantuba	United National Independence Party
Petauke	Fanwell Chiwawa	United National Independence Party
Roan	Saindani Phiri	United National Independence Party
Samfya Central	Joseph Kasongo	United National Independence Party
Samfya North	Clement Mwananshiku	United National Independence Party
Samfya South	Fabian Kaya	United National Independence Party
Senanga	Linyando Mukwe	United National Independence Party
Senga Hill	Telesphore Nsokolo	United National Independence Party
Serenje	Rajah Kunda	United National Independence Party
Sesheke	Yusiku Mukelabai	United National Independence Party
Shiwa Ng'andu	Ignatius Ngosa	United National Independence Party
Siavonga	Fredrick Hapunda	United National Independence Party
Sihole	Bernard Nakonde	United National Independence Party
Sikongo	Mbambo Sianga	United National Independence Party
Sinazongwe	Maxwell Beyani	United National Independence Party
Sinjembela	Albert Limbo	United National Independence Party
Solwezi East	Ludwig Sondashi	United National Independence Party
Solwezi West	Beston Mukumbi	United National Independence Party
Vulamkoko	Gibson Chigaga	United National Independence Party
Wusakile	Dennis Katilungu	United National Independence Party
Zambezi East	Noah Dilamonu	United National Independence Party
Zambezi North	John Mwondela	United National Independence Party
Zambezi West	Rodger Sakuhuka	United National Independence Party

==== Replacements by by-election ====
Constituency	Original member	Party	By-election date	New member	Party
Chingola	Denny Kapandula	United National Independence Party	1979	Denny Kapandula	United National Independence Party
Petauke	Fanwell Chiwawa	United National Independence Party	1979	Lavu Mulimba	United National Independence Party

=== Non-elected members ===
Type	Member	Party
Speaker	Robinson Nabulyato	
Nominated	Alexander Chikwanda	
Nominated	Kingsley Chinkuli	
Nominated	Lameck Goma	
Nominated	Elijah Mudenda	
Nominated	Humphrey Mulemba	
Nominated	Nalumino Mundia	
Nominated	Wesley Nyirenda	
Nominated	Wilted Phiri	
Nominated	Alexander Grey Zulu	

==== Replacements ====
Original member	Date	Replacement	Notes
Alexander Chikwanda	1981	Henry Meebelo	Nominated
