= Provinces of Zambia =

First-level administrative divisions

- Map of Zambia showing its provinces (2020)
- Category: Unitary state
- Location: Zambia
- Created: 24 October 1964
- Number: 10 Provinces
- Populations: 872,146 (Western Province) – 3,476,384 (Lusaka Province)
- Areas: 21,896 km^{2} (8,454 sq mi) (Lusaka Province) – 126,386 km^{2} (48,798 sq mi) (Western Province)
- Government: Central government
- Subdivisions: Districts; Constituencies

Zambia is divided into ten provinces. The provinces are further subdivided into districts. The Provincial Administration is headed by a Provincial Minister, who is appointed by the President, and is responsible for overseeing the implementation of government policies and coordinating the activities of various government departments within the province. The Provincial Minister is supported by a Provincial Permanent Secretary, who handles the day-to-day administration. Each province has a Provincial Development Coordinating Committee (PDCC) that plays a key role in development planning and coordinating projects within the province.

The current provinces were established following Zambia's independence in 1964, although their borders and functions have evolved over time to support the country’s decentralization efforts.

== List of provinces ==
Province	Capital	Area (km^{2})	Population (2022)	Density (people/km^{2})	Districts	Map
Central (Note: Lusaka province was split from Central province in 1973. Initially Lusaka province was only 360 km2, but by 1988 it had been enlarged to its present size.)	Kabwe	94,394	2,252,483	23.9	11	
Copperbelt (Note: The Copperbelt province was known as Western Province until 1969. At the same time the name of the Barotseland province was changed to Western province.)	Ndola	31,328	2,757,539	88	10	
Eastern	Chipata	51,476	2,454,788	35.6	15	
Luapula	Mansa	50,567	1,514,011	29.9	12	
Lusaka	Lusaka	21,896	3,079,964	140.1	6	
Muchinga (Note: Created in November 2011, consisting of 5 districts from Northern Province and one from Eastern.)	Chinsali	87,806	918,296	13.1	8	
Northern	Kasama	77,650	1,618,412	20.8	12	
North-Western	Solwezi	125,826	1,270,028	10.1	11	
Southern	Choma	85,283	2,381,728	27.7	15	
Western	Mongu	126,386	1,363,520	10.8	16	
Zambia	Lusaka	752,612	19,610,769	26.1	116	

== Administration ==
The provincial government in Zambia is primarily established for administrative purposes. Each province is headed by a Provincial Minister appointed by the President, who oversees the implementation of national policies and government programs at the provincial level. The administrative head of each province is the Provincial Permanent Secretary, also appointed by the President, who is responsible for the day-to-day administration of the province. Supporting the Permanent Secretary are the Deputy Permanent Secretary, heads of government departments, and other civil servants at the provincial level.

Provinces are further divided into districts, with 116 districts across the 10 provinces. Each district (except for Mafinga and Kanchibiya) shares its name with its headquarters. Within each district, there is a council headed by an elected representative known as a Councilor. Councilors hold office for five years and play a key role in local governance.

The administrative staff of the council is selected by the Local Government Service Commission, either from within or outside the district. The office of the provincial government is located in each district headquarters and includes provincial local government officers and auditors.

Each council is responsible for raising and collecting local taxes. These funds are crucial for the council's operations, which include maintaining infrastructure and delivering services. The council's budget is audited annually and submitted to the central government for review. Councilors do not receive salaries but are compensated with allowances funded by the council.

Zambia’s provinces are predominantly rural, with only five city councils, namely Lusaka, Ndola, Kitwe, Livingstone and Chipata. The Zambian government has outlined 63 different functions for the councils, focusing mainly on infrastructure management and local administration. These functions include maintaining community centers, parks, drainage systems, playgrounds, cemeteries, libraries, museums, and art galleries.

In addition to these responsibilities, councils collaborate with specific government departments to support agriculture, natural resource conservation, postal services, and the establishment and maintenance of hospitals, schools, and colleges. The councils also prepare schemes to encourage community participation and development at the local level.

== Primary data ==
Western Province is the largest in terms of area, having 126,386 km^{2}, while Lusaka Province was the smallest with 21,896 km^{2}. In terms of population, Lusaka District is the most populated and most densely populated with a population of 2,204,059 and density of 140 persons per km^{2} as of the 2022 Zambian census. As of 2010, Western Province had the highest sex ratio of 108 females for every 100 males, while Copperbelt had the lowest of 101. Northern had the highest number of basic schools, while Copperbelt had the highest number of high schools. The unemployment rate of youth (55%) and general unemployment rate (32%) was the highest in Copperbelt province, while Eastern had the lowest unemployment rate of 6 per cent. AIDS death was maximum in Copperbelt with 26,799 recorded deaths in 2010, while it was lowest in North-Western with 2,859 recorded deaths. Lusaka Province had the most doctors and fewest malaria related incidents, while North-Western has the lowest number of doctors.

Primary data of Zambia Provinces
Parameter	Year	Central	Copperbelt	Eastern	Luapula	Lusaka	Muchinga Province	Northern	North-Western	Southern	Western
Capital		Kabwe	Ndola	Chipata	Mansa	Lusaka	Chinsali	Kasama	Solwezi	Choma	Mongu
Provincial Minister	2022	Hon. Mwabashike Nkulukusa	Hon. Elisha Matambo	Hon. Peter Phiri	Hon. Njavwa Simutowe	Hon. Sheal Mulyata	Hon. Henry Sikazwe	Hon. Leonard Mbao	Hon. Robert Lihefu	Hon. Credo Nanjuwa	Hon. Kapelwa Mbangweta
Land area, km^{2}		94,394	31,328	51,476	50,567	21,896	87,806	77,650	125,826	85,283	126,386
Population, persons	2022	2,252,483	2,757,539	2,454,788	1,514,011	3,079,964	918,296	1,618,412	1,270,028	2,381,728	1,363,520
Population density, people per km^{2}	2022	24	88	36	30	140	13	21	10	28	11
Sex Ratio (females per 100 males)	2010	102	101	103	103	102	103	102	103	104	108
Basic Schools	2004	653	856	861	527	502	No data	1,208	536	995	648
High Schools	2004	28	71	41	20	39	No data	26	23	45	26
Out of School Children Aged 7–15	2004	33,081	14,332	132,728	58,887	90,620	No data	22,348	26,834	30,390	36,984
Unemployment rate (%)	2008	9	32	6	6	31	No data	7	14	7	10
Unemployment rate, Youth (%)	2008	18	55	12	14	52	No data	012	31	6	18
Doctors	2005	035	213	36	30	231	No data	40	25	50	46
Malaria Incidence rate per 1,000 population	2005	331	377	447	407	313	No data	331	439	344	430
AIDS Deaths	2010	9,016	26,799	9,338	5,209	15,429	No data	6,958	2,859	12,403	6,044

== Economy ==
Agriculture is the major profession in most of the provinces in Zambia. Maize, mixed beans, rice, sorghum, soya beans, sunflower, sweet potatoes and wheat are the major crops in the provinces. Among all provinces, Central had the maximum area, 391,593.23 ha (967,647.9 acres), constituting 20.64 per cent of the total, while Luapula had the smallest area at 3.06 per cent. Maize production was maximum in Eastern (22.5%), mixed beans (51.66%) in Northern, sorghum in Southern (40.62%), sunflower in Eastern (70.2%), soya beans (45.06%), sweet potatoes (28.5%) and wheat (49.51%) in Central Province.

Agriculture data of Zambia Provinces in 2014
Paramaeter	Central	Copperbelt	Eastern	Luapula	Lusaka	Muchinga Province	Northern	North-Western	Southern	Western
Area Planted (HA)	391,593.23	122,525.52	387,273.09	57,966.31	82,603.72	112,345.23	191,104.56	79,528.80	360,160.32	112,153.47
Maize Production	723,760.85	235,415.71	745,580.30	131,746.91	148,290.62	244,978.50	283,755.88	160,866.33	597,999.41	78,276.86
Mixed Beans Production	5,316.43	1,213.88	2,794.77	4,130.48	673.80	9,277.33	31,898.08	4,446.71	1,685.30	312.13
Rice Production	017.85	004.24	900.37	2,254.43	036.53	6,928.63	18,169.24	445.61	021.22	20,861.51
Sorghum Production	452.85	587.45	200.49	105.83	320.21	3,118.55	283.55	1,038.13	4,694.90	755.44
Soya Beans Production	96,518.03	37,609.86	17,534.11	430.00	32,237.44	2,245.70	4,742.11	579.67	22,203.88	077.92
Sun Flower Production	2,872.09	028.67	24,053.17	005.58	049.21	432.17	764.17	014.86	6,042.08	001.66
Sweet Potatoes Production	42,787.85	11,603.63	7,842.74	11,356.02	4,689.72	18,151.34	11,636.01	8,200.76	31,048.67	2,841.24
Wheat Production	99,758.27	28,690.00	120.00	000.00	48,509.73	000.00	000.00	000.00	24,426.13	000.00
Grand Total	971,484.23	315,153.44	799,025.94	150,029.26	234,807.26	285,132.23	351,249.04	175,592.09	688,121.60	103,126.75

Maize Production 2022/2023 Trade Year
	Central	Copperbelt	Eastern	Luapula	Lusaka	Muchinga	Northern	North-Western	Southern	Western	Total
Area Harvested	266,864	109,399	272,019	67,117	66,765	84,533	152,028	77,014	235,349	87,282	1,418,370
Production (MT)	681,913	317,771	544,303	174,106	138,395	258,318	376,133	225,296	448,479	96,971	3,261,685
Percentage Contribution	21%	10%	17%	5%	4%	8%	12%	7%	14%	3%	100%
Yield (MT/Ha)	2.6	2.9	2.0	2.6	2.1	3.0	2.5	2.9	1.9	1.1	2.3

== Human development ==
This is a list of 9 provinces by Human Development Index as of 2017.

Medium Human Development
Rank	Province	2017 HDI
1	Lusaka	0.672
2	Copperbelt	0.670
3	Southern	0.590
-	Zambia (average)	0.589
4	Central	0.572
5	North-Western	0.564
Low Human Development
6	Northern	0.538
7	Western	0.531
8	Luapula	0.528
9	Eastern	0.507

== See also ==
- Districts of Zambia
- Subdivisions of Zambia
- Bibliography of the history of Zambia
- ISO 3166-2:ZM
