= Sylvia Masebo =

Zambian politician

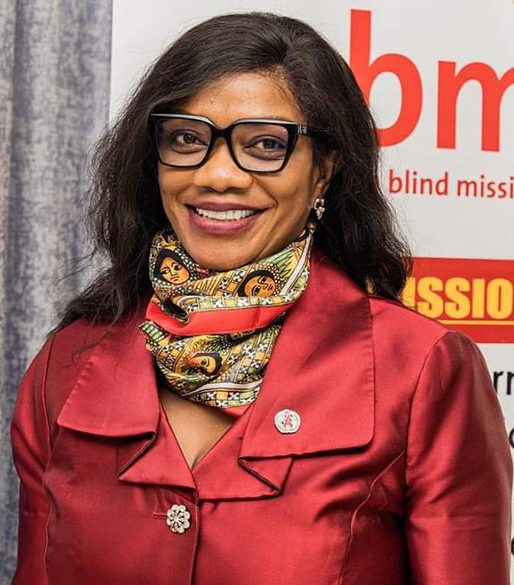
- Masebo in 2022

Member of the National Assembly for Chongwe
- In office August 2021 – May 2026
- Preceded by: Japhen Mwakalombe
- Succeeded by: Anita Kamanga
- In office December 2001 – May 2016
- Preceded by: Gibson Nkausu
- Succeeded by: Japhen Mwakalombe

Minister for Local Government and Housing
- In office 2003–2005
- President: Levy Mwanawasa
- Preceded by: Michael Mabenga
- Succeeded by: Andrew Mulenga
- In office 2006–2008
- President: Levy Mwanawasa
- Preceded by: Andrew Mulenga
- Succeeded by: Ben Tetamashimba

Minister of Tourism and Arts
- In office July 2012 – 20 March 2014
- President: Michael Sata
- Preceded by: Catherine Namugala
- Succeeded by: Jean Kapata

Minister of Health
- In office October 2005 – 2006
- President: Levy Mwanawasa
- Preceded by: Brian Chituwo
- Succeeded by: Angela Cifire
- In office September 2021 – 21 July 2024
- President: Hakainde Hichilema
- Preceded by: Jonas Chanda
- Succeeded by: Elijah Muchima

Minister of Lands and Natural Resources
- Incumbent
- Assumed office 22 July 2024
- President: Hakainde Hichilema
- Preceded by: Elijah Muchima
- Succeeded by: Patrick Mucheleka

Personal details
- Born: 7 March 1963 (age 63)
- Party: MMD (1990–1998/9); ZRP (2001–2006); MMD (2006–2011); PF (2011–2014); UPND (2015–present)

Sylvia Masebo (born March 7, 1963) is a Zambian entrepreneur and politician who served as the National Assembly of Zambia representative for Chongwe constituency on two occasions (2001 to 2016 and 2021 to 2026). Sylvia Masebo holds a degree in Banking and Finance. She first stood on the ticket of Zambian Republican Party (ZRP) in 2001, then the Movement for Multi-Party Democracy (MMD) in 2006, then the Patriotic Front (PF) in 2011, and then the United Party for National Development in 2021. She is the current Minister of Lands and Natural Resources in Zambia. She previously held positions as the Minister of Health on two occasions (2005 - 2006 and 2021 - 2024), as the Minister of Local Government on two occasions (2003 - 2005 and 2006 - 2008) and as the Minister of Tourism and Arts (2012 - 2014).

== Political career ==
Sylvia Masebo came to public prominence in the 1990s as Deputy Mayor of Lusaka and MMD Deputy Treasurer. Even before the mass defections from the MMD in response to Chiluba’s third-term ambitions, Masebo had led a large group of dissatisfied MMD members out of the party. By the time of the 2001 general election, she had joined the newly established Zambia Republican Party (ZRP), headed by former Minister of Defence Benjamin Mwila. On the ZRP ticket, she was elected as a parliamentarian in Chongwe Constituency.

In 2003, Masebo was one of the opposition parliamentarians who were co-opted by Levy Mwanawasa into his Cabinet, becoming Minister for Local Government and Housing. In August 2005, she was transferred to Health to succeed Brian Chituwo. Masebo was instrumental in politically defending the reversal of the health reforms in Parliament. In 2006, she officially rejoined the MMD and would defend her seat on an MMD ticket in the 2006 general election. Following the elections, she returned to her old post as Minister of Local Government. After Rupiah Banda was elected as the President of Zambia in 2008, Masebo was relieved of her Local Government ministerial duties. She was not in support of Banda’s succession of Mwanawasa. By the time of the 2011 general election, she had joined Michael Sata’s party (the Patriotic Front) but failed to retain her parliamentary seat (MMD won the Chongwe seat).

However, there was a by-election in November 2011, just 2 months after the general election, necessitated by Japhen Mwakalombe's resignation from the MMD. Sylvia Masebo stood again for the Patriotic Front in Chongwe Constituency, which she won.

During Michael Sata's tenure, she was appointed as the Minister of Tourism and Arts in July 2012 and served until 20 March 2014, when she was dismissed.

In July 2015, the Anti-Corruption Commission arrested Ms. Masebo and charged her with two counts of abuse of authority of office when she served as minister of Tourism and Arts. It was alleged that Ms. Masebo cancelled the procurement of a tender process of the Zambia Wildlife Authority (ZAWA) hunting concession. She was acquitted of the charges.

Ahead of the 2016 general election, Sylvia Masebo decided to stand for Chongwe again, this time as the United Party for National Development (UPND) candidate. After losing her seat to Japhen Mwakalombe (who now stood for her previous party, the Patriotic Front), she decided to appeal the results, which was unsuccessful.

In the 2021 general election, she stood again as the UPND candidate for Chongwe, which she won. It was the fourth time that she was elected as the Chongwe Member of Parliament. She was then chosen as Zambia's Health minister for the second time by the newly-voted President Hakainde Hichilema after being appointed firstly in October 2005. On 21 July 2024, the President decided to transfer Sylvia Masebo from her position as Minister of Health to being the Minister of Lands and Natural Resources, thereby exchanging roles with Elijah Muchima.

Ahead of the 2026 general election, Chongwe constituency was split into two constituencies, namely Chongwe West and Chongwe East. Sylvia Masebo was adopted by the UPND to be their candidate in Chongwe East. Masebo finished second in Chongwe East at the 2026 election, with Anita Kamanga (an independent candidate) winning the parliamentary seat.
