= Edify Hamukale =

Zambian politician and Member of Parliament

Hon. Edify Hamukale MP

Provincial Minister for Southern Province
- In office September 2016 – May 2021
- Preceded by: Nathaniel Mubukwanu
- Succeeded by: Cornelius Mweetwa

Personal details
- Born: April 15, 1971 (age 55) Zambia
- Party: UPND (before 2011); PF (2016 - 2021); UPND (2022 - present)
- Spouse: Married
- Education: PhD in Business Administration; Master's in Agriculture
- Profession: Agriculturalist, Politician

Edify Mukambala Hamukale (born 15 April 1971) is a Zambian politician who was a nominated member of parliament and served as the Provincial Minister for Southern Province from 2016 to 2021. He was a member of the Patriotic Front party up to August 2021 and is currently a United Party for National Development member.

== Education ==
He holds a PhD in Business Administration and a Master's in Agriculture.

== Political career ==
Hamukale was a member of the United Party for National Development (UPND) up to June 2011. He was nominated as a member of parliament by President Edgar Lungu after the 2016 general election. He was then appointed as the provincial minister for Southern Province and served in that role up until the term concluded in 2021. He resigned from the Patriotic Front party on 15 August 2021. He then joined the United Party for National Development in July 2022.

== See also ==
- List of members of the National Assembly of Zambia (2016–2021)
