= Japhen Mwakalombe =

Zambian politician (born 1970)

Hon. Japhen Mwakalombe

Member of the National Assembly for Chongwe
- In office August 2016 – August 2021
- Preceded by: Sylvia Masebo
- Succeeded by: Sylvia Masebo

Provincial Minister for Copperbelt Province
- In office February 2018 – May 2021
- President: Edgar Lungu
- Preceded by: Bowman Lusambo
- Succeeded by: Elisha Matambo

Provincial Minister for Lusaka Province
- In office September 2016 – February 2018
- President: Edgar Lungu
- Preceded by: Gerry Chanda
- Succeeded by: Bowman Lusambo

Personal details
- Born: July 11, 1970 (age 55)
- Party: Patriotic Front
- Profession: Marketer, Politician

Japhen Mwakalombe (born 11 July 1970) is a Zambian politician and former Provincial Minister. A member of the Patriotic Front (PF), he served as the Member of Parliament for Chongwe constituency from 2016 to 2021 and held appointments as Provincial Minister in the Lusaka and Copperbelt provinces during that time.

== Early life and education ==
Mwakalombe was born on 11 July 1970. He holds a diploma in Sales Management and Marketing and completed Form V secondary education. Prior to entering politics, he worked professionally as a marketer. He is married.

== Political career ==
In the September 2011 general election, Mwakalombe stood as the Movement for Multi-Party Democracy (MMD) candidate in Chongwe constituency and was elected. However, after the MMD finished as the runners-up in the presidential election, Mwakalombe decided to resign from being an MMD member in order to join the Patriotic Front (PF) and a by-election was held that November in which Sylvia Masebo (who was previously the Chongwe MP) was the PF candidate and was elected. Mwakalombe was then sent to the neighbouring Mozambique to be the High Commissioner for Zambia in that nation up to 2016.

By the time of the August 2016 general election, Masebo had joined the United Party for National Development (UPND) and Mwakalombe took her place as the PF candidate for the election, with Mwakalombe winning the Chongwe MP seat ahead of Masebo.

In September 2016, he was appointed as the Provincial Minister for Lusaka Province by President Edgar Lungu. In February 2018, Mwakalombe was transferred to being the Provincial Minister for Copperbelt Province, thereby exchanging roles with Bowman Lusambo.

In the August 2021 general election, Mwakalombe stood again as the Patriotic Front candidate in Chongwe constituency but finished as the runner-up, with Masebo of the UPND being re-elected.

== See also ==
- Provincial minister (Zambia)
- List of members of the National Assembly of Zambia (2016–2021)
