= Mongu District =

Coordinates: 15°10′S 23°30′E

- District
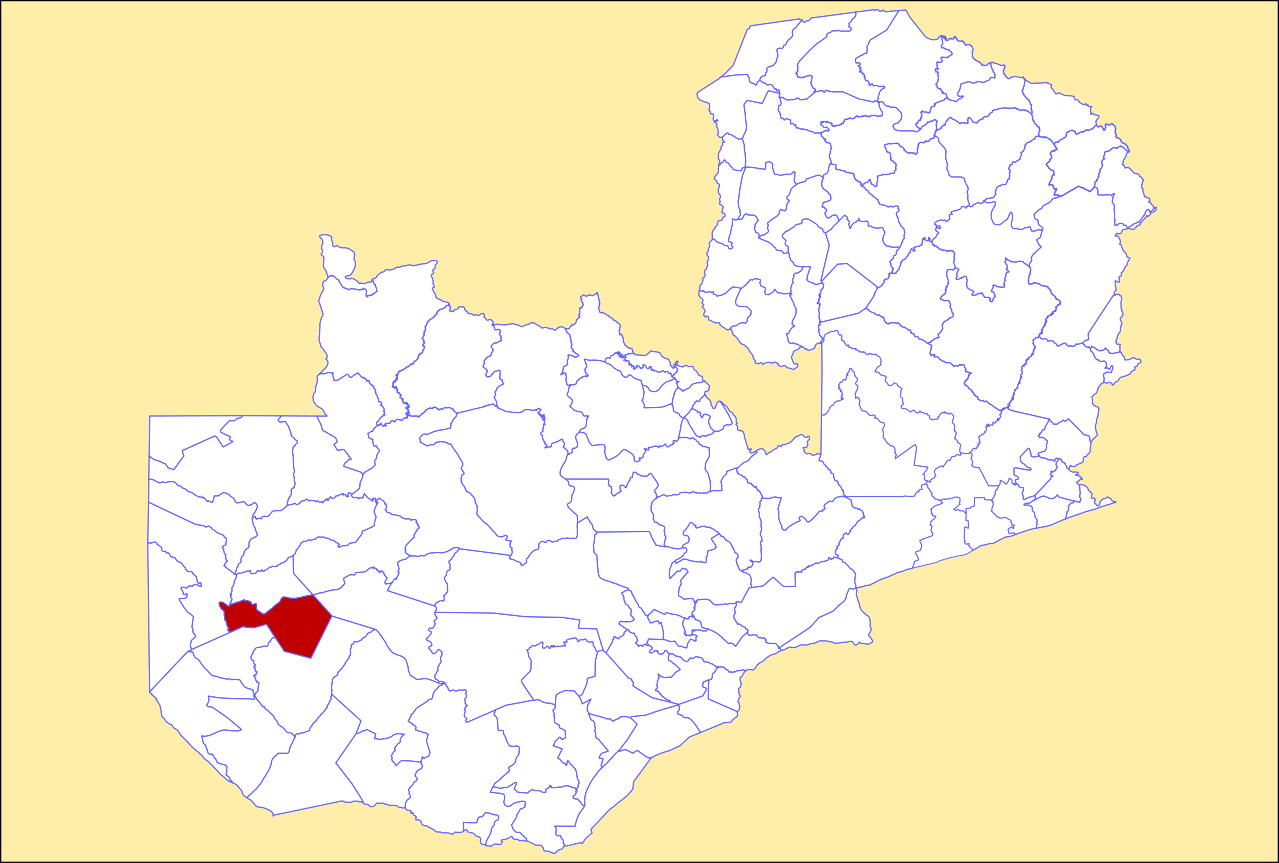
- District location in Zambia
- Country: Zambia
- Province: Western Province
- Capital: Mongu

Area
  - Total: 5,959.8 km^{2} (2,301.1 sq mi)

Population (2022)
  - Total: 197,816
  - Density: 33.192/km^{2} (85.966/sq mi)
- Time zone: UTC+2 (CAT)

Mongu District is a district of Zambia with headquarters at Mongu. As of the 2022 Zambian Census, the district had a population of 197,816 people. More than a quarter of whom live in Mongu town; the remainder live on the floodplain or its edge.

It consists of two constituencies, namely Mongu Central and Nalikwanda.
