= Mongu Central =

Constituency of the National Assembly of Zambia

Mongu Central is a constituency of the National Assembly of Zambia. It covers the western part of Mongu District in Western Province, including Mongu and Lealui.

== List of MPs ==
Election year	MP	Party
Mongu-Lealui
1964	Arthur Wina	United National Independence Party
Mongu
1968	Mufaya Mumbuna	United National Independence Party
1973	Fwanyanga Mulikita	United National Independence Party
1978	Daniel Lisulo	United National Independence Party
1983	Munukayumbwa Sipalo	United National Independence Party
1988	Munukayumbwa Sipalo	United National Independence Party
1991	Akashambatwa Mbikusita-Lewanika	Movement for Multi-Party Democracy
1993 (by-election)	Akashambatwa Mbikusita-Lewanika	National Party
1996	Inonge Mbikusita-Lewanika	Agenda for Zambia
2001	Francis Simenda	United Party for National Development
Mongu Central
2006	Joseph Mulyata	United Party for National Development
2011	Nathaniel Mubukwanu	Patriotic Front
2016	Mwilola Imakando	United Party for National Development
2021	Oliver Amutike	United Party for National Development
2026	Makai Makai	United Party for National Development
