= Provincial minister (Zambia) =

Provincial Ministers are appointed for each province of Zambia.

== List of ministers ==
=== Central ===
Minister	Party	Term start	Term end
Abel Chambeshi	Movement for Multi-Party Democracy		1999
Sydney Chisanga	Movement for Multi-Party Democracy	2006	2007
Davies Chisopa	Patriotic Front	2015	2016
Sydney Mushanga	Patriotic Front	2016	2021
Credo Nanjuwa	United Party for National Development	September 2021	September 2023
Princess Kasune	United Party for National Development	September 2023	June 2024
Mwabashike Nkulukusa	United Party for National Development	June 2024	

=== Copperbelt ===
Minister	Party	Term start	Term end
Bowman Lusambo	Patriotic Front	2016	2018
Japhen Mwakalombe	Patriotic Front	2018	2021
Elisha Matambo	United Party for National Development	2021	

=== Eastern ===
Minister	Party	Term start	Term end
Charles Banda	Patriotic Front	2011	2012
Sichone Malozo	Patriotic Front	2012	2016
Makebi Zulu	Patriotic Front	2016	2021
Peter Phiri	United Party for National Development	2021	2026

=== Luapula ===
Minister	Party	Term start	Term end
Fwanyanga Mulikita	United National Independence Party	1969	1970
Nickson Chilangwa	Patriotic Front	2016	2021
Derricky Chilundika	United Party for National Development	2021	2023
Njavwa Simutowe	United Party for National Development	2023	

=== Lusaka ===
Minister	Party	Term start	Term end
Austin Liato	Movement for Multi-Party Democracy	2005	2006
Gerry Chanda	Patriotic Front	2011	2012
Japhen Mwakalombe	Patriotic Front	2016	2018
Bowman Lusambo	Patriotic Front	2018	2021
Sheal Mulyata	United Party for National Development	2021	

=== Muchinga ===
Minister	Party	Term start	Term end
Sichone Malozo	Patriotic Front	2011	2012
Charles Banda	Patriotic Front	2012	2013
Gerry Chanda	Patriotic Front	2013	2015
Henry Malama	Patriotic Front	2015	2016
Sichone Malozo	Patriotic Front	2016	2021
Henry Sikazwe	United Party for National Development	2021	

=== North-Western ===
Minister	Party	Term start	Term end
Nathaniel Mubukwanu	Patriotic Front	2013	2015
Dawson Kafwaya	Patriotic Front	2015	2016
Richard Kapita	Patriotic Front	2016	2018
Nathaniel Mubukwanu	Patriotic Front	2018	2021
Robert Lihefu	United Party for National Development	2021	

=== Northern ===
Minister	Party	Term start	Term end
Lameck Chibombamilimo	Movement for Multi-Party Democracy	2006	2008
Gerry Chanda	Patriotic Front	2012	2013
Brian Mundubile	Patriotic Front	2016	2019
Lazarous Chungu	Patriotic Front	2019	2021
Leonard Mbao	United Party for National Development	2021	

=== Southern ===
Minister	Party	Term start	Term end
Nathaniel Mubukwanu	Patriotic Front	2015	2016
Edify Hamukale	Patriotic Front	2016	2021
Cornelius Mweetwa	United Party For Natural Development	2021	2023
Credo Nanjuwa	United Party for National Development	2023	2026

=== Western ===
Minister	Party	Term start	Term end
Nathaniel Mubukwanu	Patriotic Front	2016	2018
Richard Kapita	Patriotic Front	2018	2021
Kapelwa Mbangweta	United Party for National Development	2021	

== Deputy ministers ==
Province	Deputy minister	Party	Term start	Term end
Copperbelt	Mathew Mulanda	Movement for Multi-Party Democracy	1997	2006
