= Sichone Malozo =

Zambian politician (born 1978)

Hon. Sichone Malozo

Provincial Minister for Muchinga Province
- In office August 2016 – May 2021
- President: Edgar Lungu
- Preceded by: Henry Malama
- Succeeded by: Henry Sikazwe
- In office November 2011 – November 2012
- President: Michael Sata
- Preceded by: Position created
- Succeeded by: Charles Banda

Provincial Minister for Eastern Province
- In office November 2012 – May 2016
- President: Michael Sata; Guy Scott (acting); Edgar Lungu
- Preceded by: Charles Banda
- Succeeded by: Makebi Zulu

Member of the National Assembly for Isoka
- In office September 2011 – August 2021
- Preceded by: Paul Sichamba
- Succeeded by: Marjorie Nakaponda
- Incumbent
- Assumed office August 2026
- Preceded by: Marjorie Nakaponda

Personal details
- Born: August 13, 1978 (age 48)
- Party: Patriotic Front (2011 to 2026); NRPUP (2026 to present)
- Profession: Development planner, Politician

Sichone Malozo (born 13 August 1978) is a Zambian politician and development planner. He served as a Member of the National Assembly for the Isoka constituency from 2011 to 2021 and held positions as Provincial Minister for both the Eastern and Muchinga provinces during the Patriotic Front (PF) administration.

== Early life and education ==
Malozo holds a Bachelor of Arts degree in Development Studies. Prior to entering politics, he worked as a development planner.

== Political career ==
Malozo entered politics under the Patriotic Front (PF) and was elected to the National Assembly representing Isoka in the 2011 general election. He was re-elected in the 2016 general election.

In November 2011, President Michael Sata appointed him as the first Provincial Minister for the newly-created Muchinga Province. In November 2012, he was transferred to being the Provincial Minister for Eastern Province. He continued being the Eastern Province provincial minister under Acting President Guy Scott and later under President Edgar Lungu.

In 2016, he was reassigned as the Provincial Minister for Muchinga Province. In July 2018, while serving as minister, he publicly denied rumors that any District Commissioner in Muchinga Province had been dismissed, defending the stability of the provincial administration.

Ahead of the 2021 general election, Malozo was not re-adopted as the Patriotic Front candidate for Isoka constituency. Marjorie Nakaponda was chosen instead.

Malozo was adopted by the National Reconciliation Party for Unity and Prosperity to be their candidate in Isoka constituency at the 2026 general election and he was elected.
