= Stella Biemba Chilonda =

Zambian politician

- Chilonda at the National Assembly of Zambia, 2026

Member of Parliament for Mumbwa West
- Incumbent
- Assumed office 2026

Personal details
- Born: November 9, 1969 Mufulira, Zambia
- Party: United Party for National Development
- Occupation: Politician

Stella Biemba Chilonda (born 9 November 1969) is a Zambian politician and former nurse who is a member of the United Party for National Development (UPND). She has served as the Member of Parliament for Mumbwa West since 2026.

== Political career ==
=== Local government ===
Chilonda at her swearing-in as councillor for Nambala Ward

In 2016, Chilonda was approached by the United Party for National Development to contest the Nambala Ward seat; after initially losing the party primaries as the only woman among 19 male aspirants, she was encouraged to continue by the district chairperson and was subsequently adopted as the UPND candidate for Nambala Ward. She was elected councillor for the ward later that year.

Chilonda served as a councillor representing Nambala Ward in Mumbwa District from 2016 to 2021.

During her tenure, Chilonda worked with the ward to identify infrastructure priorities, including boreholes, schools, and health posts, and formed partnerships with donor organisations, including a Norwegian aid group, to fund classroom blocks, a health post, and additional boreholes. Over her term, she helped deliver multiple health facilities, classroom blocks, staff housing, a trading area for women, road grading, bridge construction, and more than fifteen boreholes through such partnerships.

Chilonda has also served as treasurer for the UPND's Mumbwa Central branch and as coordinator of the Mumbwa Women's League, through which she has supported women in accessing Constituency Development Fund grants and loans for small businesses following the 2021 general election.

=== Member of Parliament ===
Chilonda taking the oath of office at the National Assembly of Zambia, 2026

Chilonda was elected as the Member of Parliament for Mumbwa West in the 2026 Zambian general election. The National Assembly of Zambia records her election date as 13 August 2026 and identifies her as a member of the United Party for National Development.

== Early life ==
Chilonda was born in Mufulira and grew up in Luanshya where her father worked as a Police Officer; she was reported to be 56 years old in February 2026. She moved to Western Province when her father relocated after retirement from the police. She trained as a nurse and worked in hospitals in Ndola before relocating to Lusaka following her marriage, where she was employed at Kaunda Square Clinic. She subsequently lived abroad for over a decade, including periods in England, Belgium, Italy, and South Africa, before returning permanently to Zambia in 2014 and settling in Mumbwa to focus on farming.

As a young woman, Chilonda participated in youth activities during the United National Independence Party era, though she did not initially envision a career in politics.
