= Cornelius Mweetwa =

Zambian politician

Minister of Information and Media
- In office 25 September 2023 – 15 May 2026
- President: Hakainde Hichilema
- Preceded by: Chushi Kasanda
- Succeeded by: Elvis Nkandu

Provincial Minister for Southern Province
- In office 7 September 2021 – 24 September 2023
- Preceded by: Edify Hamukale
- Succeeded by: Credo Nanjuwa

Member of the National Assembly for Choma Central
- Incumbent
- Assumed office 2006
- Preceded by: George Chazangwe

Personal details
- Born: 26 February 1976 (age 50) Zambia
- Party: United Party for National Development
- Education: University of Zambia

Cornelius Mweetwa is a Zambian politician. He is the current member of parliament for Choma Central. He is the current party spokesperson for the United Party for National Development (UPND).

== Political career ==
Cornelius Mweetwa was elected as the Choma Central member of parliament at four consecutive elections (2006, 2011, 2016 and 2021) as the United Party for National Development (UPND) candidate. He was appointed as the party spokesperson for the UPND in 2021. He initially decided to withdraw participating in the 2021 parliamentary election before being convinced to rescind his decision.

After the UPND won the 2021 presidential election, President Hakainde Hichilema appointed Mweetwa as the Provincial minister for Southern Province in September 2021. On 24 September 2023, Mweetwa was transferred to being the Minister of Information and Media. As the Minister of Information and Media, Mweetwa also served as the chief government spokesperson.

At the 2026 general election, he was re-elected as the Choma Central member of parliament.
