= Robert Lihefu =

Zambian politician and Minister for Western Province

Hon. Robert Lihefu MP

Provincial Minister for North-Western Province
- In office September 2021 – May 2026
- President: Hakainde Hichilema
- Preceded by: Nathaniel Mubukwanu

Member of the National Assembly for Manyinga
- Incumbent
- Assumed office August 2016
- Preceded by: Danny Ching'imbu

Personal details
- Born: January 1, 1975 (age 51) Zambia
- Party: United Party for National Development
- Occupation: Politician
- Profession: Businessman

Robert Lihefu (born 1 January 1975) is a Zambian politician serving as the Provincial Minister for North-Western Province since 2021 and the Member of the National Assembly for Manyinga Constituency since 2016. He is a member of the United Party for National Development (UPND).

== Political career ==
Lihefu stood as the United Party for National Development candidate in Manyinga constituency at the August 2016 general election and was elected. At the 2021 general election in August 2021, he was re-elected and was appointed as the Provincial Minister for North-Western Province the following month by President Hakainde Hichilema. At the 2026 general election in August 2026, he was re-elected.
