= Chongwe East =

National Assembly constituency in Zambia

Chongwe East is a constituency of the National Assembly of Zambia. It was created in 2026 when Chongwe constituency was split into two constituencies (Chongwe West and Chongwe East). It covers the eastern part of Chongwe District, including Chongwe and Chalimbana.

== List of MPs ==
Election year	MP	Party
Chongwe East
2026	Anita Kamanga	Independent
