= Bowman Lusambo =

Zambian politician

Member of the National Assembly
- In office August 2016 – August 2022
- Constituency: Kabushi

Provincial Minister for Lusaka Province
- In office February 2018 – May 2021
- President: Edgar Lungu
- Preceded by: Japhen Mwakalombe
- Succeeded by: Sheal Mulyata

Provincial Minister for Copperbelt Province
- In office September 2016 – February 2018
- President: Edgar Lungu
- Preceded by: Musenge Mwenya
- Succeeded by: Japhen Mwakalombe

Personal details
- Born: Bowman Lusambo; 9 December 1976 (age 49) Mansa, Zambia
- Party: Patriotic Front
- Children: 3

Bowman Lusambo (born 9 December 1976) is a Zambian politician and a member of the Patriotic Front. He was appointed as the Provincial Minister for Lusaka Province (in February 2018) and Provincial Minister for Copperbelt Province (in August 2016). He has also served as the Member of Parliament for Kabushi from August 2016 to August 2022. In 2022, his parliamentary seat was nullified by the Zambian Constitution Court, citing fraud and violence that led to his 2021 election.

== Biography ==
=== Early life ===
Lusambo was born in Mansa. His family moved to Ndola where he did his primary education at Dola Hill. In 1992, he went to Chifubu Secondary School and later moved to Solwezi Technical Secondary School, where he did his senior secondary course and completed in 1997. He gained admission into Mulungushi University in Kabwe, where he studied sales and marketing management and completed in 2006.

=== Personal life ===
Lusambo is married and has 3 children.

== Career ==
Year (s)	Position	Area served	Political Party
2016 - 2021	Member Of Parliament	Kabushi	Patriotic Front
2016 - 2018	Provincial Minister	Copperbelt Province	Patriotic Front
2018 - 2021	Provincial Minister	Lusaka Province	Patriotic Front
2021 - 2022	Member Of Parliament	Kabushi	Patriotic Front

== ACC arrests ==
In 2022, Lusambo appeared several times in court as some of his properties were believed to have been proceeds of crime. Some of his properties were seized by the Anti Corruption Commission.

After investigations, he pleaded not guilty and his properties were released. Soon after he was released, Lusambo apologized for the attitude and hatred he always showed for President Hichilema. He said it was evident that President HH and his government inflicted pain on his family. Lusambo concluded by saying that from there on he would change his style of 'Politiking'.
