= Richard Kapita =

Zambian politician and Member of Parliament

Hon. Richard Kapita MP

Member of the National Assembly for Mwinilunga West
- In office 2001–2006
- Preceded by: Elizabeth Kalenga
- Succeeded by: Elijah Muchima

Nominated Member of the National Assembly
- In office September 2016 – May 2021

Provincial Minister for North-Western Province
- In office September 2016 – February 2018
- President: Edgar Lungu
- Preceded by: Nathaniel Mubukwanu
- Succeeded by: Nathaniel Mubukwanu

Provincial Minister for Western Province
- In office February 2018 – May 2021
- President: Edgar Lungu
- Preceded by: Nathaniel Mubukwanu
- Succeeded by: Kapelwa Mbangweta

Personal details
- Born: October 21, 1955 (age 70)
- Party: UPND (1998-2015); PF (2015-)
- Education: MBA
- Profession: Politician

Richard Masaiti Kapita (born 21 October 1955) is a Zambian politician who previously served as the member of parliament for Mwinilunga West from 2001 to 2006 and as the provincial minister for both North-Western Province and Western Province between September 2016 and May 2021. He is a member of the Patriotic Front (PF) and was previously a member of the United Party for National Development (UPND).

== Political career ==
Kapita stood as the UPND candidate in Mwinilunga West constituency at the 2001 general election and was elected. He was a member of parliament until the term concluded in 2006. He then became the UPND administrative vice president.

In 2015, Kapita decided to leave the UPND in order to join the Patriotic Front. After Edgar Lungu retained his position as President of Zambia at the 2016 general election, Kapita was listed as a nominated member of parliament in September 2016. At the same time, he was appointed as the provincial minister for North-Western Province. In February 2018, he was appointed the provincial minister for Western Province (thereby exchanging roles with Nathaniel Mubukwanu) until the term concluded in 2021.
