= Lily Monze =

Zambian politician (born 1936)

- Born: 18 April 1936 (age 90); Zambia
- Citizenship: Zambia
- Occupations: Teacher, Politician, Former member of parliament, Ambassador and Writer
- Known for: Women's rights advocacy in Zambia
- Notable work: Rain Child; Beyond the Horizons
- Political party: United National Independence Party (UNIP)

Lily Mubitana Monze (born 1936) is a Zambian teacher, politician, former member of parliament, ambassador and writer. She held multiple ministerial roles in the government of Kenneth Kaunda and was a leading figure in the women's rights movement in Zambia.

== Biography ==
Monze was born in 1936 and was one of the first Zambians to be awarded a university degree. When Zambia gained independence in 1964, she was already working as a teacher. She served on several national educational institutions. In 1967, she participated in her first international feminist conference in Moscow.

Active in the United National Independence Party (UNIP), she became a designated member of the Zambian National Assembly from 1973 to 1978, and was particularly involved in the issue of the representation of women in Zambian political life, becoming a notable feminist leader and women's rights activist. Appointed Minister of State for Planning and Finance in 1973, she was one of the first women ministers in Zambia; she held that ministry until 1975. In 1976, she was appointed Minister of State in the Prime Minister's Office, serving until 1977 in that role, moving to Minister of State for Economic and Technical Cooperation from 1977 to 1978.

In 1991, Kenneth Kaunda organized a free presidential election; he was defeated in this election by Frederick Chiluba, and left power. Under Chiluba's government, in 1992 she was appointed Ambassador of Zambia to France, and held the post until 1996. She subsequently became a member of the steering committee of the United Nations International Research and Training Institute for the Advancement of Women.

== Writing and later life ==
In 2017, Lily Monze published her first children's book, Rain Child, which celebrates African folklore and the importance of cultural storytelling. In 2023, she co-authored Beyond the Horizons, a historical account of Chipembi Girls’ Secondary School, reflecting on the role of missionary education in advancing girls' education in Zambia.
