= Credo Nanjuwa =

Zambian politician (born 1969)

Hon. Credo Nanjuwa

Member of the National Assembly for Itezhi-Tezhi East
- Incumbent
- Assumed office 15 August 2026

Member of the National Assembly for Mumbwa
- In office 13 August 2016 – 15 May 2026
- Preceded by: Brian Chituwo
- Succeeded by: Clarence Chisuku

Provincial Minister for Southern Province
- In office 25 September 2023 – 15 May 2026
- President: Hakainde Hichilema
- Preceded by: Cornelius Mweetwa

Provincial Minister for Central Province
- In office 27 August 2021 – 25 September 2023
- President: Hakainde Hichilema
- Preceded by: Sydney Mushanga
- Succeeded by: Princess Kasune

Personal details
- Born: September 11, 1969 (age 57)
- Party: United Party for National Development
- Profession: Businessman, Politician

Credo Nanjuwa (born 11 September 1969) is a Zambian businessman and politician. He is the current member of parliament for Itezhi-Tezhi East. He served as the Member of Parliament for Mumbwa constituency from 2016 to 2026 during which he was the Provincial Minister for Central Province (September 2021 to September 2023) and Southern Province (September 2023 to May 2026).

== Political career ==
Nanjuwa was first elected to parliament in the 2016 general election as the United Party for National Development (UPND) candidate for Mumbwa constituency. He retained the seat in the 2021 general election, again representing the UPND.

On 27 August 2021, President Hakainde Hichilema appointed him as Provincial Minister for Central Province. He served in that position until a cabinet reshuffle on 25 September 2023, when he was transferred to being the Provincial Minister for Southern Province.

He also met with visiting foreign envoys in his official capacity, including the Chinese Ambassador to Zambia in July 2023, to discuss bilateral cooperation.

In 2026, after 10 years as the MP for Mumbwa Constituency, Nanjuwa decided to stand as the UPND candidate for parliament in Itezhi-Tezhi East at the 2026 general election and he was elected.

== Personal life ==
Nanjuwa is married and represented himself as a businessman prior to full-time public office. He holds an Advanced Diploma in Business.

== See also ==
- Provincial minister (Zambia)
- List of members of the National Assembly of Zambia (2016–2021)
- United Party for National Development
