= Chongwe West =

National Assembly constituency in Zambia

Chongwe West is a constituency of the National Assembly of Zambia. It was created in 2026 when Chongwe constituency was split into two constituencies (Chongwe West and Chongwe East). It covers the western part of Chongwe District, including Palabana, Ngwerere, Lusaka Airport, Silverest and State Lodge.

== List of MPs ==
Election year	MP	Party
2026	Martin Chasha	United Party for National Development
