= Manyinga (constituency) =

Constituency of the National Assembly of Zambia

Manyinga is a constituency of the National Assembly of Zambia. It covers the towns of Katala, Loloma, Manyinga and Nyundu in Manyinga District of North-Western Province. Until 2016, it was named Kabompo East.

== List of MPs ==
Election year	MP	Party
Kabompo East
1991	Anosh Chipawa	Movement for Multi-Party Democracy
1996	Anosh Chipawa	Movement for Multi-Party Democracy
2001	Lucas Chikoti	United Party for National Development
2006	Ronald Mukuma	Movement for Multi-Party Democracy
2011	Danny Ching'imbu	Movement for Multi-Party Democracy
Manyinga
2016	Robert Lihefu	United Party for National Development
2021	Robert Lihefu	United Party for National Development
2026	Robert Lihefu	United Party for National Development
