= Henry Sikazwe =

Zambian politician

Hon. Henry Sikazwe

Provincial Minister for Muchinga Province
- In office 8 September 2021 – 21 February 2025
- President: Hakainde Hichilema
- Preceded by: Sichone Malozo
- Succeeded by: Njavwa Simutowe

Member of the National Assembly for Senga Hill
- In office August 2021 – May 2026
- Preceded by: Kapembwa Simbao
- Succeeded by: Mukwavi Sichula

Personal details
- Born: January 3, 1973 (age 53)
- Party: United Party for National Development
- Profession: Politician

Henry Sikazwe (born 3 January 1973) is a Zambian politician from the United Party for National Development (UPND). He was the Member of Parliament for Senga Hill constituency from August 2021 to May 2026 during which he served as Provincial Minister for Muchinga Province from September 2021 until February 2025.

== Early life and education ==
Sikazwe was born on 3 January 1973. He obtained a Grade 12 secondary school certificate. He is married.

== Political career ==
In the general election of 12 August 2021, Sikazwe was elected to Parliament representing Senga Hill as the UPND candidate.

On 8 September 2021, President Hakainde Hichilema appointed him Provincial Minister for Muchinga Province.

As Minister, he promoted investment in the region, including outreach to Egyptian businesses and support for the Muchinga Investment Expo. In February 2024, he applauded President Hichilema for securing a US $270 million World Bank grant for Muchinga Province road and border-post infrastructure. Sikazwe also strengthened bilateral cooperation, hosting the Chinese Ambassador Du Xiaohui in August 2023 to discuss trade, infrastructure projects and investment opportunities in Muchinga Province.

He worked with the Anti-Corruption Commission as it expanded its presence to Muchinga Province, emphasizing integrity and transparency in governance.

On 21 February 2025, President Hichilema removed Sikazwe from the provincial minister post as part of a cabinet reshuffle.

In July 2025, as MP for Senga Hill, he urged the government to prioritize local communities in issuing gold mining licenses and advocated for safer and regulated mining by locals.

At the 2026 general election, Sikazwe stood as an independent candidate in Senga Hill and Mukwavi Sichula (also an independent candidate) won the parliamentary seat ahead of him.

== Personal life ==
He is married and his profession is listed as a politician. He holds a Grade 12 certificate.

== See also ==
- List of members of the National Assembly of Zambia (2021–2026)
