= Mumbwa West =

National Assembly constituency in Zambia

Mumbwa West is a constituency of the National Assembly of Zambia. It was created in 2026 by splitting Mumbwa constituency. It covers the western part of Mumbwa District.

== List of MPs ==
Election year	MP	Party
2026	Stella Biemba Chilonda	United Party for National Development
