= Nathaniel Mubukwanu =

Zambian politician and Member of Parliament

Hon. Nathaniel Mubukwanu MP3

Member of the National Assembly for Mongu Central
- In office September 2011 – August 2016
- Preceded by: Joseph Mulyata
- Succeeded by: Mwilola Imakando

Nominated Member of Parliament
- In office September 2016 – May 2021

Personal details
- Born: September 26, 1969 (age 56) Zambia
- Party: Patriotic Front
- Spouse: Married
- Education: Bachelor of Arts in Development Studies; Diploma in Philosophy
- Profession: Politician, development specialist

Nathaniel Mubukwanu (born 26 September 1969) is a Zambian politician who was a member of parliament from 2011 to 2021. He was the MP for Mongu Central from 2011 to 2016 and was a nominated MP from 2016 to 2021. He is a member of the Patriotic Front (PF).

== Political career ==
Mubukwanu stood as the Patriotic Front candidate in Mongu Central constituency at the September 2011 general election and was elected. President Michael Sata then appointed him as the Provincial Minister for Western Province that month. He was then transferred to being the Deputy Minister of Sports and Youth in February 2012. He was then transferred to being the Provincial Minister for North-Western Province in February 2013. After President Edgar Lungu won the 2015 presidential by-election, he transferred Mubukwanu to being the Provincial Minister for Southern Province.

After the August 2016 general election, Mubukwanu was declared as a nominated member of parliament the following month and was re-appointed as the Provincial Minister for Western Province by President Lungu. In February 2018, Mubukwanu was re-appointed as the Provincial Minister for North-Western Province (thereby exchanging roles with Richard Kapita) up to May 2021 when the term concluded.
