= Kabushi (constituency) =

Constituency of the National Assembly of Zambia

Kabushi is a constituency of the National Assembly of Zambia. It covers the Kabushi, Lubuto and Masala areas of Ndola in Ndola District of Copperbelt Province.

== List of MPs ==
Election year	MP	Party
Masala
1973	Cosmas Chibanda	United National Independence Party
1978	Cosmas Chibanda	United National Independence Party
Kabushi
1983	Cosmas Chibanda	United National Independence Party
1988	Levi Mbulo	United National Independence Party
1991	Abraham Mokola	Movement for Multi-Party Democracy
1992	Peter Chintala	Movement for Multi-Party Democracy
1996	Peter Chintala	Movement for Multi-Party Democracy
2001	Nedson Nzowa	Heritage Party
2006	Lombani Msichili	Patriotic Front
2011	Dorothy Kazunga	Patriotic Front
2016	Bowman Lusambo	Patriotic Front
2021	Bowman Lusambo	Patriotic Front
2022 (by-election)	Bernard Kanengo	United Party for National Development
2026	Tillas Sichinga	National Reconciliation Party for Unity and Prosperity
