= Chongwe (constituency) =

Constituency of the National Assembly of Zambia

Chongwe was a constituency of the National Assembly of Zambia. It covered the town of Chongwe in Chongwe District of Lusaka Province.

== List of MPs ==
Election year	MP	Party
1983	Elizabeth Mulenje	United National Independence Party
1988	Elizabeth Mulenje	United National Independence Party
1991	Gibson Nkausu	Movement for Multi-Party Democracy
1996	Gibson Nkausu	Movement for Multi-Party Democracy
2001	Sylvia Masebo	Zambia Republican Party
2006	Sylvia Masebo	Movement for Multi-Party Democracy
2011	Japhen Mwakalombe	Movement for Multi-Party Democracy
2011 (by-election)	Sylvia Masebo	Patriotic Front
2016	Japhen Mwakalombe	Patriotic Front
2021	Sylvia Masebo	United Party for National Development
Seat abolished (split into Chongwe West and Chongwe East)

== Election results ==
=== 2011 by-election ===
Candidate	Party	Votes	%
Sylvia Masebo	Patriotic Front	8,607	67.51
Adrian Bauleni	United Party for National Development	3,902	30.61
Johannes Mativenga	United National Independence Party	123	0.96
David Chulu	Forum for Democracy and Development	117	0.92
Total		12,749	100.00
Valid votes		12,749	98.82
Invalid/blank votes		152	1.18
Total votes		12,901	100.00
Registered voters/turnout		52,166	24.73
Source: Election Commission of Zambia
