= Mumbwa Central =

Constituency of the National Assembly of Zambia

Mumbwa Central is a constituency of the National Assembly of Zambia. It covers Mumbwa and several other towns in Mumbwa District of Central Province.

== List of MPs ==
Election year	MP	Party
Mumbwa
1964	Allan Chilimboyi	Zambian African National Congress
Seat abolished (divided into Mumbwa East and Mumbwa West)
1973	Allan Chilimboyi	United National Independence Party
1978	Allan Chilimboyi	United National Independence Party
Seat abolished (divided into Mumbwa East and Mumbwa West)
1991	Makosonke Hlazo	Movement for Multi-Party Democracy
1994 (by-election)	Donald Chivubwe	Movement for Multi-Party Democracy
1996	Donald Chivubwe	Movement for Multi-Party Democracy
2001	Yusuf Badat	United Party for National Development
2006	Brian Chituwo	Movement for Multi-Party Democracy
2011	Brian Chituwo	Movement for Multi-Party Democracy
2016	Credo Nanjuwa	United Party for National Development
2021	Credo Nanjuwa	United Party for National Development
Mumbwa Central
2026	Clarence Chisuku	United Party for National Development
