= Isoka (constituency) =

Constituency of the National Assembly of Zambia

Isoka is a constituency of the National Assembly of Zambia. It covers the towns of Chisato, Isoka, Mpangala and Papote in Isoka District of Muchinga Province.

Known as Isoka West from 1983, the constituency was renamed Isoka in 2011.

== List of MPs ==
Election year	MP	Party
Isoka
1964	Steven Sikombe	United National Independence Party
Isoka West
1968	Wittington Siaklumbi	United National Independence Party
Isoka
1973	Wilfred Siame	United National Independence Party
1978	Leonard Singoyi	United National Independence Party
Isoka West
1983	Blackson Sikanyika	United National Independence Party
1988	Winstone Siame	United National Independence Party
1991	Blackson Sikanyika	Movement for Multi-Party Democracy
1996	Blackwood Sikombe	Independent
2001	Harry Sinkala	Movement for Multi-Party Democracy
2006	Paul Sichamba	Movement for Multi-Party Democracy
Isoka
2011	Sichone Malozo	Patriotic Front
2016	Sichone Malozo	Patriotic Front
2021	Marjorie Nakaponda	Patriotic Front
2026	Sichone Malozo	National Reconciliation Party for Unity and Prosperity
