= Daniel Munkombwe =

Zambian politician

Daniel Munkombwe was a Zambian politician. He worked as a political organizer and administrator for the ZANC in Northern Rhodesia before and after independence. He was elected to Parliament for Choma constituency in 1973 and served for 19 years. In 2001, he was appointed Minister for the Southern Province by Levy Mwanawasa and continued in that and other government posts until 2015, having been subsequently appointed by Rupiah Banda and Michael Sata.

== Early life and education ==
Munkombwe was born on May 16 in Mbole Village in the Choma District of Zambia's Southern Province. He attended primary school at Macha Central and Muyanda Primary, and did his upper standards at Sikalongo Boys School. He then attended Matopo Mission School in Zimbabwe (Southern Rhodesia at the time).

== Political and government positions ==
According to Munkombwe, he was inspired to enter politics by the example of his uncles, Elijah Mudenda, Simon Mudenda and Samspon Mwaanga (father of Vernon J. Mwaanga), all of whom were politically active in the period before independence.

== Chronology ==
The following dates are taken from Munkombwe's autobiography.

1932 - Born, May 16 in Mbole Village
1950 - Attended Sikalongo Mission School
1952 - Attended Matopo Mission School
1953 - Attended African National Conference of Northern Rhodesia at Monze with Joshua Nkomo, Ndabaningi Sithole and Lepold Takawira. Harry Nkumbula and Kenneth Kaunda were elected as new ANC officials.
1955 - Elected Secretary of the Livingstone District of the Northern Rhodesia ANC
1956 - Shop boycott called by Northern Rhodesian ANC to protest mistreatment of black workers
1956 - December 27, married Ellah Moono at Macha Mission
1958 - ANC split into two groups: ANC (led by Nkumbula) and ZANC (led by Kaunda)
1959 - Elected Provincial Vice President of Southern Province ANC
1962 - Elected President of Southern Province ANC
1964 - Independence
1965 - Joined UNIP and became Kalomo Regional Secretary
1968 - Was defeated for Parliament and refused a Civil Service position. Went back to farm.
1972 - "Choma Declaration" signed in Choma Secondary School Hall
1973 - Elected Member of Parliament for Choma Central Constituency
1978 - 2nd election to Parliament
1983 - 3rd election to Parliament. Between 1983-88, appointed Minister of State in the Ministry of Agriculture and Water Development, the Ministry of Tourism, and the Ministry of Lands and Natural Resources
1988 - 4th election to Parliament. Appointed by Kenneth Kaunda as Cabinet Minister for Decentralization.
1991 - Kaunda defeated; multi-party democracy established. Munkombwe defeated as MP for Choma.
1991-2001 - Provincial Chairman of MMD
2001 - defeated a 3rd time.
2001 - Appointed by Levy Mwanawasa as Southern Province Minister. 2015 - Retired to his farm near Choma. 2018 - Passed on early hours of June 15, in Livingstone.

== News Releases of Interest ==
- 2004 - "Munkombwe is New Southern Province MMD Chairman," Times of Zambia.
- 2008 - "Do not Abuse your Appointment, Munkombwe." Lusaka Times, 13 April 2008.
- 2013 - "Old and Tired Daniel Munkombwe bounces back into government." Zambian Eye, 27 March 2013.
- 2014 - "The Lion from Mbole Village – A profile of Daniel Munkombwe." Lusaka Voice, 1 May 2014.
