= Nalikwanda =

Constituency of the National Assembly of Zambia

Nalikwanda is a constituency of the National Assembly of Zambia. It covers the eastern part of Mongu District in Western Province.

== List of MPs ==
Election year	MP	Party
Nalikwanda
1964	Mulenga Nganga	United National Independence Party
1968	Morgan Simwinji	Zambian African National Congress
1973	Situmbeko Ikacana	United National Independence Party
1978	Situmbeko Ikacana	United National Independence Party
1983	Mufaya Mumbuna	United National Independence Party
1988	Namonda Kamayoyo	United National Independence Party
1991	Mufaya Mumbuna	Movement for Multi-Party Democracy
1992 (by-election)	Simwinji Simwinji	Movement for Multi-Party Democracy
1996	Albert Situmbeko	Zambia Democratic Congress
1999 (by-election)	Simwinji Simwinji	Movement for Multi-Party Democracy
2001	Simasiku Kalumiana	United Party for National Development
2006	Geoffrey Lungwangwa	Movement for Multi-Party Democracy
2011	Geoffrey Lungwangwa	Movement for Multi-Party Democracy
2016	Geoffrey Lungwangwa	United Party for National Development
2021	Koonwa Simunji	United Party for National Development
2026	Warren Sibote	United Party for National Development
