= Senga Hill (constituency) =

Zambian National Assembly constituency

Senga Hill is a constituency of the National Assembly of Zambia. It covers the towns of Nendo and Senga Hill in Senga Hill District of the Northern Province. The constituency is home to the Mambwe and Lungu people of Zambia.

== List of MPs ==
Election year	MP	Party
1973	Monica Chintu	United National Independence Party
1978	Telesphore Nsokolo	United National Independence Party
1983	Hynkson Bowa	United National Independence Party
1988	Frederick Simpasa	United National Independence Party
1991	Mathias Mpande	Movement for Multi-Party Democracy
1996	Mathias Mpande	Movement for Multi-Party Democracy
2001	Kapembwa Simbao	Movement for Multi-Party Democracy
2006	Kapembwa Simbao	Movement for Multi-Party Democracy
2011	Kapembwa Simbao	Movement for Multi-Party Democracy
2015 (by-election)	Kapembwa Simbao	Patriotic Front
2016	Kapembwa Simbao	Patriotic Front
2021	Henry Sikazwe	United Party for National Development
2026	Sichula Mukwavi	Independent
