= Choma Central =

Constituency of the National Assembly of Zambia

Choma Central is a constituency of the National Assembly of Zambia. It covers the central part of Choma District in Southern Province, including the town of Choma.

== List of MPs ==
Election year	MP	Party
Choma
1964	Edgar Musangu	Zambian African National Congress
1968	Edward Nyanga	Zambian African National Congress
1968 (by-election)	Peter Muunga	Zambian African National Congress
1973	Daniel Munkombwe	United National Independence Party
1978	Daniel Munkombwe	United National Independence Party
1983	Daniel Munkombwe	United National Independence Party
1988	Daniel Munkombwe	United National Independence Party
1991	Syamukayumbu Syamujaye	Movement for Multi-Party Democracy
1996	Syamukayumbu Syamujaye	Movement for Multi-Party Democracy
2001	Jesse Muleya	United Party for National Development
Choma Central
2006	George Chazangwe	United Party for National Development
2011	Cornelius Mweetwa	United Party for National Development
2016	Cornelius Mweetwa	United Party for National Development
2021	Cornelius Mweetwa	United Party for National Development
2026	Cornelius Mweetwa	United Party for National Development
