= 1988 Zambian general election =

- 26 October 1988
- Presidential election
- Turnout: 58.81%
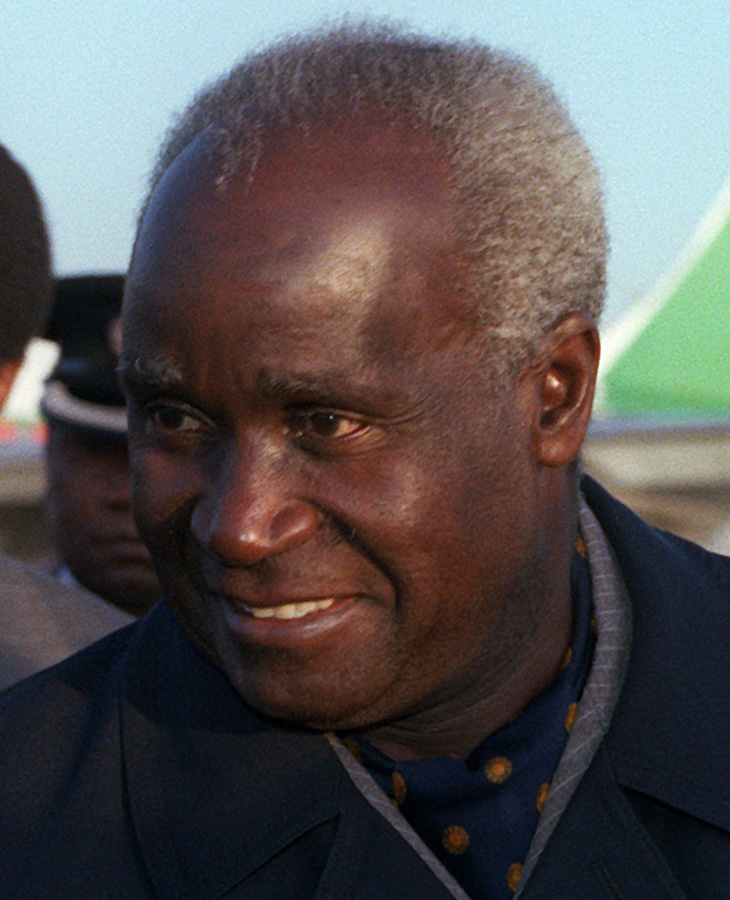
Nominee	Kenneth Kaunda
Party	UNIP
Popular vote	1,414,000
Percentage	95.48%
President before election
Kenneth Kaunda
UNIP
Elected President
Kenneth Kaunda
UNIP

General elections were held in Zambia on 26 October 1988. At the time, the country was a one-party state with the United National Independence Party (UNIP) as the sole legal party. UNIP leader Kenneth Kaunda was automatically re-elected for a sixth five-year term as President with 95.5% of the vote, whilst UNIP also won all 125 seats in the National Assembly. Voter turnout was around 60% in the parliamentary elections, but 58.8% in the presidential elections.

Two years later UNIP was forced to give up its monopoly of power as part of an agreement with the opposition. The next elections had been scheduled for 1993, but snap elections were called in 1991 as a result of the agreement.

== Campaign ==
Prior to the elections, primary elections were held to elect candidates for the 125 constituencies. Only UNIP members could vote in the primaries, and the top three candidates would be able to stand for the National Assembly election. In total, 706 people stood for election to the National Assembly, of which 612 were approved by the UNIP central committee.

== Results ==
=== President ===
Kaunda was the sole candidate for president, and voters voted yes or no to his candidacy.

Candidate	Party	Votes	%
Kenneth Kaunda	United National Independence Party	1,414,000	95.48
Against		67,000	4.52
Total		1,481,000	100.00
Valid votes		1,481,000	96.86
Invalid/blank votes		48,000	3.14
Total votes		1,529,000	100.00
Registered voters/turnout		2,600,000	58.81
Source: Nohlen et al.

=== National Assembly ===
Party	Votes	%	Seats	+/–
United National Independence Party			125	0
Presidential appointees			10	0
Appointed Speaker			1	0
Total			136	0
Registered voters/turnout	2,600,000	–		
Source: African Elections Database

== Aftermath ==
Following protests, riots and an attempted coup in 1990, the constitution was amended to allow other parties to challenge UNIP in the 1991 elections.

== See also ==
- List of members of the National Assembly of Zambia (1988–91)
