= 1996 Zambian general election =

- 18 November 1996
- Presidential election
- Registered: 2,267,382
- Turnout: 58.44%
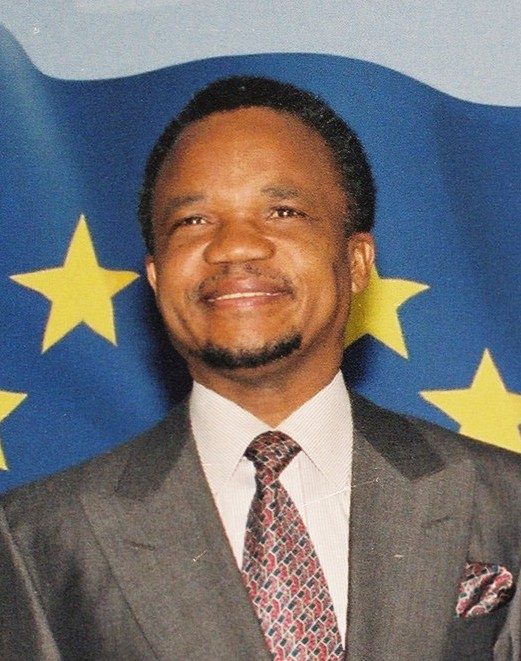

Nominee	Frederick Chiluba	Dean Mungomba	Humphrey Mulemba
Party	MMD	ZADECO	NP
Popular vote	913,770	160,439	83,875
Percentage	72.59%	12.75%	6.66%
- Presidential results by National Assembly constituency
President before election
Frederick Chiluba
MMD
Elected President
Frederick Chiluba
MMD

General elections were held in Zambia on 18 November 1996 to elect a President and National Assembly. They were boycotted by the main opposition party, the United National Independence Party, together with five other allied parties, following changes to the constitution which they failed to have reversed following a court challenge. The changes imposed a two-term limit on the presidency, required presidential candidates to be born to two Zambian citizens by birth or descent, and required National Assembly candidates to give up their chieftaincy. UNIP believed these changes were specifically aimed at their longtime leader, Kenneth Kaunda, whose parents were Malawian and had previously served as the country's first president from 1964 to 1991. The changes would have also excluded UNIP's vice president, a chief. Subsequently, the ruling Movement for Multi-Party Democracy won a comfortable victory in both elections, taking 131 of the 150 elected seats in the National Assembly, and its candidate, Frederick Chiluba, winning 73% of the vote in the presidential election.

Out of an estimated 4,500,000 eligible voters, only 2,267,382 registered. Amongst registered voters, turnout was 58%.

== Results ==
=== President ===
Candidate	Party	Votes	%
Frederick Chiluba	Movement for Multi-Party Democracy	913,770	72.59
Dean Mungomba	Zambia Democratic Congress	160,439	12.75
Humphrey Mulemba	National Party	83,875	6.66
Akashambatwa Mbikusita-Lewanika	Agenda for Zambia	59,250	4.71
Chama Chakomboka	Movement for Democratic Process	41,471	3.29
Total		1,258,805	100.00
Valid votes		1,258,805	95.00
Invalid/blank votes		66,248	5.00
Total votes		1,325,053	100.00
Registered voters/turnout		2,267,382	58.44
Source: Electoral Commission

=== National Assembly ===
Party	Votes	%	Seats	+/–
Movement for Multi-Party Democracy	778,989	60.88	131	+6
Zambia Democratic Congress	176,521	13.79	2	New
National Party	90,823	7.10	5	New
National Lima Party	81,876	6.40	0	New
Agenda for Zambia	18,982	1.48	2	New
National Congress	2,313	0.18	0	New
Liberal Progressive Front	759	0.06	0	New
Movement for Democratic Progress	632	0.05	0	New
United National Independence Party	477	0.04	0	–25
Party for Poor People	293	0.02	0	New
Real Democracy Party	182	0.01	0	New
Independents	127,760	9.98	10	+10
Presidential appointees			8	0
Appointed speaker			1	0
Total	1,279,607	100.00	159	0
Valid votes	1,279,607	95.99		
Invalid/blank votes	53,462	4.01		
Total votes	1,333,069	100.00		
Registered voters/turnout	2,267,382	58.79		
Source: Electoral Commission

== See also ==
- List of members of the National Assembly of Zambia (1996–2001)
