= 2016 Zambian general election =

- 11 August 2016
- Presidential election
- Registered: 6,698,372
- Turnout: 56.45% (▲24.09 pp)
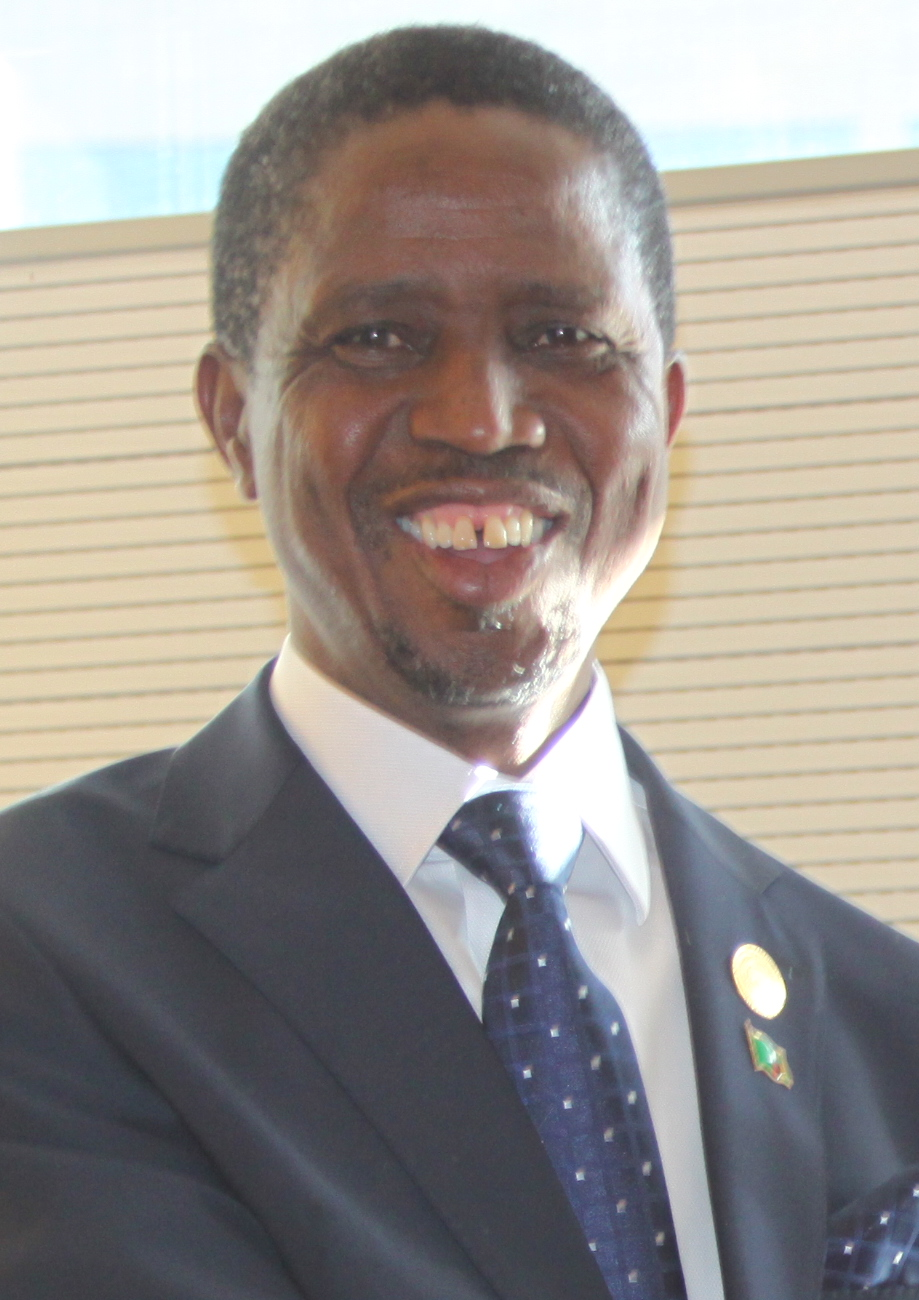

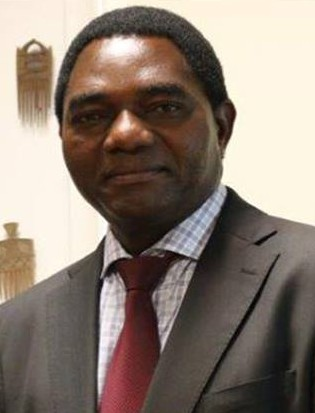
Nominee	Edgar Lungu	Hakainde Hichilema
Party	PF	UPND
Running mate	Inonge Wina	Geoffrey Mwamba
Popular vote	1,860,877	1,760,347
Percentage	50.35%	47.63%

Lungu
60-70%
70-80%
80-90%
Hichilema
50-60%
80-90%
>90%
President before election
Edgar Lungu
PF
Elected President
Edgar Lungu
PF
- Parliamentary election
- 156 of the 167 seats in the National Assembly; 84 seats needed for a majority
- Turnout: 56.03% (▲2.40 pp)
Party	Leader	Vote %	Seats	+/–
PF	Edgar Lungu	42.01	80	+20
UPND	Hakainde Hichilema	41.66	58	+30
MMD	Nevers Mumba	2.71	3	−52
FDD	Edith Nawakwi	2.17	1	0
Independents	–	9.48	14	+11
This lists parties that won seats. See the complete results below.
Speaker of the National Assembly before	Speaker of the National Assembly after
Patrick Matibini; PF	Patrick Matibini; PF

General elections were held in Zambia on 11 August 2016 to elect the President and National Assembly. A constitutional referendum was held alongside the elections, with proposals to amend the bill of rights and Article 79.

President Edgar Lungu, previously elected in January 2015 to finish the term of Michael Sata, who died in office, was re-elected for a full five-year term with a majority of the vote in the first round, defeating opposition leader Hakainde Hichilema. Lungu's Patriotic Front also won a majority in the National Assembly for the first time, winning 80 of the 156 elected seats. Lungu was inaugurated on 13 September 2016 at the National Heroes Stadium in Lusaka despite opposition.

== Background ==
The previous general elections in 2011 resulted in a victory for the Patriotic Front (PF), whose candidate Michael Sata was elected president, with the PF winning 61 of the 150 seats in the National Assembly. Following Sata's death in October 2014, with acting President Guy Scott constitutionally ineligible to assume the presidency, early presidential elections were held to elect a successor to complete the remainder of his five-year term, and PF candidate Edgar Lungu was elected. Edgar Lungu beat Hakainde Hichilema of the United Party for National Development by just 27,757 votes and the opposition has yet to accept the credibility of the election.

== Electoral system ==
Although previously the President had been elected in a single round of voting by the first-past-the-post system, in 2015 the National Assembly approved the change in the constitution to change to a two-round system. The constitutional change also introduced the concept of running mates; previously the vice president was appointed after the elections. The running mate, now being an elected member, can assume office directly if the president is deemed unfit to rule.

Of the 159 members of the National Assembly, 150 are elected by the first-past-the-post system in single-member constituencies, with a further eight appointed by the President and a Speaker elected from outside the National Assembly.

The voting age is 18, whilst National Assembly candidates must be at least 21.

== Candidates ==
A total of nine candidates along with their running mates registered to run for the presidency. Out of the 46 political parties, only five managed to pay their candidate's deposit by the deadline of 17 May 2016. The deadline was subsequently extended by a day, with four other parties nominating a candidate.

The race was expected to be a close race mainly between Edgar Lungu of the Patriotic Front and Hakainde Hichilema of the United Party for National Development. Both leaders competed in the 2015 presidential elections and Lungu won by a very narrow margin.

Presidential candidate		Running mate	Party
1	Tilyenji Kaunda	Njekwa Ement Anamela	United National Independence Party
2	Nawakwi Zewelani Edith	Clement Mwanza	Forum for Democracy and Development
3	Edgar Lungu	Inonge Wina	Patriotic Front
4	Saviour Chishimba	Sinanzeni Chuma	United Progressive People
5	Wynter Kabimba	Cosmas Musumali	Rainbow Party
6	Peter Sinkamba	Tafeni Clement	Green Party
7	Hakainde Hichilema	Geoffrey Mwamba	United Party for National Development
8	Andyford Banda	Enock Tonga	People's Alliance for Change
9	Maxwell Mwamba	Rosemary Kabungo	Democratic Assembly

== Conduct ==
Both sides traded accusations of inciting violence for political gain; the ruling Patriotic Front accused the United Party for National Development (UPND), of inciting unnecessary violence, and carrying out its "Operation Watermelon" to create tension in the country. In response, the UPND accused the Patriotic Front of politicising state entities against them.

Violent outbreaks occurred in Lusaka after the government made the decision to suspend the operations of The Post newspaper (one of the several independent newspapers in the country) on 10 June. As a result of the violence, the Election Commission suspended campaigning in Lusaka and Namwala for ten days, and the ban on the newspaper was lifted on 18 July. However, on 23 June the government started taking action against The Post for unpaid taxes of around $6 million; the newspaper denied the claim saying the issue was still being discussed in court. The opposition accused the government of silencing the media.

=== Arrests of opposition members ===
On 20 July Geoffrey Bwalya Mwamba, the vice president of the UPND, was arrested along with several party officials with the accusation that they were trying to start a private militia. The police raided his house and found petrol bombs, machetes and spears. The opposition denied the claims, saying that the weapons were planted there after the arrest. The police raided the house following alleged political poster vandals hiding in the house. A total of 28 people were arrested in the raid.

=== Ballot papers ===
There was a lot of controversy in the printing of the ballot papers; previously all ballot papers had been printed in South Africa, but the Electoral commission of Zambia awarded the contract for the 2016 elections to a firm in Dubai. The contract was significantly more expensive and many opposition parties criticised the move. Parties opposed the move as printing the ballot papers outside Africa was expensive to verify and increased the chance of electoral fraud. To counter the suspicion of rigging, the Electoral Commission allowed party officials to travel to Dubai to witness the printing of the ballots; all ballot papers were to be only released if all party officials approved of the process. The printing was completed on 20 July 2016 and the ballots were transported to Zambia on 28 July 2016. However, concerns with respect to the transport and distribution of the ballot papers then arose. The Zambian Air Force were responsible for distributing the ballots across the country.

== Results ==
Results announced by the Electoral Commission on 15 August showed Edgar Lungu winning the presidential election with slightly more than 50% of the vote, ahead of his only major competitor, Hakainde Hichilema, who received almost 48%. Lungu finished a few thousand votes over the threshold for an outright victory.

=== President ===
Candidate	Running mate	Party	Votes	%
Edgar Lungu	Inonge Wina	Patriotic Front	1,860,877	50.35
Hakainde Hichilema	Geoffrey Bwalya Mwamba	United Party for National Development	1,760,347	47.63
Edith Nawakwi	Clement Mwanza	Forum for Democracy and Development	24,149	0.65
Andyford Banda	Enock Tonga	People's Alliance for Change	15,791	0.43
Wynter Kabimba	Cosmas Musumali	Rainbow Party	9,504	0.26
Saviour Chishimba	Sinanzeni Chuma	United Progressive People	9,221	0.25
Tilyenji Kaunda	Njekwa Anamela	United National Independence Party	8,928	0.24
Peter Sinkamba	Clement Tafeni	Green Party of Zambia	4,515	0.12
Maxwell Mwamba	Rosemary Kabungo	Democratic Assembly	2,378	0.06
Total			3,695,710	100.00
Valid votes			3,695,710	97.73
Invalid/blank votes			85,795	2.27
Total votes			3,781,505	100.00
Registered voters/turnout			6,698,372	56.45
Source: Electoral Commission

=== National Assembly ===
Party	Votes	%	Seats	+/–
Patriotic Front	1,537,946	42.01	80	+20
United Party for National Development	1,525,049	41.66	58	+30
Movement for Multi-Party Democracy	99,356	2.71	3	–52
Forum for Democracy and Development	79,489	2.17	1	0
Rainbow Party	34,906	0.95	0	New
National Restoration Party	10,887	0.30	0	0
Alliance for Democracy and Development	8,269	0.23	0	–1
United Democratic Front	7,643	0.21	0	New
United National Independence Party	7,253	0.20	0	0
Golden Progressive Party	1,461	0.04	0	New
Radical Revolutionary Party	831	0.02	0	New
Green Party of Zambia	407	0.01	0	New
United Progressive People	333	0.01	0	New
Independents	347,005	9.48	14	+11
Total	3,660,835	100.00	156	+6
Valid votes	3,660,835	97.55		
Invalid/blank votes	92,044	2.45		
Total votes	3,752,879	100.00		
Registered voters/turnout	6,698,372	56.03		
Source: Electoral Commission

== Reactions ==
=== Domestic ===
- The main opposition accused the electoral commission of participating in fraud as it significantly delayed the announcement of the results.

=== International ===
- European Union: EU observers commended the Zambian people for conducting peaceful elections and deemed the election process free and transparent despite some delays. However, the EU commission accused state media of being unbalanced in its report.
- United States: The US-based Carter Center said that the election was conducted in a highly tense atmosphere and that there was a lot of polarization due to inter-party politics. The center was also concerned by the delay in the announcement of the results by the electoral commission.
- African Union: Goodluck Jonathan, the head of the AU observer mission in Zambia, also deemed election day to have been peaceful. However, like the EU, he noted that state media had been biased towards the ruling party. He also said that holding the referendum at the same time as the elections caused confusion to many voters and added complexity to the election process.
- Southern African Development Community: The SADC observer mission along with COMESA, Commonwealth, and the International Conference on the Great Lakes Region all concluded that the election was conducted in a free and fair environment. Jakaya Kikwete, leader of the Commonwealth observer mission in Zambia, said that pockets of violence in the country and the way the police handled the situation were unfortunate.

== Aftermath ==
PF members took to the street to celebrate Lungu's victory, whilst riots took place in most parts of the country. The UPND rejected the results, saying that the electoral commission had colluded to rig the result in favour of Lungu. The UPND filled a petition to the constitutional court over the recount of votes in Lusaka as major irregularities were reported from the city.

Lungu, who could only be inaugurated seven days after being proclaimed the victor, held a celebratory rally on 16 August for his re-election that secured him another five-year term. He was sworn in on 13 September 2016.

== See also ==
- List of members of the National Assembly of Zambia (2016–21)
