= List of members of the National Assembly of Zambia (2011–2016) =

The members of the National Assembly of Zambia from 2011 until 2016 were elected on 20 September 2011. They consisted of 150 elected members, eight members appointed by the President and the Speaker.

== List of members ==
=== Elected members ===
Constituency	Member	Party
Bahati	Harry Kalaba	Patriotic Front
Bangweulu	Chifita Matafwali	Patriotic Front
Bwacha	Sydney Mushanga	Patriotic Front
Bwana Mkubwa	Emmanuel Chenda	Patriotic Front
Bweengwa	Highvie Hamududu	United Party for National Development
Chadiza	Allan Mbewe	Movement for Multi-Party Democracy
Chama North	Darious Mumba	Movement for Multi-Party Democracy
Chama South	Effron Lungu	Patriotic Front
Chasefu	Chifumu Banda	Forum for Democracy and Development
Chavuma	Kenneth Konga	Movement for Multi-Party Democracy
Chawama	Edgar Lungu	Patriotic Front
Chembe	Mwansa Mbulakulima	Movement for Multi-Party Democracy
Chiengi	Benson Kapaya	Patriotic Front
Chifubu	Berina Kawandami	Patriotic Front
Chifunabuli	Mutaba Mwali	Patriotic Front
Chikankata	Munji Habeenzu	United Party for National Development
Chilanga	Keith Mukata	Movement for Multi-Party Democracy
Chililabombwe	Esther Banda	Patriotic Front
Chilubi	Obius Chisala	Patriotic Front
Chimbamilonga	Hastings Chansa	Patriotic Front
Chimwemwe	Musenge Mwenya	Patriotic Front
Chingola	Joseph Katema	Patriotic Front
Chinsali	Christopher Mulenga	Patriotic Front
Chipangali	Vincent Mwale	Movement for Multi-Party Democracy
Chipata Central	Reuben Mtolo	Movement for Multi-Party Democracy
Chipili	Davies Mwila	Patriotic Front
Chisamba	Moses Muteteka	Movement for Multi-Party Democracy
Chitambo	Mushili Malama	Movement for Multi-Party Democracy
Choma	Cornelius Mweetwa	United Party for National Development
Chongwe	Japhen Mwakalombe	Movement for Multi-Party Democracy
Dundumwenzi	Edgar Sing'ombe	United Party for National Development
Feira	Patrick Ngoma	Movement for Multi-Party Democracy
Gwembe	Brian Ntundu	United Party for National Development
Ikeleng'i	Elijah Muchima	Movement for Multi-Party Democracy
Isoka	Sichone Malozo	Patriotic Front
Itezhi-Tezhi	Greyford Monde	United Party for National Development
Kabompo East	Danny Ching'imbu	Movement for Multi-Party Democracy
Kabompo West	Ambrose Lufuma	United Party for National Development
Kabushi	Dorothy Kazunga	Patriotic Front
Kabwata	Given Lubinda	Patriotic Front
Kabwe Central	James Kapyanga	Patriotic Front
Kafue	Obvious Mwaliteta	Patriotic Front
Kafulafuta	James Chishiba	Movement for Multi-Party Democracy
Kalabo Central	Chinga Miyutu	United Party for National Development
Kalomo Central	Request Muntanga	United Party for National Development
Kalulushi	Rayford Mbulu	Patriotic Front
Kamfinsa	Moses Chishimba	Patriotic Front
Kanchibiya	Davies Mwango	Patriotic Front
Kankoyo	Levy Chabala	Patriotic Front
Kantanshi	Yamfwa Mukanga	Patriotic Front
Kanyama	Gerry Chanda	Patriotic Front
Kaoma Central	Carlos Antonio	United Party for National Development
Kapiri Mposhi	Lawrence Zimba	Movement for Multi-Party Democracy
Kapoche	Nicholas Banda	Movement for Multi-Party Democracy
Kaputa	Maxas Ng'onga	Patriotic Front
Kasama Central	Geoffrey Bwalya Mwamba	Patriotic Front
Kasempa	Kabinga Pande	Movement for Multi-Party Democracy
Kasenengwa	Victoria Kalima	Movement for Multi-Party Democracy
Katombola	Derick Livune	United Party for National Development
Katuba	Patrick Mwewa	Movement for Multi-Party Democracy
Kawambwa	Nickson Chilangwa	Patriotic Front
Keembe	Ronald Shikapwasha	Movement for Multi-Party Democracy
Kwacha	Boniface Mutale	Patriotic Front
Liuwa	Situmbeko Musokotwane	Movement for Multi-Party Democracy
Livingstone	Lukulo Katombora	Movement for Multi-Party Democracy
Luampa	Josephine Limata	Movement for Multi-Party Democracy
Luangeni	Charles Zulu	Independent
Luanshya	Stephen Chungu	Patriotic Front
Luapula	Emerine Kabanshi	Patriotic Front
Lubansenshi	Patrick Mucheleka	Independent
Luena	Mwambwa Imenda	Alliance for Democracy and Development
Lufwanyama	Annie Munshya	Movement for Multi-Party Democracy
Lukashya	Alfreda Mwamba	Patriotic Front
Lukulu East	Christopher Kalila	Movement for Multi-Party Democracy
Lumezi	Isaac Banda	Movement for Multi-Party Democracy
Lundazi	Mkhondo Lungu	Movement for Multi-Party Democracy
Lunte	Felix Mutati	Movement for Multi-Party Democracy
Lupososhi	Lazarous Chungu	Patriotic Front
Lusaka Central	Guy Scott	Patriotic Front
Mafinga	Catherine Namugala	Movement for Multi-Party Democracy
Magoye	Oliver Mulomba	United Party for National Development
Malambo	Maxwell Mwale	Movement for Multi-Party Democracy
Malole	Christopher Yaluma	Patriotic Front
Mambilima	Mighty Mumba	Patriotic Front
Mandevu	Jean Kapata	Patriotic Front
Mangango	Robert Taundi	Movement for Multi-Party Democracy
Mansa Central	Kennedy Sakeni	Patriotic Front
Mapatizya	Clive Miyanda	United Party for National Development
Masaiti	Micheal Zondani Katambo	Movement for Multi-Party Democracy
Matero	Miles Sampa	Patriotic Front
Mazabuka Central	Gary Nkombo	United Party for National Development
Mbabala	Ephraim Belemu	United Party for National Development
Mbala	Mwalimu Simfukwe	Movement for Multi-Party Democracy
Mfuwe	Mwimba Malama	Patriotic Front
Milanzi	Whiteson Banda	Movement for Multi-Party Democracy
Mitete	Misheck Mutelo	Movement for Multi-Party Democracy
Mkaika	David Phiri	Movement for Multi-Party Democracy
Mkushi North	Knorrasco Mutale	Movement for Multi-Party Democracy
Mkushi South	Sydney Chisanga	Movement for Multi-Party Democracy
Mongu Central	Nathaniel Mubukwanu	Patriotic Front
Monze	Jacob Mwiimbu	United Party for National Development
Moomba	Vitalis Mooya	United Party for National Development
Mpika Central	Mwansa Kapeya	Patriotic Front
Mpongwe	Gabriel Namulambe	Movement for Multi-Party Democracy
Mporokoso	Nevelyn Willombe	Patriotic Front
Mpulungu	Chomba Sikazwe	Patriotic Front
Msanzala	Joseph Lungu	Independent
Muchinga	George Kunda	Movement for Multi-Party Democracy
Mufulira	John Kufuna	Patriotic Front
Mufumbwe	Steven Masumba	Movement for Multi-Party Democracy
Mulobezi	Hastings Sililo	United Party for National Development
Mumbwa	Brian Chituwo	Movement for Multi-Party Democracy
Munali	Nkandu Luo	Patriotic Front
Mwandi	Michael Liwanga Kaingu	Movement for Multi-Party Democracy
Mwansabombwe	Rodgers Mwewa	Patriotic Front
Mwembeshi	Austin Milambo	United Party for National Development
Mwense	David Mabumba	Patriotic Front
Mwinilunga	Stephen Katuka	United Party for National Development
Nakonde	Abel Sichula	Patriotic Front
Nalikwanda	Geoffrey Lungwangwa	Movement for Multi-Party Democracy
Nalolo	Inonge Wina	Patriotic Front
Namwala	Moono Lubezhi	United Party for National Development
Nangoma	Boyd Hamusonde	United Party for National Development
Nchanga	Wylbur Simuusa	Patriotic Front
Nchelenge	Raymond Mpundu	Patriotic Front
Ndola Central	Fackson Shamenda	Patriotic Front
Nkana	Luxon Kazabu	Patriotic Front
Nyimba	Forrie Tembo	Movement for Multi-Party Democracy
Pambashe	Ronald Chitotela	Patriotic Front
Pemba	Mutinta Mazoka	United Party for National Development
Petauke Central	Dora Siliya	Movement for Multi-Party Democracy
Roan	Chishimba Kambwili	Patriotic Front
Rufunsa	Kenneth Chipungu	Movement for Multi-Party Democracy
Senanga	Likando Mufalali	United Party for National Development
Senga Hill	Kapembwa Simbao	Movement for Multi-Party Democracy
Serenje	Philip Kosamu	Patriotic Front
Sesheke	Sianga Siyauya	United Party for National Development
Shiwa Ng'andu	Stephen Kampyongo	Patriotic Front
Siavonga	Kennedy Hamudulu	United Party for National Development
Sikongo	Mundia Ndalamei	Movement for Multi-Party Democracy
Sinazongwe	Richwell Siamunene	United Party for National Development
Sinda	Levy Ngoma	Movement for Multi-Party Democracy
Sinjembela	Poniso Njeulu	United Party for National Development
Solwezi Central	Lucky Mulusu	Movement for Multi-Party Democracy
Solwezi East	Richard Taima	Movement for Multi-Party Democracy
Solwezi West	Humphrey Mwanza	Movement for Multi-Party Democracy
Vubwi	Eustarckio Kazonga	Movement for Multi-Party Democracy
Wusakile	Richard Musukwa	Patriotic Front
Zambezi East	Sarah Sayifwanda	Movement for Multi-Party Democracy
Zambezi West	Charles Kakoma	United Party for National Development

==== Replacements by by-election ====
Constituency	Original member	Party	By-election date	New member	Party
Chongwe	Japhen Mwakalombe	Movement for Multi-Party Democracy	28 November 2011	Sylvia Masebo	Patriotic Front
Magoye	Oliver Mulomba	United Party for National Development	28 November 2011	Oliver Mulomba	United Party for National Development
Nakonde	Abel Sichula	Patriotic Front	28 November 2011	Abel Sichula	Patriotic Front
Msanzala	Joseph Lungu	Independent	16 February 2012	Joseph Lungu	Patriotic Front
Malambo	Maxwell Mwale	Movement for Multi-Party Democracy	30 June 2015	Jacob Shuma	Patriotic Front
Chama North	Darious Mumba	Movement for Multi-Party Democracy	6 July 2012	January Zimba	Patriotic Front
Livingstone	Lukulo Katombora	Movement for Multi-Party Democracy	6 July 2012	Howard Sikwela	United Party for National Development
Muchinga	George Kunda	Movement for Multi-Party Democracy	6 July 2012	Howard Kunda	Movement for Multi-Party Democracy
Mufumbwe	Steven Masumba	Movement for Multi-Party Democracy	8 November 2012	Steven Masumba	Patriotic Front
Mpongwe	Gabriel Namulambe	Movement for Multi-Party Democracy	28 February 2013	Gabriel Namulambe	Patriotic Front
Livingstone	Lukulo Katombora	Movement for Multi-Party Democracy	14 March 2013	Evans Lawrence	Patriotic Front
Kapiri Mposhi	Lawrence Zimba	Movement for Multi-Party Democracy	23 April 2013	Eddie Musonda	Patriotic Front
Feira	Patrick Ngoma	Movement for Multi-Party Democracy	20 June 2013	Patrick Ngoma	Patriotic Front
Kafulafuta	James Chishiba	Movement for Multi-Party Democracy	25 July 2013	Brian Chitafu	United Party for National Development
Solwezi East	Richard Taima	Movement for Multi-Party Democracy	25 July 2013	Villie Lombanya	United Party for National Development
Mkushi North	Knorrasco Mutale	Movement for Multi-Party Democracy	1 September 2013	Ingrid Mphande	Patriotic Front
Mkaika	David Phiri	Movement for Multi-Party Democracy	5 September 2013	Peter Phiri	Movement for Multi-Party Democracy
Mansa Central	Kennedy Sakeni	Patriotic Front	22 November 2013	Chitalu Chilufya	Patriotic Front
Katuba	Patrick Mwewa	Movement for Multi-Party Democracy	25 February 2014	Jonas Shakafuswa	United Party for National Development
Mangango	Robert Taundi	Movement for Multi-Party Democracy	19 August 2014	Rogers Lingweshi	Patriotic Front
Kasenengwa	Victoria Kalima	Movement for Multi-Party Democracy	11 September 2014	Victoria Kalima	Movement for Multi-Party Democracy
Mkushi South	Sydney Chisanga	Movement for Multi-Party Democracy	11 September 2014	Davies Chisopa	Patriotic Front
Solwezi Central	Lucky Mulusu	Movement for Multi-Party Democracy	11 September 2014	Dawson Kafwaya	United Party for National Development
Vubwi	Eustarckio Kazonga	Movement for Multi-Party Democracy	11 September 2014	Margaret Miti	Patriotic Front
Zambezi West	Charles Kakoma	United Party for National Development	11 September 2014	Christabel Ngimbu	Patriotic Front
Chawama	Edgar Lungu	Patriotic Front	14 April 2015	Lawrence Sichalwe	Patriotic Front
Masaiti	Micheal Zondani Katambo	Movement for Multi-Party Democracy	14 April 2015	Micheal Zondani Katambo	Patriotic Front
Senga Hill	Kapembwa Simbao	Movement for Multi-Party Democracy	14 April 2015	Kapembwa Simbao	Patriotic Front
Bangweulu	Chifita Matafwali	Patriotic Front	8 June 2015	Anthony Kasandwe	Patriotic Front
Mulobezi	Hastings Sililo	United Party for National Development	1 July 2015	Patricia Mulasikwanda	Patriotic Front
Petauke Central	Dora Siliya	Movement for Multi-Party Democracy	1 July 2015	Dora Siliya	Patriotic Front
Lubansenshi	Patrick Mucheleka	Independent	24 September 2015	George Mwamba	Patriotic Front
Solwezi West	Humphrey Mwanza	Movement for Multi-Party Democracy	25 September 2015	Teddy Kasonso	United Party for National Development

=== Non-elected members ===
President Michael Sata originally nominated ten members instead of the eight allowed under the constitution, before dropping Wilie Nsanda and Samuel Mukupa the following day.

Type	Member	Party
Nominated	Alexander Chikwanda	Patriotic Front
Nominated	Panji Kaunda	Patriotic Front
Nominated	Joseph Kasonde	Patriotic Front
Nominated	Solomon Mbuzi	Patriotic Front
Nominated	John Phiri	Patriotic Front
Nominated	Robert Sichinga	Patriotic Front
Nominated	Ngosa Simbyakula	Patriotic Front
Nominated	Sebastian Zulu	Patriotic Front
Speaker	Patrick Matibini	Independent

==== Replacements ====
Original member	Party	Date	Type	Member	Party
		2 February 2015	Nominated	Mulenga Sata	Patriotic Front
Robert Sichinga	Patriotic Front	2 February 2015	Nominated	Margaret Mwanakatwe	Patriotic Front
Solomon Mbuzi	Patriotic Front	15 February 2012	Nominated	Charles Banda	Patriotic Front
		4 March 2015	Nominated	Christopher Mvunga	Patriotic Front
