= By-elections in Zambia =

Political elections for public offices in Zambia

By-elections are held in Zambia when seats of the National Assembly are vacated, or any elected public office becomes vacant.

== List ==
Date	Constituency	Province	Former MP	Former Party	Elected MP	Elected Party	Notes
1928	Northern	Central Province	Louis Gordon		Chad Norris		
1942	Ndola	Copperbelt Province	Frederick Roberts	Labour Party	Godfrey Pelletier		
1944	Ndola	Copperbelt Province	Godfrey Pelletier		Harold Williams		
1957	Nkana	Copperbelt Province	James Botha	Federal Party	Jerry Steyn	United Federal Party	
1961	Chingola	Copperbelt Province	William Gray Dunlop	United Federal Party	William Atkins	United Federal Party	
1964	Serenje	Central Province	Mateo Kakumbi	United National Independence Party	Miselo Kapika	United National Independence Party	
1964	Chingola	Copperbelt Province	Wilson Chakulya	United National Independence Party	Nephas Mulenga	United National Independence Party	
1964	Petauke	Eastern Province	Benjamin Anoya Zulu	United National Independence Party	Emmanuel Chirwa	United National Independence Party	
1970	Kalulushi	Copperbelt Province	Frank Chitambala	United National Independence Party	Alexander Chikwanda	United National Independence Party	
1971	Wusikili/Chamboli	Copperbelt Province	Simon Kapwepwe	United National Independence Party	Steven Malama	United National Independence Party	
1977	Roan	Copperbelt Province	Simfukwe Mulwanda	United National Independence Party	Musoka Chambeshi	United National Independence Party	
1979	Chingola	Copperbelt Province	Denny Kapandula	United National Independence Party	Denny Kapandula	United National Independence Party	
1979	Petauke	Eastern Province	Fanwell Chiwawa	United National Independence Party	Lavu Mulimba	United National Independence Party	
1984	Roan	Copperbelt Province	Leonard Mpundu	United National Independence Party	Moses Mwachindalo	United National Independence Party	
1985	Chasefu	Eastern Province	Raston Chirwa	United National Independence Party	Charles Nyirenda	United National Independence Party	
1986	Luanshya	Copperbelt Province	Raphael Chota	United National Independence Party	Dickson Kaliyangile	United National Independence Party	
1987	Chingola	Copperbelt Province	Denny Kapandula	United National Independence Party	Enoch Kavindele	United National Independence Party	
1992	Chadiza	Eastern Province	Shart Banda	United National Independence Party	Panji Kaunda	United National Independence Party	
1992	Nkana	Copperbelt Province	Barnabas Bungoni	Movement for Multi-Party Democracy	Matilda Chakulya	Movement for Multi-Party Democracy	
1993	Chasefu	Eastern Province	Stanley Phiri	United National Independence Party	Rhodwell Nyirenda	United National Independence Party	
1994	Mumbwa	Central Province	Makosonke Hlazo	Movement for Multi-Party Democracy	Donald Chivubwe	Movement for Multi-Party Democracy	
1994	Mufulira	Copperbelt Province	Fabian Kasonde	Movement for Multi-Party Democracy	Kaunda Lembalemba	Movement for Multi-Party Democracy	
1995	Chingola	Copperbelt Province	Ludwing Sondashi	Movement for Multi-Party Democracy	Enoch Kavindele	Movement for Multi-Party Democracy	
2001	Kabwata	Lusaka Province	Godfrey Miyanda (expelled from party)	Movement for Multi-Party Democracy	Richard Kachingwe	Forum for Democracy and Development	
2001	Msanzala	Eastern Province	Levison Mumba	Movement for Multi-Party Democracy	Peter Daka	Movement for Multi-Party Democracy	
2002	Bwacha	Central Province	Gladys Nyirongo (expelled from party)	Heritage Party	Gladys Nyirongo	Movement for Multi-Party Democracy	
2003	Kantanshi	Copperbelt Province	Danny Kombe	Movement for Multi-Party Democracy	Alex Manda	Patriotic Front	
2004	Kantanshi	Copperbelt Province	Alex Manda	Patriotic Front	Yamfwa Mukanga	Patriotic Front	
2008	Milanzi	Eastern Province	Chosani Njobvu	United Democratic Alliance	Reuben Banda	Movement for Multi-Party Democracy	
2008	Ndola Central	Copperbelt Province	Mark Mushili	Patriotic Front	Mark Mushili	Patriotic Front	
2009	Chitambo	Central Province	Nasim-ul Gani Hamir	Movement for Multi-Party Democracy	Solomon Musonda	Movement for Multi-Party Democracy	
2010	Chifubu	Copperbelt Province	Benson Bwalya (died)	Patriotic Front	Berina Kawandami	Patriotic Front	
2010	Milanzi	Eastern Province	Reuben Banda	Movement for Multi-Party Democracy	Whiteson Banda	Movement for Multi-Party Democracy	
2012	Muchinga	Central Province	George Kunda (died)	Movement for Multi-Party Democracy	Howard Kunda	Movement for Multi-Party Democracy	
2012	Msanzala	Eastern Province	Joseph Lungu	Independent	Joseph Lungu	Patriotic Front	
2013	Kafulafuta	Copperbelt Province	James Chishiba	Movement for Multi-Party Democracy	Brian Chitafu	United Party for National Development	
2013	Kapiri Mposhi	Central Province	Lawrence Zimba (election declared void at court)	Movement for Multi-Party Democracy	Eddie Musonda	Patriotic Front	
2013	Mkushi North	Central Province	Knorrasco Mutale	Movement for Multi-Party Democracy	Ingrid Mphande	Patriotic Front	
2013	Mpongwe	Copperbelt Province	Gabriel Namulambe	Movement for Multi-Party Democracy	Gabriel Namulambe	Patriotic Front	
2014	Kasenengwa	Eastern Province	Victoria Kalima	Movement for Multi-Party Democracy	Victoria Kalima	Movement for Multi-Party Democracy	
2014	Katuba	Central Province	Patrick Mwewa	Movement for Multi-Party Democracy	Jonas Shakafuswa	United Party for National Development	
2014	Mkushi South	Central Province	Sydney Chisanga	Movement for Multi-Party Democracy	Davies Chisopa	Patriotic Front	
2014	Vubwi	Eastern Province	Eustarckio Kazonga	Movement for Multi-Party Democracy	Margaret Miti	Patriotic Front	
2015	Malambo	Eastern Province	Maxwell Mwale	Movement for Multi-Party Democracy	Jacob Shuma	Patriotic Front	
2015	Masaiti	Copperbelt Province	Micheal Zondani Katambo	Movement for Multi-Party Democracy	Micheal Zondani Katambo	Patriotic Front	
2015	Petauke Central	Eastern Province	Dora Siliya	Movement for Multi-Party Democracy	Dora Siliya	Patriotic Front	
2018	Kasenengwa	Eastern Province	Victoria Kalima	Patriotic Front	Sensio Banda	Patriotic Front	
2019	Katuba	Central Province	Patricia Mwashingwele	United Party for National Development	Bampi Kapalasa	United Party for National Development	
2019	Roan	Copperbelt Province	Chishimba Kambwili	Patriotic Front	Joseph Chishala	National Democratic Congress	
2022	Kabushi	Copperbelt Province	Bowman Lusambo (election nullified)	Patriotic Front	Bernard Kanengo	United Party for National Development	
2022	Kabwata	Lusaka Province	Levy Mkandawire (died)	United Party for National Development	Andrew Tayengwa	United Party for National Development	
2022	Kwacha	Copperbelt Province	Joseph Malanji ( election nullified)	Patriotic Front	Charles Mulenga	United Party for National Development	
2024	Kawambwa	Luapula Province	Nickson Chilangwa	Patriotic Front	Nason Musonda	United Party for National Development	
2025	Pambashe	Luapula Province	Ronald Chitotela	Patriotic Front	Justin Kapema	United Party for National Development	
2025	Petauke Central	Eastern Province	Jay Emmanuel Banda	Independent	Simon Banda	New Congress Party	
2025	Mfuwe	Muchinga Province	Maureen Mabonga	Patriotic Front	Malama Mufunelo	United Party for National Development	
