= Lukashya =

Constituency of the National Assembly of Zambia

Lukashya is a constituency of the National Assembly of Zambia. It covers the southern part of Kasama and the towns of Bwacha, Chalula and Sopma in Kasama District of Northern Province.

== List of MPs ==
Election year	MP	Party
1973	Joel Kapilikisha	United National Independence Party
1978	Fabiano Kalimaposo	United National Independence Party
1983	Cosmas Masongo	United National Independence Party
1988	Cosmas Masongo	United National Independence Party
1991	John Mulwila	Movement for Multi-Party Democracy
1994 (by-election)	Bernard Mpundu	Movement for Multi-Party Democracy
1996	Bernard Mpundu	Movement for Multi-Party Democracy
2001	Augustine Mwape	Movement for Multi-Party Democracy
2006	Alfreda Mwamba	Patriotic Front
2011	Alfreda Mwamba	Patriotic Front
2016	Mwenya Munkonge	Independent
2021	George Chisanga	Patriotic Front
2026	Daniel Bwalya	National Reconciliation Party for Unity and Prosperity
