= Mandevu (constituency) =

Zambian National Assembly constituency

Mandevu is a constituency of the National Assembly of Zambia. It covers part of the northern section of Lusaka in Lusaka District, including the neighbourhoods of Mandevu, Garden Township, Chipata and Kabanana.

== List of MPs ==
Election year	MP	Party
1973	Dingiswayo Banda	United National Independence Party
1978	Dingiswayo Banda	United National Independence Party
1983	Ebrushy Phiri	United National Independence Party
1988	Pencil Phiri	United National Independence Party
1991	Rodger Chongwe	Movement for Multi-Party Democracy
1996	Nkandu Luo	Movement for Multi-Party Democracy
2001	Patricia Nawa	Forum for Democracy and Development
2006	Jean Kapata	Patriotic Front
2011	Jean Kapata	Patriotic Front
2016	Jean Kapata	Patriotic Front
2021	Christopher Shakafuswa	Patriotic Front
