= Kankoyo (constituency) =

Constituency of the National Assembly of Zambia

Kankoyo is a constituency of the National Assembly of Zambia. It covers Kankoyo and the rural area to the north-west of Mufulira in Mufulira District of Copperbelt Province.

== List of MPs ==
| Election year | MP | Party |
|---|---|---|
| 1973 | Joshua Mumpanshya | United National Independence Party |
| 1978 | Jack Kopolo | United National Independence Party |
| 1983 | Jack Kopolo | United National Independence Party |
| 1988 | Jack Kopolo | United National Independence Party |
| 1991 | Kangwa Nsuluka | Movement for Multi-Party Democracy |
| 1996 | Irene Chisala | Movement for Multi-Party Democracy |
| 2001 | Fidelis Chisala | Movement for Multi-Party Democracy |
| 2006 | Percy Chanda | Patriotic Front |
| 2011 | Levy Chabala | Patriotic Front |
| 2016 | Brian Mushimba | Patriotic Front |
| 2021 | Heartson Mabeta | United Party for National Development |
| 2026 | Edward Chomba | Independent |
