= Chimwemwe (constituency) =

National Assembly constituency in Zambia

Chimwemwe is a constituency of the National Assembly of Zambia. It covers Garneton and the Chimwemwe township of Kitwe in Kitwe District of Copperbelt Province.

== List of MPs ==
Election year	MP	Party
1973	James Banda	United National Independence Party
1978	Thomas Chiseng'antambu	United National Independence Party
1983	Julius Kabaso	United National Independence Party
1988	Julius Kabaso	United National Independence Party
1991	Henry Kristafor	Movement for Multi-Party Democracy
1996	Charles Museba	Movement for Multi-Party Democracy
2001	Willie Nsanda	Movement for Multi-Party Democracy
2006	Willie Nsanda	Patriotic Front
2011	Musenge Mwenya	Patriotic Front
2016	Elias Mwila	Independent
2021	Allen Banda	Patriotic Front
2026	Musenge Mwenya	National Reconciliation Party for Unity and Prosperity
