= Mwansabombwe (constituency) =

Constituency of the National Assembly of Zambia

Mwansabombwe is a constituency of the National Assembly of Zambia. It covers the towns of Kazembe and Lufubu in Mwansabombwe District of Luapula Province.

== List of MPs ==
Election year	MP	Party
1973	Peter Chanshi	United National Independence Party
1978	Edward Muonga	United National Independence Party
1983	Peter Chanshi	United National Independence Party
1988	Peter Chanshi	United National Independence Party
1991	Edward Muonga	Movement for Multi-Party Democracy
1993 (by-election)	Josiah Chishala	Movement for Multi-Party Democracy
1996	Josiah Chishala	Movement for Multi-Party Democracy
2001	Songobele Mungo	Movement for Multi-Party Democracy
2003 (by-election)	Maybin Mubanga	Movement for Multi-Party Democracy
2006	Samuel Chitonge	Patriotic Front
2008 (by-election)	Samuel Chitonge	Patriotic Front
2011	Rodgers Mwewa	Patriotic Front
2016	Rodgers Mwewa	Patriotic Front
2020 (by-election)	Kabaso Kampampi	Patriotic Front
2021	Kabaso Kampampi	Patriotic Front
2026	Kabaso Kampampi	National Reconciliation Party for Unity and Prosperity
