= Mbala Central =

Constituency of the National Assembly of Zambia

Mbala is a constituency of the National Assembly of Zambia. It covers the towns of Kawimbe, Lunzua and Mbala in Mbala District of Northern Province. Like the town of Mbala, it was originally known as Abercorn.

== List of MPs ==
Election year	MP	Party
Abercorn
1964	James Sinyangwe	United National Independence Party
1964 (by-election)	Rankin Sikasula	United National Independence Party
Seat abolished (split into Mbala North and Mbala South)
Mbala
1973	Edward Chitupi	United National Independence Party
1978	Ablam Chitala	United National Independence Party
1983	Ablam Chitala	United National Independence Party
1988	Lightwell Sibale	United National Independence Party
1991	Derick Chitala	Movement for Multi-Party Democracy
1996	Ronald Penza	Movement for Multi-Party Democracy
2001	Gaston Sichilima	Movement for Multi-Party Democracy
2006	Gaston Sichilima	Movement for Multi-Party Democracy
2011	Mwalimu Simfukwe	Movement for Multi-Party Democracy
2016	Mwalimu Simfukwe	Patriotic Front
2021	Njavwa Simutowe	United Party for National Development
Mbala Central
2026	Raphael Chilufya	National Reconciliation Party for Unity and Prosperity
