= Munali (constituency) =

Constituency in Lusaka, Zambia

Munali is a constituency of the National Assembly of Zambia. It covers the north-eastern section of Lusaka in Lusaka District, including the suburbs of Munali, Mtendere, Chainda, Avondale and Chelston.

== List of MPs ==
| Election year | MP | Party |
|---|---|---|
| 1973 | Mainza Chona | United National Independence Party |
| 1978 | Rupiah Banda | United National Independence Party |
| 1983 | Simeon Kampata | United National Independence Party |
| 1988 | Rupiah Banda | United National Independence Party |
| 1991 | Ronald Penza | Movement for Multi-Party Democracy |
| 1996 | Sonny Mulenga | Movement for Multi-Party Democracy |
| 2001 | Edith Nawakwi | Forum for Democracy and Development |
| 2006 | Chilufya Mumbi | Patriotic Front |
| 2011 | Nkandu Luo | Patriotic Front |
| 2016 | Nkandu Luo | Patriotic Front |
| 2021 | Mike Mposha | United Party for National Development |
| 2026 | Thomas Sipalo | United Party for National Development |
