= Malole (constituency) =

Constituency of the National Assembly of Zambia

Malole is a constituency of the National Assembly of Zambia. It covers the towns of Malole, Mashati, Mungwi and Munuka in Mungwi District of Northern Province.

== List of MPs ==
Election year	MP	Party
1973	Abel Mulanshoka	United National Independence Party
1978	Lawrence Pikiti	United National Independence Party
1983	Remie Chikonkolo	United National Independence Party
1988	Godfrey Kasoma	United National Independence Party
1991	Emmanuel Kasonde	Movement for Multi-Party Democracy
1993 (by-election)	Dismas Kalingeme	Movement for Multi-Party Democracy
1996	Dismas Kalingeme	Movement for Multi-Party Democracy
2001	Sebio Mukuka	Movement for Multi-Party Democracy
2006	Emmanuel Munaile	Independent
2011	Christopher Yaluma	Patriotic Front
2016	Christopher Yaluma	Patriotic Front
2021	Robert Kaela Kalimi	Patriotic Front
