= Zambezi East =

Zambian National Assembly constituency

Zambezi East is a constituency of the National Assembly of Zambia. It covers the eastern part of Zambezi and the towns of Chikomo, Chitongo, Kakeki, Muzaza, Nyakawanda and Samahamba in Zambezi District of North-Western Province.

== List of MPs ==
| Election year | MP | Party |
Balovale East
| 1968 | William Nkanza | United National Independence Party |
Zambezi East
| 1973 | William Nkanza | United National Independence Party |
| 1978 | Noah Dilamonu | United National Independence Party |
| 1983 | Noah Dilamonu | United National Independence Party |
| 1988 | Joseph Poho | United National Independence Party |
| 1991 | Paul Kapina | Movement for Multi-Party Democracy |
| 1996 | Paul Kapina | Movement for Multi-Party Democracy |
| 2001 | Maxwell Mukwakwa | United Party for National Development |
| 2006 | Sarah Sayifwanda | Movement for Multi-Party Democracy |
| 2011 | Sarah Sayifwanda | Movement for Multi-Party Democracy |
| 2016 | Brian Kambita | United Party for National Development |
| 2021 | Brian Kambita | United Party for National Development |
| 2026 | Jonathan Mundelema | Independent |
