= Petauke Central =

Constituency of the National Assembly of Zambia

Petauke Central is a constituency of the National Assembly of Zambia. It covers Chandema, Kawere Stores, Minga and Petauke in Petauke District of Eastern Province.

== List of MPs ==
Election year	MP	Party
Petauke
1964	Benjamin Anoya Zulu	United National Independence Party
1964 (by-election)	Emmanuel Chirwa	United National Independence Party
Petauke Central
1968	Justin Chimba	United National Independence Party
Petauke
1973	Fanuel Chiwawa	United National Independence Party
1978	Fanwell Chiwawa	United National Independence Party
1979 (by-election)	Lavu Mulimba	United National Independence Party
1983	Lavu Mulimba	United National Independence Party
1988	Lavu Mulimba	United National Independence Party
1991	Lavu Malimba	United National Independence Party
1996	Potiphar Mwanza	Movement for Multi-Party Democracy
2001	Ronald Banda	Heritage Party
2006	Dora Siliya	Movement for Multi-Party Democracy
Petauke Central
2011	Dora Siliya	Movement for Multi-Party Democracy
2015 (by-election)	Dora Siliya	Patriotic Front
2016	Dora Siliya	Patriotic Front
2021	Jay Emmanuel Banda	Independent
2025 (by-election)	Simon Banda	New Congress Party
2026	Pauline Banda	National Reconciliation Party for Unity and Prosperity
