= Nakonde (constituency) =

Constituency of the National Assembly of Zambia

Nakonde is a constituency of the National Assembly of Zambia. It covers the towns of Chipete, Chozi and Nakonde in Muchinga Province.

== List of MPs ==
Election year	MP	Party
1973	Arnold Simuchimba	United National Independence Party
1978	Arnold Simuchimba	United National Independence Party
1983	Arnold Simuchimba	United National Independence Party
1988	Arnold Simuchimba	United National Independence Party
1991	Edith Nawakwi	Movement for Multi-Party Democracy
1996	Edith Nawakwi	Movement for Multi-Party Democracy
2001	Clever Silavwe	Movement for Multi-Party Democracy
2006	Maka Silavwe	Movement for Multi-Party Democracy
2011	Abel Sichula	Patriotic Front
2011 (by-election)	Abel Sichula	Patriotic Front
2016	Yizukanji Siwanzi	Patriotic Front
2021	Luka Simumba	Patriotic Front
2026	Simon Simwanza	United Party for National Development
