= Chitambo (constituency) =

Constituency of the National Assembly of Zambia

Chitambo is a constituency of the National Assembly of Zambia. It covers Amoni Mukando, Cement Luanshika Kaliaba Shamboko, Kanchule Chisenga, Lasalo Mumba, Namilika Kawa, Musonda, Namutoya and Oka Kamwendo in Chitambo District of Central Province.

== List of MPs ==
Election year	MP	Party
1968	Pirie Kapika	United National Independence Party
1973	Justin Mukando	United National Independence Party
1978	Jeremiah Mukando	United National Independence Party
1983	Jeremiah Mukando	United National Independence Party
1988	Jeremiah Mukando	United National Independence Party
1991	Kapilya Lupiya	Movement for Multi-Party Democracy
1996	Donald Ngosa	Movement for Multi-Party Democracy
2001	Gunstone Chola	Movement for Multi-Party Democracy
2006	Nasim-ul Gani Hamir	Movement for Multi-Party Democracy
2009 (by-election)	Solomon Musonda	Movement for Multi-Party Democracy
2011	Mushili Malama	Movement for Multi-Party Democracy
2016	Remember Mutale	Patriotic Front
2021	Remember Mutale	Patriotic Front
2026	Nelson Kabanda	United Party for National Development
