= Wusakile (constituency) =

Constituency of the National Assembly of Zambia

Wusakile is a constituency of the National Assembly of Zambia. It covers the southern part of Kitwe and a rural area to the south of the city in Kitwe District of Copperbelt Province, including the neighbourhoods of Wusakili and Luangwa.

== List of MPs ==
Election year	MP	Party
Wusikili/Chamboli
1968	Simon Kapwepwe	United National Independence Party
1971 (by-election)	Steven Malama	United National Independence Party
Wusakile
1973	Steven Malama	United National Independence Party
1978	Dennis Katilungu	United National Independence Party
1983	Dennis Katilungu	United National Independence Party
1988	Maliya Chitumbi	United National Independence Party
1991	Chitalu Sampa	Movement for Multi-Party Democracy
1996	Chitalu Sampa	Movement for Multi-Party Democracy
2001	Stephen Mukuka	Movement for Multi-Party Democracy
2006	Barnabas Chella	Patriotic Front
2011	Richard Musukwa	Patriotic Front
2016	Pavyuma Kalobo	Independent
2021	Pavyuma Kalobo	Patriotic Front
2026	Pavyuma Kalobo	National Reconciliation Party for Unity and Prosperity
