= Luano (constituency) =

Constituency of the National Assembly of Zambia

Luano is a constituency of the National Assembly of Zambia. It covers the towns of Chafung, Chingobe and Mboroma in Luano District of Central Province. Prior to the 2026 election, it was known as Mkushi South.

== List of MPs ==
Election year	MP	Party
Mkushi South
1968	Richard Mboroma	United National Independence Party
Old Mkushi
1973	Francis Chembe	United National Independence Party
1978	Francis Chembe	United National Independence Party
Mkushi South
1983	Matildah Kolala	United National Independence Party
1988	Matilda Kolala	United National Independence Party
1991	Felix Machiko	Movement for Multi-Party Democracy
1996	Abel Chambeshi	Movement for Multi-Party Democracy
2001	Abel Chambeshi	Movement for Multi-Party Democracy
2006	Sydney Chisanga	Movement for Multi-Party Democracy
2011	Sydney Chisanga	Movement for Multi-Party Democracy
2014 (by-election)	Davies Chisopa	Patriotic Front
2016	Davies Chisopa	Patriotic Front
2021	Davies Chisopa	Patriotic Front
Luano
2026	Christopher Chibuye	United Party for National Development

== Election results ==
2014 by-election
Candidate	Party	Votes	%
Davies Chisopa	Patriotic Front	2,268	47.87
Sydney Chisanga	Movement for Multi-Party Democracy	1,458	30.77
Agnes Mambwe	United Party for National Development	1,012	21.36
Invalid/blank votes		58	–
Total		4,796	100
Registered voters/turnout		12,790	37.50
