= Chingola Central =

Constituency of the National Assembly of Zambia

Chingola Central is a constituency of the National Assembly of Zambia. It covers the central and southern parts of Chingola District in Copperbelt Province, including the southern part of the Chingola town centre and the areas of Kasompe, Lulamba, Mimbula, Musenga and Chikola.

The constituency was created in 1954 when the Mufulira–Chingola was split into two constituencies.

== List of MPs ==
Election year	MP	Party
Chingola
1954	William Gray Dunlop	Federal Party
1959	William Gray Dunlop	United Federal Party
1961 (by-election)	William Atkins	United Federal Party
1962	Samuel Magnus	United Federal Party
Chingola/Bancroft
1964	Wilson Chakulya	United National Independence Party
By-election	Nephas Mulenga	United National Independence Party
Chingola West
1968	Aaron Milner	United National Independence Party
Chingola
1973	Aaron Milner	United National Independence Party
1978	Denny Kapandula	United National Independence Party
1979 (by-election)	Denny Kapandula	United National Independence Party
1983	Denny Kapandula	United National Independence Party
1987 (by-election)	Enoch Kavindele	United National Independence Party
1988		United National Independence Party
1991	Ludwing Sondashi	Movement for Multi-Party Democracy
1995 (by-election)	Enoch Kavindele	Movement for Multi-Party Democracy
1996	Enoch Kavindele	Movement for Multi-Party Democracy
2001	Severine Chilufya	Movement for Multi-Party Democracy
2006	Joseph Katema	Patriotic Front
2011	Joseph Katema	Patriotic Front
2016	Mathew Nkhuwa	Patriotic Front
2021	Chipoka Mulenga	United Party for National Development
Chingola Central
2026	Michelle Phiri	National Reconciliation Party for Unity and Prosperity
