= Peter Daka =

Zambian politician

Member of the National Assembly for Msanzala
- In office 2003–2021
- Preceded by: Joseph Lungu
- Succeeded by: Elias Daka

Minister of Science, Technology and Vocational Training
- In office 2010–2011
- President: Rupiah Banda
- Preceded by: Brian Chituwo

Minister of Agriculture and Cooperatives
- In office 2009–2010
- President: Rupiah Banda
- Succeeded by: Eurstarcio Kazonga

Minister of Science, Technology and Vocational Training
- In office 2007–2009
- President: Levy Mwanawasa
- Preceded by: Brian Chituwo

Minister of Transport and Communications
- In office 2006–2007
- President: Levy Mwanawasa
- Preceded by: Abel Chambeshi
- Succeeded by: Sarah Sayifwanda

Member of the National Assembly for Msanzala
- In office 2003–2011
- Preceded by: Levison Mumba
- Succeeded by: Joseph Lungu

Personal details
- Born: 3 November 1960 (age 65)
- Party: MMD, PF
- Profession: Procurement specialist

Peter Marvin William Daka (born 3 November 1960) is a Zambian politician. He served as a Member of the National Assembly for Msanzala from 2003 to 2021.

== Biography ==
In the 2001 general elections, Daka contested the Msanzala seat as the Heritage Party candidate, finishing fourth with 21% of the vote, whilst Levison Mumba of the Movement for Multi-Party Democracy (MMD) was elected. However, the results were annulled by the High Court after being petitioned by Daka. Mumba was subsequently dropped by the MMD, with Daka chosen as the new MMD candidate. In the subsequent by-election, Daka defeated Mumba (who ran as the United Party for National Development candidate) and was elected to the National Assembly. During his first term in office he became a member of the Pan-African Parliament..In 2005 he was appointed Deputy Minister of Science and Technology by President Levy Mwanawasa.

Daka was re-elected in the 2006 general elections with a majority of 2,537. Following the elections he was appointed Minister of Transport and Communications. In 2007 he became Minister of Science, Technology and Vocational Training. He was moved to Minister of Agriculture and Cooperatives in 2009, before being reappointed Minister of Science, Technology and Vocational Training in 2010.

The 2011 general elections saw Daka lose his seat to Joseph Lungu, an independent candidate. After Lungu joined the Patriotic Front, Daka contested the subsequent by-election in 2012 but was defeated again.

Prior to the 2016 general elections, Daka was adopted as the Patriotic Front candidate. He was subsequently elected to the National Assembly with a 3,963 vote majority. Following the elections, losing candidate Margaret Zulu challenged Daka's election in court. However, the challenge was rejected.

Peter Daka is currently married to Priscilla Chikwama Daka. He has seven children: Monica Daka, Peter Daka Junior, Vanessa Daka, Russell Daka, Thangu Daka, Wesley Daka and Valerio Daka. He is a member of the Anglican Cathedral church.
