= Lubansenshi (constituency) =

Constituency of the National Assembly of Zambia

Lubansenshi is a constituency of the National Assembly of Zambia. It covers the eastern part of Luwingu District in Northern Province, including the town of Shimumbi.

== List of MPs ==
| Election year | MP | Party |
|---|---|---|
| 1983 | Albert Mukuka | United National Independence Party |
| By-election | Albert Chibulamano | United National Independence Party |
| 1988 | Eugine Mulenga | United National Independence Party |
| 1991 | Paul Chapuswike | Movement for Multi-Party Democracy |
| 1996 | Joackim Mwape | Movement for Multi-Party Democracy |
| 2001 | Andrew Mulenga | Movement for Multi-Party Democracy |
| 2006 | Lazarous Chota | Patriotic Front |
| 2011 | Patrick Mucheleka | Independent |
| 2015 (by-election) | George Mwamba | Patriotic Front |
| 2016 | George Mwamba | Patriotic Front |
| 2021 | Kabwe Taulo Chewe | Patriotic Front |
| 2026 | George Kingsley Mwamba | National Reconciliation Party for Unity and Prosperity |
