= Luapula (constituency) =

Constituency of the National Assembly of Zambia

Luapula is a constituency of the National Assembly of Zambia. It covers a rural area (Lunga District) in southern Luapula Province.

== List of MPs ==
Election year	MP	Party
1959	Samson Mununga	Independent
1962	Francis Stubbs	Northern Rhodesian African National Congress
Seat abolished (split into North Luapula and South Luapula)
1968	Sylvester Chisembele	United National Independence Party
Seat abolished
1983	Fabian Kaya	United National Independence Party
1985 (by-election)	Augustine Katotobwe	United National Independence Party
1988	Augustine Katotobwe	United National Independence Party
1991	Peter Machungwa	Movement for Multi-Party Democracy
1996	Peter Machungwa	Movement for Multi-Party Democracy
2001	Peter Machungwa	Movement for Multi-Party Democracy
2006	Peter Machungwa	Patriotic Front
2011	Emerine Kabanshi	Patriotic Front
2016	Emerine Kabanshi	Patriotic Front
2021	Chanda Katotobwe	Patriotic Front
2026	Beauty Kaya	United Party for National Development
