= Sarah Sayifwanda =

Zambian politician (1963–2020)

The Honorable Sarah Sayifwanda

Minister of Agriculture and Cooperatives
- In office 2006–2007
- President: Levy Mwanawasa

Minister of Transport and Communications
- In office 2007–2008
- President: Levy Mwanawasa

Minister of Gender and Development
- In office 2008–2011
- President: Rupiah Banda
- Preceded by: Patricia Mulasikwanda

Representative of the Zambian House to the Pan-African Parliament
- In office 2015–2020

Sarah Sayifwanda (8 July 1963 – 31 December 2020) was a Zambian politician who served as Minister of Gender and Development, Minister of Transport and Communication and Minister of Agriculture and Cooperatives. She was also the Zambian representative to the African Union and Pan-African Parliament.

== Early life and education ==
Sarah Sayifwanda was born on 16 January 1963, and was graduated with a Bachelor of Arts in special education.

== Political career ==
=== Mwanwasa Administration (2006 - 2008) ===
Sayifwanda served for Zambezi East in the National Assembly of Zambia as a member of the Movement for Multi-Party Democracy from 2006 to 2016. She was a backbencher in the legislature. Levy Mwanawasa appointed Sayifwanda as Minister of Agriculture and Cooperatives when he was elected. Mwanawasa created the Ministry of Gender and Women in Development in 2006. At the time, Patricia Mulasikwanda was appointed minister. In 2007 during a cabinet reshuffle, Sayifwanda was appointed as the Minister of Transport.

=== Banda Administration (2008 - 2011) ===
On 14 November 2008, Zambian President Rupiah Banda renamed the Ministry of Gender and Women in Development to the Ministry of Gender and Development, with Sayifwanda as minister. She held this role until 2011. While minister, Sayifwanda focused on decreasing the use of women to traffic drugs, promoting women's representation in politics, fighting marital violence, and providing support for people with intellectual disabilities.

=== Sata and Lungu Administration (2011 - 2020) ===
Sayifwanda was appointed as Gender Deputy Minister by Michael Sata of the Patriotic Front in 2011, but declined the role. In 2016, she defected from the Movement for Multiparty Democracy to the United Party for National Development with ten other MMD members of parliament.

In 2019, Zambian police arrested Sayifwanda for allegedly inciting a tribal fight between the Lundas and Luvales during an Electoral Commission of Zambia delimitation.

== Death and legacy ==
Sayifwanda died on 31 December 2020 at Solwezi General Hospital due to illness. She was granted an official state funeral and day of national mourning (5 January 2021) by President Edgar Lungu. She was laid to rest in Kimeteto Cemetery in Solwezi. Sayifwanda's service at United Church of Zambia Trinity Congregation was widely attended by politicians from both her party and the opposition. Some of the attendees included North-Western Province Minister Nathaniel Mubukwanu, UPND leader Hakainde Hichilema, and PF official Koshita Shengamo. She was a trustee of UPND.
