= Dora Siliya =

Zambian politician

Member of the National Assembly for Petauke Central
- In office 2006–2021
- Preceded by: Ronald Banda
- Succeeded by: Jay Emmanuel Banda

Minister of Information and Broadcasting Services
- In office February 2018 – August 2021
- President: Edgar Lungu
- Preceded by: Kampamba Mulenga
- Succeeded by: Chushi Kasanda

Minister of Agriculture
- In office 29 September 2016 – February 2018
- President: Edgar Lungu
- Preceded by: Given Lubinda
- Succeeded by: Micheal Zondani Katambo

Minister of Energy and Water Development
- In office October 2015 – August 2016
- President: Edgar Lungu
- Preceded by: Kampamba Mulenga
- Succeeded by: Chushi Kasanda

Minister Education
- In office June 2009 – September 2011
- President: Rupiah Banda
- Preceded by: Kampamba Mulenga
- Succeeded by: Chushi Kasanda

Minister of Transport, Works, Supply and Communication
- In office February 2008 – April 2009
- President: Levy Mwanawasa; Rupiah Banda
- Preceded by: Kampamba Mulenga
- Succeeded by: Chushi Kasanda

Deputy Minister of Commerce, Trade and Industry
- In office October 2006 – February 2008
- President: Levy Mwanawasa

Personal details
- Born: 8 October 1970 (age 55) Kitwe, Copperbelt Province, Zambia
- Party: Movement for Multi-Party Democracy (2001 - 2015); Patriotic Front (2015 - 2021)

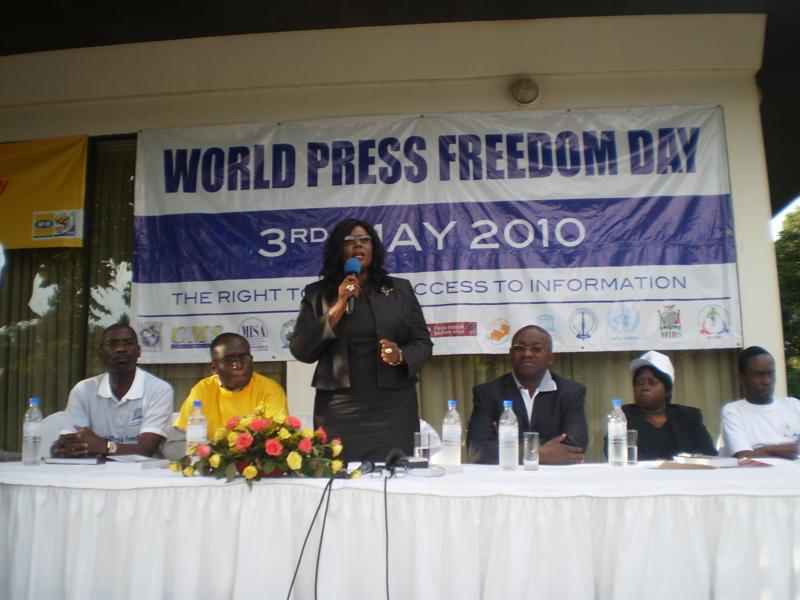
Siliya (standing) in 2010

Dora Siliya (born October 8, 1970) is a politician in Zambia. She was the member of parliament for Petauke Central from 2006 to 2021. During her political tenure, she served as the Deputy Minister of Commerce, Minister of Transport, Minister of Education, Minister of Energy and Water Development, Minister of Agriculture and Minister of Information and Broadcasting Services.

== Early years ==
She was born in Kitwe and went to school in Mufulira. After graduating at Kabulonga Girls secondary school in 1988, she commenced her studies at the University of Zambia where she studied medicine. After two years, she left the University and began working at Zambian Television and Radio (ZNBC), then went back to university to study mass communication, while still employed at ZNBC. In 1996 she started work at the South African Broadcasting Corporation. In 1997 she graduated with a Bachelor of Arts degree. She holds a master's degree in development economics from the University of Cambridge and PhD in Development Economics from University of Lusaka.

== Career ==
Siliya became the television controller at ZNBC. She left ZNBC and was employed in a European Union project of Private Sector Development for two years.

=== Political career ===
In 2001, she was approached by the Movement for Multi-Party Democracy (MMD) to run for the National Assembly, which she did in Petauke. She finished third out of six candidates and was then transferred to the Zambian embassy in Cairo working for the deputy ambassador and was mainly devoted to trade relations. In 2006, she stood again as the parliamentary candidate for the MMD in Petauke (resulting in her not continuing her embassy appointment in Cairo) and she won the seat.

She was appointed as the Deputy Minister of Commerce in the cabinet of President Levy Mwanawasa after the 2006 election. In February 2008, Mwanawasa appointed Siliya as the Minister of Transport, Works, Supply and Communication. In April 2009, after a tribunal found that Siliya had ignored the Attorney General's advice on a certain matter, she decided to resign from her role as transport and communication minister. In June 2009, President Rupiah Banda appointed her as the Minister of Education.

At the 2011 election, she stood again as the MMD candidate in Petauke Central and won the seat. However, in June 2013, her election victory was nullified by the Supreme Court of Zambia. The subsequent by-election only took place on 30 June 2015 after long legal disputes. In May 2015, Siliya had resigned from the MMD in order to join the Patriotic Front (PF) and so, she stood in the Petauke Central by-election on 30 June 2015 as the PF candidate and retained her seat. She was then appointed as the Minister of Energy and Water Development in October 2015 by President Edgar Lungu. At the 2016 election, she stood again as the PF candidate in Petauke Central and retained her seat. She was appointed as the Minister of Agriculture just after the 2016 election before being appointed the Minister of Information and Broadcasting Services and government spokesperson in February 2018.

At the 2021 general election, she stood again as the Patriotic Front candidate in Petauke Central and finished second to independent candidate Jay Emmanuel Banda.
