= Ministry of Local Government (Zambia) =

Government ministry of Zambia

The Ministry of Local Government and Rural Development is a ministry in Zambia. It is headed by the Minister of Local Government and Rural Development.

In 2012 the Environmental Protection portfolio was transferred to the Ministry of Natural Resources and Environmental Protection and the Early Education portfolio to the Ministry of Education, Science, Vocational Training and Early Education, with the department renamed the Ministry of Local Government and Housing.

In 2016 Housing was transferred from the local government portfolio to the Ministry of Housing and Infrastructure Development. In 2021, the Ministry of Local Government was renamed to the Ministry of Local Government and Rural Development.

== List of ministers ==
Minister	Party	Term start	Term end
Member for Health and Local Government
Ewain Wilson		1949	1953
Member for Health, Lands and Local Government
John Roberts	Federal Party	1954	1956
Member for Lands and Local Government
John Roberts	Federal Party	1956	1958
Minister of Local Government
Rodney Malcomson	United Federal Party	1959	1959
Minister of Local Government and Social Welfare
Rodney Malcomson	United Federal Party	1959	1961
H.L. Jones		1961	1962
Trevor Gardner		1962	1962
Kenneth Kaunda	United National Independence Party	1962	1964
Minister of Local Government
Nalumino Mundia	United National Independence Party	1964	
Sikota Wina	United National Independence Party	1964	1968
Minister of Local Government and Housing
Sylvia Masebo	Movement for Multi-Party Democracy	2003	2005
Sylvia Masebo	Movement for Multi-Party Democracy	2006	2008
Minister of Local Government, Housing, Early Education and Environmental Protection
Nkandu Luo	Patriotic Front	2011	2012
Minister of Local Government and Housing
Emerine Kabanshi	Patriotic Front	2012	2014
Emmanuel Chenda	Patriotic Front	2014	2015
John Phiri	Patriotic Front	2015	
Vincent Mwale	Patriotic Front	2016	2016
Minister of Local Government
Vincent Mwale	Patriotic Front	2016	2021
Minister of Local Government and Rural Development
Gary Nkombo	United Party for National Development	2021	2025
Gift Sialubalo	United Party for National Development	2025	2026

=== Deputy ministers ===
Deputy Minister	Party	Term start	Term end
Deputy Minister of Local Government and Housing
John Mwaimba	Movement for Multi-Party Democracy	2004	2006
Deputy Minister of Local Government, Housing, Early Education and Environmental Protection
Esther Banda	Patriotic Front	2011	2012
