= Christopher Bwalya Yaluma =

Zambian Politician

Member of the National Assembly for Malole
- In office September 2011 – August 2021
- Preceded by: Emmanuel Munaile
- Succeeded by: Robert Kalimi

Minister of Lands
- In office 30 September 2011 – 23 July 2012
- President: Michael Sata

Minister of Transport, Works, Supply and Communication
- In office 24 July 2012 – 21 May 2013
- President: Michael Sata
- Preceded by: Yamfwa Mukanga
- Succeeded by: Yamfwa Mukanga

Minister of Mines
- In office 22 May 2013 – 14 February 2018
- President: Michael Sata; Edgar Lungu
- Preceded by: Yamfwa Mukanga
- Succeeded by: Richard Musukwa

Minister of Commerce, Trade and Industry
- In office 15 February 2018 – May 2021
- President: Edgar Lungu
- Preceded by: Margaret Mwanakatwe
- Succeeded by: Chipoka Mulenga

Personal details
- Born: 31 May 1952 (age 74) Zambia
- Party: Patriotic Front
- Occupation: Politician

Christopher Bwalya Yaluma (born May 31, 1952) is a Zambian politician who served as the member of parliament for Malole Constituency from 2011 to 2021. During that time, he served as the Minister of Lands (October 2011 to July 2012), Minister of Transport (July 2012 to May 2013), Minister of Mines (May 2013 to February 2018) and Minister of Commerce, Trade and Industry (February 2018 to May 2021). He is a member of the Patrotic Front.

He has a Bachelor of Science and diploma in electrical engineering.

== Political career ==
Christopher Yaluma was elected as the member of parliament for Malole constituency in two consecutive elections (2011 and 2016) as the Patriotic Front candidate.

In the initial cabinet of President Michael Sata after the September 2011 election, Yaluma was appointed as the Minister of Lands, Energy and Water Development. On 24 July 2012, he was transferred to being the Minister of Transport, Works, Supply and Communication. On 22 May 2013, he was transferred to being the Minister of Mines, Energy and Water Development.

After Edgar Lungu was elected as Zambia's president in January 2015, the ministry was split into the Ministry of Mines and Minerals Development and the Ministry of Energy and Water Development, with Yaluma being appointed as the Minister of Mines and Minerals Development in February 2015. In February 2018, Yaluma was transferred to being the Minister of Commerce, Trade and Industry.
