= Msanzala =

Constituency of the National Assembly of Zambia

Msanzala is a constituency of the National Assembly of Zambia. It covers Chasya, Chimuka and Kasuwa in the Lusangazi District of Eastern Province.

== List of MPs ==
| Election year | MP | Party |
|---|---|---|
| 1983 | Clemens Mwanza | United National Independence Party |
| 1988 | Achitenji Mumba | United National Independence Party |
| 1991 | Levison Mumba | United National Independence Party |
| 1996 | Levison Mumba | Movement for Multi-Party Democracy |
| 2001 | Levison Mumba | Movement for Multi-Party Democracy |
| 2003 (by-election) | Peter Daka | Movement for Multi-Party Democracy |
| 2006 | Peter Daka | Movement for Multi-Party Democracy |
| 2011 | Joseph Lungu | Independent |
| 2012 (by-election) | Joseph Lungu | Patriotic Front |
| 2016 | Peter Daka | Patriotic Front |
| 2021 | Elias Daka | Patriotic Front |
| 2026 | Amon Mumba | Independent |
