= Nkandu Luo =

Zambian politician and scientist

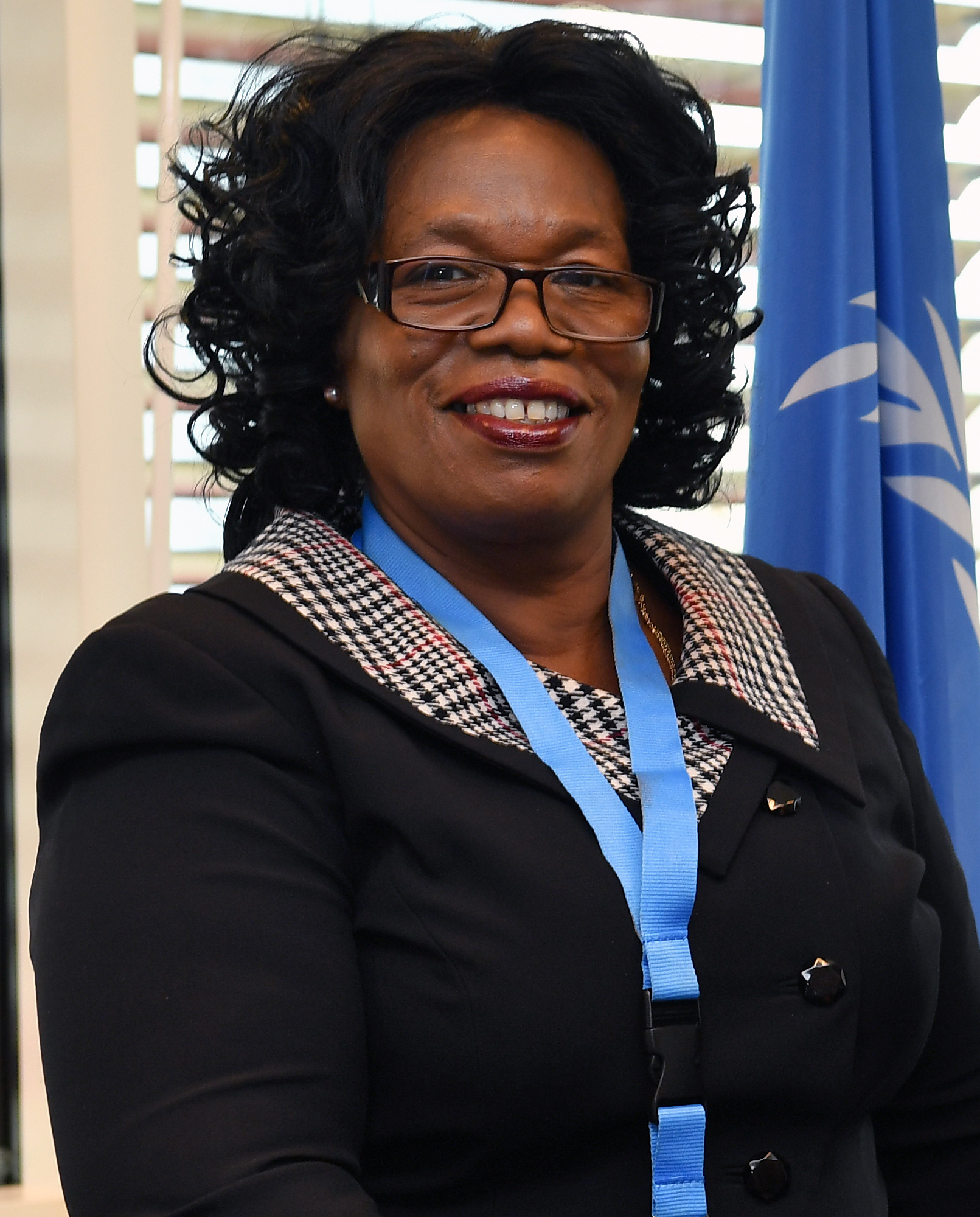
- Nkandu Luo in Vienna, Austria (2017)

Minister of Fisheries and Livestock
- In office July 2019 – May 2021
- President: Edgar Lungu
- Preceded by: Kampamba Mulenga
- Succeeded by: Makozo Chikote

Minister of Higher Education
- In office September 2016 – July 2019
- President: Edgar Lungu
- Preceded by: Michael Kaingu
- Succeeded by: Brian Mushimba

Minister of Gender and Child Development
- In office February 2015 – September 2016
- President: Edgar Lungu
- Preceded by: Inonge Wina
- Succeeded by: Victoria Kalima

Minister of Chiefs and Traditional Affairs
- In office July 2012 – February 2015
- President: Michael Sata
- Preceded by: Emerine Kabanshi
- Succeeded by: Joseph Katema

Minister of Local Government and Housing
- In office October 2011 – July 2012
- President: Michael Sata
- Preceded by: Brian Chituwo
- Succeeded by: Emerine Kabanshi

Minister of Transport and Communications
- In office 1999–2001
- President: Frederick Chiluba
- Preceded by: Dawson Lupunga
- Succeeded by: Lupando Mwape

Minister of Health
- In office February 1999 – December 1999
- President: Frederick Chiluba
- Preceded by: Katele Kalumba
- Succeeded by: David Mpamba

Elected member of the National Assembly
- In office November 1996 – December 2001
- Preceded by: Rodger Chongwe
- Succeeded by: Patricia Nawa
- Constituency: Mandevu
- In office September 2011 – August 2021
- Preceded by: Chilufya Mumbi
- Succeeded by: Mike Mposha
- Constituency: Munali

Personal details
- Born: 21 December 1951 (age 74) Chinsali, Zambia
- Party: Movement for Multi-Party Democracy (before 2011); Patriotic Front (2011-present)
- Education: Moscow State University; University of Brunei Darussalam
- Profession: Microbiologist

Nkandu Phoebe Luo (born 21 December 1951) is a Zambian microbiologist and politician who was a vice presidential candidate for the Patriotic Front in the August 2021 election. She is a microbiologist who previously served as Head of Pathology and Microbiology at the University Teaching Hospital in Lusaka and has carried out extensive research into HIV/AIDS.

== Early life and education ==
Luo was born at Lubwa Mission Hospital in Chinsali on 21 December 1951. Her parents were both teachers and Luo was one of the eight surviving children. She attended Roma Girls Secondary School and Dominican Convent. She has a MSc in microbiology from Moscow State University and a MSc and PhD in immunology from the University of Brunei Darussalam.

== Career ==
Luo worked at Saint Mary's Hospital in London. She became a professor in microbiology and immunology at the University of Zambia in 1993 and worked as Head of Pathology and Microbiology at the University Teaching Hospital, Lusaka, Zambia. She has published numerous journal articles on HIV/AIDS.

Luo was elected to parliament representing the Movement for Multi-Party Democracy in the Mandevu constituency in 1996. She served as Deputy Minister of Health from 1997 to 1999 and Health Minister in 1999, however she clashed with both donors and health workers and was moved from the post in November 1999 and replaced by David Mpamba. She was Minister of Transport and Communications from 1999 to 2001 before losing her seat in the 2001 election.

Luo created a network of thirty national AIDS advocacy groups and founded non-profit organisation Tasintha, which seeks to free Zambia from commercial sex-work and HIV/AIDS. She established the National AIDS Control program, the National Blood Transfusion Service and the Prevention of Mother to Child transmission of HIV/AIDS program.

Luo was elected as the Patriotic Front representative for Munali constituency in the September 2011 election. She was appointed as Minister of Local Government and Housing by Michael Sata, serving from October 2011 to July 2012, and then became Minister of Chiefs and Traditional Affairs from July 2012 to February 2015. Luo was sworn in as Minister of Gender by Edgar Lungu in February 2015. In March 2016, Luo was adopted as President of the Women Parliamentary caucus at the 134th Inter Parliamentary Union conference in Lusaka. She retained her Munali constituency seat at the August 2016 election and the following month, she became Zambia's Higher Education Minister. Luo was appointed as the Minister of Fisheries and Livestock in July 2019. On 20 October 2019, she threatened to cancel the memorandum of understanding with the Zambia Cooperative Federation (ZCF) for the construction of an agricultural industrial park in Chipata worth over $1 billion.

Luo was the running mate for President Lungu in the August 2021 election after Vice President Inonge Wina announced her decision to retire.

== Selected publications ==
- Elliott, Alison M; Luo, Nkandu; et al. (1990). "Impact of HIV on tuberculosis in Zambia: a cross sectional study". BMJ. 301 (6749): 412–415. doi:10.1136/bmj.301.6749.412. PMC 1663706. PMID 2282396.
- Conlon, Christopher P.; Luo, Nkandu; et al. (1990). "HIV-related enteropathy in Zambia: a clinical, microbiological, and histological study". The American Journal of Tropical Medicine and Hygiene. 42 (1): 83–88. doi:10.4269/ajtmh.1990.42.83. PMID 2301710.
- Luo, Nkandu (1993). "Socio-culture and Economic Dimensions of HIV/AIDS in Zambia". Positive Living Network. Lusaka.
- Elliott, Alison M.; Luo, Nkandu; et al. (1995). "The impact of human immunodeficiency virus on mortality of patients treated for tuberculosis in a cohort study in Zambia". Transactions of the Royal Society of Tropical Medicine and Hygiene. 89 (1): 78–82. doi:10.1016/0035-9203(95)90668-1. PMID 7747316.
- Peeters, Martine; Luo, Nkandu; et al. (1997). "Geographical distribution of HIV‐1 group O viruses in Africa". AIDS. 11 (4): 493–498. doi:10.1097/00002030-199704000-00013. PMID 9084797. S2CID 24238394.
