= Lusaka Central =

Constituency of the National Assembly of Zambia

Lusaka Central is a constituency of the National Assembly of Zambia. It covers the central and eastern parts of Lusaka in Lusaka District, including the neighbourhoods of Cathedral Hill, Rhodes Park, Longacres, Ridgeway, Woodlands, Kabulonga, Nyumba Yanga and New Kasama.

== List of MPs ==
Election year	MP	Party
Lusaka
1948	Ernest Sergeant	
1954	Ernest Sergeant	Federal Party
Lusaka Central
1959	Ernest Sergeant	United Federal Party
Seat abolished
Lusaka City Central
1968	Dingiswayo Banda	United National Independence Party
Seat abolished
Lusaka Central
1991	Dipak Patel	Movement for Multi-Party Democracy
1996	Dipak Patel	Independent
2001	Dipak Patel	Forum for Democracy and Development
2006	Guy Scott	Patriotic Front
2011	Guy Scott	Patriotic Front
2016	Margaret Mwanakatwe	Patriotic Front
2021	Mulambo Hamakuni Haimbe	United Party for National Development
2026	Msaiwale Mlewa	United Party for National Development

== Election results ==
=== 2011 ===
Candidate	Party	Votes	%
Guy Scott	Patriotic Front	19,974	62.36
Muhabi Lungu	Movement for Multi-Party Democracy	8,417	26.28
Charles Msiska	United Party for National Development	3,208	10.02
Cephas Chansa	National Restoration Party	253	0.79
Edwin Sakala	Zambia Direct Democracy Movement	177	0.55
Total		32,029	100.00
Valid votes		32,029	99.36
Invalid/blank votes		205	0.64
Total votes		32,234	100.00
Registered voters/turnout		60,099	53.63
Source: ECZ
