= Emerine Kabanshi =

Zambian politician and livestock specialist (born 1964)

Member of the National Assembly for Luapula
- In office September 2011 – August 2021
- President: Michael Sata; Edgar Lungu
- Preceded by: Peter Machungwa
- Succeeded by: Chanda Katotobwe

Deputy Minister of Gender
- In office November 2011 – March 2012
- President: Michael Sata
- Preceded by: Lucy Changwe
- Succeeded by: Esther Banda

Minister of Chiefs and Traditional Affairs
- In office March 2012 – July 2012
- President: Michael Sata
- Preceded by: Inonge Wina
- Succeeded by: Nkandu Luo

Minister of Local Government and Housing
- In office July 2012 – March 2014
- President: Michael Sata
- Preceded by: Nkandu Luo
- Succeeded by: Emmanuel Chenda

Minister of Community Development, Mother and Child Health
- In office March 2014 – September 2018
- President: Michael Sata; Edgar Lungu
- Preceded by: Joseph Katema
- Succeeded by: Olipa Phiri

Personal details
- Born: 27 November 1964 (age 61) Zambia
- Party: Patriotic Front
- Education: University of Lusaka

Emerine Kabanshi (born November 27, 1964) is a Zambian politician and livestock specialist. Kabanshi served as a member of the National Assembly of Zambia for Luapula from 2011 to 2021, and she was appointed to the cabinets of presidents Michael Sata and Edgar Lungu.

After facing allegations of mismanaging social welfare funds during her time as minister of community development and social welfare, Kabanshi was sentenced to two years in prison, which she served from 2023 to 2025.

== Early life and education ==
Emerine Kabanshi was born in 1964. She holds a certificate in animal nutrition and a diploma in animal production from an institution in Germany, and before entering politics she worked as an animal husbandry technologist. She has also pursued advanced studies in development at the University of Lusaka.

== Political career ==
In 2011, Kabanshi was elected to the National Assembly of Zambia as a Patriotic Front representative for Luapula. Later that year, she was appointed Deputy Minister of Gender by President Michael Sata. In March 2012, Sata promoted her to Minister of Chiefs and Traditional Affairs. Then, in July 2012, she became Minister of Local Government and Housing in a cabinet reshuffle.

In March 2014, in another Sata cabinet reshuffle, she was shifted to Minister of Community Development, Mother and Child Health. After Sata's death that October, she supported her party's candidate, Edgar Lungu, in the ensuing presidential by-election. On his election in early 2015, Lungu retained her as Minister of Community Development, Mother and Child Health.

Kabanshi was re-elected to her National Assembly seat in 2016. That year, she was appointed Minister of Community Development and Social Welfare, essentially retaining her previous portfolio. She held that position until 2018, when she was fired amid allegations of financial mismanagement that prompted a major foreign aid freeze.

She was arrested in May 2019 and in 2021 was convicted on two counts of willful failure to comply with the law over the incident, with a judge concluding she failed to follow appropriate procedures in the distribution of social welfare via a state-owned company, which led to beneficiaries not receiving the funds they were due. After the judgement was upheld by the High Court in 2023, she served her full sentence of 24 months in prison, despite requests from some party allies for her release on compassionate grounds after she suffered a stroke; she was released in January 2025.
