= Ministry of Higher Education (Zambia) =

Government ministry of Zambia

The Ministry of Skills and Higher Education is a ministry in Zambia. It oversees university and vocational, training, science, technology and innovation and is headed by the Minister of Skills and Higher Education.

The ministry was established in 2015 after being split from the Ministry of Education, which was renamed the Ministry of General Education. It had existed previously as the Ministry of Science, Technology and Vocational Training. Prior to that, there had been a Deputy Minister at the Ministry of Education responsible for technical education.

After the 2021 general election, the Ministry of Higher Education was merged with the Ministry of General Education, restoring a single Ministry of Education. After the 2026 general election, the ministry was once again split from the Ministry of Education, created as the Ministry of Skills and Higher Education.

== List of ministers ==
| Minister | Party | Term start | Term end |
Minister of Science, Technology and Vocational Training
| Gabriel Maka | Movement for Multiparty Democracy | 1993 | 1995 |
| Enoch Kavindele | Movement for Multiparty Democracy | 1996 | 1997 |
| Abel Chambeshi | Movement for Multiparty Democracy | 1999 | 2001 |
| Abel Chambeshi | Movement for Multiparty Democracy | 2002 | 2005 |
| Peter Daka | Movement for Multiparty Democracy | 2007 | 2009 |
| Peter Daka | Movement for Multiparty Democracy | 2010 | 2011 |
Minister of Higher Education
| Nkandu Luo | Patriotic Front | 2016 | 2019 |
| Brian Mushimba | Patriotic Front | 2019 | 2021 |
Minister of Skills and Higher Education
| Douglas Syakalima | United Party for National Development | 2021 | |

=== Deputy ministers ===
| Deputy Minister | Party | Term start | Term end |
Minister of State for Technical Education
| Charles Thornicroft | United National Independence Party | 1967 | 1968 |
