= Brian Mushimba =

Zambian politician

Brian C. Mushimba

Minister of Transport and Communications
- In office September 2016 – July 2019
- President: Edgar Lungu
- Preceded by: Kapembwa Simbao

Member of Parliament
- In office August 2016 – July 2021
- President: Edgar Lungu
- Constituency: Kankoyo

Minister of Higher Education
- In office July 2019 – July 2021
- President: Edgar Lungu
- Preceded by: Nkandu Luo

Personal details
- Born: 7 November 1974 (age 51) Mufulira, Zambia
- Party: Patriotic Front (2016-2021)
- Education: University of Arizona (BSc); Pittsburg State University (MSc); Salem University (MBA); University of Zambia (PhD)
- Profession: Engineer
- Website: brianmushimba.com

Brian C. Mushimba is a politician who was in Zambia's cabinet under President Edgar Lungu. He was born in Mufulira and was an engineer before entering parliament, representing Kankoyo Constituency in Mufulira District.

== Career ==
After graduating from the University of Arizona, Mushimba worked as an electrical controls engineer in Atlanta, Georgia, USA, and then in Zambia. After that he was Technical Director for Eskom, the state electricity utility of South Africa, and finally for a few months he was Regional Executive for the African market for the Norwegian power company SN Power, before he won a parliamentary seat from Kankoyo in the 2016 general election. He subsequently was appointed to the cabinet.
