= Humphrey Mwanza =

Zambian politician

Member of the National Assembly
- In office 2006 – 3 July 2015
- Succeeded by: Teddy Kasonso
- Constituency: Solwezi West

Personal details
- Born: 22 April 1949
- Died: 3 July 2015 (aged 66); Lusaka, Zambia
- Political party: Movement for Multi-Party Democracy

Humphrey Iddoh Mwanza (22 April 1949 – 3 July 2015) was a Zambian politician. He was a member of the National Assembly for the Solwezi West constituency for the Movement for Multi-Party Democracy since the 2006 elections. He was re-elected in the 2011 elections.

Mwanza died at age 66 after an operation to remove a stomach tumor in the University Teaching Hospital in Lusaka on 3 July 2015. Teddy Kasonso of the United Party for National Development was elected as Mwanza's successor in September 2015.
