= Ministry of Agriculture (Zambia) =

Government ministry of Zambia

The Ministry of Agriculture is a government ministry in Zambia. It is headed by the Minister of Agriculture and is mandated to design, implement and manage the government's activities in the agricultural sector.

The ministry managed agricultural, fisheries and livestock activities until 2015, when the departments of fisheries and livestock were merged to form the Ministry of Fisheries and Livestock.

== List of ministers ==
Minister	Party	Term start	Term end
Member for Agriculture and Natural Resources
Geoffrey Beckett			1953
William Harris Wroth	Federal Party	1954	1957
Harold Watmore	Federal Party	1957	1958
Ebden Carlisle	United Federal Party	1958	
Minister of African Agriculture
Edson Mwamba		1959	1962
Simon Kapwepwe	United National Independence Party	1962	1964
Minister of Agriculture
Elijah Mudenda	United National Independence Party	1964	
Minister of Agriculture, Food and Fisheries
Guy Scott	Movement for Multi-Party Democracy	1991	1993
Suresh Desai	Movement for Multi-Party Democracy		
Edith Nawakwi	Movement for Multi-Party Democracy		1998
Amusaa Mwanamwambwa	Movement for Multi-Party Democracy	1998	1998
Mundia Sikatana	Movement for Multi-Party Democracy	2002	2006
Minister of Agriculture and Cooperatives
Peter Daka	Movement for Multi-Party Democracy	2009	2010
Minister of Agriculture and Livestock
Emmanuel Chenda	Patriotic Front	2011	2013
Bob Sichinga	Patriotic Front	2013	2014
Wylbur Simuusa	Patriotic Front	2014	
Given Lubinda	Patriotic Front	2015	2015
Minister of Agriculture
Given Lubinda	Patriotic Front	2015	2016
Dora Siliya	Patriotic Front	2016	2018
Micheal Zondani Katambo	Patriotic Front	2018	2021
Reuben Mtolo Phiri	United Party for National Development	2021	2026
Moses Moyo	United Party for National Development	2026	

== Zambia Agricultural Research Institute ==
The Zambia Agricultural Research Institute (ZARI), which falls under the Ministry of Agriculture, is Zambia's largest agriculture research institute. It is mandated is to provide specialized research and advice to farmers and the government. ZARI is one of the principal research organizations studying grains in Zambia.
