= Jean Kapata =

Zambian politician

Member of the National Assembly of Zambia
- In office 2006–2021
- Preceded by: Patricia Nawa
- Succeeded by: Christopher Shakafuswa
- Constituency: Mandevu

Minister of Lands, Natural Resources and Environmental Protection
- Incumbent
- Assumed office 27 September 2016

Minister for Tourism and Arts
- Incumbent
- Assumed office 2014

Personal details
- Born: December 25, 1960 (age 65)
- Party: Patriotic Front

Jean Kapata (born 25 December 1960) is a Zambian politician and former Minister of Lands and Natural Resources.

== Career ==
Kapata worked as a theatre nurse before being elected to represent the Mandevu constituency at the 2006 election for the Patriotic Front. She was re-elected in 2011 and 2016.

On 2 October 2009, she was arrested with nine other Patriotic Front MPs after they protested the acquittal of former president Frederick Chiluba with car honks and whistles. They were released on 7 October.

In 2014, Kapata was appointed by President Michael Sata as Minister for Tourism and Arts. Under her tenure, the ban on big-game hunting cats in Zambia was lifted. In response to the international media attention surrounding the killing of Cecil the lion in neighbouring Zimbabwe, Kapata said, "the West seemed more concerned with the welfare of a lion in Zimbabwe than of Africans themselves."

Kapata was a member of the Zambia delegation to the United Nations 60th Session of the Commission on the Status of Women in March 2016. In the lead up to the August 2016 election Kapata received death threats and her driver was attacked by armed men demanding to know where she was. The MMD candidate for her constituency, Mary Phiri, accused Kapata of sending people to attack her campaign team. On 27 September 2016, she became Minister for Lands, Natural Resources and Environmental Protection. She was also the Patriotic Front's Chairperson for Elections.

== Personal life ==
Kapata is married and is a mother and grandmother. In 2013, First Lady Christine Kaseba officiated the wedding of Kapata's daughter.
