= Chingola West =

National Assembly constituency in Zambia

Chingola West is a constituency of the National Assembly of Zambia. It was created in 2026 by splitting Chingola constituency. It covers the western part of Chingola District, including the township of Chiwempala and the town of Kashamata.

== List of MPs ==
Election year	MP	Party
2026	Chipoka Mulenga	United Party for National Development
