= Davies Chisopa =

Zambian politician

Member of the National Assembly for Mkushi South
- In office 2014–2026
- Preceded by: Sydney Chisanga
- Succeeded by: Christopher Chibuye

Minister for Central Province
- In office 2015–2016
- President: Edgar Lungu
- Preceded by: Obvious Mwaliteta
- Succeeded by: Sydney Mushanga

Personal details
- Born: 23 June 1973 (age 53)
- Party: Patriotic Front

Davies Chisopa (born 23 June 1973) is a Zambian politician. He was the member of the National Assembly for Mkushi South from 2014 to 2026.

== Biography ==
Chisopa contested the 2011 general elections as the Patriotic Front candidate in Mkushi South, but was defeated by the incumbent MP, Sydney Chisanga of the Movement for Multi-Party Democracy, who received 61% of the vote. However, Chisopa contested the results at the Supreme Court, claiming there had been electoral malpractice. The Supreme Court annulled the results and a by-election was held on 11 September 2014, in which Chisopa was elected to the National Assembly with a majority of 810 votes. In February 2015 he was appointed Minister for Central Province.

Chisopa was re-elected in the 2016 general elections, defeating Chisanga by 97 votes. In October 2017 he became a member of the Committee on National Economy, Trade and Labour Matters and the Committee on Local Government Accounts. Chisopa was re-elected in the 2021 general election.
