= Mfuwe (constituency) =

Constituency of the National Assembly of Zambia

Mfuwe is a constituency of the National Assembly of Zambia. It covers the towns of Chikanda, Chikonde, Chimutanda, Kalonje, Lavushimanda, Mwaleshi and Nabwalya in Lavushimanda District of Muchinga Province.

== List of MPs ==
Election year	MP	Party
1991	Paul Lumbi	Movement for Multi-Party Democracy
1996	Charity Mwansa	Independent
2001	Nason Sambwa	Movement for Multi-Party Democracy
2006	Mwimba Malama	Patriotic Front
2011	Mwimba Malama	Patriotic Front
2016	Mwimba Malama	Patriotic Front
2021	Maureen Mabonga	Patriotic Front
2025 (by-election)	Malama Mufunelo	United Party for National Development
2026	Nicholas Mumbi	National Reconciliation Party for Unity and Prosperity
