= Kafulafuta (constituency) =

Zambian National Assembly constituency

Kafulafuta is a constituency of the National Assembly of Zambia. It covers the north-eastern part of Masaiti District in Copperbelt Province, including the towns of Chondwe, Mubanga and Walamba.

== List of MPs ==
Election year	MP	Party
1991	William Matutu	Movement for Multi-Party Democracy
1996	Dickson Matutu	Movement for Multi-Party Democracy
2001	George Mpombo	Movement for Multi-Party Democracy
2006	George Mpombo	Movement for Multi-Party Democracy
2011	James Chishiba	Movement for Multi-Party Democracy
2013 (by-election)	Brian Chitafu	United Party for National Development
2016	Joseph Kabamba	Patriotic Front
2021	Jeffrey Mulebwa	Independent
2026	Eleni Grigorakis	United Party for National Development
