= Ministry of Lands and Natural Resources (Zambia) =

Government ministry of Zambia

The Ministry of Lands and Natural Resources is a ministry in Zambia. It is headed by the Minister of Lands and Natural Resources.

In 2016 the Ministry of Lands, Natural Resources and Environmental Protection was split into the Ministry of Lands and Natural Resources and the Ministry of Water Development, Sanitation and Environmental Protection.

== List of ministers ==
Minister	Party	Term start	Term end
Minister of Land and Natural Resources
Ebden Carlisle	United Federal Party	1959	1961
John Moffat	Central Africa Party	1961	1962
Charles Cousins	Northern Rhodesian African National Congress	1962	1963
Minister of Lands
Abel Chambeshi	Movement for Multiparty Democracy	2001	2002
Minister of Lands and Natural Resources
Jean Kapata	Patriotic Front	2016	2021
Elijah Julaki Muchima	United Party for National Development	2021	2024
Sylvia Masebo	United Party for National Development	2024	2026

=== Deputy ministers ===
Deputy Minister	Party	Term start	Term end
Parliamentary Secretary for Land and Natural Resources
Job Michello	Northern Rhodesian African National Congress	1962	1963
