= Sydney Chisanga =

Zambian politician

Member of the National Assembly for Mkushi South
- In office 2006–2014
- Preceded by: Abel Chambeshi
- Succeeded by: Davies Chisopa

Minister for Central Province
- In office 2006–2007
- President: Levy Mwanawasa
- Succeeded by: Adamson Banda

Personal details
- Born: 3 October 1970 (age 55)
- Party: MMD, UPND
- Profession: Businessman

Sydney Chisanga (born 3 October 1970) is a Zambian politician. He served as member of the National Assembly for Mkushi South from 2006 until 2014.

== Biography ==
Chisanga contested the 2006 general elections as the Movement for Multi-Party Democracy (MMD) candidate in Mkushi South. He was elected to the National Assembly with a 3,778 majority. He was subsequently appointed Minister for Central Province. However, he was removed from his post by President Levy Mwanawasa in October 2007.

Chisanga was re-elected in the 2011 general elections with a 2,353 majority. However, losing candidate Davies Chisopa contested the results at the Supreme Court, claiming there had been electoral malpractice. The Supreme Court annulled the results and a by-election was held on 11 September 2014, in which Chisopa was elected to the National Assembly after defeating Chisanga by 810 votes.

Chisanga contested Mkushi South again in the 2016 general elections as the United Party for National Development candidate, losing to Chisopa by just 97 votes.
