= Abel Chambeshi =

Zambian politician

Minister of Transport and Communications
- In office 2005–2006
- President: Levy Mwanawasa
- Preceded by: Bates Namuyamba

Minister of Science, Technology and Vocational Training
- In office 2002–2005
- President: Levy Mwanawasa
- Succeeded by: Bates Namuyamba

Minister of Lands
- In office 2001–2002
- President: Frederick Chiluba; Levy Mwanawasa
- Preceded by: Samuel Miyanda

Minister of Science, Technology and Vocational Training
- In office 1999–2001
- President: Frederick Chiluba
- Preceded by: Alfeyo Hambayi
- Succeeded by: Valentine Kayope

Minister of Sport, Youth and Child Development
- In office 1999–1999
- President: Frederick Chiluba
- Succeeded by: Syacheye Madyenkuku

Minister for Central Province
- In office –1999

Member of the National Assembly for Mkushi South
- In office 1996–2006
- Preceded by: Felix Machiko
- Succeeded by: Sydney Chisanga

Personal details
- Born: 16 September 1944 (age 82)
- Party: Movement for Multi-Party Democracy
- Profession: Management consultant

Abel M. Chambeshi (born 16 September 1944) is a Zambian politician. He served as a Member of the National Assembly for Mkushi South from 1996 until 2006 and held several ministerial portfolios.

== Biography ==
Chambeshi contested the 1996 general elections as the Movement for Multi-Party Democracy (MMD) candidate in Mkushi South. He was elected to the National Assembly with a 1,562 majority. After being made Minister for Central Province, he was appointed Minister of Sport, Youth and Child Development in 1999. At the end of 1999 a cabinet reshuffle saw him become Minister of Science, Technology and Vocational Training. In February 2001 he was appointed Minister of Lands.

Chambeshi was re-elected in the December 2001 general elections with a reduced majority of 317. In January 2002 he returned to his previous portfolio, becoming Minister of Science, Technology and Vocational Training again. In January 2005 he was appointed Minister of Transport and Communications.

Chambeshi did not contest the 2006 general elections.
