= Ministry of Transport and Logistics (Zambia) =

Government ministry of Zambia

The Ministry of Transport and Logistics is a ministry in Zambia. It is headed by the Minister of Transport and Logistics.

In 2011 the ministry was merged with the Ministry of Works and Supply to form the Ministry of Transport, Works, Supply and Communication. The merger was reversed in 2015. In 2021, the Ministry of Transport and Communications was renamed as the Ministry of Transport and Logistics.

== List of ministers ==
Minister	Party	Term start	Term end
Minister of Transport and Works
William Gray Dunlop	United Federal Party	1959	1961
Harry Franklin	Central Africa Party	1961	1962
Francis Stubbs	Northern Rhodesian African National Congress	1962	
Minister of Transport and Communications
Reuben Kamanga	United National Independence Party	1964	
Minister of Power, Transport and Works
Fwanyanga Mulikita	United National Independence Party	1971	1973
Minister of Transport and Communications
Andrew Kashita	Movement for Multi-Party Democracy	1991	1994
Nkandu Luo	Movement for Multi-Party Democracy	1999	2001
Abel Chambeshi	Movement for Multi-Party Democracy	2005	2006
Peter Daka	Movement for Multi-Party Democracy	2006	2007
Minister of Transport, Works, Supply and Communication
Yamfwa Mukanga	Patriotic Front	2011	2012
Christopher Yaluma	Patriotic Front	2012	2013
Yamfwa Mukanga	Patriotic Front	2013	2015
Minister of Transport and Communications
Kapembwa Simbao	Patriotic Front	2015	2016
Brian Mushimba	Patriotic Front	2016	2019
Mutotwe Kafwaya	Patriotic Front	2019	2021
Minister of Transport and Logistics
Frank Tayali	United Party for National Development	2021	2026

=== Deputy ministers ===
Deputy Minister	Party	Term start	Term end
Deputy Minister of Transport, Works, Supply and Communication
James Kapyanga	Patriotic Front	2015	2015
Deputy Minister of Transport and Communications
James Kapyanga	Patriotic Front	2015	2016
