= Chimwemwe =

Chimwemwe may refer to:

- Chimwemwe (constituency), a constituency of the National Assembly of Zambia

== Given name ==
- Chimwemwe Chihana-Mtawali, Zambian musician
- Chimwemwe Chipungu, Malawian politician
- Chimwemwe Idana, Malawian footballer
- Chimwemwe Madise, Malawian footballer
- Chimwemwe Undi, Canadian poet

== Surname ==
- Takudzwa Chimwemwe, Zimbabwean footballer
