= Inonge Wina =

Zambian politician

Inonge Mutukwa Wina
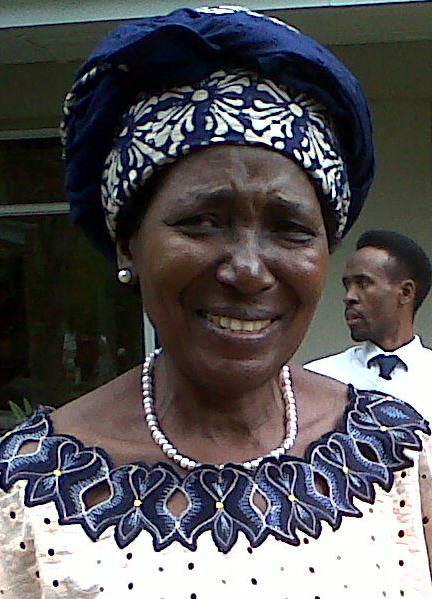
- Wina in 2012

13th Vice President of Zambia
- In office 26 January 2015 – 24 August 2021
- President: Edgar Lungu
- Preceded by: Guy Scott
- Succeeded by: Mutale Nalumango

Minister of Gender and Child Development
- In office 8 March 2012 – 25 January 2015
- President: Michael Sata; Guy Scott (Acting)
- Preceded by: Office created
- Succeeded by: Nkandu Luo

Minister of Chiefs and Traditional Affairs
- In office 29 September 2011 – 8 March 2012
- President: Michael Sata
- Preceded by: Office created
- Succeeded by: Emerine Kabanshi

Member of the National Assembly for Nalolo
- In office 27 December 2001 – 27 September 2006
- Preceded by: Mubita Mwangala
- Succeeded by: Mubita Mwangala
- In office 20 September 2011 – 10 September 2016
- Preceded by: Mubita Mwangala
- Succeeded by: George Imbuwa

Personal details
- Born: 2 April 1941 (age 85) Senanga, Northern Rhodesia
- Party: UPND (2001 - 2006) ULP (2006 - 2007) PF (2007 - 2021)
- Spouse: Arthur Wina (d. 1995)
- Children: 3
- Education: Santa Monica College (Dip.); University of Zambia (BA)
- Profession: Social worker, politician

Inonge Mutukwa Wina (born 2 April 1941) is a Zambian politician who served as the 13th Vice President from 2015 to 2021. She was the first woman to hold the position, which made her the highest ranking woman in the history of the Zambian government.

== Education ==
Wina attended primary school in Senanga and the Barotse National School (now Kambule Secondary School) in Mongu. She eventually completed her high school education at Santa Monica High School in Los Angeles, California. She obtained a diploma in social work at Santa Monica College. She also enrolled for a Bachelor of Arts degree at the University of Zambia when it was first opened.

== Community service ==
Wina's involvement in community work dates back to the early 1970s when she volunteered free service to women's movements. She has served on various boards of non-governmental organisations. She was also president of the Young Women's Christian Association, where she was instrumental in promoting women's human rights agenda, resulting in the Zambian government's establishment of the Victim Support Unit under the Zambia Police Service. In 1996, she was elected National Chairperson of the NGO Coordinating Council of Zambia (NGOCC).

In the Red Ribbon Campaign to defend the Zambian Constitution in 2000, Wina led the women's movement. Wina also served on the boards of Refuge Services Zambia, the Zambia Council of Social Services, the University Teaching Hospital, and the University of Zambia Council in the public sector.

== Political career ==
In 2001 Wina was elected as Member of Parliament of Nalolo Constituency as a candidate of the United Party for National Development.

Wina re-contested her Nalolo seat as a United Liberal Party candidate in the 2006 general election. She lost the election and appealed the results to the High Court; the case was initially decided in her favor, but the Supreme Court eventually overturned it. She then joined the Patriotic Front and was appointed the party's chairperson in 2007.

Wina ran for the Nalolo seat again in the 2011 general election, this time on the Patriotic Front ticket, and won. Wina was included in President Michael Sata's initial 18-member cabinet as Minister of Chiefs and Traditional Affairs. On March 8, 2012, Sata, during the commemoration of International Women's Day, upgraded the gender cabinet division into a full ministry and subsequently appointed Wina as Minister of Gender and Child Development.

On 26 January 2015, newly elected President Edgar Lungu appointed Wina as Vice President of Zambia. She ran on Lungu's ticket in the 2016 general election, becoming the first woman elected as Vice President. She then announced her intention to retire ahead of the 2021 general election.

== Personal life ==
She was married to Arthur Wina, an independence fighter, former minister and academic who died on 3 September 1995. They had three children, two of whom are deceased. Arthur Wina was educated at Munali Secondary School which, in colonial times, was Zambia's principal secondary school for native Zambians. A number of the members of Zambia's first post-Independence cabinet, (including Arthur Wina's brother Sikota), were also educated at Munali.

Political offices
Preceded by Guy Scott	Vice-President of Zambia; 2015–2021	Succeeded by Mutale Nalumango
