= Zambians for Empowerment and Development =

Political party in Zambia

- Leader: Fred Mutesa
- Founded: June 2009
- Ideology: Anti-communism; Social democracy

Zambians for Empowerment and Development is a political party in Zambia.

== History ==
The party was established by University of Zambia lecturer Fred Mutesa in June 2009; it was registered on 9 June and was officially launched on 23 June.

Mutesa was the party's presidential candidate in the 2011 general elections, finishing last in a field of 10 candidates with 0.08% of the vote. In the National Assembly elections it received 0.11% of the vote, failing to win a seat. The party did not contest the 2015 presidential by-election.
