= Willah Mudolo =

Zambian businessman and political figure

Willah Joseph Mudolo
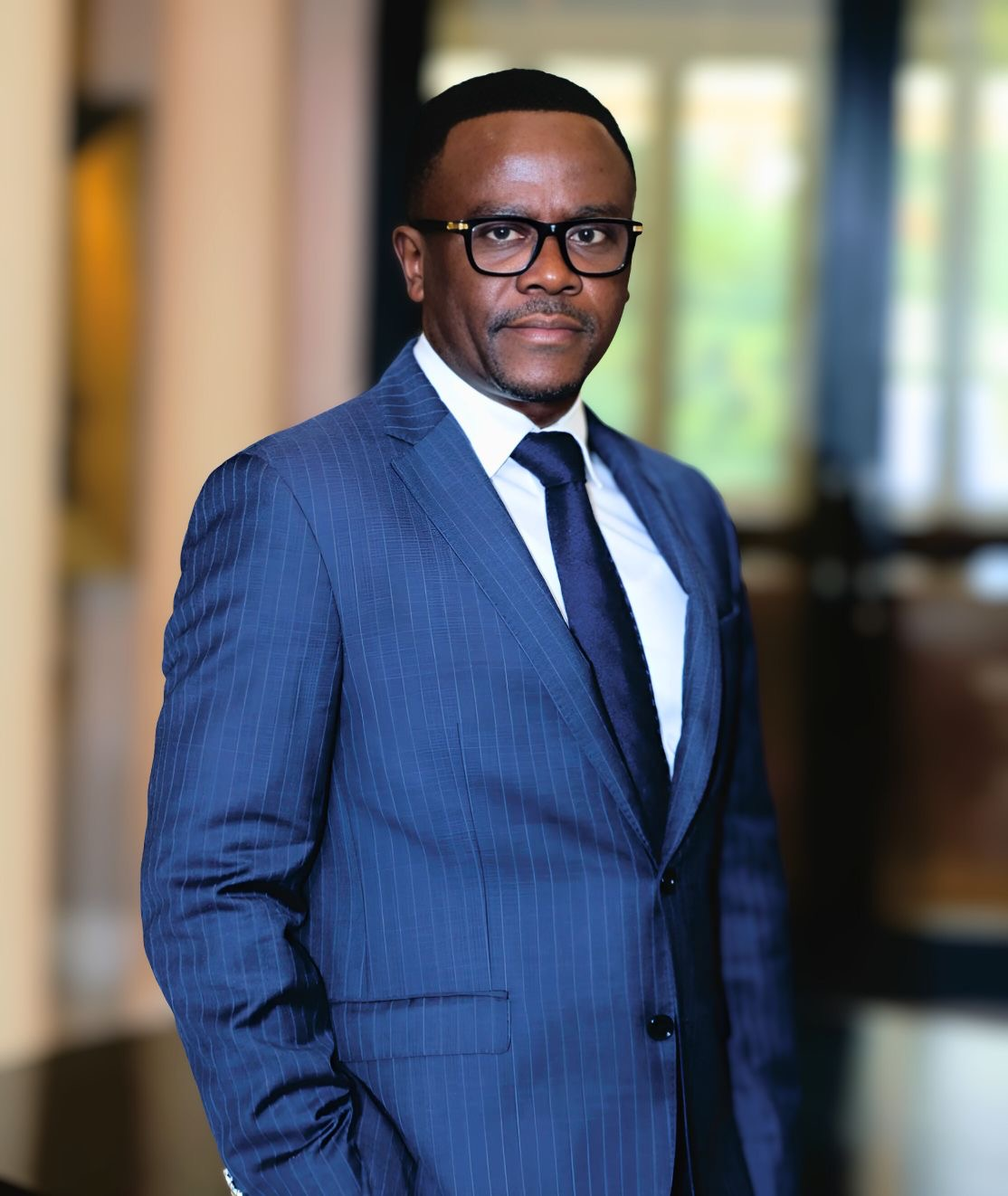

Personal details
- Born: 25 August 1980 (age 45) Mufulira, Zambia
- Party: Patriotic Front
- Spouse: Zethu Mudolo
- Children: 3
- Education: Heriot-Watt University, Edinburgh Business School
- Website: https://wjmudolo.com

Willah Joseph Mudolo (born August 25, 1980) is a Zambian businessman, philanthropist, and political figure. He has been associated with ventures in mining, agriculture, and real estate. He is a member of the Patriotic Front (PF), a political party in Zambia.

== Early life and education ==
Mudolo was born in Mufulira, Zambia. His father worked at Konkola Copper Mines (KCM) prior to privatisation, and his mother was a grocery store clerk. He began his formal education at Nsami Primary School in 1988, followed by Mulekatembo Secondary School and Isoka Boys Secondary School in Zambia. After secondary school, he obtained an Association of Accounting Technicians (AAT) qualification in the United Kingdom through NIEC Business School. He holds an MBA in Finance and Sustainability from the University of Cumbria, an MBA from Heriot-Watt University's Edinburgh Business School, and an MSc in Finance and Accounting from the University of Salford. He has also completed executive education in private equity at London Business School and earned an Executive Diploma in Advanced Research from Robert Kennedy College in Switzerland.

== Career ==
Mudolo co-founded the African Development Funding (ADF) Group, where he serves as President of Global Operations and is associated with The Mauritius Energy Fund. In the mid-2000s, Mudolo was a member of the Patriotic Front while primarily focused on business activities. Mudolo still maintains his Patriotic Front membership. In 2020, he founded the National Economic Transformation Party (NETP), which is promoting an economic reform agenda.

Mudolo is an Honorary Ambassador to the Pan-African Parliament for Energy and Humanitarian Advancement,. He provides advisory services to private sector entities and governments. On 28 August 2025, he announced plans to run for the Patriotic Front presidency ahead of the 2026 Zambian general election.

== Relationship with the Pan-African Parliament and the African Union ==
Mudolo is reported to serve as an Honorary Ambassador of the Pan-African Parliament, with a focus on energy infrastructure and development initiatives. He also serves as Patron of the Circle of Advisors for the AfroChampions Initiative, to promote the growth of African multinational corporations and regional economic integration, including (AfCFTA), an initiative of the African Union.

== Philanthropy ==
Mudolo established the WJ Mudolo Foundation, which supports development and community empowerment projects in Zambia and other African countries. The foundation's initiatives focus on health, education, and poverty alleviation.

== Legal issues ==
Mudolo has been a co-accused in a case in South Africa alongside pastor Shepherd Bushiri and his wife, relating to allegations of fraud and money laundering. He has denied wrongdoing. In December 2024, he lodged complaints against members of the prosecution, alleging misconduct and perjury during the proceedings.
