= Kankoyo =

Coordinates: 12.532369°S 28.222242°E

- Interactive map of Kankoyo
- Location in Zambia
- Province: Copperbelt Province
- District: Mufulira District
- Main Place: Mufulira

Kankoyo is a township in Mufulira District of Copperbelt Province in Zambia. The settlement is located next to the Mufulira copper mine and is heavily polluted by sulphur dioxide emissions from the mine. It is located in a constituency of the same name.
