= Chipoka Mulenga =

Zambian politician

Minister of Commerce, Trade and Industry
- In office September 2021 – May 2026
- Preceded by: Christopher Bwalya Yaluma

Member of the National Assembly for Chingola
- In office August 2021 – May 2026
- Preceded by: Mathew Nkhuwa
- Succeeded by: Seat abolished

Member of the National Assembly for Chingola West
- Incumbent
- Assumed office August 2026
- Preceded by: Seat created

Personal details
- Born: 10 November 1981 (age 44) Mufulira, Zambia
- Party: United Party for National Development
- Occupation: Politician

Chipoka Mulenga is a Zambian politician who is currently the member of parliament for Chingola West. He was the Minister of Commerce, Trade and Industry and the member of parliament for Chingola from 2021 to 2026. He is a member of the United Party for National Development (UPND). He was born on 10 November 1981 in Zambia. He holds an MBA in Project Management, a Bachelor of Commerce in Entrepreneurship and a diploma in surveying.

== Political Career ==
Chipoka Mulenga stood as the United Party for National Development candidate for parliament in Chingola constituency at the 2021 general election in August 2021 and he was elected. The following month, he was appointed as the Minister of Commerce, Trade and Industry by president Hakainde Hichilema.

Ahead of the 2026 general election, Chingola constituency was split into two constituencies, namely Chingola Central and Chingola West. Mulenga was adopted to be the UPND candidate in Chingola West for the election that took place on 13 August 2026 and he was elected.
