= Margaret Mwanakatwe =

Zambian accountant, bank executive and politician

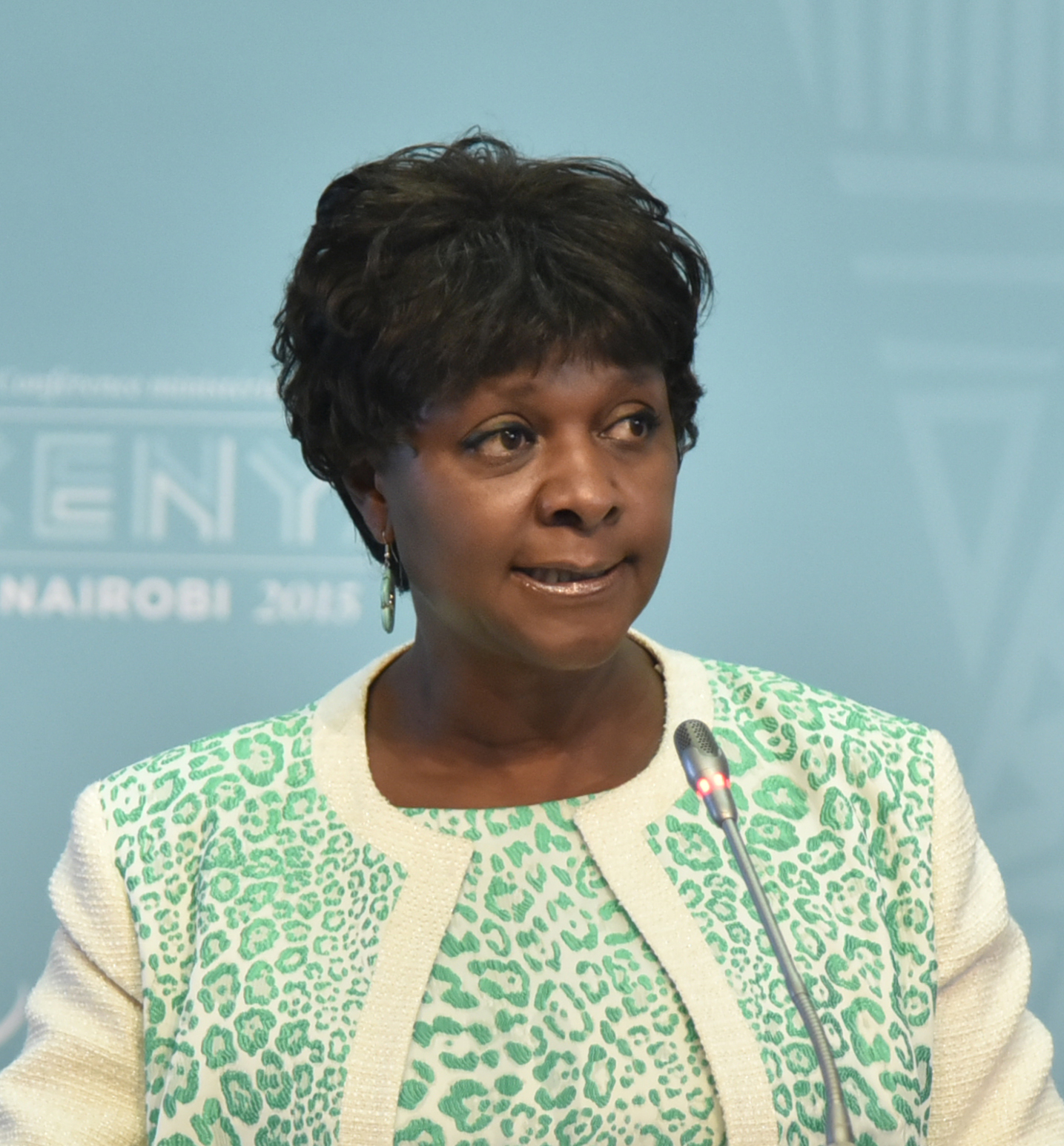

Minister of Finance
- In office 14 February 2018 – 14 July 2019
- President: Edgar Lungu
- Preceded by: Felix Mutati
- Succeeded by: Bwalya Ng'andu

Minister of Commerce, Trade and Industry
- In office 2 February 2015 – 14 February 2018
- President: Edgar Lungu
- Preceded by: Robert Sichinga
- Succeeded by: Christopher Yaluma

Member of Parliament for Lusaka Central
- In office August 2016 – August 2021
- Preceded by: Guy Scott
- Succeeded by: Mulambo Haimbe

Managing Director of United Bank for Africa
- In office March 2009 – May 2011
- Preceded by: Post established
- Succeeded by: Frans Ojielu

Managing Director of Barclays Bank of Ghana PLC
- In office 2004–2009
- Preceded by: Kobina Quansah
- Succeeded by: Ernest Debrah

Managing Director of Barclays Bank of Zambia
- In office 2001–2008
- Preceded by: Ian Knapman

Personal details
- Born: 1 November 1961 (age 64) Northern Rhodesia
- Spouse: Mupanga Mwanakatwe
- Education: Association of Chartered Certified Accountants (Chartered Certified Accountant)
- Alma mater: University of Zambia (Bachelor of Business Administration)
- Profession: Senior bank executive
- Known for: Business, management

Margaret Mhango Mwanakatwe is a Zambian politician who was the Minister of Finance from 14 February 2018 to 14 July 2019. She worked previously as a businesswoman, accountant, and bank executive. She was the director for business development in Anglophone Africa at the United Bank for Africa at the bank's headquarters in Lagos, Nigeria. In this role, she supervised business development in Cameroon, the Democratic Republic of the Congo, Ghana, Kenya, Liberia, Mozambique, Tanzania, Uganda, and Zambia. Before that, she served as the managing director and chief executive officer of the United Bank for Africa Uganda Limited from March 2009 until May 2011.

== Overview ==
Margaret is a business executive and banker, with a professional career spanning over twenty years. She has been a banking chief executive in her native Zambia, Ghana, and Uganda and a senior executive at the United Bank for Africa (UBA) in Nigeria.

== Background and education ==
She was born in Northern Rhodesia on 1 November 1961. She holds a Bachelor of Business Administration degree. She is also a Chartered Certified Accountant, recognized by the Association of Chartered Certified Accountants of London.

== Career ==
Following education both in Zambia and abroad, she took up employment at Barclays Bank of Zambia (now Absa Bank Zambia Plc). She rose to the position of managing director. She was the first Zambian and first female chief executive at Barclays Bank of Zambia. She was also the first woman CEO in all of Barclays Bank's African subsidiaries at the time. In 2004, she was appointed as the managing director and CEO at Barclays Bank of Ghana, serving in that capacity until 2009.

In 2009, she left Barclays Bank and joined the UBA as managing director and chief executive at UBA Bank Uganda. During the same timeframe, she served as the regional business director for southern Africa for UBA. In 2011, she left UBA Uganda and transferred to the headquarters of UBA in Lagos, Nigeria as the director for business development in Anglophone Africa.

== Politics ==
On 2 February 2015, Mwanakatwe was nominated Member of Parliament and appointed Ministry of Commerce, Trade and Industry by Zambian President Edgar Lungu. At the 2016 general election, she was elected as Member of Parliament for Lusaka Central Constituency, which was previously held by Guy Scott.

On 4 February 2018, in a cabinet reshuffle, she was appointed Minister of Finance. In her role as Minister of Finance, Mwanakatwe tasked her department to work effectively in order to ensure that the ministry satisfies the expectations of the electorate.

In a meeting held on 20 February 2018, the minister requested that her team formulate a plan to offset domestic arrears in a systemic manner. Additionally, in this meeting she directed officials to formulate a sustainable plan to pay salaries to public service workers on time and commended the team for its commitment to improving domestic resource mobilisation.

She was relieved of her duties as Finance Minister by President Lungu on 14 July 2019.

== Family ==
Margaret Mwanakatwe is married to Mupanga Mwanakatwe, who once served as the managing director of Zamtel, the state-owned telecommunications company.
