= John Phiri (politician) =

Zambian politician (1949 or 1950 – 2024)

John Jafete Ngwata Phiri (1949 or 1950 – 7 November 2024) was a Zambian politician who served as a cabinet minister between 2011 and 2016.

== Career ==
Phiri served in the Ministry of Local Government and Ministry of Education and was also a former High Commissioner to Malawi. He was a Christian.
