= Ministry of Gender =

Government ministry of Zambia

The Ministry of Gender was a ministry in Zambia. It was headed by the Minister of Gender.

The ministry was established in 2012 by combining the Gender in Development Division of the Cabinet Office with the Child Development department of the Ministry of Community Development, Mother and Child Health. However, in 2016 Child Development was transferred to the Ministry of Sport, Youth and Child Development and the ministry was renamed the Ministry of Gender. After the 2021 general election the ministry was transformed into the Gender Division of the Office of the President.

== List of ministers ==
Minister	Party	Term start	Term end
Minister of Gender and Child Development
Inonge Wina	Patriotic Front	2012	2015
Nkandu Luo	Patriotic Front	2015	2016
Minister of Gender
Victoria Kalima	Patriotic Front	2016	2018
Elizabeth Phiri	Patriotic Front	2019	2021

=== Deputy ministers ===
Deputy Minister	Party	Term start	Term end
Deputy Minister of Gender and Child Development
Esther Banda	Patriotic Front	2012	2015
