= Joseph Katema =

Zambian politician (1961–2026)

Minister of Chiefs and Traditional Affairs
- In office February 2015 – September 2016
- President: Edgar Lungu
- Preceded by: Nkandu Luo
- Succeeded by: Lawrence Sichalwe

Member of Parliament
- In office 2006 – May 2016
- Constituency: Chingola

Personal details
- Born: 20 November 1961 Northern Rhodesia
- Died: 2 August 2026 (aged 64)
- Party: Patriotic Front
- Education: MBCHB, BSc (Medicine and Surgery)
- Profession: General Medical Practitioner

Joseph Katema (20 November 1961 – 2 August 2026) was a Zambian politician who served as the Minister of Chiefs and Traditional Affairs from January 2015 to May 2016. He died on 2 August 2026, at the age of 64.
