= Jay Emmanuel Banda =

Zambian politician

Member of the National Assembly of Zambia
- In office August 2021 – November 2024
- Constituency: Petauke Central

Personal details
- Born: 23 March 1985 (age 41)
- Party: Independent

Emmanuel "Jay Jay" Banda (born 23 March 1985) is a Zambian politician. He was the Independent member of the National Assembly of Zambia for Petauke Central from August 2021 to November 2024.

In May 2024, he disappeared in Lusaka under mysterious circumstances. He was later discovered in a hospital. In June, he was charged with stealing property worth 12,000 kwacha in 2015 and fled from police custody in August while he was hospitalised in Chipata. He was arrested in Harare, Zimbabwe, in November 2024.

On 20 December 2024, two people were arrested on suspicion of plotting to hex President Hakainde Hichilema after being hired by a brother of Banda.

== See also ==
- List of members of the National Assembly of Zambia (2021–2026)
