= 1973 Zambian general election =

- 5 December 1973
- Turnout: 39.4%
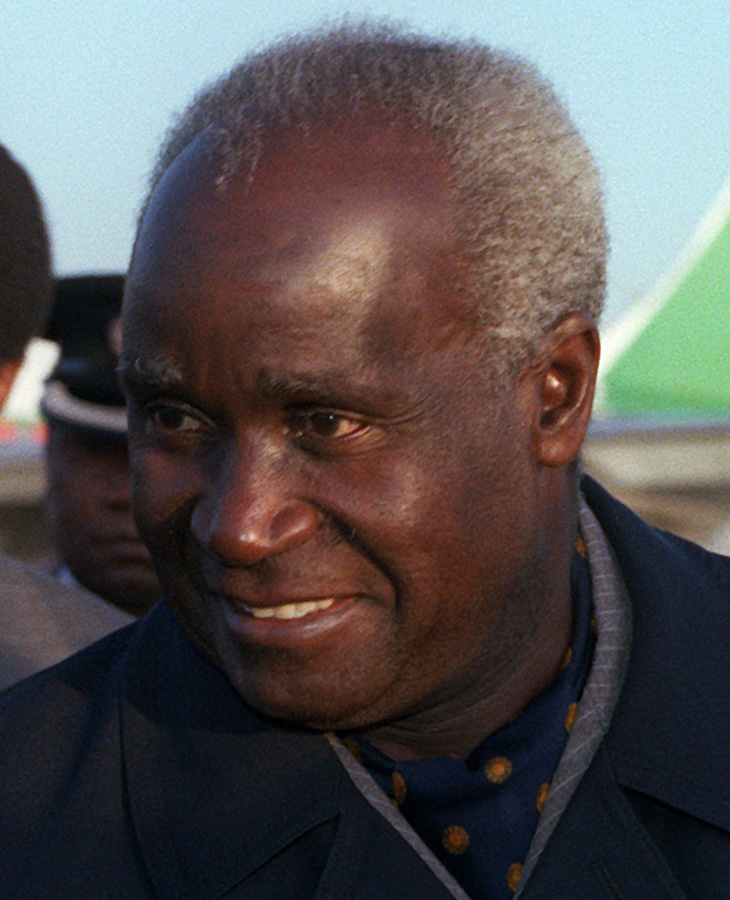
Nominee	Kenneth Kaunda
Party	UNIP
Popular vote	581,245
Percentage	88.8%
President before election
Kenneth Kaunda
UNIP
Elected President
Kenneth Kaunda
UNIP

General elections were held in Zambia on 5 December 1973. They were the first elections held since the country was formally declared a one-party state in August, with the United National Independence Party (UNIP) as the only legally permitted party. UNIP leader Kenneth Kaunda was automatically elected to a third five-year term as President, and was confirmed in office via a referendum in which 88.8% of voters approved his candidacy. UNIP also won all 125 seats in the National Assembly. Voter turnout was 39% of the 1,746,107 registered voters for the presidential election, and 33% for the National Assembly election.

Prior to the elections, primary elections were held to elect candidates for the 125 constituencies. Only UNIP members could vote in the primaries, and the top three candidates would be able to stand for the National Assembly election. In total, 532 people stood for election to the National Assembly.

== Results ==
=== President ===
Kaunda was the sole candidate for president, and voters voted yes or no to his candidacy.

Candidate	Party	Votes	%
Kenneth Kaunda	United National Independence Party	581,245	88.83
Against		73,115	11.17
Total		654,360	100.00
Valid votes		654,360	95.02
Invalid/blank votes		34,326	4.98
Total votes		688,686	100.00
Registered voters/turnout		1,746,107	39.44
Source: Nohlen et al.

=== National Assembly ===
Party	Votes	%	Seats	+/–
United National Independence Party	527,252	100.00	125	+44
Presidential appointees			10	+5
Appointed Speaker			1	New
Total	527,252	100.00	136	+11
Valid votes	527,252	90.34		
Invalid/blank votes	56,355	9.66		
Total votes	583,607	100.00		
Registered voters/turnout	1,746,107	33.42		
Source: African Elections Database

== See also ==
- List of members of the National Assembly of Zambia (1973–78)
