= 1978 Zambian general election =

- 12 December 1978
- Presidential election
- Turnout: 66.72%
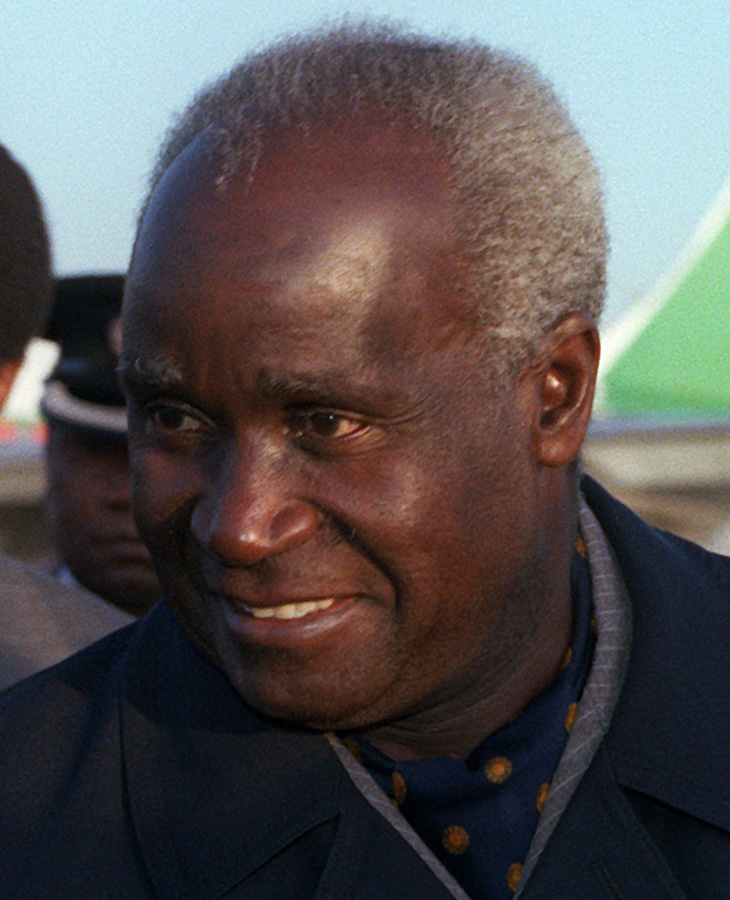
Nominee	Kenneth Kaunda
Party	UNIP
Popular vote	1,026,127
Percentage	80.74%
President before election
Kenneth Kaunda
UNIP
Elected President
Kenneth Kaunda
UNIP

General elections were held in Zambia on 12 December 1978. At the time, the country was a one-party state with the United National Independence Party (UNIP) as the sole legal party. UNIP leader Kenneth Kaunda was automatically elected to a fourth five-year term as President, with 80.7% of voters voting to confirm him in office. UNIP also won all 125 seats in the National Assembly. Voter turnout was around 65% in the parliamentary election, but 66.7% in the presidential election.

== Campaign ==
Prior to the elections, primary elections were held to elect candidates for the 125 constituencies. Only UNIP members could vote in the primaries, and the top three candidates would be able to stand for the National Assembly election. However, 30 candidates who had won primaries, including six sitting MPs, were vetoed by the party's central committee. In total, 732 people stood for election to the National Assembly. In six constituencies (in which there were 87,482 registered voters) there was only one candidate, who was returned unopposed.

== Results ==
=== President ===
Kaunda was the sole candidate for president, and voters voted yes or no to his candidacy.

Candidate	Party	Votes	%
Kenneth Kaunda	United National Independence Party	1,026,127	80.74
Against		244,719	19.26
Total		1,270,846	100.00
Valid votes		1,270,846	96.60
Invalid/blank votes		44,763	3.40
Total votes		1,315,609	100.00
Registered voters/turnout		1,971,881	66.72
Source: Nohlen et al.

=== National Assembly ===
Party	Votes	%	Seats	+/–
United National Independence Party			125	0
Presidential appointees			10	0
Appointed Speaker			1	0
Total			136	0
Total votes	1,273,462	–		
Registered voters/turnout	1,844,399	69.04		
Source: Nohlen et al., African Elections Database

== See also ==
- List of members of the National Assembly of Zambia (1978–83)
