= 1983 Zambian general election =

- 27 October 1983
- Presidential election
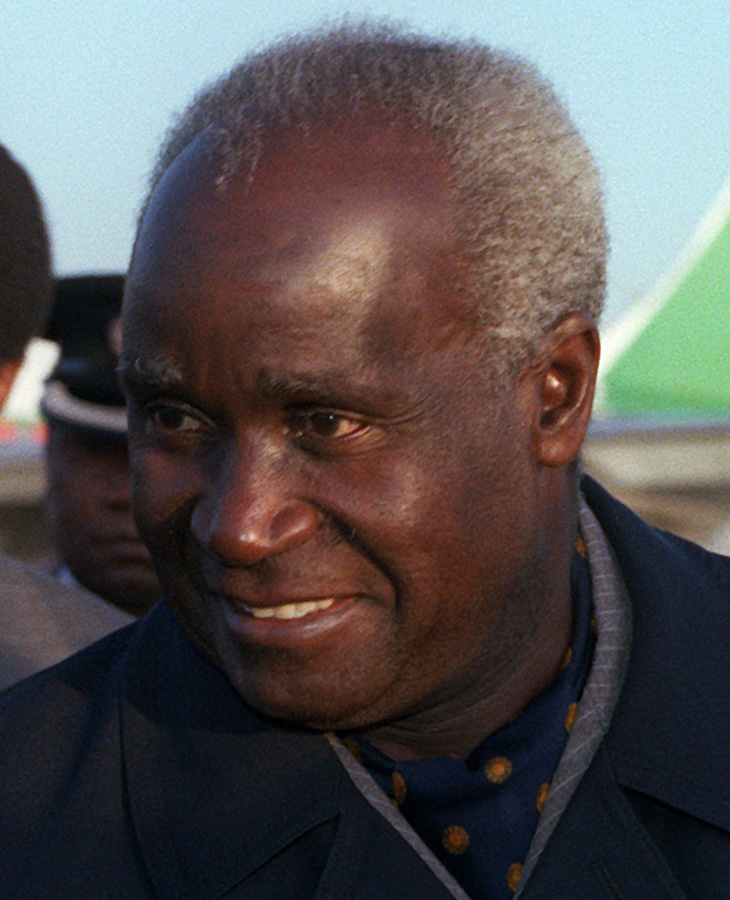
Nominee	Kenneth Kaunda
Party	UNIP
Popular vote	1,453,029
Percentage	95.38%
President before election
Kenneth Kaunda
UNIP
Elected President
Kenneth Kaunda
UNIP

General elections were held in Zambia on 27 October 1983. At the time, the country was a one-party state, with the United National Independence Party (UNIP) as the only legally permitted party. Its leader, Kenneth Kaunda was automatically re-elected for a fifth term as President, and was confirmed in office with over 95% of the vote. UNIP also won all 125 seats in the National Assembly. Voter turnout was around 63% in the parliamentary election, but 65.5% in the presidential election.

== Campaign ==
Prior to the elections, primary elections were held to elect candidates for the 125 constituencies. Only UNIP members could vote in the primaries, and the top three candidates would be able to stand for the National Assembly election. In total, 812 people stood for election to the National Assembly, with 46 rejected by the UNIP central committee.

== Results ==
=== President ===
Kaunda was the sole candidate for president, and voters voted yes or no to his candidacy. Some sources reported the results to be 93% for and 7% against.

Candidate	Party	Votes	%
Kenneth Kaunda	United National Independence Party	1,453,029	95.38
Against		70,355	4.62
Total		1,523,384	100.00
Valid votes		1,523,384	97.77
Invalid/blank votes		34,679	2.23
Total votes		1,558,063	100.00
Registered voters/turnout		2,377,610	65.53
Source: Nohlen et al.

=== National Assembly ===
Party	Votes	%	Seats	+/–
United National Independence Party			125	0
Presidential appointees			10	0
Appointed Speaker			1	0
Total			136	0
Total votes	1,572,333	–		
Registered voters/turnout	2,377,610	66.13		
Source: Nohlen et al., African Elections Database

== See also ==
- List of members of the National Assembly of Zambia (1983–88)
