= 2011 Zambian general election =

- 20 September 2011
- Presidential election
- Registered: 5,167,154
- Turnout: 52.89% (▲8.06 pp)
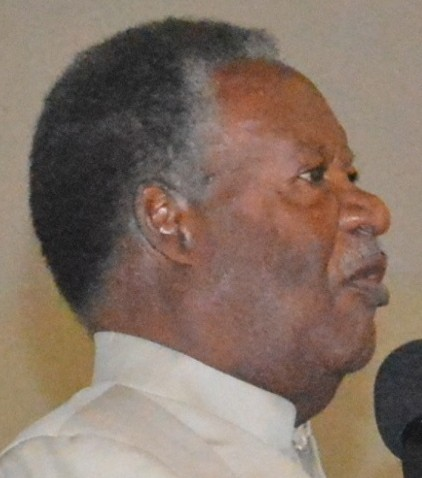

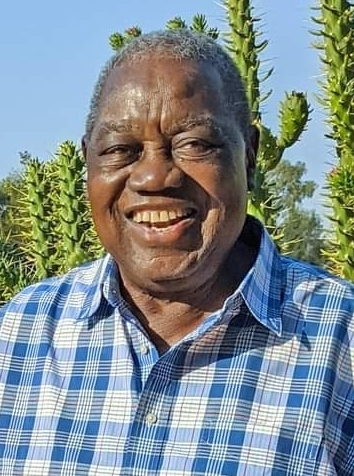

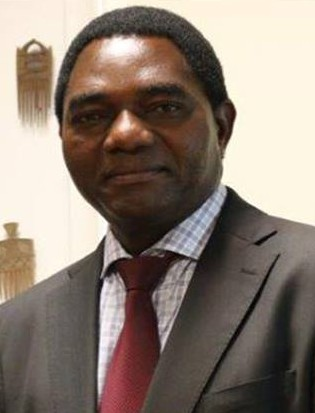
Nominee	Michael Sata	Rupiah Banda	Hakainde Hichilema
Party	PF	MMD	UPND
Popular vote	1,170,966	987,866	506,763
Percentage	42.85%	36.15%	18.54%
- Presidential results by National Assembly constituency
President before election
Rupiah Banda
MMD
Elected President
Michael Sata
PF
- Parliamentary election
- 150 of the 159 seats in the National Assembly; 80 seats needed for a majority
- Turnout: 53.63% (▼17.58 pp)
Party	Leader	Vote %	Seats	+/–
PF	Michael Sata	38.42	60	+13
MMD	Rupiah Banda	33.44	55	−17
UPND	Hakainde Hichilema	17.21	28	0
ADD	Charles Milupi	1.22	1	New
FDD	Edith Nawakwi	0.75	1	0
Independents	–	7.45	3	0
This lists parties that won seats. See the complete results below.
Speaker of the National Assembly before	Speaker of the National Assembly after
Amusaa Mwanamwambwa; MMD	Patrick Matibini; PF

General elections were held in Zambia on 20 September 2011, electing a President and members of the National Assembly. Michael Sata of the Patriotic Front (PF) won the presidential elections, defeating incumbent Rupiah Banda of the Movement for Multi-Party Democracy (MMD), and was sworn into office on 23 September. The PF emerged as the largest party in the National Assembly, winning 60 of the 148 seats decided on election day.

== Campaign ==
Incumbent President Rupiah Banda, of the ruling Movement for Multi-Party Democracy party, ran for his first full term as president after replacing Levy Mwanawasa, who died in August 2008.

Michael Sata was the candidate of the Patriotic Front and Hakainde Hichilema was the candidate of the United Party for National Development.

With Chinese companies investing US$2 billion by the end of 2010 in the Zambian economy, the status of Chinese business ties with Zambia, Africa's largest copper producer, grew significantly. Early in his campaign, Sata accused the Chinese mining firms of having slave-like labour conditions and ignoring safety standards and local cultural practices. He has been nicknamed "King Cobra" because of his harsh rhetoric, but he later toned down his rhetoric against the mostly Chinese foreign mining firms.

== Conduct ==
Two days before the results were officially announced, the High Court banned three independent media outlets from publishing speculation on the result after The Post published a headline reading "Sata Heads for Victory." The same day, Banda's office also said that such reports were "rumours" as no final result had been compiled. The delay in announcing the results was the cause of riots in Ndola and Kitwe, where youths fought with riot police while also burning vehicles and markets. Additionally, hackers attacked the Election Commission's website that night and posted false results suggesting Sata won by a landslide.

European Union electoral observers said that the election was "generally well administered," but that there was not equitable access to resources, resulting in the lack of a "level playing field" in the campaign. They said that state-owned media had failed to meet "even their minimal obligations as public service media."

The Zambian-based Foundation for Democratic Process criticised the holding of the election without electoral reform. It blamed the history of electoral violence and the previous failure of the losing parties to accept losing on the lack of reform. While a number of people called for the establishment of a 50% + 1 vote system for electing the president, the government said a new system would not be used for the election.

== Results ==
On 23 September, Chief Justice Ernest Sakala announced Sata the winner of the election with 1,150,045 votes, or 43%, with 95.3% of votes counted. Banda received 961,796 votes, or 36.1%, and other minor parties trailed in the poll. Sata was sworn into office later that day.

=== President ===
Candidate	Party	Votes	%
Michael Sata	Patriotic Front	1,170,966	42.85
Rupiah Banda	Movement for Multi-Party Democracy	987,866	36.15
Hakainde Hichilema	United Party for National Development	506,763	18.54
Charles Milupi	Alliance for Democracy and Development	26,270	0.96
Elias Chipimo Jr	National Restoration Party	10,672	0.39
Tilyenji Kaunda	United National Independence Party	9,950	0.36
Edith Nawakwi	Forum for Democracy and Development	6,833	0.25
Ng'andu Peter Magande	National Movement for Progress	6,344	0.23
Godfrey Miyanda	Heritage Party	4,730	0.17
Frederick Mutesa	Zambians for Empowerment and Development	2,268	0.08
Total		2,732,662	100.00
Valid votes		2,732,662	98.57
Invalid/blank votes		39,602	1.43
Total votes		2,772,264	100.00
Registered voters/turnout		5,167,154	53.65
Source: Electoral Commission

=== National Assembly ===
Voting did not take place in two constituencies (Magoye and Nakonde) on polling day due to deaths of candidates, and the elected member for Chongwe (Japhen Mwakalombe of the MMD) resigned before taking his seat. By-elections were held for all three seats on 24 November 2011, with the PF winning two (Chongwe and Nakonde) and the UPND one (Magoye).

Party	Votes	%	Seats	+/–
Patriotic Front	1,037,108	38.42	60	+17
Movement for Multi-Party Democracy	902,619	33.44	55	−17
United Party for National Development	464,527	17.21	28	–
Alliance for Democracy and Development	33,057	1.22	1	New
Forum for Democracy and Development	20,243	0.75	1	–
United National Independence Party	18,446	0.68	0	–
National Movement for Progress	11,828	0.44	0	New
National Restoration Party	4,688	0.17	0	New
Zambians for Empowerment and Development	3,059	0.11	0	New
New Generation Party	657	0.02	0	0
National Revolution Party	505	0.02	0	New
Heritage Party	485	0.02	0	0
Unified Party for Democracy and Development	308	0.01	0	New
National Party	193	0.01	0	0
Zambia Direct Democracy Movement	177	0.01	0	0
Zambian Conservative Party	168	0.01	0	New
All People's Congress Party	139	0.01	0	0
Citizens' Democratic Party	137	0.01	0	0
United Liberal Party	131	0.00	0	–3
Federal Democratic Party	27	0.00	0	0
Independents	201,089	7.45	3	0
Presidential appointees			8	0
Appointed Speaker			1	0
Vacant			2	–
Total	2,699,591	100.00	159	0
Valid votes	2,699,591	98.68		
Invalid/blank votes	36,132	1.32		
Total votes	2,735,723	100.00		
Registered voters/turnout	5,101,312	53.63		
Source: Electoral Commission

== Reactions ==
Sata received a congratulatory telephone call from his U.S. counterpart Barack Obama. While in the 2006 election China had threatened to cut diplomatic relations with Zambia if Sata was elected, due to his criticisms of Chinese mining interests in the country, China issued a statement "welcoming" the result.

== Analysis ==
Psephologists suggested that the youth vote helped anti-incumbency in a continent that rarely results in an anti-incumbent vote. They also drew parallels with the 2011 ousting of the presidents of Tunisia and Egypt. As a result of Sata's rhetoric, there were also concerns about the future investment climate in the country. Other readings said that after Sata toned down his rhetoric he did not differ much from Banda, but benefited from a crowded ballot of candidates. Psephologists also indicated that Sata did well in the urban areas, while Banda was expected to do well in the rural areas.

== See also ==
- List of members of the National Assembly of Zambia (2011–16)
