= Movement for Multi-Party Democracy =

Zambian political party, dominant 1991–2011

New Nation party Movement for Multi-Party Democracy
- Abbreviation: NNP
- Founded: July 1990
- Ideology: Social democracy Third Way; Progressivism; Reformism
- Political position: Centre to centre-left
- National affiliation: UPND Alliance
- Colours: Blue
- Slogan: The Hour for New Hope
- National Assembly: 0 / 166
- Pan African Parliament: 0 / 5

Website
- mmdzambia.org

The Movement for Multi-party Democracy (MMD) (renamed the New Nation Party in November 2025) is a political party in Zambia. Originally formed to oust the previous government, MMD controlled an absolute majority in parliament between 1991 and 2001, when its past leader, Frederick Chiluba was President of Zambia. Its election into power in 1991 ended the 27-year rule of President Kenneth Kaunda and his United National Independence Party (UNIP). It remained the dominant party within Zambian politics until the general elections of September 2011.

== History ==
=== Formation and government ===
Growing opposition to UNIP's monopoly on power, due in part to economic problems and corruption, led to the formation of the MMD in July 1990, led by Frederick Chiluba, the head of the country's trade unions. During that same year, pushed by internal and international pressure, Kaunda agreed to a referendum on the one-party state, but in the face of continued opposition, dropped the referendum and signed a constitutional amendment that relinquished UNIP's guaranteed right to rule.

Multi-party general elections were held on 31 October 1991, and saw the MMD sweep to power in a massive landslide. Chiluba was elected president with 76% of the vote to Kaunda's 24%, whilst the MMD won 125 of the 150 elected seats in the National Assembly. However, by the end of Chiluba's first five-year term as president, the MMD's commitment to political reform had faded in the face of re-election demands and several prominent members left to establish other parties.

Relying on the MMD's overwhelming majority in parliament, President Chiluba in May 1996 pushed through constitutional amendments that effectively eliminated former President Kaunda and other prominent opposition leaders from the 1996 general elections. As a result, UNIP boycotted the elections, allowing Chiluba to be easily re-elected with 73% of the vote, whilst the MMD won 131 of the 150 seats in the National Assembly. Afterward, however, several opposition parties and non-governmental organisations declared the elections neither free nor fair.

Early in 2001, supporters of President Chiluba mounted a campaign to amend the constitution to enable Chiluba to seek a third term of office; the campaign led to further breakaways from the MMD, including the Forum for Democracy and Development and the Heritage Party. Eventually civil society, opposition parties, and other MMD members exerted sufficient pressure on Chiluba to force him to back away from any attempt at a third term.

Levy Mwanawasa was selected as the MMD presidential candidate for the 2001 elections, winning with just 28% of the vote. Although the MMD remained the largest party in the National Assembly, it lost its majority after being reduced to 69 seats. Three parties submitted petitions to the High Court, challenging the election results. The petition remained under consideration by the courts in February 2003 when it was ruled that while there had been irregularities these had not been large enough to affect the outcome; thus the result was upheld. Opposition parties won a majority of parliamentary seats in the December, 2001 election, but subsequent by-elections and liberal use of government patronage to secure the support of opposition MPs gave the ruling MMD a slim majority in Parliament.

Mwanawasa was re-elected in the 2006 general elections with 43% of the vote, with the MMD winning 72 seats in the National Assembly.

Following the sudden death of Mwanawasa in August 2008, a presidential by-election was held. Rupiah Banda was chosen as the MMD candidate, and was elected with 40% of the national vote, narrowly defeating Michael Sata of the Patriotic Front (PF) by a margin of around 2%.

=== Opposition ===
However, the 2011 general elections saw Sata defeat Banda by a margin of 42%–35%, whilst the MMD won only 55 seats in the National Assembly to the PF's 60. The following year Nevers Mumba was elected as MMD president, defeating rival Felix Mutati and several other candidates.

=== 2015 presidential by-elections ===
In the 2015 presidential by-election former party president Mr. Rupiah Banda returned from political retirement and claimed that he would be the candidate of the Party in that by election, whilst the Party through the National Executive Committee (NEC) backed its party president Dr. Mumba. The issue went to the Supreme Court and the Court ruled that Dr. Mumba as party president had the right to run for President on the party ticket.

The judgement was passed two weeks before the election date and partially due to that the MMD with Dr. Mumba as its candidate received 0.87% of the vote.

=== 2016 illegal MMD convention ===
In May 2016, a group of former and expelled MMD members elected former Lunte MP Felix Mutati as party president at a convention at the Mulungushi Rock of Authority in Kabwe, whilst the party continued supporting Nevers Mumba.

=== 2019 Judge Newa Judgement ===
On 9 November 2019, High Court Judge Sharon Newa sitting in Lusaka ruled that the convention that elected Felix Mutati as Party President was illegal and all decisions made between then and that date were declared null and void. It further ruled that Dr. Nevers Mumba was the MMD President and that Felix Mutati and Raphael Nakachinda remained expelled members of the MMD. Nevers Mumba was the MMD presidential candidate at the 2021 general election, with the party winning 0 seats in parliament.

=== UPND Alliance ===
On 30 October 2024, the MMD decided to join the UPND Alliance, a coalition of political parties, effectively deciding that it will not field its own presidential candidate at the 2026 general election and will endorse the United Party for National Development president, Hakainde Hichilema, at that election.

On 6 November 2025, party president Nevers Mumba announced that the Movement for Multi-Party Democracy has changed its name to the New Nation Party (NNP) as part of a rebranding process.

In mid-September 2026, party president Nevers Mumba retired from active politics with immediate effect, thereby stepping down as the president of the New Nation Party.

== Electoral history ==
=== Presidential elections ===
Election	Party candidate	Votes	%	Result
1991	Frederick Chiluba	972,212	75.76%	Elected ✓
1996	Frederick Chiluba	913,770	72.59%	Elected ✓
2001	Levy Mwanawasa	506,694	29.15%	Elected ✓
2006	Levy Mwanawasa	1,177,846	42.98%	Elected ✓
2008	Rupiah Banda	718,359	40.09%	Elected ✓
2011	Rupiah Banda	987,866	35.42%	Lost ✗
2015	Nevers Mumba	14,609	0.87%	Lost ✗
2016	Did not take part			
2021	Nevers Mumba	4,968	0.10%	Lost ✗

=== National Assembly elections ===
Election	Votes	%	Seats	+/–	Position	Result
1991	931,945	74.01%	125 / 159	▲125	▲1st	Supermajority government
1996	778,989	60.88%	131 / 159	▲6	1st	Supermajority government
2001	490,680	28.02%	69 / 159	▼62	1st	Minority government
2006	1,059,526	39.05%	72 / 159	▲3	1st	Minority government
2011	902,619	33.44%	55 / 159	▼17	▼2nd	Opposition
2016	99,356	2.71%	3 / 156	▼52	▼3rd	Opposition
2021	3,665	0.08%	0 / 167	▼3	▼10th	Extra-parliamentary
