= Patriotic Front (Zambia) =

Social democratic political party in Zambia

- President: Miles Sampa
- Founder: Michael Sata
- Founded: 21 September 2001
- Split from: MMD
- Headquarters: Farmer House, Cairo Road, Lusaka
- Ideology: Social democracy Social conservatism
- Political position: Centre-left
- International affiliation: Socialist International (consultative)
- Colours: Black; Blue; Green; White
- Slogan: For Lower Taxes, More Jobs and More Money in Your Pockets
- National Assembly: 60 / 156
- Pan African Parliament: 2 / 5

Election symbol
- Boat

Website
- www.patrioticfront.org

The Patriotic Front (PF) is a political party in Zambia, founded in 2001 by Michael Sata. It emerged as a breakaway party from the Movement for Multiparty Democracy (MMD) after Sata was not selected as the MMD's presidential candidate for the 2001 elections. The PF is primarily supported by the youth and the urban poor, and it gained significant political influence over time.

The party first came to power after winning the 2011 general elections, with Michael Sata winning the presidential election. After Sata's death in 2014, Edgar Lungu became the party's leader and won subsequent presidential elections in 2015 and 2016. However, in the 2021 elections, the PF lost power to the United Party for National Development (UPND) led by Hakainde Hichilema.

The PF is associated with social democracy and has been a member of the Socialist International as a consultative party. Its political position is considered centre-left.

== History ==
The Patriotic Front (PF) was formed as a political party on 21 September 2001. In 2000, after Frederick Chiluba lost a bid to change the constitution to allow him to stand for a third term, Michael Sata thought he would be endorsed as the MMD presidential candidate. The answer was given in 2001 when Chiluba noted that none of those (including Sata) who were in his government at the time were capable of winning the elections. At a secret ballot, Chiluba personally nominated Mwanawasa and voted for him to be the presidential candidate. Angered by this turn of events, Sata quit the MMD and founded the PF. Sata became leader of the PF and was its presidential candidate for the 2001 general elections; he received 3.4% of the vote, finishing seventh out of the eleven candidates. In the National Assembly elections the party received 2.8% of the vote, winning a single seat.

Sata was again the party's presidential candidate in the 2006 general elections, this time finishing second to Levy Patrick Mwanawasa with 29% of the vote. With its National Assembly vote share increasing to 23%, the party won 43 seats, becoming the largest opposition party. Following Mwanawasa's death, a presidential by-election was held in 2008. Sata finished second to MMD candidate Rupiah Banda with 38% of the vote to Banda's 40%.

The 2011 general elections saw a reversal of the 2008 result, with Sata beating Banda by a margin of 42% to 35%. The PF also became the largest party in the National Assembly, winning 60 of the 150 seats. However, Sata died in office in October 2014. Vice-President Guy Scott took over as interim president until a by-election was held in January 2015. Edgar Lungu was selected as the party's candidate, and won the election with 48% of the vote. Inonge Wina was appointed as the Vice President of Zambia.

At the 2016 general election, Edgar Lungu won again as the president with 50.35%, beating Hakainde Hichilema by 100,530 votes or 2.72%.

In the lead up to the 2021 general election, Amnesty International publicly raised concerns about the violation of civil liberties, crackdowns on dissent and police killings while the party held political power.

At the 2021 general election, Edgar Lungu was once again the party's candidate. The PF came out second at that election, getting 1,870,780 votes while Hakainde Hichilema of the UPND got 2,852,348 votes. The PF once again became the largest opposition party, winning 60 of the 156 parliamentary seats.

=== Factionalism ===
Soon after the 2021 general election, Lungu decided to retire from active politics and the party's vice president, Given Lubinda, became the acting president of the party going forward. Eight Patriotic Front members (excluding Lubinda) decided to stand for the position of party president, awaiting a party convention. Some members claimed that the Patriotic Front was taking too long to hold its party convention to choose the leader.

In October 2023, there was a controversial extraordinary general conference that took place in which Miles Sampa (the Matero member of parliament) was declared the president of the Patriotic Front party. Lubinda and other members of the party argued that the convention that took place was illegal and was against the party's constitution, with the matter taken to the Lusaka High Court.

In the same month, Edgar Lungu had announced his return to active politics and Lubinda subsequently gave Lungu back the position of party president for the faction while he would remain as the faction's vice-president. The high court lifted the injunction on Sampa assuming his role as party president, which meant that the Patriotic Front would have two factions with Lungu as the president of one and Sampa as the president of the other. On 25 May 2024, the Lusaka High Court dismissed a case in which six of the PF presidential candidates challenged the election of Sampa as the PF president, declaring him as the party president until further notice.

As the leader of one of the two factions of the PF, Lungu decided to join the United Kwacha Alliance (UKA), an alliance of opposition political parties in Zambia, in early 2024. In November 2024, Lungu's PF faction was invited to join the Tonse Alliance and it accepted, with Lungu being appointed the alliance chairperson and being chosen as the presidential candidate for the alliance for the 2026 general election. Due to UKA not being in support of a political party belonging to more than one alliance, it was decided that Lungu and the PF were no-longer part of UKA.

On 30 June 2024, Sampa decided to dismiss his secretary-general (SG), Morgan Ng'ona, from his SG position. Within a week, the court issued an ex-parte stay order which blocked Sampa's decision to dismiss Ng'ona as SG. Ng'ona then decided to dismiss Sampa as the president of the party and appoint Robert Chabinga (who was the Mafinga MP and leader of the opposition) as the acting party president in July 2024, effectively creating a third faction within the Patriotic Front. This leadership dispute between Sampa and Chabinga was taken to court.

On 1 May 2025, Sampa decided to reunite his Patriotic Front faction with the faction for Lungu, effectively stepping down from the party presidency. Lungu was handed back the party presidency and Given Lubinda was handed back the party vice-presidency by Sampa. On 5 June 2025, Lungu died after suffering cardiac complications from a surgery he was undergoing at the Mediclinic Medforum in Pretoria, South Africa and once again, Lubinda became the acting president of this PF faction. Chabinga was still the acting president of the other faction and the matter of who is the rightful leader of the PF was still in court.

In January 2026, due to state authorities recognizing Chabinga as the president of the Patriotic Front, the Kabwe High Court issued an injunction which effectively banned the other faction led by Lubinda from doing activities in the name of the Patriotic Front.

On 11 March 2026, the Patriotic Front faction with Lubinda as the acting president formed the PF Pamodzi Alliance and officially decided to exit from the Tonse Alliance due to internal disagreements. On 15 March 2026, Lubinda announced that after many delays, his PF faction would host a convention to choose their new leader within four days. The convention took place virtually on 21 March 2026 and the delegates that were present elected Makebi Zulu to be the president of the party faction with 49.2% of the vote, with Chitalu Chilufya getting 34.1% of the vote. Given Lubinda, Chishimba Kambwili and Chanda Katotobwe were also candidates. With the Kabwe High Court injunction from January still in effect, some sections of society labelled this convention as unlawful while a few politicians who also wanted to contest the PF presidency (Willah Mudolo and Miles Sampa) decided to stay away from this convention due to the injunction. Within the following week, secretary general Morgan Ng'ona reported Zulu and Lubinda among others to the Kabwe High Court for letting the convention happen contrary to the injunction.

On 3 March 2026, the Lusaka High Court had dismissed the case in which Morgan Ng'ona challenged his expulsion from the PF by Sampa, which meant that the appointment of Robert Chabinga as party president would have to be nullified and his faction would no longer operate. On 27 March 2026, the Lusaka High Court had ruled that the 24 October 2023 convention that elected Sampa as party president was not illegal. Due to these two judgements, Sampa proceeded to recognize himself as the PF president once again and proceeded to declare a few changes within the party, thereby creating a party faction that is separate from the one that is a member of the PF Pamodzi Alliance and elected Makebi Zulu as party president.

Due to Miles Sampa being recognized as the PF party president, the PF faction led by Makebi Zulu opted to use a different party from among the membership of the PF Pamodzi Alliance for candidacy at the 2026 general election and the Resolute Party was chosen as the special purpose vehicle in early May 2026 after a meeting by the party leaders within the alliance. So, Zulu and any adopted candidates for ward councillors, mayors and members of parliament would be adopted using the Resolute Party and not the Patriotic Front.

In late April 2026, it was reported that the PF faction led by Sampa had chosen Chitalu Chilufya to stand for presidency at the 2026 general election. However, on 18 May 2026, Sampa had made a public announcement stating that the Patriotic Front will withdraw its presidential candidate and not participate in the 2026 general election. The next day, Chilufya withdrew his intentions to stand as the Patriotic Front presidential candidate, stating that the party was still going through legal challenges. Sampa proceeded to apply to stand as an independent MP candidate in the newly-created Lima constituency while Chilufya proceeded to apply to stand as an independent MP candidate in the newly-created Mansa West constituency, which meant that the Patriotic Front would not field any candidate at any local government level at the 2026 general election. Sampa then withdrew his independent candidacy in Lima constituency in order to focus on the Patriotic Front issues while Chilufya officially resigned from the party to contest in Mansa.

In June 2026, Sampa reported that the central committee in his party faction had endorsed the incumbent head of state (Hakainde Hichilema of the UPND) to win the 2026 general election. On 12 June 2026, Sampa's party faction joined the UPND Alliance.

== Electoral history ==
=== Presidential elections ===
Election	Party candidate	Votes	%	Result
2001	Michael Sata	59,172	3.40%	Lost ✗
2006	Michael Sata	804,748	29.37%	Lost ✗
2008	Michael Sata	683,150	38.13%	Lost ✗
2011	Michael Sata	1,170,966	41.98%	Elected ✓
2015	Edgar Lungu	807,925	48.33%	Elected ✓
2016	Edgar Lungu	1,860,877	50.35%	Elected ✓
2021	Edgar Lungu	1,870,780	38.71%	Lost ✗

=== National Assembly elections ===
Election	Votes	%	Seats	+/–	Position	Outcome
2001	49,362	2.82%	1 / 159	▲1	▲7th	Opposition
2006	622,864	22.96%	43 / 159	▲42	▲2nd	Opposition
2011	1,037,108	38.42%	60 / 159	▲17	▲1st	Minority government
2016	1,537,946	42.01%	80 / 156	▲20	1st	Majority government
2021	1,722,718	35.70%	60 / 156	▼20	▼2nd	Opposition
