= First Hichilema Cabinet =

Executive government of Zambia

- 15th Cabinet of Zambia
- Yes
- Composition of the National Assembly
- Date formed: 24 August 2021

People and organisations
- President: Hakainde Hichilema
- Vice-President: Mutale Nalumango
- No. of ministers: 25
- Total no. of members: 25
- Member party: UPND
- Status in legislature: Majority government

History
- Incoming formation: Election of Hichilema in August 2021
- Election: 2021
- Outgoing election: 2016
- Legislature term: 2021–2026
- Advice and consent: National Assembly
- Predecessor: Second Lungu Cabinet
- Successor: Second Hichilema Cabinet

The First Hichilema Cabinet is the executive government of the Republic of Zambia under the leadership of President Hakainde Hichilema. It was formed following Hichilema’s victory in the 2021 Zambian general election, in which his party, the UPND, defeated the incumbent PF led by President Edgar Lungu. Hichilema was sworn in on 24 August 2021, and the formation of his cabinet marked a significant transition in Zambia’s political landscape, emphasizing anti-corruption, economic recovery, and institutional reform.

The cabinet included a mix of experienced politicians and technocrats, with a notable commitment to gender inclusion and youth representation. The Vice-President, Mutale Nalumango, became the second woman in Zambia’s history to hold the position.

== Composition ==
The cabinet was composed of ministers appointed under Article 116 of the Constitution of Zambia, including ministers of finance, health, education, foreign affairs, home affairs, and others. Several ministries were realigned or merged to reflect the administration’s priorities.

Members of the First Hichilema Cabinet
Portfolio	Minister	Term start
Vice-President	Mutale Nalumango	24 August 2021
Secretary to the Cabinet	Patrick Kangwa	December 2022
Minister of Finance and National Planning	Situmbeko Musokotwane	27 August 2021
Minister of Foreign Affairs and International Cooperation	Stanley Kakubo	27 August 2021
Minister of Home Affairs and Internal Security	Jack Mwiimbu	27 August 2021
Minister of Justice	Mulambo Haimbe	27 August 2021
Minister of Education	Douglas Syakalima	27 August 2021
Minister of Health	Sylvia Masebo	27 August 2021
Minister of Local Government and Rural Development	Gary Nkombo	27 August 2021
Minister of Mines and Minerals Development	Paul Kabuswe	27 August 2021
Minister of Energy	Peter Kapala	27 August 2021
Minister of Agriculture	Reuben Mtolo Phiri	27 August 2021
Minister of Defence	Ambrose Lufuma	27 August 2021
Minister of Information and Media	Chushi Kasanda	27 August 2021
Minister of Labour and Social Security	Brenda Tambatamba	27 August 2021
Minister of Commerce, Trade and Industry	Chipoka Mulenga	27 August 2021
Minister of Transport and Logistics	Frank Tayali	27 August 2021
Minister of Tourism	Rodney Sikumba	27 August 2021
Minister of Green Economy and Environment	Collins Nzovu	27 August 2021
Minister of Technology and Science	Felix Mutati	27 August 2021
Minister of Community Development and Social Services	Doreen Mwamba	27 August 2021
Minister of Youth, Sport and Arts	Elvis Nkandu	27 August 2021
Minister of Water Development and Sanitation	Mike Mposha	27 August 2021
Minister for Central Province	Princess Kasune	27 August 2021
Minister for Copperbelt Province	Elisha Matambo	27 August 2021
Minister for Southern Province	Cornelius Mweetwa	27 August 2021

The Current Cabinet Ministers as of February 2026
Incumbent	Office	Term began
Cornelius Mweetwa	Minister – Information and Media	September 25, 2023
Mulambo Haimbe	Minister – Foreign Affairs and International Cooperation	June 5, 2024
Mike Mposha	Minister – Green Economy and Environment	June 14, 2024
Paul C C Kabuswe	Minister – Mines and Minerals Development	September 17, 2021
Chipoka Mulenga	Minister – Commerce, Trade and Industry	September 17, 2021
Frank Tayali	Minister – Transport and Logistics	September 17, 2021
Reuben Mtolo Phiri	Minister – Agriculture	September 17, 2021
Douglas Munsaka Syakalima	Minister – Education	September 17, 2021
Elijah Julaki Muchima	Minister – Health	July 22, 2024
Collins Nzovu	Minister – Water Development and Sanitation	June 14, 2024
Elvis Chishala Nkandu	Minister – Youth, Sport and Arts	September 17, 2021
Sylvia Masebo	Minister – Lands and Natural Resources	July 22, 2024
Ambrose Lwiji Lufuma	Minister – Defence	September 17, 2021
Brenda Mwika Tambatamba	Minister – Labour and Social Security	September 17, 2021
Rodney Sikumba	Minister – Tourism	September 17, 2021
Jacob Jack Mwiimbu	Minister – Home Affairs and Internal Security	September 17, 2021
Situmbeko Musokotwane	Minister – Finance and National Planning	September 17, 2021
Gift Sialubalo	Minister – Local Government and Rural Development	March 28, 2025
Makozo Chikote	Minister – Energy	July 20, 2024
Peter Chibwe Kapala	Minister – Fisheries and Livestock	July 20, 2024
Doreen Mwamba	Minister – Community Development and Social Services	September 17, 2021
Charles Milupi	Minister – Infrastructure, Housing and Urban Development	September 17, 2021
Felix C Mutati	Minister – Technology and Science	September 17, 2021
Princess Kasune	Minister – Justice	June 5, 2024

Former Members of the First Hichilema Cabinet
Portfolio	Minister	Term start	Term end	Reason for change
Minister of Health	Elijah Muchima	22 July 2024	19 February 2026	Relieved of duties by the president; Cornelius Mweetwa appointed as acting minister.
Minister of Small and Medium Enterprises Development	Elias Mubanga	17 September 2021	19 February 2026	Relieved of duties by the president.

== Notable Policies and Reforms ==
- Re-engagement with the International Monetary Fund for debt restructuring.
- Establishment of the Presidential Delivery Unit.
- Launch of the Public–Private Dialogue Forum.
- Anti-corruption and public sector reform drive.
- Restoration of media freedoms and human rights protections.

== See also ==
- Hakainde Hichilema
- United Party for National Development
- Politics of Zambia
- 2021 Zambian general election
