= Second cabinet of Hakainde Hichilema =

Cabinet of Zambia under President Hakainde Hichilema from 2026

Second Hichilema Cabinet
- 16th Cabinet of Zambia
- Yes
- President Hakainde Hichilema at his Inauguration
- Date formed: 14 September 2026

People and organisations
- President: Hakainde Hichilema
- Vice-President: Mutale Nalumango
- No. of ministers: 4
- Total no. of members: 6
- Member party: UPND
- Status in legislature: Majority government

History
- Incoming formation: Re-election of Hakainde Hichilema in August 2026
- Election: 2026
- Outgoing election: 2021
- Legislature term: 2026–2031
- Predecessor: First Hichilema Cabinet

Hakainde Hichilema began his second term as President of Zambia on 1 September 2026, following his victory in the 2026 Zambian general election. The president has the constitutional authority to appoint ministers from among members of the National Assembly under Article 116 of the Constitution of Zambia.

The Second Hichilema Cabinet is the cabinet formed by Hichilema for his second term in office. The first four ministers were appointed on 14 September 2026, with Situmbeko Musokotwane reappointed as Minister of Finance and National Planning, Mulambo Haimbe reappointed as Minister of Foreign Affairs and International Cooperation, and Roma Chilengi and Gilbert Siame appointed as Minister of Health and Minister of Green Economy and Environment, respectively.

As of 14 September 2026, the cabinet was still being constituted, with further ministerial appointments expected. The Ministers (Prescribed Number and Responsibilities) Act provides for a maximum of 30 ministers.

== Cabinet ==
The President appoints ministers from among the members of the National Assembly under Article 116 of the Constitution of Zambia. Ministers are responsible, under the direction of the President, for the policy and strategic direction of their assigned ministry, department or other state institution. The number of ministers is prescribed by the Ministers (Prescribed Number and Responsibilities) Act, 2016, which provides that the President may appoint no more than 30 ministers. The Act also sets out responsibilities of ministers in relation to government business and legislation in the National Assembly.

Cabinet meetings are presided over by the President. In the President's absence, the Vice-President presides, or, in the absence of both, a member of Cabinet appointed by the President. The Constitution requires Cabinet to meet at least once every month.

Following Hakainde Hichilema's re-election in the 2026 Zambian general election, the first four ministers of his second administration were appointed on 14 September 2026. Situmbeko Musokotwane was reappointed as Minister of Finance and National Planning, while Mulambo Haimbe was reappointed as Minister of Foreign Affairs and International Cooperation. Roma Chilengi was appointed Minister of Health and Gilbert Siame was appointed Minister of Green Economy and Environment. Further appointments were yet to be announced.

== Elected officials ==
=== President ===
Hakainde Hichilema was re-elected as President of Zambia in the 2026 Zambian general election. He was declared the winner by the Electoral Commission of Zambia on 18 August 2026 and was sworn in for a second term on 1 September 2026.

President of Zambia
Portrait	Name	Date of birth	Birthplace	Background	Reference
	Hakainde Hichilema	June 4, 1962 (age 64)	Monze District, Southern Province	President of Zambia (2021–present); President of the United Party for National Development (2006–present); UPND presidential candidate (2021); UPND presidential candidate (2026); Businessman	

=== Vice President ===
The Vice-President of Zambia is elected on the same ticket as the President. The Vice-President is the principal assistant to the President and performs the functions assigned by the President and those provided for by the Constitution. The Vice-President also serves as deputy chairperson of the Cabinet.

Mutale Nalumango was re-elected Vice-President of Zambia alongside President Hakainde Hichilema in the 2026 Zambian general election. They were sworn into office on 1 September 2026, beginning their second five-year terms.

Vice-President of Zambia
Portrait	Name	Date of birth	Birthplace	Background	Reference
	Mutale Nalumango	March 1, 1954 (age 72)	Lukulu, Western Province	Vice-President of Zambia (2021–present); Speaker of the National Assembly of Zambia (2011–2015); Member of the National Assembly of Zambia for Kaputa (2006–2011); Deputy Speaker of the National Assembly (2006–2011); Teachers Union of Zambia Vice-president	

== Appointments ==
=== 14 September 2026 ===
On 14 September 2026, Hichilema announced the first four ministerial appointments of his second administration. Two ministers from his first cabinet were retained, while two new ministers were appointed.

=== List of ministers ===
Portfolio	Minister	Took office	Left office
Agriculture	Moses Moyo	28 October 2026	Incumbent
Community Development	Sheal Mulyata	28 October 2026	Incumbent
Culture and Arts	Christopher Chibuye	28 October 2026	Incumbent
Defence	Ambrose Lufuma	28 October 2026	Incumbent
Education	Harry Kamboni	28 October 2026	Incumbent
Electricity	Peter Kapala	28 October 2026	Incumbent
Finance and National Planning	Situmbeko Musokotwane	14 September 2026	Incumbent
Foreign Affairs and International Cooperation	Mulambo Haimbe	14 September 2026	Incumbent
Green Economy and Environment	Gilbert Siame	14 September 2026	Incumbent
Health	Roma Chilengi	14 September 2026	Incumbent
Home Affairs	Clement Andeleki	28 October 2026	Incumbent
Industry	Noel Nkoma	28 October 2026	Incumbent
Information and Media	Elvis Nkandu	28 October 2026	Incumbent
Infrastructure	Collins Nzovu	28 October 2026	Incumbent
Justice	Jack Mwiimbu	28 October 2026	Incumbent
Lands	Patrick Mucheleka	28 October 2026	Incumbent
Labour and Social Security	Misheck Nyambose	28 October 2026	Incumbent
Local Government	Gift Sialubalo	28 October 2026	Incumbent
Livestock	Olive Chiboola	28 October 2026	Incumbent
Mines	Brenda Tambatamaba	28 October 2026	Incumbent
Petroleum	Makozo Chikote	28 October 2026	Incumbent
Skills and Higher Education	Douglas Syakalima	28 October 2026	Incumbent
Small and Medium Enterprise	Lackson Sichone	28 October 2026	Incumbent
Technology and Science	Felix Mutati	28 October 2026	Incumbent
Trade and Exports	Caroline Katotobwe	28 October 2026	Incumbent
Tourism	Princess Kasune	28 October 2026	Incumbent
Water Development and Sanitation	Elisha Matambo	28 October 2026	Incumbent
Youth and Sports	Likando Mufalali	28 October 2026	Incumbent

== Notable Policies and Reforms ==
- Launch and establishment of the Grow Zambia Agenda.

== See also ==
- Hakainde Hichilema
- United Party for National Development
- Politics of Zambia
- 2026 Zambian general election
