= Cabinet of Zambia =

Cabinet of the National government of the Republic of Zambia

- Coat of arms of Zambia

Overview
- Established: 1964
- Country: Zambia
- Leader: President
- Appointed by: Hakainde Hichilema
- Ministries: 24
- Responsible to: President of Zambia
- Headquarters: State House, Lusaka

The Cabinet of Zambia is the executive body of the government of Zambia, responsible for the administration and implementation of national policies and laws. Comprising ministers appointed by the President, the Cabinet advises the President on key issues and oversees various government departments and ministries. The Cabinet is led by the President and includes the Vice-President, who assists in coordinating government activities and representing the President in their absence. Each minister is responsible for a specific portfolio, such as health, education, or finance. Currently the Cabinet operates under the presidency of Hakainde Hichilema, who assumed office on August 24, 2021. The Cabinet plays a crucial role in shaping the country’s legislative agenda and ensuring effective governance.

== Current Cabinet ==
As of October 2026.

The Current Cabinet Ministers
| Incumbent | Office | Term began |
|---|---|---|
| Elvis Nkandu | Minister – Information and Media | 28 October 2026 |
| Mulambo Haimbe | Minister – Foreign Affairs and International Cooperation | 14 September 2026 |
| Gilbert Siame | Minister – Green Economy and Environment | 14 September 2026 |
| Brenda Tambatamba | Minister – Mines and Minerals Development | 28 October 2026 |
| Caroline Katotobwe | Minister – Trade and Exports | 28 October 2026 |
| Charles Milupi | Minister – Transport and Logistics | 29 October 2026 |
| Moses Moyo | Minister – Agriculture | 28 October 2026 |
| Douglas Munsaka Syakalima | Minister – Skills and Higher Education | 28 October 2026 |
| Roma Chilengi | Minister – Health | 14 September 2026 |
| Elisha Matambo | Minister – Water Development and Sanitation | 28 October 2026 |
| Likando Mufalali | Minister – Youth and Sports | 28 October 2026 |
| Patrick Mucheleka | Minister – Lands and Natural Resources | 28 October 2026 |
| Ambrose Lwiji Lufuma | Minister – Defence | 28 October 2026 |
| Misheck Nyambose | Minister – Labour and Social Security | 28 October 2026 |
| Princess Kasune | Minister – Tourism | 28 October 2026 |
| Clement Andeleki | Minister – Home Affairs and Internal Security | 28 October 2026 |
| Situmbeko Musokotwane | Minister – Finance and National Planning | 14 September 2026 |
| Gift Sialubalo | Minister – Local Government and Rural Development | 28 October 2026 |
| Makozo Chikote | Minister – Petroleum | 28 October 2026 |
| Olive Chiboola | Minister – Fisheries and Livestock | 28 October 2026 |
| Sheal Mulyata | Minister – Community Development and Social Services | 28 October 2026 |
| Collins Nzovu | Minister – Infrastructure and Urban Development | 28 October 2026 |
| Felix C Mutati | Minister – Technology and Science | 28 October 2026 |
| Lucky Sichone | Minister – Small and Medium Enterprises Development | 28 October 2026 |
| Jack Mwiimbu | Minister – Justice | 28 October 2026 |
| Harry Kamboni | Minister – Education | 28 October 2026 |
| Peter Kapala | Minister – Electricity | 28 October 2026 |
| Noel Nkhoma | Minister – Industry | 28 October 2026 |
| Christopher Chibuye | Minister – Culture and Arts | 28 October 2026 |
| Christopher Kalila | Minister – Housing | 29 October 2026 |

== See also ==
- Politics of Zambia
- National Assembly of Zambia
