= List of protected conservation areas in Zambia =

The protected conservation areas in the Republic of Zambia include a variety of conservation areas that are critical for preserving the country's unique wildlife and natural resources.

== Types of areas protected by legislation ==
=== The Wildlife Act ===
The overarching legislation covering wildlife conservation is the Zambia Wildlife Act 2015. This provides for the protection of animals in protected area but the Minister may also declare certain animals (e.g. rhinoceros) to be protected everywhere in the country, regardless of area.

Hunting of 'game or protected' animals even in unprotected areas ('open' areas) requires a licence, and trapping is generally banned everywhere. Game animals are listed in the act.

The two most important, both managed by the Department of National Parks and Wildlife under the Wildlife Act are:

- national parks, IUCN Category II, with the strongest protection including no hunting, fishing or resource gathering, and no settlements, and entry only by payment of entry fees or other authorisation.
- game management areas, IUCN Category VI, with hunting, fishing and resource gathering subject to regulation, and settlements permitted but generally with some regulation, sometimes by traditional rulers.

In some cases the management is in partnership with private companies and foundations, or with other public entities such as Community Resource Boards or local chieftanships, or international organizations. The effectiveness of wildlife protection in a GMA therefore depends on the community.

Other types of conservation areas in Zambia under the Wildlife Act are:

- bird or wildlife sanctuary
- private wildlife estate, which may be called wildlife or nature parks/reserves, generally set up with DNPW partenrship or agreement
- Community Partnership Park, set up with community boards and/or in partnership with traditional rulers.

Protected areas in Zambia total 311,773 km^{2}, or 38% of the country's land area. Several of the country's protected areas have been internationally designated as World Heritage Sites or biosphere reserves by UNESCO.

=== Other legislation and types of areas ===
There is other legislation in Zambia which may provide a measure of protection over some other areas, managed by other government departments:

- The Forests Act 2015 administered by the Department of Forestry, now part of the Ministry of Green Economy and Environment, provides for Forest reserves with these sub-categories of protected forest:
  - National forests
  - Local forests
  - Community forests, set up with participation of community boards and/or traditional rulers
  - Botanical Reserves
  - Joint Forest Management Areas.
- The Fisheries Act No. 22 of 2011 administered by the Department of Fisheries, part of the Ministry of Fisheries and Livestock, regulates fishing especially by commercial fisheries.
- The National Heritage Conservation Commission Act 1989 designates natural monuments (IUCN Category III) as areas of special scenic, geological, ecological or scientific interest, protected under the Act. They are administered as National Monuments by the National Heritage Conservation Commission (NHCC).

Protected areas under the Forests and Fisheries Acts are not listed in this article.

=== Total wildlife, forest and natural monuments protected areas ===
The United Nations Environment Programme's World Conservation Monitoring Centre (UNEP-WCMC) gives the following 2026 data for Zambia's areas protected under the Wildlife, Forestry and NHCC Acts:

- Number of protected sites: 631
- Total protected area: 309,922 km^{2} (41.27% coverage)
- National Parks: 20
- Game Management Areas: 36
- Wildlife Sanctuaries: 2
- Bird Sanctuaries: 2
- Forest Reserves: 555
- Natural Monuments: 16

== National parks (IUCN category II) ==
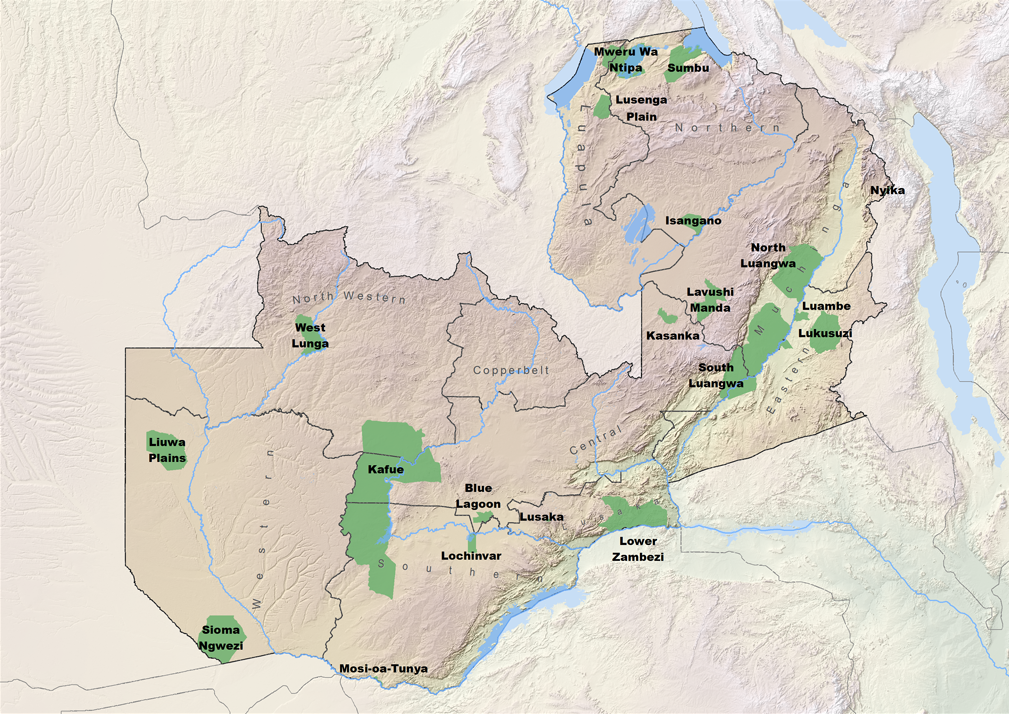
Map showing location of the twenty National Parks of Zambia (Sumbu = Nsumbu)

Zambia's 20 national parks are IUCN category II. Two of them are on the IUCN Green list as shown in the table.

Lodges in the table include luxury camps (tented lodges) and chalets, of international standard.

| Name | Prov. | Area km^{2} | 2023 visitors | Lodges etc. | Green list | Notes |
|---|---|---|---|---|---|---|
| Blue Lagoon NP | C | 450 | – | – (Note: Basic self-catering chalet or self-camping) | | Kafue lechwe herds and good birdlife, on Kafue Flats. |
| Isangano NP | N | 840 | – | – | | In Bangweulu wetlands, degraded, illegal settlements, but good birdlife. |
| Kafue NP (Note: Includes Busanga Swamps) | C,S,NW | 22,400 | 16,722 | 20 | | Huge park with much wildlife; being upgraded in partnership with African Parks |
| Kasanka NP | C | 390 | 1112 | 2 | | Partnership with Kasanka Trust Ltd |
| Lavushi Manda NP | N | 1500 | – | – | | Few game animals, good birdlife; camping, hiking and kayaking possible |
| Liuwa Plain NP | W | 3660 | 659 | 1 | | Partnership with African Parks, restocked, with a new lodge and improved access |
| Lochinvar NP | S | 410 | 2827 | – | | Edge of Kafue Flats. Self-camping only. Good birdlife. Kafue Lechwe herds. |
| Lower Zambezi NP | Lus | 4092 | 9735 | 18 | | Scenic, remote and unspoiled but with good facilities |
| Luambe NP | E | 254 | 45 | 2 | | In the Luangwa Valley, similar wildlife to South Luangwa |
| Lukusuzi NP | E | 2720 | 176 | – | | No facilities, wildlife status not known, transfrontier conservation agreement with Malawi's Kasungu NP |
| Lusaka NP | Lus | 50 | 13,047 | – (Note: Within easy reach of hotels in the city) | | Small fenced city-adjacent park with elephant orphanage; self-camping site. |
| Lusenga Plain NP | Lua | 880 | – | – (Note: Basic accommodation available in Kawambwa) | | Recently revived but self-camping only |
| Mosi-oa-Tunya NP | S | 66 | 13,618 | – (Note: 30 hotels and lodges in the vicinity) | | Zambia's Victoria Falls park at Livingstone, with separate wildlife park and Falls area. |
| Mweru Wantipa NP | N | 3134 | – | – | | No facilities, neglected, wildlife status not known, good birdlife |
| North Luangwa NP | M | 4636 | 2218 | 6 | Yes | Partnership with Frankfurt Zoological Society |
| Nsumbu NP (Note: Includes Kasaba Bay which awaits redevelopment) | N | 2063 | 4522 | 1 (Note: Plus 1 lodge outside the Park) | Yes | Also called Sumbu, on Lake Tanganyika; recently revived in partnership with Frankfurt Zoological Society |
| Nyika NP (Note: Accessible from Malawi's Nyika National Park) | M | 80 | – | – | | No facilities, neglected, wildlife status not known, Nyika plateau scenery |
| Sioma Ngwezi NP | W | 5276 | 216 | – | | Elephant and wildebeest migration route. |
| South Luangwa NP | E,M | 9050 | 28,302 | 28 | | Zambia's premier wildlife park, famous for walking safaris and luxury lodges |
| West Lunga NP | NW | 1684 | 118 | – | | Remote forested park with depleted wildlife. Partnership between Community and DNPW. |

Provinces: C Central, E Eastern, Lus Lusaka, Lua Luapula, M Muchinga, N Northern, NW Northwestern, S Southern, W Western.

Additional notes

=== Administration ===
The national parks are administered by the Department of National Parks and Wildlife, part of the Ministry of Tourism. Zambia's economic and financial downturn in the 1980s resulted in a lack of funds for conservation management and anti-poaching measures, as well as for Park infrastructure and staff. The austerity and privatisation era of the 1990s did not yield quick results, but there has been improvement in the economy and recovery in the tourism sector since. The goals laid out in the 2018–2038 Tourism Master Plan are to increase tourism's contribution to Zambia's economy, targeting growth in revenue from US$562.9 million to US$3.8 billion, and growth in employment, by 2038. The vision is for Zambia to be among Africa's top holiday destinations and a regional conference hub, with the National Parks as the key drawcard.

Protection of national parks and wildlife is government policy in Zambia. Public-Private Partnerships (PPP) in the development of visitor facilities in national parks is seen as a preferred option where reliable partners can be found, and community engagement is now seen as a key to reducing poaching and encroachment by illegal settlement and subsistence farming, hunting and fishing in national parks. Community engagement includes education of the public, community sensitisation to aspects of wildlife ecology to reduce wildlife-human conflicts, given that elephant, lion, hippotamus, crocodile and buffalo populations in particular can pose a threat to villagers and their crops. Examples of these aspects are included in the Nsumbu and Isangano articles in particular.

==== Status of the National Parks ====
Of 20 parks, five have never had management or facilities and have little wildlife apart from birds: Isangano, Lavushi Manda, Lusenga Plain, West Lunga, and Mweru Wantipa. They have scope for improvement to wildlife numbers and facilities, with the possible exception of Isangano due to its intractable human encroachment problem.

Four have substantial wildlife and are being opened up with new lodges: North Luangwa, Luambe, Liuwa Plain and Sioma Ngwezi. Nsumbu in 2026 showed a recovery in wildlife numbers, and the Kasaba Bay resort in that park is awaiting redevelopment to restore the Park to its former glory. These five have the potential to join South Luangwa, Lower Zambezi, Kafue and Kasanka as the best-managed and equipped parks.

Two small parks, Blue Lagoon and Lochinvar, are in need of improved management and accommodation facilities to restore them to previous standard.

Two parks are small fenced areas adjacent to cities, popular for day trip outings, and with scope for improved wildlife resources: Lusaka and Mosi-oa-Tunya.

Lukusuzi and Nyika are remote and undeveloped with wildlife status not clear. Both have transfrontier agreements with larger, more developed Malawian national parks, Kasungu and Nyika (Malawi) and their future may depend on joint conservation and ease of access to the Malawian Parks' facilities.

== Private wildlife estate ==
- Munyamadzi Game Reserve—privately owned game reserve in the Lower Luangwa Valley

== Game Management Areas (GMAs) – IUCN IV ==
GMAs are IUCN Category VI. listed by province — some are shared, as noted. The standard of management of land use and enforcement of conservation regulations is highly variable. Those with strong Community Resource Boards including traditional rulers appear to do well, and the involvement of an international conservation organisation also helps. Bangweulu GMA is a stand-out in this regard.

=== Central Province ===
- Chisomo GMA — 3,390 km^{2}
- Kafinda GMA — 3,860 km^{2}
- Luano GMA — 8,930 km^{2} (shared with Central Province)
- Lunga Luswishi GMA — 13,340 km^{2} (shared with North-Western and Copperbelt provinces)
- Mumbwa GMA — 3,600 km^{2}

=== Copperbelt Province ===
- Lunga Luswishi GMA — 13,340 km^{2} (shared with North-Western and Central provinces)
- Machiya Fungulwa GMA — 1,530 km^{2}

=== Eastern Province ===
- Lumimba GMA — 4,500 km^{2}
- Lupande GMA — 4,840 km^{2}
- Sandwe GMA — 1,530 km^{2}
- West Petauke GMA — 4,140 km^{2}

=== Luapula Province ===
- Bangweulu GMA — 6,470 km^{2} (shared with Muchinga Province)
- Kalasa Mukoso GMA — 675 km^{2}
- Mansa GMA — 2,070 km^{2}

=== Lusaka Province ===
- Chiawa GMA — 2,344 km^{2}
- Luano GMA — 8,930 km^{2} (shared with Central Province)
- Rufunsa GMA — 3,170 km^{2}

=== Muchinga Province ===
- Bangweulu GMA — 6,470 km^{2} (shared with Luapula Province)
- Mukungule GMA — 1,900 km^{2}
- Munyamadzi GMA — 3,300 km^{2}

=== Northern Province ===
- Chambeshi GMA — 620 km^{2}
- Inangu GMA — 43 km^{2}
- Kaputa GMA — 3,600 km^{2}
- Luwingu GMA — 1,090 km^{2}
- Tondwa GMA — 540 km^{2}

=== North-Western Province ===
- Chibwika Ntambu GMA — 1,550 km^{2}
- Chizera GMA — 2,280 km^{2}
- Kasonso Busanga GMA — 7,780 km^{2}
- Lukwakwa GMA — 2,540 km^{2}
- Lunga Luswishi GMA — 13,340 km^{2} (shared with Copperbelt and Central provinces)
- Musele Matebo GMA — 3,700 km^{2}

=== Southern Province ===
- Bilili Springs GMA — 3,080 km^{2}
- Kafue Flats GMA — 5,175 km^{2} (shared with Central Province)
- Namwala GMA — 3,420 km^{2}
- Nkala GMA — 194 km^{2}
- Sichifulo GMA — 3,600 km^{2}

=== Western Province ===
- Kasonso Busanga GMA — 7,780 km^{2}
- Mufunta GMA — 5,104 km^{2}
- Mulobezi GMA — 3,430 km^{2}
- Sichifulo GMA — 3,600 km^{2} †*
- West Zambezi GMA — 38,070 km^{2}

== Community Partnership Parks ==
- Chilongozi Community Resource Board Wildlife Reserve
- Chitambo Community Resource Board Wildlife Reserve
- Kafue Flats Community Resource Board Wildlife Reserve
- Kasanka Trust Community Resource Board Wildlife Reserve
- West Lunga National Park Community Resource Board Wildlife Reserve

=== Bird Sanctuary ===
- Chembe Bird Sanctuary, Kalulushi, Copperbelt Province

== International designations ==
=== United Nations Environment Programme (UNEP) ===
UNEP administers the World Conservation Monitoring Centre (UNEP-WCMC) which maintains reports and databases on conservation worldwide. It also publishes the https://www.protectedplanet.net/ website and evaluates effectiveness of conservation management for particular sites. The Zambia page has 23 sites which have been evaluated.

=== International Union for Conservation of Nature (IUCN) ===
On December 12, 2022, in Montreal, Canada, the IUCN admitted Zambia to the IUCN Green List of Protected and Conserved Areas, the global standard recognizing well-governed and effectively managed sites on the planet. Zambia's North Luangwa National Park was recognized as Zambia's first Green List site. It is managed by the Frankfurt Zoological Society and the Zambia Department of National Parks and Wildlife and is known for its black rhino and African elephant populations. The park is also home to one of the ten remaining African lion strongholds.

=== UNESCO biosphere reserves ===
- Kafue Biosphere Reserve - 22,480 km^{2}

=== World Heritage Sites ===
- Mosi-oa-Tunya / Victoria Falls 686,000 hectares
