= Mathew Nkhuwa =

Zambian engineer, politician and former Cabinet minister

Member of the National Assembly for Chingola
- In office 11 August 2016 – 11 August 2021
- President: Edgar Lungu
- Preceded by: Joseph Katema
- Succeeded by: Chipoka Mulenga

Minister of Energy
- In office 14 February 2018 – 14 May 2021
- President: Edgar Lungu
- Preceded by: David Mabumba
- Succeeded by: Peter Kapala

Minister of Works and Supply
- In office 31 October 2016 – 14 February 2018
- President: Edgar Lungu
- Preceded by: Ronald Chitotela
- Succeeded by: Felix Mutati

Personal details
- Born: January 29, 1954 (age 71) Zambia
- Party: Patriotic Front
- Education: B.A. in Project Management; Automotive mechanic training
- Profession: Engineer · Politician

Mathew Nkhuwa (born 29 January 1954) is a Zambian engineer and politician. A member of the Patriotic Front, he represented Chingola Constituency in the National Assembly of Zambia from 2016 to 2021. He served as Minister of Works and Supply (2016–2018) and later as Minister of Energy (2018–2021).

== Early life and education ==
Nkhuwa trained initially as an automotive mechanic and later earned a Bachelor of Arts in Project Management. He worked as an engineer before entering politics.

== Political and ministerial career ==
He was elected to Parliament on 11 August 2016 in Chingola constituency as the Patriotic Front candidate. Nkhuwa was appointed Minister of Works and Supply on 31 October 2016 by President Edgar Lungu.

On 14 February 2018, he was transferred to being the Minister of Energy, succeeding David Mabumba. He remained in that role until May 2021.

During his ministerial tenure, he oversaw energy projects and encouraged the use of the Presidential Empowerment Initiative Fund to support marketeers in Chingola constituency, stating that the program was non‑discriminatory. He also supported infrastructure development, including police housing and road projects delivered by Chinese contractors.

== Controversies ==
In 2019, opposition leader Chishimba Kambwili called for Nkhuwa’s resignation over severe load shedding in Zambia, criticizing his handling of the energy sector.

== See also ==
- Ministry of Energy (Zambia)
- Cabinet of Zambia
