= Office of the Vice President =

The Office of the Vice President may refer to:

- Office of the Vice President of the United States
- Office of the Vice President of the Philippines
- Office of the Vice-President (Zambia)
