= Kampamba Mulenga =

Zambian politician

Member of the National Assembly for Kalulushi
- Incumbent
- Assumed office August 2016
- Preceded by: Rayford Mbulu

Minister of Information and Broadcasting Services
- In office November 2016 – February 2018
- President: Edgar Lungu
- Preceded by: Chishimba Kambwili
- Succeeded by: Dora Siliya

Minister of Fisheries and Livestock
- In office February 2018 – 19 July 2019
- President: Edgar Lungu
- Preceded by: Micheal Zondani Katambo
- Succeeded by: Nkandu Luo

Minister of Community Development and Social Welfare
- In office 20 July 2019 – August 2021
- President: Edgar Lungu
- Preceded by: Olipa Phiri
- Succeeded by: Doreen Mwamba

Personal details
- Born: 3 March 1976 (age 50) Zambia
- Party: Patriotic Front (2016 - 2026); UPND (2026 to present)

Kampamba Mulenga (born 3 March 1976) is a Zambian politician and a member of the United Party for National Development. She is currently the member of parliament for Kalulushi constituency. She served as the Minister of Information and Broadcasting Services, Minister of Fisheries and Livestock and Minister of Community Development and Social Welfare during the presidency of Edgar Lungu (2016 to 2021).

== Education ==
She holds Advanced Certificate in Health Care and Advanced Certificate in IT.

== Career ==
Kampamba Mulenga worked as a health care provider after training in health care and information technology. At the 2016 general election, she stood as the Patriotic Front candidate for Kalulushi constituency and won the parliamentary seat. In November 2016, she was appointed by President Edgar Lungu as Minister of Information and Broadcasting Services in his Cabinet. In February 2018, she was appointed as the Minister of Fisheries and Livestock. In July 2019, she was appointed as the Minister of Community Development and Social Services. She retained her parliamentary seat in Kalulushi at the 2021 general election.

In April 2026, Mulenga had switched her allegiance to the United Party for National Development and the following month, she was chosen to be the party's MP candidate in Kalulushi constituency at the 2026 general election. She was re-elected as the Kalulushi MP at the election on 13 August 2026.

== Personal life ==
She is married to Kizito Chewe.
