= Luampa East =

National Assembly constituency in Zambia

Luampa East is a constituency of the National Assembly of Zambia. It was created in 2026 when Luampa constituency was split into two constituencies (Luampa West and Luampa East). It covers the eastern part of Luampa District.

== List of MPs ==
Election year	MP	Party
2026	Makozo Chikote	United Party for National Development
