= Vincent Mwale =

Zambian politician and former minister of infrastructure and local government

Member of the National Assembly for Chipangali West
- Incumbent
- Assumed office August 2026

Member of the National Assembly for Chipangali
- In office September 2006 – August 2021
- Preceded by: Lucas Phiri
- Succeeded by: Andrew Lubusha

Minister of Housing and Infrastructure Development
- In office 20 July 2019 – May 2021
- President: Edgar Lungu
- Preceded by: Ronald Chitotela
- Succeeded by: Charles Milupi

Minister of Local Government
- In office 27 September 2016 – 19 July 2019
- President: Edgar Lungu
- Preceded by: John Phiri
- Succeeded by: Charles Banda

Personal details
- Born: 5 December 1978 (age 47) Zambia
- Party: Movement for Multi-Party Democracy (2006 - 2016); Patriotic Front (2016 - 2021)
- Education: Bachelor of arts in Development Studies
- Profession: Entrepreneur · Politician

Vincent Mwale (born 5 December 1978) is a Zambian politician who currently serves as the member of parliament for Chipangali West. He previously represented Chipangali Constituency in the National Assembly of Zambia from 2006 to 2021. He served as the Minister of Youth and Sports from February 2015 to May 2016, as the Minister of Local Government and Rural Development from September 2016 to July 2019 and as the Minister of Housing and Infrastructure Development from July 2019 to May 2021 in the cabinet of President Edgar Lungu.

== Career ==
Mwale was elected MP for Chipangali constituency in two consecutive elections (2006 and 2011) as the Movement for Multi-Party Democracy (MMD) candidate. After Edgar Lungu of the Patriotic Front (PF) won the 2015 presidential by-election, he appointed Mwale as the Minister of Youth and Sports in February 2015. Mwale then officially left the MMD to join the PF.

He stood as the PF candidate in Chipangali constituency at the 2016 general election and was re-elected. President Lungu then appointed Mwale as the Minister of Local Government on 27 September 2016. As Local Government Minister, Mwale promoted revenue generation from waste recycling and completed police housing projects across southern districts.

On 19 July 2019, Mwale was transferred to being the Minister of Housing and Infrastructure Development. Ahead of the 2021 general election, the Patriotic Front party decided to choose Andrew Lubusha to contest in Chipangali constituency, therefore denying Mwale the chance to retain his position.

In May 2026, Mwale applied to be an independent candidate for MP in Chipangali West (a section of where he was previously the MP) at the 2026 general election and he was elected in August 2026.

== Notable initiatives ==
Mwale's constituency development included donation of roofing sheets to schools in Eastern Province and freeing up public-owned sports facilities for redevelopment through his foundation.
