= Lufwanyama (constituency) =

Constituency of the National Assembly of Zambia

Lufwanyama was a constituency of the National Assembly of Zambia. It covered a large rural area in the Lufwanyama District of Copperbelt Province, including the town of Lufwanyama.

== List of MPs ==
| Election year | MP | Party |
|---|---|---|
| 1991 | Chobela Mulilo | Movement for Multi-Party Democracy |
| 1996 | Mike Mulongoti | Movement for Multi-Party Democracy |
| 2001 | Goodson Mulilo | Movement for Multi-Party Democracy |
| 2006 | Lwipa Puma | Movement for Multi-Party Democracy |
| 2011 | Annie Munshya | Movement for Multi-Party Democracy |
| 2016 | Leonard Fungulwe | United Party for National Development |
| 2021 | Kenny Siachisumo | United Party for National Development |
Seat abolished (split into Lufwanyama West and Lufwanyama East)
