= Mubanga =

Mubanga is a surname of Zambian origin that may refer to:

- Elias Mubanga (born 1967), Zambian politician
- Hellen Mubanga (born 1995), Zambian footballer
- M. K. Mubanga, Southern African politician
- Martin Mubanga, Zambian extrajudicial prisoner of the United States
- Perry Mubanga, Zambian football defender
