= Mathews Jere =

Zambian politician (born 1976)

Honorable Mathews Jere

Member of the National Assembly of Zambia
- In office August 2016 – 2021
- President: Edgar Lungu
- Preceded by: Evans Lawrence
- Succeeded by: Rodney Sikumba
- Constituency: Livingstone

Personal details
- Born: Mathews Jere; May 8, 1976 (age 50) Livingstone, Zambia
- Party: United Party for National Development

Mathews Jere (born 8 May 1976) is a Zambian politician and businessman who represented Livingstone Constituency in the National Assembly from 2016 to 2021 as a member of the United Party for National Development (UPND).

== Political career ==
Jere was elected Member of Parliament for Livingstone Constituency in the 2016 general election under the United Party for National Development (UPND), receiving 27,737 votes. Patriotic Front candidate Omar Munsanje finished second with 9,990 votes.

Jere's parliamentary term ended in 2021. He was succeeded by Rodney Sikumba, who won the constituency in that year's general election.
