= Luampa (constituency) =

Constituency of the National Assembly of Zambia

Luampa was a constituency of the National Assembly of Zambia. It covered Luampa District in Western Province.

== List of MPs ==
Election year	MP	Party
Luampa
1968	Fine Liboma	United National Independence Party
1973	Mowat Kapata	United National Independence Party
1978	Kakoma Musangu	United National Independence Party
1983	Kakoma Musangu	United National Independence Party
1988	Kakoma Musangu	United National Independence Party
1991	Stephen Manjata	Movement for Multi-Party Democracy
1996	Stephen Manjata	Movement for Multi-Party Democracy
2001	Stephen Manjata	Movement for Multi-Party Democracy
2006	Josephine Limata	United Party for National Development
2011	Josephine Limata	Movement for Multi-Party Democracy
2016	Makozo Chikote	United Party for National Development
2021	Makozo Chikote	United Party for National Development
Seat abolished (split into Luampa West and Luampa East)
