= Emmanuel Kasonde =

Zambian politician

Emmanuel Kasonde (December 23, 1935 – December 12, 2008) was a Zambian economist and politician who served as the Finance permanent secretary or Minister of Finance under three successive Zambian presidential administrations, including Kenneth Kaunda, Frederick Chiluba and Levy Mwanawasa.

== Early life ==
Emmanuel Kasonde was born in Malole Mission particularly in the village called Bwebe and later the family moved and settled Mukosa village in Malole, Northern Rhodesia. He completed his primary school education at Malole Primary School from 1943 to 1950. He next enrolled at St Francis Secondary School. Kasonde continued his education, attending Munali, located in Lusaka, from 1953 to 1956. It is at Mukosa village where he later established one of the biggest farm companies, called Trent farms. This household farm name came to be the biggest name in the product of maize meal and soya beans. The farm is still there under a different management with less activities. He moved from Northern Rhodesia to the United Kingdom in 1958 to study economics.

== Career ==
Kasonde was appointed assistant labour commissioner of Northern Rhodesia upon his return from the United Kingdom.

Kenneth Kaunda, the first president of Zambia, appointed Kasonde as the finance permanent secretary (Minister of Finance) in 1967. He remained at the government post until 1971, when he left to rejoin private sector. He returned to the United Kingdom in 1987 to continue his advanced educational studies.

Kasonde formally entered politics in 1990, when he became Movement for Multi-Party Democracy (MMD) provincial chairman for Northern Province. He was appointed finance minister by President Frederick Chiluba following the victory of Chiluba and the MMD in 1991.

President Levy Mwanawasa also appointed Kasonde as Zambia's finance minister in 2002.

Kasonde retired from active politics in 2003. He continued to work in various positions within the Catholic Church in Zambia following his retirement.

== Death ==
Emmanuel Kasonde died on Friday, December 12, 2008, at Lusaka Trust Hospital in Lusaka at the age of 72. He was survived by his wife, Rose Kasonde, four children and eight grandchildren.

Kasonde's funeral was held at the Roman Catholic Cathedral of the Child Jesus in Lusaka. His funeral mass was presided over by Lusaka Archbishop Telesphore Mpundu, former Lusaka Archbishop Medardo Mazombwe and nine other Catholic priests. the late former Finance Minister Emmanuel Kasonde was to rest at his Trent Farm at Malole (mukosa village) in Mungwi district. In his will, Kasonde said that he did not want anyone to speak about him at his funeral. However, Archbishop Mazombwe, who was a close friend and adviser to Kasonde for thirty years, still spoke of him in his homily. Mazombwe said of Kasonde that, "He was a Catholic inside out. He was dedicated to church affairs, despite the position he held in society, he remained simple and approachable.." He went on to call Kasonde "...a great source of inspiration for us. His soul is a soul of an upright man."

High-profile Zambian heads of state at the funeral mass included former president Kenneth Kaunda and the then defence minister George Mpombo, who represented President Rupiah Banda. Other attendees included former vice president Enoch Kavindele, Home Affairs Minister Kalombo Mwansa and the Speaker of the National Assembly Mutale Nalumango.

The heads of all of Zambia's majority political parties were also in attendance. They included United Party for National Development (UPND) president Hakainde Hichilema, Patriotic Front (PF) president Michael Sata, the then All Peoples Congress Party (APC) president Ken Ngondo. The National Democratic Focus (NDF) was represented by both president Ben Mwila, as well as the NDF former vice president, Nevers Mumba.

Members of the Zambian government, deputy ministers, members of the diplomatic corp, and the business community were also present at Kasonde's funeral.

The Government of Zambia declared the day of Emmanuel Kasonde funeral - December 16, 2008 - as a national day of mourning.
