= Ministry of Fisheries and Livestock =

Ministry of Fisheries and Livestock may refer to:

- Ministry of Fisheries and Livestock (Bangladesh)
- Ministry of Fisheries and Livestock (Zambia)
