= Emmanuel Mulenga =

Zambian politician

Member of the National Assembly for Ndola Central
- In office 2016–2021
- Preceded by: Fackson Shamenda
- Succeeded by: Frank Tayali
- Incumbent
- Assumed office 2016
- Preceded by: Frank Tayali

Minister of Sport, Youth and Child Development
- In office 2019–2021
- President: Edgar Lungu
- Preceded by: Moses Mawere
- Succeeded by: Elvis Nkandu

Personal details
- Born: 26 November 1979 (age 46)
- Party: MMD, Patriotic Front, Resolute Party
- Profession: Businessman

Emmanuel Mulenga (born 26 November 1979) is a Zambian politician who currently serves as the Member of the National Assembly for Ndola Central. He previously held this position between 2016 and 2021, during which he served as Minister of Sport, Youth and Child Development from 2019 to 2021.

== Biography ==
Prior to entering politics Mulenga was a businessman and owned the Easy Mining company. He was chosen as the Movement for Multi-Party Democracy candidate for Ndola Central for the 2011 general elections, but was defeated by Fackson Shamenda of the Patriotic Front. Prior to the 2016 general elections, he was nominated as the Patriotic Front candidate after Shamenda opted not to contest the elections. Mulenga was subsequently elected to the National Assembly with a 12,983 vote majority.

After becoming an MP, Mulenga joined the Committee on Local Government Accounts and the Committee on Agriculture, Lands and Natural Resources. In July 2019 he was appointed Minister of Sport, Youth and Child Development. He was not re-elected as the Ndola Central MP in the 2021 elections, with Frank Tayali winning the seat ahead of him.

Ahead of the 2026 general election, Mulenga was adopted as the Resolute Party candidate for Ndola Central and he was re-elected at the election on 13 August 2026, winning the seat ahead of the incumbent (Frank Tayali).
