= Livingstone Central =

Constituency of the National Assembly of Zambia

Livingstone Central is a constituency of the National Assembly of Zambia. It covers the western part of Livingstone District, including the Livingstone city centre, the neighbourhoods of Elaine Brittell, Highlands, Dambwa North, Dambwa Central, Dambwa Site and Nakatindi and the town of Simonga in Southern Province.

== List of MPs ==
Election year	MP	Party
Livingstone
1964	Mainza Chona	Zambian African National Congress
1968	Jethro Mutti	Zambian African National Congress
1973	Arthur Wina	United National Independence Party
1978	Sebastian Kapalu	United National Independence Party
1983	Enos Haimbe	United National Independence Party
1988	Enos Haimbe	United National Independence Party
1991	Peter Muunga	Movement for Multi-Party Democracy
1996	Munang'angu Hatembo	Movement for Multi-Party Democracy
2001	Sakwiba Sikota	United Party for National Development
2006	Sakwiba Sikota	United Liberal Party
2011	Lukolo Katombora	United Party for National Development
2012 (by-election)	Howard Sikwela	United Party for National Development
2013 (by-election)	Evans Lawrence	Patriotic Front
2016	Mathews Jere	United Party for National Development
2021	Rodney Sikumba	United Party for National Development
Livingstone Central
2026	Gracious Mayangwa	United Party for National Development
