= Chipangali West =

National Assembly constituency in Zambia

Chipangali West is a constituency of the National Assembly of Zambia. It was created in 2026 when Chipangali constituency was split into two constituencies (Chipangali West and Chipangali East). It covers the western part of Chipangali District.

== List of MPs ==
Election year	MP	Party
Chipangali West
2026	Vincent Mwale	Independent
