= Mike Mposha =

Zambian politician

Minister of Water Development and Sanitation
- In office 7 September 2021 – 13 June 2024
- President: Hakainde Hichilema
- Preceded by: Raphael Nakachinda
- Succeeded by: Collins Nzovu

Minister of Green Economy and Environment
- In office 14 June 2024 – 15 May 2026
- Preceded by: Collins Nzovu
- Succeeded by: Gilbert Siame

Member of the National Assembly for Munali
- In office August 2021 – 15 May 2026
- Preceded by: Nkandu Luo
- Succeeded by: Thomas Sipalo

Personal details
- Born: 13 November 1983 (age 42)
- Party: United Party for National Development
- Education: University of Zambia
- Occupation: Politician

Mike Mposha is a Zambian politician who served as the member of parliament for Munali Constituency from 2021 to 2026, during which he served as the Minister of Water Development and Sanitation from 7 September 2021 to 13 June 2024 and Minister of Green Economy and Environment from 13 June 2024 to 15 May 2026. He is a member of the United Party for National Development (UPND).

== Political career ==
Mike Mposha stood as the UPND candidate for MP in Munali constituency of Lusaka District at the 2021 general election on 12 August 2021 and he was elected. The following month, President Hakainde Hichilema appointed him as the Minister of Water Development and Sanitation in the initial cabinet. On 13 June 2024, he was appointed as the Minister of Green Economy and Environment, thereby exchanging ministries with Collins Nzovu.

Ahead of the 2026 general election, Mposha was adopted as the UPND candidate in Malambo East constituency in Mambwe District. At the election, Mposha finished second to Faith Lungu, an independent candidate.
