= John Mwaimba =

Zambian politician

Deputy Minister of Works and Supply
- In office 2006–2006

Deputy Minister of Local Government and Housing
- In office 2004–2006
- Preceded by: Guston Sichilima

Deputy Minister of Information and Broadcasting Services
- In office 2002–2003

Member of the National Assembly for Kapiri Mposhi
- In office 2002–2006
- Preceded by: Macdonald Nkabika
- Succeeded by: Friday Malwa

Personal details
- Born: 30 March 1950 (age 75)
- Died: 29 April 2025 Lusaka
- Political party: Movement for Multi-Party Democracy
- Profession: Businessman

John Mwaimba (born 30 March 1950) is a Zambian politician. He served as Member of the National Assembly for Kapiri Mposhi from 2002 until 2006.

== Biography ==
Prior to entering politics, Mwaimba was a businessman. He contested the Kapiri Mposhi seat as the National Lima Party candidate in the 1996 general elections, but finished in third place. Prior to the 2001 general elections he was chosen as the Movement for Multi-Party Democracy (MMD) candidate and was elected to the National Assembly with a majority of 3,761. Following the elections he was appointed Deputy Minister of Information and Broadcasting Services. However, he was sacked by President Levy Mwanawasa in 2003 after being accused of fraud. In June 2004 he was made Deputy Minister of Local Government and Housing. He was later moved to become Deputy Minister of Works and Supply in 2006.

Mwaimba was not selected as the MMD candidate for the Kapiri Mposhi for the 2006 general elections.
