= Nangoma (constituency) =

Constituency of the National Assembly of Zambia

Nangoma is a constituency of the National Assembly of Zambia. It covers Kasula, Namukumbo and Nangoma in Mumbwa District of Central Province.

== List of MPs ==
Election year	MP	Party
1991	Shimaili David Mpamba	Movement for Multi-Party Democracy
1996	Shimaili David Mpamba	Movement for Multi-Party Democracy
2001	Kennedy Shepande	United Party for National Development
2006	Boyd Hamusonde	United Democratic Alliance
2011	Boyd Hamusonde	United Party for National Development
2016	Boyd Hamusonde	Independent
2021	Collins Nzovu	United Party for National Development
2026	Collins Nzovu	United Party for National Development
