= Eddie Musonda =

Zambian politician

Member of the National Assembly for Kapiri Mposhi
- In office 2013–2016
- Preceded by: Lawrence Zimba
- Succeeded by: Stanley Kakubo

Personal details
- Born: 27 March 1956 (age 68)
- Political party: Patriotic Front

Eddie Musonda (born 27 March 1956) is a Zambian politician. He served as Member of the National Assembly for Kapiri Mposhi from 2013 until 2016.

== Biography ==
Musonda studied for a BA in Public Administration and Political Sciences, and also gained qualifications in personnel and health management. He contested the Kapiri Mposhi seat as the Patriotic Front candidate in the 2011 general elections, but was defeated by Lawrence Zimba of the Movement for Multi-Party Democracy by a margin of 7,000 votes. However, Musonda successfully challenged the result in the Supreme Court, resulting in a by-election on 23 April 2013. Musonda emerged as the winner and became a member of the National Assembly.

As an MP, Musonda joined the Committee on Education, Science and Technology in January 2015. He was not selected as the Patriotic Front candidate for Kapiri Mposhi for the 2016 general elections, which saw the seat won by Stanley Kakubo of the United Party for National Development.
