= Kalulushi (constituency) =

Constituency of the National Assembly of Zambia

Kalulushi is a constituency of the National Assembly of Zambia. It covers the towns of Kalulushi and Chibuluma in Kalulushi District of Copperbelt Province.

The constituency was created in 1968 when Luanshya–Kalulushi was split in two.

== List of MPs ==
Election year	MP	Party
1968	Frank Chitambala	United National Independence Party
1970 (by-election)	Alexander Chikwanda	United National Independence Party
1973	Alexander Chikwanda	United National Independence Party
1978	Webster Lamba	United National Independence Party
1983	Webster Lamba	United National Independence Party
1988	Bonard Sekwila	United National Independence Party
1991	Bornad Sekwila	Movement for Multi-Party Democracy
1996	Elizabeth Chipampata	Movement for Multi-Party Democracy
2001	Chitalu Sampa	Movement for Multi-Party Democracy
2006	Anson Simama	Patriotic Front
2011	Rayford Mbulu	Patriotic Front
2016	Kampamba Mulenga	Patriotic Front
2021	Kampamba Mulenga	Patriotic Front
2026	Kampamba Mulenga	United Party for National Development
