= Lunte =

Constituency of the National Assembly of Zambia

Lunte is a constituency of the National Assembly of Zambia. It covers the towns of Chitoshi, Kapatu and Mukupa in Lunte District of Northern Province.

== List of MPs ==
Election year	MP	Party
1991	Chilufya Kapwepwe	Movement for Multi-Party Democracy
1994 (by-election)	Donald Musonda	Movement for Multi-Party Democracy
1996	Dominic Musonda	Movement for Multi-Party Democracy
2001	Felix Mutati	Movement for Multi-Party Democracy
2006	Felix Mutati	Movement for Multi-Party Democracy
2011	Felix Mutati	Movement for Multi-Party Democracy
2016	Mutotwe Kafwaya	Patriotic Front
2021	Mutotwe Kafwaya	Patriotic Front
