= Luampa West =

National Assembly constituency in Zambia

Luampa West is a constituency of the National Assembly of Zambia. It was created in 2026 when Luampa constituency was split into two constituencies (Luampa West and Luampa East). It covers the western part of Luampa District.

== List of MPs ==
| Election year | MP | Party |
|---|---|---|
| 2026 | Chinyama Sachiyenge | United Party for National Development |
