= Friday Malwa =

Zambian politician (born 1952)

Deputy Minister of Community Development and Social Welfare
- In office 2008–2011

Deputy Minister in the Office of the Vice-President
- In office 2007–2008

Deputy Minister of Energy and Water Development
- In office 2006–2007

Member of the National Assembly for Kapiri Mposhi
- In office 2006–2011
- Preceded by: John Mwaimba
- Succeeded by: Lawrence Zimba

Personal details
- Born: 28 September 1952 (age 73)
- Party: MMD, PF, UPND
- Profession: Salesman

Chipepo Peter Friday Malwa (born 28 September 1952) is a Zambian politician. He served as Member of the National Assembly for Kapiri Mposhi from 2006 until 2011.

== Biography ==
Prior to entering politics, Malwa worked as a General Manager for several Zambian Breweries Depots in the Copperbelt, Northern and Western Province and Lusaka. Mr Malwa Also did a leadership program at Harvard University in the USA. He contested the Kapiri Mposhi seat as the Movement for Multi-Party Democracy (MMD) candidate in the 2006 general elections and was elected with a majority of 18,000. Following the elections he was appointed Deputy Minister of Energy and Water Development. In 2007 he was moved to the Deputy Minister in the Office of the Vice-President.

In 2008 Malwa became Deputy Minister of Community Development and Social Welfare. However, he was not selected as the MMD candidate for Kapiri Mposhi for the 2011 general elections, later claiming this was because he had refused to bribe party officials. In 2012 he left the MMD to join the Patriotic Front (PF). He then moved to the United Party for National Development (UPND) in 2016 after failing to become the PF candidate in the 2016 general elections. However, after also failing to gain the UPND nomination for Kapiri Mposhi, he returned to the PF.
