= Alliance for Democracy and Development (Zambia) =

Political party in Zambia

The Alliance for Democracy and Development (ADD) is a political party in Zambia.

== History ==
The party was established on 14 May 2010 by independent MP Charles Milupi. As he had changed party affiliation, Milupi was required to stand down as an MP, resulting in a by-election in which he was re-elected, retaining the seat until the term finished in 2011. He was the party's presidential candidate for the 2011 general elections; he finished fourth in a field of ten candidates with 0.9% of the vote. In the elections to the National Assembly the party received 1.2% of the vote, winning a single seat; its candidate Mwambwa Imenda won Milupi's former Luena constituency.

In 2018, the ADD was one of 10 political parties that decided to form the Opposition Alliance, with ADD president Charles Milupi as the chairperson of the alliance. In February 2021, 5 and a half months before the 2021 general election, the Opposition Alliance was rebranded as the UPND Alliance and Milupi remained as the chairperson of the alliance. The alliance members decided to endorse Hakainde Hichilema of the UPND as their sole presidential candidate. After the UPND won that election in August 2021, Charles Milupi was appointed as the Minister of Infrastructure, Housing and Urban Development the following month and is therefore a nominated a member of parliament.

Ahead of the 2026 general election, Charles Milupi, as the UPND Alliance chairperson, among other alliance members endorsed Hichilema for re-election and therefore the ADD would not participate in that election.
