= Kapiri Mposhi West =

National Assembly constituency in Zambia

Kapiri Mposhi West is a constituency of the National Assembly of Zambia. It was created in 2026 when Kapiri Mposhi constituency was split into two constituencies (Kapiri Mposhi West and Kapiri Mposhi East). It covers the western part of Kapiri Mposhi District.

== List of MPs ==
Election year	MP	Party
Kapiri Mposhi West
2026	Stanley Kakubo	United Party for National Development
