= Department of National Parks and Wildlife of Zambia =

Zambian government department under the Ministry of Tourism

Department of National Parks and Wildlife
Agency overview
- Formed: 2015
- Preceding agency: Zambia Wildlife Authority
- Headquarters: Chilanga, Zambia
- Agency executive: Director General
- Website: https://www.mot.gov.zm/dnpw

The Department of National Parks and Wildlife of Zambia was created by Act of Parliament as a department of the Ministry of Tourism in 2015. The same act also wound up the department's predecessor, the Zambia Wildlife Authority (ZAWA).

The aims of the department are to protect and conserve Zambia's wildlife and to improve the quality of the life among communities in the wildlife estates. The department also aims to sustain biodiversity in national parks and game management areas, comprising 20 National Parks, 36 Game Management Areas and one bird sanctuary, which cover 30 percent of the country’s land mass.

The national parks are administered by the Department of National Parks and Wildlife, part of the Ministry of Tourism. Zambia’s economic and financial downturn in the 1980s resulted in a lack of funds for conservation management and anti-poaching measures, as well as for Park infrastructure and staff. The austerity and privatisation era of the 1990s did not yield quick results, but there has been improvement in the economy and recovery in the tourism sector since. The goals laid out in the 2018–2038 Tourism Master Plan are to increase tourism's contribution to Zambia’s economy, targeting growth in revenue from US$562.9 million to US$3.8 billion, and growth in employment, by 2038. The vision is for Zambia to be among Africa’s top holiday destinations and a regional conference hub, with the National Parks as the key drawcard.

Protection of national parks and wildlife is government policy in Zambia. Public-Private Partnerships (PPP) in the development of visitor facilities in national parks is seen as a preferred option where reliable partners can be found, and community engagement is now seen as a key to reducing poaching and encroachment by illegal settlement and subsistence farming, hunting and fishing in national parks. Community engagement includes education of the public, community sensitisation to aspects of wildlife ecology to reduce wildlife-human conflicts, given that elephant, lion, hippotamus, crocodile and buffalo populations in particular can pose a threat to villagers and their crops. Examples of these aspects are included in the Nsumbu and Isangano articles in particular.

== See also ==
- List of protected areas in Zambia
