= Lufwanyama West =

National Assembly constituency in Zambia

Lufwanyama West is a constituency of the National Assembly of Zambia. It was created in 2026 when Lufwanyama constituency was split into two constituencies (Lufwanyama West and Lufwanyama East). It covers the western part of Lufwanyama District.

== List of MPs ==
Election year	MP	Party
2026	Kenny Siachisumo	United Party for National Development
