= Luena (constituency) =

Constituency of the National Assembly of Zambia

Luena is a constituency of the National Assembly of Zambia. It covers Limulunga District in Western Province, including the town of Limulunga.

== List of MPs ==
Election year	MP	Party
Luena
1973	Mufaya Mumbuna	United National Independence Party
Luena Flats
1978	Mufaya Mumbuna	United National Independence Party
Luena
1983	Davison Muttendango	United National Independence Party
1988	Chrispin Sibetta	United National Independence Party
1991	Mubukwanu Kunyanda	Movement for Multi-Party Democracy
1996	Chrispin Sibetta	Independent
2001	Chrispin Sibetta	United Party for National Development
2006	Charles Milupi	Independent
2010 (by-election)	Charles Milupi	Alliance for Democracy and Development
2011	Mwambwa Imenda	Alliance for Democracy and Development
2016	David Kundoti	United Party for National Development
2021	Mubita Anakoka	United Party for National Development
2026	Maliti Chimwaso	United Party for National Development
