= Lameck Chibombamilimo =

Zambian politician

Deputy Minister of Energy and Water Development
- In office 2008–2009

Minister for Northern Province
- In office 2006–2008
- President: Levy Mwanawasa
- Preceded by: Clever Silavwe

Member of the National Assembly for Mpulungu
- In office 2006–2010
- Preceded by: Harrigan Mazimba
- Succeeded by: Given Mung'omba

Personal details
- Born: 25 May 1961
- Died: 9 August 2010 (aged 49)
- Party: Movement for Multi-Party Democracy
- Occupation: Teacher

Lameck Kauzi Chibombamilimo (25 May 1961 – 9 August 2010) was a Zambian politician.

== Biography ==
Chibombamilimo worked as a teacher before entering politics. In the 2006 general elections he ran as the Movement for Multi-Party Democracy candidate in Mpulungu and was elected to the National Assembly with 85% of the vote. Later in the year he was appointed Minister for Northern Province. In November 2008 he became Deputy Minister of Energy and Water Development.

However, in February 2009 Chibombamilimo was sacked by President Rupiah Banda after being accused of disloyalty. In 2010 he became critically ill with kidney problems and was flown to New Delhi for a transplant. However, he died on 9 August.
