= Siasiloka Mukuni =

Zambian politician

Honorable Siasiloka Mukuni

Elected member of the National Assembly of Zambia
- Incumbent
- Assumed office August 2026
- President: Hakainde Hichilema
- Constituency: Kazungula South

Personal details
- Born: Siasiloka Mukuni Zambia
- Party: United Party for National Development

Siasiloka Mukuni (born February 12) is a Zambian politician and member of the United Party for National Development (UPND). He represents Kazungula South Constituency in the National Assembly and is the son of traditional leader Chief Mukuni.

== Political career ==
Mukuni contested the 2026 general election as the United Party for National Development (UPND) candidate for Kazungula South. He won the seat with 20,024 votes, while his closest rival, National Reconciliation Party for Unity and Prosperity (NRPUP) candidate Lungisani Banda, received 807 votes. His election made him the first Member of Parliament for the newly established constituency.
