= Lawrence Zimba =

Zambian politician (born 1955)

Member of the National Assembly for Kapiri Mposhi
- In office 2011–2013
- Preceded by: Friday Malwa
- Succeeded by: Eddie Musonda

Personal details
- Born: 22 April 1955 (age 71)
- Party: MMD, UPND
- Profession: Agricultural mechanic

Lawrence Zimba (born 22 April 1955) is a Zambian politician. He served as Member of the National Assembly for Kapiri Mposhi from 2011 until 2013.

== Biography ==
Prior to entering politics, Zimba worked as an agricultural mechanic. He contested the Kapiri Mposhi seat as the Movement for Multi-Party Democracy candidate in the 2011 general elections and was elected with a majority of 7,000. However, defeated Patriotic Front candidate Eddie Musonda successfully challenged the result in the Supreme Court, resulting in a by-election on 23 April 2013. By then Zimba had defected to the United Party for National Development (UPND) and was the UPND candidate in the by-election, losing by a margin of 1,144 votes to Musonda.
