= Lufwanyama East =

National Assembly constituency in Zambia

Lufwanyama East is a constituency of the National Assembly of Zambia. It was created in 2026 when Lufwanyama constituency was split into two constituencies (Lufwanyama West and Lufwanyama East). It covers the eastern part of Lufwanyama District, including the town of Lufwanyama.

== List of MPs ==
Election year	MP	Party
2026	Elisha Matambo	United Party for National Development
