= Trevor Gardner (administrator) =

British colonial (1917–1997)

Minister of Finance
- In office 1959–1964
- Preceded by: Ralph Nicholson
- Succeeded by: Arthur Wina

Personal details
- Born: 3 August 1917 Portsmouth, United Kingdom
- Died: 24 September 1997 (aged 80) Cambridge, United Kingdom

Trevelyan Codrington "Trevor" Gardner CBE (3 August 1917 – 24 September 1997) was a British colonial and university administrator. He was Minister of Finance of Northern Rhodesia from 1959 to 1964, also serving as a member of the Legislative Council, and later treasurer of Wolfson College, Cambridge from 1969 to 1983.

== Biography ==
Born in Portsmouth in 1917, Gardner was educated at Taunton's School in Southampton before attending the Queen's College, Oxford, where he studied philosophy, politics and economics and earned a Bachelor of Letters. After graduating he joined the Hampshire Regiment during World War II.

Following the war Gardner joined the Colonial Service and was appointed to a post in Fort Jameson in Northern Rhodesia. He spent most of his time in the capital Lusaka, and in 1959 was appointed Minister of Finance, a post he held until 1964. As Minister of Finance he also served as an ex officio member of the Legislative Council. He was made a CBE in the 1960 Birthday Honours.

After returning to the UK, Gardner started working for the University of Cambridge, where he became deputy treasurer of Wolfson College. Between 1969 and 1983 he was treasurer of the college. He was involved in the establishment of Robinson College serving as a trustee and becoming an honorary fellow. He was also an honorary fellow of Darwin College.

He died in Cambridge in 1997 aged 80.
