= Alexander Chikwanda =

Zambian politician (1938–2022)

Minister of Finance
- In office October 2011 – September 2016
- President: Michael Sata (2011–14); Edgar Lungu (2015–2016)
- Preceded by: Situmbeko Musokotwane
- Succeeded by: Felix Mutati
- In office 1973–1976
- President: Kenneth Kaunda
- Preceded by: John Mwanakatwe
- Succeeded by: John Mwanakatwe

Member of the National Assembly for Kalulushi
- In office 1970–1978
- Preceded by: Frank Chitambala
- Succeeded by: Webster Lamba

Member of the National Assembly for Kitwe North
- In office 1964–
- Preceded by: Seat created

Personal details
- Born: December 24, 1938 Northern Rhodesia
- Died: 3 May 2022 (aged 83)
- Party: UNIP; Patriotic Front
- Relations: Michael Sata (nephew)
- Education: Lund University (BSc)
- Profession: Economist

Alexander Bwalya Chikwanda (24 December 1938 – 3 May 2022) was a Zambian politician. He was a member of the National Assembly during the 1960s and again in the 2010s, also serving as Minister of Finance from 1973 to 1976 and again from October 2011 to September 2016.

== Biography ==
He studied economics at Lund University in Sweden.

In the 1964 general elections he was elected to the Legislative Council in the Kitwe North constituency, but later gave up his seat so that it could be contested by Andrew Mutemba. He returned to the National Assembly as MP for Kalulushi in a by-election in 1970 and retained his seat in the National Assembly at the 1973 elections.

In October 2011, he became a member of the National Assembly again after being nominated by President Michael Sata. He spent the entire term up to May 2016 as the Minister of Finance.

== Personal life ==
He was an uncle of the former President Michael Sata. Chikwanda died on 3 May 2022, at the age of 83.
