= Keembe =

Constituency of the National Assembly of Zambia

Keembe was a constituency of the National Assembly of Zambia. It covered the northern part of Chibombo District in Central Province, including the town of Chibombo.

== List of MPs ==
Election	MP	Party
1973	Willard Ntalasha	United National Independence Party
1978	Robin Mwanza	United National Independence Party
Seat abolished
1991	Saul Chipwayambokoma	Movement for Multi-Party Democracy
1996	Jeston Mulando	Movement for Multi-Party Democracy
2001	Lackson Mapushi	Movement for Multi-Party Democracy
2006	Ronald Shikapwasha	Movement for Multi-Party Democracy
2011	Ronald Shikapwasha	Movement for Multi-Party Democracy
2016	Princess Kasune	United Party for National Development
2021	Princess Kasune	United Party for National Development
Seat abolished (split into Keembe West and Keembe East)
