= Stanley Kakubo =

Zambian politician (born 1980)

Stanley Kasongo Kakubo

Minister of Foreign Affairs
- In office 7 September 2021 – 26 December 2023
- Preceded by: Joseph Malanji
- Succeeded by: Mulambo Haimbe

Member of the National Assembly for Kapiri Mposhi
- In office August 2016 – May 2026
- Preceded by: Eddie Musonda

Personal details
- Born: 24 May 1980 (age 46) Livingstone, Zambia
- Party: United Party for National Development
- Profession: Accountant

Stanley Kasongo Kakubo (born 24 May 1980) is a Zambian politician. He was the Member of the National Assembly for Kapiri Mposhi from August 2016 to May 2026 and was Minister of Foreign Affairs between September 2021 and December 2023.

== Biography ==
Kakubo was born in Livingstone and spent part of his youth living in Kapiri Mposhi. His father worked for Zambia Railways. He attended the School of Natural Sciences at the University of Zambia, before leaving to study chartered accountancy in United Kingdom. After returning to Zambia, he joined the Zambia National Commercial Bank where he was a manager for treasury and business banking.

Kakubo was chosen as United Party for National Development candidate for Kapiri Mposhi for the 2016 general elections, a seat held by the Patriotic Front. He was subsequently elected to the National Assembly with a 1,590 majority. After becoming an MP, he joined the parliamentary Budget Committee.

In February 2021 Kakubo was appointed to the UPND national management committee. In the 2021 general elections he was re-elected with a 4,000-vote majority. With UPND leader Hakainde Hichilema winning the presidential election, Kakubo was appointed Minister of Foreign Affairs on 7 September.

In April 2022 Kakubo was embroiled in a controversy after being seen leaving a Chinese factory with a bag, later explained as a calendar. The next year, after social media stories of Kakubo being paid $200,000 and a luxury Mercedes-Benz vehicle, he resigned as Foreign Affairs Minister.

Ahead of the 2026 general election, Kapiri Mposhi constituency was split into two constituencies, namely Kapiri Mposhi West and Kapiri Mposhi East. Kakubo decided to stand as the UPND candidate in Kapiri Mposhi West and he was elected.
