= Ministry of Works and Supply =

Government ministry of Zambia

The Ministry of Works and Supply was a ministry in Zambia. It was headed by the Minister of Works and Supply.

== History ==
In 2011 the ministry was merged with the Ministry of Transport and Communications to form the Ministry of Transport, Works, Supply and Communication. The merger was reversed in 2015.

== List of ministers ==
Minister	Party	Term start	Term end
Minister of Transport and Works
William Gray Dunlop	United Federal Party	1959	1961
Harry Franklin	Central Africa Party	1961	1962
Francis Stubbs	Northern Rhodesian African National Congress	1962	
Minister of Power, Transport and Works
Fwanyanga Mulikita	United National Independence Party	1971	1973
Minister of Works and Supply
Andrew Kashita	Movement for Multi-Party Democracy	1994	1995
Minister of Transport, Works, Supply and Communication
Yamfwa Mukanga	Patriotic Front	2011	2012
Christopher Yaluma	Patriotic Front	2012	2013
Yamfwa Mukanga	Patriotic Front	2013	2015
Minister of Works and Supply
Ronald Chitotela	Patriotic Front	2016	2016
Mathew Nkhuwa	Patriotic Front	2016	2018
Felix Mutati	Patriotic Front	2018	2019
Sylvia Bambala Chalikosa	Patriotic Front	2019	2021

=== Deputy ministers ===
Deputy Minister	Party	Term start	Term end
Deputy Minister of Works and Supply
John Mwaimba	Movement for Multi-Party Democracy	2006	2006
Deputy Minister of Transport, Works, Supply and Communication
James Kapyanga	Patriotic Front	2015	2015
