= Rodney Sikumba =

Zambian politician

Minister of Tourism
- In office 7 September 2021 – 15 May 2026
- President: Hakainde Hichilema
- Preceded by: Ronald Chitotela
- Succeeded by: Princess Kasune

Member of the National Assembly for Livingstone
- In office August 2021 – 15 May 2026
- Preceded by: Mathews Jere
- Succeeded by: Gracious Mayangwa

Personal details
- Born: 29 March 1980 (age 46) Zambia
- Party: United Party for National Development
- Education: University of Zambia
- Occupation: Politician

Rhodine Sikumba, commonly known as Rodney Sikumba, is a Zambian politician. He was the Minister of Tourism of Zambia and the member of parliament for Livingstone Constituency, both from 2021 to 2026. He is a member of the United Party for National Development (UPND). He was born on 29 March 1980. He holds a Bachelor's degree in Arts and a Masters of Business Administration.

== Political career ==
Sikumba stood as the United Party for National Development candidate for MP in Livingstone constituency at the 2021 general election on 12 August 2021 and was elected. The following month, President Hakainde Hichilema appointed him as the Minister of Tourism and Arts.

On 18 May 2026, Sikumba announced that he has withdrawn from seeking re-election in Livingstone and will not stand for any position in the 2026 general election.
