= Chipangali East =

National Assembly constituency in Zambia

Chipangali East is a constituency of the National Assembly of Zambia. It was created in 2026 when Chipangali constituency was split into two constituencies (Chipangali West and Chipangali East). It covers the eastern part of Chipangali District.

== List of MPs ==
| Election year | MP | Party |
Chipangali East
| 2026 | Andrew Lubusha | United Party for National Development |
