= Kazungula North =

National Assembly constituency in Zambia

Kazungula North is a constituency of the National Assembly of Zambia. It was created in 2026 when Katombola was split into two constituencies (Kazungula North and Kazungula South). It covers the northern part of Kazungula District, including Nyawa.

== List of MPs ==
Election year	MP	Party
Kazungula North
2026	Clement Andeleki	United Party for National Development
