= Keembe West =

National Assembly constituency in Zambia

Keembe West is a constituency of the National Assembly of Zambia. It was created in 2026 when Keembe was split into two constituencies (Keembe West and Keembe East). It covers the north-western part of Chibombo District.

== List of MPs ==
Election year	MP	Party
Keembe West
2026	Princess Kasune	United Party for National Development
