= Kapiri Mposhi (constituency) =

Zambian National Assembly constituency

Kapiri Mposhi was a constituency of the National Assembly of Zambia. It covered the town of Kapiri Mposhi and surrounding areas in Kapiri Mposhi District of Central Province.

== List of MPs ==
Election year	MP	Party
1991	Gabriel Maka	Movement for Multi-Party Democracy
1996	Macdonald Nkabika	Independent
2001	John Mwaimba	Movement for Multi-Party Democracy
2006	Friday Malwa	Movement for Multi-Party Democracy
2011	Lawrence Zimba	Movement for Multi-Party Democracy
2013 (by-election)	Eddie Musonda	Patriotic Front
2016	Stanley Kakubo	United Party for National Development
2021	Stanley Kakubo	United Party for National Development
Seat abolished (split into Kapiri Mposhi West and Kapiri Mposhi East)
