= Katombola =

Constituency of the National Assembly of Zambia

Katombola was a constituency of the National Assembly of Zambia. It covered Kazungula and surrounding areas in Kazungula District of Southern Province.

== List of MPs ==
Election year	MP	Party
Katombora
1973	Kebby Musokotwane	United National Independence Party
1978	Kebby Musokotwane	United National Independence Party
1983	Kebby Musokotwane	United National Independence Party
1988	Henry Siamani	United National Independence Party
1991	Mathew Sikiti	Movement for Multi-Party Democracy
1996	Aggrey Kanchele	Movement for Multi-Party Democracy
2001	Regina Musokotwane	United Party for National Development
Katombola
2006	Regina Musokotwane	United Party for National Development
2011	Derick Livune	United Party for National Development
2016	Derick Livune	United Party for National Development
2021	Clement Andeleki	United Party for National Development
Seat abolished (split into Kazungula North and Kazungula South)
