= Chipangali (constituency) =

Constituency of the National Assembly of Zambia

Chipangali was a constituency of the National Assembly of Zambia. It covered the village of Chipangali in Chipangali District of Eastern Province.

== List of MPs ==
Election year	MP	Party
1973	Gideon Luhana	United National Independence Party
1978	Charles Tembo	United National Independence Party
1983	Sorry Banda	United National Independence Party
1988	Gershom Nkhoma	United National Independence Party
1991	Gershom Nkhoma	United National Independence Party
1996	Grandson Ngoma	Movement for Multi-Party Democracy
2001	Lucas Phiri	United National Independence Party
2006	Vincent Mwale	Movement for Multi-Party Democracy
2011	Vincent Mwale	Movement for Multi-Party Democracy
2016	Vincent Mwale	Patriotic Front
2021	Andrew Lubusha	Patriotic Front
Seat abolished (split into Chipangali West and Chipangali East)
