= Ministry of Infrastructure and Urban Development =

Government ministry of Zambia

The Ministry of Infrastructure and Urban Development is a ministry in Zambia. It is responsible for overseeing infrastructure development, housing policies, and urban planning in the country. The ministry plays a key role in national development through the construction and maintenance of roads, public buildings, and housing projects. It is headed by the minister of infrastructure, housing and urban development.

It was called the Ministry of Housing and Infrastructure Development prior to the 2021 general election and called the Ministry of Infrastructure, Housing and Urban Development between the 2021 and 2026 general elections. In October 2026, the housing portfolio was moved to the new Ministry of Housing.

It is the parent ministry of the Road Development Agency (RDA) and the National Council for Construction (NCC). It is one of the five ministries that form the Public-Private Partnership (PPP) Council, with the other four being the Ministry of Finance and National Planning, Ministry of Technology and Science, Ministry of Commerce, Trade and Industry and Ministry of Transport and Logistics.

== List of ministers ==
Minister	Party	Term start	Term end
Minister of Housing and Infrastructure Development
Ronald Chitotela	Patriotic Front	2016	2019
Vincent Mwale	Patriotic Front	2019	2021
Minister of Infrastructure, Housing and Urban Development
Charles Milupi	Alliance for Democracy and Development	2021	2026
Minister of Infrastructure and Urban Development
Collins Nzovu	United Party for National Development	2026	
