= Rufunsa (constituency) =

Constituency of the National Assembly of Zambia

Rufunsa is a constituency of the National Assembly of Zambia. It covers the towns of Karoma, Mukunku, Rufunsa and Shingela in Rufunsa District of Lusaka Province.

== List of MPs ==
Election year	MP	Party
1964	Solomon Kalulu	United National Independence Party
Seat abolished
1991	Bartholomew Seyama	United National Independence Party
By-election	Scholastica Ngoma	Movement for Multi-Party Democracy
1996	Samuel Chipungu	National Party
2001	Damian Kayaba	Forum for Democracy and Development
2006	Kenneth Chipungu	Movement for Multi-Party Democracy
2011	Kenneth Chipungu	Movement for Multi-Party Democracy
2016	Sheal Mulyata	United Party for National Development
2021	Sheal Mulyata	United Party for National Development
2026	Sheal Mulyata	United Party for National Development
