= Evans Lawrence =

Zambian politician

Member of the National Assembly
- In office March 14, 2013 – May 2016
- Preceded by: Howard Sikwela
- Succeeded by: Mathews Jere
- Constituency: Livingstone

Personal details
- Born: Evans Lawrence
- Party: Patriotic Front
- Children: 2
- Occupation: Politician

Evans Lawrence is a Zambian politician and businessman.

== Political career ==
Lawrence contested in a Livingstone by-election held on March 14, 2013; he emerged victorious and succeeded Howard Sikwela as Livingstone's Member of Parliament.

On November 5, 2013, President Michael Sata appointed Lawrence as Deputy Minister of Tourism.
