= Princess Kasune =

Zambian politician (born 1975)

Princess Kasane

Minister of Tourism
- Incumbent
- Assumed office October 2026
- Preceded by: Rodney Sikumba

Member of the National Assembly for Keembe West
- Incumbent
- Assumed office 13 August 2026
- Preceded by: Seat created

Minister of Justice
- In office 5 June 2024 – 15 May 2026
- President: Hakainde Hichilema
- Preceded by: Mulambo Haimbe
- Succeeded by: Jack Mwiimbu

Provincial Minister for Central Province
- In office 25 September 2023 – 5 June 2024
- Preceded by: Credo Nanjuwa
- Succeeded by: Mwabashike Nkulukusa

Member of the National Assembly for Keembe
- In office August 2016 – 15 May 2026
- Preceded by: Ronald Shikapwasha
- Succeeded by: Seat abolished

Personal details
- Born: 12 November 1975 (age 50) Kabwe, Zambia
- Party: United Party for National Development
- Education: University of Zambia
- Occupation: Politician

Princess Kasune Zulu (born 12 November 1975) is a Zambian politician who is serving as the current Minister of Tourism and member of parliament for Keembe West. She was the member of parliament for Keembe from 2016 to 2026. She is a prominent AIDS activist and the first National Assembly member to announce she was living with the condition.

== Biography ==
Princess Kasune was born 12 November 1975 in Kabwe.

During the Zambian AIDS epidemic, when she was 17, her mother died as a result of AIDS, quickly followed by her father. Princess Kasune married when she was 18; her older husband, Moffat Zulu, had already lost two of his previous wives to AIDS. In 1997, she took an AIDS test which came out positive, prompting her to begin a life of AIDS activism.

Initially she took an unconventional approach by giving the appearance of a prostitute and hitching lifts with long-distance lorry-drivers, who she would then lecture on the importance of condom use. She was appointed an ambassador for World Vision International's Hope Programme, and in that capacity travelled to the US in 1993 to meet President George H. W. Bush and convinced him to commit $15 billion to the fight against AIDS in Africa. She was also selected as a delegate on a 2005 "Women and AIDS U.S. Tour: Empower Women, Save Lives," tour sponsored by the United Nations. She is a host of Positive Living, a health-related radio program.

In 2016, she was elected as a member of the National Assembly of Zambia for the constituency of Keembe, as a member of the United Party for National Development. As one of her earliest acts in the Assembly, she announced she had been living with HIV since 1997 - the first assembly member to declare their HIV status. She was re-elected for Keembe constituency in 2021.

On 25 September 2023, Princess Kasune was appointed Minister of Central Province by President Hakainde Hichilema (replacing Credo Nanjuwa) and on 5 June 2024, Kasune was appointed as the county's first ever female Minister of Justice, replacing Mulambo Haimbe.

In April 2026, Keembe constituency was split into two constituencies, namely Keembe West and Keembe East. She decided to stand as the UPND candidate in Keembe West at the 2026 general election. After the filing of nominations by aspiring candidates in May 2026, she only had one challenger. The challenger withdrew during that month and Princess Kasune was automatically elected unopposed as the member of parliament for Keembe West for the upcoming term. After the UPND won the presidential election in August 2026, Kasune was appointed as the Minister of Tourism in October 2026.
