= Kapiri Mposhi East =

National Assembly constituency in Zambia

Kapiri Mposhi East is a constituency of the National Assembly of Zambia. It was created in 2026 when Kapiri Mposhi constituency was split into two constituencies (Kapiri Mposhi West and Kapiri Mposhi East). It covers the eastern part of Kapiri Mposhi District, including the Kapiri Mposhi town centre.

== List of MPs ==
Election year	MP	Party
Kapiri Mposhi East
2026	Davison Matutu	United Party for National Development
