= Frank Tayali =

Zambian politician

Minister of Transport and Logistics
- In office 7 September 2021 – 15 May 2026
- President: Hakainde Hichilema
- Preceded by: Mutotwe Kafwaya
- Succeeded by: Charles Milupi

Member of the National Assembly for Ndola Central
- In office August 2021 – May 2026
- Preceded by: Emmanuel Mulenga
- Succeeded by: Emmanuel Mulenga

Personal details
- Born: 13 January 1975 (age 51) Lusaka, Zambia
- Party: United Party for National Development
- Education: University of Zambia
- Occupation: Politician

Frank Museba Tayali (born 13 January 1975) is a Zambian politician. He served as the member of parliament for Ndola Central from August 2021 to May 2026, during which he served as the Minister of Transport and Logistics. He is a member of the United Party for National Development (UPND). He holds Bachelor's degree in chemical engineering and a Law Degree (LLB).

== Political career ==
Frank Tayali was the United Party for National Development (UPND) candidate in Ndola Central Constituency at the 2021 general election and he was elected. After the UPND won the presidential election in August 2021, Tayali was appointed as the Minister of Transport and Logistics by President Hakainde Hichilema the following month.

Ahead of the 2026 general election to happen in August 2026, Tayali was adopted as the UPND candidate to recontest the Ndola Central parliamentary seat and he finished second at the election, with Emmanuel Mulenga (his predecessor) of the Resolute Party winning the parliamentary seat.
