= Gracious Mayangwa =

Zambian politician

Honorable Gracious Mayangwa

Elected member of the National Assembly of Zambia
- Incumbent
- Assumed office August 2026
- President: Hakainde Hichilema
- Constituency: Livingstone Central

Personal details
- Born: Gracious Dillon Mayangwa; September 22, 1984 (age 42) Livingstone, Zambia
- Party: United Party for National Development
- Education: Mulungushi University

Gracious Dillon Mayangwa (born September 22, 1984) is a Zambian politician and member of the United Party for National Development (UPND) who represents Livingstone Central Constituency in the National Assembly.

== Personal life ==
Mayangwa was born in 1984 in Livingstone and grew up in the residential area of Mbita in Livingstone. He attended Namatama Primary School before proceeding to Mumbwa High School. He later studied agricultural science at Mulungushi University and worked as a farm manager at the university for six years after graduating.

== Political Career ==
Mayangwa won the Livingstone Central parliamentary seat for the United Party for National Development (UPND) in the 2026 general election, receiving 18,390 votes. His closest rival, National Reconciliation Party for Unity and Prosperity (NRPUP) candidate Mwewa Chilufya, polled 4,026 votes.
