= Keembe East =

National Assembly constituency in Zambia

Keembe East is a constituency of the National Assembly of Zambia. It was created in 2026 when Keembe was split into two constituencies (Keembe West and Keembe East). It covers the north-eastern part of Chibombo District, including the town of Chibombo.

== List of MPs ==
Election year	MP	Party
2026	Emmanuel Chiminsa	United Party for National Development
