= Ministry of Energy (Zambia) =

Government ministry of Zambia

The Ministry of Energy is a ministry in Zambia. It is headed by the Minister of Energy.

In 2012 the Ministry of Water and Energy was merged with the Ministry of Mines to form the Ministry of Mines, Energy and Water Development. The merger was reversed in 2015, with the Ministry of Energy and Water Development coming into being. In 2016 Water Development was transferred to the new Ministry of Water Development, Sanitation and Environmental Protection.

== List of ministers ==
Minister	Party	Term start	Term end
Minister of Energy and Water Development
Felix Mutati	Movement for Multiparty Democracy	2002	2004
Minister of Energy
David Mabumba	Patriotic Front	2016	2018
Mathew Nkhuwa	Patriotic Front	2018	2021
Peter Chibwe Kapala	United Party for National Development	2021	2024
Makozo Chikote	United Party for National Development	2024	2026

=== Deputy ministers ===
Deputy Minister	Party	Term start	Term end
Deputy Minister of Energy
Austin Liato	Movement for Multi-Party Democracy	2005	2005
Deputy Minister of Energy and Water Development
Friday Malwa	Movement for Multi-Party Democracy	2006	2007
Lameck Chibombamilimo	Movement for Multi-Party Democracy	2008	2009
