= Mike Mulongoti =

Zambian politician (1951–2019)

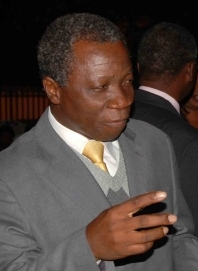

Mike Mulongoti (born 3 August 1951, died 2 May 2019) was a Zambian politician who served as the president of the People's Party.

== Career ==
=== Zambian Parliament ===
Mulongoti earned a Masters of Business Administration prior to his career in politics. He joined the Movement for Multi-Party Democracy and served as Deputy Minister of Defense. He was subsequently one of 22 ministers who were fired for opposing an amendment to the Constitution to extend President Frederick Chiluba's tenure. Mulongoti was a founding member of the Forum for Democracy and Development and contested the 2001 general elections.

Mulongoti was later appointed as Minister of Information and Broadcasting Services and Minister of Works and Supply under presidents Levy Mwanawasa and Rupiah Banda. In this role, he contributed to the civil forfeiture of nearly $60 million stolen during the rule of Frederick Chiluba. The money was used to upgrade hospitals.

== Death and legacy ==
Mulongoti was diagnosed with cancer in 2018. He was initially treated at University Teaching Hospital before being evacuated to South Africa for specialized treatment. He returned to Zambia later and died on 2 May 2019. Mulongoti was laid to rest at Leopard's Hill Memorial Park and is survived by wife Betty Mulongoti. Mulongoti’s closest political ally, Nason Msoni, attended the service.
