= Office of the Vice-President (Zambia) =

The Office of the Vice-President is a ministry in Zambia. It is headed by the Vice-President of Zambia. One or more ministers are also appointed to the Office.

== List of deputy ministers ==
| Minister | Party | Term start | Term end |
Deputy Minister
| Friday Malwa | Movement for Multiparty Democracy | 2007 | 2008 |
| Davies Mwango | Patriotic Front | 2013 | 2015 |
| Stephen Kampyongo | Patriotic Front | 2015 | 2015 |
| Bwalya Chungu | Patriotic Front | 2015 | 2016 |
| Lawrence Sichalwe | Patriotic Front | 2015 | 2016 |
Minister
| Sylvia Chalikosa | Patriotic Front | 2016 | 2019 |
| Olipa Phiri | Patriotic Front | 2019 | 2021 |
