= Kazungula South =

National Assembly constituency in Zambia

Kazungula South is a constituency of the National Assembly of Zambia. It was created in 2026 when Katombola was split into two constituencies (Kazungula North and Kazungula South). It covers the southern part of Kazungula District, including Kazungula, Katombola, Mambova, Katapazi and Mukuni.

== List of MPs ==
Election year	MP	Party
2026	Siasiloka Mukuni	United Party for National Development
