= Kaputa (constituency) =

Constituency of the National Assembly of Zambia

Kaputa is a constituency of the National Assembly of Zambia. It covers the towns of Kaputa, Nkonta and Nkoshya in Kaputa District of Northern Province.

== List of MPs ==
Election year	MP	Party
1973	Wilson Chipili	United National Independence Party
1978	Wilson Chipili	United National Independence Party
1983	Kingfred Katai	United National Independence Party
1988	Wilson Chipili	United National Independence Party
1991	Langstone Kapisha	Movement for Multi-Party Democracy
1996	Paul Bupe	Movement for Multi-Party Democracy
2001	Mutale Nalumango	Movement for Multi-Party Democracy
2006	Mutale Nalumango	Movement for Multi-Party Democracy
2011	Maxas Ng'onga	Patriotic Front
2016	Maxas Ng'onga	Patriotic Front
2021	Elvis Nkandu	United Party for National Development
2026	Elvis Nkandu	United Party for National Development
