= Sheal S. Mulyata =

Zambian politician

Sheal Mulyata

Minister of Community Development and Social Services
- Incumbent
- Assumed office October 2026
- President: Hakainde Hichilema
- Preceded by: Doreen Mwamba

Member of the National Assembly for Rufunsa
- Incumbent
- Assumed office August 2016
- Preceded by: Kenneth Chipungu

Provincial Minister for Lusaka Province
- In office 7 September 2021 – 15 May 2026
- President: Hakainde Hichilema
- Preceded by: Bowman Lusambo
- Succeeded by: Obvious Mwaliteta

Personal details
- Born: 25 June 1960 (age 66)
- Party: United Party for National Development
- Occupation: Politician, banker

Sheal S. Mulyata is a member of the National Assembly of Zambia. She has been the member of parliament for Rufunsa constituency since 2016. She is the current Minister of Community Development and Social Services. She is a United Party for National Development politician and was the Provincial Minister for Lusaka Province from September 2021 to May 2026.
