= Clement Andeleki =

Zambian lawyer, politician and businessman

Member of the National Assembly for Katombola
- In office August 2021 – May 2026
- Preceded by: Derick Livune

Member of the National Assembly for Kazungula North
- Incumbent
- Assumed office August 2026

Personal details
- Born: Clement Andeleki; 4 October 1974 (age 52) Katombola, Zambia
- Party: United Party for National Development
- Children: 3
- Occupation: Lawyer

Clement Andeleki (born October 4, 1974) is a Zambian lawyer, politician and businessman who currently serves as the member of parliament for Kazungula North, having been elected in August 2026. He was the Member of Parliament for Katombola from 2021 to 2026.

== Political career ==
Andeleki contested in the 2021 general election for Katombola's Parliamentary seat as the United Party for National Development (UPND) candidate and he was elected.

In April 2026, Katombola constituency was split into two constituencies, namely Kazungula North and Kazungula South. Andeleki decided to stand in Kazungula North as the UPND candidate at the 2026 general election to happen in August that year. At the end of nomination filing by aspiring candidates, it was declared that Andeleki was the only person who applied to stand for member of parliament in Kazungula North and he was elected in advance as the MP for the new constituency.
