= Elias Mubanga =

Zambian politician

Minister of Small and Medium Enterprises Development
- In office 17 September 2021 – 19 February 2026
- President: Hakainde Hichilema
- Succeeded by: Mufunelo Malama

Personal details
- Born: 15 March 1967 (age 59) Zambia
- Party: United Party for National Development
- Education: University of Zambia
- Occupation: Politician, environmental engineer

Elias Mubanga is a Zambian politician and was a nominated member of parliament from September 2021 to May 2026. He was the Minister of Small and Medium Enterprises Development from 17 September 2021 to 19 February 2026.

== Career ==
Elias Mubanga is a member of the United Party for National Development and was picked as a nominated member of Parliament by President Hakainde Hichilema. He was appointed by the president to be the Minister of Small and Medium Enterprises Development on 17 September 2021 and he served in that position up to 19 February 2026 when he was dismissed. He holds an associate degree in environmental engineering and a diploma in information technology and accounting.

On 13 May 2026, Mubanga announced that he will not participate in the 2026 general election.
