= Elisha Matambo =

Zambian politician (born 1970)

Hon. Elisha Matambo

Minister of Water Development and Sanitation
- Incumbent
- Assumed office October 2026
- Preceded by: Collins Nzovu

Member of Parliament for Lufwanyama East
- Incumbent
- Assumed office August 2026

Provincial Minister for Copperbelt Province
- In office 27 August 2021 – 15 May 2026
- President: Hakainde Hichilema
- Preceded by: Japhen Mwakalombe

Personal details
- Born: February 5, 1970 (age 56)
- Party: United Party for National Development
- Profession: Marketing executive, Politician

Elisha Matambo (born 5 February 1970) is a Zambian marketing executive and politician who currently serves as the Lufwanyama East member of Parliament and Minister of Water Development and Sanitation. He served as Provincial Minister for Copperbelt Province and as a nominated Member of Parliament under the United Party for National Development (UPND) from August 2021 to May 2026.

== Political career ==
In the UPND’s first cabinet, Matambo was appointed Provincial Minister for Copperbelt Province signed into office on 27 August 2021.

As Copperbelt Minister, Matambo attributed the province’s top performance in Grade 7 and Grade 9 national examinations to the free education policy enacted by the Hichilema administration.

He launched a partnership in August 2023 to provide free tertiary education to roughly 27,000 youths through collaboration between the government, ICOF, and Nkana Academy College of Education and Health Sciences.

Matambo also engaged in public messaging around border security, urging the Zambia National Service to intensify anti‑smuggling efforts and reinforcing that illicit trade undermines national development. In February 2024, he hosted the Chinese Ambassador Du Xiaohui, reaffirming cooperation in mining and Belt and Road initiatives related to the Copperbelt Province.

In December 2024, Matambo inspected Kitwe Teaching Hospital reconstruction and underscored government commitment to modernizing health infrastructure in the province. In mid‑2025, he emphasized moral and community development partnerships by donating materials toward construction projects led by church groups in Ndola.

In March 2026, Matambo toured the newly-opened 17-kilometre segment of the M4 road (Ndola - Mufulira road) and concluded that a 4-kilometre stretch near the Tom Mtine Toll Plaza had not been done in accordance with construction standards and he proceeded to request for Jaswin Ports Limited to rework on the identified stretch of road.

Ahead of the 2026 general election, Matambo was adopted by the United Party for National Development to be their candidate in Lufwanyama East and he was elected. In October 2026, he was appointed as the Minister of Water Development and Sanitation.
