= Doreen Mwamba =

Zambian politician

Minister of Community Development and Social Services
- In office 7 September 2021 – 15 May 2026
- President: Hakainde Hichilema
- Preceded by: Emerine Kabanshi
- Succeeded by: Sheal Mulyata

Nominated Member of the National Assembly
- In office 7 September 2021 – 15 May 2026

Personal details
- Born: 20 March 1966 (age 60) Livingstone, Zambia
- Party: United Party for National Development
- Education: University of Zambia
- Occupation: Politician

Doreen Sefuke Mwamba (born 20 Marh 1966) is a Zambian politician. She was the Minister of Community Development and Social Services in Zambia and a nominated member of parliament from 7 September 2021 to 15 May 2026. She is a member of the United Party for National Development (UPND).

In January 2026, she announced that after her tenure has concluded on 15 May 2026, she will step down and not participate in future elections.
