= Collins Nzovu =

Zambian politician

Minister of Infrastructure and Urban Development
- Incumbent
- Assumed office October 2026
- President: Hakainde Hichilema
- Preceded by: Charles Milupi

Minister of Green Economy and Environment
- In office 7 September 2021 – 13 June 2024
- President: Hakainde Hichilema
- Preceded by: Position created
- Succeeded by: Mike Mposha

Minister of Water Development and Sanitation
- In office 14 June 2024 – 15 May 2026
- Preceded by: Mike Mposha
- Succeeded by: Elisha Matambo

Member of the National Assembly for Nangoma
- Incumbent
- Assumed office August 2021
- Preceded by: Boyd Hamusonde

Personal details
- Born: 1 March 1980 (age 46) Lusaka, Zambia
- Party: United Party for National Development
- Education: University of Zambia
- Occupation: Politician

Collins Nzovu is a Zambian politician. He is the current member of parliament for Nangoma and the current Minister of Infrastructure and Urban Development. He served as the Minister of Green Economy and Environment from September 2021 to June 2024 and as the Minister of Water Development and Sanitation from June 2024 to May 2026. He is a member of the United Party for National Development (UPND).

== Political career ==
Collins Nzovu stood as the UPND candidate for MP in Nangoma constituency at the 2021 general election on 12 August 2021 and he was elected. The following month, President Hakainde Hichilema appointed him as the Minister of Green Economy and Environment in the initial cabinet. On 13 June 2024, he was appointed as the Minister of Water Development and Sanitation, thereby exchanging ministries with Mike Mposha.

At the 2026 general election in August 2026, Nzovu was re-elected as the Nangoma member of parliament. In October 2026, President Hakainde Hichilema appointed Nzovu as the Minister of Infrastructure and Urban Development.
