= Makozo Chikote =

Zambian politician

Member of the National Assembly for Luampa East
- Incumbent
- Assumed office August 2026

Minister of Energy
- In office 20 July 2024 – 15 May 2026
- President: Hakainde Hichilema
- Preceded by: Peter Kapala

Minister of Fisheries and Livestock
- In office 17 September 2021 – 19 July 2024
- Preceded by: Nkandu Luo
- Succeeded by: Peter Kapala

Member of the National Assembly for Luampa
- In office August 2016 – 15 May 2026
- Preceded by: Josephine Limata

Personal details
- Born: 25 May 1975 (age 51) Luampa, Western Province, Zambia
- Party: United Party for National Development
- Education: University of Zambia
- Occupation: Politician

Makozo Chikote (born 25 May 1975) is a Zambian politician who currently serves as the member of parliament for Luampa East. He was the Minister of Energy in Zambia from 20 July 2024 to 15 May 2026 and the Minister of Fisheries and Livestock from 17 September 2021 to 19 July 2024. He was also the member of parliament for Luampa Constituency from August 2016 to May 2026. He is a member of United Party for National Development (UPND).

== Political career ==
Makozo Chikote stood as the United Party for National Development (UPND) candidate for parliament in Luampa constituency at the 2026 general election and he was elected. He stood again as the UPND candidate for parliament in Luampa at the 2021 general election in August 2021 and he was re-elected.

After the UPND won the presidential election in August 2021, Chikote was appointed as the Minister of Fisheries and Livestock by President Hakainde Hichilema the following month. On 19 July 2024, Chikote was appointed as the Minister of Energy, thereby exchanging roles with Peter Kapala.

Ahead of the 2026 general election, Luampa constituency (where he was the incumbent) was split into two constituencies (Luampa West and Luampa East) and Chikote decided to contest as the UPND candidate for parliament in Luampa East. At the election in August 2026, he was elected as the Luampa East member of parliament.
