= Ministry of Small and Medium Enterprises Development =

Government ministry of Zambia

Agency overview
- Type: Constituent Department of the State Council (cabinet-level executive department)
- Jurisdiction: Government of Zambia
- Headquarters: Lusaka
- Minister responsible: Mufunelo Malama

The Ministry of Small and Medium Enterprises Development is the ministry in the Government of Zambia. It is the apex executive body that formulates and administrates rules, regulations and laws relating to small and medium enterprises in Zambia.

The ministry is tasked with the promotion of micro and small enterprises.
