= Situmbeko Musokotwane =

Minister of Finance of Zambia

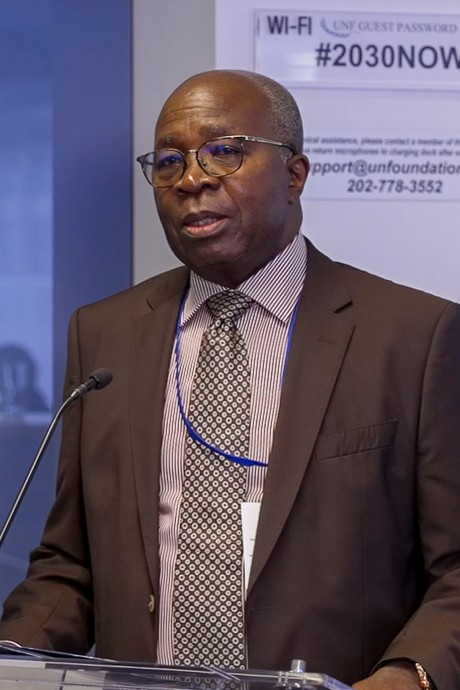
- Musokotwane at the 2026 IMF-World Bank Spring Meetings

Minister of Finance and National Planning
- Incumbent
- Assumed office 27 August 2021
- President: Hakainde Hichilema
- Preceded by: Bwalya Ng'andu
- In office 2008–2011
- President: Rupiah Banda
- Preceded by: N'gandu Peter Magande
- Succeeded by: Alexander Chikwanda

Member of the National Assembly
- Incumbent
- Assumed office September 2011
- Preceded by: Hastings Imasiku
- Constituency: Liuwa

Personal details
- Born: Situmbeko Musokotwane; 25 May 1956 (age 70)
- Party: United Party for National Development
- Education: University of Konstanz (PhD); University of Zambia
- Profession: Economist

Situmbeko Musokotwane (born 25 May 1956) is a Zambian politician and economist serving as Minister of Finance and National Planning since 2021. He previously held the same position from 2008 to 2011 under President Rupiah Banda. Musokotwane has represented Liuwa in the National Assembly since 2011, first as a member of the Movement for Multi-Party Democracy (MMD) and later as a member of the United Party for National Development (UPND).

Musokotwane studied economics at the University of Zambia and later obtained a master's degree in Monetary Economics from the University of Dar es Salaam and a PhD in Monetary Economics from the University of Konstanz in Germany. He worked at the Bank of Zambia, where he held senior positions before entering government. He later served as an alternate governor at the International Monetary Fund, the African Development Bank and the World Bank.

Musokotwane first became Minister of Finance in 2008 after President Rupiah Banda formed his government. He remained in the position until 2011, when he contested the Liuwa parliamentary seat in the 2011 general election and was elected. He was re-elected in 2016 and 2021.

After the 2021 general election, President Hakainde Hichilema appointed Musokotwane Minister of Finance and National Planning for a second time. He was reappointed to the position following the 2026 general election and was sworn in as part of Hichilema's second-term cabinet in September 2026.

== Education and career ==
Musokotwane studied economics at the University of Zambia, where he obtained a bachelor's degree in economics. He later obtained a master's degree in Monetary Economics from the University of Dar es Salaam and a PhD in Monetary Economics from the University of Konstanz in Germany.

Musokotwane worked at the Bank of Zambia, where he held several senior positions, including Director of Economics, Director of Financial Markets and Deputy Governor. He was involved in the introduction of open market operations and the reintroduction of Treasury bills and government securities auctions in Zambia. He also served as an alternate governor for Zambia at the International Monetary Fund, the African Development Bank and the World Bank.

In 1988, Musokotwane founded an agribusiness that developed into one of Zambia's large dairy farming operations.

=== First term as Minister of Finance ===
In 2008, President Rupiah Banda appointed Musokotwane as Minister of Finance. He took office as the government was changing the tax and regulatory framework for the mining sector, which was the main source of Zambia's export earnings.

One of the major issues during his first term was the mining tax regime. The government had introduced changes in 2008 that increased the corporate tax rate and mineral royalty rate and introduced a windfall tax on mining companies when copper prices reached specified levels. The measures became controversial after copper prices fell during the global financial crisis in late 2008 and 2009.

In his 2009 Budget, Musokotwane announced measures aimed at supporting the mining industry and the wider economy during the downturn. These included the removal of the windfall tax on copper income, a reduction in customs duty on heavy fuel oil used by the mining industry from 30% to 15%, and the introduction of value-added tax deferment on copper concentrate imports. The government also increased domestic borrowing and directed part of the additional financing towards infrastructure spending. The International Monetary Fund reported that Zambia's 2009 budget included measures to increase capital spending while responding to lower mining revenues.

Musokotwane also negotiated with mining companies over tax arrears arising from changes to the mining tax regime. In November 2010, he told Parliament that mining companies had agreed to pay tax arrears totalling K1.426 trillion, with payments scheduled for 2010 and 2011. He said the government expected increased revenue from the mining sector under the revised tax regime and planned to use additional revenue for infrastructure development.

During his tenure, the Zambian economy continued to grow despite the global downturn. The IMF reported that economic growth exceeded 6% in 2009, supported by increased copper production, a strong agricultural season and continued construction activity. By 2011, the government was also reporting increased investment and improvements in economic performance, while identifying infrastructure, electricity supply and the cost of doing business as continuing challenges.

Musokotwane left the finance ministry in 2011 and subsequently contested the Liuwa constituency in the 2011 general election.

=== Member of Parliament ===
Following his departure from the cabinet, Musokotwane contested the Liuwa constituency seat as the Movement for Multi-Party Democracy candidate in the 2011 general election and was elected to the National Assembly. He was re-elected in the 2016 general election after being adopted as the United Party for National Development (UPND) candidate. In September 2018, he was appointed the UPND's party whip in Parliament.

Musokotwane was re-elected for Liuwa as the UPND candidate in the 2021 general election.

=== Second term as Minister of Finance and National Planning ===
Following the 2021 general election, President Hakainde Hichilema appointed Musokotwane as Minister of Finance and National Planning. One of the main challenges facing Musokotwane when he returned to the ministry was Zambia's external debt crisis. Zambia had defaulted on its external debt in 2020 and was seeking a restructuring of its debt while negotiating a new programme with the International Monetary Fund (IMF).

Musokotwane led discussions with the IMF that resulted in a staff-level agreement on an Extended Credit Facility (ECF) programme in December 2021. The IMF Executive Board approved the 38-month programme in August 2022, providing Zambia with access to about US$1.3 billion.

The IMF programme was closely linked to Zambia's efforts to restructure its external debt. In 2022, Zambia received financing assurances from its official creditors after requesting debt treatment under the G20 Common Framework. Musokotwane welcomed the decision on behalf of the government and said Zambia remained committed to implementing economic reforms and providing greater transparency over its debt.

In June 2023, Zambia reached an agreement with its Official Creditor Committee on a restructuring of its external debt. The committee was co-chaired by China and France, with South Africa as vice-chair. The agreement provided debt relief consistent with the IMF programme and was described by the IMF as an important step towards restoring Zambia's debt sustainability. Musokotwane presented the agreement to the National Assembly on 27 June 2023.

The government subsequently negotiated with private creditors over Zambia's Eurobonds. In October 2023, the government reached an agreement in principle with the steering committee of an ad hoc creditor committee representing holders of Zambia's Eurobonds. Musokotwane said the proposed restructuring would permanently waive around US$700 million in claims and provide approximately US$2.5 billion in cash-flow relief during the IMF programme period.

By 2025, Musokotwane reported to Parliament that Zambia had completed the restructuring of its Eurobonds and had begun servicing the restructured bonds. The government had also reached agreements in principle with the Industrial and Commercial Bank of China and China Development Bank covering a combined US$1.5 billion in debt.

=== 2026 election and third term ===
In the 2026 general election, Musokotwane was again adopted as the UPND candidate for Liuwa. He initially faced one challenger, but the challenger withdrew before polling, leaving Musokotwane as the sole candidate for the constituency. He was subsequently returned to Parliament for Liuwa.

Following Hakainde Hichilema's re-election, Musokotwane was reappointed Minister of Finance and National Planning. He was sworn in on 14 September 2026 as part of Hichilema's second-term cabinet.
