= Charles Milupi =

Zambian politician

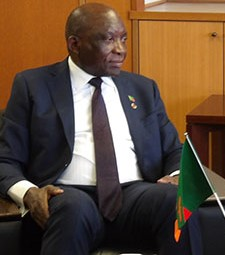
- February 2025

Minister of Transport and Logistics
- Incumbent
- Assumed office October 2026
- President: Hakainde Hichilema
- Preceded by: Frank Tayali

Minister of Infrastructure, Housing and Urban Development
- In office 17 September 2021 – 15 May 2026
- President: Hakainde Hichilema
- Preceded by: Vincent Mwale
- Succeeded by: Collins Nzovu

Member of the National Assembly for Luena
- In office 2006–2011
- Preceded by: Chrispin Sibetta
- Succeeded by: Mwambwa Imenda

Personal details
- Born: 25 April 1954 (age 72) Zambia
- Party: Alliance for Democracy and Development; UPND Alliance
- Education: University College Cardiff, UK
- Occupation: Politician, engineer

Charles Milupi is a Zambian politician who currently serves as the Minister of Transport and Logistics. He was the Minister of Infrastructure, Housing and Urban Development in the Zambian government from 17 September 2021 to 15 May 2026 and was a nominated member of parliament during this time. He previously served as the member of parliament for Luena constituency from 2006 to 2011. He is the president of the Alliance for Democracy and Development (ADD) and the chairperson of the UPND Alliance.

== Political career ==
Charles Milupi stood as an independent member of parliament (MP) for Luena constituency at the 2006 general election and won the seat.

On 14 May 2010, Milupi established his own party known as Alliance for Democracy and Development (ADD) and thus could no-longer be an independent candidate. A by-election was held for the Luena MP seat, with Milupi contesting as the candidate for his newly-formed political party. He won the by-election and retained his parliamentary seat up until the end of the term in 2011. He participated in the 2011 general election as the presidential candidate for his party and got the fourth-highest number of votes in a field of ten candidates with 0.9% of the vote.

In late 2018, an alliance of 10 political parties in Zambia was formed, named the Opposition Alliance, with the ADD being one of the ten parties and Milupi being the chairperson of the alliance. In February 2021, ahead of the 2021 general election, the Opposition Alliance was rebranded as the UPND Alliance and Milupi remained as the chairperson of the alliance. The alliance members decided to endorse Hakainde Hichilema of the UPND as their sole presidential candidate. After the UPND won that election, Milupi was appointed as the Minister of Infrastructure, Housing and Urban Development and therefore received a nominated seat in Parliament.

Ahead of the 2026 general election, Milupi, as the UPND Alliance chairperson, among other alliance members endorsed Hichilema for re-election, with Milupi not standing for any position in the election. After the UPND was re-elected in August 2026, Milupi was once again picked as a nominated member of parliament and was appointed as the Minister of Transport and Logistics by president Hichilema in October 2026.
