= Mulambo Haimbe =

Zambian politician (born 1976)

Minister of Foreign Affairs and International Cooperation
- Incumbent
- Assumed office 29 December 2023
- President: Hakainde Hichilema
- Preceded by: Stanley Kakubo

Minister of Justice
- In office 7 September 2021 – 4 June 2024
- President: Hakainde Hichilema
- Preceded by: Given Lubinda
- Succeeded by: Princess Kasune

Member of the National Assembly for Lusaka Central
- In office August 2021 – 15 May 2026
- Preceded by: Margaret Mwanakatwe
- Succeeded by: Msaiwale Mlewa

Personal details
- Born: 12 May 1976 (age 50) Lusaka, Zambia
- Party: United Party for National Development
- Education: University of Zambia
- Occupation: Lawyer, politician

Mulambo Hamakuni Haimbe (born 12 May 1976) is a Zambian lawyer and politician who serves as Minister of Foreign Affairs and International Cooperation since December 2023. He previously served as Minister of Justice from 2021 to 2024 under President Hakainde Hichilema.

Haimbe was elected as the Member of Parliament for Lusaka Central in the 2021 general election. He served in the constituency until the dissolution of Parliament in 2026. On 14 September 2026, Hichilema nominated Haimbe as a member of Parliament and maintained him as the Minister of Foreign Affairs and International Cooperation. He was subsequently sworn in as part of Hichilema's second-term cabinet.

Before entering politics, Haimbe practised law and worked in private practice and as legal counsel for several institutions. He holds a Bachelor of Laws degree from the University of Zambia and a Master of Laws in Construction Law and Arbitration from Robert Gordon University. He is a Fellow of the Chartered Institute of Arbitrators.

== Political career ==
=== Member of Parliament and Minister of Justice ===
Haimbe contested the Lusaka Central constituency as a United Party for National Development (UPND) candidate in the 2021 general election and was elected to the National Assembly of Zambia. In September 2021, President Hakainde Hichilema appointed him Minister of Justice.

During his tenure as Justice Minister, Haimbe oversaw a programme of legal reforms introduced by the Hichilema government. In December 2022, President Hichilema assented to the Penal Code (Amendment) Act, which removed the death penalty from Zambia's criminal law. The same month, Parliament repealed the offence of criminal defamation of the President, a colonial-era provision of the Penal Code. Haimbe also announced a review of the Penal Code and Criminal Procedure Code, which he described as outdated and in need of alignment with contemporary legal standards. The government also began reviewing the Public Order Act and other legislation during his tenure.

One of the major pieces of legislation enacted during his tenure was the Children's Code Act, 2022, which consolidated laws relating to children and established a legal framework covering areas including child protection, adoption, parental responsibility and children in conflict with the law.

In 2023, Haimbe presented the Human Rights Commission Bill, 2023, which sought to replace the existing legislation governing the Human Rights Commission of Zambia and strengthen its legal framework. Later that year, he presented the Judicial Training Institute of Zambia Bill, 2023, providing for the establishment of an institution responsible for professional training and continuing development within the justice sector.

Haimbe also reported that the government was reviewing other legislation, including the Cyber Security and Cyber Crimes Act, 2021, whose legal status was the subject of litigation. The reforms undertaken during his tenure were presented by the government as part of a wider programme to strengthen the rule of law, human rights protections and the administration of justice.

=== Minister of Foreign Affairs and International Cooperation ===
Following the resignation of Stanley Kakubo in December 2023, Haimbe served as acting Minister of Foreign Affairs and International Cooperation while retaining his position as Minister of Justice. He was formally appointed to the foreign affairs portfolio on 5 June 2024, with Princess Kasune succeeding him as Minister of Justice.

As Minister of Foreign Affairs and International Cooperation, Haimbe promoted economic diplomacy as one of the main priorities of the ministry. In 2024, he launched a project supported by the United Nations Development Programme to strengthen foreign-policy and institutional capacity, including the development of an economic diplomacy strategy focused on trade and investment, carbon trading, critical minerals, technological advancement and environmental management. In September 2024, Haimbe represented Hichilema at the United Nations General Assembly in New York and addressed the general debate of its 79th session. During the visit, Zambia established diplomatic relations with Panama and the Dominican Republic through the signing of joint communiqués.

Haimbe also represented Zambia in multilateral and bilateral engagements on trade, investment, peace and security. In 2025, he promoted investment opportunities in mining, agriculture, energy, tourism and infrastructure, while encouraging the Zambian diaspora to invest in the country. In July 2025, Haimbe launched the Ministry of Foreign Affairs and International Cooperation's Service Delivery Charter, which set out standards for services including consular support, protocol and international cooperation. The ministry said the charter was intended to improve transparency, accountability and professionalism in the delivery of its services.

Haimbe also took part in efforts to strengthen Zambia's bilateral relations with neighbouring and international partners. In August 2025, he co-chaired the inaugural Zambia–Botswana Bi-National Commission, where the two countries signed agreements covering the commission's procedures, disaster-risk management and health cooperation.

In March 2026, Haimbe signed a memorandum of understanding with Sweden establishing a framework for regular political consultations between the two countries. The agreement was accompanied by the first session of the political consultations between the two governments. In April 2026, Haimbe held bilateral talks with Japanese Foreign Minister Toshimitsu Motegi during Motegi's working visit to Zambia. The talks focused on economic cooperation in areas including energy, agriculture and mining. The visit was the first by a Japanese foreign minister to Zambia in 42 years.

During his tenure, Haimbe also represented Zambia in discussions on reform of the international system. At the United Nations General Assembly in September 2025, he called for reform of the United Nations Security Council, including expanded permanent and non-permanent membership in line with the Ezulwini Consensus and the Sirte Declaration. Haimbe left the ministry following the dissolution of Parliament in May 2026. In his farewell remarks to ministry staff, he cited the advancement of peace, security and stability and the promotion of economic diplomacy among the ministry's work during his tenure.

=== Withdrawal from the 2026 election ===
On 18 May 2026, Haimbe announced that he would not seek re-election to the National Assembly in the 2026 general election. He withdrew from the UPND nomination contest for Lusaka Central and endorsed Msaiwale Mlewa as the party's candidate. Haimbe's parliamentary term ended following the dissolution of the National Assembly in preparation for the 2026 general election. He also left the Ministry of Foreign Affairs and International Cooperation at the end of Hichilema's first term.

=== Return to government ===
On 14 September 2026, President Hakainde Hichilema nominated Haimbe as a member of Parliament and re-appointed him Minister of Foreign Affairs and International Cooperation. He was subsequently sworn in as part of Hichilema's second-term cabinet.
