= Felix Mutati =

Zambian politician (born 1959)

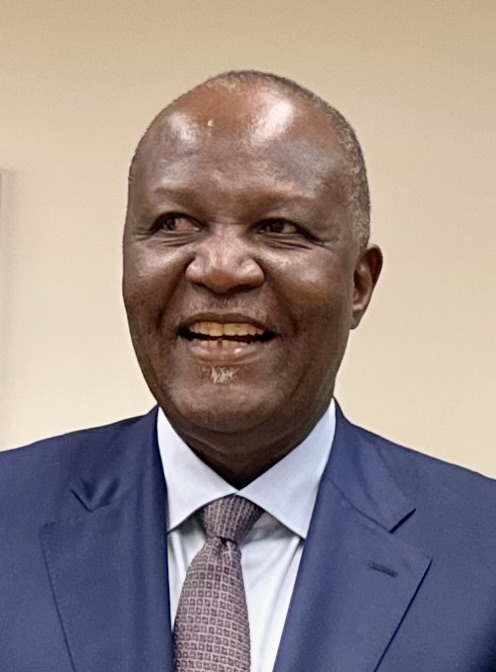

Ministry of Technology and Science
- Incumbent
- Assumed office 17 September 2021
- President: Hakainde Hichilema

Minister of Works and Supply
- In office 14 February 2018 – 6 November 2018
- President: Edgar Lungu
- Preceded by: Mathew Nkhuwa
- Succeeded by: Mutotwe Kafwaya

Minister of Finance
- In office 15 September 2016 – 14 February 2018
- President: Edgar Lungu
- Preceded by: Alexander Chikwanda
- Succeeded by: Margaret Mwanakatwe

Member of Parliament
- In office January 2002 – September 2016
- Constituency: Lunte

Minister of Commerce, Trade and Industry
- In office 2004 – September 2011
- President: Levy Mwanawasa (2004-2008); Rupiah Banda (2008-2011)

Minister of Energy and Water Development
- In office 2002–2004
- President: Levy Mwanawasa

Personal details
- Born: 29 January 1959 (age 67) Northern Rhodesia
- Party: Movement for Multi-Party Democracy (2001–2020); Movement for Democratic Change (2020–present)
- Occupation: Accountant

Felix Chipota Mutati (born 29 January 1959) is a Zambian politician and leader of the Movement for Democratic Change (MDC) party. He is also a member of the UPND Alliance. He is the current Minister of Technology and Science, having been appointed by President Hakainde Hichilema. Previously, he served as the MP for Lunte constituency from 2001 to 2016 and served as the Minister of Energy and Water Development (2002 to 2004), Minister of Commerce, Trade and Industry (2004 to 2011), Minister of Finance (2016 to 2018) and Minister of Works and Supply (2018).

== Political career ==
Felix Mutati was elected as the Member of Parliament for Lunte constituency in three consecutive elections (2001, 2006 and 2011) as the Movement for Multi-Party Democracy candidate.

Under the presidency of the Movement for Multi-Party Democracy (Levy Mwanawasa and Rupiah Banda), Mutati served as the Minister of Energy and Water Development from 2002 to 2004 and as the Minister of Commerce, Trade and Industry from 2004 to 2011.

Under the presidency of Edgar Lungu, Mutati served as Minister of Finance from September 2016 to February 2018 and as Minister of Works and Supply from February 2018 to November 2018 as a nominated member of parliament.

In May 2016, a group of MMD members elected Mutati as party president at a convention at the Mulungushi Rock of Authority in Kabwe, while other members continued supporting Nevers Mumba. Mumba took this matter of who is the legitimate party president to court, which prevented the party from participating in the 2016 general election.

On 9 November 2019, High Court Judge Sharon Newa sitting in Lusaka ruled that the convention that elected Mutati as Party President was illegal and all decisions made between then and that date were declared null and void, confirming that Mumba was the president of the party and Mutati was an expelled member.

On 12 October 2020, Mutati disassociated with the Movement for Multi-Party Democracy and launched a new political party, the Movement for Democratic Change (MDC).

On 7 May 2021, the MDC decided to join a newly-formed alliance named the Zambia We Want Alliance (ZWW) together with the Zambia Shall Prosper Movement (ZSP; led by Kelvin Fube Bwalya), the Zambians for Empowerment and Development (ZED; led by Ernest Mwansa) and Movement for Change and Equality (MCE; led by Kaluba Simuyemba). Two days later, the Zambia We Want Alliance, which includes the MDC, merged into the UPND Alliance, another alliance of political parties, and supported the presidency of Hakainde Hichilema, declaring that the MDC would not field its own candidate at the 2021 general election. After the UPND won that election, Mutati was appointed the Minister of Technology and Science and was therefore a nominated member of Parliament.

In January 2026, Mutati confirmed that his party (MDC) would support Hichilema for re-election at the 2026 general election together with other UPND Alliance members. After the UPND won the presidential election in August 2026, Mutati was nominated as a member of parliament again and re-appointed as the Minister of Technology and Science in October 2026.
