= Luampa District =

Coordinates: 15°00′S 22°30′E

- District
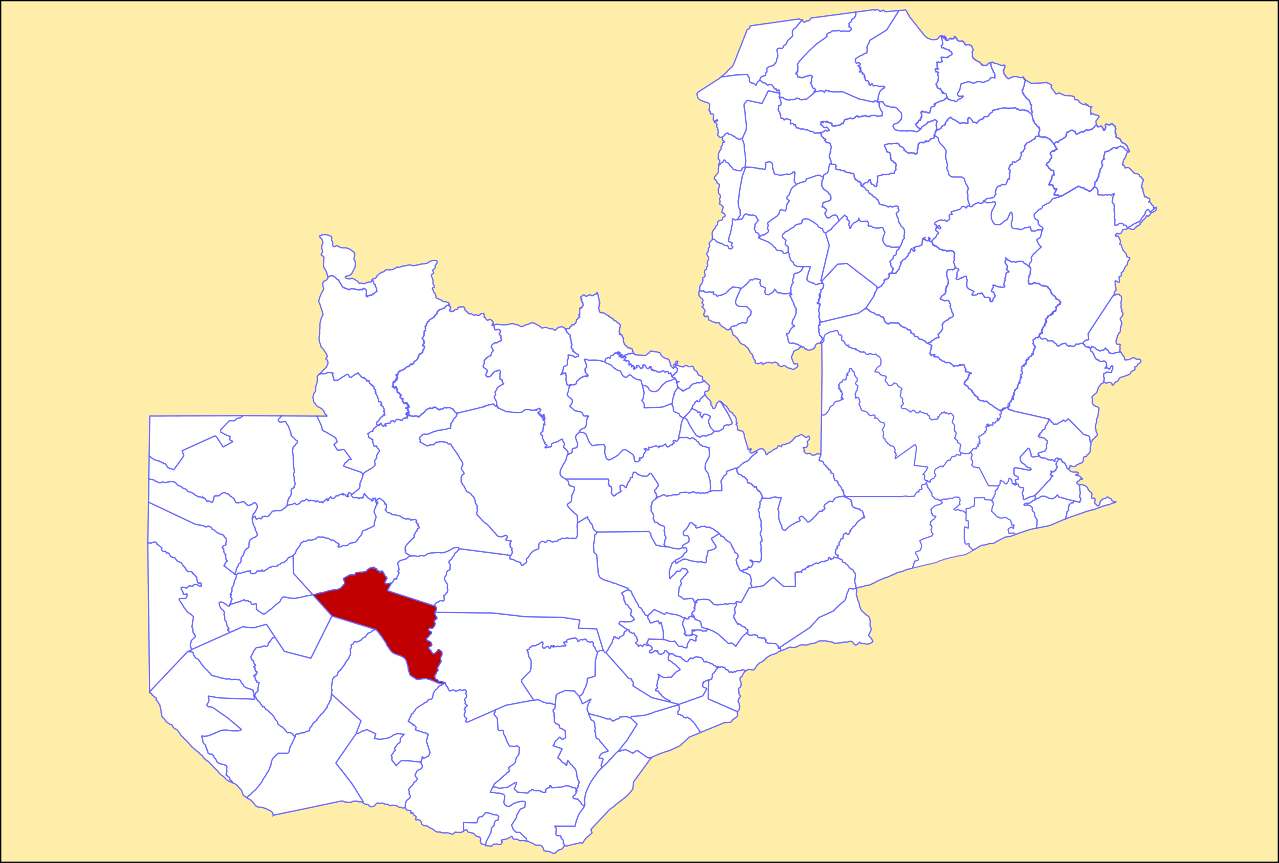
- District location in Zambia
- Country: Zambia
- Province: Western Province

Area
  - Total: 10,770.7 km^{2} (4,158.6 sq mi)

Population (2022)
  - Total: 61,023
  - Density: 5.6656/km^{2} (14.674/sq mi)
- Time zone: UTC+2 (CAT)

Luampa District is a district of Zambia, located in Western Province. It was separated from Kaoma District in 2012. As of the 2022 Zambian Census, the district had a population of 61,023 people.
