= Elvis Nkandu =

Zambian politician (born 1971)

Honorable Minister Elvis Nkandu

Minister of Information and Media
- Incumbent
- Assumed office October 2026
- Preceded by: Cornelius Mweetwa

Member of Parliament
- Incumbent
- Assumed office August 2021
- Preceded by: Maxas Ng'onga
- Constituency: Kaputa

Minister of Youth, Sport and Arts
- In office September 2021 – May 2026
- Preceded by: Emmanuel Mulenga
- Succeeded by: Likando Mufalali

Personal details
- Born: 31 December 1971 (age 54) Zambia
- Party: United Party for National Development

Elvis Chishala Nkandu (born 31 December 1971) is a Zambian politician who currently serves as the Minister of Information and Media and as the member of parliament for Kaputa. He served as Minister of Youth, Sport and Arts from September 2021 to May 2026.

== Career ==
He is a member of the United Party for National Development (UPND). In August 2021, he contested and won the parliamentary seat for Kaputa. He was appointed as Minister of Youth, Sport and Arts by President Hichilema in his first cabinet the following month.

On 5 March 2025, Nkandu was appointed as the UPND Deputy Spokesperson. At the 2026 general election in August 2026, Nkandu was re-elected as the Kaputa member of parliament and in October 2026, he was appointed as the Minister of Information and Media.
