= Ministry of Technology and Science (Zambia) =

Government ministry of Zambia

Ministry of Technology and Science of Zambia

Agency overview
- Type: Constituent Department of the State Council (cabinet-level executive department)
- Jurisdiction: Government of Zambia
- Headquarters: Lusaka
- Minister responsible: Minister of Technology and Science

The Ministry of Technology and Science is the ministry of the government of the Republic of Zambia which coordinates science and technology activities in Zambia. The office is located in Lusaka. The ministry is responsible for formulating guidelines and related policies for science and technology in Zambia, development as well as promoting basic and special research on science and technology.

== List of Ministers ==
Minister	Party	Term start	Term end
Minister of Technology and Science
Felix Mutati	Movement for Democratic Change	2021	2026
