= Ministry of Green Economy and Environment =

Government ministry of Zambia

- Coat of arms of Zambia

Ministry overview
- Formed: 2021
- Jurisdiction: Government of Zambia
- Headquarters: Lusaka, Zambia
- Ministry executive: Permanent Secretary
- Parent Ministry: Government of Zambia
- Child Ministry: Zambia Environmental Management Agency
- Website: www.mgee.gov.zm

The Ministry of Green Economy and Environment (MGEE) is a government ministry of the Republic of Zambia responsible for environmental management, climate change policy, and the promotion of a green economy. The ministry was established in 2021 as part of a restructuring of government ministries aimed at strengthening environmental governance and climate action in Zambia.

The ministry is headed by the cabinet-level Minister of Green Economy and Environment.

== History ==
The creation of the ministry was announced by President Hakainde Hichilema in September 2021 during a restructuring of government following the general election. The new ministry consolidated environmental and climate-related functions that had previously been spread across several ministries and agencies.

== Mandate ==
The ministry is responsible for coordinating national policy and programmes related to environmental protection, climate change, and sustainable development. Its functions include:

- Promoting sustainable environmental management and conservation
- Coordinating climate change mitigation and adaptation policies
- Supporting the development of a green and low-carbon economy
- Coordinating Zambia's participation in international climate agreements
- Mobilising climate finance and supporting green investment initiatives

The ministry also serves as a focal point for Zambia's engagement with international environmental and climate frameworks, including the United Nations Framework Convention on Climate Change.

== Structure ==
The ministry operates from its headquarters in Lusaka and works with several departments and statutory bodies involved in environmental and climate governance. These include:

- Zambia Environmental Management Agency (ZEMA)
- Forestry Department
- Department of Climate Change
- Meteorological Department

The ministry collaborates with other government institutions, development partners, and international organisations on environmental and climate programmes.

== List of ministers ==
Minister	Term start	Term end
Collins Nzovu	2021	2024
Mike Mposha	2024	2026
Gilbert Siame	2026	

== See also ==
- Government of Zambia
- Cabinet of Zambia
- Climate change in Zambia
