= Ministry of Youth, Sport and Arts =

Government ministry of Zambia

The Ministry of Youth, Sport and Arts, formerly known as the Ministry of Sport, Youth and Child Development, is a ministry in Zambia.

The Child Development function was part of the Ministry of Gender until 2016. The Arts function was part of the Ministry of Tourism until 2021.

== List of ministers ==
| Minister | Party | Term start | Term end |
|---|---|---|---|
| Baldwin Nkumbula | Movement for Multi-Party Democracy | 1991 | 1992 |
| Amusaa Mwanamwambwa | Movement for Multi-Party Democracy | 1994 | 1995 |
| Abel Chambeshi | Movement for Multi-Party Democracy | 1999 | 1999 |
| Peter Chintala | Movement for Multi-Party Democracy | 2001 | 2001 |
| Moses Mawere | Patriotic Front | 2016 | 2019 |
| Emmanuel Mulenga | Patriotic Front | 2019 | 2021 |
| Elvis Chishala Nkandu | United Party for National Development | 2021 | 2026 |
