= Ministry of Community Development and Social Services =

Government ministry of Zambia

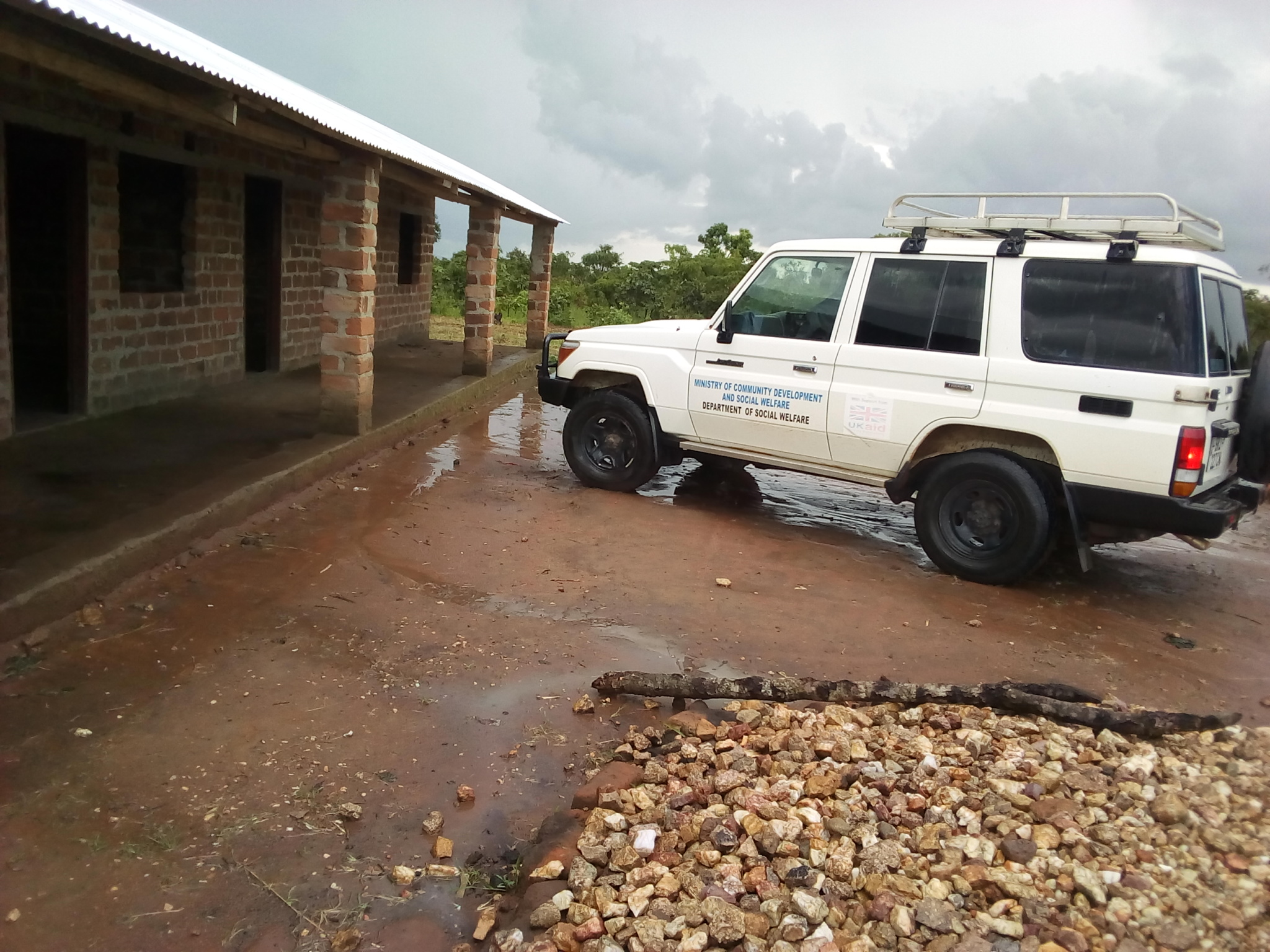
Ministry vehicle taking social services in rural areas

The Ministry of Community Development and Social Services is a ministry in Zambia. It is headed by the Minister of Community Development and Social Services.

== List of ministers ==
Minister	Party	Term start	Term end
Minister of Community Development and Social Services
Gabriel Maka	Movement for Multi-Party Democracy	1991	1993
Nakatindi Wina	Movement for Multi-Party Democracy	1993	1994
Minister of Community Development, Mother and Child Health
Emerine Kabanshi	Patriotic Front	2014	2016
Ministry of Community Development and Social Welfare
Emerine Kabanshi	Patriotic Front	2016	2018
Olipa Phiri	Patriotic Front	2018	2019
Kampamba Mulenga	Patriotic Front	2019	2021
Minister of Community Development and Social Services
Doreen Mwamba	United Party for National Development	2021	2026

=== Deputy ministers ===
Deputy Minister	Party	Term start	Term end
Deputy Minister of Community Development and Social Welfare
Friday Malwa	Movement for Multi-Party Democracy	2008	2011
