= Mutale Nalumango =

Vice President of Zambia since 2021

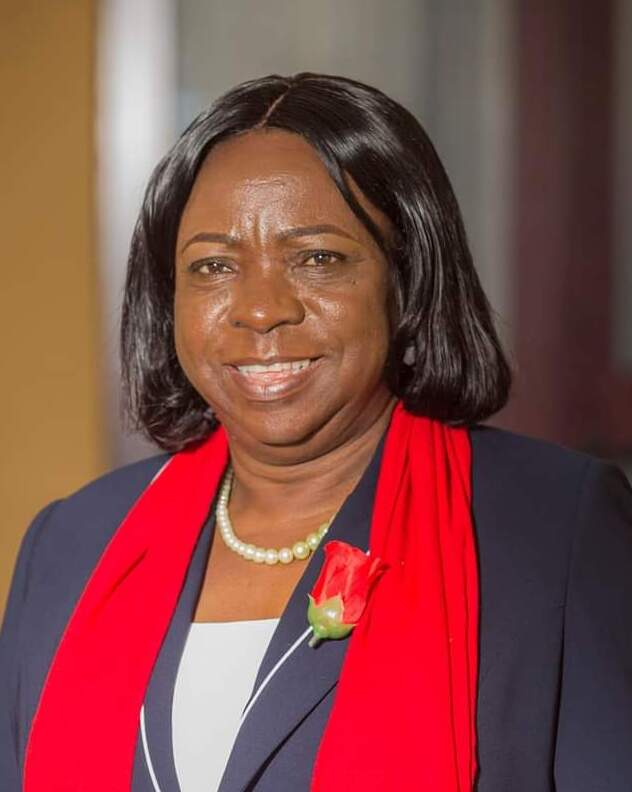
- Nalumango in 2020

14th Vice President of Zambia
- Incumbent
- Assumed office 24 August 2021
- President: Hakainde Hichilema
- Preceded by: Inonge Wina

Deputy Speaker of the National Assembly of Zambia
- In office 2006–2011
- President: Levy Mwanawasa; Rupiah Banda
- Speaker: Amusaa Mwanamwambwa

Member of the National Assembly of Zambia
- In office 27 December 2001 – 20 September 2011
- Preceded by: Paul Bupe
- Succeeded by: Maxas Ng'onga
- Constituency: Kaputa

Personal details
- Born: 1 January 1955 (age 71) Kaputa, Northern Rhodesia
- Party: MMD (2001-2013); UPND (2013-present)
- Spouse: Max Lubinda Nalumango
- Education: Cavendish University Zambia

W.K. Mutale Nalumango (born 1 January 1955) is a Zambian educator and politician. She currently serves as the 14th Vice President of Zambia, having been elected to the position in August 2021. Nalumango is only the second woman to hold this position, which is considered one of the most significant political roles in the country.

== Career ==
Mutale, born in 1955 in Kaputa, Northern Rhodesia, is a teacher by profession. She served as Secondary Schools’ Teachers Union of Zambia vice-president before entering politics in 2001 and was elected as member of parliament for Kaputa constituency at the 2001 general election as the Movement for Multi-Party Democracy candidate.

Under Levy Mwanawasa's first term as President, Nalumango served in several positions, including as the Labour and Social Security minister and Information and Broadcasting Services minister. As Information and Broadcasting Services minister, her actions raised concerns on press freedom in Zambia after police raided Richard Sakala's Omega TV following a letter written by then-solicitor general Sunday Nkonde in which he stated that the TV station was operating illegally and needed to be shut down.

After being re-elected as member of parliament for Kaputa in 2006, she stood for deputy speaker of the National Assembly of Zambia and won unopposed, becoming the first female to hold that position. At the 2011 elections she lost her parliamentary seat to Maxas Ng'onga of the Patriotic Front. She then decided to join the United Party for National Development (UPND) where she was appointed the party's national chairwoman in 2013, a position she held until February 2021 when she became the vice president of the party.

At the 2021 general election, she became the Vice President of Zambia after the UPND won the presidential election, becoming only the second woman after her predecessor (Inonge Wina) to hold the position. At the 2026 general election, she maintained her position as Vice President of Zambia after the UPND won the presidential election.

Political offices
Preceded by Inonge Wina	Vice-President of Zambia; 2021–present	Incumbent
