= Ministry of Finance and National Planning (Zambia) =

Government ministry of Zambia

The Ministry of Finance and National Planning is a ministry in Zambia. It is headed by the Minister of Finance, who is responsible for public finances.

== Financial Secretaries ==
- K. R. Tucker, 1938-1941
- G. E. Thornton, 1946-1948
- R. M. Taylor, 1952-1953
- Ralph Nicholson, 1956-1958

== Ministers of Finance ==
- Ralph Nicholson, 1959-1961
- A. E. Lewis, 1963
- Trevor Gardner, 1959–1964
- Arthur Wina, 1964-1967
- Elijah Mudenda, 1967-1968
- Simon Kapwepwe, 1968-1969
- Elijah Mudenda, 1969-1970
- John Mwanakatwe, 1971-1973
- Alexander Chikwanda, 1973-1976
- John Mwanakatwe, 1976-1978
- Joshua Lumina, 1979
- Kebby Musokotwane, 1980-1982
- Luke Mwananshiku, 1983-1985
- Lavu Mulimba, 1985-1986
- Basil Kabwe, 1986-1988
- Gibson Chigaga, 1989-1990
- Rabbison M. Chongo, 1991
- Emmanuel Kasonde, 1991-1993
- Ronald Penza, 1993-1998
- Edith Nawakwi, 1998-1999
- Katele Kalumba, 1999-2001
- Emmanuel Kasonde, 2002-2004
- N’gandu Peter Magande, 2004-2008
- Situmbeko Musokotwane, 2008-2011
- Alexander Chikwanda, 2011-2016
- Felix Mutati, 2016-2018
- Margaret Mwanakatwe, 2018-2019
- Bwalya Ng’andu, 2019-2021
- Situmbeko Musokotwane, 2021-2026

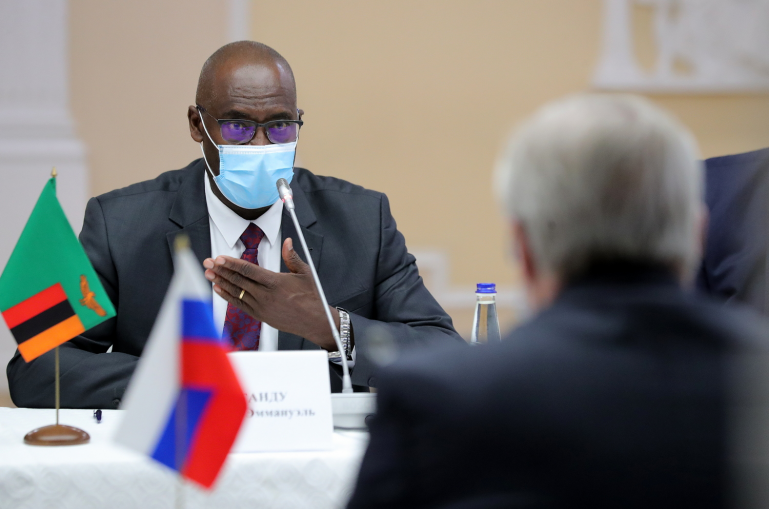
Minister of Finance Bwalya Ng’andu in Rostov Oblast
