= Ministry of Fisheries and Livestock (Zambia) =

Government ministry of Zambia

Republic of Zambia Ministry of Fisheries and Livestock
- Government of Zambia Seal

Agency overview
- Jurisdiction: Government of Zambia
- Headquarters: Lusaka, Zambia

The Ministry of Fisheries and Livestock (MOFL) is a ministry of the government of the Republic of Zambia whose role is ensuring the sustainable utilisation of fisheries and livestock. It was created in 2015 when the Ministry of Agriculture and Livestock was split into two (the Ministry of Agriculture and the Ministry of Fisheries and Livestock).

== List of ministers ==
Minister of Fisheries and Livestock
Greyford Monde	Patriotic Front	October 2015	May 2016
Micheal Zondani Katambo	Patriotic Front	September 2016	February 2018
Kampamba Mulenga	Patriotic Front	February 2018	July 2019
Nkandu Luo	Patriotic Front	July 2019	May 2021
Makozo Chikote	United Party for National Development	September 2021	July 2024
Peter Kapala	United Party for National Development	July 2024	May 2026
Olive Chiboola	United Party for National Development	October 2026	

== Directorates ==
- Zambia Fisheries Research Institute
- Department of Fisheries
- Zambia Fisheries Development Corporation
