= Peter Kapala =

Zambian politician

Minister of Electricity
- Incumbent
- Assumed office October 2026

Member of the National Assembly for Chifunabuli South
- Incumbent
- Assumed office 16 August 2026
- Preceded by: Seat created

Minister of Energy
- In office 7 September 2021 – 19 July 2024
- President: Hakainde Hichilema
- Preceded by: Mathew Nkhuwa
- Succeeded by: Makozo Chikote

Minister of Fisheries and Livestock
- In office 20 July 2024 – 15 May 2026
- Preceded by: Makozo Chikote
- Succeeded by: Olive Chiboola

Personal details
- Born: Livingstone, Zambia
- Party: United Party for National Development
- Education: University of Zambia
- Occupation: Politician, engineer

Peter Chibwe Kapala (born in 28 March 1958) is a Zambian politician. He is the current Minister of Electricity and the current member of parliament for Chifunabuli South. He was the Minister of Fisheries and Livestock from 20 July 2024 to 15 May 2026 and the Minister of Energy from 7 September 2021 to 19 July 2024 as a nominated member of parliament. He is a member of the United Party for National Development (UPND). He holds a Master's in Civil and Structural Engineering and a Technician Certificate.

== Political career ==
Peter Kapala was nominated to parliament in September 2021 by President Hakainde Hichilema and was appointed as the Minister of Energy. On 19 July 2024, Kapala was appointed as the Minister of Fisheries and Livestock, thereby exchanging ministries with Makozo Chikote.

In May 2026, the United Party for National Development adopted Peter Kapala to be their parliamentary candidate in Chifunabuli South at the 2026 general election and he was elected at the election in August 2026. In October 2026, he was appointed as the Minister of Electricity.
