= Ministry of Tourism (Zambia) =

Government ministry of Zambia

The Ministry of Tourism is a ministry in Zambia responsible for the portfolio functions of tourism and culture. It is headed by the Minister of Tourism.

In 2002 the Ministry of Tourism was merged with the Ministry of Environment and Natural Resources to form the Ministry of Tourism, Environment and Natural Resources. However, Tourism was later merged into the Foreign Affairs ministry. In 2011 Tourism was split out from the Foreign ministry and merged with the Art portfolio to form the Ministry of Tourism and Arts. Arts was removed in 2021 and moved to the Ministry of Youth, Sport and Arts.

The Ministry has several departments including the Department of Culture and Traditional Affairs, the Department of the Hostels Board of Management, and the Department of National Parks and Wildlife (DNPW), which is mandated to manage and conserve wildlife in Zambia and to administer national parks and game management areas. The ministry oversees several statutory bodies, including the National Heritage Conservation Commission, the National Museum Board, the Zambia Institute for Tourism and Hospitality Studies and the Zambia Tourism Agency.

== List of ministers ==
Minister	Party	Term start	Term end
Minister of Natural Resources and Tourism
Durton Konoso	United National Independence Party		
Minister of Information, Broadcasting and Tourism
Sikota Wina	United National Independence Party	1968	1973
Minister of Tourism
Gabriel Maka	Movement for Multiparty Democracy	1995	1996
Amusaa Mwanamwambwa	Movement for Multiparty Democracy	1996	1998
Minister of Tourism, Environment and Natural Resources
Catherine Namugala	Movement for Multiparty Democracy	2008	2011
Minister of Tourism and Arts
Sylvia Masebo	Patriotic Front	2012	2014
Jean Kapata	Patriotic Front	2014	2016
Charles Banda	Patriotic Front	2016	2019
Ronald Chitotela	Patriotic Front	2019	2021
Minister of Tourism
Rodney Sikumba	United Party for National Development	2021	2026

=== Deputy ministers ===
Deputy Minister	Party	Term start	Term end
Minister of State for Tourism
Nakatindi Wina	Movement for Multi-Party Democracy	1992	1993
Deputy Minister of Tourism
Amusaa Mwanamwambwa	Movement for Multiparty Democracy	1993	1994
Deputy Minister of Tourism and Arts
Esther Banda	Patriotic Front	2015	2016
