= Ministry of Water Development and Sanitation (Zambia) =

Government ministry of Zambia

- Coat of arms of Zambia

Agency overview
- Formed: 1964
- Jurisdiction: Government of Zambia
- Headquarters: Lusaka, Zambia
- Minister responsible: Minister for Water Development and Sanitation

The Ministry of Water Development and Sanitation is a government ministry of Zambia that is responsible to provide effective, sustainable and quality water supply and sanitation to the people of Zambia.

== History ==
The Ministry was established in 1960s by the Government of Zambia as the Department of Water Development and Sanitation under the Ministry of Water Resources.

== Organisational structure ==
The Ministry of Water Development and Sanitation has several departments and subdivisions to facilitate and implement its work:

- Kariba Dam
- Project Implementation Directorate
- Rural Water Supply and Sanitation Fund Development Board
