= List of bridges in Zambia =

== Historical or architectural interest bridges ==
	Name	Distinction	Length	Type	Carries Crosses	Opened	Location	Province	Ref.
1	Kariba Dam Suspension Bridge dismantled	Temporary bridge used for the construction of the Kariba Dam; Span : 424 m (1,391 ft)	219 m (719 ft)	Suspension; Towerless, steel truss deck	Road bridge Zambezi	1958	Siavonga–Kariba; 16°31′17.5″S 28°45′45.6″E	Southern Province; Zambia	
2	Chinyingi Suspension Bridge		300 m (980 ft)	Suspension; Steel	Footbridge; Zambezi	1977	Chinyingi; 13°21′10.5″S 23°00′44.8″E	North-Western Province	

== Major bridges ==
	Name	Span	Length	Type	Carries Crosses	Opened	Location	Province	Ref.
1	Otto Beit Bridge	328 m (1,076 ft)	369 m (1,211 ft)	Suspension; Steel truss deck, steel pylons	R3 road Zambezi	1939	Chirundu, Zambia–Chirundu, Zimbabwe; 16°02′16.6″S 28°51′08.2″E	Southern Province; Zambia	
2	Luangwa Bridge	222 m (728 ft)	302 m (991 ft)	Cable-stayed; Composite steel/concrete deck, steel pylons 40+222+40	Great East Road; Luangwa River	1968	Chongwe District–Petauke District; 14°58′33.1″S 30°12′43.6″E	Lusaka Province; Eastern Province	
3	Second Chirundu Bridge	160 m (520 ft)	400 m (1,300 ft)	Box girder Prestressed concrete 119+160+119	R3 road Zambezi	2002	Chirundu, Zambia–Chirundu, Zimbabwe; 16°02′18.8″S 28°51′05.8″E	Southern Province; Zambia	
4	Victoria Falls Bridge	156 m (512 ft)	198 m (650 ft)	Arch; Steel deck arch	A8 road Zambezi	1905	Victoria Falls–Livingstone; 17°55′42.2″S 25°51′25.3″E	Southern Province; Zambia	
5	Kazungula Bridge	129 m (423 ft)(x5)	923 m (3,028 ft)	Extradosed; Concrete box girder deck, 6 concrete pylons Rail-road bridge 54+85+5x129+85+54	A33 road M10 road Mosetse–Kazungula–Livingstone Railway; Zambezi	2020	Kazungula–Kasane; 17°47′28.4″S 25°15′45.0″E	Southern Province; Zambia	
6	Sioma Bridge	120 m (390 ft)	252 m (827 ft)	Box girder Prestressed concrete 66+120+66	Road bridge Zambezi	2016	Sioma; 16°40′18.7″S 23°37′37.6″E	Western Province	
7	Katima Mulilo Bridge		900 m (3,000 ft)	Box girder Prestressed concrete	Trans-Caprivi highway Zambezi	2004	Sesheke–Katima Mulilo; 17°28′18.9″S 24°14′58.5″E	Western Province; Zambia	

== See also ==
- Transport in Zambia
- Roads in Zambia
- Rail transport in Zambia
- Geography of Zambia
- List of rivers of Zambia
- List of crossings of the Zambezi River
