= Chirundu =

Chirundu may refer to:

- Chirundu, Zambia, town on the northwest bank of the Zambezi river
- Chirundu, Zimbabwe, village on the southeast bank of the Zambezi river
- Chirundu Bridge, connecting Chirundu, Zambia with Chirundu, Zimbabwe
- Chirundu (constituency), a parliamentary constituency in Zambia
- Chirundu District, a district in Zambia
