= Katete (disambiguation) =

Katete is a village in Zambia.

Katete may also refer to:

- Katete (Uganda)

== Zambia ==
- Katete District
- Katete North
- Katete South
