= Nyimba =

Nyimba can refer to:

- Nyimba District, district in Eastern Province, Zambia
  - Nyimba (constituency), former constituency of the National Assembly of Zambia
  - Nyimba North, current constituency of the National Assembly of Zambia covering the northern part of the district
  - Nyimba South, current constituency of the National Assembly of Zambia covering the southern part of the district
- Oyo Nyimba, better known as Rukidi IV of Tooro (1992–2026), king of the Tooro Kingdom in Uganda
