= George Mwanza =

Zambian politician (born 1994)

Member of the National Assembly for Chipata Central
- Incumbent
- Assumed office 17 August 2026
- Preceded by: Reuben Mtolo Phiri

Mayor of Chipata District
- In office 13 August 2021 – 15 May 2026
- Preceded by: Alex Tembo
- Succeeded by: Johnstone Silungwe

Personal details
- Born: January 18, 1994 (age 32) Chipata, Zambia
- Party: Independent (2021 - 2026) UPND (2026 - present)

George Mwanza (born 18 January 1994) is a Zambian politician who currently serves as the member of parliament for Chipata Central, having been elected in August 2026. He served as the mayor of Chipata District from 2021 to 2026, becoming the youngest Zambian elected to the position of mayor since the nation's Independence in 1964.

== Personal life ==
Mwanza was born in 1994 in Chipata, Eastern Province. He attended Chizongwe Technical High School.

In 2023, Mwanza survived a road accident during a visit to Petauke.

== Political career ==
During the August 2021 elections in Zambia, Mwanza was elected as mayor of Chipata District, the capital of Zambia's Eastern Province. He was elected on an independent ticket.

Mwanza is also a member of the Young Elected Officials of Africa Network where in October 2022, he was elected Vice-President for Southern Africa.

In March 2026, Mwanza confirmed that he plans to contest for the position of Chipata Central member of Parliament at the 2026 general election to happen in August that year. On 26 March 2026, Mwanza joined the United Party for National Development and therefore was no-longer an independent politician. Mwanza was adopted as the UPND candidate to contest in Chipata Central and he was elected.
