= Mkaika (constituency) =

Zambian National Assembly constituency

Mkaika is a constituency of the National Assembly of Zambia. It covers Katete and Mpoto in Katete District of Eastern Province.

== List of MPs ==
Election year	MP	Party
Katete North
1968	Charles Thornicroft	United National Independence Party
Seat abolished (merged into Katete)
1983	Gibson Chigaga	United National Independence Party
1988	Gibson Chigaga	United National Independence Party
Mkaika
1991	Josephat Mulenga	United National Independence Party
1996	Chikakula Banda	Movement for Multi-Party Democracy
2001	Zawe Mwanza	Forum for Democracy and Development
2006	David Phiri	Movement for Multi-Party Democracy
2011	David Phiri	Movement for Multi-Party Democracy
2013 (by-election)	Peter Phiri	Movement for Multi-Party Democracy
2016	Peter Phiri	Movement for Multi-Party Democracy
2021	Peter Phiri	Patriotic Front
2026	Mustapher Banda	National Reconciliation Party for Unity and Prosperity
