= Reuben Mtolo Phiri =

Zambian politician

Minister of Agriculture
- In office 7 September 2021 – 15 May 2026
- President: Hakainde Hichilema
- Preceded by: Micheal Zondani Katambo
- Succeeded by: Moses Moyo

Member of the National Assembly for Chipata Central
- In office August 2021 – 15 May 2026
- Preceded by: Moses Mawere
- In office September 2011 – May 2016
- Preceded by: Lameck Mangani
- Succeeded by: Moses Mawere

Personal details
- Born: 11 November 1964 (age 61) Lusaka, Zambia
- Party: Movement for Multi-Party Democracy (2011-2021); United Party for National Development (2021-)
- Education: University of Zambia
- Occupation: Politician

Reuben Mtolo Phiri is a Zambian politician who served as the Minister of Agriculture from 2021 to 2026 and was the member of parliament for Chipata Central on two occasions (2011 to 2016 and 2021 to 2026). He is currently a member of the United Party for National Development (UPND) and previously associated with the Movement for Multi-Party Democracy. He was born on 11 November 1964.

== Political career ==
Reuben Mtolo Phiri stood as the Movement for Multi-Party Democracy (MMD) candidate for member of parliament (MP) in Chipata Central at the 2011 general election and he was elected. He stood again as the MMD candidate for MP in Chipata Central at the 2016 general election and he finished second to Moses Mawere.

At the 2021 general election, he stood as the United Party for National Development (UPND) candidate for MP in Chipata Central and he was re-elected to parliament. After the UPND won the presidential election at the 2021 general election, he was appointed as the Minister of Agriculture in September 2021 by president Hakainde Hichilema.

In April 2026, the Chipata Central constituency was split into two constituencies (Chipata Central and Chipata North). Reuben Mtolo Phiri decided to stand as the UPND candidate for MP in Chipata North at the 2026 general election and he finished second, with Jackson Ngoma of the National Reconciliation Party for Unity and Prosperity winning the parliamentary seat.
