= T6 road (Zambia) =

Road in Zambia

T6 Road

Route information
- Maintained by Road Development Agency and Lutembwe Construction Company Limited
- Length: 55 km (34 mi)

Major junctions
- North-west end: T4 in Katete
- South-east end: Chanida Border with Mozambique

Location
- Country: Zambia
- Provinces: Eastern Province
- Major cities: Katete

Highway system
- Transport in Zambia
← T5	→ M1

The T6 road is a road in the Eastern Province of Zambia. It is a branch of the Great East Road and it is the primary road used to access Northern Mozambique from Zambia. It connects Katete with the Chanida Border with Mozambique.

In October 2023, the Government of Zambia signed a Public–private partnership (concession) deal with Lutembwe Construction Company Limited for the reconstruction and maintenance of the entire 55 kilometres of road from Katete to the Mozambique border at Chanida. It is expected to cost $79.8 million and the concession agreement is for a period of 25 years (up to 2048). Plans include rehabilitating the entire road in the first 2 years and maintaining it thereafter, constructing a toll plaza on the road and constructing border post infrastructure at Chanida.

== Route ==
At the town of Katete, 80 kilometres west of Chipata, 490 kilometres east of Lusaka, at a junction with the T4 (Great East Road), begins the road going south-east towards the border with Mozambique. The T6 road is 55 kilometres in length from Katete, passing through Chilembwe and Mlolo (through the western side of Chadiza District), to the Chanida Border with Mozambique. The long road ahead through Mozambique (the N9 route) provides access to the city of Tete. The border on the Mozambique side is named Cassacatiza.

== See also ==
- Transport in Zambia
- Roads in Zambia
