= Chipata Central =

Constituency in Zambia

Chipata Central Constituency
- Constituency
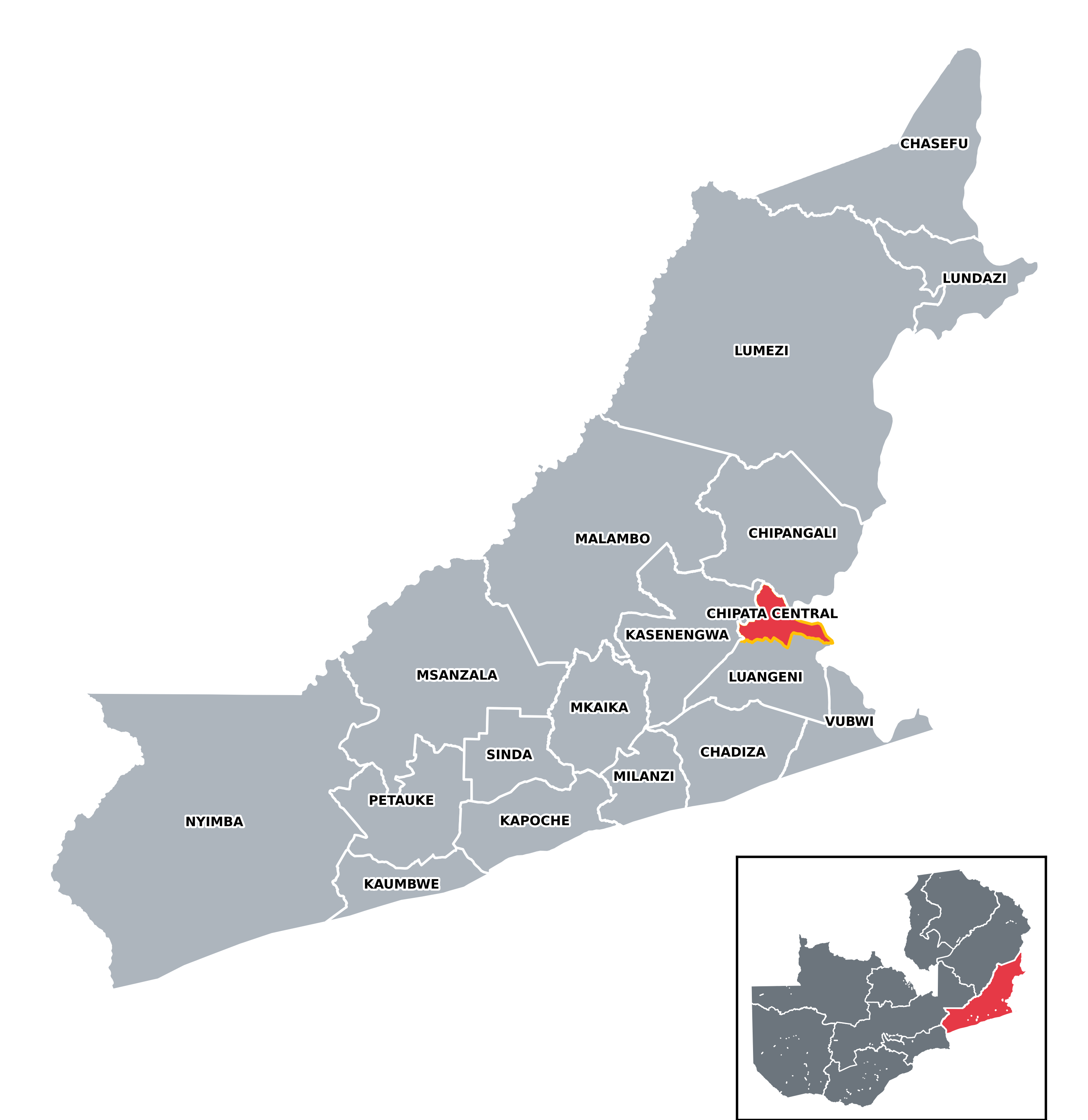
- Map showing Chipata Central constituency in the Republic of Zambia
- Country: Zambia
- Province: Eastern Province
- District: Chipata District

Chipata Central is a constituency of the National Assembly of Zambia. It covers the central and southern part of the city of Chipata in Chipata District of Eastern Province.

== List of MPs ==
Election year	MP	Party
Fort Jameson
1964	Wesley Nyirenda	United National Independence Party
Seat abolished (split into Chipata East, Chipata North and Chipata West)
Chipata
1973	Josiah Lungu	United National Independence Party
1978	Chiwala Banda	United National Independence Party
1983	Reuben Phiri	United National Independence Party
1988	Teddy Mbewe	United National Independence Party
1991	Winright Ngondo	United National Independence Party
1996	Rosemary Malama	Movement for Multi-Party Democracy
Chipata Central
2001	Mathew Mwale	Forum for Democracy and Development
2006	Lameck Mangani	Movement for Multi-Party Democracy
2011	Reuben Mtolo	Movement for Multi-Party Democracy
2016	Moses Mawere	Patriotic Front
2021	Reuben Mtolo	United Party for National Development
2026	George Mwanza	United Party for National Development
