= Yasu College of Education =

Zambian college

Yasu College of Education is a teachers college in Petauke town, Eastern Zambia. It offers secondary teacher's diploma courses.

Yasu College was registered by Reverend Leslie Herbert Zulu on 18 November 2015. It opened on 11 January 2016.
