= Chirundi =

Chirundi may refer to:

- Chirundu, Zambia
- Chirundu, Zimbabwe
