= Chipata North =

National Assembly constituency in Zambia

Chipata North is a constituency of the National Assembly of Zambia. It was created in 2026 by splitting Chipata Central. It covers the northern part of Chipata in Chipata District, including Masupe and Kapata.

== List of MPs ==
Election year	MP	Party
Chipata North
2026	Jackson Ngoma	National Reconciliation Party for Unity and Prosperity
