= Douglas Syakalima =

Zambian politician (born 1967)

Minister Skills and Higher Education
- Incumbent
- Assumed office 28 October 2026

Minister of Education
- In office September 2021 – 15 May 2026
- Preceded by: Dennis Wanchinga
- Succeeded by: Harry Kamboni

Member of Parliament for Chirundu
- In office August 2016 – 15 May 2026
- Preceded by: Office created

Member of Parliament for Siavonga
- In office December 2001 – September 2011
- Preceded by: Fredrick Hapunda
- Succeeded by: Kennedy Kamudulu

Personal details
- Party: United Party for National Development
- Education: University of Zambia (BA); Ulster University (MS)

Douglas Munsaka Syakalima (born 25 March 1967) is a Zambian politician from the United Party for National Development who is currently serving as the Minister of Skills and Higher Education. He has served as a member of the National Assembly of Zambia for both Siavonga and Chirundu and as the Minister of Education during his political career.

== Political career ==
Douglas Syakalima stood as the United Party for National Development parliamentary candidate in Siavonga constituency at the December 2001 general election and was elected. He stood again at the 2006 general election as the UPND candidate in Siavonga constituency and was re-elected. At the 2011 Zambian general election, the UPND adopted Kennedy Kaunda Hamudulu for the Siavonga constituency candidacy and so, Syakalima did not participate in the election.

In 2012, President Michael Sata decided to cut Siavonga District in order to create Chirundu District. This led to Siavonga constituency also being cut in order for Chirundu constituency to be created ahead of the 2016 general election. Syakalima decided that he would stand in Chirundu constituency and was adopted by the UPND to be their candidate there. He was elected as the first member of parliament for Chirundu constituency. He stood again in Chirundu constituency at the 2021 general election and retained his seat. After the UPND presidential candidate Hakainde Hichilema won the 2021 election, Syakalima was appointed as the Minister of Education in the government cabinet.

On 16 May 2026, Syakalima announced that he will retire from being a parliamentarian and will not participate in the 2026 general election. However, after the UPND won the presidential election in August 2026, Syakalima was nominated as a member of parliament by president Hakainde Hichilema and was appointed as the Minister of Skills and Higher Education on 28 October 2026.
