= Mwami, Zambia =

Border town in Eastern Province, Zambia

Mwami
- Location in Zambia
- Coordinates: 13°45′2.34″S 32°47′45.22″E
- Country: Zambia
- Province: Eastern Province
- District: Chipata District
- Elevation: 4,330 ft (1,320 m)

Population (2020)Estimate
  - Total: 1,939
- Time zone: UTC+2 (CAT)
- Climate: Cwa

Mwami is a town in the Eastern Province of Zambia in Chipata District, at the eastern end of the Great East Road at the international border with Malawi. It has a border post through which most trade between Zambia and Malawi passes, close to the Malawian city of Mchinji.

== Location ==
Mwami is located approximately 22 kilometres (14 mi) southeast of the district and provincial capital at Chipata. It is located approximately 581 kilometres (361 mi), east-north-east of Lusaka, the capital city of Zambia. This is approximately 145 kilometres (90 mi), by road west-north-west of Lilongwe, Malawi's capital city.

The geographical coordinates of the border post at Mwami are 13°45′2.34″S 32°47′45.22″E. (Latitude:-13.750650; Longitude:32.795894).

Mwami sits at an average elevation of 1,320 metres (4,331 ft) above mean sea level.

The Chipata–Mchinji extension to the Sena railway passes within 5 km northeast of Mwami but does not have a station or border post, since border formalities are carried out in Chipata and Mchinji. However as of February 2026 the line was not being used.

== One stop border crossing for road transport ==
The Malawi Revenue Authority with Zambian government agreement has built a one-stop road border crossing on the Malawian side of the border. It was built with US$5.8 million, borrowed from the African Development Bank. This reflects the importance of the route as part of the Nacala Logistics corridor providing access for Zambia to the Mozambican port of Nacala, on the Indian Ocean coast.

== Population ==
The population of Mwami was estimated at 1,760 in 2015, of whom 1,560 were residents and 200 were transients. By 2023, the town's total population, including transients, is expected to have increased to 2,266, as illustrated in the table below.

Year	Residents	Transients	Population
2015	1,560	200	1,760
2016	1594	200	1,794
2017	1,629	200	1,829
2018	1,665	200	1,865
2019	1,702	200	1,902
2020	1,739	200	1,939
2021	1,777	200	1977
2022	1,816	200	2,016
2023	2,066	200	2,266

== Water supply ==
A study carried out in 2015, observed that the town lacked a public piped water supply system and a public sewerage system. In addition, there were no public toilets in the town. The study determined that it would cost £300,735 to establish a public piped water and sewerage system in Mwami, Zambia.

== Health ==
Mwami Adventist Hospital, a 210-bed general hospital with an attached 50-bed extended care facility, owned and administered by the Adventist Church lies about 15 km south of the Border Post.

== See also ==
- Southern African Development Community
- Economy of Zambia
