= Chirundu Petrified Forest =

Coordinates: 16°01′41″S 28°42′00″E

The Chirundu Petrified Forest contains fossilised or petrified tree trunks of the Karoo age during the Jurassic period. The fossils found in the site are of coniferous trees which flourished in the area some 150 million years ago.

It is situated in the Southern Province of Zambia 21 kilometres from Chirundu.

The site is part of the World Heritage Tentative List of Zambia in order to qualify for designation as a World Heritage Site.
