= Olipa Phiri =

Zambian politician

Member of the National Assembly for Nyimba
- In office 11 August 2016 – 11 August 2021
- Preceded by: Forrie Tembo
- Succeeded by: Menyani Zulu

Minister of Comumunity Development and Social Welfare
- In office September 2018 – July 2019
- President: Edgar Lungu
- Preceded by: Emerine Kabanshi
- Succeeded by: Kampamba Mulenga

Minister in the Office of the Vice President
- In office July 2019 – August 2021

Personal details
- Born: November 10, 1967 (age 58)

Olipa Phiri (born 10 November 1967) is a Zambian politician. She was appointed as the Minister of Community Development and Social Welfare in September 2018. She was subsequently appointed a Minister in the Office of the Vice President of Zambia in July 2019. She served as the Member of Parliament in the National Assembly of Zambia for Nyimba from 2016 to 2021.
