= Great East Road =

Major road in Zambia

Great East Road (T4)

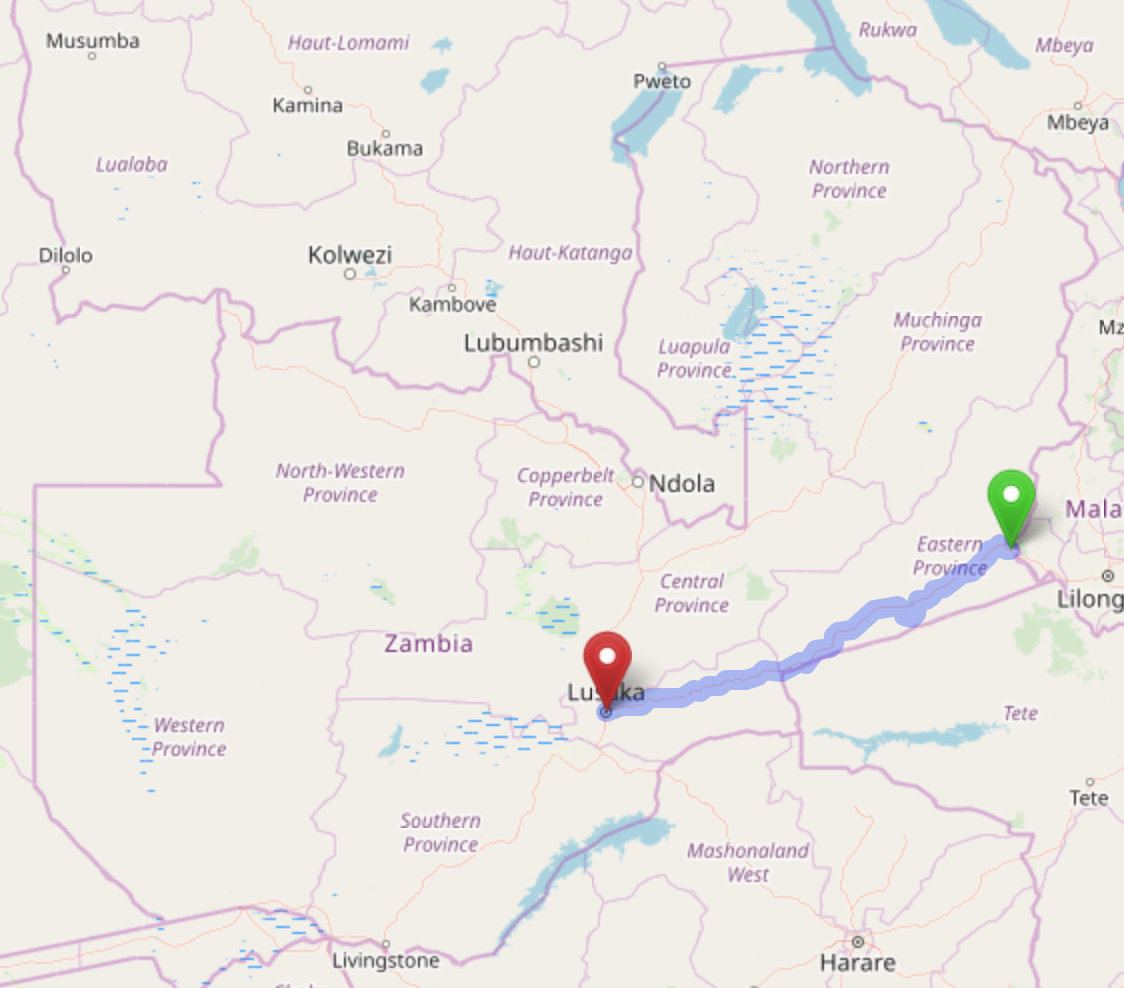
- Map showing the Great East Road through Zambia

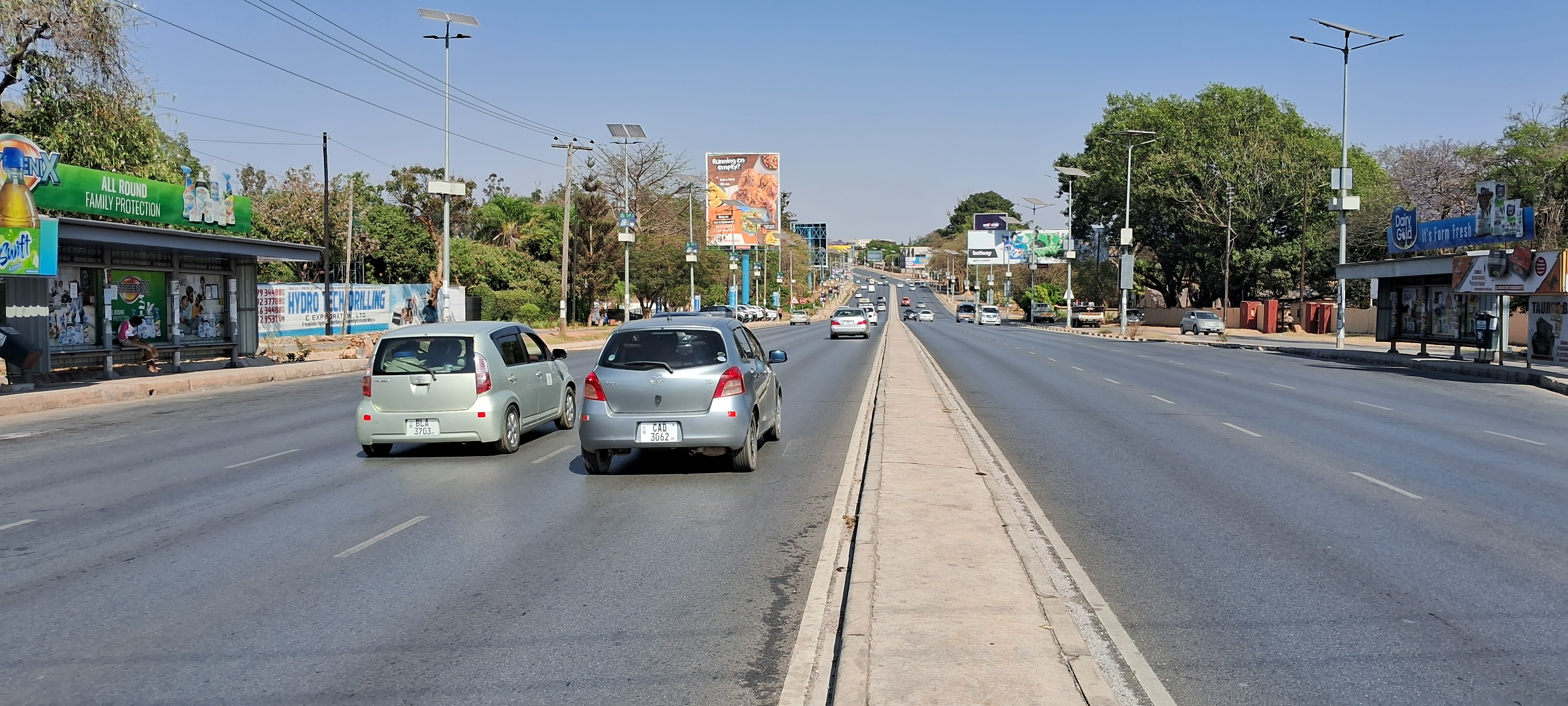

Route information
- Length: 595 km (370 mi)

Major junctions
- West end: T2 / M9 in Lusaka
- D145 at Luangwa Bridge; D142 in Nyimba; D138 in Petauke; T6 in Katete; D123 in Chipata; M12 in Chipata; D128 in Chipata
- East end: M12 at the Mwami Border with Malawi near Mchinji

Location
- Country: Zambia
- Provinces: Lusaka, Eastern
- Major cities: Lusaka, Chongwe, Rufunsa, Nyimba, Petauke, Sinda, Katete, Chipata

Highway system
- Transport in Zambia
← T3	→ T5

The Great East Road is a major road in Zambia and the main route linking its Eastern Province with the rest of the country. It is also the major link between Zambia and Malawi and between Zambia and northern Mozambique. However, the route does not carry as much traffic as many of the other regional arterial roads and between the main cities it serves, Lusaka and Chipata, it passes through rural and wilderness areas. In Lusaka the road forms the main arterial road for the eastern suburbs. The entire route from Lusaka to Chipata and the border with Malawi is designated the T4 road on Zambia's road network.

== History ==
Chipata, the capital of the Eastern Province, was an early outpost of the British colonial administration as Fort Jameson when Zambia was Northern Rhodesia. Like most of the Eastern Province, it had much easier access to Malawi, then the British protectorate of Nyasaland, and to the Mozambique ports of Quelimane and Beira than to the rest of Northern Rhodesia, and so most trade and communication in early colonial days was eastwards. Until the mid-1920s mail, goods and passengers went between the capital of the territory at Livingstone and Fort Jameson by train through neighbouring countries — via Bulawayo and Beira to Blantyre and then by road.

Before the Great East Road, the first direct vehicle access to the east of any kind was a track made in 1929 by transport companies following a more northerly route than the present road, and which crossed both the Lunsemfwa River and the Luangwa by pontoons made from dugout canoes roped together.

Eventually the Northern Rhodesian authorities needed a better road to assert their control over the Eastern Province, and the first Great East Road was built in 1932 from the Great North Road at the small railway town of Lusaka (Livingstone was still the capital, and this junction of the 'Great Roads' together with the main north–south railway contributed to the decision to site the capital in Lusaka in 1935).

== Route geography ==
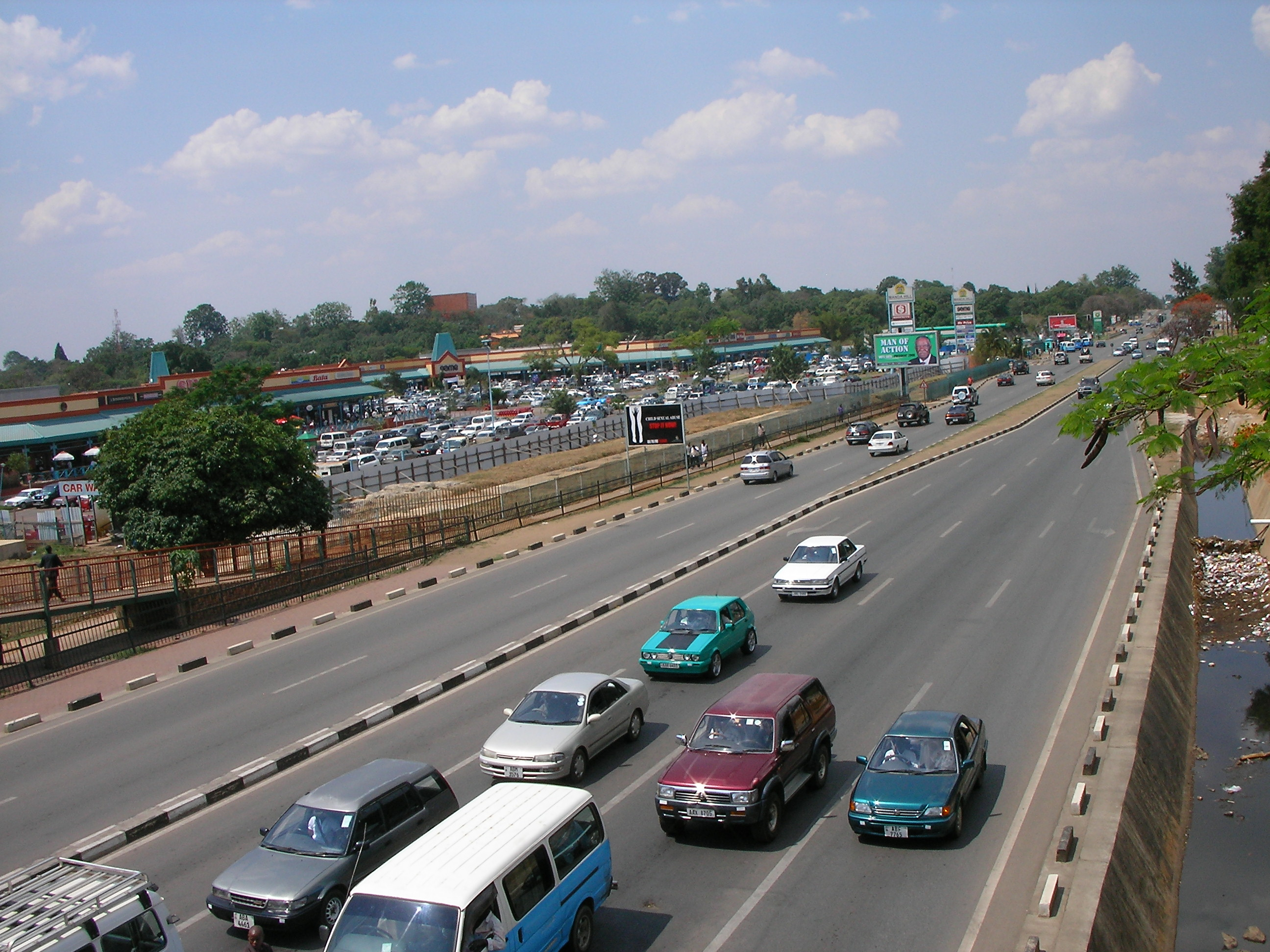
Great East Road in northeast Lusaka

Road traffic in Lusaka

The Eastern Province is a narrow slice of land sandwiched between Mozambique and Malawi to its south and east, and the Luangwa Valley, world-famous for its wildlife, to the north-west, which no highways cross. Apart from a bush track over the highlands in the far north of the province, a narrow neck of land in the west became the only way in from or out to the rest of Zambia, and as the only highway to cross it, the Great East road is strategically vulnerable. This neck is cut by the lower Luangwa River making a turn due south to the Zambezi, in a narrow and deep valley with steep slopes and thick vegetation, amounting in some sections to a gorge. The river is 250 to 400 m wide in this area, and flows quite fast, with a huge variation according to season.

== The route and its branches ==
Crossing the steep terrain of the lower Luangwa valley was a major challenge. The 1929 track was usually closed in the rainy season, and so the first Luangwa Bridge was built in 1932 with funding from the Beit Trust. On the eastern side, once the road had climbed up the difficult terrain onto the Luangwa-Zambezi watershed at Nyimba, Petauke, and Katete, the going is easier. Chipata is reached 570 km from Lusaka and the road goes on to the Malawian border 20 km further on, where it connects via Mchinji to the Malawian capital of Lilongwe, just 120 km from the border.

The Great East Road has 3 tollgates (one just east of Lusaka; one between Nyimba and Petauke; one just west of Chipata).

=== Route ===
The T4 begins north of Lusaka Central, at a roundabout junction with the T2 road (Great North Road; Cairo Road) and the M9 road. It begins by going eastwards as the Great East Road to form the main road of the central-eastern suburbs, passing the Manda Hill Mall, Arcades Mall and East Park Mall before passing by the University of Zambia main campus. Immediately after the Kenneth Kaunda International Airport turn-off in the Chelstone suburb (the last suburb of Lusaka), the T4 crosses into Chongwe District.

From the airport turn-off, the T4 heads eastwards for 30 kilometres, though the Chongwe Toll Plaza, to the town of Chongwe, where it passes through the town centre as the main road. From Chongwe, the T4 continues eastwards for 115 kilometres, crossing the Chongwe River, to the town of Rufunsa in the district of the same name. From Rufunsa, the T4 goes eastwards for 70 kilometres to meet the northern terminus of the D145, which goes southwards to the town of Luangwa (85 kilometres away). Immediately after the Luangwa turn-off, the T4 leaves Lusaka Province and crosses the Luangwa River into the Eastern Province as the Luangwa Bridge.

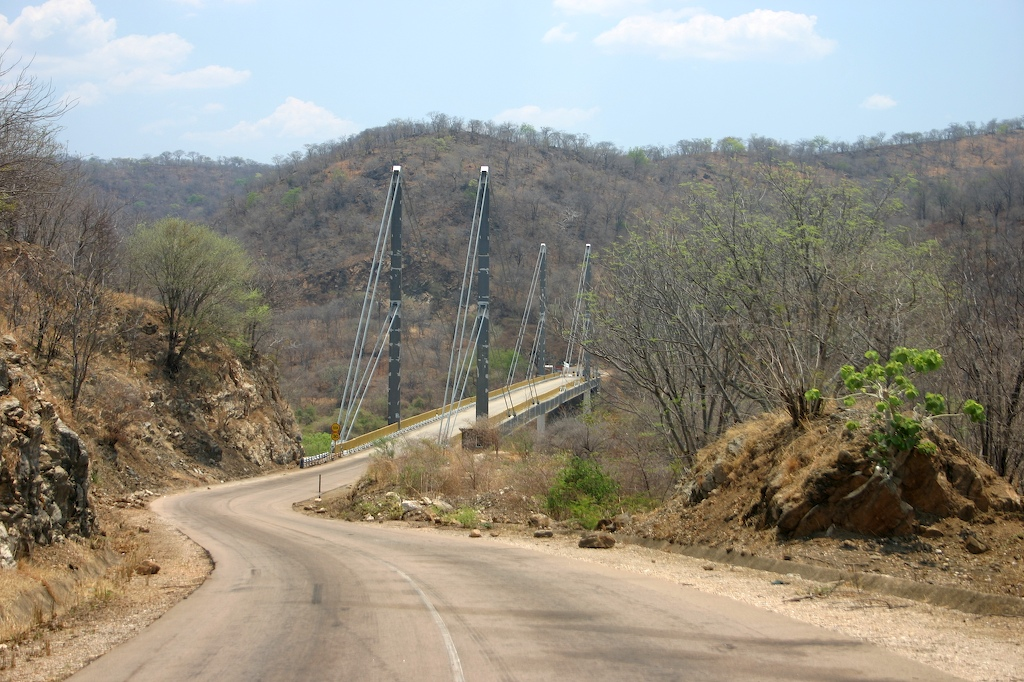
The Luangwa Bridge

From the Luangwa Bridge, the T4 heads east-north-east for 165 kilometres, following the near borderline with Mozambique, through the town of Nyimba, through the Alexander Grey Zulu Toll Plaza, to bypass Petauke to the south (where the D138 provides access to the town centre). From the Petauke turn-off, the T4 heads east-north-east for 87 kilometres, through the town of Sinda, to the town of Katete, where it meets the northern terminus of the T6 road, which goes southwards to the border with Mozambique. The T6 is the main route used by motorists to access Mozambique from Zambia.

From Katete, the T4 heads east-north-east for 80 kilometres, though the Reuben C Kamanga Toll Plaza, to enter the city of Chipata, where it meets the southern terminus of the M12 road (which goes north to Lundazi and the South Luangwa National Park) before passing through the city centre in a south-easterly direction. Immediately after the Chipata City Centre, the T4 meets the northern terminus of the D128, which goes southwards to Chadiza. The T4 continues east-south-east for 18 kilometres to reach the Mwami Border with Malawi, where it crosses the national boundary and becomes the M12 road of Malawi, which connects to the city of Lilongwe (Capital of Malawi; 120 kilometres away). The border settlement on the Malawian side is named Mchinji.

=== Branches ===
In addition to its east-west Lusaka-Malawi axis, the Great East Road links north to Lundazi (using the M12 road from Chipata), north-west to the South Luangwa National Park (using the D104 road from Chipata), south-east to Mozambique (using the T6 road from Katete), and, in Lusaka Province, south to the Lower Zambezi National Park and the town of Luangwa at the Luangwa-Zambezi river confluence (using the D145 road from the Luangwa Bridge). In the 1960s the Great East road was paved, opening up the Luangwa Valley (and to some extent, Lake Malawi) to tourism. At times the surface has deteriorated considerably. The section between Katete and the Luangwa Bridge was repaired and reconstructed around 2002/3.

== Strategic significance ==
As well as being strategically vulnerable as described above, the Great East Road is within a few kilometres of Mozambique and a few tens of kilometres of Zimbabwe, where there were wars of independence in the 1960s and 1970s. As a result of Zambia's political support for the anti-apartheid and independence sides in these conflicts, armed incursions cut the road at the Luangwa Bridge, with it being rebuilt and reopened in 1968. As of 2022, there are plans to rehabilitate the bridge.

== T6 Road ==
The T6 road is the road that links Zambia with Northern Mozambique. At the town of Katete, 80 kilometres west of Chipata, 490 kilometres east of Lusaka, at a junction with the T4 (Great East Road), begins the road going south-east towards the border with Mozambique. The T6 road is 55 km in length from Katete, passing through Chilembwe and Mlolo (through the western side of Chadiza District), to the Chanida Border with Mozambique. The long road ahead through Mozambique (the N9 route) provides access to the city of Tete. The border on the Mozambique side is named Cassacatiza.

== M12 Road ==
M12 Road

Route information
- Length: 180 km (110 mi)

Major junctions
- South end: T4 (Great East Road) in Chipata
- North end: D104/D103/D109 in Lundazi

Location
- Country: Zambia
- Provinces: Eastern
- Major cities: Chipata, Lundazi

Highway system
- Transport in Zambia
← M11	→ M13

The M12 road is the road that connects Chipata with Lundazi and Chama. Together with the Great East Road (T4) to Lusaka, it is the main route connecting Chama and Lundazi with the rest of the country. The M12 is a road in a poor condition as of 2022.

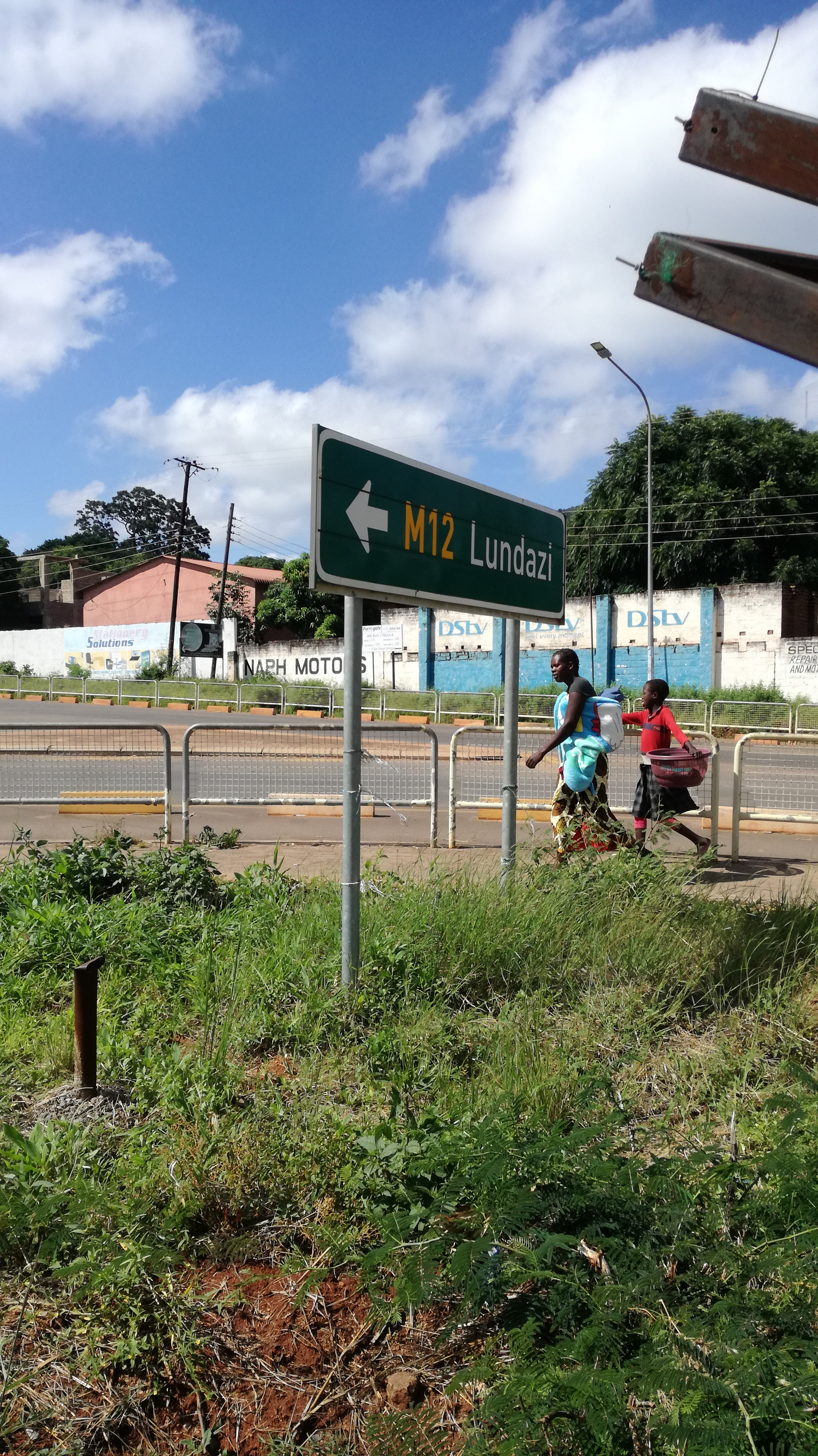
Traffic sign on the Great East Road at the junction with the M12 in Chipata

It starts at a junction with the T4 (Great East Road) just north-west of Chipata City Centre and goes northwards for 7 kilometres to reach a t-junction with the D104 (Chipata-Mfuwe Road), which goes north-west to the Chipata Airport (2 kilometres away) and extends further through Mambwe District to the tourist settlement of Mfuwe and its International Airport south of the South Luangwa National Park and the Luangwa River (100 kilometres away).

At this junction, the M12 makes a right turn and goes northwards for 173 kilometres, following the Malawi borderline, through the Chipangali and Lumezi Districts, to reach its northern terminus in the vicinity of the town of Lundazi, where it ends at another junction with the D104 road coming from the South Luangwa National Park and the Luambe National Park in the west. The road continuing northwards from this junction is the D103 road, which provides access to the town of Chama. The D109 connects eastwards from the D103 in Lundazi to the Lusuntha border with Malawi.

== Luangwa Road ==
The Luangwa Road (designated as D145 on Zambia's road network) is the road that provides access to the town of Luangwa. It is the only road used to enter and exit Luangwa.

It starts at a junction with the T4 (Great East Road) just west of the Luangwa Bridge in Rufunsa District, going southwards. It heads for 85 kilometres, crossing into Luangwa District and following the Luangwa River (which forms Zambia's boundary with Mozambique in this area), to reach the town of Luangwa adjacent to the Luangwa River and Zambezi River confluence, where it ends in the town centre.

== See also ==
- Transport in Zambia
- Roads in Zambia
