= Nyimba North =

National Assembly constituency in Zambia

Nyimba North is a constituency of the National Assembly of Zambia. It was created in 2026 when Nyimba constituency was split into two constituencies (Nyimba North and Nyimba South). It covers the northern part of Nyimba District.

== List of MPs ==
Election year	MP	Party
2026	Paul Lungu	National Reconciliation Party for Unity and Prosperity
