= Menyani Zulu =

Zambian-politician

Honorable Menyani Zulu

Member of Parliament of the National Assembly
- Incumbent
- Assumed office 2021
- Preceded by: Olipa Phiri
- Constituency: Nyimba

Personal details
- Born: September 21, 1973 (age 52) Zambia
- Party: Independent

Menyani Zulu (born 21 September 1973) is a Zambian politician who serves as Member of Parliament for Nyimba in the National Assembly of Zambia. He was elected member of parliament in August 2021.

== Career ==
Prior to his election to the National Assembly, Zulu served as Chairman of Elections for the National Democratic Congress. He then contested the Parliament seat for Nyimba in 2021 and won.

== Personal life ==
Zulu lives in Ndola and is married.
