= Chirundu (constituency) =

Constituency of the National Assembly of Zambia

Chirundu is a constituency of the National Assembly of Zambia, created in 2016. It covers the towns of Chirundu and Lusitu in Chirundu District of Southern Province.

== List of MPs ==
Election year	MP	Party
2016	Douglas Syakalima	United Party for National Development
2021	Douglas Syakalima	United Party for National Development
2026	James Mwanja	Independent
