= Siavonga (constituency) =

Constituency of the National Assembly of Zambia

Siavonga is a constituency of the National Assembly of Zambia. It covers Siavonga and surrounding areas in Siavonga District of Southern Province.

== List of MPs ==
Election year	MP	Party
Siavonga
1973	Cyrus Moonga	United National Independence Party
1978	Fredrick Hapunda	United National Independence Party
1983	Fredrick Hapunda	United National Independence Party
1988	Fredrick Hapunda	United National Independence Party
1991	Fredrick Hapunda	Movement for Multi-Party Democracy
1996	Fredrick Hapunda	Movement for Multi-Party Democracy
2001	Douglas Syakalima	United Party for National Development
2006	Douglas Syakalima	United Party for National Development
2011	Kennedy Hamudulu	United Party for National Development
2016	Darius Mulunda	United Party for National Development
2021	Darius Mulunda	United Party for National Development
2026	Darius Mulunda	United Party for National Development
