= Moses Mawere =

Zambian forester and former minister of youth, sport and child development

Minister of Sport, Youth and Child Development
- In office 27 September 2016 – 19 July 2019
- Preceded by: Vincent Mwale
- Succeeded by: Emmanuel Mulenga

Member of the National Assembly for Chipata Central
- In office August 2016 – August 2021
- Preceded by: Reuben Mtolo Phiri
- Succeeded by: Reuben Mtolo Phiri

Personal details
- Born: 14 March 1980 (age 46) Zambia
- Party: Patriotic Front
- Education: BA Development Studies; Diploma in Forestry
- Profession: Forester · Politician

Moses Mawere (born 14 March 1980) is a Zambian forester and politician who represented Chipata Central in the National Assembly of Zambia from 2016 to 2021. He served as Minister of Sport, Youth and Child Development from September 2016 until his removal in July 2019.

== Early life and education ==
Mawere trained in forestry, obtaining a Diploma in Forestry and later a BA in Development Studies. He worked professionally as a forester before entering politics.

== Political career ==
He stood as the Patriotic Front candidate in Chipata Central at the 2016 general election and was elected. He was then appointed as Minister of Sport, Youth and Child Development on 27 September 2016.

As minister, he introduced physical education as a compulsory subject in schools and criticized the abandonment of youth resource centre projects.

In July 2019, he was dismissed as minister (replaced by Emmanuel Mulenga). He went on to serve on the Committee on Agriculture, Lands and Natural Resources as a backbench MP. He did not take part in the 2021 general election.

In November 2025, Mawere formed a new political party named the Exodus Party for Peace and Prosperity (EPPP). On 14 May 2026, he stepped down from contesting for presidency at the 2026 general election in order to support Harry Kalaba of the Citizens First party. On 19 May 2026, Kalaba announced that Mawere will be his running mate (vice president) at the 2026 general election to happen in August that year.

In July 2026, Mawere decided to endorse Brian Mundubile of the Tonse Alliance for president at the 2026 general election to happen the following month and joined his campaign team. Despite this, he remained the running mate of Harry Kalaba due to laws preventing him from resigning.
