= Nyimba South =

National Assembly constituency in Zambia

Nyimba South is a constituency of the National Assembly of Zambia. It was created in 2026 when Nyimba constituency was split into two constituencies (Nyimba North and Nyimba South). It covers the southern part of Nyimba District, including the town of Nyimba.

== List of MPs ==
Election year	MP	Party
2026	Mackson Kapantha	National Reconciliation Party for Unity and Prosperity
