= Besnat Jere =

Zambian politician

Besnat Hellen Mayase Jere

Member of the National Assembly for Luangeni
- In office 2002–2006
- Preceded by: Solomon Mbuzi
- Succeeded by: Angela Cifire

Personal details
- Born: 4 May 1952 (age 72)
- Died: 7 June 2020
- Political party: United National Independence Party
- Profession: Farmer and Politician

Besnat Hellen Mayase Jere (4 May 1952 - 7 June 2020) was a Zambian politician. She served as Member of the National Assembly for Luangeni from 2002 until 2006.

She was a princess and member of the Ngoni Royal Establishment as she was the granddaughter of HRH Nkosi (King) Nzamane II. Nkosi Nzamane II was the younger brother of HRH Paramount Kings of Kings Mpezeni II of the Ngoni people of Eastern Province.

== Biography ==
Prior to entering politics, Jere was a farmer. She was previously Postmaster General (Head) of Posts and Telecommunications Corporation (PTC) in Chipata. She was the United National Independence Party (UNIP) candidate in Luangeni in the 2001 general elections and was elected to the National Assembly with a 2,027-vote majority. During her first term in parliament she was a member of the Pan-African Parliament.

In the 2006 general elections UNIP joined the United Democratic Alliance, with Jere nominated as the alliance's candidate in Luangeni. However, she finished third behind Angela Cifire of the Movement for Multi-Party Democracy and Charles Zulu of the Patriotic Front.
