= Darius Mulunda =

Zambian politician (born 1969)

Honorable Darius Mulunda

Elected member of the National Assembly of Zambia
- Incumbent
- Assumed office 2016
- Preceded by: Kennedy Hamudulu
- Constituency: Siavonga

Personal details
- Born: Darius Mulunda; January 7, 1969 (age 57) Zambia
- Party: United Party for National Development

Darius Mulunda (born January 7, 1969) is a Zambian politician who has represented Siavonga Constituency in the National Assembly since 2016 as a member of the United Party for National Development (UPND).

== Political career ==
Mulunda was first elected as Member of Parliament for Siavonga Constituency in the 2016 general election under the United Party for National Development (UPND).

He retained the seat in the 2021 general election, securing a second term. Mulunda was elected for a third consecutive term in the 2026 general election, continuing to represent Siavonga for the UPND.
