= Nyimba (constituency) =

Zambian constituency

Nyimba was a constituency of the National Assembly of Zambia. It covered Chitizauwe, Chiwowa, Kacholola, Mayawa and Nyimba in Nyimba District of Eastern Province.

== List of MPs ==
Election year	MP	Party
1973	Sylvester Tembo	United National Independence Party
1978	Aston Phiri	United National Independence Party
1983	Zilole Mumba	United National Independence Party
1988	Ronald Koloweka	United National Independence Party
1991	Daalick Mapon	United National Independence Party
1996	Chembe Nyangu	Movement for Multi-Party Democracy
2001	Roy Gray	Forum for Democracy and Development
2006	Forrie Tembo	Movement for Multi-Party Democracy
2011	Forrie Tembo	Movement for Multi-Party Democracy
2016	Olipa Phiri	Patriotic Front
2021	Menyani Zulu	Independent
Seat abolished (split into Nyimba North and Nyimba South)
