= Luangeni =

Constituency of the National Assembly of Zambia

Luangeni is a constituency of the National Assembly of Zambia. It covers the southern part of Chipata District in Eastern Province.

== List of MPs ==
Election year	MP	Party
1973	Shart Banda	United National Independence Party
1978	Shart Banda	United National Independence Party
1983	William Kayamba	United National Independence Party
1988	Johnstone Jere	United National Independence Party
1991	Johnstone Jere	United National Independence Party
1996	Solomon Mbuzi	Movement for Multi-Party Democracy
2001	Besnat Jere	United National Independence Party
2006	Angela Cifire	Movement for Multi-Party Democracy
2011	Charles Zulu	Independent
2016	Charles Zulu	Patriotic Front
2021	Moses Moyo	Independent
2026	Moses Moyo	United Party for National Development
