= Petauke District =

Coordinates: 14°10′S 31°00′E

- District
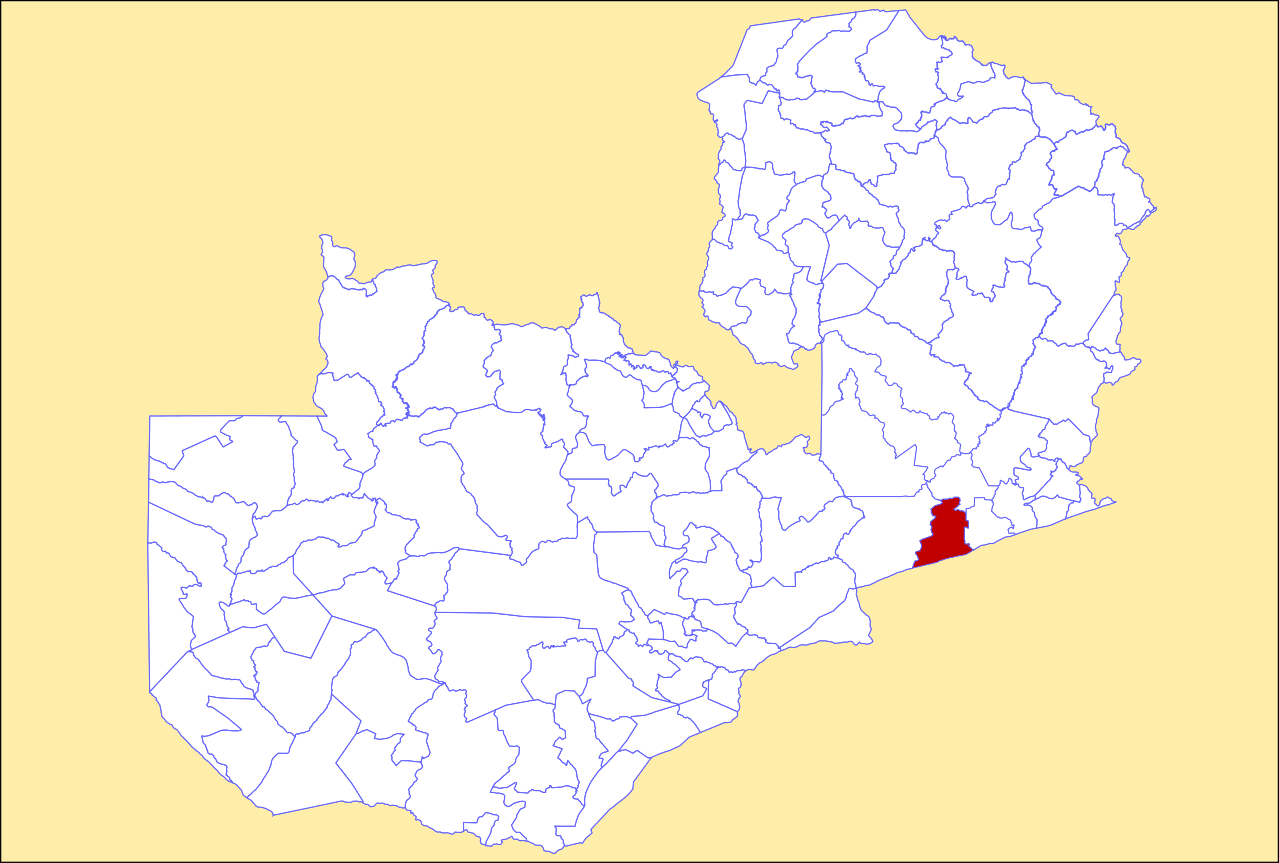
- Interactive map of Petauke District
- Country: Zambia
- Province: Eastern Province
- Capital: Petauke

Area
  - Total: 2,695.9 km^{2} (1,040.9 sq mi)

Population (2022)
  - Total: 259,385
  - Density: 96.215/km^{2} (249.19/sq mi)
- Time zone: UTC+2 (CAT)

Petauke District is a district of Zambia, located in Eastern Province. The capital lies at Petauke. As of the 2022 Zambian Census, the district had a population of 259,385 people. It consists of two constituencies, namely Petauke Central and Kaumbwe.

== Notable people ==
- Diana Chikotesha, FIFA football assistant referee, born in the village of Nanile in Petauke District

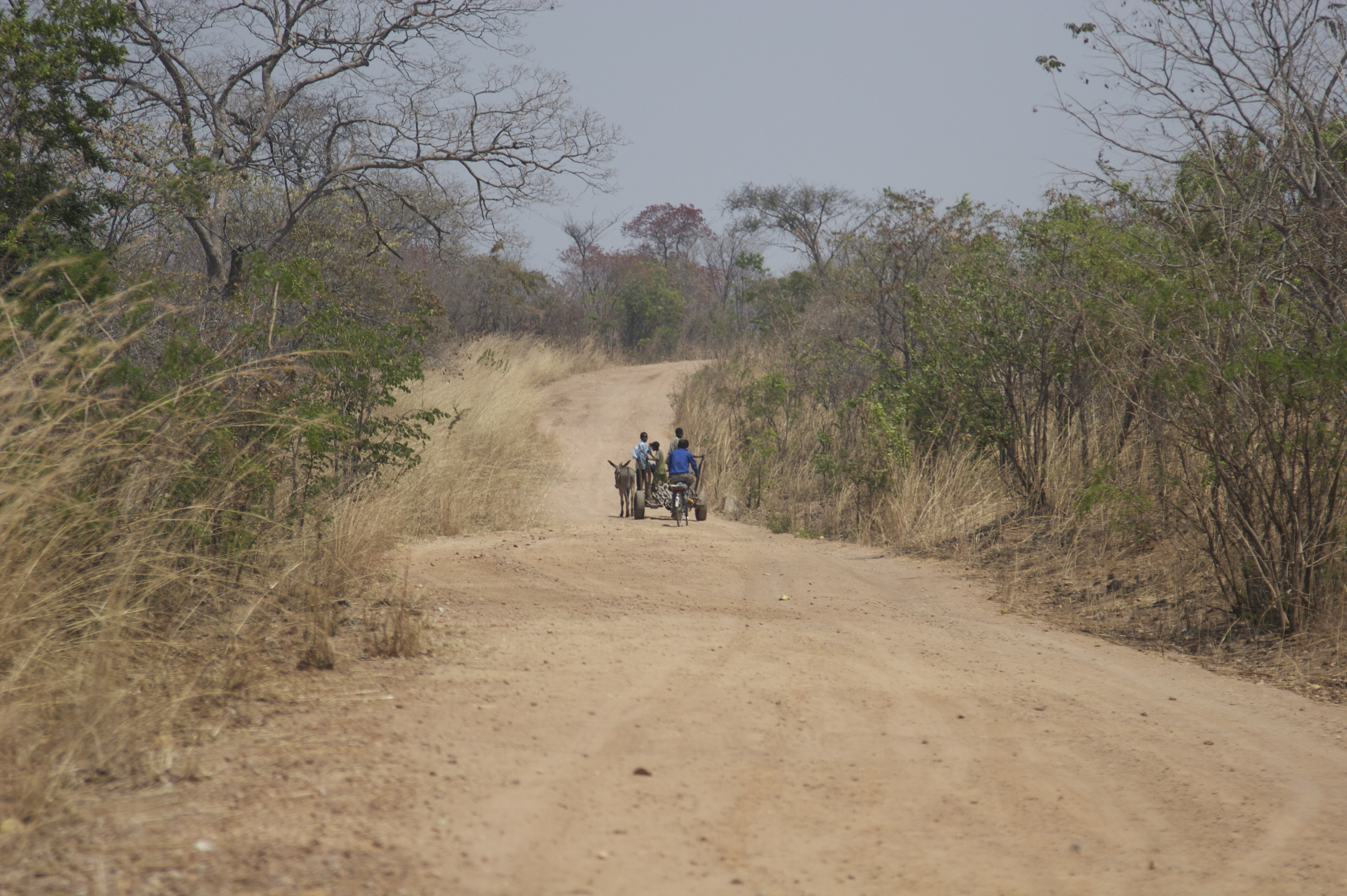
Petauke District, Zambia
