= Moses Moyo =

Zambian politician (born 1976)

Moses F Moyo (born 16 August 1976) is a Zambian politician. He is the current Member of Parliament for Luangeni and the current Minister of Agriculture. He was the 2nd Deputy Speaker in the National Assembly of Zambia from 3 September 2021 to 15 May 2026.
