= Gibson Chigaga =

Zambian lawyer and politician

Gibson Gerald Chigaga (died 1991) was a Zambian lawyer and politician.

Chigaga was appointed Minister of Finance of Zambia in 1987, after Zambia had broken relations with the International Monetary Fund (IMF), which had attempted to force structural adjustment on the country. He oversaw Zambia's economy as it "grew from its own resources" and helped organise a return to the IMF after the 1988 general election. He died suddenly in March 1991.
