= Katete District =

Coordinates: 14°05′S 32°00′E

- District
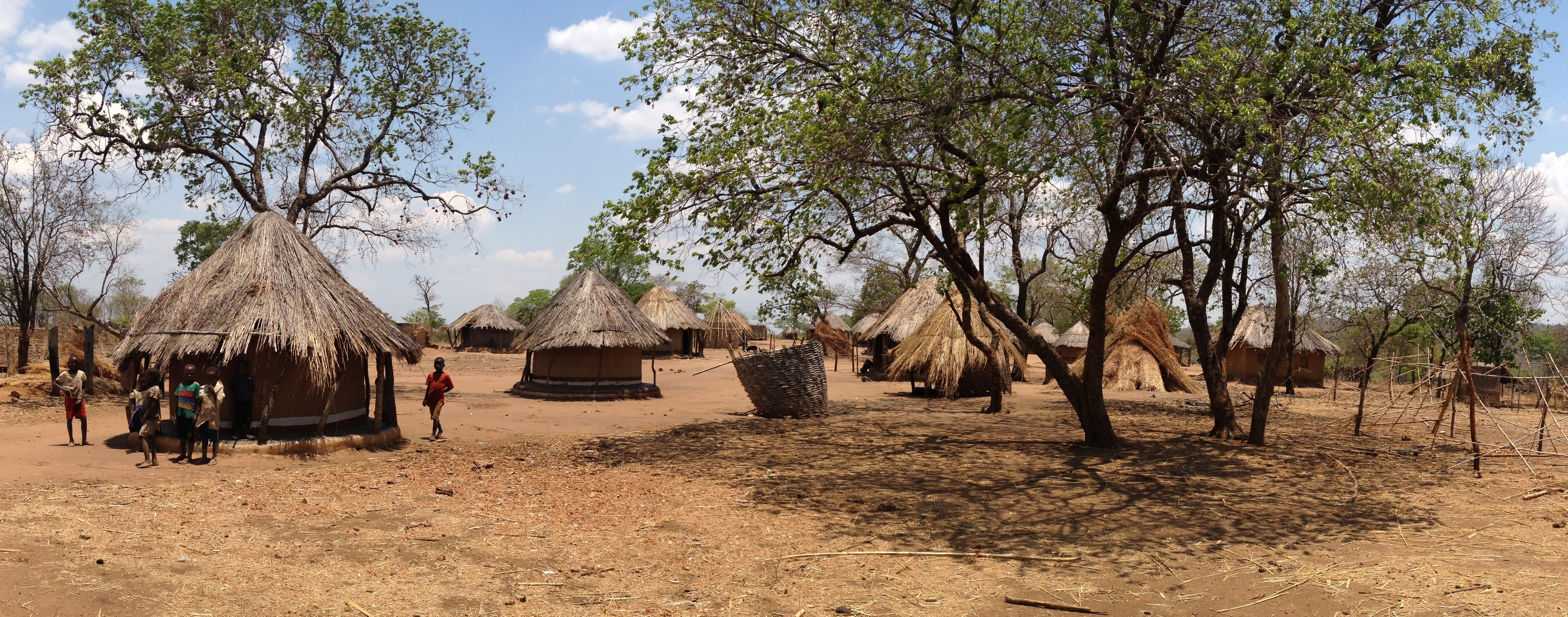
- Kazika village in Katete District

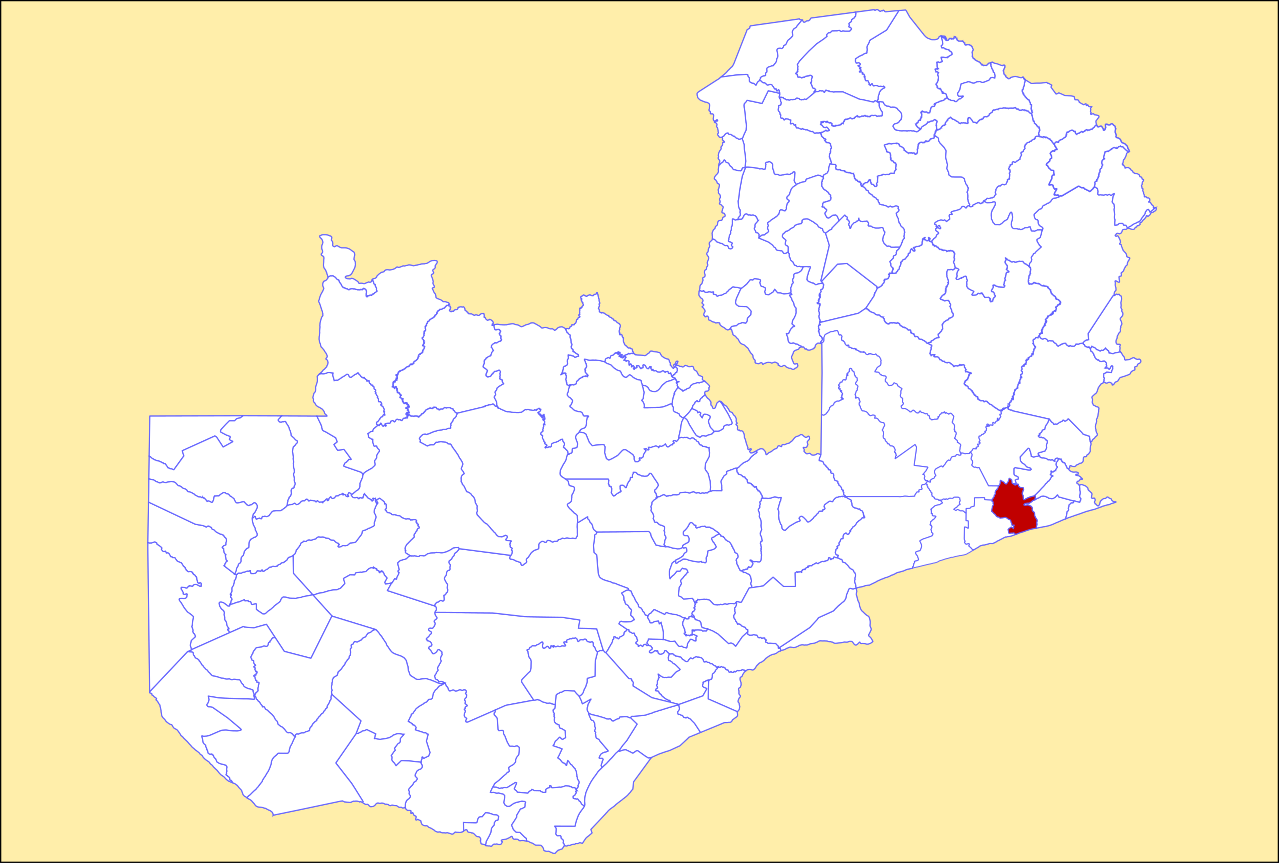
- District location in Zambia
- Country: Zambia
- Province: Eastern Province
- Capital: Katete

Area
  - Total: 2,455.8 km^{2} (948.2 sq mi)

Population (2022)
  - Total: 214,072
  - Density: 87.170/km^{2} (225.77/sq mi)
- Time zone: UTC+2 (CAT)

Katete District with headquarters at Katete in Eastern Province, Zambia, includes woodland in the north sloping down into the Luangwa Valley, good farmland amid rocky hills in the centre, and deforested plateau exposed to soil erosion and degradation in the south along the border with Mozambique. As of the 2022 Zambian Census, the district had a population of 214,072 people. It consists of two constituencies, namely Mkaika and Milanzi.
