= Petauke =

- Town
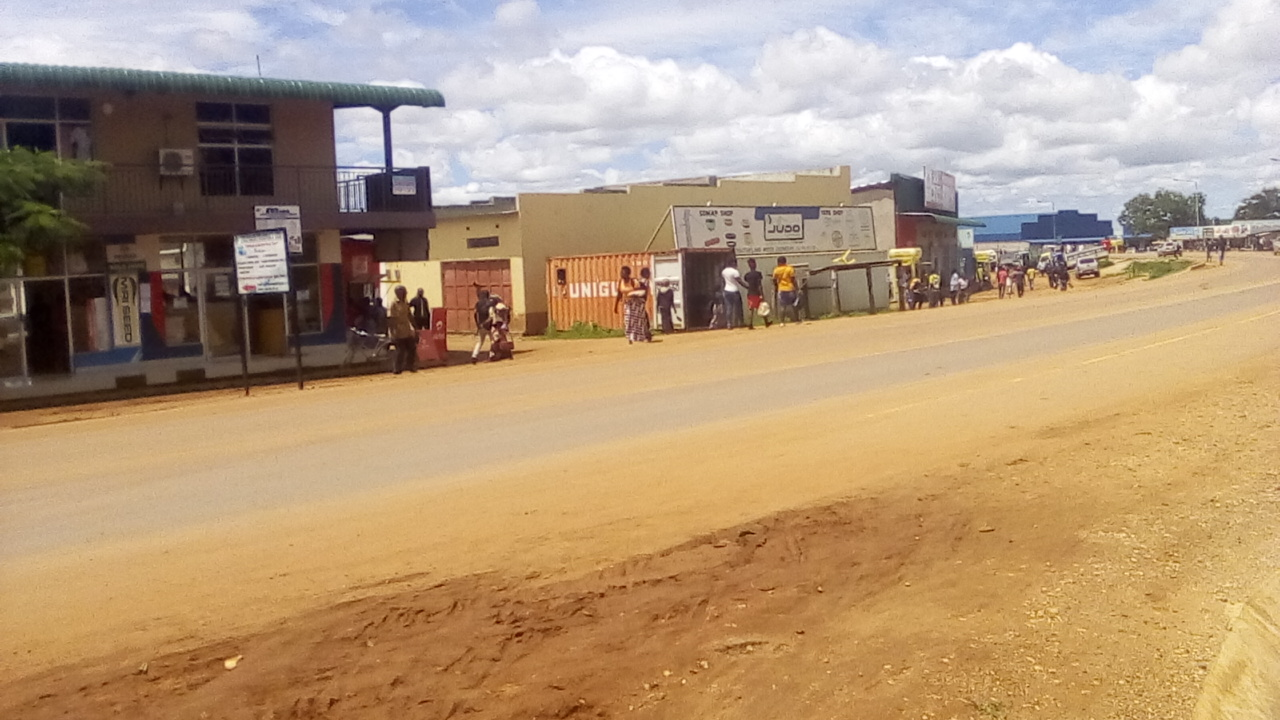

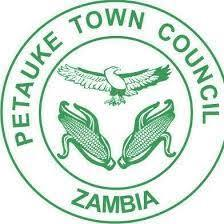
- Seal

- Location within Zambia
- Coordinates: 14°15′S 31°20′E
- Country: Zambia
- Province: Eastern Province
- District: Petauke District
- Time zone: UTC+2 (CAT)
- Climate: Cwa

Petauke is a town and seat of Petauke District located in the Eastern Province of Zambia.

Petauke is 400 km east of Lusaka, the capital city of Zambia, just off the Great East Road. The main spoken language of the 14,000 residents is Nsenga.

Most telecommunication is by two local radio stations; Radio PASME, 91.3 and Radio Explorers, 88.1fm, which cover up to 120 km; mainly used by local businessmen, political leaders and traditional chiefs to disseminate their information.

The town is situated in an agricultural area; farmers produce maize, cotton, sunflower, groundnut, soya beans and many other crops. Industries include two cotton ginneries, one roofing industry, a number of small scale maize millers and cooking-oil refiners, three breweries, and small scale saw-mills. Government is putting up a milling plant for prisons.

The region around Petauke contains copper, amethyst, and gold. However, the minerals in the region are low grade and no serious mining investment has been made in the region. In the early 17th century, gold was mined and that contributed to high rate of slave trade. Mostly, the Swahili speaking peoples invaded the area.

== Transport ==
=== Rail ===
In 2015, it was proposed for a railway to be built from Chipata on the border with Malawi, through Petauke, to Serenje, a town on the TAZARA Railway line.

=== Road ===
The Great East Road (T4) passes to the south of Petauke, connecting to Lusaka in the west (400 kilometres away) and to Katete and Chipata in the east (170 kilometres away).

== Climate ==
Climate data for Petauke
Month	Jan	Feb	Mar	Apr	May	Jun	Jul	Aug	Sep	Oct	Nov	Dec	Year
Record high °C (°F)	32.2 (90.0)	32.7 (90.9)	31.6 (88.9)	31.2 (88.2)	30.3 (86.5)	28.4 (83.1)	28.6 (83.5)	32.5 (90.5)	37.0 (98.6)	35.7 (96.3)	39.0 (102.2)	33.5 (92.3)	39.0 (102.2)
Mean daily maximum °C (°F)	26.9 (80.4)	27.1 (80.8)	27.1 (80.8)	26.8 (80.2)	25.6 (78.1)	23.4 (74.1)	23.3 (73.9)	25.1 (77.2)	28.0 (82.4)	29.9 (85.8)	28.8 (83.8)	27.1 (80.8)	26.6 (79.9)
Mean daily minimum °C (°F)	17.3 (63.1)	17.5 (63.5)	17.9 (64.2)	17.5 (63.5)	14.4 (57.9)	10.9 (51.6)	10.9 (51.6)	12.8 (55.0)	15.8 (60.4)	17.4 (63.3)	17.6 (63.7)	17.4 (63.3)	15.6 (60.1)
Record low °C (°F)	13.9 (57.0)	13.2 (55.8)	13.9 (57.0)	11.2 (52.2)	5.9 (42.6)	3.6 (38.5)	2.5 (36.5)	4.6 (40.3)	7.3 (45.1)	10.8 (51.4)	11.4 (52.5)	12.4 (54.3)	2.5 (36.5)
Average precipitation mm (inches)	247.0 (9.72)	228.6 (9.00)	140.6 (5.54)	30.5 (1.20)	8.3 (0.33)	0.4 (0.02)	0.3 (0.01)	0.1 (0.00)	0.5 (0.02)	16.0 (0.63)	86.8 (3.42)	207.7 (8.18)	966.9 (38.07)
Average precipitation days (≥ 1.0 mm)	21	17	13	5	1	0	0	0	0	2	10	18	87
Source: NOAA (temperature 1961–1984, precipitation 1961–1991)

== See also ==
- Petauke District
