= Chipata District =

Coordinates: 13°30′S 32°10′E

- District
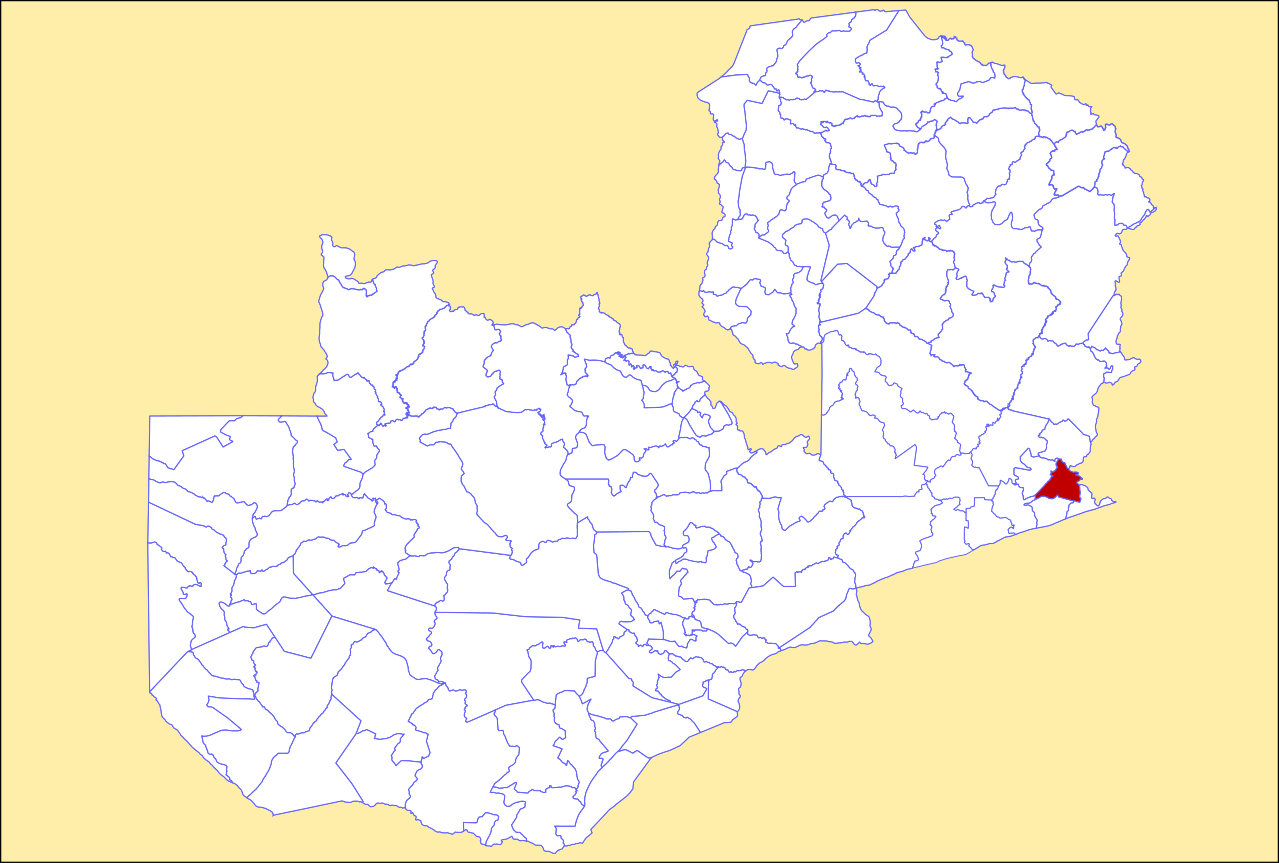
- District location in Zambia
- Country: Zambia
- Province: Eastern Province
- Capital: Chipata

Area
  - Total: 1,691.1 km^{2} (652.9 sq mi)
- Elevation: 1,181 m (3,875 ft)

Population (2022)
  - Total: 327,059
  - Density: 193.40/km^{2} (500.90/sq mi)
- Time zone: UTC+2 (CAT)

Chipata District is a district of Zambia, located in Eastern Province. The capital lies in Chipata. As of the 2022 Zambian Census, the district had a population of 327,059 people.

Chipata city centre is located about 570 km from Lusaka, the capital of Zambia, on the Great East Road, while it is only 130 km from Lilongwe, the capital of Malawi. Thus, Chipata accesses its imports mainly from Nacala and Dar es Salaam ports in Mozambique and Tanzania respectively, all routes passing through Malawi to Mwami Border. The District has been a trade centre since the colonial era of the current Zambia, when it was called Fort Jameson and was the capital of North-Eastern Rhodesia up to 1911. This cornerstone has left the town as the hub of Eastern Province, by maintaining its position as a Provincial Headquarters. Chipata was declared a city on 24 February 2017 (no longer a town).

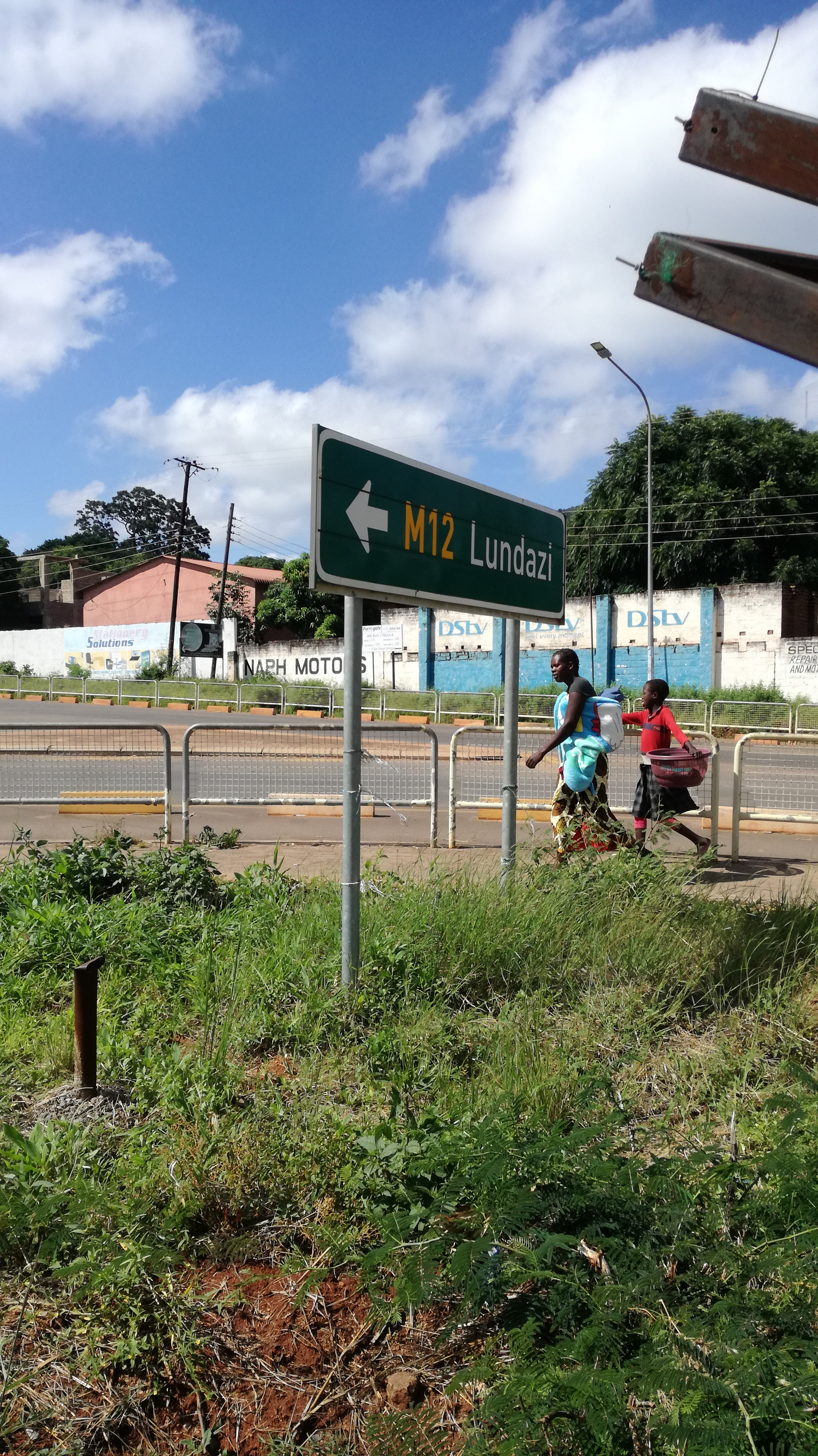
Traffic sign on Great East Road in Chipata

== Constituencies ==
Chipata District has two constituencies, namely Chipata Central and Luangeni.
