= Luangwa Bridge =

Bridge in Zambia

Coordinates: 14°58′33.6″S 30°12′45″E

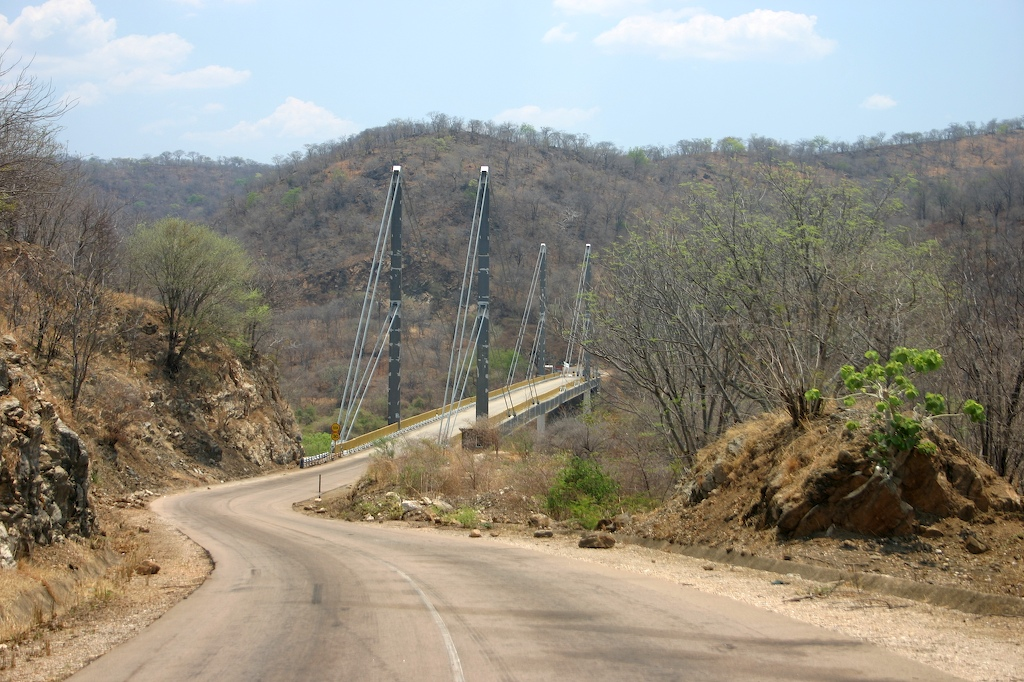
The Luangwa Bridge

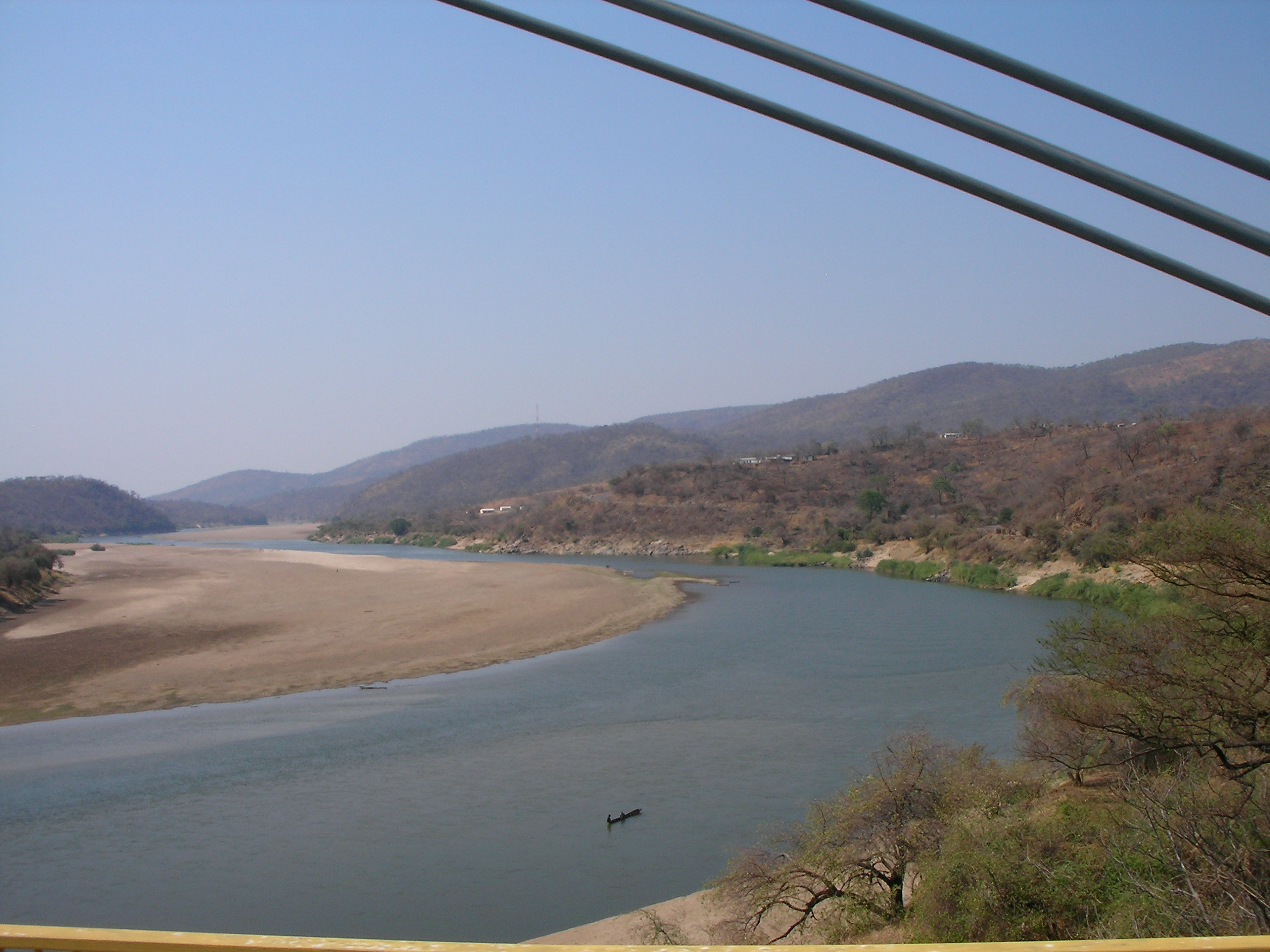
view from the bridge in mid-October

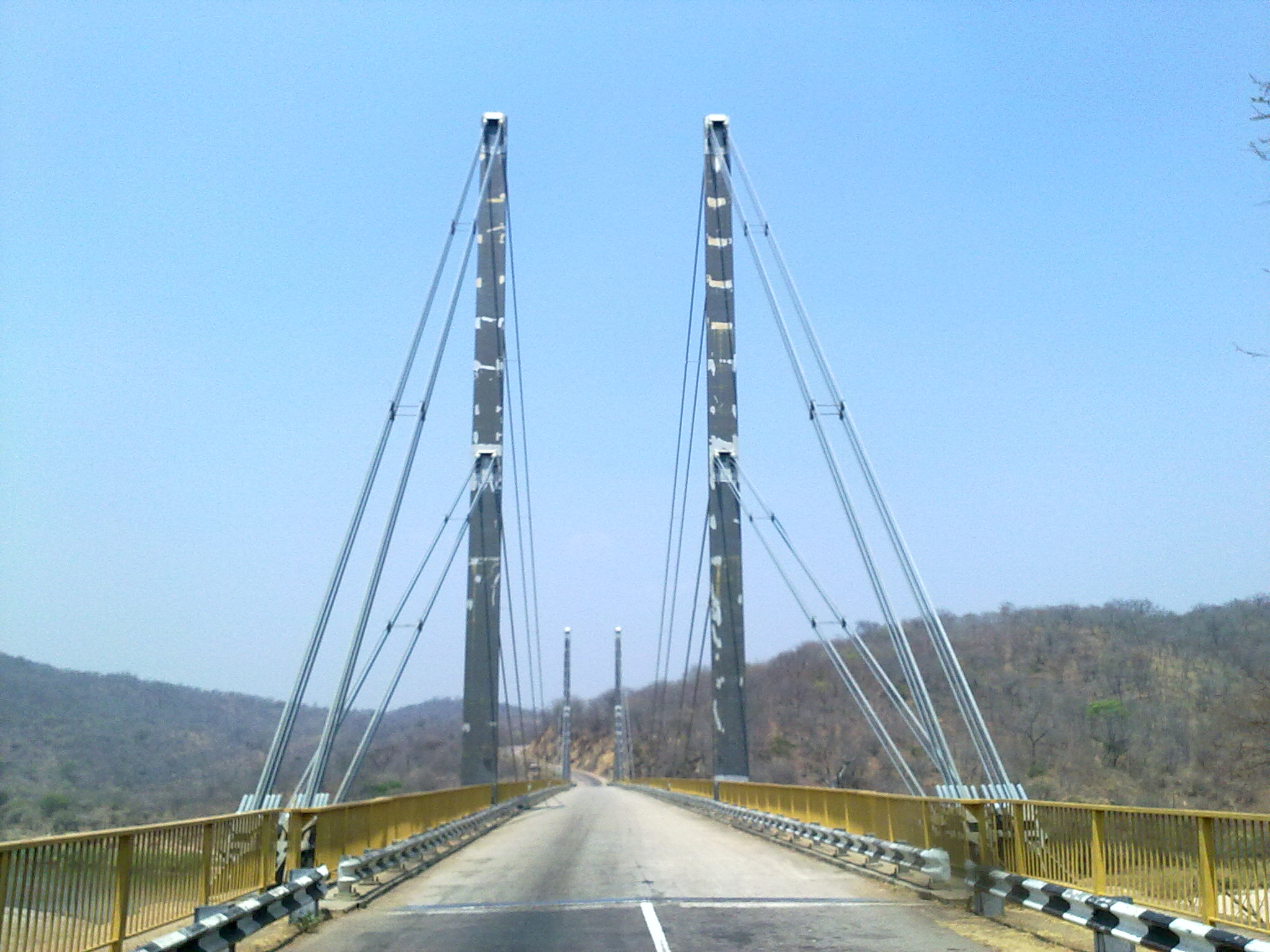
View across the bridge

The Luangwa Bridge is the only large bridge and the principal engineering challenge on Zambia's Great East Road, crossing the lower Luangwa River where it flows from the Luangwa Rift Valley into the Zambezi valley.

The river is 250–400 m wide in this area, and though in the dry season it may be confined to a shallow channel meandering across sandbanks, at the end of the rainy season any bridge has to be able to withstand a full-width, deep and fast-moving flood. The Great East Road runs for most of its length on watersheds at an elevation of around 1000 m, but the river is at an elevation of 390 m at the bottom of the valley. The bridge approaches have to contend with steep rugged slopes and deep ravines covered in forest or thick bush; the area is remote and about 250 km from the nearest city, Lusaka.

The First Luangwa Bridge was built in Zambia's colonial era in 1932 as a narrow 300 m long wide steel and reinforced concrete deck on concrete piers and columns, financed, like the Chirundu Bridge and Beit Bridge by the Beit Trust. Its proximity to Mozambique (about 2 km) and Rhodesia (60 km), as well as its status as the only access point within the country for Zambia's Eastern Province, makes it strategically vulnerable in any conflict. After Zambia's independence in 1964, President Kenneth Kaunda's support for freedom fighters in neighbouring countries led to the bridge being destroyed in revenge.

The Second Luangwa Bridge (opened in 1968) was built quickly above the first, with aid from Britain which had been the colonial power in Zambia. It is a cable-stayed bridge designed by Freeman Fox & Partners and built by the Redpath Dorman Long. It has a composite steel-reinforced concrete deck 9.8 m wide, two H-shaped steel pylons 42 m tall on two reinforced concrete piers, and steel cables. The main span is 222 m with approach spans of 40 m each.

In 1979 the military of Zimbabwe-Rhodesia destroyed the bridge as well as the Chambeshi road and rail bridges in order to stop the planned invasion of their country by the Zimbabwe People's Revolutionary Army (ZIPRA).

After another two decades of use, the bridge was rehabilitated under a project of the National Road Fund Agency funded by Danish aid.

The structure stands at 390 meters above sea level.

As of 2022, there are plans to rehabilitate the bridge.
