= Milanzi =

Constituency of the National Assembly of Zambia

Milanzi is a constituency of the National Assembly of Zambia. It covers Chilembwe in Katete District of Eastern Province.

== List of MPs ==
Election year	MP	Party
Katete South
1968	Amock Phiri	United National Independence Party
Seat abolished (merged into Katete)
1983	Joseph Mbewe	United National Independence Party
1988	Joseph Mbewe	United National Independence Party
Milanzi
1991	Joseph Mbewe	United National Independence Party
1996	Trywell Phiri	Movement for Multi-Party Democracy
2001	Rosemary Banda	United National Independence Party
2006	Chosani Njobvu	United Democratic Alliance
2008 (by-election)	Reuben Banda	Movement for Multi-Party Democracy
2010 (by-election)	Whiteson Banda	Movement for Multi-Party Democracy
2011	Whiteson Banda	Movement for Multi-Party Democracy
2016	Whiteson Banda	Patriotic Front
2021	Melesiana Phiri	Patriotic Front
2026	Lumankio Zulu	Independent
