= Chipata Airport =

Airport in Zambia

- IATA: CIP; ICAO: FLCP

Summary
- Airport type: Military/Civilian
- Serves: Chipata, Zambia
- Elevation AMSL: 3,359 ft / 1,024 m
- Coordinates: 13°33′25″S 32°35′13″E

Map
- Location of the airport in Zambia

Runways
Direction	Length		Surface
Direction	m	ft	Surface
17/35	1,470	4,823	Asphalt
- Source: GCM Google Maps SkyVector

Chipata Airport (IATA: CIP, ICAO: FLCP) is an airport serving Chipata, a city in the Eastern Province of Zambia.

The Chipata non-directional beacon (Ident: CP) is located on the field.

== Location ==
Chipata Airport is in eastern Zambia, near the town of Chipata, approximately 500 kilometres (310 mi), by air, northeast of Lusaka International Airport, the country's largest civilian and military airport.

This location is approximately 15 kilometres (9.3 mi) by road, northwest of the central business district of the town of Chipata.

== See also ==
- Transport in Zambia
- List of airports in Zambia
