= Katete =

Town in Eastern Province, Zambia

- Town
- Location in Zambia
- Coordinates: 14°3′30″S 32°02′38″E
- Country: Zambia
- Province: Eastern Province
- District: Katete District
- Time zone: UTC+2 (CAT)

Zambians in a typical Katete setting.

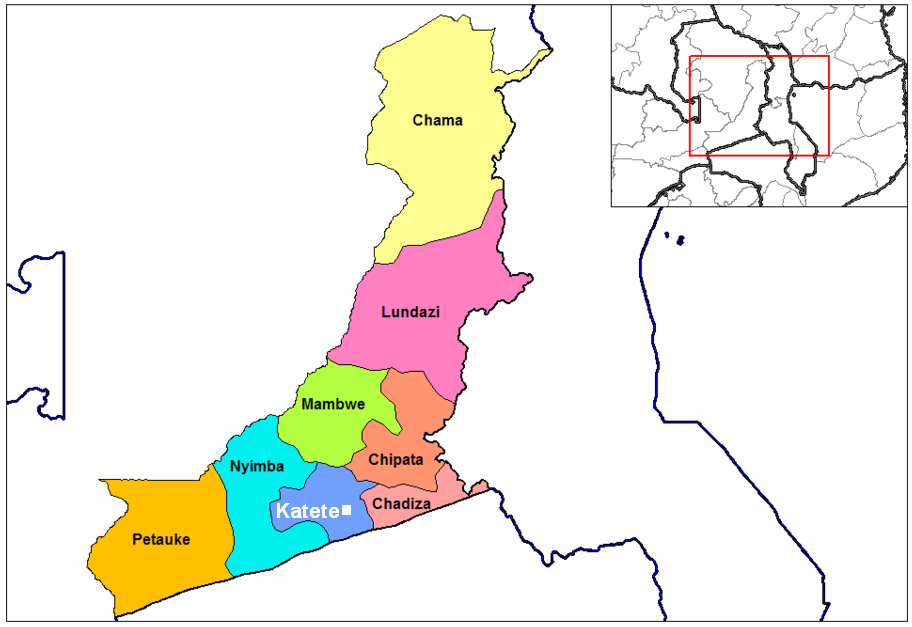
Location of Katete town and district in Eastern Province, Zambia

Katete is a medium-sized town in the Eastern Province of Zambia, and is headquarters of Katete District. The town is at the foot of rocky hills which lie to its east, including Mpangwe Hill and Kangarema Hill, which rise to 1600 m. The hills are surrounded by cultivated fields. Katete lies on the Great East Road about 90 km south-west of the provincial capital, Chipata, at an elevation of 1060 m on the watershed between the middle Luangwa River and the Zambezi. In the town is a major road junction, with a surfaced road (the T6 road) branching off and running 50 km to the Mozambique border and connecting with Tete on the Zambezi 339 km to the south-east.

== History ==
Although Katete is now centred on a Great East Road junction, in the 1950s Katete was a small government settlement down a dirt side-track. At the road junction there was just a rudimentary "filling station" (with a manually operated fuel pump). A handful of shops run by Indian traders included a general store-cum-grocery, and a haberdasher with tailors operating treadle sewing machines on the verandah.

The Katete settlement was to service an "NRG" (Northern Rhodesia Government) secondary technical school for African male students. The school had a brickyard where mud bricks were handmade and kiln-fired. Subjects included woodwork, agriculture, sugar-making (from sugar cane), and leather tanning. Academic subjects such as arithmetic and sciences were also taught. The teachers, who were mainly European, lived in bungalows in the settlement. Neither the schools nor the teachers' houses had mains electricity, lighting being provided by paraffin Tilley lamps. The school, which dealt specifically with adult education, became known as the Area School and was part of the Eastern Province's "NRG Development Area". The school became a centre for a mass literacy programme in the Chichewa language, its students including women. This programme was based on the Frank Laubach system and refined by Hope Hay whose husband, Rev Arthur Hay, was the founder and first principle of the school.

Katete was a transport and bus stop on the Great East road for the Thatcher Hobson Service, a small commercial centre. To the south of Katete was the NRG administrative and educational settlement, while the St Francis Church mission hospital and an agricultural research station lay to the North. The surrounding farmland included several tobacco estates established by white settlers.
