= Chirundu District =

Coordinates: 16°08′S 28°41′E

- District
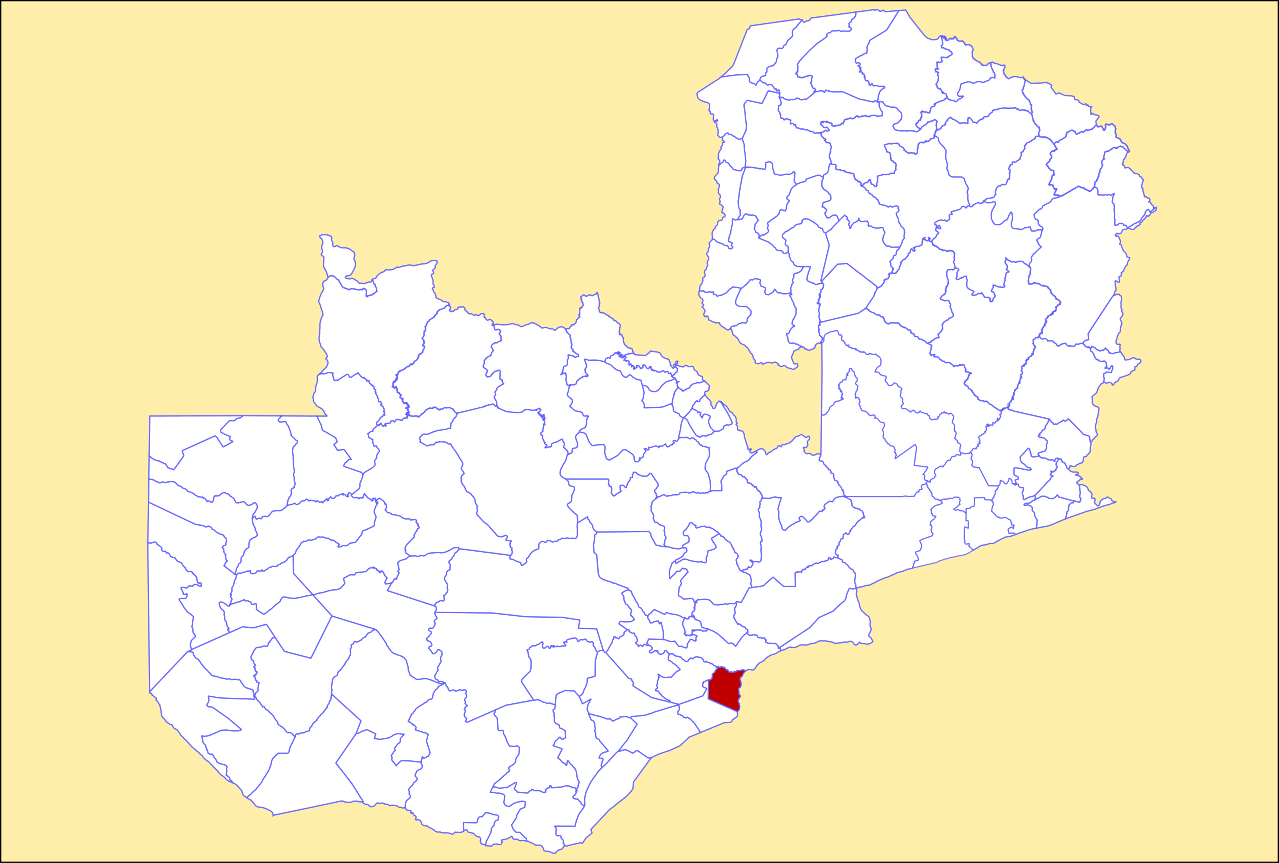
- District location in Zambia
- Country: Zambia
- Province: Southern Province

Area
  - Total: 1,386 km^{2} (535 sq mi)

Population (2022)
  - Total: 78,780
  - Density: 56.84/km^{2} (147.2/sq mi)
- Time zone: UTC+2 (CAT)

Chirundu District is a district of Southern Province, Zambia. Its headquarters is Chirundu. It was separated from Siavonga District by President Michael Sata in 2012. As of the 2022 Zambian Census, the district had a population of 78,780 people.

== History ==
Before 2012, Chirundu was part of Siavonga District in the Southern Province of Zambia. Then, President Michael Sata decided in 2012 to create the Chirundu District (which consequentially led to the Chirundu Constituency being created for the next general election), effectively declaring that Chirundu will have its own town council administration (no-longer under Siavonga). Afterwards, the President decided to move Chirundu District from Southern Province to Lusaka Province while Siavonga would remain in Southern Province.

Nine years later, on 17 November 2021, President Hakainde Hichilema announced his intention to reverse the move done by late former President Michael Sata. President Hichilema officially declared Chirundu as part of Southern Province (no-longer part of Lusaka Province), thereby returning the district to its original province, with the support of some chiefs.
