= Chirundu Bridge =

Bridge in Zimbabwe, crossing the Zimbabwe–Zambia border

Otto Beit Bridge
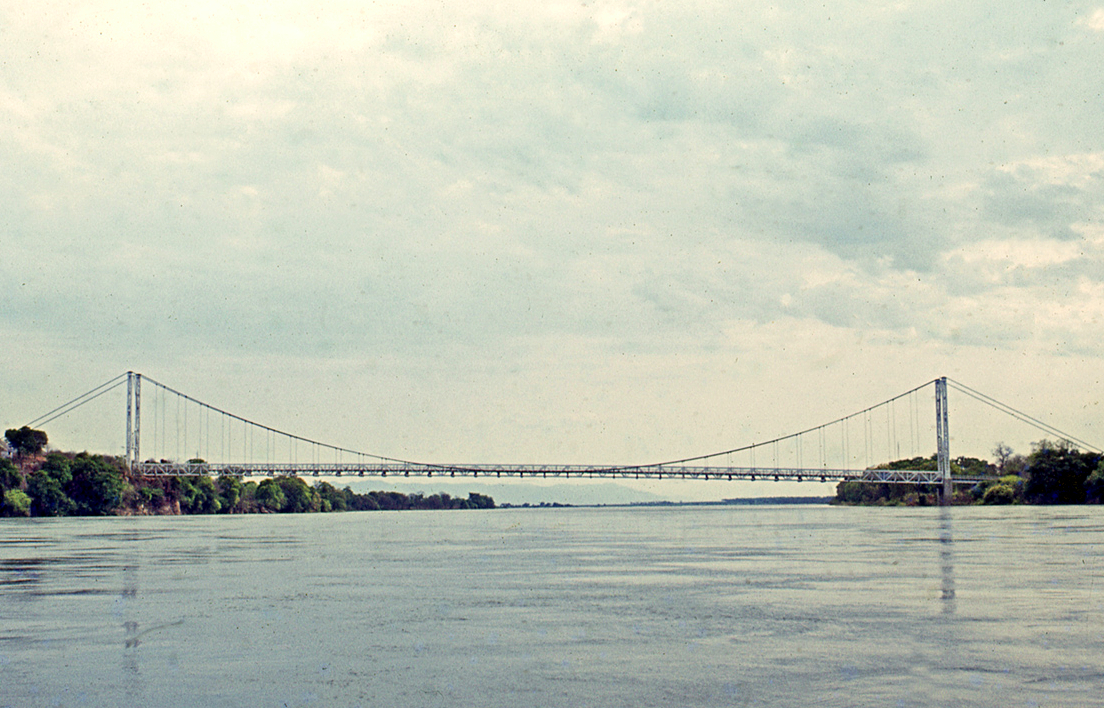
- The Otto Beit Bridge at Chirundu
- Coordinates: 16°02′18″S 28°51′08″E
- Carries: road
- Crosses: Zambezi River
- Locale: Chirundu, Zambia to Chirundu, Zimbabwe, crossing the Zimbabwe-Zambia border

Characteristics
- Design: Suspension Bridge
- Total length: 382 metres (1,253 ft)
- Longest span: 320 metres (1,050 ft)

History
- Designer: Freeman Fox & Partners
- Constructed by: Dorman Long
- Construction start: 1938
- Construction end: 1939

The Chirundu Bridge now consists of two road bridges side by side across the Zambezi River between the small town of Chirundu, Zambia and the village of Chirundu, Zimbabwe. At this location around 65 km downstream from the Kariba Dam the river is about 400 m wide. The bridges were once seen as part of a Cape to Cairo Road and thus are on the Harare to Lusaka section of the route.

Chirundu is the only town on the Zambezi where two bridges cross the river.

== The Otto Beit Bridge (1939) ==
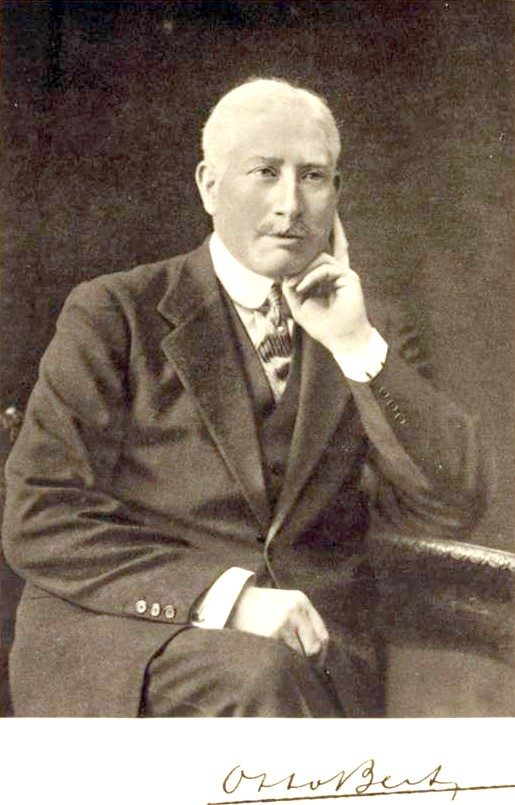
Otto Beit (1865–1930)

The first Chirundu Bridge is the Otto Beit Bridge built in 1938-9 by Dorman Long and financed by the Beit Trust, which funded most of central and southern Africa's colonial era bridges including the Beit Bridge across the Limpopo River, the Kafue Bridge, and the Luangwa Bridge. The Otto Beit Bridge was the first modern suspension bridge outside the United States built with parallel wire cables. It has a span of 382 m (main span 320 m). As it was built two decades before the Kariba Dam, the engineers had to consider the annual Zambezi flood, now tamed by the dam: hence the requirement for a single span (which the second bridge did not need). It cost £186,000 to build and was opened on 24 May 1939 by Lady Lillian Beit, widow of Otto Beit.

The Otto Beit Bridge is a single-lane bridge, with traffic operating in alternating directions, leading to congestion. Secondly the maintenance of steel suspension bridges is considerable, with cables needing replacement when they corrode, and the age of the bridge also places restrictions on the loads it can carry. Consequently, Zambia and Zimbabwe identified the need for a second bridge.

== Second Chirundu Bridge (2002) ==
The second Chirundu Bridge was built by the Kajima Corporation in 2000–2002 and opened on 12 December 2002. It is 90 metres upstream from the Otto Beit Bridge, using the same approaches and border control area. It is a two-lane, three-span continuous prestressed concrete box girder bridge, 400 meters long and 10.3 meters wide.

The pre-contract services started around August 1999 and Nippon-Koei Co. Ltd were the project engineering consultants with Chodai Co. Ltd consulting engineers as bridge specialists.

As counterpart contribution to the new Chirundu Bridge, both the governments of Zambia and Zimbabwe were to upgrade their respective Border Facilities to enhance smoother flow of traffic and quicker processing of cross-border trading documents, with eventual view to convert the Border to a One-Stop Border Facility.

== See also ==
- List of crossings of the Zambezi River
- List of international bridges
