= Chirundu, Zambia =

Chirundu
- Town
- Location within Zambia
- Coordinates: 16°03′S 28°50′E
- Country: Zambia
- Province: Southern Province
- District: Chirundu District

Population
  - Total: 84,750
- Time zone: UTC+2 (SAST)

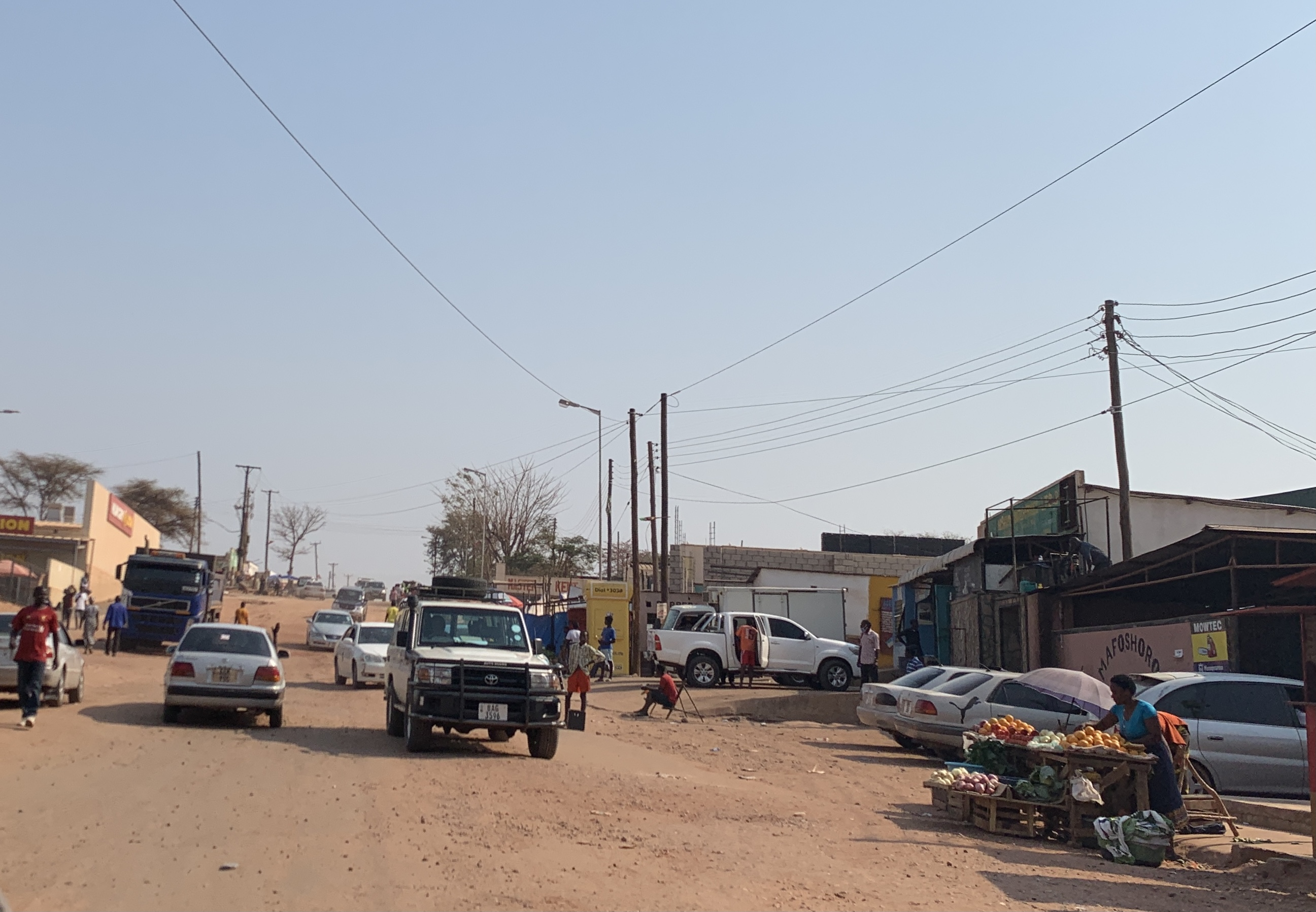
Chirundu

Chirundu, Zambia is a town in the Southern Province of Zambia at the border with Zimbabwe. It is the site of two road bridges across the Zambezi river, the Chirundu Bridges.

The Chirundu Petrified Forest is an area of fossil trees 21 km west of Chirundu, lying just south of the road from Chrundu to Kafue near the junction with the road to Siavonga. It is a listed National Monument of Zambia. It contains fossilised or petrified tree trunks of the Karoo age.

On the Zimbabwe side of the Zambezi, the township is also called Chirundu.
