= Chipata =

- City
- Chipata
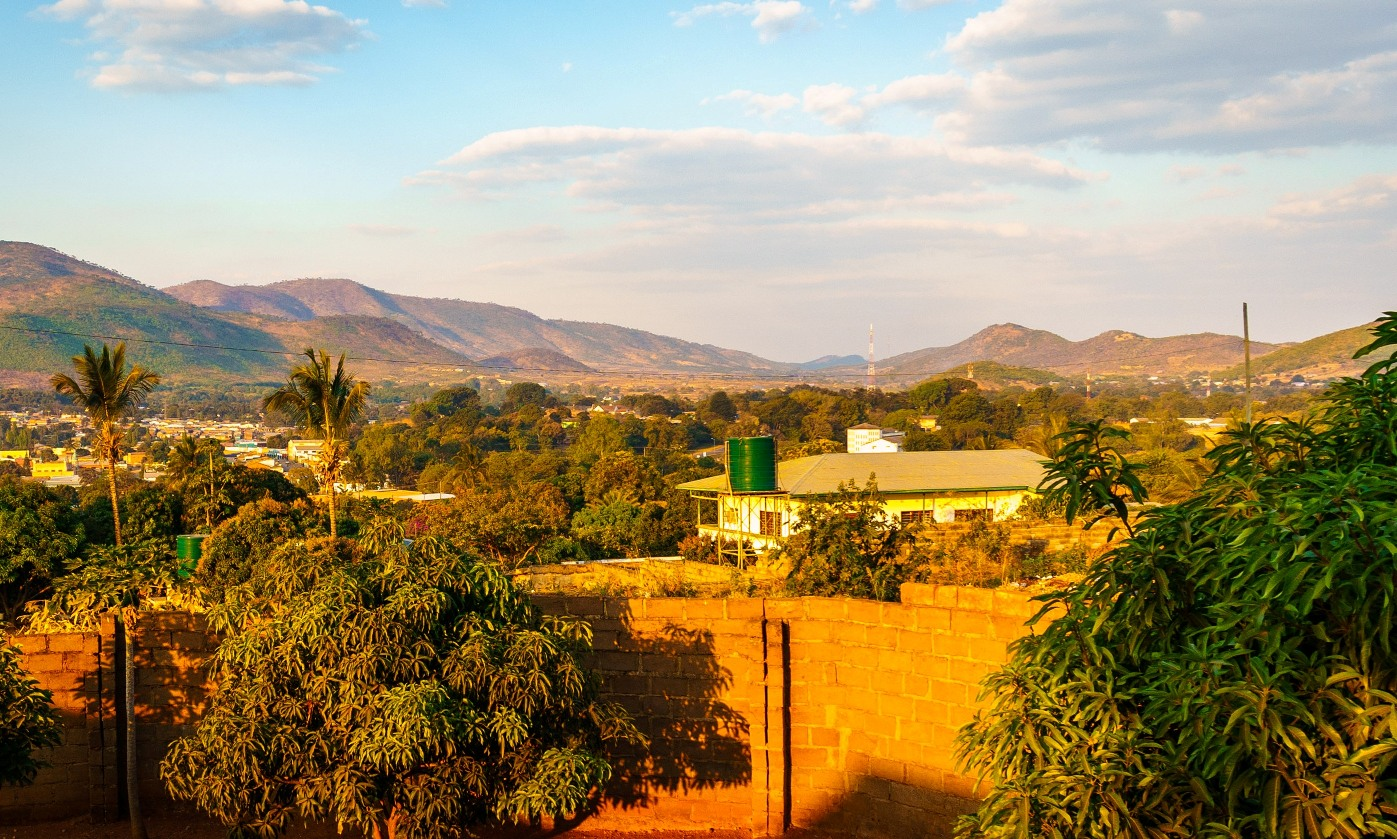

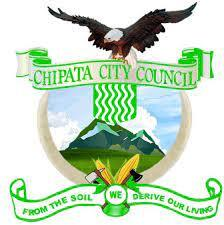
- Seal

- Location in Zambia
- Coordinates: 13°38′43″S 32°38′47″E
- Country: Zambia
- Province: Eastern Province
- District: Chipata District
- Founded: 1898; 128 years ago
- City status: 2017

Government
  - Type: Local Government
  - Mayor: Johnstone Silungwe

Area
  - Urban: 59.44 sq mi (153.94 km^{2})
- Elevation: 3,875 ft (1,181 m)

Population (2022)
  - City: 327,059
  - Density: 501/sq mi (193.4/km^{2})
- Time zone: UTC+2 (CAT)
- Postal code: 51
- Area code: +260 216
- Climate: Aw

Chipata is a city and administrative centre of the Eastern Province of Zambia and Chipata District. It was declared the 5th city of the country, after Lusaka, Ndola, Kitwe and Livingstone, by President Edgar Lungu on 24 February 2017. The city has undergone rapid economic and infrastructure growth in the years, leading up to city status.

== Location ==
Chipata is located on the Great East Road, approximately 570 kilometres (354 mi) east of Lusaka, the capital city of Zambia. This is about 150 kilometres (93 mi) west of Lilongwe, the capital city of Malawi. The geographical coordinates of Chipata are 13°38′43.0″S, 32°38′47.0″E. The average elevation of Chipata is 1,181 metres (3,875 ft), above sea level.

== Overview ==
Having a modern market, a central hospital, shopping malls, a university, some colleges and a number of schools, Chipata is the business and administrative hub of the region. The town boasts a four star hotel, a golf course, an airport, and a "welcome arch". Developed areas includes Kalongwezi, Moth, and Little Bombay.

Chipata is the regional head of the Ngoni of Zambia. The Ngoni adopted the languages of the tribes they conquered, so Chewa and Nsenga are the principal languages, although Tumbuka and English are widely spoken, plus some Indian languages, as a large number of Zambian Indians live in the town. It is located near the border with Malawi, and lies on the Great East Road which connects the capitals Lilongwe 150 kilometres (93 mi) to the east, and Lusaka 570 kilometres (354 mi) to the west. It is a popular access point for the South Luangwa National Park, which is 100 kilometres (62 mi) to the north-west.

== History ==
Chipata's name comes from the Chewa word "Chimpata" meaning "large space", in reference to the town's situation in a shallow valley between hills. The name of the central neighbourhood of Kapata, the original centre of town, comes from the Chewa word meaning "small space."

Chipata was formerly known as Fort Jameson (and informally as "Fort Jimmy"), being named after Sir Leander Starr Jameson, the 19th-century British politician and adventurer. Even during the colonial period, few supported that Jameson, who is mainly known for his part in the infamous Jameson Raid, fully deserved the honour of having any town named after him. Like 'Fort Manning' and 'Fort Rosebery', Fort Jameson was called a "fort" because the local government offices, or "Boma", were once fortified.

Fort Jameson was the capital of the British protectorate of North-Eastern Rhodesia between 1900 and 1911.

During World War II, 80 Polish refugees escaping from German- and Soviet-occupied Poland, were admitted in Fort Jameson in 1941.

== Government ==
The mayor of the city of Chipata is the head of the city government.

== Population ==
With a population of about 327,059 in 2022, Chipata District is believed to be the 8th largest district of the country. The city of Chipata had 193,288 inhabitants in 2022. The predominant ethnic groups in the city are the Chewa, Tumbuka, Ngoni and Nsenga.

== Economy ==
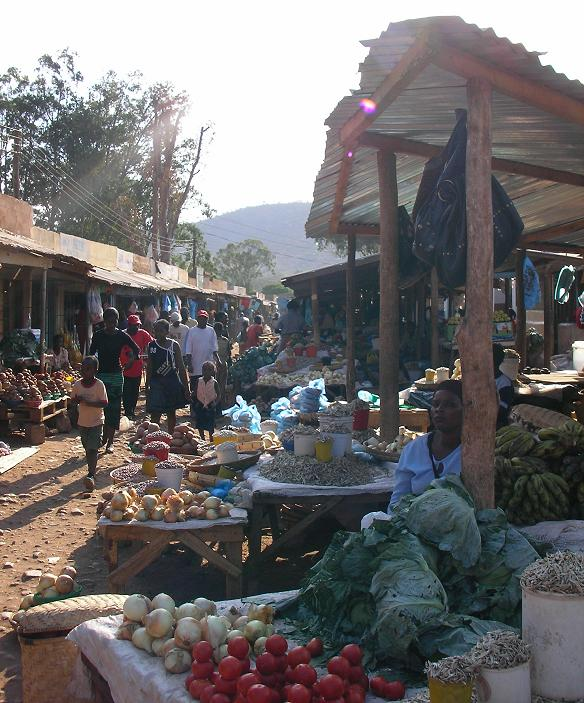
Saturday Market in Chipata

Chipata is the primary transport hub for trade between Zambia and Malawi. "Down Shops" is Chipata's bustling down-town area, most shops and other businesses having proprietors of Indian origin.

== Tourism ==
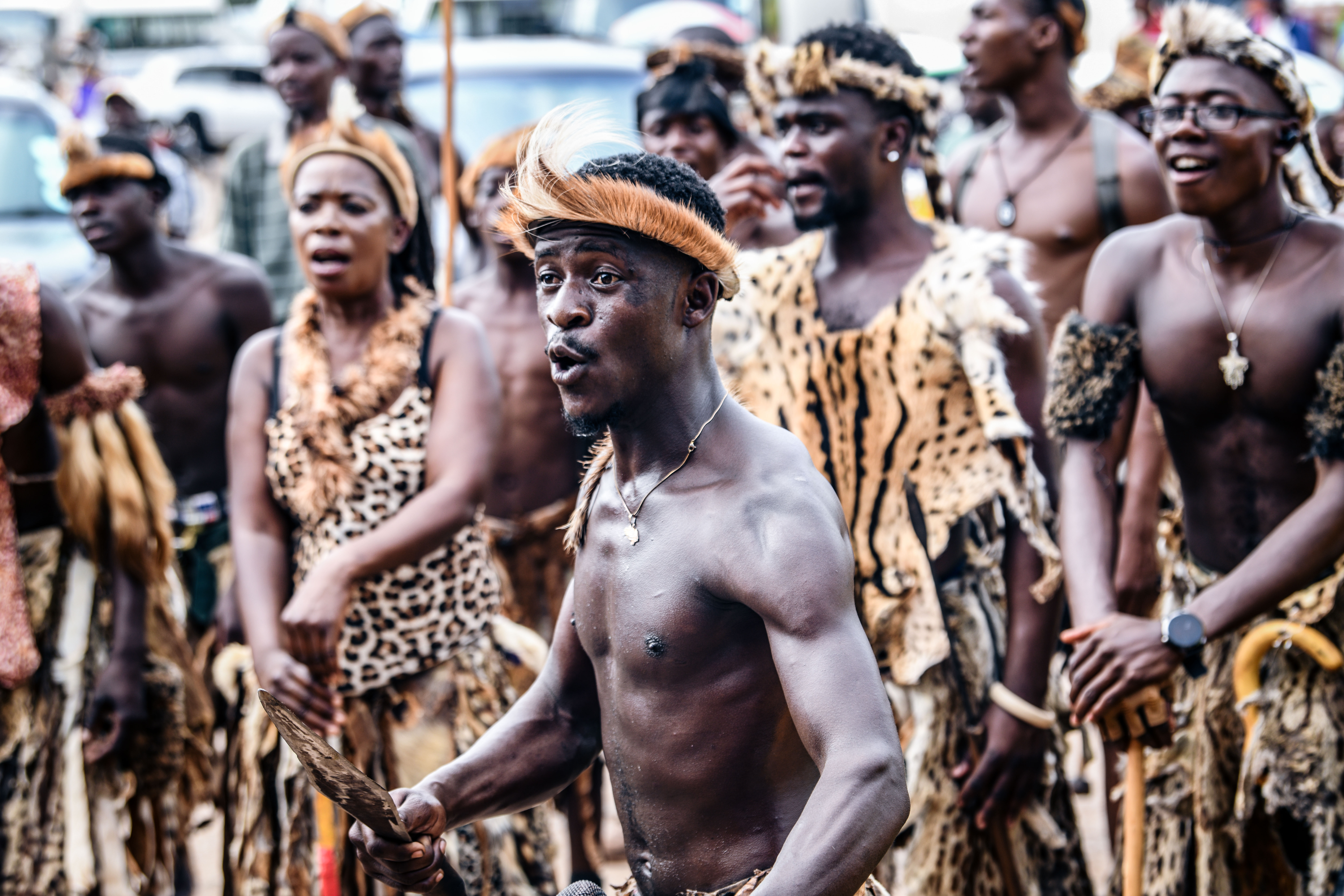
Ngoni Worriers During the Nc'wala Ceremony.

The Nc'wala ceremony of the Ngoni people takes place at Mutenguleni on the outskirts of Chipata. The ceremony celebrates the first fruits harvest and is usually held at the end of February.

== Transport ==
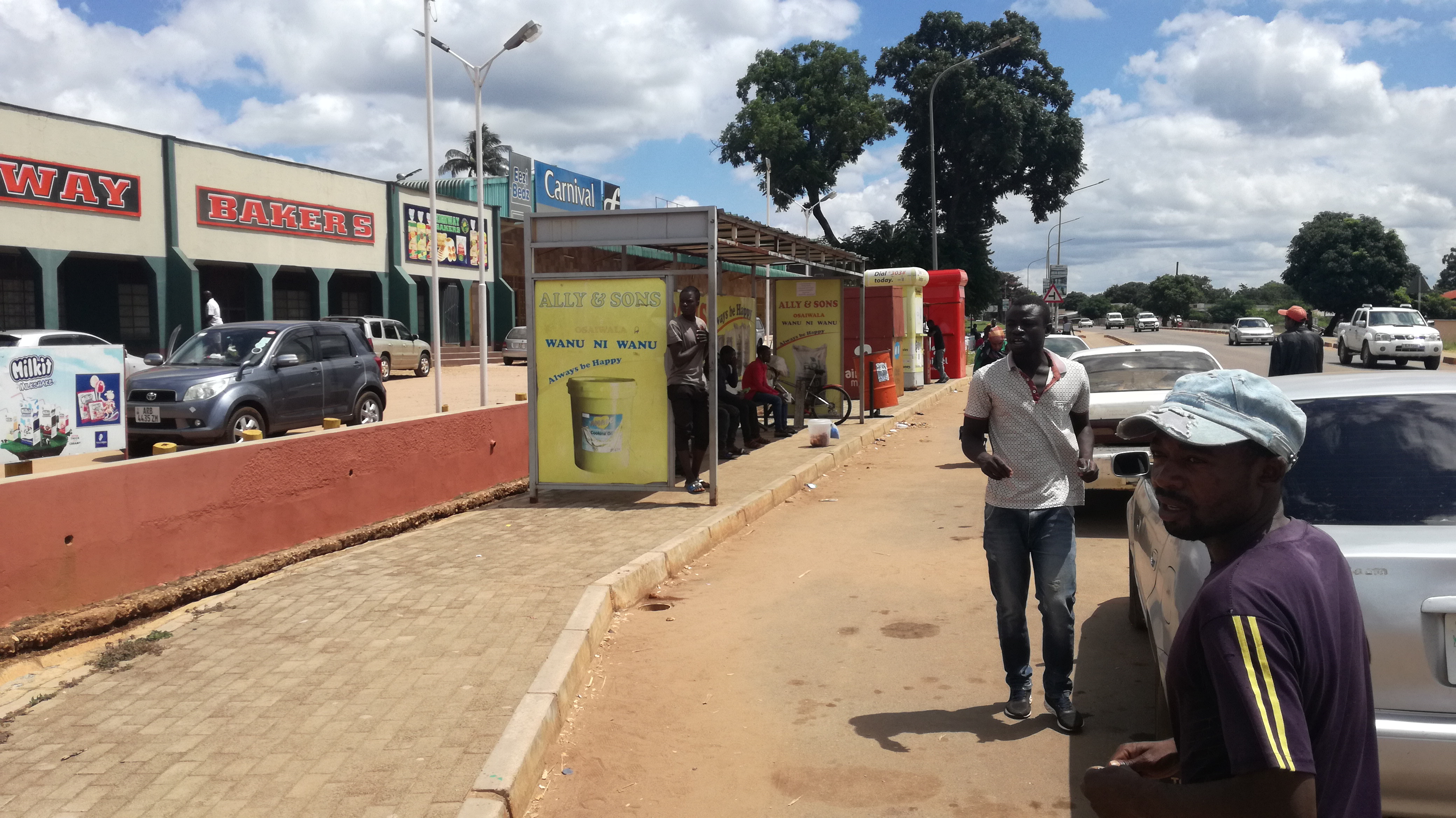
Bus and taxi stop shelter on Great East Road

=== Rail ===
An extension of the Sena railway, connecting the city of Chipata to the territory of Malawi (via Mchinji) was opened in August 2011. Since then, Chipata acts as the Zambian railhead and entry point from Malawi and beyond. In the pipeline since 1982, the short link, about 35 kilometres (22 mi), provides a through-route for rail traffic from Zambia via Malawi to the Indian Ocean deep-water port at Nacala in Mozambique. The route and alignment of the line has been laid out, including the site of Chipata station and the basic station building.

The route provides an alternative to two existing rail routes to the Indian Ocean, at Dar es Salaam and Beira. In 2015 it was proposed to build a rail link from Chipata through Petauke to Serenje, a town on the TAZARA Railway line.

=== Road ===
The T4 road (Great East Road) connects Chipata with Lusaka to the west (570 kilometres away) and the Mwami border with Malawi to the east (20 kilometres away).

The M12 road connects Chipata with Lundazi to the north (180 kilometres away). The D104 road connects Chipata with its airport (12 kilometers away) as well as to Mfuwe and the South Luangwa National Park to the north-west (100 kilometres away). The D128 road connects Chipata with Chadiza to the south-west (65 kilometres away). The D804 road connects Chipata with Vubwi to the south-east (60 kilometres away).

== Rivers ==
Chipata has four major streams pouring into the Luangwa river. The Luangwa river rises in the Lilonda and Mafinga Hills in north-east Zambia at an elevation of around 1500 meters near the border with Tanzania and Malawi, and flows in a southwesterly direction through a broad valley. The water from the streams and the Luangwa river is used for farming by the inhabitants around the district.

== Soil and vegetation ==
There are three main soil types: acrisols, fersiallitic soils, and lithosols. There are four vegetation types, the main one being the brachystegia (miombo) woodland and munga vegetation types.

== Climate ==
Chipata features a tropical savanna climate (Köppen: Aw) with wet and dry seasons. Summers are characterized by warm to hot temperatures, reaching peak values in October and November. Winters are milder, with July being the coolest month. The wet season, from November to March, experiences high humidity and significant rainfall. The dry season, from May to October, is marked by minimal precipitation.

Climate data for Chipata (Msekera Research Station) (1991–2020, extremes 1961–2020)
Month	Jan	Feb	Mar	Apr	May	Jun	Jul	Aug	Sep	Oct	Nov	Dec	Year
Record high °C (°F)	36.1 (97.0)	39.2 (102.6)	34.0 (93.2)	35.3 (95.5)	33.2 (91.8)	32.2 (90.0)	32.2 (90.0)	34.9 (94.8)	39.4 (102.9)	40.0 (104.0)	39.5 (103.1)	39.0 (102.2)	40.0 (104.0)
Mean daily maximum °C (°F)	28.5 (83.3)	29.0 (84.2)	29.0 (84.2)	29.0 (84.2)	28.4 (83.1)	27.0 (80.6)	26.6 (79.9)	28.8 (83.8)	32.1 (89.8)	33.5 (92.3)	33.4 (92.1)	30.2 (86.4)	29.6 (85.3)
Daily mean °C (°F)	23.7 (74.7)	23.8 (74.8)	23.6 (74.5)	22.8 (73.0)	21.3 (70.3)	19.6 (67.3)	18.9 (66.0)	21.1 (70.0)	24.4 (75.9)	26.4 (79.5)	26.8 (80.2)	24.7 (76.5)	23.1 (73.6)
Mean daily minimum °C (°F)	18.9 (66.0)	18.6 (65.5)	18.2 (64.8)	16.6 (61.9)	14.2 (57.6)	12.2 (54.0)	11.2 (52.2)	13.4 (56.1)	16.7 (62.1)	19.3 (66.7)	20.2 (68.4)	19.2 (66.6)	16.6 (61.9)
Record low °C (°F)	12.8 (55.0)	13.2 (55.8)	11.8 (53.2)	9.7 (49.5)	5.8 (42.4)	3.3 (37.9)	4.0 (39.2)	3.7 (38.7)	7.2 (45.0)	11.3 (52.3)	12.8 (55.0)	13.3 (55.9)	3.3 (37.9)
Average precipitation mm (inches)	268.0 (10.55)	226.3 (8.91)	209.5 (8.25)	32.3 (1.27)	5.8 (0.23)	0.0 (0.0)	0.0 (0.0)	0.2 (0.01)	0.1 (0.00)	17.3 (0.68)	80.9 (3.19)	248.3 (9.78)	1,088.6 (42.86)
Average relative humidity (%)	80.7	81.5	78.8	72.1	64.4	59.8	55.9	48.9	42.7	45.2	56.6	75.4	63.5
Mean monthly sunshine hours	158.1	148.4	201.5	234.0	266.6	258.0	260.4	275.9	276.0	269.7	216.0	167.4	2,732
Source: NOAA (humidity, sun 1961–1990)

== Suburbs ==
- Kalongwezi
- Kalongwezi Extension
- Kapata
- Umodzi
- Moth
- Muchini
- Nabvutika
- Little Bombay
- Mchenga
- Damview
- Old Gym
- New Gym
- Chimwemwe
- Magazine
- Eastrise
- Walela
- Chawama
- Munga
- Chipata Motel
- Nadalitsika
- Katopola
- Maferendum
- Rose
- Hillview
- Gash
- Msekera
- Messengers
- David Kaunda area
- Hollywood
- Kalongola site and service
- Hillview
- Chimzere
- Gondar Barracks
- Highlands
- Aslot

== See also ==
- Railway stations in Zambia
- Railway stations in Malawi
- Transport in Zambia
- Transport in Malawi
