= Nyimba District =

- District
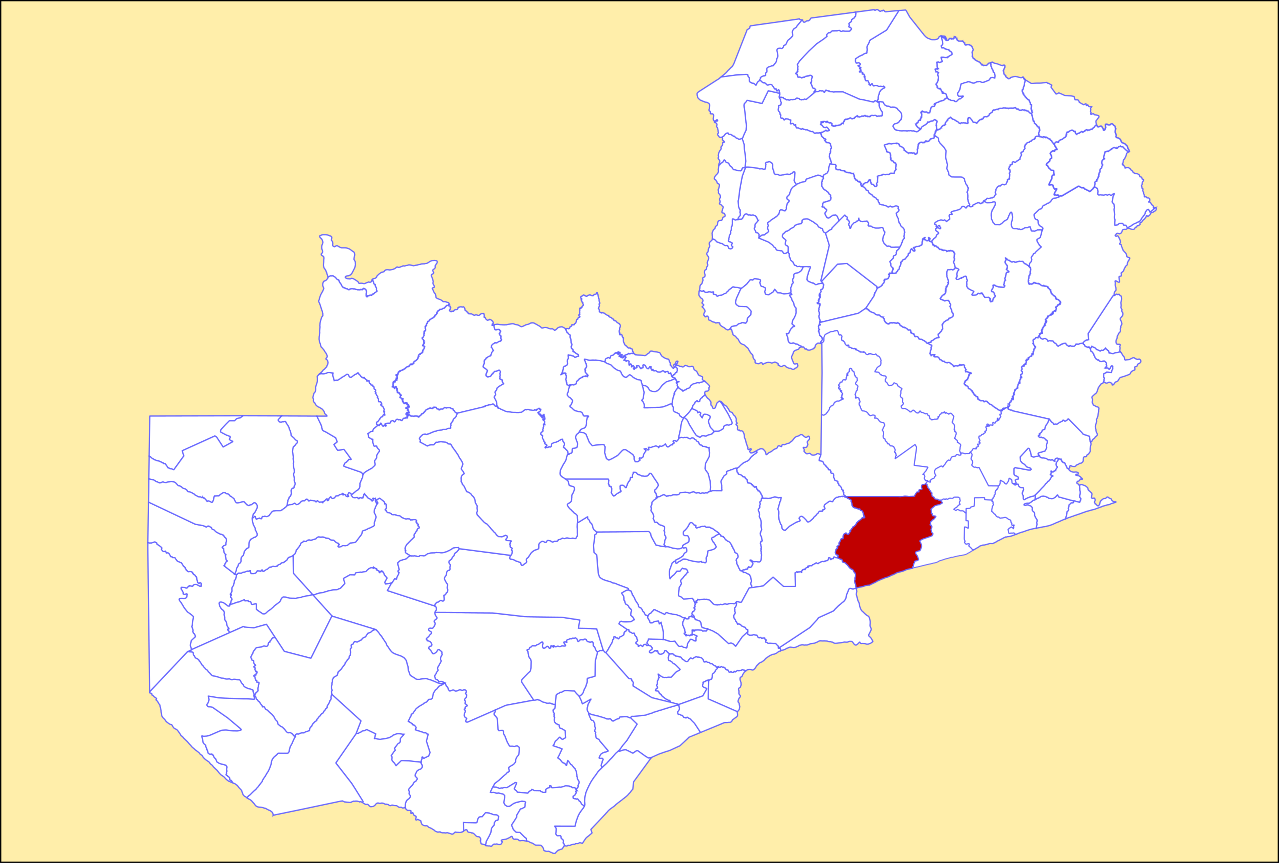
- Location in Zambia
- Coordinates: 14°21′S 30°35′E
- Country: Zambia
- Province: Eastern Province
- Capital: Nyimba

Area
  - Total: 10,495.4 km^{2} (4,052.3 sq mi)

Population (2022)
  - Total: 136,238
  - Density: 12.9807/km^{2} (33.6199/sq mi)
- Time zone: UTC+2 (CAT)

The Nyimba District is a district of Zambia, located in the Eastern Province. The capital lies at Nyimba. As of the 2022 Zambian Census, the district currently has a population of 136,238 people.
