= Mathew Mulanda =

Zambian politician (1938–2014)

Deputy Minister for Copperbelt Province
- In office 1997–2006

Member of the National Assembly for Chifubu
- In office 2002–2006
- Preceded by: David Mulenga
- Succeeded by: Benson Bwalya

Member of the National Assembly for Bwana Mkubwa
- In office 1996–2001
- Preceded by: Andrew Kashita
- Succeeded by: Paul Katema

Personal details
- Born: 15 March 1938
- Died: 24 February 2014 (aged 75) Ndola, Zambia
- Party: Movement for Multi-Party Democracy
- Profession: Brewing

Mathew Sampa Mulanda (15 March 1938 – 24 February 2014) was a Zambian politician. He served as Member of the National Assembly for two different constituencies between 1996 and 2006 and was Deputy Minister for Copperbelt Province between 1997 and 2006.

== Biography ==
Born in 1938, Mulanda attended primary school in Kasama before attending Munali Secondary School in Lusaka between 1956 and 1960. He then attended Ithaca College in the United States from 1961 until 1964, earning a diploma in chemistry. After returning to Zambia, he was employed as a technical officer in the Ministry of Mines. In 1970 he joined Northern Breweries in Ndola as a trainee brewer. He attended Heriot-Watt University for a diploma in brewing, which he completed in 1974. Upon his return to Zambia he was made Senior Brewer, before being promoted to Brew Master in 1976.

In 1979 Mulanda was appointed Brewery Manager at the company's plant in Lusaka, where he worked for eight years, before being made manager of the Ndola plant. In 1994 he became Managing Director of Northern Breweries, holding the post until 1997. Mulanda had also become involved in politics after becoming one of the founder members of the Movement for Multi-Party Democracy (MMD), and was elected secretary of the party's Meshi branch, before becoming chair of the party in Ndola District in 1994, a role he held until 2006. He was also a councillor on Ndola City Council.

Mulanda was the MMD candidate in Bwana Mkubwa in the 1996 general election, and was elected to the National Assembly, succeeding the MMD's Andrew Kashita. He subsequently became Deputy Minister for Copperbelt Province in 1997. Prior to the 2001 general elections, he was selected as the MMD candidate for Chifubu constituency in place of the incumbent MMD MP David Mulenga. Mulanda went on to win the seat to become MP for Chifubu and retained his position as Deputy Minister for Copperbelt Province. He subsequently became Vice-President of the Southern African Development Community Parliamentary Forum, and served as Chair of the National Assembly Budget Estimates Committee. He did not contest the 2006 general elections, which saw the Chifubu seat won by Benson Bwalya of the Patriotic Front.

In 2007 Mulanda left the MMD to join the Patriotic Front. Although he later became a member of the party's central committee, he returned to the MMD in 2010.

Mulanda died in Ndola Central Hospital from complications related to diabetes in February 2014 and was buried at Kansenshi Cemetery in Ndola. He had eight children.
