= Lobito–Lusaka Oil Products Pipeline =

Oil products pipeline in Southern Africa

Location
- Country: Angola; Zambia
- Coordinates: 15°18′49″S 23°09′45″E
- Direction: West to East
- Start: Lobito, Angola
- Passes through: Mongu, Zambia
- To: Lusaka, Zambia

General information
- Type: Refined oil products pipeline
- Partners: Sonangol; IDC Zambia Limited; Strategic Investor(s)
- Commissioned: 2026 (Expected)

Technical information
- Length: 870 mi (1,400 km)

The Lobito–Lusaka Oil Products Pipeline, also Angola–Zambia Oil Pipeline (AZOP), is a proposed pipeline to transport refined petroleum products from Angola's port city of Lobito to the city of Lusaka, the capital of Zambia. Various parties in Angola and Zambia have signed memoranda of understanding (MOUs) about the subject in the past, one in 2012, and another one on 29 April 2021.

== Location ==
The pipeline is expected to originate at the planned Lobito Oil Refinery, in the town of Lobito on the Atlantic Ocean along Angola's western coast. The pipeline would then wind its way eastwards and slightly southwards to end in Zambia's capital city of Lusaka. The estimated total distance traveled by this pipeline is approximately 1,400 kilometres (870 mi), from end to end.

== Background ==
Zambia is a land-locked country in central-southern Africa. It imports most of its petroleum products, refined in the Middle East, through the Tanzanian port of Dar es Salaam.

Zambia's Indeni Petroleum Refinery in Ndola, was built in 1973 and has capacity of 24,000 bbl/d (3,800 m3/d), insufficient to meet the country's fuel needs, now nearly 50 years later. In addition, due to the age of the hardware and antiquated technology, the refinery is not able to refine pure crude at commercial levels and instead processes spiked crude.

Zambian authorities have explored various ways to deliver petroleum products to their population, sustainably, in sufficient quantities, at affordable cost. There is the option of expansion and improving the Indeni Refinery. There is the option of building a refined oil products pipeline from Tanzania to Zambia. The newest option is the construction of the AZOP, as a public private partnership infrastructure project.

== Way forward ==
As of May 2021, what is being proposed in a cluster of pipes to carry various petroleum products including (a) petrol (b) jet fuel (c) diesel (d) kerosene and (e) liquid petroleum gas (LPG). The Lobito Refinery is expected to have capacity of 200,000 bbl/day, of which 100,000 bbl/day of distillate will be allocated to Zambia, through this pipeline.

After feasibility studies and environmental & social impact assessment studies, between 2021 and 2023, a decision will be made, whether to proceed. The quoted price for this project is reported to be as high as US$5 billion. As of July 2022, the feasibility assessments were continuing, with new considerations whether to extend the pipeline to some of Zambia's neighboring countries.

== See also ==
- Tazama Pipeline
- Tanzania–Zambia Petroleum Products Pipeline
