= Emmanuel Chenda =

Zambian politician and diplomat

Ambassador to Zimbabwe
- In office November 2017 – January 2023
- Succeeded by: Derick Livune

Minister of Local Government and Housing
- In office March 2014 – February 2015
- Preceded by: Emerine Kabanshi
- Succeeded by: Robert Sichinga

Minister of Commerce, Trade and Industry
- In office February 2013 – March 2014
- Preceded by: Robert Sichinga
- Succeeded by: John Phiri

Minister of Agriculture and Livestock
- In office September 2011 – February 2013
- Succeeded by: Robert Sichinga

Member of the National Assembly for Bwana Mkubwa
- In office 2011–2016
- Preceded by: Joseph Zulu
- Succeeded by: Jonas Chanda

Personal details
- Born: 25 December 1952 (age 73)
- Party: Patriotic Front
- Profession: Accountant

Emmanuel Tawanda Chenda (born 25 December 1952) is a Zambian politician and diplomat. He served as Member of the National Assembly for Bwana Mkubwa between 2011 and 2016. He also held the posts of Minister of Agriculture and Livestock, Minister of Commerce, Trade and Industry and Minister of Local Government and Housing between 2011 and 2015. In November 2017 he was appointed Ambassador to neighbouring Zimbabwe.

== Biography ==
Chenda studied for a certificate in mediation and arbitration, a diploma in accountancy and a post-graduate diploma in development finance and worked as an accountant. In 1986 he was appointed Treasurer of Lusaka City Council, before sering as Town Clerk of Ndola between 1991 and 2001.

Chenda contested the Bwana Mkubwa seat in the 2001 general elections as the Forum for Democracy and Development candidate, but was defeated by Paul Katema of the Movement for Multi-Party Democracy. He ran again in the 2011 general elections representing the Patriotic Front (PF) after the incumbent PF MP Joseph Zulu was expelled from the party, and was elected to the National Assembly.

After being elected, Chenda was appointed Minister of Agriculture and Livestock. In February 2013 he was made Minister of Commerce, Trade and Industry, In March 2014 he became Minister of Local Government and Housing. He lost his place in the government in February 2015 when new President Edgar Lungu appointed a new cabinet.

Chenda did not run in the 2016 general elections and was succeeded as MP for Bwana Mkubwa by PF candidate Jonas Chanda. In November 2017 he was appointed Ambassador to Zimbabwe and served up to January 2023.
