= Tanzania–Zambia Petroleum Products Pipeline =

Central African oil pipeline

Location
- Country: Tanzania; Zambia
- Coordinates: 08°59′01″S 33°27′06″E
- Direction: East to West
- Start: Dar es Salaam, Tanzania
- Passes through: Morogoro, Tanzania; Mbeya, Tanzania
- To: Ndola. Zambia

General information
- Type: Oil pipeline
- Partners: Government of Tanzania & Government of Zambia

Technical information
- Length: 838 mi (1,349 km)

The Tanzania–Zambia Petroleum Products Pipeline (TZPPP) is a proposed pipeline to transport refined petroleum products from Tanzania's sea-port of Dar es Salaam on the Indian Ocean through central Tanzania and northern Zambia to the Zambian mining city of Ndola, in the Copperbelt Province.

== Location ==
The pipeline would originate in Dar es Salaam, Tanzania's financial capital and largest city and travel in a general south-westerly direction, through the Tanzanian regions of Morogoro, Iringa, Njombe, Mbeya and Songwe. The pipeline would end in the city of Ndola, Copperbelt Province, in Zambia, a total distance of 1,349 kilometres (838 mi).

== Overview ==
Zambia, a land-locked Southern African country depends on its neighbor, Tanzania for the majority of its oil imports, sourced mainly from the Middle Eastern countries. This pipeline would ease the transportation of petroleum products to Zambia and to many inland regions of Tanzania, where the pipeline will pass.

== Other pipelines ==
The two countries already have an oil pipeline between them, the Tanzania–Zambia Crude Oil Pipeline.

== See also ==
- East African Crude Oil Pipeline
- Lobito–Lusaka Oil Products Pipeline
