= Murder of Lilian Burton =

1960 assault and burning in Copperbelt, Northern Rhodesia

- Location: Near Ndola, Copperbelt, Northern Rhodesia
- Date: 8 May 1960; ~1:00 p.m. (UTC+2)
- Attack type: Burning, beating
- Deaths: 1
- Injuries: 2
- Victim: Lilian Burton
- Accused: 4
- Charges: Murder
- Verdict: Guilty
- Convictions: Murder
- Convicted: 4
- Judge: Justice J. R. Blagde

On 8 May 1960, Lilian Margaret Burton, a white Northern Rhodesian woman, was attacked by Africans affiliated with the United National Independence Party (UNIP) while driving her car in the Copperbelt; she died in hospital eight days later. Four black men were convicted of murder, and were executed in November 1961. The attack took place during a period of conflict in the area, and the Federation of Rhodesia and Nyasaland broadly, with rising tensions between European settlers and Africans.

== Background ==
=== Political situation ===
Mere years prior, the situation for whites in Northern Rhodesia had been much more advantageous, however, wages for a white miner had fallen from £700 in 1957, to £200 in 1960; partly due to the falling price of copper, down by about half. In 1958/9, UNIP split from NRANC, adopting a more militant approach. With the coming independence of the Belgian Congo, cars were arriving from Élizabethville carrying the wives and children of Belgians who did not wish for their families to remain there post independence; however the question of how long Rhodesia could stay the "safe side of the border" remained.

Lawlessness had been on the rise in the area for a period, with 12 cars in total having been stoned around the Ndola area. In particular, this was attributed to growing racial tension, and the more militant approach which was used by the United National Independence Party. Shortly before the attack on Burton, a white truck driver had been driving outside Ndola, having left a welfare meeting for coloured people; his truck was stopped by an African mob. Stones were thrown against the truck, and petrol thrown inside, however the driver reversed and drove away before the petrol could be lit; after warning other drivers, he informed the police.

=== Lilian Burton ===
Lilian Margaret Burton (whose name is occasionally incorrectly spelled as Lillian) was born in London. She married Robert Burton (described as a "wiry little man"), an engineer. She was a 39-year-old housewife, and had four children: Christine (13), Rosemary (12), Debbie (4), Nicola (2), all described as "pretty". She was not politically involved.

=== Perpetrators ===
The four men found guilty were:

- Edward Cresta Ngebe, 27-years-old, unemployed, formerly a clerk, the ringleader of the incident
- Chanda John (also known as Bernard), 26-years-old, self-employed painting contractor, living in Chifubu Location, Ndola
- James Paikani Phiri, 19/22-years-old, unemployed
- Robin Kangwa Kamima (or Kamina), 18/19-years-old, unemployed

== Killing ==
=== Prior ===
On Sunday, 8 May, a UNIP meeting of about 350 Africans at Kaunda Square, Chifubu Location had been broken up by the Mobile Unit, due to it being unauthorised. Riots subsequently took place at the beer halls, in which the four perpetrators took part. Two groups then went along the road leading to the Ndola/Mufulira road; one led by a bearded man, Mandevu, and another by the fourth accused, Ngebe. The groups were armed with sticks and stones, and intent on violence. The former group reached the road first, while Ngebe's group encountered a butchery lorry, which he ordered be parked at the side of the road. The keys were removed, and the driver was forced to join the group. They subsequently met a second vehicle, a car driven by Baloboza Mutenge, who had a hosepipe; it was later alleged by the prosecution that Kamima took a tin from the butchery lorry, and filled it with petrol using this hosepipe; which was later used to ignite Burton's car. Thirdly, the encountered a Bedford lorry, from which three occupants were forced to join the group. Ngebe's group surrounded a Central African Road Services bus, on which Chanda John was.

=== Attack ===
That day, Burton, with two of her daughters (Rosemary and Debbie), and pet spaniel (Toffee), was driving home in her Morris Traveller to Kaniki Plots, from Ndola, using the Mufulira road. At around 1:00pm, after having overtaken the bus, but the car stopped about 300 yards later, since the group led by Mandevu was in front of it; Burton was unable to drive through this crowd. The car was then ambushed and surrounded by a mob of blacks, led by Ngebe, numbering roughly 30, which was said to be affiliated with the UNIP, demonstrating against the colonial government. They had previously attacked other motorists on the road.

The car's windows and windscreen were smashed, after which a petrol can was picked up. Seeing this, Burton shouted "Don't do it! Don't!" Despite this, the petrol was thrown into the front of the car, and then ignited. Realising what was happening, Rosemary grabbed her sister (who suffered minor burns) and took her out of the car via the rear seat; while their mother remained inside. When Burton was hit with a stick, the spaniel jumped to bite him, subsequently burning alive in the car. Eventually, Burton managed to exit the vehicle through the passenger door (the driver's door was locked), her clothes and hair on fire. Rosemary told her to roll on the ground, which she did, "writhing". The three were subsequently brutally assaulted and beaten, being kicked and hit with "big sticks". Burton's clothes were torn off. During the attack, Burton allegedly said "don't kill me, I am on the side of the Africans." A toolbox was stolen from the boot of the car, by Chanda John.

Eventually, Burton managed to get her and her daughters away, and they wandered into a bush, where Burton said she was "tired, and wanted to lie down".

=== Hospital ===
After some time had passed, she was noticed in the bush by an African, who stopped a passing motorist, who in turn picked Burton up, bringing her to Ndola Hospital, where she was admitted at 1:50pm; as were the two daughters. At admission, she was in extreme shock, wearing only shoes and a brassiere. About 70% or 75% of her body was burned, mostly third degree, also with extensive bruising. She was sent flowers by Africans from the village where the attackers had come from; her doctor said that after seeing them, she had said "There must be some hope for the country."

In her time in hospital, she requested that white settlers did not avenge her death with reprisal attacks against Africans, nor to hold bitterness against them, a sentiment later echoed by her husband, Robert, after her death. Burton eventually succumbed to her injuries, with the hospital reporting her death at 3:00am on 16 May 1960. It was later suggested that the beating, rather than the burning, ultimately killed her. The daughters were still in hospital at the time.

== Legal proceedings ==
A police investigation promptly began; with Edward Cresta Ngebe being arrested in the morning of Saturday 28 May 1960. That same afternoon, he appeared before the senior provincial commissioner at Ndola, and was charged with murder, remanded into custody, and given legal aid. On 13 June 1960, a request was made for the case to be moved from the court of the senior provincial commissioner to the subordinate court class I of the resident magistrate; which was granted by Justice Windham.

The three others accused were arrested between the 14th and 18th of June 1960, all eventually appearing in court on a joint charge. When they all appeared before the resident magistrate, J. W. Cronin, Esq., on 18 June, with three refusing legal aid when offered (which they later retracted). Subsequently, the case was remanded until 24 June, as the resident magistrate had an enquiry (required by section 116 of the Juveniles Ordinance) to ascertain if the second and third accused, John Paikani Phiri and Robin Kangwa Kamima, were juveniles. For this, radiologist Mrs. J. H. Storrs and Dr. J. Muller of the Federal Ministry of Health were called, producing a radiological examination to ascertain if there had been a complete fusion of the bones; given the evidence, it was found that neither were juveniles.

The court reconvened on 27 June, where Mr. P. H. Counsell, the Crown counsel, prosecuted the preliminary inquiry. The fourth accused was represented by lawyer Mr. S. Pearce from Kitwe,having accepted legal aid. The next day, the Crown presented 20 witnesses, and requested that the venue of the inquiry be moved to another place, in the interests of security, as well as due to the risk of fear and intimidation of key witnesses. In accordance, the resident magistrate ordered it be adjourned to Solwezi (200 miles north), resuming on Friday 1 July. It resumed there, continuing for a further 5 days, with an additional 26 witnesses, mostly eye witnesses, though some were also brought from Élizabethville (due to the fourth accused claiming an alibi there), being called by the Crown. Due to the independence of the Belgian Congo, the latter witness proved difficult to obtain.

The court returned to Ndola, where it sat for a further 6 days, after which the resident magistrate committed all four to the sessions there, in order to stand their trial. As the Crown closed the evidence for the prosecution, the first three accused chose to give evidence to the subordinate court, given under oath. Their testimonies came to greater importance under cross-examination, as they sought to retract or significantly alter their statements. All the accused subsequently requested legal aid, which was granted.

All information given was then exhibited at the High Court, where the accused were called before Mr. Justice Somerhough, in September 1960, being jointly charged with murder. This trial was attended by Miss Lynn Westwood, a palantypist, to keep complete records of the proceedings, with speeches and evidence being tape recorded. The trial lasted for 35 days, before Counsell was taken ill, and the trial was adjourned. Before the trial could resume, however, Justice Somerhough died in hospital, aged 53, forcing a new trial.

Subsequently, a new trial began, before Mr. Justice J. R. Blagden, beginning on 8 November 1960. Counsell and Mr. D. A. O'Connor, the same Crown counsel as in the previous trial, remained in place, as did the defence counsel. Aerial photographs were employed by the prosecution.

Three of the four accused tried to maintain alibis they had claimed at the preliminary enquiry, however this was abandoned by their counsels; as the Crown had evidence to contradict such alibis. The prosecution witnesses were cross-examined based on their previously inconsistent statements, including in the previous trial, which at times contradicted what was said in the second. All four accused opted to give evidence on their behalves, calling no witnesses for it; Chanda John admitted to having stolen a toolbox, however denied participating in the attack, saying he had just followed Ngebe. However, under cross-examination, he admitted he had been standing just 5 feet away from Burton as she was being beaten, and agreed he had not been forced to join the group.

Phiri claimed he had been apart from the groups, and gone towards the Mufulira road (abandoning his previous claimed alibi), however he had difficulty explaining how several items which were clearly the property of Burton had come into his possession, which he distributed shortly after the incident. Kamima denied being part of Ngebe's group, saying he had been forced to go to the Mufulira road, however this story was not accepted, due to inconsistencies between it and the story he had given at the preliminary inquiry. Ngebe claimed to have ran towards Burton's car to protect its occupants from mob violence, admitting to going to Burton when she was on the ground, in an effort to stop her being beaten; he further admitted that he went to the Kitwe road with Chanda (and others), on which other incidents involving stoning took place.

Four African assessors were present at the trial, of which one was only prepared to find the four guilty of manslaughter; their opinions took 88 pages in the trial record. The judge delivered his verdict, stating that "he did not think that there was a specific intention to kill", but added that "each accused had full knowledge that the acts which they were committing or the commission of which they were aiding and abetting, were such that death or grievous harm to someone was not only a probable result but indeed practically an inevitable result, and that despite such knowledge they persisted in what they were doing", which meant that "malice aforethought" was established and each accused was thus convicted under section 177 of the Penal Code, for murder. All except Phiri were then sentenced to death on 13 March 1961, due to an uncertainty around Phiri's age at the time of the attack. To determine it, a medical radiologist from Salisbury Central European Hospital, Dr. Sidney Ashley Elk, gave expert evidence of his research, assessing age by observing the fusion of bone structure; it was deemed clear from the X-rays and available evidence, that Phiri was over the age of 18 at the time of the attack; the judge accordingly sentenced him to death on 5 April 1961, with the trial closing on 7 April 1961. Walima Kalusa later, in 2011, alleged that the evidence in the trial was incomplete, pointing to the judge's concession that the evidence was often contradictory and at times included "outright fabrications by the police and prosecution witnesses".

=== Appeals ===
All four appealed the judgement at the Federal Supreme Court at Lusaka (with the same defence counsels), which commenced on 19 June 1961. However, as the Acting Chief Justice collapsed after leaving the court, the appeal was adjourned. Following this, the Chief Justice of the Federation, Sir John Clayden, presided, and after a 4 day hearing, each appeal was dismissed, on the 14th of July 1961. They then filed petitions for leave to appeal to the Privy Council, which were dismissed, without the Crown replying to the submissions.

The four guilty men were executed at Livingstone Prison, on Wednesday 22 November 1961.

== Reactions ==
=== Funeral ===
Burton's coffin was placed in the Anglican Cathedral of Ndola at 3pm the day after she died, to lay in state, covered in the Federation flag, and a cross of red and white roses, reading "to the best and bravest mummy and wife in the world", from her family. Many whites came to pay tribute, with "sobbing women" kneeling beside it. Some officials had opposed the lying in state, fearing it would inflame tensions. A fund was organised by a group of Europeans to assist the family, which by 18 May had raised about £500 (£10,300 in 2026), which would nearly cover the flight to London.

On Saturday 21 May, Robert and the four children landed in London, flying from Northern Rhodesia. In June, he expressed a desire to return to Northern Rhodesia, saying "you can never get anywhere by turning your back". After five weeks in England, he and his daughters boarded the SS Dunbar Castle on Wednesday 29 June 1960. He had conceived of an idea for an "Institute of Race Relations", for which he felt "time was desperately short", and thus he planned for the institute to be practical rather than theoretical; the idea had been formulated following his wife's appeal against reprisals from hospital following the attack.

=== European Settlers ===
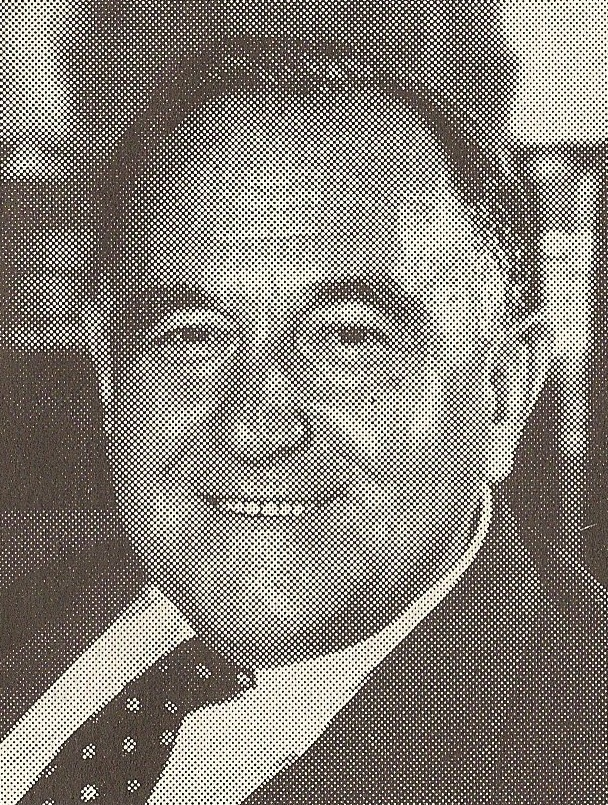
Sir Roy Welensky in 1960, the year of the killing

Conservative white Northern Rhodesian settlers, who reacted to the attack with a combination of revulsion, indignation, and xenophobia", with the Northern News newspaper, controlled by the Prime Minister Sir Roy Welensky, echoing their sentiments. In Kitwe, a meeting of over 2000 whites took place, which passed a resolution to take up arms, and where two government ministers, Rodney Malcomson (territorial minister) and Frank Owen (commerce minister), denounced the perpetrators as "heartless rats" and murderers; both supported the attenders' calls for action against the UNIP, assuring them that Welensky would exterminate them if the colonial governor, Sir Evelyn Hone, did not take action.

Government officials feared that Burton's death could result in more violence in the Copperbelt, with the British United Press reporting that Europeans in Ndola were "seething with fury about the attack". Frank Barber wrote in the News Chronicle that Europeans were "unable to persuade themselves that it would not happen again." A member of the Legislative Council, Bill Rendall, said that the state should "shed its kid gloves in dealing with [African] primitive savagery", and to restrict hours in which blacks would be allowed to move, remove the unemployed to rural areas, and ban the UNIP. Within days of the attack, Governor Hone said the state was "‘resolute that violence in all its manifestations in this territory shall be stamped out", with the Preservation of Public Security Ordinance being passed, which allowed the police the powers to arrest and detain any person, without warrant, who was suspected of possessing arms, petrol, explosives, or missiles. There was racial strife following the attack; only three weeks after the attack on Burton, a 16-year-old white schoolboy, Kenneth Harris, had petrol thrown over him and was set alight by an African, three miles from where Burton was attacked.

Many adopted Burton's death as a symbol to attempt and solidify their control of the colony, as well as to attempt to escape rule from the Colonial Office, which was considered an obstacle to attaining Dominion status. However, this was opposed by more liberal settlers, including the Capricorn Africa Society, who sought to include western-educated blacks in the political system. At the same time, many were keen to leave the colony, with a Dutch shop assistant saying he was saving money to return to Amsterdam; and a French woman from Bordeaux asking "Why am I here?"; while there was no widespread panic, many Europeans were "working with one eye on the airways time-table".

Anthony Lejeune wrote in the Daily Express that while "very few white people living in Africa dislike the Africans", their "dislike" and "bitterness" was instead "increasingly directed towards comfortable liberals in Britain and America who gaily applaud the wind of change, without any understanding of what that wind might bring".

The attack had taken place shortly before a three week visit by Queen Elizabeth the Queen Mother to the Federation, a visit for which security was ramped up, and police reservists called up. During her visit to the Copperbelt, gatherings of both Europeans and Africans were banned, in order to lessen tensions, according to the senior provincial commissioner, Mr J. P. Murray.

The same month Burton was killed, in Salisbury, Rhodesia, children gathered a memorial fund for Toffee, the cocker spaniel killed.

=== African ===
The Catholic Bishop of Ndola, Rev. Francis Mazzieri, warned his congregation that if they were involved in the stoning and burning of cars, shops, or houses, they would be excommunicated.

The attack further emboldened radical African nationalists; the UNIP was "unrepentant", and continued with its violent strategies, resulting ultimately in the Cha-cha-cha campaign, which consisted of the destruction of civilian infrastructure.

=== British ===
On 10 May 1960, Iain Macleod, the Secretary of State for the Colonies, stated that the "whole House [would] condemn" the attack on Burton.

In Parliament on 15 February 1962, Sir John Biggs-Davison asked the Secretary of State for the Colonies about any new evidence offered to the Northern Rhodesian authorities on the topic of the murder; to which he was told there was none. He further enquired on any action taken against members of the publications and members of the UNIP, who he stated had "hailed those convicted of this atrocious murder as political martyrs".
