= Katema =

Katema is a surname. Notable people with the surname include:

- Emmanuel Katema, Zambian boxer
- Joseph Katema (1961–2026), Zambian politician
- Paul Katema, several people
