= Gävle University College =

University college in Gävle, Sweden

Coordinates: 60.667°N 17.118°E

University of Gävle
- Högskolan i Gävle
- Motto: For a sustainable human living environment
- Type: Public
- Established: 1977; 49 years ago
- Vice-Chancellor: Ylva Fältholm
- Director: Micael Melander
- Administrative staff: 519 (2012)
- Students: 16,000
- Doctoral students: 53 (2012)
- Location: Gävle, Sweden
- Website: www.hig.se

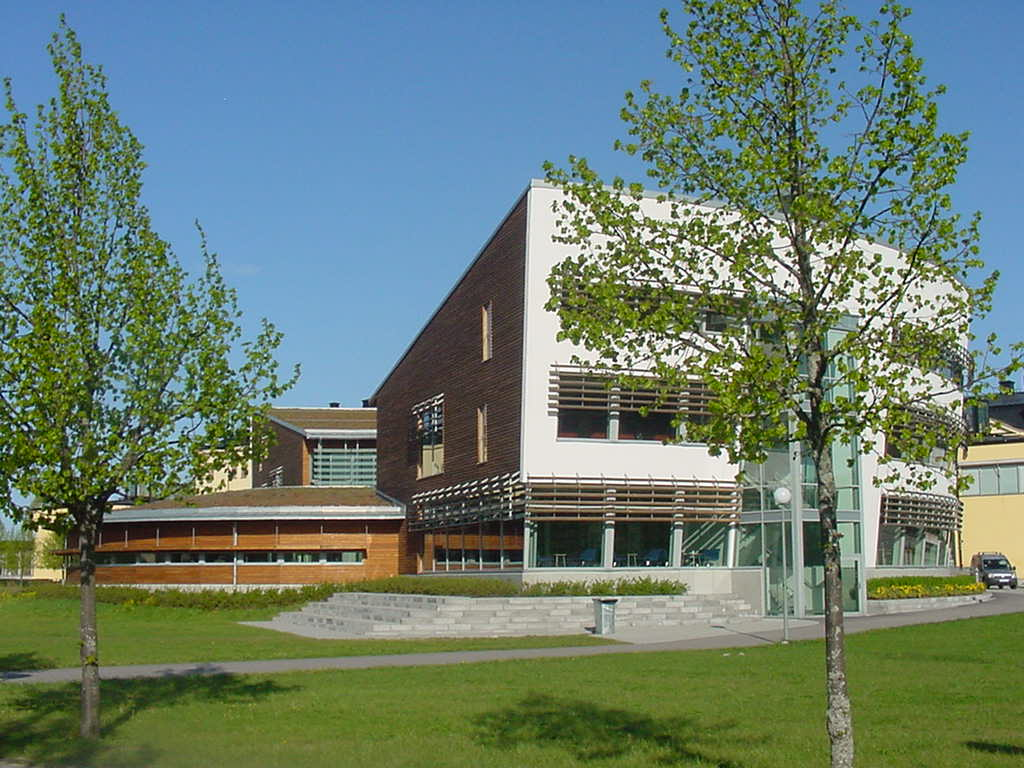
The University of Gävle Library

University of Gävle (Swedish: Högskolan i Gävle) is a university college (högskola) located in Gävle, Sweden. It uses the name "University of Gävle" in English, although it is officially a 'University College'. The university was established in 1977 and is currently organized into three academies and nine departments.

The university offers around 45 masters- and bachelor's degrees and 800 courses in technology, social- and natural sciences and the humanities. The university's postgraduate education at the Ph.D level is through the KTH research school, a collaboration between the university and the Royal Institute of Technology Stockholm. Currently the KTH research school is directed by Professor Christer Sjostrom with several professorships specializing in different subjects including geographic information systems or GeoInformatics. In June 2010, the University of Gävle was granted the right to award a PhD degree in the area of "Built Environment" ("Byggd miljö") and in 2012 "Health in working life" ("Hälsofrämjande arbetsliv")

The facilities of the campus consist of various buildings used by the Swedish infantry since 1909. The military stopped utilizing the buildings in 1993 after which, in 1997, the university's new campus was inaugurated. In 2006 a new library was added to the campus.

== Notable alumni ==
- Alan Kabanshi, engineer and researcher
