= Chifubu =

Neighbourhood of Ndola, Zambia

- Interactive map of Chifubu
- Location in Zambia
- Coordinates: 12°56′2″S 28°36′40″E
- Country: Zambia
- Province: Copperbelt Province
- District: Ndola District
- Main Place: Ndola

Chifubu is a small urban area in Ndola, Zambia. The township is part of the Chifubu constituency.
