= Paul Katema =

Paul Katema may refer to:

- Paul Katema (politician) (born 1954), Zambian politician
- Paul Katema (footballer) (born 1997), Zambian midfielder
