= Alan Kabanshi =

Zambian-Swedish engineer and professor

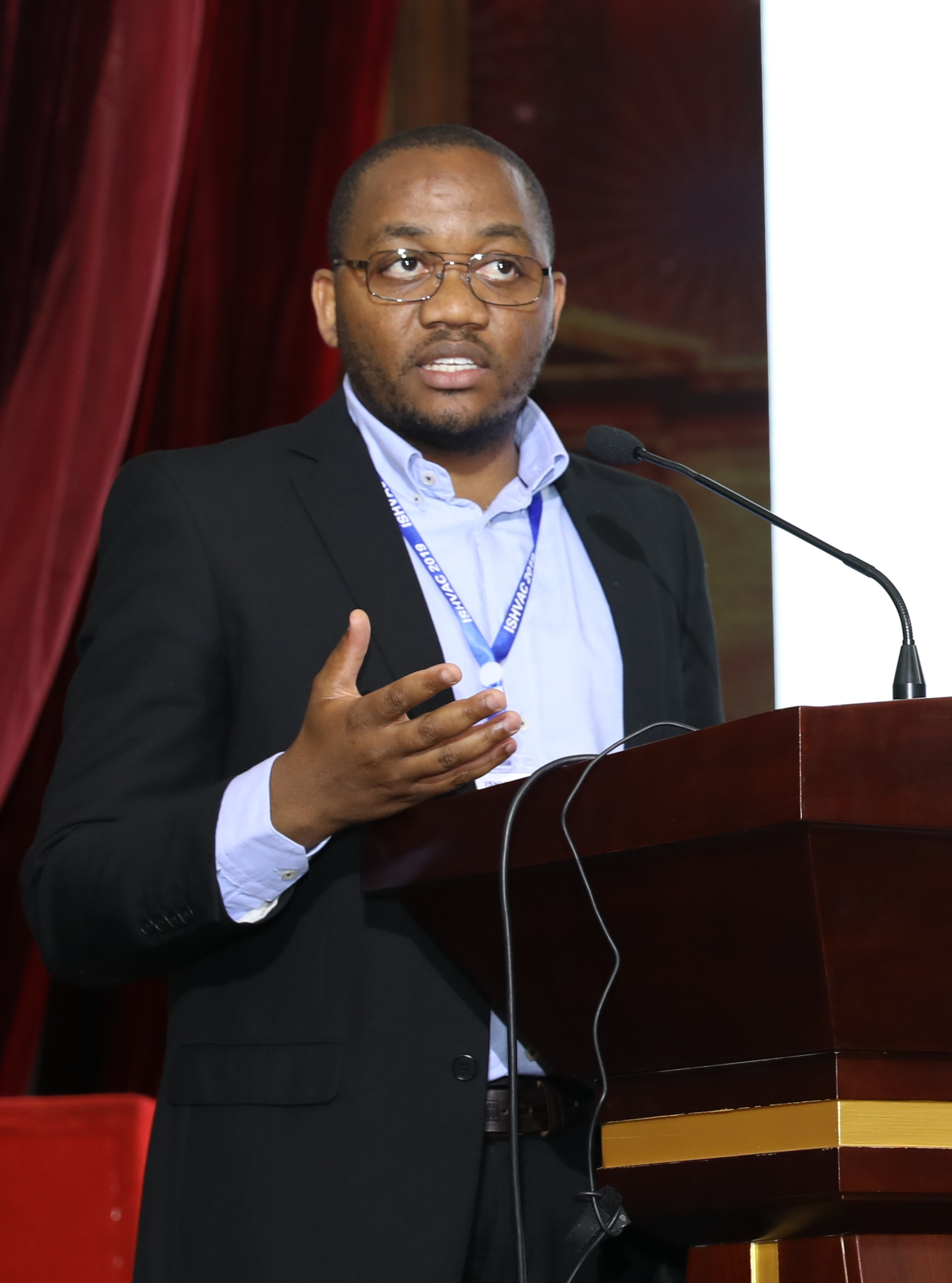
- Alan Kabanshi in 2019
- Born: March 17, 1985 (age 41); Ndola, Zambia
- Education: The Copperbelt University (BEng); University of Gävle (MSc & PhD)
- Children: 2
- Awards: The Royal Skyttean Society Prize for Young Researcher
- Scientific career
- Fields: Energy
- Workplaces: University of Gävle
- Thesis: Experimental study of an intermittent ventilation system in high occupancy spaces (2017)
- Doctoral advisor: Sörqvist Patrik, Wigö Hans, Ljung Robert
- Other academic advisors: Sandberg Mats

Alan Kabanshi is an engineer, researcher and associate professor of energy systems at the University of Gävle, Sweden. His work focuses on resource efficient systems in built environments, specializing in energy systems, sustainable building systems, Heating Ventilation and Air Conditioning (HVAC), and cognitive psychology of climate change. He also served as a co-director for the research programme Urban Transition under the profile Urban Sustainability.

== Early life and education ==
Alan Kabanshi was born on 17 March 1985 in Ndola, Copperbelt Province, Zambia. He attended Nkwazi primary school before transferring to Northrise primary school and later graduating high school at Kansenshi secondary school in 2003. He went on to pursue a bachelor's degree in mechanical and electrical engineering at The Copperbelt University (CBU), graduating in 2010. He joined Konkola Copper Mines Plc., as a Senior Assistant Engineer (SAE) from February 2010 to July 2011. In August 2011, he moved to Sweden for further studies and obtained a M.Sc. in 2012 and a Ph.D. in 2017 in Energy Systems. His PhD studies centered on building energy efficiency with a specialization in Heating, Ventilation, and Air-Conditioning (HVAC) systems under the supervision of Prof. Patrik Sörqvist, Associate Professors Hans Wigö and Robert Ljung. His Ph.D. thesis, titled "Experimental study of an intermittent ventilation system in high occupancy spaces," contributed to understanding and possible application of fluctuating ventilation supply for improved thermal comfort and indoor air quality at low building energy use. He has worked as a visiting researcher at the Center for the Built Environment (CBE) at the University of California-Berkeley from 2015 to 2016, and at the Department of Applied Physics and Electronics, Umeå University, Sweden in 2016.

== Career and Research ==
After completing his PhD, he took up a postdoctoral position under the mentorship of Prof. Mats Sandberg at the University of Gävle, focusing on fluid mechanics of free jets and their implications for contaminant transport and distribution. He was appointed as an assistant professor in 2019 and as an associate professor (docent) and senior lecturer in 2021 at the department of building engineering, energy systems and sustainability science at the University of Gävle. From Dec 2021 to Dec 2024, he served as co-director for Urban Transition research profile at the University of Gävle, focusing on transitional strategic planning and research on transitional pathways to sustainable energy and urban systems.

Kabanshi's research interests include energy efficiency, integration of renewable energy resources, fluid mechanics, indoor environmental quality (IEQ), building science, and environmental psychology. Some of Kabanshi's notable research contributions include air distribution strategies in buildings, understanding of unsteady ventilation airflow supply and the resulting augmentation effect of vortex shedding on indoor air quality and occupants perceived thermal climate, the effect of entrainment on defining ventilation in relation to indoor contaminants, dilution, and delivery of clean air. He has also explored research on cognitive psychology of climate change and energy related behavior. For example, motivations and psychological processes behind people's perceptions, judgements and behaviors regarding climate change and energy use/efficiency.

== Recognition ==
In 2020, Kabanshi received the prestigious Royal Skyttean Society prize (Swedish: Kungliga Skytteanska Samfundet) for young merited researcher, University of Gävle. His research paper at the 2018 Roomvent Conference in Espoo, Finland, was recognized among the best paper and his research paper at the 2024 Roomvent conference 2024 in Stockholm, Sweden, was awarded the best scientific paper at the conference because of its innovative and novel approach to model spatial and temporal aspects in risk of airborne infection transimission indoors. He is an editorial board member of Frontiers in Energy Research under sustainable energy systems and has served as guest editor for Sustainability and Building Journals.

His research has been covered in different media outlets, for example, his research project on the shortfalls of residential building design and ventilation in reducing the risk of indoor transmission of airborne diseases like COVID-19 has been discussed on Swedish television (SVT) and Swedish radio. He has also been covered in a local newspaper Arbetarbladet and Gefle Dagblad, Plåt&Vent Magasinet and other media sources. He has been invited to present at NORDBYGG, the Nordic region's largest meeting and conference for the building and construction industry and has appeared in an educational video on the importance of ventilation with the Swedish YouTuber Manfred Erlandsson.

== Selected works ==
A list of selected works can be found here.
