= Paul Katema (politician) =

Zambian politician (born 1954)

Member of the National Assembly for Bwana Mkubwa
- In office 2002–2006
- Preceded by: Mathew Mulanda
- Succeeded by: Joseph Zulu

Personal details
- Born: 23 February 1954 (age 72)
- Party: Movement for Multi-Party Democracy
- Profession: Marketing

Paul Chilufya Katema (born 23 February 1954) was a Zambian politician. He served as mayor of Ndola and as Member of the National Assembly for Bwana Mkubwa between 2002 and 2006.

== Biography ==
Katema worked in marketing, and served as mayor of Ndola during the late 1990s and early 2000s. He was the Movement for Multi-Party Democracy (MMD) candidate in Bwana Mkubwa in the 2001 general elections after the MMD incumbent Mathew Mulanda opted to contest the Chifubu seat. The elections saw Katema elected to the National Assembly.

Prior to the 2006 general elections, Katema was defeated by Barbara Bwalya-Chibulu in the MMD candidate selection vote for the Bwana Mkubwa seat. Bwalya-Chibulu went on to lose to Joseph Zulu of the Patriotic Front in the elections.
