= Andrew Kashita =

Zambian politician (1932–2020)

Minister of Works and Supply
- In office 1994–1995

Minister of Transport and Communications
- In office 1991–1994

Minister of Mines and Industry
- In office 1973–1975
- President: Kenneth Kaunda
- Preceded by: Humphrey Mulemba
- Succeeded by: Axon Soko

Member of the National Assembly for Bwana Mkubwa
- In office 1991–1996
- Succeeded by: Mathew Mulanda

Nominated Member of the National Assembly
- In office 1974–1975
- Succeeded by: James Mapoma

Personal details
- Born: 1932 Northern Rhodesia
- Died: 13 January 2020
- Party: UNIP, MMD
- Profession: Engineer, civil servant

Andrew Elias Kashita (1932 – 13 January 2020) was a Zambian politician. He served as Member of the National Assembly and held several ministerial posts.

== Biography ==
An engineer by training, Kashita became Permanent Secretary to the Ministry of Agriculture and then managing director of INDECO (Industrial Development Corporation of Zambia). He was appointed Minister of Mines and Industry in 1973, and was also given a nominated seat in the National Assembly. Following a dispute regarding his decision to reduce copper production by 15%, he was dismissed from the cabinet in January 1975, also losing his seat in parliament.

In 1990 Kashita returned to politics as one of the founder members of the Movement for Multi-Party Democracy. He was elected to the National Assembly in the Bwana Mkubwa constituency in the 1991 general elections, and was appointed Minister of Transport and Communications. He was later moved to become Minister of Works and Supply in a cabinet reshuffle in January 1994, but was sacked on 17 July 1995. He did not contest the 1996 general elections.

Kashita died on 13 January 2020.
