= Joseph Zulu =

Zambian politician (born 1952)

Member of the National Assembly for Bwana Mkubwa
- In office 2006–2011
- Preceded by: Paul Katema
- Succeeded by: Emmanuel Chenda

Personal details
- Born: 7 April 1952 (age 74)
- Party: Patriotic Front
- Profession: Civil engineer

Kasiti Joseph Zulu (born 7 April 1952) is a Zambian politician. He served as Member of the National Assembly for Bwana Mkubwa between 2006 and 2011.

== Biography ==
Zulu studied for diplomas in project management and civil engineering and earned an MBA in marketing and worked as a civil engineer. He was the Patriotic Front candidate in Bwana Mkubwa in the 2006 general elections, winning the seat from the Movement for Multi-Party Democracy (MMD).

Zulu was expelled from the Patriotic Front in February 2011. He was succeeded as the PF candidate for Bwana Mkubwa in the September 2011 general elections by Emmanuel Chenda, who went on to win the seat; Zulu did not run for re-election.

Zulu subsequently joined the MMD, becoming the party's Copperbelt Province chairman. However, he rejoined the PF in August 2015.
