= Philip Sabu =

Zambian footballer (1937-2008)

Personal information
- Full name: Philip Peyala
- Date of birth: 15 July 1937
- Place of birth: Ndola, Northern Rhodesia (present-day Zambia)
- Date of death: 27 April 2008 (aged 70)
- Position: Goalkeeper

Youth career
- Early 1950s: Main Masala

Senior career*
Years	Team	Apps	(Gls)
1950s-1964	Ndola Black Follies		(-)
1961-1965	Mufulira Blackpool		(-)
1965-1970	Ndola United		(-)
1973-?	Rhokana United		(-)
Mid-1970s-?	Mindola United		(-)

International career
1964-1968	Zambia national football team		
- * Club domestic league appearances and goals

Philip Peyala (15 July 1937 - 27 April 2008), popularly known as Philip Sabu was a Zambian goalkeeper. Popular with fans because of his acrobatics between the posts, Sabu was in the Zambia national team at independence in October 1964.

== Playing career ==
Sabu was born in Kapolopolo Compound in Ndola and started football rather late, aged 13. After playing in the junior and then the senior boys club at Main Masala, he joined the third team of the Ndola Black Follies. He was inspired by Ndola Home Defenders goalkeeper Yotham Mabange during the mid-1950s. The Follies trip to Rhokana United in 1957 was a turning point in young Sabu's career. The first and second team goalkeepers did not turn up so Sabu, who was 20 at the time, featured in all three games, winning all.

He started going by the nickname 'Sabu' and moved to Mufulira Blackpool in 1961 and had one of the best matches of his career during the final of the Castle Cup against Nchanga Rangers in October 1963. A week before the final, Blackpool had lost a league match 12–0 to Rangers but upset the odds 4–2 to win the trophy and the right to face off with Salisbury Callies for the coveted Inter-Rhodesia Castle Cup at Kafubu Stadium in Luanshya. Unfortunately, Blackpool lost to the Callies 2–0.

He was in the Zambian team that lost all its games during an independence tournament in October 1964 that featured Uganda, Kenya and Ghana, featuring against the latter. After four years with Blackpool, Sabu returned to Ndola in 1965 and joined Ndola United for a transfer fee of K700.

He was also in the team that played against Leicester City when the English side toured Zambia in May 1968. In the tourists’ second game played at Independence Stadium in Lusaka, Sabu was in goal and this turned out to be his last game for Zambia, which they lost 1–0. He got a boot in the neck when Leicester's outside-right Frank Large crashed into him and he ended up in hospital and was later discharged to find himself alone without food and transport. Still dressed in his goalkeeper's jersey and without any shoes, Sabu was neglected by Football Association of Zambia (FAZ) officials and help only came in the form of Donald Lightfoot, one of the organizers of the Leicester City trip who bought him some sandals and an air ticket to Ndola. He recovered his clothes from the Director of Sports’ office but after this experience, Sabu quit playing for Zambia.

That year, Ndola United had a very good season and were on top of the league going into the last game, needing only a draw to clinch their first ever league title. They however lost 2–1 to Mufulira Wanderers, even missing a late penalty that would have given them the point they needed and allowed Kabwe Warriors to snatch the title on goal difference.

On 18 August 1969, Ndola United beat Lusaka Tigers 2–1 in a Castle Cup quarterfinal in Lusaka and on their way back to Ndola, their bus overturned and three players lost their lives. Sabu survived the accident but suffered a dislocated shoulder.

In January 1970, Sabu announced his retirement from the game to the disappointment of his admirers, due to a series of injuries and consideration for his 12-year-old marriage. “I am always unhappy after a match.” He disclosed, “It didn’t matter how I left the field, hurt or unhurt, my wife never liked it. I had been playing football against her will."

He however made a comeback and played for Rhokana United in 1973 as well as second division side Mindola United, helping them win promotion to the top league in 1976. Sabu later served as Mindola's administration manager.

Philip Sabu died on 27 April 2008.
