= Warren Chisha Mwambazi =

Zambian politician and Chair of Public Accounts Committee

Member of Parliament for Bwana Mkubwa
- Incumbent
- Assumed office August 2021
- Preceded by: Jonas Chanda

Personal details
- Party: Independent (2021 - 2026) UPND (2026 - present)
- Profession: Accountant, Politician

Warren Chisha Mwambazi (born 18 December 1978) is a Zambian politician, accountant, and current Member of Parliament for Bwana Mkubwa, having been first elected in the 2021 general election.

== Education ==
Mwambazi holds a Bachelor of Laws degree and a Certificate in Accounting. By profession, he is an accountant with prior experience in financial management.

== Parliamentary career ==
In August 2021, Mwambazi was elected MP for Bwana Mkubwa, succeeding Jonas Kamima Chanda.

Almost immediately, he assumed backbench status and was appointed chairperson of the Public Accounts Committee (PAC) within Parliament.

In September 2022, he was formally reappointed as Chairperson of PAC.

As PAC Chair, Mwambazi frequently advocated for transparency and accountability in public finances. He has publicly emphasized the importance of fighting corruption regardless of political affiliation, promoting ethical conduct among public officers, and urging strong anti-Illicit Financial Flows measures for Zambia's economy.

Ahead of the 2026 general election, Mwambazi joined the United Party for National Development and was adopted as the party's candidate in Bwana Mkubwa. He was re-elected as the Bwana Mkubwa MP at the election on 13 August 2026.

== International engagement ==
In May 2025, Mwambazi led a parliamentary delegation to Morocco, where the Public Accounts Committee met with the First President of the Moroccan Court of Accounts to discuss mechanisms for oversight of public finances and best practices in audit institution independence.

== See also ==
- Bwana Mkubwa (constituency)
- National Assembly of Zambia
