= Chifubu (constituency) =

Constituency of the National Assembly of Zambia

Chifubu is a constituency of the National Assembly of Zambia. It covers the Chifubu, Kawama, Minsundu, Mitengo and Pamodzi neighbourhoods of Ndola in Ndola District of Copperbelt Province.

== List of MPs ==
Election year	MP	Party
1973	Credo Banda	United National Independence Party
1978	Newstead Zimba	United National Independence Party
1983	Godfrey Simasiku	United National Independence Party
1988	Arthur Mtewa	United National Independence Party
1991	Levy Mwanawasa	Movement for Multi-Party Democracy
1996	David Mulenga	Movement for Multi-Party Democracy
2001	Mathew Mulanda	Movement for Multi-Party Democracy
2006	Benson Bwalya	Patriotic Front
2010 (by-election)	Berina Kawandami	Patriotic Front
2011	Berina Kawandami	Patriotic Front
2016	Frank Ng'ambi	Patriotic Front
2021	Lloyd Lubozha	United Party for National Development
2026	Kondwani Winga	Independent
