= Ndola City Council =

Government body in Ndola, Zambia

Ndola City Council is a metropolitan city representative of the city of Ndola in Ndola District. It was formed in 1942 and serves as the sole service delivery supplier of the city of Ndola.

The council serves all residential areas in Ndola. However, it has been marred in corruption cases with residents claiming unfair allocation of city land.
