= Tug Argan Barracks =

Zambian military facility

Tug-Argan Barracks is a military station located in Ndola, Zambia. It is one of the six major military stations in Zambia.
