= Bwana Mkubwa (constituency) =

Constituency of the National Assembly of Zambia

Bwana Mkubwa is a constituency of the National Assembly of Zambia. It covers Bwana Mkubwa, Itawa/Ndeke, Kavu/Kan'gonga, Mushili, Munkulungwe and Twashuka/Kaloko in the Ndola District of Copperbelt Province.

== List of MPs ==
| Election year | MP | Party |
|---|---|---|
| 1983 | Cleaver Mukuka | United National Independence Party |
| 1988 | Lawrence Phiri | United National Independence Party |
| 1991 | Andrew Kashita | Movement for Multi-Party Democracy |
| 1996 | Mathew Mulanda | Movement for Multi-Party Democracy |
| 2001 | Paul Katema | Movement for Multi-Party Democracy |
| 2006 | Joseph Zulu | Patriotic Front |
| 2011 | Emmanuel Chenda | Patriotic Front |
| 2016 | Jonas Chanda | Patriotic Front |
| 2021 | Warren Mwambazi | Independent |
| 2026 | Warren Mwambazi | United Party for National Development |
