= Lobito Oil Refinery =

Oil refinery in Angola

- Location within Angola
- Location: Lobito, Benguela Province, Angola; 12°19′30″S 13°36′37″E

Refinery details
- Operator: Sonangol
- Owner: Sonangol
- Opened: 2027 (Expected)
- Capacity: 200,000 barrels per day (32,000 m^{3}/d)

The Lobito Oil Refinery (Portuguese: Refinaria do Lobito), is a crude oil refinery planned in Angola. When fully operationalized, the refinery is expected to process 200,000 barrels, equivalent to 32,000 cubic meters (32,000,000 L) of crude oil on a daily basis. The oil infrastructure facility is under development by Sonangol, the national oil company of Angola.

== Location ==
The oil refinery is located on a piece of real estate that measures 3,800 hectares (15 mi^{2}), approximately 8 kilometres (5 mi) north of the town of Lobito and about 35 kilometres (22 mi) north of the city of Benguela, in the Benguela Province of Angola, along the Atlantic Ocean coast.

== Background ==
As of October 2021, Angola was producing approximately 1,200,000 barrels of crude oil daily, with production capacity expected to increase as new fields come online. At the same time, the country spent over US$1.7 billion on oil products imports into the country annually.

The Angolan authorities plan to ramp up local refining capacity to 360,000 barrels daily in the short term. After meeting local demand, the refined oil products will be marketed to neighboring countries, with focus on the Democratic Republic of the Congo and Zambia. Feasibility studies to build a pipeline from this refinery to Zambia, the Lobito–Lusaka Oil Products Pipeline, are ongoing as of 2022.

== Ownership ==
The government of Angola is in search of a strategic investor to assume a controlling stake in the development project. As of July 2022, the ownership of Lobito Oil Refinery is as illustrated in the table below.

Lobito Oil Refinery Shareholding
Rank	Shareholder	Domicile	Percentage	Notes
1	Sonangol	Angola	30.0	
2	Strategic Investor(s)	TBD		
3	Government of Zambia	Zambia		
	Total		100.0	

== Construction ==
The tender for the engineering, procurement and construction (EPC) contractor yielded five international consortia, who will be winnowed down in further tendering stages.

== See also ==
- Uganda Oil Refinery
