= Indeni Petroleum Refinery =

Zambian oil refinery

- Location within Zambia
- Location: Ndola, Ndola District, Zambia; 13°02′21″S 28°40′48″E

Refinery details
- Operator: Indeni Petroleum Refinery Limited
- Owner: Government of Zambia
- Opened: 1973; 53 years ago
- Capacity: 24,000 barrels per day (3,800 m^{3}/d)
- Website: homepage

The Indeni Petroleum Refinery is an oil refinery in Zambia's industrial city of Ndola.

== Location ==
The refinery is located in Ndola, Ndola District, Copperbelt Province, approximately 8 kilometres (5 mi), by road, southeast of the city's central business district. The geographical coordinates of the refinery are:13°02'21.0"S, 28°40'48.0"E (Latitude:-13.039167; Longitude:28.680000).

== Overview ==
The petroleum refinery is described in some publications as a "very small and simple refinery". It was constructed in 1973, with capacity to refine 24,000 bbl/d of crude oil, and process 1,200,000 tonnes (1,322,774 tons) of feedstock annually. Crude oil is imported via the Kurasini Oil Jetty in Dar es Salaam, Tanzania and is delivered to the refinery through the 1,704 kilometres (1,059 mi) Tazama Pipeline. The annual delivery capacity of the pipeline is also the annual processing capacity of the refinery.

== Operations ==
The Indeni Refinery is configured as a Hydro-skimming refinery. Designed in 1973, the refinery is not able to refine pure crude at commercial levels and processes spiked crude.

The refinery is able to produce the following products: (a) unleaded petrol (b) automotive gas oil (c) industrial kerosene (d) domestic kerosene (e) Jet fuel (f) Liquefied Petroleum Gas (g) reformate (h) fuel oil and (i) asphalt.

== Ownership ==
When the refinery was established in 1973, it was owned and managed by Indeni Petroleum Refinery Company Limited, a 50/50 joint venture between the government of Zambia and Eni, the Italian energy conglomerate, through their subsidiary Agip Zambia. Under the terms of the joint venture, Eni was responsible for the management of the refinery. In 2001, Eni sold their shareholding to Total S.A., through their subsidiary TotalFinaElf. Total took over management of the refinery. In 2009, Total S.A. sold their shareholding to the Zambian government for consideration of US$5.5 million.

Since then, there have been attempts to bring on-board a strategic partner with funding and expertise to upgrade, modernize and expand the refinery.

== Modernization ==
In 2017, the World Bank stated that the Indeni Petroleum Refinery was "inefficient and technologically unsuited for current fuel needs". Its capacity is too small. It does not produce refinement products that larger, more efficient refineries can. For the amount of resources expended to keep it running, the government can do better towards meeting their national petroleum objectives.

In order to meet increasing petroleum products demand both nationally and regionally, there are two choices (a) build a new modern refinery that meets current and future national and regional needs or (b) expand and modernize the present refinery to improve its efficiency and output. Building a new refinery is ruled out by its cost. Rehabilitation, expansion and modernization has been estimated at about US$500 million. As the government considers its options, the capacity at the refinery has dropped to 21,000 bbl/day. The last hope is to find a deep-pocket investor who can buy a stake in the present refinery and modernize it.

== See also ==
- Tazama Pipeline
- TAZARA Railway
