= Jonas Chanda =

Zambian politician

Jonas Kamima Chanda

Minister of Health
- In office January 2021 – May 2021
- President: Edgar Lungu
- Preceded by: Chitalu Chilufya
- Succeeded by: Sylvia Masebo

Minister for Water Development, Sanitation and Environmental Protection
- In office September 2020 – January 2021
- President: Edgar Lungu
- Preceded by: Dennis Wachinga
- Succeeded by: Raphael Nakachinda

Member of the National Assembly for Bwana Mkubwa
- In office August 2016 – August 2021
- President: Edgar Lungu
- Preceded by: Emmanuel Chenda
- Succeeded by: Warren Mwambazi

Personal details
- Born: 22 December 1972 (age 53)
- Party: Patriotic Front
- Profession: Physician

Jonas Kamima Chanda (born 22 December 1972) is a Zambian politician. He served as Member of the National Assembly for Bwana Mkubwa from 2016 to 2021, Minister of Water Development, Sanitation and Environmental Protection from 2020 to 2021, and as Minister of Health in 2021.

== Biography ==
Chanda studied for a BSc in human biology and earnt an MBChB in medicine and surgery. Prior to entering politics he worked as a physician, leading public health schemes in Botswana, Nigeria, Rwanda, Swaziland and Zambia. In Swaziland he became Country Director for Southern Africa Human Capacity Development.

He joined the Patriotic Front in 2005 whilst working in Botswana, and was appointed Chairman of Finance for Overseas Branches in 2007. He applied to become a Patriotic Front candidate in the 2011 general elections, but was unsuccessful. However, after applying again, he was chosen as Patriotic Front candidate for Bwana Mkubwa for the 2016 general elections. He was subsequently elected to the National Assembly with an 11,700-vote majority. After becoming an MP, he joined the Committee on Health, Community Development and Social Services and the Standing Orders Committee. In September 2020 he was appointed Minister for Water Development, Sanitation and Environmental Protection. In January 2021, he was made Minister of Health. He lost his seat in the 2021 general elections.

Chanda is married to Sophie and has one child, Tasha.
