= Tazama Pipeline =

Crude oil pipeline

Coordinates: 13°02′26″S 28°40′48″E

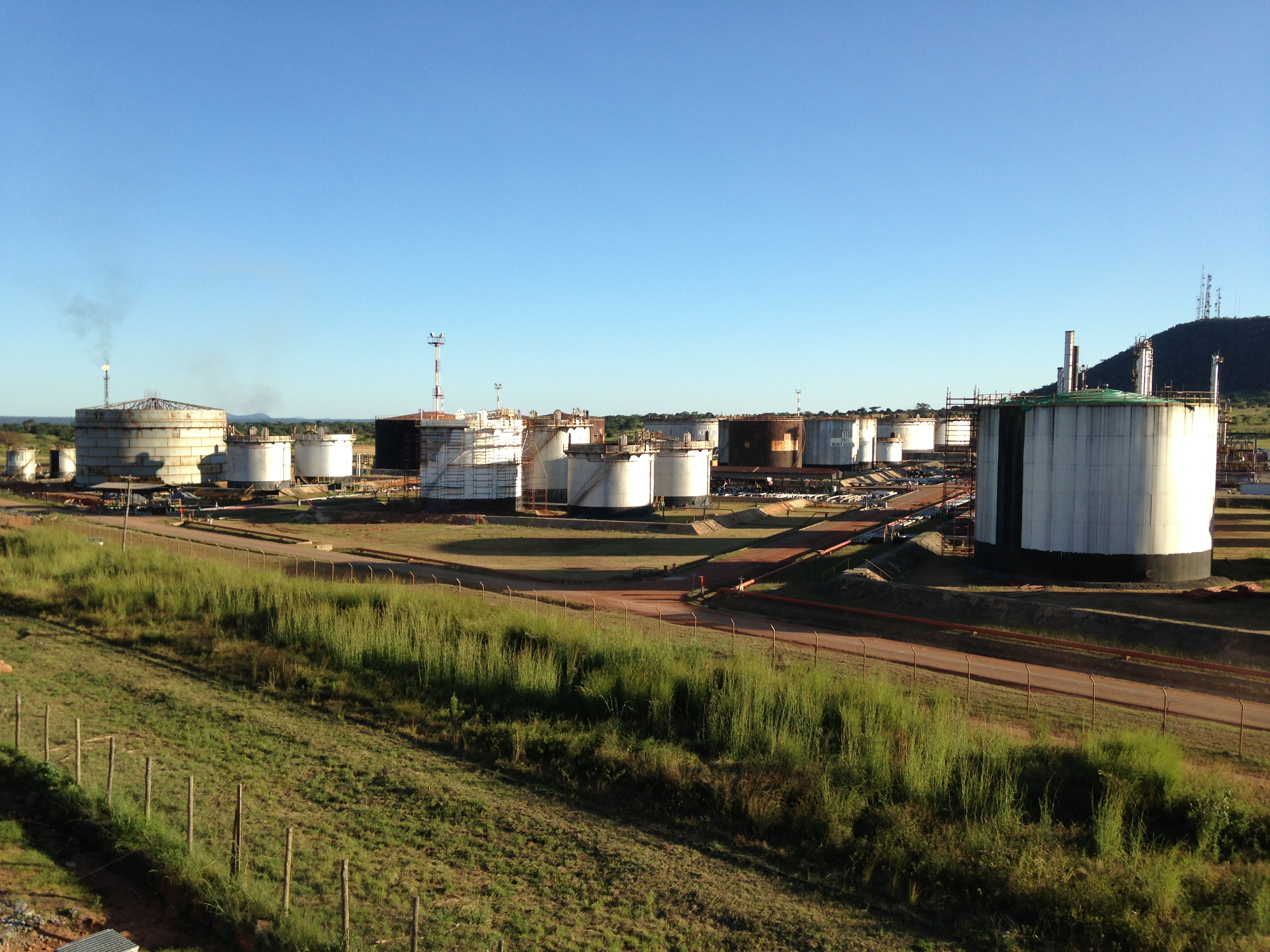
- Tazama Oil Depot

Location
- Country: Tanzania and Zambia
- Direction: East to West
- Start: Dar-es-Salaam, Tanzania
- To: Ndola, Zambia

General information
- Type: Crude oil
- Partners: Government of Tanzania and Government of Zambia
- Operator: Tazama Pipeline Limited
- Commissioned: 1968; 58 years ago

Technical information
- Length: 1,710 km (1,060 mi)
- Maximum discharge: 1,100,000 tonnes (1,212,542 tons) annually
- No. of pumping stations: 7

The Tazama Pipeline, also Tanzania–Zambia Crude Oil Pipeline, is a 1,710 kilometres (1,063 mi) long crude oil pipeline from the port of Dar-es-Salaam, Tanzania, to the Indeni Petroleum Refinery in Ndola, Zambia.

== Location ==
The Tazama pipeline extends from the Indian Ocean port of Dar es Salaam, in Tanzania to the industrial city of Ndola, Zambia, in the Copperbelt Province, close to the border with the Democratic Republic of the Congo. The pipeline travels approximately 1060 miles (1,710 kilometers). For 954 kilometres (593 mi) the pipeline has a diameter of 8 inches (200 mm), and for the remaining 798 kilometres (496 mi), the pipeline diameter is 12 inches (300 mm). According to the map at the pipeline website, the pipeline passes through or near the following cities and towns: Dar es Salaam, Morogoro, Epass, Iringa, Mbeya, Chinsali, Mpika, Kalonje and Ndola.

== Overview ==
The Tazama Crude Oil Pipeline was constructed to transport crude oil from the port of Dar-es-Salaam into landlocked Zambia, at an affordable, sustainable economic cost. When installed in 1968, the pipeline had a carrying capacity of 1,100,000 tonnes (1,212,542 tons) annually. By 2002, carrying capacity had deteriorated to 600,000 tonnes (661,387 tons) annually.

Associated infrastructure owned by Tazama in Tanzania, includes the tank farm in Dar es Salaam consisting of six storage tanks onshore, which comprise three tanks of 36,000 cubic meters (36,000,000 L) capacity combined and three tanks of combined capacity of 41,000 cubic meters (41,000,000 L). There are seven pump stations in total between Dar-es-Salaam and Ndola; five stations in Tanzania and two in Zambia.

== Ownership ==
The pipeline is owned and operated by a company called Tazama Pipelines Limited, with headquarters in Ndola Zambia and an office in Dar es Salaam, Tanzania. TAZAMA stands for Tanzania Zambia Mafuta. "Mafuta" means "Oil" in Kiswahili. The table below illustrates the shareholding in the shares of stock of Tazama Pipelines Limited.

Shareholding in the stock of Tazama Pipelines Limited
Rank	Name of owner	Percentage ownership
1	Government of Zambia	66.70
2	Government of Tanzania	33.30

== Operation ==
Due to age and lack of regular maintenance, the Tazama pipeline suffers corrosion and develops leaks from time to time. Repair of those leaks is necessary to avoid environmental degradation.

Due to inability by Tazama Pipeline and Indeni Petroleum Refinery to supply all the refined petroleum products that Zambia requires, in the desired quantities, the government of Zambia and that of Tanzania, are contemplating building a 1,349 kilometres (838 mi) refined petroleum products pipeline at an estimated cost of US$1.5 billion. No timeframe has been given.
