= Ndola District =

District in Zambia's Copperbelt Province

- District
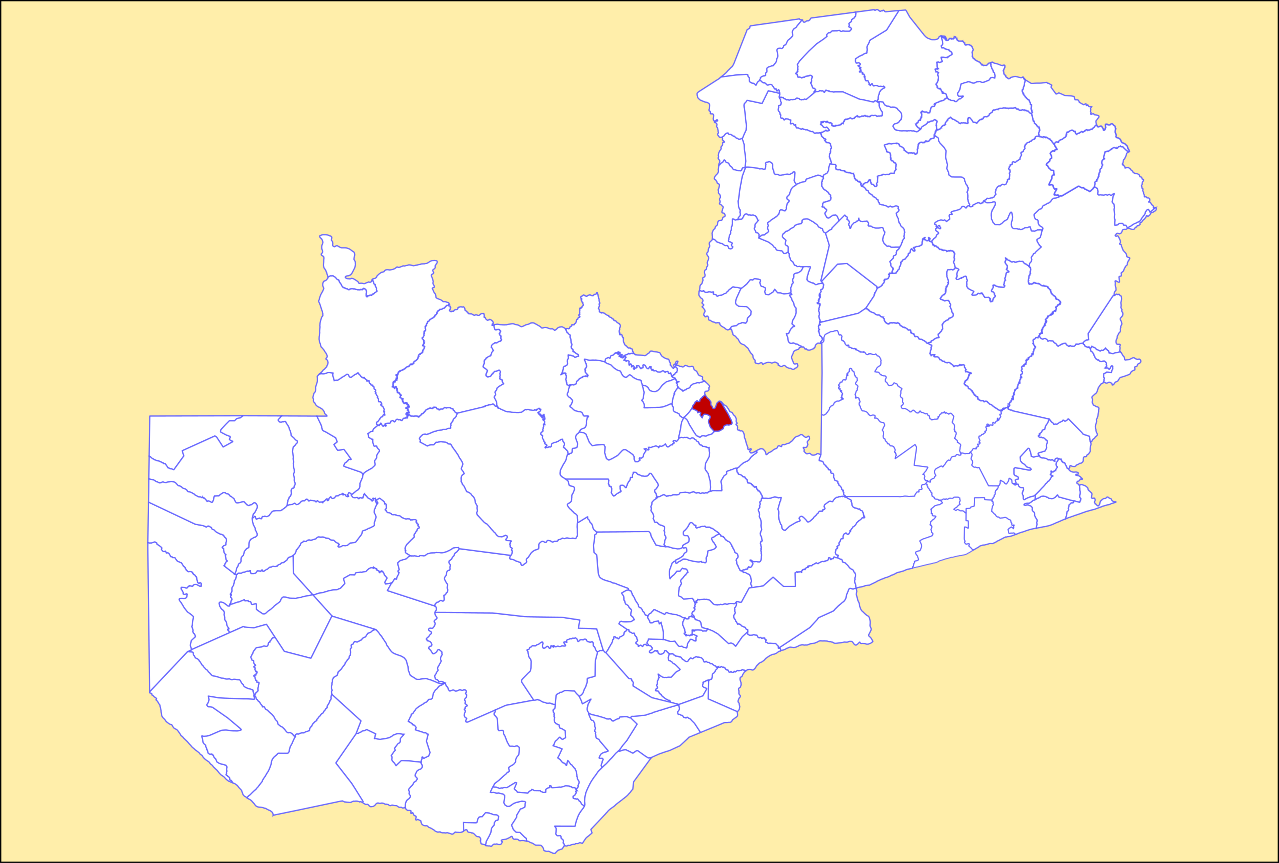
- District location in Zambia

- Location within Zambia
- Coordinates: 12°50′S 28°35′E
- Country: Zambia
- Province: Copperbelt Province
- Capital: Ndola

Area
  - Total: 958.6 km^{2} (370.1 sq mi)

Population (2022)
  - Total: 624,579
  - Density: 651.6/km^{2} (1,688/sq mi)
- Time zone: UTC+2 (CAT)

Ndola District is an administrative district in the Copperbelt Province of Zambia, centred on the city of Ndola, which serves as both the district and provincial capital. Located approximately 320 kilometres north of Lusaka, Ndola is one of Zambia’s principal industrial and commercial centres and a gateway to the Copperbelt mining region.

As of the 2022 census, the district had a population of 624,579, making it one of the most densely populated districts in the province.

== Geography ==
=== Location and borders ===
Ndola District is located in north-central Zambia within the Copperbelt region. It lies approximately at 12°50′S 28°35′E and forms part of a continuous urban-industrial corridor. The district shares boundaries with Kitwe District to the north-west, Mufulira District to the north, Masaiti District to the south and Luanshya District to the southwest, and lies close to the international boundary with the Democratic Republic of the Congo to the north.

=== Topography ===
The district lies on the Central African Plateau at elevations ranging from 1,250 to 1,455 metres above sea level. Ndola lies within the Kafue River basin. The Kafubu River is the principal watercourse, passing through the city and supporting municipal water supply systems. Other streams include the Ndola, Mushili, Kansenshi, and Itawa streams.

=== Climate ===
Ndola experiences a subtropical highland climate with wet and dry seasonal patterns. The wet season extends from November to April and accounts for most annual rainfall. The dry season runs from May to October. Annual rainfall ranges between 1,200 and 1,400 millimetres.

Average temperatures range between 15°C and 30°C, moderated by altitude. Occasional droughts occur during regional climate variability events.

== History ==
=== Pre-colonial period ===
Before colonial rule, the Ndola area was inhabited primarily by the Lamba people, organised in small chiefdoms. Their economy consisted of agriculture, hunting, ironworking, and participation in regional trade networks linked to the Lunda and Luba systems. During the nineteenth century, the region experienced disruption from slave raiding and competition among Swahili-Arab traders, Chokwe groups, and neighbouring Bemba and Ngoni polities. Many settlements were temporary or defensive in nature.

=== Colonial foundation ===
Modern Ndola was established in 1904 when the British South Africa Company created an administrative post under John Edward Stephenson. The settlement was strategically located to support early copper mining operations, including the Bwana Mkubwa deposit. Between 1906 and 1909, the construction of the railway connecting Broken Hill to the Copperbelt transformed Ndola into a transport and logistics hub linking the region to Livingstone and the Congo. By the 1920s and 1930s, Ndola had developed into a major industrial and administrative centre supporting copper production across the Copperbelt.

=== Industrial expansion ===
During the mid twentieth century, Ndola grew rapidly due to copper mining, refining, and manufacturing industries. It became a key export and administrative centre in Northern Rhodesia. Following independence in 1964, Ndola was integrated into Zambia’s national industrial economy as part of the Copperbelt development zone.

=== Post-independence developments ===
In the 1970s, the mining sector was nationalised under Zambia Consolidated Copper Mines. Ndola expanded as part of a state-supported industrial economy. Economic decline in the 1980s and 1990s led to privatisation reforms and industrial restructuring. From the 2000s onward, the district diversified into manufacturing, logistics, and services while maintaining its role in the copper supply chain.

== Economy ==
=== Mining ===
Ndola is historically linked to Zambia’s copper industry, although large-scale extraction occurs in neighbouring districts. The district remains important for refining, logistics, and industrial support services. Copper continues to dominate Zambia’s export economy and remains the backbone of national foreign exchange earnings.

=== Manufacturing and trade ===
Ndola is one of Zambia’s leading industrial centres. Key sectors include cement and lime production, metal fabrication, food processing, and chemical industries. The district functions as a major commercial hub linking Zambia with the Democratic Republic of the Congo and wider southern African markets.

Transport infrastructure includes the T3 highway, railway networks, and Simon Mwansa Kapwepwe International Airport.

== Demographics ==
=== Population ===
The population is predominantly urban, with high density and ongoing peri-urban expansion.

=== Ethnic groups and languages ===
The indigenous Lamba people form the original population base. However, the largest ethnic group is the Bemba, due to migration linked to mining employment. Other minor groups include Chewa, Ngoni, Tonga, Tumbuka and smaller communities from the Democratic Republic of Congo.

Bemba is the dominant lingua franca of the district, whereas English serves as the official language. Other local languages include Lamba which is widely used, especially in rural areas.

== Government and administration ==
Ndola District operates under a dual administrative system consisting of a District Commissioner representing central government and the Ndola City Council as the local authority. The district is divided into five constituencies: Bwana Mkubwa, Chifubu, Dag Hammarskjöld, Kabushi, and Ndola Central. It also contains 30 administrative wards, which serve as the lowest level of local governance.

== See also ==
- Copperbelt Province
- Ndola
- Mining in Zambia
