= Ndola =

- City
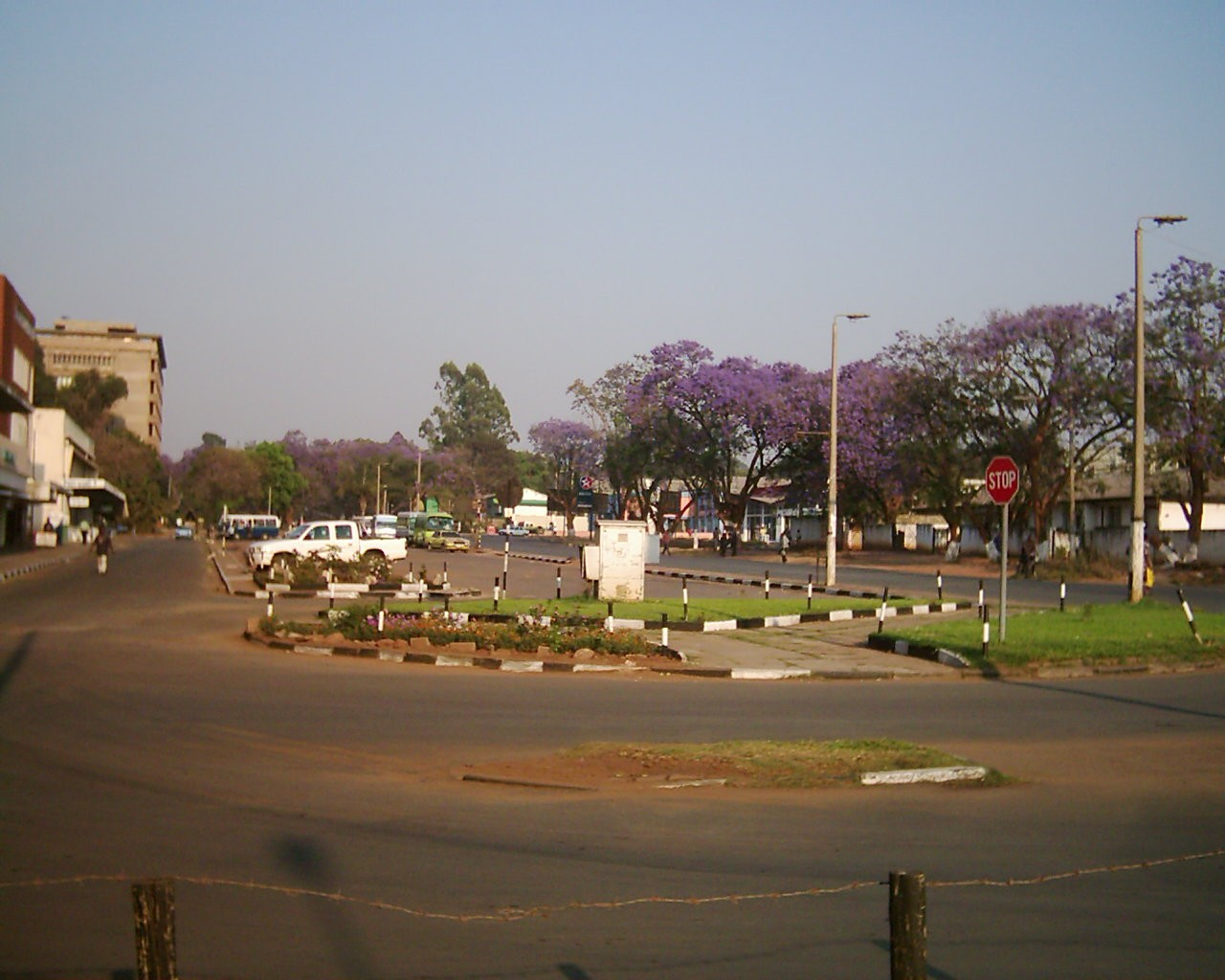
- Downtown Ndola
- Nickname: NoliNoli
- Location in Zambia Ndola (Africa)
- Coordinates: 12°58′08″S 28°37′57″E
- Country: Zambia
- Province: Copperbelt Province
- District: Ndola District
- Inception: 1904

Government
  - Mayor: Samuel Munthali
- Elevation: 1,300 m (4,300 ft)

Population (2022)
  - Total: 624,579
- Demonym: Zimandola
- Time zone: UTC+2 (CAT)
- Climate: Cwa
- Website: www.cityofndola.gov.zm

Ndola is the third largest city in Zambia in terms of size and population, with a population of 624,579 (2022 census),. after the capital, Lusaka, and Kitwe, and the second largest in terms of infrastructure development after Lusaka. It is the industrial and commercial center of the Copperbelt, Zambia's copper-mining region, and capital of Copperbelt Province. It lies just 10 kilometres (6.2 mi) from the border with DR Congo. It is also home to Zambia's first modern stadium, the Levy Mwanawasa Stadium.

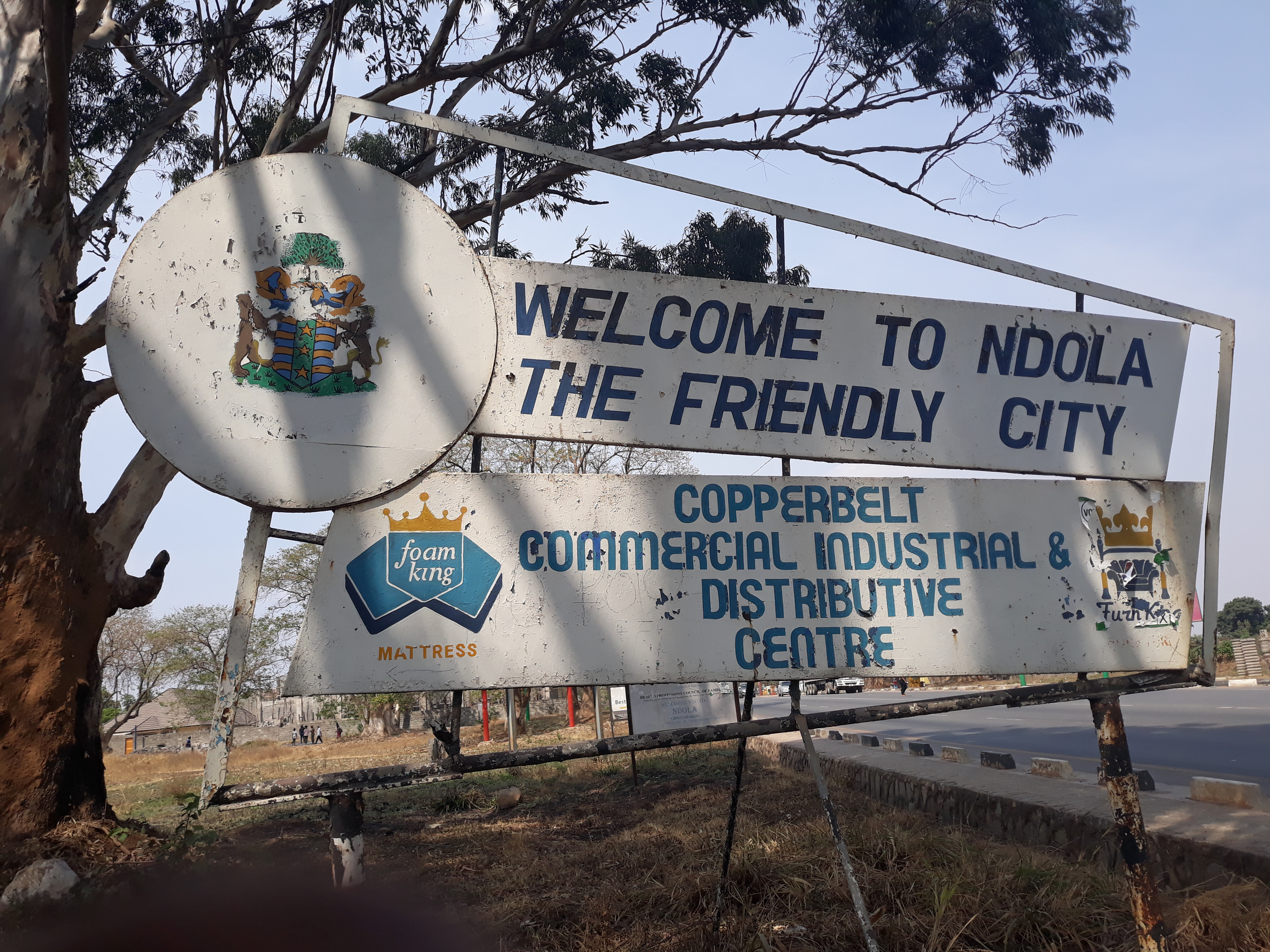
A sign on the T3 road depicting Ndola as The Friendly City

== History ==
What is now Ndola was first inhabited by the Lamba people led by Senior Chief Chiwala, the Lamba people migrated from the Luba-Lunda kingdom around 1600 and the town of Ndola was under Chief Mushili for some time but now it is under Chief Chiwala who came to the Lambaland during the slave trade from Malawi. The name Ndola is derived from the river, which originates in the Kaloko Hills and drains in the Kafubu River.

The town of Ndola was founded in 1904 by John Edward "Chiripula" Stephenson. It was started as a boma and trading post, which laid its foundations as an administrative and trading centre today.

The Rhodesia Railways main line reached the town in 1907, providing passenger services as far south as Bulawayo, with connections to Cape Town. The line was extended into DR Congo and from there eventually linked to the Benguela Railway to the Atlantic port of Lobito (which took some of Zambia's copper exports for many years with recent interruptions by closures; the rail line is now back in service). The Ndola railhead was responsible for the town becoming the country's center of distribution. Before the road network was built up in the 1930s, a track from Ndola to Kapalala on the Luapula River, and boat transport from there to the Chambeshi River was the principal trade route for the Northern Province, which consequently formed part of Ndola's hinterland.

In 1960, Lilian Burton, a white settler, was killed near Ndola by a UNIP-affiliated mob. In 1961, an airplane carrying key United Nations figures, including the organisation's second Secretary General Dag Hammarskjöld, crashed on the outskirts of Ndola.

== Climate ==
Ndola has a moderate humid subtropical climate (Köppen Cwa).

Climate data for Ndola (1991–2020, extremes 1961–present)
Month	Jan	Feb	Mar	Apr	May	Jun	Jul	Aug	Sep	Oct	Nov	Dec	Year
Record high °C (°F)	34.2 (93.6)	33.1 (91.6)	32.0 (89.6)	32.4 (90.3)	32.0 (89.6)	30.7 (87.3)	31.1 (88.0)	34.1 (93.4)	39.6 (103.3)	37.4 (99.3)	38.5 (101.3)	34.5 (94.1)	39.6 (103.3)
Mean daily maximum °C (°F)	27.6 (81.7)	27.8 (82.0)	28.3 (82.9)	28.3 (82.9)	27.7 (81.9)	26.1 (79.0)	25.8 (78.4)	28.6 (83.5)	31.6 (88.9)	32.7 (90.9)	30.7 (87.3)	28.3 (82.9)	28.6 (83.5)
Daily mean °C (°F)	22.5 (72.5)	22.5 (72.5)	22.3 (72.1)	20.8 (69.4)	18.4 (65.1)	16.4 (61.5)	16.0 (60.8)	18.8 (65.8)	22.2 (72.0)	24.5 (76.1)	24.1 (75.4)	22.9 (73.2)	20.9 (69.6)
Mean daily minimum °C (°F)	17.3 (63.1)	17.1 (62.8)	16.3 (61.3)	13.2 (55.8)	9.1 (48.4)	6.6 (43.9)	6.1 (43.0)	8.9 (48.0)	12.8 (55.0)	16.2 (61.2)	17.5 (63.5)	17.5 (63.5)	13.2 (55.8)
Record low °C (°F)	11.0 (51.8)	10.6 (51.1)	7.5 (45.5)	6.2 (43.2)	0.5 (32.9)	−0.9 (30.4)	0.2 (32.4)	0.8 (33.4)	4.0 (39.2)	6.5 (43.7)	10.2 (50.4)	11.2 (52.2)	−0.9 (30.4)
Average precipitation mm (inches)	301.4 (11.87)	236.0 (9.29)	169.6 (6.68)	26.0 (1.02)	3.3 (0.13)	0.1 (0.00)	0.3 (0.01)	0.0 (0.0)	1.6 (0.06)	18.5 (0.73)	107.8 (4.24)	262.9 (10.35)	1,127.5 (44.39)
Average relative humidity (%)	82.5	83.0	79.7	73.4	65.9	61.1	54.6	46.6	40.9	47.3	64.9	80.4	65.0
Mean monthly sunshine hours	151.9	142.8	192.2	243.0	279.0	276.0	297.6	297.6	279.0	269.7	207.0	158.1	2,793.9
Source: NOAA (humidity and sun 1961–1990)

== Demography ==
Census	Population
1990	329,228
2000	374,757
2010	451,246
2022	627,503

== Industry ==
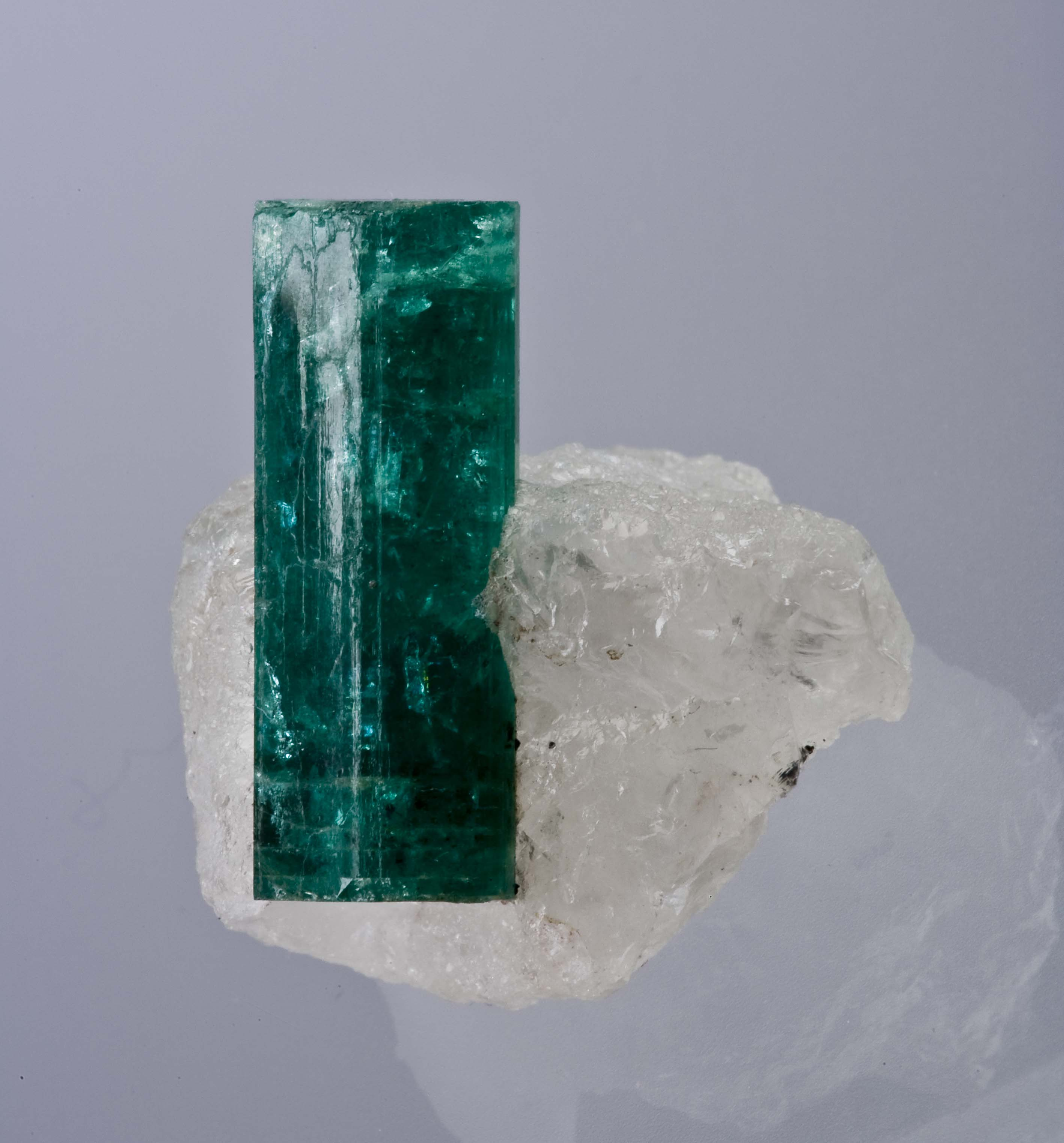
Emerald from the Kagem Emerald Mine, Kafubu Emerald District, Ndola. Size 3.0 x 2.7 x 2.6 cm.

=== Legacy ===
Once the largest industrial centre of Zambia, boasting, among many high-powered sites, company facilities including a Land Rover vehicle assembly plant, Dunlop Tire manufacture, Johnson & Johnson, and Unilever, Ndola's economy shrank significantly between 1980 and 2000. Many closed factories and plants lie unoccupied in the town. A number of former industries such as clothing and vehicle assembly have disappeared completely. Even though the term 'ghost town' can no longer apply to it, Ndola is yet to regain its economic glory of pre-1980 days.

=== Refining ===
There are no mines in Ndola itself, but the Bwana Mkubwa open-cast mine is only 10 km south-east of the city centre. Until their closure, copper and precious metals used to be brought from elsewhere in the Copperbelt for processing at the Ndola Copper Refinery and Precious Metals Refinery. Copper exports provide 70–80% of Zambia's export earnings, making the city very important to the country's economy.

The Indeni Oil Refinery in Ndola supplies the whole country with refined petroleum. It was repaired in 2001 after being severely damaged by fire in 1999. GL Africa Energy, through its subsidiary Ndola Energy Company Limited, provides 105MW of power to the National Grid of Zambia. Power is generated from heavy fuel oil supplied by the Indeni Petroleum refinery.

=== Commercial ===
Ndola is home to one of the country's national newspapers, the Times of Zambia, as well as its printer, Printpak. These run as one company called TimesPrintpak. Catholic Church-run printing press, Mission Press, is also located in Ndola, and operates as a commercial entity.

=== Limestone ===
Ndola has huge limestone reserves which are believed to be among the most homogeneous of their kind in the world. Limestone has therefore become to Ndola's economy what copper is to the rest of the country, providing much of the wealth and employment. Lime is a major component in the production of cement; a cement plant getting its lime from limestone and manufacturing a limestone cement will consume well over 80 kg limestone per 100 kg of cement produced.

Between 1974 and 2009, Ndola supplied over 50% of Zambia's cement from a plant located some 5 km south-east of the heart of the city. This plant was called Chilanga Cement, Ndola Works. The parent company then was Chilanga Cement plc. Chilanga Cement ran two plants in Zambia: one built in 1949 at Chilanga (hence the parent company name) and the other built in 1969 at Ndola. In 2008, the new holding company, Lafarge Cement Zambia, completed construction of a brand new plant at Chilanga which would produce about double the volume of Ndola Works. By mid-2009, the new plant was still gathering momentum toward full production capacity, leaving Ndola still a significant player in the region's cement industry. Nonetheless, the combination of huge limestone deposits and existing transport infrastructure passing through Ndola has kept the city a very attractive destination for investment into cement production and related activities.

A second cement works was under construction in 2008. In June 2009, countrywide advertisements were published to finalise staffing for this new cement plant.

Another important processing plant that is based on limestone in the area is Ndola Lime. It is Zambia's sole producer of lime. Ndola Lime is located near the two cement manufacturing facilities. It supplies the mining industry as well as farmers who require agricultural lime. Ndola Lime company is wholly owned by ZCCM Investment Holdings, a parastatal holdings company via which Zambia's government maintains its active interest in the country's mining and closely related heavy industry.

=== Cultural interactions ===
The four processing plants (the cement plants, the lime plant and Bwana Mkubwa) have mining rights on land located very close to the traditional Chiefdom of Chiwala. Chief Chiwala is therefore a significant interested party to Ndola industry and economics.

=== Electrical engineering ===
Egyptian company Elsewedy Electric joined a consortium of local companies led by ZESCO Ltd (Zambia's electricity supply authority), and established a transformer manufacturing plant and an electrical meter manufacturing plant in Zambia in 2008. Both these facilities are located about 5 km south of Ndola city centre.

== Transport ==
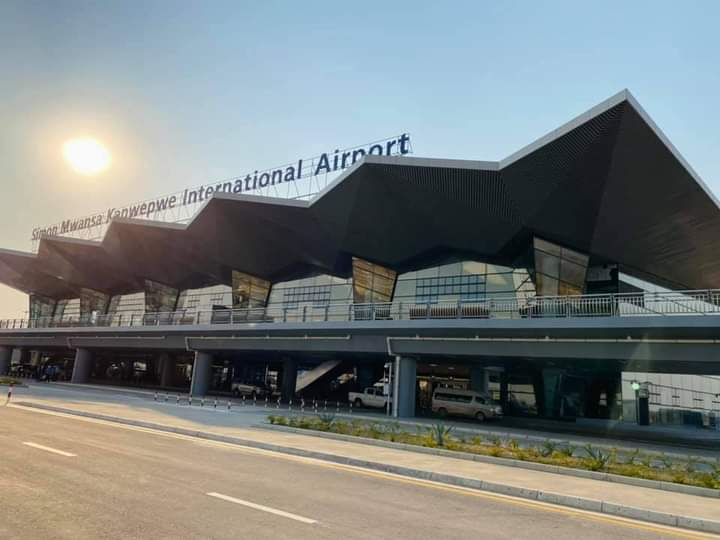
Simon Mwansa Kapwepwe International Airport

The city is served by the operating sections of the Cape to Cairo Railway. The railway operator Zambia Railways maintains a railway station in Ndola, with passenger and freight services to the city of Kitwe to the north-west and the cities of Kabwe, Lusaka and Livingstone to the south. Freight rail lines run to other Copperbelt towns and from Ndola to Lubumbashi in DR Congo via Sakania.

Ndola is on the T3 road, which connects to Kitwe in the north-west (as a dual carriageway) and to Kapiri Mposhi and Lusaka in the south. The M4 road connects Ndola to Mufulira (and the Congo Pedicle) in the north.

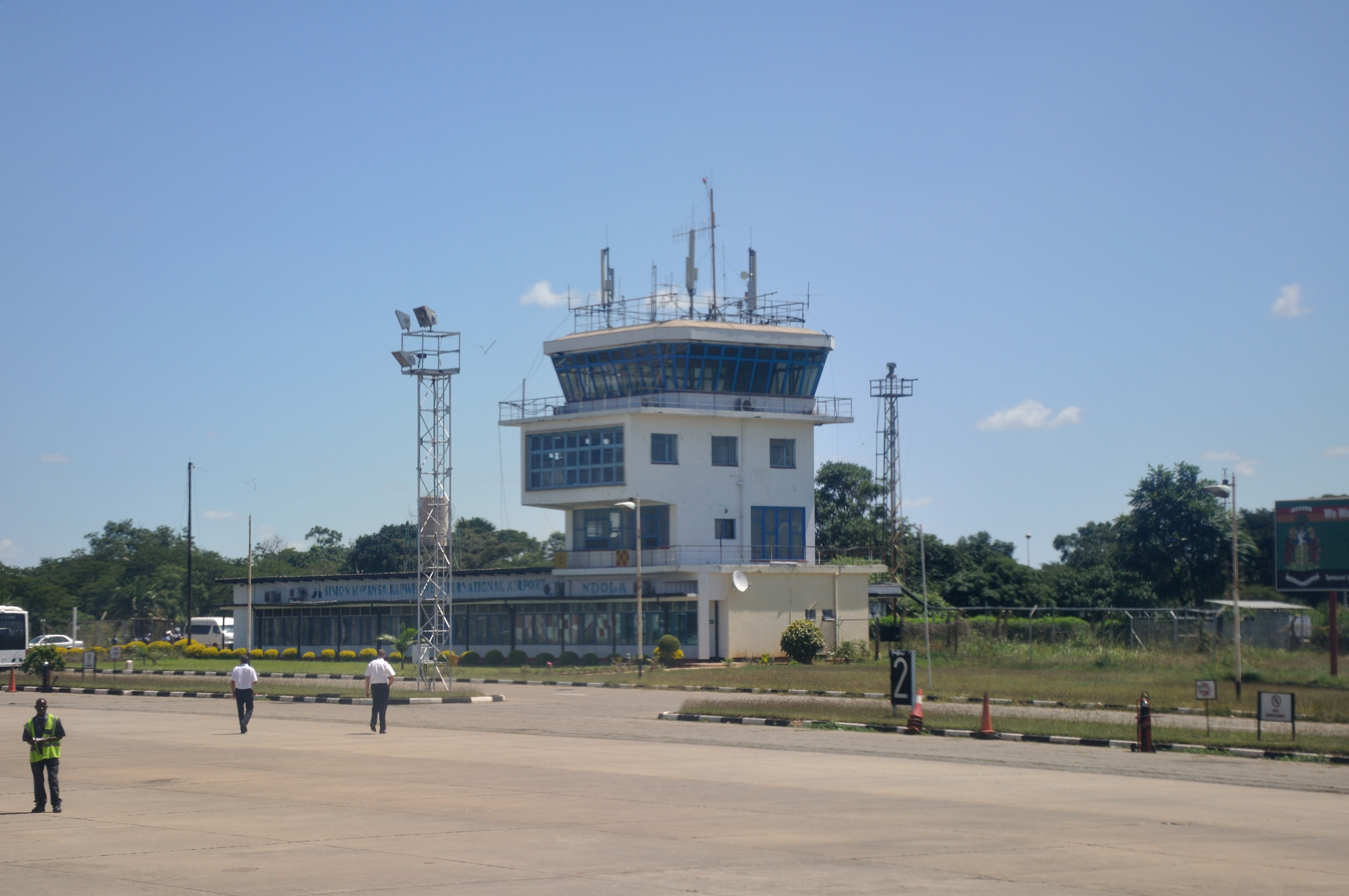
Peter Zuze Air Force Base, former premises of Simon Mwansa Kapwepwe International Airport

Simon Mwansa Kapwepwe International Airport, located 15 km west of the city centre (adjacent to the Dag Hammarskjöld Crash Site Memorial), has scheduled domestic services to Lusaka and Mansa and international services to Addis Ababa, Dar es Salaam, Maun, Johannesburg and Nairobi. It is one of the country's four international airports, others being Livingstone, Lusaka and Mfuwe.

The Tazama Pipeline from Dar es Salaam terminates at the Indeni Petroleum Refinery in the town.

== Sport and recreation ==
As with many towns on the Copperbelt, Ndola's sports and recreation life was heavily supported by the now disbundled mining conglomerate, Zambia Consolidated Copper Mines Ltd (ZCCM). With the demise of ZCCM, many facilities deteriorated fast. Nevertheless, significant sports places are Ndola Tennis Club (membership), Ndola Swimming Pool (public), the Kanini area (about 3 km from city centre and home to several sports clubs and playing fields like Ndola Wanderers Football Club, a rugby club, and others). About 10 km north-west of the city centre, there is a motor racing track popular with weekend motorbike enthusiasts. The city has several recreational green parks which enjoy a very basic level of maintenance and are open to the public. Of particular significance is the Dag Hammarskjöld Crash Site Memorial located some 10 km west-north-west of Ndola city centre. Dag Hammarskjöld Stadium, which was located on the banks of the Kafubu River south of the city, was razed in the 1980s. Its replacement, in the north-west of the city, is the Levy Mwanawasa Stadium with a seating capacity of 50,000. Ndola is home to Zesco United, a top-flight team in the Zambia Premier League. Zesco FC is nicknamed "team ya ziko", or the national team in the Nyanja language.

== Neighbourhoods ==
- Bwana Mkubwa
- Chifubu
- Chipulukusu
- Dola Hill
- Hillcrest
- Itawa
- Kabushi
- Kaloko
- Kanini
- Kansenshi
- Kawama
- Lubuto
- Masala
- Minsundu
- Mitengo
- Mushili
- Ndeke
- Northrise
- Nkwazi
- Pamodzi
- Twapia

== Education ==
The Northrise University was founded in 2003.

The following are some of the education institutions found in Ndola:

- Chifubu High School
- Copperbelt Nursing Polytechnic
- The Copperbelt University School of Medicine
- Itawa Basic School
- Kansenshi Basic School
- Kansenshi Secondary School
- Lubuto Secondary School
- Masala Secondary School
- Ndola College of Biomedical Sciences
- Ndola Primary
- Ndola Technical School
- Northern Technical College
- National Institute of Public Administration (NIPA), Ndola campus
- Northrise Primary School
- St. Andrews High School
- Temweni High School

== Culture ==
The Copperbelt Museum, with a collection of gems and minerals from the Copperbelt.

Small reservoirs formed by dams on the Kafubu and Itawa streams flowing through the south-east of the city are used for boating and recreation.

The thermal power station which dominates the skyline near the railway station, built to power the mines and refineries, ceased operation in the 1960s when the Kariba Dam power station came on line.

=== National monuments ===
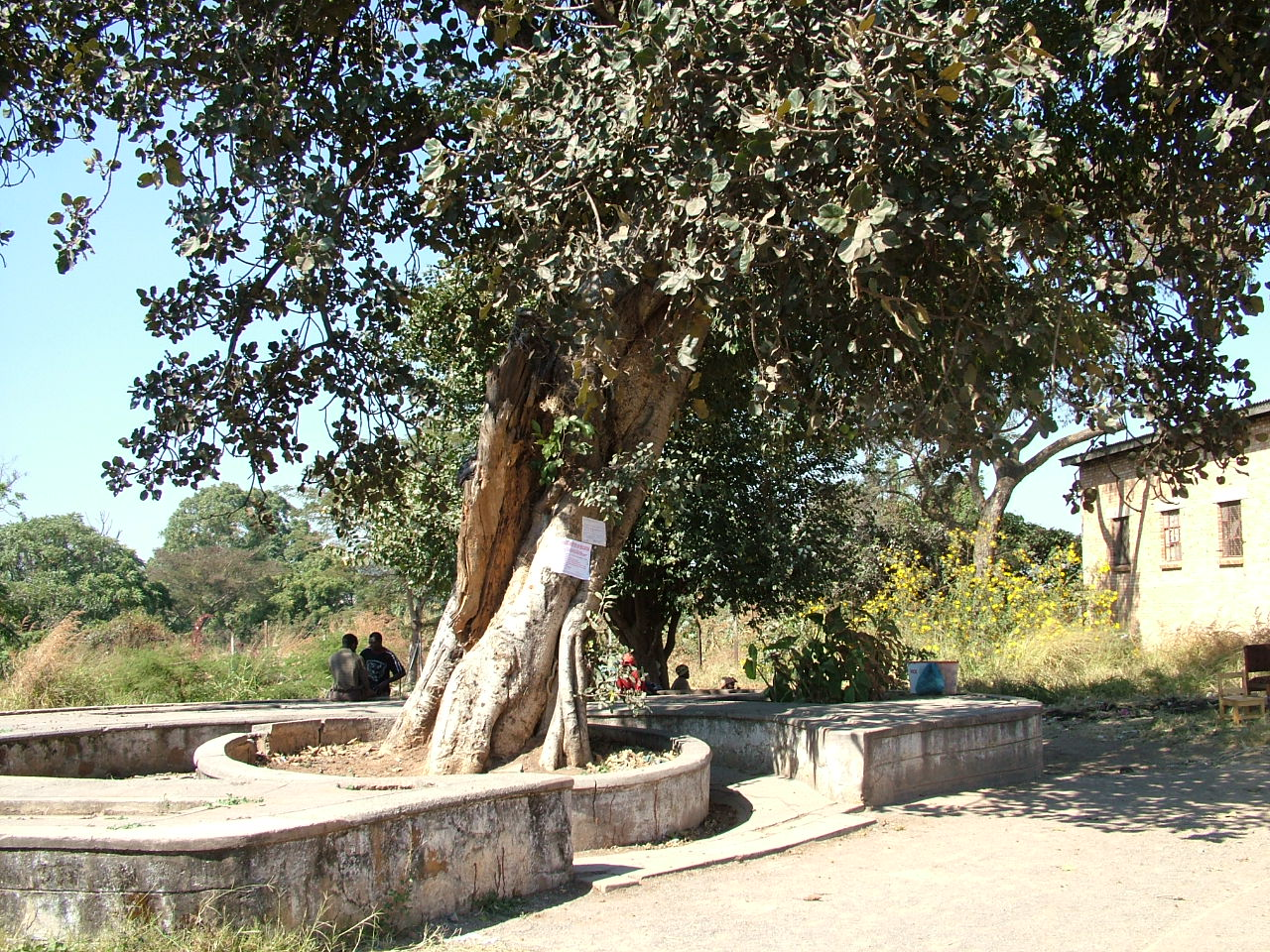
The Mukuyu Slave Tree in Ndola

- The Slave Tree or Mukuyu Slave Tree, around which Arab slave traders held slave markets in the nineteenth century (a mukuyu tree is a kind of fig tree). It has fallen due to termites.
- Dag Hammarskjöld Memorial ten kilometres west of the city centre, off the Ndola/Kitwe road, commemorates the site where the then United Nations Secretary-General, Dag Hammarskjöld died in a plane crash on September 18, 1961 during the Congo Crisis.
- Lake Chilengwa 14 km E of Ndola at 12°58' S 28°45' E, was formed by the collapse of rock into an underlying limestone cavern, and has local cultural significance.

== Places of worship ==
Among the places of worship are predominantly Christian churches and temples: Roman Catholic Diocese of Ndola (Catholic Church), United Church in Zambia (World Communion of Reformed Churches), Reformed Church in Zambia (World Communion of Reformed Churches), Baptist Fellowship of Zambia (Baptist World Alliance), Assemblies of God. There are also Muslim mosques.

== Sister cities ==
- Aldershot, England, United Kingdom
- Blantyre, Malawi
- Bentol, Liberia
- Porto, Portugal
- Regina, Saskatchewan, Canada
- Makhachkala, Russia
- Harbin, Heilongjiang, China
- Lubumbashi, Democratic Republic of the Congo
- Walvis Bay, Namibia

== Notable people ==
- Alan Kabanshi - engineer and researcher
- Edgar Lungu - politician
- Philip Sabu (1937–2008) - footballer
- Sampa the Great - rapper
- Wilbur Smith - novelist

== See also ==
- Railway stations in Zambia
- Copperbelt Province
- Tug Agan Barracks
