= Mafinga (disambiguation) =

Mafinga is a district in Tanzania. Mafinga might also refer to:

- Mafinga District, a district in Zambia
- Mafinga (constituency), a former Zambian parliamentary constituency of Mafinga District
- Mafinga North, a Zambian parliamentary constituency of Mafinga District
- Mafinga South (constituency), a Zambian parliamentary constituency of Mafinga District
- Mafinga Hills, a set of hills on the Zambia-Malawi border
  - Mafinga Central
