= M14 road (Zambia) =

Road in the Muchinga Province of Zambia

M14 Road

Major junctions
- North end: T2 (Great North Road) in Nakonde
- South end: Katumbi border with Malawi

Location
- Country: Zambia
- Provinces: Muchinga
- Major cities: Nakonde, Thendere, Muyombe

Highway system
- Transport in Zambia
← M13	→ M15

The M14 is a road in the Muchinga Province of Zambia that connects Nakonde with the Malawian Border at Katumbi via Chitipa, Thendere and Muyombe.

It is made up of two disjoint segments (the first section is from Nakonde to the Chitipa Border with Malawi and the second section is from the Border with Malawi south of Chisenga (near Mafinga Central), through Thendere and Muyombe, to the Border with Malawi at Katumbi).

== Route ==
The M14 is made up of two disjoint segments.

=== First Section ===
The M14 begins in Nakonde, (just north-east of the town centre and just south-west of the Tunduma Border with Tanzania) at a junction with the T2 road (Great North Road; Tanzam Highway). It heads south-east for 85 kilometres, through the eastern part of Isoka District, to the Chitipa Border with Malawi, where it becomes the M9 road of Malawi and passes through the town of Chitipa on the other side. This marks the end of the first section.

=== Second Section ===
The second section begins at a border with Malawi approximately 15 kilometres south of the Malawian town of Chisenga (in the Chitipa District), near the Mafinga Central peak in the Mafinga Hills (south-east of the Luangwa River source). It heads southwards through Mafinga District for 100 kilometres, through the towns of Thendere (headquarters of Mafinga District; where it meets the D790 coming from Isoka) and Muyombe, to the Katumbi Border with Malawi (south-west of the Nyika National Park), with the town of Katumbi on the other side. This marks the end of the second section.

The in-between road connecting Chitipa (near the end of the first section) with Chisenga (near the beginning of the second section) forms part of Malawi's M9 road.

== See also ==
- Roads in Zambia
