= Robert Chabinga =

Zambia politician (born 1981)

Leader of the Opposition in the National Assembly of Zambia
- In office 1 November 2023 – 15 May 2026
- Preceded by: Brian Mundubile

Member of the National Assembly of Zambia for Mafinga
- In office 12 August 2021 – 15 May 2026
- Preceded by: Jacob Siwale

Personal details
- Born: 1 January 1981 (age 45)
- Party: Patriotic Front

Robert M. Chabinga (born 1 January 1981) is a Zambian politician from the Patriotic Front (PF). He was the Leader of the Opposition in the National Assembly of Zambia from November 2023 to May 2026.

== Political career ==
Chabinga stood as the Patriotic Front candidate for parliament in Mafinga constituency at the 2021 general election and he was elected. In 2023, he was appointed Leader of the Opposition by the Patriotic Front administration. In 2024, he was recognized as the Distinctive Visionary Leader of the Year at the Global Leadership Forum.

Ahead of the 2026 general election, Mafinga constituency was split into Mafinga North and Mafinga South and Chabinga selected Mafinga South as the constituency to contest in. He was the United Party for National Development candidate in Mafinga South at the 2026 general election in August 2026 and Faith Munthali of the Citizens First party won the parliamentary seat ahead of him.

== See also ==
- List of members of the National Assembly of Zambia (2021–2026)
