= Geography of Zambia =

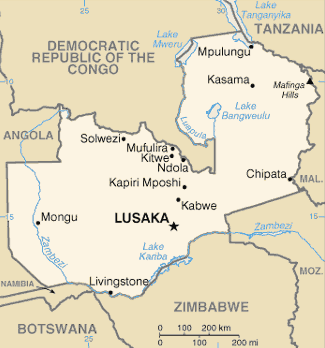
- Continent: Africa
- Region: Southern Africa
- Coordinates: 15°S 30°E
- Area: Ranked 38th
  - Total: 752,618 km^{2} (290,587 sq mi)
- Coastline: 0 km (0 mi)
- Borders: 5,664 km (Angola 1110 km, DROC 1930 km, Malawi 837 km, Mozambique 419 km, Namibia 233 km, Tanzania 338 km, Zimbabwe 797 km, Botswana <1 km)
- Highest point: Mafinga Central, Mafinga Hills; 2,339 m
- Lowest point: Zambezi River, 329 m
- Longest river: Zambezi River; 2,650 km
- Natural resources: copper, gold, lead

Zambia is a landlocked country located in Southern Africa, to the east of Angola. It has a total area of 752,618 square kilometres (slightly smaller than Turkey), of which 9,220 km^{2} is water.

== Area and boundaries ==
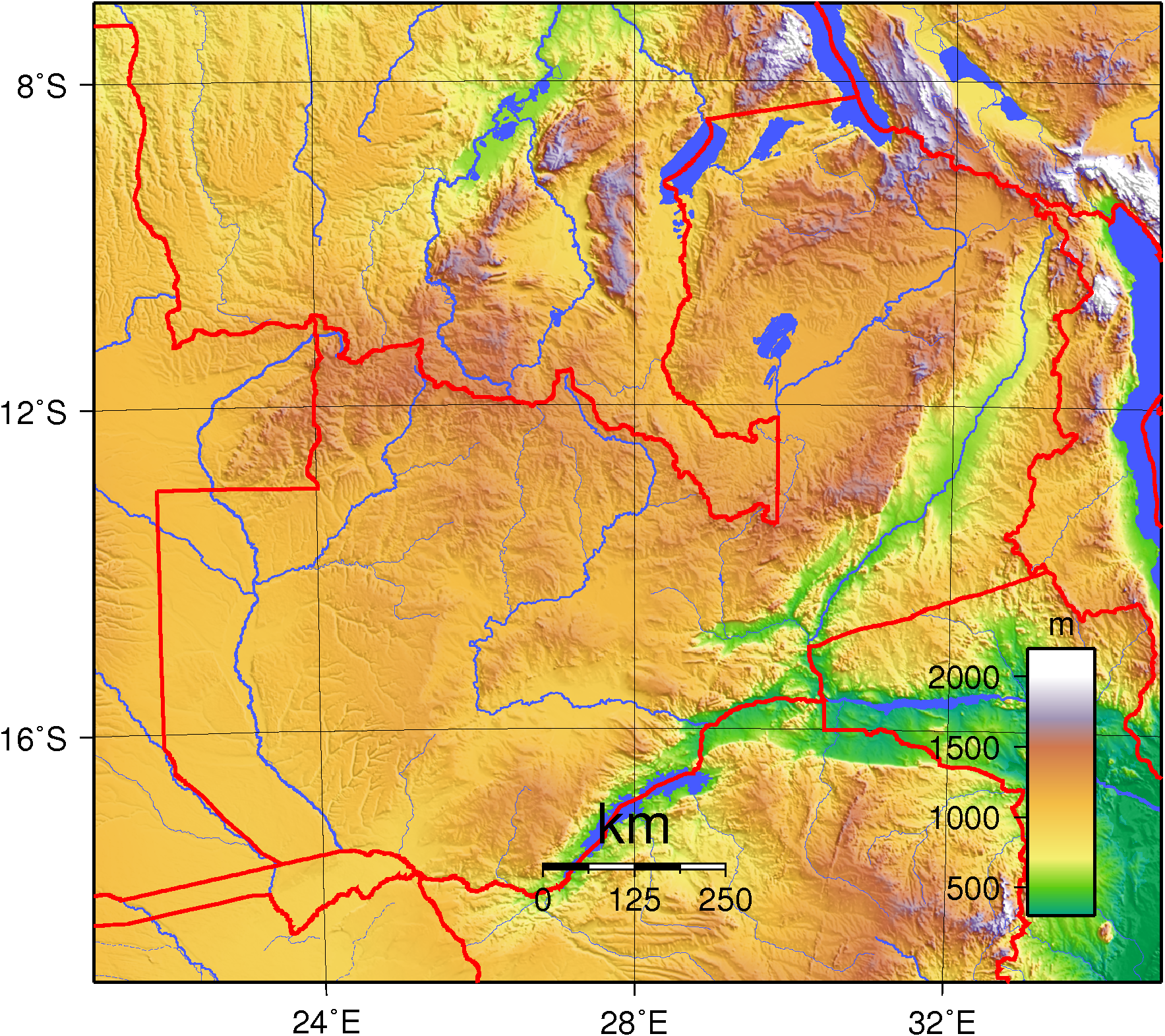
An enlargeable topographic map of Zambia

Area
- Total: 752,618 km²
  - country rank in the world: 38th
- Land: 743,390 km²
- Water: 9,220 km²

Area comparative
- Australia comparative: slightly smaller than New South Wales
- Canada comparative: slightly less than half the size of Quebec
- United Kingdom comparative: slightly more than three times the size of the United Kingdom
- United States comparative: slightly less than twice the size of Montana
- EU comparative: slightly less than 1 1/2 times the size of Spain
Land boundaries
- Total: 5,664 km of land boundaries
- Border countries: Angola for 1,110 km, Democratic Republic of the Congo for 1,930 km, Malawi for 837 km, Mozambique for 419 km, Namibia for 233 km, Tanzania for 338 km, Zimbabwe for 797 km, and Botswana, less than 1 km (0.62 mi).

== Physical geography ==
=== Climate ===
Zambia has a tropical climate, modified by the altitude of the country. There is a rainy season that runs from October/November to March/April.

Köppen climate classification map of Zambia

=== Terrain ===
The terrain of Zambia is mostly high plateau, with some hills and mountains. The lowest point is the Zambezi river, at 329 m (1,079 ft) above sea level, with the highest being Mafinga Central in the Mafinga Hills, at 2,339 m (7,674 ft) above sea level.

Zambia is a landlocked country bordered along Zimbabwe in the south divided by Victoria Falls, Congo DR in the north, Tanzania on the northeast, Malawi on the east and Mozambique on the southeast. The general topography of the country is characterized by uplifted planation surfaces. The general elevation of the nation as a whole is tended towards west to east from the Kalahari Basin. The level of land falls from the upper Congo towards the Zambezi depression in the South forming a plateau.

Zambia lies in the watershed between DR Congo and Zambezi river systems. Leaving two provinces, all other provinces lie in the country frontier formed between the continental divide separating the Atlantic Ocean and the Indian Ocean, which traverses from DR Congo to the south of Tanzania. There are three major seasons: a cool dry season from April to August, a hot dry season from August to November and a warm wet season from November to April. The maximum heat is experienced during November, while the maximum rainfall is received during December. The annual rainfall is more than 700 mm (28 in) in the Southern parts, while is more than 1,100 mm (43 in) in the northern parts. Lake Kariba is the man made lake in Africa and the second largest man made lake in the world and it stretches along the Southern border of the province.

=== Ecoregions ===
Nine ecoregions in four biomes are represented in Zambia, the most widespread being Miombo, Mopane and Baikiaea woodland savanna, with grasslands (mainly flooded grassland) and evergreen forest also present.

== Land use ==
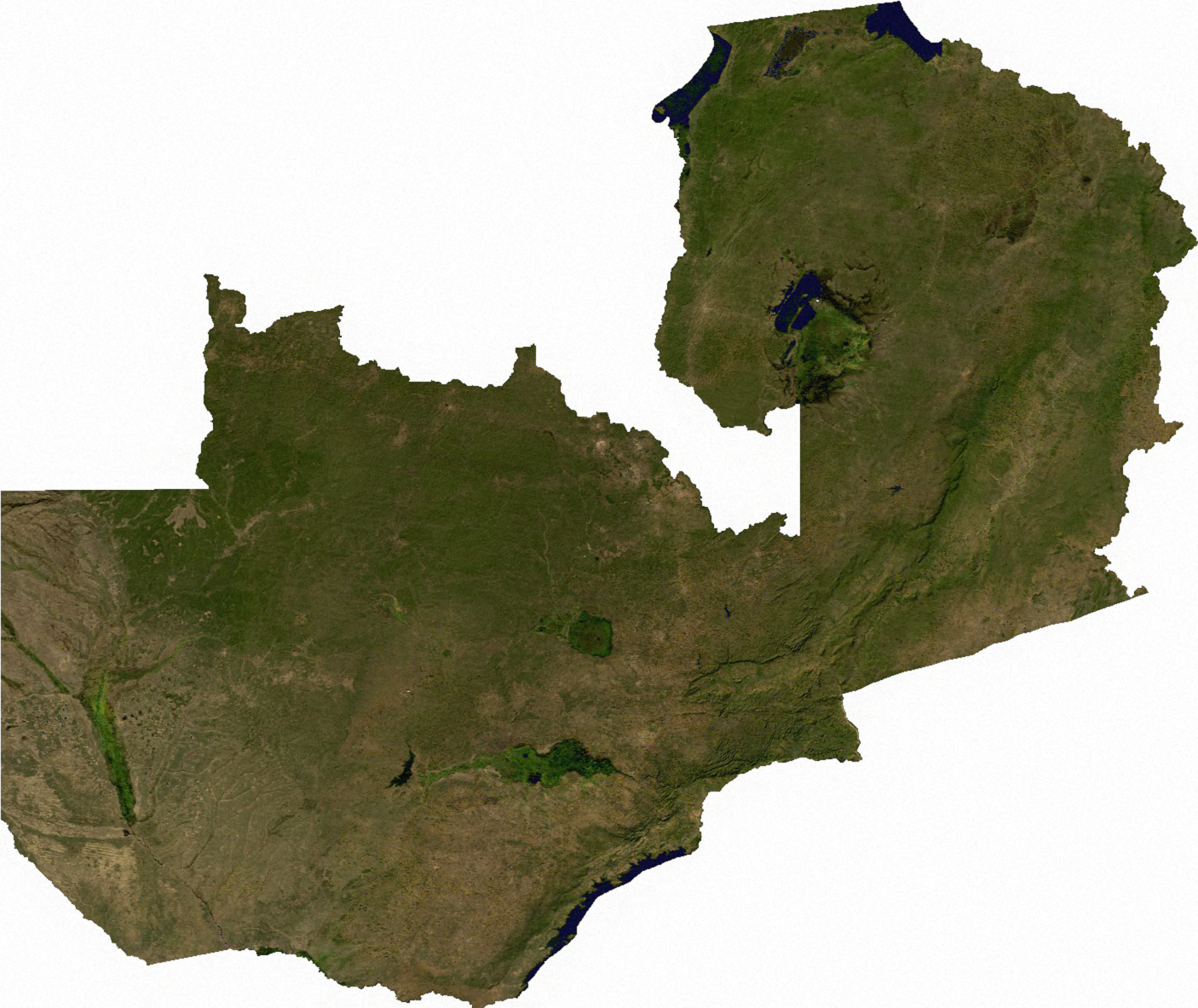
Satellite image of Zambia

The following table describes the land use in Zambia, as of 2011.

Land use
| Use | Percentage of Area |
|---|---|
| arable land | 4.52 |
| permanent crops | 0.05 |
| other | 95.44 |

As of 2005, 1559 km^{2} of land in Zambia is irrigated.

== Environment ==
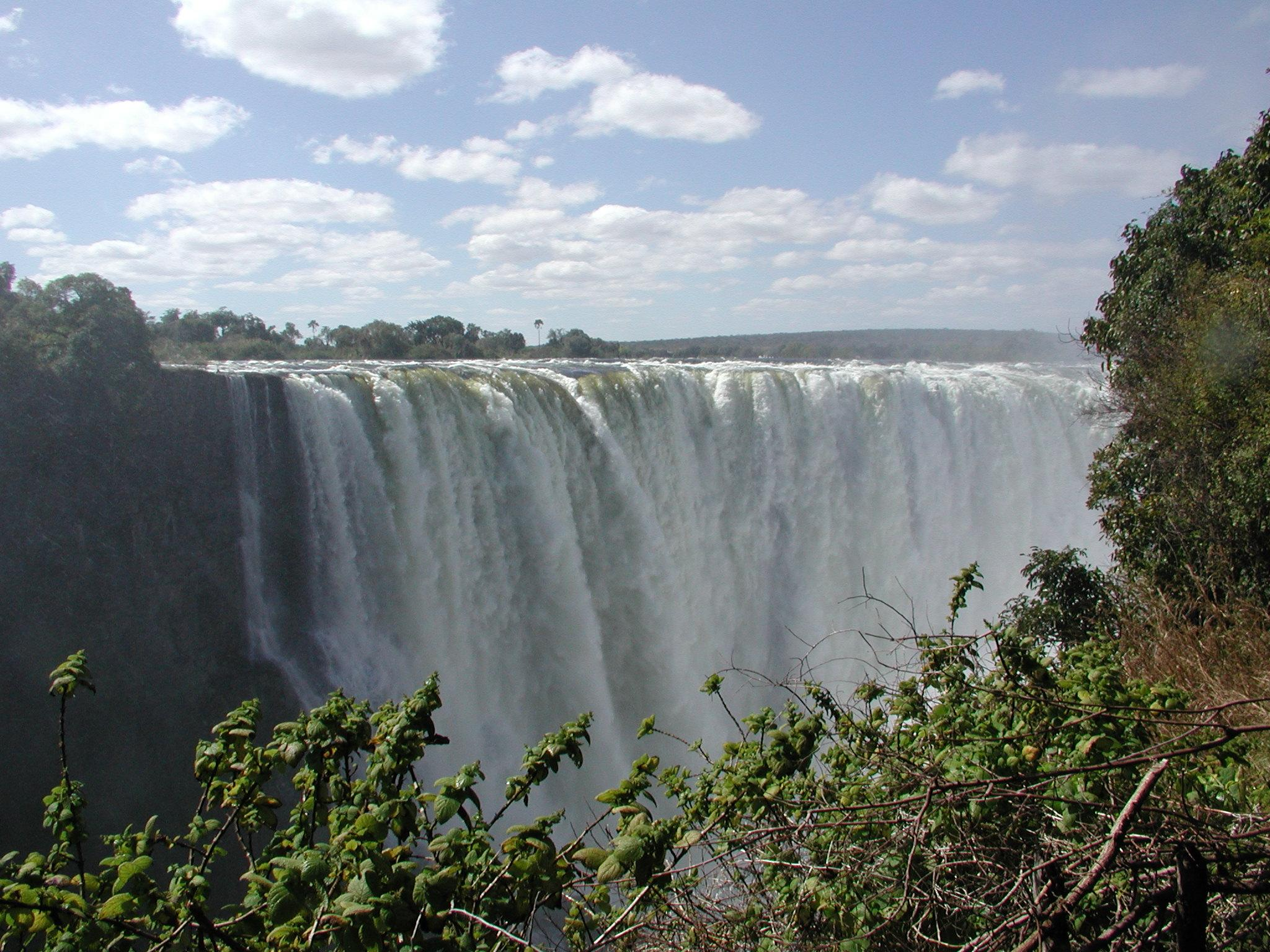
Victoria Falls

Current issues for the environment in the country include: air pollution and resulting acid rain in the mineral extraction and refining region; chemical runoff into watersheds; poaching, which seriously threatens: rhinoceros, elephant, antelope, and large cat populations; deforestation; soil erosion; desertification and lack of adequate water treatment, which presents human health risks.

Zambia is considered to be vulnerable to climate change. The main impact pathway of climate change in the country is through increasing variability in rainfall amounts during the agricultural season across the various agroecological regions, and shifts in the duration of the rainy season. Zambia is considered vulnerable to the impacts of climate change because the majority of the population rely on agriculture for their livelihoods - and changes in rainfall patterns has a negative impact due to the rainfed nature of production. Researched evidence suggested that temperature was likely to increase by 1.82 °C and rainfall reduce by 0.87 percentage points by 2050. This means that the occurrence of extreme climate events such as droughts and floods would become more frequent.

Zambia is party to the following international agreements: Biodiversity, Climate Change, Desertification, Endangered Species, Hazardous Wastes, Law of the Sea, Nuclear Test Ban, Ozone Layer Protection and Wetlands. Zambia has signed, but not ratified, the Kyoto Protocol.

=== Deforestation ===
==== Tree cover extent and loss ====
Global Forest Watch publishes annual estimates of tree cover loss and 2000 tree cover extent derived from time-series analysis of Landsat satellite imagery in the Global Forest Change dataset. In this framework, tree cover refers to vegetation taller than 5 m (including natural forests and tree plantations), and tree cover loss is defined as the complete removal of tree cover canopy for a given year, regardless of cause.

For Zambia, country statistics report cumulative tree cover loss of 2,665,773 ha (26,657.73 km^{2}) from 2001 to 2024 (about 11.1% of its 2000 tree cover area). For tree cover density greater than 30%, country statistics report a 2000 tree cover extent of 24,075,023 ha (240,750.23 km^{2}). The charts and table below display this data. In simple terms, the annual loss number is the area where tree cover disappeared in that year, and the extent number shows what remains of the 2000 tree cover baseline after subtracting cumulative loss. Forest regrowth is not included in the dataset.

Annual tree cover loss in Zambia, 2001–2024. View chart definition.
Tree cover extent in 2000 minus cumulative tree cover loss in Zambia, 2001–2024 (loss-only residual; does not account for gain). View chart definition.

Annual tree cover extent and loss
| Year | Tree cover extent (km2) (Note: This residual measure does not include forest regrowth.) | Annual tree cover loss (km2) |
|---|---|---|
| 2001 | 240,449.19 | 301.04 |
| 2002 | 239,986.44 | 462.75 |
| 2003 | 239,565.57 | 420.87 |
| 2004 | 239,280.84 | 284.73 |
| 2005 | 238,705.39 | 575.45 |
| 2006 | 238,300.69 | 404.70 |
| 2007 | 237,763.00 | 537.69 |
| 2008 | 237,101.98 | 661.02 |
| 2009 | 235,925.72 | 1,176.26 |
| 2010 | 234,197.55 | 1,728.17 |
| 2011 | 233,596.40 | 601.15 |
| 2012 | 232,311.98 | 1,284.42 |
| 2013 | 231,465.25 | 846.73 |
| 2014 | 230,317.15 | 1,148.10 |
| 2015 | 229,445.33 | 871.82 |
| 2016 | 228,031.32 | 1,414.01 |
| 2017 | 226,407.00 | 1,624.32 |
| 2018 | 224,967.78 | 1,439.22 |
| 2019 | 223,721.98 | 1,245.80 |
| 2020 | 222,093.97 | 1,628.01 |
| 2021 | 220,081.69 | 2,012.28 |
| 2022 | 218,291.63 | 1,790.06 |
| 2023 | 216,388.74 | 1,902.89 |
| 2024 | 214,092.50 | 2,296.24 |

==== REDD+ reference levels and monitoring ====
Under the UNFCCC REDD+ framework, Zambia has submitted two national forest reference emission level (FREL) packages. On the UNFCCC REDD+ Web Platform, both the 2016 and 2021 packages are listed as having assessed reference levels and reported safeguards information, while a national strategy and a national forest monitoring system are listed as "not reported" for both packages.

The first assessed FREL, submitted in 2016, covered the REDD+ activity "reducing emissions from deforestation" at national scale. Using a 2005-2014 reference period, the assessed FREL was 25,420,000 t CO2 eq per year. The technical assessment states that it included above-ground biomass, below-ground biomass and deadwood, excluded litter and soil organic carbon, and reported CO2 only.

A second national FREL, submitted in 2021, covered reducing emissions from deforestation and reducing emissions from forest degradation at national scale. Using a 2009-2018 reference period, the original and modified submissions both reported 23,520,000 t CO2 per year, which was also the assessed value. The technical assessment states that it included above-ground biomass, below-ground biomass, deadwood and litter, excluded soil organic carbon, and reported CO2 only.

== Extreme points ==
This is a list of the extreme points of Zambia, the points that are farther north, south, east or west than any other location.

- Northernmost point: Cape Pungu, Northern province
- Easternmost point: Kongula Peak, Northern province
- Southernmost point: unnamed location on the border with Zimbabwe in the Zambezi river, Southern province
- Westernmost point: the western section of the border with Angola (Zambia does not have a westernmost point as the border here is formed by the line of longitude 22° E)
