= Mafinga (constituency) =

Constituency of the National Assembly of Zambia

Mafinga was a constituency of the National Assembly of Zambia. It covered the town of Muyombe and the surrounding rural area in Muchinga Province.

The constituency was established in 1968 as Isoka East. In 2011 it was renamed Mafinga following the establishment of Mafinga District.

== List of MPs ==
Election year	MP	Party
Isoka East
1968	Pius Kasutu	United National Independence Party
Muyombe
1973	Sully Mugala	United National Independence Party
1978	Elwell Muwowo	United National Independence Party
Isoka East
1983	Elwell Muwowo	United National Independence Party
1988	Elwell Muwowo	United National Independence Party
1991	Goodwell Ng'ambi	United National Independence Party
1996	Robert Sichinga	Independent
2001	Catherine Namugala	Movement for Multi-Party Democracy
2006	Catherine Namugala	Movement for Multi-Party Democracy
Mafinga
2011	Catherine Namugala	Movement for Multi-Party Democracy
2016	Jacob Siwale	Patriotic Front
2021	Robert Chabinga	Patriotic Front
Seat abolished (split into Mafinga North and Mafinga South)
