= Mafinga South (constituency) =

National Assembly constituency in Zambia

Mafinga South is a constituency of the National Assembly of Zambia. It was created in 2026 when Mafinga constituency was split into two constituencies (Mafinga South and Mafinga North). It covers the southern part of Mafinga District, including the town of Muyombe.

== List of MPs ==
Election year	MP	Party
2026	Faith Munthali	Citizens First
