= Catherine Namugala =

Zambian politician

Minister of Tourism and the Environment
- In office 2008–2011
- President: Rupiah Banda
- Preceded by: Michael Kaingu
- Succeeded by: Sylvia Masebo

Member of the National Assembly for Mafinga
- In office 2001–2016
- Preceded by: Robert Sichinga
- Succeeded by: Jacob Siwale

First Deputy Speaker
- In office September 2016 – May 2021
- President: Edgar Lungu

Personal details
- Born: Catherine Namugala; 2 January 1966 (age 60) Isoka District, Zambia
- Party: Movement for Multi-Party Democracy (2001 - 2016)

Catherine Namugala is a Zambian politician. She was the First Deputy Speaker of the Zambian Parliament until 2021. She was nominated to that position by President Edgar Lungu, on 18 September 2016. She is the former Minister of Tourism, Environment and Natural Resources in the Zambian Cabinet. She also served as a Member of Parliament (MP), representing Mafinga (previously known as Isoka East) in the Zambian Parliament from 2001 until 2016. She was a member of the Movement for Multiparty Democracy (MMD) party.

== Political career ==
Catherine Namugala stood as the Movement for Multi-Party Democracy (MMD) candidate for member of parliament in Isoka East constituency at the 2001 general election and she was elected. She served as Deputy Minister of Foreign Affairs from 2002 until 2003. From 2003 until 2005, she served as the Deputy Minister of Community Development and Social Services. At the 2006 general election, she stood again as the MMD candidate in Isoka East and was re-elected to parliament. She was then appointed Minister of Community Development and Social Services. Since then, she served as Deputy Minister in the Office of the Vice-President, prior to being appointed Minister of Tourism and the Environment in November 2008. In February 2010, Catherine Namugala was awarded the African Tourism Minister Of The Year Award, beating six contestants from Ghana, Namibia, Sierra Leone, Tanzania, Uganda and Zimbabwe.

In 2011, Isoka East constituency was renamed to Mafinga constituency and Namugala stood again as the MMD candidate in that constituency at the 2011 general election and she was re-elected. Ahead of the 2016 general election, after 15 years as the MP for Isoka East and Mafinga, Namugala chose not to re-contest her parliamentary seat. Instead, she endorsed president Edgar Lungu's re-election bid for the Patriotic Front. After Lungu was re-elected as President of Zambia, he nominated Namugala as the First Deputy Speaker in parliament for the 2016 to 2021 term.

== See also ==
- Cabinet of Zambia
- National Assembly of Zambia
