= Muyombe =

- Location in Zambia
- Coordinates: 10°34′32″S 33°27′09″E
- Country: Zambia
- Province: Muchinga Province
- District: Mafinga District
- Time zone: UTC+2 (CAT)

Muyombe is a rural community town on the M14 road in Mafinga District, a district east of Isoka, Zambia, and it is the biggest settlement in the region, near the Mafinga Hills. The chiefdom is sparsely populated over an area of 625 square miles (1619 square kilometres).
