= Mafinga North =

National Assembly constituency in Zambia

Mafinga North is a constituency of the National Assembly of Zambia. It was created in 2026 when Mafinga constituency was split into two constituencies (Mafinga South and Mafinga North). It covers the northern part of Mafinga District.

== List of MPs ==
Election year	MP	Party
2026	Owen Mutambo	Zambia Must Prosper
