= Katumbi Airport =

Airport in Malawi

- IATA: none; ICAO: FWKB

Summary
- Airport type: Closed
- Serves: Katumbi
- Elevation AMSL: 3,986 ft / 1,215 m
- Coordinates: 10°49′40″S 33°30′30″E

Map
- Location of the airport in Malawi

Runways
Direction	Length		Surface
Direction	ft	m	Surface
Closed
- Sources: Google Maps OurAirports

Katumbi Airport (ICAO: FWKB) was an airport 2 kilometres (1.2 mi) southwest of the village of Katumbi, Republic of Malawi.

In aerial views, the runway appears to have been abandoned sometime after 2002. Trees and shrubs are now growing on the runway area, and runway markings have been removed.

== See also ==
- Transport in Malawi
- List of airports in Malawi
