= Mafinga Central =

Mountain in Zambia

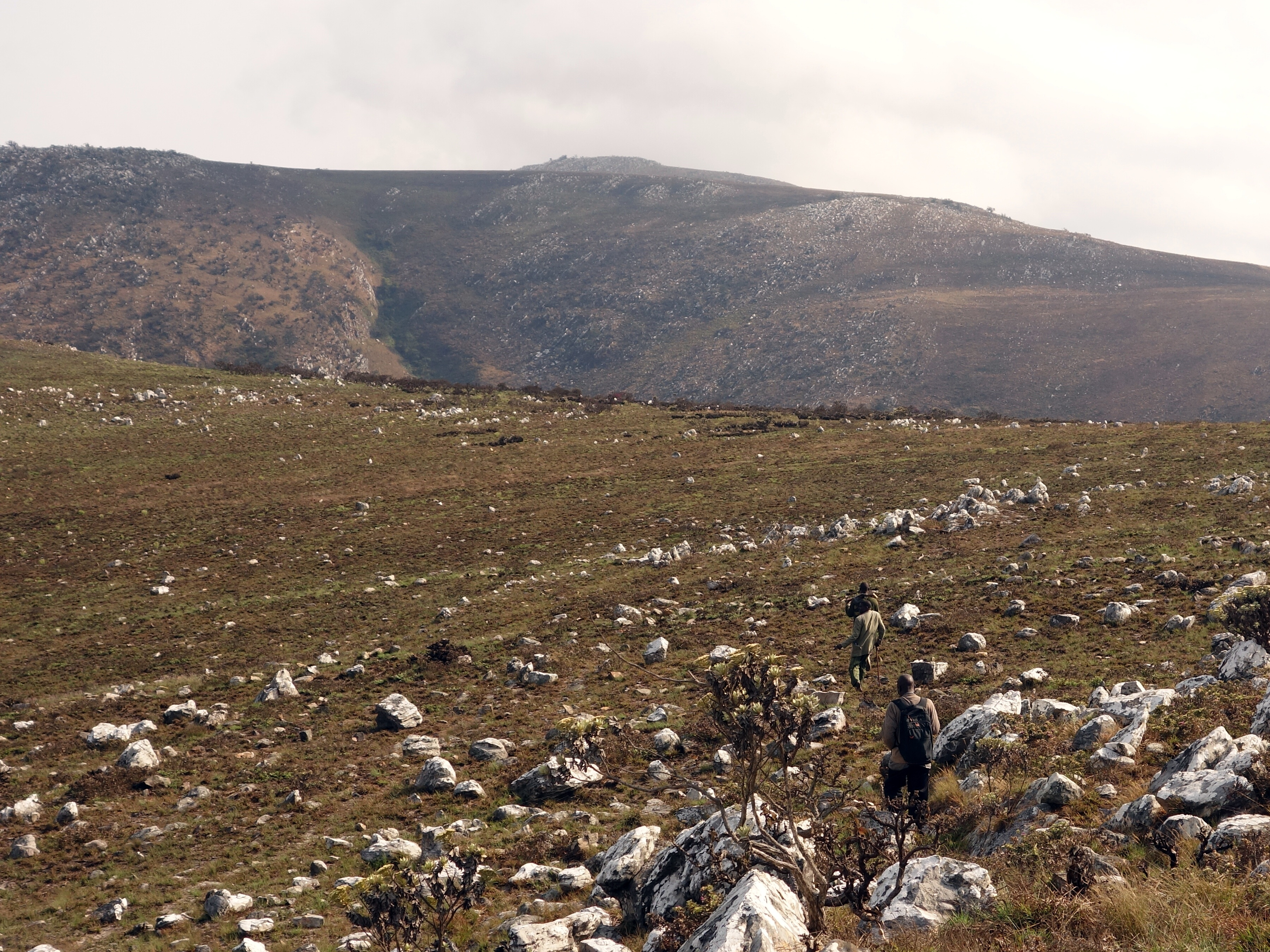
- Mafinga Central from the Mafinga Hills ridge on the Zambia/Malawi border.

Highest point
- Elevation: 2,339 m (7,674 ft)
- Prominence: 907 m (2,976 ft)
- Listing: Country high point
- Coordinates: 9°57′9.7″S 33°21′8.5″E

Geography
- Location within Zambia
- Location: Zambia–Malawi border
- Parent range: Mafinga Hills

Mafinga Central is the highest point in the Mafinga Hills on the border of Zambia and Malawi. At 2,339-metre (7,674 ft) it is likely to be the highest mountain in Zambia. It is most easily accessed from the town of Chisenga in Malawi.

The peak was climbed in 2014 by an international team from the United Kingdom, Malawi and Lithuania, who measured it to be slightly higher than 2,337-metre (7,667 ft) Mafinga South, another peak on the watershed close by. A more accurate survey is needed to establish for certain which of the two peaks is higher. Both peaks are found on the Mafinga Ridge, an area composed of quartzites, phyllites, and feldspathic sandstones of sedimentary origin. The Luangwa River, one of Zambia's major river systems, rises in the Mafinga Hills on the western side of the ridge.
