= Mafinga Hills =

Mountain range

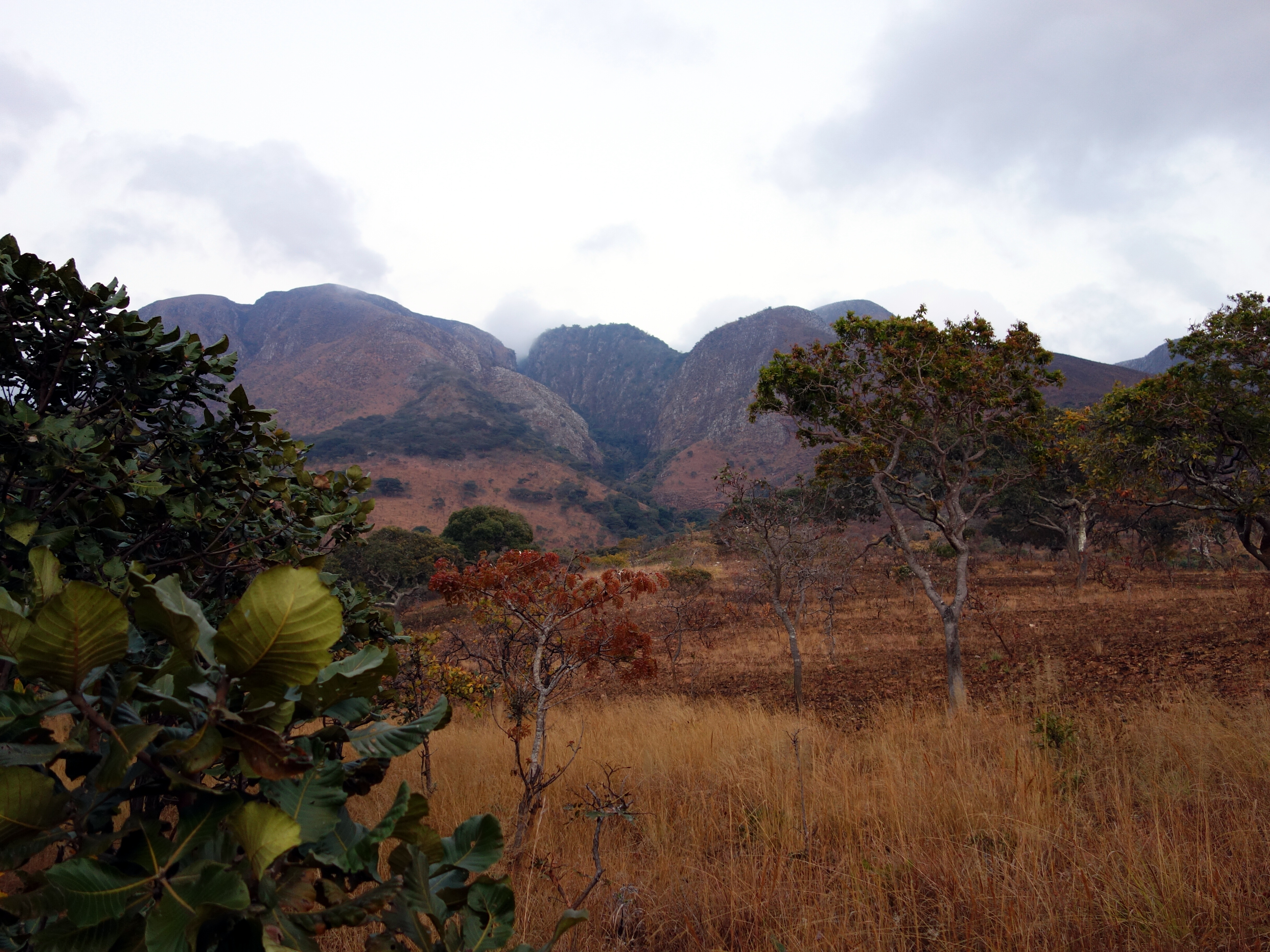
- Mafinga Hills from near the town of Chisenga in Malawi

Highest point
- Elevation: 2,339 m (7,674 ft)
- Coordinates: 9°57′9.7″S 33°21′8.5″E

Geography
- Location: Zambia, Malawi

Geology
- Rock type(s): Quartzite, phyllite and feldspar

The Mafinga Hills are a plateau covered by hills, situated on the border between Zambia and Malawi, in Southern Africa. These hills are composed of quartzites, phyllites and feldspathic sandstones of sedimentary origin.

This plateau has the highest point in Zambia at 2,339-metre (7,674 ft) at Mafinga Central. It once formed a formidable barrier between the Northern and Eastern Provinces. Only very able 4-wheel drive vehicles are able to cross this area, especially during the rainy season.

The Luangwa River, the major river of eastern Zambia, has its source in the Mafinga Hills.

== See also ==
- Geography of Malawi
- Geography of Zambia
- List of countries by highest point
