= Mafinga District =

Coordinates: 10°23′S 33°24′E

- District
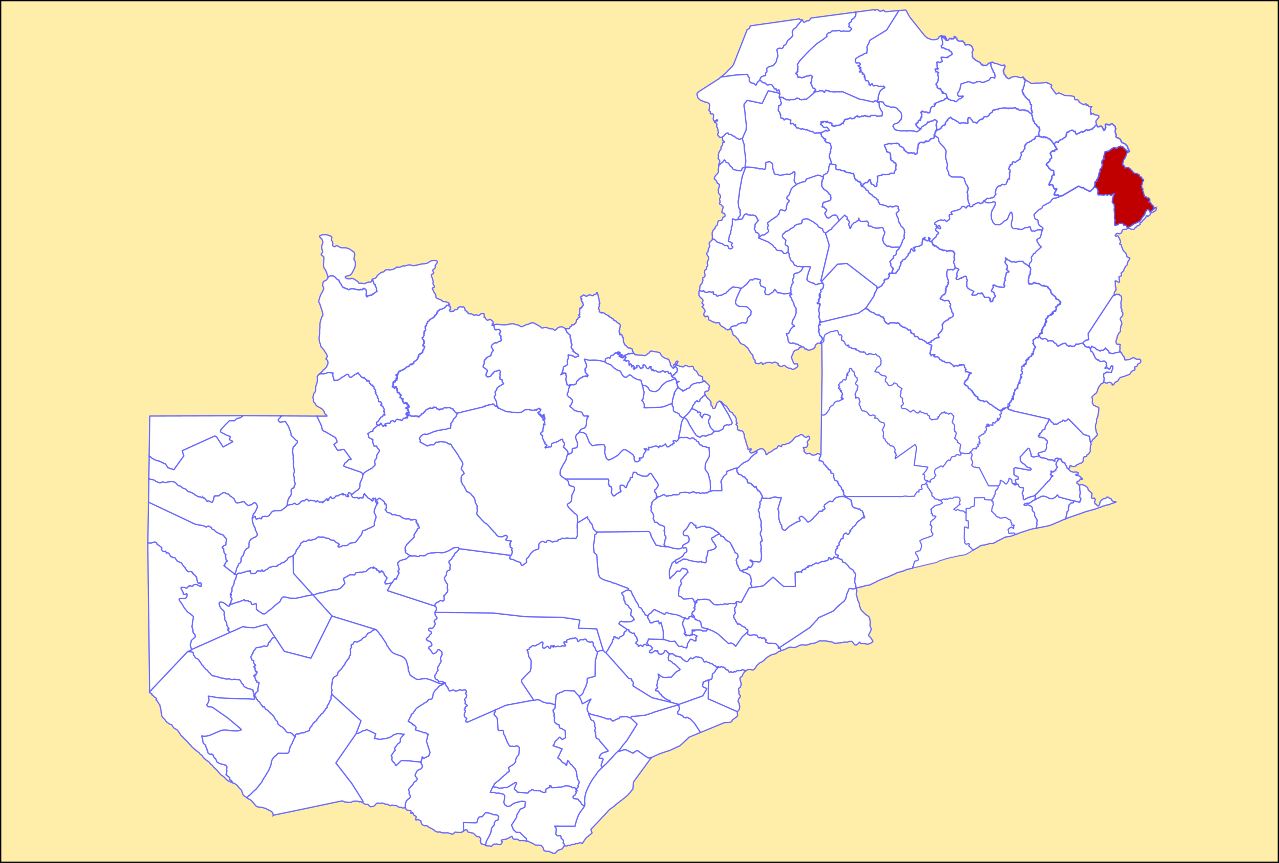
- District location in Zambia
- Country: Zambia
- Province: Muchinga Province
- Capital: Thendere

Area
  - Total: 4,210.4 km^{2} (1,625.6 sq mi)

Population (2022)
  - Total: 102,533
  - Density: 24.352/km^{2} (63.072/sq mi)
- Time zone: UTC+2 (CAT)

Mafinga District is one of the eight districts of Muchinga Province in Zambia. The district headquarters is at Thendere. It also contains the town of Muyombe. It was named after the Mafinga Hills. As of the 2022 Zambian Census, the district had a population of 102,533 people. Chitumbuka, also known as Tumbuka, is the dominant primary language spoken in the district.

Mafinga District was created in 2011 by splitting the existing Isoka District.
