= Politics of Zambia =

Overview of the political system and history of Zambia

The politics of Zambia takes place in a framework of a presidential representative democratic republic, whereby the president is head of state, head of government, and leader of a multi-party system. Executive power is exercised by the government, while legislative power is vested in both the government and parliament. Formerly Northern Rhodesia, Zambia became a republic immediately upon attaining independence in October 1964. Zambia was democratic from independence until 1973. It was a one-party state under the United National Independence Party (UNIP) from 8 December 1972 until multi-party democracy was re-introduced on 4 December 1990, leading to landmark elections on 1 November 1991. Since then, Zambia has established a reputation as one of Africa's most peaceful democracies, regularly achieving peaceful power transfers between four major political parties (UNIP, MMD, PF, and the governing UPND). The most recent shift occurred in August 2021, when opposition leader Hakainde Hichilema defeated incumbent Edgar Lungu. Following a period of democratic backsliding during the late 2010s, Zambia's political environment saw notable democratic gains with the 2021 peaceful power transfer. International assessments reflect a dynamic democratic landscape: Freedom House: Classifies Zambia as "Partly Free", with a score of 53/100 (22/40 for Political Rights, 31/60 for Civil Liberties). While multi-party competition and judicial independence remain active, restrictions on opposition gatherings and selective enforcement of public order laws continue to present operational challenges. Economist Intelligence Unit (EIU): Categorizes Zambia as a "Hybrid Regime", placing it among the top-tier democratic nations in Sub-Saharan Africa. V-Dem Institute: Ranks Zambia 84th globally on its Liberal Democracy Index with a score of 37.5/100, placing it in a hybrid status featuring active electoral competition Alongside developing liberal-democratic checks and balances.

== Government and constitution ==
The constitution promulgated on 25 August 1973 abrogated the original 1964 independence constitution. The 1973 constitution and the national elections that followed in December 1973 established a "one-party participatory democracy." Under this framework, national policy was formulated by the Central Committee of the United National Independence Party (UNIP), the sole legal party, while the cabinet executed policy. Presidential elections featured only the UNIP party leader, and the UNIP secretary-general held the second-highest position in the state hierarchy. In December 1990, following severe economic unrest, widespread protests, and a failed coup attempt, President Kenneth Kaunda signed legislation ending UNIP’s political monopoly. Negotiated reforms led to a new constitution in August 1991, which re-introduced multi-party democracy, enlarged the National Assembly to a maximum of 158 members, and established an independent electoral body. A 1996 constitutional amendment introduced a retroactive two-term presidential limit and mandated that candidates' parents be Zambian-born. Constitutional governance was substantially overhauled through the Constitution of Zambia (Amendment) Act No. 2 of 2016, which introduced a majoritarian 50%+1 system for electing the president, running-mate vice presidents, and fixed election dates. Further structural changes were enacted under the Constitution of Zambia (Amendment) Act No. 13 of 2025 (commonly referred to as Bill 7), which was passed by the National Assembly and assented to by President Hakainde Hichilema in December 2025. Key provisions of the Act include: Electoral System Reform: Transitioning the parliamentary electoral framework to a mixed-member proportional representation system, reserving dedicated proportional seats for women, youth, and persons with disabilities alongside constituency-based seats. Assembly Expansion: Expanding the composition of constituency-based seats in the National Assembly from 156 to 226 seats based on the Electoral Commission of Zambia's delimitation reports. Local and Executive Governance: Adjusting term structures for municipal councils, modifying procedures regarding parliamentary by-elections, and revising rules governing candidate nominations and executive resignations prior to general elections. Zambia is politically divided into ten provinces, each administered by an appointed Provincial Minister acting as the executive representative of the government.

== Political history ==
The major figure in Zambian politics from 1964 to 1991 was Kenneth Kaunda, who led the fight for independence and sought to reduce political rivalries among the country's various regions and ethnic groups. Kaunda tried to base government on his philosophy of "humanism", which condemned human exploitation and stressed cooperation among people, but not at the expense of the individual. During Kaunda's presidency, members of all ethnic groups were represented by ministers in the government, in relation to their demographic size.

Zambia conducted three democratic elections (1962, 1964, and 1968) after achieving independence. The elections were marred by violence and irregularities, but all parties respected the election results.

Before 1972, Zambia had three significant political parties: the United National Independence Party (UNIP), the African National Congress (ANC), and the United Progressive Party (UPP). The ANC drew its strength from the western and southern provinces, while the UPP found some support among Bemba speakers in the Copperbelt and northern provinces. Although not strongly supported in all areas of the country, only UNIP had a nationwide following.

=== One-party state ===
In February 1972, Zambia became a one-party state, and all other political parties were banned. Kenneth Kaunda, the sole candidate, was elected president in the 1973 elections. Elections also were held for the National Assembly. Only UNIP members were permitted to run, but these seats were sharply contested. President Kaunda's mandate was renewed in December 1978 and October 1983 in a "yes" or "no" vote on his candidacy. In the 1983 election, more than 60% of those registered participated and gave President Kaunda a 95.38% "yes" vote.

=== 1991: Move to a multiparty state ===
Growing opposition to UNIP's monopoly on power led to the rise in 1990 of the Movement for Multiparty Democracy (MMD). The MMD assembled an increasingly impressive group of important Zambians, including prominent UNIP defectors and labour leaders. During the year, President Kaunda agreed to a referendum on the one-party state but, in the face of continued opposition, dropped the referendum and signed a constitutional amendment making Zambia a multi-party state. Zambia's first multi-party elections for parliament and the presidency since the 1960s were held on 31 October 1991. MMD candidate Frederick Chiluba resoundingly carried the presidential election over Kenneth Kaunda with 76% of the vote. To add to the MMD landslide, in the parliamentary elections the MMD won 125 of the 150 elected seats and UNIP the remaining 25. However, UNIP swept the Eastern Province, gathering 19 of its seats there.

=== 1991–2001: MMD and Frederick Chiluba ===
By the end of Chiluba's first term as president (1996), the MMD's commitment to political reform had faded in the face of re-election demands. A number of prominent supporters founded opposing parties. Relying on the MMD's overwhelming majority in parliament, President Chiluba in May 1996 pushed through constitutional amendments that eliminated former President Kaunda and other prominent opposition leaders from the 1996 presidential elections.

In the presidential and parliamentary elections held in November 1996, Chiluba was re-elected, and the MMD won 131 of the 150 seats in the National Assembly. Kaunda's UNIP party boycotted the parliamentary polls to protest the exclusion of its leader from the presidential race, alleging in addition that the outcome of the election had been predetermined due to a faulty voter registration exercise. Despite the UNIP boycott, the elections took place peacefully, and five presidential and more than 600 parliamentary candidates from 11 parties participated. Afterward, however, several opposition parties and non-governmental organisations declared the elections neither free nor fair. As President Chiluba began his second term in 1997, the opposition continued to reject the results of the election amid international efforts to encourage the MMD and the opposition to resolve their differences through dialogue.

Early in 2001, supporters of President Chiluba mounted a campaign to amend the constitution to enable Chiluba to seek a third term of office. Civil society, opposition parties, and many members of the ruling party complimented widespread popular opposition to exert sufficient pressure on Chiluba to force him to back away from any attempt at a third term.

Presidential, parliamentary, and local government elections were held on 27 December 2001. Eleven parties contested the elections. The elections encountered numerous administrative problems. Opposition parties alleged that serious irregularities occurred. Nevertheless, MMD presidential candidate Levy Mwanawasa was declared the victor by a narrow margin, and he was sworn into office on 2 January 2002. Three parties submitted petitions to the High Court, challenging the presidential election results. The courts decided that there had been irregularities but that they were not serious enough to have affected the overall result, thus the election result was upheld. Opposition parties won a majority of parliamentary seats in the December, 2001 election, but subsequent by-elections gave the ruling MMD a slim majority in Parliament.

=== 2001–2008 ===
In the 2006 presidential election was hotly contested, with Mwanawasa being re-elected by a clear margin over principal challengers Michael Sata of the Patriotic Front and Hakainde Hichilema of the United Party for National Development (UPND).

The parliamentary election that same year awarded MMD with 72 seats, the remaining 84 seats split among other parties with the majority of those seats going to the Patriotic Front.

The presidency of Levy Mwanawasa until his death in office in mid-2008, was different from the flamboyant expenditure and increasingly apparent corruption of the later years of Frederick Chiluba's terms in office. Indeed, the former president was arrested and charged with several counts of embezzlement and corruption, firmly quashing initial fears that President Mwanawasa would turn a blind eye to the allegations of his predecessor's improprieties.

Mwanawasa was accused by some observers of demonstrating an authoritarian streak in early 2004 when his Minister of Home Affairs issued a deportation order to a British citizen and long-time Zambian resident Roy Clarke, who had published a series of satirical attacks on the president in the independent Post newspaper. However, when Clarke appealed to the High Court against the order, the judge ruled that the order was arbitrary and unjustified and quashed the order. President Mwanawasa, true to his mantra of heading a government of laws, respected the court decision and Clarke was allowed to resume his column of satirical critique. Mwanawasa's early zeal to root out corruption also waned somewhat, with key witnesses in the Chiluba trial leaving the country. The Constitutional Review Commission set up by Mwanawasa also hit some turbulence, with arguments as to where its findings should be submitted leading to suspicions that he has been trying to manipulate the outcome. Generally, the Zambian electorate viewed Mwanawasa's rule as a great improvement over Chiluba's.

Following Mwanawasa's death in August 2008, Zambian vice-president Rupiah Banda succeeded him to the office of president, to be held as a temporary position until the emergency election on 30 October 2008. Banda won by a narrow margin over opposition leader Michael Sata, to complete the remainder of Mwanawasa's term.

=== 2011 elections ===
Rupiah Banda failed to be re-elected in the 2011 Presidential and Parliamentary elections, losing to Michael Sata of the Patriotic Front. This brought an end to a total of 20 years' rule by three presidents from the MMD.

=== 2015–present ===
Edgar Chagwa Lungu was sworn in as president of Zambia on 25 January 2015, succeeding acting-president Guy Scott who briefly held the office after the passing of Michael Chiluyfa Sata. Lungu's presidency has thus far been criticised for failing to halt the depreciating Kwacha. There have also been unsubstantiated reports of Lungu's alleged alcoholism, stemming from a reported physical collapse early in his presidency. The economic challenges facing Zambia, in particular the depreciating Kwacha, have been attributed to the global fall of commodity prices. Zambia derives over 90% of its export earnings from a single commodity, copper, which has lost about 45% of its value on the international commodity market.

On 5 January 2016, Lungu successfully concluded long-standing constitutional issues when he assented to the 2015 Constitutional Amendment Bill. This bill is the result of extensive work begun during the Mwanawasa era (The Mwanakatwe Commission) and continued by the Michael Chilufya Sata appointed Technical Committee. As justice minister, Lungu had previously presented the draft constitution to parliament, where it was subsequently decided that non-contentious issues will be debated in parliament and contentious issues will be subject to a referendum. In the August 2016 Zambian general election, President Edgar Lungu won re-election narrowly in the first round of the election. The opposition had allegations of fraud and the governing Patriotic Front (PF) rejected the allegations made by opposition UPND party. However, in 2020 the Parliament through the office of the justice minister (Given Lubinda) proposed a bill called Bill 10, which was rejected in Parliament on its third reading.

In the 2021 general elections, characterised by a 70% voter turnout, Hakainde Hichilema won 59% of the vote, with his closest rival, incumbent president Edgar Chagwa Lungu, receiving 39% of the vote. On 16 August Edgar Lungu conceded in a TV statement, sending a letter and congratulating president-elect Hakainde Hichilema. On 24 August 2021, Hakainde Hichilema was sworn in as the new President of Zambia.

== Executive branch ==
The executive branch of the Zambian government is vested in the president who is elected in a two round system. Presidents serve terms of five years and are limited to two terms.

Prior to the 2016 Constitutional Amendment the Zambian vice-president was appointed by the president, but the current 2016 amendment puts the vice-president on the same electoral ticket as the president (running mate) (Article 110 Sec 2, 3 and 4) and in the event of a vacancy of an elected president the vice-president is the immediate successor to the president and remains president until the next general election (Article 106 Sec 5(a) and Sec 6). This is in contrast to the 1996 constitution that required a by-election within 90 days of an elected president's vacancy with the vice-president acting as an interim (as was the case with former Acting-President Guy Scott in October 2014 to January 2015 and former President Rupiah Banda in 2008 after the deaths of Presidents Sata and Mwanawasa respectively).

The presidency is currently filled by Hakainde Hichilema with Mutale Nalumango as vice-president since 2021.

== Legislative branch ==
The unicameral National Assembly of Zambia is the country's legislative body. The current National Assembly, formed following elections held on 12 August 2021, has a total of 167 members. 156 members are directly elected in single-member constituencies using the simple majority (or First-past-the-post) system. 8 seats are filled through presidential appointment, and 3 seats are held by ex-officio members: the Vice President, the Speaker and one Deputy Speaker. All members serve five-year terms.

== Political parties and elections ==
=== Presidential elections ===
Candidate	Running mate	Party	Votes	%
Hakainde Hichilema	Mutale Nalumango	United Party for National Development	2,852,348	59.02
Edgar Lungu	Nkandu Luo	Patriotic Front	1,870,780	38.71
Harry Kalaba	Judith Kabemba	Democratic Party	25,231	0.52
Andyford Banda	Gerald Mulao	People’s Alliance For Change	19,937	0.41
Fred M'membe	Cosmas Musumali	Socialist Party	16,644	0.34
Highvie Hamududu	Kasote Singogo	Party of National Unity and Progress	10,480	0.22
Chishala Kateka	Samuel Kasanka	New Heritage Party	8,169	0.17
Charles Chanda	Simon Mbulu	United Prosperous and Peaceful Zambia	6,543	0.14
Lazarus Chisela	Rosemary Chivumba	Zambians United For Sustainable Development	5,253	0.11
Nevers Mumba	Reuben Sambo	Movement for Multi-Party Democracy	4,968	0.10
Enock Tonga	Bright Chomba	3rd Liberation Movement	3,112	0.06
Trevor Mwamba	John Harawa	United National Independence Party	3,036	0.06
Sean Enock Tembo	Henry Muleya	Patriots For Economic Progress	1,813	0.04
Stephen Nyirenda	Lucy Changwe	National Restoration Party	1,808	0.04
Kasonde Mwenda	Changala Siame	Economic Freedom Fighters	1,345	0.03
Richard Silumbe	Kaela Kamwenshe	Leadership Movement	1,296	0.03
Total			4,832,763	100.00
Valid votes			4,832,763	97.45
Invalid/blank votes			126,569	2.55
Total votes			4,959,332	100.00
Registered voters/turnout			7,023,499	70.61
Source: Electoral Commission

=== Parliamentary elections ===
The election in Kaumbwe constituency did not take place on 12 August due to the death of the UPND candidate and was postponed until 21 October 2021.

Party	Votes	%	Seats	+/–
United Party for National Development	2,230,324	46.22	82	+24
Patriotic Front	1,722,718	35.70	60	–20
Socialist Party	61,325	1.27	0	New
Democratic Party	50,886	1.05	0	0
People's Alliance for Change	20,227	0.42	0	0
Party of National Unity and Progress	13,178	0.27	1	+1
United National Independence Party	12,742	0.26	0	0
Forum for Democracy and Development	4,006	0.08	0	–1
National Democratic Congress	3,807	0.08	0	New
Movement for Multi-Party Democracy	3,665	0.08	0	–3
Leadership Movement	3,585	0.07	0	New
Christian Democratic Party	3,471	0.07	0	New
New Heritage Party	1,762	0.04	0	0
Golden Party Zambia	858	0.02	0	New
National Restoration Party	664	0.01	0	0
Zambians United for Sustainable Development	554	0.01	0	New
Green Party of Zambia	499	0.01	0	0
United Prosperous and Peaceful Zambia	309	0.01	0	New
Movement for Democratic Change	306	0.01	0	New
Patriots for Economic Progress	232	0.00	0	New
Economic Freedom Fighters	104	0.00	0	0
Independents	690,418	14.31	13	–1
Appointed and ex-officio			11	–
Total	4,825,640	100.00	167	0
Valid votes	4,825,640	97.74		
Invalid/blank votes	111,726	2.26		
Total votes	4,937,366	100.00		
Registered voters/turnout	7,023,499	70.30		
Source: Electoral Commission

== Judicial branch ==
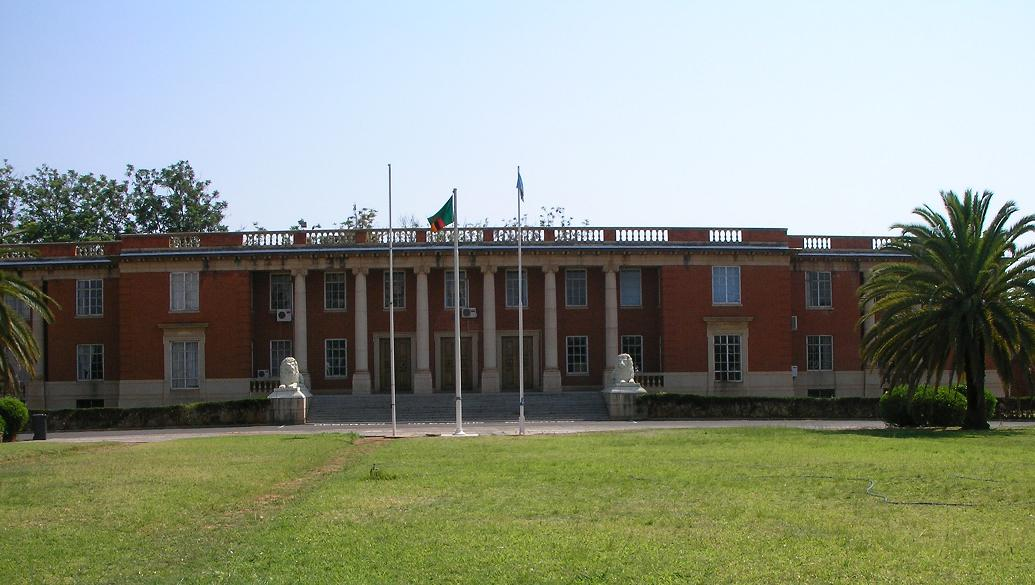
Supreme Court building in Lusaka

The Supreme Court is the highest court and the court of appeal; below it are the high court, magistrate's court, and local courts. A separate Constitutional Court was established in 2016.

== Military ==
The Zambian Defense Force (ZDF) consists of the army, the air force, and the Zambian National Service (ZNS). The ZDF is designed primarily for external defence. The Zambian Police force is not part of the defence force, it was established for internal security services and is under the ministry of home affairs.

== Foreign relations ==
Zambia is a member of the Non-Aligned Movement (NAM), the Commonwealth, the African Union (and its predecessor the Organization of African Unity or OAU), the Southern African Development Community (SADC), and the Common Market for Africa (COMA), which is headquartered in Lusaka.

President Kaunda was a persistent and visible advocate of change in Southern Africa, supporting liberation movements in Mozambique, Namibia, Southern Rhodesia (Zimbabwe), and South Africa. Many of these organisations were based in Zambia during the 1970s and 1980s.

President Chiluba assumed a somewhat higher profile internationally in the mid- and late 1990s. His government played a constructive regional role sponsoring Angola peace talks that led to the 1994 Lusaka Protocols. Zambia has provided troops to UN peacekeeping initiatives in Mozambique, Rwanda, Angola, and Sierra Leone. Zambia was the first African state to cooperate with the International Criminal Tribunal for Rwanda into the Rwandan genocide in 1994.

In 1998, Zambia took the lead in efforts to establish a cease-fire in the Democratic Republic of Congo. Zambia was active in the Congolese peace effort after the signing of a cease-fire agreement in Lusaka in July and August 1999, although activity diminished considerably after the Joint Military Commission tasked with implementing the ceasefire relocated to Kinshasa in September 2001.

Zambia is also a member of the International Criminal Court with a Bilateral Immunity Agreement of protection for the US-military (as covered under Article 98).

=== Participation in international organisations ===
Zambia is a member of ACP, AfDB, COMESA, ECA, FAO, G-19, G-77, IAEA, IBRD, ICAO, ICCt, ICFTU, ICRM, IDA, IFAD, IFC, IFRCS, ILO, IMF, Interpol, IOC, IOM, ITU, MONUC, NAM, OAU, OPCW, PCA, SADC, UN, UNAMSIL, UNCTAD, UNESCO, UNIDO, UNMEE, UNMIK, UPU, WCL, WCO, WHO, WIPO, WMO, WToO and the WTO.

== See also ==
- Bibliography of the history of Zambia
