= Miles Sampa =

Zambian politician (born 1970)

Honorable Miles Bwalya Sampa

President of the Patriotic Front
- Incumbent
- Assumed office 24 October 2023
- Preceded by: Given Lubinda (Acting)

Member of the National Assembly
- In office 14 August 2021 – 15 May 2026
- Preceded by: Lloyd Kaziya
- Succeeded by: Alexander Sakala
- Constituency: Matero
- In office September 2011 – August 2016
- Preceded by: Faustina Bwalya
- Succeeded by: Lloyd Kaziya
- Constituency: Matero

Mayor of Lusaka District
- In office 27 July 2018 – August 2021
- Preceded by: Wilson Kalumba
- Succeeded by: Chilando Chitangala

Personal details
- Born: 26 December 1970 (age 55) Lusaka, Zambia
- Party: Patriotic Front
- Spouse: Nchimunya Hampinda Sampa
- Children: 7

Miles Bwalya Sampa is a Zambian politician, currently serving as the president of the Patriotic Front. He previously served as Mayor of Lusaka, having been elected on 26 July 2018, and as Matero constituency member of Parliament on two occasions (from 2011 to 2016 and from 2021 to 2026).

== Political career ==
In the 2011 general election, Sampa stood as the Patriotic Front candidate for parliament in Matero constituency in Lusaka District and he won the seat.

President Michael Sata appointed Sampa as the Provincial Minister for Lusaka Province in September 2011 before transferring him to being the Provincial Minister for Southern Province in December 2011. The president then appointed Sampa as the Deputy Minister of Finance in March 2012. Sampa was then appointed as the Deputy Minister of Commerce, Trade and Industry in May 2013.

After the death of Michael Sata, the fifth President of Zambia, who was Sampa's uncle, Sampa was elected as President of the Patriotic Front at a controversial Patriotic Front (PF) general party conference. His election was later deemed illegal by the High Court of Zambia, and Defense Minister Edgar Lungu was declared the rightful president of the PF, with Lungu proceeding to be elected as the President of Zambia at the presidential by-election in February 2015. After Lungu won the presidential election, Sampa was reappointed as Deputy Minister of Commerce, Trade and Industry until November 2015 when he resigned from his position. He resigned from the Patriotic Front party in January 2016.

He attempted to form a party named the United Democratic Front (UDF). Sampa entered alliances with Elias Chipimo's National Restoration Party and Eric Chanda's 4th Revolution Party, before eventually endorsing Hakainde Hichilema and the UPND to win the 2016 general election. After the UPND lost the election, Sampa rejoined the Patriotic Front.

After the death of the incumbent mayor of Lusaka District, Wilson Kalumba, the Patriotic Front adopted Sampa to stand as their candidate in the by-election, which took place on 26 July 2018. Sampa was elected as the Mayor of Lusaka. Ahead of the 2021 general election, Sampa opted to reclaim the position of Member of Parliament (MP) for Matero constituency (rather than standing again for mayor). He won the Matero parliamentary seat for a second time.

Miles Sampa was one of eight Patriotic Front members who decided to stand for the position of party president after Edgar Lungu announced his retirement from active politics following the 2021 general election (leaving Given Lubinda as the acting party president). Sampa was one of the people who claimed that the Patriotic Front was taking too long to hold its party convention to choose the leader.

Eventually, there was a controversial extraordinary general conference in October 2023 where Miles Sampa was declared the president of the Patriotic Front (PF) party, defeating seven other aspirants for the position.

Emmanuel Mwamba (the PF Information and Publicity Chairperson; one of the other seven candidates) argued that the convention that took place was illegal and contrary to the outlined procedures in the party's constitution. The convention left the PF party divided and the matter was soon taken to the Lusaka High Court. Acting president Given Lubinda subsequently suspended Sampa from the PF.

In the same month, Edgar Lungu had announced his return to active politics and Lubinda subsequently gave Lungu back the position of party president (Lubinda was demoted to party vice-president). Due to the high court lifting the injunction on Sampa assuming his role as party president, the Patriotic Front had two factions (one with Lungu as the leader and one with Sampa as the leader).

On 25 May 2024, the Lusaka High Court dismissed the case in which six of the PF presidential candidates challenged the election of Sampa as the PF president, declaring him as the party president until further notice.

On 30 June 2024, Sampa decided to dismiss his secretary-general (SG), Morgan Ng'ona, from his SG position. Within a week, the court issued an ex-parte stay order which blocked Sampa's decision to dismiss Ng'ona as SG. Ng'ona then decided to dismiss Sampa as the president of the party and appoint Robert Chabinga (who was the Mafinga MP and leader of the opposition) as the acting party president in July 2024. On 10 November 2024, Chabinga decided to expel Sampa among others from the Patriotic Front. This leadership dispute between Ng'ona and Sampa was taken to court and Sampa further decided to pursue contempt of court charges against Ng'ona and Chabinga for portraying the latter as the party president during the ongoing leadership court case after the court ordered them not to.

On 25 March 2025, the High Court of Zambia confirmed Sampa's decision (made on 30 June 2024) to dismiss Ng'ona as the party SG, effectively declaring Sampa as the president and acting SG of the party. He proceeded to expel Chabinga and a few others from the Patriotic Front party, which was challenged in court.

On 1 May 2025, Sampa decided to reunite his Patriotic Front faction with the faction for Edgar Lungu, effectively stepping down from the party presidency. Lungu was handed back the party presidency and Given Lubinda was handed back the party vice-presidency (and therefore was acting president in Lungu's absence), with Sampa being appointed as the leader of the opposition. However, the parliament speaker declined to recognize Sampa as the leader of the opposition, citing that Robert Chabinga was still recognized in that position (the PF faction led by Lungu was viewed to not have the authority to make the decision on who should be the leader of opposition).

In November 2025, the PF faction acting president, Given Lubinda, appointed Sampa as the party secretary-general for politics. In January 2026, due to state authorities recognizing Chabinga as the president of the Patriotic Front, the Kabwe High Court issued an injunction which effectively banned the other faction for which Sampa was the secretary-general for politics from doing activities in the name of the Patriotic Front.

On 15 March 2026, Lubinda announced that after many delays, his PF faction would host a convention to choose their new leader within four days. The convention took place virtually on 21 March 2026 and the delegates that were present elected Makebi Zulu to be the president of the party faction. With the Kabwe High Court injunction from January still in effect, Sampa among other PF presidential aspirants decided to avoid participating in the convention.

On 3 March 2026, the Lusaka High Court had dismissed the case in which Morgan Ng'ona challenged his expulsion from the PF by Sampa, which meant that the appointment of Robert Chabinga as party president would have to be nullified. On 27 March 2026, the Lusaka High Court had ruled that the 24 October 2023 convention that elected Sampa as party president was not illegal. Due to these two judgements, Sampa proceeded to recognize himself as the PF president once again and proceeded to declare a few changes within the party, thereby creating a party faction that is separate from the one that elected Makebi Zulu as party president.

In April 2026, Miles Sampa endorsed Chitalu Chilufya to stand as the Patriotic Front candidate for presidency at the 2026 general election, with Sampa deciding to instead stand for member of parliament in a separate constituency of Lusaka District from Matero constituency, where he was the incumbent. However, on 18 May 2026, Sampa had made a public announcement stating that the Patriotic Front will withdraw its presidential candidate and not participate in the 2026 general election. The next day, Chilufya withdrew his intentions to stand as the Patriotic Front presidential candidate, stating that the party was still going through legal challenges. Sampa proceeded to apply to stand as an independent MP candidate in the newly-created Lima constituency (which is a division of Matero for which he was previously the MP) while Chilufya proceeded to stand as an independent MP candidate in the newly-created Mansa West constituency, which meant that the Patriotic Front would not field any candidate at any local government level at the 2026 general election. Sampa then withdrew his independent candidature in Lima constituency in order to continue resolving the issue of his Patriotic Front presidency being challenged. In June 2026, Sampa reported that the central committee in his party (the Patriotic Front) had endorsed the incumbent head of state (Hakainde Hichilema of the UPND) to win the 2026 general election. On 12 June 2026, Sampa's party joined the UPND Alliance.
