= Saboi Imboela =

Zambian politician

President of the National Democratic Congress
- Incumbent
- Assumed office 2021
- Preceded by: Chishimba Kambwili

Personal details
- Born: 10 October 1977 (age 48) Zambia
- Party: United Party for National Development (up to 2017); National Democratic Congress (2017 to present)
- Children: 3
- Education: University of Zambia, Canterbury University

Saboi Imboela (born 10 October 1977) is a Zambian politician who leads the National Democratic Congress political party. Previously, she was a singer for the singing group Shatel in the late 1990s and early 2000s.

== Early life and education ==
Imboela was born on 10 October 1977 to late Police Chief Edwin Imboela. She has a certificate in Journalism from Manfield College and a diploma in computer studies from ZAMIM. She later enrolled at University of London (Westlyn College) where she did law, sociology and English. She then went to the University of Zambia and commenced her full time study in Political Science and Development Studies. There, she graduated as the best student in her field and was later offered her a job as a tutor. In 2012, Saboi left the country for New Zealand to study at Canterbury University where she obtained her master's degree in International Law of Politics.

She also holds a Certificate in Planning, Monitoring and Evaluation from the University of Zambia and a Certificate in Diplomacy, Protocol and Public Relations from ZIDIS.

== Music career ==
In the late '90s, Imboela teamed up with long time friend Barbara Njovu and formed a music duo called Shatel. They first featured on Mondo Music's Rhythm Nation Project with a track called Niswalele in 2000. Prior to this, the duo performed at the Women in Music Talent Show in 1996 and at the International Conference for AIDS and STDs in Africa hosted in Lusaka. Through Shatel, they released several songs which hit the Zambian hit-weave in the early 2000s.

Shatel were the first Zambian artists, together with Maiko Zulu to be nominated for the Kora Awards in South Africa. Among the awards won, Shatel won the Sounds Arcades Best Selling Album for their debut album Chikondi. Ngoma Awards and Azami Awards for the best singing group.

== Political career ==
Ahead of the 2016 general election, Saboi Imboela was a member of the United Party for National Development and wanted to stand as their parliamentary candidate in Kafue constituency. However, the party adopted a different person to stand at the election in Kafue.

Imboela then joined the National Democratic Congress (NDC) in December 2017 and was selected to be the NDC's candidate for the Mayor of Lusaka by-election to be held on 26 July 2018 (after the death of incumbent mayor Wilson Kalumba), where she finished 4th in a field of 8 candidates. After that, she was appointed spokesperson of the party in April 2019.

In April 2021, the NDC had split into two factions due to a leadership dispute. One of the factions was led by Chishimba Kambwili while the other was led by Josephs Akafumba and Imboela was appointed as the vice-president of the Kambwili-led NDC faction at a convention. Within a short time, Kambwili had left the NDC in order to campaign for his former party (the Patriotic Front) ahead of the 2021 general election and so, Imboela took up the position of acting president for her faction of the NDC.

Through her time as leader of the NDC faction, she has been arrested several times for calling for reforms and changes in Zambia. She explained in 2023 that she is “not ready to stop speaking for Zambians”, after her release.

In early 2024, Imboela's faction of the National Democratic Congress was one of the founding members of the United Kwacha Alliance (UKA), an alliance of political parties in Zambia.

In November 2025, the president of the other faction of the NDC, Joseph Kasonde, had left the NDC in order to join the Citizens First party. During his resignation from the party, he handed over the party rights to the faction of Saboi Imboela, thereby rendering that the NDC no-longer has two factions. Imboela would now be legally regarded as the president of the party going forward.

On 29 April 2026, the NDC joined the Revamp for Development Change (RDC) and the Citizens First (CF) party to form the CF Orange Alliance, with Imboela among others endorsing Harry Kalaba of the CF for presidency at the 2026 general election, indicating that the NDC will not field its own presidential candidate.

== Personal life ==
Imboela lives in Lusaka. She is a mother of 3 children. She was previously married to Owas Ray Mwape. A stadium in Lusaka, Edwin Imboela Stadium, is named after her father. Her mother was Jenny Imboela.
