= UPND Alliance =

Coalition of political groups in Zambia

- Leader: Hakainde Hichilema
- Chairperson: Charles Milupi
- Founded: 14 February 2021; 5 years ago
- Ideology: Social democracy; Liberalism; Factions: African nationalism; Conservatism; Progressivism; Democratic socialism
- Political position: Centre-left; Minority: Centre-right
- Colours: Green; Red; Orange; Black (Zambian national colors)
- Slogan: “One Zambia, One Nation, One People”
- National Assembly seats: 171 / 266

The UPND Alliance is a political coalition in Zambia, formed in 2021 to consolidate opposition parties ahead of the general elections. Led by the United Party for National Development (UPND), the alliance included the Movement for Democratic Change (MDC) and the Alliance for Democracy and Development (ADD) as members at the time of the 2021 general election, with more joining afterwards. The coalition was created to unify opposition forces against the ruling Patriotic Front (PF), aiming to address Zambia's political and economic challenges.

== History ==
In late 2018, an alliance of 10 political parties in Zambia was formed, named the Opposition Alliance, with an agenda to oust the incumbent party in government (Patriotic Front) at the next election in 2021. The chairperson of the alliance was Charles Milupi, the president for the Alliance for Democracy and Development (ADD) party. The alliance also consisted of the United Party for National Development (UPND), National Democratic Congress (NDC), National Restoration Party (NAREP), United National Independence Party (UNIP), People's Alliance for Change (PAC), Patriots for Economic Progress (PeP), Republican Progressive Party (RPP), New Labour Party (NLP) and People's Party (PP).

In February 2019, PAC left the alliance. On 11 July 2019, the PeP president, Sean Tembo, decided that his party will leave the alliance. In April 2020, NAREP was removed from the alliance.

The Opposition Alliance decided in January 2021 that in all elective positions (president, mayor, member of parliament and ward councillor), they would field single candidates in the upcoming 2021 general election. The following month, the Opposition Alliance officially chose Hakainde Hichilema of the UPND to be the flag carrier of the alliance and the sole presidential candidate for the alliance at the 2021 general election, while also deciding that only the UPND will be used for candidacy identification in all elective positions. The Opposition Alliance was officially rebranded as the UPND Alliance.

In May 2021, members of The Zambia We Want Alliance decided to merge into the UPND Alliance. These include the Movement for Democratic Change (MDC), Zambia Shall Prosper Movement (ZSP), Zambians for Empowerment and Development (ZED) and Movement for Change and Equality.

The general election took place on 12 August 2021, with the UPND leader, Hakainde Hichilema winning the presidential vote to become the seventh president of Zambia. The party also won the parliamentary vote in 82 of the 156 constituencies. The following month, President Hichilema decided to add two of his alliance partners to the list of nominated members of parliament, namely the MDC president, Felix Mutati, and the UPND Alliance Chairperson and ADD president, Charles Milupi. Mutati was appointed as the Minister of Technology and Science while Milupi was appointed as the Minister of Infrastructure, Housing and Urban Development.

The Movement for Multi-Party Democracy (MMD) decided to join the alliance on 30 October 2024, effectively deciding that it will not field its own presidential candidate at the 2026 general election. The Party of National Unity and Progress (PNUP) decided to join the alliance in December 2024, also deciding that it will not field its own presidential candidate.

In December 2025, the Republican Progressive Party (RPP) president and UPND Alliance spokesperson, Leslie Chikuse, alongside the National Restoration Party (NAREP) president and alliance deputy spokesperson (Ezra Ngulube) had stated that the alliance would endorse Hakainde Hichilema again for the upcoming 2026 general election. In January 2026, the PNUP and the MDC confirmed once again that they would endorse Hakainde Hichilema for a second term at the 2026 general election while indicating that the alliance has maintained peace since the 2021 general election.

In November 2025, Joseph Kasonde, who was the mobilization chairman in the UPND Alliance, announced that the National Democratic Congress faction for which he was the president would resign from the alliance.

In June 2026, five parties joined the UPND Alliance ahead of the election, namely the United Progressive People (UPP) party led by Saviour Chishimba, the United National Independence Party led by Henry Muyoba, the New Congress Party (NCP) led by Peter Chanda, the United Prosperous and Peaceful Zambia (UPPZ) party led by Charles Chanda and the Patriotic Front led by Miles Sampa.

The election took place on 13 August 2026, with the UPND winning the presidential election and winning 137 out of 224 available elected parliamentary seats. The UPND also had to send 17 women, 12 youth and 3 differently-abled people to parliament using the mixed-member proportional representation system, with Judith Kabemba Nkonge (an alliance partner; the president of the Democratic Party) being one of the 17 women.

== Constituent parties ==
The UPND Alliance is currently composed of the following political parties:

Party	Abbreviation	Ideology
United Party for National Development	UPND	Liberalism
Party of National Unity and Progress	PNUP	Conservatism
Alliance for Democracy and Development	ADD	
Movement for Democratic Change	MDC	
Movement for Multi-Party Democracy	MMD	Social democracy
Republican Progressive Party	RPP	Progressivism
National Restoration Party	NAREP	
Democratic Party	DP	
Patiotic Front	PF	Socialism
United Prosperous and Peaceful Zambia	UPPZ	
New Congress Party	NCP	
Unite Progressive People	UPP	
United National Independence Party	UNIP	
