= Bahati (constituency) =

Zambian National Assembly constituency

Bahati is a constituency of the National Assembly of Zambia. It covers the northern part of Mansa and a rural area to the north of the city in Mansa District of Luapula Province.

== List of MPs ==
Election year	MP	Party
1973	Valentine Kayope	United National Independence Party
1978	Simon Kalaba	United National Independence Party
1983	Simon Kalaba	United National Independence Party
1988	Simon Kalaba	United National Independence Party
1991	Valentine Kayope	Movement for Multi-Party Democracy
1996	Valentine Kayope	Movement for Multi-Party Democracy
2001	Emmanuel Chungu	Movement for Multi-Party Democracy
2006	Besa Chimbaka	Patriotic Front
2011	Harry Kalaba	Patriotic Front
2016	Harry Kalaba	Patriotic Front
2019 (by-election)	Charles Chalwe	Patriotic Front
2021	Leevan Chibombwe	Patriotic Front
2026	Sydney Kaweme	National Reconciliation Party for Unity and Prosperity

== Election results ==
=== 2019 ===
Candidate	Party	Votes	%
Charles Chalwe	Patriotic Front	11,481	73.69
Justine Bwalya	United Party for National Development	2,381	15.28
Clement Mwila	United Prosperous and Peaceful Zambia	1,337	8.58
Emmanuel Chabwe	Forum for Democracy and Development	205	1.32
Isaaw Lukwesa	People's Alliance for Change	176	1.13
Total		15,580	100.00
Valid votes		15,580	97.51
Invalid/blank votes		398	2.49
Total votes		15,978	100.00
Source: Zambian Observer
