= Ministry of Health (Zambia) =

Government ministry of Zambia

- Coat of arms of Zambia

Ministry overview
- Type: Ministry
- Jurisdiction: Government of Zambia
- Headquarters: Haille Selassie Avenue Ndeke House P.O. Box 30205, Lusaka, Zambia
- Annual budget: ZMW. 4.43 billion (2016)
- Website: Homepage

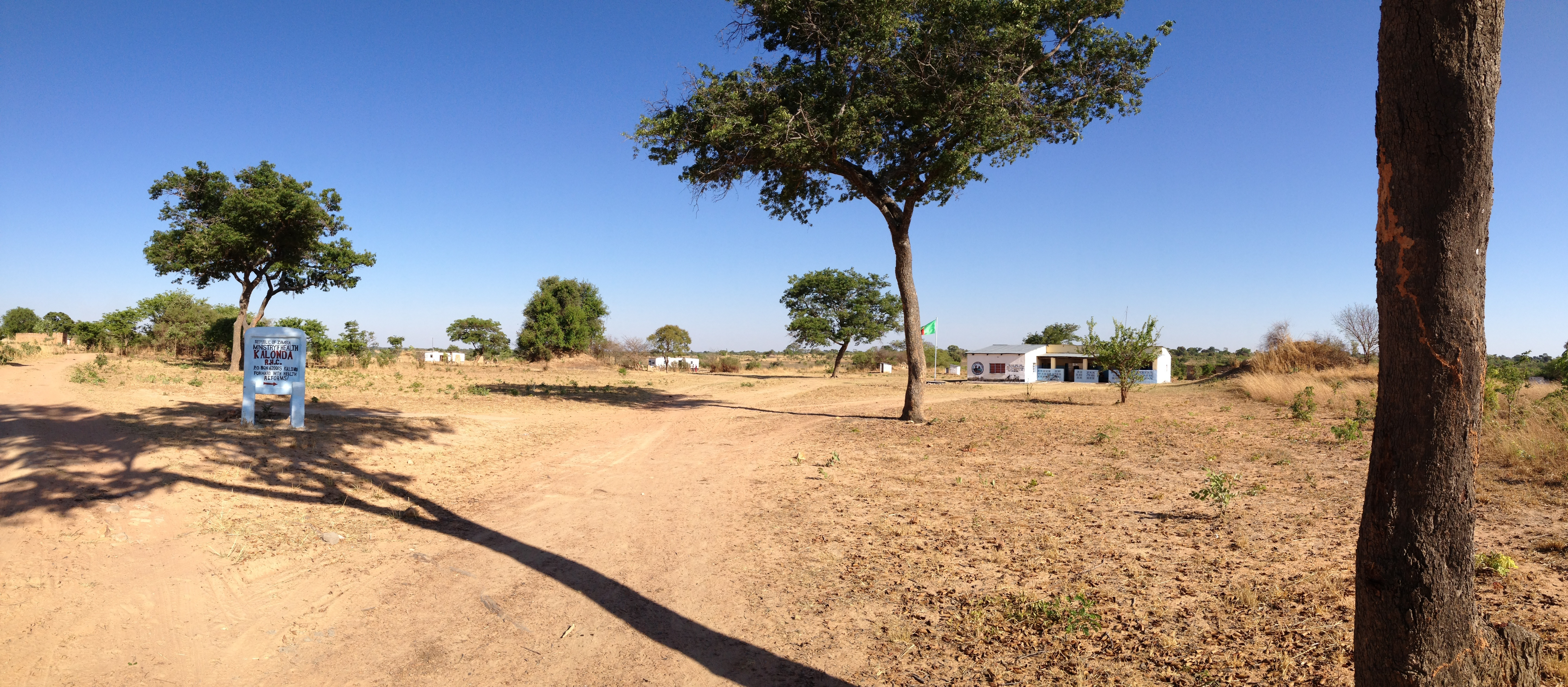
Kalonda Rural Health Centre in Kalomo District

The Ministry of Health is a ministry in Zambia. Its head offices are located in Lusaka.

== Operations ==
Subsidiary organizations include the Central Board of Health and the National Malaria Control Centre.

Healthcare facilities run by the Ministry are categorised into Urban Health Centers and Rural Health Centres (or Health Posts).

Schools operated by the Ministry include the Mansa School of Nursing in Mansa and the Ndola School of Nursing and Midwifery in Ndola District.

== List of ministers ==
Minister	Party	Term start	Term end
Member for Health and Local Government
Ewain Wilson		1949	1953
Member for Health, Lands and Local Government
John Roberts	Federal Party	1954	1956
Minister of Health
Sikota Wina	United National Independence Party	1964	1964
Munukayumbwa Sipalo	United National Independence Party	1964	
Alexander Bwalya Chikwanda	United National Independence Party	1972	
Mutumba Mainga Bull	United National Independence Party	1973	1976
Nkandu Luo	Movement for Multi-Party Democracy	1999	1999
Enoch Kavindele	Movement for Multi-Party Democracy	2000	2001
Sylvia Masebo	Movement for Multi-Party Democracy	2005	2006
Kapembwa Simbao	Movement for Multi-Party Democracy		2011
Joseph Kasonde	Patriotic Front	2011	2016
Chitalu Chilufya	Patriotic Front	2016	2021
Jonas Chanda	Patriotic Front	2021	2021
Sylvia Masebo	United Party for National Development	2021	2024
Elijah Muchima	United Party for National Development	2024	2026
Alex Katakwe	United Party for National Development	2026	2026

=== Deputy ministers ===
Deputy Minister	Party	Term start	Term end
Nkandu Luo	Movement for Multi-Party Democracy	1997	1999
Chitalu Chilufya	Patriotic Front	2015	2016
