= Nalolo (constituency) =

Constituency of the National Assembly of Zambia

Nalolo is a constituency of the National Assembly of Zambia. It covers Nalolo District in Western Province.

== List of MPs ==
Election year	MP	Party
Nalolo
1973	Mutumba Bull	United National Independence Party
1978	Mutumba Bull	United National Independence Party
1983	Amos Linyama	United National Independence Party
1984	Njekwa Anamela	United National Independence Party
1988	Njekwa Anamela	United National Independence Party
1991	Henry Kabika	Movement for Multi-Party Democracy
1996	Kasuka Mutukwa	Zambia Democratic Congress
1999	Mubita Mwangala	Zambia Democratic Congress
2001	Inonge Wina	United Party for National Development
2006	Mubita Mwangala	Movement for Multi-Party Democracy
2011	Inonge Wina	Patriotic Front
2016	George Imbuwa	Independent
2021	Imanga Wamunyima	Party of National Unity and Progress
2026	Imanga Wamunyima	United Party for National Development
