= List of mayors of Lusaka =

This is a list of mayors in the Zambian capital, Lusaka.

== List ==
=== Mayors, 1954–1982 ===
Name	Starting year of office	Ending year of office	Notes
F. Payne	1954	1955	
H. K. Mitchell	1955	1956	
Ralph Rich	1956	1957	
H. F. Tunaley	1957	1958	
H. K. Mitchell	1958	1960	
Jack Fischer	1960	1961	
Richard Sampson	1962	1963	
S. H. Chileshe	1964	1965	
W. Banda	1965	1969	
Fleefort Chirwa	1969	1971?	
Philip John Kalinda	1978	1982	

=== Governors, 1982–1991 ===
(decentralisation – one-party participatory era)

Name	Starting year of office	Ending year of office	Notes
Simon C. Mwewa	1982	1983	
Donald C. Sadoki			
Michael Sata			
Rupiah Banda			
Bautius Kapulu			
Lt. Muyoba		1991	

=== Mayors – Multi-party era, 1991–present ===
Name	Starting year of office	Ending year of office	Notes
John Chilambwe	1993	1994	
Fisho Mwale	1994	1996	
Gilbert R. Zimba	1996	1999	Local Government Administrator
Patricia Nawa			
Patrick Kangwa			
John Kabungo			
Levy Mkandawire			
Stephen Mposha			
Christine Nakazwe			
Stephen Chilatu			
Robert Chikwelete			
Daniel Chisenga			
Mulenga Sata			
Wilson Chisala Kalumba	2016	May 2018	Patriotic Front member; Died in office
Miles Sampa	July 2018	2021	Patriotic Front member
Chilando Chitangala	2021	2026	Patriotic Front member
Chitambala Mwewa	2026	Present	United Party for National Development member
