= Chanda Katotobwe =

Zambian member of parliament

Honorable Chanda Katotobwe

Elected member of the National Assembly
- In office 14 August 2021 – 15 May 2026
- Constituency: Luapula

Personal details
- Born: Chanda Augustine Katotobwe; 7 November 1968 (age 57) Zambia
- Party: Patriotic Front (2021 - 2026); Patriots for Economic Progress (2026 - present)

Chanda Augustine Katotobwe is a Zambian politician who was the member of Parliament for Luapula constituency in Lunga District of Luapula Province from 2016 to 2021. He is the current president of the Patriots for Economic Progress (PEP) political party.

== Education and personal life ==
Katotobwe holds a Bachelor of Science and a Master of Engineering in Construction Management. He is married and has four children. He is a Christian by faith and a devout member of the Catholic Church.

== Political Career ==
Katotobwe's interest in politics was inspired by his father, Augustine Bernard Chanda Katotobwe, who was an elected Member of Parliament and later Minister of State in the United National Independence Party (UNIP) government of Zambia's founding president, Dr. Kenneth Kaunda. Katotobwe was elected as the Member of Parliament for the Luapula constituency seat in the 2021 general election as the Patriotic Front candidate and the same parliamentary seat was held by his late father from 1985 until 1991, when UNIP lost elections.

On 21 March 2026, the Patriotic Front faction led by acting president Given Lubinda hosted a convention to determine the successor of the late Edgar Lungu. Chanda Katotobwe was one of the candidates and got 4.8% of the convention electorate vote, with Makebi Zulu being the chosen successor with 49.2% of the vote.

Ahead of the 2026 general election to happen in August 2026, the Patriots for Economic Progress (PEP) president, Sean Tembo, handed over the PEP presidency to Chanda Katotobwe, with Tembo opting to be the vice president of the party instead. However, upon attempting to register for the elections with the Electoral Commission of Zambia in May 2026, Katotobwe and Tembo were told that their party has organizational issues and this prevented them and other party members from being able to register, which meant that the PEP would not participate in the 2026 general election.

== Parliamentary work ==
In the Zambian Parliament, Katotobwe serves as a member of the Parliamentary Committee on Energy, Water Development and Tourism. He also serves as a member of the Parliamentary Committee on Media and Information Communication Technology. He is the Chairperson of the Zambia-Angola Parliamentary Friendship and the Chairperson of the African Parliamentary Network on Illicit Financial Flows and Taxation Zambia Caucus. Katotobwe is also a member of the Zambia-Cuba Parliamentary Friendship, the Zambia-China Parliamentary Friendship, the Zambia-Russia Parliamentary Friendship and the Zambia- Algeria Parliamentary Friendship.
