= Owas Ray Mwape =

Zambian filmmaker and actor

- Born: Owas Ray Mwape; Ndola, Zambia
- Occupations: Actor, director, producer, writer
- Years active: 1990–present
- Notable work: Suwi
- Spouse: Saboi Imboela (div)
- Awards: Best Actor

Owas Ray Mwape, is a Zambian filmmaker, actor and writer. Highly talented filmmaker, Mwape started his career as an actor and is best known for the roles in Mwansa the Great, Suwi and Fever.

== Personal life ==
He was born in Ndola. He was previously married to Zambian songstress and politician, Saboi Imboela. They later divorced where Imboela revealed domestic violence from Owas. However, Owas later denied the allegations and false rumors regarding he and Imboela.

== Career ==
Mwape has won national awards for Best Actor for three years consecutively of 1990, 1991 and 1992, becoming the only Zambian to achieve this winning streak to date. He first starred in the television serial Kabanana from 2004 to 2008. Then he made the acting appearance in several films and serials such as The Lawyer, Redbag, Complicated Affairs, Justice at Stake, The Wife, Mwansa the Great, Chidongo, The ticket, A beautiful Lie and Guilt. In 2013, he founded his own production company 'Owas Films' and turned to full time filmmaking. In 2015, he directed two films Chenda and Secrets Untold where the latter has its premier at Ster Kinekor in Lusaka.

In 2016, he directed the film Strictly By Invitation which was written by Robam Mwape and produced by Adorah Mwape. The film features the relatives and family members of Mwape family: Clive Mwape, Mercy Mwape, Prudence Mwape, Katongo Mwape, Maxwell Mwape along with Owas, Robam and Adorah.

== Filmography ==
Year	Film	Role	Genre	Ref.
2010	Suwi	Dr. Chimba	Film	
2011	Mwansa the Great	Actor, writer	Short film	
2012	Africa First: Volume Two	Mwansa (adult)	Video film	
2015	Kabanana	Chembo	TV series	
2018	Fever	Marlon	TV series	
