= Mansa East =

National Assembly constituency in Zambia

Mansa East is a constituency of the National Assembly of Zambia. It was created in 2026 when Mansa Central was split into two constituencies (Mansa East and Mansa West). It covers the south-eastern part of Mansa District.

== List of MPs ==
| Election year | MP | Party |
|---|---|---|
| 2026 | Webby Simwayi | National Reconciliation Party for Unity and Prosperity |
