= Sean Tembo =

Zambian politician (born 1980)

Sean Enoch Tembo
- Born: Sean Enoch Tembo; 30 March 1980 (age 46); Chipata, Eastern Province
- Education: The Copperbelt University; University of Derby
- Occupations: Entrepreneur, Politician
- Organization: Enosyst Associates
- Political party: Patriots for Economic Progress (2016 - 2026)
- Spouse: Lorrita Kabwe
- Children: 5

Sean Enoch Tembo (born 30 March 1980) is a Zambian politician, certified accountant and former president of the Patriots For Economic Progress political party. He participated in the 2021 presidential elections where he came out number thirteen out of sixteen candidates with a total of 1,813 votes representing 0.04%.

== Early life and career ==
Tembo was born in 1980 in Chipata's Jabu Village in the Eastern Province of Zambia. He attended his primary school in Lusaka at Chitukuko Primary School and his junior secondary education in Lusaka at Kabulonga School and completed his senior secondary school education in 1997 at Hillcrest Technical Secondary School in Livingstone. He is a holder of a bachelor's degree in Accountancy obtained from the Copperbelt University He is also a holder of a master's degree in Business Administration obtained from University of Derby. He is the founder of Enosyst Associates, an audit & business advisory services firm. He has also served as Assistant Superintendent of the Zambia Police Service. Tembo is the founder of the Patriots for Economic Progress (PEP) political party, having registered it in 2016.

As the PEP president, Sean Tembo decided to join the Opposition Alliance in 2018 and was appointed as the spokesperson of the alliance. However, on 11 July 2019, Tembo decided that his party should leave the alliance due to disagreements.

As the PEP president, Sean Tembo decided to join the United Kwacha Alliance (UKA), an alliance of political parties, in May 2024. He then joined the Tonse Alliance in September 2024 and was appointed as the spokesperson of the alliance. Due to the United Kwacha Alliance (UKA) not being in support of a political party belonging to more than one alliance, it was decided that Tembo and his party (PEP) are no-longer part of UKA.

On 7 January 2026, Sean Tembo decided that his Patriots for Economic Progress (PEP) party will resign from being part of the Tonse Alliance due to disagreements.

Ahead of the 2026 general election, Sean Tembo decided to adopt Chanda Katotobwe to be the presidential candidate for PEP, with Tembo opting to be the vice president of the party instead. However, upon attempting to register for the elections with the Electoral Commission of Zambia, Katotobwe and Tembo were told that their party has organizational issues and this prevented them and other party members from being able to register. Sean Tembo proceeded to stand as an independent parliamentary candidate in Roma constituency in Lusaka District at the election, prompting him to resign from being a member of PEP.

Following the 2026 election, where he finished third in the parliamentary election in Roma constituency, Mr. Tembo announced his retirement from active politics. Tembo, who founded the Patriots for Economic Progress (PEP), said he would no longer take an active role in politics.

== Personal life ==
Tembo is married to Lorrita Kabwe, a Consultant Cardiologist at the University Teaching Hospital.
