= Chitalu Chilufya =

Zambian physician and politician

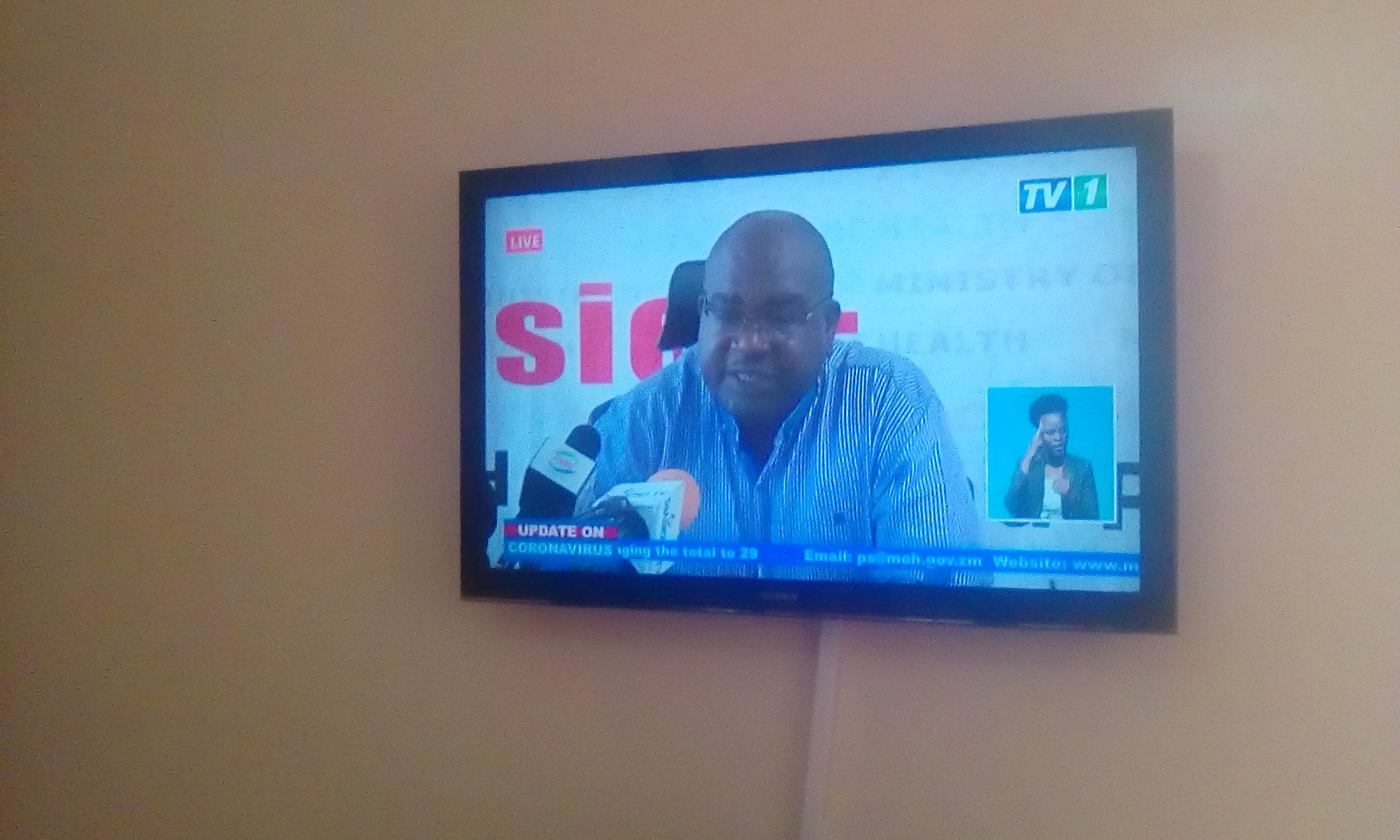
- Chitalu Chilufya in March 2020.

Minister of Health
- In office August 2016 – January 2021
- President: Edgar Lungu
- Preceded by: Joseph Kasonde
- Succeeded by: Jonas Chanda

Member of the National Assembly for Mansa West
- Incumbent
- Assumed office August 2026
- Preceded by: Seat created

Deputy Minister of Health
- In office 2015–2016

Member of the National Assembly for Mansa Central
- In office 23 November 2013 – 15 May 2026
- Preceded by: Kennedy Sakeni

Personal details
- Born: 15 July 1972 (age 54) Zambia
- Party: Patriotic Front
- Occupation: Physician

Chitalu Chilufya (born 15 July 1972) is a Zambian physician and politician who currently serves as the Mansa West member of parliament. He was the Member of the National Assembly for Mansa Central from November 2013 to May 2026. He was Minister of Health from August 2016 to January 2021.

== Biography ==
=== Early life and medical career ===
Chilufya grew up in the Kaunda Square area of Lusaka. He studied medicine at the University of Zambia and worked as a physician. Before entering politics, Chilufya worked in Zambia's public health system in both clinical and administrative roles. In 2004, he served as Medical Superintendent, and later as director of the Namwala District Health Department. Afterwards, he worked as a clinical care specialist and later as Head of Clinical Care and Quality Assurance through the USAID-funded Zambia Systems Strengthening Integrated Programme.

=== Early political career ===
He was chosen as the Movement for Multi-Party Democracy candidate to contest for the Mansa Central parliamentary seat in the 2011 general elections. However, he was defeated by Kennedy Sakeni of the Patriotic Front. Sakeni died in 2013 and Chilufya was adopted as the Patriotic Front candidate for the subsequent by-election, despite the party having labelled him as a thief in the 2011 election campaign, and was elected to the National Assembly with an 8,392-vote majority.

=== Minister of Health ===
In February 2015 he was appointed Deputy Minister of Health by President Edgar Lungu. After retaining his seat in the 2016 general election, he was promoted to Minister of Health by President Lungu. He was dismissed as Minister of Health in January 2021. He retained the Mansa Central parliamentary seat in the 2021 general election as the Patriotic Front (PF) candidate. Zambia's Ministry of Health pursued policies aligned with universal health coverage during this period, prioritising primary health care as the main vehicle of service delivery.

=== Patriotic Front race ===
In late 2022, Chilufya was one of the members who applied to be a candidate in a proposed convention in which the successor of Edgar Lungu (who decided to retire) for the Patriotic Front presidency would be chosen. Lungu was given back the title of PF president in October 2023, putting a halt to any plans for a convention.

On 15 March 2026, Given Lubinda (who had been the acting president of a faction of the PF since Lungu passed away in June 2025) announced that after many delays, his PF faction would host a convention to choose their new leader within four days. The convention took place virtually on 21 March 2026 and the delegates that were present elected Makebi Zulu to be the president of the party faction with 49.2% of the vote, with Chitalu Chilufya getting 34.1% of the vote.

=== 2026 general election ===
In April 2026, Chilufya decided to associate with the PF faction where Miles Sampa was the party president and Sampa decided that Chilufya should be the PF presidential candidate at the 2026 general election to happen in August that year. Chilufya accepted the nomination. However, on 18 May 2026, Sampa had made a public announcement stating that the Patriotic Front will withdraw its presidential candidate and not participate in the 2026 general election. The next day, Chilufya withdrew his intentions to stand as the Patriotic Front presidential candidate, stating that the party was still going through legal challenges. Chilufya proceeded to stand as an independent MP candidate in the newly-created Mansa West constituency (which is a division of Mansa Central, where he was previously the MP) while Sampa withdrew his intentions of being a member of parliament, which meant that the Patriotic Front would not field any candidate at any local government level at the 2026 general election. Chitalu Chilufya proceeded to officially resign from the Patriotic Front party in order to complete his independent candidature in Mansa West. At the election, Chilufya was elected as the Mansa West MP.

== Personal life ==
Chilufya is married with two children.
