= National Restoration Party =

National Restoration Party may refer to:

- National Restoration Party (Costa Rica)
- National Restoration Party (Peru)
- National Restoration Party (Zambia)
