= Mansa Central =

Constituency of the National Assembly of Zambia

Mansa Central was a constituency of the National Assembly of Zambia. It covered the southern part of Mansa and a rural area to the south of the city in Mansa District of Luapula Province.

== List of MPs ==
| Election year | MP | Party |
Mansa
| 1964 | Lewis Changufu | United National Independence Party |
| 1968 | Lewis Changufu | United National Independence Party |
| 1973 | Stalin Kaushi | United National Independence Party |
| 1978 | Wilson Chakulya | United National Independence Party |
| 1983 | Edward Chinungu | United National Independence Party |
| 1988 | Mwenaboyi Kaimbi | United National Independence Party |
| 1991 | Edward Chisha | Movement for Multi-Party Democracy |
| 1996 | Kelvin Mwitwa | Movement for Multi-Party Democracy |
| 2001 | Justin Chilufya | Movement for Multi-Party Democracy |
| 2006 | Chrispine Musosha | Movement for Multi-Party Democracy |
Mansa Central
| 2011 | Kennedy Sakeni | Patriotic Front |
| 2013 (by-election) | Chitalu Chilufya | Patriotic Front |
| 2016 | Chitalu Chilufya | Patriotic Front |
| 2021 | Chitalu Chilufya | Patriotic Front |
Seat abolished (split into Mansa West and Mansa East)
