= Makeni (constituency) =

National Assembly constituency in Zambia

Makeni is a constituency of the National Assembly of Zambia. It was created in 2026 by splitting Kanyama constituency. It covers the south-western part of Lusaka in Lusaka District, including the suburb of Makeni and the townships of John Laing and Chibolya.

== List of MPs ==
Election year	MP	Party
2026	Beene Hachoombwa	United Party for National Development
