= Matero (constituency) =

Constituency of the National Assembly of Zambia

Matero is a constituency of the National Assembly of Zambia. It covers part of the north-western section of Lusaka in Lusaka District, including the suburb of Matero.

== List of MPs ==
Election year	MP	Party
1973	Lombe Chibesakunda	United National Independence Party
1978	Francis Nkhoma	United National Independence Party
1983	Felix Chanda	United National Independence Party
1988	Abel Mkandawire	United National Independence Party
1991	Samuel Miyanda	Movement for Multi-Party Democracy
1996	Samuel Miyanda	Movement for Multi-Party Democracy
2001	Chance Kabaghe	Forum for Democracy and Development
2006	Faustina Bwalya	Patriotic Front
2011	Miles Sampa	Patriotic Front
2016	Lloyd Kaziya	Patriotic Front
2021	Miles Sampa	Patriotic Front
2026	Alexander Sakala	United Party for National Development
