= Charles Chanda =

Zambian politician

- Born: February 9, 1968 (age 58); Zambia
- Occupation: Politician

Charles Chanda (born 9 February 1968) is a Zambian politician and businessman. He is the president of the United, Prosperous and Peaceful Zambia (UPPZ) political party.

== Political Career ==
Charles Chanda was the United, Prosperous and Peaceful Zambia (UPPZ) presidential candidate at the 2021 general election, where he finished eighth in a field of sixteen candidates with 0.13% of the vote.

He applied to be the UPPZ presidential candidate at the 2026 general election but he was denied in May 2026 due to an alleged issue of moral bankruptcy, which meant that the party wouldn't field a presidential candidate. The following month, the UPPZ party decided to join the UPND Alliance and endorse the incumbent head of state, Hakainde Hichilema of the United Party for National Development (UPND), for re-election.

== Land sale controversies ==
In 2019, Chanda and his company Brook Cherith Estate Agents were sued by 120 plaintiffs, who alleged that Chanda had attempted to fraudulently sell plots of land that he did not own. He and his daughter, Esther, were subsequently charged with 134 counts of fraud, and in 2023, he was acquitted on 127 counts.
