= Leevan Chibombwe =

Zambian politician, Member of Parliament for Bahati

Member of the National Assembly of Zambia for Bahati
- Incumbent
- Assumed office 12 August 2021

Personal details
- Party: Patriotic Front
- Profession: Electrical Technician, Politician

Leevan Chibombwe (born 4 March 1978) is a Zambian politician and electrical technician who currently serves as the Member of Parliament (MP) for the Bahati constituency, a position he assumed following the 2021 general election.

== Early life ==
Chibombwe was born on 4 March 1978. He holds a Grade 12 certificate and an Advanced Certificate as an Electrical Technician. He is professionally experienced in electrical installation and maintenance.

== Political career ==
In the 2021 general elections, Chibombwe was elected MP for the Bahati constituency on the Patriotic Front roll.

As a backbench MP, he has served on the Committee on Local Government Accounts and the Committee on Health, Community Development and Social Services.

Chibombwe has also been active in promoting gender equality and youth participation, including encouraging girls from his constituency to pursue football careers, coinciding with the U17 national team trials.

== Electoral incident ==
In February 2025, Chibombwe was arrested in connection with electoral violations during the Kawambwa Central by-election nomination process. He faced charges including acts intended to cause grievous harm, which related to an alleged incident involving a police officer.
