= National Democratic Congress (Zambia) =

Political party in Zambia

The National Democratic Congress (NDC) is a political party in Zambia. It was formed by former Information minister Chishimba Kambwili after he was fired from the ruling Patriotic Front by President Edgar Lungu in 2017.

== History ==
Kambwili had been a fierce critic of President Lungu since he was relieved off his duties in 2017. In 2018, the NDC was banned from holding public meetings and Kambwili was arrested for inciting public violence. In late 2018, the NDC became a member of the Opposition Alliance.

In April 2021, there was a leadership dispute between Chishimba Kambwili and Josephs Akafumba which had split the NDC into two party factions. Chishimba Kambwili remained the president of one faction and Josephs Akafumba became the president of the other faction. Saboi Imboela (who had been the NDC spokesperson since April 2019) was appointed as the vice-president of the Kambwili-led NDC faction at a convention. Within a short time, Kambwili had left the NDC in order to campaign for his former party (the Patriotic Front) ahead of the 2021 general election and so, Imboela took up the position of acting president for her faction of the NDC.

The NDC faction led by Josephs Akafumba remained a member of the Opposition Alliance, which got renamed to the UPND Alliance in February 2021. The alliance members all endorsed Hakainde Hichilema of the United Party for National Development for presidency in the 2021 general election, together with endorsing UPND to field all elective positions for that election, which meant that the NDC itself would not take part in the election.

After the UPND won the 2021 general election, President Hakainde Hichilema decided to appoint Josephs Akafumba as the Permanent Secretary for the Ministry of Home Affairs. Akafumba accepted the role, which meant that he automatically stepped down from being the president of his NDC faction. Mwenya Musenge (a former secretary-general of the party) assumed the role of party president that month. In March 2022, Musenge was removed from his position as party president by the party's council and replaced by George Sichula for the interim. In November 2023, Sichula was appointed as the trade and economic secretary at the Zambia High Commission in Nigeria and therefore handed over the interim party presidency to Sam Nyirenda. In early 2025, it was reported that Joseph Kasonde was the party president.

In early 2024, the NDC faction led by Saboi Imboela was one of the political parties that founded the United Kwacha Alliance (UKA), an alliance of political parties.

In November 2025, Joseph Kasonde, who was the mobilization chairman in the UPND Alliance, had left the NDC in order to join the Citizens First party led by Harry Kalaba. During his resignation from the party, he handed over the party presidency to Saboi Imboela, thereby rendering that the NDC no-longer has two factions. Imboela would now be legally regarded as the president of the party going forward.

After this party leadership matter was resolved, the NDC decided to participate in the 2026 Chawama by-election by fielding a candidate by the name of James Phiri. He finished ninth out of the nine candidates that participated.

On 29 April 2026, the NDC joined the Revamp for Development Change (RDC) and the Citizens First (CF) party to form the CF Orange Alliance and endorse Harry Kalaba of the CF for presidency at the 2026 general election, indicating that the NDC will not field its own presidential candidate.
