= Musola Cathrine Kaseketi =

Zambian filmmaker

- Born: October 1968 (age 57–58); Solwezi, Zambia
- Education: Columbia University's School of International and Public Affairs
- Occupation: Film director
- Notable work: Suwi

Musola Cathrine Kaseketi (born 1968) is a Zambian filmmaker and human rights activist. She is Zambia's first female professional film director.

== Early life and education ==
Kaseketi was born in October 1968 in Solwezi, but spent most of her early life in Kabwe due to a government relocation policy. As a young child, a medical error by a student nurse paralysed one of her legs; she has mobility difficulties as a result. She trained as a tailor and designer before moving to Zimbabwe to study theatre. She subsequently graduated cum laude from Newtown Film and Television School in South Africa.

In later life she studied for qualifications in America and Europe, including courses with the Columbia University's School of International and Public Affairs and training as a disability equality facilitator with the International Labour Organization.

== Film career ==
Her first film, Suwi ("Faith"), which she wrote, directed and produced, was released in 2009, and was screened in several European countries as well as South Africa. She has directed episodes of the Zambian soap opera Kabanana, as well as numerous documentaries. She is the founder of Vilole Images, a nonprofit foundation which educates young Zambian filmmakers. To date, she has directed three feature-length films: Suwi, Dreams of Forgotten Youth (2012) and Broken Hill Man (2013), as well as a student film, Making a Difference in Life (1999). She also founded Zambia's first international film festival, Shungu Namutitima ("Smoke That Thunders").

Kaseketi is the Zambia and South Africa coordinator of ArtWatch International, and chairs the Zambia Society for Cinematographers.

== Human rights work ==
Shortly after the release of Suwi, Kaseketi was approached by a group of disabled women who had been inspired by the film. With them, she set up the Pachibwanse Corner, or Women's Meeting Place, a project to develop a village community and improve the lives of women with disabilities. Many of her films and documentaries address the social issues affecting disabled women.
