= Lima (constituency) =

National Assembly constituency in Zambia

Lima is a constituency of the National Assembly of Zambia. It was created in 2026 by splitting Matero constituency. It covers Lima and Mwembeshi in the north-western part of Lusaka in Lusaka District.

== List of MPs ==
Election year	MP	Party
2026	Kelvin Kaunda	National Reconciliation Party for Unity and Prosperity
