= Chishala Kateka =

Zambian politician

President of the New Heritage Party
- Incumbent
- Assumed office 2020

Personal details
- Born: Zambia
- Party: New Heritage Party
- Education: University of Zambia

Chishala Kateka (born 30 June 1956) is a Zambian Economist, Fellow Chartered Accountant, politician and leader of the New Heritage Party. In 2021, she contested for the Presidency of the Republic of Zambia. Previously, she was board chairperson of Barclays Bank and Competition Commission becoming the first female Zambian to lead the two Boards. She has also represented the African Jurisdiction on the International Ethics Board of Accountants (IESBA).

== Education and banking career ==
Kateka graduated with a bachelor's degree in economics from the University of Zambia in 1979. Before that, in 1990, she qualified as a member of the Chartered Association of Certified Accountants. She has been in charge of audits for a number of financial institutions, including Bank of Botswana. She has also worked outside the banking sector and was until May 2001 interim manager for Kafue Textiles of Zambia and a principal consultant for the World Bank on the Copperbelt Economic Diversification Workshop Project.

In 2002, she became the coordinator of the National Economic Diversification Programme in Zambia, a project co-funded by the World Bank and the Zambian government. Kateka was later appointed principal consultant for the World Bank on the 2002 Consultative Group meeting in Livingstone.

== Political career ==
Kateka joined active politics in 2020 and relaunched the New Heritage Party previously led by general Godfrey Miyanda. The following year, she contested in the 2021 general election vying to become President of Zambia. She finished seventh in a field of 16 candidates with 0.16% of the vote and Hakainde Hichilema was elected.

Kateka then became a fierce critic of the administration of Hichilema, often detailing the issues Zambians continue to face under his leadership. In 2022, she condemned the US army presence in Zambia, saying Zambia must not be allowed to become a colonized state again.
