= Mansa West =

National Assembly constituency in Zambia

Mansa West is a constituency of the National Assembly of Zambia. It was created in 2026 when Mansa Central was split into two constituencies (Mansa East and Mansa West). It covers the south-western part of Mansa District, including the town centre of Mansa.

== List of MPs ==
Election year	MP	Party
Mansa West
2026	Chitalu Chilufya	Independent
