= Party of National Unity and Progress =

- Abbreviation: PNUP
- Leader: Highvie Hamududu
- Founded: 2 May 2017
- Split from: United Party for National Development
- Ideology: Conservatism
- Political position: Centre-right
- National affiliation: UPND Alliance
- Colours: Orange
- Slogan: Together We Stand
- National Assembly: 1 / 156

Election symbol
- Wheel

Website
- Facebook group

The Party of National Unity and Progress (PNUP) is a political party in Zambia. The party was originally launched in Lusaka on 2 May 2017 as the Party of National Unity (PNU), but later relaunched and rebranded under its current name in January 2021.

The party is led by economist Highvie Hamududu. In the 2021 Zambian general election, PNUP won a single seat in the National Assembly in the constituency of Nalolo, with Imanga Wamunyima in the seat.

In December 2024, the PNUP joined the UPND Alliance, thereby deciding that it will not field its own candidate at the 2026 general election and will endorse Hakainde Hichilema of the United Party for National Development for that position.

== Electoral history ==
=== Presidential elections ===
Election	Party candidate	Votes	%	Result
2021	Highvie Hamududu	10,480	0.22%	Lost ✗

=== National Assembly elections ===
Election	Votes	%	Seats	+/–	Position	Outcome
2021	13,178	0.27%	1 / 156	New	▲5th	Opposition
