= 2008 Zambian presidential election =

- 30 October 2008
- Registered: 3,944,135
- Turnout: 44.83% (▼24.69 pp)
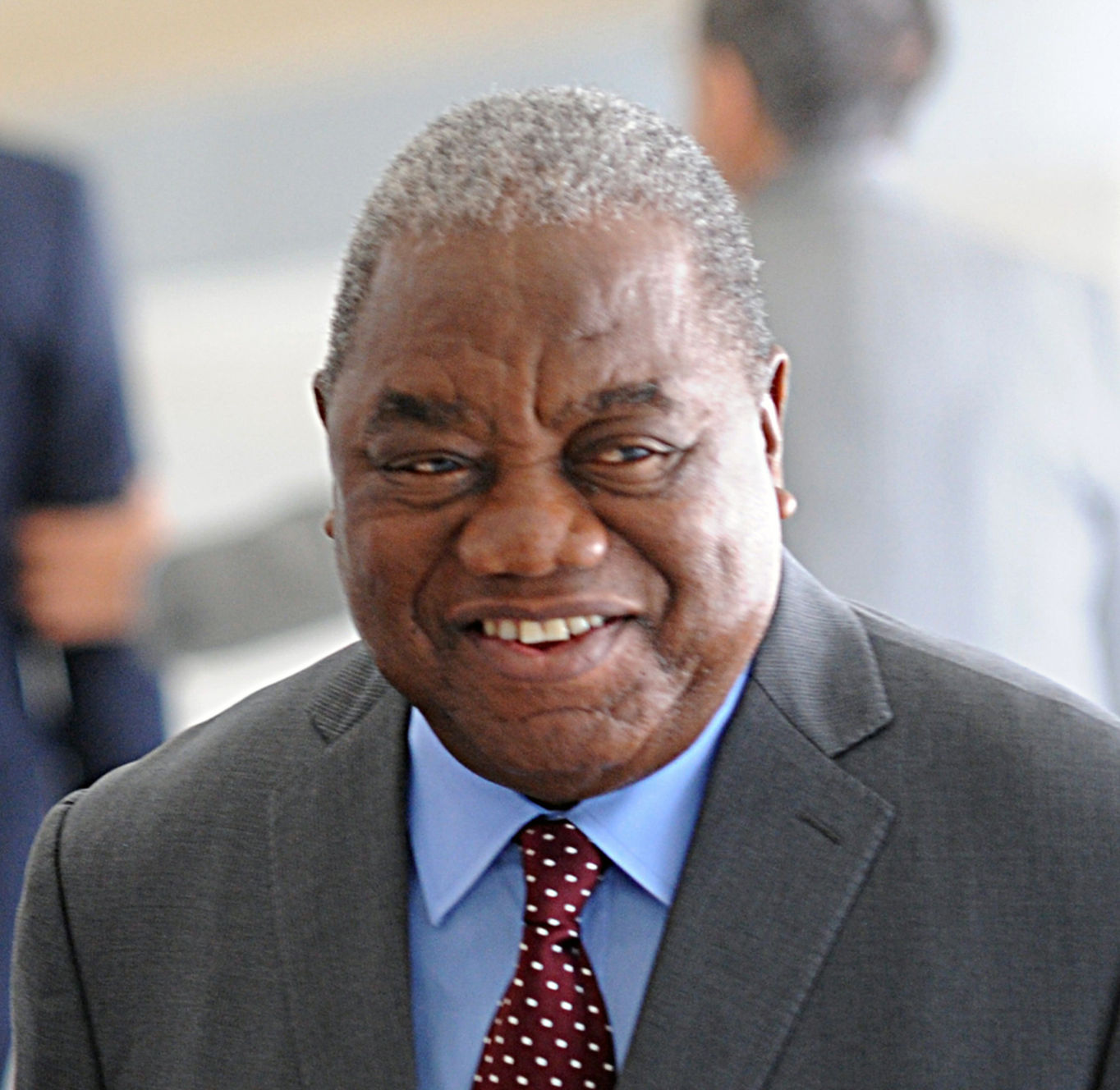

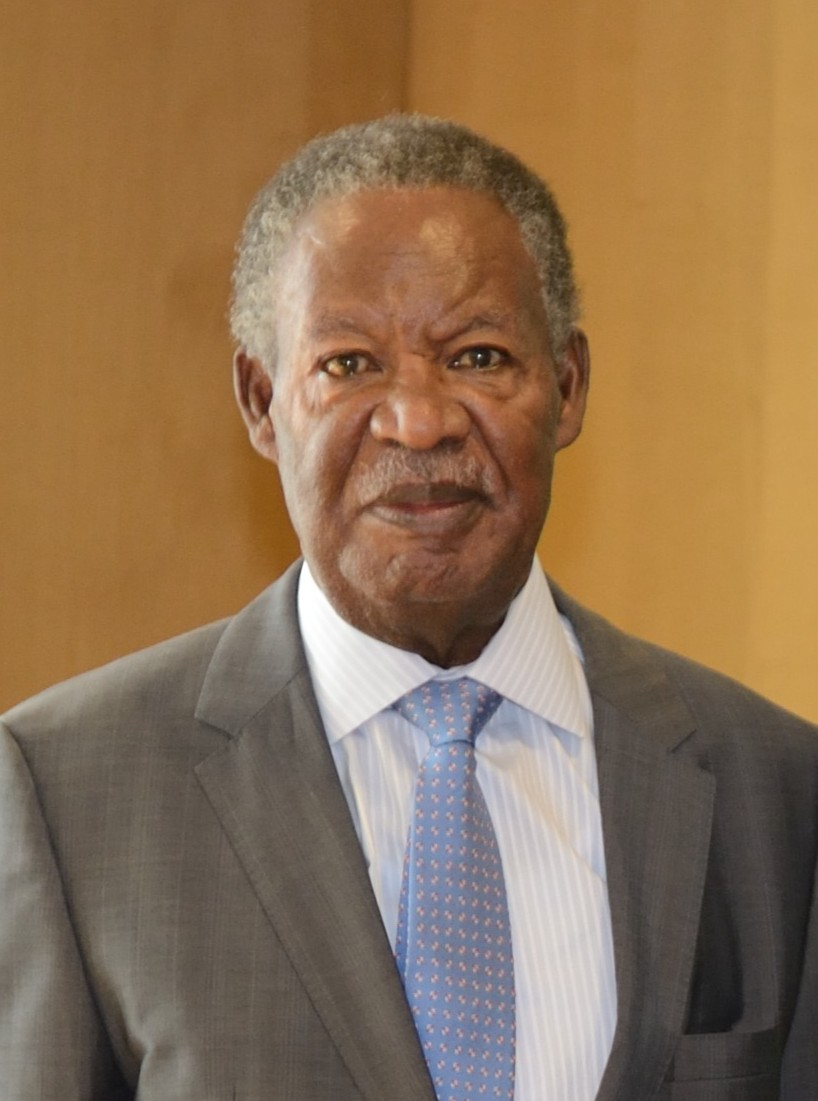

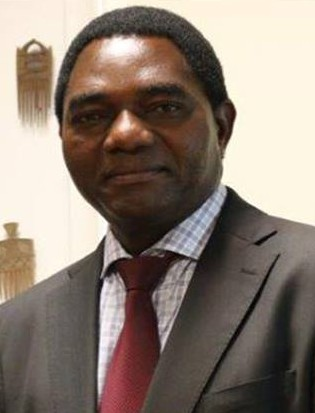
Nominee	Rupiah Banda	Michael Sata	Hakainde Hichilema
Party	MMD	PF	UPND
Popular vote	718,359	683,150	353,018
Percentage	40.63%	38.64%	19.96%
- Presidential results by National Assembly constituency
President before election
Rupiah Banda (acting)
MMD
Elected President
Rupiah Banda
MMD

Presidential elections were held in Zambia on 30 October 2008 following the death of the incumbent President Levy Mwanawasa on 19 August 2008, as the elections had to be called within 90 days of his death. It was expected that there would be internal problems within the ruling Movement for Multi-Party Democracy (MMD) as Mwanawasa had not declared a successor prior to his death, but Acting President Rupiah Banda was selected as the MMD's candidate without apparent problems. Michael Sata stood as the candidate of the Patriotic Front (PF), while Hakainde Hichilema stood as the candidate of the United Party for National Development (UPND). Godfrey Miyanda stood as the candidate of the Heritage Party.

The elections were held to determine who should serve out the remainder of Mwanawasa's presidential term, which ended in 2011, rather than for a full five-year term. The elections were decided in a single round on a first-past-the-post basis.

Final results were announced on 2 November 2008, giving Banda the victory with 40.6% of the vote against 38.6% for Sata. Banda was promptly sworn in on the same day.

== Background ==
Following Mwanawasa's death, some questioned whether it would be financially possible for the Electoral Commission of Zambia to hold the elections within the designated timeframe. It was also suggested that it would be necessary to hold the election without updating the voters' roll, but using an outdated voters' roll could cause complications during an election. The Electoral Commission decided to use the voters' roll from the 2006 elections due to lack of time. A group called Anti-Vote Rigging, which was aligned with the opposition, took the matter to the High Court, seeking a decision that would force the Electoral Commission to "register new voters ahead of the elections because most people will be defranchised". The High Court ruled on 14 October that it was acceptable to use the old voters' roll due to time constraints.

At a press conference on 5 September, Sata demanded that a date for the elections be announced. Acting President Rupiah Banda announced on 9 September that the elections would be held on 30 October 2008.

The Electoral Commission set a budget of 240 billion kwacha (about US$75 million) for the elections, and the United Nations Development Programme said that it would contribute US$11.5 million. By 9 September, many provinces had received electoral materials being distributed by the Electoral Commission.

The Electoral Commission printed 600,000 more ballot papers than needed, saying that they would be used as substitute ballots in case of voter mistakes. The opposition objected to the printing of the extra ballot papers, arguing that they could facilitate vote rigging and calling for them to be destroyed. The Electoral Commission asked the four presidential candidates to attend a meeting on 15 October to discuss the issue. In response to allegations from the opposition that there were plans to rig the elections in Banda's favour, Florence Mumba, the Chairperson of the Electoral Commission, said on 22 October that the commission was committed to "a credible and acceptable" election and that any complaints regarding the elections would be investigated.

== Campaign ==
On 27 September 2008, Chief Justice Ernest Sakala announced that four candidates had validly filed and would stand in the elections; Banda for the MMD, Sata for the PF, Hichilema for the UPND, and Miyanda for the Heritage Party. Banda and Sata were considered the frontrunners. Two opinion polls conducted before the elections showed Sata in the lead; one of them was conducted by the Kenya-based Steadman Group, and it showed Sata with 40% support and Banda with 29% support. The MMD released a poll on 29 October that placed Banda's support at 42–46% and Sata's support at 31–35%.

=== MMD ===
Acting President Rupiah Banda, who succeeded Mwanawasa due to his position as vice-president, was the MMD candidate.

There were initially disagreements in the MMD regarding the party's presidential candidate. The party's Chairman for Information and Publicity, Benny Tetamashimba, argued that Rupiah Banda should be the candidate in an interview on 24 August. He claimed wide support for this in the party and praised Banda's "high leadership qualities". On the same day, however, Northern Province Minister Lameck Chibombamilimo argued in favour of Mwanawasa's wife, Maureen Mwanawasa, becoming the MMD candidate. According to Chibombamilimo, "her developmental work scattered throughout the country and her leadership at the continental level where she has led her fellow first ladies in the fight against HIV/AIDS" demonstrated that she had the ability to serve as president. Banda filed his application to run as the party's candidate on 26 August. The MMD in Eastern Province issued a statement supporting his candidacy, and politicians such as Vernon Mwaanga and Mbita Chitala also stated their support; according to Chitala, Banda had the support of most members of the MMD National Executive Committee. Finance Minister Ng'andu Magande also applied to be the MMD's candidate on 25 August, saying that he was "eminently qualified" because he had "rich experience in managing state operations both internationally and locally". Former vice-president Enoch Kavindele and former Minister of Works and Supply Ludwig Sondashi also applied. Katele Kalumba and Michael Mabenga did not apply; Tetamashimba praised their decision, saying that it would "enhance unity in the party".

Sondashi called for the MMD candidate to be decided through secret voting, while Southern Province Minister Daniel Munkombwe called for the candidate to be decided at a party convention and not a meeting of the National Executive Committee, as a convention would allow broader participation in the process. According to Munkombwe, Mwanawasa was nearly beaten by Anderson Masoka in the 2001 presidential election because he had been essentially "handpicked" by the MMD National Executive Committee.

It was reported on 31 August that thirteen politicians had filed to run as the MMD's candidate: Maxwell Mwamba, Pastor Nyirongo, former vice-president Enoch Kavindele, Acting President Rupiah Banda, former vice-president Nevers Mumba, Home Affairs Minister Ronnie Shikapwasha, MMD Chairperson for Commerce and Trade Sebastian Kopulande, Finance Minister Ng'andu Magande, Charles Ngesa, Billy Phiri, Martin Chama, former Constitution Review Commission (CRC) chairperson Wila Mung'omba and former Works and Supply Minister Ludwig Sondashi. Ultimately there were 19 candidates.

The MMD National Executive Committee chose Rupiah Banda as the party's presidential candidate in a secret ballot on 5 September 2008. He had been widely expected to win, and he received 47 votes against 11 for Magande. On this occasion, Banda promised to "unite the party and the entire nation" and to "continue implementing [Mwanawasa's] programs", while expressing gratitude for the support he had received. Magande's unsuccessful candidacy was said to have been favoured by Maureen Mwanawasa.

Two smaller parties, the United Liberal Party and the All People's Congress, chose to support Banda's candidacy.

Banda launched his campaign on 18 September. On this occasion, he praised Mwanawasa's liberal economic policies, saying that they had "made us one of the most stable countries on the African continent", and he promised to continue those policies if he was elected. Shortly before the elections, he announced a 75% reduction in the price of fertilizer; this was considered a populist move intended to buttress his rural support.

Speaking on 24 October, Independence Day, Banda said that the country could "look to the future with hope because even when prophets of doom were predicting chaos following the death of Mwanawasa, Zambians were united in ensuring that the due process of the law is observed as we prepare for his successor". He called for a high turnout in the elections.

In reaction to Sata's statement that he would reject the results if he lost, Banda urged his opponents to accept the results on 27 October, warning that anyone who incited violence in the wake of the elections could face arrest.

=== PF ===
Michael Sata, the leader of the opposition Patriotic Front, stood as the PF candidate in the elections. He was unanimously chosen as the party's candidate at a meeting of its Central Committee on 30 August 2008. Accepting the nomination, he expressed the need "to scrub this country and wash it"; he also said that he would refrain from campaigning until after Mwanawasa's funeral. Although he suffered a heart attack in April 2008, Sata said that he was healthy and in good condition. He said on 8 September that he would protect Chinese investments if he was elected, abandoning the hostility towards Chinese investment that he had expressed during the 2006 presidential election campaign.

On 15 October, Sata said that, if elected, he would require foreign investors to reserve at least 25% of the shares in their companies for Zambians, with the penalty of losing their licenses if they did not do so. Sata also said that he would reduce taxes on government employees and improve housing, rural industries, and agriculture.

Prior to the elections, Sata stated that he would not accept the results if they showed that he was defeated, believing that he could not legitimately lose. Supporters of Sata in Livingstone set up a roadblock on 28 October to halt trucks that they believed might be transporting pre-marked ballots from South Africa into the country through Zimbabwe; they were dispersed by police with tear gas. The Electoral Commission said that the trucks only contained lamps and batteries. At his last rally of the campaign, held in Lusaka on 29 October, Sata denied that he was seeking to incite unrest, but he remained unwilling to state ahead of time that he would accept the results.

There were some concerns about Sata's health; although he appeared vigorous in the period leading up to the elections, he suffered a heart attack in April 2008 and had to be evacuated to South Africa.

=== UPND ===
The PF and United Party for National Development were reportedly in talks over an electoral pact in August. However, the UPND decided to contest the elections alone, with UPND leader Hakainde Hichilema as the party's candidate. Hichilema promised free health care for all citizens, free primary and secondary education, and improved housing. Some commentators felt he was too young and inexperienced for the presidency, and the UPND was criticised as a tribally-based party. Hichilema said before the elections that if electoral fraud occurred, there would be "severe consequences".

=== UNIP ===
United National Independence Party (UNIP) Deputy Secretary-General Alfred Banda said that UNIP would contest the elections with Tilyenji Kaunda as its candidate, according to The Post on 26 August. UNIP's Information and Publicity Secretary for Copperbelt Province, Brian Chishimba, had previously said that the party would not present a candidate due to internal disagreements, but Alfred Banda dismissed this statement. However, UNIP ultimately did not present a candidate in the elections.

== Conduct ==
The South African Development Community (SADC), the African Union and the European Union were invited to send election observers. The EU did not send observers due to the tight timeframe.

Voting began at 6:00 in the morning on 30 October, and was scheduled to end 12 hours later. Sata voted in central Lusaka and "emphatically" reiterated that he would not accept a victory for Banda, saying that there was "no way MMD can win". He also alleged that the Electoral Commission and the police were working together to rig the elections. An apparent attempt at fraud was reported in Lusaka, where an election officer was arrested after he was found carrying an envelope containing ballots that were pre-marked in favour of Banda.

Catholic priest Frank Bwalya was arrested on 12 November and charged with incitement of violence based on a broadcast on Radio Icengelo, which discussed matters related to the elections; he was arrested after refusing to halt the broadcast. In response to the arrest, PF supporters in Kitwe protested violently; they were dispersed with tear gas and 38 people were arrested on 13 November. Bwalya was released on bail on the same day.

== Results ==
According to early results from 19 of the 150 constituencies on 31 October, Sata had 60% of the vote and Banda had almost 31%. Later in the day, results from 43 constituencies showed Sata leading with 50.6% to Banda's 33.8%. The early results were mainly from urban constituencies, where the PF enjoyed strong support; the MMD's support was primarily based in rural areas. As voting continued on 31 October, results from 60 constituencies gave Sata a smaller lead: 43.8% against Banda's 34.1%. Hichilema, meanwhile, had 13.8%, and Miyanda had 0.6%. With results from 93 constituencies counted, Sata had 41% to Banda's 37%, with Hichilema at 20%. According to the Electoral Commission and African Union observers, voting went well and there were no major problems. An MMD prediction on television that Banda would defeat Sata by a 60,000 vote margin led the PF to allege that the prediction was part of an effort to manipulate the results.

Early on 1 November, results from 102 constituencies showed Sata still narrowly ahead with 40% against 38% for Banda. As votes continued to be counted, results from 108 constituencies placed Sata at 39.8%, Banda at 37.9%, Hichilema at 20.3%, and Miyanda at 0.8%. Results from the afternoon, with 137 constituencies counted, showed Sata leading with 39.9% to Banda's 39.1%, while Hichilema had 19% and Miyanda had 0.7%. The PF asked for vote counting to be stopped to allow for an investigation into irregularities. On the same day, the SADC observer mission endorsed the elections as "credible, peaceful, well-managed and transparent". Results from the evening of 1 November, with 148 constituencies counted, showed Banda leading with 40.0% to Sata's 38.5%, Hichilema at 19.5% and Miyanda at 0.8%. Complaining of irregularities, the PF did not accept the results and stated that it would go to the courts to seek a recount. Final results were announced on 2 November 2008, confirming Banda's victory with 40.6% of the vote against 38.6% for Sata. Banda was promptly sworn in at State House on the same day, using his speech on the occasion to call for unity. Turnout was placed at 45%; the use of the outdated voters roll reportedly reduced participation, as some people were unable to vote.

When Banda overtook Sata in the results, Sata's supporters in parts of Lusaka began rioting on 1 November, and riots also broke out in Kitwe on the next day. The Foundation for Democratic Process, a non-governmental organization that conducted its own vote count, said that its results matched the results given by the Electoral Commission. The PF said on 3 November that it wanted a recount, subject to independent verification, to be held in 78 constituencies. Hichilema alleged fraud as well, but he said that he did not plan to present a legal challenge to the results. Speaking on South African radio on 4 November, Sata denied that he had been defeated and stated: "Rupiah Banda has no vision, Rupiah Banda has no platform. The only platform Rupiah Banda is on is cheating." On 5 November, the Electoral Commission said that only a verification exercise, not a recount, would be conducted. It said that the verification exercise was a matter of standard procedure, but that a recount would require a court order. Within two days, the verification exercise was suspended in Lusaka after a physical altercation between members of the MMD and the PF. A member of the MMD alleged that Sata punched him during this brawl, but the PF disputed the claim.

Candidate	Party	Votes	%
Rupiah Banda	Movement for Multi-Party Democracy	718,359	40.63
Michael Sata	Patriotic Front	683,150	38.64
Hakainde Hichilema	United Party for National Development	353,018	19.96
Godfrey Miyanda	Heritage Party	13,683	0.77
Total		1,768,210	100.00
Valid votes		1,768,210	98.68
Invalid/blank votes		23,596	1.32
Total votes		1,791,806	100.00
Registered voters/turnout		3,944,135	45.43
Source: Electoral Commission

== Aftermath ==
In a cabinet reshuffle on 14 November, Banda dismissed five ministers. He appointed George Kunda as vice president and chose Situmbeko Musokotwane to replace Finance Minister Ng'andu Magande.
