= UPND Youth League =

Youth wing of the United Party for National Development

United Party for National Development Youth League
- Chairperson: Gilbert Liswaniso
- Founded: 1998
- Headquarters: Lusaka, Lusaka Province
- Mother party: United Party for National Development
- International affiliation: International Union of Socialist Youth (IUSY); World Federation of Democratic Youth (WFDY)
- Magazine: Youth People
- Website: www.upndzambia.org

The United Party for National Development Youth League (UPNDYL) is the youth wing of the United Party for National Development, a major political party in Zambia. Established as a platform to engage the nation's youth in political activism and leadership, the UPND Youth League plays a vital role in promoting the party’s ideologies of social and economic liberalism among young Zambians.

== Formation ==
The Youth League was formed to help mobilise youths towards, the values, beliefs and principles of the UPND, the governing political party in Zambia.

The Youth League was formed by the youth members of the party to spearhead the issues faced by young people in Zambia. Among them was the 4-month closure of the Copperbelt University which the Zambian Education minister had closed following student protests.
