= Roma (constituency) =

National Assembly constituency in Zambia

Roma is a constituency of the National Assembly of Zambia. It was created in 2026. It covers the Ngombe, Northmead, Kalundu, Kalingalinga, Roma and Olympia Park neighbourhoods of Lusaka in Lusaka District.

== List of MPs ==
Election year	MP	Party
2026	Ross Kasikili	United Party for National Development
