= Frank Bwalya =

Zambian politician

Frank Bwalya is a former Zambian Roman Catholic priest now working for the Patriotic Front after the death of its founder Michael Sata.

He has held positions as chairperson for Broadcasting for the Media Institute of Southern Africa - Zambia for 2007–2008, and he worked for Radio Icengelo in 2007.

He has had a number of brushes with the law, after suggesting that the presidential election was fraudulent.

He was arrested in March 2010 and charged with conduct likely to cause a breach of peace during a rally held to mark youth day in Kitwe north of the capital Lusaka.

Bwalya flashed a card painted red when he joined the celebrations - which police said signified a call to remove the government. He pleaded not guilty and was released on bail.
