= Joseph Kasonde =

Zambian politician

Dr Joseph Kasonde
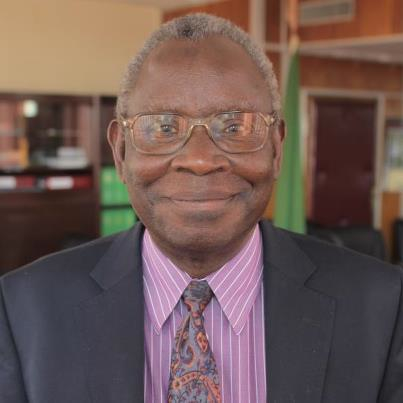

Minister of Health
- In office October 2011 – 14 September 2016
- President: Michael Sata (2011–14); Edgar Lungu (2015–)
- Preceded by: Kapembwa Simbao
- Succeeded by: Chitalu Chilufya

Personal details
- Born: 30 January 1938 Mazabuka, Southern Province, Zambia
- Died: 25 August 2017 (aged 79) University Teaching Hospital, Lusaka, Zambia.
- Party: Patriotic Front
- Spouse: Mary Chazi Kasonde
- Education: University of Aberdeen (MB ChB)
- Profession: Medical doctor

Joseph Mwenya Kasonde was a Zambian politician who served as the Minister of Health from October 2011 to 2016.

== Early life and career ==
Kasonde was a Zambian physician who served as Minister of Health from 2011 to 2016. While serving as minister, he championed pharmaceutical policy and access to medicines issues, contributing to the re-establishment of Medical Stores Limited, the largest medicines storage and distribution facility in the Southern African Region. He was a founding member of the Lusaka Apex Medical University (LAMU), an institution established as a result of evidence on the magnitude of the human resources for health crisis in Zambia and Africa. LAMU saw the first privately trained Zambian doctors and pharmacists graduating in 2015 and 2016 respectively.

Kasonde was a graduate of the University of Aberdeen, Scotland and Fellow of the Royal College of Obstetricians and Gynecologists, London. He completed his PhD at the University of Oxford, and served as Research Fellow with the University of Oxford Department of Obstetrics and Gynecology. He was Chair of the Board of the Tropical Diseases Research Centre in Ndola, Zambia, a precursor to the establishment of the Africa Centre for Disease Control (CDC) Regional Office in Zambia. At WHO HQ in Geneva, he served as Responsible Officer for Research Capacity Strengthening in the Special Programme of Research, Development and Research Training in Human Reproduction. After retiring, he joined the Council on Health Research for Development (COHRED) which led to the establishment of the Zambia Forum for Health Research. At the 2013 Global Symposium on Health Systems Research (HSR) he presented the Roles of WHO in assisting country-based knowledge translation platforms (KTP) to develop context specific evidence-informed policies.

In 2013, Kasonde was awarded The Harvard Ministerial Leadership Award, a joint initiative of Harvard with support from the Bill & Melinda Gates Foundation, Bloomberg Philanthropies, the GE Foundation, and the Rockefeller Foundation. In 2016, the President of the Republic of Zambia presented Kasonde with a lifetime achievement award on behalf of the Zambia Medical Association (ZMA) for his service to medicine in Zambia and globally. In 2018, the ZMA introduced the Joseph Mwenya Kasonde Research Award. [END]

Kasonde died on 25 August 2017 after having suffering with liver cancer for some time.

President Edgar Chagwa Lungu declared a day of national morning and accorded Kasonde a state funeral in recognition of his lifetime dedication and commitment to serving the people of Zambia.
