= Godfrey Miyanda =

Zambian politician

Brigadier General Godfrey Miyanda

5th Vice-President of Zambia
- In office 4 July 1994 – 2 December 1997
- President: Frederick Chiluba
- Preceded by: Levy Mwanawasa
- Succeeded by: Christon Tembo

Personal details
- Born: 4 December 1944 (age 81) Kitwe, Northern Rhodesia (now Zambia)
- Party: Heritage Party
- Other political affiliations: Movement for Multi-Party Democracy

Godfrey Miyanda (born 4 December 1944) is a Zambian politician and former military figure. In 1993, he served as the fifth vice-president of Zambia under Frederick Chiluba's administration.

== Early life ==
Miyanda begun his early schooling in Kitwe at Kitwe Main School. He later attended Buseko and Kawama Primary schools in Kitwe. He later attended Katete and Munali secondary schools up to form five. He also attended a one year part-time course in Business Management at Evelyn Hone College of Higher Education.

== Career ==
Miyanda was a career soldier. He attended an officers course at Mons Officer Cadet School in Aldershot, England. He did further training at Hythe in Kent and another course at Warminster in England. He attended a Staff Officers course in Canada in 1968.

Miyanda has attended several leadership courses and programmes. He has held several positions in the Army, including Platoon Commander, Emplaning, Intelligence Officer, Adjutant, Battalion Second-In-Command, Battalion Commander, General Staff Officer Grade One, and Colonel General Staff at Army Headquarters. His last position in the Army was Chief of Logistics. Miyanda established the Zambia Military Academy, being its first head at Kohima Barracks based in Kabwe, Central Province. His contemporaries in military training include General Kingsley Chinkuli, Zambia's first black army chief, General Benjamin Mibenge, late Colonel Patrick Kafumukache, late General Christon Tembo, former Zambian vice president.

He is a trained Caterpillar salesman, having attended intensive earth-moving science and sales courses in Nairobi, Kenya and Malaga, Spain. He learnt to operate most Caterpillar earth moving equipment. He is also a qualified Public Service Vehicle Driver. In 1980, Miyanda was dismissed from the army by Kenneth Kaunda for involvement an alleged coup plot. He was blacklisted for many years and drove a taxi cab. He was subsequently cleared of all the charges.

== Political career ==
He joined the growing opposition to Kenneth Kaunda and was later one of the senior members of the Movement for Multi-Party Democracy (MMD). He subsequently served under President Frederick Chiluba as Minister without Portfolio and National Secretary of the MMD until 1995. In 1993, after the resignation of Levy Mwanawasa, Miyanda was appointed as Vice President. At the 1995 MMD party convention he was elected the party's vice president. In 1997, he was demoted to the post of Minister of Education, although he remained the vice president of the MMD.

Miyanda was expelled from the MMD, together with twenty-two senior party officials, in May 2001 for opposing President Chiluba's third presidential term bid.

=== Heritage Party ===
Miyanda went on to form the Heritage Party in Zambia. It was formed after his expulsion from the Movement for Multi-Party Democracy (MMD) in May 2001 for opposing the third term bid for president. At the 2001 general election, the party won four parliamentary seats in a unicameral Zambian parliament. However, the four members of parliament were included by the then Zambian president Levy Mwanawasa in government ministerial positions. In the next election in 2006, the four members joined then MMD party and the Heritage Party did not win any seats in parliament.

Miyanda can be described as a perennial candidate. He unsuccessfully ran for president five times (2001, 2006, 2008, 2011 and 2015). After those losses, and parliamentary losses, he closed down the Heritage Party after the 2015 Zambian presidential election.

== Sunset years ==
In January 2023, Miyanda indicated that he had no desire to return to politics. In November 2023 he headed an electoral observer mission to Madagascar.

Political offices
Preceded by Levy Mwanawasa	Vice-President of Zambia; 1994–1997	Succeeded by Christon Tembo
