= Suwi =

Zambian 2010 drama film

- Directed by: Musola Cathrine Kaseketi
- Written by: Musola Cathrine Kaseketi
- Starring: Catherine Soko; Chantel Mwabi; Owas Ray Mwape; Jacob Chirwa
- Release date: 2010
- Country: Zambia

Suwi is a 2010 Zambian film written and directed by Musola Cathrine Kaseketi and co-directed by Sandie Banda.

== Plot ==
The movie gives insight of a young lady who had accident leaving her to be handicapped, she later found love with a person living with AIDS of which made her happy.

== Cast ==
- Catherine Soko
- Chantel Mwabi
- Owas Ray Mwape
- Jacob Chirwa
- Charity Chanda Mwamba
- Emmanuel Chishimba
- Mrs. Chishimba
- Kangwa Chileshe
- Chenayi Moyo
- Emma Mukwasa
- Boyd Nyirenda
- Masuthu Kalinda
- Felix Kalima
- Melisa Wakoli
- Sharon-Rose Wakoli
