= Elias Chipimo Jr =

Elias Chipimo Jnr

Personal details
- Born: September 1965 (age 60)
- Party: National Restoration Party
- Profession: Lawyer, Investor and former leader of political party

Elias Chipimo Jr. (born September 1965) is a retired Zambian politician and was the president of the National Restoration Party. He resigned from the party on 2 September 2019. He previously worked as a corporate lawyer and human rights activist.

== Personal History ==
Chipimo is the third boy in a family of seven. He grew up in Lusaka, but also lived in the United Kingdom, where his father served as a diplomat in the late 1960s. Chipimo's father (and namesake) made a speech to the Law Association of Zambia in 1980 which marked the start of his confrontation with the leadership of the ruling UNIP led by Kenneth Kaunda.

== Professional career ==
Chipimo, a Rhodes Scholar, graduated from Oxford with the Bachelor of Civil Law in 1990. Before going into politics, Chipimo was Managing Partner and Senior partner, responsible for corporate advisory work, mergers, acquisitions, investments and privatisations. His main area of work is corporate law, principally advisory work on mergers and acquisitions, privatisation and capital markets related work in Zambia as well as within the Southern African region.

== Philosophy ==
Chipimo in 2010 established the National Restoration Party (Www.newzambia.org)a political party that aims to encourage every Zambian to take more of a measure of responsibility and better manage the five important areas that underpin personal responsibility: managing time; living up to our commitments; vision and planning; fact-based rather than emotional driven decision-making; greater independence in thought and action. Chipimo has published a book based on his opinion of the leadership in Zambia and the current state of the nation. The book, titled “Unequal to the Task?”, is available in bookstores around Zambia and also available online at www.newzambia.org.
