= Kaumbwe =

Constituency of the National Assembly of Zambia

Kaumbwe is a constituency of the National Assembly of Zambia. It was named Kapoche until being renamed in 2016, and covers the southern part of Petauke District in Eastern Province.

== List of MPs ==
Election year	MP	Party
Kapoche
1973	Josiah Kanyuka	United National Independence Party
1978	Ben Zulu	United National Independence Party
1983	Ben Zulu	United National Independence Party
1988	Ben Zulu	United National Independence Party
1991	Ben Zulu	United National Independence Party
1996	Alfred Chioza	Movement for Multi-Party Democracy
2001	Charles Banda	Forum for Democracy and Development
2006	Nicholas Banda	Movement for Multi-Party Democracy
2011	Nicholas Banda	Movement for Multi-Party Democracy
Kaumbwe
2016	Listed Tembo	Patriotic Front
2021	Aaron Daniel Mwanza	Patriotic Front
2026	Charles Tembo	Independent
