= New Heritage Party =

Political party in Zambia

- Abbreviation: NHP
- Leader: Chishala Kateka
- Founder: Godfrey Miyanda
- Founded: 2001, 2020
- Headquarters: Lusaka
- Ideology: Zambian nationalism National conservatism Economic nationalism Communitarianism; Liberalism
- Political position: Right-wing
- Slogan: Our Land, Our Prosperity

Website
- newheritageparty.org

The New Heritage Party is a political party in Zambia. Founded in 2001 as the Heritage Party, it was shut down after the 2015 presidential by-election, but was revived by Chishala Kateka in 2020 as the New Heritage Party.

== History ==
The party was formed in 2001 by Godfrey Miyanda after he left the Movement for Multi-Party Democracy over President Frederick Chiluba's plans to run for a third term in office. In the December 2001 general elections Miyanda stood as the party's presidential candidate, finishing fifth in a field of eleven candidates with 8% of the vote. The party also received 8% of the vote in the National Assembly elections, winning four seats.

In the 2006 elections Miyanda was the party's presidential candidate again, but saw his vote share fall to 1.6%; in the National Assembly elections the party's vote share was reduced to 1.3% and it lost all four seats. Miyanda stood for president again in 2008, but received less than 0.8% of the vote, finishing last amongst the four candidates.

The 2011 general elections saw Miyanda's share of the presidential vote reduced to 0.2%, whilst the party received just 485 votes in the National Assembly elections (0.02%). Miyanda ran for a fifth time in the 2015 presidential elections, finishing eighth in a field of eleven candidates with 0.3% of the vote.

In 2020, Chishala Kateka, founding member and chairperson of the finance committee for the original Heritage Party, revived the party as the New Heritage Party in her bid for the presidency. She said that the new party had gone beyond the old Heritage manifesto, and had their own. The party participated in the 2021 general election, with Kateka finishing seventh in a field of 16 candidates with 0.16% of the vote.

In early 2024, the New Heritage Party joined the United Kwacha Alliance, an alliance of political parties. In December 2025, the New Heritage Party joined the We Are One Zambia Alliance (WOZA), an alliance of political parties. On 5 May 2026, WOZA merged into the Tonse Alliance.

== Electoral history ==
=== Presidential elections ===
Election	Party candidate	Votes	%	Result
2001	Godfrey Miyanda	140,678	8.09%	Lost ✗
2006	Godfrey Miyanda	42,891	1.57%	Lost ✗
2008	Godfrey Miyanda	13,683	0.76%	Lost ✗
2011	Godfrey Miyanda	4,730	0.17%	Lost ✗
2015	Godfrey Miyanda	5,757	0.34%	Lost ✗
2016	Did not take part			
2021	Chishala Kateka	8,169	0.17%	Lost ✗

=== National Assembly elections ===
Election	Party leader	Votes	%	Seats	+/–	Outcome
2001	Godfrey Miyanda	132,311	7.55%	4 / 159	▲4	Opposition
2006	Godfrey Miyanda	34,872	1.29%	0 / 159	▼4	Extra-parliamentary
2011	Godfrey Miyanda	485	0.02%	0 / 159	Steady	Extra-parliamentary
2016	Did not take part					
2021	Chishala Kateka	1,762	0.04%	0 / 167	Steady	Extra-parliamentary
