= Harry Kalaba =

Zambian politician (born 1976)

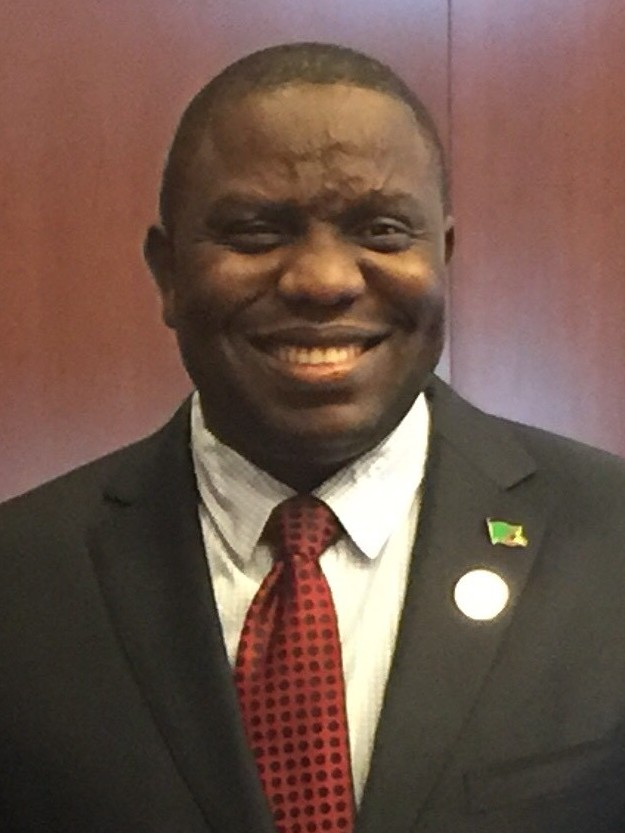
- Kalaba in 2017

25th Minister of Foreign Affairs
- In office March 2014 – January 2018
- President: Michael Sata (2014); Edgar Lungu (2015–)
- Preceded by: Wylbur Simuusa
- Succeeded by: Joseph Malanji

Personal details
- Born: 12 June 1976 (age 50) Mansa, Zambia
- Party: Citizens First (2022–present)
- Other political affiliations: Democratic Party (2019–2022); Patriotic Front (2011–2019)
- Spouse: Irene Kalaba
- Children: 3

Harry Kalaba (born 12 June 1976) is a Zambian politician and the current president for the Citizens First Party. He had served as Minister of Foreign Affairs of Zambia from March 2014 to January 2018. He is a former member of Patriotic Front. He served as the Member of Parliament for Bahati from August 2011 to January 2019.

After leaving the Patriotic Front party in 2019, he was chosen to stand as the presidential candidate at the 2021 Zambian general election for the Democratic Party. In July 2022, he left the Democratic Party after several issues and in October 2022, he became the president of the newly-created Citizens First Party.

== Political career ==
Harry Kalaba stood as the Patriotic Front candidate in Bahati constituency at the 2011 general election and was elected as a member of parliament. In August 2012, President Michael Sata appointed Kalaba as the deputy minister in the Office of the Vice-President.

On 12 September 2013, Kalaba was appointed as the Minister of Lands and Natural Resources. On 11 March 2014, Sata moved Kalaba to being the Minister of Foreign Affairs. After Edgar Lungu became the head of state in January 2015, he retained Kalaba as the Foreign Affairs Minister.

At the 2016 general election, Kalaba was re-elected as the Bahati constituency member of parliament. President Lungu retained Harry Kalaba as the Foreign Affairs Minister. However, in January 2018, Kalaba resigned from his position as Foreign Affairs Minister. In January 2019, Kalaba was expelled from the Patriotic Front party and he proceeded to resign from being the member of parliament for Bahati constituency.

Kalaba was invited to be the president of the Democratic Party shortly before his resignation as a member of parliament and he accepted the position. He was the presidential candidate of the party at the 2021 general election, where he finished third with 0.52% of the vote.

In July 2022, he left the Democratic Party after several issues and in October 2022, he formed the Citizens First (CF) party for which he would be the president.

In early 2024, the Citizens First party joined the United Kwacha Alliance, which was an alliance of political parties. However, party president Kalaba announced the departure of the party from the alliance on 23 April 2025.

On 29 April 2026, the National Democratic Congress (NDC) led by Saboi Imboela and the Revamp for Development Change (RDC) led by Robert Chansa joined the Citizens First (CF) party to form the CF Orange Alliance and endorse Harry Kalaba for presidency at the 2026 general election. On 19 May 2026, Kalaba announced that Moses Mawere will be his running mate (vice president) at the 2026 general election. However, in July 2026, Mawere endorsed a different presidential candidate instead of Kalaba but he would remain the official running mate for Kalaba at the election.

== See also ==
- List of foreign ministers in 2017
