= Mansa District, Zambia =

Coordinates: 11°30′S 29°00′E

Mansa District
- District
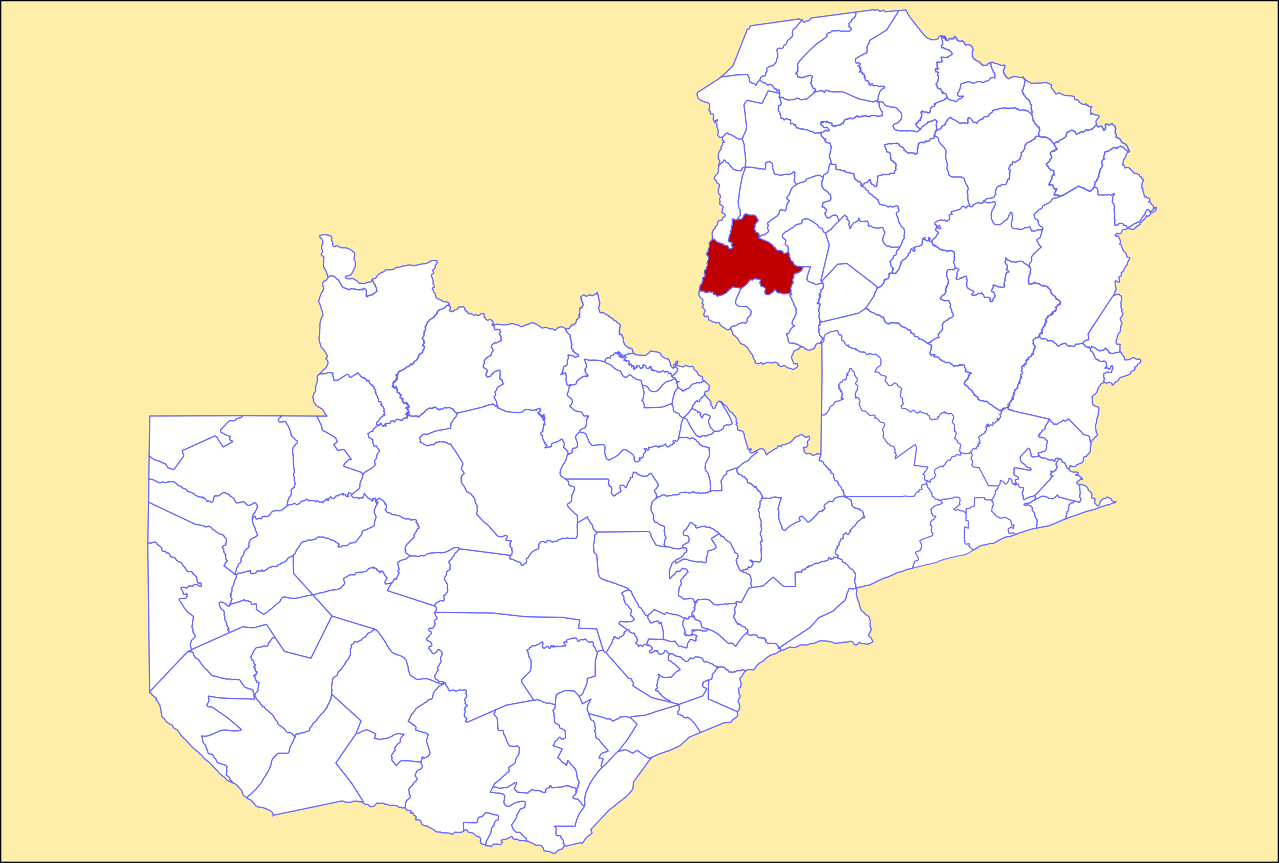
- District location in Zambia
- Country: Zambia
- Province: Luapula Province
- Capital: Mansa

Area
  - Total: 7,775.7 km^{2} (3,002.2 sq mi)

Population (2022)
  - Total: 327,063
  - Density: 42.062/km^{2} (108.94/sq mi)
- Time zone: UTC+2 (CAT)

Mansa District with headquarters at Mansa is a district located in Luapula Province. As of the 2022 Zambian Census, the district had a population of 327,063 people. It consists of two constituencies, namely Mansa Central and Bahati.
