= National Restoration Party (Zambia) =

Political party in Zambia

- Abbreviation: NAREP
- Leader: Ezra Tikwiza Ngulube
- Founded: March 2010
- Headquarters: 43 Nalikwanda Road, Woodlands, Lusaka
- Ideology: Anti-communism; Conservatism; Democratic capitalism Economic liberalism
- Political position: Right-wing
- National affiliation: UPND Alliance
- Colours: Orange; Green; Black; Red
- Slogan: A heart for the people

Website
- newzambia.org

The National Restoration Party (NAREP) is a political party in Zambia. It is one of the parties in the UPND Alliance.

== History ==
NAREP was established in March 2010 by Elias Chipimo Jr. Chipimo was the party's presidential candidate in the 2011 general elections, finishing fifth in a field of ten candidates with 0.4% of the vote. In the National Assembly elections the party received 0.2% of the vote and failed to win a seat.

Chipimo ran again in the 2015 presidential by-election, finishing seventh out of the eleven candidates with 0.4% of the vote.

In 2019, Chipimo retired from his position as leader of NAREP, and was replaced by Muvi TV owner Steven Nyirenda.

In 2018, NAREP joined the Opposition Alliance, which later became the UPND Alliance. NAREP eventually exited the alliance before participating in the 2021 general election, where Steven Nyirenda finished fourteenth in a field of sixteen candidates with 0.04% of the vote.

NAREP later rejoined the UPND Alliance, with party president Ezra Ngulube endorsing Hakainde Hichilema of the United Party for National Development for the presidency in the 2026 general election, indicating that NAREP will not field its own presidential candidate.
