= Lazarus Chisela =

Zambian politician

- Occupation: Politician

Lazarus Chisela is a Zambian politician. He is the president for the Zambia United for Sustainable Development (ZUSD) political party.
