= Andyford Banda =

Zambian politician

- Occupation: Politician

Andyford Banda is a Zambian politician. He is the President for the People's Alliance for Change (PAC) party.

== Allegations ==
Banda has faced allegations of corruption and abuse of power, which he has denied.
