= Democratic Party (Zambia) =

- Abbreviation: DP
- Leader: Judith Phiri-Nkonge
- Founded: 1991
- Ideology: Liberal democracy
- Political position: Centre-left
- Colours: Pink; Beige
- Slogan: Let's Believe Again!
- National Assembly: 0 / 156

Election symbol
- Key

The Democratic Party is a political party in Zambia. The party was launched in 1991.

Its current leader is Judith Phiri-Nkonge. Before October 2022, the leader was Harry Kalaba, who was adopted in November 2018 as the party's candidate for president in the 2021 Zambian general election. Prior to Harry Kalaba being appointed, the party's president was Gift Kalumba.

== Electoral history ==
=== Presidential elections ===
Election	Party candidate	Votes	%	Result
2021	Harry Kalaba	25,231	0.52%	Lost ✗

=== National Assembly elections ===
Election	Votes	%	Seats	+/–	Position	Outcome
1991	120	0.01	0 / 159	0	▲5th	Extra-parliamentary
2001	115	0.01	0 / 156	0	▼16th	Extra-parliamentary
2021	50,886	1.05	0 / 167	0	▲4th	Extra-parliamentary
