= Lusaka District =

Coordinates: 15°25′S 29°00′E

- District
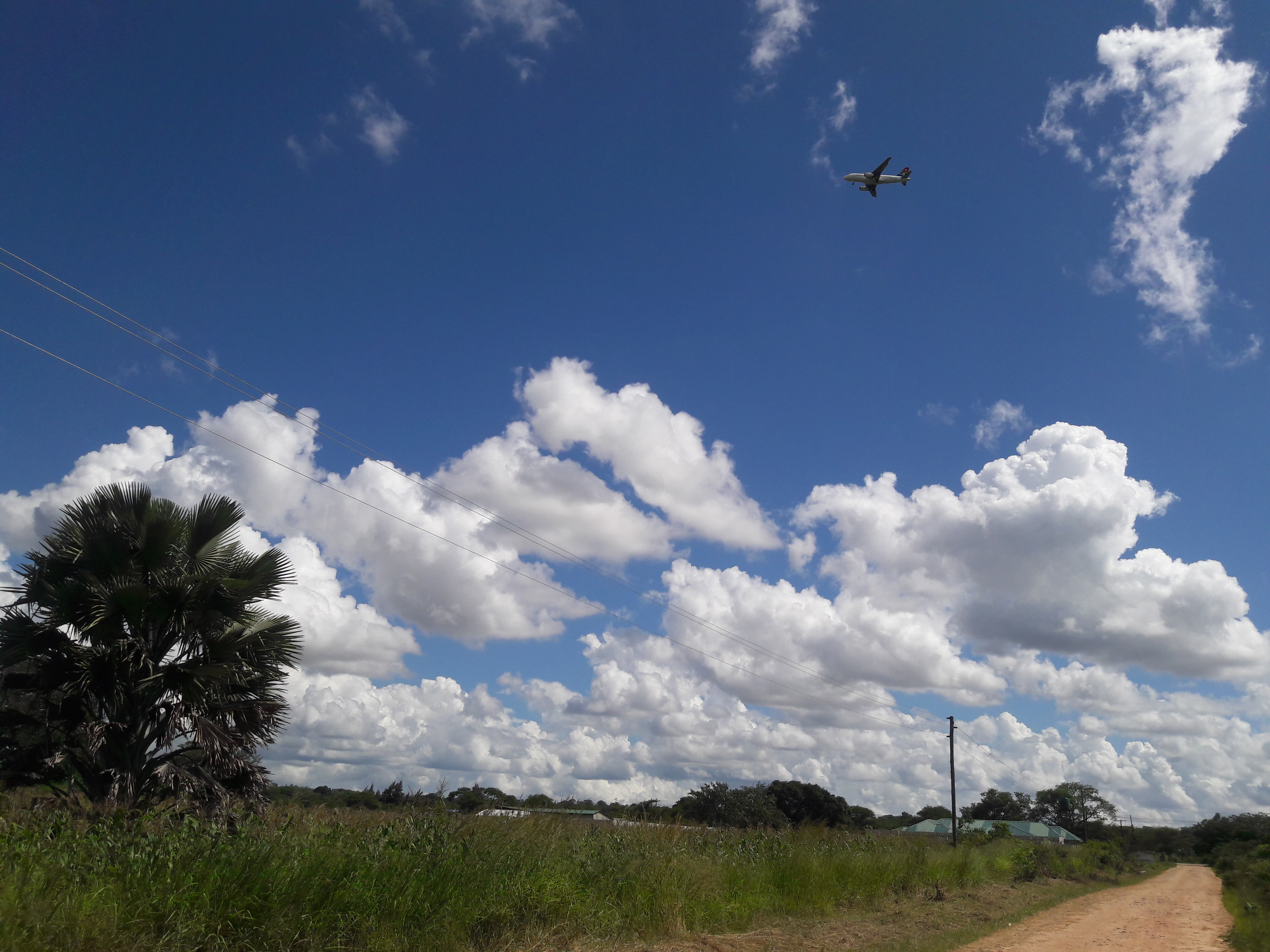

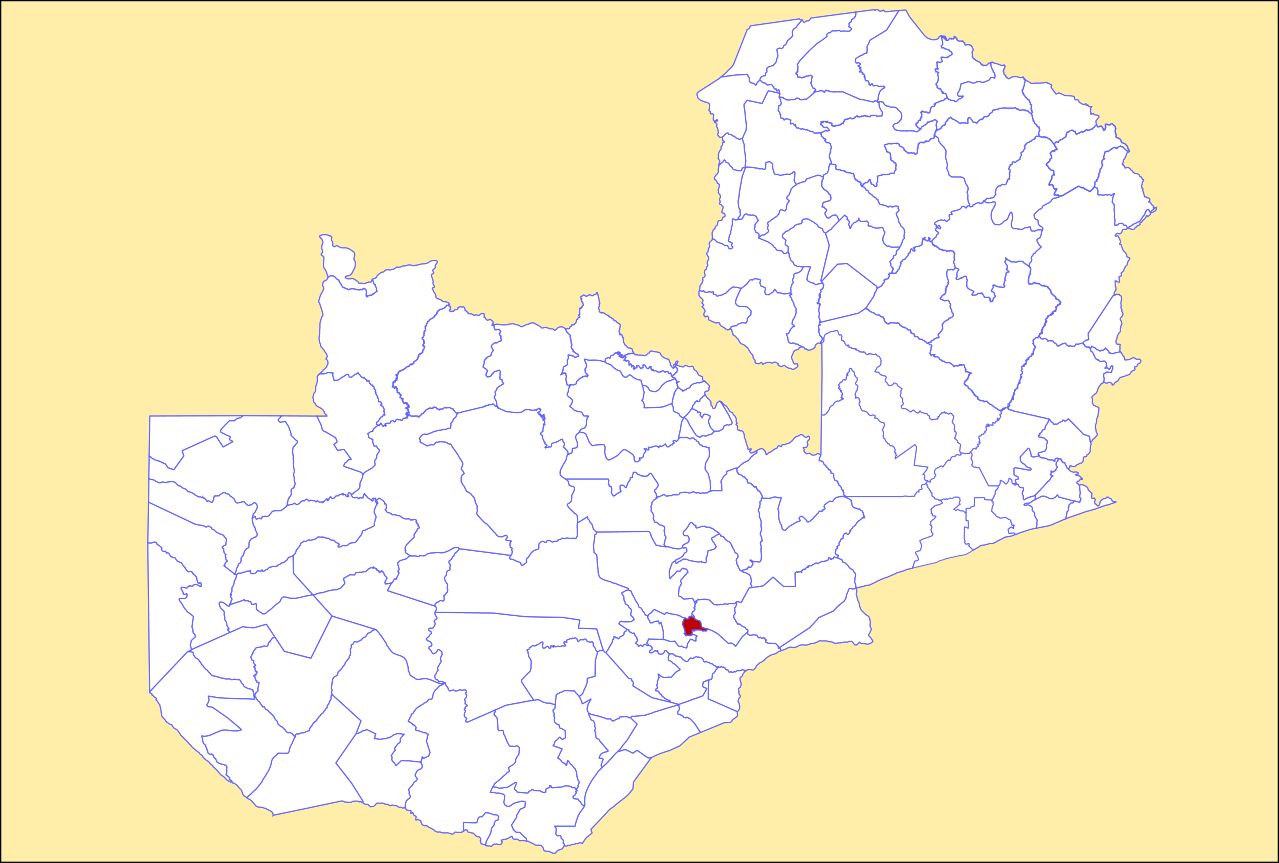
- District location in Zambia
- Country: Zambia
- Province: Lusaka Province
- Capital: Lusaka

Area
  - Total: 418 km^{2} (161 sq mi)

Population (2022)
  - Total: 2,204,059
  - Density: 5,270/km^{2} (13,700/sq mi)
- Time zone: UTC+2 (CAT)

Lusaka District is a district of Zambia, located in Lusaka Province. The capital lies at Lusaka. As of the 2022 Zambian Census, the district had a population of 2,204,059 people.

== Constituencies ==
Lusaka District is divided into ten constituencies, namely:

- Lusaka Central
- Matero
- Mandevu
- Munali
- Chawama
- Kabwata
- Kanyama
- Lima
- Roma
- Makeni
