= Wilson Kalumba =

Zambian politician (died 2018)

Wilson Chisala Kalumba (c.28 February 1964 – 15 May 2018) was a Zambian politician who served as the mayor of Lusaka from 2016 until his death on 15 May 2018.
