= 2021 Zambian general election =

- 12 August 2021
- Presidential election
- Registered: 7,023,499
- Turnout: 70.61% (▲14.16 pp)
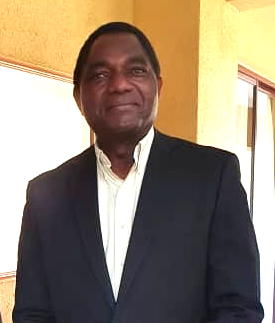

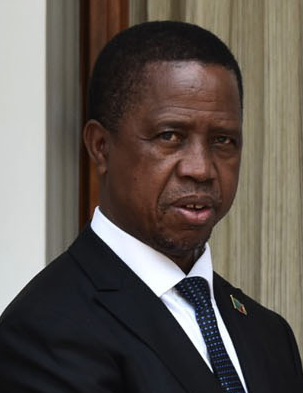
| Nominee | Hakainde Hichilema | Edgar Lungu |
| Party | UPND | PF |
| Running mate | Mutale Nalumango | Nkandu Luo |
| Popular vote | 2,852,348 | 1,870,780 |
| Percentage | 59.02% | 38.71% |
President before election
Edgar Lungu
PF
Elected President
Hakainde Hichilema
UPND
- Parliamentary election
- 156 of the 167 seats in the National Assembly; 84 seats needed for a majority
- Turnout: 70.30% (▲14.16 pp)
| Party | Leader | Vote % | Seats | +/– |
|---|---|---|---|---|
| UPND | Hakainde Hichilema | 46.22 | 82 | +24 |
| PF | Edgar Lungu | 35.70 | 60 | −20 |
| PNUP | Highvie Hamududu | 0.27 | 1 | +1 |
| Independents | – | 14.31 | 13 | −1 |
This lists parties that won seats. See the complete results below.
Hichilema
50-60%
80-90%
>90%
Lungu
40-50%
50-60%
60-70%

| Speaker of the National Assembly before | Speaker of the National Assembly after |
|---|---|
| Patrick Matibini; PF | Nelly Mutti; UPND |

General elections were held in Zambia on 12 August 2021 to elect the President, National Assembly, mayors, council chairs and councillors. Hakainde Hichilema of the United Party for National Development was elected president, defeating incumbent Edgar Lungu of the Patriotic Front.

On 16 August, Lungu conceded in a televised statement, sending a letter and congratulating Hichilema.

== Electoral system ==
The President is elected via the two-round system. Of the 167 members of the National Assembly, 156 are elected by the first-past-the-post system in single-member constituencies, with a further eight appointed by the President and three others being ex-officio members: the Vice President, the Speaker and a deputy speaker elected from outside the National Assembly (a second deputy speaker is chosen from among the elected members). The minimum voting age is 18, whilst National Assembly candidates must be at least 21.

== Candidates ==
A total of sixteen candidates registered to run for the presidency. The race was expected to be a close race between Edgar Lungu of the Patriotic Front and Hakainde Hichilema of the United Party for National Development. Both competed in the 2016 presidential elections, which Lungu won by a margin of 50.35% to 47.63%.

Registered candidates
| Presidential candidate | | Running mate | Party |
|---|---|---|---|
| 1. | Edgar Lungu | Nkandu Luo | Patriotic Front |
| 2. | Enock Tonga | Bright Chomba | 3rd Liberation Movement |
| 3. | Sean Enock Tembo | Henry Muleya | Patriots For Economic Progress |
| 4. | Andyford Banda | Gerald Mulao | People’s Alliance For Change |
| 5. | Chishala Kateka | Samuel Kasanka | New Heritage Party |
| 6. | Kasonde Mwenda | Changala Siame | Economic Freedom Fighters |
| 7. | Stephen Nyirenda | Lucy Changwe | National Restoration Party |
| 8. | Lazarus Chisela | Rosemary Chivumba | Zambians United For Sustainable Development |
| 9. | Richard Silumbe | Kaela Kamwenshe | Leadership Movement |
| 10. | Highvie Hamududu | Kasote Singogo | Party of National Unity and Progress |
| 11. | Fred M'membe | Cosmas Musumali | Socialist Party |
| 12. | Harry Kalaba | Judith Kabemba | Democratic Party |
| 13. | Hakainde Hichilema | Mutale Nalumango | United Party for National Development |
| 14. | Nevers Mumba | Reuben Sambo | Movement for Multi-Party Democracy |
| 15. | Charles Chanda | Simon Mbulu | United Prosperous and Peaceful Zambia |
| 16. | Trevor Mwamba | John Harawa | United National Independence Party |

== Campaign ==
On 15 May 2021, Electoral Commission of Zambia chair Esau Chulu launched the start of the election campaign. However politicians were advised to minimise large crowd gatherings during campaign meetings due to the COVID-19 pandemic. The National Assembly was dissolved on 12 May by President Edgar Lungu to provide a level playing field in the campaign. However, Lungu remained in office as per constitutional requirements.

=== Violence and virus cases rise ===
On 26 May Lungu launched his own campaign. He also directed the police service and Ministry of Health to ensure enforcement of the COVID-19 pandemic health regulations and guidelines without fear or favour. On 3 June, due to the rise in COVID-19 cases, the Electoral Commission suspended campaign rallies again to avoid large crowds. On 15 June, the Electoral Commission banned the Patriotic Front and United Party for National Development from campaigning in Lusaka, Mpulungu, Namwala and Nakonde due to political violence. The Commission also banned all roadshows across the country to curb the transmission of COVID-19. On 1 August Lungu ordered the deployment of the military to help the police fight escalating political violence during the campaign.

On 28 July UPND Secretary General Batuke Imenda released a statement that the party was disappointed with government institutions being used by President Lungu to block UPND presidential candidate Hakainde Hichilema from campaigning. On 30 July, Hichilema and his campaign team were prevented from entering Chipata and detained on the runway of Chipata Airport. Before Hichilema's arrival in Chipata, police had teargassed his supporters. On 3 August, police in Mbala blocked Hichilema and his campaign team from entering the town, with police claiming that he needed a permit to enter.

=== Campaign tactics ===
Hichilema heavily criticised Lungu, claiming he had used state power to interfere with the elections. In a campaign video, Hichilema portrayed Lungu as a morally corrupt individual with a history of monetary mismanagement, while portraying himself as fiscally responsible.

== Conduct ==
Three days before the elections the government openly stated there was a possibility of an internet shutdown if citizens failed to use cyberspace responsibly during the electoral process. In response to the initial report, Information and Broadcasting Services Permanent Secretary Amos Malupenga promptly issued a statement dismissing the claims as malicious. However, there was a subsequent reversal in Malupenga's stance, as he admitted that an internet shutdown was a viable option. He emphasised the government's stance on preventing the abuse of cyberspace and warned of potential inconveniences if individuals were found to be engaging in misconduct. Malupenga stressed that the government would invoke relevant legal provisions to maintain law and order and ensure peace and stability during the election period.

On 12 August numerous Twitter users took to the platform to express concerns about the apparent shutdown of popular social media and messaging apps such as Messenger, Facebook, Instagram and WhatsApp in the country. This caused a significant impact as it hindered the flow of information and communication on a vital day for democratic processes. Reports surfaced that internet users resorted to using Virtual Private Network (VPN) services as a workaround to bypass the restrictions imposed on WhatsApp and various social media platforms. Despite these efforts to maintain connectivity, the situation raised questions about the accessibility and freedom of expression during the election period.

In response to the claims, Malupenga refuted the reports, dismissing them as "malicious." He emphasized the government's stance on responsible internet usage, stating that the government would not tolerate any abuse of the internet. Malupenga went on to caution that if any misconduct occurred, the government reserved the right to take legal action to prevent any potential disruption of law and order, particularly during the sensitive election period. His remarks underscored the government's commitment to ensuring a secure and orderly electoral process. Despite Malupenga's statements, the restrictions on social media platforms persisted, creating a challenging environment for citizens to freely express their views and share information. The limitations on the platforms added an additional layer of complexity to an already tense election period, sparking concerns about the implications for freedom of speech and information dissemination in the country.

== Results ==
On 16 August Hakainde Hichilema was declared president-elect of Zambia. At the time of the announcement, 155 out of Zambia's 156 constituencies had been counted, with only Mandevu constituency still to declare. As the votes in that constituency were insufficient to affect the outcome, the electoral commission announced Hichilema's victory. Edgar Lungu conceded defeat shortly after the announcement.

=== President ===
| Candidate | Running mate | Party | Votes | % |
|---|---|---|---|---|
| Hakainde Hichilema | Mutale Nalumango | United Party for National Development | 2,852,348 | 59.02 |
| Edgar Lungu | Nkandu Luo | Patriotic Front | 1,870,780 | 38.71 |
| Harry Kalaba | Judith Kabemba | Democratic Party | 25,231 | 0.52 |
| Andyford Banda | Gerald Mulao | People’s Alliance For Change | 19,937 | 0.41 |
| Fred M'membe | Cosmas Musumali | Socialist Party | 16,644 | 0.34 |
| Highvie Hamududu | Kasote Singogo | Party of National Unity and Progress | 10,480 | 0.22 |
| Chishala Kateka | Samuel Kasanka | New Heritage Party | 8,169 | 0.17 |
| Charles Chanda | Simon Mbulu | United Prosperous and Peaceful Zambia | 6,543 | 0.14 |
| Lazarus Chisela | Rosemary Chivumba | Zambians United For Sustainable Development | 5,253 | 0.11 |
| Nevers Mumba | Reuben Sambo | Movement for Multi-Party Democracy | 4,968 | 0.10 |
| Enock Tonga | Bright Chomba | 3rd Liberation Movement | 3,112 | 0.06 |
| Trevor Mwamba | John Harawa | United National Independence Party | 3,036 | 0.06 |
| Sean Enock Tembo | Henry Muleya | Patriots For Economic Progress | 1,813 | 0.04 |
| Stephen Nyirenda | Lucy Changwe | National Restoration Party | 1,808 | 0.04 |
| Kasonde Mwenda | Changala Siame | Economic Freedom Fighters | 1,345 | 0.03 |
| Richard Silumbe | Kaela Kamwenshe | Leadership Movement | 1,296 | 0.03 |
| Total | | | 4,832,763 | 100.00 |
| Valid votes | | | 4,832,763 | 97.45 |
| Invalid/blank votes | | | 126,569 | 2.55 |
| Total votes | | | 4,959,332 | 100.00 |
| Registered voters/turnout | | | 7,023,499 | 70.61 |
Source: Electoral Commission

=== National Assembly ===
The election in Kaumbwe constituency did not take place on 12 August due to the death of the UPND candidate and was postponed until 21 October 2021.

| Party | Votes | % | Seats | +/– |
|---|---|---|---|---|
| United Party for National Development | 2,230,324 | 46.22 | 82 | +24 |
| Patriotic Front | 1,722,718 | 35.70 | 60 | –20 |
| Socialist Party | 61,325 | 1.27 | 0 | New |
| Democratic Party | 50,886 | 1.05 | 0 | 0 |
| People's Alliance for Change | 20,227 | 0.42 | 0 | 0 |
| Party of National Unity and Progress | 13,178 | 0.27 | 1 | +1 |
| United National Independence Party | 12,742 | 0.26 | 0 | 0 |
| Forum for Democracy and Development | 4,006 | 0.08 | 0 | –1 |
| National Democratic Congress | 3,807 | 0.08 | 0 | New |
| Movement for Multi-Party Democracy | 3,665 | 0.08 | 0 | –3 |
| Leadership Movement | 3,585 | 0.07 | 0 | New |
| Christian Democratic Party | 3,471 | 0.07 | 0 | New |
| New Heritage Party | 1,762 | 0.04 | 0 | 0 |
| Golden Party Zambia | 858 | 0.02 | 0 | New |
| National Restoration Party | 664 | 0.01 | 0 | 0 |
| Zambians United for Sustainable Development | 554 | 0.01 | 0 | New |
| Green Party of Zambia | 499 | 0.01 | 0 | 0 |
| United Prosperous and Peaceful Zambia | 309 | 0.01 | 0 | New |
| Movement for Democratic Change | 306 | 0.01 | 0 | New |
| Patriots for Economic Progress | 232 | 0.00 | 0 | New |
| Economic Freedom Fighters | 104 | 0.00 | 0 | 0 |
| Independents | 690,418 | 14.31 | 13 | –1 |
| Appointed and ex-officio | | | 11 | – |
| Total | 4,825,640 | 100.00 | 167 | 0 |
| Valid votes | 4,825,640 | 97.74 | | |
| Invalid/blank votes | 111,726 | 2.26 | | |
| Total votes | 4,937,366 | 100.00 | | |
| Registered voters/turnout | 7,023,499 | 70.30 | | |
Source: Electoral Commission

== Reactions ==
=== Domestic ===
- On 14 August Edgar Lungu, the incumbent president, declared the elections "not free and fair" and stated they should therefore be nullified. He was pointing to the violence that happened in three provinces during election day when two members were murdered and PF supporters went into hiding. He also added that the governing party polling agents were brutalized and chased from polling stations, a situation that left the ruling party votes unprotected. On 16 August Edgar Lungu and the Patriotic Front conceded and accepted defeat, sending a letter and congratulating president-elect Hichilema. Lungu also conceded in a televised statement, "I would like to congratulate my brother Hakainde Hichilema for being elected as the 7th president of mother Zambia".

=== International ===
- European Union: On 14 August the EU Chief observer published a Press Release only commenting on observation undertaken up until the 14th of August. Maria Arena, the Chief Observer, said the election was largely calm and well-administered despite long queues, which shows the devotion of Zambians to exercise their right to vote; however, concerning the campaign, the Chief Observer noted that the campaigns took place in a highly competitive environment, adding that selective application of laws and regulations, misuse of state resources and one-sided media reporting meant that a level playing field was not achieved. The EU EOM is yet to publish its final report, with recommendations for improving the electoral framework for future elections.
- African Union: On 14 August the head of the African Union's observer mission, Ernest Bai Koroma said that voting "operations were conducted in a peaceful, transparent and professional manner".
- Nigeria: Nigerian President Muhammadu Buhari congratulated President-elect Hakainde Hichilema on his victory. He also commended incumbent president Edgar Lungu for accepting the outcome of the election and a peaceful transfer of power, "noting that this patriotic disposition deserves the praise of all lovers of democracy."
- Zimbabwe: Zimbabwe's main opposition leader Nelson Chamisa congratulated Hichilema's victory, "I’m so humbled and excited to have received a call and personally congratulated my brother and President-elect Hichilema".
- Uganda: Forum for Democratic Change Deputy secretary general Harold Kaija congratulated Hichilema's upon his victory over the incumbent president Edgar Lungu.
- South Africa: Both president Cyril Ramaphosa and main opposition leader John Steenhuisen congratulated Hichilema's victory.
