= United Party for National Development =

Political party in Zambia

- Abbreviation: UPND
- President: Hakainde Hichilema
- Chairperson: Collins Maoma
- Secretary-General: Batuke Imenda
- Governing body: National Management Committee
- Spokesperson: Cornelius Mweetwa
- Vice President: Mutale Nalumango
- Deputy Secretary-General: Getrude Imenda
- National Treasurer: Watson Lumba
- Founder: Anderson Mazoka
- Founded: December 1998
- Split from: MMD
- Youth wing: UPND Youth League
- Membership (2024): ▲250,000
- Ideology: Liberalism; Agrarianism
- Political position: Centre-right
- National affiliation: UPND Alliance
- Continental affiliation: Africa Liberal Network
- Colours: Red; Yellow
- Slogan: Zambia Forward
- National Assembly: 171 / 266
- Pan-African Parliament: 3 / 5 (Zambian seats)

Website
- upndzambia.org

The United Party for National Development (UPND) is a political party in Zambia, founded in December 1998 by Anderson Mazoka, a former executive of the Anglo American Corporation. The party emerged as a significant opposition force following a split from the Movement for Multi-Party Democracy (MMD). The UPND positions itself as a centrist party with strong ideological commitments to social and economic liberalism, advocating for policies that support free-market principles, human rights, and democratic governance. The party receives its highest support from rural regions of the country.

The UPND rose to national prominence under the leadership of Anderson Mazoka and his protege, Hakainde Hichilema, a businessman who assumed the party's presidency after Mazoka's death in 2006. Under Hichilema's leadership, the party continued to be a major force in Zambian politics, contesting multiple elections before finally winning the presidency decisively in the 2021 elections.

The UPND is also a member of the Africa Liberal Network, aligning itself with other liberal parties across the continent.

== History ==
The UPND was established in December 1998 and was initially led by Anderson Mazoka, who had left the Movement for Multi-Party Democracy (MMD) shortly before that. Mazoka was the party's presidential candidate for the 2001 general elections, finishing second with 27% of the vote, less than 2% behind the winner Levy Mwanawasa of the MMD. In the National Assembly elections the UPND won 49 seats, becoming the second largest party after the MMD.

In March 2006, the party joined the United Democratic Alliance, formed by the three largest opposition parties to contest that year's general elections. After the death of Mazoka in May 2006, Hakainde Hichilema became party leader, and was the alliance's presidential candidate. However, he finished third behind Mwanawasa and Michael Sata with 25% of the vote. The UDA won only 26 seats in the National Assembly, down from the 74 the three parties had won in 2001.

Hichilema was the UPND candidate for the 2008 presidential by-election, finishing third with 20% of the vote. He finished third again in the 2011 general election with 18% of the vote, whilst the UPND won 28 seats in the National Assembly, becoming the third-largest party.

Hichilema was selected as the party's candidate for the 2015 presidential by-election. Hichilema became the main opponent to the Patriotic Front (PF) candidate Edgar Lungu after receiving the backing of several MMD MPs. Although Hichilema received 47% of the vote, Lungu was elected with 48% of the vote. Hichilema contested the 2016 general election as the main opponent to Lungu and Hichilema finished second with 47% of the vote while Lungu was re-elected with 50% of the vote.

In 2018, the UPND was one of the 10 opposition political parties that formed the Opposition Alliance, with Charles Milupi of the Alliance for Democracy and Development as the chairperson. In February 2021, Hichilema was chosen by the alliance to be the flag carrier of the alliance and the sole presidential candidate for the alliance at the 2021 general election, while also deciding that only the UPND will be used for candidacy identification in all elective positions. The Opposition Alliance was rebranded as the UPND Alliance. Hichilema decided on 23 February 2021 that Mutale Nalumango (the UPND national chairlady) would be his running mate at the election.

In the 2021 general election, after almost 23 years in opposition, the UPND became the largest party in the National Assembly, winning a total 82 seats, forming 46.64% of parliament. The Patriotic Front won 59 seats (35.30% of parliament) and were therefore Zambia's largest opposition party.

After three months of official campaigns in 2021 that were briefly suspended first voluntarily upon the death of Zambia's first President Kenneth Kaunda in June, and then on instruction from the electoral authority due to incidents of political violence in several districts, Hichilema and Nalumango were elected President-Elect and Vice President-Elect with 2,852,348 votes or 59.02% of the vote.

== Youth representation ==
The UPND has a youth league, the UPND Youth League. This youth League was formed to mobilise youth concerns. It represents young people from across Zambia. The party has signed a social contract with the youths, making it the first political party in Africa to have a youthful agenda.

== Electoral history ==
=== Presidential elections ===
Election	Party candidate	Votes	%	Result
2001	Anderson Mazoka	472,697	27.20%	Lost ✗
2006	Hakainde Hichilema	693,772	25.32%	Lost ✗
2008	Hakainde Hichilema	353,018	19.70%	Lost ✗
2011	Hakainde Hichilema	506,763	18.17%	Lost ✗
2015	Hakainde Hichilema	780,168	46.67%	Lost ✗
2016	Hakainde Hichilema	1,760,347	47.63%	Lost ✗
2021	Hakainde Hichilema	2,852,348	59.02%	Elected ✓
2026	Hakainde Hichilema	2,965,326	60.49%	Elected ✓

=== National Assembly elections ===
Election	Party leader	Votes	%	Seats	+/–	Position	Result
2001	Anderson Mazoka	416,236	23.77%	49 / 150	▲49	▲2nd	Opposition
2006	Hakainde Hichilema	610,608 as part of UDA	22.51%	26 / 150	▼48	▼3rd	Opposition
2011	Hakainde Hichilema	464,527	17.21%	28 / 150	▲2	3rd	Opposition
2016	Hakainde Hichilema	1,525,049	41.66%	58 / 156	▲30	▲2nd	Opposition
2021	Hakainde Hichilema	2,230,324	46.22%	82 / 156	▲24	▲1st	Majority government
2026	Hakainde Hichilema	TBA	TBA	141 / 280	▲59	1st	Majority government

== National Management Committee ==
The National Management Committee (NMC) of the United Party for National Development (UPND) is the party's chief executive organ, responsible for overseeing the party's strategic direction and governance. The NMC is elected every five years during the party's General Assembly and is responsible for electing the National Executive Committee for day-to-day decision-making.
