= List of members of the National Assembly of Zambia (1964–1968) =

The 75 members of the Legislative Council of Northern Rhodesia, later the National Assembly of Zambia, from 1964 until 1968 were elected in January 1964. A total of 29 candidates were returned unopposed, including 24 United National Independence Party members and five Zambian African National Congress.

== List of members ==
=== Main roll seats ===
| Constituency | Member | Party |
|---|---|---|
| Abercorn | James Sinyangwe | United National Independence Party |
| Balovale | Samuel Mbilishi | United National Independence Party |
| Bangweulu | Hankey Kalanga | United National Independence Party |
| Chadiza | Zongani Banda | United National Independence Party |
| Chingola–Bancroft | Wilson Chakulya | United National Independence Party |
| Chinsali | Robert Makasa | United National Independence Party |
| Chisamba | Aaron Chikatula | Zambian African National Congress |
| Choma | Edgar Musangu | Zambian African National Congress |
| Fort Jameson | Wesley Nyirenda | United National Independence Party |
| Gwembe | Siantumbu Beyani | Zambian African National Congress |
| Isoka | Steven Sikombe | United National Independence Party |
| Kabompo | Hannock Kikombe | United National Independence Party |
| Kabwe | Nalumino Mundia | United National Independence Party |
| Kafironda | Ditton Mwiinga | United National Independence Party |
| Kalabo | Mubiana Nalilungwe | United National Independence Party |
| Kalomo | Landson Hantuba | Zambian African National Congress |
| Kasama | Simon Kapwepwe | United National Independence Party |
| Kasama North | Alex Kaunda | United National Independence Party |
| Kasempa | Matiya Ngalande | United National Independence Party |
| Katete | Charles Thornicroft | United National Independence Party |
| Kawambwa | Dingiswayo Banda | United National Independence Party |
| Kazimuli | Margret Mbeba | United National Independence Party |
| Kitwe North | Alexander Chikwanda | United National Independence Party |
| Kitwe South | Jonathan Chivunga | United National Independence Party |
| Livingstone | Mainza Chona | United National Independence Party |
| Luanshya–Kalulushi | Sikota Wina | United National Independence Party |
| Lukanga | Henry Shamabanse | United National Independence Party |
| Lukulu | Mukwenje Chikulo | United National Independence Party |
| Lukusuzi | Humprey Mulemba | United National Independence Party |
| Lundazi | Axon Soko | United National Independence Party |
| Lusaka East | James John Skinner | United National Independence Party |
| Lusaka West | Elijah Mudenda | United National Independence Party |
| Luwingu | Unia Mwila | United National Independence Party |
| Luwingu West | Justin Chimba | United National Independence Party |
| Magoye | Amos Walubita | Zambian African National Congress |
| Malambo Central | John Ngoma | United National Independence Party |
| Malambo North | Haswell Mwale | United National Independence Party |
| Mankoya | Jethro Mutti | United National Independence Party |
| Mansa | Lewis Changufu | United National Independence Party |
| Mazabuka | Mufaya Mumbuna | Zambian African National Congress |
| Mkushi | Kenneth Kaunda | United National Independence Party |
| Mongu-Lealui | Arthur Wina | United National Independence Party |
| Monze | Harry Nkumbula | Zambian African National Congress |
| Mpika | Alexander Grey Zulu | United National Independence Party |
| Mporokoso | Mulenga Chapoloko | United National Independence Party |
| Mufulira | John Chisata | United National Independence Party |
| Mumbwa | Allan Chilimboyi | Zambian African National Congress |
| Mweru | John Mwakakatwe | United National Independence Party |
| Mwinilunga | John Japau | Zambian African National Congress |
| Nalikwanda | Mukwae Nakatindi Yeta Nganga | United National Independence Party |
| Namwala | Edward Liso | Zambian African National Congress |
| Nchanga | Aaron Milner | United National Independence Party |
| Ndola East | Nephas Tembo | United National Independence Party |
| Ndola Rural | Mischeck Banda | United National Independence Party |
| Ndola West | Thakorbhai Desai | United National Independence Party |
| North Luapula | Frank Chitambala | United National Independence Party |
| Petauke | Benjamin Anoya Zulu | United National Independence Party |
| Petauke South | Reuben Kamanga | United National Independence Party |
| Roan | Ester Banda | United National Independence Party |
| Rufunsa | Solomon Kalulu | United National Independence Party |
| Senanga | Munukayumbwa Sipalo | United National Independence Party |
| Serenje | Mateo Kakumbi | United National Independence Party |
| Sesheke | Durton Konoso | United National Independence Party |
| Solwezi | William Nkanza | United National Independence Party |
| South Luapula | Mwamda Chisembele | United National Independence Party |
Source: East Africa and Rhodesia

=== Reserved roll seats ===
| Constituency | Member | Party |
|---|---|---|
| Central | John Roberts | National Progressive Party |
| Copperbelt Central | Jerry Steyn | National Progressive Party |
| Copperbelt North | Pieter Wulff | National Progressive Party |
| Copperbelt North-West | Samuel Magnus | National Progressive Party |
| Copperbelt South | Rodney Malcomson | National Progressive Party |
| Copperbelt West | Hugh Stanley | National Progressive Party |
| Luangwa | John Dickson | National Progressive Party |
| Midlands | Hugh Mitchley | National Progressive Party |
| Ndola | Cecil Dennistoun Burney | National Progressive Party |
| Zambezi | John Burnside | National Progressive Party |
Source: East Africa and Rhodesia

=== Replacements ===
During the term of the National Assembly, several by-elections took place to replace members, or in cases where members had changed parties.

| Constituency | Original member | Party | By-election date | New member | Party |
|---|---|---|---|---|---|
| Kitwe North | Alexander Chikwanda | United National Independence Party | 1964 | Andrew Mutemba | United National Independence Party |
| Abercorn | James Sinyangwe | United National Independence Party | 1964 | Rankin Sikasula | United National Independence Party |
| Kasempa | Matiya Ngalande | United National Independence Party | 1964 | Bernard Mwelumka | United National Independence Party |
| Petauke | Benjamin Anoya Zulu | United National Independence Party | 1964 | Emmanuel Chirwa | United National Independence Party |
| Serenje | Mateo Kakumbi | United National Independence Party | 1964 | Miselo Kapika | United National Independence Party |
| Chingola/Bancroft | Wilson Chakulya | United National Independence Party | | Nephas Mulenga | United National Independence Party |
| Mkushi | Kenneth Kaunda | United National Independence Party | | Chesya Lialabi | United National Independence Party |
| Copperbelt Central | Jerry Steyn | National Progressive Party | 1965 | Richard Farmer | |
| Ndola West | Thakorbhai Desai | United National Independence Party | 1965 | Peter Chanda | United National Independence Party |
| Copperbelt West | Hugh Stanley | Independent | | Safeli Chileshe | United National Independence Party |
| Lukulu | Mukwenje Chikulo | United National Independence Party | | Green Mwala | United National Independence Party |
| Mazabuka | Mufaya Mumbuna | Zambian African National Congress | 1967 | Lazarus Cheelo | United National Independence Party |
| Copperbelt North | Pieter Wulff | Independent | | Joseph Mutale | United National Independence Party |
| Choma | Edgar Musangu | Zambian African National Congress | 1 March 1968 | Edward Nyanga | Zambian African National Congress |
| Gwembe | Siantumbu Beyani | Zambian African National Congress | 1 March 1968 | Godson Kanyama | Zambian African National Congress |
| Kalomo | Landson Hantuba | Zambian African National Congress | 1 March 1968 | Moffat Mpasela | Zambian African National Congress |
| Magoye | Amos Walubita | Zambian African National Congress | 1 March 1968 | Hamwende Kayumba | Zambian African National Congress |

=== Non-elected members ===
| Type | Member | Notes |
|---|---|---|
| Speaker | Thomas Williams | Until 14 December 1964 |
| Nominated | Malina Chilila | Until January 1968 |
| Nominated | Peter Matoka | |
| Nominated | Josy Monga | |
| Nominated | Madeline Robertson | |
| Nominated | Maimbolwa Sakubita | |
| Nominated | Matiya Ngalande | From January 1968 |
