= Kabwata (constituency) =

Constituency of the National Assembly of Zambia

Kabwata is a constituency of the National Assembly of Zambia. It covers the Lusaka neighbourhoods of Kabwata, Kamwala, Libala, Chalala and Chilenje in Lusaka District of Lusaka Province.

== List of MPs ==
Election	MP	Party
1973	Mary Mwango	United National Independence Party
1978	Maxwell Sibongo	United National Independence Party
1983	Michael Sata	United National Independence Party
1988	Michael Sata	United National Independence Party
1991	Michael Sata	Movement for Multi-Party Democracy
1996	Godfrey Miyanda	Movement for Multi-Party Democracy
2001 (by-election)	Richard Kachingwe	Forum for Democracy and Development
2001	Given Lubinda	United Party for National Development
2006	Given Lubinda	Patriotic Front
2011	Given Lubinda	Patriotic Front
2016	Given Lubinda	Patriotic Front
2021	Levy Mkandawire	United Party for National Development
2022 (by-election)	Andrew Tayengwa	United Party for National Development
2026	Danny Yenga	National Reconciliation Party for Unity and Prosperity

== Election results ==
=== 2001 by-election ===
In September 2001 a by-election was held after incumbent MP Godfrey Miyanda was expelled from the ruling Movement for Multi-Party Democracy (MMD) together with nine cabinet ministers. The by-election was contested by the MMD (who fielded Dominic Laban Nyirongo), the United National Independence Party (who fielded Kamoyo Mwale) and the Forum for Democracy and Development (who fielded Richard Kachingwe). The by-election was won by Kachingwe, although he was only a Member of Parliament for a few months as general elections were held on 27 December 2001.

=== 2001 general election ===
Candidate	Party	Votes	%
Given Lubinda	United Party for National Development	7,563	33.17
Richard Kachingwe	Forum for Democracy and Development	7,223	31.68
George C. Tembo	Heritage Party	2,191	9.61
Dominic L. Nyrongo	Movement for Multi-Party Democracy	2,159	9.47
Shadrick Kafwimbi	National Citizens' Coalition	1,395	6.12
Mulenga J. Sata	Patriotic Front	708	3.11
Emily F. Chingambu	United National Independence Party	682	2.99
Kapembwa Simukulwa	Independent	446	1.96
Mushikita A. Nkandu	Zambia Republican Party	434	1.90
Total		22,801	100.00
Valid votes		22,801	99.38
Invalid/blank votes		142	0.62
Total votes		22,943	100.00
Registered voters/turnout		37,220	61.64
Source: Electoral Commission

=== 2006 ===
Candidate	Party	Votes	%
Given Lubinda	Patriotic Front	23,419	59.76
Geoffrey Bwalya Mwamba	Movement for Multi-Party Democracy	8,131	20.75
Rowlence N. Banda	United Democratic Alliance	6,058	15.46
Raymond Phiri	Heritage Party	1,581	4.03
Total		39,189	100.00
Valid votes		39,189	98.21
Invalid/blank votes		713	1.79
Total votes		39,902	100.00
Registered voters/turnout		55,799	71.51
Source: Electoral Commission

=== 2011 ===
Candidate	Party	Votes	%
Given Lubinda	Patriotic Front	29,977	74.56
Peter Machungwa	Movement for Multi-Party Democracy	5,869	14.60
Imbuwa Imbuwa	United Party for National Development	3,923	9.76
Mckelvin Kabaso	New Generation Party	190	0.47
Nasson Msoni	Independent	132	0.33
Doreen Shimumbi	Zambians for Empowerment and Development	114	0.28
Total		40,205	100.00
Valid votes		40,205	99.87
Invalid/blank votes		53	0.13
Total votes		40,258	100.00
Registered voters/turnout		72,831	55.28
Source: Electoral Commission
