= Konkola (constituency) =

National Assembly constituency in Zambia

Konkola is a constituency of the National Assembly of Zambia. It was created in 2026 by splitting Chililabombwe constituency. It covers the northern part of Chililabombwe District, including the Kasumbalesa border area and the mining town of Konkola.

== List of MPs ==
Election year	MP	Party
2026	Lucky Sichone	United Party for National Development
