= Chisamba (constituency) =

Constituency of the National Assembly of Zambia

Chisamba is a constituency of the National Assembly of Zambia. It covers Chisamba in Chisamba District of Central Province.

== List of MPs ==
Election year	MP	Party
1964	Aaron Chikatula	Zambian African National Congress
Seat abolished
1973	Richard Kasanda	United National Independence Party
1978	Saul Chipwayambokoma	United National Independence Party
1983	Saul Chipwayambokoma	United National Independence Party
1988	Godwin Chinkuli	United National Independence Party
1991	Mwamutenta Musakabantu	Movement for Multi-Party Democracy
1996	Cecil Holmes	Movement for Multi-Party Democracy
2001	Jethro Masowe	United Party for National Development
2006	Moses Muteteka	Movement for Multi-Party Democracy
2011	Moses Muteteka	Movement for Multi-Party Democracy
2016	Chushi Kasanda	United Party for National Development
2021	Chushi Kasanda	United Party for National Development
2026	Martin Chowa	United Party for National Development

== Election results ==
2001 general election
Candidate	Party	Votes	%
Jethro Masowe	United Party for National Development	4,855	39.97
Cecil Holmes	Movement for Multi-Party Democracy	3,874	31.89
Richard C. Kasanda	United National Independence Party	1,297	10.68
Patrick M. Chukusu	Forum for Democracy and Development	847	6.97
Cosmas B. Musumpuka	Heritage Party	610	5.02
Mark Mumbi	Zambia Republican Party	368	3.03
Brian M. Mulenga	National Citizens' Coalition	224	1.84
Joyce Zyambo	National League for Democracy	73	0.60
Invalid/blank votes		290	–
Total		12,438	100
Registered voters/turnout		19,083	65.18
