= Roan (constituency) =

Constituency of the National Assembly of Zambia

Roan is a constituency of the National Assembly of Zambia. It covers the Roan suburb of Luanshya and the town of Mapatamatu in Luanshya District of Copperbelt Province.

== List of MPs ==
Election year	MP	Party
1962	Hendrick Liebenberg	United Federal Party
1964	Ester Banda	United National Independence Party
1968	Sikota Wina	United National Independence Party
1973	Simfukwe Mulwanda	United National Independence Party
1977 (by-election)	Musoka Chambeshi	United National Independence Party
1978	Saindani Phiri	United National Independence Party
1983	Leonard Mpundu	United National Independence Party
1984 (by-election)	Moses Mwachindalo	United National Independence Party
1988	Moses Mwachindalo	United National Independence Party
1991	Vernon Mwaanga	Movement for Multi-Party Democracy
1996	Vernon Mwaanga	Movement for Multi-Party Democracy
2001	Cameron Pwele	United National Independence Party
2006	Chishimba Kambwili	Patriotic Front
2011	Chishimba Kambwili	Patriotic Front
2016	Chishimba Kambwili	Patriotic Front
2019 (by-election)	Joseph Chishala	National Democratic Congress
2021	Joel Chibuye	Independent
2026	Joel Chibuye	United Party for National Development

== Election results ==
=== 2001 ===
Candidate	Party	Votes	%
Cameron Pwele	United National Independence Party	5,066	28.10
Stephen Chungu	Movement for Multi-Party Democracy	3,685	20.44
Magdalene M. Simfukwe	National Citizens' Coalition	3,307	18.34
Andrew K. Kayekesi	Heritage Party	2,314	12.83
Annie Kasonde	Zambia Republican Party	1,658	9.20
Kasonde Kapota	Forum for Democracy and Development	1,175	6.52
Charity C. Kalisilira	United Party for National Development	574	3.18
Derek Baines	Patriotic Front	140	0.78
Celestine Chomba	Independent	70	0.39
Ellis J. Halaba	Independent	40	0.22
Total		18,029	100.00
Registered voters/turnout		18,620	–
Source: ECZ

=== 2019 ===
Candidate	Party	Votes	%
Joseph Chishala	National Democratic Congress	8,665	59.55
Joel Chibuye	Patriotic Front	5,533	38.02
Mwansa Chama	People's Alliance for Change	210	1.44
Morgan Banda	United Prosperous and Peaceful Zambia	143	0.98
Total		14,551	100.00
Valid votes		14,551	98.98
Invalid/blank votes		150	1.02
Total votes		14,701	100.00
Source: Zambian Observer
