= Kasempa (constituency) =

Constituency of the National Assembly of Zambia

Kasempa is a constituency of the National Assembly of Zambia. It covers the southern and western part of Kasempa District in North-Western Province, including the town of Kasempa.

== List of MPs ==
Election year	MP	Party
1964	Matiya Ngalande	United National Independence Party
1964 (by-election)	Bernard Mwelumka	United National Independence Party
1968	Matiya Ngalande	United National Independence Party
1973	Mark Tambatamba	United National Independence Party
1978	Mark Tambatamba	United National Independence Party
1983	Mark Tambatamba	United National Independence Party
1988	Kasempa Mushitala	United National Independence Party
1991	Patrick Kafumukache	Movement for Multi-Party Democracy
1996	John Muasa	National Party
2001	Patrick Kafumukache	Movement for Multi-Party Democracy
2006	Kabinga Pande	Movement for Multi-Party Democracy
2011	Kabinga Pande	Movement for Multi-Party Democracy
2016	Brenda Tambatamba	United Party for National Development
2021	Brenda Tambatamba	United Party for National Development
2026	Brenda Tambatamba	United Party for National Development
