= Nchelenge (constituency) =

Constituency of the National Assembly of Zambia

Nchelenge is a constituency of the National Assembly of Zambia. It covers Nchelenge and several of the surrounding towns in Nchelenge District of Luapula Province.

== List of MPs ==
Election year	MP	Party
1973	Kamga Mukanga	United National Independence Party
1978	Mukanga Kainga	United National Independence Party
1983	James Mubanga	United National Independence Party
1988	Mukanga Kainga	United National Independence Party
1991	Daniel Mutobola	Movement for Multi-Party Democracy
1996	Ndashi Chitalu	Movement for Multi-Party Democracy
2000 (by-election)	Bwalya Nsakasha	Movement for Multi-Party Democracy
2001	Rosemary Chipampe	Movement for Multi-Party Democracy
2006	Benjamin Mwila	National Democratic Focus
2011	Raymond Mpundu	Patriotic Front
2016	Anthony Malama	Patriotic Front
2021	Simon Mwale	Patriotic Front
2026	Bwalya Kabwe	Resolute Party
