= Mpika (constituency) =

Constituency of the National Assembly of Zambia

Mpika was a constituency of the National Assembly of Zambia. It covered the towns of Chikwanda, Chilonga, Kabuko, Kaole, Mpika and Mwelalo in Mpika District of Muchinga Province.

== List of MPs ==
Election year	MP	Party
Mpika
1964	Alexander Grey Zulu	United National Independence Party
Seat abolished (split into Mpika East and Mpika West)
Mpika Central
1991	Guy Scott	Movement for Multi-Party Democracy
1996	Michael Sata	Movement for Multi-Party Democracy
2001	Mateyo Mwaba	Movement for Multi-Party Democracy
2003 (by-election)	Bwalya Chiti	Movement for Multi-Party Democracy
2006	Mwansa Kapeya	Patriotic Front
2011	Mwansa Kapeya	Patriotic Front
2016	Sylvia Chalikosa	Patriotic Front
Mpika
2021	Francis Kapyanga	Patriotic Front
Seat abolished (split into Mpika North and Mpika South)
