= Brenda Tambatamba =

Zambian politician

Minister of Mines and Minerals Development
- Incumbent
- Assumed office October 2026
- President: Hakainde Hichilema
- Preceded by: Paul Kabuswe

Minister of Labour and Social Security
- In office 7 September 2021 – 15 May 2026
- President: Hakainde Hichilema
- Preceded by: Joyce Nonde-Simukoko
- Succeeded by: Misheck Nyambose

Member of the National Assembly for Kasempa
- Incumbent
- Assumed office August 2016
- Preceded by: Kabinga Pande

Personal details
- Born: Brenda Mwika Tambatamba; 29 April 1961 (age 65)
- Party: United Party for National Development
- Occupation: Politician

Brenda Mwika Tambatamba (born 29 April 1961) is a Zambian politician. She has been a member of the National Assembly of Zambia for Kasempa since 2016 and is the current Minister of Mines and Minerals Development. She is a member of the United Party for National Development. She was the Minister of Labour and Social Security from September 2021 to May 2026.

== Political Career ==
Brenda Tambatamba was the United Party for National Development (UPND) candidate in Kasempa constituency at the 2016 general election and she was elected. She was the UPND candidate in Kasempa again at the 2021 general election and she was re-elected.

After the UPND won the 2021 presidential election in August 2021, Tambatamba was appointed as the Minister of Labour and Social Security by President Hakainde Hichilema the following month.

She was the UPND candidate in Kasempa constituency again at the 2026 general election in August 2026 and she was re-elected. In October 2026, President Hichilema appointed her as the Minister of Mines and Minerals Development.
