= Princess Nakatindi =

Princess Nakatindi may refer to:

- Nakatindi Yeta Nganga (1922–1972), Zambian politician
- Nakatindi Wina (1945–2012), Zambian politician
