= Austin Liato =

Zambian politician (1965–2026)

Minister of Labour and Social Security
- In office 2008–2011
- President: Rupiah Banda
- Succeeded by: Fackson Shamenda

Deputy Minister of Labour and Social Security
- In office 2006–2008

Minister for Lusaka Province
- In office 2005–2006

Deputy Minister of Energy
- In office 2005–2005
- President: Levy Mwanawasa
- Preceded by: Stephen Manjata

Member of the National Assembly for Kaoma Central
- In office January 2002 – September 2011
- Preceded by: Handson Nyundu
- Succeeded by: Carlos Antonio

Personal details
- Born: 23 August 1965
- Died: 6 August 2026 (aged 60) Lusaka, Zambia
- Party: UPND, MMD, PF
- Profession: Accountant

Austin Chisangu Liato (23 August 1965 – 6 August 2026) was a Zambian politician. He served as a member of the National Assembly for Kaoma Central between 2002 and 2011 and as Minister of Labour and Social Security from 2008 until 2011.

== Life and career ==
Prior to entering politics, Liato was an accountant. He was also involved in trade unions and served as president of the Zambia Electricity and Allied Workers Union and Vice-President of the Zambia Congress of Trade Unions. He was the United Party for National Development (UPND) candidate in Kaoma Central in the 2001 general election and was elected to the National Assembly with a 1,169-vote majority. During his first term in parliament he was a member of the Pan-African Parliament. In 2003 he defected to the Movement for Multi-Party Democracy (MMD) and was re-elected in a by-election. In January 2005 he was appointed Provincial Minister for Copperbelt Province, but the appointment was cancelled by President Levy Mwanawasa after it became known that Liato had a court matter ongoing. He was subsequently appointed Deputy Minister of Energy in May 2005, before being appointed Provincial Minister for Lusaka Province later in the year.

At the 2006 general election, Liato was re-elected with an increased majority of 1,700. Following the elections, Liato was appointed Deputy Minister of Labour and Social Security. He was promoted to become Minister of Labour and Social Security in 2008.

Liato was defeated by UPND candidate Carlos Antonio in the 2011 general election. He left the MMD in 2012 and returned to the UPND.

In 2011 Liato was convicted of possession of money reasonably suspected to be the proceeds of crime. Although the ruling was initially overturned by Lusaka High Court, the State took the case to the Supreme Court, and in 2015 he was jailed with hard labour for 24 months and was also ordered to forfeit his farm and K2.1 million that had been found buried on his land. However, he was released from prison in August on compassionate grounds after spending a month in hospital.

Liato contested Kaoma Central in the 2016 general election as the Patriotic Front candidate, but was defeated by Morgan Sitwala of the UPND. In May 2026, Liato applied to contest as an independent candidate in Nkeyema at the 2026 general election to happen on 13 August that year.

Liato died in Lusaka on 6 August 2026, at the age of 60.
