= Esther Banda =

Esther Banda may refer to:

- Esther Banda (footballer) (born 2004), Zambian footballer
- Esther Banda (politician) (born 1958), Zambian politician
- Ester Banda, Zambian politician
