= Ministry of Information and Media =

Government ministry of Zambia

The Ministry of Information and Media is a government ministry in Zambia. It is headed by the Minister of Information and Media.

The ministry controls two publicly owned newspapers, the Times of Zambia and the Zambia Daily Mail, and has a seat on the board of the Zambia National Broadcasting Corporation.

== History ==
The Information and Broadcasting Services portfolio was combined with Tourism during the 1960s before the two were split.

== List of ministers ==
Minister	Party	Term start	Term end
Minister of Information and Posts
Peter Matoka	United National Independence Party	1964	1965
Minister of Information and Postal Services
Lewis Changufu	United National Independence Party	1965	1966
Minister of Information, Broadcasting and Tourism
Sikota Wina	United National Independence Party	1969	1973
Minister of Information and Broadcasting Services
Clement Mwananshiku	United National Independence Party	1974	1975
Unia Mwila	United National Independence Party	1976	1978
Mwika Tambatamba	United National Independence Party	1979	1983
Cosmas Chibanda	United National Independence Party	1983	1986
Samson Mukando	United National Independence Party	1985	1986
Joseph Panabantu	United National Independence Party	1986	1987
Arnold Simuchimba	United National Independence Party	1991	1991
Henry Kristafor	Movement for Multi-Party Democracy	1991	1992
Dipak Patel	Movement for Multi-Party Democracy	1992	1992
Remmy Mushota	Movement for Multi-Party Democracy	1993	1993
Kelly Walubita	Movement for Multi-Party Democracy	1994	1995
Amusaa Mwanamwambwa	Movement for Multi-Party Democracy	1996	1996
Shimaili David Mpamba	Movement for Multi-Party Democracy	1997	1998
Newstead Zimba	Movement for Multi-Party Democracy	1998	2001
Vernon Mwaanga	Movement for Multi-Party Democracy	1999	2001
Newstead Zimba	Movement for Multi-Party Democracy	2002	2003
Mutale Nalumango	Movement for Multi-Party Democracy	2004	2006
Vernon Mwaanga	Movement for Multi-Party Democracy	2006	2006
Mike Mulongoti	Movement for Multi-Party Democracy	2007	2008
Ronnie Shikapwasha	Movement for Multi-Party Democracy	2008	2011
Given Lubinda	Patriotic Front	2011	2012
Fackson Shamenda	Patriotic Front	2012	2012
Kennedy Sakeni	Patriotic Front	2012	2013
Mwansa Kapeya	Patriotic Front	2013	2014
Joseph Katema	Patriotic Front	2014	2015
Chishimba Kambwili	Patriotic Front	2015	2016
Kampamba Mulenga	Patriotic Front	2017	2018
Dora Siliya	Patriotic Front	2018	2021
Minister of Information and Media
Chushi Kasanda	United Party for National Development	2021	2023
Cornelius Mweetwa	United Party for National Development	2023	2026
Source: National Assembly, Ministry of Information and Media

=== Deputy ministers ===
Deputy Minister	Party	Term start	Term end
Parliamentary Secretary to the Minister of Information and Postal Services
Hankey Kalanga	United National Independence Party	1964	1965
Minister of State for Information, Broadcasting and Tourism
Miselo Kapika	United National Independence Party	1968	1969
Amock Phiri	United National Independence Party	1970	1970
Andreya Masiye	United National Independence Party	1970	1971
Joseph Litana	United National Independence Party	1971	1973
Mwika Tambatamba	United National Independence Party	1977	1978
Minister of State for Information and Broadcasting
Mutumbu Bull	United National Independence Party	1978	1979
Chiwala Banda	United National Independence Party	1980	1983
Rabbison Chongo	United National Independence Party	1986	1987
David Nkhata	United National Independence Party	1989	1991
Parliamentary Secretary for Information and Broadcasting Services
Noel Mvula	United National Independence Party	1990	1991
Peter Kasoma	United National Independence Party	1990	1991
Deputy Minister of Information and Broadcasting Services
Daniel Pule	Movement for Multi-Party Democracy	1991	1992
Stephen Manjata	Movement for Multi-Party Democracy	1993	1993
Eric Silwamba	Movement for Multi-Party Democracy	1994	1994
Ernest Mwansa	Movement for Multi-Party Democracy	1997	1998
Fidelis Mando	Movement for Multi-Party Democracy	1998	2001
Webster Chipili	Movement for Multi-Party Democracy	2002	2003
George Chulumanda	Movement for Multi-Party Democracy	2003	2004
Gaston Sichilimia	Movement for Multi-Party Democracy	2004	2005
Benny Tetamashimba	Movement for Multi-Party Democracy	2006	2007
David Phiri	Movement for Multi-Party Democracy	2007	2008
Elijah Muchima	Movement for Multi-Party Democracy	2008	2009
Angela Cifire	Movement for Multi-Party Democracy	2010	2011
Mwansa Kapeya	Patriotic Front	2012	2012
Poniso Njeulu	United Party for National Development	2013	2014
Source: National Assembly, Ministry of Information and Media
