= Kaoma Central =

Constituency of the National Assembly of Zambia

Kaoma Central is a constituency of the National Assembly of Zambia. It covers Kaoma and surrounding areas in Kaoma District of Western Province.

== List of MPs ==
Election year	MP	Party
Mankoya
1964	Jethro Mutti	United National Independence Party
1968	Mainza Chona	United National Independence Party
Kaoma
1973	Jameson Kalaluka	United National Independence Party
1978	Jameson Kalaluka	United National Independence Party
1983	Jameson Kalaluka	United National Independence Party
1988	Fred Chabaya	United National Independence Party
1991	Godden Mandandi	Movement for Multi-Party Democracy
1996	Hudson Nyundu	Movement for Multi-Party Democracy
Kaoma Central
2001	Austin Liato	United Party for National Development
2004 (by-election)	Austin Liato	Movement for Multi-Party Democracy
2006	Austin Liato	Movement for Multi-Party Democracy
2011	Carlos Antonio	United Party for National Development
2016	Morgan Sitwala	United Party for National Development
2021	Morgan Sitwala	United Party for National Development
2026	Morgan Sitwala	United Party for National Development
