= Given Lubinda =

Zambian politician (born 1963)

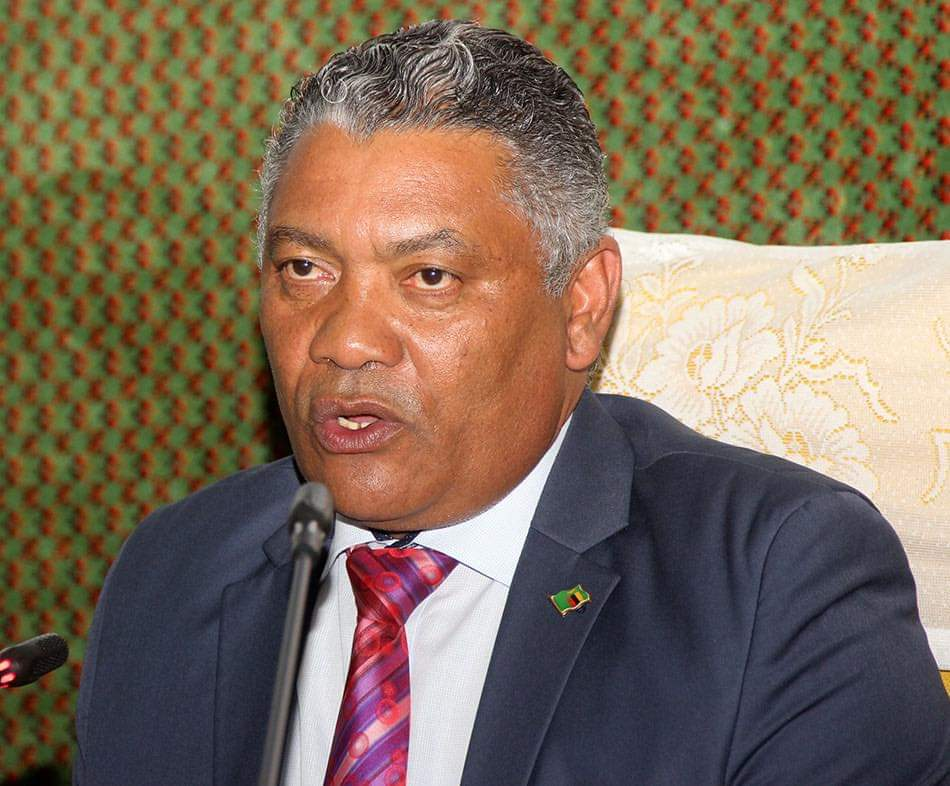

Acting Chairman of the Patriotic Front
- In office 28 August 2021 – 24 October 2023
- Preceded by: Edgar Lungu
- Succeeded by: Miles Sampa

Member of the National Assembly for Kabwata
- In office December 2001 – August 2021
- Preceded by: Richard Kachingwe
- Succeeded by: Levy Mkandawire

Minister of Justice
- In office 29 September 2016 – May 2021
- President: Edgar Lungu
- Preceded by: Ngosa Simbyakula
- Succeeded by: Mulambo Haimbe

Minister of Agriculture
- In office 12 February 2015 – May 2016
- President: Edgar Lungu
- Preceded by: Wilbur Simuusa
- Succeeded by: Dora Siliya

Minister of Foreign Affairs
- In office 12 January 2012 – 21 February 2013
- President: Michael Sata
- Preceded by: Chishimba Kambwili
- Succeeded by: Effron Lungu

Minister of Information and Broadcasting Services
- In office 29 September 2011 – 12 January 2012
- President: Michael Sata
- Preceded by: Ronnie Shikapwasha
- Succeeded by: Kennedy Sakeni

Personal details
- Born: 15 May 1963 (age 63) Zambia
- Party: UPND (2001 - 2006); Patriotic Front (2006 - present)
- Profession: Agriculturalist/Consultant

Given Lubinda is a Zambian politician who served in the Cabinet of Zambia as Minister of Justice, Minister of Foreign Affairs, Minister of Information and Broadcasting Services and Minister of Agriculture. He was the Member of Parliament in the National Assembly of Zambia for Kabwata Constituency in Lusaka District from 2001 to 2021. Lubinda is of mixed-race parentage. He was the current acting President of the Patriotic Front on several occasions between 2022 and 2026, having been appointed to the position by former President Edgar Lungu.

In January 2012 he bungee-jumped from the Victoria Falls bridge to restore confidence in the jump arrangements after Australian Erin Langworthy's rope broke during her jump. He has offered to jump again with Langworthy.

== Political career ==
Lubinda stood in Kabwata constituency at the 2001 general election as the United Party for National Development (UPND) MP candidate and was elected. At the 2006, 2011 and 2016 general elections, Lubinda stood in Kabwata as the Patriotic Front (PF) MP candidate and was elected.

Following the death of President Levy Mwanawasa in 2008, he came under criticism from both members of the ruling Movement for Multiparty Democracy and the opposition for voicing concerns on issues such as expenditure after the government planned and eventually increased salaries and allowances for both ministers and members of Parliament.

After Michael Sata was elected as the President of Zambia in September 2011, Given Lubinda was appointed as the Minister of Information, Broadcasting and Tourism in his first cabinet. On 12 January 2012, Lubinda was transferred to being the Minister of Foreign Affairs. On 21 February 2013, Lubinda was removed from his position as Minister of Foreign Affairs after being accused of leaking information to the opposition United Party for National Development (UPND), a party he previously belonged to. This was viewed as a result of pressure on the president to remove a potential successor by other ministers who were vying for the presidency.

After Sata's death in October 2014, Edgar Lungu was elected as the President of Zambia in January 2015 and the following month, Lungu appointed Lubinda as the Minister of Agriculture and Livestock. In October 2015, the ministry was split into the Ministry of Agriculture and the Ministry of Fisheries and Livestock and Lubinda was retained as the agriculture minister while Greyford Monde was appointed as the fisheries and livestock minister. After Lungu was re-elected as the President of Zambia in August 2016, Lubinda was appointed as the Minister of Justice and he remained as the Justice Minister up to the next election in 2021.

=== PF presidency ===
After the 2021 election, Lubinda became the vice-president of the Patriotic Front party. Soon after, President Lungu decided to retire from active politics and Given Lubinda was the acting president of the party going forward. However, Edgar Lungu returned to active politics in October 2023 and he was handed back the Patriotic Front presidency, with Lubinda being appointed as the party's vice-president once again (and was therefore the acting president in Lungu's absence).

In November 2024, the Patriotic Front officially joined the Tonse Alliance, with Lungu as the chairperson. After Lungu left Zambia for South Africa in early 2025 for medical purposes, Given Lubinda was appointed as the Tonse Alliance acting chairperson. After Lungu's death in June 2025, Lubinda continued to be the acting chairperson of the alliance and the acting president of the Patriotic Front going forward.

On 11 March 2026, the Patriotic Front, with Lubinda as the acting president, formed the PF Pamodzi Alliance and officially decided to exit from the Tonse Alliance due to internal disagreements. On 15 March 2026, Lubinda announced that after many delays, his PF faction would host a convention to choose their new leader within four days. The convention took place virtually on 21 March 2026 and the delegates that were present elected Makebi Zulu to be the president of the party faction with 49.2% of the vote, with Chitalu Chilufya getting 34.1% of the vote and Lubinda getting 8.7% of the vote. So, Lubinda would no longer be the acting president.
