= Zambia Alliance for Progress =

The Zambia Alliance for Progress (ZAP) was a political party in Zambia.

== History ==
The ZAP was formed in 1999 as a merger of six parties; including the Agenda for Zambia (AZ), the Labour Party, the Lima Party, the National Christian Coalition (NCC), the National Party (NP) and the Zambia Democratic Congress (ZDC), as well as the National Pressure Group NGO, and was headed by ZDC leader Dean Mungomba.

In 2001 it merged into the Zambia Republican Party (ZRP). However, after disagreements between Mungomba and Benjamin Mwila, the ZAP left the ZRP and re-registered in order to contest the 2001 National Assembly elections, but failed to win a seat. The AZ, NCC and NP also contested the 2001 elections in opposition to both the ZAP and the ZRP.
