= Kasama Central =

Constituency of the National Assembly of Zambia

Kasama Central is a constituency of the National Assembly of Zambia. It covers the central part of Kasama in Kasama District of Northern Province.

== List of MPs ==
Election year	MP	Party
Kasama
1964	Simon Kapwepwe	United National Independence Party
Seat abolished
1973	Frederick Walinkonde	United National Independence Party
1978	Fredrick Walinkonde	United National Independence Party
1983	Alfred Chilumba	United National Independence Party
1988	Daniel Kapapa	United National Independence Party
1991	Daniel Kapapa	Movement for Multi-Party Democracy
1996	Simon Mwila	Movement for Multi-Party Democracy
Kasama Central
2001	Tresphor Bwalya	Movement for Multi-Party Democracy
2006	Saviour Chishimba	Patriotic Front
2009 (by-election)	Geoffrey Bwalya Mwamba	Patriotic Front
2011	Geoffrey Bwalya Mwamba	Patriotic Front
2016	Kelvin Sampa	Patriotic Front
2021	Sibongile Mwamba	Patriotic Front
2026	Elasmous Chomba	National Reconciliation Party for Unity and Prosperity
