= Kasumbalesa =

Kasumbalesa may refer to:

- Kasumbalesa, Democratic Republic of the Congo: A town in Haut-Katanga Province, Democratic Republic of the Congo
- Kasumbalesa, Zambia: A town in Chililabombwe District, Copperbelt Province, Zambia.
