= Ministry of Foreign Affairs (Zambia) =

Government ministry of Zambia

The Ministry of Foreign Affairs and International Cooperation is a ministry in Zambia. It is headed by the Minister of Foreign Affairs, who is responsible for conducting foreign relations. (Homepage)

== List of ministers ==
The following is a list of Foreign Ministers of Zambia since the country gained independence in 1964:

No.	Name (Birth–Death)	Portrait	Tenure
1	Simon Kapwepwe (1922–1980)		1964–1967
2	Reuben Kamanga (1929–1996)		1967–1968
3	Elijah Mudenda (1927–2008)		1968–1969
4	Kenneth Kaunda (1924–2021)		1969–1970
	Moto Nkama (1937–1978) Minister of State		1969–1970
(3)	Elijah Mudenda (1927–2008)		1970–1973
5	Vernon Mwaanga (b. 1944)		1973–1975
6	Rupiah Banda (1937–2022)		1975–1976
7	Siteke Mwale (1929–2010)		1976–1978
8	Wilson M. Chakulya		1979–1980
9	Lameck Goma (1930–2005)		1980–1986
10	Luke Mwananshiku (1938–2003)		1986–1990
11	Benjamin Mibenge (b. 1942)		1990–1991
(5)	Vernon Mwaanga (b. 1944)		1991–1994
12	Remmy Mushota (1953–2000)		1994–1995
13	Christon Tembo (1944–2009)		1995–1996
14	Lawrence Shimba (?–1999)		1996–1997
15	Keli Walubita (b. 1943)		1997–2002
16	Katele Kalumba (b. 1952)		2002
17	Kalombo Mwansa (b. 1955)		2002–2005
18	Ronnie Shikapwasha (1947–2024)		2005–2006
19	Mundia Sikatana (1938–2012)		2006–2007
20	Kabinga Pande (b. 1952)		2007–2011
21	Chishimba Kambwili (b. 1969)		2011–2012
22	Given Lubinda (b. 1963)		2012–2013
23	Effron Lungu (b. 1952)		2013
24	Wilbur Simuusa		2013–2014
25	Harry Kalaba (b. 1976)		2014–2016
(25)	Harry Kalaba (b. 1976)		2016–2018
26	Joseph Malanji (b. 1965)		2018–2021
27	Stanley Kakubo (b. 1980)		2021–2023
28	Mulambo Hamakuni Haimbe (b. 1976)		2023–2026
