= Nakatindi Yeta Nganga =

Zambian politician

Member of the National Assembly for Nalikwanda
- In office 1964–1968
- Preceded by: Seat created
- Succeeded by: Morgan Simwinji

Parliamentary Secretary to the Minister of Labor and Social Development
- In office 1965–1966

Parliamentary Secretary to the Minister of Mines and Co-operatives
- In office 1966–1967

Parliamentary Secretary to the Minister of Co-operatives, Youth and Social Development
- In office 1967–1968

Member of the House of Chiefs
- In office 1968–1972

Personal details
- Born: 1922 Lealui, Northern Rhodesia
- Died: 1972 (aged 49–50) Zambia
- Party: UNIP

Nakatindi Yeta Nganga (1922–1972) was a Lozi aristocrat and Zambian politician. Jointly one of the first women elected to the National Assembly, she was also the country's first female junior minister.

== Biography ==
Nakatindi was born in Lealui; her father was Yeta III, the Litunga of Barotseland. She attended the Tiger Kloof Educational Institute in South Africa, and between 1952 and 1964 she served on the Mongu-Lealui District Education Authority. She was the first well-known woman in Barotseland to join UNIP, and was the first director of the UNIP Women's Brigade, a position she held until losing to Maria Nankolongo in internal elections in 1967. She contested the 1962 Legislative Council elections in the Zambezi national constituency, but was defeated by Job Michello of the Northern Rhodesian African National Congress.

In the 1964 general elections, Nakatindi ran in the Nalikwanda constituency and was elected to the Legislative Council, which became the National Assembly upon independence later in the year. Alongside Margret Mbeba and Ester Banda, she was a member of the first group of women to be elected to the legislature. She went on to become Parliamentary Secretary to the Minister of Labor and Social Development in 1966, the first woman to hold a junior ministerial position. The following year she was appointed Parliamentary Secretary to the Minister of Mines and Co-operatives, before becoming Parliamentary Secretary to the Minister of Co-operatives, Youth and Social Development in 1967.

Nakatindi remained a member of the National Assembly until losing her seat to Zambian African National Congress in the 1968 elections. She then became a member of the House of Chiefs and governor of Sesheke District, positions in which she served until her death in 1972.

Her daughter Nakatindi Wina, one of 11 children, later also served as an MP and minister.
