= ZCTU =

ZCTU may mean:

- Zambia Congress of Trade Unions
- Zimbabwe Congress of Trade Unions
