= Chililabombwe (constituency) =

Constituency of the National Assembly of Zambia

Chililabombwe is a constituency of the National Assembly of Zambia. It covers Chililabombwe in Chililabombwe District of Copperbelt Province.

== List of MPs ==
| Election year | MP | Party |
|---|---|---|
| 1968 | Nephas Mulenga | United National Independence Party |
| 1973 | Nephas Mulenga | United National Independence Party |
| 1978 | Palakasa Chiwaya | United National Independence Party |
| 1983 | Palakasa Chiwaya | United National Independence Party |
| 1988 | Mufo Nkunika | United National Independence Party |
| 1991 | Sikota Wina | Movement for Multi-Party Democracy |
| 1996 | Sikota Wina | Movement for Multi-Party Democracy |
| 2001 | Wamundila Muliokela | Movement for Multi-Party Democracy |
| 2006 | Esther Banda | Patriotic Front |
| 2011 | Esther Banda | Patriotic Front |
| 2016 | Richard Musukwa | Patriotic Front |
| 2021 | Paul Kabuswe | United Party for National Development |
| 2026 | Kabwe Lupele | Resolute Party |
