= Shomwa Shamapande =

Shomwa M. Shamapande
- Born: Lusaka, Zambia
- Education: University of Massachusetts Amherst; Columbia University (School of International and Public Affairs)
- Occupations: Government & Public Affairs Professional
- Political party: Democratic Party

Shomwa "Shom" Shamapande is a political and business consultant and strategist, who has worked in government affairs, media/communications and Democratic politics. In 1998, he served as an adviser to the South African Center for Human Rights in Pretoria. Shamapande was a Senior Adviser to Bill Lynch, former deputy mayor of New York City and Vice Chairman of the Democratic National Party and as a legislative fellow for Congressman Charles B. Rangel of Manhattan. Shomwa has also served as a communications and government adviser for the Campaign for Better Schools, the Democratic National Committee, and the United Nations Commission on Legal Empowerment of the Poor.

Shamapande has been the Communications Director for several political campaigns including the campaign of Dennis Mehiel, who was the 2002 Democratic Nominee for Lt. Governor of New York State. Shamapande worked as the Southern Nevada Field Director for the 2008 SEIU Obama for America Presidential Campaign under the campaign's Political Director Patrick Gaspard.

In 2005, Shamapande was appointed to the board of the United Nations Association New York City chapter.

== Legal trouble ==
In August 2005, Shamapande, while working under an aide to Nassau County Executive Thomas Suozzi, was charged with filing time-sheets for work he did not perform and taking roughly $12,000 in unearned wages.

Shamapande, who had worked previously in statewide and national Democratic campaigns, argued during the trial that he was involved in the early stages of County Executive Thomas Suozzi's run for governor including setting up a meeting with political consultant Bill Lynch, attending strategy meetings during the 2004 Democratic National Convention, and writing a "Fix Albany" campaign strategy memo for Mr. Suozzi's "Fix Albany" campaign. Shamapande's legal team argued, that the duties performed by Mr. Shamapande - while legal - could be politically embarrassing to County Executive Suozzi because they showed that Suozzi was spending a considerable amount of time and resources preparing to run for governor. Shamapande's attorney, Domonick Porco, argued that, "Shamapande, who had worked as a political consultant for state and national Democrats, was hired in 2003 to provide political assistance to Suozzi, then eying a run for governor," and his time-sheets were filed in that context. Mr. Porco contended further that, "Shamapande's county work was no different in 2005 than in 2004."

Shamapande's defense didn't call a single witness. Dominic Porco commented to Newsday, "This case was clearly politically motivated - anyone in the court room saw that. The prosecution wasn't even close to meeting its burden, so I felt no need to call any witnesses."

On December 2, 2006, after a week and a half of testimony, a Nassau county jury deliberated for less than one hour and found that the one-time Nassau County consultant "did not file false instruments nor defraud county taxpayers."

After the trial, Shamapande commented, "I am gratified that the jury returned a verdict so quickly, and that they understood what I went through -- not just during this trial but during this process."

In a 2012 interview, Shamapande remarked, "After being charged with a crime, I can tell you, I looked guilty...and I had to shut up and listen to my attorney because you don't want to tip off your best defense and hurt your own case."

== Personal life ==
Shomwa Shamapande is the son of Zambian 2001 presidential candidate Yobert Shamapande.

Shamapande is a lecturer at Howard University's Film & Television Department and was credited as a producer on a local Emmy winning short film.
