= Wamundila Muliokela =

Zambian politician

Member of the National Assembly for Chililabombwe
- In office 2002–2006
- Preceded by: Sikota Wina
- Succeeded by: Esther Banda

Minister of Defence
- In office 2005–2006

Deputy Minister of Defence
- In office 2002–2005

Personal details
- Born: 15 May 1942 (age 83)
- Political party: Movement for Multi-Party Democracy
- Profession: Sociologist

Wamundila Muliokela (born 15 May 1942) is a Zambian former politician. He served as Member of the National Assembly for Chililabombwe from 2002 until 2006, and as Minister of Defence between 2005 and 2006.

== Biography ==
Prior to entering politics, Muliokela worked as a sociologist. He contested the 2001 general elections as the Movement for Multi-Party Democracy candidate in Chililabombwe and was elected to the National Assembly after the incumbent Chililabombwe MP Sikota Wina decided to contest the Mulobezi instead. He was subsequently appointed Deputy Minister of Defence. In March 2005 he became Minister of Defence.

In the 2006 general elections he was defeated by Esther Banda of the Patriotic Front.
