= Chililabombwe =

Chililabombwe Bancroft
- Town
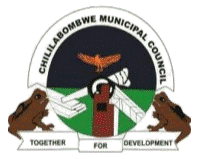
- Seal

- Location in Zambia
- Coordinates: 12°22′00″S 27°49′40″E
- Country: Zambia
- Province: Copperbelt Province
- District: Chililabombwe District

Government
  - Type: Municipal Council
  - Mayor: Lucky Sichone
- Elevation: 4,460 ft (1,360 m)

Population (2010)
  - Total: 90,530
  - Economic activity: Mining
  - Religions: Christian
- Time zone: UTC+2 (CAT)
- Postal code: 210028
- Area code: 10101
- Climate: Cwa

Chililabombwe (formerly named Bancroft) is a small town in Copperbelt Province, Zambia. It is located near the Democratic Republic of the Congo border. The name Chililabombwe means 'place of the croaking frog' in the local language of Lamba. Originally is called Bancroft after Canadian geologist, Dr. Joseph Austen Bancroft (1882-1957). The town has a population of 87 000 based on census data from 2010, making it one of the largest towns in the Copperbelt. The town is on the T3 road, 20 km north of the neighbouring town of Chingola, and approximately 17 km south of the large border market of Kasumbalesa. The town's main economic activity is copper mining.

Chililabombwe District also has small communities like Konkola. Konkola town is the home of Konkola Copper Mine.

== Politics ==
The current mayor is Lucky Sichone supported by the deputy mayor, Getrude Witola. The town is represented in the National Assembly by the Chililabombwe constituency and the current Member of Parliament is Paul Kabuswe.

== Mining ==
Chililabombwe has sixteen mines. The primary mine is Konkola Copper Mines. Konkola Copper Mine is one of Africa's largest copper producers, owned by Vedanta Resources Limited. Prior to privatization efforts in 2000, the mine was owned by ZCCM, a Zambian copper mining conglomerate. The Zambian government possessed a 60,3% stake in ZCCM. Lubambe Copper Mine, formerly known as Konkola North, is a mine operated by Australian private equity firm, EMR Capital Resources.

== Sport ==
Chililabombwe is the home of the Zambian football club, Konkola Blades. The team play their home games at the Konkola Stadium in Chililabombwe, which has a seating capacity of 25,000.

== See also ==
- Railway stations in Zambia
- Chingola
- Kitwe
- Ndola
