= Sibongile Mwamba =

Zambian politician (born 1980)

Honorable Sibongile Mwamba

Elected member of the National Assembly
- In office 15 August 2021 – 15 May 2026
- Succeeded by: Elasmous Chomba
- Constituency: Kasama Central

Personal details
- Born: 11 July 1980 (age 46) Ndola, Zambia
- Party: Patriotic Front (prior to 2021); UPND (2021 - present)

Sibongile Mwamba (born 11 July 1980) is a Zambian politician who served as the Member of Parliament for Kasama Central Constituency from August 2021 to May 2026. She has a diploma in diplomatic practice protocol and public relations as well as a certificate in hospitality, sales and marketing.

== Politics ==
Mwamba is a member of the Patriotic Front, which she joined early in life. From 2011 to 2013 she served as a Diplomat at the Namibian High Commission in Windhoek where she was the First Secretary for trade. In 2016 she stood on the United Party for National Development ticket in the Kasama Central parliamentary election but was unsuccessful. She was however adopted by the Patriotic Front to contest for the Kasama Central Parliamentary Constituency in 2021 and was elected to parliament in August that year. However, her seat was unconstitutionally nullified by the Kasama High Court. The Constitutional court overruled the judgement, making her return to parliament.

== Personal life ==
Mwamba is the daughter of former Zambian Defence minister Geoffrey Mwamba.
