= Ronnie Shikapwasha =

Zambian general and politician (1947–2024)

Reverend Lieutenant General Ronnie Shikapwasha

Minister of Information and Broadcasting Services
- In office 2008 – September 2011
- President: Rupiah Banda
- Preceded by: Vernon Mwaanga
- Succeeded by: Given Lubinda

Minister of Home Affairs
- In office October 2006 – 2008
- President: Levy Mwanawasa

Minister of Foreign Affairs
- In office January 2005 – October 2006
- President: Levy Mwanawasa
- Preceded by: Kalombo Mwansa
- Succeeded by: Mundia Sikatana

Minister of Home Affairs
- In office 9 February 2003 – January 2005
- President: Levy Mwanawasa

Zambia Airforce Commander
- In office 1991 – 1 December 1997
- President: Frederick Chiluba
- Preceded by: Herbert Simutowe
- Succeeded by: Sande Kayumba

Personal details
- Born: Ronald Shikapwasha; 25 December 1947 Northern Rhodesia (now Zambia)
- Died: 15 January 2024 (aged 76) Lusaka, Zambia
- Citizenship: Zambian
- Spouse: Jane Shikapwasha
- Children: 8
- Profession: Christian

Lieutenant General Ronald Shikapwasha (25 December 1947 – 15 January 2024) was a military officer and cabinet official from Zambia.

== Political career ==
Shikapwasha held that post from 2008 until his party, the Movement for Multi-Party Democracy (MMD,) lost the elections to the Patriotic Front in September 2011. A retired Lt General of the Zambia Air Force, he was previously the home affairs minister of Zambia, from 9 February 2003, until January 2005, when he switched positions with Kalombo Mwansa in a cabinet reshuffle and became foreign minister. He served as foreign minister for nearly two years, until another cabinet reshuffle in October 2006 which occurred after Levy Mwanawasa’s election to a second term as president. Shikapwasha returned to the position of home affairs minister and was replaced as foreign minister by agriculture minister Mundia Sikatana. Shikapwasha hailed from Zambia's Central Province and is believed to be a relative to the former First Lady of Zambia, Maureen Kakubo Mwanawasa.

== Military career ==
Before becoming Air Force Commander in 1991, Shikapwasha served as a diplomat and defence attache to Tanzania but fell out of favour with former president Kenneth Kaunda. During his tenure, former president Kaunda had the General investigated and found no wrongdoing. It is believed that he was sent back to Zambia where he was supposed to face charges but there was nothing to charge him on.

Shikapwasha served as the Zambia Air Force Commander under former president Frederick Chiluba. He was subsequently relieved from his duties while lying in a hospital in South Africa on the verge of death a month after the 1997 Zambian coup attempt.

== Personal life ==
Ronnie Shikapwasha was born on 25 December 1947. His education was of a military background, having attended training in England, Russia, China, former Yugoslavia, and India. Shikapwasha was world-travelled and once served as the first republican president's (KK) personal pilot. He had 8 children with his wife Jane. Shikapwasha was a staunch Christian.

Ronnie Shikapwasha died on 15 January 2024, a day after being shot by his wife at his home on 14 January 2024, at the age of 76.
