= Sylvia Bambala Chalikosa =

Zambian politician

Minister of Works and Supply
- In office July 2019 – August 2021
- President: Edgar Lungu
- Preceded by: Mutotwe Kafwaya

Member of the National Assembly for Mpika Central
- In office August 2016 – August 2021
- Preceded by: Mwansa Kapeya
- Succeeded by: Francis Robert Kapyanga

Personal details
- Born: 29 March 1964 (age 62) Zambia

Sylvia Bambala Chalikosa (born 29 March 1964) is a Zambian politician and a member of the Patriotic Front. She was the Member of Parliament for Mpika Central constituency from 2016 to 2021 and she was the Minister of Works and Supply from 2019 to 2021.

== Career ==
Chalikosa worked as an accountant at SawPower Company Limited. At the 2016 general election, she was the Patriotic Front (PF) candidate contesting for the Mpika Central seat in the National Assembly of Zambia and she won the seat. After being a member of the National Security Committee and Foreign Affairs Committee of the National Assembly, she was appointed by President Edgar Lungu to his cabinet in October 2016 and took over the post of Minister for Vice President Inonge Wina. In 2019, she was transferred by President Edgar Lungu to the office of the Ministry of Works and Supply.
