= Andrew Tayengwa =

Zambian politician

Honorable Andrew Tayengwa

Elected member of the National Assembly
- Incumbent
- Assumed office January 2022
- Preceded by: Levy Mkandawire
- Constituency: Kabwata

Personal details
- Born: Andrew Tayengwa; 3 March 1975 (age 51) Zambia
- Party: United Party for National Development

Andrew Tayengwa is a Zambian politician and Member of Parliament for Kabwata Constituency. A member of the United Party for National Development, he was elected to the position in 2022.

== Political career ==
In December 2021, following the passing of Levy Mkandawire in a road accident, the United Party for National Development adopted Tayengwa to contest in the Kabwata constituency by-election. The election took place on 20 January 2022 and Tayengwa was elected as the member of parliament for Kabwata constituency. Tayengwa got 13,574 votes while Clement Tembo of the Patriotic Front got 11,192 votes.

== Parliamentary work ==
He serves in the Zambian Parliament's parliamentary standing committees, including the Committee on Agriculture, Lands and Natural Resources and the Committee on Media, Information and Communications Technology.

== Education ==
Tayengwa is an accountant by profession. He holds a diploma in accountancy.
