= Zambia Democratic Congress =

Political party in Zambia

- Founder: Dean Mungomba & Derrick Chitala
- Founded: May 1995

The Zambia Democratic Congress (ZADECO), also known as the Zambia Development Conference, is a political party in Zambia.

== History ==
The party was established in May 1995 by former ministers Dean Mungomba and Derrick Chitala after they were sacked by President Frederick Chiluba. Mungomba was the party's presidential candidate in the 1996 general elections, finishing second in a field of five candidates with 13% of the vote. In the parliamentary elections the party nominated 141 candidates, receiving 14% of the vote but only winning two seats in the National Assembly.

In 1998 some members broke away to form the Zambia Democratic Party. In 1999 ZADECO joined the Zambia Alliance for Progress, which failed to win a seat in the 2001 general elections. It was subsequently part of the National Democratic Focus for the 2006 general elections, with the NDF winning a single seat.
