= Kapyanga =

Kapyanga is a surname. Notable people with the surname include:

- Francis Kapyanga (born 1987), Zambian politician
- James Kapyanga (1963–2021), Zambian politician
