= Kantanshi (constituency) =

Constituency of the National Assembly of Zambia

Kantanshi is a constituency of the National Assembly of Zambia. It covers the centre of Mufulira and a rural area to the north-east of the town in Mufulira District of the Copperbelt Province.

== List of MPs ==
Election year	MP	Party
1968	Wilson Chakulya	United National Independence Party
1973	Greenwood Silwizya	United National Independence Party
1978	MacDonald Mtine	United National Independence Party
1983	David Nkhata	United National Independence Party
1988	David Nkhata	United National Independence Party
1991	Elias Chipimo	Movement for Multi-Party Democracy
1996	Steven Chilombo	Movement for Multi-Party Democracy
2001	Danny Kombe	Movement for Multi-Party Democracy
2003 (by-election)	Alex Manda	Patriotic Front
2004 (by-election)	Yamfwa Mukanga	Patriotic Front
2006	Yamfwa Mukanga	Patriotic Front
2011	Yamfwa Mukanga	Patriotic Front
2016	Anthony Mumba	Independent
2021	Anthony Mumba	Patriotic Front
2026	Chanda Kabwe	Resolute Party
