= National Democratic Focus =

The National Democratic Focus (NDF) was a political alliance in Zambia.

== History ==
The alliance was formed in 2006 as the National Democratic Front, and was initially planned to consist of the Party for Unity, Democracy and Development (PUDD), the Patriotic Front (PF), the Reform Party (RP), the Zambia Development Conference (ZADECO) and the Zambia Republican Party (ZRP). After the PF pulled out prior to the final agreement being signed, the alliance was renamed "National Democratic Focus" and had five members, the All People's Congress Party (ACP), the PUDD, the RP, ZADECO and the ZRP. Only the ZRP had MPs, having won a single seat in the 2001 elections.

However, the new alliance quickly began to disintegrate; the Reform Party left the coalition in June, a move that NDF president Benjamin Mwila described as an "act of treachery". The PUDD pulled out after it was decided that the NDF would not nominate a presidential candidate for the 2006 elections, and the APC withdrew after a dispute between Mwila and Nevers Mumba.

In the National Assembly elections the NDF received 1% of the vote and won a single seat, taken by Mwila, who was elected in Nchelenge.

Mwila left the NDF in 2011 and switched his affiliation to the Movement for Multi-Party Democracy (MMD). The NDF did not contest the 2011 general elections.
