= Mpika North =

National Assembly constituency in Zambia

Mpika North is a constituency of the National Assembly of Zambia. It was created in 2026 when Mpika Central was split into two constituencies (Mpika South and Mpika North). It covers the northern part of Mpika District, including the town of Mpika.

== List of MPs ==
Election year	MP	Party
2026	Francis Kapyanga	National Reconciliation Party for Unity and Prosperity
