= Richard Musukwa =

Zambian politician

Minister of Mines and Minerals Development
- In office 2018–2021
- President: Edgar Lungu
- Succeeded by: Paul Kabuswe

Deputy Minister of Mines, Energy and Water Development
- In office 2015–2016

Member of the National Assembly for Chililabombwe
- In office 2016–2021
- Preceded by: Esther Banda
- Succeeded by: Paul Kabuswe

Member of the National Assembly for Wusakile
- In office 2011–2016
- Preceded by: Barnabas Chella
- Succeeded by: Pavyuma Kalobo

Personal details
- Born: 28 November 1970 (age 55)
- Party: Patriotic Front
- Profession: Teacher, miner, trade unionist

Richard Musukwa (born 28 November 1970) is a Zambian politician. He served as Member of the National Assembly for Wusakile from 2011 to 2016 and for Chililabombwe from 2016 to 2021. He also served as Deputy Minister of Mines, Energy and Water Development from 2015 to 2016, and as Minister of Mines and Minerals Development from 2018 to 2021.

== Biography ==
Prior to entering politics Musukwa worked as a teacher, miner and trade unionist.

He was chosen as Patriotic Front candidate for Wusakile for the 2011 general elections and was subsequently elected to the National Assembly with a 14,851-vote majority. In February 2015 he was appointed Deputy Minister of Mines, Energy and Water Development.

Prior to the 2016 general elections Musukwa was chosen as the Patriotic Front in Chililabombwe, and was re-elected to the National Assembly with a 6,159-vote majority. Following the elections he was appointed Chief Whip of the Patriotic Front government. In February 2018 he was made Minister of Mines and Minerals Development. He lost his seat in the 2021 general elections.
