= Peter Amos Siwo =

Zambian businessman

Peter Amos Mbiko Siwo (18 March 1931 – 14 February 1998) was one of the first black graduates in Northern Rhodesia, and a pioneering civil servant after the country achieved independence as Zambia.

== Early life and education ==
He was born in Siwo Village beside the Thandiwe Caves, near Chipata in Eastern Province. He was a pupil at Munali Boys Secondary School, Lusaka, and became Head Boy. At that time it was the only secondary school for black boys in the then Northern Rhodesia. He did his postgraduate studies at Columbia University, in New York. He studied at St Antony's College, Oxford University 1982-83.

== Career ==
He was the first black graduate to work at the Luansha Mines. Before independence, he lived in a little house in no man's land in the Copperbelt. They did not want to put him with the black miners in those tiny houses because he was a graduate, but they could not put him in a big house in the white area either because he was black.

He was the first chairman of Zambia Airways.

He was Permanent Secretary in the then Ministry of Power, Transport Works and Communications for about five years when Rhodesia's Unilateral Declaration of Independence was declared in 1965. It later split into three different ministries. As of 1973, he was Permanent Secretary in the Ministry of Works and Supply. He later won a libel case against the Times of Zambia newspaper over its reporting of his actions in this role, in a contract dispute between the ministry and the vehicle supplier TAW International Leasing, Inc. He was often quoted by the Times of Zambia.

As of 1987, he was the Education and Cultural Permanent Secretary. He chaired many meetings for United Nations Education committees and Commonwealth Education Conferences and World Bank meetings. He chaired and worked on the Education Reforms in Zambia and was the first Director of Examinations Board.

== Personal life ==
He married Sheila Gibson McHarrie at Glenluce Abbey, Wigtownshire, Scotland on 20 September 1979.
