= Sikota Wina =

Zambian politician (1931–2022)

Minister of Health
- In office 1964–1964
- Preceded by: Post created

Minister for Local Government
- In office 1964–1968

Minister of Information, Broadcasting and Tourism
- In office 1968–1973

Member of the Legislative Council for Copperbelt West
- In office 1962–1964
- Preceded by: Seat created
- Succeeded by: Hugh Stanley

Member of the National Assembly for Luanshya–Kalulushi
- In office 1964–1968
- Preceded by: Seat created
- Succeeded by: Seat abolished

Member of the National Assembly for Roan
- In office 1969–1973
- Preceded by: Ester Banda
- Succeeded by: Simfukwe Mulwanda

Member of the National Assembly for Chililabombwe
- In office 1991–2001
- Succeeded by: Wamundila Muliokela

Personal details
- Born: 31 August 1931; Mongu, Northern Rhodesia
- Died: 15 June 2022 (aged 90); Lusaka, Zambia
- Political party: UNIP (1959–1991); MMD (1991–2001); UPND (after 2001)
- Profession: Journalist

Sikota Wina (31 August 1931 – 15 June 2022) was a Zambian politician. He was a member of the Legislative Council and the National Assembly and the country's first Minister of Health. He also held the posts of Minister for Local Government and Minister of Information, Broadcasting and Tourism.

== Biography ==
Wina was born in Mongu in 1931. His father was Chief Minister to the Paramount Chief of Barotseland. He attended Kafue Training School and then Munali Secondary School in Lusaka, before going on to study at the University of Fort Hare in South Africa. However, he was expelled from the university due to his political activity.

Wina returned to Northern Rhodesia and worked in the Information Department of the colonial government, and in 1954 he was arrested for entering a whites-only restaurant. In 1956 he began working as a journalist, editing the African Life magazine. He was arrested again in March 1959 as part of a drive against "suspected subversives". After being released from detention in Bemba, he joined the United National Independence Party (UNIP) and became its publicity director.

In 1962 Wina was elected to the Legislative Council for Copperbelt West in the general elections that year. He subsequently became Parliamentary Secretary to Kenneth Kaunda when Kaunda was appointed Minister of Local Government. In the 1964 general elections he was elected in the Luanshya–Kalulushi constituency and was appointed Minister of Health in Kenneth Kaunda's government. He became Minister for Local Government later in the year. He was re-elected to the National Assembly in the 1968 general elections representing the Roan constituency after Luanshya–Kalulushi was abolished, and was appointed Minister of Information, Broadcasting and Tourism in December 1968.

Wina left politics in the 1970s. In 1984 he was arrested at Bombay Airport in India for alleged drug smuggling. According to Indian government prosecutors, he jumped bail and used a fake Sudanese passport to fly back to Lusaka under the name Hussein. Upon his return to Zambia, he claimed the drugs had been planted. Together with his wife, Wina was jailed in April 1985, but was released the following year without facing a trial.

After multi-party politics was introduced at the start of the 1990s, Wina became a member of the Movement for Multi-Party Democracy and was elected to the National Assembly in the Chililabombwe constituency in the 1991 general elections. Following the elections, he was appointed Deputy Speaker, but resigned from the post in 1994 after another drug-dealing scandal. He was re-elected in 1996, but defected to the United Party for National Development prior to the 2001 general elections and ran in the Mulobezi constituency. Although he was beaten by the MMD's Michael Mapenga, the result was overturned by the Supreme Court in September 2003 due to Mapenga using state resources during the election campaign. Wina contested the subsequent by-election, but was defeated by Mwiya Wanyambe of the MMD.

Wina is the brother of politician Arthur Wina. He was originally married to Glenda Puteho McCoo, an African-American, before marrying Mukwae Nakatindi, a politician and member of the Barotseland royal family, in the 1970s. Nakatindi died in 2012. Sikota died at the University Teaching Hospital in Lusaka on 15 June 2022.
