= Konkola =

- Town
- Location of Konkola in Zambia
- Coordinates: 12.2997525°S 27.7665824°E
- Country: Zambia
- Province: Copperbelt Province
- District: Chililabombwe District
- Time zone: UTC+2 (CAT)

Konkola is an area in Chililabombwe District, Copperbelt Province, Zambia, just south-west of the Kasumbalesa border with DR Congo. It has large copper reserves.

== Konkola Copper Mines ==
Konkola Copper Mines established a major mine in the area; it is now controlled by Vedanta.

== Konkola North ==
A new mine was started at Chililabombwe in October 2010; it is a joint venture between Vale and African Rainbow Minerals. Production is expected to reach 45000 tons of copper concentrate per year. Vale expects to export copper by rail through Mozambique.
