= Ministry of Defence (Zambia) =

Government ministry of Zambia

Department overview
- Formed: 24 October 1964
- Jurisdiction: Government of Zambia
- Headquarters: Cabinet Office, Independence Avenue, Lusaka, Zambia
- Website: www.mod.gov.zm

The Ministry of Defence is a ministry in Zambia. It is headed by the Minister of Defence and oversees the Zambian Defence Force and Zambia National Service.

== List of ministers ==
Portrait	Name (born-died)	Term of office			Political party	Ref.
Portrait	Name (born-died)	Took office	Left office	Time in office	Political party	Ref.
	Kenneth Kaunda	January 1964	January 1970	5–6 years	United National Independence Party	
	Alexander Grey Zulu (1924–2020)	January 1970	August 1973	2–3 years	United National Independence Party	
	Aaron Milner	August 1973	December 1973	4 months	United National Independence Party	
	Kenneth Kaunda	December 1973	1979	5–6 years	United National Independence Party	
	Alexander Grey Zulu	1979	1980	0–1 years	United National Independence Party	
	Wilson Chakulya	1981	1983	1–2 years	United National Independence Party	
	Clement Mwananshiku	1983	1985	1–2 years	United National Independence Party	
	Malimba Masheke (born 1941)	1985	1988	2–3 years	United National Independence Party	
	H. B. M. Lungu	1990	1990	0 years		
	Benjamin Mwila (1943–2013)	1991	1998	6–7 years	Movement for Multi-Party Democracy	
	Chitalu Sampa	1998	2001	2–3 years	Movement for Multi-Party Democracy	
	Michael Mabenga	2003	2003	0 years	Movement for Multi-Party Democracy	
	Wamundila Muliokela (born 1942)	2005	2006	0–1 years	Movement for Multi-Party Democracy	
	George Mpombo	2006	2008	1–2 years	Movement for Multi-Party Democracy	
	Kalombo Mwansa (1955–2020)	July 2009	2011	1–2 years	Movement for Multi-Party Democracy	
	Geoffrey Bwalya Mwamba (born 1959)	2011	23 December 2013	1–2 years	Patriotic Front	
	Edgar Lungu (1956–2025)	23 December 2013	25 January 2015	1 year, 33 days	Patriotic Front	
	Richwell Siamunene (born 1972)	11 August 2015	15 September 2016	1 year, 35 days	United National Independence Party	
	Davies Chama (born 1964)	15 September 2016	7 August 2021	4 years, 326 days	Patriotic Front	
	Ambrose Lufuma (born 1957)	8 September 2021	Incumbent	5 years, 50 days	United Party for National Development	
