= Yotham Muleya =

Yotam Muleya
Personal information
- Full name: Yotam Siachobe Muleya
- Nationality: Northern Rhodesian
- Born: 1940 Mudukula Village, Choma District, Northern Rhodesia
- Died: 23 November 1959 (aged 19) Michigan, United States

Sport
- Sport: Running
- Club: Hodgson Technical College

Yotam Siachobe Muleya (1940 – 23 November 1959) was a long-distance runner who represented Northern Rhodesia (now Zambia) and the Federation of Rhodesia and Nyasaland. Muleya broke racial barriers and opened a new era in Rhodesian sport when he beat the famous British four-minute miler, Gordon Pirie, by 100 yards in a three-mile race at Salisbury, Southern Rhodesia in December 1958.

== Biography ==
=== Early life ===
Muleya was born in Mudukula Village, in Pemba District which was under Choma District at that time in the then Northern Rhodesia, the fourth surviving son of Jam and Munsanda Siakwambwa. As his immediate elder brother had died in infancy, Tonga custom called for the next surviving child to be named after anything other than human, so he was named Siachobe after a beetle which is associated with rain and means the harbinger of good news.

He started school at Mudukula Primary School and was a keen runner from an early age, often racing the village dogs. The village was on hilly terrain, which aided his training, with his normal routine being an early morning 16 km run.

After completing his primary education, Muleya proceeded to Munali Secondary School in Lusaka and from there, qualified to Hodgson Training School where he enrolled as an apprentice motor vehicle mechanic in early 1958.

=== Career ===
It was at Hodgson that Muleya's career took off. He surprised many when he set a Northern Rhodesia & Federal record of 14: 57.2 in the 3-mile event on 27 May 1958. On the strength of this achievement, he was invited to compete against British distance star Gordon Pirie in a track meet at Salisbury, Southern Rhodesia, a segregationist stronghold on 6 December 1958. However, his skin colour almost saw him being barred by South Africa-born William DuBois, a dedicated white supremacist who served as chairman of the Southern Rhodesian Amateur Athletic and Cycling Union.

"Mister whatever-his-bloody-name-is – this 'Kaffir' – has never even sent in a formal application. And if he had, it would have been turned down," said DuBois, who, when reminded of Muleya's record, added scornfully, "We do not count Kaffirs' performances." The association overruled DuBois and declared that Muleya would be allowed to compete but not wholeheartedly, as he was excluded when white competitors were presented to the Governor before the race.

Muleya thus became the first African ever permitted to run in a track meet of the Southern Rhodesian Athletics Association. Running barefoot on the muddy 3-mile course, he kept pace with Pirie and eventually overtook him to win the race by 100 yards and, in the process, he set a new Rhodesian record of 14:48.5.

Muleya was seen as a hero as joyful spectators, black and white alike, bore him from the track in triumph on their shoulders, with one white tobacco farmer stating: "He may be black, but, by God, he's a Rhodesian."

Officials presented Pirie with a plaque to mark his visit, and he brusquely handed it over to Muleya. Said Negro Leader Stanlake Samkange: "Muleya did more for good race relations in under a quarter of an hour than hundreds of twittering interracialists have achieved in the last five years." DuBois was chastened, saying: "It was a great race. The day of multiracial athletics is here, I'm afraid." Muleya's victory was reported in the popular American magazine Sports Illustrated as making "a nice crack in Rhodesia's grim racial barrier."

Muleya's appearance not only broke the color bar, but his performance led to an educational exchange grant in the United States.

=== Death ===
On 16 November 1959, Muleya and white track star John Winter, the Southern Rhodesian quarter-mile champion, set off on 3-month scholarships at the Central Michigan College from Salisbury Airport. They arrived in the United States three days later and were scheduled to take part in their first sports meet on 23 November 1959 at East Lansing. They started off for East Lansing in the morning accompanied by American athlete Leroy Zimmer and a driver. At 8:30 AM, with the highway slippery and visibility reduced due to thick fog, their vehicle collided with another car near Mt. Pleasant, Michigan. Muelya, Winter, Zimmer and the driver of the vehicle were seriously injured, while the two occupants of the other vehicle died in the crash.

Doctors unsuccessfully attempted to save his life, and Muleya died that same evening while Winter died five days later. His remains were transported back home, and after the church service at Sikalongo mission, he was buried in his home village.

He was given a state funeral, and his younger brother Jesse represented the family at the open-air memorial service which was held at Hodgson Technical College.

== Tributes ==
Yotham Muleya Road and Yotham Muleya Primary School in Lusaka are named after Muleya. Leslie Rainey wrote a book about Muleya called "Runner From the Long Grass" and in his book "Running Wild" Pirie described Muleya as "a quiet, charming fellow and an excellent runner."
