= Mundia Sikatana =

Zambian politician (1938–2012)

Mundia Sikatana (6 March 1938 – 14 June 2012; Lusaka) was a Zambian politician, diplomat and lawyer.

== Career ==
In 2002, Siktana was appointed Minister of Agriculture. He and his government faced widescale media condemnation for banning genetically modified maize donations during a widescale famine in 2002. Upon the re-election of President Levy Mwanawasa in 2006, Sikatana was appointed foreign minister on 9 August 2006. On 22 August 2007, the former ally of Mwanawasa was fired as foreign minister with Mwanawasa citing Sikatana's declining health. However, on 3 September, Siktana refuted that claim, citing instead his reputation as an anti-Mugabe politician and Mwanawasa's better relationship with Mugabe following his appointment as head of the Southern African Development Community.

He trained as a lawyer and during the one party rule by the first president Kenneth Kaunda, Sikatana championed the cause for justice and the respect of human rights.

| Preceded by ? | Agriculture, Food and Fisheries Minister of Zambia; 2002-2006 | Succeeded by Ben Kapita |
| Preceded by Ronnie Shikapwasha | Foreign Minister of Zambia; 2006-2007 | Succeeded by Kabinga Pande |
