= Chushi C. Kasanda =

Zambian politician

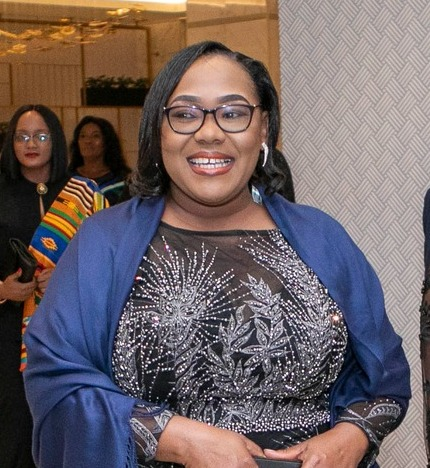

Minister of Information and Media
- In office 8 September 2021 – 24 September 2023
- President: Hakainde Hichilema
- Preceded by: Dora Siliya
- Succeeded by: Cornelius Mweetwa

Member of the National Assembly for Chisamba
- Incumbent
- Assumed office August 2016
- Preceded by: Moses Muteteka

Personal details
- Born: 15 February 1978 (age 48) Zambia
- Party: United Party for National Development
- Occupation: Business Marketer / sales / customer care

Chushi C. Kasanda (born 15 February 1978) is a Zambian politician. Kasanda is a member of the National Assembly of Zambia for Chisamba. She is a member of the United Party for National Development. She was the Minister of Information and Media from 8 September 2021 to 24 September 2023.
