= Munali Secondary School =

School in Lusaka, Zambia

Munali Secondary School is a state-funded secondary school located on the Great East Road in Lusaka, Zambia. Munali was the first secondary school for black students in Zambia's history.

== History ==
=== Colonial times ===
In colonial times, Munali was intended as Northern Rhodesia's principal school for talented native Zambians. The school was first established in 1938 as Entral Trade School. Founded in its own right in 1947 as "Munali secondary School" with about 40 pupils, it was originally situated at the David Kaunda campus at "Old Munali". In 1953 the school moved from Old Munali to its current campus at "New Munali".

After independence in 1964, the new Government Cabinet was composed almost entirely of alumni of Munali Secondary School. Notable amongst this cohort were Kenneth Kaunda, and brothers Sikota and Arthur Wina (dcd), the latter having been the husband of Zambia's former vice-president, Inonge Wina. Other famous alumni include former mayors of Lusaka and several businessmen.

Although all the students were black Zambians, the teachers in the early days were European. Early members of the original teaching staff included: W.C.Little, P.K.Stevenson, Bill Shakspere and H.T. Lyons.

(There was no apartheid as such in Northern Rhodesia, but until 1964 education was racially segregated, with separate schools for whites, blacks, "Indians" and "Cape Coloureds").

=== Modern times ===
The head teacher was Esau Nkhoma from (2021–2022) when Titus Hara was transferred there to head the school to date (2025) while Nomtimba Moyo Mulenga is currently the Deputy Head. The school's pass rate now one of highest in country: 88% in 2006. All standard school subjects are taught.

Munali Secondary School now has three branches: Munali Boys Secondary School, Munali Girls Secondary School and Munali School for the Deaf and Blind. The school's slogan is "Only the best is good enough for Munali." The school produced the entire 1964 Independence Cabinet of the first Republican President of Zambia, Kenneth Kaunda, who himself is a former "Munalian". The former President Rupiah Banda is also a former "Munalian". One unofficial slogan is "Once a Munalian, always a Munalian".

In 2025, with the roll out of Zambia's Competent Bases Curriculum (CBC), the Form One classes are called M, U, N, A, L, I, S and E while the grades 9's to 12 remain M, U, N, A, L, I, S, E and C. This nomenclature is derived from the name of the school: Munali Secondary School. 12M was known as the Kim Jong Il Class, named after the first President of the North Korea. The class had temporarily received financial support from the North Korean Embassy. The University of Zambia receives many students from Munali School. The school was a secondary school until 2001 when it became a high school. It only recently became a secondary school again after the education system was reorganised by the late President Michael Sata.

== Munali Boys Secondary School ==
The current headmaster is Hara, who took over from Nkoma in 2022. who took over from Phiri who also took over from Pwele in 2018, L. K. Yamboto in 2014. Chinkata took over from Saka, who was acting head for about three years.

All classes offer three mandatory subjects (Mathematics, English and Biology) and three optional subjects. There are three pure science classes: M, U and N. The other classes offer physical sciences.

== Munali Girls School ==
In 1994 girls were introduced into the junior school and in 2001, given own high school. The girls school was headed

== Funding ==
The school is funded by the Government of the Republic of Zambia. The country also has some privately funded schools, including convent schools and mission schools.

== Notable alumni ==
- Rupiah Banda, the fourth president of Zambia
- Dickson Jere, barrister, journalist, published author and political analyst specializing on African affairs
- Reuben Kamanga, the first vice-president of Zambia
- Emmanuel Kasonde, a Minister of Finance of Zambia
- Kenneth Kaunda, the first president of Zambia
- Ng'andu Peter Magande, former Secretary General of ACP Group of States and Minister of Finance and National Planning
- Elijah Mudenda, the second Prime Minister of Zambia
- Yotham Muleya, a long-distance runner
- Fwanyanga Mulikita, a Zambian minister
- Amusaa Mwanamwambwa, a former minister and Speaker of the National Assembly of Zambia
- Benjamin Mwila, a Minister of Defence of Zambia
- Peter Amos Siwo, a Zambian businessman
- Sikota Wina, the first Minister of Health of Zambia
- Alexander Grey Zulu, a former Zambian minister
