= Joel Chibuye =

Zambian politician

Member of the National Assembly of Zambia
- Incumbent
- Assumed office 14 August 2021
- Preceded by: Joseph Chishala
- Constituency: Roan

Personal details
- Born: August 8, 1968 (age 58)
- Party: Independent (prior to 2026); UPND (2026 - present)
- Occupation: Politician
- Profession: Human resource practitioner

Joel Chibuye (born 8 August 1968) is a Zambian politician and human resource practitioner who serves as the Member of Parliament for Roan constituency in the National Assembly of Zambia. He was first elected to Parliament as an independent candidate in the 2021 general election and retained his seat in the 2026 general election, contesting on the United Party for National Development (UPND) ticket. Chibuye holds a Grade 12 Certificate and a diploma in Human Resource Management (ABMA Level 4).
