= Chishimba Kambwili =

Zambian politician

Dr Chishimba Kambwili

Minister of Information and Broadcasting Services
- In office 5 February 2015 – 8 November 2016
- President: Edgar Lungu

Member of the National Assembly for Roan
- In office 28 September 2006 – 26 February 2019
- Preceded by: Cameron Pwele
- Succeeded by: Joseph Chishala

Personal details
- Born: 3 June 1969 (age 57) Luanshya, Copperbelt Province
- Party: MMD (1990–1996); Patriotic Front (2001–2018, 2021–2026); NDC (2018–2021)
- Spouse: Carol Kambwili
- Education: University of Hull

Chishimba Kambwili (born 3 June 1969) is a former member of the National Assembly of Zambia for Roan Constituency (2006 - 2019) in Luanshya District. He has also held several posts in the cabinet. He is the former leader of the National Democratic Congress.

He was born in Luanshya where he subsequently completed his education. Kambwili was also the National Youth Chairman for the Patriotic Front until December 2015.

== Political career ==
Kambwili stood as the Patriotic Front candidate in Roan Constituency in the 2006, 2011 and 2016 general elections and was elected in all three elections. After Michael Sata won the presidency at the 2011 election, Kambwili was first appointed as the Minister of Foreign affairs before being appointed as the Minister of Labour, then as the Minister of Sports and Youth and later as the Minister of Information and Broadcasting Services. He was also the spokesperson of the Patriotic Front government during his tenure.

In August 2015, Kambwili had threatened to fire the Zambia National Broadcasting Corporation after the agency started protesting his MP practices and by October of the same year revoked the license of Lusaka's Radio Phoenix, after assuming that some of their staff were supporting United Party for National Development candidates because there was absence of callers-in one of the station's programs.

In the 2016 election, Kambwili retained his MP seat from Roan Constituency and continued to serve as the Minister of Information and Broadcasting Services in the second cabinet of President Edgar Lungu.

On 8 November 2016 President Lungu fired Kambwili as Information Minister a few days after the president threatened to deal with corrupt officials in his Cabinet. In 2017, he was expelled from the party along with Mwenya Musenge for destabilization reports.

In 2018, Chishimba Kambwili was accused of using abusive language toward Zambian police and soldiers. On 23 March 2018, he was rushed to the University Teaching Hospital after collapsing at the Woodlands Police Station and was discharged from there a week later. On 27 February 2019, his seat was declared vacant by the Speaker of the National Assembly.

In April 2019, he was chosen as the president of the National Democratic Congress (NDC) party after already being the party's consultant for some time. The NDC was a member of the Opposition Alliance at the time. On 30 June 2020, Kambwili called on opposition parties in Zambia to form a grand opposition alliance ahead of the 2021 Zambian general election, citing the example of the 2020 Malawian presidential election.

In October 2020, Chishimba Kambwili was sentenced to prison for "forgery" by the Lusaka Court of First Instance. "In the first count, the convict was sentenced to 12 months and an additional 12 months for disseminating false documents," Magistrate David Simu Samba said in his judgment. Both sentences were to be executed simultaneously. He was acquitted of a charge of giving false information to an official.

In April 2021, Kambwili left the National Democratic Congress (NDC) party and rejoined the Patriotic Front (PF) party. He was part of the PF's campaign team ahead of the 2021 general election.

In 2022, Kambwili was one of the nine PF members who decided to contest for the party presidency after Edgar Lungu announced his retirement. Lungu was given back the title of PF president in October 2023, putting a halt to any plans for a convention. After Lungu's death in June 2025, acting party president Given Lubinda announced on 15 March 2026 that a convention will take place within a few days to choose a successor, with Kambwili as one of the candidates. The convention took place virtually on 21 March 2026 and the delegates that were present elected Makebi Zulu to be the president of the party faction with 49.2% of the vote, with Chishimba Kambwili getting getting 1.4% of the vote.

In May 2026, Kambwili was adopted by the Citizens First (CF) party led by Harry Kalaba to be their parliamentary candidate in Roan constituency in Luanshya District, where he was previously the member of parliament, in the 2026 general election to happen in August that year. However, in July 2026, Kambwili decided to endorse and join the campaign team of a different presidential candidate from Kalaba.
