= Margret Mbeba =

Zambian politician

Member of the National Assembly
- In office 1964–1968
- Constituency: Kazimuli

Personal details
- Political party: UNIP

Margret Safatiya Mbeba was a Zambian politician. She served as a member of the National Assembly for Kazimuli from 1964 to 1968 and was jointly one of the first elected female MPs in Zambia.

== Biography ==
A member of the United National Independence Party (UNIP), Mbeba contested the Kazimuli constituency in the January 1964 general elections as the UNIP candidate. She was elected to the Legislative Council, one of the three women elected alongside Ester Banda and Nakatindi Yeta Nganga. At independence later in 1964, the Legislative Council became the National Assembly. She lost her seat in the 1968 elections.
