= Paul Kabuswe =

Zambian politician (born 1973)

Honorable Minister Paul Kabuswe
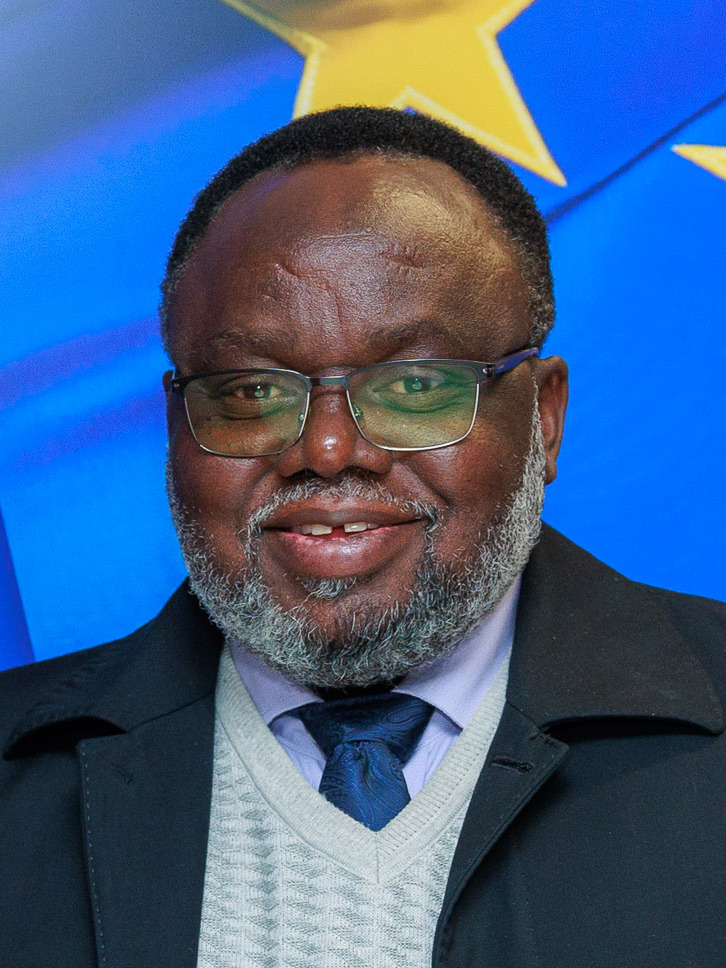
- Kabuswe in 2024

Minister of Mines and Minerals Development
- In office September 2021 – May 2026
- Preceded by: Richard Musukwa
- Succeeded by: Brenda Tambatamba

Member of Parliament
- In office August 2021 – May 2026
- Preceded by: Richard Musukwa
- Succeeded by: Kabwe Lupele
- Constituency: Chililabombwe

Personal details
- Born: 8 October 1973 (age 53) Zambia
- Party: United Party for National Development

Paul Chanda Chongo Kabuswe (born 8 October 1973) is a Zambian politician who served as the member of parliament for Chililabombwe Constituency from 2021 to 2026, during which he served as Zambia's Minister of Mines and Minerals Development.

== Early life and education ==
Kabuswe was born on 8 October in 1973. He holds a Bsc in Politics and International Relations.

== Career and politics ==
Kabuswe stood as the Patriotic Front candidate for ward councillor in Kakoso Ward in Chililabombwe District at the 2011 general election and he was elected. During that five-year term, he served as the mayor for Chililabombwe District from 2012 to 2016. In February 2021, he joined the United Party for National Development (UPND) and contested for the position of member of parliament for Chililabombwe constituency, which he won in August 2021. Kabuswe was named Minister of Mines and Minerals Development by President Hakainde Hichilema the following month. He took over from Richard Musukwa, who was the member of parliament for Chililabombwe from 2016 to 2021 and was also the mines minister during his parliamentary tenure. He decided to stand again in Chililabombwe constituency at the 2026 general election and finished second to Kabwe Lupele.
