= Esther Banda (politician) =

Zambian former politician

Member of the National Assembly for Chililabombwe
- In office 2006–2016
- Preceded by: Wamundila Muliokela
- Succeeded by: Richard Musukwa

Deputy Minister of Tourism and Arts
- In office 2015–2016

Deputy Minister of Gender and Child Development
- In office 2012–2015

Deputy Minister Local Government, Housing, Early Education and Environmental Protection
- In office 2011–2012

Personal details
- Born: 4 November 1958 (age 67)
- Party: Patriotic Front
- Profession: Sociologist

Esther Mwila Banda (born 4 November 1958) is a Zambian former politician. She served as Member of the National Assembly for Chililabombwe from 2006 until 2016, and was a Deputy Minister between 2011 and 2016.

== Biography ==
Banda studied for a BA in sociology and worked as a sociologist. She contested the 2001 general elections as the United Party for National Development candidate in Chililabombwe, but came second to Movement for Multi-Party Democracy candidate Wamundila Muliokela. In the 2006 general elections Banda was the Patriotic Front candidate and defeated Muliokela (who was then Minister of Defence), becoming the constituency's MP. She was re-elected in the 2011, after which she was appointed Deputy Minister Local Government, Housing, Early Education and Environmental Protection. The following year she became Deputy Minister in the newly created Ministry of Gender and Child Development. In February 2015 she became Deputy Minister of Tourism and Arts after Edgar Lungu became president. She also held the position of National Women's Chairperson within the Patriotic Front.

Banda did not run in the 2016 general elections, and was succeeded as Chililabombwe MP by the PF candidate Richard Musukwa.

== Value addition in mining policy ==
In 2014, Banda called on mining companies in the Copperbelt and North-Western provinces to establish value-addition industries within Zambia's Multi-Facility Economic Zones (MFEZs). She stated that Zambia needed to benefit more directly from its natural resources by processing minerals locally rather than exporting them in raw form. Speaking both as Member of Parliament for Chililabombwe and as Deputy Minister of Gender and Child Development, Banda emphasized that such economic diversification would create jobs and generate higher national income.
