= Kasumbalesa, Democratic Republic of the Congo =

Congolese town

Kasumbalesa
- Location in Democratic Republic of the Congo
- Coordinates: 12°15′23″S 27°48′10″E
- Country: Democratic Republic of the Congo
- Province: Haut-Katanga
- Elevation: 4,660 ft (1,420 m)

Population (2004 Estimate)
  - Total: 47,213
- Climate: Cwa

Kasumbalesa is a border town in the Democratic Republic of the Congo. It sits across the international border from the much smaller town of Kasumbalesa, Zambia.

== Location ==
Kasumbalesa is located in Haut-Katanga Province, approximately 100 kilometres (62 mi), south-east of Lubumbashi, the provincial headquarters. The geographical coordinates of Kasumbalesa are: 12°15'23.0"S, 27°48'10.0"E (Latitude:-12.256389; Longitude:27.802778). Kasumbalesa sits at an average elevation of 1,420 metres (4,659 ft) above sea level.

== Population ==
The national census, conducted on 1 July 1984, enumerated the population of the town at 31,773 people. As of 1 July 2004, the town's population was estimated at 47,213.

- The 1984 census data is sourced from the National Institute of Statistics of the Democratic Republic of the Congo.
- The 2004 population estimate is sourced from the United Nations Organization Stabilization Mission in the Democratic Republic of the Congo.

== Overview ==
Kasumbalesa is a major crossing point for both human traffic and cargo for both Democratic Republic of the Congo and Zambia. It is the main conduit of trade that amounted to US$575 million that DR Congo imported from Zambia compared to US$1.7 billion that Zambia imported from its northern neighbor, based on 2015 data. An average of over 500 long-haul cargo trucks are cleared daily in each direction. In April 2019, the traffic at the border crossing snarled, leading to congestion on both sides of the border.

== See also ==
- Southern African Development Community
