= Kabinga Pande =

Zambian politician

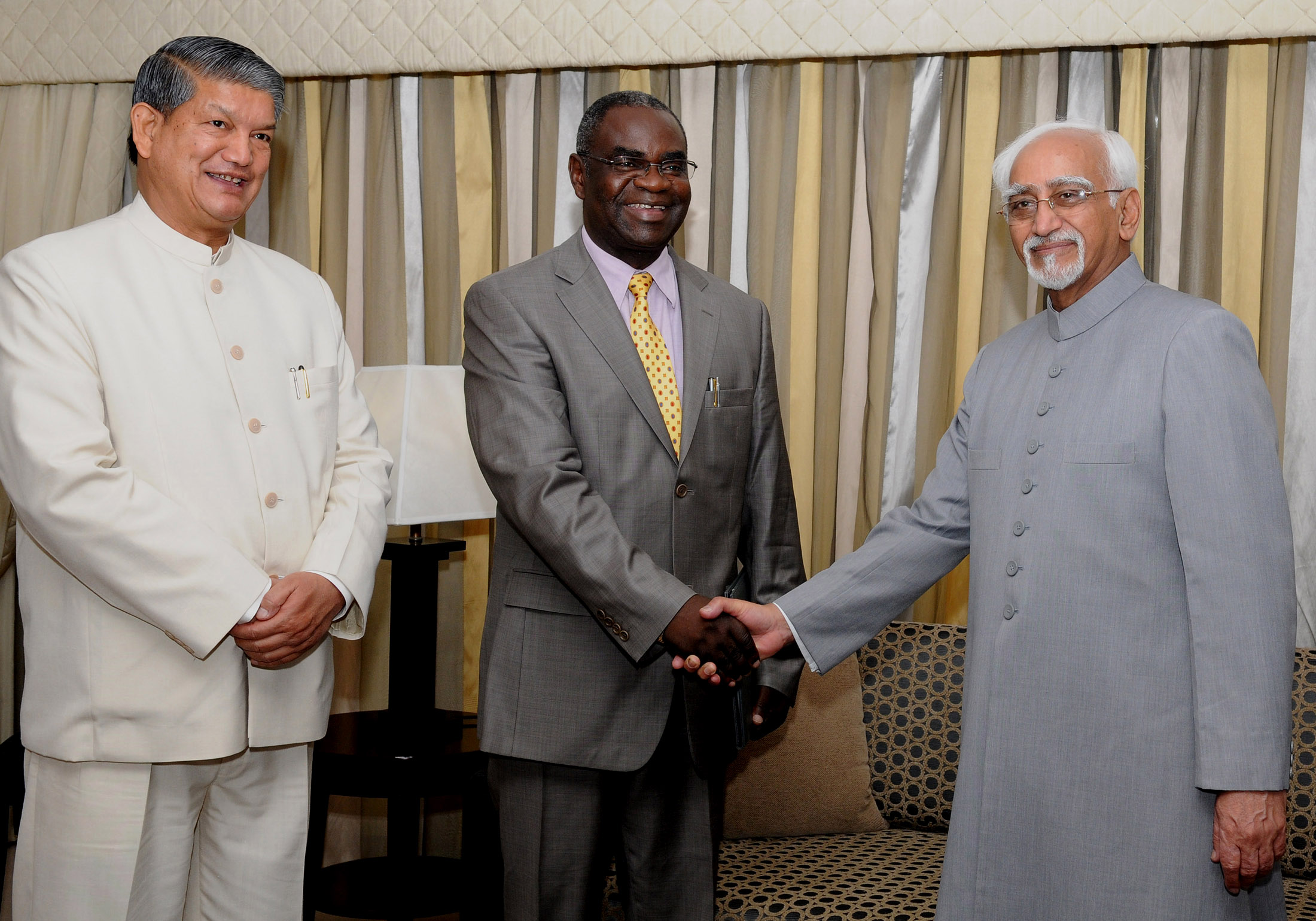
Kabinga Pande having a meeting with the Vice President

Kabinga Jacus Pande (born 5 March 1952) is a Zambian politician. Pande was appointed to the position of foreign minister in August 2007, replacing Mundia Sikatana. Pande had previously been the tourism minister. He held the Foreign Minister portfolio until 2011 when his party the Movement for Multi-Party Democracy (MMD) was dislodged by the Patriotic Front (PF) and was succeeded by Chishimba Kambwili.

Preceded by Mundia Sikatana	Foreign Minister of Zambia; 2007-2011	Succeeded by Chishimba Kambwili
