= Mpika South =

National Assembly constituency in Zambia

Mpika South is a constituency of the National Assembly of Zambia. It was created in 2026 when Mpika Central was split into two constituencies (Mpika South and Mpika North). It covers the southern part of Mpika District.

== List of MPs ==
Election year	MP	Party
2026	Primrose Chanda	National Reconciliation Party for Unity and Prosperity
