= Vernon Mwaanga =

Zambian politician

Vernon Johnson Mwaanga (born 25 June 1944) is a Zambian diplomat and politician.

== Life ==
Born near Choma, Mwaanga studied political science and international relations in the United Kingdom. In October 1964 he became Zambia's first diplomat, as deputy high commissioner in London. He was ambassador to Moscow in 1965, before returning to Zambia for two years, handling negotiations with Rhodesia as the president's permanent secretary. From 1966 to January 1972 Mwangaa was ambassador to the United Nations. In 1972 he was appointed editor of the Times of Zambia. From 1973 to 1975 he was Minister of Foreign Affairs. During his tenure as foreign affairs minister for the Kenneth Kaunda regime, he played a key role in Zambian relations with the United States. Partly because of his diplomatic efforts, Kaunda was invited to the White House for important talks with Gerald Ford in April 1975. Furthermore, it was Mwaanga who first invited U.S. secretary of state Henry Kissinger to come to Zambia, which Kissinger ended up doing several times in 1976 to deliver a landmark speech and participate in discussions regarding the Rhodesian conflict.

In 1976 Mwaanga left politics for the private sector. In 1980 he became chairman of the new Zambian subsidiary of the Bank of Credit and Commerce International. As chairman of the Zambia Industrial and Commercial Association (ZINCOM), a consortium of entrepreneurs, he published criticisms of the government. Arrested on charges involving the alleged smuggling of Mandrax in 1985, he resigned the chairmanship of BCCI-Zambia, although the charges were never proven and he was released without trial in April 1986.

Mwaanga was a founding member of the Movement for Multi-Party Democracy (MMD), and Member of Parliament for Roan Constituency in Luanshya from 1991 to 2001. Following MMD's victory in the 1991 elections, Mwaanga served as Minister of Foreign Affairs from 1991 to 1994. He was Minister of Information from 1999 to 2002. After the 2006 elections he was reinstated as Minister of Information until his resignation in April 2007 over video footage showing him supporting breach-of-contract claims being made by a Congolese governor against the Zambian government.

== Chronology ==
- 1944 - Born, June 25
- 1964 - Deputy High Commissioner
- 1965 - Ambassador to the Soviet Union
- 1968 - Ambassador to the United Nations
- 1973 - Minister of Foreign Affairs (Zambia)
- 1976 - Left politics

== Books ==
- An Extraordinary Life, Multimedia Publications, 1982. No ISBN
- The Other Society : A Detainee’s Diary, Fleetfoot Pub. Co., c1986. No ISBN
- The Long Sunset : My Reflections, Fleetfoot Pub. Co., 2008. ISBN 9982-8510-0-4
