= Yobert K. Shamapande =

- Born: Chibombo District, Zambia
- Education: Columbia University (M.S. & PhD); California State Polytechnic University, Pomona (B.S)
- Occupation: Development economist
- Political party: National Leadership for Development

Yobert K. Shamapande is a Zambian international development economist, politician and author who was born to peasant parents and raised in the rural Chibombo District of central Zambia. He received his early education in the rural areas as well as in Lusaka, Zambia's capital city.

In 2001, Shamapande ran for president of Zambia on the ticket of the National Leadership for Development party of which he was one of the founding members. Thereafter, he co-founded and served as chairman & CEO of Global Development Partners, an international development consulting firm based in Washington D.C., with offices in New York and South Africa.

== United Nations ==
Prior to entering politics, Shamapande had more than three decades of professional leadership in the economic development field. He served for twenty-one years in various senior capacities with the United Nations stationed at the UN headquarters in New York as well as in South Africa

He was first recruited into the United Nations in 1980 by the former Finnish President Martti Ahtisaari who was then serving as the UN Commissioner for Namibia. Shamapande worked for a decade until 1990 as Senior Economist, Executive Assistant, and chief economic advisor to Ahtisaari and subsequent UN Commissioners for Namibia focusing on management and policy as well as strategic planning for the decolonisation of Namibia from apartheid South Africa. He was instrumental in organising planning workshops and conferences on Namibia as well as in designing and drawing up of Namibia's blue print for its post-independence reconstruction and development. In the 1980s, at the height of military conflicts in Southern Africa, Shamapande undertook several trouble-shooting efforts including leading UN missions of economic assistance to the "Frontline States" – neighbouring countries impacted by the apartheid South African destabilisation activities.

From 1996 until 1999 he was appointed by then UN Secretary General Boutos Boutros-Ghali as Director – Chief of mission – to establish a new United Nations Information Center in South Africa. He was charged with the responsibility of supporting South Africa's post-apartheid transformation and serving as "the United Nations voice" in promoting that country's reintegration into the international community.

Following his return to the UN Headquarters in 1999, he served until December 2000, as Chief of the UN Development Business, a UN-corporate sector partnership program with offices in New York and at the World Bank in Washington D.C. His responsibilities included promoting international investment activities financed by the leading multilateral institutions including the World Bank, Latin American Development Bank, European Bank for Reconstruction and Development, Caribbean Development Bank, African Development Bank, UNDP and others.

== Research ==
In the field of research, Shamapande has written and published extensively. From 1990 until 1996, he served as Chief Editor and supervised a complex research-publication program of the Yearbook of the United Nations, the most authoritative, flagship reference book about the international work of the United Nations and its various agencies. In that capacity, he edited and published seven volumes of the Yearbook including the Secretary-General’s .1995 special edition to commemorate the UN fiftieth anniversary.

== Teaching ==
Academically, he has given several public lectures relating to current development issues and taught at various institutions in the United States and South Africa, including as Adjunct Professor of International Affairs at Columbia University, where he taught a course on: “Political economy of poverty and development in Southern Africa;” as well as Assistant Professor of Urban and Regional Planning at California State Polytechnic University, San Luis Obispo; seminar/workshop at the New School University, New York, .and others. Most recently he has self-published a book through AuthorHouse Why Bother About the Poor? The Politics of Poverty, Peace and Development in Southern Africa'.

== Early career ==
Shamapande was the first Zambian Town Planning Officer for the City of Lusaka with the overall responsibility of co-ordinating the City's master planning, growth, development management and control.

== Education ==
Shamapande is a graduate with a B.S degree in urban and regional planning from California State Polytechnic University, Pomona; and Masters and PhD in development economics from Columbia University, New York.
