= Ester Banda =

Zambian politician

Member of the National Assembly
- In office 1964–1968
- Preceded by: Hendrick Liebenberg
- Succeeded by: Sikota Wina
- Constituency: Roan

Personal details
- Political party: UNIP

Ester Banda was a Zambian politician. She served as a member of the National Assembly for Roan from 1964 to 1968 and was jointly one of the first elected female MPs in Zambia.

== Biography ==
A member of the United National Independence Party (UNIP), Banda was appointed Under-Secretary of the Women's Brigade, having rallied support for the party in Ndola.

In the January 1964 general elections, Banda contested the Roan constituency as the UNIP candidate, and was elected to the Legislative Council, one of the three women elected alongside Margret Mbeba and Nakatindi Yeta Nganga. At independence later in 1964, the Legislative Council became the National Assembly. She lost her seat in the 1968 elections and later served as a district governor and UNIP's provincial secretary in Copperbelt Province.
