= Nakatindi Wina =

Zambian politician

Minister for Community Development and Social Welfare
- In office 1993–1994
- President: Frederick Chiluba

Minister of State for Tourism
- In office 1992–1993
- President: Frederick Chiluba

Personal details
- Born: 15 February 1945
- Died: 5 April 2012 (aged 67) Johannesburg, South Africa
- Party: Movement for Multi-Party Democracy
- Spouse: Sikota Wina
- Children: 11
- Profession: Politician

Princess Naganda Nakatindi Wina (15 February 1945 – 5 April 2012) was a Zambian politician and a member of the royal family of Barotseland.

== Early life ==
Princess Naganda Nakatindi Wina was born Mukwae Nakatindi into the royal family of Barotseland, the granddaughter of King Yeta III of the Lozi people. Nakatindi was the daughter of Nakatindi Yeta Nganga and Induna Yuyi Nganda; one of 11 children.

== Political career ==
After multi-party politics was introduced at the start of the 1990s, she joined the Movement for Multi-Party Democracy and in 1992 she became a Minister herself when she was named as Minister of State for Tourism. The following year she became Minister for Community Development and Social Welfare until 1994.

=== Controversies ===
During the early 1990s, there was a series of drug importation scandals related to MMD politicians. Steve Denning of the World Bank recommended to Frederick Chiluba, President of Zambia, deal with the situation. Nakatindi Wina was linked to the scandal by the Zambian press, but Chiluba refused to fire her. He instead, blamed the media for exaggerating the situation. However, he later on imprisoned her in 1998, after she was linked to the 1997 Zambian coup d'état attempt. She was held in Mukobeko prison, where her husband, Induna Sikota Wina, stayed with her. He blamed politician Michael Sata for lying to Chiluba to point blame at Nakatindi Wina.

In 2000, she called on women to boycott the African Union due to a lack of gender equality in the representatives; as each country was only required to include one woman as a minimum in representative groups. She said that the male leaders only wanted women to be "colouring flowers" in the Union.

== Health and death ==
In 2012, she was diagnosed with a heart condition and was transferred to a hospital in Johannesburg, South Africa. She died following an operation on 5 April 2012. Her son, Wina Wina, later thanked the South African authorities for allowing her to receive treatment there.
