= Levy Mkandawire =

Zambian politician (1961–2021)

Levy Mkandawire (5 May 1961 – 18 November 2021) was a Zambian politician from the United Party for National Development who served as Mayor of Lusaka and Member of Parliament for the Kabwata constituency.

== Death ==
He was run over and killed outside his home in November 2021. In June 2022, a man pleaded guilty for causing death by dangerous driving. He was succeeded in a by-election by Andrew Tayengwa.
