= Geoffrey Bwalya Mwamba =

Zambian politician

Minister of Defence of Zambia
- In office 2011–2013
- President: Michael Sata
- Preceded by: Kalombo Mwansa
- Succeeded by: Edgar Lungu

Member of Parliament for Kasama Central
- In office 16 October 2009 – 10 August 2016
- Preceded by: Saviour Chishimba
- Succeeded by: Kelvin Sampa

Personal details
- Born: 15 March 1959 (age 66)
- Political party: Patriotic Front (current); UPND (2015 - 2019)

Geoffrey Bwalya Mwamba (born 15 March 1959), known popularly as GBM, is a Zambian businessman and politician who served as Member of Parliament for Kasama Central from 2009 to 2016. He later served as Vice President of the United Party for National Development. Under the Patriotic Front government of President Michael Sata, he served as Minister of Defence from 2011 to 2013.

== Political career ==
On 27 July 2009, Saviour Chishimba resigned as the Kasama Central Member of Parliament and left the Patriotic Front (PF) party. A by-election was held on 15 October 2009 for the Kasama Central seat and Geoffrey Bwalya Mwamba (GBM) was chosen as the PF candidate for this election. Mwamba was victorious and the PF retained the Kasama Central seat. At the 2011 general election, he stood again as the PF candidate for Kasama Central and retained the seat.

President Michael Sata appointed Mwamba as the Minister of Defence in his initial cabinet. However, Mwamba decided to resign from being the defence minister in December 2013. Mwamba was expelled from the Patriotic Front party in February 2014, although he did not vacate his position as MP for Kasama Central until the term was complete in 2016.

Ahead of the 2015 presidential election, Mwamba decided to support Hakainde Hichilema of the United Party for National Development (UPND). On 23 July 2015, he once again endorsed the main opposition party, the UPND, and was appointed as the vice-president for administration of the party. On 3 June 2016, he was selected to stand as the running mate of UPND candidate Hakainde Hichilema in the August 2016 presidential election, where the party finished as the runner-up.

In 2019, he unceremoniously left the United Party for National Development and returned to the Patriotic Front party, where he was appointed as the Northern Province Presidential Campaign Manager for Edgar Lungu ahead of the 2021 general election.
