= Times of Zambia =

Zambian daily newspaper

The Times of Zambia is a national daily newspaper published in Zambia and headquartered in Ndola.

During the colonial period the newspaper was known firstly as The Copperbelt Times and then The Northern News. At that time, it was a twice-weekly newspaper aimed at a European readership.

== History and overview ==
In 1943, a small printing plant owned by Mr Roy Lentin, situated in Ndola, was sold to Mr Edward Brockman Hovelmeier (1908-2005) and Mr. Wykerd for the purpose of printing small items in their spare time. Mr. Edward Brockman Hovelmeier had experience with print, having been in the advertising field in Johannesburg before relocating to the Copperbelt as a result of the great economic depression so the plant became his direct responsibility.

The plant was of a very limited size, comprising two small platen printing machines, other subsidiary items such as a small paper cutter (guillotine), stapler, stitcher etc., also three or four cabinets of type of various fonts and sizes. The Plant was subsequently moved from Ndola to Chingola and opened for business in a corrugated-iron structure which had been a store room owned by Mr. B.I. Menashe, a prominent storekeeper in Chingola. They commenced with production of invoices, cards, small leaflets and other items however their range was limited by the size of the small platen printing machines. Shortly after opening they bought a Phoenix press which enabled them to print larger pieces and eventually a newspaper.

They were fully occupied with setting for job printing, when they were cajoled by ambition and desire to help Mr. Roy Welensky into starting a weekly newspaper the “Copperbelt Times”. There were difficulties with this as their facilities, particularly in the setting of the type, did not allow for this increase in operations. To build the circulation of the Copperbelt Times, it was necessary to have a more central location as Chingola was at the end of the railway line and there were no developed centres beyond it. It was therefore decided to relocate the plant to Ndola.

Under the direction of Mr. Edward Brockman Hovelmeier the business was taken to the commercial centre (at that time) of Northern Rhodesia. They were able to obtain from the Custodian of Enemy Property, a building which had been used by the German community of the area as a social centre and it was there that the name of the newspaper was changed from the “Copperbelt Times” to the “Northern News”. The equipment was loaded into a railway truck and went by rail to Ndola. They did not miss an issue of the paper in its transferral.

In the new structure Edward Brockman Hovelmeier was co-owner, works manager, editor, investigative reporter, social-items specialist, advertising salesman and layout artist which he eventually relinquished as well as his financial interest in the News Paper to Roy Welensky.

It was later owned by the South African newspaper chain Argus. Under the ownership of Tiny Rowland's company Lonhro, it was renamed the Times of Zambia on 1 July 1965 as a part of Richard Seymour Hall being appointed editor. Richard Hall Africanised the Times of Zambia in the same way as he had the African Mail by training Zambian printers and journalists with a view to making it truly Zambian. To do this effectively Richard Hall became a Zambian citizen, he resigned in August 1967. Criticism of the government under the later editorships including that of Dunston Kamana continued in the early 1970s eventually leading to the government intervening to appoint its own editor, Vernon Mwaanga, in 1972. United National Independence Party (UNIP), Zambia's former ruling party, took the newspaper over in 1975.

When the Movement for Multiparty Democracy (MMD) came to power in November 1991, it went to court claiming UNIP had illegally taken over the newspapers. The courts found in favour of the MMD, and ruled that the papers' ownership be transferred to the Zambian Government. The Times of Zambia is now owned by the Zambian Government.

The newspaper recently went online in English and the site is currently under development. It publishes the Sunday Times of Zambia every Sunday.

The newspaper has its headquarters at Kabelenga Avenue in Zambia's second largest city Ndola.
