= Ministry of Mines and Minerals Development =

Government ministry of Zambia

The Ministry of Mines and Minerals Development is a ministry in Zambia. It is headed by the Minister of Mines and Minerals Development.

In 2012, the Ministry of Mines merged with the Ministry of Water and Energy to form the Ministry of Mines, Energy and Water Development. The merger was reversed in 2015, with the Ministry of Energy and Water Development being declared a separate ministry.

== List of ministers ==
Minister	Party	Term start	Term end
Minister of Labour and Mines
John Roberts	United Federal Party	1959	1961
H.L. Jones	Nominated member	1961	1962
Charles Cousins	Nominated member	1962	1962
Reuben Kamanga	United National Independence Party	1962	1964
Justin Chimba	United National Independence Party	1964	
Minister of Mines and Cooperatives
Alexander Grey Zulu	United National Independence Party	1965	1967
Minister of Lands and Mines
John Mwanakatwe	United National Independence Party	1967	1969
Minister of Mines and Mining Development
Humphrey Mulemba	United National Independence Party	1970	1973
Minister of Mines and Industry
Andrew Kashita	Movement for Multi-Party Democracy	1973	1975
Minister of Mines and Minerals Development
Christopher Yaluma	Patriotic Front	2015	2018
Richard Musukwa	Patriotic Front	2018	2021
Paul Kabuswe	United Party for National Development	2021	2026

=== Deputy ministers ===
Deputy Minister	Party	Term start	Term end
Deputy Minister of Mines, Energy and Water Development
Richard Musukwa	Patriotic Front	2015	2016
