= National Progressive Party (Zambia) =

The National Progressive Party was a political party in Zambia led by John Roberts.

== History ==
The party was established in April 1963 as a Northern Rhodesian successor to the United Federal Party. It won all 10 seats reserved for Europeans in the 1964 general elections. However, with the reserved seats due to be abolished before the 1968 elections, the party dissolved itself in August 1966, with its MPs sitting as independents until the end of the terms.
