= Fackson Shamenda =

Zambian trade unionist and politician

Fackson U. Shamenda (born 18 September 1950) is a Zambian trade unionist and politician.

Shamenda worked for the postal service, and in 1979 he became the leader of the National Union of Communication Workers. In 1982, he became the regional representative for the Postal, Telegraph and Telephone International, then from 1994 he served as its African representative.

In 1991, Shamenda was elected as president of the Zambia Congress of Trade Unions, and also as president of the Southern Africa Trade Union Co-ordination Council. In 2000, he was elected as president of the International Confederation of Free Trade Unions, the only African ever to hold the post.

Shamenda was a supporter of the Patriotic Front. In 2011, he stood down from his trade union posts, and was elected to the National Assembly of Zambia, representing Ndola Central. He was immediately appointed Minister of Labour and Social Security, and served until 2015, when he retired.

Trade union offices
Preceded by Frederick Chiluba	President of the Zambia Congress of Trade Unions; 1991–2002	Succeeded by Leonard Choongo Hikaumba
Preceded by Roy Trotman	President of the International Confederation of Free Trade Unions; 2000–2004	Succeeded by Sharan Burrow
Assembly seats
Preceded by Mark Mushili	Member of the National Assembly for Ndola Central; 2011–2015	Succeeded by Emmanuel Mulenga
Political offices
Preceded by Austin Liato	Ministry of Labour and Social Security; 2011–2015	Succeeded by Joyce Nonde-Simukoko
