= Joyce Nonde-Simukoko =

Zambian politician

Minister of Labor and Social Security
- Incumbent
- Assumed office 15 September 2016
- President: Edgar Lungu
- Preceded by: Fackson Shamenda
- Constituency: None (Nominated MP)

Personal details
- Born: Zambia
- Occupation: Politician

Joyce Nonde-Simukoko is a Zambian politician. She was appointed the Minister of Labour and Social Security in the Cabinet of Zambia by President Edgar Chagwa Lungu on 15 September 2016.

== Career ==
In the past, she served as the president of the Federation of Free Trade Unions of Zambia (FFTUZ). Immediately before her cabinet appointment, she served as the chairperson for Labour and Social Security in the Patriotic Front political party.

== Politics ==
In September 2016, she was appointed minister of Labour and Social Security in the Cabinet of Zambia and nominated as Member of Parliament of Zambia. She took the oath of office on 15 September 2015. She came under pressure to resign in December 2016 after she called for the arrest of a whistle blower Mika Mwambazi who had begun a complaint about alleged mistreatment of workers at Horseshoe, a failing steakhouse in Lusaka. The Human Rights Commission however presented a report that stated that the complaints of worker mistreatment and racism were indeed founded.
