= Kasumbalesa, Zambia =

Zambian settlement

Kasumbalesa
- Location in Zambia; Placement on map is approximate
- Coordinates: 12°16′05″S 27°47′40″E
- Country: Zambia
- Province: Copperbelt
- District: Chililabombwe District
- Elevation: 4,568 ft (1,392 m)

Kasumbalesa is a town in Zambia that sits across the international border from the much larger town of Kasumbalesa, Democratic Republic of the Congo. It is a major crossing point for human traffic and cargo between the two countries.

== Location ==
Kasumbalesa is located in Chililabombwe District, Copperbelt Province, approximately 17 kilometres (11 mi) north of the town of Chililabombwe, where the district headquarters are located, and just north-east of Konkola. Kasumbalesa is about 153.5 kilometres (95 mi), by road, northwest of Ndola, the largest city and capital of the Copperbelt Province. The geographical coordinates of Kasumbalesa, Zambia are 12°16'05.0"S, 27°47'40.0"E (Latitude:-12.268056; Longitude:27.794444). The average elevation of Kasumbalesa is 4,568 feet (1,392 m), above sea level.

== Overview ==
Kasumbalesa is a busy road-crossing point between Zambia and the Democratic Republic of the Congo, clearing in excess of 500 long-haul trucks daily in each direction. The infrastructure on the Zambian side of the border has been lacking, as of May 2019. Of particular concern, is the lack of public toilet facilities, posing a health risk.

Plans are underway to improve infrastructure including the construction of a larger parking yard for long-distance trucks, the construction of hotels and restaurants and the provision of public toilets, through public-private-partnership arrangements.

== See also ==
- Southern African Development Community
