= Francis Kapyanga =

Zambian politician (born 1987)

Honorable Francis Kapyanga

Member of National Assembly
- In office August 2021 – May 2026
- Constituency: Mpika

Member of National Assembly
- Incumbent
- Assumed office August 2026
- Constituency: Mpika North

Personal details
- Born: Francis Robert Kapyanga; 19 September 1987 (age 39) Zambia
- Party: Patriotic Front

Francis Robert Kapyanga (born 19 September 1987) is a Zambian politician who is the current Member of Parliament for Mpika North, having been elected in August 2026. Previously, he was the member of parliament for Mpika from August 2021 to May 2026.

== Parliamentary career ==
Kapyanga stood as the Patriotic Front candidate in Mpika at the 2021 general election and he was elected.

He caused a stir in parliament in 2022 after saying there were muscular men in his consistency to help those using bananas. This was after a pornographic video of the Drug Enforcement Commission was leaked. In 2023, a parliamentary video went viral after he went to parliament with a plastic portion of cooking oil to display the high cost of living of Zambians in the tenure of the United Party For National Development government. A year earlier, he mentioned that youths on the mining Copperbelt had planned protests against high costs of living.

Ahead of the 2026 general election, Mpika constituency was split into Mpika North and Mpika South. Kapyanga decided to stand for member of parliament in Mpika North. He was adopted as the National Reconciliation Party for Unity and Prosperity candidate in Mpika North and he was elected.
