= Zambia Congress of Trade Unions =

ZCTU
- Zambia Congress of Trade Unions
- Founded: 1966
- Headquarters: Lusaka, Zambia
- Location: Zambia
- Key people: Blake Mulala, president Joy Beene, Secretary General
- Affiliations: ITUC
- Website: zctu.org

Zambia Congress of Trade Unions (ZCTU) is the dominant central trade union federation in Zambia.

ZCTU was founded in 1964. The ZCTU was created by the government to replace the former United Trade Union Congress. It has 33 affiliated unions. Its vision is founded on the firm belief that trade union are indispensable partners in the industrial relations involving government, employers and labor and that the process of development culminates into equitable distribution of wealth among stakeholders.

Frederick Chiluba was Chairman-General of ZCTU 1974–1991. While serving as Zambian President, Chiluba appointed Newstead Zimba as Information and Broadcasting Services Minister.

From 1991 to 2002, the president was Fackson Shamenda. From October 2002 to 20 December 2014, the president was Leonard Choongo Hikaumba. The Secretary General was Sylvester Tembo from 2002 to 2008, and from 2008 to 20 December 2014, the Secretary General was Roy Mwaba. From 2015, Nkole Chishimba was elected and took over as president while running with the Secretary General in the name of Cosmas Mukuka. From 2022 to current, Blake Mulala holds the position of ZCTU President while Joy Beene is the Secretary General.

The Zambia Congress of Trade Union now has 65 affiliated unions, making it the largest federation of trade unions in Zambia.

The ZCTU is affiliated to the International Trade Union Confederation.
