= Ministry of Labour and Social Security (Zambia) =

Government ministry of Zambia

Coordinates: 15.4225°S 28.2902°E

- Coat of arms of Zambia

Ministry overview
- Type: Ministry
- Jurisdiction: Government of Zambia
- Headquarters: New Government Complex, Independence Avenue, P.O. Box 32186, Lusaka, Zambia
- Annual budget: ZMW. 48 million (2015)
- Ministry executive: Minister of Labour and Social Security
- Website: Homepage

The Ministry of Labour and Social Security (MLSS) is a Cabinet-level government ministry of Zambia. It is mandated to lead in the formulation and implementation of national employment, labour, and social security policy. The ministry is also responsible in monitoring national productivity, occupational safety and health, and relations between employees and their employers. The ministry is headed by Minister of Labour and Social Security.

== Location ==
The headquarters of the MLSS are located in the New Government Complex in the Cathedral Hill neighborhood of the city of Lusaka, the capital of Zambia. The coordinates of the headquarters of the MCTI are 15°25'21.0"S, 28°17'25.0"E (Latitude:-15.422499; Longitude:28.290270).

== Departments ==
MLSS is divided into the following administrative departments:

- Social Security Department
- Labour Department
- Planning Department
- Occupational Safety and Health Department
- Human Resources Department
- National Productivity and Development Unit

== Social security project ==
Since 2007, the government has had a national security scheme for seniors aged 60 years and older. As of 2012, approximately 4,000 individuals were beneficiaries of monthly payments. The scheme is under expansion to cover more seniors.

== List of ministers ==
Minister	Party	Term start	Term end
Minister of Labour and Social Services
Fwanyanga Mulikita	United National Independence Party	1970	1971
Minister of Labour and Social Security
Austin Liato	Movement for Multi-Party Democracy	2008	2011
Fackson Shamenda	Patriotic Front	2011	2015
Joyce Nonde-Simukoko	Patriotic Front	2016	2021
Brenda Tambatamba	United Party for National Development	2021	2026

=== Deputy ministers ===
Deputy Minister	Party	Term start	Term end
Austin Liato	Movement for Multi-Party Democracy	2006	2008
