= Kalombo Mwansa =

Zambian politician (1955–2020)

- Born: September 9, 1955
- Died: March 15, 2020
- Education: University of Zambia (BA); Harvard Law School (LLM); University of Cambridge (MA); University of London (PhD)

Kalombo Mwansa (September 9, 1955 – March 15, 2020) was a Zambian politician who served as Defence Minister.

== Political career ==
Kalombo Mwansa became Zambia's Defense Minister on July 9, 2009. He was previously the foreign minister of Zambia from July 19, 2002, until January 2005, when he switched positions with Ronnie Shikapwasha in a cabinet reshuffle and became home affairs minister until August 2005, when he became mines and development minister in another cabinet reshuffle. He became home minister again after the 2008 presidential election, serving from November 18, 2008, until July 2009 when he became Defense Minister in another cabinet reshuffle.

Mwansa died on March 15, 2020, at the age of 65.
