= Kabwata =

Suburb of Lusaka, Zambia

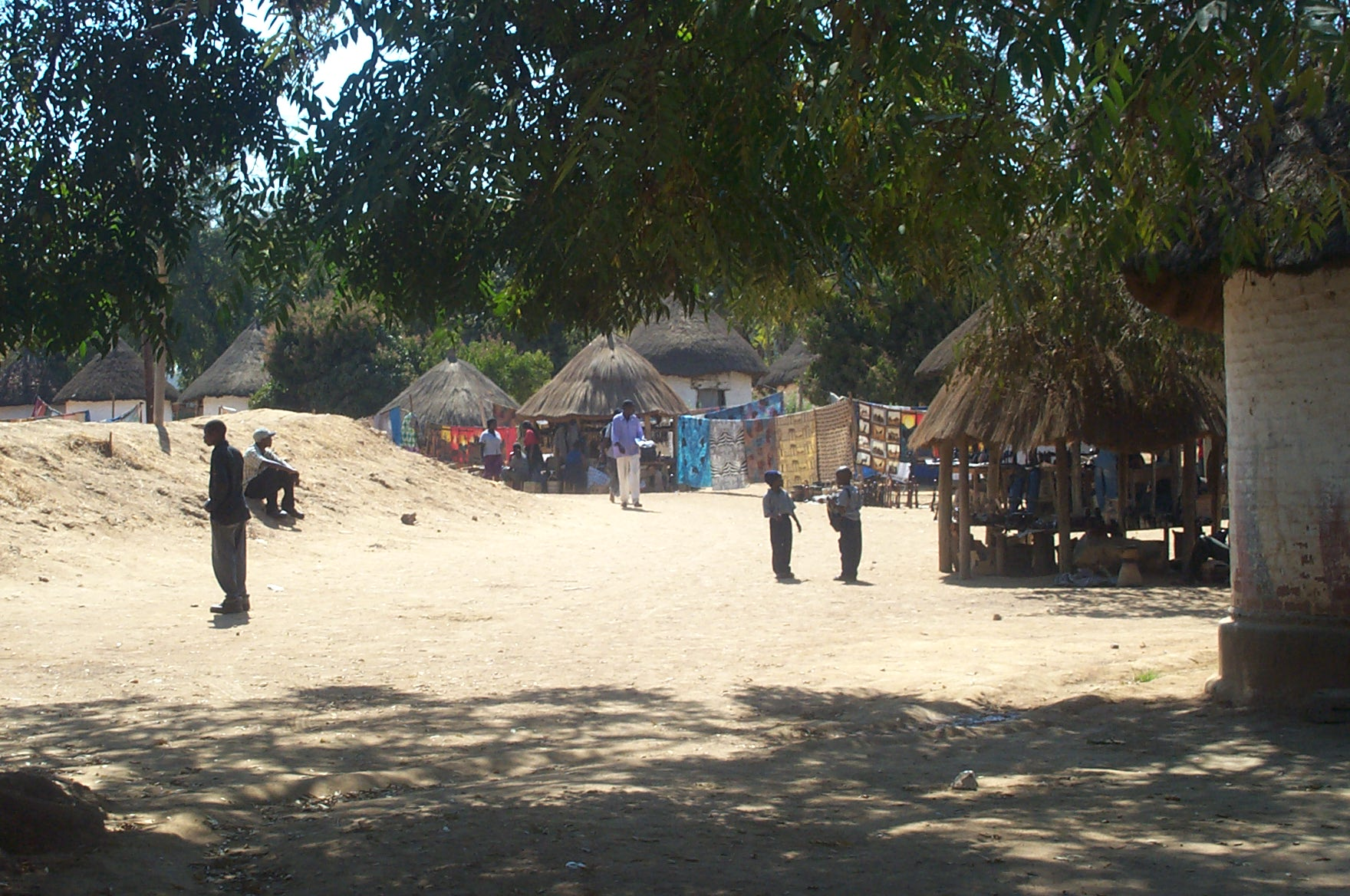
Kabwata Cultural Village

Kabwata is a township residential area located in Lusaka city, Lusaka Province, Zambia. It consists of Kabwata Estates and New Kabwata. Kabwata Estates on the north of Chilimbulu road, is composed of modern housing strcutures and a modern shopping mall but also has an area of pre-British Colonial preserved housing structures known as the Kabwata Cultural Village, while the rest is modern structures with the famous Kabwata flats, which are colorful high-rise flats. New Kabwata, to the south of Chilimbulu road, are modern council houses surround by citizen built housing structures known as Kabwata Site and Service.

Apart from the Kabwata Cultural village, Kabwata also hosts Kabwata Clinic, Kabwata Market, Kabwata Primary School and St. Patrick's Girls Primary School.
