= Benjamin Mwila =

Zambian politician

Benjamin Yoram Mwila (September 17, 1943 – August 17, 2013), often known as BY, was a Zambian politician and businessman. Mwila was a prominent leader and co-founder of the Zambia Republican Party. He served as an MP for Luanshya in the National Assembly. Mwila held several cabinet portfolios within the cabinet of President Frederick Chiluba during the 1990s, including Minister of Defence from 1991 to 1997.

== Life and career ==
Mwila was born in Kawambwa, Zambia, on September 17, 1943. He attended primary school in Kawambwa and Chiwala Secondary School in Ndola. He then transferred to Munali Secondary School.

Mwila was originally a member of the Movement for Movement for Multi-Party Democracy (MMD), whose other members included Frederick Chiluba. Chiluba was elected President of Zambia in 1991. Mwila was also elected to the National Assembly as an MP from the Luanshya constituency in the 1991 general election. President Chiluba appointed Benjamin Mwila as a member of his cabinet. He served as Minister of Defence from 1991 to 1997, and he also served for a time as Minister of Energy and Water Development.

Mwila left the MMD in 2000 after being criticized by fellow party members for considering a presidential candidacy. He founded the Zambia Republican Party. Mwila ran for President of Zambia in the 2001 presidential election as leader of the Zambia Republican Party. Levy Mwanawasa of the MMD won the 2001 election, while Mwila garnered approximately 4.84% of the vote.

In 2006, Mwila's Zambia Republican Party merged with several other political parties to form the National Democratic Focus (NDF). That same year, Mwila was elected to the National Assembly from the Nchelenge constituency under the NDF ticket. In 2011, Mwila left the NDF and rejoined the MMD. He ran for his re-election to his parliamentary seat from Nchelenge, but was defeated in the 2011 general election.

Mwila died at a hospital in South Africa on August 17, 2013, at the age of 70. He had been hospitalized for treatment of malaria for two weeks. His funeral was held at the Cathedral of the Holy Cross in Lusaka with the burial at the city's Memorial Park Cemetery.
