= Zambia Republican Party =

Political party in Zambia

The Zambia Republican Party (ZRP) is a political party in Zambia.

== History ==
The ZRP was formed in February 2001 as a merger of the Zambia Alliance for Progress (ZAP), the Republican Party and the National Republican Party; however, the ZAP later withdrew from the merger. In the December 2001 general elections it nominated Benjamin Mwila as its presidential candidate; Mwila finished sixth in a field of eleven candidates with 5% of the vote. In the National Assembly elections the party received 6% of the vote, winning a single seat.

In June 2006 a faction of the party left to join the Movement for Multi-Party Democracy. In the build-up to the September 2006 general elections the ZRP joined the National Democratic Focus alliance. The NDF did not nominate a presidential candidate, but won a single seat in the National Assembly elections, taken by Mwila. Prior to the 2011 general elections Mwila left to join the MMD.
