= National Citizens' Coalition =

The National Citizens' Coalition (NCC) was a minor political party in Zambia.

== History ==
The NCC was founded by Nevers Mumba, an evangelical pastor, in 1997, and was known as the National Christian Coalition until being renamed on 19 June 1998. In the 2001 general elections, Mumba was the party's presidential candidate, receiving 2.2% of the vote, finishing eighth in a field of 11 candidates. In the National Assembly elections the party received 2% of the vote, failing to win a seat.

The party was dissolved on 27 May 2003 to merge into the Movement for Multi-Party Democracy, after which Mumba was appointed Vice President.
