= Alexander Grey Zulu =

Zambian politician (1924–2020)

Alexander Grey Zulu (3 September 1924 – 16 August 2020) was a Zambian politician.

Zulu was born in Chipata. He was subsequently educated at Munali Secondary School in Lusaka.

After serving in several positions, Zulu was appointed Minister of Commerce and Industry 1964; Minister of Transport and Works 1964; Minister of Mines and Cooperatives 1965–67; Minister of Home Affairs 1967–70; Minister of Defence 1970–73; Secretary General of the Party (equivalent to vice president) 1973–78; Secretary of State for Defence and Security 1979–85; Secretary General 1986–1991.

He had four sons and four daughters.
