= Chililabombwe District =

Coordinates: 12°20′S 27°50′E

- District
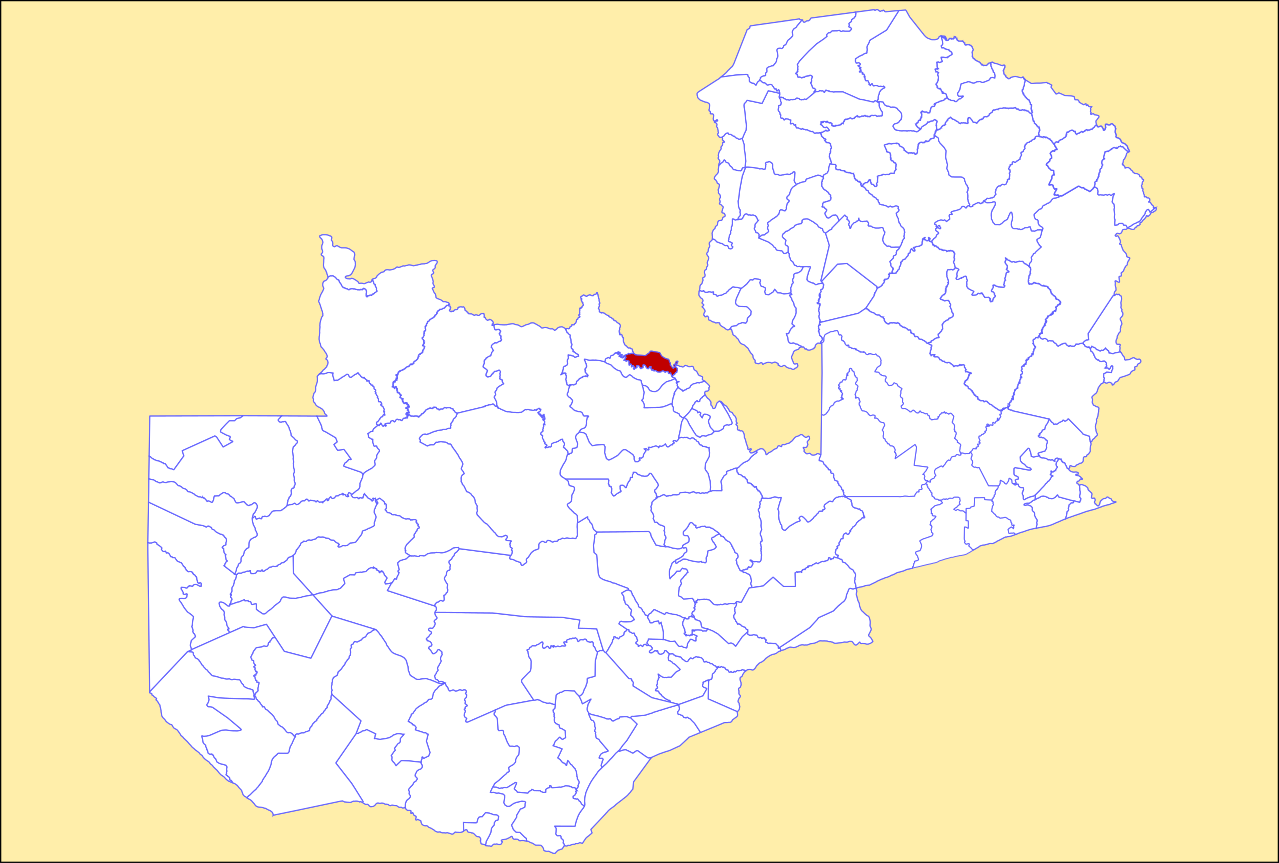
- District location in Zambia
- Country: Zambia
- Province: Copperbelt Province
- Capital: Chililabombwe

Area
  - Total: 1,026.2 km^{2} (396.2 sq mi)

Population (2022)
  - Total: 141,899
  - Density: 138.28/km^{2} (358.13/sq mi)
- Time zone: UTC+2 (CAT)

Chililabombwe District is a district of Zambia, located in Copperbelt Province. The capital is Chililabombwe. At the 2022 Zambian Census, the district had a population of 141,899.
