= 1964 Northern Rhodesian general election =

← 1962	20 and 21 January 1964	1968 →

All 75 seats in the Legislative Council
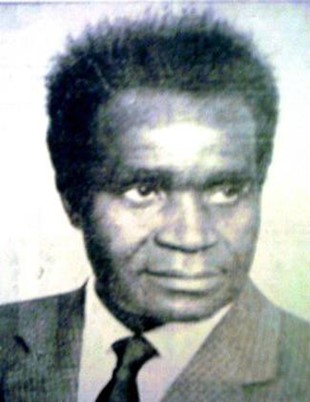

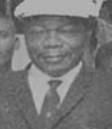

	First party	Second party	Third party
Leader	Kenneth Kaunda	Harry Nkumbula	John Roberts
Party	UNIP	NRANC	NPP
Leader's seat	Mkushi	Monze	Central
Last election	78.16%, 14 seats	21.32%, 7 seats	–
Seats won	55 (Main roll)	10 (Main roll)	10 (Reserved roll)
Seat change	▲41	▲3	New
Popular vote	570,612	251,963	11,157
Percentage	69.06%	30.50%	63.63%
Prime Minister before election
None
Prime Minister-designate
Kenneth Kaunda
UNIP

General elections were held in Northern Rhodesia on 20 and 21 January 1964. There were two voter rolls for the Legislative Council, a main roll that elected 65 seats, and a reserved roll that elected 10. Africans elected the main roll, whilst Europeans elected the reserve roll. Other ethnicities were allowed to choose which roll to be part of. The United National Independence Party won the elections, taking 55 of the common roll seats. Its leader, Kenneth Kaunda became Prime Minister, leading the country to independence in October that year, at which point he became President. Voter turnout was 94.8% for the main roll and 74.1% for the reserved roll.

== Background ==
The Northern Rhodesian African National Congress (NRANC) sought to delay the elections, claiming that twelve of its candidates had been prevented from registering, and its request for the nomination process to be extended was granted. NRANC leader Harry Nkumbula claimed that failure to postpone the elections would lead to "passive resistance" and that any violence would be "the entire responsibility of the Governor and his officers." The election date was also criticised by the People's Democratic Congress, which claimed that good weather during the month would encourage people to do farmwork rather than go out to vote. It also criticised the registration process, claiming that some people had to walk over 30 miles in order to register to vote.

== Campaign ==
UNIP contested all 10 reserved roll seats, putting up candidates including former Liberal Party leader John Moffat and ex-minister Charles Cousins.

UNIP won 24 of the 75 common roll seats unopposed, whilst the NRANC also had five members returned unopposed, although all of them defected to UNIP.

== Conduct ==
Seven people were killed in the Chinsali area by members of the Lumpa Church sect, who were trying to prevent people from joining political parties. Following reports of violence, Kaunda flew to the area to attempt to broker a truce.

The election campaign also saw clashes between NRANC and UNIP supporters, with two UNIP members killed. Fighting between the two in Mufulira in mid-January had to be broken up with tear gas, whilst two children were killed near Fort Jameson when a house inhabited by NRANC supporters was burned down.

== Results ==
Party	Main roll			Reserved roll			Total seats	+/–
Party	Votes	%	Seats	Votes	%	Seats	Total seats	+/–
United National Independence Party	570,612	69.06	55	6,177	35.23	0	55	+41
Northern Rhodesian African National Congress	251,963	30.50	10	165	0.94	0	10	+3
National Progressive Party				11,157	63.63	10	10	New
Independents	3,662	0.44	0	35	0.20	0	0	0
Total	826,237	100.00	65	17,534	100.00	10	75	+30
Valid votes	826,237	99.50		17,534	98.74			
Invalid/blank votes	4,178	0.50		224	1.26			
Total votes	830,415	100.00		17,758	100.00			
Registered voters/turnout	876,212	94.77		23,981	74.05			
Source: Nohlen et al.

== Aftermath ==
A new UNIP-led government was sworn in shortly before the end of January. Governor Evelyn Dennison Hone retained responsibility for foreign affairs, defence and policing.

Position	Minister
Prime Minister	Kenneth Kaunda
Minister of Agriculture	Elijah Mudenda
Minister of Commerce and Industry	Alexander Grey Zulu
Minister of Education	John Mwanakatwe
Minister of Finance	Arthur Wina
Minister of Health	Sikota Wina
Minister of Home Affairs	Simon Kapwepwe
Minister of Housing and Social Development	Dingiswayo Banda
Minister of Justice	Mainza Chona
Minister of Labour and Mines	Justin Chimba
Minister of Land and Works	Solomon Kalulu
Minister of Local Government	Nalumino Mundia
Minister of Natural Resources	Munukayumbwa Sipalo
Minister of Transport and Communications	Reuben Kamanga

== See also ==
- List of members of the National Assembly of Zambia (1964–68)
