= 2001 Zambian general election =

- 27 December 2001
- Presidential election
- Registered: 2,604,761
- Turnout: 66.72% (▲11.20 pp)
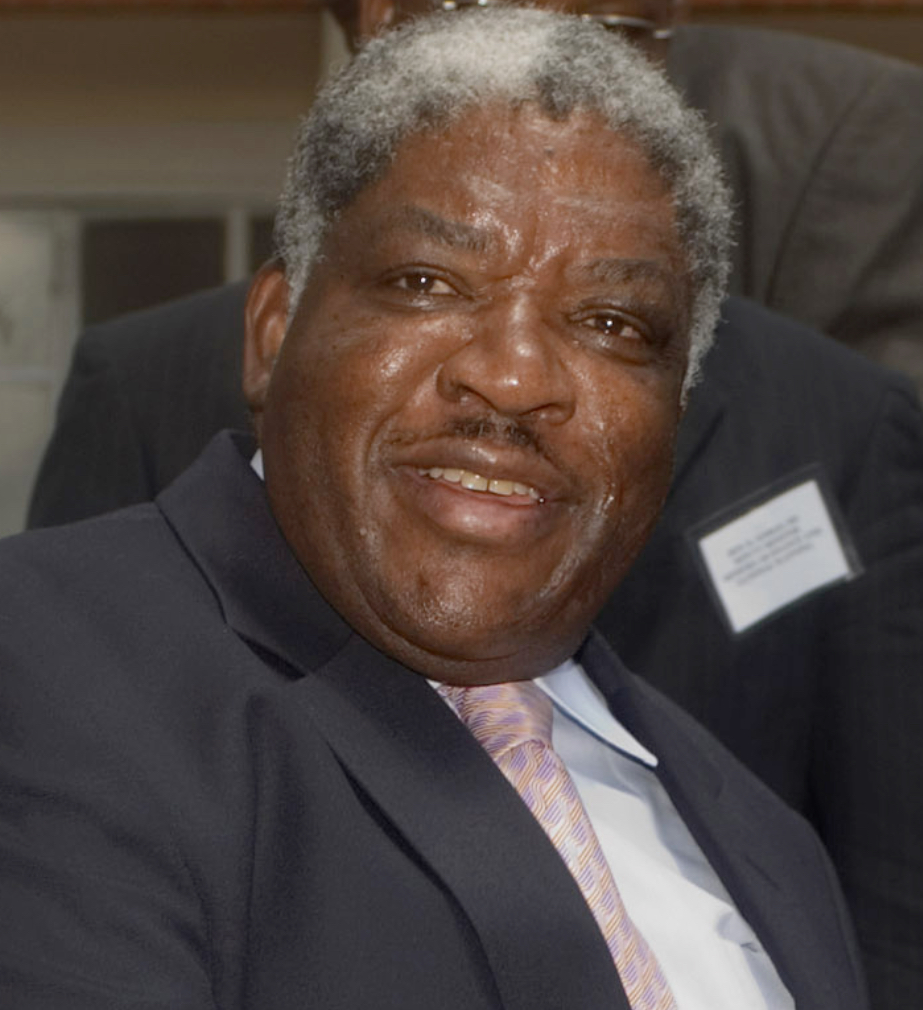

| Nominee | Levy Mwanawasa | Anderson Mazoka | Christon Tembo |
| Party | MMD | UPND | FDD |
| Popular vote | 506,695 | 472,697 | 228,861 |
| Percentage | 29.15% | 27.20% | 13.17% |
| Nominee | Tilyenji Kaunda | Godfrey Miyanda |
| Party | UNIP | Heritage |
| Popular vote | 175,898 | 140,688 |
| Percentage | 10.12% | 8.09% |
President before election
Frederick Chiluba
MMD
Elected President
Levy Mwanawasa
MMD

General elections were held in Zambia on 27 December 2001 to elect a President and National Assembly. The result was a victory for the ruling Movement for Multi-Party Democracy, which won 69 of the 150 National Assembly seats and whose candidate, Levy Mwanawasa, won the presidential vote.

The results of the elections were disputed by main opposition parties, including the United Party for National Development, which some observers claimed had won the elections. Some domestic and international election monitors cited serious irregularities with the campaign and election, including vote rigging, flawed voter registration, unequal and biased media coverage, and the MMD's improper use of state resources. In January 2002, three opposition candidates petitioned the Supreme Court to overturn Mwanawasa's victory. While the court agreed that the poll was flawed, it ruled in February 2005 that the irregularities did not affect the results and declined the petition.

== Results ==
=== President ===
| Candidate | Party | Votes | % |
|---|---|---|---|
| Levy Mwanawasa | Movement for Multiparty Democracy | 506,695 | 29.15 |
| Anderson Mazoka | United Party for National Development | 472,697 | 27.20 |
| Christon Tembo | Forum for Democracy and Development | 228,861 | 13.17 |
| Tilyenji Kaunda | United National Independence Party | 175,898 | 10.12 |
| Godfrey Miyanda | Heritage Party | 140,688 | 8.10 |
| Benjamin Mwila | Zambia Republican Party | 85,473 | 4.92 |
| Michael Sata | Patriotic Front | 59,172 | 3.40 |
| Nevers Mumba | National Citizens' Coalition | 38,860 | 2.24 |
| Gwendoline Konie | Social Democratic Party | 10,253 | 0.59 |
| Inonge Mbikusita-Lewanika | Agenda for Zambia | 9,882 | 0.57 |
| Yobert K. Shamapande | National Leadership for Development | 9,481 | 0.55 |
| Total | | 1,737,960 | 100.00 |
| Valid votes | | 1,737,960 | 98.12 |
| Invalid/blank votes | | 33,375 | 1.88 |
| Total votes | | 1,771,335 | 100.00 |
| Registered voters/turnout | | 2,604,761 | 68.00 |
Source: Electoral Commission

=== National Assembly ===
| Party | Votes | % | Seats | +/– |
|---|---|---|---|---|
| Movement for Multi-Party Democracy | 490,684 | 28.00 | 69 | –62 |
| United Party for National Development | 416,239 | 23.75 | 49 | New |
| Forum for Democracy and Development | 272,817 | 15.57 | 12 | New |
| United National Independence Party | 185,536 | 10.59 | 13 | +13 |
| Heritage Party | 132,397 | 7.55 | 4 | New |
| Zambia Republican Party | 97,063 | 5.54 | 1 | New |
| Patriotic Front | 49,362 | 2.82 | 1 | New |
| National Citizens' Coalition | 35,947 | 2.05 | 0 | New |
| Zambia Alliance for Progress | 3,963 | 0.23 | 0 | –2 |
| National Leadership for Development | 3,155 | 0.18 | 0 | New |
| Agenda for Zambia | 2,832 | 0.16 | 0 | –2 |
| National Party | 1,228 | 0.07 | 0 | –5 |
| Social Democratic Party | 809 | 0.05 | 0 | New |
| Liberal Progressive Front | 175 | 0.01 | 0 | 0 |
| Zambia United Development Party | 138 | 0.01 | 0 | New |
| Democratic Party | 115 | 0.01 | 0 | New |
| Zambia Progressive Party | 19 | 0.00 | 0 | New |
| Independents | 60,045 | 3.43 | 1 | –9 |
| Presidential appointees | | | 8 | 0 |
| Appointed speaker | | | 1 | 0 |
| Total | 1,752,524 | 100.00 | 159 | 0 |
| Valid votes | 1,752,524 | 97.84 | | |
| Invalid/blank votes | 38,675 | 2.16 | | |
| Total votes | 1,791,199 | 100.00 | | |
| Registered voters/turnout | 2,604,761 | 68.77 | | |
Source: Electoral Commission

== See also ==
- List of members of the National Assembly of Zambia (2002–06)
