= List of members of the National Assembly of Zambia (1969–1973) =

The members of the National Assembly of Zambia from 1969 until 1973 were elected on 19 December 1968. Of the 105 elected members, 81 were from the United National Independence Party and 23 from the Zambian African National Congress, together with a single independent. Five additional members were nominated.

== List of members ==
=== Elected members ===
Constituency	Member	Party
Balovale East	William Nkanza	United National Independence Party
Balovale West	Samuel Mbilishi	United National Independence Party
Bangweulu North	Scott Matafwali	United National Independence Party
Chadiza	Zongani Banda	United National Independence Party
Chama	Nephas Tembo	United National Independence Party
Chikankata	Isiah Nakalonga	Zambian African National Congress
Chililabombwe	Nephas Mulenga	United National Independence Party
Chingola East	Fines Bulawayo	United National Independence Party
Chingola West	Aaron Milner	United National Independence Party
Chinsali North	Robert Makasa	United National Independence Party
Chinsali South	Patrick Muwowo	United National Independence Party
Chipata East	Humphrey Mulemba	United National Independence Party
Chipata North	Shadreck Soko	United National Independence Party
Chipata West	John Ngoma	United National Independence Party
Chitambo	Pirie Kapika	United National Independence Party
Choma	Peter Muunga	Zambian African National Congress
Gwembe North	Hugh Mitchley	Independent
Gwembe South	Godson Kanyama	Zambian African National Congress
Isoka East	Pius Kasutu	United National Independence Party
Isoka West	Wittington Siaklumbi	United National Independence Party
Kabompo	Victor Kanyungulu	United National Independence Party
Kabwe	Josy Monga	United National Independence Party
Kabwe South	Scent Loloma	United National Independence Party
Kabwe West	Aaron Chikatula	Zambian African National Congress
Kalabo	Mbambo Sianga	Zambian African National Congress
Kalomo	Robinson Muwezwa	Zambian African National Congress
Kalulushi	Frank Chitambala	United National Independence Party
Kantanshi	Wilson Chakulya	United National Independence Party
Kasama North	James Sinyangwe	United National Independence Party
Kasama South	Alex Shapi	United National Independence Party
Kasama West	Alexander Grey Zulu	United National Independence Party
Kasempa	Matiya Ngalande	United National Independence Party
Katete North	Charles Thornicroft	United National Independence Party
Katete South	Amock Phiri	United National Independence Party
Kawambwa	John Mwanakatwe	United National Independence Party
Kawambwa East	Gibson Chimfwembe	United National Independence Party
Kitwe East	Moto Nkama	United National Independence Party
Kitwe North	Wesley Nyirenda	United National Independence Party
Kitwe West	Timothy Kankasa	United National Independence Party
Libonda	Nalumino Mundia	Zambian African National Congress
Livingstone	Jethro Mutti	United National Independence Party
Luampa	Fine Liboma	United National Independence Party
Luanshya	Andrew Mutemba	United National Independence Party
Luapula	Sylvester Chisembele	United National Independence Party
Lukanga	Henry Shamabanse	United National Independence Party
Lukona	Maboshe Silumesii	Zambian African National Congress
Lukulu	Sylvester Katota	United National Independence Party
Lundazi Central	Haswell Mwale	United National Independence Party
Lundazi East	Jonathan Chivunga	United National Independence Party
Lundazi South	Axon Soko	United National Independence Party
Lusaka City Central	Dingiswayo Banda	United National Independence Party
Lusaka City East	Solomon Kalulu	United National Independence Party
Lusaka City West	Elijah Mudenda	United National Independence Party
Lusaka Rural East	Isaac Mumpansha	United National Independence Party
Lusaka Rural North	Mathew Nkoloma	United National Independence Party
Lusaka Rural West	Kennan Nkwabilo	United National Independence Party
Luwingu East	Henry Mapulanga	United National Independence Party
Luwingu West	Unia Mwila	United National Independence Party
Malambo	Raphael Sakala	United National Independence Party
Mankoya	Mainza Chona	United National Independence Party
Mansa	Lewis Changufu	United National Independence Party
Mazabuka	Herbert Mwinga	Zambian African National Congress
Mbabala	Edward Nyanga	Zambian African National Congress
Mbala North	Monica Nanyangwe	United National Independence Party
Mbala South	Steven Sikombe	United National Independence Party
Mkushi North	Musonda Chambeshi	United National Independence Party
Mkushi South	Richard Mboroma	United National Independence Party
Mongu	Mufaya Mumbuna	Zambian African National Congress
Monze Central	Bennie Hamwemba	Zambian African National Congress
Monze East	Hamwende Kayumba	Zambian African National Congress
Monze West	Harry Nkumbula	Zambian African National Congress
Mpika East	Victor Ng'andu	United National Independence Party
Mpika West	Otto Vibetti	United National Independence Party
Mporokoso North	Benson Mumba	United National Independence Party
Mporokoso South	Mulenga Chapoloko	United National Independence Party
Mpulungu	Isaac Masaiti	United National Independence Party
Mufulira East	Joseph Mutale	United National Independence Party
Mufulira West	John Chisata	United National Independence Party
Mumbwa East	Allan Chilimboyi	Zambian African National Congress
Mumbwa West	Enock Shooba	Zambian African National Congress
Mununshi	Jonas Mambwe	United National Independence Party
Mweru	Thomas Chilengwe	United National Independence Party
Mwense	Mathew Lumande	United National Independence Party
Mwinilunga	Peter Matoka	United National Independence Party
Nalikwanda	Morgan Simwinji	Zambian African National Congress
Namwala	Edward Liso	Zambian African National Congress
Ndola Central	Misheck Banda	United National Independence Party
Ndola North	Reuben Kamanga	United National Independence Party
Ndola Rural East	Joseph Litana	United National Independence Party
Ndola Rural West	Baupis Kapulu	United National Independence Party
Ndola South	Peter Chanda	United National Independence Party
Pemba	Chiinda Hamusankwa	Zambian African National Congress
Petauke Central	Justin Chimba	United National Independence Party
Petauke South	Josiah Kanyuka	United National Independence Party
Petauke West	Sylvester Tembo	United National Independence Party
Roan	Sikota Wina	United National Independence Party
Samfya	Stalin Kaushi	United National Independence Party
Samfya East	Clement Mwananshiku	United National Independence Party
Senanga East	Hastings Noyoo	Zambian African National Congress
Senanga West	Maxwell Mututwa	Zambian African National Congress
Serenje	Kamfwa Jonasi	United National Independence Party
Sesheke	Sefulo Kakoma	Zambian African National Congress
Solwezi	Gilbert Wisamba	United National Independence Party
Wusikili/Chamboli	Simon Kapwepwe	United National Independence Party
Zimba	Matron Sialumba	Zambian African National Congress

==== Replacements by by-election ====
Constituency	Original member	Party	By-election date	New member	Party
Kalulushi	Frank Chitambala	United National Independence Party	1970	Alexander Chikwanda	United National Independence Party
Mpulungu	Isaac Masaiti	United National Independence Party	1970	Israel Kasomo	United National Independence Party
Lusaka Rural East	Isaac Mumpansha	United National Independence Party	1970	Felix Luputa	United National Independence Party
Lukona	Maboshe Silumesii	Zambian African National Congress	December 1971	Maboshe Silumesii	United National Independence Party
Mkushi North	Musonda Chambeshi	United National Independence Party	December 1971	Rajah Kunda	United National Independence Party
Monze East	Hamwende Kayumba	Zambian African National Congress	December 1971	Isaac Mumpansha	Zambian African National Congress
Mpika East	Victor Ng'andu	United National Independence Party	December 1971	Phillip Mwango	United National Independence Party
Mporokoso South	Mulenga Chapoloko	United National Independence Party	December 1971	Wila Mung'omba	United National Independence Party
Mufulira West	John Chisata	United National Independence Party	December 1971	Simon Kapwepwe	United Progressive Party
Petauke Central	Justin Chimba	United National Independence Party	December 1971	Fanwell Chiwawa	United National Independence Party
Nalikwanda	Morgan Simwinji	Zambian African National Congress	December 1971	Nawa Ikacana	United National Independence Party
Namwala	Edward Liso	Zambian African National Congress	December 1971	Wilfred Shoonji	Zambian African National Congress
Pemba	Chiinda Hamusankwa	Zambian African National Congress	December 1971	Richard Farmer	Zambian African National Congress
Senanga West	Maxwell Mututwa	Zambian African National Congress	December 1971	Anamela Matakala	Zambian African National Congress
Wusikili/Chamboli	Simon Kapwepwe	United National Independence Party	December 1971	Steven Malama	United National Independence Party

=== Non-elected members ===
Type	Member	Party
Speaker	Robinson Nabulyato	Independent
Nominated	Fitzpatrick Chuula	
Nominated	Fwanyanga Mulikita	
Nominated	Valentine Musakanya	
Nominated	Madeline Robertson	
Nominated	Josaphat Siyomunji	

==== Replacements ====
Original member	Date	Replacement	Notes
Josaphat Siyomunji	1970	Andreya Masiye	Nominated
Valentine Musakanya	1970	Ali Simbule	Nominated
Andreya Masiye	1971	Josaphat Siyomunji	Nominated
