= List of members of the Legislative Council of Northern Rhodesia (1962–1964) =

Members of the Legislative Council of Northern Rhodesia from 1962 until 1964 were elected on 30 October 1962. However, not all the national seats were filled; although by-elections were held on 10 December, several seats still remained empty.

== List of members ==
=== Upper Roll seats ===
Constituency	Member	Party	Notes
Broken Hill	John Roberts	United Federal Party	
Chingola	Samuel Magnus	United Federal Party	
Eastern Rural	Ebden Carlisle	United Federal Party	
Kitwe East	Hugh Stanley	United Federal Party	
Kitwe West	Jerry Steyn	United Federal Party	
Livingstone	James MacMillan	United Federal Party	
Luanshya–Kansenji	Cecil Dennistoun Burney	United Federal Party	
Lusaka East	Gabriel Musumbulwa	United Federal Party	
Lusaka West	Hugh Mitchley	United Federal Party	
Mufulira	Pieter Wulff	United Federal Party	
Ndola East	Thomas Lawler	United Federal Party	
Northern Rural	John Mwanakatwe	United National Independence Party	Parliamentary Secretary for Labour and Mines
Roan	Hendrick Liebenberg	United Federal Party	
Southern Rural	John Burnside	United Federal Party	
Western Rural	Norman Coates	United Federal Party	

=== Lower Roll seats ===
Constituency	Member	Party	Notes
Bangweulu	Kenneth Kaunda	United National Independence Party	Minister of Local Government and Social Welfare
Barotseland East	Arthur Wina	United National Independence Party	Parliamentary Secretary for Finance
Barotseland West	Mubiana Nalilungwe	United National Independence Party	
Copperbelt Central	Alexander Grey Zulu	United National Independence Party	Parliamentary Secretary for Native Affairs
Copperbelt East	John Chisata	United National Independence Party	
Copperbelt West	Sikota Wina	United National Independence Party	Parliamentary Secretary for Local Government and Social Welfare
Eastern	Wesley Nyirenda	United National Independence Party	
Lusaka Rural	Edward Liso	Northern Rhodesian African National Congress	Parliamentary Secretary to the Chief Secretary
Midlands	Elijah Mudenda	United National Independence Party	Parliamentary Secretary for African Agriculture
Muchinga	Aaron Milner	United National Independence Party	
Northern	Simon Kapwepwe	United National Independence Party	Minister of African Agriculture
North-Western	Samuel Mblishi	United National Independence Party	
South-Eastern	Reuben Kamanga	United National Independence Party	Minister of Labour and Mines
Southern	Chiwala Banda	Northern Rhodesian African National Congress	Parliamentary Secretary for African Education
South-Western	Harry Nkumbula	Northern Rhodesian African National Congress	Minister of African Education

=== National seats ===
Constituency	Member	Party	Notes
Lower Kafue (African)	Francis Chembe	Northern Rhodesian African National Congress	Parliamentary Secretary for Transport and Works (until 6 November 1963)
Lower Kafue (European)	Jack Eaton	United Federal Party	
Luangwa (African)	Philemon Zindana	United Federal Party	
Luangwa (European)	Charles Cousins	Northern Rhodesian African National Congress	Minister of Land and Natural Resources (until 30 November 1963)
Luapula (2 seats)	Francis Stubbs	Northern Rhodesian African National Congress	Minister of Transport and Works
Zambezi (2 seats)	Job Michello	Northern Rhodesian African National Congress	Parliamentary Secretary for Land and Natural Resources (until 13 August 1963)
Special National	Kashibhai Patel	Independent (UNIP)	

=== Nominated members ===
Position	Member	Notes
Speaker	Thomas Williams	
Nominated Official Member	Leonard Bean	Acting Administrative Secretary
Nominated Official Member	P.H. Counsell	Permanent Secretary to the Ministry of Legal Affairs and Solicitor-General
Nominated Unofficial Member	Gwendoline Konie	From 12 March 1963

==== Replacements ====
Previous member	Date	New member	Notes
Leonard Bean	12 March 1963	Albert Gaminara	Administrative Secretary
P.H. Counsell	18 June 1963	William McCall	Permanent Secretary to the Ministry of Legal Affairs and Solicitor-General
Albert Gaminara	5 November 1963	G.F. Tredwell	Permanent Secretary to the Ministry of the Chief Secretary

=== Ex officio members ===
Position	Member
Chief Secretary to the Government	Frederick Thomas, Richard Luyt
Attorney-General and Minister of Legal Affairs	William McCall, Brian Andre Doyle
Chief Commissioner and Minister of Native Affairs	E.C. Thomson, Leonard Bean, Frederick Thomas
Minister of Finance	A.E. Lewis, Trevor Gardner
