= 1962 Northern Rhodesian general election =

General elections were held in Northern Rhodesia on 30 October 1962, with by-elections for several seats held on 10 December. Although the United Federal Party won the most seats in the Legislative Council, and Northern Rhodesian African National Congress leader Harry Nkumbula had made a secret electoral pact with the UFP, Nkumbula decided to form a government with the United National Independence Party.

== Electoral system ==
The elections were carried out under the "15-15-15" system, with 15 seats elected by an upper roll, 15 seats by a lower roll and 15 seats by the national roll; the national roll seats consisted of four 'reserved' two-seat constituencies returning an African and a European member; three two-member 'open' constituencies that would return two members of any race, and one nationwide constituency for Asians. The initial plan for the reserved and open national roll seats was that candidates would have to receive at least 15% of the vote from both the upper and lower rolls to be elected. However, this was fiercely opposed by Prime Minister of the Federation of Rhodesia and Nyasaland Roy Welensky, as the lower roll was likely to be entirely black, giving his UFP little chance of winning seats. The system was later changed to require candidates to receive at least 10% of the vote from each race, and at least 20% of the vote from either the upper or lower roll.

To qualify for the upper roll, voters had to have an income of at least £720 or own at least £1,500 of immovable property. This was reduced to £480/£1,000 for those with a full primary education and £300/£1,000 for those with at least four years of secondary education. Several people were automatically allowed to register as upper roll voters, including chiefs, hereditary councillors, members of native authorities and courts, municipal councils, township housing boards and area housing boards, ministers of religion, members of certain religions with at least two years of secondary education, pensioners, university graduates, holders of an award from the Queen, those with a letter of exemption under the African Exemption Ordinance dated prior to 1 July 1961, or be the wife of a qualified upper roll voter (in polygamous marriages, only the senior wife qualified). Lower roll voters had to have an income of at least £120 or own immovable property worth at least £250. Certain other people were automatically entitled to be a lower roll voter, including tribal councillors, members of native authorities and courts, municipal councils, township housing boards and area housing boards, headmen, pensioners, members of certain religious bodies, holders of an award from the Queen, or people registered as Individual, Peasant or Improved Farmers for two years prior to their application. The wife (or senior wife) of anyone qualifying to be a lower roll voter also qualified.

The upper roll had a total of 37,142 voters, of which 27,893 were European, 7,321 were African and 1,928 were Asian. The lower roll had 91,941 voters, of which 91,913 were African and 28 Asian.

In order to vote, voters had to dip their thumbs in red ink, which would remain for two days. In Lusaka two European voters refused to dip their thumbs, and were barred from voting. One, Colin Cunningham, a former leader of the Rhodesian Republican Party, claimed it would be "trespass against his person."

== Campaign ==
UNIP originally planned to boycott the elections in protest at the failure to move to majority rule. However, the decision was later reversed after the outcome of the Delimitation Commission. UNIP leader Kenneth Kaunda spoke at over a hundred meetings during the campaign. In Sweden the Social Democratic Party and the Liberal Party started an appeal for £20,000 to contribute to UNIP's election campaign, calling federal UFP leader Roy Welensky "sabre-rattling" and a "leader of the white Fascists." The campaign raised only £3,700.

== Conduct ==
On 26 October NRANC official Danwell Kuseka was killed when he was ambushed after an election meeting near Kitwe; three others were injured, one with a broken back. Kaunda called for UNIP members to co-operate with the police in finding the attackers. African candidates for the UFP were reported to have experienced a "living hell of intimidation." Polling day took place largely without incident and saw a high turnout. In the Congolese city of Elisabethville a group of 100 Northern Rhodesians attended the British Consul to vote. However, after they discovered that only 17 of them had registered, they stormed the building and stoned the consul, resulting in him being hospitalised. Congolese police arrested 15 of the group.

== Results ==
On election day, 14 of the upper roll seats and all 15 lower roll seats were decided, but only five of the 15 national seats; the UFP won 15 seats, UNIP 14 and the NRANC five. By-elections were subsequently held on 10 December for the Livingstone upper roll seats, and for the ten remaining national seats, with the UFP winning in Livingstone, and the NRANC winning the only two national roll seats to have a winner, leaving the UFP with a final total of 16 seats and the NRANC with seven.

Party	Upper roll			Lower roll			Seats		
Party	Votes	%	Seats	Votes	%	Seats	National	Total	+/–
United National Independence Party	4,519	14.79	1	59,648	78.16	12	1	14	New
United Federal Party	21,558	70.54	13	180	0.24	0	2	15	+2
Northern Rhodesian African National Congress	1,025	3.35	0	16,268	21.32	3	4	7	+6
Liberal Party	1,401	4.58	0	83	0.11	0	0	0	–3
Rhodesia Republican Party	65	0.21	0				0	0	New
Barotse National Party				134	0.18	0	0	0	New
Independents	1,992	6.52	0				0	0	−2
Vacant			1				8	9	–
Total	30,560	100.00	15	76,313	100.00	15	15	45	+25
Valid votes	30,560	98.08		76,313	95.63				
Invalid/blank votes	598	1.92		3,488	4.37				
Total votes	31,158	100.00		79,801	100.00				
Registered voters/turnout	34,527	90.24		92,255	86.50				
Source: Mulford, pp189–190

=== By constituency ===
Constituency	Candidate	Party	Votes	%	Invalid/ blank	Total	Registered	Turnout
Upper roll
Broken Hill	John Roberts	United Federal Party	1,801		67	2,193	2,634	83.3
Broken Hill	Ibrahim Nkonde	United National Independence Party	290		67	2,193	2,634	83.3
Broken Hill	Alun Price	Liberal Party	35		67	2,193	2,634	83.3
Chingola	Samuel Magnus	United Federal Party	1,668		16	2,330	2,492	93.5
Chingola	C M Morris	Independent	646		16	2,330	2,492	93.5
Eastern Rural	Ebden Carlisle	United Federal Party	1,243		50	2,244	2,520	89.0
Eastern Rural	Harry Gardner	United National Independence Party	555		50	2,244	2,520	89.0
Eastern Rural	E Randolph	Northern Rhodesian African National Congress	201		50	2,244	2,520	89.0
Eastern Rural	Oliver Carruthers	Liberal Party	195		50	2,244	2,520	89.0
Kitwe East	Jerry Steyn	United Federal Party	2,328		43	2,610	2,794	93.4
Kitwe East	G E Mushikwa	United National Independence Party	179		43	2,610	2,794	93.4
Kitwe East	J Percy	Liberal Party	60		43	2,610	2,794	93.4
Kitwe West	Hugh Stanley	United Federal Party	1,936		50	2,400	2,624	91.5
Kitwe West	U G Mwila	United National Independence Party	311		50	2,400	2,624	91.5
Kitwe West	K A Mills	Liberal Party	103		50	2,400	2,624	91.5
Livingstone	Election postponed due to death of candidate							
Luanshya-Kansenji	Cecil Dennistoun Burney	United Federal Party	1,638		43	2,262	2,458	92.0
Luanshya-Kansenji	Thakorbhai Desai	United National Independence Party	390		43	2,262	2,458	92.0
Luanshya-Kansenji	M W Wijnberg	Liberal Party	191		43	2,262	2,458	92.0
Lusaka East	Gabriel Musumbulwa	United Federal Party	1,806		15	2,460	2,713	90.7
Lusaka East	R Allard	Liberal Party	297		15	2,460	2,713	90.7
Lusaka East	Alan Wateridge	Independent	236		15	2,460	2,713	90.7
Lusaka East	L Terry	Northern Rhodesian African National Congress	79		15	2,460	2,713	90.7
Lusaka East	F J G Triegaardt	Rhodesia Republican Party	27		15	2,460	2,713	90.7
Lusaka West	Hugh Mitchley	United Federal Party	1,607		78	2,592	2,863	90.5
Lusaka West	Eric Kreft	Independent	633		78	2,592	2,863	90.5
Lusaka West	G S Mwanza	Northern Rhodesian African National Congress	152		78	2,592	2,863	90.5
Lusaka West	S Hutt	Liberal Party	122		78	2,592	2,863	90.5
Mufulira	Pieter Wulff	United Federal Party	2,224		14	2,575	2,752	93.6
Mufulira	Alexander Stevens	Independent	337		14	2,575	2,752	93.6
Ndola East	Thomas Lawler	United Federal Party	1,728		38	2,198	2,401	91.5
Ndola East	T M D Ntine	United National Independence Party	221		38	2,198	2,401	91.5
Ndola East	C D Smith	Liberal Party	211		38	2,198	2,401	91.5
Northern Rural	John Mwanakatwe	United National Independence Party	1,172		37	1,646	1,900	86.6
Northern Rural	V A Shona	Northern Rhodesian African National Congress	297		37	1,646	1,900	86.6
Northern Rural	U J Moffat	Independent	140		37	1,646	1,900	86.6
Roan	Hendrick Liebenberg	United Federal Party	1,564		46	1,986	2,302	86.3
Roan	M K Nayooto	United National Independence Party	309		46	1,986	2,302	86.3
Roan	W Kirby	Liberal Party	67		46	1,986	2,302	86.3
Southern Rural	John Burnside	United Federal Party	588		61	1,516	1,726	87.8
Southern Rural	Maskekwa Nalumango	United National Independence Party	491		61	1,516	1,726	87.8
Southern Rural	G A Patel	Northern Rhodesian African National Congress	296		61	1,516	1,726	87.8
Southern Rural	R Harvey	Liberal Party	42		61	1,516	1,726	87.8
Southern Rural	C F Kirstein	Rhodesia Republican Party	38		61	1,516	1,726	87.8
Western Rural	Norman Coates	United Federal Party	1,427		40	2,146	2,348	91.4
Western Rural	Joseph Shaw	United National Independence Party	601		40	2,146	2,348	91.4
Western Rural	R E Farmer	Liberal Party	78		40	2,146	2,348	91.4
Lower roll
Bangweulu	Kenneth Kaunda	United National Independence Party	4,347		126	4,702	5,134	91.6
Bangweulu	H Kasokola	Northern Rhodesian African National Congress	229		126	4,702	5,134	91.6
Barotseland East	Arthur Wina	United National Independence Party	1,057		66	1,188	1,460	81.4
Barotseland East	F L Suu	Barotse National Party	65		66	1,188	1,460	81.4
Barotseland West	Mubiana Nalilungwe	United National Independence Party	688		151	985	1,271	77.5
Barotseland West	Griffiths Mukande	Barotse National Party	69		151	985	1,271	77.5
Barotseland West	Isaac Singulwani	Northern Rhodesian African National Congress	42		151	985	1,271	77.5
Barotseland West	B M Akombelwa	Liberal Party	35		151	985	1,271	77.5
Copperbelt Central	Alexander Grey Zulu	United National Independence Party	14,371		56	16,474	19,460	84.7
Copperbelt Central	L B Lombe	Northern Rhodesian African National Congress	1,947		56	16,474	19,460	84.7
Copperbelt Central	E M Daimon	United Federal Party	100		56	16,474	19,460	84.7
Copperbelt East	John Chisata	United National Independence Party	11,896		447	13,172	14,933	88.2
Copperbelt East	Prise Chanda	Northern Rhodesian African National Congress	829		447	13,172	14,933	88.2
Copperbelt West	Sikota Wina	United National Independence Party	5,217		298	5,740	6,683	85.9
Copperbelt West	N J Chindefu	Northern Rhodesian African National Congress	225		298	5,740	6,683	85.9
Eastern	Wesley Nyirenda	United National Independence Party	1,655		305	2,783	3,120	89.2
Eastern	Shadrach Soko	Northern Rhodesian African National Congress	792		305	2,783	3,120	89.2
Eastern	N D Chabinga	Liberal Party	31		305	2,783	3,120	89.2
Lusaka Rural	Edward Liso	Northern Rhodesian African National Congress	1,606		199	2,894	3,399	85.1
Lusaka Rural	Solomon Kalulu	United National Independence Party	1,061		199	2,894	3,399	85.1
Lusaka Rural	M J Nkabika	United Federal Party	28		199	2,894	3,399	85.1
Midlands	Elijah Mudenda	United National Independence Party	7,819		827	11,926	14,569	81.9
Midlands	Job Michello	Northern Rhodesian African National Congress	3,280		827	11,926	14,569	81.9
Muchinga	Aaron Milner	United National Independence Party	2,742		109	2,934	3,211	91.4
Muchinga	Cuthbert Sinyangwe	Northern Rhodesian African National Congress	55		109	2,934	3,211	91.4
Muchinga	G M Kabichi	United Federal Party	28		109	2,934	3,211	91.4
Northern	Simon Kapwepwe	United National Independence Party	3,840		124	4,075	4,534	89.9
Northern	Dauti Yamba	Northern Rhodesian African National Congress	87		124	4,075	4,534	89.9
Northern	D B Lisubu	United Federal Party	24		124	4,075	4,534	89.9
North-Western	Samuel Mblishi	United National Independence Party	1,419		83	1,783	1,953	91.3
North-Western	C S Chizawu	Northern Rhodesian African National Congress	264		83	1,783	1,953	91.3
North-Western	Y Chikombe	Liberal Party	17		83	1,783	1,953	91.3
South-Eastern	Reuben Kamanga	United National Independence Party	1,468		320	2,476	2,872	86.2
South-Eastern	Harry Thornicroft	Northern Rhodesian African National Congress	688		320	2,476	2,872	86.2
Southern	Chiwala Banda	Northern Rhodesian African National Congress	2,300		184	3,936	4,444	88.6
Southern	Gwale Habanyama	United National Independence Party	1,452		184	3,936	4,444	88.6
South-Western	Harry Nkumbula	Northern Rhodesian African National Congress	3,924		193	4,733	5,212	90.8
South-Western	C S Mukando	United National Independence Party	616		193	4,733	5,212	90.8
Source: Mulford, pp189–190

National seats
Constituency	Candidate	Party	Votes								Notes
Constituency	Candidate	Party	European		African		Upper roll		Lower roll		Notes
Constituency	Candidate	Party	Votes	%	Votes	%	Votes	%	Votes	%	Notes
Chambeshi (African)	Matthew Mwendapole	United National Independence Party	69	1.6	11,286	93.6	774	15.0	10,581	93.8	
Chambeshi (African)	Peter Chibuye	United Federal Party	4,082	93.3	69	0.6	4,094	79.6	57	0.5	
Chambeshi (African)	Sykes Ndilila	Northern Rhodesian African National Congress	49	1.1	645	5.3	97	1.9	597	5.3	
Chambeshi (African)	F M Chitimukulu	Liberal Party	173	4.0	58	0.5	180	3.5	51	0.5	
Chambeshi (European)	Stewart Gore-Browne	United National Independence Party	55	1.3	11,264	93.4	756	14.7	10,563	93.6	
Chambeshi (European)	John Mitchell	United Federal Party	4,152	94.9	669	5.5	4,207	81.8	614	5.4	
Chambeshi (European)	R L Moffat	Liberal Party	166	3.8	125	1.0	182	3.5	109	1.0	
Kabompo (2 seats)	M. Chamululu	Liberal Party	No candidate achieved the vote share required								
Kabompo (2 seats)	T.G. MacKay	Liberal Party	No candidate achieved the vote share required								
Kabompo (2 seats)	K.T. Lewis	Northern Rhodesian African National Congress	No candidate achieved the vote share required								
Kabompo (2 seats)	R. Mangangu	Northern Rhodesian African National Congress	No candidate achieved the vote share required								
Kabompo (2 seats)	P. Byrne	United Federal Party	No candidate achieved the vote share required								
Kabompo (2 seats)	I.H. Nkoloma	United Federal Party	No candidate achieved the vote share required								
Kabompo (2 seats)	Andrew Sardanis	United National Independence Party	No candidate achieved the vote share required								
Kabompo (2 seats)	William Nkanza	United National Independence Party	No candidate achieved the vote share required								
Kafubu (African)	D C Mwiinga	United National Independence Party	65	1.2	12,081	92.9	767	12.7	11,379	93.1	
Kafubu (African)	Ernest Kapota	Northern Rhodesian African National Congress	4,762	90.7	808	6.2	4,828	80.0	742	6.1	
Kafubu (African)	Z J Kafulubiti	Liberal Party	422	8.0	111	0.9	438	7.3	95	0.8	
Kafubu (European)	Merfyn Temple	United National Independence Party	65	1.2	12,030	93.2	688	11.6	11,407	93.4	
Kafubu (European)	Rodney Malcomson	United Federal Party	4,853	92.5	769	6.0	4,910	82.6	712	5.8	
Kafubu (European)	L B S Escourt	Liberal Party	329	6.3	111	0.9	343	5.8	97	0.8	
Lower Kafue (African)	Robinson Puta	United National Independence Party	93	2.7	6,769	71.8	683	16.0	6,179	71.4	
Lower Kafue (African)	Francis Chembe	Northern Rhodesian African National Congress	3,252	93.3	2,570	27.2	3,442	80.6	2,380	27.5	Elected
Lower Kafue (African)	I E Kalima	Liberal Party	142	4.1	94	1.0	146	3.4	90	1.0	
Lower Kafue (European)	A Tidder	United National Independence Party	75	2.2	6,699	71.0	667	15.6	6,107	70.6	
Lower Kafue (European)	A H Duff	Northern Rhodesian African National Congress	19	0.5	213	2.3	40	0.9	192	2.2	
Lower Kafue (European)	Jack Eaton	United Federal Party	3,166	90.8	2,304	24.4	3,314	77.6	2,156	24.9	Elected
Lower Kafue (European)	G Percy	Liberal Party	159	4.6	108	1.1	172	4.0	95	1.1	
Lower Kafue (European)	H J Butler	Rhodesia Republican Party	68	2.0	109	1.2	78	1.8	99	1.1	
Luangwa (African)	Isaac Mumpanshya	United National Independence Party	148	4.2	5,418	63.8	767	17.6	4,799	62.5	
Luangwa (African)	Philemon Zindana	United Federal Party	2,769	78.2	1,645	19.4	2,860	65.6	1,554	20.3	Elected
Luangwa (African)	Alfred Gondwe	Liberal Party	624	17.6	1,429	16.8	732	16.8	1,321	17.2	
Luangwa (European)	James John Skinner	United National Independence Party	126	3.6	5,285	62.2	717	16.4	4,694	61.2	
Luangwa (European)	Charles Cousins	Northern Rhodesian African National Congress	2,711	76.6	2,929	34.5	2,903	66.6	2,737	35.7	Elected
Luangwa (European)	John Moffat	Liberal Party	525	14.8	209	2.5	553	12.7	181	2.4	
Luangwa (European)	A Dahl	Rhodesia Republican Party	179	5.1	69	0.8	186	4.3	62	0.8	
Luapula (2 seats)	R.H. Horward	Liberal Party	No candidate achieved the vote share required								
Luapula (2 seats)	Lakement Ngandu	Liberal Party	No candidate achieved the vote share required								
Luapula (2 seats)	Francis Stubbs	Northern Rhodesian African National Congress	No candidate achieved the vote share required								
Luapula (2 seats)	B.C. Chisunka	Northern Rhodesian African National Congress	No candidate achieved the vote share required								
Luapula (2 seats)	A.E. Beech	United Federal Party	No candidate achieved the vote share required								
Luapula (2 seats)	A.M.T. Mubanga	United Federal Party	No candidate achieved the vote share required								
Luapula (2 seats)	Wilson Chakulya	United National Independence Party	No candidate achieved the vote share required								
Luapula (2 seats)	Charles Thornicroft	United National Independence Party	No candidate achieved the vote share required								
Zambezi (2 seats)	G.B.M. Chalinga	Barotse National Party	No candidate achieved the vote share required								
Zambezi (2 seats)	Harry Franklin	Liberal Party	No candidate achieved the vote share required								
Zambezi (2 seats)	E.N. Kamitondo	Liberal Party	No candidate achieved the vote share required								
Zambezi (2 seats)	W.J. Curtis	Northern Rhodesian African National Congress	No candidate achieved the vote share required								
Zambezi (2 seats)	J.M. Mayanda	Northern Rhodesian African National Congress	No candidate achieved the vote share required								
Zambezi (2 seats)	G.A. Smith	Rhodesia Republic Party	No candidate achieved the vote share required								
Zambezi (2 seats)	Maurice Rabb	United Federal Party	No candidate achieved the vote share required								
Zambezi (2 seats)	J.S.S. Anderson	United National Independence Party	No candidate achieved the vote share required								
Zambezi (2 seats)	Nakatindi Yeta Nganga	United National Independence Party	No candidate achieved the vote share required								
Special National; Constituency	Kashibhai Patel	Independent (UNIP)	1,071	62.3							Elected
Special National; Constituency	J D Naik	Northern Rhodesian African National Congress	519	30.2							
Special National; Constituency	I M Bagas	Independent	129	7.5							
Source: Gray Zulu, Mulford, Federation of Rhodesia and Nyasaland Newsletter

=== By-elections ===
Upper roll
Constituency	Candidate	Party	Votes	%	Notes
Livingstone	James MacMillan	United Federal Party	1,584	72.8	Elected
Livingstone	R.V.Nayee	United National Independence Party	417	19.2	
Livingstone	N. Mabutwe	Northern Rhodesian African National Congress	176	8.1	
Invalid/blank votes			88	–	
Total			2,265	100	
Source: Northern Rhodesia Elections Office

National seats
Constituency	Candidate	Party	Votes				Notes
Constituency	Candidate	Party	European		African		Notes
Constituency	Candidate	Party	Votes	%	Votes	%	Notes
Chambeshi (African)	D C Mwiinga	United National Independence Party	110	2.8	10,321	92.2	No candidate elected
Chambeshi (African)	L B Lombe	Northern Rhodesian African National Congress	3,302	84.6	742	6.6	No candidate elected
Chambeshi (African)	H Lungu	United Federal Party	494	12.6	137	1.2	No candidate elected
Chambeshi (European)	Stewart Gore-Browne	United National Independence Party	101	2.6	10,567	94.3	No candidate elected
Chambeshi (European)	John Mitchell	United Federal Party		97.4		5.7	No candidate elected
Kabompo (2 seats)	William Nkanza	United National Independence Party	140	4.8	11,439	93.9	No candidate elected
Kabompo (2 seats)	Andrew Sardanis	United National Independence Party	139	4.7	11,363	93.2	No candidate elected
Kabompo (2 seats)	P Byrne	United Federal Party	2,696	91.8	61	0.5	No candidate elected
Kabompo (2 seats)	A H Duff	Northern Rhodesian African National Congress	1,223	41.6	609	5.0	No candidate elected
Kabompo (2 seats)	I H Nkoloma	United Federal Party	1,588	54.1	203	1.7	No candidate elected
Kabompo (2 seats)	R Mangangu	Northern Rhodesian African National Congress	88	3.0	693	5.7	No candidate elected
Kafubu (African)	T D Mtine	United National Independence Party	237	5.2	11,001	91.9	No candidate elected
Kafubu (African)	G M Kabichi	United Federal Party	4,084	90.3	146	1.2	No candidate elected
Kafubu (African)	J M Mayanda	Northern Rhodesian African National Congress	201	4.5	827	6.9	No candidate elected
Kafubu (European)	Joseph Shaw	United National Independence Party	167	3.7	11,026	92.1	No candidate elected
Kafubu (European)	Rodney Malcomson	United Federal Party	4,278	94.6	164	1.3	No candidate elected
Kafubu (European)	L Terry	Northern Rhodesian African National Congress	77	1.7	784	6.6	No candidate elected
Luapula (2 seats)	Matthew Mwendapole	United National Independence Party	50	2.1	9,761	87.0	Not elected
Luapula (2 seats)	Charles Thornicroft	United National Independence Party	60	2.6	9,692	86.5	Not elected
Luapula (2 seats)	A E Beech	United Federal Party	2,151	92.2	101	0.9	Not elected
Luapula (2 seats)	Francis Stubbs	Northern Rhodesian African National Congress	628	26.9	1,390	12.4	Elected
Luapula (2 seats)	M T Mubanga	United Federal Party	1,672	71.6	136	1.1	Not elected
Luapula (2 seats)	C E Kapota	Northern Rhodesian African National Congress	107	4.6	1,352	12.1	Not elected
Zambezi (2 seats)	Job Michello	Northern Rhodesian African National Congress	764	34.7	5,506	58.0	Elected
Zambezi (2 seats)	Merfyn Temple	United National Independence Party	48	2.2	3,589	37.8	Not elected
Zambezi (2 seats)	W J Curtis	Northern Rhodesian African National Congress	133	6.0	5,345	65.2	Not elected
Zambezi (2 seats)	Nakatindi Yeta Nganga	United National Independence Party	49	2.2	3,878	40.8	Not elected
Zambezi (2 seats)	Maurice Rabb	United Federal Party	1,983	90.1	207	2.2	Not elected
Zambezi (2 seats)	G B Mapani	Barotse National Party	924	42.0	236	2.5	Not elected
Zambezi (2 seats)	G A Smith	Rhodesia Republican Party	317	14.4	161	1.7	Not elected
Zambezi (2 seats)	W E Barret	Independent	186	8.4	81	0.8	Not elected
Source: East Africa and Rhodesia, Gray Zulu

== Aftermath ==
With almost all candidates losing their deposits, the three Liberal Party ministers (John Moffat, Harry Franklin and Alfred Gondwe) resigned immediately after the elections. In mid-November the party announced that it was disbanding, with members advised to join or support UNIP instead.

Nkumbula held talks with both Kaunda and Roberts about the formation of a coalition government, saying he would consider a coalition with UNIP "if Kaunda and his henchmen made a statement unreservedly condemning Communism and the use of violence and intimidation.", and a coalition with the UFP if "thy stated that they wanted to see the end of political federation and its replacement with only an economic association". Kaunda subsequently released a statement stating "I believe that both Mr. Nkumbula and myself should forget the bitterness of the past and do what we can to establish majority rule in this country. On 14 December Governor Evelyn Hone announced the formation of a coalition government by UNIP and the NRARNC.

Minister	Party	Position
Kenneth Kaunda	United National Independence Party	Minister of Local Government and Social Welfare
Simon Kapwepwe	United National Independence Party	Minister of African Agriculture
Harry Nkumbula	Northern Rhodesian African National Congress	Minister of African Education
Trevor Gardner	Ex officio	Minister of Finance
Reuben Kamanga	United National Independence Party	Minister of Labour and Mines
Charles Cousins	Northern Rhodesian African National Congress	Minister of Land and Natural Resources
Brian Andre Doyle	Ex officio	Minister for Legal Affairs and Attorney General
Frederick Thomas	Ex officio	Minister of Native Affairs
Francis Stubbs	Northern Rhodesian African National Congress	Minister of Transport and Works
Richard Luyt	Ex officio	Chief Secretary
Source: East Africa and Rhodesia

== See also ==
- List of members of the Legislative Council of Northern Rhodesia (1962–1964)
