= Andrew Sardanis =

Zambian journalist and businessman (1931–2021)

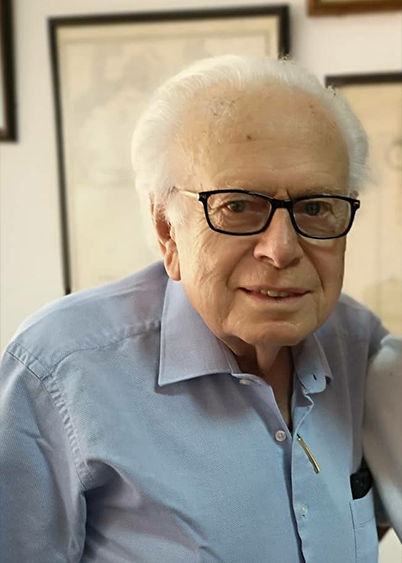
- Born: Andrew Sotiris Sardanis; 13 March 1931; British Cyprus
- Died: 28 February 2021 (aged 89); Lusaka CFB Hospital
- Occupations: Journalist; Writer; Businessman
- Years active: 1950–2021
- Notable credits: Zambia: The First 50 Years (2014); A venture in Africa (2007); Africa (2003)
- Awards: Order of the Eagle

Andrew Sotiris Sardanis (Greek: Ανδρέας Σωτήρης Σαρδάνης; 13 March 1931 – 28 February 2021) was a notable journalist and businessman of Cypriot-Zambian origin. He gained recognition for his involvement in Zambia's independence liberation movement and played a significant role in the formation of Zambia's first administration. Sardanis also implemented various economic policies in Zambia between 1965 and 1970.

Sardanis held prominent positions in the Zambian government, including serving as the Permanent Secretary in the Ministry of State Participation and Chairman of the Industrial Development Corporation. He was widely recognized for his contributions towards the economic development of Zambia.

In recognition of his service, Sardanis was awarded Zambia's highest civil decoration, the Order of the Eagle of Zambia, by President Edgar Lungu in 2019.

== Early life ==
Andrew was born in colonial Cyprus and migrated to Northern Rhodesia (now Zambia) in October 1950, when he was 19, as part of a group of migrants displaced by the end of World War II. He spent most of his early life working for his brother in law in a transport company which operated between the Copperbelt and North-Western Province. In his mid-twenties he owned and operated North-Western Trading. By 1957 he had started Mwaiseni stores. He was one of the few white settlers to have actively supported the black liberation movement and he trained. Advanced Zambians in his own business, treating them as partners and fellow shareholders and also provided a group of shops that allowed Zambians to transact normally. As a firm anti-colonialist he joined UNIP and in the 1962 elections, he stood as UNIP candidate for Kabompo. He became a passionate freedom fighter and was strongly involved in the independence movement.

== Business ==
In 1984 he formed Meridien International Bank Limited (MIBL) in the Bahamas. In 1991, MIBL purchased a network of 11 banks from the French liquidator of Banque Internationale pour l'Afrique Occidentale (BIAO). Registered in Luxembourg, Meridien BIAO was 74% owned by MIBL, which had a banking licence in the Bahamas. The African Development Bank held a 10% stake and the West African Development Bank (BOAD) had a 16% holding. It was capitalised at about $100m. The group reported a net profit of $3.26m in 1993, the last year for which audited figures are available, but after currency translations its reserves declined by $15.2m in that year.

MIBL is owned by Meridien Corporation, which is in turn owned by ITM International, a Luxembourg-registered private company controlled by the Sardanis family trust.

== Death ==
Andrew died on 28 February 2021, at CFB Hospital in Lusaka. He was 89.

== Publications ==
- Zambia: The First 50 Years (2014)
- A venture in Africa (2007)
- Africa: Another Side of the Coin: Northern Rhodesia's Final Years and Zambia's Nationhood (2003)
