= Football Association of Zambia =

Governing body for association football in Zambia

CAF
- Short name: FAZ
- Founded: 1929
- Headquarters: Football House, Lusaka, Zambia
- FIFA affiliation: 1964
- CAF affiliation: 1964
- COSAFA affiliation: 1997
- President: (Zambia) Keith Mweemba (2025–present)
- General Secretary: (Zambia) Reuben Kamanga

The Football Association of Zambia is the governing body of association football in Zambia founded in 1929 and based at the "Football House" on Alick Nkhata Road in Lusaka, the country's capital.

Affiliated to CAF and FIFA in 1964 and COSAFA in 1997, it organizes the local league and the country's national team.

== Executive committee ==
- President (Zambia) Keith Mweemba
- Vice President (Zambia) Justin Mumba
- Women's Representative (Zambia) Priscilla Katoba
- Zambian Premier League Chaiman (Zambia) Kephas Katongo
- Member (Zambia) Jordan Maliti
- Member (Zambia) Collins Mukwala
- Member (Zambia) Danny Pule
- Member (Zambia) Chris Kamuna
- Member (Zambia) David Simwinga
- Member (Zambia) Patrick Ndhlovu
- Member (Zambia) Mwansa Kapyanga
- Member (Zambia) Mweemba Mujala
- Member (Zambia) Francis Hamfwiti
- Member (Zambia) Arthur Kamulosu

== National teams ==
The association governs and controls the Zambian national men's and women's teams which represents the country in international association football. The men's national team was commonly known during the 1980s as the "KK 11" after Dr. Kenneth Kaunda ("KK"), the founder of Zambia who was its president from independence in 1964 until the shift to a democratic multiparty state in 1991 when it changed nicknames to the Chipolopolo or the "Copper Bullets".

The team has appeared in the final of the Africa Cup of Nations thrice, winning it once against Ivory Coast.

== Coaching staff ==
- Head coach : (Zambia) Moses Sichone (2025-present)
- Assistant coach : Dabid Chilufya (March 2017–present)
- Goalkeeper coach : (Zambia) Stephen Mwansa (March 2017–present)
- Technical Advisor : (Zambia) Danny Kabwe (2016–present)
- Team Manager : (Zambia) Chris Chibuye (March 2017–present)
- Team Doctor : (Zambia) George Magwende
- Physiotherapist : (Zambia) Davies Mulenga
- Physiotherapist : (Zambia) Gibson Chaloba
- Women's Coaching Staff
- Head Coach: Nora Häuptle
- Assistant Coach: Florence Mwila
- Assistant coach: Charity Nthala
- Goalkeeper coach: Yona Phiri
