= 1968 Zambian general election =

- 19 December 1968
- President
- Turnout: 87.12%
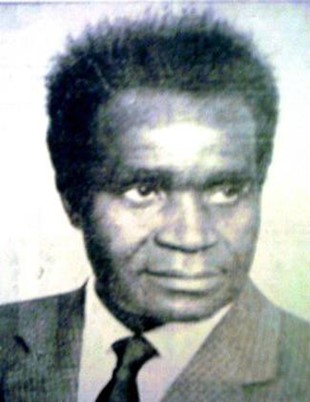

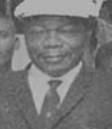
Nominee	Kenneth Kaunda	Harry Nkumbula
Party	UNIP	ZANC
Popular vote	1,079,970	240,017
Percentage	81.82%	18.18%
- Results by province
President before election
Kenneth Kaunda
UNIP
Elected President
Kenneth Kaunda
UNIP
- National Assembly
Party	Leader	Vote %	Seats	+/–
UNIP	Kenneth Kaunda	73.19	81	+26
ZANC	Harry Nkumbula	25.40	23	+13
Independents	Hugh Mitchley	1.40	1	+1
This lists parties that won seats. See the complete results below.
Results by constituency

General elections were held in Zambia on 19 December 1968 to elect the National Assembly and President. The first post-independence polls saw incumbent Kenneth Kaunda retain his post as president, whilst his United National Independence Party, the only party to field candidates in all 105 constituencies, won 81 of the 105 seats in the National Assembly. Voter turnout was 82.5% in the parliamentary election, but 87.1% in the presidential election.

The only other contestants in the National Assembly elections were the Zambian African National Congress (73 candidates), and three independents. The United Party, which had been established in 1966, was banned in 1968, with many of its members absorbed by the ZANC. The election campaign was marred by violence, with UNIP members in Northern and Luapula Provinces blocking ZANC candidates from lodging nomination papers, resulting in 30 UNIP candidates running unopposed. Nevertheless, the election saw a swing towards the ZANC; four ministers lost their seats.

In 1972, the Kaunda government announced its intention to make UNIP the only legally permitted party in the country. This was formalised with a new constitution that was promulgated in August 1973. As a result, the 1968 elections were the last multiparty elections held in Zambia until 1991.

== Electoral system ==
Of the 110 members of the National Assembly, 105 were elected by the first-past-the-post system in single-member constituencies, with a further five appointed by the President.

The President was elected using a first-past-the-post double simultaneous vote system; candidates for the National Assembly declared which candidate they endorsed for president when they lodged their nomination papers, and those who failed to do so were disqualified. Voters had only one vote, so that voting for a parliamentary candidate automatically meant also voting for the presidential candidate to which the parliamentary candidate had pledged. In constituencies where there was only one parliamentary candidate returned unopposed, all registered voters were "counted" as having voted for the MP's pledged presidential candidate despite the fact no actual voting took place, effectively disenfranchising them in the presidential election.

== Results ==
=== President ===
Candidate	Party	Votes	%
Kenneth Kaunda	United National Independence Party	1,079,970	81.82
Harry Nkumbula	Zambian African National Congress	240,017	18.18
Total		1,319,987	100.00
Valid votes		1,319,987	95.41
Invalid/blank votes		63,490	4.59
Total votes		1,383,477	100.00
Registered voters/turnout		1,587,966	87.12
Source: Nohlen et al.

=== National Assembly ===
Party	Votes	%	Seats	+/–
United National Independence Party	657,764	73.19	81	+26
Zambian African National Congress	228,277	25.40	23	+13
Independents	12,619	1.40	1	+1
Presidential appointees			5	New
Total	898,660	100.00	110	+35
Valid votes	898,660	93.40		
Invalid/blank votes	63,490	6.60		
Total votes	962,150	100.00		
Registered voters/turnout	1,166,637	82.47		
Source: Nohlen et al.

== See also ==
- List of members of the National Assembly of Zambia (1969–73)
