= Orders, decorations, and medals of Zambia =

The following is a list of orders, decorations, and medals of Zambia throughout history.

== Orders ==
The orders are:

- Order of the Eagle of Zambia
- Order of the Grand Companion of Freedom
- Distinguished Service Order

== Presidential decorations ==
Presidential decorations are:

- Insignia of Honour
- President’s Insignia of Honour
- President’s Insignia of Mercy

== Medals ==
Medals are:

=== General ===
- 10 Years of Independence Medal
- National Award for Excellence in Science and Technology
- Red Cross Medal

=== Army medals ===
The Namibian Army medals are:

- Army Meritorious Service Medal
- Army Long Service and Good Conduct Medal
- Defense Force Operations Medal
- Army Commander’s Medal
- Army Brigade Commander’s Medal
- Army Service Medal
- Army United Nations Medal
- Operation Bandits Nest Medal
- Operation Impala Medal
- Operation Ingwee Medal
- Defence Force Foreign Cooperation Medal
- Operation Safeguard Medal
- Operation Ngwenya Medal
- Operation Hyena Medal
- Operation Zebra Medal

=== Air Force medals ===
Namibian Air Force medals are:

- Air Force Medal of Courage
- Air Force Commissioned Service Medal
- Air Force Long Service and Good Conduct Medal

=== Police Force medals ===
Namibian Police Force medals are:

- Police Distinguished Service Medal
- Police Meritorious Service Medal
- Police Long Service and Good Conduct Medal
