= Mkushi North =

Zambian National Assembly constituency

Mkushi North is a constituency of the National Assembly of Zambia. It covers the northern part of Mkushi District in Central Province, including the town of Mkushi.

== List of MPs ==
Election year	MP	Party
Mkushi North
1968	Musonda Chambeshi	United National Independence Party
Mkushi Boma
1973	Joseph Katampi	United National Independence Party
1978	Leonard Kombe	United National Independence Party
Mkushi North
1983	Leonard Kombe	United National Independence Party
1988	Leonard Kombe	United National Independence Party
1991	Rolf Shenton	Movement for Multi-Party Democracy
1996	Jack Chipindi	Movement for Multi-Party Democracy
2001	Webby Kamwendo	Movement for Multi-Party Democracy
2006	Lucy Changwe	Movement for Multi-Party Democracy
2011	Knorrasco Mutale	Movement for Multi-Party Democracy
2013 (by-election)	Ingrid Mphande	Patriotic Front
2016	Doreen Mwape	Patriotic Front
2021	Christopher Chibuye	Patriotic Front
2026	Mabvuto Nyirenda	National Reconciliation Party for Unity and Prosperity
