= OEZ =

OEZ may refer to:

- Olympia-Einkaufszentrum, a shopping mall opened in 1972 in the Moosach district of Munich, Germany
  - Olympia-Einkaufszentrum (Munich U-Bahn), a U-Bahn station in Munich, serving the Olympia-Einkaufszentrum
- FK OEZ Letohrad, a football club located in Letohrad, Czech Republic
- Order of the Eagle of Zambia, a civilian honor in Zambia
