= Ali Simbule =

Zambian politician

Alinani M. Simbule

Minister of State for Women and Youth.
- In office 1970–1970
- President: Kenneth Kaunda

Personal details
- Born: 1935
- Party: United National Independence Party
- Spouse: Monica Simbule

Ali Simbule is a former Zambian politician and diplomat.

== Early life ==
Simbule was born in 1935. He studied at the University of Oxford.

== Career ==
On January 7, 1965, he was accredited as a High Commissioner in Dar es Salaam. In April 1966 the British government gave the Agrément to the Zambian government, stating that Simbule would be received as High commissioner (Commonwealth) in London, making him the senior Zambian diplomat to England. On July 21, 1966, he was accredited by Ugandan president Milton Obote as High commissioner (Commonwealth) in Kampala (Uganda).

On January 13, 1966, at the Ministerial Conference of the Commonwealth in Lagos, sanctions against the regime at Sailsbury were discussed. Harold Wilson pictorially described expectations of already decided sanctions against Rhodesia, such as a Petrol embargo. The sanctions would be increasingly biting.

On April 14, he declared, with regard to the acrimonious sanctions against Rhodesia, that Britain was a humiliated toothless bulldog, and forecasted that if the Africans rose in Rhodesia, then Britain would defend her kith and kin.

On July 7, 1967, Colonel John Hugo brought him to Buckingham Palace, where Elizabeth II received his Letter of commission.

On April 25, 1969, he was received by Léopold Sédar Senghor as the first Zambian High Commissioner (Commonwealth) in Senegal.

From 1968 to 1972, he was also the first Zambian ambassador in Abidjan (Ivory Coast), based in Dakar.

In 1969, he was a Permanent Secretary to the Ministry of National Guidance and engaged in the Zambian Library.

In 1970, he became the Minister of State for Women and Youth.

From 1973 to 1980, he was Secretary General of the United National Independence Party.

On 25 January 1971, Ugandan rebel Idi Amin forced the then-president of Uganda Milton Obote with M4 Sherman tanks into exile to Tanzania, under the protection of Julius Nyerere. Thus, the two critics of British policy within the Commonwealth of Nations in southern Africa were pushed into the defensive. On January 26, 1971, Simbule declared that the words of the first Zambian President Kenneth Kaunda were considered the joke of the day.

In 1980, Simbule was sentenced to 18 months of hard labor for illegal possession of emeralds.
