= Matthew Mwendapole =

Northern Rhodesian trade unionist

Matthew R. Mwendapole
- Occupations: Trade unionist, teacher
- Known for: Secretary of Nchanga branch of AMWU; militant labor activism
- Political party: United National Independence Party

Matthew R. Mwendapole was a Northern Rhodesian trade union leader.

== Biography ==
In 1946 Mwendapole was transferred to the Copperbelt as a secondary teacher. Despite never having worked in the mining industry he was elected Secretary of the Nchanga branch of the African Mineworkers' Union (AMWU). Mwendapole was more militant than the President of the union, Lawrence Katilungu, and was prominent in the internal union opposition to his leadership. In 1954 Mwendapole led the Nchanga miners out on strike in sympathy with the African General Workers' Union, in defiance of direct instructions from Katilungu not to stop work.

In 1956, following an extended period of strikes, the Northern Rhodesian government declared a State of Emergency on the Copperbelt and immediately arrested a large number of AMWU leaders, including Mwendapole. Following his release from detention Mwendapole was re-employed by the union as head office clerk, but was barred from visiting any of the mine townships by the mining companies.

Mwendapole was briefly mentioned in the British Parliament in 1957. The Labour MP John Stonehouse asked why Mwendapole had been refused a passport. The Conservative MP Alan Lennox-Boyd, Secretary of State for the Colonies, replied that he had not applied for one.

He contested the October 1962 general elections as the United National Independence Party candidate in Chambeshi, but failed to be elected to the Legislative Council. He then contested a by-election in Luapula in December 1962, but was again unsuccessful.
