= Doreen Mwape =

Zambian politician (born 1962)

Doreen Mwape (born 15 January 1962) is a Zambian social worker, businessperson and politician. From 2016 to 2021 she was an MP in the National Assembly of Zambia, as the Patriotic Front representative for Mkushi North.

== Life ==
Doreen Mwape was born on 15 January 1962. She gained a BA in development studies before becoming a social worker. In July 2016 she was selected as the Patriotic Front candidate for Mkushi North, describing herself as a local businesswoman. In the 2016 Zambian general election she was elected MP for Mkushi North, succeeding Ingrid Mpande.

Mwape was a member of the Zambian Public Accounts Committee. In 2018 she asked North-Western Province Permanent Secretary Ephraim Mateyo why a salary had continued to be paid to an employee on study leave who had not returned to her post. In December 2020 she asked Provincial Permanent Secretary Bernard Chomba how the Central Province administration was financing the payroll for 539 officers who did not appear on the budgeted and financial statements. In January 2021 she asked Secretary to the Treasury Fredson Yamba why the Ministry of Health had entered into a contract without due diligence. She later asked why Yamba had given retrospective authority for funds to be transferred from the treasury to a Ministry of Health emergency account.

In 2020 Mwape asked how many solar-powered hammer mills had been installed in Mkushi North as of December 2019.
