= Zambian African National Congress (1958–1959) =

Political party in Northern Rhodesia

- Founder: Kenneth Kaunda
- Founded: October 1958
- Banned: March 1959
- Split from: Northern Rhodesia African National Congress

The Zambian African National Congress (ZANC) was a political party in Northern Rhodesia, founded by Kenneth Kaunda in 1958 after splitting from the Northern Rhodesia African National Congress, which was itself later renamed the Zambian African National Congress.

== History ==
The ZANC was formed in October 1958, following a split from the Northern Rhodesian African National Congress led by Harry Nkumbula, which Kaunda regarded as being too moderate. However, it was banned in March the following year and Kaunda imprisoned. Upon his release, Kaunda joined United National Independence Party in 1960.

In 1964, after Northern Rhodesia achieved independence as Zambia, the Northern Rhodesian African National Congress renamed itself the Zambian African National Congress.
