= Tilyenji Kaunda =

Zambian pojlitician

Tilyenji Kaunda (born 1954) is a Zambian politician. Until 5 April 2021 he served as leader of the United National Independence Party (UNIP)

== Early life ==
Tilyeni Kaunda is the son of Kenneth Kaunda, former President of Zambia.

== Career ==
UNIP was led by his father from 1960 to 2000. Tilyenji assumed the leadership of UNIP in 2001, but on 5 April 2021 he lost internal party elections for the position of party President.

He was replaced by Reverend Trevor Mwamba, an Anglican priest who had been living in Germany. Reverend Mwamba is the husband of the Botswana ambassador to Germany.

Under his leadership, UNIP significantly reduced its membership base and won hardly any parliamentary seats despite having ruled the country for 27 years. Under Kenneth Kaunda's one party system in Zambia, UNIP accumulated a lot of wealth. Through its company, Zambia National Holdings Limited, UNIP owned several properties. Some UNIP members accused Tilyenji Kaunda and other leaders of selling party assets.

Tilyenji is credited with his role in the formation of an opposition political alliance named the United Democratic Alliance. The Alliance was formed to challenge the ruling party at the 2006 general elections. Tilyenji served as chairman of the Alliance which during the 2006 elections floated UPND party President Hakainde Hichilema as the alliance candidate for president. At the 2008 Presidential by-elections, Tilyenji shifted his support from Hichilema to the candidate of the then-ruling party, Movement for Multi-party Democracy Party. During the 2011 Zambian presidential elections, Tilyenji contested elections for UNIP, but lost. He received 0.4% of the total votes cast during the elections.
