= United Progressive Party (Zambia) =

Zambian political party

The United Progressive Party (UPP) was a political party in Zambia. The current president of the party is Saviour Chishimba.

== History ==
The party was established by Simon Kapwepwe and several others who had left the ruling United National Independence Party (UNIP) in August 1971.

On 21 December of the same year Kapwepwe, taking advantage of a by-election, became an MP for the UPP. Kaunda reacted swiftly; on 4 February 1972, he made the specious accusation that Kapwepwe was an instrument of the White Rhodesian, South African and Portuguese governments; Kapwepwe and 122 of his followers were arrested and the UPP was banned. Before the end of the year a one-party state was proclaimed, and Kaunda felt sure enough of his power to free Kapwepwe on 31 December. Kapwepwe retired from politics and only appeared briefly in 1978, when he and Harry Nkumbula stood for Zambia's one-party presidential nomination against Kaunda. Both Nkumbula and Kapwepwe were outmaneuvered by Kaunda, who secured the nomination while the two of them disappeared from Zambia's political scene.
