= Hugh Mitchley =

British-Zambian lawyer and politician

Hugh Robert Emrys Mitchley QC MP (born 30 July 1925) was a lawyer and a Member of Parliament in the National Assembly of Northern Rhodesia from 1962-1964 and, following independence, in the National Assembly of Zambia from 1964-1973.

== Early life and education ==
Mitchley was born in India on 30 July 1925, the son of Margaret and George Ambrose Mitchley. His father had been a staff Captain in the Indian Army. Mitchley read law at Oxford. In 1944, he was a cadet in the Welsh Guards. He was promoted on 26th May 1944 to 2nd Lieutenant.

== Career ==
Mitchley was admitted to the Bar of England and Wales at the Middle Temple in 1949. In 1952, he emigrated to Northern Rhodesia. In 1961, Mitchley represented Northern Rhodesia at the African Conference on the Rule of Law in Lagos, Nigeria.

Mitchley was first elected to Parliament in October 1962 as an MP for Lusaka West for the United Federal Party, led by Sir Roy Welensky. He ran against Sidney Hutt, the candidate for the Liberal Party. In 1963, the United Federal Party changed its name to the National Progress Party. Mitchley attended the Northern Rhodesia Independence Conference in London in May 1964 as a representative of the National Progress Party (NPP).

The same year, he was made Queen's Counsel.

At the 1964 general elections, the National Progress Party and its 10 candidates won all 10 seats reserved for European settlers. This included, Mitchley who won a seat representing the Midlands. In October 1964, Northern Rhodesia gained its independence and became the country of Zambia, and Mitchley chose to renounce his English citizenship and acquire Zambian citizenship.

In 1967, Mitchley in his law practice represented two expats in a high profile case where they were accused by the government of being spies.

The National Progress Party disbanded before the 1968 elections, which were the first elections held after independence. Mitchley was the only former NPP candidate to run in the 1968 general elections. At the elections in 1968, the United National Independence Party won 81 seats, the African National Congress 23 and Mitchley, the sole independent, won the seat of Gwembe North. The seat had been a safe ANC seat, which Mitchley won by a 6000 vote majority. Mitchley ran with ANC support and the ANC leader even campaigned with him.

On 13 December 1972, however, President Kaunda signed a law making Zambia a one-party state. Opposition members of Parliament were given the option of joining the ruling United National Independence Party or sitting as "mere" representatives of their electorates until 31 December 1973. Mitchley was one of only three white MPs and the sole independent. He resigned on 13 December 1972, the day the law was passed.

== Personal life ==
Mitchley was a keen polo player.

== Works ==
- Mitchley, Hugh. Brief for the Plaintiff (New York) 1913.
- Mitchley, Hugh. Poems from the Zambian Bush.
