= Mwaiseni =

Mwaiseni (Bemba language: "welcome") is a mining company in Tanzania; it specializes in the mining of gemstones. Mwaiseni Stores Ltd. was a Zambian business. Henry Susman was the Managing Director.
