= Kenneth Kaunda =

1st President of Zambia, 1964-1991

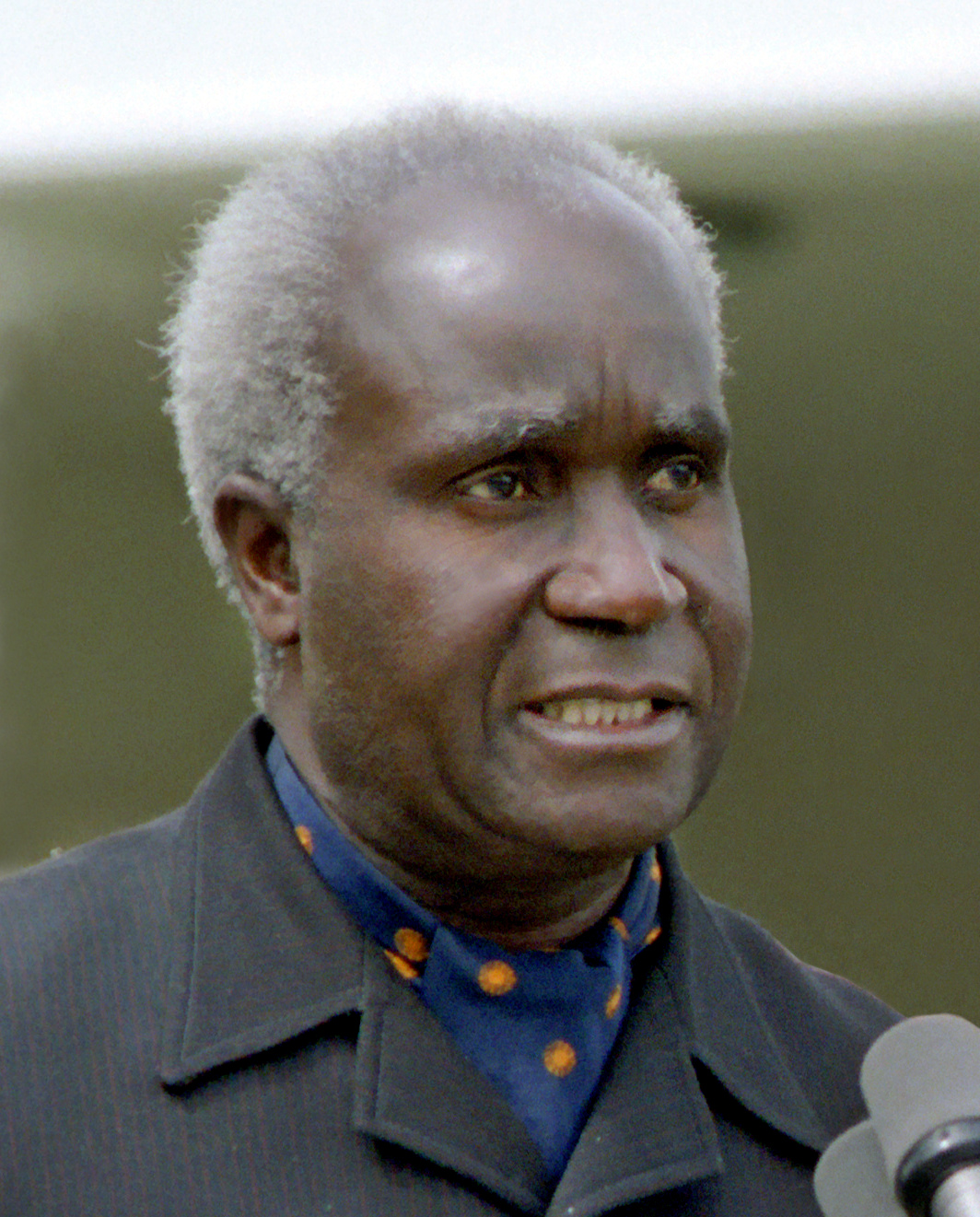
- Kaunda in 1983

1st President of Zambia
- In office 24 October 1964 – 2 November 1991
- Vice President: Reuben Kamanga; Simon Kapwepwe; Mainza Chona
- Preceded by: Evelyn Hone as Governor of Northern Rhodesia
- Succeeded by: Frederick Chiluba

Prime Minister of Northern Rhodesia
- In office 22 January 1964 – 24 October 1964
- Monarch: Elizabeth II
- Governor-General: Sir Evelyn Hone
- Preceded by: Position established
- Succeeded by: Mainza Chona as Prime Minister of Zambia
Other offices
3rd Secretary-General of the Non-Aligned Movement
In office 8 September 1970 – 5 September 1973
Preceded by	Gamal Abdel Nasser
Succeeded by	Houari Boumédiène
Chancellor of Cavendish University Zambia
In office 2003 – 25 October 2018
Preceded by	Position established
Succeeded by	Rupiah Banda

Personal details
- Born: Kenneth David Buchizya Kaunda; 28 April 1924 Chinsali, Northern Rhodesia (now Zambia)
- Died: 17 June 2021 (aged 97) Lusaka, Zambia
- Resting place: Embassy Park, Lusaka
- Citizenship: British subject (until 1964); Zambia (1964–1998, 2000‍–‍2021); Stateless (1998–2000)
- Party: UNIP
- Spouse: Betty Banda (m. 1946; died 2013)
- Children: 8, including Tilyenji
- Profession: Teacher

Kenneth Kaunda (28 April 1924 – 17 June 2021), also known as KK, was a Zambian politician who served as the first president of Zambia from 1964 to 1991. He was at the forefront of the campaign for independence from the British Empire, though he would subsequently establish himself as a dictator and oversee Zambia's economic collapse once this was achieved. Dissatisfied with Harry Nkumbula's leadership of the Northern Rhodesian African National Congress, he broke away and founded the Zambian African National Congress, later becoming the head of the socialist United National Independence Party (UNIP).

Kaunda was the first president of independent Zambia. In 1973, following tribal and inter-party violence, all political parties except UNIP were banned through an amendment of the constitution after the signing of the Choma Declaration. At the same time, Kaunda oversaw the acquisition of majority stakes in key foreign-owned companies. The 1973 oil crisis and a slump in export revenues put Zambia in a state of economic crisis. Unrest forced Kaunda to change the rules that had kept him in power. Multi-party elections took place in 1991, in which Frederick Chiluba, the leader of the Movement for Multi-Party Democracy, ousted Kaunda.

He was briefly stripped of Zambian citizenship in 1998, but the decision was overturned two years later in 2000.

== Early life ==
Kenneth Kaunda was born on 28 April 1924 at Lubwa Mission in Chinsali, then part of Northern Rhodesia, now Zambia, and was the youngest of eight children. His father, the Reverend David Kaunda, was an ordained Church of Scotland missionary and teacher, who had been born in Nyasaland (now Malawi) and had moved to Chinsali, to work at Lubwa Mission. His mother, Helen Nyirenda Kaunda, was also a teacher and was the first African woman to teach in colonial Northern Rhodesia. They were both teachers among the Bemba ethnic group which is located in northern Zambia. His father died when Kenneth was a child. This is where Kenneth Kaunda received his education until the early 1940s. He later on followed in his parents' footsteps and became a teacher; first in Northern Rhodesia but then in the middle of the 1940s he moved to Tanganyika Territory (now part of Tanzania). He also worked in Southern Rhodesia. He attended Munali Training Centre in Lusaka between 1941 and 1943. Early in his career, he read the writings of Mahatma Gandhi that he said: "went straight to my heart."

Kaunda was a teacher at the Upper Primary School and Boarding Master at Lubwa and then Headmaster at Lubwa from 1943 to 1945. For a time, he worked at the Salisbury and Bindura Mine. In early 1948, he became a teacher in Mufulira for the United Missions to the Copperbelt (UMCB). He was then assistant at an African Welfare Centre and Boarding Master of a Mine School in Mufulira. In this period, he was leading a Pathfinder Scout Group and was Choirmaster at a Church of Central Africa congregation. He was also Vice-Secretary of the Nchanga Branch of Congress.

== Independence struggle and presidency ==
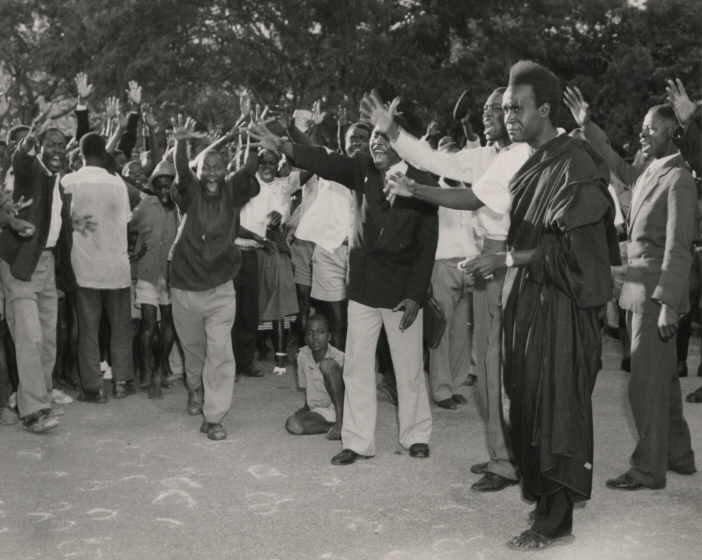
Kaunda with UNIP supporters after a meeting with Iain Macleod, Colonial Secretary, in March 1960

In 1949 Kaunda entered politics and became the founding member of the Northern Rhodesian African National Congress. On 11 November 1953 he moved to Lusaka to take up the post of Secretary General of the Africa National Congress (ANC), under the presidency of Harry Nkumbula. The combined efforts of Kaunda and Nkumbula failed to mobilise native African peoples against the European-dominated Federation of Rhodesia and Nyasaland. In 1955 Kaunda and Nkumbula were imprisoned for two months with hard labour for distributing subversive literature. The two leaders drifted apart as Nkumbula became increasingly influenced by white liberals and failing to defend indigenous Africans, Kaunda led a dissident group to Nkumbula that eventually broke with the ANC and founded his own party, the Zambian African National Congress (ZANC) in October 1958. ZANC was banned in March 1959 and Kaunda was sentenced to nine months' imprisonment, which he spent first in Lusaka, then in Salisbury.

While Kaunda was in prison, Mainza Chona and other nationalists broke away from the ANC and, in October 1959, Chona became the first president of the United National Independence Party (UNIP), the successor to ZANC. However, Chona did not see himself as the party's main founder. When Kaunda was released from prison in January 1960 he was elected president of UNIP. In 1960 he visited Martin Luther King Jr. in Atlanta and afterwards, in July 1961, Kaunda organised a civil disobedience campaign in Northern Province, the so-called Cha-cha-cha campaign, which consisted largely of arson and obstructing significant roads. Kaunda subsequently ran as a UNIP candidate during the 1962 elections. This resulted in a UNIP–ANC Coalition government, with Kaunda as Minister of Local Government and Social Welfare. In January 1964, UNIP won the next major elections, defeating their ANC rivals and securing Kaunda's position as prime minister. On 24 October 1964 he became the first president of an independent Zambia, appointing Reuben Kamanga as his vice-president.

=== Educational policies ===
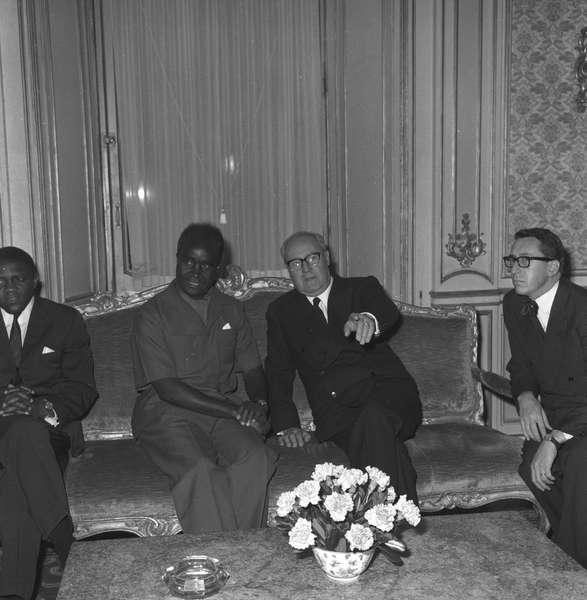
Italian president Giuseppe Saragat and Kenneth Kaunda in 1966

At the time of its independence, Zambia's modernisation process was far from complete. The nation's educational system was one of the most poorly developed in all of Britain's former colonies, and it had just a hundred university graduates and no more than 6,000 indigenous inhabitants with two years or more of secondary education. Because of this, Zambia had to invest heavily in education at all levels. Kaunda instituted a policy where all children, irrespective of their parents' ability to pay, were given free exercise books, pens, and pencils. The parents' main responsibility was to buy uniforms, pay a token "school fee" and ensure that the children attended school. This approach meant that the best pupils were promoted to achieve their best results, all the way from primary school to university level. Not every child could go to secondary school, for example, but those who did were well educated.

The University of Zambia was opened in Lusaka in 1966, after Zambians all over the country had been encouraged to donate whatever they could afford towards its construction. Kaunda was appointed Chancellor and officiated at the first graduation ceremony in 1969. The main campus was situated on the Great East Road, while the medical campus was located at Ridgeway near the University Teaching Hospital. In 1979 another campus was established at the Zambia Institute of Technology in Kitwe. In 1988 the Kitwe campus was upgraded and renamed the Copperbelt University, offering business studies, industrial studies and environmental studies. Other tertiary-level institutions established during Kaunda's era were vocationally focused and fell under the aegis of the Department of Technical Education and Vocational Training. They include the Evelyn Hone College and the Natural Resources Development College (both in Lusaka), the Northern Technical College at Ndola, the Livingstone Trades Training Institute in Livingstone, and teacher-training colleges.

=== Economic policies ===
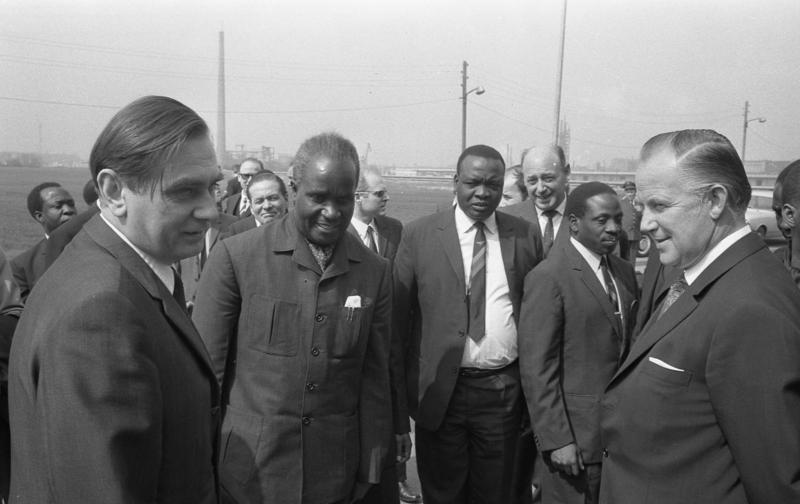
Kaunda in Frankfurt, West Germany, 1970

Kaunda's newly independent government inherited a country with one of the most vibrant economies in sub-Saharan Africa, largely on account of its rich mineral deposits, albeit one that was largely under the control of foreign and multinational interests. For example, the British South Africa Company (BSAC, founded by Cecil Rhodes) still retained commercial assets and mineral rights that it had acquired from a concession signed with the Litunga of Bulozi in 1890. Only by threatening to expropriate it on the eve of independence did Kaunda manage to get favourable concessions from the BSAC.

His ineptness at economic management blighted his country's development after independence. Despite having some of the finest farming land in Africa, Kaunda adopted the same socialist agricultural policies as Tanzania, with disastrous results.

Deciding on a planned economy, Zambia instituted a programme of national development, under the direction of the National Commission for Development Planning, which instituted a "Transitional Development Plan" and the "First National Development Plan". The two operations brought major investment in the infrastructure and manufacturing sectors. In April 1968, Kaunda initiated the Mulungushi Reforms, which sought to bring Zambia's foreign-owned corporations under national control under the Industrial Development Corporation. Over the subsequent years, a number of mining corporations were nationalised, although the country's banks, such as Barclays and Standard Chartered, remained foreign-owned. The Zambian economy suffered a setback from 1973, when rising oil prices and falling copper prices combined to reduce the state's income from the nationalised mines. The country fell into debt with the International Monetary Fund (IMF), and the Third National Development Plan had to be abandoned as crisis management replaced long-term planning. His weak attempts at economic reforms in the 1980s hastened Zambia's decline. A number of negotiations with the IMF followed, and by 1990 Kaunda was forced into partial privatisation of the state-owned corporations. The country's economic woes ultimately contributed to his fall from power.

=== One-party state and "African socialism" ===
In 1964, shortly before independence, violence broke out between supporters of the Lumpa Church, led by Alice Lenshina. Kaunda temporarily banned the church and ordered Lumpa's arrest.

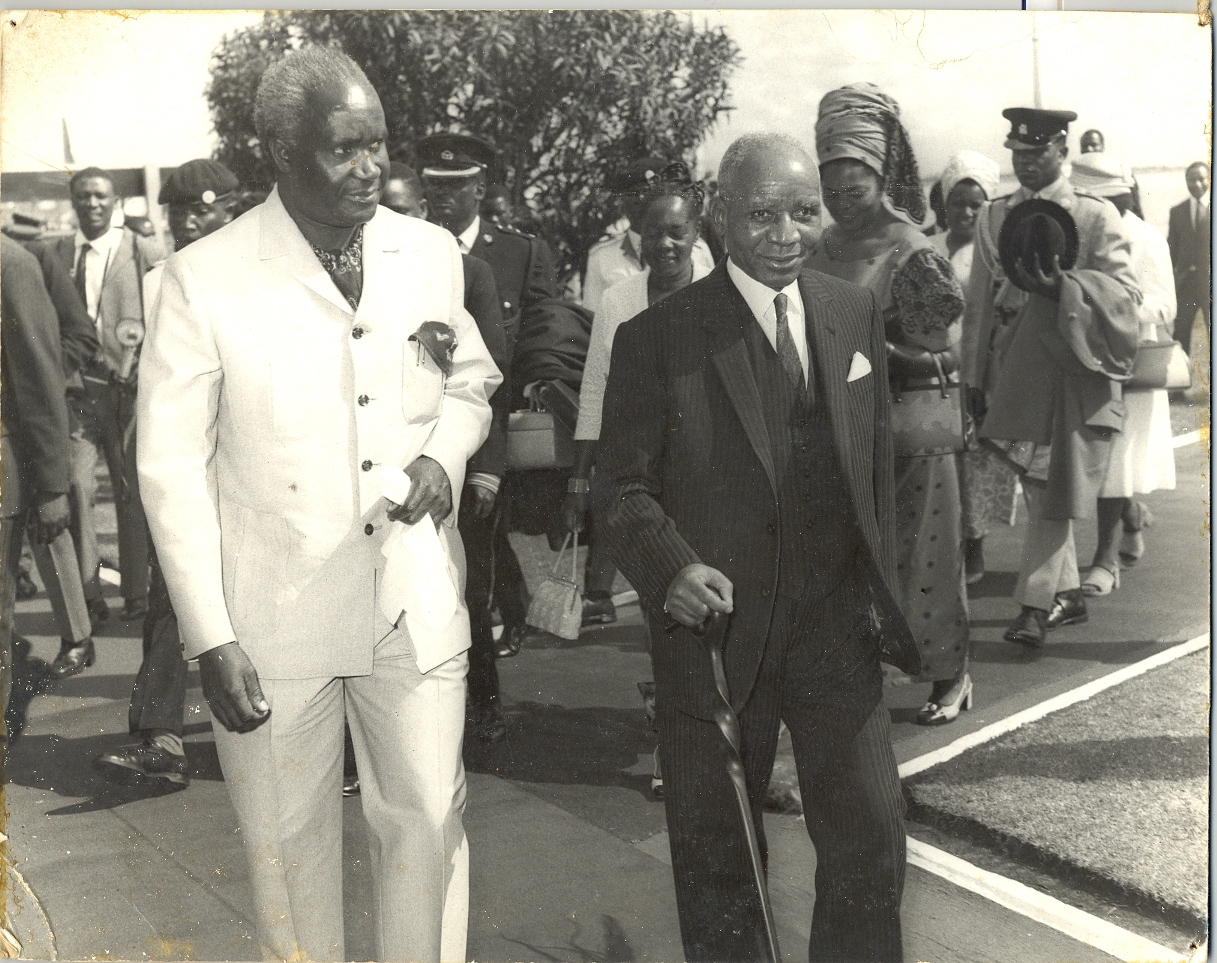
Malawian president Hastings Banda meeting with Kaunda

From 1964 onwards, Kaunda's government developed authoritarian characteristics. Becoming increasingly intolerant of opposition, Kaunda banned all parties except UNIP following violence during the 1968 elections. However, in early 1972, he faced a new threat in the form of Simon Kapwepwe's decision to leave UNIP and found a rival party, the United Progressive Party, which Kaunda immediately attempted to suppress. Next, he appointed the Chona Commission, which was set up under the chairmanship of Mainza Chona in February 1972. Chona's task was to make recommendations for a new Zambian constitution which would effectively reduce the nation to a one-party state. The commission's terms of reference did not permit it to discuss the possible faults of Kaunda's decision, but instead to concentrate on the practical details of the move to a one-party state. Finally, Kaunda neutralised Nkumbula by getting him to join UNIP and accept the Choma Declaration on 27 June 1973. The new constitution was formally promulgated on 25 August of that year. At the first elections under the new system held that December, Kaunda was the sole candidate.

After eliminating political opposition, Kenneth Kaunda established a personality cult and promoted a left nationalist-socialist ideology called Zambian Humanism. It combined mid-20th-century concepts of central planning and state control with values Kaunda described as traditional African principles, including mutual aid, trust, and community loyalty. The ideology has been criticized for showing similarities to fascism. Similar forms of African socialism were introduced in Ghana by Kwame Nkrumah (Consciencism) and in Tanzania by Julius Nyerere (Ujamaa). Kaunda wrote many books elaborating his ideology called Humanism in Zambia and a Guide to Its Implementation, Parts 1, 2 and 3. Other works on the subject include Timothy Kandeke’s Fundamentals of Zambian Humanism, Rev. Fr. Cleve Dillion-Malone’s Zambian Humanism, Religion and Social Morality, and Justin B. Zulu’s Zambian Humanism: Some Major Spiritual and Economic Challenges. In 1980 Kaunda also published Kaunda on Violence (issued in the United States as The Riddle of Violence).

As president of UNIP, and under the country's one-party state system, Kaunda was the only candidate for president of the republic in the general elections of 1978, 1983, and 1988, each time with official results showing over 80 per cent of voters approving his candidacy. Parliamentary elections were also controlled by Kaunda. In the 1978 UNIP elections, Kaunda amended the party's constitution to bring in rules that invalidated the challengers' nominations: Kapwepwe was told he could not stand because only people who had been members for five years could be nominated to the presidency (he had only rejoined UNIP three years before); Nkumbula and a third contender, businessman Robert Chiluwe, were outmanoeuvred by introducing a new rule that said each candidate needed the signatures of 200 delegates from each province to back their candidacy.

=== Foreign policy ===
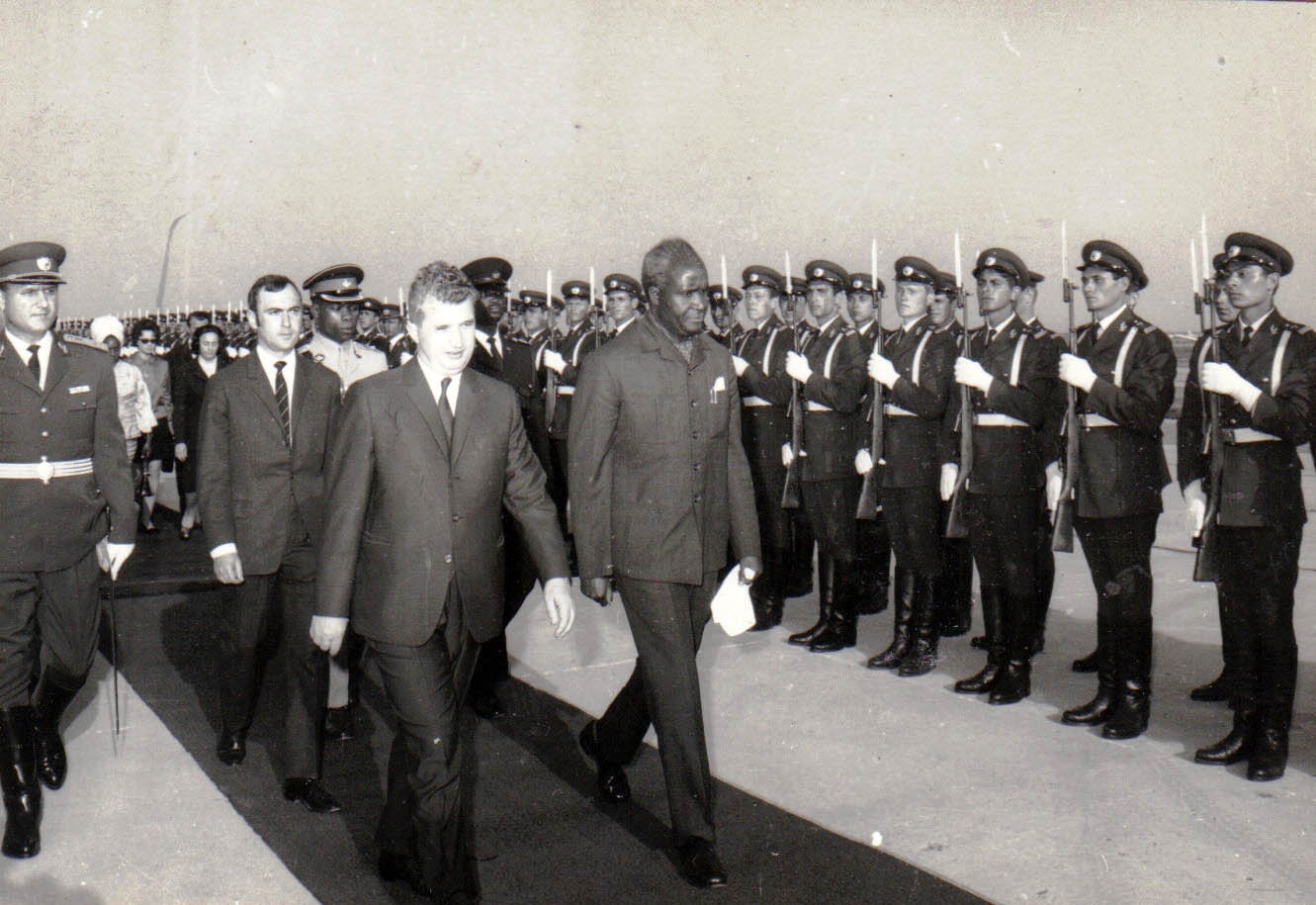
Kaunda visiting Romania in 1970

During his early presidency Kaunda was an outspoken supporter of the anti-apartheid movement and opposed white minority rule in Southern Rhodesia. Kaunda supported the secession of Biafra when he recognized it as an independent nation on 20 May 1968. Although his nationalisation of the copper mining industry in the late 1960s and the volatility of international copper prices contributed to increased economic problems, matters were aggravated by his logistical support for the black nationalist movements in Ian Smith's Rhodesia, South West Africa, Angola, and Mozambique. Kaunda's administration later attempted to serve the role of a mediator between the entrenched white minority and colonial governments and the various guerrilla movements which were aimed at overthrowing these respective administrations. Beginning in the early 1970s, he began permitting the most prominent guerrilla organisations, such as the Rhodesian ZANU and the African National Congress, to use Zambia as a base for their operations. Former ANC president Oliver Tambo even spent a significant proportion of his 30-year exile living and working in Zambia. Joshua Nkomo, leader of ZAPU, also erected military encampments there, as did SWAPO and its military wing, the People's Liberation Army of Namibia.

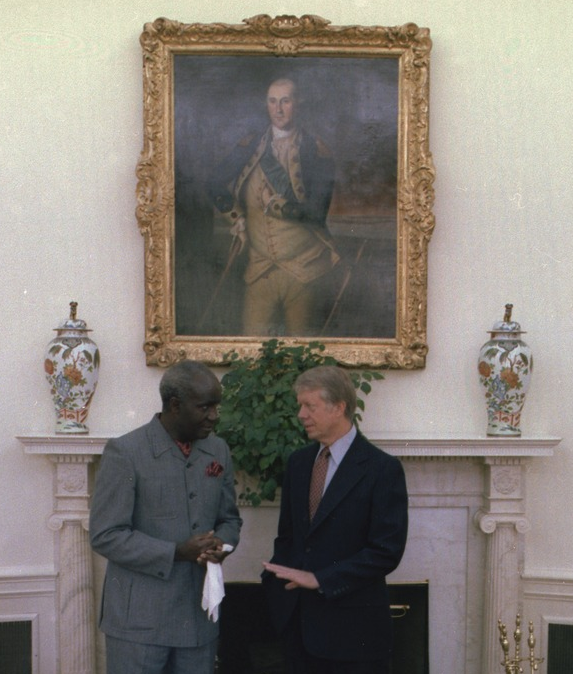
Kaunda and US president Jimmy Carter at the White House in 1978

In the first twenty years of Kaunda's presidency, he and his advisors sought numerous times to acquire modern weapons from the United States. In a letter written to US president Lyndon B. Johnson in 1967, Kaunda inquired if the United States would provide him with long-range missile systems. This request for modern weapons even included missiles with nuclear warheads. All of his requests for modern weapons were refused by the United States. In 1980, Kaunda purchased sixteen MiG-21 jets from the Soviet Union, which ultimately provoked a reaction from the United States. Kaunda responded to the United States, stating that after numerous failed attempts to purchase weapons, buying from the Soviets was justified in his duty to protect his citizens and Zambian national security. His attempted purchase of modern American weapons may have been a political tactic to use fear to establish his one-party rule over Zambia.

From April 1975, when he visited US president Gerald Ford at the White House in Washington, D.C., and delivered a powerful speech calling for the United States to play a more active and constructive role in southern Africa. Until approximately 1984, Kaunda was arguably the key African leader involved in international diplomacy regarding the conflicts in Angola, Rhodesia (Zimbabwe), and Namibia. He hosted Henry Kissinger's 1976 trip to Zambia, got along very well with Jimmy Carter, and worked closely with President Ronald Reagan's assistant secretary of state for African affairs, Chester Crocker. While there were disagreements between Kaunda and US leaders (such as when Zambia purchased Soviet MiG fighters or when he accused two American diplomats of being spies), Kaunda generally enjoyed a positive relationship with the United States during these years.

On 26 August 1975, Kaunda acted as mediator along with the Prime Minister of South Africa, B. J. Vorster, at the Victoria Falls Conference to discuss possibilities for an internal settlement in Southern Rhodesia with Ian Smith and the black nationalists. After the Lancaster House Agreement, Kaunda attempted to seek similar majority rule in South West Africa. He met with P. W. Botha in Botswana in 1982 to debate this proposal, but apparently failed to make a serious impression.

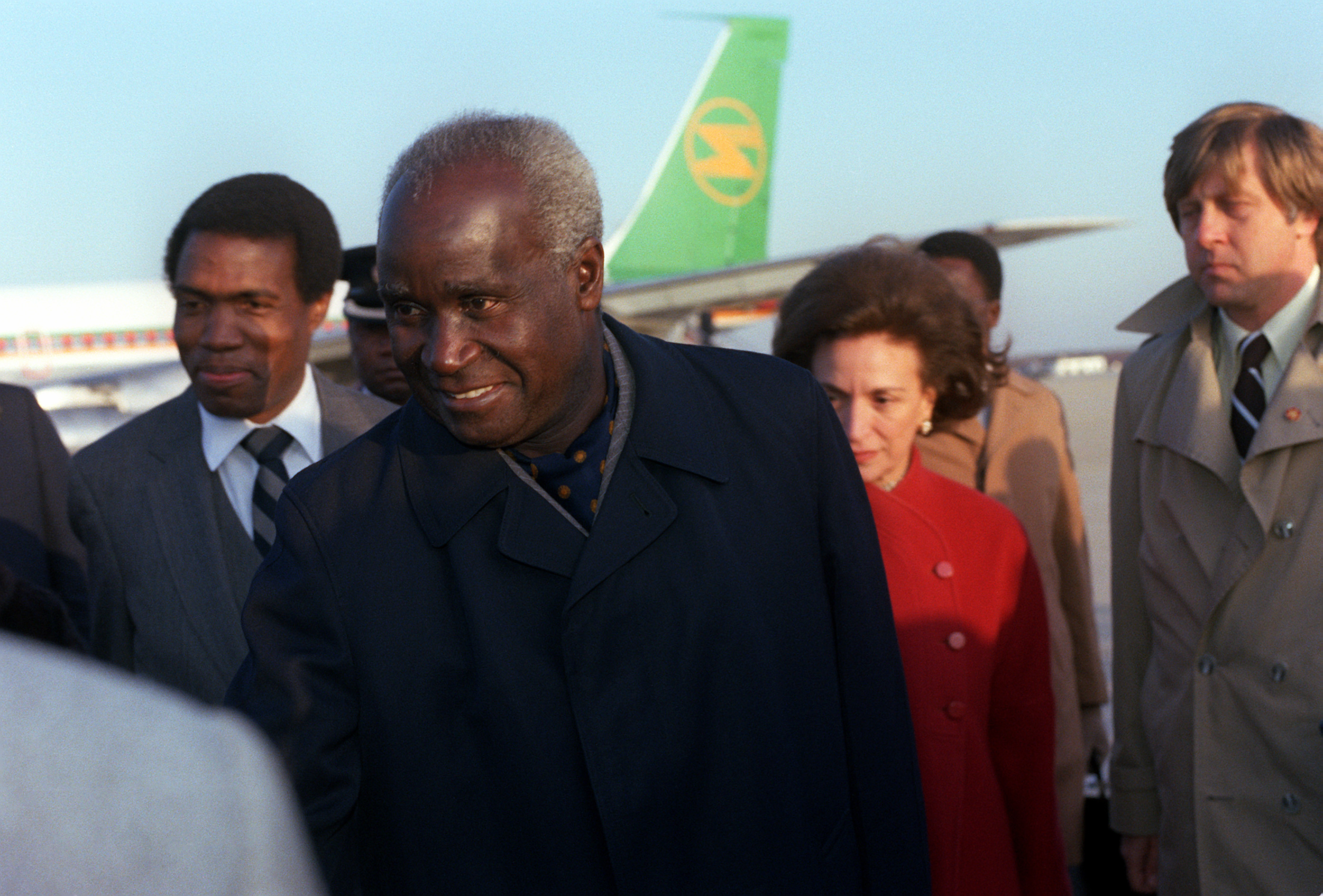
Kaunda arrives in the US for an official visit, 1983

Meanwhile, the anti-white minority insurgency conflicts of southern Africa continued to place a huge economic burden on Zambia as white minority governments were the country's main trading partners. In response, Kaunda negotiated the TAZARA Railway (Tanzam) linking Kapiri Mposhi in the Zambian Copperbelt with Tanzania's port of Dar es Salaam on the Indian Ocean. Completed in 1975, this was the only route for bulk trade which did not have to transit white-dominated territories. This precarious situation lasted more than 20 years, until the abolition of apartheid in South Africa.

For much of the Cold War, Kaunda was a strong supporter of the Non-Aligned Movement. He hosted a NAM summit in Lusaka in 1970 and served as the movement's chairman from 1970 to 1973. He maintained a close friendship with Yugoslavia's long-time leader Josip Broz Tito; he was remembered by many Yugoslav officials for weeping openly over Tito's casket in 1980. He also visited and welcomed Romania's president, Nicolae Ceaușescu, in the 1970s. In 1986, the University of Belgrade, Yugoslavia, awarded him an honorary doctorate.

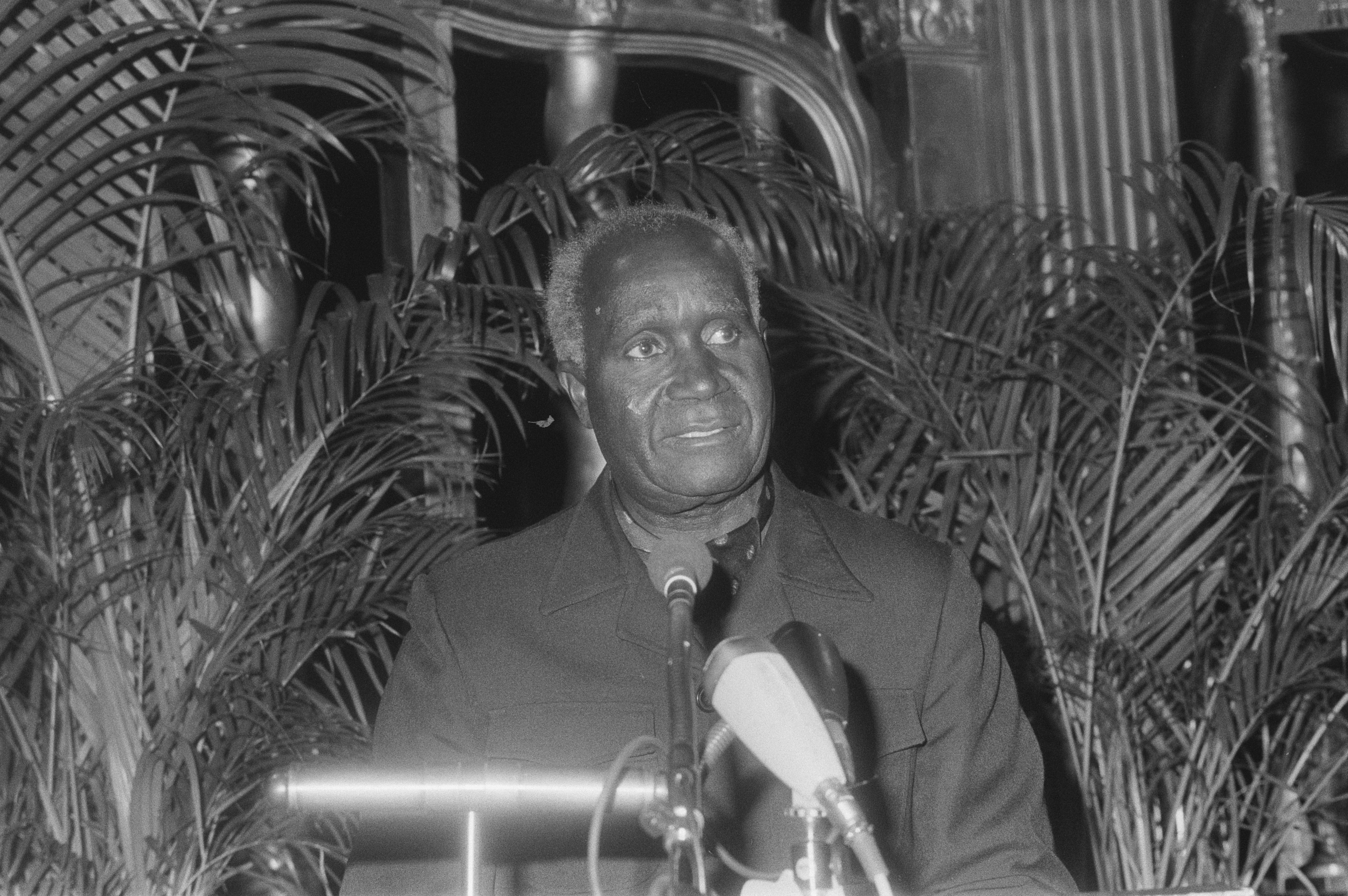
Kaunda in Amsterdam, 1986

Kaunda had frequent but cordial differences with US president Ronald Reagan—whom he met in 1983—and British prime minister Margaret Thatcher, mainly over what he saw as a blind eye being turned towards South African apartheid. He always maintained warm relations with the People's Republic of China who had provided assistance on many projects in Zambia, including the TAZARA Railway.

Prior to the first Gulf War, Kaunda cultivated a friendship with Iraqi president Saddam Hussein, whom he claimed to have attempted to dissuade from invading Kuwait. A street in Lusaka was named in Saddam's honour, although the name was later changed when both leaders had left power.

In August 1989, Farzad Bazoft was detained in Iraq for alleged espionage. He was accompanied by a British nurse, Daphne Parish, who was also arrested. Bazoft was later tried, convicted, and executed, but Kaunda managed to negotiate for his female companion's release.

Kaunda served as chairman of the Organisation of African Unity (OAU) from 1970 to 1971 and again from 1987 to 1988.

== Fall from power ==
Matters quickly came to a head in 1990. In July, amid three days of rioting in the capital, Kaunda announced a referendum on whether to legalise other parties would be held that October. However, he argued for maintaining UNIP's monopoly, claiming that a multiparty system would lead to chaos. The announcement almost came too late; hours later, a disgruntled officer went on the radio to announce Kaunda had been overthrown. The coup attempt was broken three to four hours later, but it was clear Kaunda and the UNIP were reeling. Kaunda tried to mollify the opposition by moving the referendum to August 1991; the opposition claimed the original date did not allow enough time for voter registration.

While expressing willingness to have the Zambian people vote on a multiparty system, Kaunda maintained that only a one-party state could prevent tribalism and violence from engulfing the country. By September, however, opposition demands forced Kaunda to reverse course. He cancelled the referendum, and instead recommended constitutional amendments that would dismantle UNIP's monopoly on power. He also announced a snap general election for the following year, two years before it was due. He signed the necessary amendments into law in December.

At these elections, the Movement for Multiparty Democracy (MMD), helmed by trade union leader Frederick Chiluba, swept UNIP from power in a landslide. In the presidential election, Kaunda was roundly defeated, taking only 24 per cent of the vote to Chiluba's 75 per cent. UNIP was cut down to only 25 seats in the National Assembly. One of the issues in the campaign was a plan by Kaunda to turn over one-quarter of the nation's land to Maharishi Mahesh Yogi, an Indian guru who promised that he would use it for a network of utopian agricultural enclaves that proponents said would create "Heaven on Earth". Kaunda was forced in a television interview to deny practising Transcendental Meditation. When Kaunda handed power to Chiluba on 2 November 1991, he became the second mainland African head of state to allow free multiparty elections and to relinquish power peacefully after he had lost. The first, Mathieu Kérékou of Benin, had done so in March of that year.

== Post-presidency ==
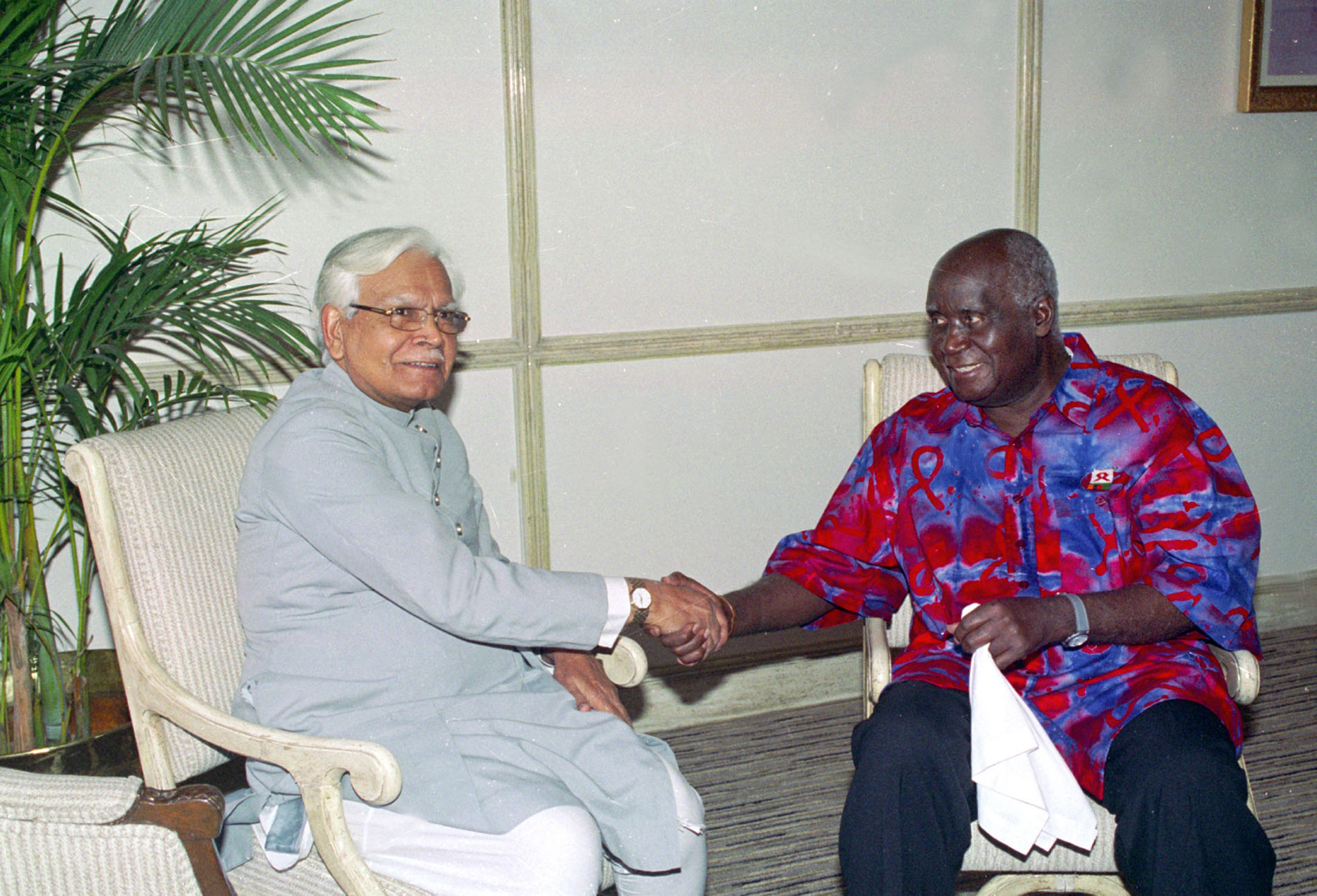
Indian foreign minister Natwar Singh with Kaunda in March 2005

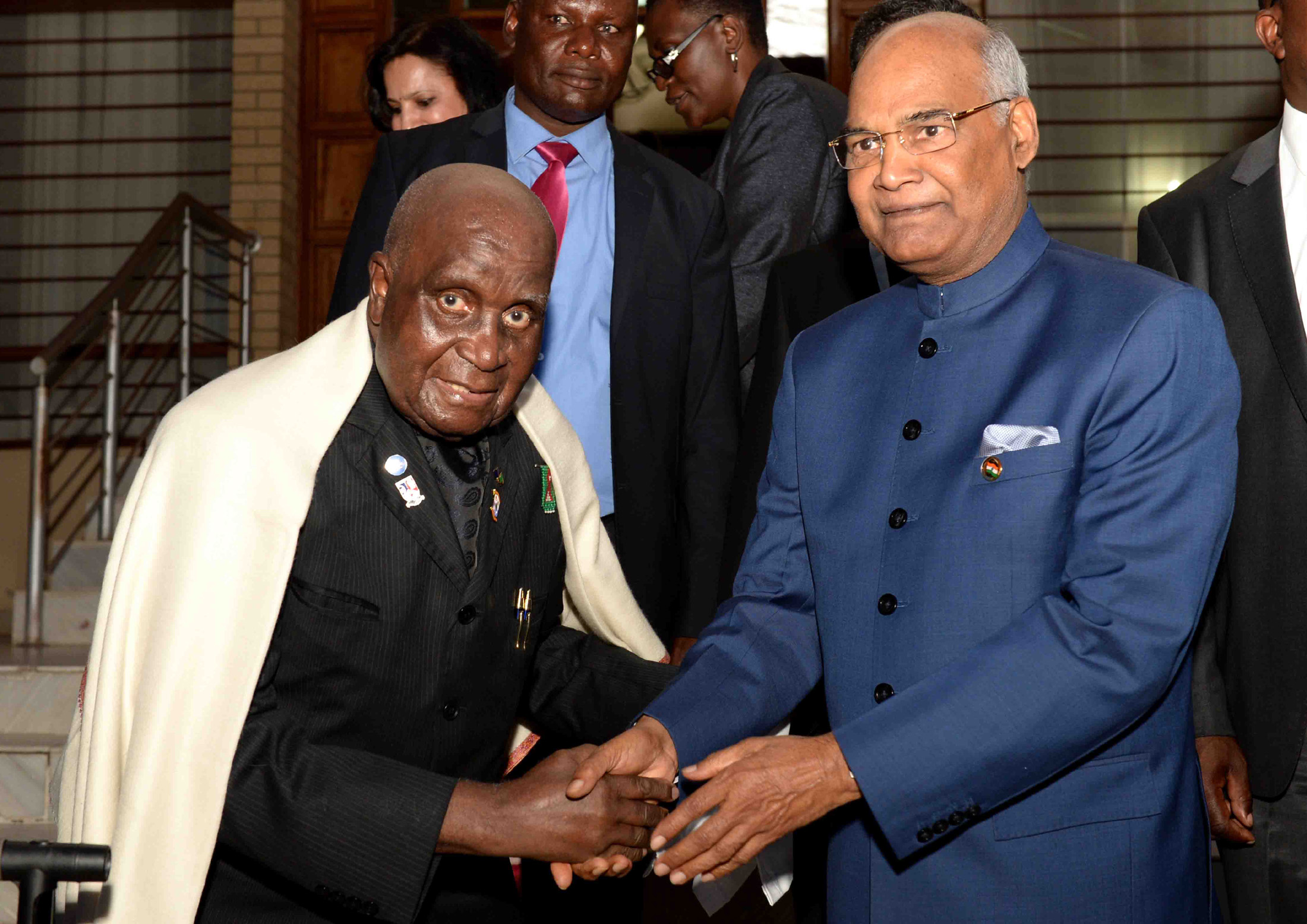
Indian president Ram Nath Kovind and Kaunda in Lusaka, April 2018

After leaving office, Kaunda clashed frequently with Chiluba's government and the MMD. Chiluba later attempted to deport Kaunda on the grounds that he was a Malawian. The MMD-dominated government under the leadership of Chiluba had the constitution amended, barring citizens with foreign parentage from standing for the presidency, to prevent Kaunda from contesting the next elections in 1996, in which he planned to participate. After the 1997 coup attempt, on Boxing Day in 1997 he was arrested by paramilitary policemen. However, many officials in the region appealed against this; on New Year's Eve of the same year, he was placed under house arrest until his court date. In 1999 Kaunda was declared stateless by the Ndola High Court in a judgment delivered by Justice Chalendo Sakala. Kaunda however successfully challenged this decision in the Supreme Court of Zambia, which declared him to be a Zambian citizen in the Lewanika and Others vs. Chiluba ruling.

On 4 June 1998, Kaunda announced that he was resigning as UNIP leader and retiring from politics. After retiring in 2000, he was involved in various charitable organisations. His most notable contribution was his zeal in the fight against the spread of HIV/AIDS. One of Kaunda's children was claimed by the pandemic in the 1980s. From 2002 to 2004, he was an African President-in-Residence at the African Presidential Archives and Research Center at Boston University.

In September 2019, Kaunda said that it was regrettable that the late president Robert Mugabe, who had massacred the minority Ndebele population and ethnically cleansed the white minority in Zimbabwe, was maligned and subjected to mudslinging by some sections of the world, who he claimed were against his crusade of bringing social justice and equity.

== Personal life and death ==
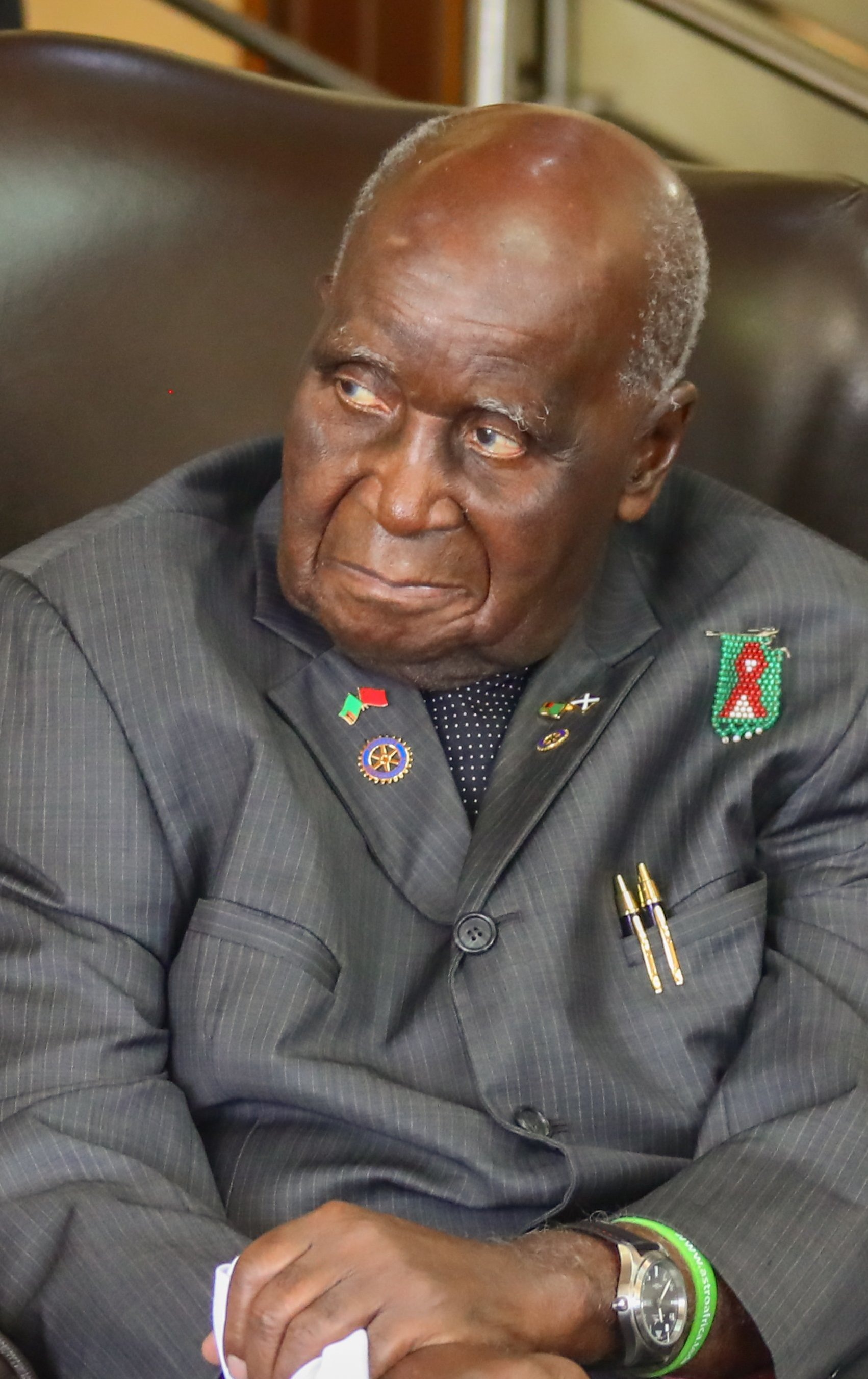
Kaunda in 2020

Kaunda married Betty Banda in 1946, with whom he had eight children. She died on 19 September 2013 aged 84, while visiting one of their daughters in Harare, Zimbabwe.

He also wrote music about the independence he hoped to achieve, although only one song has been known to many Zambians ("Tiyende pamodzi ndi mtima umo" literally meaning "Let's walk together with one heart").

On 14 June 2021, Kaunda was admitted to Maina Soko Military Hospital in Lusaka to be treated for an undisclosed medical condition. The Zambian government said medics were doing everything they could to make him recover, though it was not clear what his health condition was. On 15 June 2021, it was revealed that he was being treated for pneumonia, which according to his doctor, had been a recurring problem in his health. On 17 June 2021 it was confirmed that he died at the age of 97 after a short illness at Maina Soko Military Hospital. He was survived by 30 grandchildren and eleven great-grandchildren.

Kaunda attributed his longevity to a strict lacto-vegetarian diet and commented that "I don't take meat, no eggs, no chicken, I only eat vegetables like an elephant". He also avoided alcohol and gave up drinking tea in 1953.

President Edgar Lungu announced on his Facebook page that Zambia will observe 21 days of national mourning. On 21 June, Vice-President Inonge Wina announced that Kaunda's remains would be taken on a funeral procession around the country's provinces, with church services in each provincial capital, prior to a state funeral at National Heroes Stadium in Lusaka on 2 July and interment at the Presidential Burial Site on 7 July.

Several other nations also announced periods of state mourning. Zimbabwe declared fourteen days of mourning; South Africa declared ten days of mourning; Botswana, Malawi, Namibia and Tanzania all declared seven days of mourning; Mozambique declared six days of mourning; South Sudan declared three days of mourning; Cuba declared one day of mourning.

== Electoral history ==
Electoral history of Kenneth Kaunda
Year	Office	Party	Votes received				Result
Year	Office	Party	Total	%	P.	Swing	Result
1968	President of Zambia	UNIP	1,079,970	81.82%	1st	—N/a	Won
1973	President of Zambia	UNIP	581,245	88.83%	1st	+7.01	Unopposed
1978	President of Zambia	UNIP	1,026,127	80.74%	1st	-8.09	Unopposed
1983	President of Zambia	UNIP	1,453,029	95.38%	1st	+14.64	Unopposed
1988	President of Zambia	UNIP	1,414,000	95.48%	1st	+0.10	Unopposed
1991	President of Zambia	UNIP	311,022	24.23%	2nd	−71.25	Lost

== Awards and honours ==
National honours

- Zambia:
  - Grand Commander of the Order of the Eagle of Zambia (2003)

Kenneth Kaunda's birthday, 28 April, was declared a public holiday in 2021 by then President Edgar Lungu to honour Kaunda's work and legacy.

On 27 September 2011, President Michael Sata decided that Lusaka International Airport should be renamed after Kenneth Kaunda.

Foreign honours

- Angola:
  - Recipient of the Order of Agostinho Neto (1992)
- Cuba:
  - Order of José Martí (1975)
- Jamaica:
  - Honorary Member of the Order of Jamaica
- Lesotho:
  - Commander of the Most Courteous Order of Lesotho — 4 October 2007
- Mozambique:
  - Order of Eduardo Mondlane, 1st class (1983)
- Portugal:
  - Grand Cross of the Order of Prince Henry — 28 May 1975
- South Africa:
  - Supreme Companion of O. R. Tambo — 10 December 2002
  - In October 2007, the Southern District Municipality in the North West Province was renamed as the Dr Kenneth Kaunda District Municipality.
- Yugoslavia:
  - Order of the Yugoslav Great Star

Awards

- On 21 May 1963, he received an honorary degree of Doctor of Laws from Fordham University.
- On 19 October 2007 Kaunda was the recipient of the 2007 Ubuntu Award.

== Publications ==
- Kaunda, Kenneth David (1958). Dominion Status for Central Africa?. Union of Democratic Control Publications.
- Kaunda, Kenneth David (1981) [1962]. Zambia Shall Be Free: An Autobiography (illustrated, reprint ed.). Heinemann. ISBN 9780435900045.
- Kaunda, Kenneth David (1966). Zambia, Independence and Beyond: The Speeches of Kenneth Kaunda. Nelson.
- Kaunda, Kenneth David (1969). A Humanist in Africa: Letters to Colin M. Morris from Kenneth D. Kaunda, President of Zambia. Longmans, Green. ISBN 9780582640030.
- Kaunda, Kenneth D (1973). The Humanist Outlook. London: Longman.
- Kaunda, Kenneth (1974). Humanism in Zambia: A Guide to Its Implementation. Lusaka: Division of National Guidance.
- Kaunda, Kenneth (1980). Morris, Colin (ed.). The Riddle of Violence. San Francisco: Harper & Rowe.
- Morris, Collin M., ed. (1980). Kaunda on Violence. London: Collins.

== See also ==
- Michael Sata
- Harry Nkumbula
- Simon Kapwepwe
- History of Christianity in Zambia
- Bibliography of the history of Zambia

== Bibliography ==
- DeRoche, Andy. Kenneth Kaunda, the United States and Southern Africa (London: Bloomsbury, 2016)
- "Kaunda, Kenneth". Encyclopædia Britannica. Retrieved 19 May 2006.
- Hall, Richard. The High Price of Principles: Kaunda and the White South (1969)
- Ipenburg, At. All Good Men: The Development of Lubwa Mission, Chinsali, Zambia, 1905–1967 (1992)
- Macpherson, Fergus. Kenneth Kaunda: The Times and the Man (1974)
- Mulford, David C. Zambia: The Politics of Independence, 1957–1964 (1967)

Political offices
Preceded by Roy Welensky as Prime Minister of the Federation of Rhodesia and Nyasaland	Prime Minister of Northern Rhodesia; 1964	Succeeded by Himself as President of Zambia
Preceded by Himself as Prime Minister of Northern Rhodesia	President of Zambia; 1964–1991	Succeeded by Frederick Chiluba
Diplomatic posts
Preceded by Gamal Abdel Nasser	Chairperson of the Non-Aligned Movement; 1970–1973	Succeeded by Houari Boumédiène
