= Zambian African National Congress =

Zambian political party

- Founded: July 1948 (as the Northern Rhodesia Congress)
- Banned: 1973
- Ideology: Zambian independence; Zambian nationalism
- International affiliation: African National Congress (South Africa)

The Zambian African National Congress was a political party in Zambia. It was established as the Northern Rhodesia Congress, which was the first nationalist political organization in Northern Rhodesia.

== History ==
The Northern Rhodesia Congress (NRC), also known as the Northern Rhodesia African Congress (NRAC), was formed in July 1948, at the second congress of the Northern Rhodesia Federation of Welfare Societies. Godwin Lewanika, a Barotseland native from an aristocratic background, became the first president. It was the first African political party in the country. NRC had its roots in the Federation of Welfare Societies, active between 1940 and 1946. In 1951 the party adopted the name Northern Rhodesian African National Congress (NRANC) under the presidency of Harry Nkumbula, and was linked to the African National Congress in South Africa. In 1953 Kenneth Kaunda became the general secretary of the organization.

The NRANC was the leading force of Northern Rhodesian nationalism in the 1950s. It opposed federation, and boycotted shops where the colour bar was implemented. In 1955 Nkumbula was imprisoned for possessing banned literature. In 1957 he visited London, gaining some support from the British Labour Party.

In 1958 the party was divided on whether to participate in the 1959 Northern Rhodesian general election, in which only a minority of the black population was allowed to vote. The more radical Kaunda broke away, and formed the Zambia African National Congress, which was banned in 1959. The NRANC won a single seat in the elections. In the 1962 general elections the party won seven seats, becoming the third-largest faction in the Legislative Assembly and held the balance of power. Prior to the elections Nkumbula had made a secret electoral pact with the United Federal Party, but decided to form a government with the United National Independence Party.

The party won ten seats in the 1964 general elections, and following independence, was renamed the Zambian African National Congress. Nkumbula ran for president in the 1968 general elections, finishing second to Kaunda with 18% of the vote. The party won 23 of the 110 seats in the National Assembly, remaining the main opposition party.

In 1973 the party was banned, as the country became a one-party state.
