= Reuben Kamanga =

Zambian politician

Reuben Chitandika Kamanga

1st Vice-President of Zambia
- In office 24 October 1964 – October 1967
- President: Kenneth Kaunda
- Preceded by: Position created
- Succeeded by: Simon Kapwepwe

Personal details
- Born: Reuben Chitandika Kamanga; 26 August 1929 Chitandika Village, Chipata district, Northern Rhodesia
- Died: 20 September 1996 (aged 67) Makeni home, Lusaka, Zambia
- Spouse: Edna Mwansa Kabungo
- Children: 7
- Occupation: Politician

Reuben Chitandika Kamanga (26 August 1929 – 20 September 1996) was a Zambian freedom fighter, politician and statesman. He was educated at Munali Secondary School.

== Early and family Life ==
Kamanga was born on 26 August in 1929 in Chipata district of the Eastern Zambia at Chitandika village of chief Chinunda.

== Political career ==
Kamanga was imprisoned several times during the independence struggle especially during the period 1959–60. In 1958 Kamanga along with other senior males from the Eastern Province joined the United National Independence party (UNIP). He later went to live in Cairo from 1960–62. Before Zambia's independence he served as the deputy president of the United National Independence Party and as Minister of Labour and Mines.

Following the attainment of independence on 24 October 1964, Kamanga was appointed and became Zambia's first Vice-President under President Kenneth Kaunda. As the country's first Vice President, Kamanga served for three years before Kenneth Kaunda changed him to serve in a different cabinet post. Thus, he was posted to Minister of Foreign Affairs in 1967, and then became Minister of Rural Development in 1969. He served in the Ministry of Agriculture as well. In 1983 Kamanga was appointed to the Central Committee in charge of Rural Development. RCK also served as Member of the Central Committee in charge of Legal & Political Affairs, before his retirement in 1990.

== Retirement from politics and death ==
He retired from politics in 1991 before the political defeat of UNIP to the Movement for Multiparty Democracy (MMD). He left/retired with a few other colleagues who opted not to fight. Kamanga later died on 20 September at his Makeni home in 1996. In October 2014, the extended Kamanga family wrote a letter to the Zambian Government asking them to rename the Chipata District hospital after Ruben Kamanga, saying that he deserves to have something in his name for how influential he was during the fight for independence.

Political offices
Preceded by Office created	Vice-President of Zambia; 1964–1967	Succeeded by Simon Kapwepwe
