= Order of the Eagle of Zambia =

- Type: Four-grade order
- Presented by: Zambia
- Established: August 23, 1965
- Ribbon of the Order

The Order of the Eagle of Zambia is the highest civil decoration of Zambia. Founded on 23 October 1965, it consists of four grades: Grand Commander (GCEZ), Grand Officer (GOEZ) Officer (OEZ) and Member (MEZ).
