= Harry Nkumbula =

Zambian politician (1916–1983)

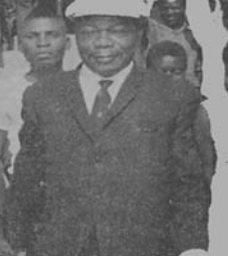

Minister of African Education
- In office 1962–1964
- Preceded by: Edson Mwamba
- Succeeded by: John Mwanakatwe

Member of the Legislative Council for South-Western
- In office 1959–1964
- Preceded by: Ebden Carlisle
- Succeeded by: Seat abolished

Member of the National Assembly for Monze
- In office 1964–1968
- Preceded by: Seat created
- Succeeded by: Bennie Hamwemba

Member of the National Assembly for Monze West
- In office 1968–1978
- Preceded by: Seat created
- Succeeded by: Rex Natala

Personal details
- Born: 15 January 1916 Maala, Northern Rhodesia
- Died: 8 October 1983 (aged 67)
- Party: ZANC (1950–1973); UNIP (1973–1978)
- Profession: Teacher, trade unionist, businessman, farmer

Harry Mwaanga Nkumbula (15 January 1916 – 8 October 1983) was a Zambian nationalist leader involved in the movement for the independence of Northern Rhodesia, as Zambia was known until the end of British rule in 1964. He was born in the village of Maala in the Namwala district of Zambia's southern province. He was the youngest of three children and the only son.

== Educational background ==
Nkumbula received his early formal education at Methodist mission schools and in 1934 completed Standard VI at the Kafue Training Institute. He then taught in Namwala District for several years.

In 1938 Nkumbula joined the Northern Rhodesian government's teaching service and later worked in Kitwe and Mufulira on the Copperbelt. During World War II he became involved in African nationalist politics, like many other educated Africans of the day. For example, he held the position of Secretary of the Mufulira Welfare Association and co-founded the Kitwe African Society.

In 1946, from Chalimbana Teacher Training School, Nkumbula went to Kampala's Makerere University College in Uganda. This was made possible by the support of Sir Stewart Gore-Browne, a pro-black British settler politician. From Makerere, Nkumbula went on to study for and received a diploma from the Institute of Education, University of London. In London, Nkumbula had the opportunity to meet other African nationalists who were galvanized after attending the 1945 Pan-African Congress in Manchester, England. In 1949 he worked with Nyasaland's Hastings Kamuzu Banda in drafting a document that expressed African opposition to the proposed white-dominated Central African Federation. This collaboration prepared the two men for their subsequent struggles with the colonialists in their home countries. After his diploma, Nkumbula enrolled to study economics at the London School of Economics but he failed his examinations and returned to Northern Rhodesia without a degree early in 1950.

== Independence struggle ==
As a militant, articulate and uncompromising opponent of the Federation, Nkumbula was elected president of the Northern Rhodesian African Congress in 1951. The party was soon renamed the African National Congress (ANC). In 1953, Kenneth Kaunda became secretary general of the ANC. When Nkumbula called a national strike disguised as a "national day of prayer" in opposition to the Federation, the African population did not respond. This was due to the opposition of the president of the African Mineworkers' Union, Lawrence Katilungu, who campaigned against the strike on the Copperbelt. In October 1953, the white colonial settlers formed the Federation of Rhodesia and Nyasaland, ignoring the black African majority's opposition. In the early months of 1954, Nkumbula and Kaunda organised a partially successful boycott of European-owned butcheries in Lusaka. However, Nkumbula, Kaunda, and the ANC found it difficult to mobilize their people against the Federation.

In early 1955 Nkumbula and Kaunda were imprisoned together for two months (with hard labour) for distributing "subversive" literature. Such imprisonment and other forms of harassment were normal rites of passage for African nationalist leaders. The experience of imprisonment had a moderating influence on Nkumbula, but it had a radicalizing influence on Kaunda. Nkumbula became increasingly influenced by white liberals and was seen as willing to compromise on the fundamental issue of majority rule.

Opposition to Nkumbula's allegedly autocratic leadership of the ANC eventually resulted in a split with Kaunda, who went on to form the Zambian African National Congress (ZANC) in October 1958. ZANC was banned in March 1959 and in June Kaunda was sentenced to nine months imprisonment. While Kaunda was still in prison, the United National Independence Party (UNIP) was formed late in 1959. Once he came out of prison, Kaunda took over the presidency of UNIP, which became better organized and more militant than Nkumbula's ANC. Due to this, UNIP rapidly took the leading position in the struggle for independence, eclipsing the ANC.

During independence constitutional talks in London in 1960–61, Nkumbula played only a secondary role. He suffered a further setback when he disappeared from the political scene for nine months (April 1961 – January 1962), while serving a prison sentence for causing death by dangerous driving. In the run-up to elections in October 1962, Nkumbula made the mistake of accepting funding from Moise Tshombe's regime in Katanga. He also made an ill-advised secret electoral pact with the white-dominated United Federal Party (UFP). He then found himself in a bind after the ANC won seven seats and held the balance of power between UNIP and the UFP. Eventually Nkumbula chose to form a coalition with UNIP and was given the post of minister of African education. The UNIP/ANC alliance lasted until the pre-independence elections of January 1964, when UNIP won fifty-five seats to the ANC's ten seats. Nkumbula became leader of the opposition.

== After independence ==
During the last days of the Federation, the ANC had been largely confined to Nkumbula's regional base in the southern province. Although the party won seats in Western Province during the general elections of 1968, Nkumbula had little to offer the Zambian public. When Kaunda moved to convert Zambia into a one-party state, Nkumbula capitulated. He signed a document called the Choma Declaration on 27 June 1973 and announced that he was joining UNIP. The ANC ceased to exist after the dissolution of parliament in October 1973. Some have alleged that Kaunda "bought off" Nkumbula by offering him an emerald mine. However, the fact that the emerald mine did not enter his possession until 1975 casts doubt on this allegation. Nkumbula's last prominent political action was an ill-fated attempt, together with Simon Kapwepwe, to stand against Kaunda for Zambia's one-party presidential nomination in 1978. Both Nkumbula and Kapwepwe were outmaneuvered by Kaunda, who secured the nomination while the two of them disappeared from Zambia's political scene.

Nkumbula died on 8 October 1983, aged 67.

His son Baldwin Nkumbula was also a politician. He was widely tipped to become the next president of Zambia until his death in a road accident.
