= United National Independence Party =

Political party in Zambia

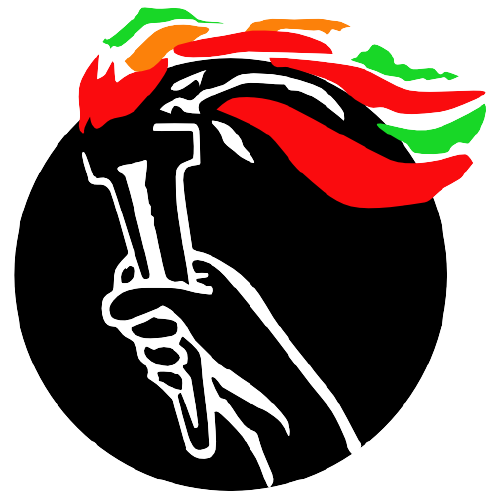
- Abbreviation: UNIP
- Leader: Trevor Mwamba
- Founder: Mainza Chona
- Founded: October 1959
- Preceded by: Zambian African National Congress
- Headquarters: Lusaka
- Ideology: Zambian Humanism; African nationalism African socialism Christian socialism Christian left
- Political position: Left-wing
- National Assembly: 0 / 157 (0%)
- Pan African Parliament: 0 / 5 (0%)

Party flag
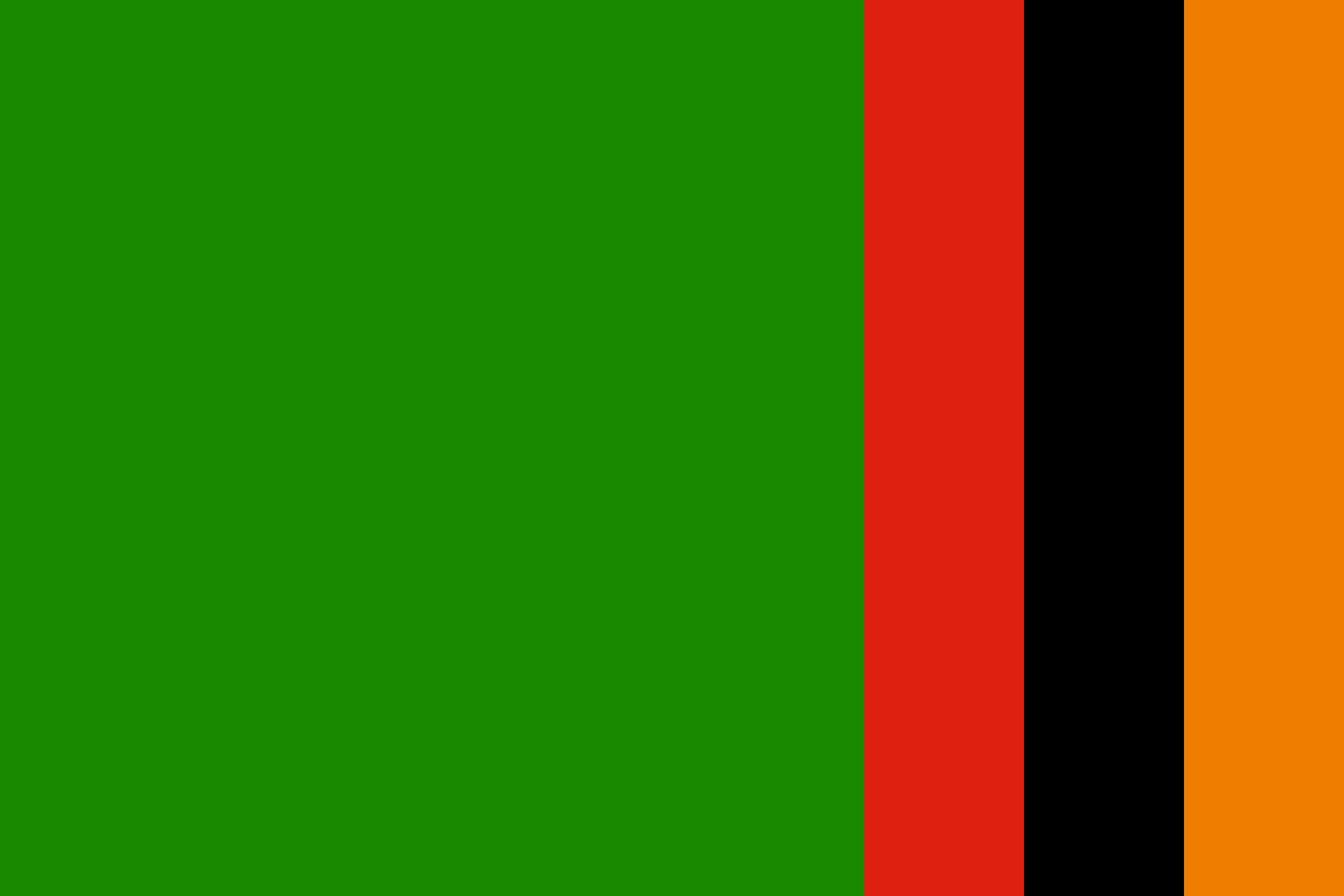

Website
- unipzambia.org

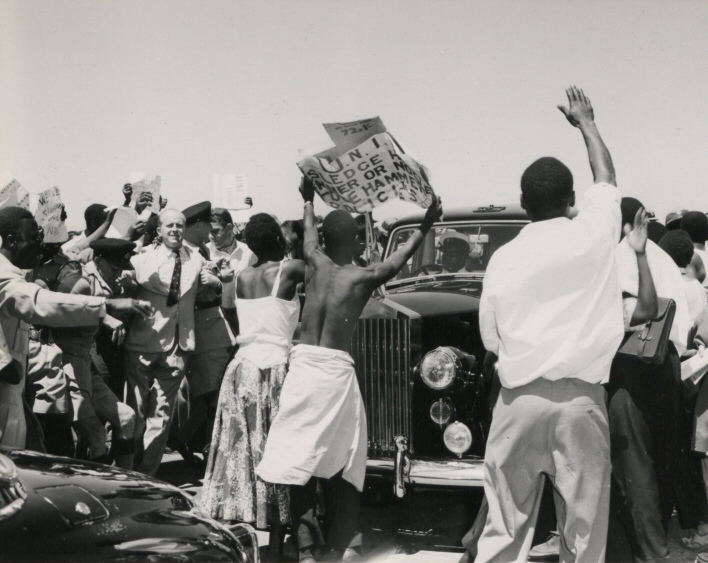
Demonstrations by the United National Independence Party (UNIP) during the visit of Iain Macleod (1960)

The United National Independence Party (UNIP) is a political party in Zambia. It governed the country from 1964 to 1991 under the socialist presidency of Kenneth Kaunda, and was the sole legal party in the country between 1973 and 1990. On 4 April 2021, Bishop Trevor Mwamba was elected President of UNIP.

== History ==
UNIP was founded in October 1959 by Mainza Chona as a successor of the Zambian African National Congress (ZANC), banned earlier that year. UNIP was initially led by Chona as the ZANC leader, Kaunda, had been imprisoned. Kaunda later assumed power as leader of UNIP after he was released from prison in 1960.

In the general elections, UNIP won 14 seats, in second position, the first being taken by United Federal Party (UFP). Although Northern Rhodesian African National Congress leader Harry Nkumbula had made a secret electoral pact with the UFP, he later opted to form a government with UNIP. After a convincing victory in the Northern Rhodesian general elections in 1964, when UNIP won 55 of the 75 seats, Kaunda became Prime Minister of Northern Rhodesia, leading the country to independence on 24 October 1964, when he became president.

In the 1968 general elections, Kaunda was re-elected president with 82% of the vote, and UNIP won 81 of the 105 elected seats in the National Assembly.

In 1973, the country became a one-party state with UNIP as the sole legal party, with an amended constitution being promulgated on 25 August 1973. The general election that year described as the final steps in achieving what was called a "one-party participatory democracy". National policy was formulated by the Central Committee of UNIP. According to the constitution, UNIP's president was selected at the party's general conference, and the second-ranking person in the Zambian hierarchy was UNIP's secretary general. The constitution also stipulated that UNIP's president was the sole candidate for president of the republic; he was confirmed in office every five years via a yes/no referendum. Voters chose between multiple UNIP candidates for the 125 parliamentary seats, with three candidates running in each constituency. Kaunda was confirmed as president with 89% of the vote. Elections were held under the same system in 1978, 1983 and 1988, with Kaunda receiving at least 80% of the vote each time.

At the end of 1990, multi-party democracy was reintroduced, and UNIP was roundly defeated in the 1991 general elections by the Movement for Multi-Party Democracy (MMD); Kaunda was defeated in the presidential vote by MMD candidate Frederick Chiluba, receiving just 24% of the vote, whilst in the National Assembly elections UNIP won 25 seats to the MMD's 125.

Following changes to the constitution which effectively barred Kaunda from running for president again, UNIP boycotted the 1996 elections, although two members contested National Assembly seats. The party returned to contest the 2001 elections with Kenneth Kaunda's son, Tilyenji, as its presidential candidate; he received 10% of the vote, finishing fourth out of the eleven candidates. In the National Assembly elections, the party won 13 seats.

Prior to the 2006 elections, the party joined the United Democratic Alliance alongside the other two largest opposition parties. United Party for National Development leader, Hakainde Hichilema, was the alliance's presidential candidate, finishing third. The alliance won just 26 seats in the National Assembly, down from the 74 the three parties had won in 2001.

UNIP did not contest the 2008 presidential by-election, but nominated Tilyenji Kaunda as its presidential candidate for the 2011 elections. Kaunda received less than 1% of the vote, finishing sixth in a field of ten candidates. The party also failed to win a seat in the National Assembly, receiving only 0.7% of the vote. Kaunda ran in the 2015 presidential by-election, but again received less than 1% of the vote. Tilyenji Kaunda remained the party's presidential candidate for the 2016 general elections, but he received only 0.24% of the vote, with the party again failing to win a seat in the National Assembly.

== Electoral history ==
=== Presidential elections ===
| Election | Party candidate | Votes | % | Result |
|---|---|---|---|---|
| 1968 | Kenneth Kaunda | 1,079,970 | 81.8% | Elected ✓ |
| 1973 | Kenneth Kaunda | 581,245 | 88.8% | Elected ✓ |
| 1978 | Kenneth Kaunda | 1,026,127 | 80.7% | Elected ✓ |
| 1983 | Kenneth Kaunda | 1,453,029 | 95.4% | Elected ✓ |
| 1988 | Kenneth Kaunda | 1,414,000 | 95.5% | Elected ✓ |
| 1991 | Kenneth Kaunda | 311,022 | 24.24% | Lost ✗ |
| 2001 | Tilyenji Kaunda | 175,898 | 10.12% | Lost ✗ |
| 2006 | Supported Hakainde Hichilema (UDA) | 693,772 | 25.32% | Lost ✗ |
| 2011 | Tilyenji Kaunda | 9,950 | 0.36% | Lost ✗ |
| 2015 | Tilyenji Kaunda | 9,737 | 0.58% | Lost ✗ |
| 2016 | Tilyenji Kaunda | 8,928 | 0.24% | Lost ✗ |
| 2021 | Trevor Mwamba | 3,036 | 0.06% | Lost ✗ |

=== National Assembly elections ===
| Election | Party leader | Votes | | % | Seats | +/– | Position | Result |
|---|---|---|---|---|---|---|---|---|
| 1962 | Kenneth Kaunda | Upper roll | 4,519 | 14.79% | 14 / 45 | ▲14 | ▲2nd | Opposition |
| 1962 | Kenneth Kaunda | Lower roll | 59,648 | 78.16% | 14 / 45 | ▲14 | ▲2nd | Opposition |
| 1964 | Kenneth Kaunda | Main roll | 570,612 | 69.1% | 55 / 75 | ▲41 | ▲1st | Supermajority government |
| 1964 | Kenneth Kaunda | Reserved roll | 6,177 | 35.2% | 55 / 75 | ▲41 | ▲1st | Supermajority government |
| 1968 | Kenneth Kaunda | 657,764 | | 73.2% | 81 / 110 | ▲26 | 1st | Supermajority government |
| 1973 | Kenneth Kaunda | 527,252 | | 100% | 125 / 136 | ▲44 | 1st | Sole legal party |
| 1978 | Kenneth Kaunda | | | 100% | 125 / 136 | Steady | 1st | Sole legal party |
| 1983 | Kenneth Kaunda | | | 100% | 125 / 136 | Steady | 1st | Sole legal party |
| 1988 | Kenneth Kaunda | | | 100% | 125 / 136 | Steady | 1st | Sole legal party |
| 1991 | Kenneth Kaunda | 314,711 | | 24.99% | 25 / 159 | ▼100 | ▼2nd | Opposition |
| 1996 | Tilyenji Kaunda | 477 | | 0.04% | 0 / 159 | ▼25 | ▼9th | Extra-parliamentary |
| 2001 | Tilyenji Kaunda | 185,535 | | 10.59% | 13 / 159 | ▲13 | ▲4th | Opposition |
| 2006 | Tilyenji Kaunda | 610,608 as part of the UDA | | 22.51% | 26 / 159 | ▲13 | ▲3rd | Opposition |
| 2011 | Tilyenji Kaunda | 18,446 | | 0.68% | 0 / 159 | ▼26 | ▼6th | Extra-parliamentary |
| 2016 | Tilyenji Kaunda | 7,253 | | 0.20% | 0 / 156 | Steady | ▼9th | Extra-parliamentary |
| 2021 | Trevor Mwamba | 12,742 | | 0.26% | 0 / 167 | Steady | ▲7th | Extra-parliamentary |
