= List of international presidential trips made by Edgar Lungu =

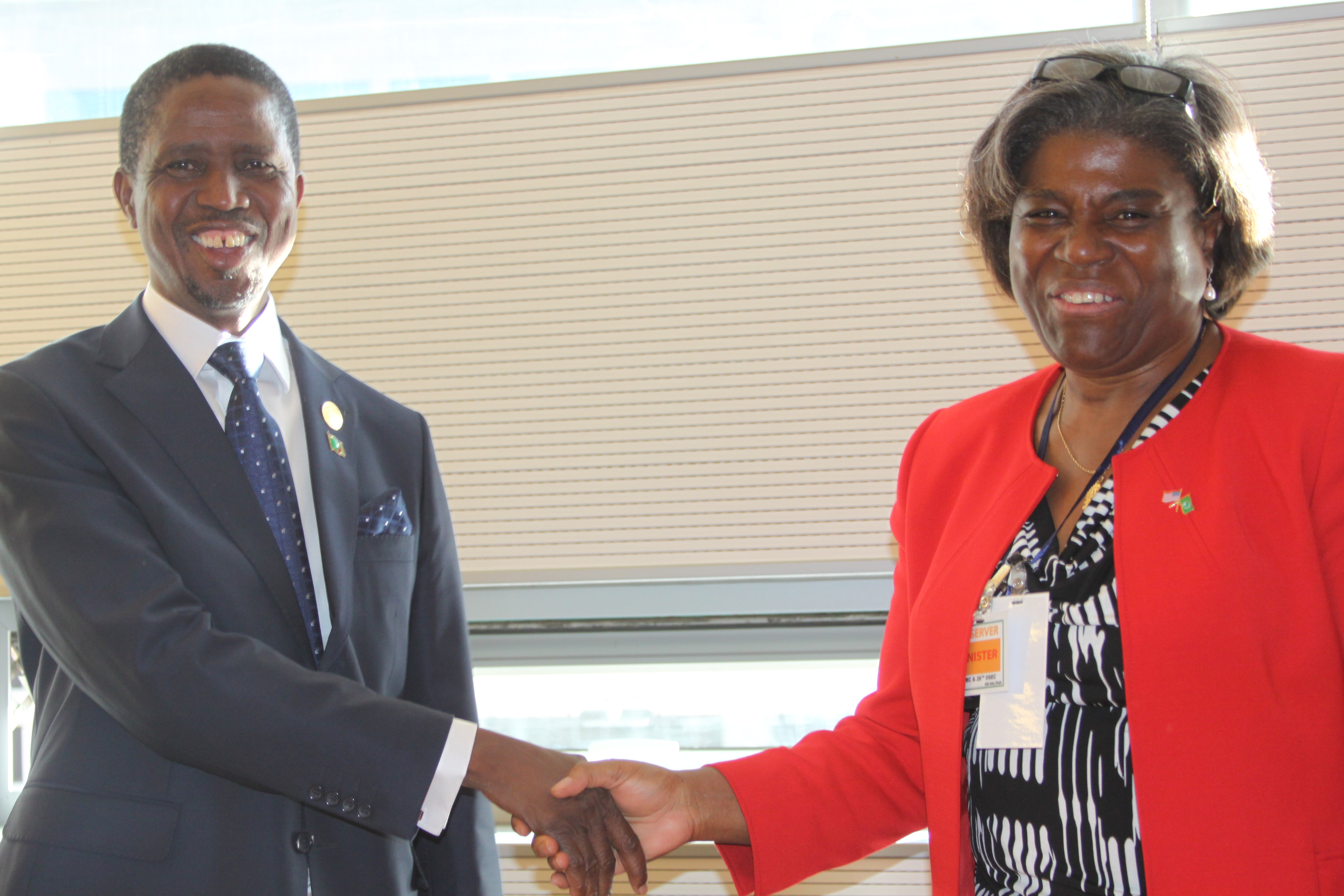
Edgar Lungu meets with Linda Thomas-Greenfield, Assistant Secretary of State for African Affairs for the United States.

Edgar Lungu (11 November 1956 – 5 June 2025) was a Zambian politician who served as the sixth President of Zambia from 26 January 2015 to 24 August 2021. He became president following the death of his predecessor Michael Sata and won the 2015 Zambian presidential election. He was re-elected in the 2016 Zambian general election but lost re-election in the 2021 Zambian general election to Hakainde Hichilema.

Lungu's frequent international trips attracted criticism from opposition parties and some commentators, who argued that they were excessive during a period of economic difficulty in Zambia. The government defended the travels, with Information Minister Dora Siliya stating that "traveling is part of the President's job description" and that the trips were necessary to attract investors.

The following is a list of international presidential trips made by Edgar Lungu during his presidency.

== Summary of international trips ==
Edgar Lungu has made several foreign trips during his tenure, mainly with a focus in the Southern African region.

Map showing International trips made by Lungu as President 1 Visit 2 Visits 3+ Visits Zambia

Number of visits	Country
1 visit	Egypt, France, Ghana, India, Italy, Japan, Kenya, Lesotho, Madagascar, Republic of the Congo, Vatican City
2 visits	Botswana, China, Equatorial Guinea, Malawi, Swaziland (Eswatini), Tanzania, Zimbabwe
3+ visits	Angola, Ethiopia, Mozambique, Namibia, South Africa, Uganda, United States

== 2015 ==
Country	Areas visited	Date(s)	Purpose(s)	Notes
Ethiopia	Addis Ababa	30 January – 1 February	24th African Union summit	Details This was Edgar Lungu's first foreign trip and he attended the 24th AU summit. Lungu held talks on the sidelines with various leaders from the AU, United Nations and United States.
Zimbabwe	Harare	6 February	State Visit	See also: Zambia–Zimbabwe relations Details Lungu held bilateral talks with Robert Mugabe and attended the ceremonial lunch after Mugabe was elected the head of the African Union.
Angola	Luanda	13 – 14 February	State Visit	Details Lungu is invited by José Eduardo dos Santos to commission the new road between Zambia and Angola.
South Africa	Pretoria	25 February	State Visit	See also: South Africa–Zambia relations Details Lungu visits South African counterpart Jacob Zuma for a one-day state visit upon the invitation of South Africa. Both president held talks and Zuma reaffirmed Lungu that South Africa would support the new presidency of the Patriotic Front.
South Africa	Johannesburg	10 – 13 March	Medical Treatment	Details Lungu is flown to South Africa for medical treatment after he collapsed at an event during his speech. Though the state denied he was in serious condition, he was flown to Johannesburg. His doctors concluded he needed throat surgery.
Mozambique	Maputo, Nacala	18 – 19 March	State Visit	Details Lungu conducts a two-day state visit where, bilateral agreements between the two countries in terms of trade and energy are signed. Lungu along with Nyusi inaugurate the Nacala Hydro Power sub-station. Lungu also inspects the Nacala Port. Lungu is also part of the inauguration of the Karpowership.
Namibia	Windhoek	21 March	Inauguration of Hage Geingob	See also: Namibian general election, 2014 Details Lungu attended the Inauguration of Hage Geingob.
China	Beijing	29 March – 1 April	State Visit	See also: China–Zambia relations Details This is Lungu's first trip outside Africa. Lungu held bilateral talks with various Chinese ministers and Xi Jinping. Various loan and investment agreements were made between the two countries in trade and infrastructure.
Zimbabwe	Harare	29 April – 1 May	Southern African Development Community summit	Details Lungu attended the Southern African Development community summit. Before the summit, Lungu held bilateral talks with Robert Mugabe. Lungu address the heads of state of the SADC community on 29 April. Lungu also officially opened the Zimbabwe International Trade Fair on 1 May.
Angola	Luanda	18 May	Extraordinary summit of the International Conference of the Great Lakes Region	Details Lungu attended the summit of the International Conference on the Great Lakes Region. The 2015 Burundian coup d'état attempt and the rise of terrorism in Kenya was the focus of the conference.
Mozambique	Maputo	26 June	Mozambique Independence Celebrations	Details Lungu attended the 40th independence day celebrations along with various leaders from the Southern African Development Community.
Uganda	Kampala	23 – 25 July	State Visit	Details Lungu visited Uganda upon invitation by Yoweri Museveni. Various topics were discussed ranging from education, industry and foreign relations.
Malawi	Blantyre	8 – 9 August	State Visit	See also: Malawi–Zambia relations Details This was lungu's first visit to Malawi. Lungu attends Malawi's 51st Independence day celebrations. Lungu also hold bilateral talks facilitating trade and transport of goods in the region between the two countries.
Botswana	Gaborone	17 – 18 August	35th SADC Heads of State and Government Summit	Details Lungu attended the 35th SADC Heads of State summit along with 14 other heads of state. The theme of the summit was 'Accelerating Industrialization of the SADC economies through transformation of natural endowments and improved human capital.'
Namibia	Windhoek, Walvis Bay	25 – 27 August	State Visit	See also: Namibia–Zambia relations Details Lungu conducted his first state visit to Namibia and also officiated the Hero's day celebrations. Lungu also extended his trip by a day to visit Walvis Bay to inspect the port and Zambia dry port at Walvis Bay.
United States	New York City	27 September – 1 October	70th session of the United Nations General Assembly	Details This was the first time Lungu addressed the United Nations as the president of Zambia. There was controversy with this trip as the president's office chartered a $400,000 plane to transport the president and his dignitaries to the United States.
Tanzania	Dar es Salaam	5 November	Inauguration of John Magufuli	See also: Tanzanian general election, 2015 Details Lungu attends inauguration of the new president of Tanzania, John Magufuli along with various heads of state.
South Africa	Johannesburg	4 – 5 December	China-Africa summit	See also: China–Zambia relations Details Lungu attends the China-Africa forum in South Africa. Lungu also officiated the Zambia-South Africa business forum.

== 2016 ==
=== First Term ===
Country	Areas visited	Date(s)	Purpose(s)	Notes
Namibia	Windhoek	15 January	Committee of Ten Summit	Details Lungu attends the Committee of Ten summit along with four other heads of state. Lungu also held bilateral talks with the President of Namibia.
Ethiopia	Addis Ababa	29 – 31 January	26th ordinary session of the African Union Heads of State summit	Details Lungu Attends the 26th ordinary session of the African Union Heads of State summit. The summit was on peace and security and also talked about the introduction of an African passport.
Italy	Rome	4 – 6 February	State Visit	Details Lungu held bilateral talks with the Food and Agriculture Organization and the International Fund for Agricultural Development in Rome. The president also met with the Zambian diaspora living in Italy. The president arrived in Italy to conduct his one-day visit to the Vatican.
Vatican City	Vatican City	5 February	State Visit	Details Lungu held talks with Pope Francis and discussed the involvement of the catholic church in Zambia. President Lungu also received a tour of the St. Peter's Basilica.
France	Paris	7 – 11 February	State Visit	Details Lungu was invited by French President François Hollande for a state visit. Lungu attended mass in Paris before conducting the official state visit. President Lungu attended a lunch session held for the Zambian diaspora living in France and latter addressed the French business community to invest in Zambia. Lungu also visited the Élysée Palace to hold talks with the French president. Lungu also gave an interview on France 24 and Radio France Internationale.
Malawi	Lilongwe	25 April	Bilateral Talks	Details Lungu visit Malawi for a 5-hour meeting between president of Malawi, Peter Mutharika and president of Mozambique, Filipe Nyusi. The meeting was a closed door meeting regarding food insecurity, cross-border water transport and refugees in the region. The presidents also discuss the Shire-Zambezi waterway project to help transport in the region.
Uganda	Kampala	11 May – 12 May	Inauguration of Yoweri Museveni	See also: Ugandan general election, 2016 Details Lungu attended the inauguration of Yoweri Museveni. On the sidelines of the event trade talks between Zambia and Uganda in the COMESA region was discussed.
Uganda	Kampala	4 July	40th anniversary of Operation Entebbe	Details Lungu attends the 40th anniversary of Operation Entebbe conducted by Israel in 1976. The event is attended by Yoweri Museveni and Benjamin Netanyahu.

=== Second Term ===
The following international trips were made by Edgar Lungu in 2016 after being inaugurated on 13 September 2016.

Country	Areas visited	Date(s)	Purpose(s)	Notes
United States	New York City	16 – 21 September	Seventy-first session of the United Nations General Assembly	Details This is the first visit by Edgar Lungu after he was inaugurated on 13 September 2016. Lungu attends the 71st session of the UN general assembly. Lungu delivered a speech regarding the "Large Movements of Refugees and Migrants." He also co-chaired the second Round Table session. Lungu also signs the Paris Agreement to append Zambia into list of countries working towards securing climate change.
Madagascar	Antananarivo	19 – 20 October	19th COMESA summit	Further information: Common Market for Eastern and Southern Africa Details Lungu attended the 19th COMESA summit along with various leaders and dignitaries from member states. President Lungu held talks on the sidelines with Hery Rajaonarimampianina, the President of Madagascar. Moreover, the president also held talks with Ibrahim Mahab, special envoy from Egypt, with regards to special public private partnerships in construction between the two countries.
Angola	Luanda	26 October	International Conference on the Great Lakes Region	Further information: Great Lakes refugee crisis Details Lungu attended the Great Lakes Regional summit in Lunda Angola. The main focus of the conference was election situation in the Democratic Republic of the Congo.
Morocco	Marrakesh	14 – 18 November	United Nations Climate Change conference	Details Lungu attended the COP22 conference on climate change.
Equatorial Guinea	Malabo	22 – 25 November	4th Africa-Arab Summit	Details Lungu attends the 4th annual Africa-Arab summit in Malabo. Lungu held bilateral talks with diplomats from the United Arab Emirates, Qatar, Kuwait and Saudi Arabia.
Tanzania	Dar es Salaam	27 – 29 November	State Visit	See also: Tanzania–Zambia relations Details Lungu made a 2-day state visit to rekindle relations with Tanzania. Various bilateral agreements were signed with respect to trade, transport, prisoner exchange and other diplomatic processes. Lungu was received at the airport by president of Tanzania, John Magufuli. Lungu visited the TAZARA Railway station and vowed to help revive the railway to its former glory. Lungu also visited the office of the Tazama Pipeline and also vowed to improve its efficiency.
South Africa	Johannesburg	7 – 9 December	State Visit	See also: South Africa–Zambia relations Details Lungu made a 2-day state visit to johannesburg to participate in the South Africa-Zambia business forum. Lungu also signed MOUs with Russian state atomic energy firm Rosatom with regards to setting up nuclear energy power plants in Zambia.

== 2017 ==
The following is a list of international presidential trips made by Lungu in 2017.

Country	Areas visited	Date(s)	Purpose(s)	Notes
Ghana	Accra	6 – 7 January	Inauguration of Nana Akufo-Addo	See also: Ghanaian general election, 2016 Details Lungu attends the inauguration of Nana Akufo-Addo. Lungu also invited the new elected president for a state visit to Zambia later in the year.
Ethiopia	Addis Ababa	27 – 31 January	28th African Union Heads of State meeting	Details Lungu attends the 28th African Union heads of State meeting. Lungu holds bilateral talks with president of South Africa, Jacob Zuma. He also attended the Southern African Development Community caucus.
Botswana	Kasane	6 – 7 February	State Visit	Details Lungu visited the town of Kasane, and was received by his Botswanan counterpart Ian Khama. Both leaders inspected Kazungula Bridge which is a jointly financed project intended to bridge both the countries.
Israel	Tel Aviv, Jerusalem	28 February – 5 March	State Visit	Details Lungu is making a 5-day state visit to Israel. He met various investors and government minister to discuss bilateral trade. Lungu also conducted bilateral talks with Benjamin Netanyahu.
Swaziland	Mbabane	17 March - 19 March	Southern African Development Community summit	Details Lungu attended the extraordinary summit of the SADC members held to discuss the fast-tracking of industrialization and integration.
Equatorial Guinea	Malabo	17 May – 18 May	African Union C10 summit	Details Lungu attended the committee of 10 AU summit held in Malabo. The aim of the meeting was to fast track UN reforms for better African representation at the security council.
Lesotho	Maseru	Jun 15	Inauguration of Tom Thabane	See also: Lesotho general election, 2017 Details Lungu attended the inauguration of Thomas Thabane in Maseru.
Swaziland	Mbabane	18 July – 19 July	State Visit	Details Lungu visits Swaziland on the personal invitation by King Mswati III for a 2-day state visit. Bilateral relations, mainly in agriculture were discussed.
United States	New York City	18 September – 20 September	Seventy-second session of the United Nations General Assembly	Details This was the third time Lungu addressed the United Nations as the president of Zambia. He pointed out the effects of global warming and the government's efforts to curb child marriages.
Angola	Luanda	25 September	Attended the inauguration ceremony of João Lourenço	Details Lungu leaves to attend The new AngolanPresident.
Republic of the Congo	Oyo	18 – 19 October	International Conference on the Great Lakes Region summit	Details President Lungu attended the summit of the International Conference on the Great Lakes Region.
Egypt	Cairo	14 – 16 November	State Visit	Details President Lungu undertook a state visit to Egypt.
Zimbabwe	Harare	23 November	Inauguration of President Emmerson Mnangagwa	Details President Lungu attended the inauguration ceremony of Zimbabwean President Emmerson Mnangagwa.
Kenya	Nairobi	28 November	Inauguration of President Uhuru Kenyatta	Details President Lungu witnessed the inauguration of Kenyan President Uhuru Kenyatta.

== 2018 ==
Country	Areas visited	Date(s)	Purpose(s)	Notes
Rwanda	Kigali	21 – 22 February	State Visit	Details President Lungu undertook a two-day state visit to Rwanda and held bilateral talks with President Paul Kagame. Several memoranda of understanding were signed.
Angola	Luanda	23 – 24 April	Working visit	Details President Lungu visited Angola amid concerns over resurfacing violence in the region.
South Africa	Johannesburg	26 – 27 July	BRICS Summit	Details President Lungu attended the BRICS Summit in South Africa.
China	Beijing	1 September	State Visit / Forum on China-Africa Cooperation	Details President Lungu arrived in Beijing for high-level meetings.
United States	New York City	16 – 21 September	73rd session of the United Nations General Assembly	Details President Lungu addressed the United Nations General Assembly.
Japan	Tokyo	17 – 20 December	Working visit	Details President Lungu described his trip to Japan as "successful."

== 2019 ==
Country	Areas visited	Date(s)	Purpose(s)	Notes
South Africa	Pretoria	8 January	Working visit / Bilateral meeting	Details President Lungu met with President Cyril Ramaphosa.
Ethiopia	Addis Ababa	9-10 February	African Union Summit	Details President Lungu attended the African Union Summit.
Mozambique	Maputo	19 June	US-Africa Business Summit	Details President Lungu attended the US-Africa Business Summit in Maputo.
Mozambique	Maputo	5 August	Visit as SADC Organ on Politics, Defence and Security Chairperson	Details President Lungu travelled to Mozambique in his capacity as Chairperson of the SADC Organ on Politics, Defence and Security, following the signing of a peace accord between the Mozambican government and Renamo.
India	New Delhi	20 – 22 August	State Visit	Details President Lungu undertook a state visit to India.
Tanzania	Dar es Salaam	31 August	SADC meeting	Details President Lungu arrived in Tanzania for a two-day SADC meeting.
United States	New York City	22 – 28 September	74th session of the United Nations General Assembly	Details President Lungu addressed the 74th session of the United Nations General Assembly.

== 2020–2021 ==
No international trips were undertaken by President Lungu in 2020 or 2021 due to the COVID-19 pandemic.

== See also ==
- Foreign relations of Zambia
- List of international presidential trips made by Hakainde Hichilema, his successor
