= List of international presidential trips made by Hakainde Hichilema =

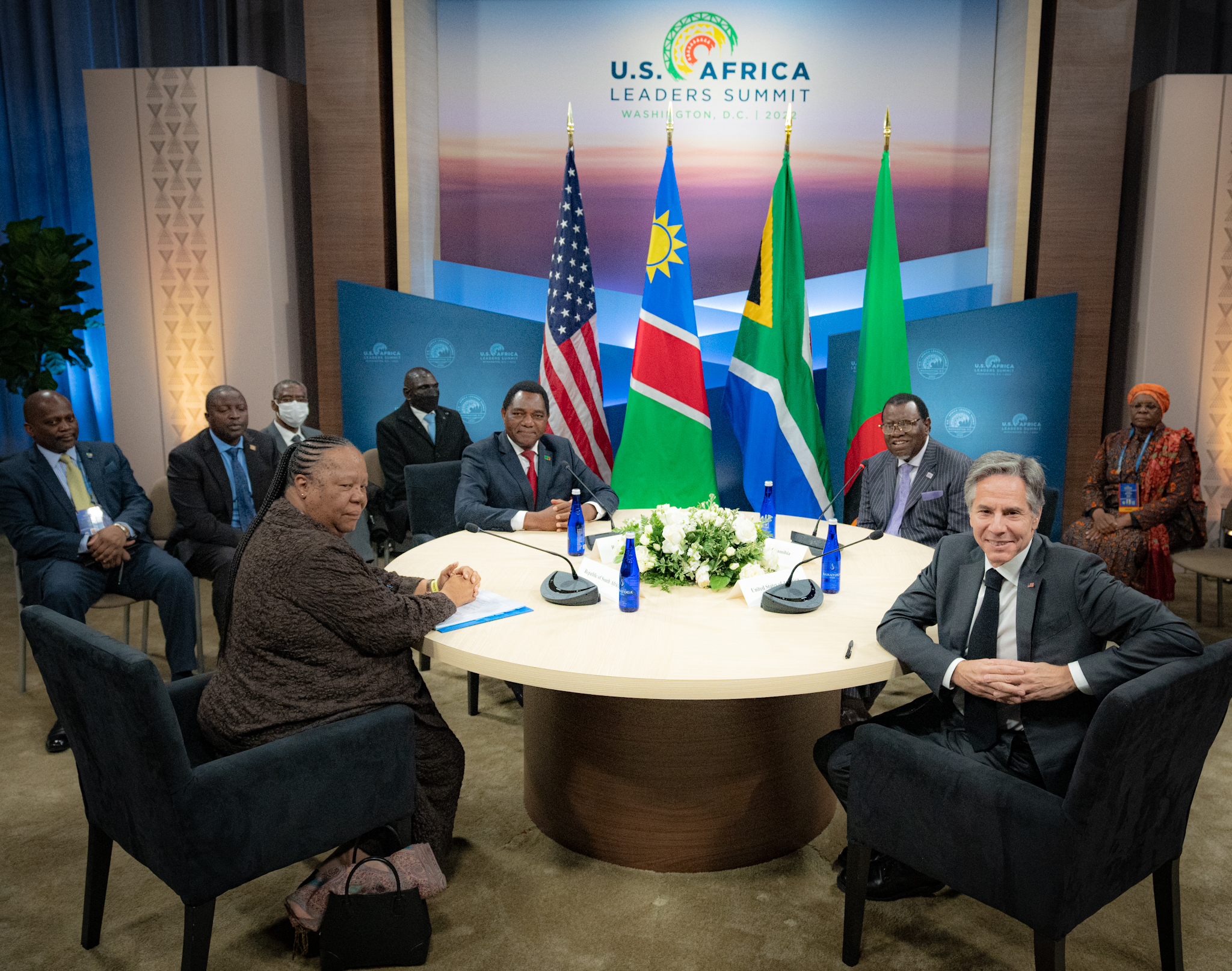
Hichilema at the United States–Africa Leaders Summit 2022

Hakainde Hichilema is a Zambian politician who has served as the seventh President of Zambia since 24 August 2021. He won the 2021 Zambian general election, defeating incumbent President Edgar Lungu.

The following is a list of international presidential trips made by Hakainde Hichilema during his presidency.

== Summary of international trips ==
Map showing International trips made by Hichilema as President 1 Visit 2 Visits 3 Visits 4+ Visits Zambia

Number of Visits	Country
1 visit	China, Germany, Ghana, Israel, Italy, Japan, Poland, Qatar, Russia, Saudi Arabia, Senegal, Ukraine, Vatican City
2 visits	Belgium, Botswana, Eswatini, France, Lesotho, Malawi, Mozambique, Rwanda
3 visits	Democratic Republic of the Congo, Egypt, Ethiopia, Kenya, Namibia, Tanzania, United States, Zimbabwe
4+ visits	United Arab Emirates (4), Angola (5), South Africa (5), United Kingdom (5)

== 2021 ==
The following international trips were made by Hakainde Hichilema in 2021.

Country	Areas visited	Date(s)	Purpose(s)	Notes
United States	New York City	20–26 September	76th United Nations General Assembly	Details Hakainde Hichilema made his first foreign trip as president of Zambia to the United States. The primary focus of the visit was to attend the 76th UNGA Conference where he addressed the general assemble on 21 September. Hichilema also met with US Vice-President Kamala Harris along with various US government officials. Hichielma also visited Zambians living in the United States and met with the African Business Council before returning home.
United KingdomScotland	Glasgow	31 October – 4 November	2021 United Nations Climate Change Conference	Details Hichilema attended the Climate Change Conference in Glasgow also known as COP26. He addressed the assembly on November 2 and throughout the conference met with various delegates on the sidelines.
South Africa	Durban	15 November	Intra-African Trade Fair 2021	Details Hakainde Hichilema attended the ribbon ceremony of the second edition of the Intra-African Trade Fair 2021. He was present along with 6 other regional heads of states.
Botswana	Kasane	20 November	World Children's Day celebrations.	Details Hakainde Hichilema attended the UNICEF World Children's Day celebrations held at the Kazungula Bridge in Botswana. The event was attended by the presidents of Botswana, Namibia, and Zimbabwe.
Democratic Republic of Congo	Kinshasa	23–24 November	DRC-Africa Business Forum 2021	Details Hakainde Hichilema attended the DRC-Africa Business Forum held in Kinshasa. Hichilema also held bilateral talks with DRC President Félix Tshisekedi, the two presidents discussed increasing co-operations in infrastructure projects, such as developing a power pool, roads and bridges.
Malawi	Lilongwe	7 December	Official visit	See also: Malawi–Zambia relations Details Hakainde Hichilema makes his first official bilateral official visit to Malawi. Hichilema met with President Lazarus Chakwera on his one-day visit. Both leaders agreed to boost trade relations between the two countries.

== 2022 ==
The following international trips were made by Hakainde Hichilema in 2022.

Country	Areas visited	Date(s)	Purpose(s)	Notes
Malawi	Lilongwe	12 January	SADC Extraordinary Summit of Heads of State and Government	See also: Insurgency in Cabo Delgado Details Hakainde Hichilema made a day trip to Malawi for the SADC Extraordinary summit. The summit primarily focused on extending the SADC Mission in Mozambique (SAMIN) past January 15.
United Arab Emirates	Abu Dhabi, Dubai	18–21 January	Expo 2020 Zambia National Day Launch	Details Hakainde Hichilema made a trip to UAE to official open the Zambian National Day at Expo 2020. The president also held bilateral talks with various UAE ministers on the sidelines.
South Africa	Johannesburg, Pretoria	26–27 January	Official visit	See also: South Africa–Zambia relations Details Hichilema made a visit to South Africa where he met his South African counterpart Cyril Ramaphosa to discuss bilateral trade and security agreements.
Ethiopia	Addis Ababa	5–6 February	35th Ordinary session of the assembly of the African Union	Details Hichilema made a visit to Ethiopia for the AU Summit. The theme of the conference was "building resilience in nutrition and food security on the African continent: strengthen agriculture, accelerate human capital, social and economic development". He held bilateral talks with various leaders on the sidelines.
Belgium	Brussels	17–18 February	6th European Union - African Union Summit	Details Hichilema attended the EUAU Summit for his first trip to the European Union. He held various talks on the sidelines of the summit.
Holy See	Vatican City	19 February	Official visit	Details Hichilema met with Pope Francis and held "cordial discussions".
South Africa	Cape Town	9–11 May	Mining Indaba 2022	Details Hichilema attended the Mining Indaba 2022 conference held in Cape Town. The conference is an event for investments in African mining investments and Hichilema was a keynote speaker. The president also held bilateral talks with South African president Cyril Ramaphosa and Botswana president Mokgweetsi Masisi.
Eswatini	Mbabane	6 June	Official visit	Details Hichilema attended the state banquet in Eswatini which was hosted by King Mswati III. The president signed two MOUs with the country in tourism and politics.
Kenya	Nairobi	15–16 June	Official visit	See also: Kenya–Zambia relations Details Hichilema made a state visit to Kenya to meet Kenyan counter-part Uhuru Kenyatta. The leaders discussed various bilateral issues, but the primary focus of the meeting was to increase direct trade between the two nations and help eliminate trade and non-trade barriers between the two nations.
Belgium	Brussels	22 June	Official visit to European Parliament.	Details Hichilema addressed the European Parliament. Among the people Hichilema met with were the President of the European Union (EU) Parliament, the EU Vice President and Commissioner for Trade, the Vice President of the EU Green Deal, and the EU Commissioner for International Partnerships.
Rwanda	Kigali	24–25 June	26th Meeting of the Heads of Government of the Commonwealth of Nations	See also: Commonwealth of Nations Details Hakainde Hichilema visited Rwanda for the 2022 Commonwealth Heads of Government Meeting.
Tanzania	Dar es Salaam	2 August	Official visit	See also: Tanzania–Zambia relations Details Hichilema made one day state visit to Tanzania to meet his counterpart President Samia Suluhu Hassan. Various MOUs were signed. Both presidents held talks to upgrade the TAZARA Railway to Standard-gauge railway status and to revamp the Tazama Pipeline. Other topics included transit cargo, defense, agriculture, trade and mining.
Democratic Republic of Congo	Kinshasa	17–18 August	42nd Ordinary Summit of SADC Heads of State	Details The organ on politics, defense, and security cooperation elected Hichilema as its new chairperson.
United States	New York City	18–23 September	Seventy-seventh session of the United Nations General Assembly	Details Hichilema attended the 77th UNGA meeting in New York City where he addressed the general debate. On the sidelines of the summit, the president held talks with: Indonesia Minister of Maritime Affairs & Investment, Mr Luhut Bisnar Pandjaitan; Starlink executives; The UN Secretary General António Guterres; Mr Tae-won Chey, who chairs of the Korean Chamber of Commerce & Industry.; World Bank Group President, David Malpass; IMF Managing Director, Kristalina Georgieva; United States Agency for International Development representatives; AB InBev CEO Michel Doukeris; The president, also met various Zambians in diaspora, attended the US-Africa Business Forum and attended the presidential dinner hosted by US president Joe Biden.
Namibia	Swakopmund	12–13 October	State Visit - Swakopmund International Trade Expo	See also: Namibia–Zambia relations Details Hichilema made two day state visit to Namibia to attended the keynote address at the Swakopmund International Trade Expo - SWAiTEX. The president was invited by Namibia President Hage Geingob. After attending the trade expo, the duo also attended the Zambia-Namibia Business Seminar.
Lesotho	Maseru	28 October	Inauguration of Sam Matekane	See also: 2022 Lesotho general election Details Hichilema made a day trip to attend the inauguration of Sam Matekane. The event was attended by various other regional head of states.
Egypt	Sharm El Sheikh	6–8 November	2022 United Nations Climate Change Conference	Details Hichilema attended the COP27 conference held in Egypt. He met with several African leaders on the sidelines of the summit and signed an MOU with the European Union on forestry projects.
United States	Washington, D.C.	12–15 December	United States–Africa Leaders Summit 2022	Details Hichilema attended the US-Africa Summit hosted by President Joe Biden. At the visit, Hichilema announced that would invest $150m in the Mingomba copper-cobalt mine in Zambia.

== 2023 ==
The following international trips were made by Hakainde Hichilema in 2023.

Country	Areas visited	Date(s)	Purpose(s)	Notes
Angola	Luanda, Lobito	11–12 January	Official visit	Details Hakainde Hichilema makes his first official bilateral official visit to Angola. Hichilema met with President João Lourenço. The two countries signed many MoUs in road, rail, oil and electricity infrastructure to increase trade between the two countries. Hichilema also addressed the Angolan parliament. Following the events in Luanda, the president went to Lobito to explore infrastructure in the city.
United Arab Emirates	Abu Dhabi	16–18 January	Working Visit	Details Hakainde Hichilema visits Abu Dhabi to attend the Abu Dhabi Sustainability Conference. Zambia and the UAE signed many MoUs mainly in the Energy and Finance sectors. On the last day of the visit, Hichilema signed a $2bn finance deal with the UAE for the development of Solar farms in the country.
Senegal	Dakar	25–26 January	Feed Africa Summit	Details Hichilema along with 18 various African leaders attended the Feed Africa Dakar 2 Summit. Hichilema was a keynote speaker on mobilizing cheaper capital for Agriculture projects. The summit hosted by the African Development Bank pledged to increase its investment in continental food production.
Namibia	Windhoek	31 January	Emergency Extraordinary SADC Troika Summit	Details Hichilema attends an Extraordinary SADC summit at the invitation of Hage Geingob to discuss the regional security situation.
Ethiopia	Addis Ababa	17–19 February	36th Ordinary session of the assembly of the African Union	Details Hichilema made a visit to Ethiopia for the AU Summit. The theme of the conference was "The Year of AfCFTA: Acceleration of the African Continental Free Trade Area Implementation." He held bilateral talks with various leaders on the sidelines.
Qatar	Doha	5–9 March	The 5th United Nations Conference on the Least Developed Countries-LDC5	Details At the LDC5 conference, where Hichilema was present, a revitalized collaboration between LDCs and their development partners was agreed upon in order to address structural issues, reduce poverty, accomplish internationally recognized development goals, and enable LDCs to leave the LDC category. He held bilateral talks with various leaders on the sidelines including António Guterres, King Mswati III, and Sheikh Mohammed Bin Abdulrahman Al-Thani.
Mozambique	Maputo, Beira	4–6 April	State visit	Details Hichilema undertook a state visit to Mozambique to bolster ties and enhance trade between the two nations. Discussions with Filipe Nyusi, the President of Mozambique, during the visit centered around strengthening cooperation in areas such as defense and security, transport and communications, industry and trade, mining, and agriculture. The Mayor of Maputo, Eneas Comiche, awarded Hichilema with the "Freedom of the City" and presented him with the Key to the City.
Zimbabwe	Victoria Falls	26 April	6th Transform Africa Summit	Details The theme of the sixth Transform Africa Summit was "Connect, Transform and Innovate," with a particular emphasis on rules and regulations, funding for digital infrastructure, capacity building and skill development, and digital continental commerce.
United KingdomScotland	London, Edinburgh	5–9 May	Coronation of Charles III and Camilla	Details Hichilema took part, on 5 May 2023, in a Commonwealth Heads of State and Government pre-coronation summit where King Charles III, the new Commonwealth Head was present. On 6 May 2023, he attended the Coronation of Charles III and Camilla. During the coronation event, Hichilema held bilateral meetings with various members of the community: Prime Minister Han Duck-soo of South Korea; Salil Shetty vice-president of the Open Society Foundations; After the summit, Hichilema headed towards Scotland at the invitation of Heriot-Watt University and the first minister Humza Yousaf. Hichilema spoke to a wider audience to encourage trade & investment support from Scotland to encourage joint ventures.
France	Paris	10 May	Meeting Emmanuel Macron	Details The meeting's discussion centered on potential for trade and investment between Zambia and France as well as problems with debt relief. The Paris Club of Creditors and the G20, which have been addressing Zambia's debt problem under the Common Debt Treatment Framework, include France as a major participant in the debt restructuring program for Zambia.
United KingdomEngland	London	10–11 May	Various meetings	Details Upon returning to London from Paris, Hichilema went to the Invest Africa-hosted Zambia Investment Forum, The Africa Debate and attended various meetings on the sidelines. Hichilema also met James Cleverly the Foreign Secretary of the United Kingdom.
Poland	Warsaw	15 June	State visit	Details Hichilema held talks with Polish president Andrzej Duda, Bilateral talks were centered around education and technology. The visit was right before Hichilema and various other African leaders began their African Peace Initiative Mission to Ukraine and the Russian Federation regarding cooperation to resolve the Russo-Ukrainian War.
Ukraine	Bucha, Kyiv	16 June	Meeting with Volodymyr Zelenskyy	See also: Russian invasion of Ukraine Details Hichilema traveled to Bucha as part of the African Peace Initiative Mission together with other African Heads of State and high-ranking officials from the Comoro Islands, the Republic of the Congo, Egypt, Senegal, South Africa, and Uganda. The delegation subsequently visited Kyiv for a meeting with Zelenskyy. Two items on the agenda were to find a peaceful solution to an end to the war and the continued flow of grain from Ukraine to the global south. Zelenskyy denied to have any negotiations unless Russia entirely withdrew its forces from Ukraine. The trip received a mix of reaction from the global community due to the poor track record of the African Union's ability to resolve conflicts in Africa.
Russia	Saint Petersburg	17 June	Meeting with Vladimir Putin	See also: Russian invasion of Ukraine Details As part of the African Peace Initiative Mission to address the situation between Russia and Ukraine, Hichilema along with three other African Heads of State and three high level government officials from three other African countries met with Putin. The initiative aimed to encourage communication and amicable negotiations between Russia and Ukraine. After a largely unsuccessful visit to Ukraine, Russia and Putin showed little to no interest to negotiate terms.
Rwanda	Kigali	20–21 June	State visit	Details Hichilema made his first state visit to Rwanda per the invitation of Rwandan counterpart Paul Kagame as a reciprocal visit Following Kagame's state visit to Zambia in April 2022. The two-day state visit by Hichilema to Rwanda began in Kigali at the invitation of Paul Kagame. Both leaders discussed bilateral relations in the matters of trade, agriculture and extradition of Rwandan genocide fugatives. Also part of the trip Hichilema visited the Kigali Genocide Memorial, Kigali House and the Kigali Special Economic Zone. On the 21st of June, Hichilema also attended the Inclusive FinTech Forum where he was a keynote speaker.
France	Paris	22–23 June	New Global Financing Pact Summit	Details Hichilema attended the New Global Financing Pact summit. The summit was focused on new multi-lateral financing for countries, especially with regards to climate change. On the sidelines of the summit, Hichilema and his team were able to negotiate a debt restructuring deal for Zambia's external debt worth $6.3bn with its creditors.
Angola	Lobito	4 July	State Visit	Details Hichilema made a day trip to Lobito where he attended the ceremony of the commencement of the concession of railway services and support logistics of the Lobito Corridor to the Lobito Atlantic Railway Company. The concession agreement covers the entire Lobito to Kolwezi line and any extensions into Zambia. The ceremony was also attended by Angolan president João Lourenço and DRC president Félix Tshisekedi.
Ghana	Accra	7–9 July	State visit	Details Hichilema made his first bilateral state visit to West Africa to Ghana. During Hichilema's three-day state visit, 10 Memoranda of Understanding (MoUs) between Ghana and Zambia were signed. Trade and investment, tourism, the arts, and culture, as well as science, technology, and innovation, were all covered by the agreements. Hichilema was also awarded an honorary doctorate degree by Valley View University.
Israel	Jerusalem	1–3 August	State visit	Details Hichilema embarked on his bilateral state visit to the Middle East, to Israel. During this momentous occasion, he had the privilege of meeting with Israeli President Isaac Herzog and Prime Minister Benjamin Netanyahu. The discussions with the president centered on exploring further avenues to strengthen trade and cooperation between their respective nations. During the meeting with Netanyahu, they engaged in fruitful discussions to explore numerous ways to enhance the relations between their countries for the mutual benefit of their citizens.
South Africa	Johannesburg	24–25 August	15th BRICS summit	Details Hichilema attended the BRICS summit as a guest.
China	Shenzhen, Jinggangshan, Fuzhou, Beijing	10–15 September	State visit	See also: China–Zambia relations Details Hichilema made his first state visit to China where we met with President Xi Jinping. He toured the country across 6 days meeting various business leaders in various industries to encourage them to invest in Zambia. Debt servicing and mining MoUs were the main discussion points between both countries.
Mozambique	Nacala	7 October	State visit	Details Hichilema attended the inauguration of newly refurbished port of Nacala in Mozambique. Presidents of Mozambique Filipe Nyusi and Malawi Lazarus Chakwera both attended the event and witnessed the signing of the Nacala Corridor Development Agreements (NDA).
Lesotho	Maseru	2 November	SADC Meeting	Details Hichilema along with Jakaya Kikwete met with the prime minister of Lesotho Sam Matekane on a Southern African Development Community working visit.
Angola	Luanda	4 November	SADC Meeting	Details Hakainde Hichilema attended the Extra-Ordinary Summit of the Heads of State and Government of the Southern African Development Community (SADC) to hold talks on strengthening peace and security in the Eastern region of the Democratic Republic of Congo (DRC).
Saudi Arabia	Riyadh	9–10 November	Saudi Arabia – Africa Summit	Details Hakainde Hichilema attended the first Saudi Arabia – Africa summit along with various other African heads of states.
Germany	Berlin	19–21 November	5th G20 Compact with Africa (CwA) Summit	Details President Hakainde Hichilema engaged in bilateral discussions with German Chancellor Olaf Scholz at the 5th G20 Compact with Africa (CwA) Summit in Berlin. The talks, held on the sidelines of the summit, focused on enhancing cooperation between Zambia and Germany. The leaders explored possibilities for German involvement in infrastructure projects and discussed the promotion of German business investments in value addition within Zambia's agriculture sector.
Italy	Rome	21–23 November	State Visit	Details Hichilema made a state visit to Italy after concluding the 5th G20 summit in Germany. He met with Italian president Sergio Mattarella. Both leaders held bilateral talks and presided over the Zambia-Italy business forum. On the last day of the visit, Hichilema paid a visit to the Maccarese Farm outside of Rome and invited the company to set up a similar operation in Zambia.
United Arab Emirates	Dubai	30 November – 3 December	2023 United Nations Climate Change Conference	Details President Hakainde Hichilema attended the 2023 United Nations Climate Change Conference also known as COP28 along with several other world leaders.

== 2024 ==
The following international trips were made by Hakainde Hichilema in 2024.

Country	Areas visited	Date(s)	Purpose(s)	Notes
Democratic Republic of Congo	Kinshasa	20 January	Inauguration of Félix Tshisekedi	Details Hakainde Hichilema attended the inauguration of Félix Tshisekedi.
Botswana	Kasane	24–25 January	Bilateral talks with Mokgweetsi Masisi	Details Hichilema attended the signing of a Memorandum of Understanding (MoU) on immigration and technical cooperation between Botswana and Zambia.
Ethiopia	Addis Ababa	16–18 February	37th ordinary Session of the African Union (AU) Assembly	Details Hichilema attended the leaders summit at the African Union. During the event, Hichilema was notably active in several key engagements: Co-hosted a meeting on vaccine manufacturing in Africa with the International Vaccine Institute.; Attended the Presidential Dialogue on Global Financial Institutions Reform.; On the side lines of the Summit, he also: Engaged in bilateral talks with President Félix Tshisekedi of the Democratic Republic of Congo.; Engaged in bilateral talks with President Paul Kagame of Rwanda.; Met with Prime Minister Sam Matekane of Lesotho.; On Sunday, February 18, Hichilema along with Samia Suluhu and other regional leaders were present during the unveiling of a new statue of the former Tanzanian President the Late Julius Nyerere at the African Union.
Namibia	Windhoek	24–25 February	Funeral of Hage Geingob	Details Hichilema attended the funeral of Namibian President Hage Geingob.
Tanzania	Dar es Salaam	25–26 April	Tanzania Union Day Celebrations	Details Hichilema attended the 60th anniversary of the Union between Tanganyika and Zanzibar. He held bilateral talks with president Samia Suluhu Hassan on the sidelines.
Kenya	Nairobi	8–9 May	Africa Fertiliser and Soil Health Summit	Details Hichilema attended the Africa Fertiliser and Soil Health Summit at the invitation of Kenyan President William Ruto.
United KingdomScotland	London, Edinburgh	18–21 June	State Visit	Details Hichilema held bilateral talks with King Charles III at Buckingham Palace on Zambia's 60th independence day anniversary. Hichilema also holds bilateral talks with John Swinney the first minister of Scotland before giving a keynote address at Heriot-Watt University. Hichilema also received an honorary doctorate degree from the University.
China	Beijing	31 August – 7 September	Forum on China–Africa Cooperation (FOCAC) Summit	See also: China–Zambia relations Details President Hakainde Hichilema visited Beijing to attend the Forum on China–Africa Cooperation (FOCAC) Summit. He held bilateral talks with President Xi Jinping and witnessed the signing of agreements aimed at revitalizing the TAZARA railway.
Burundi	Bujumbura	31 October – 1 November	23rd COMESA Summit of Heads of State and Government	Details President Hakainde Hichilema traveled to Bujumbura to attend the 23rd COMESA Summit. During the summit, he officially handed over the Chair of the Bureau of the COMESA Authority.
Angola	Luanda	4 December	Official working visit	Details President Hakainde Hichilema conducted an official working visit to Angola to discuss regional cooperation and infrastructure development.

== 2025 ==
The following international trips were made by Hakainde Hichilema in 2025.

Country	Areas visited	Date(s)	Purpose(s)	Notes
Japan	Tokyo	7 February	Japan-Zambia Summit Meeting	Details Hakainde Hichilema visited Japan for a summit meeting focused on strengthening bilateral relations and economic cooperation, including exploring Japan’s healthcare and waste management technologies.
Egypt	Cairo	23–25 February	State visit	Details Hakainde Hichilema made a state visit to Egypt at the invitation of President Abdel Fattah el-Sisi. The two leaders held bilateral talks and signed cooperation agreements in key areas including energy, agriculture, infrastructure, trade and investment, health, and transport.
United KingdomScotland	London, Glasgow	30 September – 3 October	Strategic working visit	Details Hakainde Hichilema traveled to the United Kingdom on a strategic working visit. The trip included an audience with King Charles III at a Scottish estate, reaffirming the partnership between Zambia and the UK. He also held meetings with UK officials on economic cooperation and investment.
Tanzania	Dodoma	3 November	Inauguration of Samia Suluhu Hassan	See also: Tanzania–Zambia relations Details Hakainde Hichilema visited Dodoma to attend the inauguration ceremony of President Samia Suluhu Hassan for her second term. He was among several regional leaders present at the event.
Zimbabwe	Harare	14 November	State visit	See also: Zambia–Zimbabwe relations Details President Hakainde Hichilema undertook a State Visit to Zimbabwe at the invitation of President Emmerson Mnangagwa. He co-chaired the inaugural session of the Zambia–Zimbabwe Bi-National Commission (BNC).

== 2026 ==
The following international trips were made by Hakainde Hichilema in 2026.

Country	Areas visited	Date(s)	Purpose(s)	Notes
South Africa	Cape Town	5 February	Investing in African Mining Indaba	Details Hakainde Hichilema delivered a keynote address at the Investing in African Mining Indaba in Cape Town, outlining Zambia’s strategies to boost its mining sector and copper production.
Eswatini	Mbabane	24–26 April	40th anniversary of King Mswati III’s reign and 58th birthday celebrations	Details President Hakainde Hichilema visited Mbabane to join other Heads of State for the double celebrations marking King Mswati III’s 40 years on the throne and his 58th birthday.
Kenya	Nairobi	11–12 May	Africa-France Partnerships for Innovation and Growth Summit	Details Hakainde Hichilema traveled to Nairobi to attend the Africa-France Partnerships for Innovation and Growth Summit alongside other African and European leaders.
United Arab Emirates	Abu Dhabi	29–30 September	State visit	Details Hakainde Hichilema made a two-day state visit to the United Arab Emirates at the invitation of President Mohamed bin Zayed Al Nahyan. He held an official bilateral meeting with Sheikh Mohamed, which concluded with the signing of memoranda of understanding. He also took part in a Zambia–UAE business and investment forum, met UAE business leaders and met the Zambian community in the UAE.
Zimbabwe	Harare	22 October	25th COMESA Summit of Heads of State and Government	See also: Zambia–Zimbabwe relations Details Hakainde Hichilema traveled to Zimbabwe to attend the 25th COMESA Summit of Heads of State and Government.

== See also ==
- Foreign relations of Zambia
- List of international presidential trips made by Edgar Lungu, his predecessor
