= Itezhi-Tezhi (constituency) =

Zambian National Assembly constituency

Itezhi-Tezhi was a constituency of the National Assembly of Zambia. It covered the towns of Itezhi-Tezhi, Kaliwa, Mashie, Musungwa and Shezongo in Itezhi-Tezhi District of Southern Province.

== List of MPs ==
Election year	MP	Party
1991	Mda Shimabo	United National Independence Party
1996	Luminzu Shimaponda	Movement for Multi-Party Democracy
2001	Bates Namuyamba	Movement for Multi-Party Democracy
2006	Godfrey Beene	United Democratic Alliance
2011	Greyford Monde	United Party for National Development
2016	Herbert Shabula	United Party for National Development
2021	Twaambo Mutinta	United Party for National Development
Seat abolished (split into Itezhi-Tezhi East and Itezhi-Tezhi West)
