= Itezhi-Tezhi West =

National Assembly constituency in Zambia

Itezhi-Tezhi West is a constituency of the National Assembly of Zambia. It was created in 2026 when Itezhi-Tezhi constituency was split into two constituencies (Itezhi-Tezhi West and Itezhi-Tezhi East). It covers the western part of Itezhi-Tezhi District, including the Itezhi-Tezhi town centre and Ngoma.

== List of MPs ==
Election year	MP	Party
2026	Twaambo Mutinta	United Party for National Development
