= Twaambo Mutinta =

Zambian politician

Honorable Twaambo Mutinta

Elected member of the National Assembly
- In office August 2021 – 15 May 2026
- Constituency: Itezhi-Tezhi
- Incumbent
- Assumed office August 2026
- Constituency: Itezhi-Tezhi West

Personal details
- Born: Twaambo Elvis Mutinta; 28 September 1983 (age 42) Zambia
- Party: United Party for National Development
- Children: 3

Twaambo Elvis Mutinta (born 28 September 1983) is a Zambian politician who currently serves as the member of parliament for Itezhi-Tezhi West. He previously served as the Member of Parliament for Itezhi-Tezhi from 2021 to 2026.

== Early life and education ==
Mutinta was born in September 1983. He did his primary education at Green Acres Primary and his high school at Kalomo Secondary in Kalomo. He worked as a project manager at Oxfarm Zambia and taught at Uphill High School in Itezhi-Tezhi District.

He holds a Bachelor’s Degree in Adult Education, Diploma in Secondary Education from the University of Zambia and has a Masters Degree in Development Studies from the University of Lusaka.

== Political Career ==
Mutinta was adopted as the United Party for National Development (UPND) candidate in Itezhi-Tezhi constituency at the 2021 general election and he was elected.

In May 2023, he was among the Zambian MPs visiting Kenya for curriculum education benchmark.

Ahead of the 2026 general election, Itezhi-Tezhi was split into two constituencies, namely Itezhi-Tezhi East and Itezhi-Tezhi West. Mutinta was adopted as the UPND candidate in Itezhi-Tezhi West and he was elected.
