= Dumisani Ncube =

Zambian Entrepreneur (born 1989)

- Born: July 1, 1989 (age 37); Central Province, Zambia
- Citizenship: Zambia
- Education: Zambia Centre for Accountancy Studies, University of Lusaka
- Occupations: Entrepreneur, motivational speaker
- Known for: Self made Zambian millionaire

Dumisani Lingamangali Ncube (born 1 July 1989) is a Zambian entrepreneur, businessman, and motivational speaker.

== Early life ==
Ncube was born in a thatched village on a farm in central Zambia. He grew up herding goats and cattle. He started his entrepreneurial journey in grade nine in Zambia selling pamphlets to supplement his needs, then opened a kiosk selling food basics.

In his teenage years, he traded in goats, then started importing blankets and clothes from Botswana and South Africa.

In 2006, he completed his secondary school education at Matero Boys Secondary School. In 2009, he enrolled at Kitwe's ZIBSIP college to pursue a Zambia Institute of Chartered Accountants (ZICA) Level 1 and 2, graduating in 2012.

In 2010, aged 18, he survived an attack by robbers in Johannesburg, South Africa.

== Career ==
In 2012, with two colleagues, he started Gladtidings software Ltd, a provider of school management system software. This became the most widely-used school management system in Zambia, generating a turnover in excess of $200,000 within 10 months. Using proceeds from this business, Ncube then started transport and construction companies.

In 2013, he went to ZCAS University to complete the ZICA professional qualification.

In 2015, Ncube launched DLN Technologies, producing identity cards for schools and other organisations, and dealing in PVC card printers, smart card printers and software and security technologies. Within months, the company was generating over $13,000 in monthly profits. In 2016, He received a performance award from Evolis in recognition of his business performance - the first Zambian and the youngest African CEO to receive the award.

== Recognition ==
Ncube has spoken at many different platforms in Africa on business and entrepreneurship. He has spoken in Malawi, Ghana, Zimbabwe, and at Lusaka's Heroes stadium. In 2019, he won his first entrepreneur of the year award. In 2021 he won the Most Influential Youth of the year award.
