= Zumani Zimba =

Zambian Political Scientist

Chris Zumani Zimba
- Born: Eastern Province, Zambia
- Education: Political Science
- Alma mater: University of Zambia; University of Lusaka; Osnabrück University
- Occupation: Political scientist
- Years active: 2013–present
- Title: Political Advisor to Zambian President
- Term: 2019–2025
- Political party: Patriotic Front

Chris Zumani Zimba is a Zambian political scientist who served as political advisor to Zambian president Edgar Lungu from 2019 until his death in 2025. He became State House Advisor to the President in 2019 after having served as consultant of the ruling Patriotic Front.

== Education ==
Zimba studied political science at the University of Zambia from 2004 to 2007. He then completed a master's degree in political science from Osnabrück University in Germany before completing a PhD from the University of Lusaka between 2015 and 2021 in the same field. In addition, he obtained a certificate in 'diplomatic practice, protocol and public relations' from Zambia Institute of Diplomacy and International Studies (ZIDIS) in 2009 and has a Division One Grade 12 Certificate from Lotus Basic GEC School.

== Politics ==
In October 2019, Zimba was hired by the ruling Patriotic Front (PF) then to 'assess and advise on how PF could defend power in the 2021 Presidential and General elections'. Despite his conclusive observations that "PF was too weak and vulnerable to win and defend power in 2021" being heavily opposed by most PF Members of Central Committee, he was officially appointed by President Edgar Lungu on 20 December 2019 as his political advisor. He is a member of the Tonse Alliance, an opposition coalition of Zambian political parties.

== Writings and civil society advocacy ==
Zimba is a Zambian published author of five books on politics and civil society organisations. Between 2013 and 2018, he worked full time with different public health international organizations such John Snow International (JSI), Plan International and Pact World under SHARe II USAID Project as well as ZCHIP USAID Project as policy advocacy specialist as well as cultural communications advisor. Between 2013 and 2019, he was a part-time political science and public policy lecturer at the University of Zambia (UNZA) and University of Lusaka (UNILUS) besides being the founding consultant and anchor researcher of University of Central Africa (UCA). Raised in Kapatamoyo hills near Chipata, in March 2023, Ngoni King, Mpezeni Four of the Ngoni people of Eastern Province appointed Zimba as board chairman of the Nsingo Ngoni Museum.
