= Humphrey Nyone =

Zambian military officer

Lieutenant general Humphrey Nyone is a Zambian military officer. He has been force commander of the United Nations Multidimensional Integrated Stabilization Mission in the Central African Republic (MINUSCA) since 15 May 2023.

== Career ==
Nyone joined the Zambian Defence Force in 1994. He served in the United Nations Mission in Sierra Leone from 2001 to 2002 where he held the position of Chief of Operations of the 1st Zambian Battalion. From 2006 to 2007 Nyone was deployed in United Nations Mission in the Democratic Republic of Congo where he served as military observer and Senior Disarmament, Demobilization, Repatriation, Reintegration and Resettlement Officer.

He was the Director-General for Policy, Doctrine and Strategy of the Zambian Army from 2018 to 2020 and served as the Commander of the 1st Infantry Division from 2020 to 2022. Successively he was Commander of the 6th Armored Brigade, Commander of the 64th Armored Regiment and Commander of the Armored School. He later served as Commander of the Staff College of Zambian Defence Force. He was appointed force commander of MINUSCA by United Nations Secretary General, António Guterres, on 15 May 2023. He succeeded Daniel Sidiki Traoré in this position. Nyone was promoted to lieutenant general by Zambian president Hakainde Hichilema on 6 June 2023.

Nyone studied at the University of Lusaka and obtained a master's degree in business administration as well as defence and security studies. He studied at the United States Army Command and General Staff College and the National Defence College of Zambia.

== Personal life ==
Nyone is married and has five children.
