= Against All Odds (biography) =

Biography of Edgar Lungu

Against All Odds: Zambia's President Edgar Chagwa Lungu's Rough Journey to State House
- Against All Odds - Zambia's President Edgar Chagwa Lungu's Rough Journey to State House
- Author: Anthony Mukwita
- Subject: Edgar Lungu
- Genre: Biography
- Publisher: Partridge Africa
- Publication date: 2017
- Publication place: Zambia
- Media type: E-book, print (hardback and paperback), and audiobook
- Pages: 174
- ISBN: 978-1-4828-7724-3 (2017 ed.)

Against All Odds: Zambia's President Edgar Chagwa Lungu's Rough Journey to State House is a biography of Zambia's former President Edgar Lungu by the Zambian journalist and senior diplomat Anthony Mukwita, published by Partridge Africa on 5 January 2017.

Mukwita previously worked as Editor-in-Chief of the Daily Mail, Zambia's largest daily circulation newspaper, and was a World Bank winner for Best Investigative Journalism in 2012.

== Overview ==
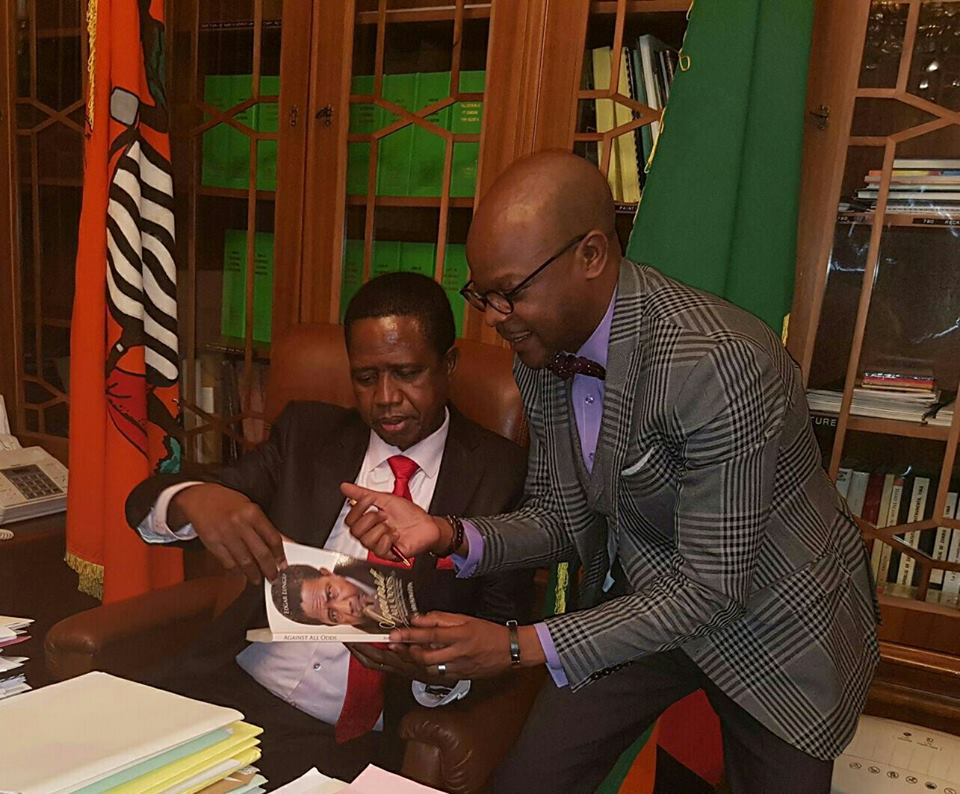
Author Anthony Mukwita gives President Edgar Lungu a copy of Against All Odds in January 2017.

Against All Odds is written by a first-time writer about Zambia's President Edgar Lungu and his path from an unassuming lawyer and minister to the president of one of the world's leading copper-producing countries.

== Editions ==
- First, 2017. Partridge Africa .
  - Paperback, 2017. Partridge Africa. (174 pages)
  - Hardback, 2017. Partridge Africa. (174 pages)
