= University of Lusaka =

Private university in Zambia

- Motto: Passion for quality education: Our Driving force
- Type: Private, for-profit
- Established: 2007; 19 years ago
- Founder: Pinalo Chifwanakeni
- Chancellor: Caleb Fundanga
- Vice-Chancellor: Pinalo Chifwanakeni
- Administrative staff: ▲300
- Students: ▲9000
- Location: Lusaka, Zambia; 15°23′31″S 28°19′38″E
- Campus: Urban
- Nickname: UNILUS
- Website: www.unilus.ac.zm

University of Lusaka (UNILUS) is a private university founded in 2007 in Lusaka, Zambia. It is a member of the Association of Commonwealth Universities. It consists of three campuses in Lusaka.

== Organisation ==
UNILUS schools include; Business and Management, Law, Health Sciences and Education, Social Sciences & Technology. The university also has the School of Postgraduate studies which offer Masters and Doctorate programs. The university has two semesters in a year, the January and June semesters. The University of Lusaka has over 30 undergraduate and postgraduate degree programmes. The University of Lusaka is divided into the following faculties:

School of Business and Management

- Bachelor of Science in Human Resource Management
- Bachelor of Science in Purchasing and Supply
- Bachelor of Accountancy
- Bachelor of Science Honours in Accounting and Finance
- Bachelor of Science in Marketing
- Bachelor of Business Administration
- Certificate in Innovation and Entrepreneurship
- Bachelor of Science in Economics and Finance
- Bachelor of Science in Banking and Finance
- Bachelor of Arts in Economics
- Bachelor of Science in Insurance and Pension Management
- Bachelor of Science in Actuarial Science
- Bachelor of Science in Logistics and Transport Management

School of Law

- Bachelor of Law

School of Medicine And Health Sciences

- Bachelor of Science in Public Health
- Bachelor of Medicine and Surgery
- Bachelor of Medicine and Surgery (Pre-Med)
- Diploma in Registered Nursing

School of Education, Social Sciences and Technology

- Bachelor of Education in Educational Administration and Management
- Bachelor of Business Administration with Education
- Bachelor of Science in Real Estate Management
- Bachelor of Science in Politics and International Relations
- Bachelor of Science in Public Administration
- Bachelor of Art in Development Studies
- Bachelor of Science in Information Systems and Technology
- Bachelor of Science in Information Systems and Technology With Education

School of Postgraduate Studies

- MastersProgrammes
- Master of Science in Risk Management
- Master of Science in Public Finance and Taxation
- Master of Science in Logistics and Transport Management
- Master of Science in Insurance and Pensions Management
- Master of Business Administration In Banking and Finance
- Master of Business Administration With Education
- Master of Business Administration (Finance)
- Master of Business Administration
- Masters of Science in Auditing
- Master of Science in Accounting and Finance
- Master of Science in Marketing Management
- Master of Public Administration
- Master of Science in Project Management
- Master of Arts in Human Resource Management
- Master of Science in Economics and Finance
- Master of Science in Procurement and Supply Chain Management
- Master of Business Administration In Healthcare Management
- Executive MBA in Leadership & Wealth Creation
- Master of Arts in Educational Administration and Management
- Master Of Public Health
- Master Of Science In Environmental Management
- Master of Arts In Development Studies
- Master of Arts in Peace and Security Studies
- Master of Arts in Peace and Security Studies
- Master of Laws (LLM) / MPhil – Commercial and Corporate Law
- Master of Laws (LLM) / MPhil – Banking and Finance Law
- Master of Laws (LLM) / MPhil – Human Rights Law
- Master of Laws (LLM) / MPhil – Labour Law
- Master of Laws (LLM) / MPhil – Tax Law

Postgraduate Diploma Programmes:

- Lecturing/Teaching Methodology for Lecturers
- Quality Assurance in Higher Education
- Supervision and Examination of Students Research Projects

PHD/Doctoral Programmes:

- Doctor of Laws
- Doctor of Business Administration

== Notable alumni ==
- Twaambo Mutinta
- Golden Mwila
- Dumisani Ncube
- Humphrey Nyone

== See also ==
- List of universities in Zambia
