= Inauguration of Edgar Lungu =

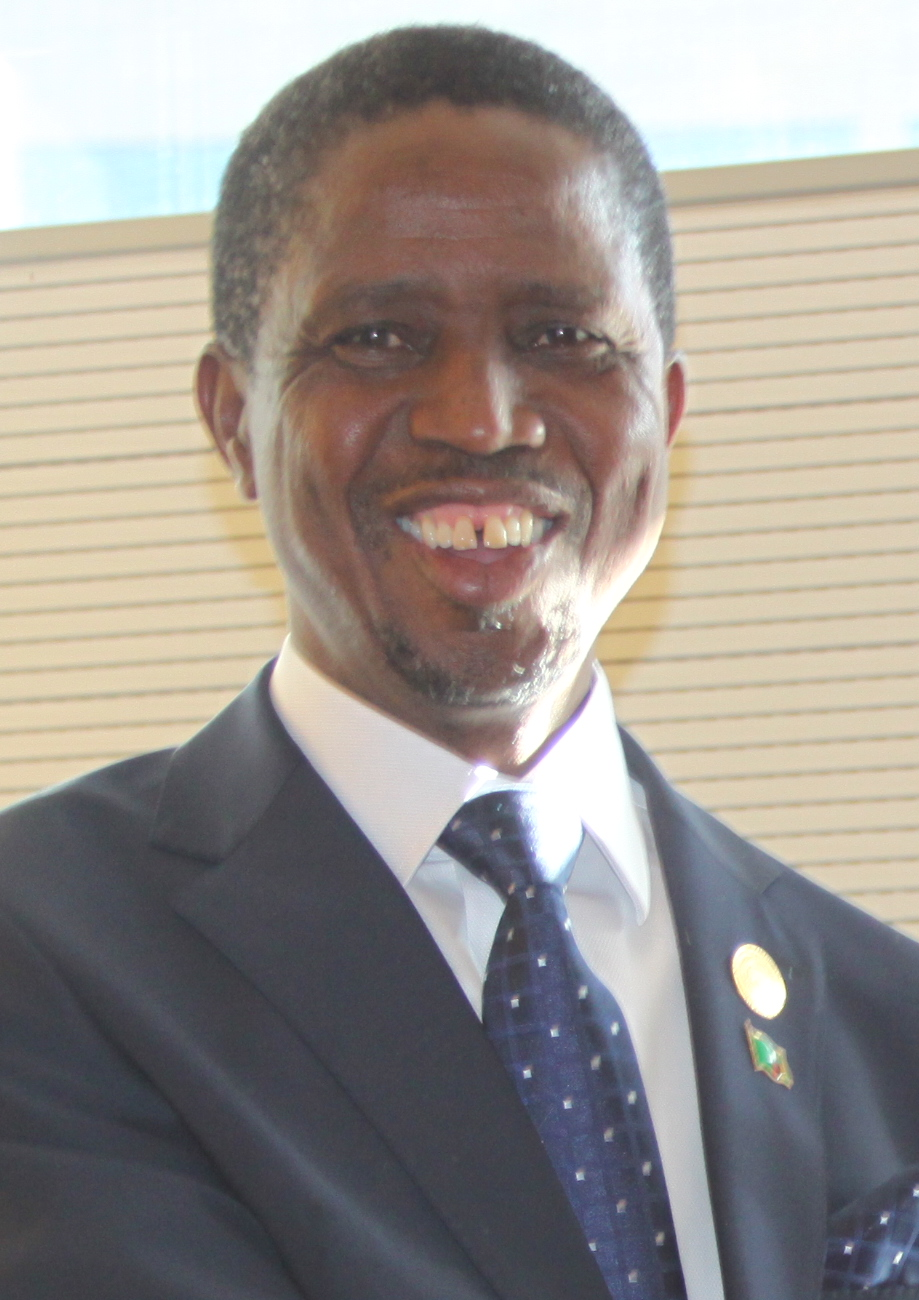
- Date: 13 September 2016
- Location: National Heroes Stadium, Lusaka
- Participants: President-elect: Edgar Lungu; Vice President: Inonge Wina

The inauguration of Edgar Lungu as the 6th president of Zambia took place on 13 September 2016. This was the second time Edgar Lungu took the oath after he first took office on 25 January 2015. Edgar Lungu took the oath alongside Inonge Wina as Vice-President of Zambia. The day of the inauguration was set as a public holiday in Zambia and Monday September 12 as a half working day.

Lungu won the controversial August 2016 presidential election, receiving 50.35% of the votes. The election received various criticisms from the opposition party and the opposition petitioned the High court to block the inauguration. However, the high court rejected the application.

== Inaugural events ==
=== Planning ===
The planning of the inauguration of President-elect Edgar Lungu started on the 16th of August but the planning and works were suspended after a presidential petition was filed in an urgent application contesting the validity of President Edgar Lungu's win by Hakainde Hichilema, UPND President and his running mate Geoffrey Bwalya Mwamba. On 5 September The Constitutional Court dismissed the petition against the election of President Edgar Lungu by United Party for National Development leader Hakainde Hichilema and his running mate Geoffrey Bwalya Mwamba on grounds that its mandate lapsed at 23:59 on Friday. After this the preparations started for the inauguration of president-elect Monday 12 September was set a half working day and Tuesday 13 was a public holiday.

=== Swearing-in ceremony ===
The official swearing-in ceremony took place at the National Heroes Stadium in Lusaka from 0800 hours (UTC) on 13 September 2016. Lungu arrived at the swearing in venue with his wife to a roaring crowd at 0835 (UTC). A priest delivered a prayer to commence the official proceedings. Under the observation of the Chief Justice of Zambia, Irene Mambilima, at 0900 (UTC) Lungu took his oath of office. Lungu then addressed the nation.

=== Inauguration speech (excerpt) ===
Country Men and Women,

My primary duty this morning is to enjoin everyone of you, my dear compatriots, to join me in bowing our heads to thank God almighty for his omnipresent mercy and compassion in guiding us through the delicate electoral process that ended generally peaceful. Our new mission must now be to give ourselves the ability and confidence to be masters in our own destiny.

We must begin to conclusively wean our economy from the current copper mining dominated mono-economy. In this new dispensation we must promote and sustain agriculture to become one of the main drivers of our diversification programme.

My fellow Zambians, we must now start to redouble our efforts at indigenising investment in science and technology research, in development and in innovation. To do this, our skills base must improve correspondingly.

I can announce here that my administration will in this term of office, pursue nuclear technology as part of the a diversified sustainable energy mix to power our economy. I also have good news that somewhere in the north of the country, in block 31, investors have begun a promising exploration project for oil and gas.

Engaging in corruption cannot be a substitute to the pride that comes from personal effort and determination to achieve prosperity.

Let every village, chiefdom and town reverberate to the rhythm of our hard-working men, women and the youth. I can see and feel your aspirations, in Lumumba road, in Mongu, in Solwezi, in Chipata, in Mpika, in Kawambwa, in Mumbwa…Chimwemwe, Kanyama, in Chingola, and of course in Dundumwezi. Yes I hear you all.

My Dundumwezi promise stands…I am coming to greet those 252 dear supporters of mine and hope to convert more! I feel and hear your needs and we will not let you down. Let me end by saying let us hold each other’s hand and move forward together. We can jointly and whilst holding hands together climb even the highest mountain without being daunted by its summit. Thank you-mother Zambia; May God bless you all,

God bless the republic of Zambia!

— Edgar Lungu, Full Inauguration speech, Lusaka Times

== Dignitaries in attendance ==
Country	Title	Dignitary
Botswana	President	Ian Khama
Kenya	Deputy President	William Ruto
Malawi	Vice-President	Saulos Chilima
Namibia	Vice-President	Nickey Iyambo
Tanzania	Vice-President	Samia Suluhu
Zimbabwe	President	Robert Mugabe

President John Magufuli of Tanzania canceled his trip on 11 September 2016 due to the Tanzanian earthquake; Vice President Samia Suluhu attended instead. Yoweri Museveni was also expected to attend the event, however, he went to Somalia instead, for the 28th IGAD Extra ordinary summit.

=== Government representatives ===
Country	Title	Dignitary
Swaziland	Deputy Prime Minister	Paul Dlamini

=== International organization representatives ===
Organisation	Title	Dignitary
African Union	Commissioner for Economic Affairs	Anthony Mothae Maruping
International Conference on the Great Lakes Region	Executive Secretary	Ntumba Luaba
Southern African Development Community	Executive Secretary	Stergomena Tax
Common Market for Eastern and Southern Africa	Secretary-General	Sindiso Ngwenya
Commonwealth of Nations	Deputy Secretary General	Deodat Maharaj
