= Evolis =

French company

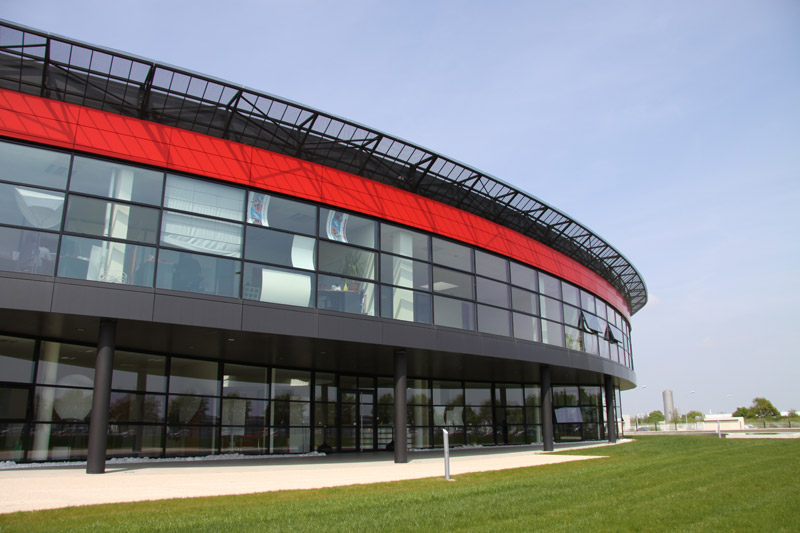
- Type: S.A. (corporation)
- Traded as: ALTVO - Alternext
- Founded: December 1999
- Founders: Emmanuel Picot, Cécile Belanger, Serge Olivier, Didier Godard, Yves Liatard
- Headquarters: Beaucouzé, France
- Area served: Worldwide
- Revenue: ▲EUR €82M (2018)
- Net income: ▲EUR €8,8M (2017)
- Number of employees: 380+
- Website: www.evolis.com

Evolis is a French plastic card manufacturing company. Their headquarters and the production facility are located near Angers, France.

== Overview ==
Evolis was founded in 1999 by CEO Emmanuel Picot, vice president Cécile Belanger, Didier Godard, Yves Liatard and Serge Olivier. All worked previously for an American manufacturer of plastic card printers with operations in France. The company became publicly traded at the Alternext Paris stock exchange in 2006.

In 2006, the company opened a subsidiary in Singapore. It opened a sales office in Shanghai, China in 2009. In 2012, it acquired Sogedex Accessories based in Trappes, France. The next year, it acquired 70% of the Indian company Rajpurohit Cardtec which became a subsidiary under the name of Evolis India.

In 2014, the company acquired Detraplast and integrated it into its production facilities in Beaucouzé.

In 2016, Evolis announced the acquisition of a majority stake in CardPresso, a card design software company. The same year, Evolis announced it had completed installation of 50,000 systems in banks worldwide. In 2016, the company was awarded a US$1.2 million contract with the Social Security department of Shandong, China to produce combination debit and social security cards. The hardware for the project is planned to be manufactured in Beaucouzé, and deployed some time in December.

As of December 2018, the company had sold 540,000 printers in 140 countries. In 2019, the company opened a Japanese subsidiary.

Previous clients have included the French supermarket Intermarché, the RATP public transit service in Paris, voting cards for Tanzania, health insurance cards for Poland, and accreditation badges for the Cannes Film Festival.

In September 2023 Evolis announced that 98.5% of the company has been purchased by HID.
