= Tanzania–Zambia relations =

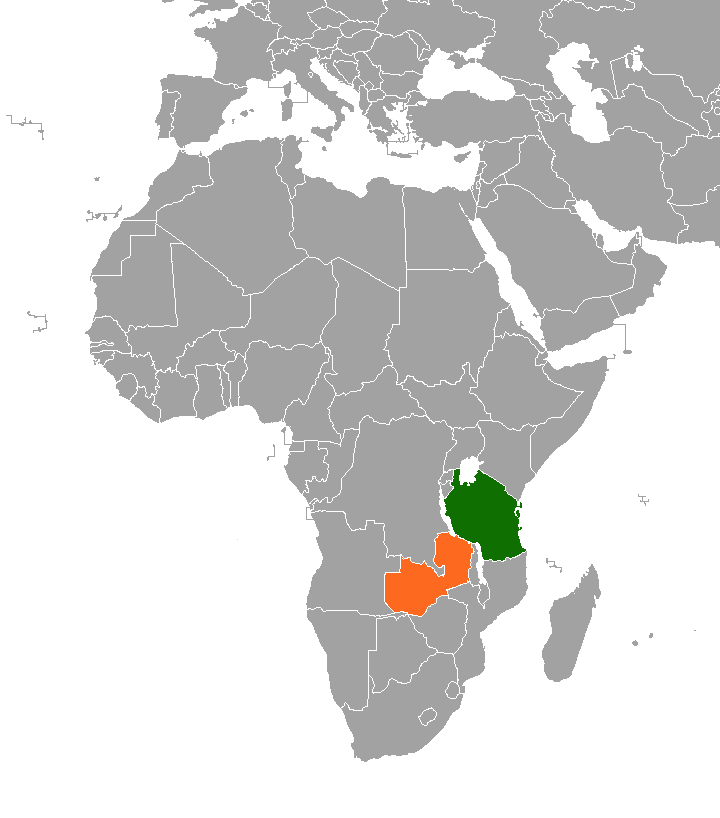
- Tanzania: Zambia

Tanzania–Zambia relations are bilateral relations between Tanzania and Zambia. Tanzania and Zambia are one of the oldest allies in the region and together formed the front line nations for independence for neighboring African nations.

Both nations are part of the Southern African Development Community, African Union and Non-Aligned Movement.

== History ==
In 1966, an oil pipeline known as TAZAMA was constructed between the two countries. The name is an abbreviation derived from Tanzania, Zambia, and mafuta (the Swahili word for oil). Two-thirds of the company's shares are owned by the Government of Zambia and one-third by the Government of Tanzania. The pipeline transports crude oil from the Tanzanian port city of Dar es Salaam to the Zambian city of Ndola. The total length of the pipeline is 1,705 km.

Between 1970 and 1975, a railway was constructed linking Zambia and Tanzania. The railway has a total length of 1,860 km and was built with financial support from the People's Republic of China..

At present, the two countries maintain friendly relations. In February 2015, Tanzanian President Jakaya Kikwete paid a two-day visit to Lusaka at the invitation of Zambian President Edgar Lungu. In November 2015, Lungu made an official visit to Dar es Salaam, where he met with Tanzanian President John Magufuli. In November 2016, Lungu again paid an official visit to Tanzania, holding talks with his Tanzanian counterpart Magufuli. The leaders of both countries discussed the possibility of further expanding economic cooperation.

== Trade and economy ==
The balance of trade between the two nations is very stable and in 2013 Tanzania exported $92.7 million worth of goods to Zambia. Zambia imports various products from Tanzania, mainly machinery, building material and processed foods. On the other hand, Zambia exported $71.4 million worth of goods in 2013, mainly agriculture products such as corn and copper products.

=== Infrastructure ===
Zambia is a landlocked country and most of its goods are exported and imported through the Port of Dar es Salaam. Mainly Vehicles and Refined oil is transported from Dar es Salaam to Zambia and Copper is transported from Zambia to the port.

==== Tazama pipeline ====
The Tazama pipeline was built in 1968 and is a 1,710 km pipeline spanning from TIPER refinery in Dar es Salaam and the Indeni refinery in Ndola, Zambia. The pipeline is designed to carry 1.1 million tonnes per year and is owned by the Tazama Pipeline Limited. The company is jointly owned by the Government of Zambia (66.7%) and Government of Tanzania (33.3%).

==== TAZARA railway ====
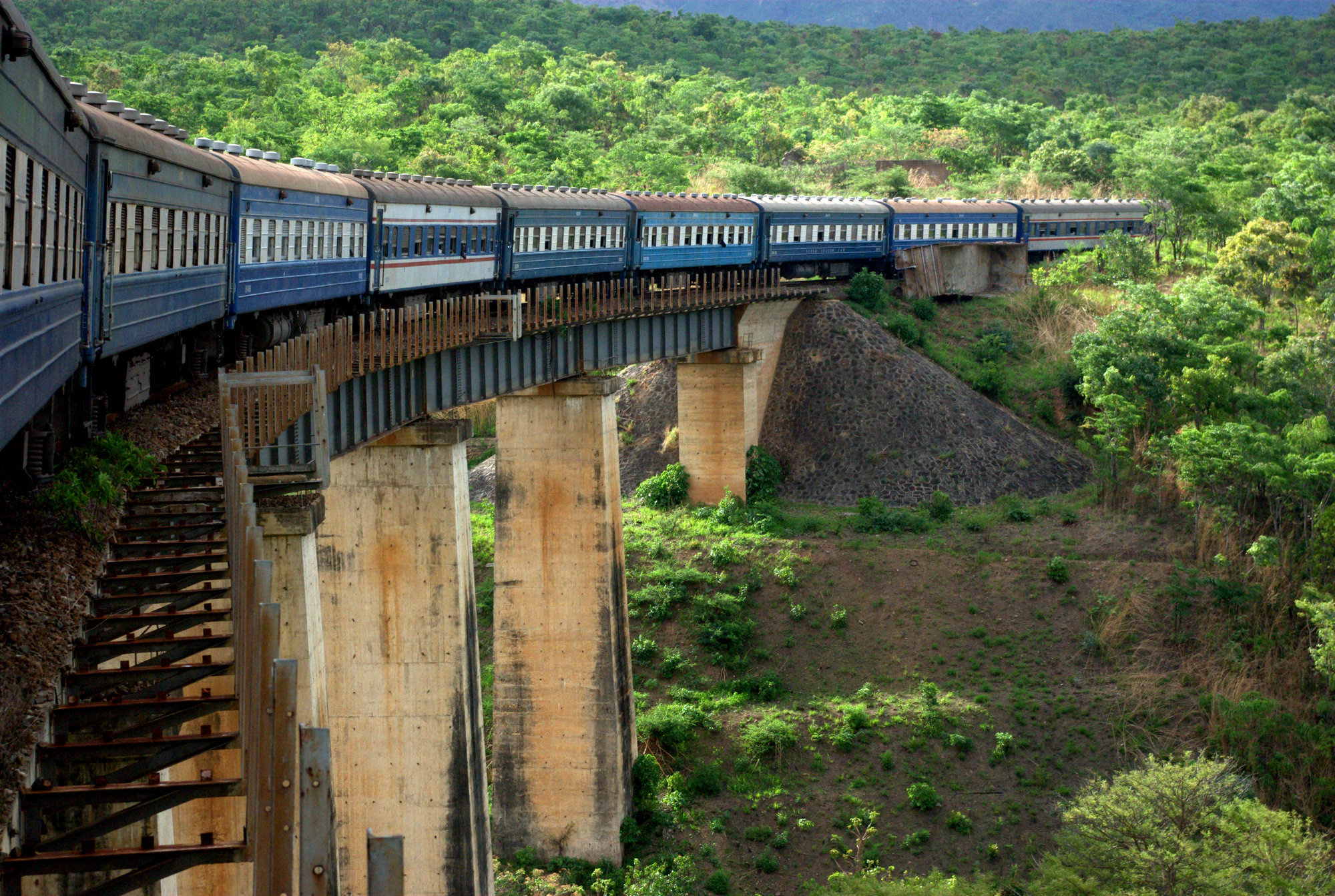
Bridge crossing on the Tazara Railway in Zambia in 2009

The TAZARA is a single-track railway and is 1,860 km long and was built between 1970 and 1975. The Project was entirely funded by the Chinese and was the largest foreign aid project by China at the time. The railway was built to reduce economic dependence of Zambia on Rhodesia and South Africa, which was ruled by white minority government. The Railway is primarily used to transport Zambian copper to the Port of Dar es salaam. The railway faced various operational difficulties since its incorporation and has always struggled to make a profit, however, in recent years both countries have stepped up efforts to ensure the sustainability of the company.

On 26 February 2026, in a meeting led by Mahmoud Thabit Kombo of Tanzania's Ministry of Foreign Affairs and East African Cooperation, and Mulambo Haimbe of Zambia, five of the ten non-tariff barriers causing traffic congestion at the Tunduma and Nakonde border have been resolved. In addition, the two countries agreed to integrate Tanzania Customs Integrated System (TANCIS) and Zambia's Automated System for Customs Data Plus (ASYCUDA) for transparency.

== Diplomatic missions ==
Tanzania maintains an embassy in Lusaka and Zambia maintains an embassy in Dar es Salaam.

== State visits ==
- 24 February 2015 – Jakaya Kikwete makes a two-day state visit to Lusaka, where he held closed door talks with Edgar Lungu.
- 27 November 2016 - Edgar Lungu made a two-day state visit to Dar-es-salaam, where he held bilateral talks with John Magufuli.
- 3 August 2022 - Hakainde Hichilema made a one-day state visit to Dar es Salaam, where he held bilateral talks with Samia Suluhu Hassan.
- 23 October 2023 - Samia Suluhu Hassan made a two-day state visit to Lusaka, where she held bilateral talks with Hakainde Hichilema.

== See also ==
- Foreign relations of Tanzania
- Foreign relations of Zambia
