= Malawi–Zambia relations =

- Malawi: Zambia

Malawi and Zambia have had a close history for a long time. They share common values, history, language, culture, and border. They were part of one country as Northern Rhodesia and Nyasaland, along with Zimbabwe (formerly Southern Rhodesia), under the Federation of Rhodesia and Nyasaland.

Malawi has a large Zambian diaspora and Zambia has a large Malawian diaspora. Both countries are members of the Commonwealth of Nations.

== Joint Permanent Commission of Cooperation (JPCC) ==
This agreement was signed in 1982 to ensure continued cooperation between the two countries. They have a JPCC that meets alternately between the two countries every two years. They discuss issues of mutual concern including security.

== Shire Zambezi Waterway ==
Malawi, Zambia and Mozambique agreed to cooperate in the development of the Shire Zambezi Waterway, to allow for the transportation of goods in the area, and promote trade. It would benefit Malawi and Zambia by reducing the transportation costs since they are landlocked.

== People ==
- Rupiah Banda, the fourth President of Zambia who ruled from 2008 to 2011, was said to have been of Malawian descent.
