= Itezhi-Tezhi =

- City
- Location within Zambia
- Coordinates: 15°44′38″S 26°01′14″E
- Country: Zambia
- Province: Southern Province
- District: Itezhi-Tezhi District
- Time zone: UTC+2 (CAT)

Itezhi-Tezhi is a small town in the Southern Province of Zambia. It is the seat of the Itezhi-Tezhi District. It lies west of the town of Namwala on the border of the Kafue National Park.

On 6 February 2012, President Michael Sata issued a directive to try to move Itezhi-Tezhi from Southern Province to Central Province which was rejected by the people of Southern Province. The move to Central Province still happened. On 17 November 2021, President Hakainde Hichilema returned Itezhi-Tezhi to Southern Province.

Itezhi-Tezhi came into existence when the Itezhi-Tezhi Dam was constructed on the Kafue River in the early 1970s. The dam was created to hold and regulate the water flow in the river for Kafue Gorge Upper Power Station, downstream.

The town's estimated population is 4,000. The largest employer in the town is the electricity company ZESCO.
