= Zambia–Zimbabwe relations =

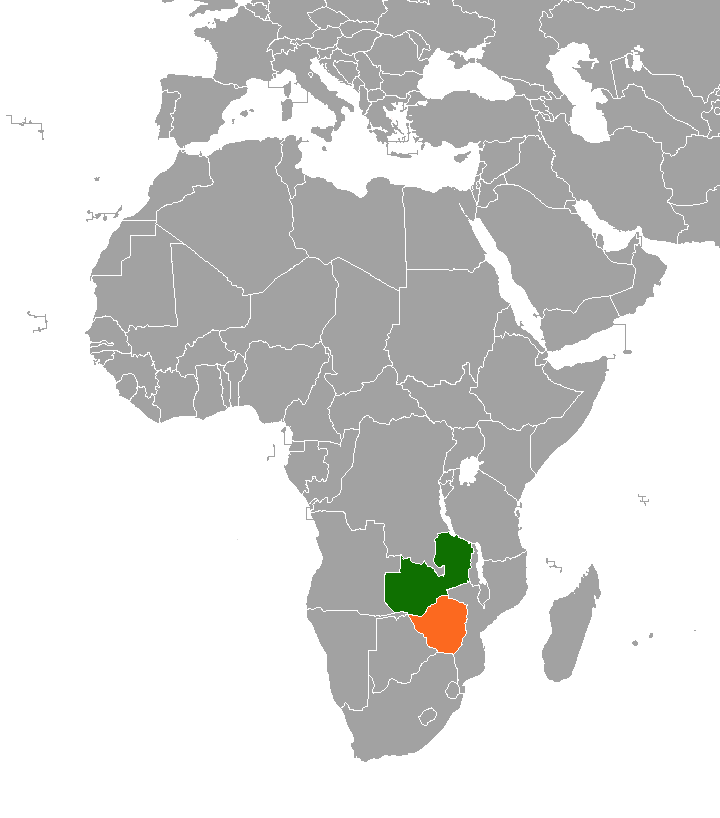

- Zambia: Zimbabwe

Zambia–Zimbabwe relations are bilateral relations between Zambia and Zimbabwe, two neighbouring states in Southern Africa. Both countries are members of the Southern African Development Community and the African Union.

== History ==
From 1953 to 1963 they were, along with Nyasaland (now Malawi) part of the Federation of Rhodesia and Nyasaland.

Initially the two countries had good relations after gaining independence. However, relations became strained in 2008 as Zambia, like Botswana, reported similar 'smear campaigns' against the Zambian government by Zimbabwe's state owned media, claiming it was "hired by Britain to press for a speedy regime change in Harare." The foreign affairs minister, Kabinga Pande, said it had lodged a protest against Zimbabwe, against the "sustained malicious campaign against Zambia."

Following the controversial Zimbabwean presidential election of 2008, Zambian President Levy Mwanawasa described Robert Mugabe's Zimbabwe as a "regional embarrassment". Post-2008, tensions thawed with Michael Sata affectionately referring to Mugabe as "Sekuru" in 2013 at a UNWTO event hosted in Victoria Falls.

== Trade ==
In 2010, Zambia's exports to Zimbabwe amounted to US$1.3 billion, while Zimbabwe's exports to Zambia totalled US$486 million. In March 2017, Zambia and Zimbabwe relaunched the Kavango-Zambezi Transfrontier Conservation Area (KAZA) Univisa, a joint visa scheme allowing eligible international tourists to travel between the two countries using a single visa.

== See also ==
- Foreign relations of Zambia
- Foreign relations of Zimbabwe
