= Edgar Lungu =

President of Zambia from 2015 to 2021 (1956–2025)

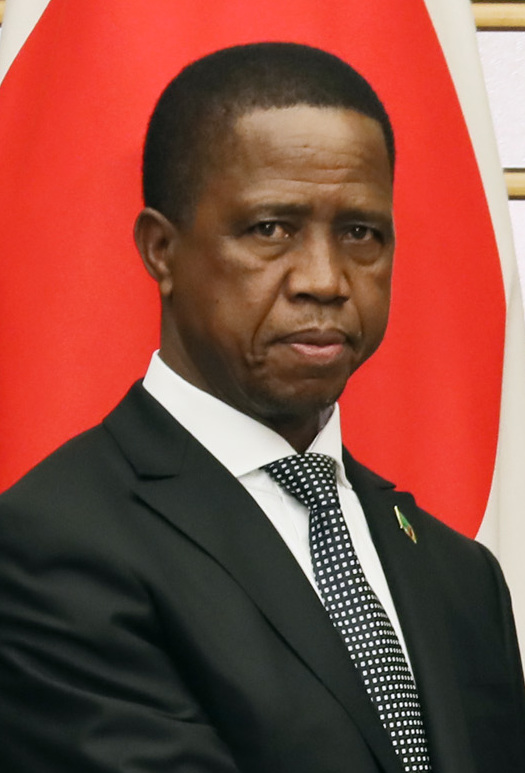
- Lungu in 2018

6th President of Zambia
- In office 26 January 2015 – 24 August 2021
- Vice President: Inonge Wina
- Preceded by: Guy Scott (acting)
- Succeeded by: Hakainde Hichilema

Chairman of the Patriotic Front
- In office 30 November 2014 – 28 August 2021
- Preceded by: Michael Sata
- Succeeded by: Given Lubinda (Acting)

Minister of Defence of Zambia
- In office 23 December 2013 – 25 January 2015
- President: Michael Sata; Guy Scott
- Preceded by: Geoffrey Bwalya Mwamba
- Succeeded by: Davies Chama

Member of the National Assembly for Chawama
- In office September 2011 – 25 January 2015
- Preceded by: Violet Sampa-Bredt
- Succeeded by: Lawrence Sichalwe

Personal details
- Born: Edgar Chagwa Lungu; 11 November 1956 Ndola, Loangwa, Northern Rhodesia, Federation of Rhodesia and Nyasaland (present-day Copperbelt Province, Zambia)
- Died: 5 June 2025 (aged 68) Pretoria, South Africa
- Party: UPND (1998–2001); Patriotic Front (2001–2025)
- Spouse: Esther Lungu (m. 1986)
- Children: 6
- Education: University of Zambia

Edgar Chagwa Lungu (11 November 1956 – 5 June 2025) was a Zambian politician who served as the sixth president of Zambia from 26 January 2015 to 24 August 2021.

Under President Michael Sata, Lungu served as Minister of Justice and Minister of Defence. Following Sata's death in October 2014, Lungu was nominated as the candidate for the Patriotic Front at the Convention of the Patriotic Front which was held in Kabwe, for the January 2015 presidential by-election, which was to determine who would serve out the remainder of Sata's term. In the election, he narrowly defeated opposition candidate Hakainde Hichilema and took office on 25 January 2015.

Lungu was elected to a full presidential term in the August 2016 election, again narrowly defeating Hichilema. Hichilema initially disputed the election result and filed a case at the Constitutional Court to nullify the result. On 5 September, however, the court dismissed the case in Lungu's favour. Lungu was sworn in for his first full term on 13 September 2016.

In the 2021 Zambian general election 2021, Lungu was defeated by Hichilema. He announced his retirement from politics, but returned in 2023 and became the leader of the Patriotic Front. He died in June 2025 in Pretoria, South Africa following surgery complications.

== Early life and law career ==
Lungu was born 11 November 1956 at Ndola Central Hospital. After graduating with a LL.B. in 1981 from the University of Zambia, he joined the law firm Andrea Masiye and Company in Lusaka. He subsequently underwent military officer training at Miltez in Kabwe under Zambia National Service (ZNS). He then returned to practising law, and later entered politics.

In 2010, Lungu had his law practising licence suspended by the Law Association of Zambia after being found guilty of professional misconduct.

== Political career ==
Lungu stood as an independent candidate in the Chawama constituency at the 1996 general election, with Christon Tembo of the MMD winning the seat ahead of him. After the formation of the United Party for National Development in December 1998, Lungu joined that party.

After the formation of the Patriotic Front in 2001, Lungu joined that party and stood in Chawama constituency at the 2001 general election as the Patriotic Front's candidate, where he finished seventh in a field of eleven candidates with 2.43% of the vote.

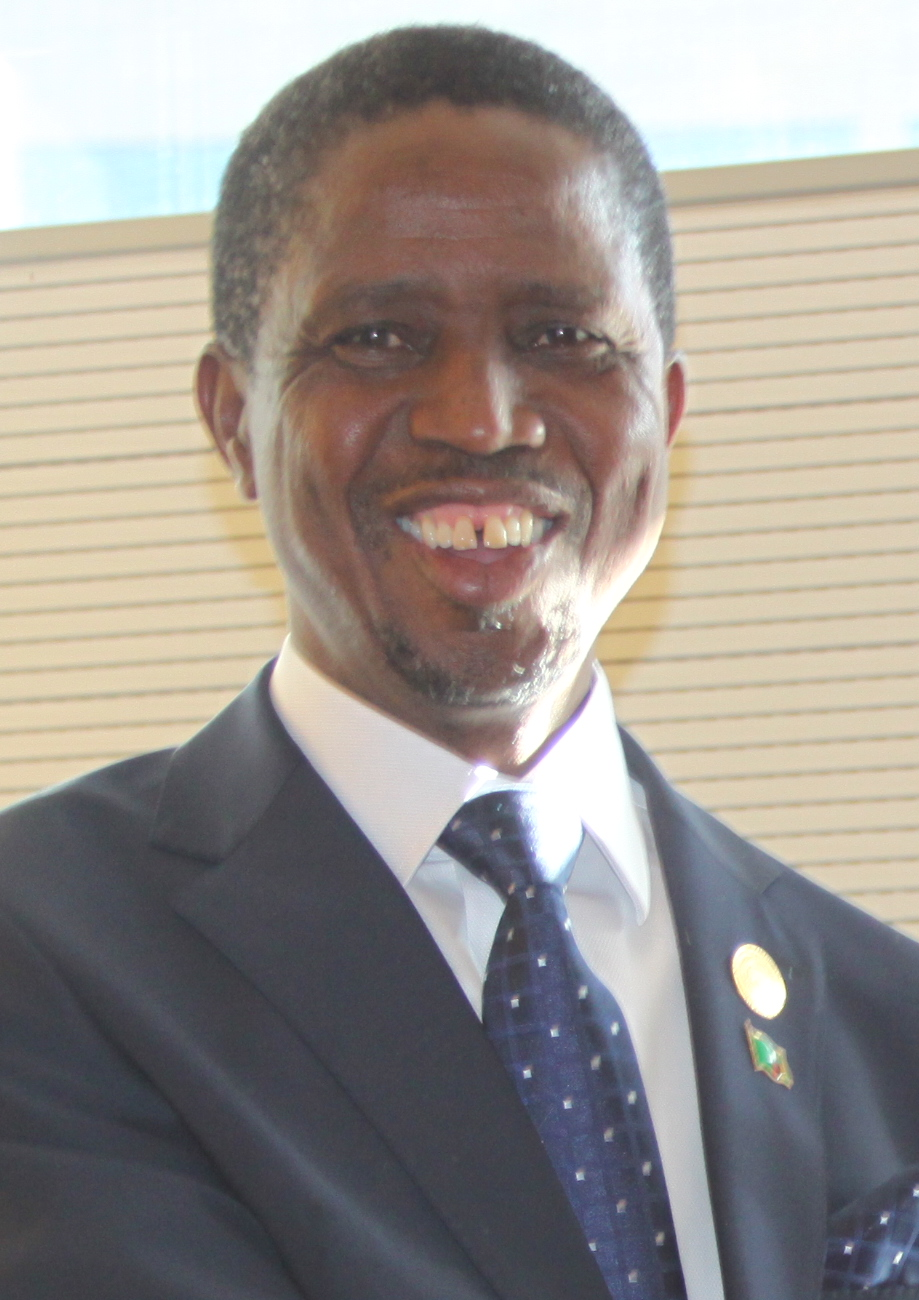
Edgar Lungu in January 2015

At the 2011 general election, Lungu once again stood as the Patriotic Front candidate for the Chawama constituency and won the parliamentary seat. After the PF won that 2011 election, Lungu became Junior Minister in the Vice-President's office. He was subsequently promoted to Minister of Home Affairs on 9 July 2012. He became Minister of Defence on 24 December 2013 after Geoffrey Bwalya Mwamba resigned from his ministerial post, and he functioned as Acting President during President Michael Sata's long-term illness in 2013–14. He has also held a string of central positions in his party, including Chair of the PF Central Committee on Discipline, and he became PF Secretary General and Minister of Justice on 28 August 2014 to replace Wynter Kabimba, who was fired.

Sata went abroad for medical treatment on 19 October 2014, leaving Lungu in charge of the country in his absence. Sata died on 28 October 2014. Vice-President Dr. Guy Scott took over as Acting President, and Lungu was viewed as one of the main contenders to ultimately succeed Sata in a presidential by-election. This was because Scott was ineligible to stand for election due to his parents not being born in Zambia.

On 3 November 2014, Acting President Dr. Guy Scott dismissed Lungu as Secretary-General of the PF. He replaced him with Davis Mwila, the Member of Parliament for Chipili. The next day, Scott reinstated Lungu. On 30 November, Lungu was elected as President of the Patriotic Front at a national convention of the party held in Kabwe. However, the convention was unusual because no voting took place. Instead, the unaccredited delegates elected him by raising hands.

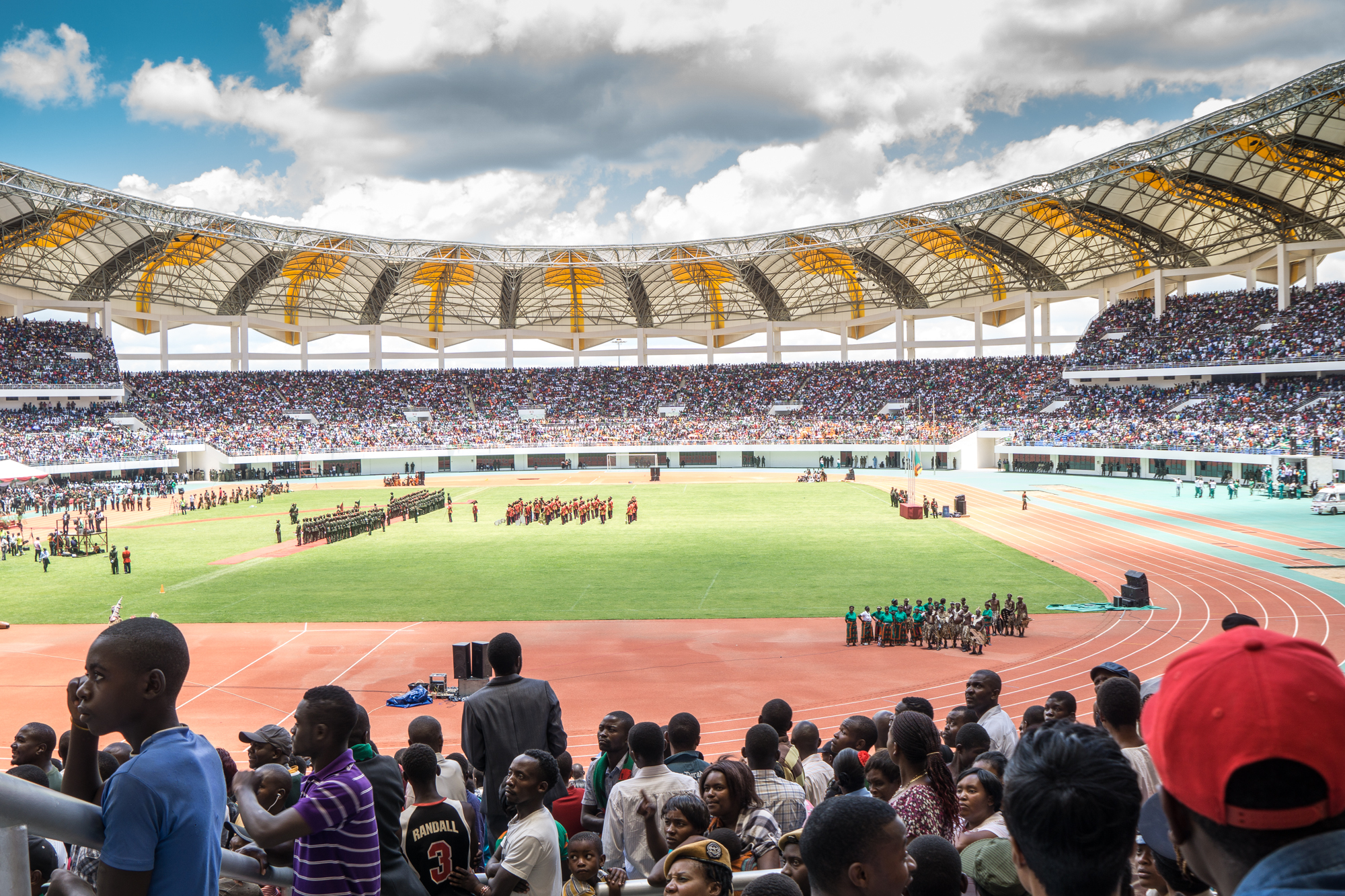
View of the crowd at the inauguration ceremony

On 20 January 2015, Lungu contested the presidential by-election and beat his closest rival Hakainde Hichilema of the United Party for National Development by a narrow majority of just 27,757 votes (1.66%), with just 32.36% of the registered electorate participating. He was declared the winner by the Electoral Commission of Zambia on 24 January.

=== Finishing Sata's term (2015–2016) ===
Lungu was sworn in as President of Zambia on 26 January 2015 at the National Heroes Stadium in the capital Lusaka. The following month, Lungu forced the head of the central bank out of office and promised lower interest rates. He appointed Inonge Wina as Zambia's first female Vice-President.

In March 2015 Lungu collapsed while holding a speech commemorating International Women's Day in Lusaka. After spending a short while in a Zambian hospital he had an operation for his narrowed oesophagus in Pretoria, South Africa. Lungu commuted the death sentences of 332 prisoners to life in prison on 16 July 2015 and condemned the massive overcrowding at the Mukobeko prison, calling it "an affront to basic human dignity".

In October 2015, Lungu ordered a national day of prayer in hopes of preventing further damage to the economy. Top religious and political officials participated, and other public events were cancelled. 18 October was officially registered as an annual public holiday in Zambia named the National Day of Prayer, Fasting, Repentance and Reconciliation. Questions were raised about the freedom of journalists under Lungu's presidency, though he denied his government had stopped any journalists from reporting on, or interviewing, him. Lungu appealed to the media to report "truthfully."

Lungu emphasized the diversification of Zambia's economy away from its decades-long dependence on copper mining, towards agriculture and other sectors, and sought investors for its energy sector—declaring it was not safe to depend on hydro-electricity, and that climate change created a need for alternative energy.

During his interim term, he met with French President François Hollande in France (early 2016), and with Pope Francis in the Vatican (calling it an "experience of a lifetime").

=== First full term (2016–2021) ===
Lungu ran for a full term in the August 2016 presidential election, which turned out to be a rematch of the 2015 presidential election between Lungu and UPND candidate Hakainde Hichilema. Lungu won the election with 50.32% of the vote, just a few thousand votes over the threshold for avoiding a run-off. He also increased his margin of victory over Hichilema to 100,530 votes or 2.72%. Hichilema refused to concede defeat after the announcement of official results and filed a petition before the Constitutional Court, asking for the results to be nullified due to irregularities. The court dismissed the case on 5 September 2016 and Lungu was inaugurated for a full five-year term of office on 13 September.

In December 2019, Lungu expressed anti-LGBT rhetoric, stating "Even animals don't do it, so why should we be forced to do it?... because we want to be seen to be smart, civilised and advanced and so on".

In December 2019, Lungu fired his controversial political advisor, Kaizer Zulu and replaced him with Zumani Zimba.

Lungu once again stood as the Patriotic Front candidate at the August 2021 general election. He lost the election to his closest rival, Hakainde Hichilema of the United Party for National Development, getting almost a million fewer votes than Hichilema. Lungu conceded defeat as Hichilema was declared the winner on 16 August 2021 by the Electoral Commission of Zambia.

== Post-presidency ==
After the 2021 election, Edgar Lungu decided to retire from active politics, leaving Given Lubinda as the Patriotic Front's acting president. On 3 May 2023, police surrounded Lungu's residence in Lusaka and demanded access to search it. His lawyer said that police were conducting a search following a complaint against his wife over her suspicious ownership of the vehicles and a title deed.

=== Return to Patriotic Front presidency ===
Lungu made an official announcement of him returning to active politics on 28 October 2023, returning to being the leader of the Patriotic Front. However, there was a controversial extraordinary general conference that had taken place earlier that October in which Miles Sampa was declared the president of the Patriotic Front (PF) party, defeating 7 other aspirants for the same position. Emmanuel Mwamba (the PF Information and Publicity Chairperson) argued that that convention was illegal and that the convention that took place was contrary to the party's outlined procedures in its constitution. That convention left the PF party divided and the matter was soon taken to the Lusaka High Court. Therefore, the Patriotic Front party consisted of two factions, one with Miles Sampa as the leader and one with Given Lubinda as the leader. After Lubinda gave back the PF presidential title to Lungu (thereby demoting himself to vice-president), the party remained with two factions (with Sampa as the leader of the other one).

As the leader of one of the two factions of the PF, Lungu decided to join the United Kwacha Alliance (UKA), an alliance of opposition political parties in Zambia, in early 2024. On top of this battle with Miles Sampa over who was the rightful PF leader, there was an ongoing and contentious issue of the Presidential eligibility of Lungu because he had previously been elected twice (in January 2015 and August 2016) to be the president of Zambia. A decision was made in July 2024 to have a full trial over the matter. The Constitutional Court decided that it would issue its ruling on 10 December 2024 in the case of Lungu's presidential eligibility.

In November 2024, Lungu's PF faction was invited to join the Tonse Alliance and it accepted, with Lungu being appointed the alliance chairperson and being chosen as the presidential candidate for the alliance for the 2026 general election. Due to UKA not being in support of a political party belonging to more than one alliance, it was decided that Lungu and the PF were no-longer part of UKA. Due to internal divisions within the PF, the Tonse Alliance decided that it would field candidates in any upcoming elections under the New Congress Party (NCP), including the 2026 general election where they planned to register Lungu as their presidential candidate.

On 10 December 2024, the Constitutional Court barred Lungu from running again for president as he had already served a maximum of two terms. Despite this ruling, Lungu remained the president of his Patriotic Front faction and the alliance chairperson of the Tonse Alliance. In March 2025, the Tonse Alliance spokesperson, Sean Tembo, decided to petition the Constitutional Court over this decision.

On 1 May 2025, Miles Sampa decided to reunite his Patriotic Front faction with the faction for Lungu, effectively stepping down from the party presidency. Lungu was handed back the party presidency and Given Lubinda was handed back the party vice-presidency (and therefore was acting president in Lungu's absence).

== Personal life and death ==
Lungu married Esther Lungu in 1986 and had six children, including Tasila Lungu, the Member of Parliament (MP) for Chawama (elected in 2021). He and his family were practising Baptists.

In 2015, it was disclosed that Lungu was being treated outside of Zambia for achalasia. In June 2021, he collapsed during a televised military event due to a hypoglycaemic attack, a complication of achalasia.

In early 2025, Lungu travelled to South Africa to receive specialised treatment for an undisclosed illness. By May 2025, it was reported that his condition was steady despite rumours about his ailing health. On the morning of 5 June 2025, Lungu died after suffering cardiac complications from a surgery he was undergoing at the Mediclinic Medforum in Pretoria, South Africa. He was 68 years old. The Zambian government declared seven days of mourning, with flags flown at half-mast, while Mozambique declared three days of mourning.

Lungu's family and the Patriotic Front rejected the Hichilema government's offer to have Lungu's remains repatriated from South Africa and be accorded a state funeral, with his family adding that Lungu had instructed that President Hichilema not be let near his body. Following negotiations, the Lungu family agreed to have Hichilema preside over a state funeral to be held on 22 June. The repatriation was again delayed on 18 June after the Lungu family accused the government of violating the agreed terms. The family announced on 20 June that the burial will take place in South Africa. On 25 June, the burial, which had been scheduled on that day, was suspended after the Pretoria High Court granted a request by the Zambian government to postpone the event pending a final decision on the location.

On 8 August, the Pretoria High Court ordered Lungu's family to repatriate his remains to Zambia and allow the government to hold a state funeral for him. However, within a few hours, Lungu's family applied for leave to appeal, challenging the order issued by the judge, which effectively halted the repatriation.

In June 2026, the South African Supreme Court of Appeal overturned the High Court order allowing Lungu's family to decide on his burial.

== Books ==
Against All Odds, a biography of Lungu by the Zambian journalist and senior diplomat Anthony Mukwita, was published by Partridge Africa on 5 January 2017.

== Electoral history ==
Electoral history of Edgar Lungu
Year	Office	Party	Votes received				Result
Year	Office	Party	Total	%	P.	Swing	Result
2015	President of Zambia	PF	807,925	48.84%	1st	—N/a	Won
2016	President of Zambia	PF	1,860,877	50.35%	1st	+1.51	Won
2021	President of Zambia	PF	1,870,780	38.71%	2nd	-11.64	Lost

== See also ==
- List of international presidential trips made by Edgar Lungu

Political offices
Preceded by Guy Scott; Acting	President of Zambia; 2015–2021	Succeeded by Hakainde Hichilema
