= China–Zambia relations =

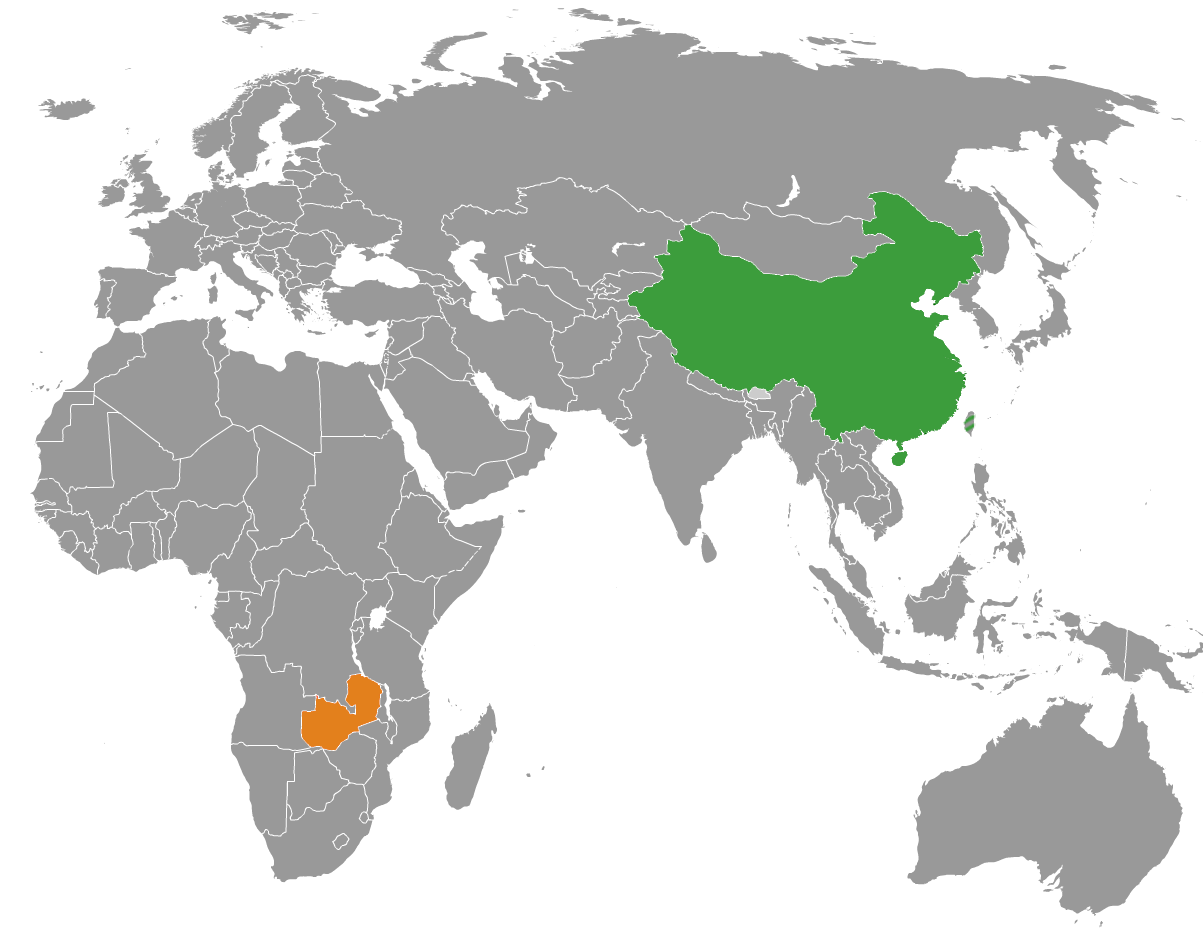
- China: Zambia

China–Zambia relations refers to the current and historical relationship between the People's Republic of China (PRC) and Zambia.

== Historical relations ==
The relationship between Zambia and China was established after the independence of Zambia on October 29, 1964. China supported the independence of Zambia through financial and material support.

The first phase of the relationship emphasizes the acquisition of political freedom from occupying colonial forces and promoting diplomatic relationships with China. Zambia, after gaining political freedom in 1964, was supported by China through economic support and infrastructural buildout. The Zambian government began to invest in transportation infrastructure, to help the economic growth of the country and support political freedom movements in the region of the Southern African Development Community. China considered the infrastructural development of the railway link as an opportunity to strengthen ties with Zambia. In this regard, the former president of Zambia (Kenneth Kaunda) visited China in 1967 for the finalisation of the railway project and with the approval of the parties involved. This reflects a wider interest of China during this period, in which it began its planning to aid African countries with infrastructural development and political support.

The second phase of the Zambian-Sino relationship from 1979 to 1999 saw significant economic and political changes in the African continent. Zambia in the early 1990s, implemented a multiparty democratic system whereas in China there was a recovery period from economic and social challenges due to the Cultural Revolution, followed by the Open-Door Policies of Deng Xiaoping. In 1999, China introduced the Go Out policy which impacted its relations with several African countries. China at this stage emphasised significant economic transformation from the old, planned economy towards a more open market economy. Although the association between China and Zambia during this period remained primarily political, the trend of increasing investment could already be seen.

The third phase of the Chinese and Zambian relationship, (1999–present day), is characterised by strengthening policy of promoting sustainable economic development. The government of Zambia has focused on key social policy areas such as promoting regional peace and poverty alleviation. In 2000, the Forum on China–Africa Cooperation was created to promote a new relationship between China and Zambia. This forum aimed to facilitate and promote cultural exchange, economic cooperation, joint trust, and political equivalence to drive the relationship. This has worked to deepen diplomatic ties between the two nations.

== Economic relations ==
Zambia joined the Belt and Road Initiative (BRI) in 2018.

=== Sino-Zambian trade relations ===
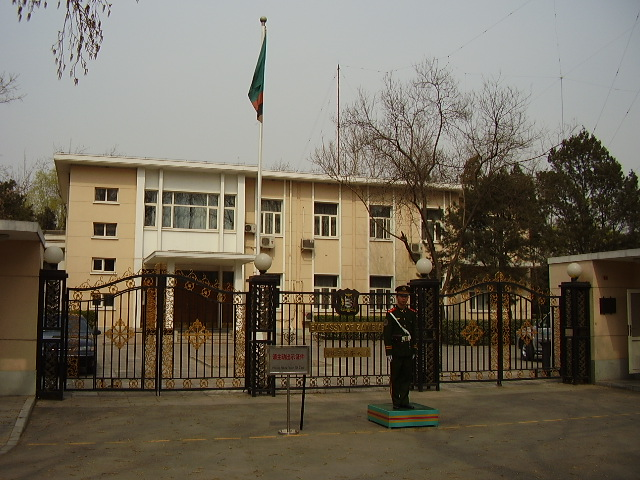
Embassy of Zambia in China

After recognising the People's Republic of China (PRC) just after 5 days following its establishment in 1949, Zambia has been one of China's oldest diplomatic partners. This is particularly visible in the extensive trade relations between the two countries. Zambia is rich in primary resources, with exports to China consisting mostly of raw materials, key to the upkeep of China's growing economic ambitions.

As of August 2022, Chinese exports to Zambia amounted to $92.6M, while Zambian exports to the PRC reached $513M. This meant a negative trade balance of $421M from China's perspective.

The top Chinese export products were delivery trucks ($7.68M), while tractors, steel bars and semiconductor devices were among the most popular Chinese exports towards Zambia. On the other hand, China imported mostly raw materials from Zambia, mainly raw copper ($419M), and additional primary resources such as refined copper, nickel ore, raw tobacco, or copper ore.

In the one-year period between August 2021 and August 2022, Zambian imports from China increased by $31.5M, amounting to a 51.6% rise, while Zambian exports increased by $206M, or a 67.2% growth.

Main Chinese export regions to Zambia include the Shandong, Jiangsu, Beijing, Guangdong, and Zhejiang Provinces, while the main import destinations of Zambian products are Jiangxi, Shandong, Guangdong, Fujian and Anhui Provinces.

As of 2022, the export of services is absent between the two countries.

After being key trading partners for decades, the bilateral relationship culminated on 28 September 2022, at the first China-Zambia Investment Forum. The forum concluded with parties agreeing on deepening both trade and investment relations and tightening practical cooperation. Further discussions included Zambia's inclusion in the China-led Belt and Road Initiative and the duty-free treatment of Zambian products.

In 1998 China Non-Ferrous Metals Corporation (CNMC) bought a controlling 85 percent stake in Zambia's Chambishi copper mine for US$20 million ($27 million in adjusted for inflation in 2011) and invested a further US$130 million in rehabilitating the mine. Less than ten years later by the end of 2005, roughly 160 Chinese companies had invested in Zambia.

Trade between China and Zambia in 2022 is US$5.884 billion. Chinese investments in Zambia range from mining interests in Zambia's copper belt to investments in agriculture, manufacturing, and tourism.

Academic Ching Kwang Lee's analysis of Chinese capital in Zambia contends that it is more adaptable and responsive to local Zamibian needs than Western capital, which tends to take more uncompromising positions.

=== Chinese development finance to Zambia ===
China's Belt and Road initiative has financed hundreds of infrastructure projects in dozens of countries, including Zambia. Chinese project loans often come in the form of build-operate-transfer (BOT), resulting in Chinese or joint management of specific projects, although there is usually never a complete take-over of institutions. In Zambia, this is the case for the hydropower projects with ZESCO, the digitalisation of the broadcasting service ZNBC, and two airports.

Chinese capital investments and loans have faced claims of lacking substantial assessment and affordability guidelines. It has been claimed that the repayment capabilities and the credible social benefits of some projects to the Zambian public have failed to be evaluated by Chinese financiers, ultimately contributing to Zambian debt accumulation. As a result of the BOT model and a lack of thorough assessments on Zambia's debt repayment capabilities, Zambia is suffering a sovereign-debt crisis, with China as its largest creditor at $6 billion.

From 2000 to 2011, there are approximately 64 Chinese official development finance projects identified in Zambia through various media reports. These projects range from a loan to fund Kafue Gorge Lower power project, to a loan for expanding the Kariba North bank power station near Siavonga, or US$211 million for debt relief in 2006.

== Military relations ==
China has provided military aid to Zambia, including equipment and training programs. Cooperation includes defense agreements and exchanges, strengthening Zambia's security sector.

== Sino-Zambian infrastructure projects ==
=== Zambian domestic policy ===
The Zambian government has entered into several joint-infrastructure ventures with China in a bid to bolster the country's power supply. This is required to meet President Hakainde Hichilema's goal of spurring economic growth by tripling national copper production to three million tonnes per year. As hydropower accounts for 85% of Zambia's electricity, ZESCO, Zambia's state-owned power utility, has partnered with SinoHydro, a state-run hydropower company in China, to expand Zambia's power grid.

=== The Kafue Gorge Lower Power Station ===
The largest venture between ZESCO and SinoHydro is the Kafue Gorge Lower Power Station (KGL), a hydroelectric dam along the Zambezi River near Zambia's southern border with Zimbabwe. The KGL is projected to generate 750 megawatts of power in addition to the 900 megawatts generated by the ageing Kafue Gorge Upper Station (KGU). The KGL is estimated to cost US$2 billion, 85% ($1.7 billion) of which is being funded by China's Export-Import and Industrial and Commercial Banks (EximBank & ICBC). The Zambian government agreed to cover the remaining 15% (US$300 million).

The KGL was considered a flagship project between Zambia and China, with many hoping it would kickstart the former's infrastructure development. The KGL would be the first major hydroelectric project in Zambia since the construction of the KGU in 1973 with the potential to turn Zambia into a net exporter of electricity.

The KGL has faced several delays in its construction. Originally planned to be operational by 2020, the project stalled amidst concerns about Zambia and ZESCO's ability to fulfil their debt obligations to China's EximBank and ICBC. Consequently, SinoHydro refused to hand over full control of the facility to ZESCO as planned in 2021 and Sinosure, the Chinese state-owned insurer of the project, refused to provide further loans for the KGL.

The U.S. and IMF have also criticised the KGL for its uneven distribution of debt. $3.1 billion, one-third of the country's US$9.7 billion in debt, is owed to China, raising concerns Zambia will have to yield control of ZESCO to China. Amos Chanda, a spokesman for the Zambian President, refuted such claims by U.S. National Security Advisor John Bolton in 2018, stating ZESCO is by no means collateral for Zambia's debt to China. Nonetheless, many remain critical of ZESCO's borrowing practices, citing associated debt as a potential risk to Zambian sovereignty.

== Political issues ==
Zambia follows the one China principle. It recognizes the People's Republic of China as the sole government of China and Taiwan as an integral part of China's territory, and supports all efforts by the PRC to "achieve national reunification". It also considers Hong Kong, Xinjiang and Tibet to be China's internal affairs.

In July 2019, UN ambassadors of 37 countries, including Zambia, signed a joint letter to the United Nations Human Rights Council defending China's persecution of Uyghurs. Zambia was one of 16 countries that defended China in 2019 but did not do so in 2020. In June 2020, Zambia was one of 53 countries that backed the Hong Kong national security law at the United Nations.

In May 2026, the RightsCon annual conference, scheduled to take place in Zambia, was cancelled due to pressure from the Chinese government. The conference's sponsor, Access Now, wrote that it was "told that diplomats from the People's Republic of China (PRC) were putting pressure on the Government of Zambia because Taiwanese civil society participants were planning to join us in person."

== Controversies ==
=== Sino-Zambian social relations ===
High numbers of Chinese immigrants, with more than 3,000 in the late 1990s to 20,000 in 2017, have been accompanied by increasing interest and investments from China into Zambia since the turn of the century.

The People's Republic of China have been criticised heavily by much of the Zambian population for their involvement. They see this continued engagement has been mostly negative for Zambia, and has caused aid dependency, fuelled corruption, and caused economic disparities.

The 2006 presidential election showed a good representation of the anti-Chinese sentiment in Zambia, with political figure Sata (who then became president later in 2011) gaining a lot of popularity using his anti-PRC rhetoric as his main approach.

=== Zambian debt crisis ===
Zambia's external public debt has risen dramatically in recent years, particularly since 2012, and is now above 100% of GDP. As of 2017, China owned $5.5 billion of Zambia's $17.3 billion debt, while the rest is owed to other rich countries and Western-dominated international institutions, including the development banks and the commercial Eurobond market. Zambia has borrowed from China to build infrastructure (roads, energy, railways, telecommunications) and two state-of-the-art international airports post-2000.

Due to the centralization of economic decision-making in the presidency, there is an absence of publicly available information on the loans from Beijing as well as the absence of adequate management systems. This has raised concerns that Zambian officials may inflate project costs and receive bribes.

Between 2002 and 2008, the value of Zambia's mineral exports grew 500%. However, this did not increase Zambia's tax revenue due to international tax laws permitting offshore tax breaks for Western and Indian commodity giants under IMF recommendation. Therefore, despite the rising prices of copper, the Zambian government has ceased to tax its mining companies due to privatization and trade liberalization policies of state-owned companies attached to the IMF debt relief package in the late 1990s.

=== Collum and Combishi Mines ===
In February 2010 a Chinese supervisor, Zhong Tinghui, was killed at the privately owned Collum Coal Mine. In October that year, two Chinese managers opened fire on African mine workers during a riot at the mine and injured 11. In early August 2012 Chinese mine manager, Wu Shengzai, was killed following a pay dispute.

Fifty-one employees at a Chinese-owned explosives plant were killed in an explosion in April 2005. The following year a riot broke out at the Chambishi mine. The next day a Zambian worker was shot and wounded leading to the storming of the Chinese residential compound and another five workers were shot and wounded by a panicked Chinese manager. The explosion at the explosives plant and the events at Chambishi mine became one of biggest issues in the 2006 Zambian presidential elections. With opposition candidate Michael Sata taking an anti-PRC stance, stating that were he to win the election, he would renounce Zambia's recognition of the PRC and recognize the Republic of China in Taiwan. Sata lost the election to then-incumbent president Levy Mwanawasa.

In February 2007 the Chinese government sought to mitigate anti-PRC feeling in Chambishi by promising to invest US$800 million into the creation of a China-Zambian economic zone and help the country to industrialize.

=== 2025 Sino-Metals Leach Zambia dam disaster ===
On 18 February 2025, a tailings dam at the Chinese state-owned Sino-Metals Leach Zambia mine collapsed, spilling 50 million liters of acidic waste into a tributary of the Kafue River, Zambia's most vital waterway. The spill led to mass fish deaths, destroyed crops, and disrupted water supplies for over 700,000 people in Kitwe. Zambia deployed the air force to neutralize the acid with lime, while Sino-Metals’ chairman apologized and pledged restoration efforts. The disaster intensified concerns over China's environmental impact in Zambia, where a 2025 Human Rights Watch report criticized Zambia for allowing Chinese and other companies to operate in lead-contaminated areas, endangering children's health. The company required a non-disclosure agreement for compensation claims.

== Cultural relations ==
China promotes cultural exchange through scholarships, language programs, and Confucius Institutes in Zambia.

== Bibliography ==
- Cardenal, Juan Pablo; Araújo, Heriberto (2011). La silenciosa conquista china (in Spanish). Barcelona: Crítica. pp. 194–201. ISBN 9788498922578.
