= Itezhi-Tezhi East =

National Assembly constituency in Zambia

Itezhi-Tezhi East is a constituency of the National Assembly of Zambia. It was created in 2026. It covers the eastern part of Itezhi-Tezhi District.

== List of MPs ==
Election year	MP	Party
2026	Credo Nanjuwa	United Party for National Development
