= Namibia–Zambia relations =

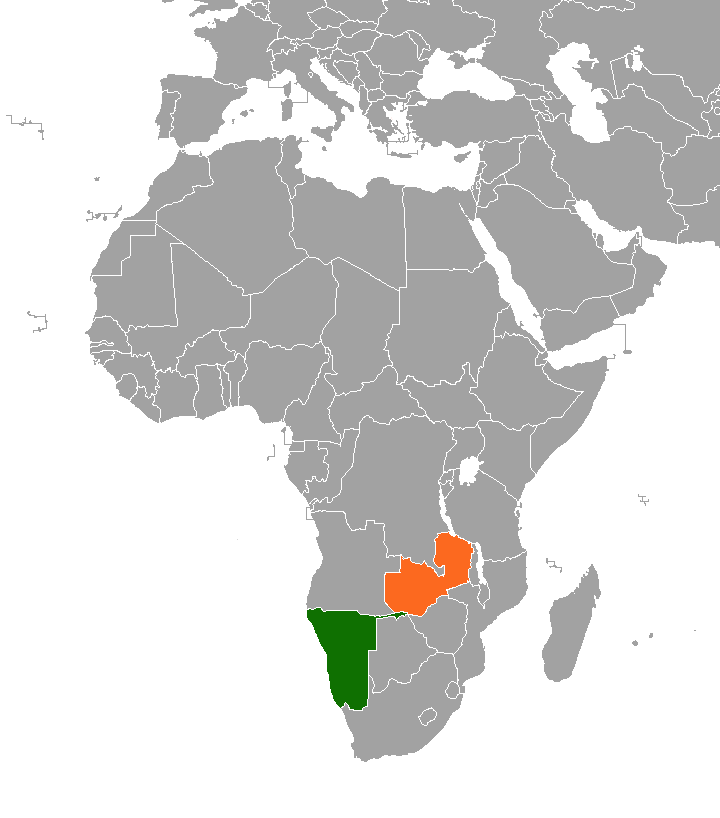
- Namibia: Zambia

Namibia–Zambia relations refers to the bilateral relations of Namibia and Zambia. Namibia and Zambia are separated by the Zambezi River. The Katima Mulilo Bridge connects Katima Mulilo on the Namibian side with Sesheke, Zambia. Both countries are members of the African Union and Non-Aligned Movement.

== History ==
=== Before Namibian independence (1880s-1990) ===
Zambia was known as Northern Rhodesia from 1911 to 1964. Namibia was known as German South-West Africa (1885–1915) and later as South-West Africa (1915–1989). Until 1964, both countries were ruled by white minorities, however, Northern Rhodesia gained independence in 1964, renaming itself Zambia. Subsequently, Zambia supported Namibian efforts towards independence from occupying South Africa. Namibia's primary liberation movement, SWAPO, was based from 1964 to 1975 out of Lusaka, Zambia's capital. The United Nations Institute for Namibia, which eventually became the University of Namibia, was based in Lusaka. SWAPO cadres received political and military training in the country. Upon independence in March 1990, Namibia and Zambia established diplomatic relations.

=== Since Namibian independence (1990) ===
Zambia recognized Namibia and both countries established relations in March 1990. Zambia has a High Commission in Windhoek. Namibia has a High Commission in Lusaka.

== Trade ==
From 2004 to 2006, trade increased between the two countries from US$15.1 million to US$17.2 million with a trade balance in Zambia's favour. In 2007, USAID supported increased trade relations between the two states.

In October 2022, Zambia and Namibia signed a memorandum of understanding (MoU) to build an oil and gas pipeline connecting the two countries. The MoU set the intention of the two Governments to support and facilitate the implementation of the private sector-led Namibia-Zambia Oil Products and Natural Gas Pipeline Project (NAZOP) that is envisioned to supply 100,000 to 120,000 barrels per day.

== High Commissioners ==
Namibia's High Commissioners to Zambia have included Martin Shalli and Commissioner Solomon Witbooi, who was appointed in April 2007. Past top Zambian diplomats in Namibia include Mavis Muyunda and Commissioner retired Zambia Army Commander General Isaac Chisuzi, who was appointed in December 2010.

== See also ==
- Foreign relations of Namibia
- Foreign relations of Zambia
