= South Africa–Zambia relations =

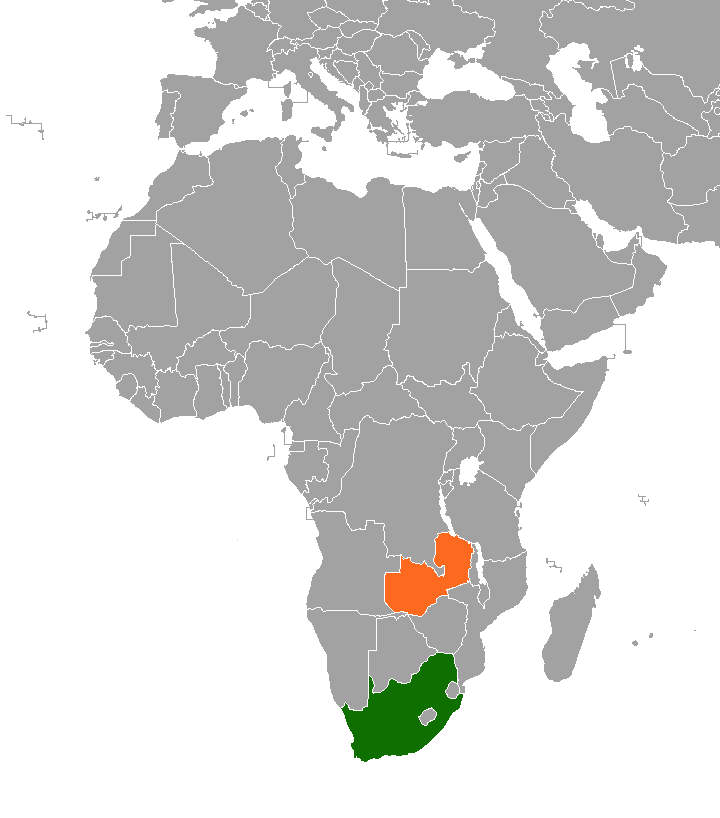
- South Africa: Zambia

South Africa–Zambia relations refers to the current and historical relationship between South Africa and Zambia. Both countries are members of the Southern African Development Community (SADC) and African Union.

== Historical relations ==
=== Pre-Apartheid ===
South Africa and Northern Rhodesia (Zambia) were part of the British Empire and shared common characteristics, including the settlement of Europeans and the dispossession of native Black Africans. The area brought into the Empire by the British South Africa Company led by Cecil Rhodes.

=== Apartheid-era ===
Zambia became independent in 1964 and, under President Kenneth Kaunda, the country actively supported the African National Congress and the South West Africa People's Organization, which fought the Namibian War of Independence against South African occupation in Namibia. In 1990, the ANC expressed "sincere gratitude to [Zambia] for their selfless support and involvement with us in the struggle...".

=== Post-apartheid ===
In the early 2000s, South African company Sun International invested US$ 56 million in Zambia to create the Zambezi Sun Hotel. In 2009, nearly 52% of all imports to Zambia were from South Africa. South Africa was the seventh largest exporter of Zambian goods at approximately 7%.

== Military relations ==
During apartheid, Zambia provided refuge and military training bases for South African liberation movements. Today, military cooperation is largely within the framework of Southern African Development Community peacekeeping initiatives.

== Economic relations ==
Trade between the two countries is significant, with South African businesses heavily invested in Zambia’s retail, mining, and banking sectors. However, reports highlight concerns over South African mining companies operating in lead-contaminated areas like Kabwe, where pollution remains a severe public health issue.
