= Itezhi-Tezhi District =

Coordinates: 15°36′S 25°55′E

- District
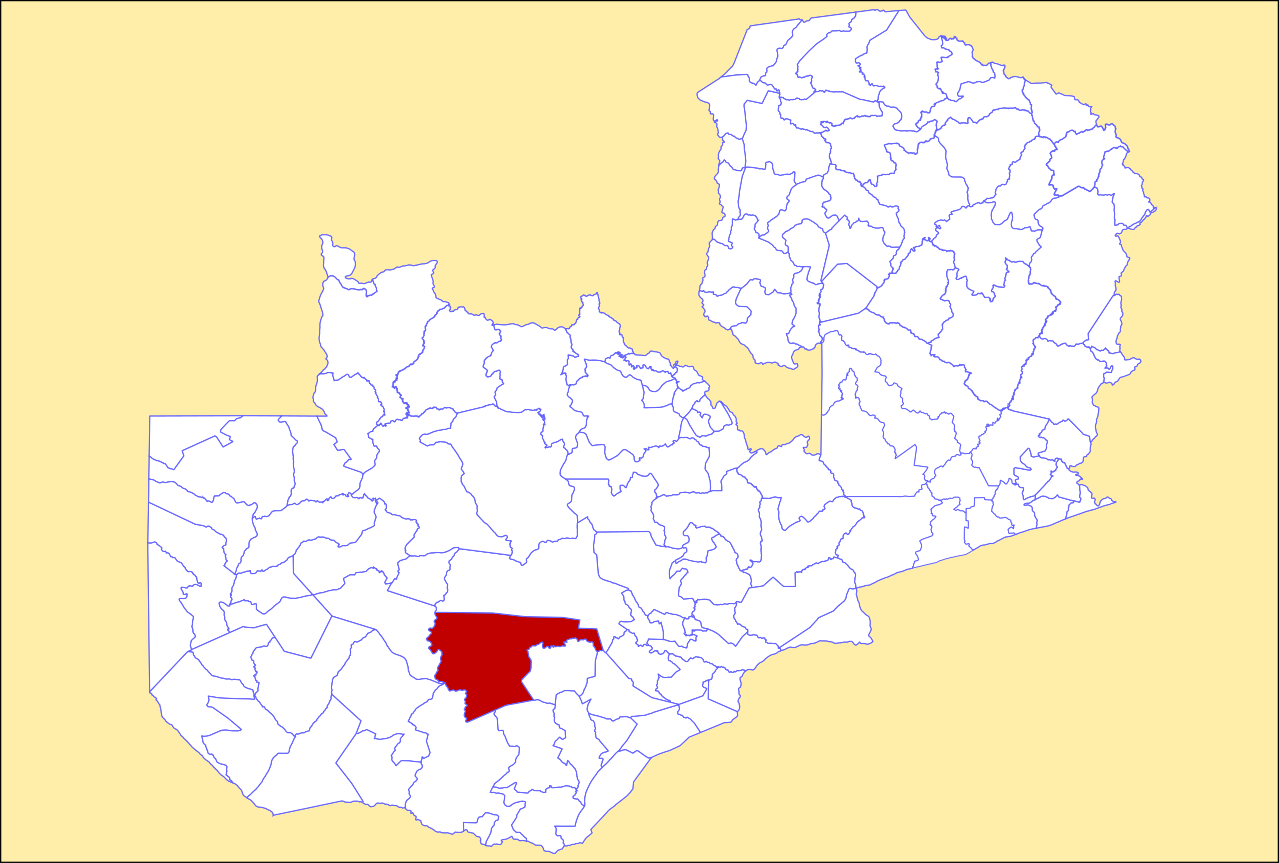
- District location in Zambia
- Country: Zambia
- Province: Southern Province
- Capital: Itezhi-Tezhi

Area
  - Total: 15,790.8 km^{2} (6,096.9 sq mi)

Population (2022)
  - Total: 130,216
  - Density: 8.24632/km^{2} (21.3579/sq mi)
- Time zone: UTC+2 (CAT)

Itezhi-Tezhi District is a district of Zambia, located in Southern Province. The capital lies at Itezhi-Tezhi. As of the 2022 Zambian Census, the district had a population of 130,216 people.

It was moved from Southern Province to Central Province by President Michael Sata in 2012 and later moved back to Southern Province by president Hakainde Hichilema in 2021.

== History ==
The district was created in September 1997 by subdividing Namwala District.

Before 2012, Itezhi-Tezhi was part of the Southern Province of Zambia. Then, President Michael Sata decided in 2012 to move Itezhi-Tezhi District from Southern Province to Central Province, against the wishes of the local residents.

Nine years later, on 17 November 2021, President Hakainde Hichilema announced his intention to reverse the move done by late former President Michael Sata. President Hichilema officially declared Itezhi-Tezhi as part of Southern Province (no-longer part of Central Province), thereby returning the district to its original province. This was agreed upon after an urgent request the previous month by the Chiefs of the area to return the district to its original province, where facilities are easier to reach (Southern Province's capital at Choma is only a road away while Central Province's capital at Kabwe is distant).
