= Water transport in Zambia =

Water transport and the many navigable inland waterways in Zambia have a long tradition of practical use except in parts of the south. Since draught animals such as oxen were not heavily used, water transport was usually the only alternative to going on foot until the 19th century. The history and current importance of Zambian waterways, as well as the types of indigenous boats used, provide information on this important aspect of the Zambian economy.

== Indigenous boats and traditional use of waterways ==
=== Dugout canoes ===
The techniques of making temporary boats or rafts by weaving together bundles of buoyant reeds were known to African people living near the many rivers, lakes, lagoons and swamps of what is now Zambia. The coming of the Iron Age introduced tools such as the adze which facilitates the construction of dugout canoes, especially from African teak (Pterocarpus angolensis or 'mulombwa' in Chibemba, 'mulombe' in Chilozi, 'mukwa' in Chishona) which has a long life even when constantly immersed. The dugout then took over as the principal means of fishing and travel by boat, whether paddled in deeper water, or punted in shallow water like makoros in neighbouring Botswana.

When explorer David Livingstone, the first European to see Lake Bangweulu, arrived on the western shore of that lake in 1868, he was conveyed across it efficiently in a dugout canoe 45 feet long and 4 feet wide (about 14 m by 1.2 m), paddled by six men. The people of the lake and its wetlands, which cover a completely flat area of more than 10,000 km^{2} in flood, have the ability to navigate unaided across open water or through mazes of swamp channels despite having no landmarks to guide them most of the time.

There is an account of the Shila people in the Luapula swamps in the 19th century hunting hippos with great skill by throwing harpoons at them from dugout canoes, despite being in great danger from these huge aggressive animals’ ability to overturn a canoe and virtually bite its paddlers in half, and they are responsible for many human deaths in Zambia.

Several dugout canoes may be lashed together and a timber platform built over them to carry heavy loads, and many early pontoon ferries were made in this way, such as the first ferry over the Luangwa River in 1929, which could carry a 1.5 ton truck. Paddled by a dozen men, the crossing used to take four to six hours, not because of the great width of the river but the need to go a long way upstream before the crossing, when the current would sweep the pontoon several kilometres downstream.

There are both permanent and seasonal fishing communities to which the only access is by boat or canoe, such as in Bangweulu and Mweru Wantipa in particular, but also along many rivers and lake shores. To such communities canoes and boats are a way of life. A colonial administrator in the 1920s saw a dugout canoe crossing Lake Tanganyika (35 km wide) which is large enough to have waves of around 1 m. Though such a feat was commonplace, he was astonished to discover that the three paddlers were all blind, and the boat was being steered by a small child to the store at Mpulungu so they could buy supplies.

=== Lozi timber plank boats ===
Before the coming of the Europeans from 1860 onwards, the Lozi people of Barotseland were building Nalikwanda royal barges made from teak planks fixed with iron nails (extensive Rhodesian Teak forests grew in the east of Barotseland). As seen in the Kuomboka ceremony these reached huge sizes, requiring a hundred paddlers or more. Although there has been speculation that the Lozi learnt this method of boat building from Arab or Portuguese traders, the Lozi did not allow such traders to enter their territory, and the traders certainly did not haul boats overland to central Africa with them. There is no evidence to suppose that the Lozi plank boat is anything other than an indigenous technology.

== Water transport in the colonial era ==
For about three decades after the start of the colonial era as North-Western and North-Eastern Rhodesia, there was no road transport in the territory, except by ox-wagon. Even when the first railway reached the Copperbelt in 1910, there was no mechanised road transport from that single line into the surrounding areas or the rest of the country. Water transport was used by colonial officials, businesses, and the few settlers, and some Africans made their living hiring out their canoes and labour to them.

The main waterways used in this way were:

=== Lake transport ===
1. Lake Tanganyika: the port of Mpulungu was one of the main entry points to the north of the territory until World War I, and even after remained a significant route with services by the MV Liemba connecting to the Kigoma-Dar es Salaam railway.
2. Lake Bangweulu and Bangweulu swamps: from Samfya and Nsombo to all parts of the system.
3. Lake Mweru: Nchelenge-Kashikishi to Kilwa Island, Chiengi and Pweto.

=== River and swamp channel transport ===
1. Zambezi River: Katombora Rapids to Sesheke and Katima Mulilo, just above which is a series of rapids over a distance of 20 km, and then the Ngonye Falls 75 km further on at Sioma. Depending on the water level, boats could be paddled or pulled through or carried around the rapids, and at Sioma, Chief Yeta had a team of 40 oxen available to pull barges 5 km over land around the Ngonye Falls.
2. Upper Zambezi between Ngonye Falls and the Nyamboma Rapids, and especially Mongu to Kalabo.
3. Kasenga (in DR Congo) and Kashiba, across from each other on the Luapula River, to Lake Mweru. From the 1930s to the 1950s most of the commercial fishing on the lake was run by Greek fishermen operating from Kasenga. The Belgian Congo government also operated a sternwheeler paddle steamer, the Charles Lemaire, on the Luapula and Lake Mweru.
4. Bangweulu Swamps: The hundreds of channels are often narrowed by shifting vegetation and not suitable for motorboats except those with outboard motors. Efforts have been made over the years to cut channels but they eventually become silted or overgrown with papyrus again. The main routes:

- Kapalala on the Luapula River to Chandesi on the Chambeshi River — this was the main route between the Copperbelt and the Northern Province until 1930. During the later stages of World War I, a fleet of 900 boats (mainly dugout canoes) ferried supplies over this route for British forces near Abercorn.
- Kapalala to Lake Bangweulu and Samfya/Nsombo.
- Chambeshi to Nsombo.

=== Other waterways, local use ===
- The Kafue River, though navigable between the town of Kafue and the Copperbelt was not used for that route because its meandering course which takes it far to the west makes the route three times longer than the straight-line distance, and it does not pass close to any areas with much population.
- Similarly the Luangwa River does not constitute a major waterway since it does not pass through any well-populated areas, and becomes very shallow in the dry season.
- Dongwe River and Kabompo River in the west
- Lungwebungu River in the west
- Luena-Luongo in the north
- Upper Kalungwishi River the north
- Lake Mweru Wantipa in the north
- Lukanga Swamp in the centre

== Boat operations in the present day ==
There is a need to develop inland waterways in Zambia but it is hampered by a lack of management know-how in the sector and a lack of port facilities. Development of the road network has reduced the demand for commercial boat services where road services compete. No major urban centres have developed on any waterways and so boat transport is not used for any urban or inter-urban travel. The only centres which can be considered to have commercial boat services are, in rough order of size:

=== Commercial operators ===
- Mpulungu, Lake Tanganyika, serving the Zambian shore and islands up to Nsumbu and Ndole Bay, with international services to Tanzania, DR Congo and Burundi.
- Samfya, Lake Bangweulu
- Nchelenge-Kashikishi, Lake Mweru (with international connections to DR Congo at Kilwa and Kasenga).
- Mongu, Zambezi River, especially to Kalabo.

=== Tourism operators ===
Boat operators serving the tourist trade are found in:

- Mpulungu on Lake Tanganyika
- Nsumbu National Park at Kasaba Bay on Lake Tanganyika
- South Luangwa National Park on the Luangwa River
- Kafue National Park on the Kafue River and the lake formed by the Itezhi-Tezhi Dam
- Mongu on the Zambezi
- Livingstone on the Zambezi
- Siavonga and Sinazongwe on Lake Kariba
- Lower Zambezi National Park on the Zambezi

In addition to these there are a number of tour companies and camps set up for fishing and adventure tours, especially on the upper Zambezi, mostly catering for international tourists at high prices.

=== Boat use for non-commercial and subsistence use ===
Use of dugout canoes has declined somewhat except in more remote locations, due to a relative shortage of good African Teak trees, and competition from timber plank, aluminium and glass-fibre boats. The use of outboard motors remains relatively low due to the high cost of fuel and lack of maintenance services.
