= Kanyembo =

Coordinates: 9°35′S 28°44′E

Kanyembo is the principal centre of the population on the Mofwe Lagoon, the largest of several lagoons in the Luapula River swamps south of Lake Mweru, in the Luapula Province of Zambia. It takes its name from its traditional ruler, Chief Kanyembo, one of the senior chiefs of the Kazembe-Lunda under Mwata Kazembe. In the past the incumbent Chief has been promoted to Mwata, and Kanyembo was the site of Mwata Kazembe's capital when it was visited by David Livingstone in 1867.

Kanyembo lies on the main artery of Luapula Province, the tarred road known as the Zambia Way, linking it to Nchelenge-Kashikishi in the north and Mwansabombwe and Mansa in the south. The villages lining the edge of the Luapula swamps and the south-eastern shore of Lake Mweru merge into each other in an almost unbroken sequence, as happens with Kanyembo and Shanyemba to its north, so the visitor can scarcely distinguish where one ends and the other begins.

The principal activity is fishing, and the hinterland supports farming. Extensive cassava gardens lie on the eastern side. As well as the large mango trees typical of traditional villages in northern Zambia, a notable feature of the Kanyembo area is mature oil palms, which are not native and do not occur naturally elsewhere in Zambia. Although there is no traditional story of their introduction, they were native to the Lunda Kingdom 300 km west from where the Lunda-Kazembe migrated.
