= Kazembe =

Traditional kingdom in present-day Zambia

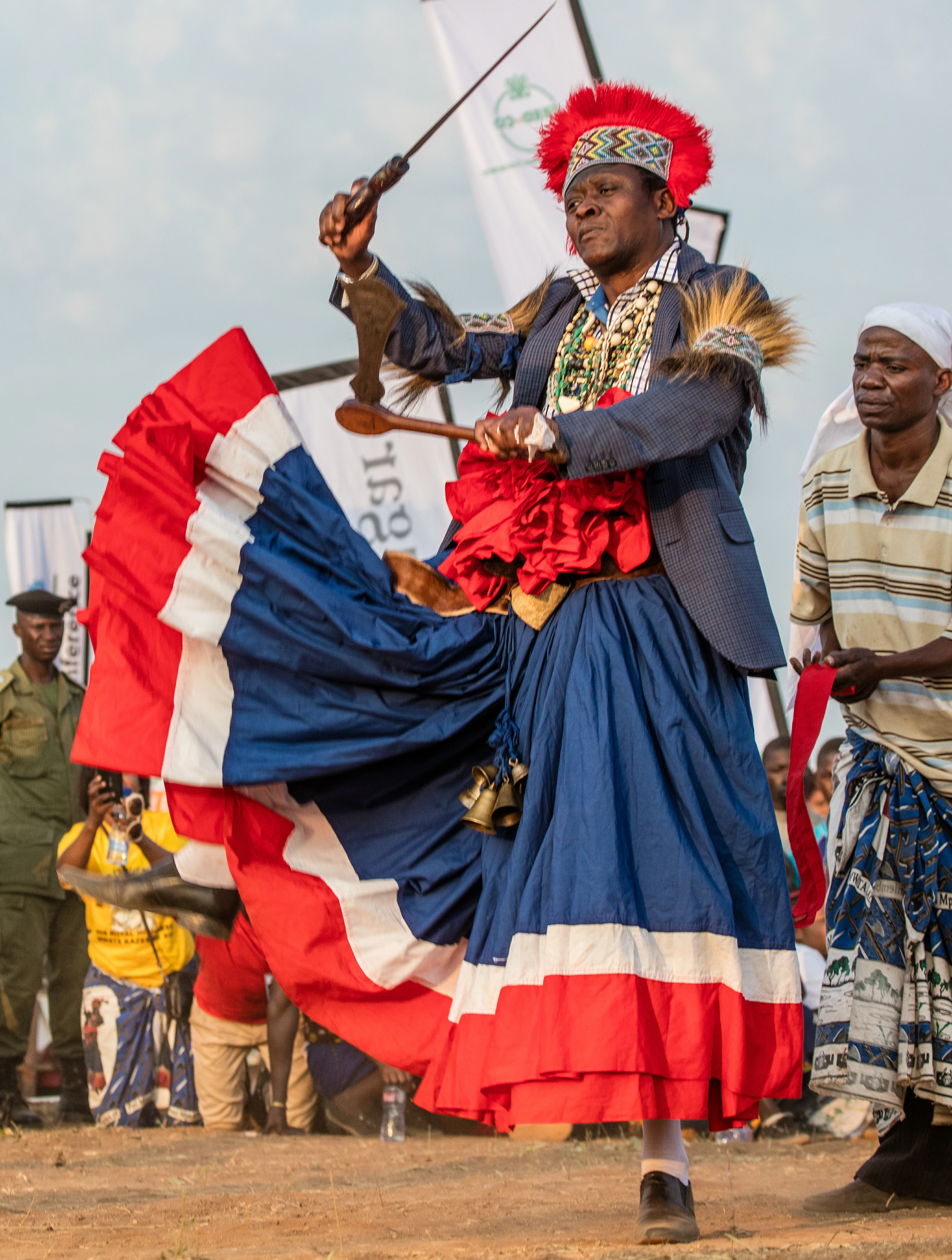
Mwata Kazembe at Mtomboko ceremony 2017

Kazembe is a traditional kingdom in modern-day Zambia, and southeastern Congo. For more than 250 years, Kazembe has been an influential kingdom of the Kiluba-Chibemba, speaking the language of the Eastern Luba-Lunda people of south-central Africa (also known as the Luba, Luunda, Eastern Luba-Lunda, and Luba-Lunda-Kazembe). Its position on trade routes in a well-watered, relatively fertile and well-populated area of forestry, fishery and agricultural resources drew expeditions by traders and explorers (such as Scottish missionary David Livingstone) who called it variously Kasembe, Cazembe and Casembe.

Known by the title Mwata Yav now equivalent to 'Paramount Chief'or King, the monarchy with its annual Mutomboko festival stands out in the Luapula Valley and Lake Mweru in present-day Zambia, though its history in colonial times is an example of how Europeans divided traditional kingdoms and tribes without regard to the consequences.

== History ==
=== Pre-colonial history ===
==== Origin of the Luba-Lunda-Kazembe ====
List of Mwata Kazembe Chiefs
Italics indicate approx dates
| 1740–5 | I Ng'anga Bilonda |
| 1745–60 | II Kanyembo Mpemba |
Continued below in the section
to which their rule relates

Around 1740 the first Mwata, Ng'anga Bilonda of the Luba-Lunda Kingdom headed by Mwata Yamvo (or 'Mwaant Yav') 300 km west of the Luapula in the DR Congo, left with a group of followers in pursuit eastwards of one Mutanda who had murdered his father Chinyanta and uncle by drowning them in the Mukelweji River. 'Mwata' was originally a title equivalent to 'General', the first of the Mwata Kazembe line were warriors.

After Mutanda had been dealt with, the group continued the eastward migration under Mwata Kazembe II Kanyembo Mpemba, crossing the Luapula River at Matanda, conquering the indigenous people known as the Shila in the Luapula Valley, and setting up Luba or Lunda aristocrats as chiefs over them. Though bringing Lunda and Luba customs and culture (such as the Luba style of ceremonial chieftainship), they adopted the language of the Bemba, a tribe that had also migrated from the Congo and to which they were allied.

The kingdom prospered from the fisheries of Lake Mweru and the Mofwe Lagoon, and natural resources, including copper ore in Katanga, west of the Luapula. Mwata Kazembe was said by the Portuguese to be able to raise a force of 20,000 men, and his lands stretched west to the Lualaba River (the border with Mwata Yamvo's western Luba-Lunda kingdom and with the other Luba's kingdoms north of that) and east to the Luba-Bemba country. (See the map below.)

==== Portuguese expeditions ====
| 1760–1805 | III Lukwesa Ilunga |
| 1805–1850 | IV Kanyembo Keleka Mayi |
| 1850–1854 | V Kapumba Mwongo Mfwama |

In addition to trading with the interior, the Portuguese hoped to establish a route through it connecting their territories of Angola in the west and Mozambique in the east.

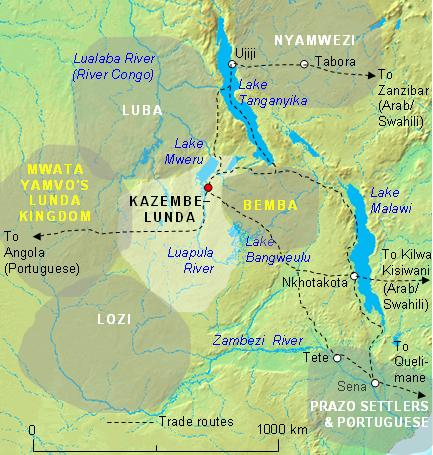
The Kazembe kingdom in its prime in the first half of the 19th Century.

The expeditions were:

- 1796 Manuel Caetano Pereira, a merchant.
- 1798 Francisco José de Lacerda e Almeida who came via Tete and died within a few weeks of arriving at Kazembe's, still waiting for trade negotiations to start. He left a valuable journal which was carried back to Tete by his chaplain, Father Pinto, and which was later translated into English by the explorer Sir Richard Burton.
- 1802 Pedro João Baptista and Amaro José, pombeiros (slave traders).
- 1831 Major José Monteiro and António Gamito, with 20 soldiers and 120 slaves as porters, sent from Sena by the Portuguese governor of that district. Gamito also wrote a journal and said, "We certainly never expected to find so much ceremonial, pomp, and ostentation in the potentate of a region so remote from the sea coast."

As trade missions, though, they were all failures. Mwata Kazembe III Lukwesa Ilunga and IV Kanyembo Keleka Mayi rebuffed Portuguese attempts to set up the alliance which would control the Atlantic-Indian Ocean trade route from beginning to end. (The Sultan of Zanzibar and Msiri later took control of that route, with Msiri rather than Kazembe as the linchpin.)

==== David Livingstone's visit ====
In 1867 the explorer and missionary David Livingstone embarked on his last expedition in Africa, one aim of which was to discover the southern extent of the Nile basin (i.e. resolving whether Lake Victoria truly was the source of the Nile or whether some other lake further south was the source). From 'Nyasaland' (Malawi) and past the southern tip of Lake Tanganyika, through country ravaged by the slave trade, he reached the northeastern shore of Lake Mweru. He continued south down the eastern shore. Mwata Kazembe VII had been alerted to his arrival and received him at his capital which was then at Kanyembo near the northeast tip of the Mofwe Lagoon:

“The court or compound of Casembe—some would call it a palace—is a square enclosure of 300 yards by 200 yards. It is surrounded by a hedge of high reeds. Inside, where Casembe honoured me with a grand reception, stands a gigantic hut for Casembe, and a score of small huts for domestics. The Queen's hut stands behind that of the chief, with a number of small huts also ... Kasembe sat before his hut on an equate seat placed on lion and leopard skins. He was clothed in a coarse blue and white Manchester print edged with red baize, and arranged in large folds so as to look like a crinoline put on wrong side foremost. His arms, legs and head were covered with sleeves, leggings and cap made of various coloured beads in neat patterns: a crown of yellow feathers surmounted his cap ... He then assured me that I was welcome to his country, to go where I liked, and do what I chose. We then went (two boys carrying his train behind him) to an inner apartment, where the articles of my present were exhibited in detail

—extract from The Last Journals of David Livingstone in Central Africa from 1865 To His Death.

| 1854–1862 | VI Chinyanta Munona |
| 1862–70 | VII Mwonga Nsemba |

Livingstone noted that Mwata Kazembe VII's administration was harsh: A common punishment for court officials was to have the ears cropped by shears. Owing to such tyranny, he would have difficulty raising a thousand men. He observed that the kingdom was not now as prosperous as the Portuguese had reported. The next year he again visited Mwata, who was the first to tell him that the Chambeshi, Lake Bangweulu, the Luapula, Lake Mweru and the Luvua-Lualaba were all one system. This sent Livingstone exploring Bangweulu, then the Lualaba which he thought may flow into the Nile, and Tanganyika, then back to Bangweulu and his death five years later, still trying to discover how its rivers link up and for any evidence that it was part of the Nile rather than the Congo Basin.

==== Arab and Swahili traders ====
| 1870–72 | VIII Chinkonkole Kafuti |
| 1872–83 & 1885–86 | IX Lukwesa Mpanga |
| 1883–85 & 1886–1904 | X Kanyembo Ntemena |

In the 18th and 19th centuries Arab and Swahili traders visited Mwata Kazembe to trade in copper, ivory and slaves. Trade routes such as that from Zanzibar via Ujiji on Lake Tanganyika were well established, and the Sultan of Zanzibar's name carried weight. Livingstone was held up southeast of Lake Tanganyika by a conflict between Tippu Tip (Ahmed bin Mohamed, whom Livingstone called Tipo Tipo) and a local chief. When he reached Mwata Kazembe's he found a trader named Mohamad Bogharib had arrived a few days before seeking ivory, and Mohamad bin Saleh (also known as Mpamari), a trader who had been there for ten years, as Mwata had refused to let him leave. Despite their involvement in the slave trade, Livingstone travelled with and was helped by them; he claimed to have used his influence to get Mohamed bin Saleh released.

In 1856, Msiri travelled through Kazembe with a band of followers and requested permission from King Chinyanta Munona to settle among Kazembe's tributary of Garanganza (Katanga). Throughout the 1860s, Kazembe's copper and ivory trade was usurped by Msiri, growing his power with the help of local traders and their descendents, known as bayeke. With the help of the bayeke, Msiri rebelled against the chief of Garanganza and established the Yeke Kingdom. Utilizing gunpowder weapons, Msiri rapidly expanded through former Kazembe territory, carving a large territory for himself and reducing the Kazembe to a small state along Lake Bangwelu, which he held sway over until his death in 1890.

=== Colonial history ===
==== Division between British and Belgian territories ====
After Msiri's death, the Luapula valley was divided in 1894 between Britain – the eastern shores of the Luapula and Lake Mweru became part of North-Eastern Rhodesia, administered by the British South Africa Company (BSAC) – and King Leopold II of Belgium's misnamed Congo Free State (CFS), or rather its agent, the Compagnie du Katanga, which took over the western shores. The Belgian colonial authorities, having killed Msiri were left with a vacuum. They appointed chiefs – not ones chosen from Msiri's subordinate chiefs (who had previously been subordinate to Mwata Kazembe) – but from what the Luba-Lunda called the 'owners of the land' who had preceded them; there was considerable instability in that part of Katanga as a result. “Belgian administration in Mweru-Luapula was glossed over by a thin veneer of traditional justifications.” This included ‘creating’ a tribe from what was a clan, the Bena Ngoma.

Once Belgian colonial rule was established west of the Luapula, Mwata Kazembe's rule and territory, though not his influence, was confined to the eastern side.

==== British rule imposed by force ====
Although Mwata Kazembe X had signed a BSAC mineral concession and a British treaty brought to him by Alfred Sharpe in 1890, and allowed visits by British missionary pioneer Dan Crawford, when the BSAC tax collector Blair Watson took up residence on the Kalungwishi River in 1897, Mwata Kazembe refused to let the British flag be flown over his territory or taxes to be collected from his people, and he defeated an armed incursion by Watson's forces.

Sharpe by now was governor of the British Central Africa Protectorate (Nyasaland), 1000 km away. It was he who had failed to secure Msiri's Garanganza kingdom as a British Protectorate by negotiation, and had later seen it taken from under British noses by the rival CFS through force. In 1899, in conjunction with Robert Codrington, acting BSAC Administrator of North-Eastern Rhodesia, Sharpe sent British officers with Sikh and Nyasaland troops who burnt Mwata Kazembe's capital to the ground, killing a number of his people, though Mwata himself had already escaped across the Luapula.

Mwata Kazembe X made his way south and crossed back over the river to take refuge in the Johnston Falls Mission run by a Mr and Mrs Anderson of Dan Crawford's missionary society. (Ironically, two years before, Mwata Kazembe X had tried to have the Andersons' predecessor at Mambilima, H. J. Pomeroy, killed, but failed.)

Dan Crawford and Alfred Sharpe had been involved in a similar situation in 1890–91 with Msiri (see that article). At that time Crawford's superior, Charles Swan, had encouraged Msiri to resist Sharpe's British treaty. A year later Msiri was killed by the Belgians, and the region was plunged into chaos. Now, the Andersons responded to Swan differently. While Mr Anderson kept Mwata Kazembe's men at Mambilima, Mrs Anderson took Mwata Kazembe alone to the British officers back at his burnt capital, saying "please be kind to him". Disarmed by this approach and the Mwata's agreement to accept their rule, the British agreed to let him come back.

Mwata Kazembe X rebuilt his capital at Mwansabombwe. The British troops took a number of old and valuable works of art of Luba origin from the court, which they gave to Codrington. In 1920 his heirs placed them in the National Museum of Southern Rhodesia in Bulawayo, 1000 km away, where they were listed as the 'Codrington Collection'. They are still there.

After the punitive expedition, Mwata Kazembe X and his successors worked with the BSAC and its successors, the British District Commissioners, and to some extent it rescued his chieftainship. The Mwata Kazembes had some influence in the colonial era because the British colonial administration ruled indirectly through chiefs.

==== The coming of missionaries ====
With Dan Crawford's influence Mwata Kazembe X readily agreed to requests to establish missions in the valley, especially from the Christian Missions in Many Lands and the London Missionary Society (LMS) which had sent Livingstone to Africa. In 1900 the LMS Mbereshi Mission was established 10 km from Mwansabombwe. Here schools, a church and a hospital were established, and brick makers and builders were trained, resulting in the Luapula valley enjoying a higher standard of sun-dried and burnt brick house construction than elsewhere in the region. Other Protestant and Catholic missions established schools and hospitals in the Luapula Valley and on the lake.

Though by the mid-20th century Mwata Kazembe's realm had become overshadowed by the copper mines and industry of Elisabethville (Lubumbashi) and the Copperbelt, through their education gained mostly in mission schools, many Luba-Lunda-Kazembe people made their mark in those towns and in Lusaka, and their experience and influence there flowed back the other way.

==== Structure of the kingdom ====
| 1904–19 | XI Mwonga Kapakata |
| 1919–36 | XII Chinyanta Kasasa |
| 1936–41 | XIII Chinkonkole |

Following the Luba kingdom model, Mwata Kazembe as the king has senior chiefs under him, and subordinate chiefs and village headmen under them. The Senior Chiefs are Lukwesa, Kashiba, Kambwali and Kanyembo. Mwata appoints these chiefs from his family and, upon his death, one of these senior chiefs may be promoted to the paramount position. There are also chiefs in neighbouring districts who pay tribute to Mwata Kazembe.

Also following Luba custom, Mwata Kazembe ruled through a council which in colonial times became a 'Superior Native Authority', named in this case the Lunda Native Authority (LNA) to which he appointed a 'cabinet' of advisers who meet under his chairmanship. The LNA was the largest and dominant native authority in the Luapula-Mweru valley. Its work had to be reported to the British District Commissioners who preferred to base themselves in the climate and environment of Kawambwa on the plateau rather than in the heat and mosquitoes of the valley where most of the population lived. It took up a whole day just for quick visit and, in the absence of problems, this allowed the Kazembe chieftainship considerable autonomy.

==== Functions of the kingdom ====
Essentially the functions of the kingdom are in the realm of local government, with a stronger emphasis on cultural, social and historical aspects of the life of Kazembe people wherever they may live. The Mwata and his council make regulations in areas not covered by national law or provincial regulations, of land and resource use and management, buildings and infrastructure, employment and occupations, trade and markets, hygiene and health, and traditions and customs including traditional marriage and family life. The Mwata has messengers and guards to enforce regulations, and operates a traditional court to try transgressors; he is also involved in the resolution of disputes.

==== Modernising the kingdom ====
| 1941–50 | XIV Shadreck Chinyanta Nankula |
| 1950–57 | XV Brown Ngombe |
| 1957–61 | XVI Kanyembo Kapema |

The Belgian Congo copper-mining town of Elisabethville developed faster than the Northern Rhodesian Copperbelt. Cut off by the Congo Pedicle, the Luapula Province was regarded as a backwater by the Northern Rhodesian government in the first part of the 20th century, so that at first Elisabethville was the most accessible city for the Kazembe, connected as it was by road to the Congolese port of Kasenga on the Luapula, and by boat from there up the river to Lake Mweru. There was migration from the British-administered side to the Belgian one. For further details, see the articles on the Congo Pedicle and Congo Pedicle road.

Mwata Kazembe XIV Shadreck Chinyanta Nankula in the 1940s did much to change this situation. He developed the kingdom and the district, and has been called the first "modernizing" Mwata. He had been educated and employed in Elizabethville and spoke fluent French and English. He galvanised the LNA, changing its name to the Lunda National Association, and appointing to it people with an energy for change and development, like himself. The District Commissioner worried that some of these, such as Dauti Yamba were nationalists who might stir up trouble against the colonial administration, but relationships remained workable. Mwata Kazembe XIV encouraged the building of schools and clinics in Mwansabombwe and the expansion of missions such as Mbereshi. He wrote an account of the chieftainship which was edited by a White Father missionary, Edouard Labreque, and finally published in Chibemba as Ifikolwe Fyandi na Bantu Bandi (My Ancestors and My People) built the current two-storey Mwata's residence but died two days before it was complete.

In the early 1950s, some problems were created across the Luapula when the Luba-Lunda there noted that Mwata Kazembe's courts dispensed justice more to their liking than the Belgians and their chiefs, and asked to be tried for transgressions by the Mwata's courts on the grounds that as Lunda, they had that right, and the local chiefs did not have the authority. But this was not granted.

The modernising of the kingdom was matched by an increase in prosperity as the Pedicle road connected the Luapula Province to the Copperbelt, and fish and labour flowed more easily to that market.

=== Independence to the present day ===
| 1961–83 | XVII Paul Kanyembo Lutaba |
| 1983–98 | XVIII Munona Chinyanta |
| 1998– | XIX Paul Mpemba Kanyembo Kapale Mpalume |

In 1964 Northern Rhodesia became independent Zambia. For a time, chiefs saw their influence overshadowed by party politics and the civil administrations, though in 1985 Mwata Kazembe XVIII was appointed District Commissioner in Kawambwa and later, Provincial Political Secretary.

The fish and labour economic booms in the forties, fifties and sixties gave way to recessions and stagnation from the mid-seventies onwards as fish catches declined, Copperbelt employment contracted and national problems had an effect. However, the construction in the late sixties of the 'Zambia Way', a road connecting Mansa to Nchelenge-Kashikishi through Mwansabombwe, and its surfacing and linking to Kawambwa, Samfya and Serenje over the next two decades, has funnelled trade through Mwansabombwe, the population of which has risen to around 50,000.

The Mwata Kazembe chieftainship has endured and though originating in war and being surrounded by countries that have experienced much conflict, it has presided over peace on the eastern shores of the Luapula and Lake Mweru for more than a century.

== Mutomboko Festival ==
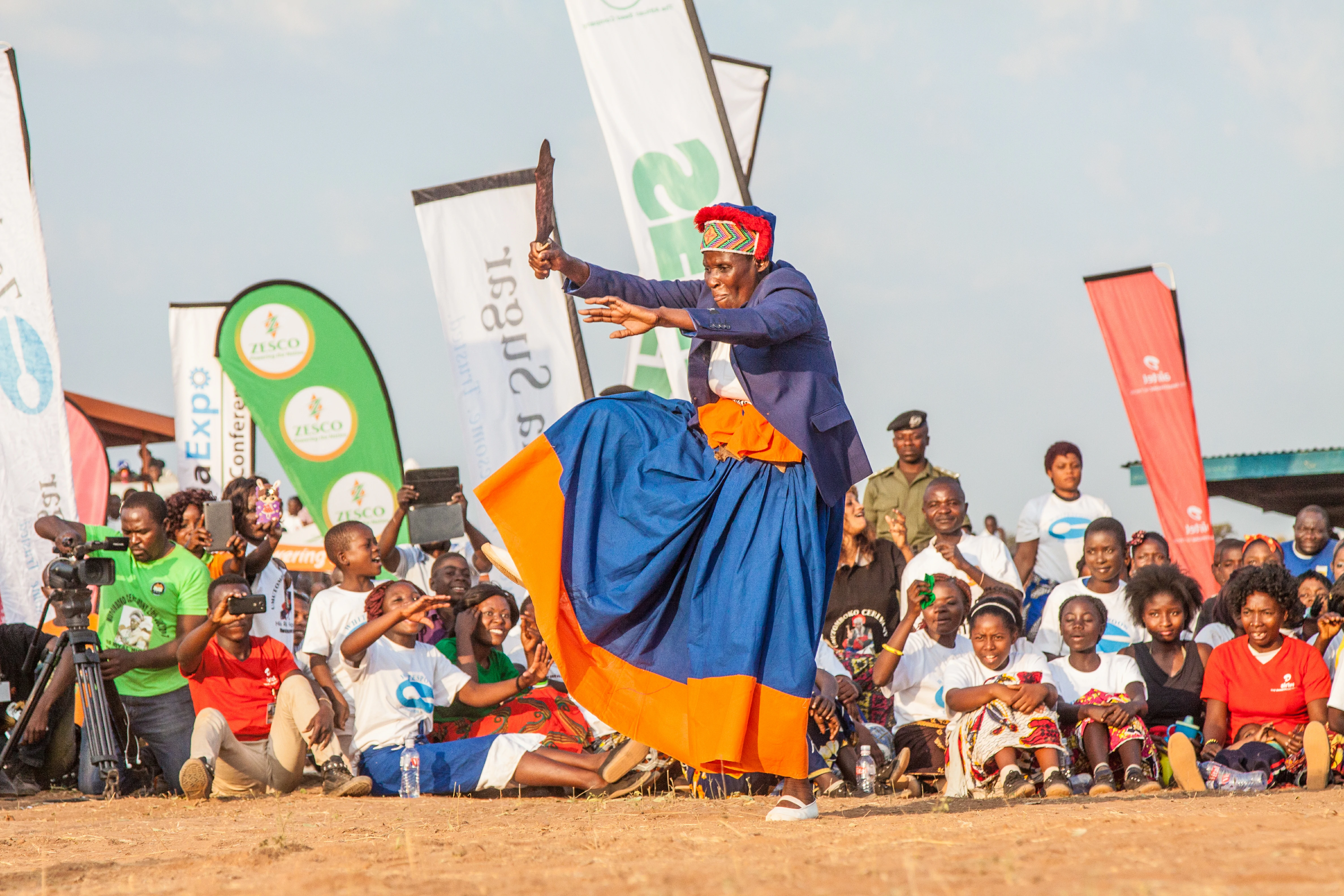
Mwata Kazembe at Mtomboko 2017

In the last two decades the Mwata Kazembe chieftainship has experienced something of a cultural if not an administrative or economic resurgence, through the Mutomboko Festival, now the second largest of its kind in Zambia and a model for the strengthening of indigenous culture.

It is held at the end of July and may attract 20,000 visitors, including the president of Zambia. Drawing on previous ceremonies and traditions, it was started in its present form in 1971 to mark the tenth anniversary of the instalment of Mwata Kazembe XVII Paul Kanyembo Lutaba (whose photograph appears at the top of the page). It includes dances symbolising the migration of the Luba-Lunda and the conquest of the Luapula valley by the first chiefs.

== See also ==
- Luapula River
- Alfred Sharpe
- David Livingstone
- Mwansabombwe
- Lunda Kingdom
- Luba Kingdom
- Bemba people
