= Chiengi (constituency) =

Constituency of the National Assembly of Zambia

Chiengi, also referred to as Chienge, is a constituency of the National Assembly of Zambia. It covers Chiengi in Chiengi District of Luapula Province.

== List of MPs ==
Election year	MP	Party
1973	Samson Mununga	United National Independence Party
1978	Maxwell Lufoma	United National Independence Party
1983	Maxwell Lufoma	United National Independence Party
1988	Tayaisius Koti	United National Independence Party
1991	Ephraim Chibwe	Movement for Multi-Party Democracy
1996	Katele Kalumba	Movement for Multi-Party Democracy
2001	Katele Kalumba	Movement for Multi-Party Democracy
2006	Katele Kalumba	Movement for Multi-Party Democracy
2011	Benson Kapaya	Patriotic Front
2016	Given Katuta	Forum for Democracy and Development
2021	Given Katuta	Independent
2026	Favourite Musangu	United Party for National Development
