= Isokwe =

Coordinates: 9.36667°S 28.6667°E

Isokwe Island (also known as Isokwe, Sokwa or Sokwe Island) is an island on Lake Mweru in Luapula Province, Zambia. Isokwe is occupied, and is 7 kilometres (4.3 mi) long and up to 2 kilometres (1.2 mi) wide. It is located about 5 kilometres (3.1 mi) outside the city of Kashikishi.

Zambia, the country that Isokwe is located in (northern side).

Isokwe is a narrow, elongated fishing island, which passes to the west into the Luapula swamps of the delta. It is regularly visited by people from Nchelenge by ferry.

== Weather ==
Isokwe's weather usually ranges from 60 °F to 70 °F in winter and around 85 °F in summer.

The wind speed normally appears from 10 km/h to 18 km/h, with rain in winter taking place quite often.
