= Mweru (constituency) =

National Assembly constituency in Zambia

Mweru is a constituency of the National Assembly of Zambia. It was created in 2026 by splitting Nchelenge constituency. It covers the northern part of Nchelenge District, including the town of Kashikishi.

== List of MPs ==
Election year	MP	Party
2026	Lesley Mulwanda	United Party for National Development
