= Mbereshi =

- Town
- Location in Zambia
- Coordinates: 9°44′S 28°47′E
- Country: Zambia
- Province: Luapula Province
- District: Mwansabombwe District
- Time zone: UTC+2 (CAT)

Mbereshi (also spelled and pronounced Mbeleshi) is a village in the Luapula Province of Zambia, named after the Mbereshi River on its north side. It is the site of a large mission founded in 1900 by the London Missionary Society. In 1915 the mission established Mbereshi Girls' School, the first girls' school in the territory, as well as a boys' school and a large hospital. The Girls school and Hospital are now Grant Aided institutions run by The United Church of Zambia. Mbereshi contains a number of examples of mission buildings, including a large church which is now part of the United Church of Zambia.

Mbereshi lies on the main tarred highway of the Luapula River valley running from Mansa to Nchelenge and is 10 kilometres (6.2 mi) north-east of Mwata Kazembe's town of Mwansabombwe.
