= Kazembe (Mwansabombwe) =

Mwansabombwe
- Town
- Kazembe
- Location in Zambia
- Coordinates: 9°49′S 28°45′E
- Country: Zambia
- Province: Luapula Province
- District: Mwansabombwe District
- Time zone: UTC+2 (CAT)
- Climate: Aw

Kazembe (or Kasembe) is a name used for Mwata Kazembe's town in the Luapula Province of Zambia, especially on maps and in the Zambian postal service (as PO Kazembe). The other name for the town is Mwansabombwe ("where Mwansa works") and this is the one used by its or Luba or Chibemba-speaking inhabitants. They may refer in English to "Kazembe's Village" or just "Kazembe", as traditionally a settlement is named after the chief or headman, rather than the location. The Luba-Lunda shared with many tribes the custom (now discontinued) of moving to another village or a new site on the death of the chief. Historical references to a village or town may actually be to a different location. For instance when the explorer David Livingstone visited Mwata Kazembe in 1867 and 1868, "Casembe's town", as he wrote it, was further north at the town now called Kanyembo.

Mwansabombwe is situated where the Ngona River enters the swamps of the Luapula River south of Lake Mweru. A number of channels through the swamps and lagoons connect to the main river channel about 5 km away, facilitating fishing and trade (mainly illicit) with DR Congo. The town lies close to the middle point of the main artery of the Luapula Province, the tarred road informally known as the 'Valley Road' running from Mansa to Nchelenge, and connecting southwards first to the "Samfya Road" (from Mansa to Serenje) and then to the Great North Road at Serenje. A tarred road also connects eastwards via Mbereshi to the northern Zambian plateau at Kawambwa.

These features and its status since the 1890s as Mwata Kazembe's capital make Mwansabombwe one of the largest centres of trade, population and culture in the Luapula Valley with a population estimated at 50,000. It retains a rural and traditional African character relatively unmarked by the colonial era leading to it being called the "largest village in central Africa".

== See also ==
- Mwata Kazembe's Mutomboko Festival
