= Mofwe Lagoon =

- Location within Zambia
- Location: Luapula Province, Zambia
- Coordinates: 9°37′S 28°42′E
- Primary inflows: Mbereshi River, Luapula River

The Mofwe Lagoon is the largest of several lagoons in the Luapula River swamps south of Lake Mweru, in the Luapula Province of Zambia.

== Geography ==
Its size and shape depends on the season and amount of water flowing into the swamps, especially from the Mbereshi River to the southeast, its main supplier. Generally its north–south axis is about 14 km and its east–west axis is about 6 km. Floating islands of sedge are usually found in an east–west line across its middle, which may effectively cut it in two, and at times vegetation has covered much of the southern half.

The importance of the Mofwe lies in its fishery, which attracted Mwata Kazembe to settle in the town of Kanyembo on its eastern edge in the 19th century. The Mofwe does not have a definite shore and is not easily accessed, being lined by a dense band of very tall reeds, and having floating rafts and islands of sedge which change its margins and shape frequently. Local fishermen paddle dugout canoes along narrow channels through the reeds to reach open water. The lagoon and surrounding swamps support populations of hippopotamus and crocodiles.

The lagoon is separated from the main channel of the Luapula by 6 km of swamps. Although the Luapula swamps are generally 30 to 40 km wide for most of their 100 km length, at the nearest point to Mofwe, the Luapula's western bank is formed by an island in the DR Congo only 12 km from Kanyembo. This facilitates trade and smuggling by canoe through the channels and lagoons of the swamps.

== See also ==
- Luapula River
- Kazembe
- Lake Mweru

== Sources ==
- David Livingstone and Horace Waller (ed.): The Last Journals of David Livingstone in Central Africa from 1865 to his Death. Two volumes, John Murray, 1874.
