= Given Katuta Mwelwa =

Zambian politician & member of parliament

Honorable Given Katuta Mwelwa

Elected member of the National Assembly
- In office August 2016 – May 2026
- Constituency: Chiengi

Personal details
- Born: Given Katuta; 6 March 1969 (age 57) Chiengi, Zambia
- Party: Forum for Democracy and Development (2016-2021); Independent (2021-present)

Given Katuta Mwelwa (born 6 March 1969 in Chiengi) is a Zambian politician who served as the member of parliament for Chiengi from 2016 to 2026.

== Early life and education ==
Katuta was born in Chiengi (which, at that time, was part of Nchelenge District) on 6 March 1969. She was given an Honorary Doctorate Degree in Public Administration from the London Graduate School of the Commonwealth University in 2022. She was given a Bachelor of Business Administration from Chalimbana University in Zambia in 2024.

== Politics and career ==
Katuta was elected as the only Member of Parliament under the Forum for Democracy and Development (FDD) party in the 2016 general election after beating the Patriotic Front candidate in Chiengi constituency. In the 2021 general election, she was re-elected in Chiengi constituency as the only female Independent Member of Parliament in a male-dominated political space.

During her parliamentary work, she has served on various committees such as the Committee on Cabinet Affairs, the Committee on Transport and Communication, Executive Committee Member of Caucus on Children’s Rights, Zambia Women Parliamentary Caucus, Zambia-China Friendship Association, and Commonwealth Parliamentarians with Disabilities. She has also chaired the Select Committee appointed to scrutinize the 2016 constitution and submit to Parliament. She also served as the Chair for the Select Committee appointed by the Speaker of the Zambian Parliament to scrutinize the appointment of judges. She won the African Women Summit award in 2023.

In October 2025, Katuta announced that she would stand for presidency as an independent candidate at the 2026 general election.

== Personal life ==
Katuta is married to Lawrence Mwelwa, a former university vice-chancellor at Chreso University.
