= Milenge =

Milenge may refer to:

- Milenge, Zambia
- Milenge District, Zambia
- Milenge Milenge, a 2010 Indian Hindi-language film

== See also ==
- Phir Milenge (disambiguation)
