= Milenge, Zambia =

Settlement in Luapula, Zambia

Coordinates: 11°55′30″S 28°56′35″E

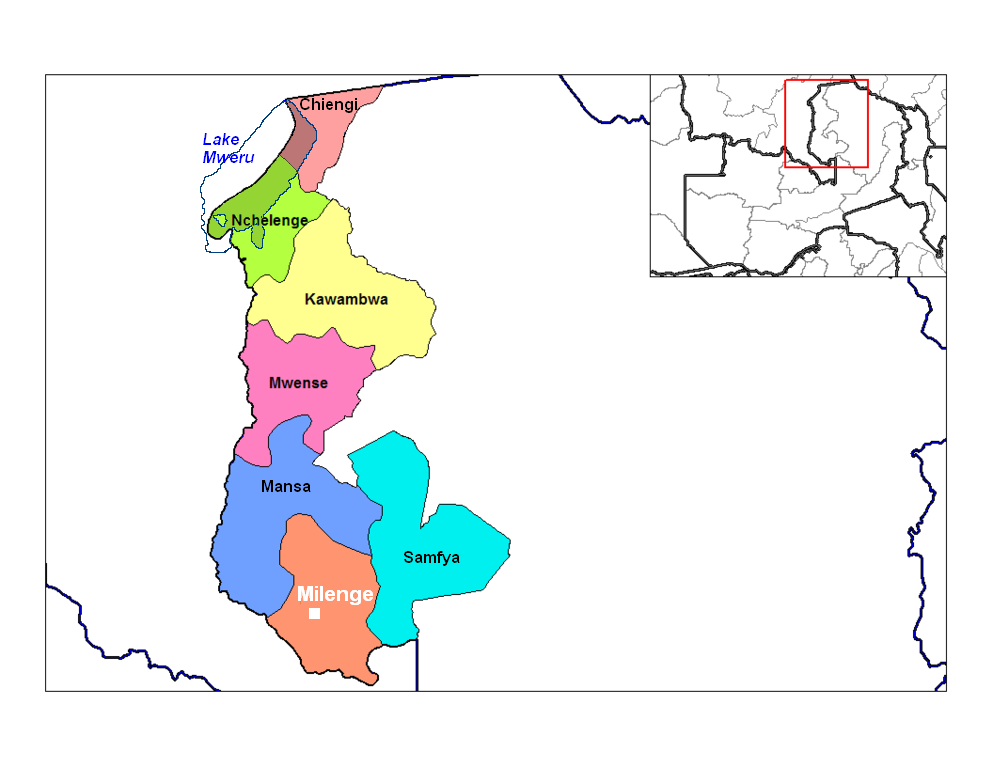
Location of Milenge town and district in Luapula Province, Zambia

Milenge is a settlement in the Luapula Province of Zambia, and headquarters of Milenge District. It consists of the boma housing the district council and offices. Milenge is a village of a few thousand people on the dirt road which runs from Chembe in the west. Bemba is the primary language.

== See also ==
- Luapula Province
- Luapula River
