= Lawrence Mwelwa =

Zambian professor

Vice Chancellor of Chreso University
- In office 1 August 2010 – January 2019

Personal details
- Born: Mkushi, Zambia
- Spouse: Given Katuta Mwelwa
- Profession: Professor

Lawrence Mwelwa is a Zambian writer, entrepreneur, academic, and politician. He was the Vice Chancellor of Chreso University until 2019.

== Early life and education ==
Mwelwa was born in Mkushi district. He has served on the boards of various universities in Zambia and Botswana.

He has served as the Vice Chancellor of Chreso University Zambia and as a Member of the Subcommittee on Commerce of the Patriotic Front, where he has championed policies and initiatives of the party.

== Personal life ==
Mwelwa is married to Given Katuta Mwelwa.
