= Mabel Shaw (missionary) =

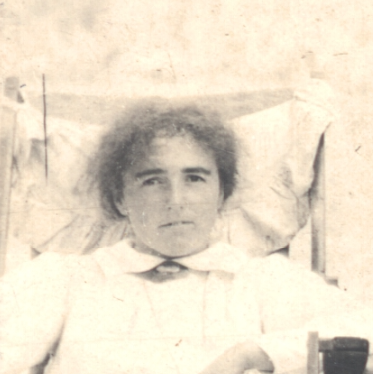
- Born: 3 December 1888; Heath Town
- Died: 25 April 1973 (aged 84); Guildford
- Education: St Colm's College
- Occupation: missionary
- Employer: London Missionary Society

Mabel Shaw OBE (1889–1973) was an English missionary and educator in Northern Rhodesia. In her time "she was the most renowned missionary in Africa".

== Life ==
Shaw was born in 1888 in Wolverhampton. She was the first born child of Elizabeth Anne, born Burgess and Walter Shaw who would have six more children. Her father was a grocer and managed a tea-shop. When she was five she went to live with her grandmother and when she was ten she went to boarding school where she adopted her life long faith in Christianity.

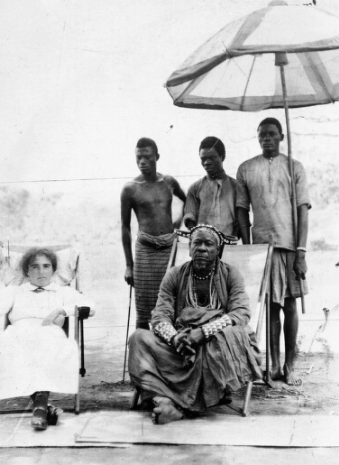
Shaw and Chief Kazembe in 1915

She was trained over four years as a missionary in Edinburgh at Ann Hunter Small's Women's Missionary Training College.

Shaw joined the London Missionary Society and in 1915 sailed for Africa where she was the first unmarried female missionary to be sent by the London Missionary Society to their Central African mission.

Shaw founded the Mbereshi Girls' School, a mission boarding school at Mbereshi which was the first girls' school in Northern Rhodesia. In the 1931 Birthday Honours she was made an OBE. She served as its Principal until 1940. She left the London Missionary Society in 1941, and in 1942 was appointed to another missionary organisation, the Church Missionary Society, for whom she worked in Uganda until 1947. She retired in 1952.

Her papers are held at the School of Oriental and African Studies.

She died in 1973 in Guildford when she was poor and no longer well known. Her admirers and mourners in Africa raised money to have her remains returned to Zambia, where they were interred in the chapel at Mbereshi Mission.

== Works ==
- Children of the Chief. LMS Gift Book for 1921.
- Dawn in Africa: Stories of Girl Life. Edinburgh House Press, 1927.
- God's Candlelights: An Educational Venture in Northern Rhodesia. Edinburgh House Press, 1932.
- A Treasure of Darkness: An Idyll of African Child Life. Longmans, 1936.
