= Chiengi =

- Location in Zambia
- Coordinates: 8°38′00″S 29°10′00″E
- Country: Zambia
- Province: Luapula Province
- District: Chiengi District
- Time zone: UTC+2 (CAT)

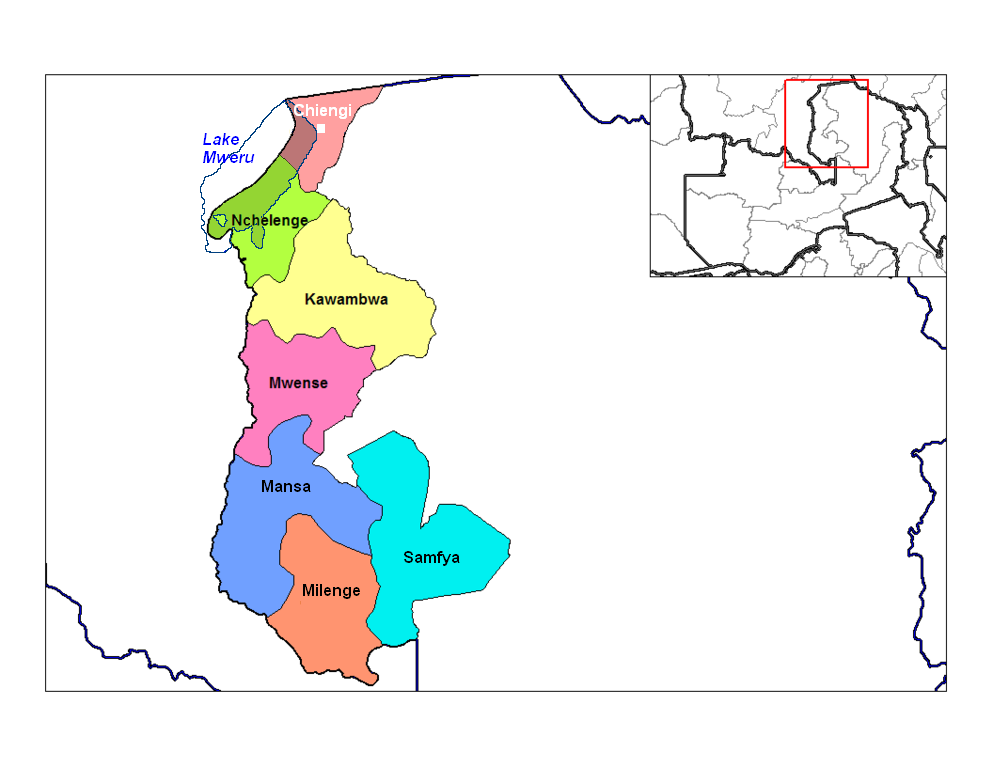
Location of Chiengi town and district in Luapula Province, Zambia

Chiengi is a historic colonial boma of the British Empire in central Africa and today is a settlement in the Luapula Province of Zambia, and headquarters of Chiengi District. Chiengi is in the north-east corner of Lake Mweru, and at the foot of wooded hills dividing that lake from Lake Mweru Wantipa, and overlooking a dambo (marshy plain) stretching northwards from the lake, where the Chiengi rivulet (the origin of the name) flows down from the hills.

== History ==
=== Pre-colonial history ===
Chiengi and the area just to its north were ravaged by the slave trade and related ivory trade in the 18th century. Numerous Arab and Swahili slave traders such as Tippu Tib operated around the north end of Lake Mweru, around Lake Mweru Wantipa and over to Lake Tanganyika.

=== Colonial history ===
Chiengi boma was established during the race between Belgian King Leopold II's Congo Free State and the British South Africa Company (BSAC) of Cecil Rhodes to seize Katanga from its king, Msiri, in 1890–91. Alfred Sharpe was sent to obtain a treaty from Msiri by the BSAC from the British Commissioner's office at Zomba in Nyasaland in 1890, but he failed. On his way back to Nyasaland in early 1891 he passed the Chiengi rivulet and, since Chief Puta Chipalabwe who reigned as a Chief of the Bwile people between 1879 and 1909. Bwile people, five kilometres (3.1 mi) to the south, was amenable to a treaty, Sharpe decided to set up a boma there to secure the territory east of Mweru for the BSAC, and to act as a forward base for another attempt to wring a treaty out of Msiri. He left his second-in-command, Captain Crayshaw, with some African troops to build and staff the boma.

However, Leopold sent the Stairs Expedition to secure Katanga which they achieved in December 1891 after killing Msiri. On the way back to the east coast of Africa, the Stairs Expedition passed close to Chiengi and exchanged messages with Crayshaw regarding the position of the border dividing CFS and BSAC territory between Lake Mweru and Lake Tanganyika.

Chiengi Boma was probably the first colonial post in what was to be called North-Eastern Rhodesia (it was still referred to as part of 'Zambezia' at the time), and was one of the most remote outposts of the British Empire, a lonely posting which sent more than one colonial officer mad. For a number of years the boma was removed to the Kalungwishi River, and during this period the Belgian colonial authorities in Pweto, just across the border in DR Congo, controlled the northern end of the lake including the western extremity of Chiengi District, the so-called Lunchinda enclave west of the Lunchinda River. The British then re-established the boma at Chiengi but the eventual outcome of de facto Belgian control of the Lunchinda enclave led to it eventually being ceded to DR Congo by Zambia—see the article on the Luapula Province border dispute.

Chiengi Boma was finally closed in 1933 and superseded by Kawambwa and then Nchelenge bomas.

In addition to fishing in the lake, the chief trade of Chiengi in colonial times was in salt, which had been deposited in the dambo by streams running out of the hills, and there was a thriving trade.

== History since ==
Chiengi was restored as a sub-administrative administrative centre under Nchelenge District of independent Zambia in the 1970s and as a full administrative district in the 1990s. The area has been affected by conflict in the Congo several times, most recently in the Second Congo War, when tens of thousands of refugees arrived and were settled in UNHCR camps in Kawambwa and Mporokoso Districts. Most of these have been repatriated since the end of that war. Reports have also been made of Congolese soldiers harassing Zambians at the border and inside Zambian territory.

== Roads ==
Chiengi is reached by a gravel road, frequently impassable in the rainy season, from Nchelenge and Kashikishi 100 kilometres (62 mi) south (the same journey can be done by boat). From Chiengi a dirt track runs along the flat northern lake shore to Pweto in DR Congo. A new gravel road has been constructed north-east to the border, around the Chipani Swamp and east to Kasongola from where (in the dry season) tracks connect to Kaputa in Zambia's Northern Province.

== See also ==
- Luapula Province
- Luapula Province border dispute
- Lake Mweru
