= Milenge District =

Coordinates: 11.9250°S 28.9478°E

- District
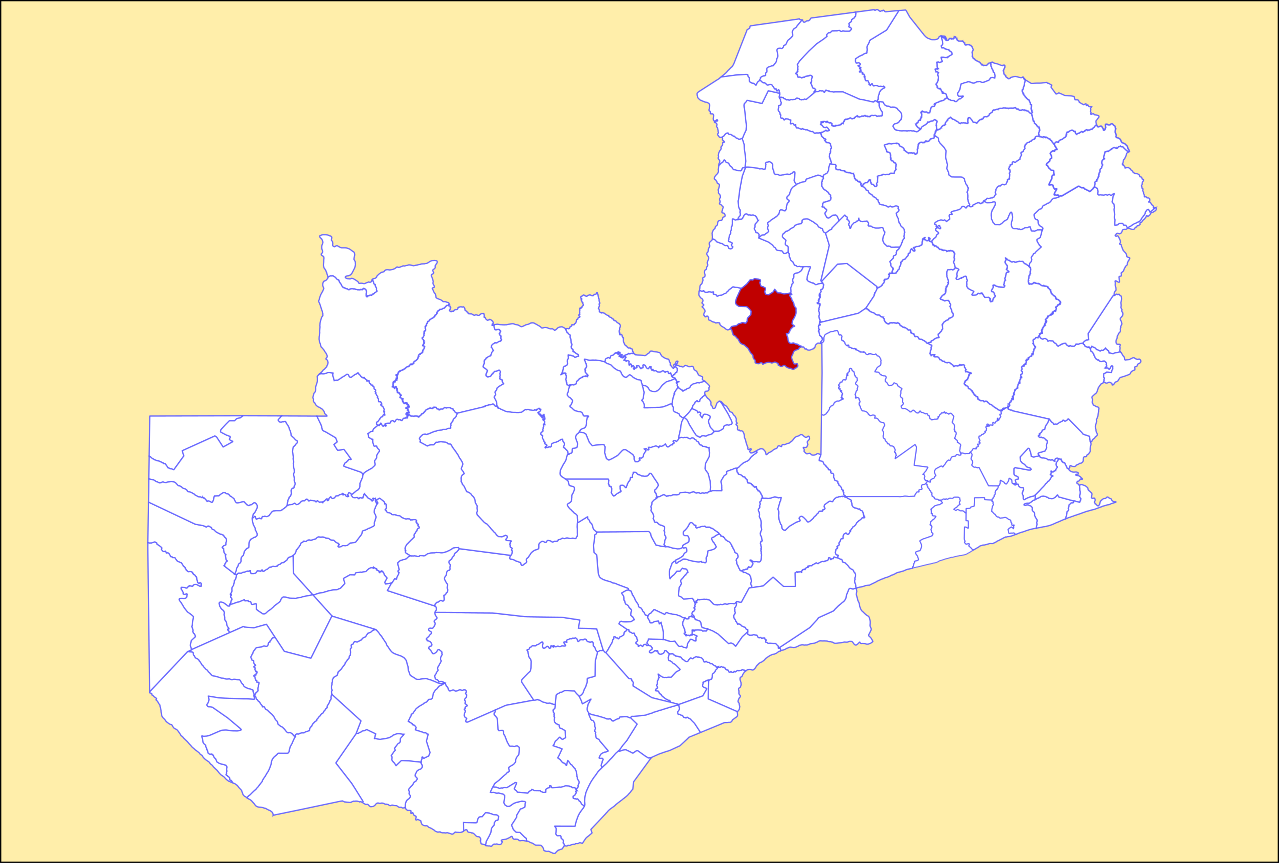
- District location in Zambia
- Country: Zambia
- Province: Luapula Province
- Capital: Milenge

Area
  - Total: 6,140.8 km^{2} (2,371.0 sq mi)

Population (2022)
  - Total: 56,543
  - Density: 9.2078/km^{2} (23.848/sq mi)
- Time zone: UTC+2 (CAT)

Milenge District with headquarters at Milenge, Zambia is the most southerly district in the Luapula Province and was carved out of Mansa District. As of the 2022 Zambian Census, the district had a population of 56,543 people. It is rural and undeveloped, lacking roads and infrastructure. Its southern boundary is the Luapula River which divides it from DR Congo and the district lies roughly between the Chembe Ferry to Mansa road in the west and the Kapalala Ferry to Samfya road in the east. A single dirt road runs through the central part of the district from Chembe in the west following the north-west bank of the Lwela River, passing through Milenge Boma, Milambo and Lwela Mission, eventually connecting to the provincial capital, Mansa in the north-west. Most of the population of the district lives along the shallow valley of the Lwela River. The district is gently undulating flat plateau with an elevation of about 1200 m, consisting of woodland and wooded grassland interspersed with dambos.

== Population ==
District population
Area (km^{2})	Pop. 1990 census	Pop. 2000 census	Pop. 2010 census	Pop. 2022 census
6140.8	20,045	28,790	43,649	56,543
