= Mukuku Bridge =

Coordinates: 12°06′55.9″S 29°50′49.7″E

The Mukuku Bridge (also known as the Tuta Bridge) is a road bridge in Samfya District, Luapula Province, Zambia, that traverses the Luapula River and the Bangweulu wetlands. It was commissioned in 1983 and at 2.8 kilometres (1.7 mi) is the longest bridge in Zambia.

== Design and description ==
The Mukuku Bridge carries the Serenje-Mansa Road across the Luapula River and is located in Samfya District in Luapula Province, on the border with Chitambo District in Central Province, and is a major inter-provincial transportation link. It is a low-level concrete bridge supported on multiple piers that crosses an expansive floodplain subject to seasonal inundation. At 2.8 kilometres (1.7 mi) in length, sometimes reported as much as 5 kilometres (3.1 mi), it is the longest bridge in Zambia, second only in Southern Africa to the 3-kilometre (1.9 mi) Maputo–Katembe bridge in Mozambique.

== History and construction ==
The Mukuku Bridge was opened on 19 August 1983 by President Kenneth Kaunda; it was built as part of the then Zambia–China Economic Programme. which also included the Serenje-Mansa Road, now also known as the Tuta Road.

The bridge is a national monument, first declared provisionally in 2019.
