= Pombeiros =

Pombeiros were African and sometimes mulatto agents who purchased slaves in the African interior on behalf of the Portuguese crown or private Portuguese traders for the Atlantic slave trade. The term pombeiro comes from Pumbe, a market located by the Malebo Pool.

In general, the Portuguese government did not want Portuguese slave traders going into the interior. It preferred them to stay at its colonies of Benguela and Luanda on the coast, while the native pombeiros led caravans into the interior to buy slaves. During their trips into the interior, the pombeiros resided at fortified marketplaces called feiras, to which Africans from beyond the frontier would come to sell produce, wares and slaves. According to one account from 1700, the pombeiros would set out with their own slaves, who in turn had slaves under them to act as porters. A slaving expedition could last a whole year and bring in between 400 and 600 slaves.

The most distant feira from the coast was at Kasanje (founded by the Imbangala c. 1620), and the pombeiros rarely ventured further than that. Through the pombeiros, Portugal made indirect contact with the kingdoms beyond the Kingdom of Kongo, such as Lunda and Kazembe. Slaves from Kazembe could be traded to the Lunda, who in turn sold them to the Imbangala, who brought them to the pombeiros at Kasanje. This way the human capital of Kazembe made its way to the Atlantic, whereas the ivory of the kingdom was sent east to the Portuguese feira at Tete for the Indian Ocean trade. In 1806, two pombeiros named Pedro João Baptista and Amaro José travelled from Luanda as far as Tete and back, but the journey took them over four years.
