= Mbereshi Girls' School =

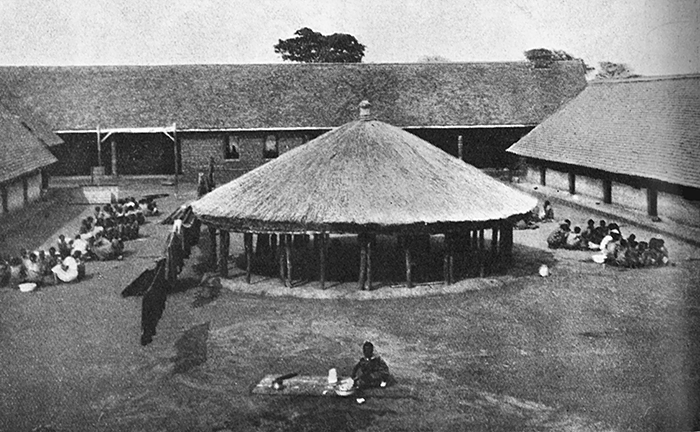
- Mbereshi Girls' School in 1927

Location
- Mbereshi; Northern Rhodesia

Information
- Established: 1915
- Founder: Mabel Shaw
- Closed: 1946
- Gender: Girls

Mbereshi Girls' School was a mission boarding school at Mbereshi. As "the earliest girls' school in Northern Rhodesia ... this school gained an international reputation."

Mbereshi Girls' Boarding School was founded by the missionary Mabel Shaw in 1915, and Shaw served as its Principal until 1940. In 1946 the school was combined with the boy's boarding school to form a new coeducational institution.

== Alumni ==
- Betty Kaunda (1928-2012), First Lady of Zambia
