= Mbereshi River =

River in Zambia

The Mbereshi River (also spelled and pronounced 'Mbeleshi') drains the northern Zambian plateau north of Kawambwa and flows west into the Luapula valley. It enters the Luapula swamps near the Mofwe Lagoon. It gives its name to the village and former mission of Mbereshi situated near its south bank.
