= Chiengi District =

Coordinates: 8.4828°S 28.9347°E

- District
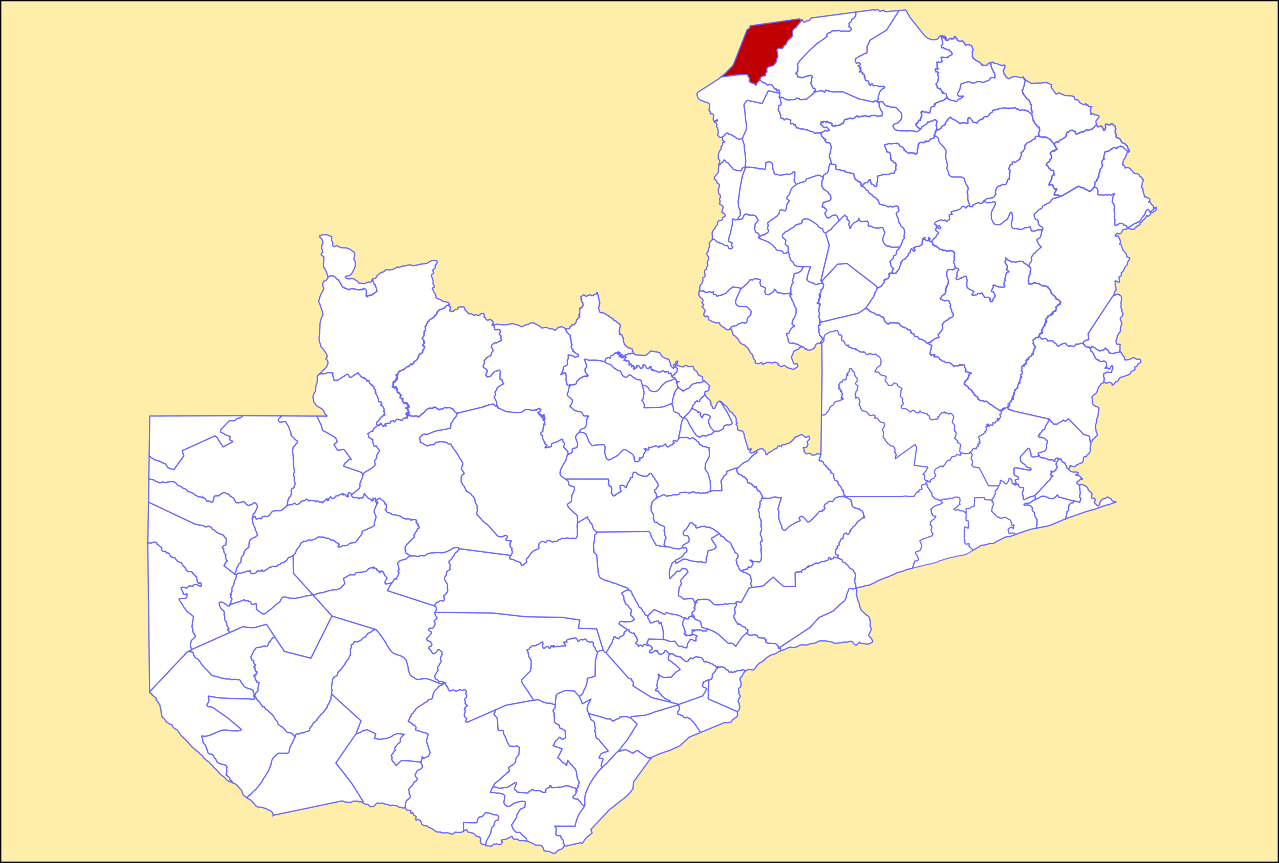
- District location in Zambia
- Country: Zambia
- Province: Luapula Province
- Capital: Chiengi

Area
  - Total: 4,008.4 km^{2} (1,547.7 sq mi)

Population (2022)
  - Total: 189,893
  - Density: 47.374/km^{2} (122.70/sq mi)
- Time zone: UTC+2 (CAT)

Chiengi District with headquarters at Chiengi is the most northerly district in the Luapula Province of Zambia and was carved out of Nchelenge District after Zambia's independence. As of the 2022 Zambian Census, the district had a population of 189,893 people. Most of its population live in fishing villages along the 70 km (approx.) of the north-east shore of Lake Mweru which lies within the district. The largest settlement is Puta, 5 km south of Chiengi town, named after Chief Puta. The district is bounded by the DR Congo border in the north, Kaputa District in the east and the Kalungwishi River in the south.

The eastern edge of the district is a hilly wilderness, partly in the Mweru Wantipa National Park. The hills have always been known for their wildlife, early colonial officers sustained themselves through hunting. The district commissioner's residence had wooden bars on the verandah so that the officer could sit there in the evening while lions roamed through the settlement. Elephants used to be seen on the dambo below the boma, but most of the population in the district have been killed by poachers.

Chiengi District today is undeveloped and suffers from a lack of infrastructure. The main road is of gravel construction and is frequently cut by rains and collapsing bridges; there is no telephone or television service as of 2007 although plans are in hand for a satellite link, subject to securing adequate funding.
