= Phir Milenge =

Phir Milenge (transl. We'll meet again in Hindi) may refer to these Indian films:

- Phir Milenge (1942 film), a social drama by Sohrab Modi
- Phir Milenge (2004 film), a drama directed by Revathi

== See also ==
- "Phir Milenge Chalte Chalte", a 2008 song from Rab Ne Bana Di Jodi
- We'll Meet Again (disambiguation)
- Milenge (disambiguation)
