= Kapalala =

Coordinates: 8°02′S 32°39′E

Kapalala is an administrative ward in Songwe District, Songwe Region, Tanzania. According to the 2002 census, the ward has a total population of 5,924.
