= Lake Mweru =

Lake in Zambia and Congo DR

Lake Mweru Ziwa Mweru
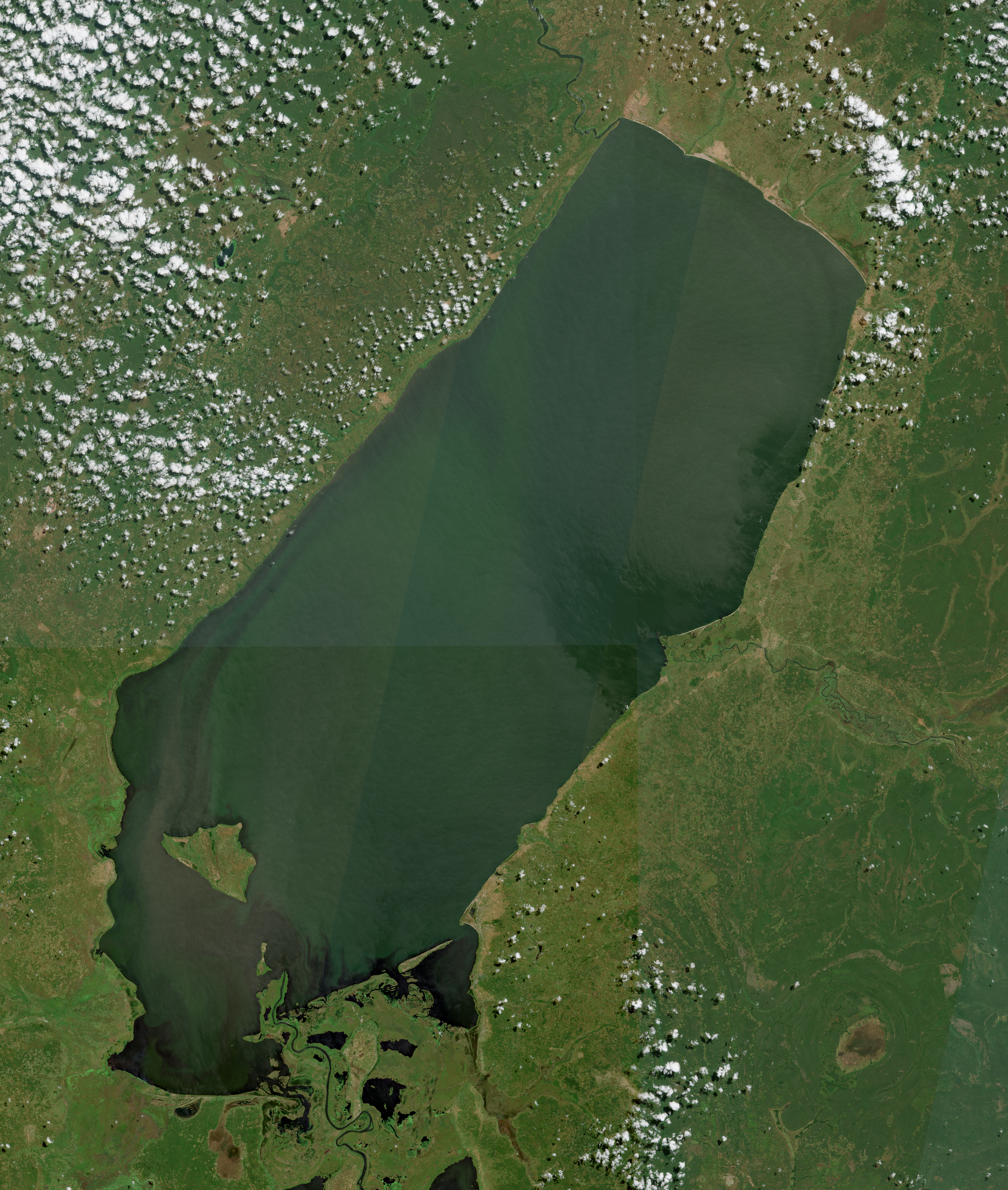
- Lake Mweru on 8 May 2025

- Location within Democratic Republic of the Congo Location within Africa
- Coordinates: 9°00′S 28°43′E
- Type: Rift Valley lakes
- Primary inflows: Luapula River; Kalungwishi River
- Primary outflows: Luvua River
- Basin countries: DR Congo and Zambia
- Max. length: 131 km (81 mi)
- Max. width: 56 km (35 mi)
- Surface area: 5,120 km^{2} (1,980 sq mi)
- Average depth: 7.5 m (25 ft)
- Max. depth: 27 m (89 ft)
- Water volume: 38.2 km^{3} (31,000,000 acre⋅ft)
- Shore length^{1}: 436 km (271 mi)
- Surface elevation: 917 m (3,009 ft)
- Islands: Kilwa Island; Isokwe Island
- Settlements: Nchelenge, Kashikishi, Chiengi, Pweto, Kilwa, Lukonzolwa
- ^{1} Shore length is not a well-defined measure.

Lake Mweru (also spelled Mwelu, Mwero) (French: Lac Moero, Swahili: Ziwa Mweru) is a freshwater lake on the longest arm of Africa's second-longest river, the Congo. Located on the border between Zambia and Democratic Republic of the Congo, it makes up 110 kilometres (68 mi) of the total length of the Congo, lying between its Luapula River (upstream) and Luvua River (downstream) segments.

Mweru means 'lake' in a number of Bantu languages, so it is often referred to as just 'Mweru'.

== Physical geography ==
Mweru is mainly fed by the Luapula River, which comes in through swamps from the south, and the Kalungwishi River from the east. At its north end the lake is drained by the Luvua River, which flows in a northwesterly direction to join the Lualaba River and then to the Congo. It is the second-largest lake in the Congo's drainage basin and is located 150 kilometres (93 mi) west of the southern end of the largest, Lake Tanganyika.

The Luapula forms a swampy delta almost as wide as the southern end of the lake. In a number of respects, the lower river and lake can be treated as one entity. For a lake in a region with pronounced wet and dry seasons, Mweru does not change much in level and area. The annual fluctuation in level is 1.7 metres (5 ft 7 in), with seasonal highs in May and lows in January. This is partly because the Luapula drains out of the Bangweulu Swamps and floodplain which tend to regulate the water flow, absorbing the annual flood and releasing it slowly, and partly because Mweru's outlet, the Luvua, drops quickly and flows swiftly, without vegetation to block it. A rise in Mweru is quickly offset by a faster flow down the Luvua.

Mweru's average length is 118 kilometres (73 mi) and its average width is 45 kilometres (28 mi), with its long axis oriented northeast–southwest. Its elevation is 917 metres (3,009 ft), quite a bit higher than Tanganyika (763 metres (2,503 ft)). It is a rift valley lake lying in the Lake Mweru-Luapula graben, which is a branch of the East African Rift. The western shore of the lake in DR Congo exhibits the steep escarpment typical of a rift valley lake, rising to the Kundelungu Mountains beyond, but the rift valley escarpment is less pronounced on the eastern shore.

Mweru is shallow in the south and deeper in the north, with two depressions in the north-eastern section with maximum depths of 20 and 27 metres (66 and 89 ft).

A smaller very marshy lake called Mweru Wantipa (also known as the Mweru Marshes) lies about 50 kilometres (31 mi) to its east, and north of the Kalungwishi. It is mostly endorheic and actually takes water from the Kalungwishi through a dambo most of the time, but in times of high flood it may overflow into the Kalungwishi and Lake Mweru.

== Human geography ==
=== Exploration ===
The lake was known to Arab and Swahili traders (of ivory, copper and slaves) who used Kilwa Island on the lake as a base at one time. They used trade routes from Zanzibar on the Indian Ocean to Ujiji on Lake Tanganyika to Mweru and then to the Lunda, Luba, Yeke or Kazembe kingdoms, the last being on the southern shores of Mweru. Western trade routes went from those kingdoms to the Atlantic, so Mweru lay on a transcontinental trade route.

Between 1796 and 1831 Portuguese traders/explorers Pereira, Francisco de Lacerda and others visited Kazembe from Mozambique to get treaties to use the trade route between their territories of Mozambique and Angola. The Portuguese must have known of the lake, and the visitors only had to walk to higher ground about 5 kilometres (3.1 mi) north of Kazembe's Kanyembo capital to see the lake 10 kilometres (6.2 mi) distant. However, they were more interested in trade routes than discovery, they had approached from the south and their movements were restricted by Mwata Kazembe, and they did not provide an account of it. Explorer and missionary David Livingstone, who referred to it as 'Moero', is credited with its discovery during his travels of 1867-'8.

Livingstone witnessed the devastation and suffering caused by the slave trade in the area to the north and east of Mweru, and his accounts did help rally opposition to it. The last of the slave trading in the area was as late as the 1890s, however. Meanwhile, between 1870 and 1891, skirmishes and wars between the Yeke king Msiri and neighbouring chiefs and traders unsettled the area. Few Europeans had visited Mweru since Livingstone, until Alfred Sharpe in 1890–1 and the Stairs Expedition in 1892 both passed by on their way to seek treaties with Msiri. The Stairs Expedition killed Msiri and took Katanga for the King Leopold II of Belgium. Sharpe left one of his officers to set up the first colonial outpost in the Luapula-Mweru valley, the British boma at Chiengi in 1891.

=== Historical development ===
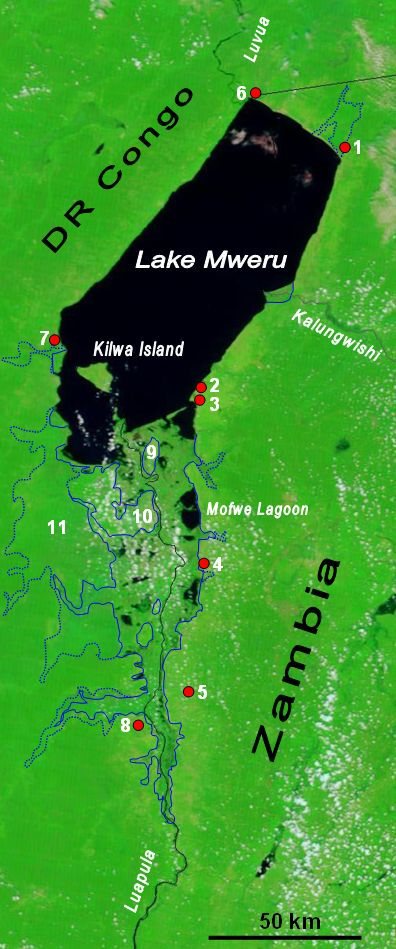
Lake Mweru and its main inlets, the lower Luapula River and its swamps, and the Kalungwishi. Also shown is Mweru's outlet, the Luvua River going on north to the Lualaba and Congo rivers. Water shows up as black in this false-colour NASA satellite image. The extent of the swamps is shown by the solid blue line, and the extent of floodplain is shown as a dotted line. The towns are, in Zambia: 1 Chiengi, 2 Kashikishi, 3 Nchelenge, 4 Mwansabombwe, 5 Mwense; in DR Congo: 6 Pweto, 7 Kilwa, 8 Kasenga. Other features: 9: Chisenga Island, 10 the largest swamp island (in DR Congo), 11 the main floodplain.

The western shore of Luapula-Mweru became part of the Belgian Congo and the eastern shore part of Northern Rhodesia, a British protectorate. Lake Mweru to Tanganyika is an area which was exposed to European influence at a very early date, when the lakes were the chief entrance to Northern Rhodesia. Although Kilwa Island is closer to the western shore, it was allocated to Northern Rhodesia, and consequently Zambia has 58% of the lake waters, and DR Congo 42%.

The first Belgian outposts on the lake were set up at Lukonzolwa and Pweto which were at various times the headquarters of their administration of Katanga. They stamped out the slave trade going north-east around the lake. The first mission station on the lake was established in 1892 by Scottish missionary Dan Crawford of the Plymouth Brethren at Luanza on the Belgian side of the lake.

The British moved their boma from Chiengi to the Kalungwishi, with one or two British officers (such as Blair Watson), and a force of African police. In conjunction with operations around Abercorn further down the trade route, this was enough to end the slave trade going east from Mweru, but not enough to bring Mwata Kazembe under British rule, and a military expedition had to be sent in 1899 from British Central Africa (Nyasaland) to do that job (see the article on Alfred Sharpe for more details).

The move of the boma from Chiengi to Kalungwishi had the effect of leaving the Belgian boma at Pweto a free rein at the northern end of the lake, leading a hundred years later to about 33 square kilometres (13 sq mi) of Zambian territory next to Pweto being ceded to the DR Congo (then Zaire). See the Luapula Province border dispute for further details and references.

After 1900, the Belgian Congo province of Katanga on the western shores of the lake developed faster than the Northern Rhodesian side, the Luapula Province and the town of Kasenga a few hours by boat up the Luapula River became the most developed in the Luapula-Mweru valley, and until the 1960s was the main commercial centre with better services and infrastructure than elsewhere. The Elizabethville mines started up more quickly than those of the Copperbelt, and Kasenga supplied its workforce with fish. Since 1960, political crises, government neglect and wars on the Congolese side have produced a deterioration in infrastructure, while peace on the Zambian side has produced an increase in population and services, causing the balance to change.

=== Centres of population ===
Many fishing villages dot Mweru's shores. A number are seasonal camps. The main towns on the Zambian side are Nchelenge, Kashikishi and Chiengi, and on the DR Congo side, Kilwa (the town opposite the island), Lukonzolwa and Pweto.

Besides Kilwa Island, there are two other inhabited islands in the lake: Zambia's Isokwe Island of 3 square kilometres (1.2 sq mi), and a 2 square kilometres (0.77 sq mi) Congolese island next to the mouth of the Luapula. (Two other islands in the Luapula swamps have shores on the lake).

The Congolese side of the lake was affected by the Second Congo War of 1999–2003, from which it is still recovering. Many refugees entered Zambia at Pweto and were accommodated in camps in Mporokoso and Kawambwa districts.

=== Transport ===
The Belgians operated a regular service by a paddle steamer, the Charles Lemaire, between Kasenga on the Luapula and Pweto at the outlet of the Luvua River, a distance of nearly 300 kilometres (190 mi) if a stop at Kilwa was included. Boats still ply that route today. Water transport is less used on the Zambian side, except to Kilwa Island, Isokwe Island and Chisenga Island (in the Luapula swamps).

The Mweru area was served only by dirt roads until the main Luapula Province road on the Zambian side was tarred to Nchelenge in 1987; the population around the lake has grown, much of it exploiting the rich fishery of the lake. When the Copperbelt mines shed workers in the 1980s and 1990s, many ex-miners relocated to the lake shores, particularly around Nchelenge-Kashikishi.

The dirt roads on the Congolese side have been neglected and are in poor condition, and many people cross into Zambia to travel by road. See Congo Pedicle road for more details.

=== Fishery ===
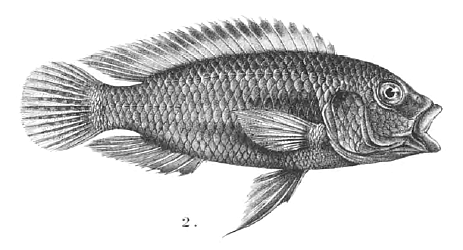
Drawing of a syntype of Thoracochromis moeruensis (Boulenger, 1899), a haplochromine cichlid from Lake Mweru

Mweru has always been noted for its longfin tilapia, (Oreochromis macrochir), called pale ('pa-lay') in Chibemba, which traditionally were dried on racks or mats in the sun and packed in baskets for market. (Smoking and salting fish are more recent processes in the area). Catfish (one species of which grows up to 2 metres (6 ft 7 in) in length), a kind of carp, tigerfish, elephantfish and sardine-like fish are also caught.

Commercial fishing on Lake Mweru and the Luapula River was pioneered by Greek fishermen from the Dodecanese islands who settled in Kasenga, DR Congo, on the western bank of the Luapula 150 kilometres (93 mi) upriver from the lake in the first half of the 20th Century. They used boats built in Greek style powered by charcoal-fuelled steam engines, later replaced with diesel. They supplied the workforce of the copper mines in Lubumbashi (later the whole Copperbelt) with fish which was packed in ice at Kasenga and transported from there in trucks. It was estimated in 1950 there were 50 Greek boats catching 4,000 short tons (3,600 t) of fresh fish per year. It would take a week for a boat to do the round trip to the lake and fill its hold, lined with ice carried on board.

In recent decades the catch has declined due to over-fishing and is estimated at 13,000 long tons (13,000 t) tonnes caught from 4,500 small craft, mainly plank boats. Congolese fishermen catch the most despite having a slightly smaller share of the waters. The Tilapia are caught by gill nets, and do not reach the size they once did. Since the 1980s, 'chisense' fishing increased. This method is used to catch small pelagic fish called kapenta, originally from beaches but now using lights on boats at night to attract the fish which are then scooped up in fine nets.

=== Mining ===
The Dikulushi Copper Mine is an open-cast mine 50 kilometres (31 mi) north of Kilwa in DR Congo by dirt road, and 23 kilometres (14 mi) west of the lake. The mine was sold by Anvil Mining to Mawson West, an Australian company, in March 2010. When the mine is operating, heavy trucks carrying concentrate cross Mweru on a large motorised pontoon ferry from Kilwa to Nchelenge, a distance of 44 kilometres (27 mi), then drive 2,500 kilometres (1,600 mi) to a copper smelter in Tsumeb, Namibia.

=== Tourism ===
Lake Mweru is undeveloped for tourism despite being regarded as "truly beautiful". Lack of access in the past, a lack of wildlife conservation, and wars in DR Congo between 1996 and 2003 have not helped. 60 years ago the western and northern shores of the lake were home to large herds of elephant, the Luapula floodplain supported herds of lechwe, and the Lusenga Plain National Park and Mweru Wantipa National Park were noted for Cape buffalo, a great variety of antelope and lion. Most animal populations have been reduced by hunting, loss of habitat, and poaching. On the Zambian side perhaps only Mweru Wantipa National Park has tourism potential. On the Congolese side the Parc National de Kundelungu in the mountains 75 kilometres (47 mi) south-west of the lake may be in better condition.

== See also ==
- Rift Valley lakes
- Luapula River
- Luvua River
- Kalungwishi River
- Kazembe
- Katanga Province
- Msiri
- Lake Mweru Wantipa
- Luapula Province border dispute
- Luapula Province
