= Mwansabombwe District =

Coordinates: 9°53′S 28°47′E

- District
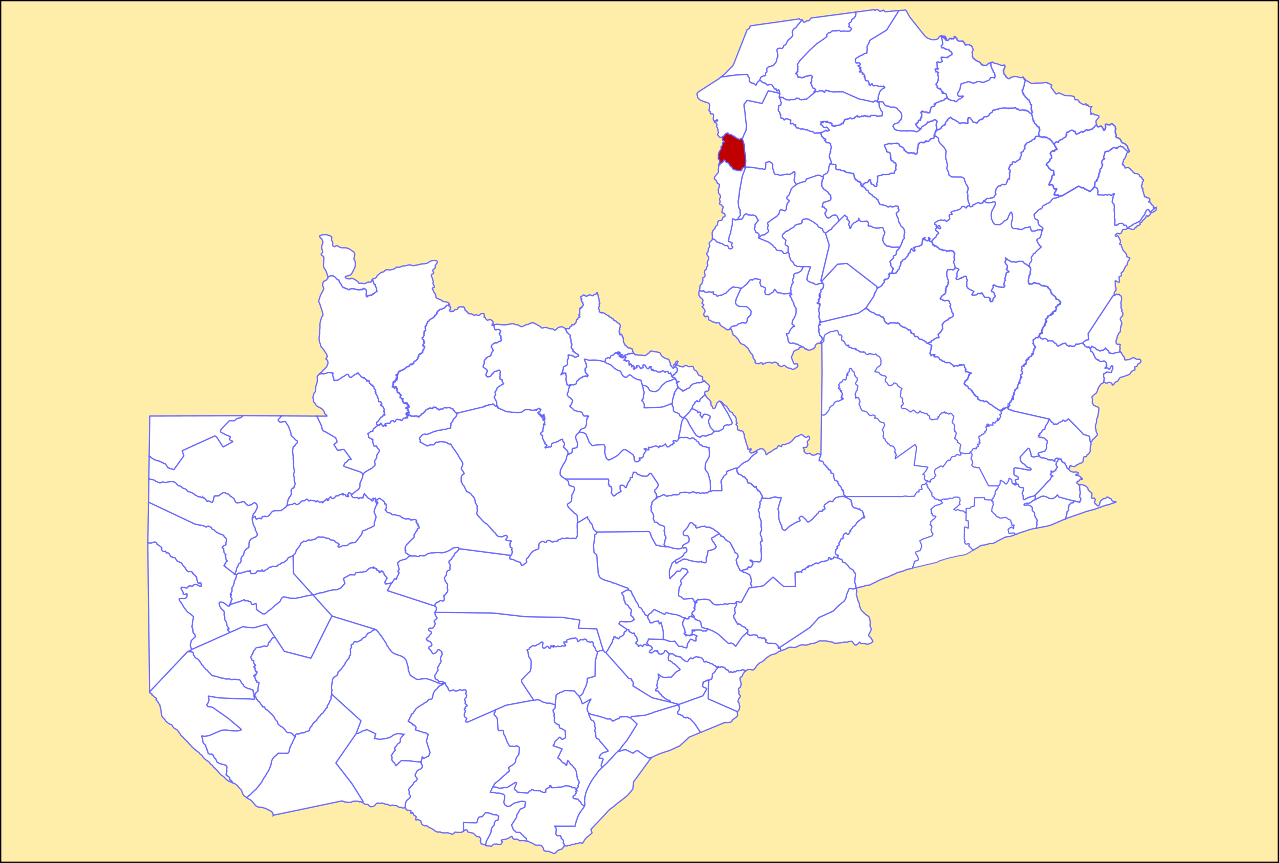
- District location in Zambia
- Country: Zambia
- Province: Luapula Province

Area
  - Total: 1,187.3 km^{2} (458.4 sq mi)

Population (2022)
  - Total: 58,919
  - Density: 49.624/km^{2} (128.53/sq mi)
- Time zone: UTC+2 (CAT)

Mwansabombwe District is a district of Luapula Province, Zambia. The seat of the district is Mwansabombwe. It was separated from Kawambwa District in 2012. As of the 2022 Zambian Census, the district had a population of 58,919 people.
