= Luapula Province border dispute =

This article deals with the disputed area on the borders of the Democratic Republic of the Congo and Zambia, in Luapula Province.

== Origins in the 1894 treaty ==
Zambia's formal northern frontier boundary was legally signed in the Anglo-Belgian Treaty of 1894, long after the 1884 Berlin Conference. This showed that the triangle of land at the northwestern point of Eastern Rhodesia from Pweto to as far south as the Lunchinda River was under Northern Rhodesia even though the Belgian Congo had administered it for many years. Belgians administered it as a matter of local convenience under a gentleman’s agreement. Much of this administration was facilitated by the Belgium missionary work in education and health, particularly the Roman Catholic Church and Greek fishermen who wanted more fishing points to supply the reported increase in demand for fish in the emerging mine town of Elizabethville (now Lubumbashi). Later, the Belgians wanted to claim this land. Over the years, during British colonial rule, District Commissioners and Provincial Commissioners were asked to provide information on the affected areas by central government authorities in Lusaka.

The real border issue for the Northern Frontier was reported to be on Lake Tanganyika's Cape Akalunga, mentioned in the treaty and described as the point of reference. In reality, officials had found it difficult to locate this cape. British maps show the boundary meeting at Cape Pungu (Chitankwa) whilst Belgian maps of 1955 show the meeting point at Cape Kipimbi which is far south of Cape Pungu, thereby cutting deep into assumed Northern Rhodesian territory.

During the time of the Central African Federation, the Northern-Rhodesian Federal government’s Assistant Secretary Fraser, believed that there may be mineral deposits in Pweto area and therefore all the more need for the Federal Government to protect sovereignty. Weedens Minerals & Chartered Exploration held prospecting rights in that area. These have never been challenged. There is documentation that in 1936, Belgians had asked for 180 acres (730,000 m^{2}) of Northern Rhodesian land apparently where Belgian colonial residences were built. However, no evidence exists that Britain conceded to this request. In 1957, A V Ellison, an official in the Ministry of Lands & Local Government reported to the Federal government of Northern Rhodesia that triangulation surveys had been made by the Anglo-Belgian Boundary Commission from 1911–1913, when eventually a de facto boundary for the northern frontier was agreed upon. That boundary clearly indicates that Pweto was the northwestern point of reference for the northern frontier.

== Belgian interests ==
In 1931 another British/Belgian Boundary Commission was set up. A Peake/Gendarme agreement was proposed. It was suggested that a meandering line following the watershed and thalwegs of the streams replace the straight line between Lake Mweru and Lake Tanganyika. This exchange was to favour Northern Rhodesia but was consequently rejected by the Belgians. In July 1958 Thomson, District Commissioner who visited Chief Puta’s area, noted an influx of the populace from the area occupied by Belgians into Northern Rhodesia. They were running away from compulsory agricultural measures in Pweto’s area. The fact is that these were not refugees in the sense the term is used today. They were resisting the brutal Belgium occupation, under which they had been left without British protection. Distance and cost was the simplest excuse that British authorities in Northern Rhodesia could offer for not protecting them. After all, apart from the mining companies, the British definition of its interests in Northern Rhodesia were at best ambivalent, apart from occupying a piece of real estate.

On 8 August 1958, a preparatory meeting for the Belgian government and the Federal Government of Rhodesia & Nyasaland to discuss the Northern Rhodesia/Congo boundary was convened. Present at the meeting representing Northern Rhodesian interests were:

- A W Osminara – Assistant Secretary and Chair
- W H H Jones – Acting Solicitor General
- T W Fraser – Assistant Secretary (W)
- P W W Allin – Surveyor General
- S G Burlock – Acting Land Commissioner
- M S Wagner – Assistant Secretary (R)
- J C L Durrant – Acting Assistant Secretary (N)
- G Howe – Administrative Officer
- F N N Parry – Federal Government representative
- M S Benoy –

Belgium interests in the north appeared to be fishing and hunting in the Lake Mweru region, and possession of Kilwa Island. A joint Mweru-Luapula fisheries agreement was made between Northern Rhodesia and Belgium Congo with regards to:

- Type of nets used
- Fishing rights
- Off-season responsibilities

At this meeting, maps and plans of the areas concerned were discussed. Northern Rhodesia needed the Pedicle Road that connects Luapula Province to the Copperbelt. (The Pedicle is a wedge of Congolese territory that cuts deep into Zambia to give the country its distinctive butterfly shape.) Belgians were not interested in the road, but were using it as a bargaining tool for other border issues. The Federal Government initially wanted to put a railway through to Luapula as suggested by the Mufulira Copper Mines Ltd. To build a railway, however, meant the land had to be under Federal government control. Parry also saw the advantage of linking the Rhodesian railway system with that of the Congo. At this point in the colonial period, the rights of native inhabitants were considered insignificant and not worthy of consultation.

While the Federal Government wanted control over the pedicle, the Belgians wanted to swop territory in their favour. The meeting decided to propose the following:

- The Northern Rhodesia government would exchange land on the northwest boundary in the Lubemba area for some of the Mokambo land held by the Belgians. This could have conceded Pweto to Congo.

However, no such swap actually took place in any formal treaty. The Mokambo pedicle remained Belgium Congo territory and yet they still occupied the northern frontier. In effect, a de facto occupation continued without their making any concession.

In the same year, 1958, D F Smith, District Assistant and a team of 11 Africans (2 of whom claimed to know where Cape Akalunga was) visited Mporokoso area to

- Find out the populace
- Find Cape Akalunga

He visited 11 villages. He met with Chief Mulilo who told him Cape Akalunga was near Chisenga River and had once been called Mutunga village. It had been under Congolese rule.

== 22 December 1958 ==
British Consulate General in Leopoldville wrote to the Federal Government Minister of External Affairs in Salisbury. He noted that as the frontier between Rhodesia and the Belgian Congo was situated in Lake Mweru and on the thalweg of the Luapula in a part of its course, it was appropriate for each of the riparian states to exercise their sovereign rights in the waters falling respectively under their jurisdiction.

The maps showed the frontier deviating from the centre of the lake and passing to the west of Kilwa Island which, the Belgians said, was a peninsula attached to Belgian territory.

In the same year, 1958, Mr Bowles visited Brussels and discussed the border issues with M. Grosjean, Inspector General in the Ministry of Foreign Affairs. No detailed records are available on this meeting, save to note that the frantic efforts between the British and Belgian authorities were taking place precisely at the time when the struggle for independence of the two states, particularly Congo, were getting intense. Congo gained independence in 1960; Northern Rhodesia got it four years later. In 1958 the British settlers were holding on to the territory and were keen to ensure that no land that they claimed to be theirs was surrendered to natives in the Congo.

== 17 April 1961 ==
Provincial Commissioner E L Button had, in response to a query about the boundary between Lake Mweru and Lake Tanganyika, commented thus: "Despite the rather nebulous nature of a common boundary, no administrative difficulties had been caused by it, and as such it would be better to let sleeping dogs lie." Nothing in diplomacy could be as irresponsible as this statement on the question of sovereignty over land, as the case of the submerging Kasikili/Sedudu island issue between Namibia and Botswana in recent years shows. In other words, this Briton was now quite happy to concede Zambian territory to the Congo as a matter of convenience when that was not the case when the British or their proxies were ruling the territory.

== 29 April 1961 ==
Acting Administrative Secretary wrote to the Governor of Northern Rhodesia. He informed the Governor that there were 4 enclaves that were under the Belgian administration, Mpweto- Lunchinda included. The residents were forced to carry Congolese identity cards and been fully subjected to Belgian rule. Chiefs who were living within the sphere of Belgian control provided tribal control.

== February 1965 ==
There was a border incident on Luapula River, the details of which were not fully recorded. Since both Congo and Zambia had now gained independence, this incident was between two new republics dealing with an issue left over from the colonial period.

== 30 April 1965 ==
Education Minister John Mwanakatwe and Alex Shapi visited Mweru constituency. They were held at gunpoint and manhandled by the Congolese (Katangese) gendarmes after crossing the Lunchinda River at Chipungu. Despite explaining who they were, they were accused of being in Congolese territory. It was not until the following day that a senior Congolese official who spoke Chibemba saved them and apologised for their mistreatment. They crossed the Lunchinda in the knowledge that they were still in Zambian territory, as the maps showed. At this time, there was no clinic at Chipungu, so many Zambians sought medical facilities from the Congolese hospital at Mpweto. Even the Belgium Congolese franc was accepted currency in Chipungu area itself, as it was in Pweto. The fact was, Mwanakatwe was legitimately visiting his constituency, as far as the Zambian map showed.

== 30 September 1966 ==
Two English geologists, Dr Premoli and Dr Bratley, and 22 Zambians were to undertake geological investigations on the coast of Lake Tanganyika between Moliro and Nsumbu bay. They were arrested by the Congolese (Katangese) gendarme and their maps were confiscated. Congo was at war. The Zambian maps showed that this area was Zambian territory.

== November 1966 ==
In Zambia, the Permanent Secretary in the Ministry of Lands wrote to the Permanent Secretary in the Ministry of Foreign Affairs giving reference to the Mpweto/Lake Tanganyika boundary. He pointed out that since the border was not clearly established, negotiation was necessary and suggested the setting of a Joint Boundary Commission.

The Surveyor General, D J B Copeland, in a letter dated 18 August 1966, recalled a boundary incident that had occurred in 1961. Surveyors sent by De Beers Prospecting Ltd had an incident near Mpweto with Congolese officials. The surveyors were accused of being in Congo territory and of illegally prospecting for Congolese gold in Moba territory. This confusion was caused by the following definition of the border.

- Belgian border coordinates South latitude 8 degrees 18 minutes
- British border coordinates South latitude 8 degrees 14 minutes

The Police report showed that they had been arrested at the Chisenga River near Chipunelu.

== 30 September 1967 ==
Foreign Affairs Assistant Secretary Lishomwa Muuka suggested the need for a boundary commission to discuss the dispute over:

- The Congolese claim of 8 degrees 18 minutes south
- The Zambian claim of 8 degrees 15 minutes south

He saw the need to clarify whether the point was Cape Akalunga or Cape Kipimbi. He wrote to the British High Commissioner for information on the true boundary, but was told there was none available, despite their having been discussions on the delimitation of the boundary in 1927 and 1933 . The British, it appeared had washed their hands of the issue and were not bothered at all if the two countries went to war over a border dispute which they had themselves defended for so many years.

== 1968 ==
The Congolese disputed air space and flying rights over Nippon Mining that had concession rights over Chipushi.

== 1980s ==
In the 1980s, Zaire repeatedly occupied portions of the Luapula Province, as much as 30 km (19 mi) inside Zambia's border.
