= Francisco de Lacerda =

Portuguese explorer

Dr Francisco José de Lacerda e Almeida (c. 1753 – 18 October 1798) was a colonial Brazilian-born Portuguese explorer in the 18th century.

He was the son of Portuguese captain José António de Lacerda and Francisca de Almeida Pais.

"He spent ten years in Brazil, where he discovered new species of plants and animals, along with Indian tribes previously unknown to Europeans."

In 1798, he led a Portuguese expedition to the Kazembe region of Zambia. After his death on this mission, the group was led by Francisco Pinto.

== Works ==
- Instructions and Travel Diary that Governor Francisco Joze de Lacerda e Almeida Wrote about His Travel to the Center of Africa, Going to the River of Sena, in the Year of 1798. 1798.
