= Dambo =

Class of complex shallow wetlands

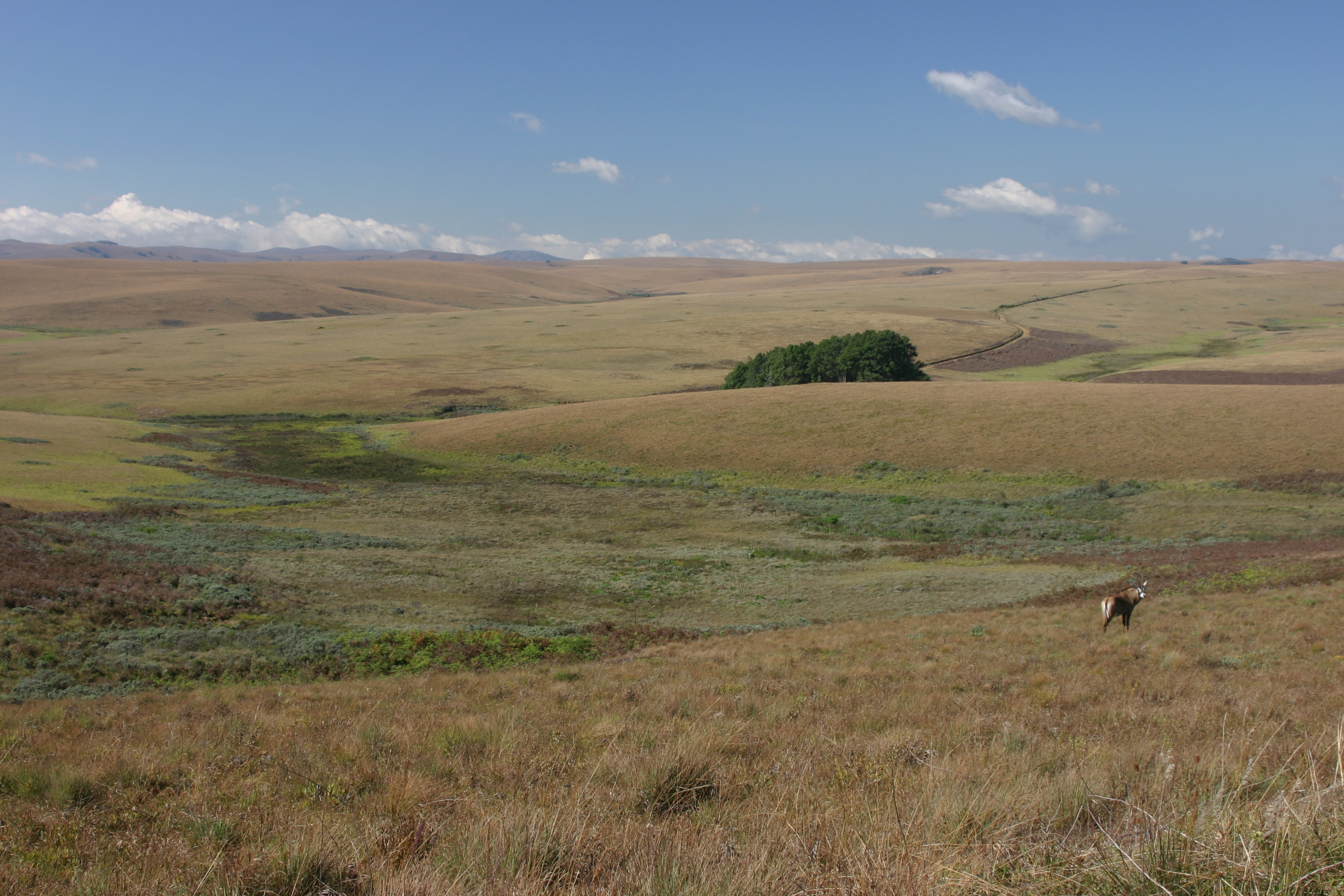
A dambo of the Nyika Plateau in Malawi

A dambo is a class of complex shallow wetlands in central, southern and eastern Africa, particularly in Zambia, Malawi and Zimbabwe. They are generally found in higher-rainfall flat plateau areas and have river-like branching (dendritic) forms which in themselves are not very large but combined add up to a large area. Dambos have been estimated to comprise 10–12% of the area of Zambia. Similar African words include mbuga (commonly used in East Africa), matoro (Mashonaland), vlei (South Africa), fadama (Nigeria), and bolis (Sierra Leone); the French bas-fond and German Spültal have also been suggested as referring to similar grassy wetlands.

== Characteristics ==
Dambos are characterised by grasses and sedges and include forbs and occasionally rushes, but no woody plants, contrasting with surrounding woodland such as miombo woodland. They may be substantially dry at the end of the dry season, revealing grey soils or black clays, but unlike a flooded grassland, they retain wet lines of drainage through the dry season. They are inundated (waterlogged) in the wet season but not generally above the height of the vegetation, and any open water surface is usually confined to streams and small ponds or lagoons at the lowest point generally near the centre.

The name dambo is most frequently used for wetlands on flat plateaus which form the headwaters of streams. The definition for scientific purposes of a headwater dambo has been proposed as "seasonally waterlogged, predominantly grass covered, depressions bordering headwater drainage lines". A 1998 report of the Food and Agriculture Organization distinguishes between 'hydromorphic/phreatic' dambos (associated with headwaters) and 'fluvial' dambos (associated with rivers). The report contains a number of definitions such as "a wide and low lying gently sloping treeless grass covered depression, which is seasonally waterlogged by seepage from surrounding high ground assisted by rainfall and has water tables for most part of the year in the upper 50-100 cm of the soil profile from which they drain into streams'. A variety of definitions have been used for specific regions and geomorphological types, some with land use included in the definition.

The flatness of the terrain where dambos form limits channel erosion and promotes sheet flow, groundwater storage and sediment retention, so streams and rivers emerging from dambos are characteristically clear and carry relatively low suspended-sediment loads compared with large alluvial rivers.

== Dambo soils ==
Across much of Central Africa, dambos are bordered by higher ground with well-drained red soils, typically covered by miombo woodland. The soil colour comes from insoluble iron oxides, such as hematite (ferric oxide), formed in well-drained, oxygen-rich conditions. In the seasonally waterlogged dambo soils, oxygen is depleted and the ferric iron (Fe^{3+}) is reduced to the more soluble grey ferrous (Fe^{2+}) form, which leaches out, and the other minerals remaining (quartz sand, kaolinite clay, and silica) are pale or grey. The dambo soils tend to be more acidic but this results from other complex processes such as organic matter accumulation and slow decomposition.

== Hydrology ==
Dambos are fed by rainfall which drains out slowly to feed streams and are therefore a vital part of the water cycle. As well as being complex ecosystems, they also play a role in the biodiversity of the region.

There is a popular idea that dambos act like sponges to soak up the wet season rain which they release slowly into rivers during the dry season thus ensuring a year-round flow, but this is opposed by some research which suggests that in the middle to late dry season the water is actually released from aquifers. Springs are seen in some dambos. Thus it may take a long time—perhaps several years—for water from a heavy rainy season to percolate through hills and emerge in a dambo, creating lagoons there or a flow in downstream rivers which cannot be explained by the previous year's rainfall. Dambos may be involved, for instance, in explaining puzzling variations in water level or flow in Lake Mweru Wantipa and Lake Chila in Mbala.

== Use ==
Traditionally, dambos have been exploited:

- as a dry-season water source
- for rushes used as thatching and fencing material
- for clay used for building, brick-making and earthenware
- for hunting (especially birds and small antelope)
- for growing vegetables and other food crops, which can be vital in drought years since dambo soils usually retain enough moisture to produce a harvest when the rains fail
- for soaking bitter cassava in dug ponds
- for fishing (generally using fish traps) in those dambos with streams
- for dry-season grazing of cattle; although dambos don't generally support as many grazers as other grassland plains, dambo soil stays damp well into the dry season and enables fresh grass growth.

More recently, they have been used for fish ponds and growing upland rice. Efforts to develop dambos agriculturally have been hampered by a lack of research on the hydrology and soils of dambos, which have proved to be variable and complex. The acidic soils of dambos have been noted by wildlife ecologists such as Fraser Darling to carry fewer grazers than other grasslands.

== Examples ==
A headwater dambo can be seen at 11°28′S 28°54′E (30 km south of Mansa, Zambia) in a forest reserve. Unlike in the neighbouring areas which have been cleared for farming and charcoal-burning, the dambo contrasts well with the undisturbed miombo woodland canopy. Headwater dambos have a branching structure like rivers. Most of the dambos have roughly the same width and form the same sort of pattern.

A fluvial dambo of the Mbereshi River where it enters the swamps of the Luapula River can be seen at 09°43′30″S 28°46′00″E.

An example of a pan dambo can be seen at 16°22.003′S 24°18.580′E (102 km north-west of Mulobezi, Zambia). The water in the pan has dried out, and the grass has been burnt off giving the dark appearance at the centre of the dambo. To the east and west of the pan dambo a series of dambos can be seen along two river courses.
