= Chreso University =

University in Zambia

- Other names: CU
- Motto: Meeting Educational Needs of Today
- Type: Private
- Established: 15 January 2010 (16 years ago)
- Founders: Chreso Ministries
- Chancellor: Helmut Reutter
- Vice-Chancellor: Christopher Simoonga
- Administrative staff: 200
- Students: 3000
- Location: Lusaka, Zambia; 15°40′09″S 28°32′59″E
- Campus: 4 urban campuses
Colours
- Website: www.chresouniversity.edu.zm

Chreso University (CU) is a non-profit private higher-education institution located in the urban setting of the metropolis of Lusaka, Zambia. Established in 2010, this institution also has a branch campus in Ndola. Officially recognized by the Ministry of Higher Education of Zambia, Chreso University (CU) is a small (uniRank enrollment range: 2,000-2,999 students) coeducational Zambian higher education institution. Chreso University offers courses and programs leading to officially recognized higher education degrees such as pre-bachelor's degrees (i.e. certificates, diplomas, associate or foundation), bachelor's degrees, master's degrees, doctorate degrees in several areas of study. This institution has a selective admission policy based on students' past academic records. The admission rate range is 50-60% making this Zambian higher education organization an averagely selective institution. International applicants are eligible to apply for enrollment. CU also provides several academic and non-academic facilities and services to students including a library, housing, sports facilities, financial aids and/or scholarships, study abroad and exchange programs, online courses and distance learning opportunities, as well as administrative services.

== Campus ==
Its main campus, the City Campus, is in Lusaka along the Nangwenya Road, about 6 km from the CBD. It also has the Makeni Campus about 55 km west-south-west of Lusaka (near Nampundwe) and the Ndola Campus in Ndola. Chreso University delivers its full-time studies in these five departments:

- Business
- Education
- Social sciences
- Health sciences
- Hospitality

== Organisation ==
The university is divided into the following faculties:

Business
Faculty Of Business & Financial Management
* Business Administration
* BBA with Education

Education
Faculty Of Education
* BSc with Education
* BA Of Primary Education
* BA with Education
* DIPLOMA - Secondary Education
* DIPLOMA - Primary Education
* DIPLOMA - Early Childhood Education

Social sciences
Faculty Of Social Sciences & Theology
* BA Of Theology
* BA Of Leadership & Practical Theology
* BA Of Social Work
* BA Of Psychology & Counselling

Health sciences
Faculty Of Health Sciences
* BSc in Nursing
* BSc in Public Health
* Diploma in Clinical Medicine

Hospitality
Faculty Of Hospitality
* Diploma in Food Production
* Diploma in General Hospitality

== See also ==
- List of universities in Zambia
- Education in Zambia
