= Kilwa Island =

Island on Lake Mweru, Zambia

Coordinates: 9°16′S 28°27′E

Kilwa Island is a lake island in the Zambian part of Lake Mweru. The nearest mainland shore is in the Democratic Republic of the Congo (DR Congo) to the east, by the town of Kilwa. The island was used a base by Arab and Swahili traders of ivory, copper and slaves, who named it after Kilwa Kisiwani ('Kilwa Island') on the ocean coast of modern Tanzania. According to recent Zambian government reports, the population of the island is around 18,000. The area is around 60 km^{2}.

At times, the island has housed a substantial population of refugees from the DR Congo. Prior to 2010, the UNHCR and Zambian government had operated two refugee camps on the island, before shutting them down as the number of refugees decreased.
