= Nchelenge =

- Town
- Location in Zambia
- Coordinates: 9°21′12″S 28°44′25″E
- Country: Zambia
- Province: Luapula Province
- District: Nchelenge District
- Elevation: 3,130 ft (954 m)

Nchelenge is a town in the Luapula Province of northern Zambia, lying on the south eastern shore of Lake Mweru. It is contiguous with Kashikishi, and they are sometimes referred to as Nchelenge-Kashikishi. Nchelenge is the administrative centre for the Zambian part of Lake Mweru, being the seat of the district government and branches of national agencies, while Kashikishi is the market and fisheries centre. Nchelenge attained District status in 1997 when it was upgraded from being a sub-District structure of the Kawambwa District in Luapula.

Ferries sail from Nchelenge to Kilwa Island and Isokwe. In 2001 a large motorised barge was launched to carry trucks laden with concentrated copper ore from the Dikulushi Mine in DR Congo across Lake Mweru to Nchelenge, from where they travel to Namibia.

The principal highway of the Luapula Province ends its tarred surface at Nchelenge-Kashikishi, providing good communication southwards to Mansa and the Great North Road at Serenje. Northwards a dirt road continues to Chiengi and Zambia's border with DR Congo.

== Notable people ==
- Given Katuta Mwelwa
