= Kasenga =

Coordinates: 10.372°S 28.614°E

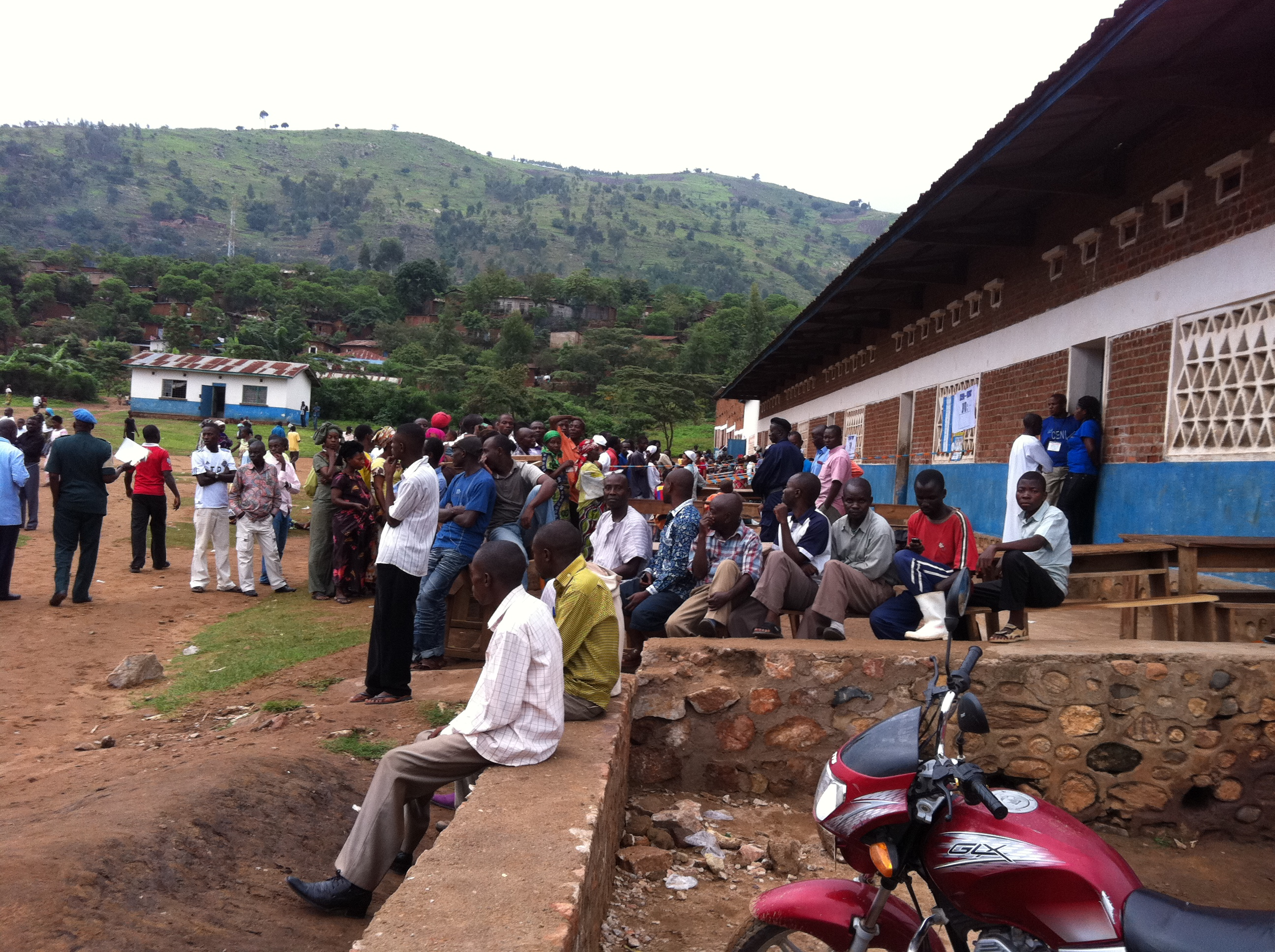

Kasenga is a town in Kasenga territory of Haut-Katanga province of the Democratic Republic of the Congo. It is located in south of Lake Mweru, approximately 135 miles (217 km) north-east of Lubumbashi., near the border with Zambia.
