= Kashikishi =

Kashikishi Kasikisi, Kasnikishi
- Populated place
- Location in Zambia
- Coordinates: 9°18′30″S 28°44′9″E
- Country: Zambia
- Province: Luapula Province
- District: Nchelenge District

Kashikishi is a town on the south-eastern shore of Lake Mweru in the Luapula Province of Zambia. It lies just north of the district headquarters Nchelenge, and close enough for them to be considered twin towns; they are sometimes referred to as Nchelenge–Kashikishi.

While Nchelenge is the seat of the district government and branches of national agencies, Kashikishi is the market and fisheries centre. It is also the site of a government secondary school and St Paul's Catholic Mission, which includes the largest hospital in the Nchelenge District.

The principal highway of the Luapula Province ends its tarred surface at Nchelenge-Kashikishi, providing good communication southwards with Mansa and Serenje. Northwards a dirt road continues to Chiengi and Zambia's border with DR Congo.

As of 1976, Kashikishi had a population of approximately 1,500.
