= Nchelenge District =

- District
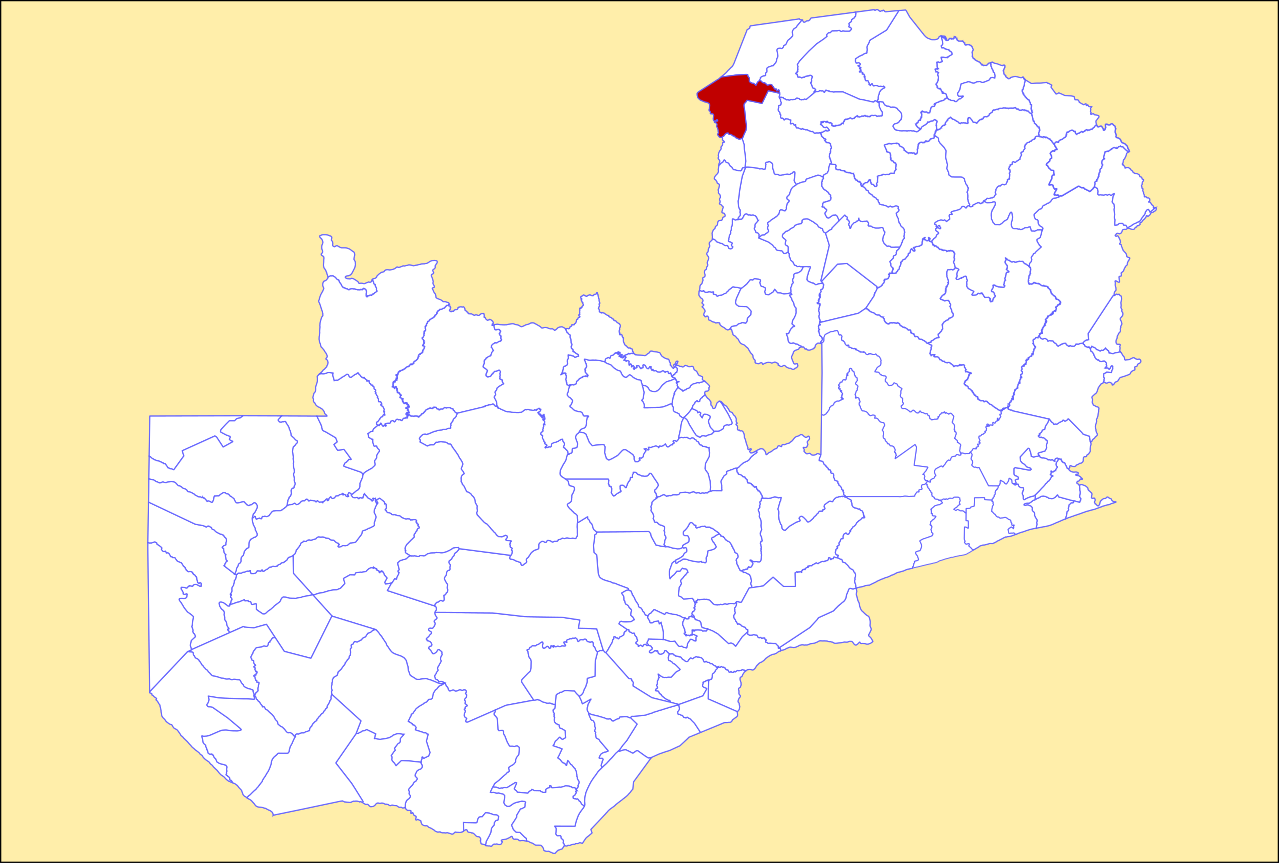
- District location in Zambia
- Coordinates: 9°00′S 29°00′E
- Country: Zambia
- Province: Luapula Province
- Capital: Nchelenge

Area
  - Total: 4,147.8 km^{2} (1,601.5 sq mi)

Population (2022)
  - Total: 233,696
  - Density: 56.342/km^{2} (145.93/sq mi)
- Time zone: UTC+2 (CAT)

Nchelenge District is a district of Zambia, located in the Luapula Province. The capital lies at Nchelenge. As of the 2022 Zambian Census, the district had a population of 233,696 people.

== Socio-economic profile ==
The native inhabitants of Nchelenge are mainly fishers or fishmongers. Due to overfishing, there has been a shift to farming in the past few years to meet people's basic economic needs. The selling of fish and timber, as well as general trading, comprise the main economic activities carried out by people, accounting for some 80 percent of the workforce. The remaining 20 percent are formally employed workers mostly in government departments and various non-governmental organizations in the area.

Banking services are offered by the National Savings Bank and the Zambia National Commercial Bank; the latter operating as a mobile bank twice weekly from Kawambwa district, located about 90 kilometers from Nchelenge district.

== Chiefs ==
The district has three chiefs: Chief Kambwali, Chieftainess Kanyembo and Chief Nshimba.
