= Luapula River =

Tributary of the Congo River

Coordinates: 9.41384°S 28.52188°E

The Luapula River is the middle stretch in red.

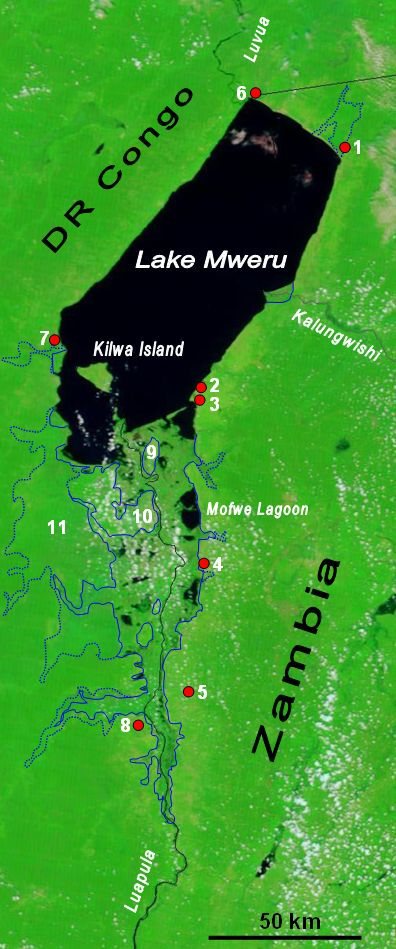
The Luapula (bottom) forms a swampy delta where it enters Lake Mweru (center, in black), as shown in this false-colour NASA satellite image. Blue lines mark the swamp and its islands (9, 10); a dotted line marks the river's floodplain (11). Red dots (1–8) are towns. See note for full legend. (Note: Towns in Zambia (1–5): 1 Chiengi, 2 Kashikishi, 3 Nchelenge, 4 Mwansabombwe, and 5 Mwense Towns in DR Congo (6–8): 6 Pweto, 7 Kilwa, 8 Kasenga. Other features (9–11): 9 Chisenga Island, 10 the largest swamp island (in DR Congo), 11 the main floodplain.)

The Luapula River is a north-flowing river of central Africa, within the Congo River watershed. (Note: The Luapula is not part of the Congo River itself, but some sources use the Luapula and its tributary, the Chambeshi, to measure the furthest length of the Congo River system.) It rises in the wetlands of Lake Bangweulu (Zambia), which are fed by the Chambeshi River. The Luapula flows west then north, marking the border between Zambia and the Democratic Republic of the Congo before emptying into Lake Mweru. The river gives its name to Zambia's Luapula Province.

== Source and upper Luapula ==
The Luapula drains Lake Bangweulu and its swamps into which flows the Chambeshi River, the source of the Congo. There is no single clear channel connecting the two rivers and the lake, but a mass of shifting channels, lagoons and swamps, as the explorer David Livingstone found to his cost. (He died exploring the area, and one of his last acts was to question Chief Chitambo about the course of the Luapula.) The channel boldly marked as the 'Luapula' and confidently shown on many maps flowing south out of Lake Bangweulu at 11°25'S 29°49'E can be seen on satellite images such as Google Earth to actually peter out into green vegetation around 11°46'S 29°48'E.

The Mukuku Bridge carries the Serenje-Mansa Road across the Bangweulu Wetlands.

Below the Bangweulu swamps and floodplain, the Luapula flows steadily in an arc south-west turning north-west then north, with some rapids and well-known set of cataracts, Mambilima Falls near the main road. A far less well-known site is Tangwa, about 40 kilometres (25 mi) south where the river has eroded a gap through rocky hills carving huge caves, arches, and potholes, and leaving giant boulders, including two balancing rocks called 'God's Corn Bin'.

== Valley ==
From the Chembe Bridge to Lake Mweru, the 300 kilometres (190 mi) long Luapula Valley has a higher rural population than the plateau through which it cuts to a depth of up to 500 metres (1,600 ft). The river is known for this valley and for its long thin delta entering Lake Mweru, usually referred to as the Luapula Swamps. The well-populated part of the valley starts north from Mambilima Falls, and along the rest of its length is nicknamed 'Mwapoleni Road', after the Chibemba greeting called out as people pass each other.

For many practical study purposes, the lower Luapula and Mweru can be considered as one entity. They lie in a rift valley or graben once considered separate from the East African Rift but now seen as a branch of it. Mweru, however, drains not into Lake Tanganyika in the Albertine Rift but via the Luvua River, which has cut a deep, narrow zigzag valley to join the Lualaba River, as the upper Congo is named. The Luapula is part of the longest tributary of the Congo, and hence, by convention, is part of its source, even though the upper Lualaba carries more water.

Overlying the edge of the rift valley 60 kilometres (37 mi) west of the Luapula Swamps is the Luizi structure, a 12.6 kilometres (7.8 mi) wide series of concentric rings. It has been recently confirmed as a meteoritic impact crater (an astrobleme) formed less than 600 million years ago.

== Swamps ==
The swamps stretch along the last 100 kilometres (62 mi) of the river before it reaches the lake, and for much of that, they are 30 kilometres (19 mi) wide, covering an area of about 2,500 square kilometres (970 sq mi). There are four inhabited islands in the DR Congo part of the delta, including the largest in the system, which is accessible overland during the dry season. Zambia has three inhabited islands in the delta including Chisenga Island. There are also many lagoons, the largest of which is Mofwe Lagoon on the Zambian side.

As in the Bangweulu Swamps, floating beds of papyrus are a feature of the swamps, which often block channels and change the shape of lagoons. However, the main river channel does not get blocked and stays consistently about 400 metres (1,300 ft) wide. It has not developed the branching channels typical of river deltas.

Very tall reeds grow at the edge of the swamps in most places, making it difficult to see over the lagoons from land or to find the way to the maze of narrow channels used by dugout canoes. Guides are needed to navigate through them, and they are a haven for smuggling between the two countries sharing the swamps.

Crocodile and hippopotamus are common and a hazard for fishermen and travellers. However, the Shila people used to hunt hippopotamus using nothing more than harpoons thrown from canoes.

On the western side of the delta in DR Congo is a broad grassy floodplain covering about 1,600 km^{2}. At the end of the rainy season, the combined Luapula wetlands exceed 4,000 square kilometres (1,500 sq mi). The floodplain was home to herds of lechwe and the shy sitatunga, the famous semi-aquatic antelopes of the region, but both are believed extinct in the lower Luapula due to hunting and the lack of wildlife management.

== Human settlement ==
The upper and middle reaches of the Luapula are quite sparsely populated.

The natural resources of the lower valley, which include fisheries in the river, lagoons and wetlands with fertile farmland at the margins, attracted the Lunda invaders of Mwata Kazembe to settle there around 1750. Their present capital is at Mwansabombwe on the edge of the delta. Arab traders and slavers from Zanzibar and Portuguese traders from Mozambique were attracted to the area in the 18th and 19th Centuries. David Livingstone was the first Briton to visit in 1867. He did not explore the river but in his hunt for the origin of the Nile, Mwata Kazembe was the first to tell him that the Luapula connects the Chambeshi/Bangweulu and Mweru/Luvua/Lualaba systems. Livingstone wrongly believed the Lualaba then flowed to the Nile rather than to the River Congo.

Some of the first missionaries in Central Africa were also attracted to the valley. The first was the Garanganze Mission of the Plymouth Brethren at Mambilima around 1892, followed by the London Missionary Society at Mbereshi in 1900.

The first large town of the colonial era was the river port, Kasenga, in DR Congo, which grew prosperous in the 1930s from supplying fish to Elizabethville and other towns of the Katanga Copperbelt via the first motor road to reach the valley. Most of the fish was caught in Lake Mweru and brought by boat up the Luapula to Kasenga, where it was packed in ice produced in several plants. Although the fish catch has declined and most now travels on the better roads of Zambia, Kasenga remains the only port on the river. For more on the fisheries of the area, see Lake Mweru.

On the Zambian side of the Luapula, an outbreak of sleeping sickness made the British colonial authorities move their Fort Rosebery boma out of the valley onto the plateau at Mansa, while fears of malaria in the Luapula Swamps made them establish the next on the plateau at Kawambwa. Consequently, the towns and villages in the valley, such as the largest, Mwansabombwe, do not have the same ex-colonial character as the administrative towns. However, following the lead of missionary builders and Mwata Kazembe, from the early 1900s, most housing in the valley was of solid brick construction, sun-dried brick mainly, but with some burnt brick.

== Water transport ==
Before the advent of road transport, people travelled by canoe along the river between lakes Bangweulu and Mweru.

The lower river between Kasenga and Kilwa on Mweru is now the only stretch of the river carrying much boat transport and most of that is now for DR Congo, where roads are frequently impassable. Up to the late 1940s, the upper Luapula from Kapalala to Lake Bangweulu and the Chambeshi River was one of the most important stretches for river transport in the then Northern Rhodesia. Goods travelled by road from the railhead at Sakania 10 kilometres (6.2 mi) north of Ndola to Kapalala to be loaded onto dugout canoes and small boats. During World War I, a fleet of 1,885 such craft was used to convey matériel to Chambeshi from where it went on a military road to Mbala for the East African Campaign. Unfortunately, the floating papyrus and other vegetation frequently choked the channels through the Bangweulu swamps joining the lake, the Luapula and the Chambeshi, making it difficult to use larger motorboats.

== River crossings ==
The first vehicle pontoon ferries were at Kasenga, Kapalala and Shiniama near Matanda. None remain, though a passenger ferry operates between Kasenga and Kashiba, Zambia. Around 1950 the Chembe Ferry on the Congo Pedicle road became the main vehicle crossing. The river there is 400 metres (1,300 ft) wide but can flood to 1 kilometre (0.62 mi) wide in a heavy rainy season. In 1983 the first bridge over the river was built, the 2.5-kilometre (1.6 mi) long Luapula Bridge on the Samfya-Serenje Road. The bridge approaches include nearly 20 kilometres (12 mi) of elevated causeway over wetlands and another 40 kilometres (25 mi) of embankment over flood plain. The second bridge over the river, the 320-metre (1,050 ft) long Chembe Bridge was completed in 2008 to replace the Chembe Ferry.

== See also ==
- Congo Pedicle with map showing the river's course
- Luvua River
- Congo River
- Katanga Province
