= Luapula Province =

Province of Zambia

Coordinates: 11°00′S 29°00′E

Luapula
- Province
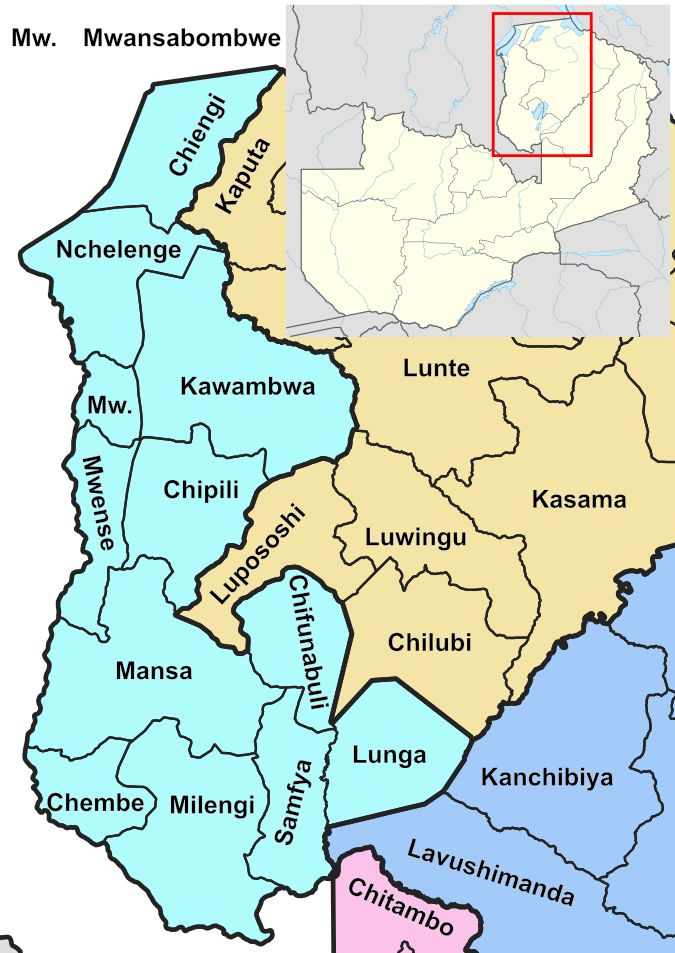
- Luapula Province showing its districts
- Country: Zambia
- Capital: Mansa

Government
  - Type: Provincial Administration
  - Provincial Minister: Nason Musonda

Area
  - Total: 50,567 km^{2} (19,524 sq mi)

Population (2022 census)
  - Total: 1,519,478
  - Density: 30.049/km^{2} (77.826/sq mi)
- Time zone: UTC+2
- HDI (2018): 0.520 low · 8th

Luapula Province is one of Zambia's ten provinces located in the northern part of the country. Luapula Province is named after the Luapula River and its capital is Mansa. As per the 2022 Zambian census, the Province had a population of 1,519,478, which accounted for 7.72 per cent of the total Zambian population.

The province has an international border along Democratic Republic of the Congo (DR Congo) and domestically extends along the northern and eastern banks of the Luapula river from Lake Bangweulu to Lake Mweru. The province is inhabited by Lunda, who are also the major tribe in the country. Bemba is one of the widely spoken languages in the province. The major economic activities are agriculture and fishing, with cassava being the major crop. Mutomboko ceremony is the most important festival celebrated. Lumangwe Falls, Mumbuluma Falls, Mumbotuta Waterfalls, Kundabwika Waterfalls and Chilongo Waterfalls are the major water falls.

The chief artery of the province is the Samfya-Mansa-Mwansabombwe-Nchelenge highway known informally as the Zambia Way. The province is bordered along the Luapula River, through Lake Mweru and to its north by DR Congo. Around 80.5 per cent of the population of Luapula is accounted as poor in 2010 census, making it the poorest of all provinces in Zambia. It has eight major attractions of the country among its waterfalls, wildlife and cultural heritage. Major mineral deposits found in the province are manganese, lime, copper and precious metals.

== History ==
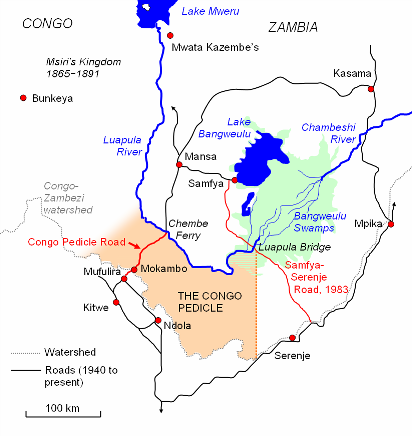
Map showing the Congo Pedicle relative to the borders formed by the Luapula River and Congo-Zambezi watershed.

In the 19th century, the valley was dominated by the Kingdom of Lunda of Mwata Kazembe. The boundaries of the province between Zambia and DR Congo were disputed for many years, running from an 1894 treaty into the late 1960s. The province has a long history of opposing colonial rule through militancy. From the 1950s, there were revolutionary groups that supported the Anti Federationist African National Congress. Post independence, the province was the base for the United National Independence Party (UNIP) militants. Laupula has constant migration of labour from DR Congo and also from nearby Copperbelt Province. During the 1980s, the then President Kenneth Kaunda appointed traditional Chiefs of the region as District Governors or members of the powerful UNIP central committee. The practice was seen similar to colonial rule when local leaders were drafted to political domain. Mwata Kazambe was appointed the District Governor for the province by the President during the 1980s.

Frederick Chiluba, the leader of Movement for Multi-Party Democracy (MMD), who went on to become the President of Zambia in 1991, obtained majority mandate during the 1991 elections. The province was the least affected among all areas in the country during the 1991 famine. Agriculture suffered in the region on account of removal of agricultural subsidies and rural credit schemes during the 1990s.

The province is bordered along the Luapula River, through Lake Mweru and to its north by DR Congo. The Congo Pedicle is located between the province and the industrial and commercial heartland of the Copperbelt. The issues in transportation was partly resolved with the construction of the Luapula Bridge and the Samfya-Serenje road, and being further alleviated by the construction of the Chembe Bridge. The capital of the province is Mansa, which is also the headquarters of Mansa district.

== Geography ==
The province borders along DR Congo and it extends along the northern and eastern banks of the river from Lake Bangweulu to Lake Mweru, including waters and islands of those lakes. Congo Pedicle, the southeast salient of the Katanga Province of the DR Congo, which sticks into neighbouring Zambia, divides it into two lobes. It is bordered by Northern Province on the eastern side and Central Province on the southeastern side. The major towns in the province include Samfya, Mansa, Nchelenge and Mwansabombwe. Around 40 per cent of Luapula is covered with water and there are a number of rivers and lakes. It has eight attractions in waterfalls, wildlife and cultural heritage. Major mineral deposits found in the province are manganese, lime, copper and precious metals.

Climate data for Luapula (Zambia)
Month	Jan	Feb	Mar	Apr	May	Jun	Jul	Aug	Sep	Oct	Nov	Dec	Year
Record high °C (°F)	27.1 (80.8)	27.3 (81.1)	27.4 (81.3)	27.3 (81.1)	26.7 (80.1)	25.2 (77.4)	25.2 (77.4)	27.3 (81.1)	30.4 (86.7)	31.2 (88.2)	29.2 (84.6)	27.1 (80.8)	31.2 (88.2)
Mean daily maximum °C (°F)	20.8 (69.4)	20.9 (69.6)	20.9 (69.6)	20.6 (69.1)	18.8 (65.8)	16.5 (61.7)	16.6 (61.9)	18.6 (65.5)	21.8 (71.2)	23.2 (73.8)	22.2 (72.0)	20.8 (69.4)	23.2 (73.8)
Mean daily minimum °C (°F)	16.8 (62.2)	16.8 (62.2)	16.6 (61.9)	15.4 (59.7)	12.3 (54.1)	9.1 (48.4)	8.6 (47.5)	10.4 (50.7)	13.5 (56.3)	16.1 (61.0)	16.9 (62.4)	16.8 (62.2)	8.6 (47.5)
Average precipitation mm (inches)	256 (10.1)	219 (8.6)	176 (6.9)	46 (1.8)	3 (0.1)	0 (0)	0 (0)	0 (0)	1 (0.0)	19 (0.7)	129 (5.1)	246 (9.7)	1,095 (43.1)
Source 1:
Source 2:

== Demographics ==
Historical population
Year	Pop.	±%
1964	357,000	—
1969	336,000	−5.9%
1980	728,775	+116.9%
1990	750,542	+3.0%
2000	775,353	+3.3%
2010	991,927	+27.9%
2022	1,519,478	+53.2%
Sources: 1964–69: 1980–2000: 2010:

As per the 2010 Zambian census, Luapula Province had a population of 991,927 which accounted for 7.57 per cent of the total Zambian population of 13,092,666. There were 488,589 males and 503,338 females, making the sex ratio to 1,030 for every 1,000 males, compared to the national average of 1,028. The literacy rate stood at 62.60 per cent against a national average of 70.2 per cent. The rural population constituted 80.39 per cent, while the urban population was 19.61 per cent. The total area of the province was 50,567 km^{2} (19,524 sq mi) and the population density was 19.60 per km^{2}. The population density during 2000 Zambian census stood at 19.60.

The decadal population growth of the province was 2.50 per cent. The median age in the province at the time of marriage was 20.3. The average household size was 4.9, with the families headed by females being 4.0 and 5.4 for families headed by men. The total eligible voters in the province was 65.40 per cent. The unemployment rate of the province was 7.70 per cent. The total fertility rate (TFR) was 7.3, complete birth rate was 6.5, crude birth rate was 39.0, child women population at birth was 835, general fertility rate was 172, gross reproduction rate was 2.7 and net reproduction rate was 1.8. The total labour force constituted 58.60 per cent of the total population. Out of the labour force, 66.2 per cent were men and 51.7 per cent women. The annual growth rate of labour force was 1.9 per cent.

Bemba was the most spoken language with 71.30 per cent speaking it. Albinism is a condition where the victims do not have any pigment in their skin, hair or eyes. The total population in the province with the condition stood at 2,278. The life expectancy at birth stood at 45 compared to the national average of 51. Luapula is one of the poorest provinces in Zambia with 80.5 per cent of the population accounted as poor and 64.9 as extremely poor as of 2010, compared to 73.9 and 53.5 per cent in 2006. Among all provinces, Luapula recorded the highest TFR of 7.3, and also the highest infant mortality rate (IMR) of 100 deaths per 1,000 births as of 2010.

== Economy and utility services ==
HIV infected & AIDS deaths
Year	HIV infected	AIDS deaths
1990	6,971	198
1995	32,447	1,478
2000	46,293	3,682
2005	49,798	5,131
2010	51,211	5,209

As per the report of agricultural statistics of 2014 published by the Central Statistical Office of Zambia, the major economic activity in the province was fishing. The chief artery of the province is the Samfya-Mansa-Mwansabombwe-Nchelenge highway, known as the Zambia Way. Though rich in natural resources, the province is one of the backward districts in the country. As of 2004, 79 per cent of the population was poor against a national average of 68. The total area of crops planted during the year 2014 in the province was 57,966.31 ha (143,237.9 acres) which constituted 3.06 per cent of the total area cultivated in Zambia. The net production stood at 150,029 metric tonnes, which formed 3.68 per cent of the total agricultural production in the country. Sweet potato was the major crop in the province with 11,356 metric tonnes, constituting 7.56 per cent of the national output.

As of 2004, the province had 527 basic schools, 20 high schools. The number of school children out of school in ages between 7 and 15 stood at 527. As per the International Monetary Fund (IMF) paper on Poverty Reduction in Zambia published in 2007, there were 360 basic government schools, 18 high schools, one teacher training college and one trade training college as of 2000. The employment levels in the province remained low, decreasing from 14.3 per cent in 1990 to 8.1 in 2000. The unemployment rate was six per cent and the general unemployment rate for youth stood at 14 per cent as of 2008. The province had 30 doctors as of 2005. There were 407 Malaria incidences for every 1,000 people in the province as of 2005, and there were 5,209 AIDS-related death as of 2010. The province has around 700 km (430 mi) of paved roads as of 2007. They connect the different districts to the capital, along with 2,000 km (1,200 mi) of unpaved roads.

== Administration ==
Profession	% of working population
Agriculture, Forestry & Fishing (by Industry)	10.50
Community, Social and Personal	3.10
Construction	3.10
Electricity, Gas, and water	0.00
Financial & Insurance activities	2.40
Hotels and Restaurants	1.40
Manufacturing	4.30
Mining & Quarrying	0.90
Transportation and Storage	3.20
Wholesale & Retail Trade	4.80

Provincial administration is set up purely for administrative purposes. The province is headed by a minister appointed by the President and there are ministries of central government for each province. The administrative head of the province is the Permanent Secretary, appointed by the President. There is a Deputy Permanent Secretary, heads of government departments and civil servants at the provincial level. Luapula Province is divided into twelve districts, namely Chembe District, Chiengi District, Chifunabuli District, Chipili District, Kawambwa District, Lunga District, Mansa District, Milenge District, Mwansabombwe District, Mwense District, Nchelenge District and Samfya District. All the district headquarters are the same as the district names. There are twelve councils in the province, each of which is headed by an elected representative, called councilor. Each councilor holds office for three years.

The administrative staff of the council is selected based on the Local Government Service Commission from within or outside the district. The office of the provincial government is located in each of the district headquarters and has provincial local government officers and auditors. Each council is responsible for raising and collecting local taxes and the budgets of the council are audited and submitted every year after the annual budget. The elected members of the council do not draw salaries, but are paid allowances from the council. Luapula is a predominantly rural province and there are no city or municipal councils. The government stipulates 63 different functions for the councils with the majority of them being infrastructure management and local administration. Councils are mandated to maintain each of their community centres, zoos, local parks, drainage system, playgrounds, cemeteries, caravan sites, libraries, museums and art galleries. They also work along with specific government departments to help in agriculture, conservation of natural resources, postal service, establishing and maintaining hospitals, schools and colleges. The councils prepare schemes that encourage community participation.

== Culture and tourism ==
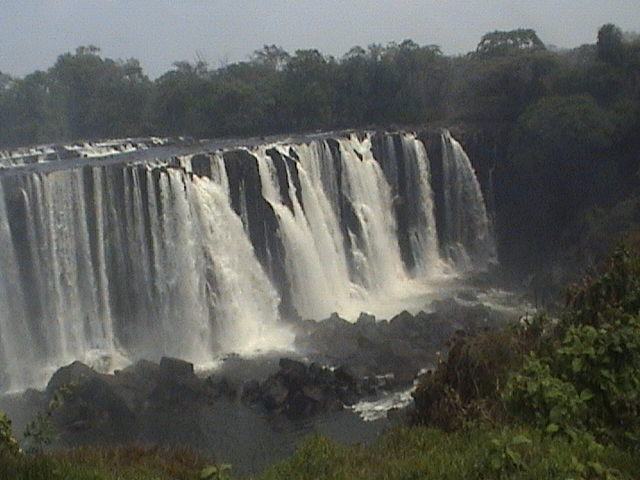
Lumangwe falls

Lumangwe Falls located in Mporokoso District, Ntumbacushi Falls in Kawambwa district, Kabwelume Waterfalls on the Kalungwishi River, Mumbuluma Falls in Mansa, Mumbotuta Waterfalls in the confluence of Mumbotuta streams and Luapula River, Kundabwika Waterfalls, Chilongo Waterfalls located 85 km (53 mi) from Kawambwa boma are the major water falls in the province. Other major picnic areas in the Province are the Samfya Beach in Lake Bangweulu, the shores of Lake Mweru in Chienge District, and the Nchelemge Beach in Lake Mweru. Lusenga Plain National Park and Bangweulu Wetlands are the major wildlife areas in the province. Lake Mweru, Luapula River, Lake Bangweulu and its wetlands have exotic bird life, aquatic animals and fish.

Mutukumbo festival is the major festival celebrated in the province in Luapala Valley. It is held annually during July and attracts around 20,000 people, including the President of Zambia. The event involves enacting the migration of Luba Lunda and conquest of the valley by the chiefs of the tribe during historic times. Kwanga festival is held in the October by the Njumba tribe in Samfya. It is seen as a cultural reunion of the tribe to preserve their rituals and traditions. Other festivals celebrated in the province are the Malaila Ceremony, the festival of death of evil lion, the Musubilwa Mpemba Ceremony, and the Ubwilile traditional ceremony.

== See also ==
- Bibliography of the history of Zambia

== Notes ==
https://www.times.co.zm/?p=126297 Chilundika Fired from the Provincial Minister position
