= Tourism in Zambia =

Tourism in Zambia relates to tourism in the African nation Zambia. The tourism industry is a major and growing industry in Zambia. Zambia has more than 2500 lions along with several National parks, waterfalls, lakes, rivers, and historic monuments. Zambia has been involved in several agreements on tourism with nations like Uganda and Kenya. Uganda Ministry of Tourism and Arts said Zambia is a model in tourism in Africa. Zambia Tourism Agency (ZTA) has partnered with the Government through the Ministry of Tourism and private sector to enhance the marketing aspect in the tourism industry.

== Overview ==
Zambia's tourism industry is one of the country's growth potential areas. It has been given the non-traditional export status and is receiving a lot of support from the Government by way of infrastructure development, promotion of increased private sector participation, as well as attractive tax incentives for all investments in the sector.

Hunting is also an important part of the Zambian tourist industry. Though the country banned all hunting in January 2013 amid concerns of corruption and over hunting of certain species, it legalized hunting again for most species of plains game in 2014. Additionally, the Zambian Tourism Minister announced that leopards may be legally hunted starting in 2015 and lions may be hunted again beginning in 2016.

== Tourist Attractions ==
Major and Popular Tourist Attractions including their Locations
Name of Attraction	Location	Closest Airport	Note(s)
Victoria Falls	Livingstone, Southern Province	Harry Mwanga Nkumbula International Airport	One of the Seven Natural Wonders of the World. Locally known as Mosi-oa-Tunya
Lake Kariba	Southern Province	Harry Mwanga Nkumbula International Airport	World's second largest man-made Reservoir at 5,580 square kilometres
Livingstone Crocodile Park	Livingstone, Southern Province	Harry Mwanga Nkumbula International Airport	
Livingstone Museum	Livingstone, Southern Province	Harry Mwanga Nkumbula International Airport	Country's oldest museum and holds letters & journals of David Livingstone
Siavonga	Siavonga, Southern Province	Harry Mwanga Nkumbula International Airport	
Mosi-oa-Tunya National Park	Southern Province	Harry Mwanga Nkumbula International Airport	
Kalambo Falls	Luapula Province	Mansa Airport	
Lake Bangweulu	Luapula Province	Mansa Airport	
Lusenga Plain National Park	Luapula Province	Mansa Airport	New office, gate and access road
Lumangwe Falls	Luapula and Northern Provinces	Mansa Airport	Largest waterfall wholly within the country, with a height of 30–40 m and a width of 100–160 m
Mumbuluma Falls	Luapula Province	Mansa Airport	
Musonda Falls	Luapula Province	Mansa Airport	
Mweru Wantipa National Park	Luapula and Northern Provinces	Mansa Airport	
Ntumbachushi Falls	Luapula Province	Mansa Airport	Cascading Waterfall and pools stretching 2 km above 2 parallel, 10m wide, 30m deep main falls
Samfya Beach	Samfya, Luapula Province	Mansa Airport	Dozens of kilometers of White Sand Beach
Chilambwe Falls	Northern Province	Kasama Airport	
Chishimba Falls	Kasama, Northern Province	Kasama Airport	
Isangano National Park	Northern Province	Kasama Airport	Found in the Bangweulu Wetlands
Kabwelume Falls	Northern Province	Kasama Airport	
Lavushi Manda National Park	Northern Province	Kasama Airport	Found in the Bangweulu Wetlands
Moto Moto Museum	Mbala, Northern Province	Kasama Airport	
Nsumbu National Park	Northern Province	Kasaba Bay Airport	Airport is closed, under redevelopment, alternative for charter flights is Chisala Airstrip (June 2026).
Kasaba Bay resort, Nsumbu NP	Northern Province	Kasaba Bay Airport	Resort and airport are under redevelopment (June 2026).
Kafue National Park	North-Western Province	Kenneth Kaunda International Airport	Largest national park in Zambia, covering an area of about 22,400 km^{2}
West Lunga National Park	North-Western Province	Solwezi Airport	
Zambezi Source	Mwinilunga, North-Western Province	Solwezi Airport	Source of the Zambezi river and a botanical reserve, part of Zambezi Source National Forest.
Blue Lagoon National Park	Central Province	Kenneth Kaunda International Airport	
Lunsemfwa Wonder Gorge and Bell Point	Mkushi, Central Province	Simon Mwansa Kapwepwe International Airport	
Kasanka National Park	Central Province	Mansa Airport	
Kapishya Hotsprings	Mpika, Muchinga Province	Kasama Airport	
Kundalila Falls	Muchinga Province	Mansa Airport	
North Luangwa National Park	Muchinga Province	Mfuwe Airport	
Nyika National Park	Muchinga Province	Mfuwe Airport	
South Luangwa National Park	Muchinga Province	Mfuwe Airport	
Mfuwe Lodge	Muchinga Province	Mfuwe Airport	A safari lodge overlooking Mfuwe Lagoon in South Luangwa National Park
Chembe Bird Sanctuary	Kitwe, Copperbelt Province	Simon Mwansa Kapwepwe International Airport	
Nsobe Game Park	Copperbelt Province	Simon Mwansa Kapwepwe International Airport	
Happy Land Amusement Park	Chongwe, Lusaka Province	Kenneth Kaunda International Airport	Amusement Park
Lochinvar National Park	Lusaka Province	Kenneth Kaunda International Airport	
Lolebezi Safari Lodge	Lusaka Province	Kenneth Kaunda International Airport	
Lower Zambezi National Park	Lusaka Province	Kenneth Kaunda International Airport	
Lusaka National Museum	Lusaka, Lusaka Province	Kenneth Kaunda International Airport	Museum
Lusaka National Park	Lusaka, Lusaka Province	Kenneth Kaunda International Airport	
Munda Wanga Environmental Park	Chilanga, Lusaka Province	Kenneth Kaunda International Airport	
TAZARA Memorial Park	Chongwe, Lusaka Province	Kenneth Kaunda International Airport	Museum
Barotse Floodplain	Western Province	Mongu Airport	
Chavuma Falls	Western Province	Lukulu Airport	
Liuwa Plain National Park	Western Province	Lukulu Airport	
Ngonye Falls	Western Province	Lukulu Airport	Also known as Sioma Falls
Sioma Ngwezi National Parks	Western Province	Sesheke Airport	

== Governmental Policies Regarding Tourism ==
Due to Zambia's poor economic status, the country has historically relied on foreign aid in an attempt to alleviate poverty. Tourism has emerged in recent years as an alternate method to mining to boost Zambia's economy.

Tourism is being seen by Zambia's government as a tool for economic and rural development, as it generates income, creates jobs, promotes wildlife conservation, and improves standards of living.

The increasingly popular worldwide phenomena adventure tourism has also risen in popularity within Zambia, especially within the city of Livingstone, which is now becoming known as Africa's "adventure tourism capital".

Since tourism as an economic sector is boosted with cooperation between neighboring countries, Zambia, as a member of the South African Development Community (SADC), has cooperated with other countries within the SADC in order to mutually attract tourists.

Zambia, along with fellow SADC nations, have struggled to compete with other nations with more established tourist destinations, for a variety of reasons, some of which include difficulty in transportation to the countries, an absence of direct international flights, and failure to create attractive tourist experiences or products.

=== Efforts to Promote Tourism ===
As a member of the SADC, Zambia engaged in the following efforts to promote tourism.

SADC Tourism Protocol 1998 - Member countries are urged to create a "Univisa" that would allow tourists to travel across the borders of SADC countries freely. After initial success, in November 2014, Zambia and Zimbabwe signed a memorandum of understanding to put into effect a more permanent UNIVISA which allows tourists to visit both countries with a single visa.

Regional Tourism Organization of South Africa (RETOSA) 2002 - In an attempt to make the SADC more appealing to visitors, the charter imposed upon member states of SADC a series of protocols and programs to promote the region.

Zambia is currently struggling to facilitate tourism without creating a burden on local communities that would result in a loss of culture, an unstable economy, and compromised environment.

== Tourism as a form of wildlife conservation ==
An increase in sport hunting and ecotourism has resulted in an increase in wildlife populations in South African countries such as Zambia. Since Zambia is home to so many national parks, waterfalls, and game management areas, most of Zambia's tourism is dependent on wildlife. Ecotourism within Zambia, while devastated by the COVID-19 pandemic, has played a major role in controlling poaching and bringing in foreign investment for wildlife protection.

One U.N. Development Programme, the Lion's Share, announced recently its commitment to grant $400,000 towards wildlife-based tourism in Zambia, in order to protect wildlife and generate jobs. Not only is wildlife essential to the development of Zambia's Tourism industry and thus Zambia's economy, but tourism is also essential to the preservation of wildlife in Zambia. The Minister of Tourism and Arts of Zambia stands by the framework defined in expectations and goals set out in the Agenda 2030, an initiative to increase tourism sustainability in Africa.

However, tourism has also been linked to an increase in urbanization within Zambia, at the detriment of the environmentalism efforts. Another challenge of tourism is documented instances of the Dengue Virus being spread throughout the region from other neighboring countries.

== Gallery ==
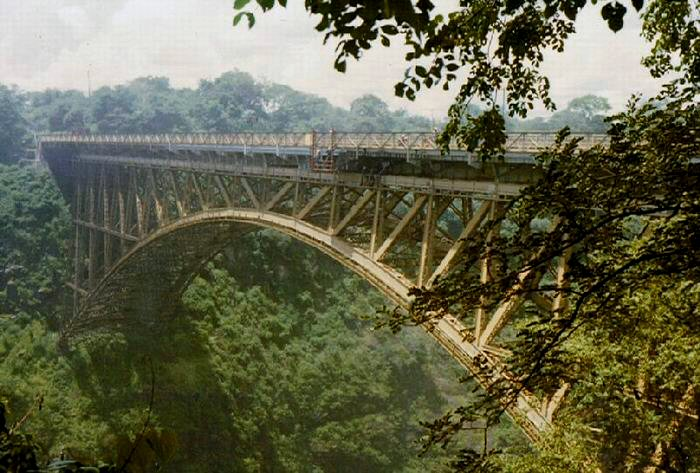
Victoria Falls Bridge

Lusaka National Museum

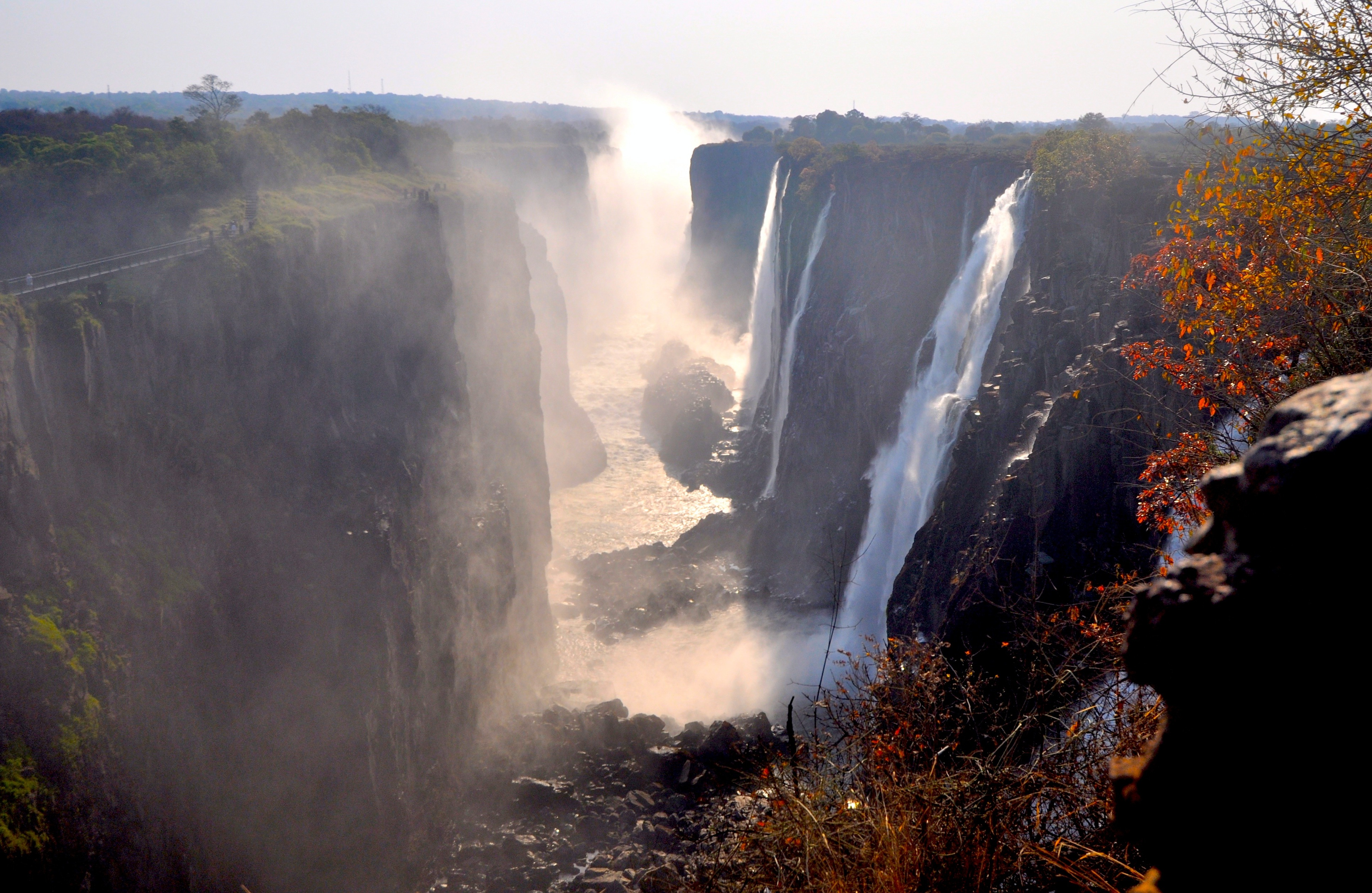
Victoria Falls

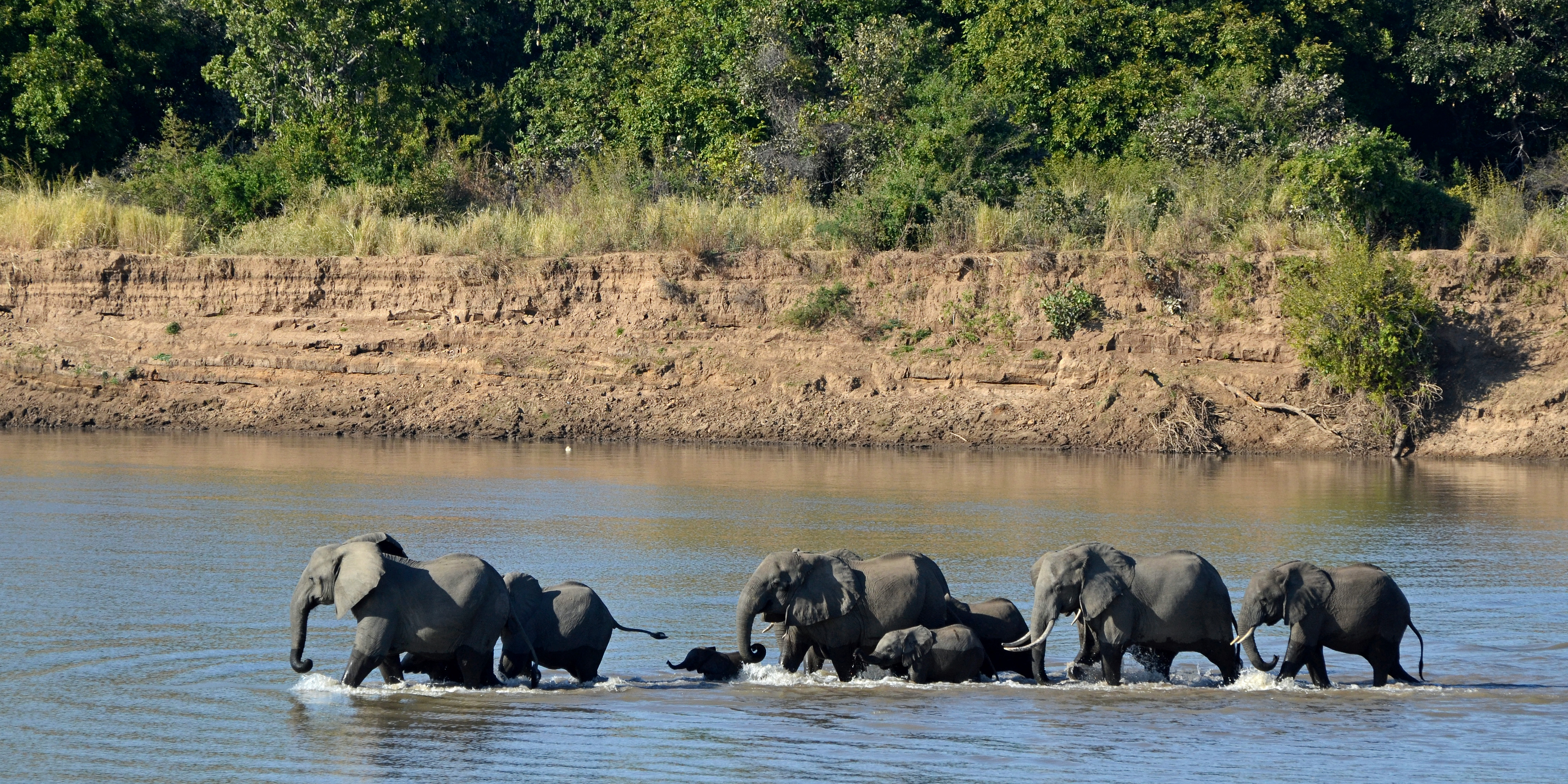
South Luangwa National Park

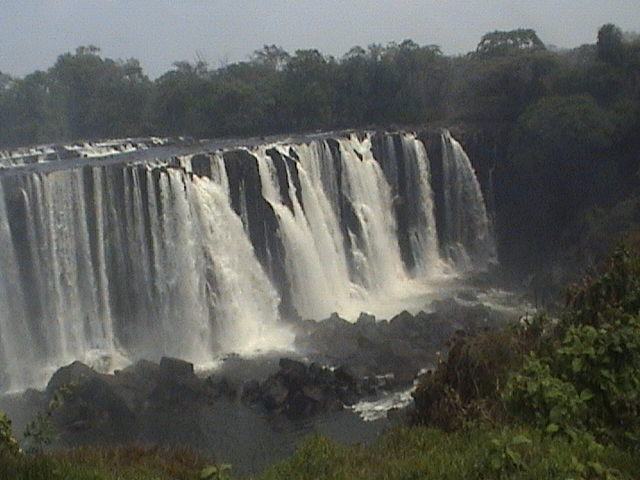
Lumangwe Falls

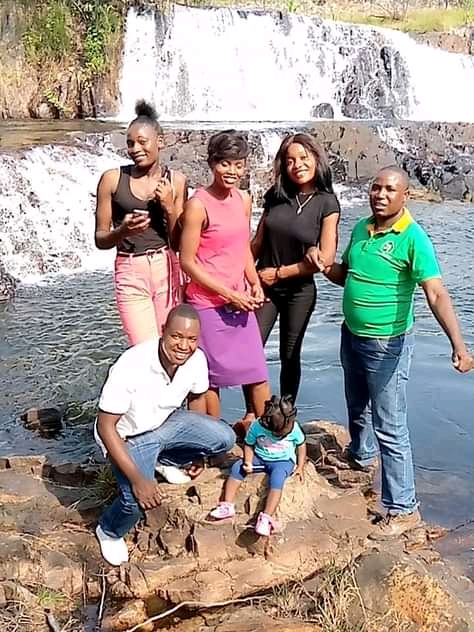
Ntumbachushi Falls

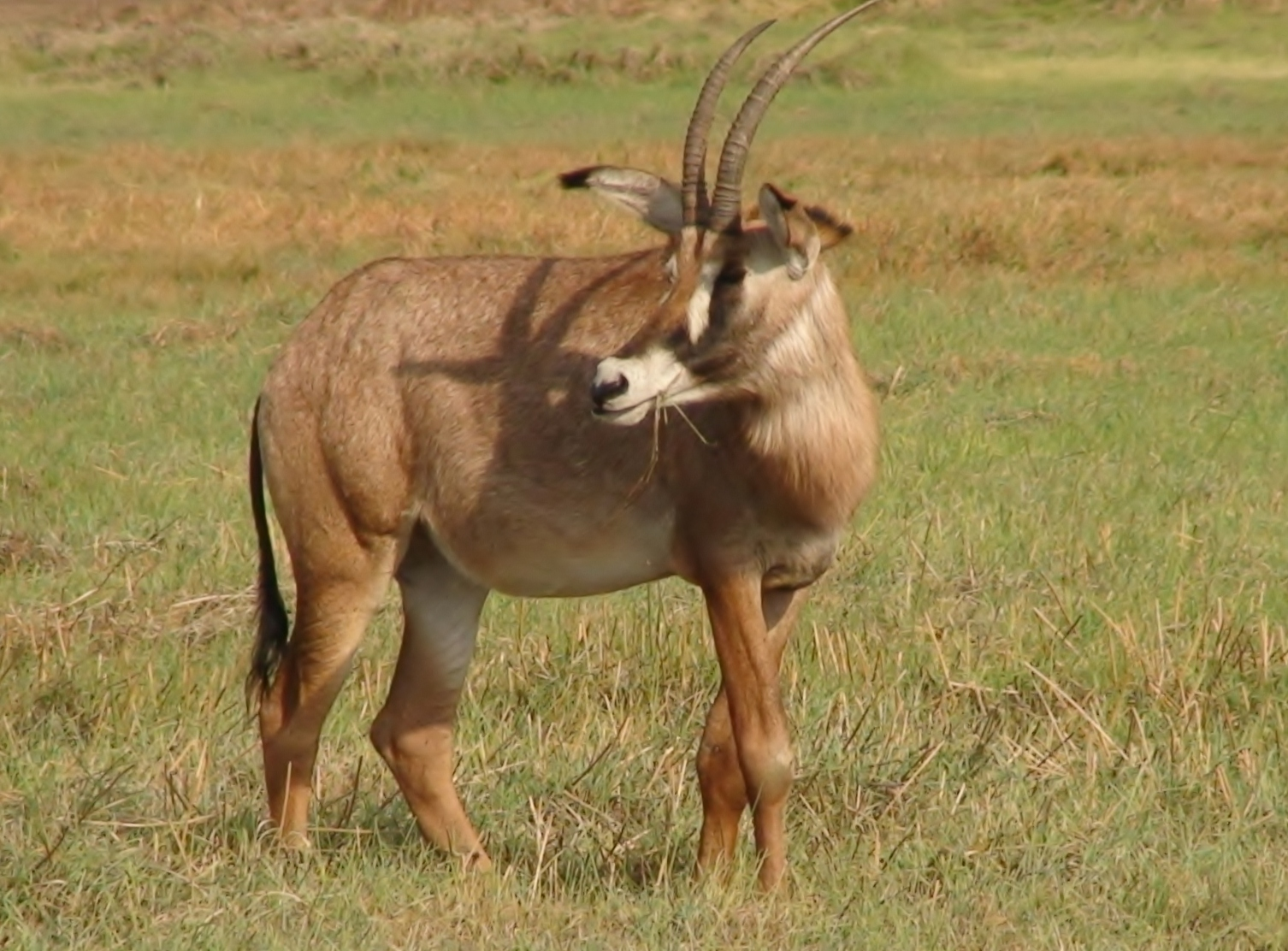
Kafue National Park

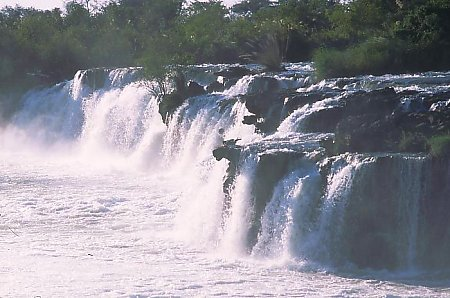
Ngonye Falls

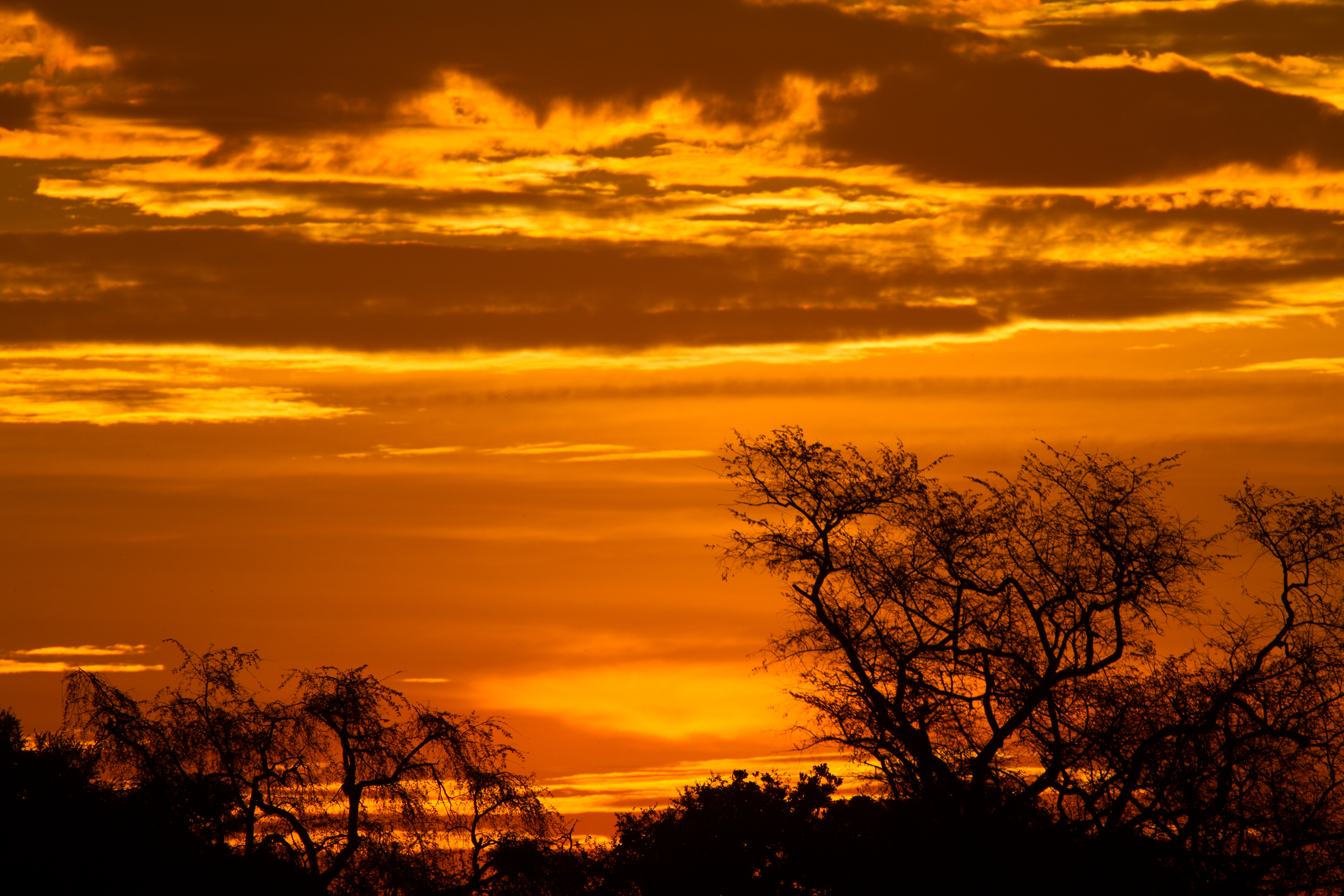
Mfuwe Sunset

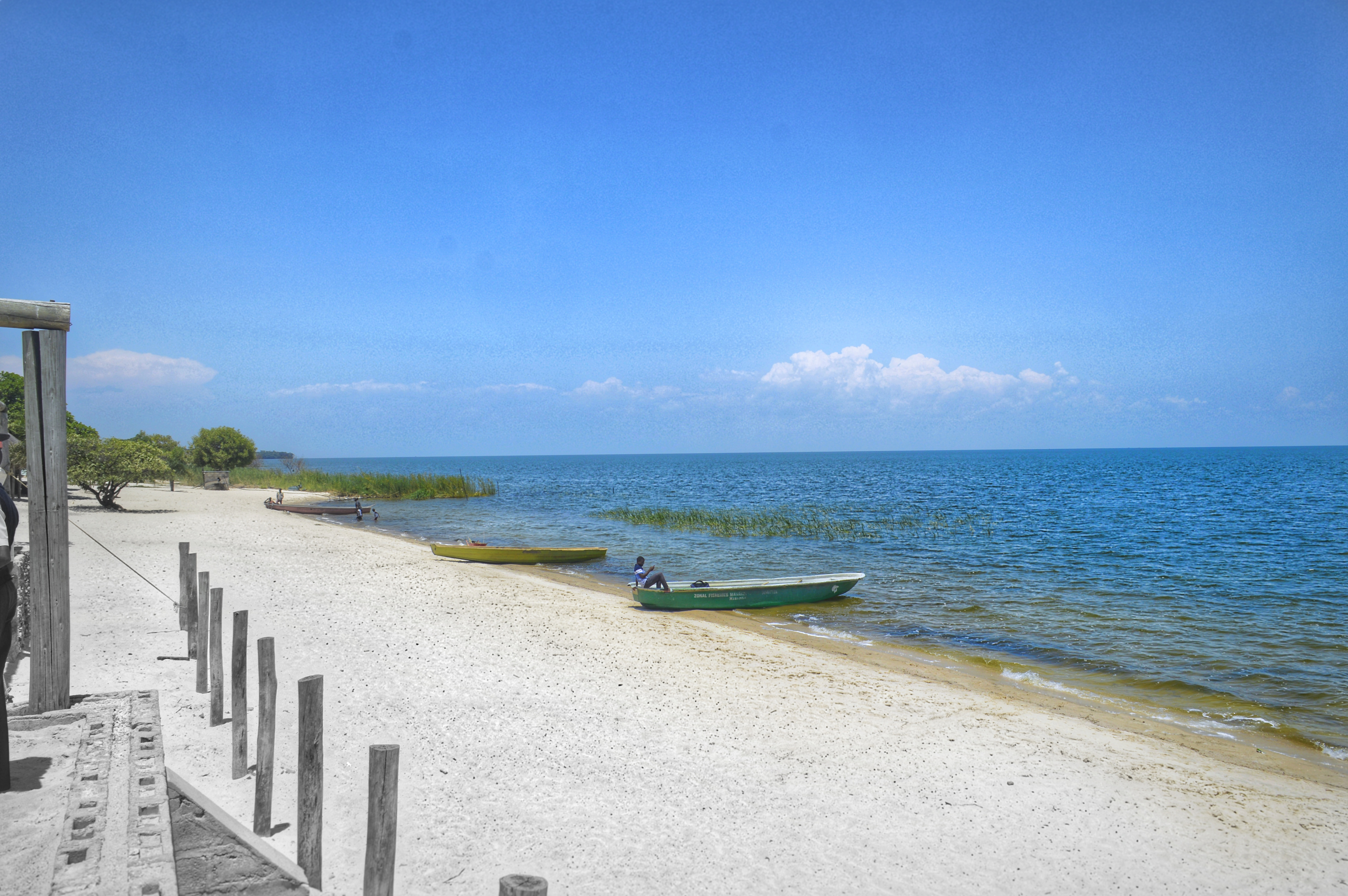
Samfya Beach

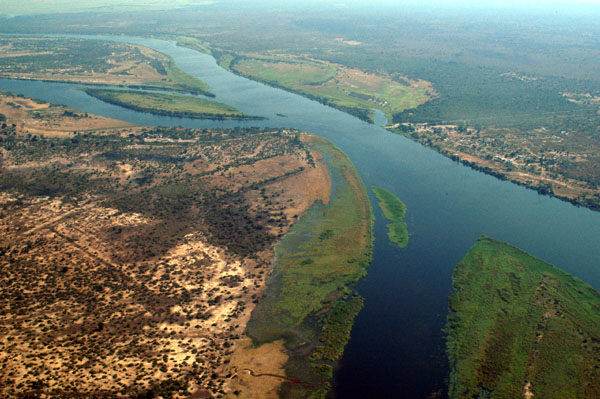
Zambezi River at junction of Zambia, Namibia, Zimbabwe & Botswana

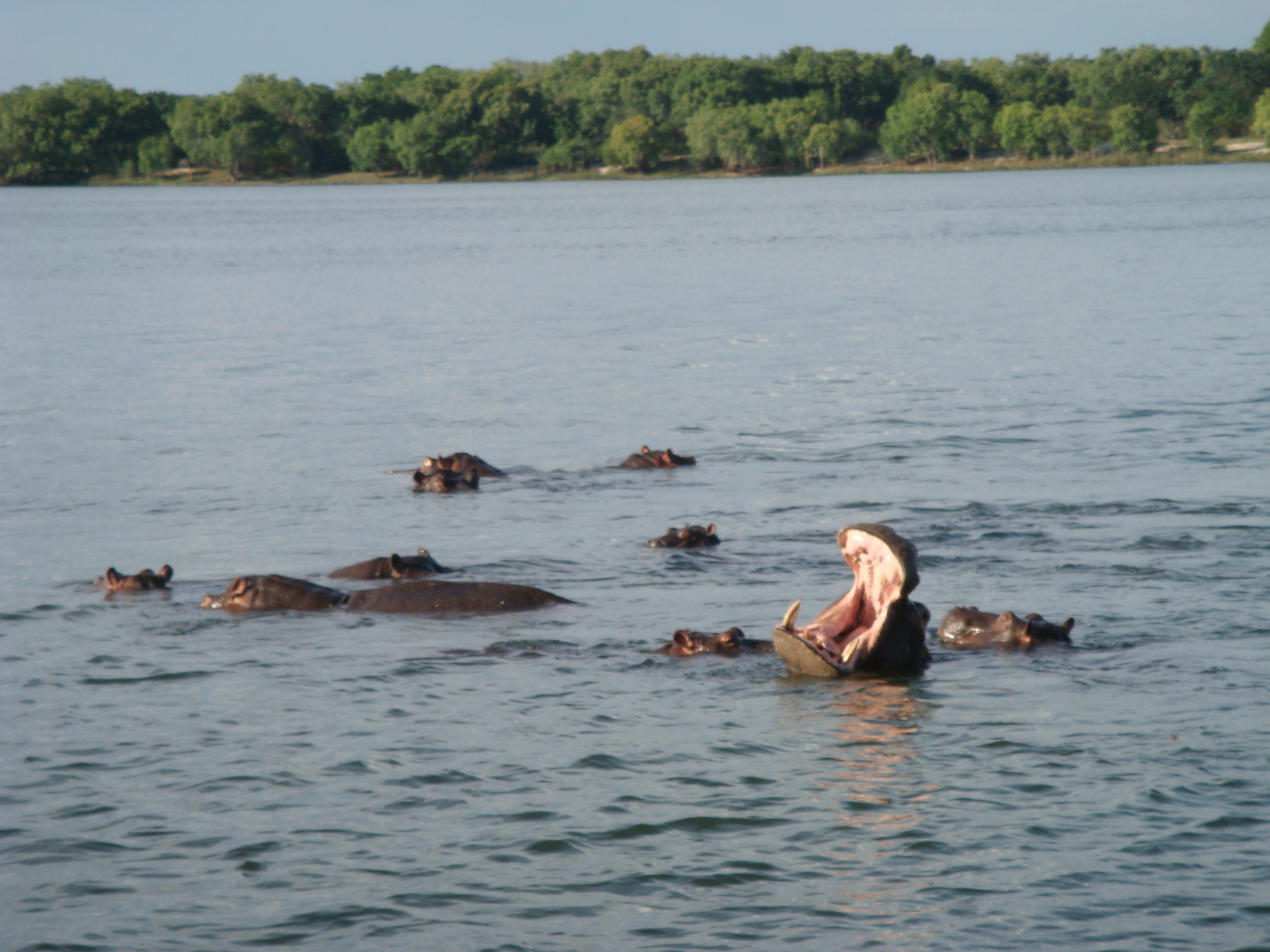
Hippopotamus in the Zambezi River

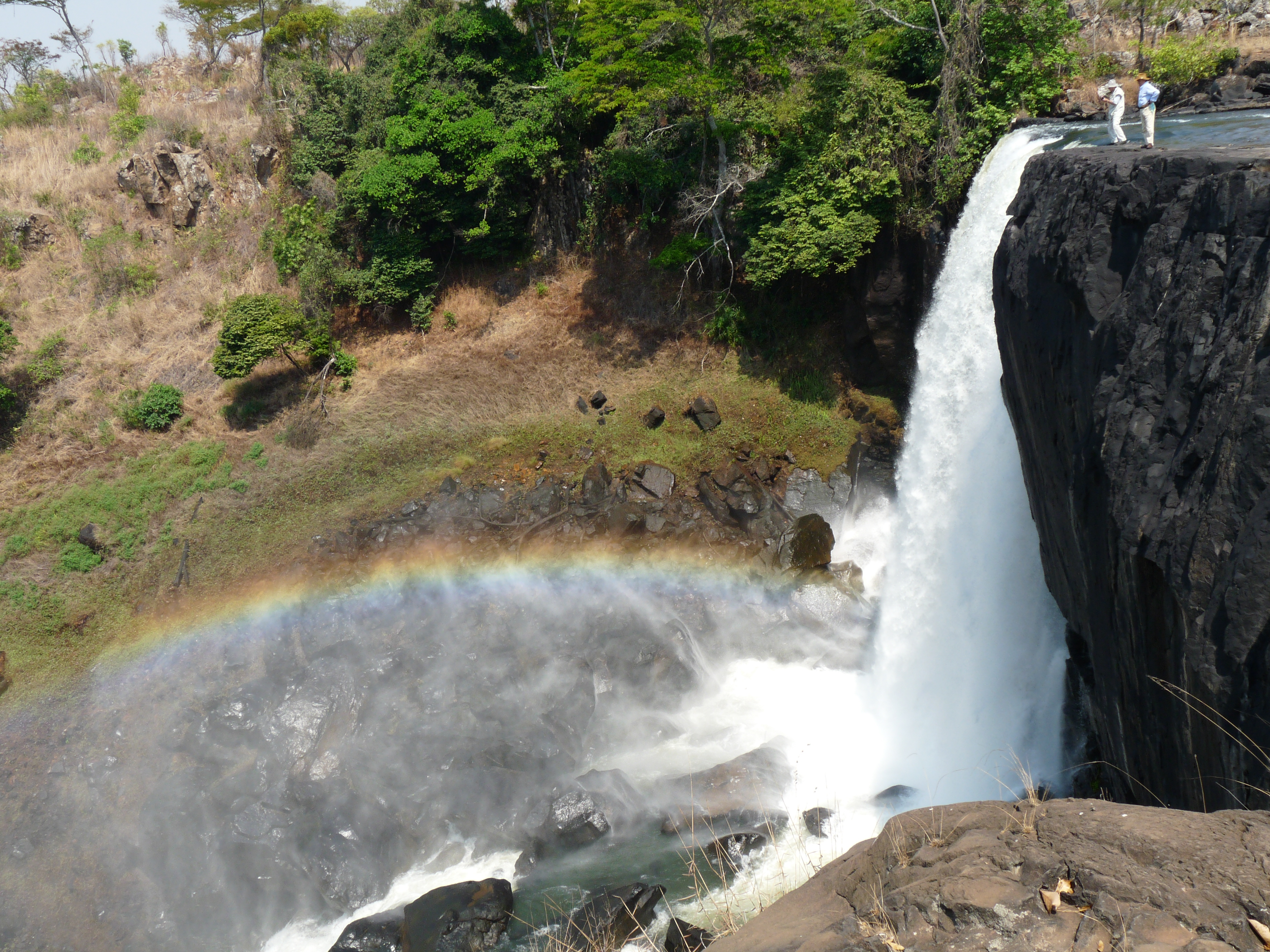
Chisimba Falls

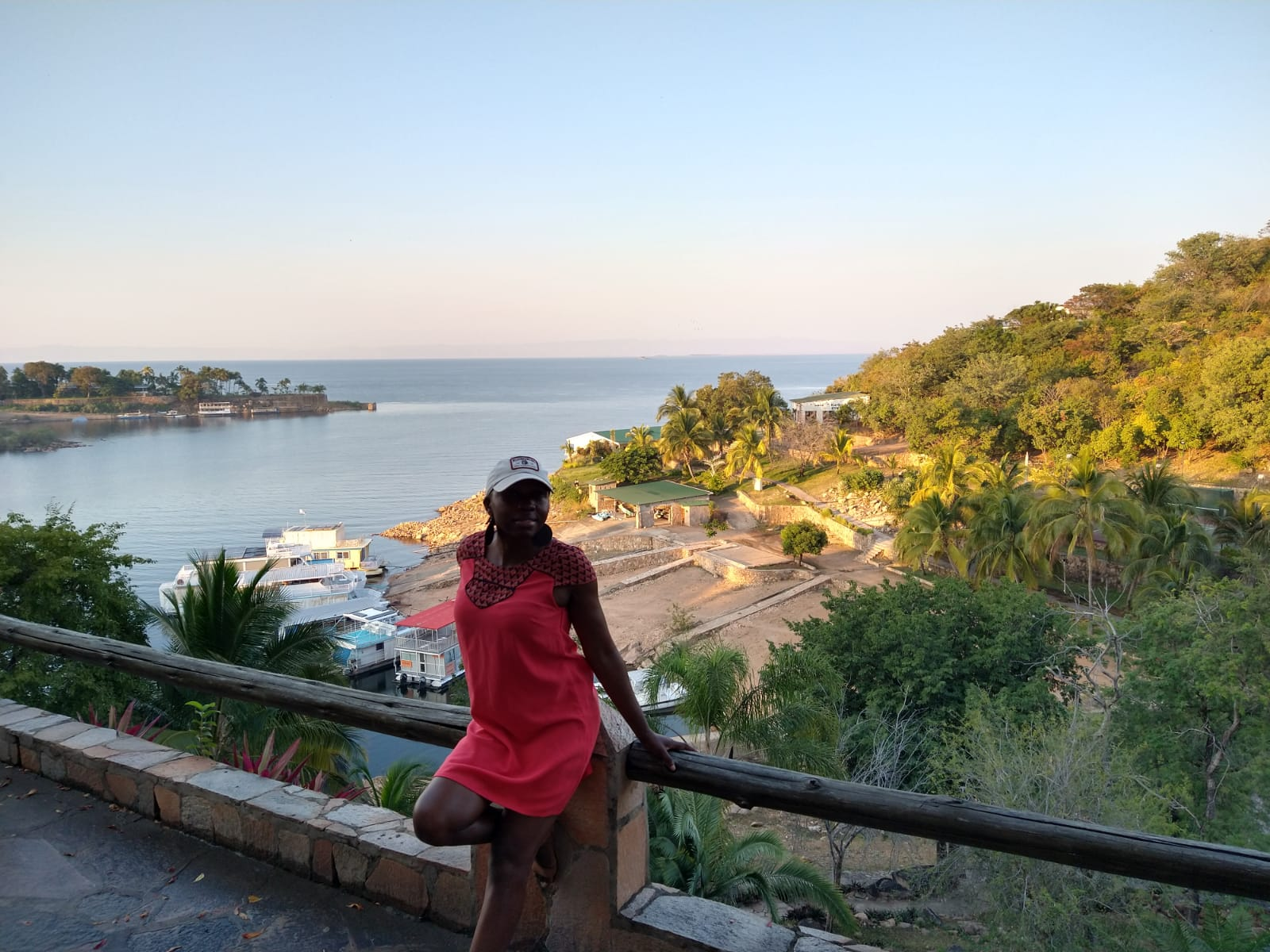
Lake Kariba in Siavonga

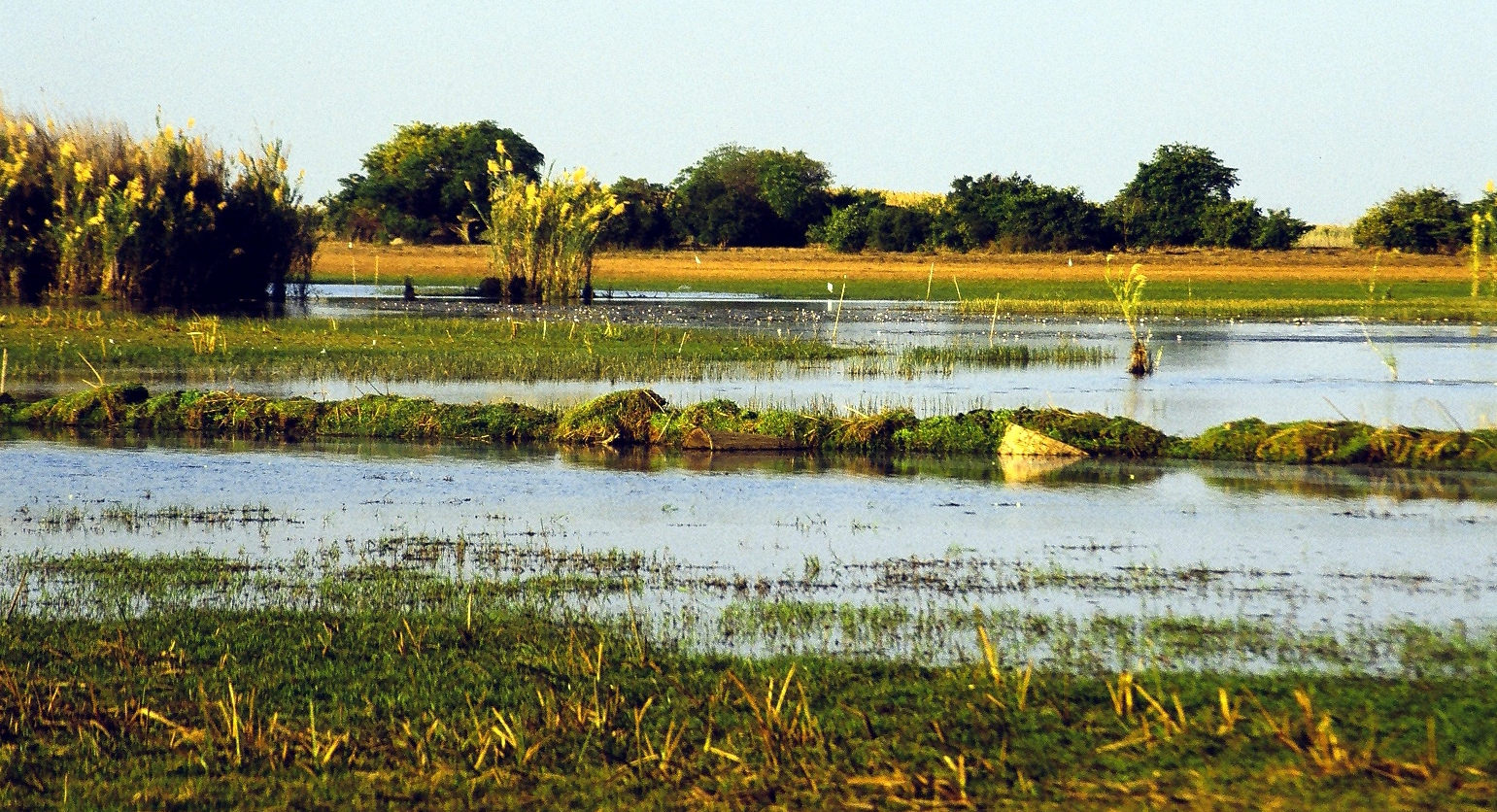
Bangweulu Wetlands

== Visa Regulations ==
As of 1 October 2022, visa requirements were waived for tourists holding a passport from the following countries and territories:

Country	Gulf States	Europe
Australia	Bahrain	European Union
Canada	Kuwait	United Kingdom
China	Iraq	Norway
Japan	Oman	
South Korea	Qatar	
United States	Saudi Arabia	
	United Arab Emirates	

== Arrivals by country ==
Most visitors arriving in Zambia were from the following countries of nationality:

Country	2021	2020	2019	2018	2017	2015	2014	2013
Tanzania	169,798	118,708	206,771	161,990	222,095	166,833	219,215	184,187
Zimbabwe	139,881	185,154	424,921	340,263	242,848	225,527	208,962	191,048
Democratic Republic of Congo	75,466	48,311	108,421	82,578	96,480	96,201	89,796	—N/a
South Africa	36,018	28,437	92,033	94,170	92,486	94,030	98,216	87,048
India	14,944	10,960	30,789	25,505	22,337	25,517	21,117	17,136
Mozambique	14,765	12,955	23,671	19,899	19,833			
Malawi	12,683	13,603	26,208	32,667	28,783	31,539	29,579	—N/a
United States	12,256	6,120	39,930	41,390	39,121	38,496	32,625	31,826
Kenya	7,848	5,530	13,924	11,754	10,626			
Botswana	7,315	8,991						
United Kingdom	7,226	8,510	27,019	34,789	43,487	36,997	31,280	32,309
China	6,918	7,696	34,400	27,796	26,562	20,648	30,831	27,603
Namibia	6,148	7,537				22,311	16,742	—N/a
Uganda	4,175							
Germany	2,271	1,502	7,856	9,565	7,952			
France	1,956	1,623	6,142	6,460	5,092			
Netherlands	1,434	1,174						
Canada	1,244	1,406	6,786	6,911	5,311			
Italy	933	851	4,232	5,733	3,138			
Australia	677	1,644	10,614	11,059	8,547			
Denmark	424	379	1,670	1,764	2,225			
Total	554,290	501,606	1,266,427	1,072,012	1,009,173	931,782	946,969	914,576

== See also ==
- Economy of Zambia: Tourism
