= Lusenga Plain National Park =

National park in Zambia

- IUCN category II (national park)
- Location within Zambia
- Location: Luapula Province, Zambia
- Nearest city: Kawambwa
- Coordinates: 9°28′S 29°09′E
- Area: 800 km^{2} (310 sq mi)
- Max. elevation: 1374 m
- Min. elevation: 980 m
- Established: 1972
- Governing body: Department of National Parks and Wildlife of Zambia
- Website: https://www.zambiatourism.com/destinations/national-parks/lusenga-plains-national-park/

Lusenga Plain National Park is a national park in Kawambwa District, Luapula Province of Zambia, situated to the south-east of Lake Mweru and on the western bank of the Kalungwishi River. (Note: 'Lusenga Plains National Park' (plural) is seen on some websites but geographically 'Lusenga Plain' singular is correct.)

Once rich in large game animals, the Park was neglected and wildlife numbers declined, but in recent years there have been improvements including the restocking of some animals and provision of Park staff and infrastructure, such as wildlife scouts and an improved access road.

Lusenga Plain National Park is particularly rich in birdlife.

== Geography, ecological zones, and wildlife ==
The Park is on the northwestern extremity of the Kawambwa–Mporokoso plateau, covered mainly in miombo woodland with a dendritic pattern of dambos and streams, at an average elevation of about 1200 m. Miombo woodland is the most extensive biome in Zambia and stretches into neighbouring countries, providing a huge area for elephants, buffalo and large antelope to roam.

The Park has annual rainfall of about 1500 mm producing tall grass growth by the end of every dry season, with flooding in lower-lying areas.

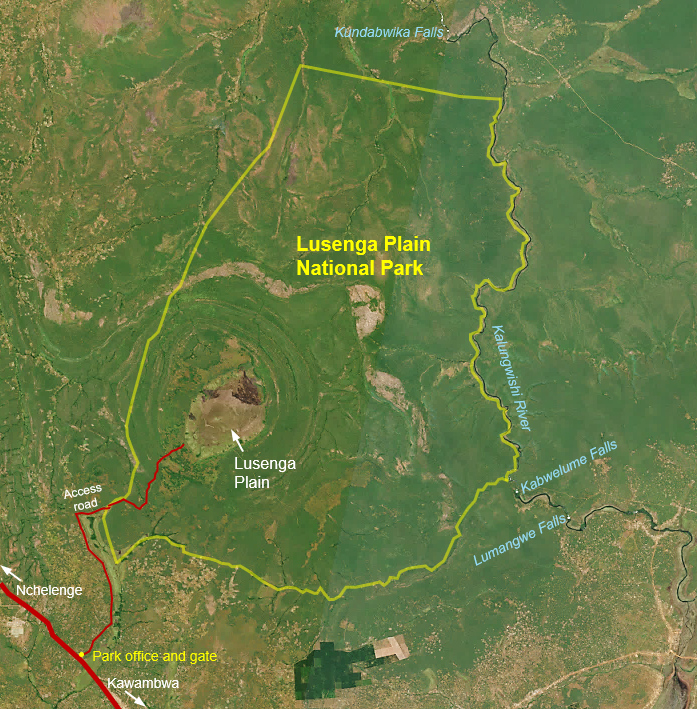
Lusenga Plain National Park annotated satellite image showing the plain, access road and Kalungwishi River

The Lusenga Plain is an oval grassland, wetland and dambo area of about 33 km^{2} in the southwest of the Park, with waterholes lasting well into the dry season. It is three-quarters surrounded by several concentric low wooded ridges, with 50 to 100 m difference in elevation between peak and trough. As seen in the accompanying satellite image, these give the appearance of an impact crater, but the accepted explanation is that they are the top of a volcanic dome with layers of different hardness, that has been eroded and weathered.

The plain is a watershed, with the highest points in the park on the innermost ring around the plain, so streams and dambos tend to radiate outwards from it: to the Kalungwishi in the north, east, and southeast, and to the Luapula and Lake Mweru in the west and southwest. Water collects in places on the plain, providing drinking water and forage for animals through the dry season, but excess rainfall drains from the plain via streams in the northeast and northwest, and via a dambo in the southwest, which is the headwaters of the Mbereshi River.

Except in dambos, riparian vegetation is found along drainage lines and small rivers in the Park is and this may take the form of dense patches and galleries of mushitu, evergreen forest which grows in swamps or permanently wet soil, contrasting sharply with the surrounding miombo, being taller, thicker and darker green. Mushitu provides the cover and a shady and more humid environment favoured by animals such as bushbuck, duikers, bushpigs, monkeys, and some birds and insects.

One of the largest rivers wholly within Zambia, the Kalungwishi River, forms the eastern boundary of the Park, though it is not accessible in the Park, except by a day's hike, and the Park is not accessible from the eastern side of the river. The river is famous for waterfalls, particularly Lumangwe Falls, but also features Kabwelume and Kundabwika Falls. However all three are outside the Park, and only accessible by roads east and north of the Park, at considerable distances away.

=== Wildlife ===
Lusenga Plain National Park is part of what has been called the Mweru–Tanganyika ecoregion that includes Mweru Wantipa National Park and Nsumbu National Park and several game management areas, and is the area of study and action of the Nsumbu Tanganyika Conservation Program (NTCP), in partnership with the DNPW, and supported by the Frankfurt Zoological Society.

Until recent times, wildlife, and in particular, elephants and other large game animals, were abundant across this ecoregion, and in the mid-19th century Swahili Arab traders such as Tippu Tip came there for ivory, as well as slaves. In subsequent colonial times, Lusenga Plain was recognised as a good hunting area, designated a Game Reserve, and made a National Park in 1972.

From the early to middle 20th century wildlife populations decreased due to poaching and bushmeat harvesting, exacerbated by a lack of management and control measures during Zambia's economic downturn in the 1980s and 90s.

With the identification of tourism as an economic goal, remediation started with the reintroduction of some species from 2007, such as Grant's zebra, puku and impala. However it has been claimed that a lack of anti-poaching measures meant that these animals too were poached, and more recent initiatives include measures such as more staff for patrols, as noted in the Park facilities section.

==== Wildlife surveys in the Park ====
There have been few surveys in recent years but the following mammals have been listed since 2013: baboon, buffalo, bushbuck, bushpig, civet, blue duiker, common duiker, yellow-backed duiker, eland, Gambian sun squirrel, genet, greater galago, hartebeest, honey badger, klipspringer, porcupine, reedbuck, roan antelope, sable antelope, serval, side-striped jackal, sitatunga, vervet monkey, warthog, zebra.

Although iconic species such as black rhino, elephant and lion have long been absent, the diversity and abundance of wildlife in the Park was considered by the NTCP in 2023 to be 'encouraging and a good foundation for ecosystem recovery'.

Surveys of wildlife, including birds, are in the External Links below.

== Park facilities ==
In May 2026 the Ministry of Tourism's and World Bank's TRALARD Project (Transforming Landscapes for Resilience and Development) commissioned assets including earth-moving equipment, 11 staff houses, an operations office and gate facility at Lusenga Plain National Park. Such investments in tourism infrastructure aim to create jobs and grow local economies through the tourism sector.

=== Roads ===
The access road, gate, offices and staff housing are on the Kawambwa–Nchelenge gravel road at 9°38′13″S 29°2′59″E, 20 km north of Kawambwa (which itself is linked by sealed roads to Mansa, the Copperbelt, the Luapula Valley, and Kasama). The access road is a basic earth road likely to require a 4WD vehicle at the height of the rainy season. The distance from the gate north-northwest to the park boundary is about 16 km, and the plain is about another 10 km further on. A bush track 22 km long encircles the plain, but it is within the miombo forest, generally set back 50-500 m from the open plain, offering few views of it. There are no vehicle tracks onto the plain, so it is necessary to walk the short distance to its edge. As of June 2026 there were no other roads in the Park, except a bush track going about 10 km to the southeast, and another going a similar distance to the northeast.

=== Park entry ===
Entry fees are paid at the Park office next to the gate. Wildlife Scouts may be available there to guide visitors (in their own vehicles) for a fee. There are no other facilities at the gate or in the park, the nearest stores, food outlets and lodges are in Kawambwa. Visitors should be self-sufficient in everything including water, as there is no accessible flowing water near the road or tracks in the Park. At one time camping in the park was permitted but this should be checked at the gate or other DNPW offices.

=== Air services ===
As of June 2026 The nearest airports with scheduled services are Mansa Airport (185 km) and Kasama Airport (299 km). The nearest civilian airstrip for charter flights is at Kawambwa (23 km).

== Hydroelectric power proposals on the Kalungwishi River ==
The hydroelectric power potential of the Kalungwishi River has been identified by the Lunzua Power Company with proposals for a total of 247 MW power generating plants at Kabweluma and Kundabwika Falls. These stations and construction access would probably be outside the Park but transmission lines might cross the park. No construction schedule has been announced.

== Other tourist attractions: distances from the Park ==
The following cultural sites and tourist attractions in northern Luapula Province and its border on the Kalungwishi River, are outside the Park, but sometimes linked in itineraries with it. Distances from the Park gate are in brackets.

- Ntumbachusi Falls, Kawambwa (38 km)
- Senior Chief Mushota's Chishinga Malaila Ceremony Arena, Mushota (57 km)
- Lake Mweru at Nchelenge (64 km)
- Mwata Kazembe's Mutomboko Ceremony Arena, Kazembe (71 km)
- Lumangwe Falls, Kalungwishi River (91 km)
- Kundabwika Falls, Kalungwishi River (150 km)
