= Monuments and Historic Sites of Zambia =

This article gives lists of the National Monuments and other historic sites of Zambia, with a one- or two-line description providing links to details given on other pages.

== National Heritage Conservation Commission ==
The Institution mandated by Cap 173 of the Laws of Zambia to manage and Conserve Zambia's outstanding Cultural and Natural Heritage resources is the National Heritage Conservation Commission (NHCC) which has its headquarters in Lusaka. According to ICOMOS (see references), the NHCC's profile report, it lists over 4000 heritage sites in Zambia, including:

- historic/architectural/buildings (over 384 sites)
- historic sites (over 180 sites)
- anthropological sites (over 189 sites)
- engineering industrial structures (over 62 sites)
- archaeological sites (over 2000 sites)
- geomorphological sites, geophysical sites, palaeontological, ecology and other sites.

However, only about 35% of the country's land area has been adequately surveyed for cultural heritage and, due to a shortage of funds, the condition of most of the listed sites is not known, however, the Commission with the assistance from Government has been making strides to ensure more sites are surveyed and opened to the public. So far out of the 4,000 cultural and natural heritage sites, 101 are declared National Monuments.

Under the National Heritage Conservation Commission Act of 1989, Section 27, heritage sites can be declared as 'National Monuments' by the Minister, and they then become protected and regulated by the details of the Act. They are listed below, grouped under various headings for ease of reference (these are not headings used in the Act).

== NHCC Declared National Monuments ==
=== Prehistoric Monuments ===
1. Ayrshire Farm Rock Engravings, Lusaka
2. Chifubwa Stream Cave 6.4 km from Solwezi at 12°13' S 26°25' E.
3. Gwisho Hot-Springs, Lochinvar National Park, Monze: Late Stone Age human skeletons from about 4,000 years ago.
4. Ing-ombe Ilede, Lusitu, is an archaeological site near the town of Siavonga, at 16°11' S 28°19' E.
5. Kalemba Rock Shelter, Chadiza District, with many rock paintings, at 14°7' S 32°30' E.
6. Kalundu Mound, Kalomo, site of a village from at least the ninth century until the twelfth century.
7. Kasamba Stream Grinding Grooves, Samfya — Iron Age site 1.6 km south of boma where axes and iron implements were sharpened, at 11°20' S 29°33' E.
8. Kundabwika Rock Painting — near Kundabwika Falls, 96 km north-west of Mporokoso at 9°13' S 29°19' E.
9. Leopards Hill Cave, Lusaka District.
10. Libala Limestone, Lusaka next to Lusaka Primary School along Chilimbulu road.
11. Makwe Rock Shelter, Katete: Late Stone Age site which yielded many tools, (6000 years old) 3.2 km S of Kondwelani School, at 14°24' S, 31°56' E
12. Maramba Quarry Site, Livingstone — first stratified site of the Middle Pleistocene Hope Fountain Culture in Southern Africa, north side of town.
13. Mkomo Rock Shelter — Iron Age rock shelter and paintings, 64 km west of Chipata at 13°54' S 32°12' E.
14. Mumbwa Caves — in Central Province these caves contain burial sites and evidence of iron smelting and are the site of the Kaonde people's Musaka Jikubi Ceremony. 14°59' S 27°02' E.
15. Munwa Stream Rock Engravings — in Mwense district at 10°29' S 28°40' E.
16. Mwela Rock Paintings, Kasama, 4.8 km from centre, north of the Kasama-Isoka road at 10°10' S 31°13' E.
17. Nachikufu Cave, Mpika District — 18,000-year-old rock paintings in a cave at 12°15' S 31°10' E.
18. Nachitalo Hill, Mkushi District — rock art 55 km south of Ndola near Msofu mission at 13°32' S 28°59' E.
19. Nsalu Cave & Rock Painting, Serenje District — 12,000-year-old rock paintings 30 km north of Kanona at 12°40 ' S 30°45' E.
20. Nyambwezu Rock Shelter, Mwinilunga District, at Nyambwezu Falls, with paintings similar to Chifubwa Stream Cave, probably about 3,000 years old, at 12°00' 25°10' E.
21. Rocklands Farm Rock Paintings 16.km SE of Chipata, two groups of rock paintings on the west side of Katotola Kopje.
22. Sebanzi Hill, Lochinvar National Park, Monze: 2.7 km WSW of the ranch House, the site of a large Iron Age Village, apparently occupied by the ancestors of the Tonga tribe from about A.D. 1100.
23. Sutherland's Farm Site, Livingstone, including two former terraces of the Maramba River, the lower of which contains a home and workshop site of the Great Handaxe Culture.
24. Thandwe Rock Shelter, Chipata District, rock paintings, at 13°49' S 32°28' E
25. Twickenham Road Archaeological Site, Twickenham Road, Olympia Park, Lusaka.
26. Twin Rivers Kopje, 24 km south-west of Lusaka.
27. Victoria Falls Trust Area Archaeological Sites, Livingstone — 5.6 km west of town on north side of Sesheke road, Early to Later Stone Age sites which are the key for determining the Stone Age cultural sequence in the Upper Zambezi Valley
28. Zawi Hill Rock Paintings, 32 km north of Chipata near Kamukwe Village.

=== Monuments From The Colonial Era ===
1. Administrator's House, Kalomo — capital of North-Western Rhodesia, up to 1911.
2. Castle Hotel, Lundazi, built 1956.
3. Livingstone Memorial, Chitambo District — built in 1902 to mark the site where David Livingstone died in 1873.
4. Fort Elwes — fort with stone walls on the Congo Pedicle border north of Mkushi.
5. Fort Monze — 1890s, one of the earliest colonial police posts, 12 km SSW of Monze.
6. Fort Young 21 km SSE of Chipata on the Nsadzu-Mpezeni road at 13°50' S 32°40' E.
7. Mpongwe Fortified Camp, Mpongwe, consisting of a raised bank and double ditch constructed during a period of raiding into the area by the neighbours of the Lima people, probably about 1870 at 13°31' S 28°9' E.
8. Niamkolo Church, Mpulungu — the oldest surviving church building in Zambia, dating from 1895, near Mpulungu on Lake Tanganyika.
9. Nkala Old Boma — built in 1901 as a fortified police camp, at the top of Kapilika Nakalomwe Hill just outside Kafue National Park.
10. Old Drift, Livingstone — the first colonial settlement dating from the 1890s, next to a good river crossing point; its cemetery is in the game park section of the Mosi-oa-Tunya National Park.
11. Old Government House, Livingstone — the main government office and governor's residence 1907-1935 when Livingstone was the capital of North-Western Rhodesia and Northern Rhodesia.
12. Tanganyika Victoria Memorial Institute, Mbala: Technical Institute built around 1905 in memory of Queen Victoria.
13. "The Good News" Monument, Mbala District: commemorating the launching of the London Missionary Society's steamship, The Good News, in 1884. On the Lufubu (of Lofu) River about 6.4 km upstream from its mouth in Lake Tanganyika at 8°36′26″ S, 30°44′42″ E.
14. Chambeshi Monument — located near the north end of Chambeshi Bridge at the spot where German East African forces agreed a cease-fire on 14 November 1918 marking the end of World War I.

=== Independence Monuments ===
1. Bwacha House Number E1376, Musuku Road, Bwacha Township, Kabwe, where on 8 March 1958 Dr K D Kaunda was elected President of the Zambia African National Congress.
2. Chilenje House 394, Lusaka occupied by Dr. K. D. Kaunda 1960-2.
3. Former House of Rt Hon. Prime Minister Robert Gabriel Mugabe of Zimbabwe at Chalimbana Teacher Training College, Lusaka.
4. Freedom House, Freedom Way, Lusaka, from where the United National Independence Party (UNIP) manifesto of 1962 was launched.
5. Kabompo House No. J11a Kabompo Township, Kabompo, to which Dr K. D. Kaunda was restricted by the Colonial authorities from March to July, 1959.
6. Lubwa House of Dr Kenneth David Kaunda in Chinsali District at 10°35' S 32°1' E, occupied from 1945 by the first President of the Republic of Zambia while he was headmaster of Lubwa Upper Primary School.
7. Matero House No. 3144, Monze Road, Matero Township, Lusaka.
8. Old Chilenje House Number 280, Luwembu Street, Old Chilenje, Lusaka, the first office of the Zambia African National Congress.

=== Other Historic Monuments ===
1. Big Tree, Kabwe: a fig tree with a 50 m wide canopy on the east side of Broadway, which served as a meeting place on many occasions during the early years of the township's history. Visible on Google Earth at 14°26'37.8 S 28°26'32.9E.
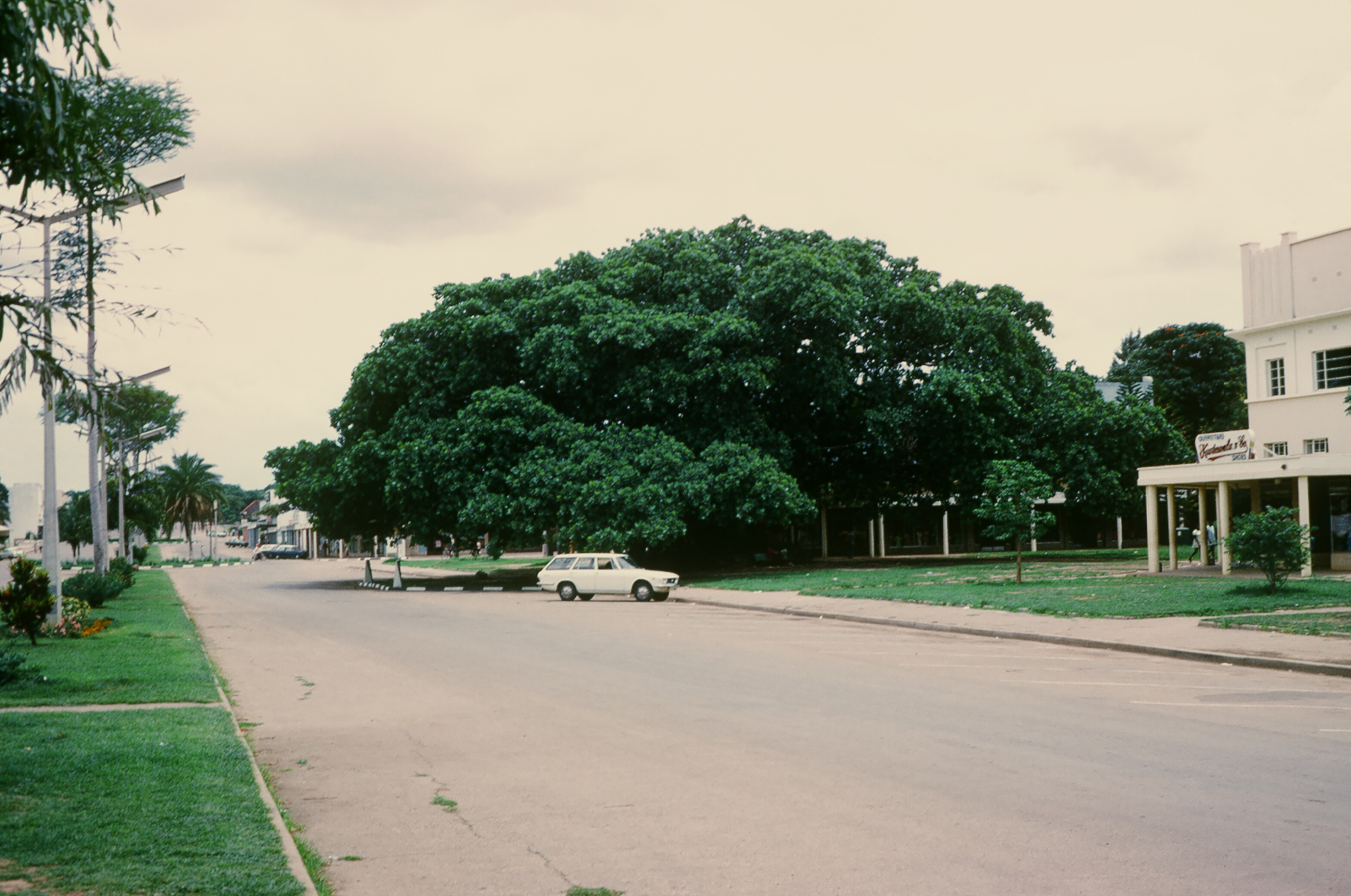
  The Big Tree National Monument cape fig tree is a prominent feature in downtown Kabwe, Zambia. It is a cool place for friendly conversations; and to wait for a taxi or driving instructor.
2. Chichele Mofu Tree − a large Mofu mahogany tree in Chichele National Forest 13 km west of Ndola.
3. Dag Hammarskjöld Crash Site Memorial — where the then United Nations Secretary-General was killed in a plane crash on 18 September 1961, in the Ndola West Forest Reserve about 11 km west of Ndola at 12°58'32 S 28°31'13 E.
4. Football Heroes Burial Site, Independence Stadium, Lusaka, where 30 victims of the 1993 Gabon Air Disaster are buried including the 18 members of the Zambia national football team.
5. Ntembwe of Mwase Lundazi — an irregular earthwork bank and ditch which was a baKafula village until about 1850, in Lundazi at 12°24' S 33°22' E.
6. Central Offices or Old Secretariat (now Cabinet Office), on Independence Avenue, Lusaka. Built in 1934 and site of historic legislative events important to Zambia's history during colonial and post-independence times.
7. Slave Tree, Ndola − a large fig tree at Moffat Avenue and Livingstone Road, where slaves were bought and sold by Swahili slave traders.

=== Industrial Monuments ===
1. Collier Monument — to prospector William Collier's 1902 discovery of copper ore at the Roan Antelope Mine in Luanshya.
2. Lusaka Thermal Power Station, Great East Road, Lusaka.
3. Moir And Bell Monument: Mufulira Copper Mines, where the prospectors, J. Moir and G. Bell, discovered copper-bearing ore in 1923.
4. Zambezi Sawmills (Mulobezi) Railway Locomotive Sheds at Livingstone — c1920, now the site of the Livingstone Railway Museum.
5. Kota Kota Peninsula in Gwembe Valley, Southern Province
6. Barotse Plains Cultural Landscape in Mongu. Western Province

=== Natural Monuments ===
1. Lunsemfwa Wonder Gorge and Bell Point: Mkushi District at the confluence of the Lunsemfwa and Mkushi Rivers at 14°39' S 29°07' E.
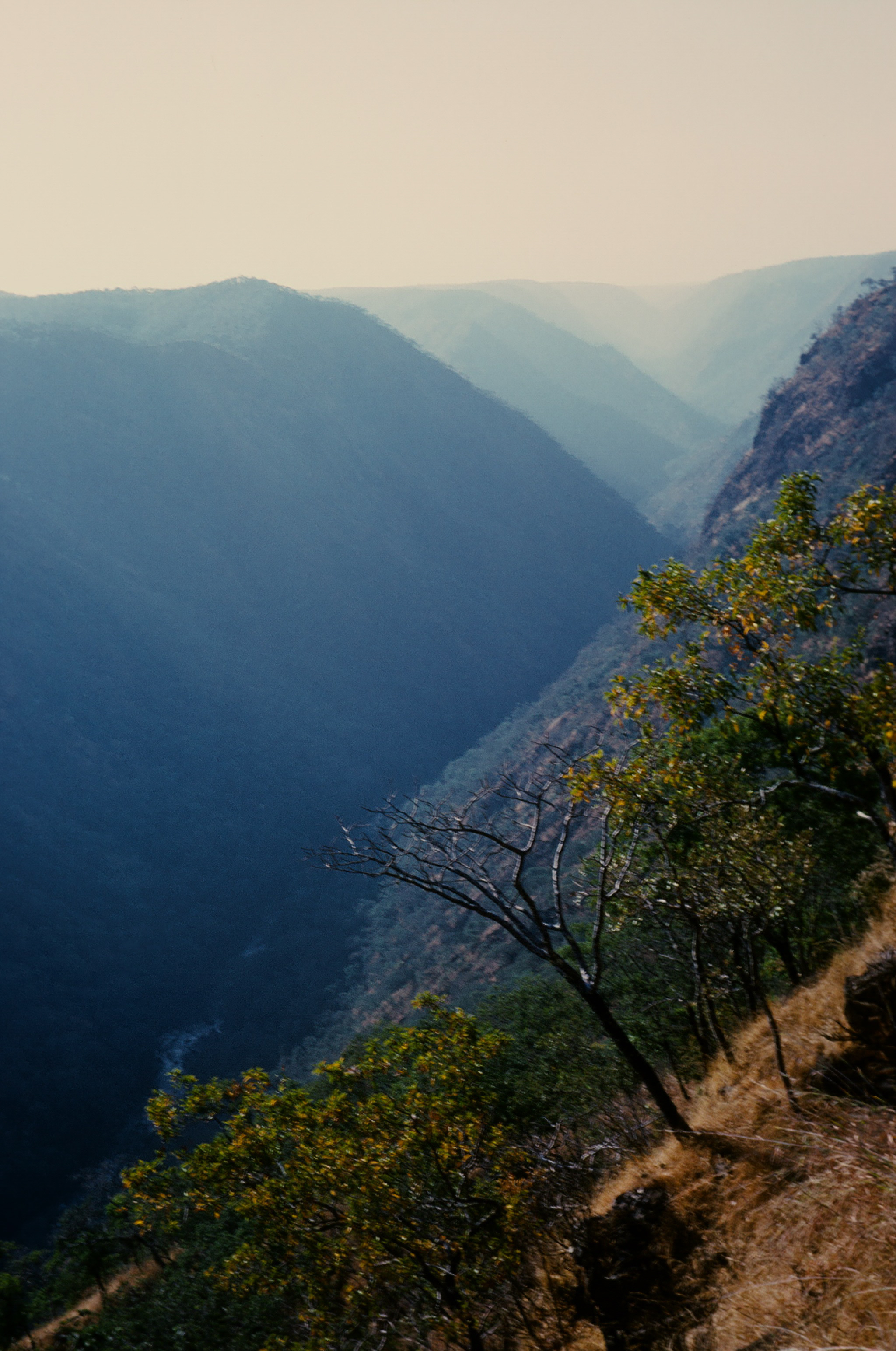
  About 75 km east-southeast of Kabwe, Zambia, the Lunsemfwa River cuts a 500m deep gash, known as The Wonder Gorge, through the lip of the Muchinga Escarpment (viewed from Bell's Point). The antenna atop the Taipei 101 skyscraper, the world's tallest building, would just protrude above the rim of this gorge.
2. Chipoma Falls on the Chimanabuwi River, 24 km SSW of Chinsali at 10°46' S 32°01' E.
3. Chirundu Fossil Forest — 50,000-year-old fossil trees, 21 km west of Chirundu at 16°02' S 28°40' E.
4. Chisimba Falls on the Luombe River 7.2 km from Chilubula Mission in Kasama District.
5. Hippo Pool, Chingola on the Kafue River.
6. Kalambo Falls, Mbala District — falls and archaeological site of early human habitation (the falls is shared with Tanzania).
7. Kundabwika Falls on the Kalungwishi River in Kaputa District at 9°13' S 29°19' E
8. Kundalila Falls on the Kaombe River, 12.8 km SE of Kanona in Serenje District.
9. Lake Chirengwa (Sunken Lake) 14 km E of Ndola at 12°58' S 28°45' E.
10. Lake Kashiba SW of Luanshya: a 100 m deep sunken lake at 13°27'S, 27°56'E.
11. Lumangwe Falls on the Kalungwishi River between Mporokoso and Kawambwa Districts at 9°32'35 S 29°23'16 E.
12. Ntumbachushi Falls on the Ngona River, Kawambwa District, at 9°52'S, 28°58'E
13. Zambezi Source, Mwinilunga District: source of the Zambezi river and a botanical reserve, part of Zambezi Source National Forest.

== List of Other Historic Sites ==
These are not declared national monuments but are probably on the larger NHCC list of historic sites. It is an informal and incomplete list of sites — please add (with references if possible) even if you are unsure of their NHCC status.

1. Chilubula Mission, Kayembi — the first mission of the White Fathers in the territory built 1895 by Father Joseph Dupont, known as 'Moto Moto', it features a large church and well-preserved buildings.
2. Otto Beit Bridge, Chirundu — 1939, first modern suspension bridge with parallel cables built outside the USA (shared with Zimbabwe).
3. High Court, Livingstone — built in 1910 to coincide with the visit of the Duke and Duchess of Connaught
4. Broken Hill Mine, Kabwe — one of the first mines in Zambia (1906) and site of the Broken Hill Man fossil find commemorated by a memorial at the municipal offices.
5. Kilwa Island, Lake Mweru — site of 19th Century slave traders’ stockade.
6. Lwimbe Petroglyphs —about 15 km west of Kasama.
7. Girls Boarding School, Mbereshi — 1915, first African girls’ school in the country, now a mission house.
8. Mulungushi Rock of Authority, Kabwe — since 1960, site of independence movement conferences.
9. Mumbwa, the first Copperbelt — the first commercial copper mines in Zambia were the Sable Antelope mine and Hippo mine in Mumbwa, now heritage sites.
10. North-Western Hotel, Livingstone — built 1909 by 'Mopane' Clarke.
11. Saint Andrews Church, Livingstone — built 1910-11 in memory of David Livingstone and still in use.
12. Shiwa House — 'manor house' built in 1922 by Sir Stewart Gore-Browne at his Shiwa Ngandu estate.
13. Victoria Falls Bridge, Livingstone — 1905, first major bridge and first railway (shared with Zimbabwe)

== See also ==
- Bibliography of the history of Zambia
