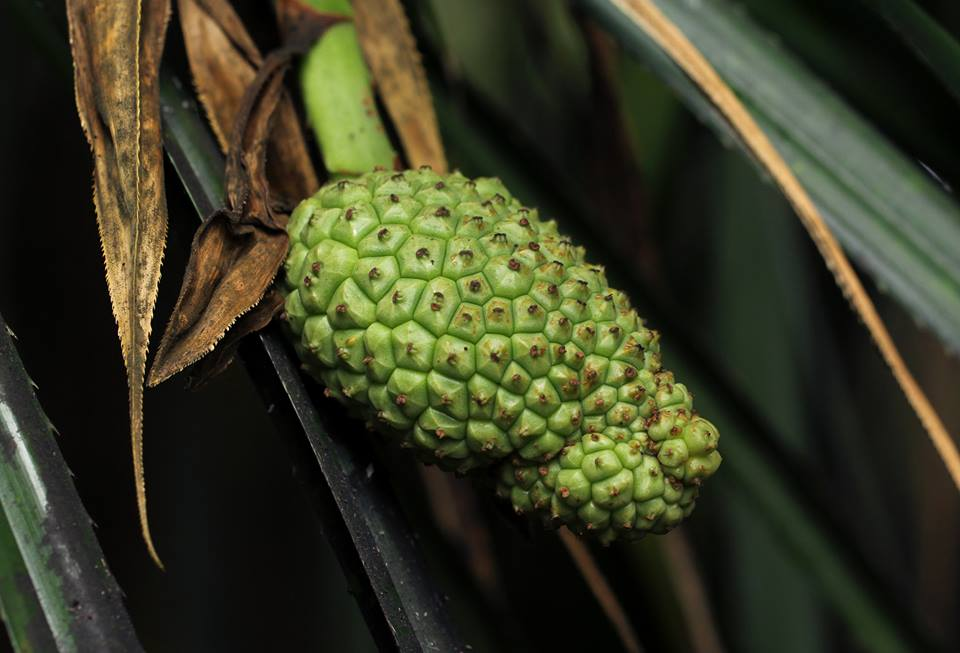
- Fruit

Scientific classification
- Kingdom: Plantae
- Clade: Tracheophytes
- Clade: Angiosperms
- Clade: Monocots
- Order: Pandanales
- Family: Pandanaceae
- Genus: Pandanus
- Species: P. livingstonianus

Binomial name
- Pandanus livingstonianus Rendle

Synonyms
- P. gasicus Huynh; P. globulatus Huynh; P. mosambicius H.St.John ex Huynh; P. petersii Warb.; P. serrimarginalis H.St.John ex Huynh

= Pandanus livingstonianus =

Species of tree

Pandanus livingstonianus Rendle is one of some 752 palaeotropical species of dioecious tree in the genus Pandanus, popularly known as Screw pines, and occurs from Angola eastwards across tropical Africa and down the east coast of Southern Africa.

Named for the Scottish explorer David Livingstone (1813-1873), this palm-like tree on stilt roots also has the appearance of a mangrove, and occurs in Mozambique, Malawi, Zambia, Zaire and Angola. Its preferred habitat is along river banks and in freshwater swamps, where it is sometimes found in extensive stands, growing to an altitude of 900 m.

The species is under threat in some areas and the Threatened Plants Programme (TPP) is salvaging plants in the Lumangwe and Kabwelume Falls areas where the Zambian government is planning hydro-electric projects. In the Zambesi Delta the species grows along riverine forest subject to seasonal flooding, intercalating with tidal forests.

Female plants produce round, compound fruit about 10–20 cm in diameter made up of merged drupes, resembling a pineapple. These turn from green to a bright reddish-orange when mature and are eaten by many animals including elephants, monitor lizards, rodents, bats and crustaceans. The timber is resistant to termites.

== Gallery ==
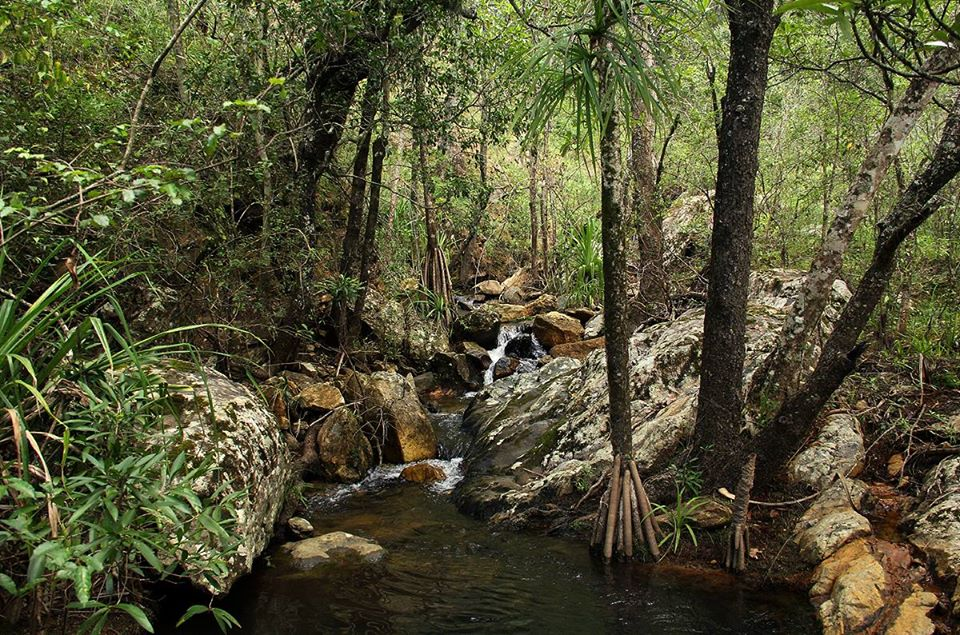
Habitat

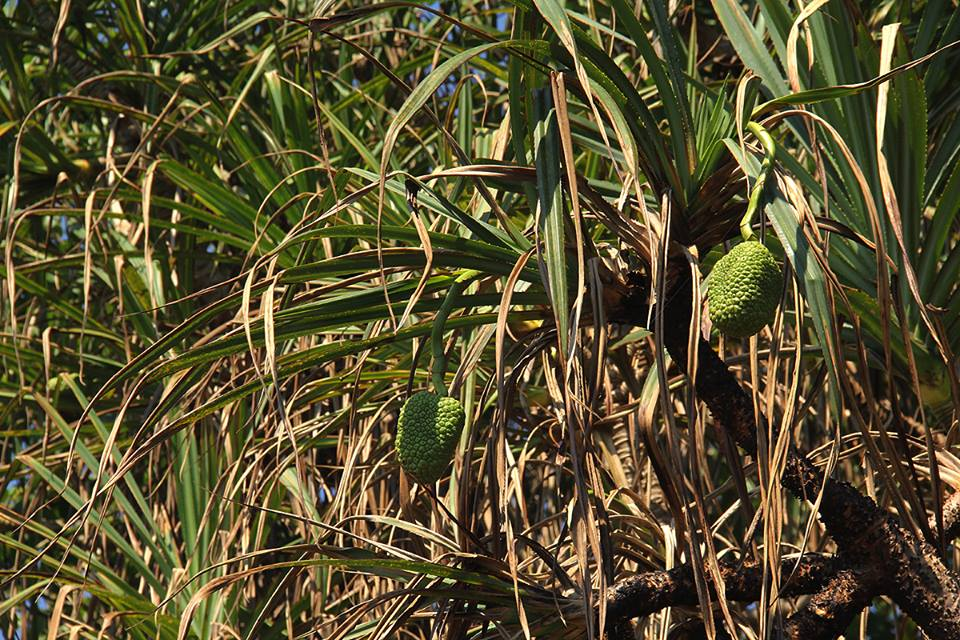
Leaves and fruit
