= List of waterfalls in Zambia =

This is a list of waterfalls in Zambia.

- Chavuma Falls
- Chilambwe Falls
- Chimpepe Falls
- Chimpolo Falls
- Chisimba Falls
- Fwaka Falls
- Kabwelume Falls
- Kalambo Falls
- Kudabwika Falls
- Kundalila Falls
- Lufubu Falls
- Lumangwe Falls
- Mpwasha Falls
- Mumbuluma Falls
- Mutumuna Falls
- Nalupembe Falls
- Ngonye Falls
- Ntumbachushi Falls
- Nyambwezi Falls
- Victoria Falls

== See also ==
- List of waterfalls
- Tourism in Zambia
