= Mutumuna Falls =

Waterfall in Zambia

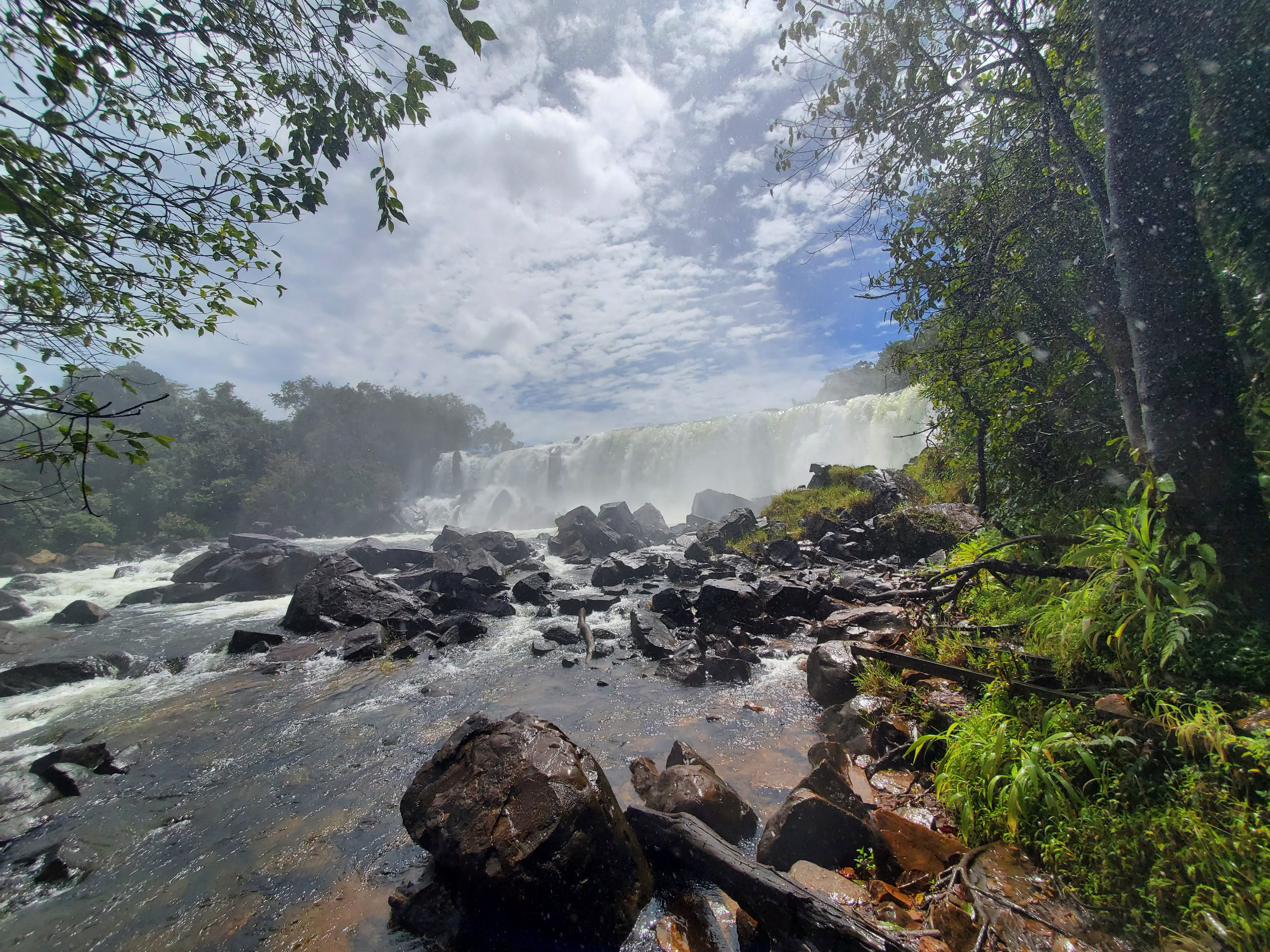
- Interactive map of Mutumuna Falls
- Location: Kasama District
- Coordinates: 10°06′18″S 30°54′56″E
- Type: Cataract
- Total height: 20 metres (66 ft)
- Number of drops: 1
- Watercourse: Luombe River

Mutumuna Falls is a wide waterfall in Zambia. It is the "Upper Fall" in the 3-falls cascade commonly referred to as the Chisimba Falls (also Chishimba Falls), in Kasama District, in the Northern Province of Zambia. Mutumuna Falls and the other two components in the cascade, host the 15 megawatts Chishimba Hydroelectric Power Station and related infrastructure, across the Luombe River.

== Location ==
Mutumuna Waterfalls are located above the Kayela Rapids and the main Chisimba Fall in the Chishimba Falls cascade, across the Luombe River. They lie off of the Kasama–Mporokoso Road (Road D20 Zambia). This is approximately 40 kilometres (25 mi), northwest of the city of Kasama, in Kasama District, in Zambia's Northern Province.

== Overview ==
The Bemba people, who are indigenous to this part of Zambia believe that the spirit of Mutumuna resides at these falls. The High Priest of Mutumuna makes regular offerings at the falls. The sacred nature of the falls "prohibits sexual intercourse, arrogance and quarrelsomeness in the vicinity of the falls".

Mutumuna Falls, Kayela Rapids and Chishimba Fall comprise the Chishimba Falls, a tourist attraction and the location of the 15 megawatts Chishimba Hydroelectric Station. A natural tropical rain forest, lodging and camping facilities are available to the public. A tourist museum is under development at the site.

== History ==
The Mutumuna Falls are a cultural heritage site for the Bemba people, going back for several centuries. In 1959, the British colonial government constructed a hydroelectric dam at these and two adjacent falls, with capacity of 900,000 watts (0.9 MW). This was intended to supply electricity to the town of Kasama and surrounding communities. In 1971, the power station was expanded to a new capacity of 6 MW. During the early 2020s, Chishimba Hydroelectric Power Station is undergoing rehabilitation and expansion to a new capacity of 15 MW, using funds loaned by the KfW Development Bank of Germany.

== See also ==
- List of waterfalls
- List of waterfalls of Zambia
- List of power stations in Zambia
