= Mumbuluma Falls =

Waterfall in Zambia

Coordinates: 10°55′48″S 28°44′12″E

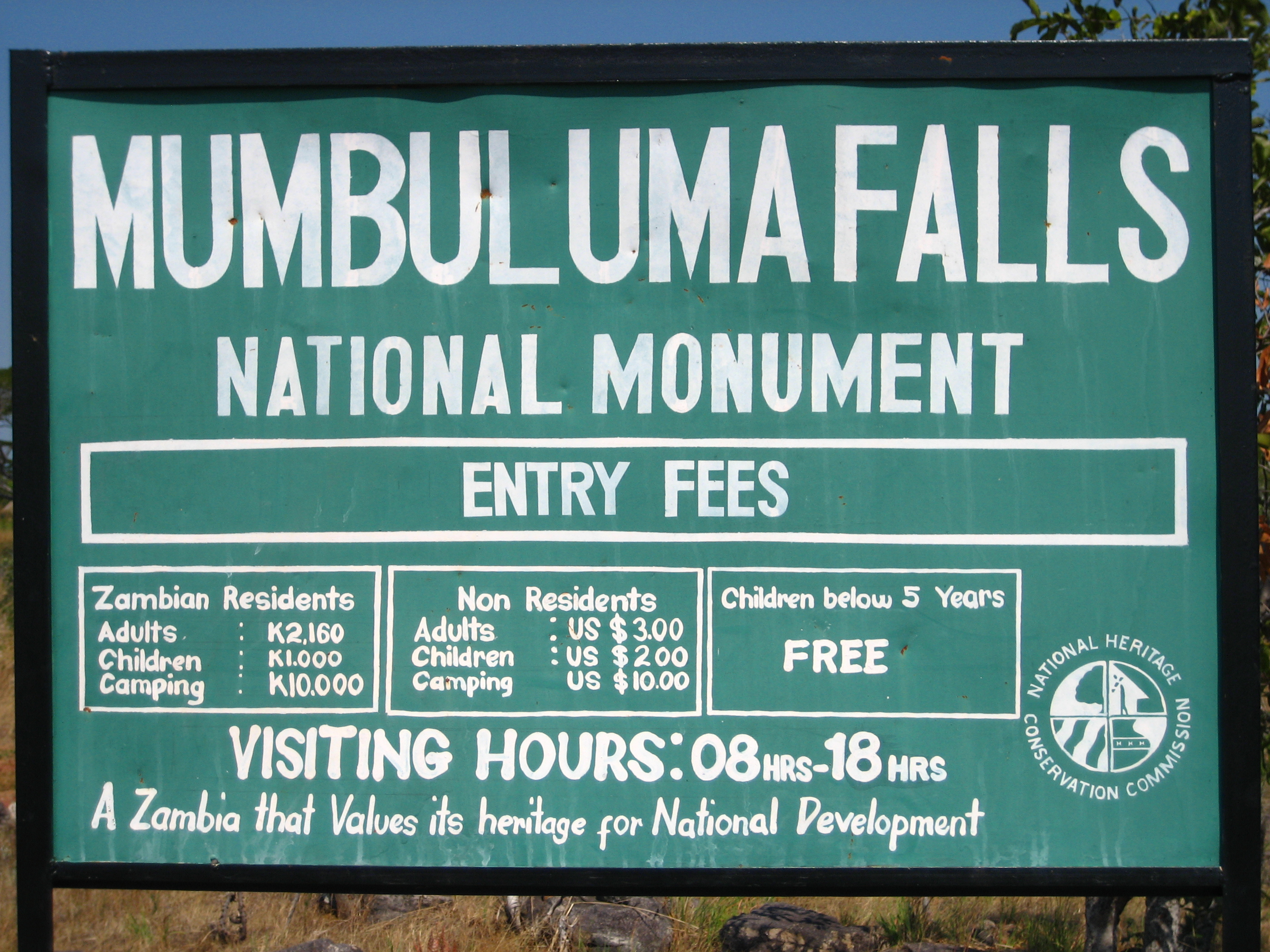
Entrance sign to the falls

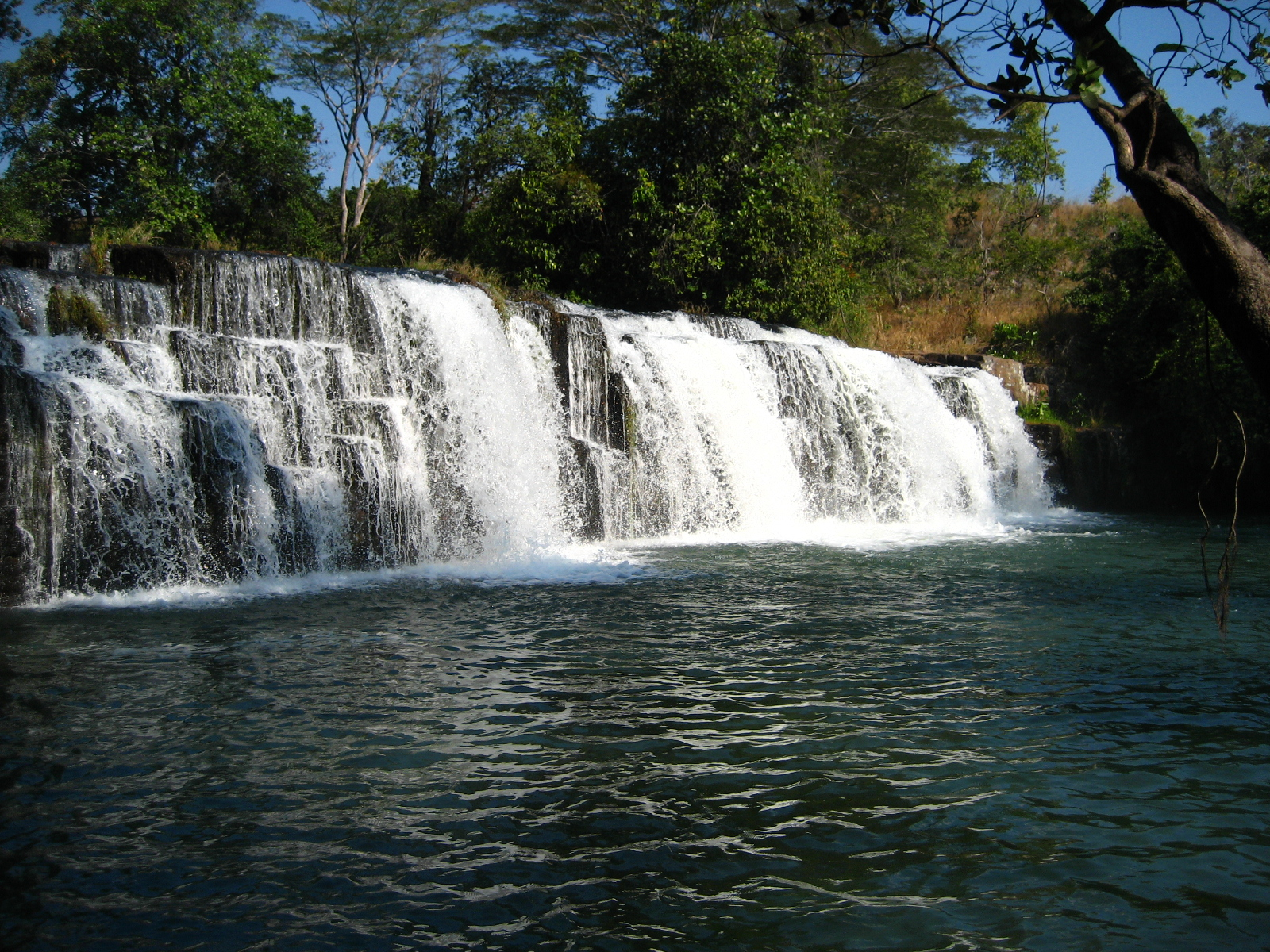
The lower falls

Mumbuluma Falls are a set of waterfalls just outside Mansa, Zambia in the Luapula Province. The waterfalls are a national monument of Zambia.

Mumbuluma Falls is made up of two waterfalls occurring in succession, an upper and lower falls.

== See also ==
- List of waterfalls
- List of waterfalls of Zambia
