= Kalungwishi River =

Location
- Country: Zambia
- Region: Luapula Province
- Region: Northern Province

Physical characteristics
- Source
  - location: Near Mukupa Kaoma, Northern Province
  - elevation: 1535 m
- Mouth
  - location: Lake Mweru
  - elevation: 917 m
- Length: 328 km

The Kalungwishi River is one of the largest rivers wholly within Zambia, in the Northern and Luapula Provinces, and is famous for its Lumangwe Falls. It rises on the Kasama-Mporokoso plateau and discharges into Lake Mweru so is part of the upper reaches of the Congo River basin.

== The course of the Kalungwishi ==
=== Source and upper river ===
The source of the Kalungwishi River is a dambo at an elevation of about 1535 m in Lunte District, Northern Province, 13 km NNW of the small town of Mukupa Kaoma. The source can be considered to be the dambo, or a spring furthest from its exit, in mushitu riparian forest at its eastern end, at a slightly higher elevation, location 9°49'49"S 30°26'06"E.

The river channel emerges from the dambo and meanders westwards through a floodplain comprising dambos, riparian forest and wetlands, draining the plateau in a dendritic drainage pattern surrounded by miombo woodland. At its confluence with its tributary the Ngona River (which on some maps is marked as the main channel of the Kalungwishi) it becomes the border between the Northern and Luapula Provinces almost as far as its mouth at the lake.

The main channel broadens to about 30 m wide as it reaches the end of the flat part of the plateau and, leaving behind its dambo margins, it forms rapids and low waterfalls as it winds northwest through gaps in a series of low ridges, each with a lower elevation on its the other side, like steps. It loses 170 m of height over 20 km in a remote, unpopulated and well wooded area.

=== The middle river ===
The descent ends at another relatively flat area of plateau between Kawambwa and Mporokoso, with an average elevation of about 1220 m. There the river meanders westwards through another floodplain of dambos and wetlands, up to 2 km wide, but with more oxbow lakes and abandoned channels, and scattered patches and galleries of mushitu.

The Kalungwishi skirts the northern end of a major wetland system in the Mushota agricultural area of Kawambwa District, where fertile peninsulas of drier ground among the dambos support plantations of avocado, sugar, tea, maize and other crops. In this area are the confluences of two major tributaries. The first is the Luangwa, a smaller namesake of the famous Eastern Province river; this Luangwa has its source only 10 km northeast of the Kalungwishi's source, flowing north before turning west, through very similar country. Not only is it bigger than the Kalungwishi at the confluence, being about 45 m wide versus 30 m wide, its source is further east and it is longer above the confluence than the Kalungwishi.

The second tributary is the Pambeshe River, on some maps marked as the Luena or Luongo, rivers in the same wetland system, but further south. The Pambeshe has a channel about 30 m wide in a dambo and wetland channel 1‒3 km wide. Downstream of these confluences the Kalungwishi has a channel 70 m wide and a floodplain about 800 m wide. It flows north then northwest and becomes faster flowing, with rapids at Chimpempe Falls, just before its spectacular plunge of 35 metres at Lumangwe Falls. Below that it flows in a narrow valley with steep sides, and beyond Kabweluma Falls 6 km further on, if forms the eastern boundary of Lusenga Plain National Park. This section of the river is in remote, unpopulated country. Its overall direction is north, winding between hills in a steep-sided valley up to about 80 m deep, until it has descended onto the gently undulating wooded plain below the escarpment that forms the northern edge of the Kawambwa-Mporokoso part of the plateau.

The Itabu River joins it from the east just before the northern border of the National Park goes off west. The last major falls, Kundabwika Falls, is a little further on. Its height is 25 m and its width about 70 m, and particularly in the wet season the water curtain is deep, uniform and unbroken, impressive in its power. Below the falls the river flows in a gorge with rocky sides, about 2 km in length.

=== The lower river, delta and mouth ===
Now in its lower course, and flowing through its most populated and farmed area, the river at an elevation of 965 m opens up into a floodplain with wetlands. Near the village of Nkoshya it meets the Mofwe coming from the northeast, a swampy channel about 700 m wide at the confluence but of variable width up, to 3.5 km broad higher up, and about 40 km long, that connects the river to Lake Mweru Wantipa at roughly the same elevation, 945 m. The Mofwe is not a single river but has multiple narrow channels and may be flooded at the height of the rainy season, but appears quite dry, though covered in papyrus, Phragmites reeds, and other sedges and grasses in the dry season. When Mweru Wantipa experiences good rainy season inflows and its level rises, water flows southeast from the lake to the Kalungwishi, but when the river is high and the lake is low, water flow through the Mofwe can reverse direction, and the Mweru Wantipa is replenished by the river. This appears to be the key to the lake’s varying level and margins.

After the Mofwe confluence, the Kalungwishi meanders through a wetland up to 3.5 km wide before squeezing through a 60-metre gap in slightly higher dry ground at Mununga, site of only the second bridge across the river, and the only town on its banks. In three places, one upstream of the town and two within it, the river channel breaks up into short sections of multiple rocky channels and islands, with rapids. From the town to where its delta starts, the land beside the river is quite intensively farmed, and fish traps and nets are set along the banks on structures protruding up to 30 m from the banks.

The rapids at Mununga prevent the Kalungwishi, unlike the Luapula, being used for river transport inland from the lake. Its extensive meandering in the delta work against it even being used by boats up to the rapids — 20 km of river covers a straight-line distance of only 12 km.

The swampy delta area is about 37 km^{2} and includes floating papyrus islands. Its northern edge is marked by a narrow sandspit 7.5 km long with a beach on the lake side and a lagoon with a few sand islands on the inside. Fishing camps are set up this sandspit but Mununga's main concentration of fishing boats and related housing and businesses on the lakeshore is only 6km by road from the centre of the town to the northwest.

There is one main channel through the delta discharging into Lake Mweru at a surface elevation of 917 m. The river's average flow rate is 136 m^{3}/s measured at Kundabwika, making it the second largest tributary of the lake after the Luapula with an average flow rate of 741 m^{3}/s measured at the Kashiba gauge.

== History along the Kalungwishi ==
=== The Eastern Lunda of Mwata Kazembe ===
In the 19th century the Kalungwishi River from around Lumangwe Falls to its mouth was the northeastern border of the Eastern Lunda of Mwata Kazembe who were centred on the lower Luapula. Travellers who wanted to cross into Mwata Kazembe’s territory were expected to send a message to his capital next to the Mofwe Lagoon requesting permission, and would be confronted by locals if they did not. Once permission was granted, the local village headmen would send runners to give Mwata Kazembe news of their progress. Mwata Kazembe had been known to the outside world since Portuguese traders and slavers on the Atlantic and Indian Ocean coasts of southern Africa had probed inland in the 17th century, but Lacerda, the first Portuguese visitor to Kazembe came from the southeast and did not cross the Kalungwishi.

=== Conflict with coastal slave and ivory traders ===
Swahili Arab traders in slaves and ivory from Ujiji and Zanzibar, the most prominent of whom was Tippu Tip, established bases at Nsumbu and elsewhere in the southwestern Lake Tanganyika to Lake Mweru area, and defeated its most powerful ruler, Chief Nsama of the Tabwa people. Some of these traders came into Kazembe’s area and caused conflict, so Mwata Kazembe Muonga Sunkutu expelled them north of the Kalungwishi. However a former Mwata, Lukwesa Mpanga, allied himself with Tippu Tip, whose forces armed with muskets attacked the Lunda at the Kalungwishi and defeated them. It was the rainy season and the Kalungwishi was too swollen for Tippu Tip’s caravan to cross, they had to go upstream to find crossing place, and were attacked there by Kazembe’s forces. Tippu Tip brought in reinforcements and eventually after more warfare he defeated Mwata Kazembe and later installed Lukwesa Mpanga as Mwata Kazembe.

=== David Livingstone on the Kalungwishi ===
In his final expedition searching for the source of the Nile, the Scottish missionary explorer David Livingstone crossed the Kalungwishi the first time by canoe on 12 November 1867, somewhere near Mununga, on his way from the northern end of Mweru to his first meeting with Mwata Kazembe, in the company of Swahili Arab traders. He wrote that the river was 60 m wide and flowing strongly, though not yet replenished by the rainy season. He described how fishermen caught fish in the river with weirs, nets, and hooks, and listed the local names of 39 species of fish caught as they come up the river from the lake. He returned by the same route on 11 January when his party shot a buffalo on the ‘Kalungwishi Meadows’, the swampy delta at the lake (or in the river swamps just before it). He reported that they saw zebra and elephants and were warned that lions and leopards were common.

Livingstone went back north in January 1868 and came back south across the Kalungwishi for the third time on 29th April 1868 when making his second visit to Kazembe’s, after which he went on to explore Lake Bangweulu. From there he returned to the north of Lake Mweru following a due north route on the Kawambwa plateau, intersecting the Kalungwishi at Kabwelume Falls on the western bank. He continued following the Kalungwishi north, noting the prevalence of game animals, and that he crossed it twice more, the last time to the northern bank at a ford called Masolo. His last crossing of the Kalungwishi was four years later, near the confluence with the Pambeshe River, about six months before his death in May 1873. His travels inspired British missionaries and colonialists to start visiting the area in the following decades.

=== The BSAC's Kalungwishi Boma ===
Colonial rule came to the area when the British South Africa Company sent Alfred Sharpe from the British Central Africa Protectorate (now Malawi) to establish treaties with chiefs in the area between Lakes Mweru and Tanganyika. Sharpe was successful with Chief Kazembe and Chief Nsama who signed his treaties in November 1892 in return for British protection against the Swahili Arabs. The British aims were to end the slave trade, and to replace the Arabs in the control of commerce and sovereignty. To support the treaties, Sharpe and the BSAC established bomas in several northern locations including one named Kalungwishi at Mununga in 1894.

== Tourism and the Kalungwishi ==
The tourism jewel in Kalungwishi's crown is Lumangwe Falls. Access to it and the smaller waterfall Kabwelume downstream has been improved with signposting and the building of paths and steps to viewing areas. At Lumangwe there is also a visitor centre. Kundabwika Falls and its impressive rocky gorge, the most remote of the three large falls, has had no improvements to access and is reached only by a bush track that may require a 4WD vehicle, and it can be hard to view because of dense surrounding forest.

In Kalungwishi's upper course there are five small waterfalls in the remote hilly country between 9°48'01.15"S 29°51'54.84"E and 9°42'19.27"S 29°47'12.54"E : Kalonde, Chibunda, Nakapoko, Chifulu, and Mbulomatuto Kamilisa Falls. As of June 2026 these have no road access and represent an opportunity to develop future sightseeing and adventure tourism.

Lusenga Plain National Park lies on the western bank of the river in the section between Kabweluma and Kundabwika Falls, but there is nowhere to cross from the eastern bank of the river, where the falls are accessed, into the Park; and there are no roads in the Park to the river, so hiking is the only option to reach the river from the Park. The Park went into decline during a couple of decades of neglect but wildlife protection and visitor facilities are being upgraded. The Park and the Kalungwishi waterfalls, as well as Lake Bangweulu, Lake Mweru, Mweru Wantipa National Park and Nsumbu National Park are seen as part of a 'Northern Tourism Circuit' which the Ministry of Tourism aims to boost.

== Hydroelectric power proposals on the Kalungwishi River ==
The Lunzua Power Company has proposed a project, listed as an investment opportunity by SADC, to construct hydroelectric power plants at Kabweluma and Kundabwika Falls with a total of 247 MW.
