= Chisimba Falls =

Waterfalls in Zambia

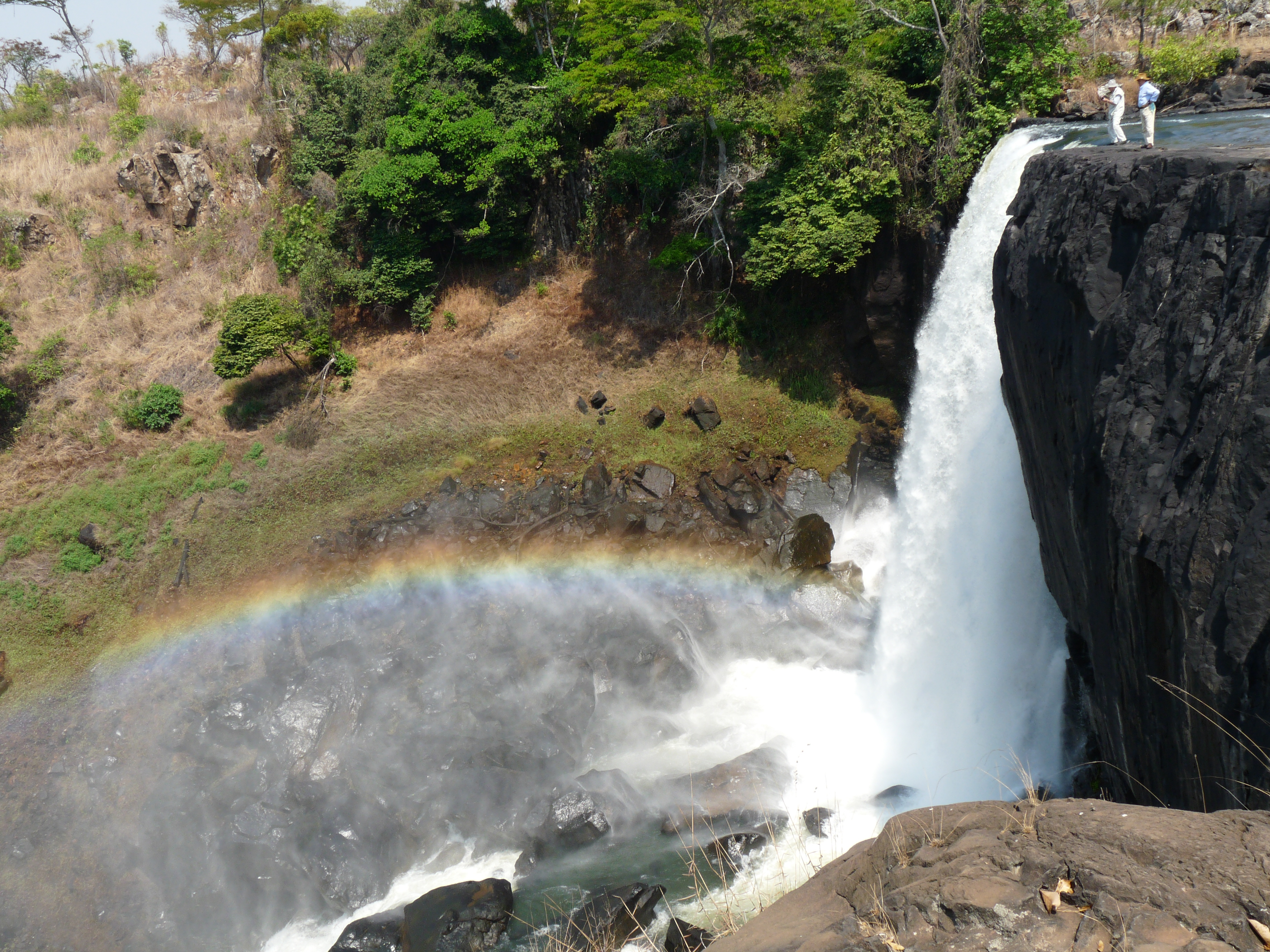
- Upper Fall
- Interactive map of Chisimba Falls
- Location: Kasama District
- Coordinates: 10°06′30″S 30°55′03″E
- Type: Cataract
- Total height: 60 metres (197 ft)
- Number of drops: 3
- Watercourse: Luombe River

Chisimba Falls, also Chishimba Falls is a series of waterfalls located in Kasama District, in the Northern Province of Zambia. The waterfalls host the Chishimba Hydroelectric Power Station. The scenic views around the falls, together with a museum under development, are major tourist attractions.

== Location ==
The falls are located approximately 40 kilometres (25 mi), northwest of the city of Kasama, in Kasama District, in Zambia's Northern Province, off of the Kasama–Mporokoso Road (Road D20). The geographical coordinates of Chishimba Falls are: 10°06'30.0"S, 30°55'03.0"E (Latitude:-10.108333; Longitude:30.917500).

== Overview ==
The waterfall complex comprises three separate waterfalls spread over a distance of about 300 metres (984 ft) along the Luombe River, as it flows in a general north to south direction. The upper falls are called Mutumuna Falls. Here the river drops approximately 20 metres (66 ft). The middle falls are known as the Kayela Rapids, where the river ripples down about 10 metres (33 ft). The lower falls are the main Chishimba Fall, where the river drops another estimated 30 metres (98 ft). This is a total drop of about 60 metres (197 ft).

== Local attractions ==
A hydro-electric power plant, the 15 MW Chishimba Hydroelectric Power Station, that is owned and operated by ZESCO, is located at these falls. First commissioned in 1959, as a 0.9 MW installation, the power station was expanded to 6 MW in 1971. In the early 2020s the capacity of this mini-hydropower plant is under expansion to 15 megawatts.

The Chishimba Falls belong to the Monuments and Historic Sites of Zambia.

== See also ==
- List of waterfalls
- List of waterfalls of Zambia
- List of power stations in Zambia

== Notes ==
- Leaflet "Chishimba falls", National Heritage Conservation Commission, 2009
- Zambia's waterfall Wonderland: Zambia Tourism
- The Geographical Journal, Vol 86, No 4 (Oct 1935), pp. 356–357: JSTOR 1786226
- Bradt Travel Guide, p. 339, at Google Books
