= Chishimba Hydroelectric Power Station =

Power station in Zambia

Isimba Hydroelectric Power Station
- Map of Zambia showing the location of Chishimba Falls. Isimba Hydroelectric Power Station (Africa) Isimba Hydroelectric Power Station (Earth)
- Country: Zambia
- Location: Chishimba Falls, Kasama District
- Coordinates: 10°07′08″S 30°54′52″E
- Purpose: Power
- Status: Operational
- Construction cost: US$46 million
- Owner: Government of Zambia
- Operator: Zambia Electricity Supply Corporation Limited

Dam and spillways
- Impounds: Luombe River

Power Station
- Turbines: 3 x 5 MW
- Installed capacity: 15 megawatts (20,000 hp)
- Annual generation: 73 GWh

Chishimba Hydroelectric Power Station is a 15 megawatts (20,000 hp) hydroelectric power station that sits across the Luombe River in Zambia. The power station, first commissioned in 1959, was rehabilitated and expanded in 1971 and again expanded and modernized in the 2020s. This power station is owned by the Government of Zambia and is operated and maintained by Zambia Electricity Supply Corporation Limited (ZESCO), the national electricity utility company. The energy generated here is distributed to the city of Kasama and other parts of Kasama District.

== Location ==
The power station is located at Chishimba Falls, across the Luombe River, in Kasama District, in the Northern Province of Zambia. This is approximately 40 kilometres (25 mi), by road, northwest of the city of Kasama, the district and provincial capital. The geographical coordinates of Chishimba HPP are: 10°07'08.0"S, 30°54'52.0"E (Latitude:-10.118889; Longitude:30.914444).

== History ==
The power station was first commissioned in 1959 with generation capacity of 0.9 MW. The power station went through rehabilitation and expansion, concluding in 1971, with new generating capacity of 6 MW.

== Rehabilitation and expansion in the 2020s ==
In November 2020, ZESCO, who own and operate the power station advertised for qualified consulting engineering firms to bid for the job of Owner's Engineer on the project of rehabilitation of the 6 MW power station and expansion to a new 15 MW powerhouse.

Work involves converting part of the old power station into a tourist museum. Three new electric turbines, each rated at 5 MW will be installed, for a generation capacity calculated at 73 GWh annually. Two new switchyards one of 66 kV and the other of 33 kV will be constructed next to the powerhouse. High voltage transmission lines will connect these switchyards to the existing Kasama substation, where the power will integrate into the Zambian national grid.

Funding for this work reported to amount to US$46 million has been sourced from KfW Development Bank.

== See also ==
- List of power stations in Zambia
