= Nyambwezi Falls =

Zambian waterfall and archaeological site

Coordinates: 11°54′16″S 25°05′44″E

Nyambwezi Falls is a waterfall located in the North-Western Province of Zambia. They are approximately 20 metres (66 ft) high. Close to the lip of the falls, there is a rock shelter, which has petroglyphs and other evidence of late Stone Age occupation.

== See also ==
- List of waterfalls
- List of waterfalls of Zambia
