= Achitende =

- Location in Zambia
- Coordinates: 10°9′S 31°14′E
- Country: Zambia
- Province: Northern Province
- District: Kasama District
- Climate: Cwa

Achitende is a town in north-eastern Zambia. It is located in Kasama District in Northern Province.
