= Kawambwa District =

Coordinates: 9°45′S 29°20′E

- District
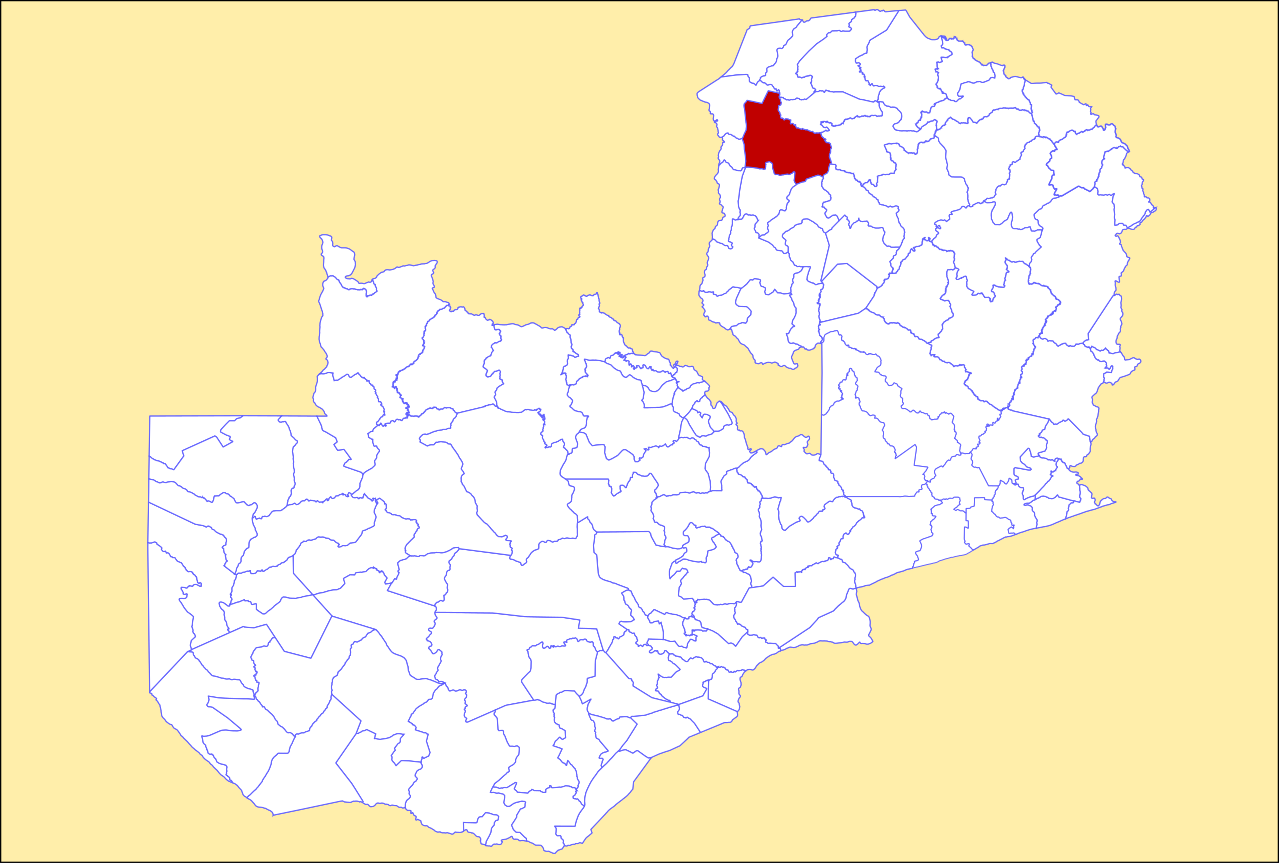
- District location in Zambia
- Country: Zambia
- Province: Luapula Province
- Capital: Kawambwa

Area
  - Total: 8,101.3 km^{2} (3,127.9 sq mi)

Population (2022)
  - Total: 123,652
  - Density: 15.263/km^{2} (39.532/sq mi)
- Time zone: UTC+2 (CAT)

Kawambwa District is a district of Zambia, located in Luapula Province. The capital lies at Kawambwa, which lies at the intersection of three roads: D19, M13, and Kawambwa-Mbereshi. As of the 2022 Zambian Census, the district had a population of 123,652 people. It consists of two constituencies, namely Kawambwa and Pambashe.

Climate change led to both floods and drought in Kawambwa District in 2008, thus hampering the activities of subsistence farmers.

Lusenga Plain National Park, which was converted from a hunting area, is an 880 square kilometer park in the district's northern corner.
