= Lukulu Airport =

Airport in Zambia

- IATA: LXU; ICAO: FLLK

Summary
- Airport type: Public
- Serves: Lukulu, Zambia
- Elevation AMSL: 3,480 ft / 1,061 m
- Coordinates: 14°22′30″S 23°15′00″E

Map
- Location of the airport in Zambia

Runways
Direction	Length		Surface
Direction	m	ft	Surface
08/26	1,215	3,986	Dirt
- Sources: GCM Google Maps

Lukulu Airport (IATA: LXU, ICAO: FLLK) is an airport serving Lukulu, a city in the Western Province of Zambia.

The airport is within the city. West approach and departure cross the Zambezi River.

== See also ==
- Transport in Zambia
- List of airports in Zambia
