= Chavuma Falls =

Small waterfall on the Zambezi in Zambia

Coordinates: 13°05′45″S 22°41′08″E

Chavuma Falls is a small waterfall on the Zambezi River in northwestern Zambia close to the town of Chavuma, lying immediately south of the border with Angola. During the wet season, the waterfalls are generally overwhelmed by the flow of the river but become visible as the dry season progresses. The falls have a mean annual discharge of 555 m^{3}/s and are only a few meters high. In 2018, Zambia proposed to develop a hydroelectric power station at Chavuma Falls to boost energy production and stimulate economic activities in the area.

== See also ==
- List of waterfalls
- List of waterfalls of Zambia
