= Kawambwa =

- Town
- Location in Zambia
- Coordinates: 9°47′29″S 29°04′44″E
- Country: Zambia
- Province: Luapula Province
- District: Kawambwa District
- Time zone: UTC+2 (CAT)

Kawambwa is a town in the Zambian province of Luapula located on the edge of the northern Zambian plateau above the Luapula valley at an altitude of 1300 m. It was chosen as an administrative district of the same name by the British colonial authorities who preferred the climate of the plateau rather than the hotter valley where most of the district's population live, and it continues as an administrative district today.

Kawambwa sits at the junction of tarred roads to Nchelenge, Mporokoso, Mushota and Mansa, and Mbereshi linking with the Zambia Way, the main tarred highway of the Luapula Province through Mwansabombwe and Mansa.

Zambia's largest tea plantation is situated 27 km from Kawambwa on the Mporokoso road.

A camp for refugees of war in the eastern DR Congo was established by United Nations agencies at Kala 24 km north of Kawambwa in 1998, with a capacity for 40,000 refugees.

Near to Kawambwa are three of Zambia's waterfalls Lumangwe Falls, Kabwelume 50 km to the north-east on the Kalungwishi River and the Ntumbachushi Falls on the Ngona River, 16 km west.

== Climate ==
Kawambwa has a tropical savanna climate (Köppen: Aw) with clear wet and dry seasons.

Climate data for Kawambwa (1991–2020)
Month	Jan	Feb	Mar	Apr	May	Jun	Jul	Aug	Sep	Oct	Nov	Dec	Year
Record high °C (°F)	32.0 (89.6)	33.1 (91.6)	32.8 (91.0)	33.8 (92.8)	34.1 (93.4)	33.2 (91.8)	34.0 (93.2)	33.9 (93.0)	36.2 (97.2)	36.4 (97.5)	34.8 (94.6)	32.5 (90.5)	33.9 (93.0)
Mean daily maximum °C (°F)	27.4 (81.3)	28.0 (82.4)	27.8 (82.0)	28.8 (83.8)	28.9 (84.0)	27.8 (82.0)	27.6 (81.7)	29.6 (85.3)	30.6 (87.1)	31.3 (88.3)	28.8 (83.8)	27.5 (81.5)	28.7 (83.7)
Daily mean °C (°F)	22.2 (72.0)	22.6 (72.7)	22.5 (72.5)	22.6 (72.7)	21.5 (70.7)	19.6 (67.3)	19.3 (66.7)	21.4 (70.5)	23.3 (73.9)	24.3 (75.7)	22.8 (73.0)	22.2 (72.0)	22.0 (71.6)
Mean daily minimum °C (°F)	17.0 (62.6)	17.2 (63.0)	17.1 (62.8)	16.3 (61.3)	14.1 (57.4)	11.4 (52.5)	10.9 (51.6)	13.1 (55.6)	15.9 (60.6)	17.2 (63.0)	16.8 (62.2)	16.8 (62.2)	15.3 (59.5)
Record low °C (°F)	13.5 (56.3)	13.0 (55.4)	12.7 (54.9)	10.2 (50.4)	8.6 (47.5)	5.3 (41.5)	5.9 (42.6)	5.6 (42.1)	10.7 (51.3)	11.8 (53.2)	12.6 (54.7)	13.2 (55.8)	10.3 (50.5)
Average precipitation mm (inches)	235.9 (9.29)	185.3 (7.30)	249.6 (9.83)	110.6 (4.35)	17.1 (0.67)	0.4 (0.02)	0.0 (0.0)	1.3 (0.05)	12.8 (0.50)	74.2 (2.92)	153.5 (6.04)	216.7 (8.53)	1,257.4 (49.50)
Source: NOAA
