= Mansa Airport =

Airport in Zambia

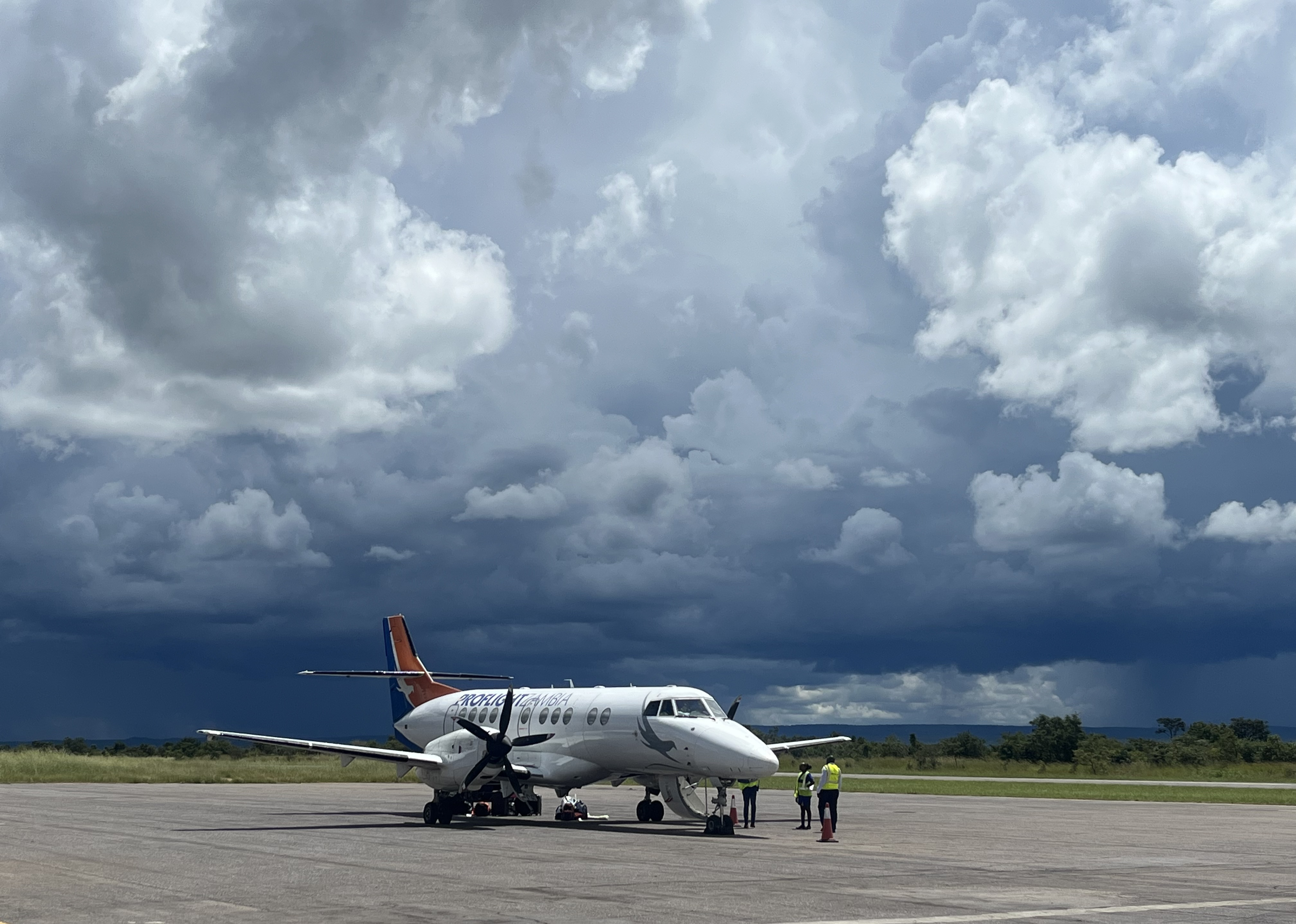
- IATA: MNS; ICAO: FLMA

Summary
- Airport type: Public
- Serves: Mansa, Zambia
- Elevation AMSL: 4,100 ft (1,200 m)
- Coordinates: 11°08′17″S 28°52′30″E

Map
- Location of the airport in Zambia

Runways
Direction	Length		Surface
Direction	m	ft	Surface
10/28	1,610	5,282	Asphalt (deteriorated)
- Sources: WAD GCM Google Maps

Mansa Airport (IATA: MNS, ICAO: FLMA) is an airport serving Mansa, a city in the Luapula Province in Zambia. The airport is 4 kilometres (2.5 mi) north of the city.

The Mansa non-directional beacon (Ident: MA) is located on the field.

== Airlines and destinations ==
Airlines	Destinations
Proflight Zambia	Lusaka, Ndola

== See also ==
- Transport in Zambia
- List of airports in Zambia
