= Kasama Airport =

Airport in Zambia

- IATA: KAA; ICAO: FLKS

Summary
- Airport type: Public
- Owner/Operator: Zambia Airports Corporation Limited
- Serves: Kasama
- Elevation AMSL: 4,542 ft / 1,384 m
- Coordinates: 10°13′00″S 31°08′00″E

Map
- Location of the airport in Zambia

Runways
Direction	Length		Surface
Direction	ft	m	Surface
13/31	9,586	2,800	Dirt
18/36	2,870	875	Grass
- Source: GCM Google Maps

Kasama Airport (IATA: KAA, ICAO: FLKS) is an airport serving Kasama, Northern Province, Zambia.

The Kasama non-directional beacon (ident: KS) is located at the eastern edge of the field.

== Airlines and destinations ==
Airlines	Destinations
Proflight Zambia	Lusaka

== See also ==
- List of airports in Zambia
- Transport in Zambia
