= Kabwelume Falls =

Waterfall in Zambia

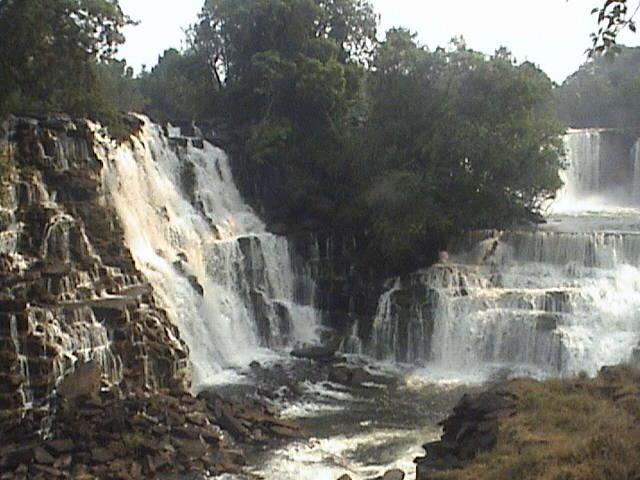
Kabwelume falls in the dry season

Kabwelume Falls is a waterfall on the Kalungwishi River in the Northern Province of Zambia. The falls is about 6 km down stream of Lumangwe Falls. When viewed at peak water volume (April/May), a month after the wet season, the falls makes a spectacular semi circle of falling water. There are plans to build a hydro power station on this falls.

== See also ==
- List of waterfalls
- List of waterfalls of Zambia
