= Kundalila Falls =

Waterfall in Zambia

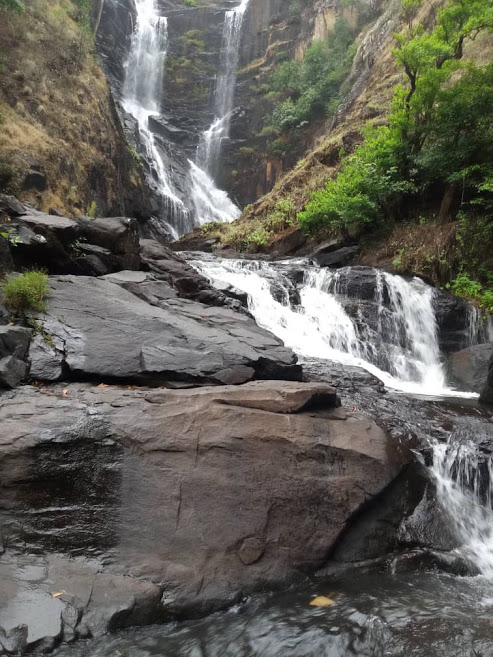
Kundalila Falls in dry season

Kundalila Falls is a waterfall on the Kaombe River in Zambia. It falls over the lip of the Muchinga escarpment and makes a waterfall near the small town of Kanona in the Serenje District. The name 'Kundalila Falls' means "crying dove" in the local Bemba language.

From top of the falls there are views over the Luangwa Valley which is part of the Albertine Rift, the western branch of the East African Rift. In multiple stages the Kaombe River drops approximately 80m from the escarpment. At the foot of the fall is a natural deep pool surrounded by wild flowers.

Kundalila Falls is one of the official Zambian Natural Monuments.
