= Kasama District =

- District
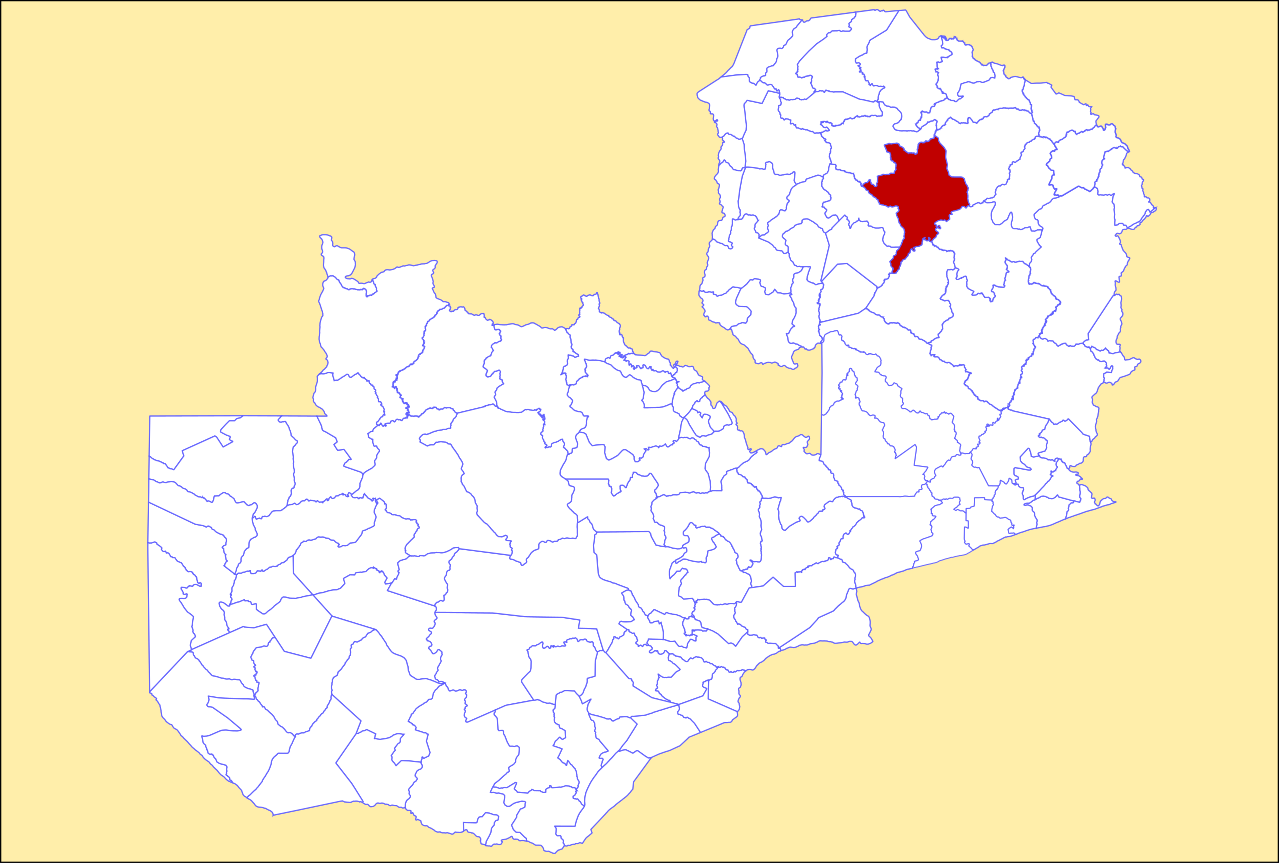
- District location in Zambia
- Coordinates: 10°10′S 31°15′E
- Country: Zambia
- Province: Northern Province
- Capital: Kasama

Area
  - Total: 10,584.1 km^{2} (4,086.5 sq mi)

Population (2022)
  - Total: 348,552
  - Density: 32.9317/km^{2} (85.2926/sq mi)
- Time zone: UTC+2 (CAT)

Kasama District is a district of Northern Province, Zambia. The district capital is Kasama. As of the 2022 Zambian Census, the district had a population of 348,552 people. It consists of two constituencies, namely Kasama Central and Lukashya.

== Towns and villages ==
- Achitende
