= Ntumbachushi Falls =

Waterfall in Zambia

Coordinates: 9°51′14″S 28°56′39″E

Ntumbachushi Falls (also spelled Ntumbacusi and Ntumbacushi) are situated on the Ngona River in Luapula Province, Zambia where it runs over the edge of the northern Zambian plateau into the valley of the Luapula River.

The main falls occur where the river splits into two channels to form two parallel waterfalls each about 10 m wide with a drop of about 30 m, and separated by a distance of 50 m. A small patch of relict rainforest grows in the spray from the falls. During and immediately after the rainy season, November to April, the water coming over the edge may have a depth of up to 1 m, but in the later dry season the flow may reduce to a produce a 'bridalveil' effect.

The falls are 22 km from Mbereshi on the tarred Kawambwa road and are reached via a 1 km spur which turns off at the bottom of the escarpment and approaches the bottom of the main falls. A steep path 20 m on the north side of the main falls leads up and over the rocky cliff and continues for 0.5 km to a place nicknamed 'the beauty spot' consisting of two pools below a falls of about 6 m high and 25 m wide in two sections. Above the main falls there are two further falls with a drop exceeding 5 m.

There are two shrines close to the main falls where local traditional leaders and healers perform rituals.

Images of Ntumbachushi Falls
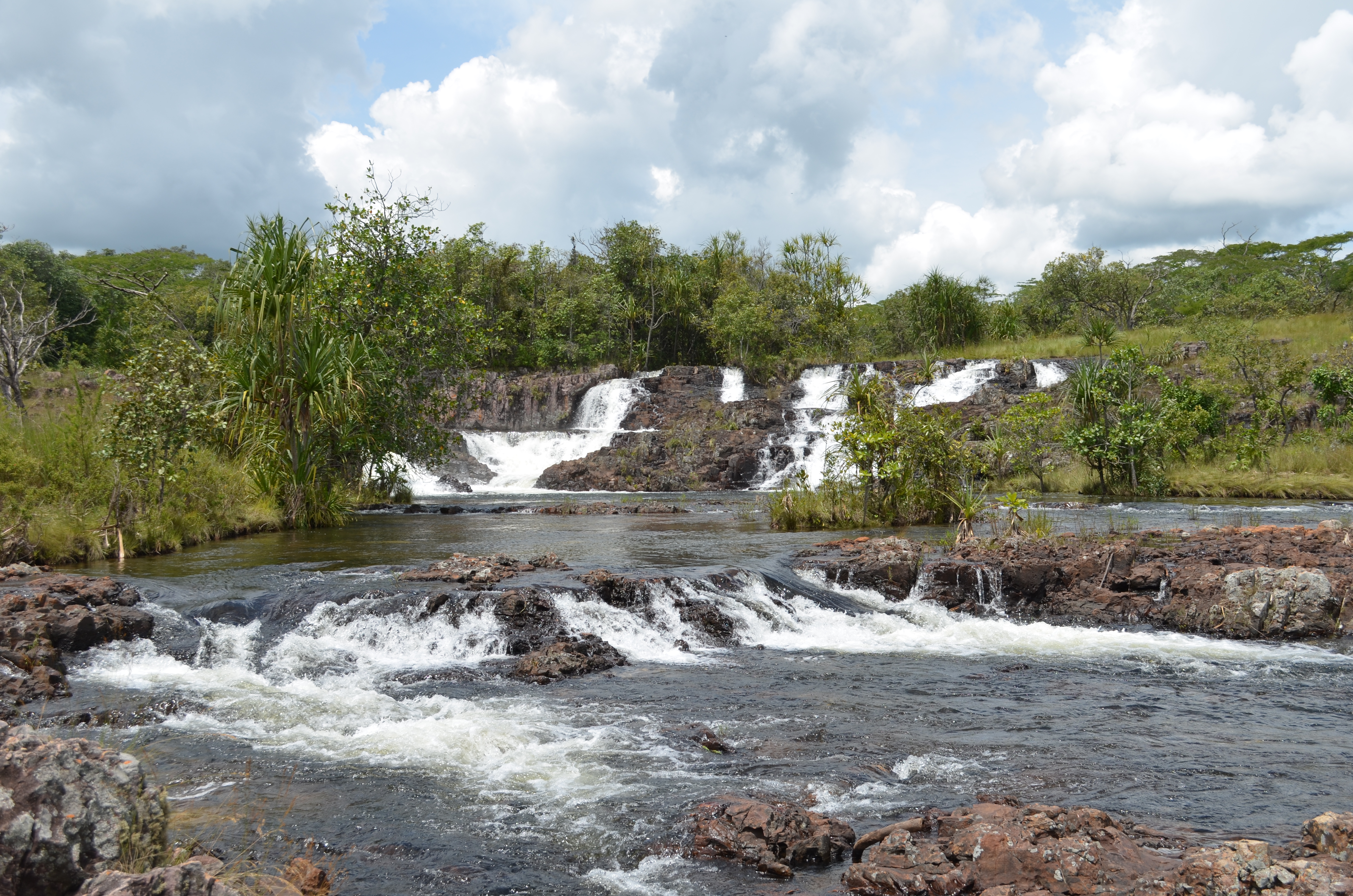
Rapids above Ntumbachushi Falls

== See also ==
- List of waterfalls
- List of waterfalls of Zambia
