= Lumangwe Falls =

Waterfall in Zambia

Coordinates: 9°32′S 29°23′E

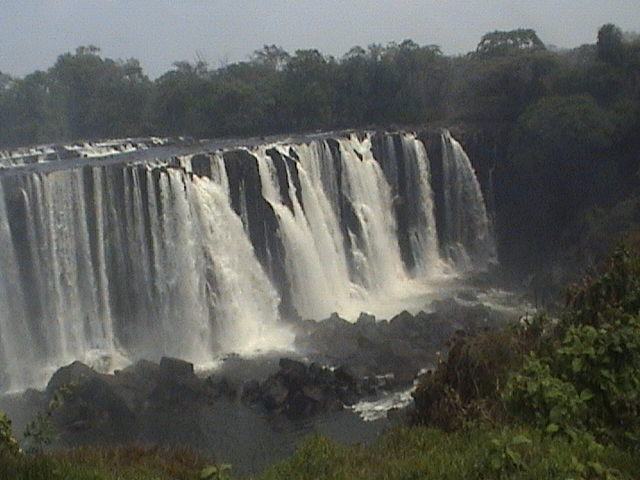
Lumangwe falls on the Kalungwishi River during the dry season (September–October)

Lumangwe Falls on the Kalungwishi River in northern Zambia is the largest waterfall wholly within the country, with a height of 30–40 m and a width of 100–160 m. It is a block-type waterfall located between the Luapula and Northern Provinces. The main bedrock is interbedded quartzite with layers of red siltstone.

The falls are 80 km from Mporokoso on the Kawambwa road. It has a similar depth of water falling over the edge to the Victoria Falls (Mosi-oa-Tunya) on the Zambezi for which it is frequently mistaken in photographs. Lumangwe Falls forms part of the Lumangwe Falls / Kabwelume Falls / Chimpepe Falls Complex, a national monument in Zambia.

At the river's height at the end of the rainy season in April / May, spray from the waterfall may be carried 100 m into the air and the roaring sound in the gorge below seems to shake the ground.

Lumangwe Falls are reached via a 10 km earth road which turns west from the Kawambwa-Mporokoso gravel road, 2.5 km north-east of the Kalungwishi bridge at Chipempe, which replaced the pontoon (Kalungwishi Ferry) in 2004. The falls can be viewed from the bank of the river at the top and from a cliff almost opposite the drop. Paths lead to the foot of the falls and also down the gorge to Kabwelume Falls 6 km downstream.

The falls have not seen the same level of tourism as the more well-known Victoria Falls. A council planning officer reported to the Zambia Daily Mail that this was because the area was previously sacred to chiefs in the district who would pay homage to their ancestors, and the area was avoided by the common people. Attempts to open the Lumangwe Falls area began in 1975, but were unsuccessful until 1996. This was attributed to the chiefs agreeing to move the ancestral spirits to a different location. The name of the falls comes from a snake spirit, Lumangwe, which is said to have stretched itself between the Lumangwe falls and the Kabwelume Falls, a distance of roughly 5 km.

== Ecology ==
Slightly downstream from Lumangwe Falls is the only known location of the flower Zygotritonia atropurpurea, identified by Peter Goldblatt et al. in 2019.

== See also ==
- List of waterfalls
- List of waterfalls of Zambia
