= Nsama District =

Coordinates: 8°45′S 29°58′E

- District
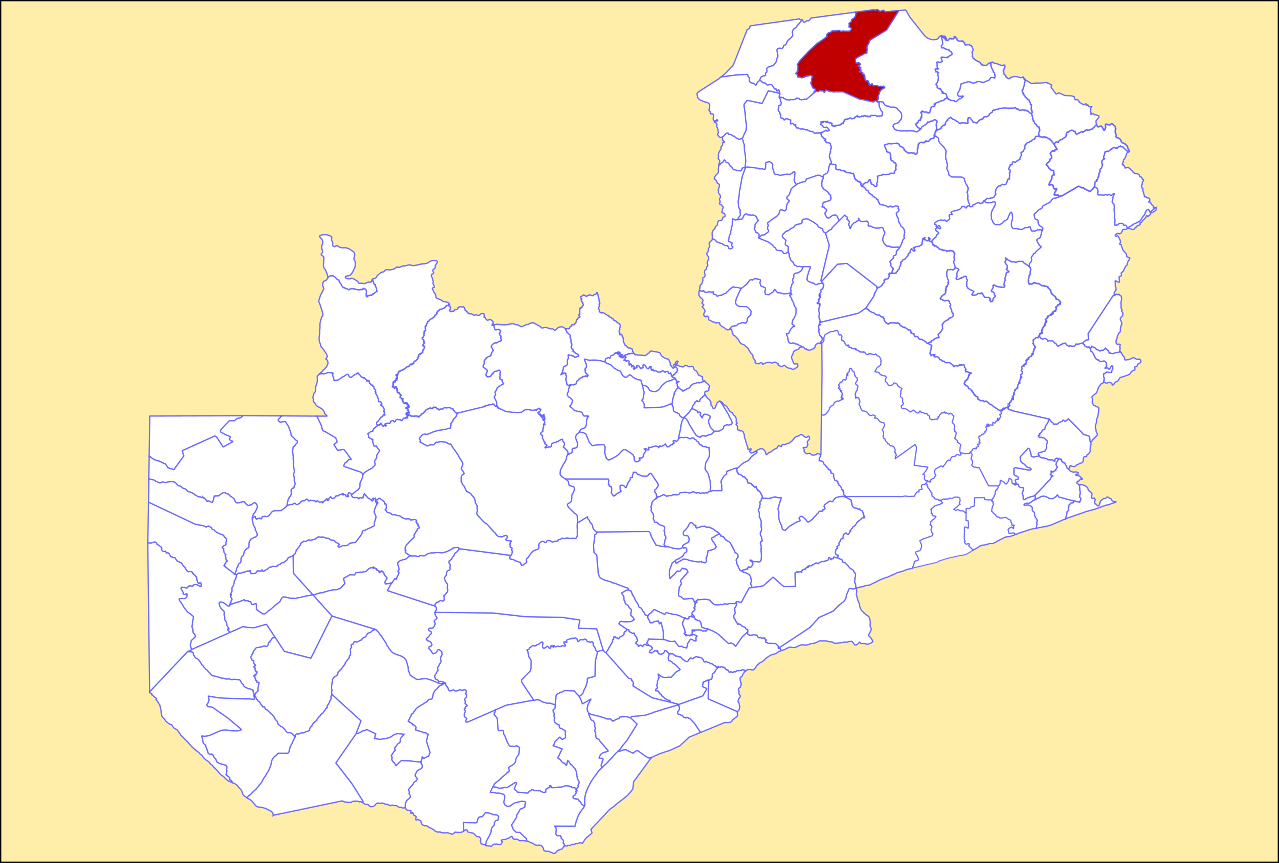
- District location in Zambia
- Country: Zambia
- Province: Northern Province
- District headquarters: Nsama

Area
  - Total: 7,492.9 km^{2} (2,893.0 sq mi)

Population (2022)
  - Total: 77,651
  - Density: 10.363/km^{2} (26.841/sq mi)
- Time zone: UTC+2 (CAT)

Nsama District is a district of Northern Province, Zambia. It was created in February 2012 by splitting Kaputa District. As of the 2022 Zambian Census, the district had a population of 77,651 people.

== Geography ==
The District Council headquarters is at Nsama town. The district stretches from the Zambia–Democratic Republic of the Congo (DRC) border and Lake Tanganyika in the north and northeast, to Kaputa District and Lake Mweru Wantipa in the northwest, to Mporokoso District in the south, and Mpulungu District in the southeast. The upper Lufubu River forms part of its southeastern boundary and its southern boundary is roughly along the Muchinga escarpment. Via Lake Tanganyika and the small port at Nsumbu there is international access by boat to eastern DRC, Burundi and Tanzania, as well as to Zambia's main lake port of Mpulungu.

== History of Nsama District ==
In the 1860s, Lake Tanganika was controlled by Swahili-speaking Arabs from Zanzibar, whose sailing boats roamed the lake, including Nsumbu Bay, and who traded in ivory and slaves, exchanging them for cloth and weapons. Tippu Tip was one especially active in the hinterland of the bay in present day Nsama, Kaputa and Mpulungu Districts. He sent columns of people, often up to 2000-strong, via Ujiji back to Zanzibar with slaves and ivory, which he exchanged for cloth, guns and gunpowder.

In 1867 Scottish missionary-explorer David Livingstone travelled though the future Mpulungu and Nsama districts from the southern tip of Lake Tanganyika to the northern shore of Lake Mweru Wantipa, on his way to Lake Mweru. He reported that Tippu Tip was involved in a war in that area against Chief Nsama of the Tabwa people, and later, that Tippu Tip's guns were victorious against Nsama’s bows and arrows. Livingstone met both leaders in their separate villages and recorded how the so-called 'coastal traders' thereby established control of the whole area. Nsama and Kaputa districts became the southernmost extent of Tippu Tip’s state which by the 1870s extended north along the western bank of Lake Tanganyika, and continued northwards as far as the Ituri Forest. Some of Tippu Tip’s fellow Zanzibari traders settled in Nsumbu, and in villages near Nsama town, establishing long-lasting spheres of Arabic and Muslim influence. One of them, Abdullah ibn Suliman (or Abdullah bin Suleiman) gave his name to his village, and to a mosque which survives today in Kamwendo, about 4 km from Nsama town. Suleiman was also called Semiwe.

Colonial rule came to the area when the British South Africa Company sent Alfred Sharpe from the British Central Africa Protectorate (now Malawi) to establish treaties with chiefs in the area between Lakes Mweru and Tanganyika, as well as west of Lake Mweru in Garanganze. Sharpe was successful with Chief Kazembe and Chief Nsama Mukula who signed his treaties in November 1892 in return for British protection against coastal traders, particularly Abdullah ibn Suliman. The British aims were to end the slave trade and to replace the Arabs as traders. To support the treaties, Sharpe and the BSAC established bomas in locations adjacent to Nsama district at Chiengi (1891), Abercorn (Mbala) 1893, Kalungwishi on the river of that name near Mununga (mid 1890s), and Mporokoso (1899-90). The coastal traders gradually ceased trading in slaves as a result, but continued dealing in ivory, cloth and copper for decades.

Mporokoso was established as the district covering the plateau surrounding the town, Lake Mweru Wantipa and the land up to the Congo border and east to Lake Tanganyika. Nsama District was part of it until excised as part of Kaputa District in 1985, and was excised from that to form its own District in 2012.

== Climate ==
The district experiences a tropical climate with distinct weather patterns throughout the year. The hot-wet season occurs between November and April, followed by the cool-dry season from May to July, and the dry-hot season from August to October. Annual rainfall averages around 1,200 mm, with temperatures averaging 19.65°C.

== See also ==
- Nsumbu National Park
- Kaputa District
