= Mutuke, Zambia =

- Village
- Location in Zambia
- Coordinates: 9°47′00″S 31°33′00″E
- Country: Zambia
- Province: Northern Province
- Districts of Zambia: Mungwi District
- Village: Mutuke
- Time zone: UTC+2 (CAT)

Mutuke is a hamlet and river in the Mungwi District of Northern Province, Zambia.

== Background and history ==
Mutuke Hamlet is situated west of the Mutuke, a stone throw from the river bank. It has one large homestead and an arable plot to its west. As ancient immigrants left trails of sojourning evidence, it is thought this place in Zambia was named after one of the Bantu immigrant clans many centuries ago as they drifted further south in search for better agricultural land.

Currently, this place is remotely inhabited by one large homestead dwellers. The rest of the land is flora and small fauna.

== Operations ==
The only significance of Mutuke as a geographical place name is the possible link it has with Mutuke Village of Nigeria. Today Mutuke is not a common name in the Sub-Equatorial Africa but the Mutuke Clan in Zimbabwe could only assume Mutuke of Zambia is primary evidence supporting their oral history as having their origins in and around what is Nigeria today. The surname is most prevalent in Zimbabwe

== Mutuke River ==
Mutuke is a body of running water and a tributary of the Chambeshi River.

== See also ==
MutukeMaternityClinic
