= Nsumbu National Park =

National park in Zambia

- Sumbu
- IUCN category II (national park)
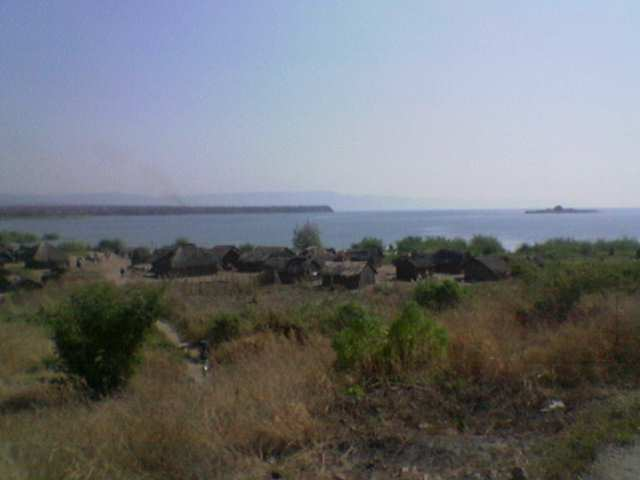

- Location within Zambia
- Nearest city: Nsumbu
- Coordinates: 8.74394°S 30.38269°E
- Area: 2,026.0 km^{2} (782.2 sq mi)
- Designation: National Park
- Designated: 1985
- Governing body: Department of National Parks and Wildlife

Nsumbu National Park (also called Sumbu) lies on the southwestern shore of Lake Tanganyika near its southern extremity, in Zambia's Northern Province, with its north and west in Nsama District, and its east and south in Mpulungu District. It is part of Zambia's Mweru Wantipa‒Tanganyika ecological region stretching 150 km from Lake Tanganyika to the hills northeast of Lake Mweru, protected by a series of national parks, game reserves and game management areas. Created as a game reserve in the 1940s as recognition of its rich wildlife, and made a National Park in 1985, Nsumbu NP has been relatively isolated, initially accessible only by boat from Mpulungu. It was considered to be, with South Luangwa and Kafue, one of the best wildlife reserves in the country, with elephants and lions being common.

Nsumbu National Park experienced a decline in wildlife populations, facilities and visitor numbers, beginning in the 1980's and continuing in the next two decades. This was exacerbated by conflict in the neighbouring Congo territory which boosted poaching. With Zambia's improved economy in more recent decades and a revitalised tourism sector, new conservation and management programmes have been introduced in the Park and the rebuilding of visitor facilities is planned.

Nsumbu is the only National Park in Zambia that offers a natural lake environment, (Note: Mweru Wantipa NP is also on a lake but has no facilities or tourism.) adding sandy beaches, clear water and lakeshore landscapes, as well as angling, and safaris by boat, to its attractions.

== Geography ==
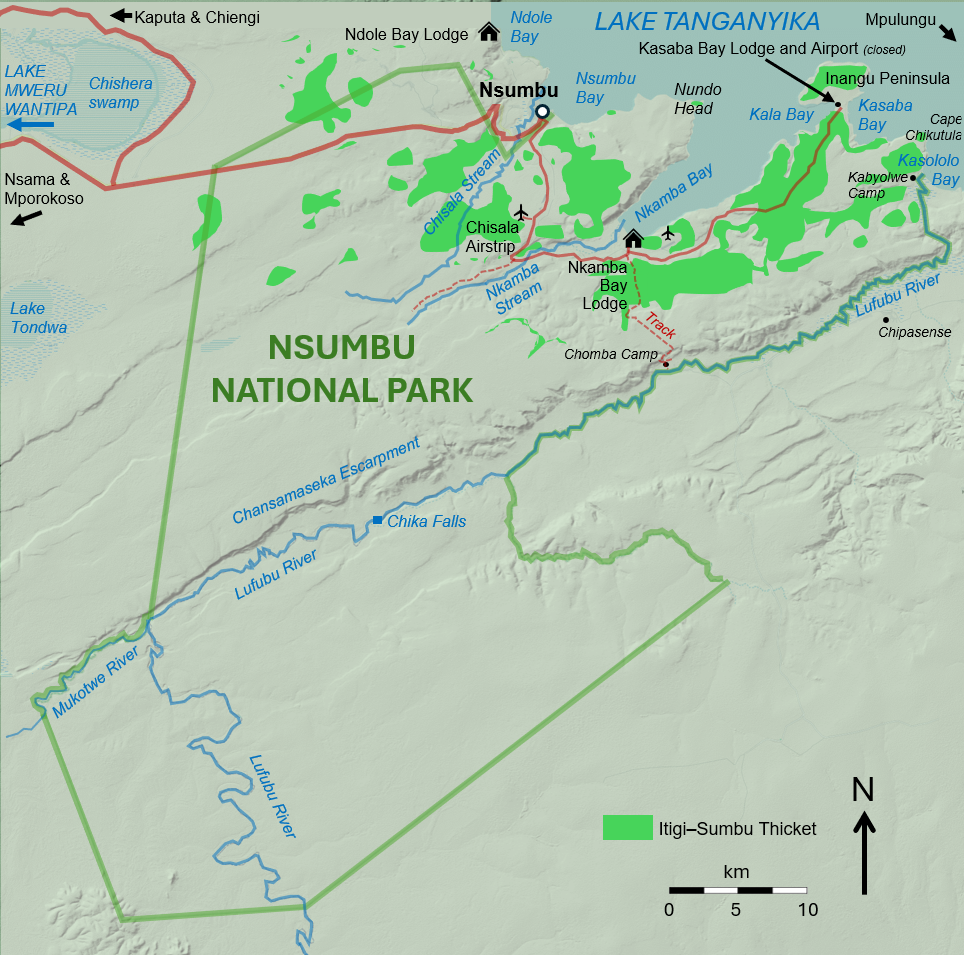
Nsumbu National Park Zambia showing park boundary and main features

Nsumbu National Park covers about 2000 km^{2} of plateau at an average elevation of about 1000 m on the margin of the Lake Tanganyika Rift Valley, with (in the most-visited northeast portion of the Park) lakeshore escarpments, rocky headlands, sandy bays, and incised river valleys. To the west in complete contrast, flatter woodland with extensive wetlands stretches to Lake Mweru Wantipa, with its own National Park noted for birdlife, crocodiles and hippopotamus.

Running west-south-west to east-north-east across most of the north and centre of Nsumbu National Park are three river valleys ending at bays at the lake, with two ridges in between forming headlands at the lake. The elevation of the lake surface is 776 m and the ridges are about 250 m higher. The highest point in the park, about 1300 m, is on the Chansamasanka Escarpment above the Lufubu Valley.

In the south of the park, towards the margin of the Mporokoso plateau, streams and rivers have dissected shallow valleys into a pattern of dendritic drainage with low rounded hills between.

=== Lake Tanganyika shore ===
Nsumbu National Park has 80–100 km of lake shore (depending on scale of measurement) in the northeast, including five sandy bays and three main rocky headlands. From west to east the bays in the park are: the eastern half of Sumbu; Nkamba; Kala; Kasaba; and the northern half of Kasololo. The headlands are Nundo Head, Inangu Peninsula and Cape Chikutula. South of Cape Chikutula in Kasololo Bay the Park's lake shore ends at the mouth of the Lufubu River, Zambia's major tributary to Lake Tanganika.

The land generally rises 100–200 m above the lake within a kilometre of the shore, except that the heads of bays are lower, extending inland some distance with only a few metres’ elevation above the lake surface.

The Park includes a zone of the lake extending 1.6 km from the shore, amounting to about 100 km^{2} of lake surface. Commercial fishing is not permitted in this zone and recreational fishing requires a licence.

The Inangu peninsula is its own Game Management Area and is technically not part of the Park but is managed as part of it.

Game viewing by boat is particularly rewarding at Nsumbu National Park.

=== The Chisala valley and Nsumbu Bay ===
The Chisala Stream flows NE across the northern part of the park, from wetlands east of Lake Tondwa into Nsumbu town and discharges at the town's northern edge into Nsumbu Bay. It forms a broad shallow valley, more prominent to the east, with wetlands in its upper reaches, and at its mouth.

=== The Nkamba valley and Bay ===
The Nkamba Stream, also known as the Chitatu, is formed from several streams running north down the dip slope of the Chansamasaka escarpment. It flows ENE in a deeper valley than the Chisala, which opens out to an alluvial plain, altogether about 10 km long, at the head of Nkamba Bay. The Bay itself, 14 km long and 2.5–6 km wide with steep sides formed by the two ridges which end at Nundo Head and Inangu Peninsula/Cape Chikutula, is the extension of the same valley carved out in earlier times and now submerged.

The alluvial plain supports about 10 m2 of grassland and wetlands, the largest such area in the northeast of the park, and together with wetlands, riparian woodland, and forested slopes, makes the bay and valley one of the park's prime game viewing areas and a destination for game drives and walking safaris.

=== The Lufubu River Valley and southern portion of the Park ===
The Lufubu River valley, which is contiguous in the west with the Mukotwe River valley, runs WSW to ENE across the whole park. An escarpment along its northern bank rises up to 300 m above the river, making it the most prominent valley and ridge in the park, running across its full width. In the west, where for about 30 km it includes a vertical cliff, it is called Chansamaseka Escarpment.

Apart from in a 200-m deep gorge 5 km from its mouth, the main river channel, about 50 m wide, meanders through extensive wetlands in its last 20 km, with a floodplain up to 2 km wide. Here the river is the park boundary, and on the other side, the southern escarpment of the valley is up to 10 km away, leaving a flat valley floor which supports several villages, accessed by a dirt road from the south.

Going WSW, the park boundary crosses the Lufubu at a tributary and runs south, so that part of the middle and upper sections of the river flow wholly within the Park. The middle Lufubu River above Chika Falls has a different aquatic fauna, and before the upper Lufubu flows into the main valley from the south, it has whitewater sections in a narrow steep-sided winding valley.

=== The western side of the Park ===
On its western side the park is bounded by the Kaputa Game Management Area and Tondwe Game reserve. The relatively flat western area of the park does not drain well and supports numerous small wetlands.

=== The northern side of the Park ===
The northern land boundary of the Park lies about 5 km north of the Nsumbu—Mporokoso road and there has been some encroachment into the Park from villages and fields on that side.

== Ecological zones in the Park ==
- The largest zone in the Park is Central Zambesian miombo woodland. The dominant vegetation is Brachystegia, Julbernardia and Isoberlinia trees with grasses and shrubs in the understory, supporting a very diverse fauna, including large mammals. As the annual rainfall in the area is above 1000 mm, it is the wet type of miombo. The woodland is interspersed with dambos, which are seasonally waterlogged grassy wetlands, dominated by grasses, rushes and sedges, retaining moisture along drainage lines through the dry season.
- Itigi–Sumbu thicket, considered to be of high conservation significance because it is a rare and geographically restricted vegetation type, occurring only in Nsumbu NP, on the northern shore of Lake Mweru Wantipa, and at one location in Tanzania. It comprises deciduous trees with shrubs and woody climbers forming a dense understory that can be locally impenetrable, although elephants readily move through it. The thicket provides cover for duikers and other small antelope. Once cleared, it does not regenerate.
- Lake Tanganyika aquatic habitats, including inundated shoreline vegetation. The lake level is variable and has risen by 2 m since 2018, submerging vegetation close to the water's edge particularly in the low-lying parts of the bays, and parts of the lower Lufubu River Valley.
- Lake Tanganyika shoreline habitats: sandy and stony beaches, cliffs, and rocky shores.
- Wetlands, including rivers, riparian habitats, dambos, swamps, floodplains, lagoons, and seasonal stream beds. Some wetlands may dry out to grassland in the dry season.
- Steep rocky escarpments above the Lufubu River.

== Fauna ==
=== Mammals ===
Nile crocodile, hippopotamus, bushbuck, warthog, puku, roan antelope, sable antelope, eland, hartebeest, African buffalo, plains zebra, spotted hyena, side-striped jackal, serval, impala, waterbuck, reedbuck, bush elephant, leopard (occasionally), blue duiker (rare), sitatunga (rare).

Lions became extinct in the park but were reintroduced in 2024.

=== Birds ===
Flamingo, African skimmer, spoonbill, whiskered tern, stork, duck, heron, gray-headed gull, lesser black-backed gull, white-winged black tern, fish eagle, palm-nut vulture (occasionally), Pel's fishing owl (occasionally)

=== Fish ===
Nile perch, goliath tigerfish, vundu catfish, lake salmon, yellow belly or 'nkupi', golden perch (occasionally)

== Wildlife conservation developments ==
In 2015 the Zambian Wildlife Authority reverted to its previous name, Department of National Parks and Wildlife (DNPW), in the Ministry of Tourism. A number of initiatives in the enforcement of wildlife protection (anti-poaching measures) and wildlife management have followed. For example, in 2019 a total of 148 community scouts were successfully trained in 90 day basic paramilitary training and wildlife management courses at the Chunga training school in the Kafue National Park.

The Nsumbu Tanganyika Conservation Project (NTCP), a partnership between the DPNW and the Frankfurt Zoological Society was started in 2017, managed by Craig Zytkow. It is credited with starting a turnaround in the Park's wildlife. It started with ranger training, surveillance, and intelligence networks. Thousands of wire snares (traps used in the bushmeat trade) were removed. Dozens of poachers were arrested. Patrols expanded into remote corners of the park where wildlife had once thrived. After securing the park, the NTCP moved to reintroduction to the park of species that had been lost.

Among the NTCP's programmes and achievements:

- No elephants have been poached in the park and adjacent protected areas since 2018.
- 200 Buffalo and 48 zebra were relocated to the Park in 2021.
- Lions were reintroduced to the Park.
- The Tanganyika Boat Unit was formed to provide support for conservation along the lake shore and Lufubu River.

== Park facilities ==
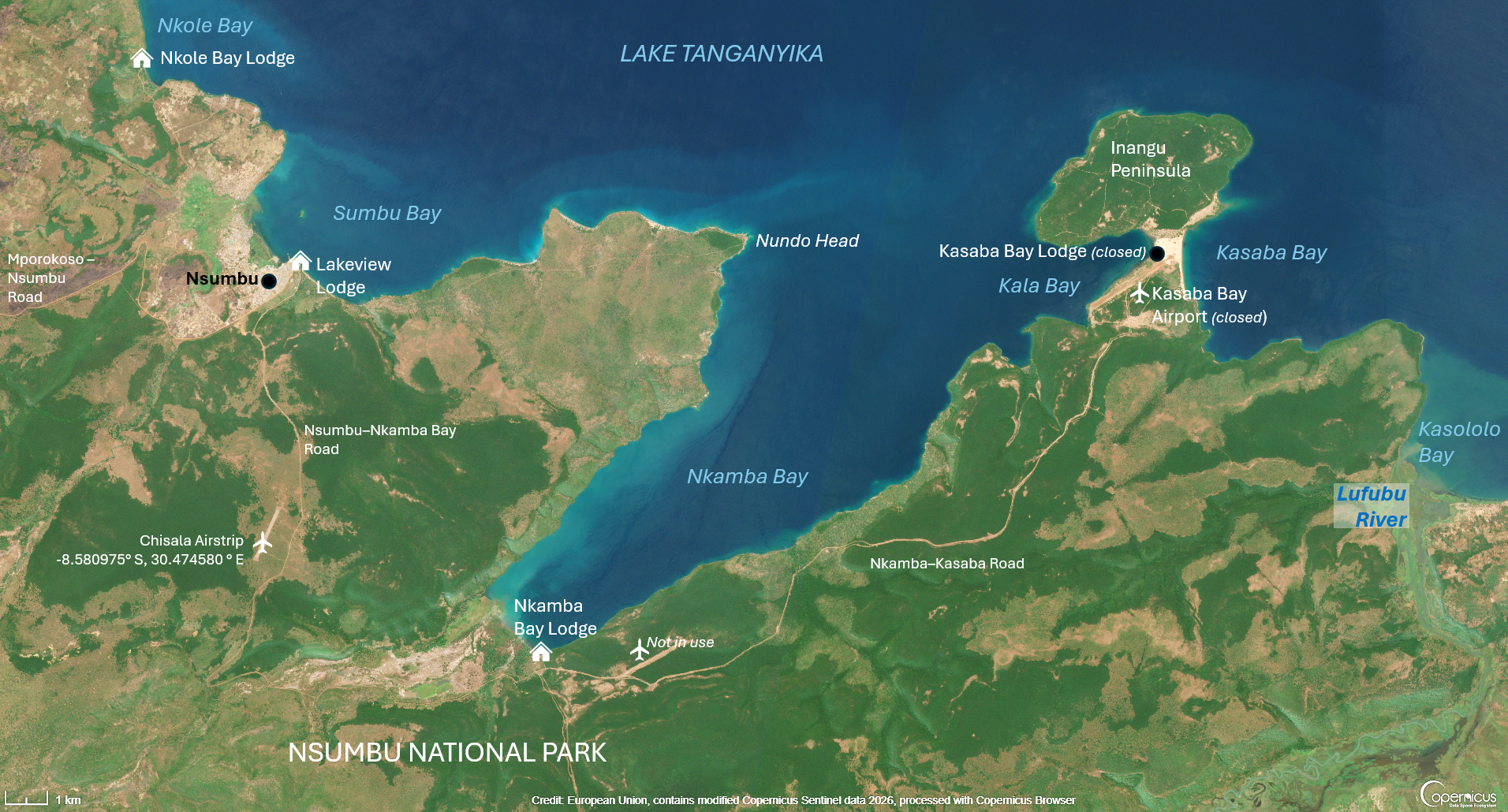
Satellite image-based map of the northeast corner of Nsumbu National Park, May 2026.

=== Access ===
==== By road ====
Apart from some 4WD bush tracks, the only road access to the Park is the 170-km Mporokoso–Nsama–Nsumbu gravel road.

==== By boat ====
Scheduled lake transport services operate from Mpulungu Harbour and call at Nsumbu town jetty. Some lodges, boat charters and tour companies operate boat transfers from Mpulungu as well. Boat safaris can also be organised from the lodges and may be available at Nsumbu jetty.

==== Air transport ====
The nearest airport to Nsumbu receiving scheduled flights is Kasama Airport, 209 km south of Mpulungu on a tarred road.

Air charters and private planes operate to Chisala Airstrip which has a 1.2 km gravel runway and is used by government and private air services including private tour companies (no scheduled flights). Nkamba Bay Lodge also has a dirt airstrip.

Note that Kasaba Bay Airport and Kasaba Bay Lodge are closed awaiting redevelopment.

==== Park headquarters and entrance gate ====
The Park headquarters and entrance gate are in a DNPW compound next to the jetty in Nsumbu town. Armed wildlife scouts are available there to accompany visitors on game drives and walking and boating safaris within the park (vehicles and boats not provided).· These can also be arranged through the accommodation lodges and private tour companies.

The DNPW compound also includes the Nsumbu Tanganyika Conservation Programme office and the Tanganyika Boat Unit jetty and boathouse.

=== Accommodation ===
- Nkamba Bay Lodge, a resort hotel with its own 1 km dirt airstrip and boat jetty, is the only accommodation within the Park (June 2026).
- Several commercial lodges are in Nsumbu town.
- Ndole Bay Lodge – private beachside resort hotel 8 km north of the Park offering safaris within the park by vehicle and boat; transfers to the lodge are available from Chisala Airstrip and by boat from Mpulungu.
- Lake Tanganyika Resort Mpulungu – private resort hotel 4 hours from the Park by boat.

In the past, there were remote bush camps on the banks of the Lufubu River at Kabyolwe and Chomba (dry season access via 4WD tracks), but their recent status is not known. Kabyolwe in the mouth of the river is accessible by boat but Chomba is not, due to rapids.

The annual Tanganyika Angling Challenge, formerly the Zambian National Fishing Competition, was started at Kasaba Bay in 1972 and continues to be held annually in the Park or vicinity.

== History of the Park ==
In early September 1867 the Scottish missionary explorer David Livingstone passed through what is now the southern part of the Park. He went first in a westerly direction from the plateau above the southwestern side of Lake Tanganyika and crossed the upper Lufubu. After visiting Chief Nsama in his then stockade, near the present Nsama town, he proceeded northwards towards the Chishera swamp at the eastern end of Lake Mweru Wantipa. In his journal he noted the prevalence of large game animals and mentions in particular elephant, buffalo, eland, hippotamus and zebra.

Livingstone's travels inspired both British missionaries of the London Missionary Society (LMS) and colonialists of the British South Africa Company (BSAC) to come to the Nsumbu area in the next few decades. In 1883 a site on the opposite bank of the Lufubu from the Park, about 6 km upstream from the lake, was chosen by LMS missionaries Edward Hore and Alfred Swann as a temporary shipyard to assemble the SS Good News, a steamship to ferry preachers around the lake, launched in 1885.

In the first years of its existence as a Game Reserve, in the 1950s, Nsumbu could only be reached by boat (the same applied to the town). Visitors came by motorboat from Mpulungu, and camped on the shore or stayed on their boat.

=== Kasaba Bay ===
In the 1950s Kasaba Game Camp was established, the forerunner of the Lodge. After a few years it included a main building comprising a dining room, lounge and bar built under a Winterthorn tree, overlooking the lake, towards the setting sun. This, with wild elephants wandering through the grounds, became the iconic Kasaba Bay image, although the buildings actually overlook Kala Bay. The larger Kasaba Bay, with its mile-long (1.6 km) sandy beach, is 700 m to the east, over a sand dune.

At first the only boat jetty was in front of the main building in Kala Bay, but from Mpulungu this makes the boat trip 12 km longer (taking about an hour). Therefore, another jetty was built in Kasaba Bay and tourists would be offloaded and met by an armed game guard, as there were no fences, and wild animals were plentiful, to walk 700 m to their rooms. Armed scouts would also accompany guests to the beach to swim, keeping an eye out for crocodiles and hippos, and it was claimed that the swimming was safe as a result.

By the early 1960s Central African Airways (forerunner of Zambia Airways) started offering package deals to Kasaba Bay from the Copperbelt, Lusaka, and even further away, flying in to Kasama or Mbala Airports, then transferring by road to Mpulungu Port, with the boat fare and accommodation at the Game Camp/Lodge included in the price.

An all weather dirt road did not reach Nsumbu town until 1958, being built from Nsama and Mporokoso. This opened up the cheaper option of visitors driving to Nsumbu and taking a boat from there to Kasaba Bay. Mporokoso District Council built government rest house chalets on the small headland next to the jetty, overlooking the lake. However, there were still no roads into the Park, so game viewing was conducted by boat, often with armed game guards to enable walking safaris to be conducted from suitable landing points, such as in Nkamba Bay.

A dirt airstrip was cleared at Kasaba Bay in the 1960s and was used initially by small private and charter aircraft, but a lack of roads within the park meant tourists who flew had to stay in Kasaba Bay or take a boat. In the late sixties a dirt road was constructed in the park from Nsumbu via Nkamba to Kasaba Bay, though at times it requires a 4WD vehicle.

The Nkamba Bay Lodge was constructed shortly after by the Ministry of Tourism facility, also with a jetty and small beach, and was later privatised. When Kasaba Bay Airport was closed for redevelopment in 2006, a dirt airstrip was constructed at Nkamba Bay Lodge.

==== President Kaunda and Kasaba Bay ====
Zambia's first president Dr Kenneth Kaunda took an interest in the park and with his support, in the 1960s, the Kasaba Bay Airport runway surface was sealed, and Zambia Airways scheduled three flights a week from Ndola by HS748. Kaunda took holidays there and had a Presidential Lodge built at the water's edge as part of the resort. He also had a 9-hole golf course established, and hosted a golf competition. It was also said he would retreat there to mull over political decisions, as well as hosting cabinet and foreign diplomatic meetings. On 19 October 1986 he hosted former President of Zaire Mobutu Sese Seko and Mozambique's President Samora Machel at Kasaba Bay to discuss prospects for peace in the Mozambican Civil War and it was on his way home after that meeting that President Machel died in a plane crash in South Africa.

=== Decline of the Park and Kasaba Bay Lodge ===
Zambia's economic and financial downturn in the 1980s resulted in a lack of funds for conservation management and anti-poaching measures, as well as for Park infrastructure and staff. Zambia Airways’ financial woes led to the scheduled services to Kasaba Bay being discontinued. The austerity and privatisation era of the 1990s did not yield quick results and, after President Kaunda left office in 1991, Nsumbu National Park became neglected. Its remoteness by road and proximity to war and conflict in the DR Congo, the land border of which is only 25 km to the north, deterred visitors.

By 2009 Kasaba Bay Lodge and the airport were closed pending plans for development.

=== Redevelopment proposals for Kasaba Bay Lodge and Airport ===
Plans were announced in 2020 for a new resort development to demolish and completely replace the existing Lodge. In 2022 there were news reports proposing instead that its historic nature be memorialised by its addition to the National Monuments list, and it should be preserved, even though the Presidential Lodge built by Kaunda was flooded by the 2 m rise in the level of the lake since 2018.

In 2024 it was reported that the new resort development proposal had been dropped.

Construction of a new airport had gone as far as laying down gravel foundation of the new runway on top of the asphalt runway but this halted. In 2025 they again announced that a new airport would be built.

== Proposal for hydroelectric power plants in the Park ==
The Lufubu Power Company has proposed building a cascade of three hydropower plants for a total generating capacity of 326 MW from a hydraulic head of 315 m on the Lufubu River in the Park. Each plant would comprise a dam and power station with high voltage power lines. The three plants would be:

1. On the upper river entirely within the park
2. On the middle section of the river near Chika Falls, also entirely within the park.
3. On the lower river before Chomba, where the river is the park boundary.

Construction would require roads to be built into the park probably from the south. As of June 2026 no plans or schedule have been announced.

=== See also ===
- Wildlife of Zambia
- Nsumbu Tanganyika Conservation Programme
