= Chief Mporokoso =

Zambian traditional ruler

Chief Mporokoso (also spelled 'Mpolokoso' and 'Mumpolokoso') is a senior chieftainship of the Bemba people of Zambia, and a subordinate chief of Paramount Chief Chitimukulu. The chief's palace is located in the Northern Province town of Mporokoso named after the chieftainship.
