= Mpulungu (constituency) =

Constituency of the National Assembly of Zambia

Mpulungu was a constituency of the National Assembly of Zambia. It covered the towns of Chasaya, Chisongo and Mpulungu in Mpulungu District of Northern Province.

== List of MPs ==
Election year	MP	Party
1968	Isaac Masaiti	United National Independence Party
1970 (by-election)	Israel Kasomo	United National Independence Party
1973	John Mwanakatwe	United National Independence Party
1978	Wind Mazimba	United National Independence Party
1983	John Chizu	United National Independence Party
1988	John Chizu	United National Independence Party
1991	Dean Mung'omba	Movement for Multi-Party Democracy
1994	Fredrick Nalili	United National Independence Party
1996	Griver Sikasote	Movement for Multi-Party Democracy
2001	Harrigan Mazimba	Movement for Multi-Party Democracy
2006	Lameck Chibombamilimo	Movement for Multi-Party Democracy
2010 (by-election)	Given Mung'omba	Movement for Multi-Party Democracy
2011	Chomba Sikazwe	Patriotic Front
2016	Chomba Sikazwe	Patriotic Front
2021	Leonard Mbao	United Party for National Development
Seat abolished (split into Mpulungu North and Mpulungu South)
