= Nashil Pichen Kazembe =

Zambian singer (1932–1991)

- Birth name: Nashil Pichen Kazembe
- Also known as: Nashil Pichen
- Born: 1932; Kaputa, Northern Province, Zambia
- Died: 1991
- Genres: Benga; twist; soukous; kwela
- Occupation: Singer
- Years active: 1970s – 1980s.

Nashil Pichen Kazembe (1932–1991) was a Zambian singer from Kaputa District in the Luapula Valley, who gained prominence in the 1970s. He spent a large part of his life in Nairobi, Kenya, where he collaborated with fellow Zambia emigre Peter Tsotsi and Benson Simbeye. As members of Eagles Lupopo Band they sang 'patriotic songs' praising President Kenneth Kaunda and commenting on various social issues.

== Biography ==
Nashil Pichen Kazembe was born in 1932 near the Congolese border, in Kaputa, Northern Province, Zambia, which was at the time a disputed part of the Luapula Province under the Northern Rhodesian government. He taught himself how to play banjos and then guitar in his childhood. In 1953, he went to work in the mines in South Africa, where he formed his first band, the Bantu Negroes, which disbanded when he returned to Zambia the following year to become a business executive. Kazembe also spent time in Congo, Uganda, and Kenya, the latter being where he settled in 1958.

His musical activities in Nairobi included numerous collaborations with fellow Zambian emigre Peter Tsotsi, as well as membership in collectives such as Daudi Kabaka's African Eagles (also known as Eagles Lupopo) band, and The Equator Sound Band. Peter Tsotsi Juma and Nashil Pichen helped develop the Equator Sound Band's "twist" style, modeled after the South African kwela rhythm.

Nashil Pichen ended his career as a solo artist after moving from Kenya to Lusaka. His big hit "A-Phiri Anabwera" was the first single to sell more than 50,000 units in Zambia. It was a song about Mr Phiri, a long-lost migrant worker who returns home from the city empty-handed, only to find that no one in his village remembers him. Pichen had earlier scored a string of hits with his Super Mazembe band singing in Zambian, Congolese and Kenyan. He worked with Mazembe as a producer and manager in Zambia, but he also came to have his own successful career as a solo artist in Kenya. It was in Kenya that he developed his style of combining Zambian traditional music with Congolese, Kenyan and Southern African urban rhythms like soukous, benga music and kwela. He returned to Zambia in the 1980s and recorded further albums there, and he was also very popular in Zimbabwe.

Kazembe died in 1991. Although he had a successful music career, at the time of his death he was a very poor man. He is survived by his daughter, Hadija Nawezi Pichen.

== Discography ==
=== Studio albums and compilations ===
1. A Phiri Anabwera
2. Hot Hits Of Nashil Pichen Kazembe
3. Nashil Pichen Kazembe & Super Mazembe

=== Selected singles & EPs ===
- "Munyadiranji"
- "Usaone Kumanga Thayo Pts 1 & 2"
- "Mwazima Nyale / Shanty Compound"
- "Kabolala Wa Chikondi"
- "Mungeli Ufwaya / Babili – Babili"

=== As a contributing artist ===
- Before Benga Vol. Two: The Nairobi Sound (1993)

== See also ==
- Music of Kenya
- Music of Zambia
- Benga music
