= Mporokoso District =

Coordinates: 9°40′S 30°10′E

- District
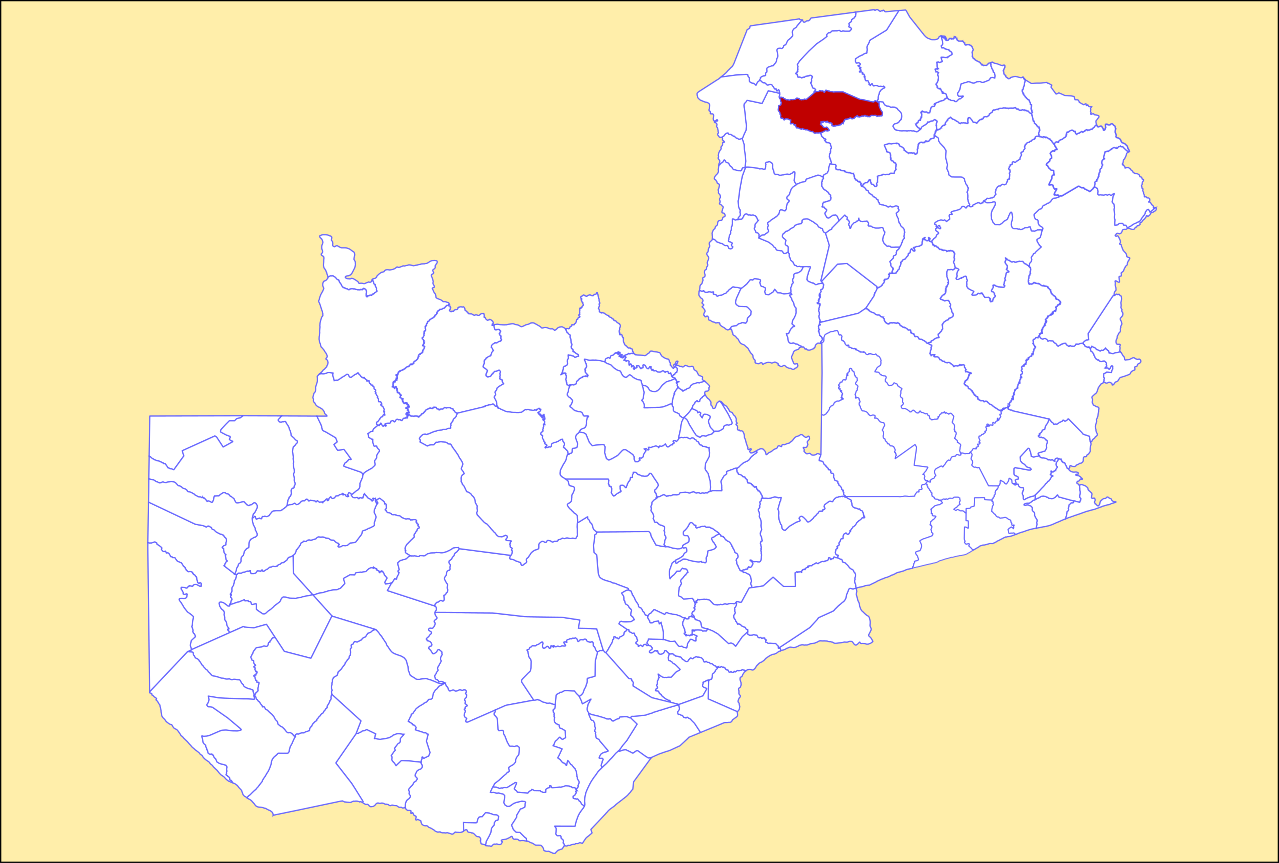
- District location in Zambia
- Country: Zambia
- Province: Northern Province
- Capital: Mporokoso

Area
  - Total: 4,196 km^{2} (1,620 sq mi)

Population (2022)
  - Total: 63,452
  - Density: 15.12/km^{2} (39.17/sq mi)
- Time zone: UTC+2 (CAT)

Mporokoso District is a district of Zambia, located in Northern Province. The capital lies at Mporokoso. As of the 2022 Zambian Census, the district had a population of 63,452 people.

== Geography ==
Mporokoso borders:

- North: Nsama District, Kaputa District, Mpulungu District
- South: Lunte District
- West: Kawambwa District

Mporokoso lies 178km west from the Province's capital (Kasama).
