= Lufubu River =

Physical characteristics
- Source
  - location: Near Kapatu, Northern Province
  - elevation: 1520 m
- Mouth
  - location: Kasololo Bay, Lake Tanganyika
  - elevation: 770 m
- Length: 250 km

The Lufubu River (also called the Lofu or Lovu) in the Northern Province of Zambia is the largest tributary entering the southern end of Lake Tanganyika. The river is a notable but under-exploited resource for Zambia's tourism and wildlife sectors, as well as those of Lake Tanganyika, dominating the environment and ecology of the southern part of Nsumbu National Park. Rapids just before its lower course isolate the upper river from the lake, producing a distinct fish fauna there.

== The course of the Lufubu ==
=== Upper river ===
The source of the Lufubu is on Zambia's northern plateau in miombo woodland intersected by dambos. The source is one of many streams which arise on the watershed that is followed by the Mporokoso–Senga Hill Road, a few kilometres north of Kapatu, at an elevation of 1520 m. These streams flow north into an extensive dambo and wetland system at 9°07′35″S 30°47′55″E, at an elevation of 1183 m, about 130 km north of Kasama (straight line distance). From this wetland system the main channel of the Lufubu flows west through many meanders, oxbow lakes and wetlands often more than 1 km wide. Near Mutapa at elevation 1165 m where the plateau slopes away, the river winds through gentle hills and valleys towards the north-northeast, forming extensive rapids at Chimanga Falls near Mushika, elevation 1141 m. Near this point the Lufubu enters the Nsumbu National Park, and continues in a narrow winding valley 70 m deep, with many rapids, until it meets the Chansamakasa escarpment and turns northeast. This is just after its confluence at elevation 991 m with its tributary the Mukotwe River flowing from the west-southwest.

Middle section

The Lufubu continues east-northeast with the escarpment close by on its northern bank, with a more distant escarpment on its southern bank. In this section of the river, the valley bottom is flat where the river meanders among wetlands with oxbow lakes, interspersed with faster flowing sections in winding gorges. In one of the latter is found Chika Falls (elevation 965 m).

Lower river

Before the river reaches Chombe, the portion of Nsumbu National Park south of the Lufubu ends, and from here to Lake Tanganyika, the southern bank of the lower river is populated with a few villages, while the north bank and escarpment is part of the National Park. The main channel, about 50 m wide, meanders through extensive wetlands in its last 20 km, falling about 10 m in elevation, with a floodplain up to 2 km wide.

In its last 6 km, north of Chipasense, the river turns north to flow through a gorge about 700 m wide and 200 m deep. It then opens out to form a mouth in Kasololo Bay of the lake (elevation 770 m), with wetlands 1.6 km wide including lagoons, between an eastern shore comprising a low stony and sandy bank where the fishing village Kabyolwe is situated, and a western bank where Kabyolwe Camp of the National Park is situated. This bank continues northwards, ending eventually at a wooded headland, Cape Chikutula, rising 100 m above the lake.

== History and settlements ==
The Lufubu flows through remote forested country with a low population density, and does not support much fishing or navigation except for the last 20–30 km of its course, which is accessible by boat from Lake Tanganyika and would be known to lake communities, including the Swahili Arabs based in Ujiji and Nsumbu. David Livingstone sighted the mouth of the Lufubu in June 1867 from the top of the south-east escarpment and crossed the river inland on his route that year from southern Lake Tanganyika to Lake Mweru. In the 1880s British missionaries, following Livingstone, and colonial officers, started visiting the area from Abercorn (Mbala) and Mpulungu.

In 1883 a site on the east bank of the Lufubu, about 6 km from its mouth, was chosen by Edward Hore and Alfred Swann of the London Missionary Society as a temporary shipyard to assemble the SS Good News, intended to transport preachers around the lake. This steam-and-sail powered 54-foot steamship was sent from Britain in pieces and was the first such vessel launched on Lake Tanganyika. The Lufubu site was chosen partly because Hore had good memories of the Lungu communites who inhabited the southwest lake shores, and because he did not want the work to be disrupted by numerous conflicts which were arising, including those with the Swahili Arabs over the slave trade, and Hore felt that Mpulungu would be vulnerable. The construction took two years, the Good News being launched in 1885. In 1945 the building and launch site was marked with a monument, which was later entered into the National Monuments register as 'The Good News Monument'.

On the south bank in the lower valley, around Chipasense, communities fish, grow rice and other crops and farm fish in ponds. Owing to a rise in the level of the lake of about 2 m since 2018, some fields are now underwater.

== Wildlife and tourism on the Lufubu River ==
The Lufubu River is notable in Central Africa for its diverse wildlife comprising mammals, including large mammals such as elephant and buffalo, reptiles including crocodiles, birds including aquatic birds, and fish. At the same time, the wetlands in the river estuary are part of a Ramsar Wetland of International Importance site. The aquatic life of the Lufubu is poorly documented, and understudied, with great potential for species discovery. A 2023 study found that 25 of the 37 species sampled in the Lufubu are undescribed and endemic to the system.

As of June 2026 there are no hotels along the river and the only reliable access is by boat to the lower river from Nsumbu, Mpulungu, Ndole Bay Lodge or Nkamba Bay Lodge. In past dry seasons the National Park has operated some 4WD tours on tracks to Chomba Camp and Kabyolwe Camp on the northern or eastern bank of the river. Although some dirt tracks from Mpulungu reach Lukwesa and Chipasense on the southern bank of the lower river, they are not passable in the rainy season, and there are no facilities or river crossings there. There is no reliable road access to the middle or upper sections of the Lufubu.

== Proposal for hydroelectric power plants on the river ==
The Lufubu Power Company has proposed building a cascade of three hydropower plants for a total generating capacity of 326 MW from a hydraulic head of 315 m on the Lufubu River. Each plant would comprise a dam and power station with high voltage power lines. The three plants would be:

1. On the upper river entirely with the Nsumbu National Park
2. On the middle section of the river near Chika Falls, also entirely within the Park
3. On the lower river before Chomba, where the river is the park boundary.

Construction would require roads to be built into the park probably from the south. As of June 2026 no plans or schedule have been announced.
