= Lupososhi =

Constituency of the National Assembly of Zambia

Lupososhi is a constituency of the National Assembly of Zambia. It covers a rural area to the north of Lake Bangweulu in Lupososhi District of Northern Province.

== List of MPs ==
Election year	MP	Party
1983	Athanasio Kabaso	United National Independence Party
1988	Athanasio Kabaso	United National Independence Party
1991	Simon Mwila	Movement for Multi-Party Democracy
1996	Elpidius Mweni	Movement for Multi-Party Democracy
2001	Emmanuel Mpakata	Patriotic Front
2006	Albert Mulonga	Movement for Multi-Party Democracy
2011	Lazarous Chungu	Patriotic Front
2016	Lazarous Chungu	Patriotic Front
2021	Emmanuel Musonda	Patriotic Front
2026	Shadreck Mwansa	United Party for National Development
