= Lazarous Chungu =

Zambian politician and Member of Parliament

Member of the National Assembly of Zambia
- In office September 2011 – August 2021
- Constituency: Lupososhi

Personal details
- Born: October 25, 1966 (age 59) Zambia
- Party: Patriotic Front
- Spouse: Married
- Education: ACCA; Diploma in Marketing & Sales Management; Certificate in Project Management
- Occupation: Politician, accountant
- Profession: Accountant

Lazarous Bwalya Chungu (born 25 October 1966) is a Zambian politician and accountant who served as the Member of Parliament for Lupososhi Constituency from 2011 to 2021. He is a member of the Patriotic Front (PF).

== Political career ==
Chungu stood as the Patriotic Front candidate in Lupososhi at the 2011 general election and was elected. After Edgar Lungu won the January 2015 presidential by-election, he appointed Chungu as the Deputy Minister in the Office of the Vice-President.

At the 2016 general election, Chungu was re-elected as the Lupososhi member of parliament. In July 2019, he was appointed as the Provincial Minister for Northern Province by President Lungu.
