= Subdivisions of Zambia =

Present subdivisions of Zambia

Zambia is divided into ten provinces (since 2012), each administered by an appointed provincial minister. Each province is divided into several districts with a total of 116 districts in the nation (since 2016). Each district contains one or several constituencies with a total of 226 constituencies in the nation (since 2026). Each constituency contains several wards with a total of 1828 wards in the nation (since 2021).

Districts of Zambia

== Provinces of Zambia ==
The ten provinces of Zambia are:

- Central
- Copperbelt
- Eastern
- Luapula
- Lusaka
- Muchinga
- Northern
- North-Western
- Southern
- Western

== Districts of Zambia ==
Each province of Zambia is divided into several districts with a total number of 116 districts in the nation (since 2016). Each district is administered by a mayor or council chairperson.

== Constituencies of Zambia ==
Each district of Zambia contains one or several constituencies with a total number of 226 constituencies in the nation (since 2026). Each constituency is represented by a member of parliament.

Map of the Zambian National Assembly constituencies

== Wards of Zambia ==
Each constituency is divided into several wards, with a total number of 1858 wards in the nation as of the August 2021 election. Each ward is represented by a councillor.

== See also ==
- Bibliography of the history of Zambia
