= Peter Tsotsi Juma =

- Born: Peter Juma; 1932; Mbala District, Zambia
- Died: 2000 (aged 67–68)
- Occupation: Singer
- Years active: 1940s – 1980s
- Formerly of: Nashil Pichen Kazembe, African Eagles Lupopo Band, Benson Simbeye

Peter Tsotsi Juma (1932–2000), born Peter Juma was a Zambian folk teller, social commentator and musician. He rose to fame with the popular song Muka Muchona. Hespent most of his active years both in Zambia and East Africa. He migrated to Tanzania in 1940s and then moved to Kenya where he married and lived. His music is classified as Zam-Rhumba.

He is well known for the hits "Bashi Chanda (Njebeniko Njishibe Ichishinka)", "Tyson" and "Muka Muchona" which were recorded upon his return to Zambia from Kenya.

He lived in Kenya for a long time and established it as his home. He was married to a Kenyan woman named Margaret Njiru, with whom he had five children, three girls and two boys. In 1962, he met fellow Zambian Nashil Pichen Kazembe Kazembe and did a number of songs together.

Peter Tsotsi Juma and Nashil Pichen played a critical role in the development of the Equator Sound Band's "twist" style, modeled after the South African kwela rhythm (see Before Benga Vol. Two: The Nairobi Sound, Original Music).

== Discography ==
=== Selected singles ===
- "Umaume Tachepa"
- "Congratulations KK"
- "Bush Baby"
- "Twist"
- "Tamaa Mbaya"
- "Nkumbuka Adija"
- "Mulofa Moja (Poor Fellow)"
- "Emi Nitakufa Nae"
- "Kajo Golo Weka"

- "Muka muchona"

== See also ==
Music of Zambia
