= Leonard Mbao =

Zambian politician and Member of Parliament

Hon. Leonard Mbao MP

Member of the National Assembly for Mpulungu
- Incumbent
- Assumed office August 2021
- Preceded by: Chomba Sikazwe

Personal details
- Born: February 22, 1980 (age 46)
- Party: United Party for National Development
- Spouse: Married
- Profession: Politician, Accountant

Leonard Mbao (born 22 February 1980) is a Zambian politician serving as the Member of the National Assembly for Mpulungu constituency since 2021. He is a member of the United Party for National Development (UPND).

== Political career ==
Mbao stood as the United Party for National Development candidate in Mpulungu constituency at the August 2021 general election and was elected. He was then appointed as the Provincial Minister for Northern Province by President Hakainde Hichilema the following month.

== See also ==
- List of members of the National Assembly of Zambia (2021–2026)
