= Chitimukulu =

Name of the King of the Bemba

The Chitimukulu is the King or Paramount Chief of the Bemba, the largest ethnic group in Zambia. All Chitimukulus, as well as lesser Bemba chiefs, are members of the Bena Ng'andu (English: Crocodile Clan). Potential successors to the ruling Chikimukulu are chosen from the various Bemba chiefs.

The king's title comes from the first recorded Chitimukulu, who was originally named Chiti Muluba, but changed his name to Chiti Mukulu (lit. 'Chiti the Great'). In the 18th century, the Bemba came out from their original lands in the Luba Empire of Mukulumpe in DR Congo to eventually settle the country around Kasama in Zambia's Northern Province.

The original Bemba Kings are said to have been descendants of King Mukulumpe and his last wife Mumbi Mukasa who belonged to the Crocodile Clan. Together, they had four children: Katongo, Nkole, Chiti and Chilufya Mulenga. The Bemba were given a kingdom to rule by their father. According to legend, they then built a tower to help them see approaching enemies from a distance, but the tower collapsed, causing several deaths. The Bemba leaders were called by their father to exculpate themselves but in the end, their elder brother was arrested and blinded to send a message to his young brothers. After the Bemba Kings saw the cruelty of their father, they decided to leave and settle where they would find a dead crocodile. After years of wandering in Zambia the Bemba settled in Mungwi District, having found a dead crocodile. The first Chitimukulu to settle in Lubemba was Chilufya Mulenga.

Following the death of Chitimukulu Chilufya Mwango Chitapankwa III, Henry Kanyanta Sosola Chitimukulu was formally recognised and confirmed as the 38th King of the Bemba on the 25 January 2015. The current king of the Bemba Kingdom is King Kanyanta Manga II Henry Sosola.

A Chitimukulu list, translated from Chibemba:

Chitimukulu I, of Mukulumpe. Born Chiti Muluba, took name of Chitimukulu.

Chitimukulu II Nkole Wamapembwe, of Mukulumpe.

Chitimukulu III Chilufya, of Chilufya Mulenga. This is the proverb that says: Chilufya of Two Sources, because he was born of two men: Chiti and Nkole

Chitimukulu IV Mulenga Pokili, younger brother of Chilufya.

Chitimukulu V Kayula wa Nseko. He was greatly loved by the people.

Chitimukulu VI Katongo

Chitimukulu VII Kasansu

Chitimukulu VIII Kapolyo

Chitimukulu IX Kanabesa.According to Imilandu ya Babema by F. Tanguy Kanabesa came from Nkulungwe, in the area of Mwaba, near the river Chambeshi. He was greatly respected in his role as Lord of the Bemba. To this day, we still honour our chief, saying: Kanabesa! Even in Catholic prayers conducted in Bemba, sometimes, they even praise God by that name, saying: Twakutotela Kanabesa! (Thank you Kanabesa)

Chitimukulu X Lwipa

Chitimukulu XI Kapampa Mubanshi. This Lord of the Bemba suffered from leprosy (ifibashi). So, he was not buried at Mwalule (traditional resting place of Bemba kings), no, he was buried at kuntulo ya Nsofu (the Resting Place of the Elephant).

Chitimukulu XII Chipolonge

Chitimukulu XIII Chimanga

Chitimukulu XIV Chimfwembe

Chitimukulu XV Nshiwile

Chitimukulu XVI Chibengele. This is why we praise him, saying: You are Chibengele Namuncenene, the one with teeth like a comb. Lord of the Bemba, Chibengele, who established the five-line succession of the Chitimukulu on the side of the Kalungu, coming from Ng'wena.

Chitimukulu XVII Mutale wa Munkombwe

Chitimukulu XVIII Chifunda of Busoshi. The reason they called him Chifunda ca Busoshi is because of his appearance, as he was one who gathers like a bundle.

Chitimukulu XIX Sekwila

Chitimukulu XX Kasonde

Chitimukulu XXI Salala-bana-bonke (He who strikes fear). He established/stabilized the Bemba kingdom because his enemies feared his fierceness

Chitimukulu XXII Mukuka wa Malekano. He is the one who started the Mwamba title, when he gave his younger brother, Chitundu (Mwamba I), the land of Tuna.

Chitimukulu XXIII Chilya Mafwa. Nephew of Mukuka wa Malekano. Mubanga Kashampupo, younger brother of Chilya Mafwa, became Mwamba II. During the time of Chilya Mafwa, there was a great disaster for the Bemba Kingdom. Chilya started the Makasa title when he gave his nephew the land of Mpanda. Nondo-moya became the first Makasa.

Chitimukulu XXIV Chincinta Susula. Nephew of Chilya, he did not dies as Chitimukulu. They removed him and replace him with Chileshe Chepela. He died from smallpox among the Mambwe, but he was buried in Mwalule.

Chitimukulu XXV Chileshe Chepela. He had a deformed hand - one of his hands had no fingers. He gave his brother, Mutale wa Kabwe, the title Lord of Tuna (Mwamba III). Chileshe is the one the Ngoni found as Chitimukulu. Therefore, he was the one who prevented the Ngoni from entering Bemba lands. He further strengthened Bemba lands by defeating the Lungu and the Bisa.

Chitimukulu XXVI Bwembya (Chikalamo, Chinyamasako). Younger brother of Chileshe Chepela, he was given the title while the previous ruler had not died yet

Chitimukulu XXVII Mutale Chitapankwa (?-1883). He took the milk of his older brother Bwembya, and he seized the necklaces (tribute) of many people and took them away.

Chitimukulu XXVIII Sampa Kapalakhasha (1883-1896). The people did not like him very much as he was too controlling over the Bemba chiefs and lesser chiefs

Chitimukulu XXIX Makumba (1896-1911). During his reign, the British Colonial Authorities arrived in Bemba lands.

Chitimukulu XXX Mutale Chikwanda (1911-1916)

Chitimukulu XXXI Ponde Chisowa (1916-1925). Younger brother of Mutale Chikwanda (Chitimukulu XXX)

Chitimukulu XXXII Kanyata (1925-1943). He ascended from the Mwamba position; he was Mwamba VI.

Chitimukulu XXXIII Musungu Kafula (1943-1946)

Chitimukulu XXXIV Musenga (1946-?)

Chitimukulu XXXV Bwembya Changala (?-?)

Chitimukulu XXXVI Mutale Chitapankwa II (?-2007)

Chitimukulu XXXVII Chilufya Mwango (Mutale Chitapankwa III) (2007-2012)

Chitimukulu XXXVIII Kanyanta-manga II (2012-)
