= Peter Tsotsi =

Zimbabweann musician

- Citizenship: Zimbabwean
- Occupation: Musician

Peter Tsotsi is a Zimbabweann musician. He was one of the founders of the Equator Sound Band, along with Adolf Banyora, Nashil Pichen, Charles Ssonko, Gabriel Omolo, Daudi Kabaka, and Fadhili Williams Mdawida. The group had many Swahili language hits in the 1960s in Africa, including "Mulofa moja, "Usiniringiei", "Super girl", "Kondakta", "Pole Musa", "Veronica", and "e".

Along with Pichen, Tsotsi is recognized as one of the major contributors to the "twist" style of African popular music in the 1960s, modeled on earlier kwela music.
