= Senga District =

- District
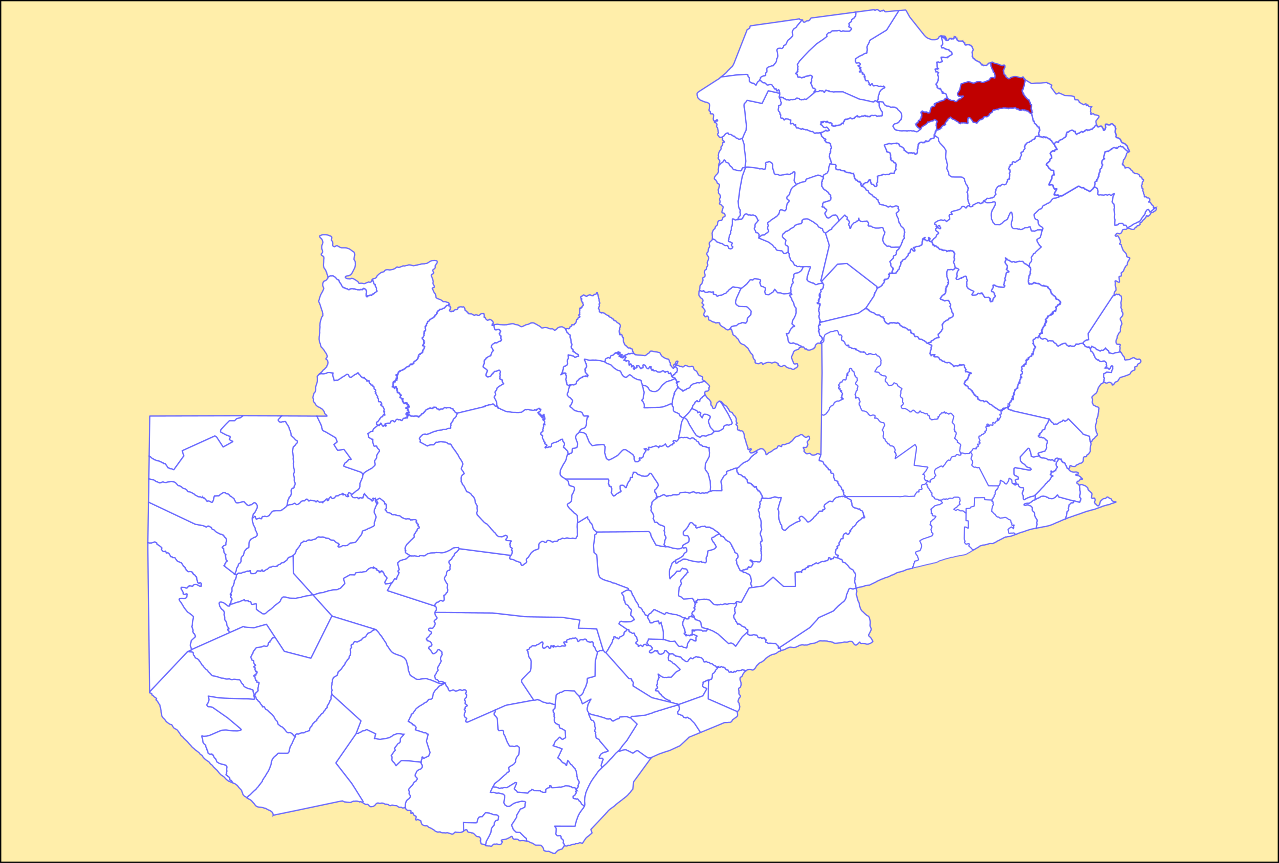
- District location in Zambia
- Country: Zambia
- Province: Northern Province

Area
  - Total: 5,183.7 km^{2} (2,001.4 sq mi)

Population (2022)
  - Total: 126,308
  - Density: 24.366/km^{2} (63.109/sq mi)
- Time zone: UTC+2 (CAT)

Senga District, also known as Senga Hill District, is a district of Northern Province, Zambia. It was separated from Mbala District in 2016. As of the 2022 Zambian Census, the district had a population of 126,308 people.

== Climate ==
The district is situated in the tropics, with an average elevation of 1,500 meters above sea level. The climate is similar to a Mediterranean climate, characterized by mild, temperate conditions. The area receives an annual average rainfall of approximately 1,240 mm, with the rainy season lasting from November to April. The district also has vast expanses of undeveloped land, offering significant potential for farm block development.

== Infrastructure ==
- Electricity: The district is not connected to the national electricity grid.
- Healthcare: Senga Hill has a mini-hospital that is equipped with essential medical facilities.
- Water Supply: Senga Hill relies on boreholes and open wells for water supply, as it is not connected to a piped water system.
