= Mweru Wantipa National Park =

National park in Zambia

Coordinates: 8°45′S 29°30′E

- IUCN category II (national park)
- Location: Northern Province, Zambia

Mweru Wantipa National Park is named after Lake Mweru Wantipa in the Northern Province of Zambia. Once hosting abundant wildlife including lion, elephant, and black rhinoceros, it has had no management and protection for several decades, and lacks visitor facilities. Consequently, its wildlife population has been much reduced in recent years, the black rhinoceros is extinct in the area and elephant and lion are probably also wiped out.

Though mostly in the Central Zambezian Miombo woodlands ecoregion, the Mweru-Wantipa/Sumbu area has a rare and endangered ecoregion or vegetation type known as Itigi-Sumbu thicket, an almost impenetrable bush consisting of about a hundred plant species woven together so densely that it is virtually impossible to walk through. It is known from only one other location in central Tanzania. 70% of Itigi-Sumbu thicket in the Mweru-Wantipa/Sumbu area has already been destroyed, even where supposedly protected in the national park, on the north shore of the lake where some of the largest patches are located. It is estimated that the remainder will be lost in the next 20 years.

== See also ==
- Wildlife of Zambia
