= Lunte District =

- District
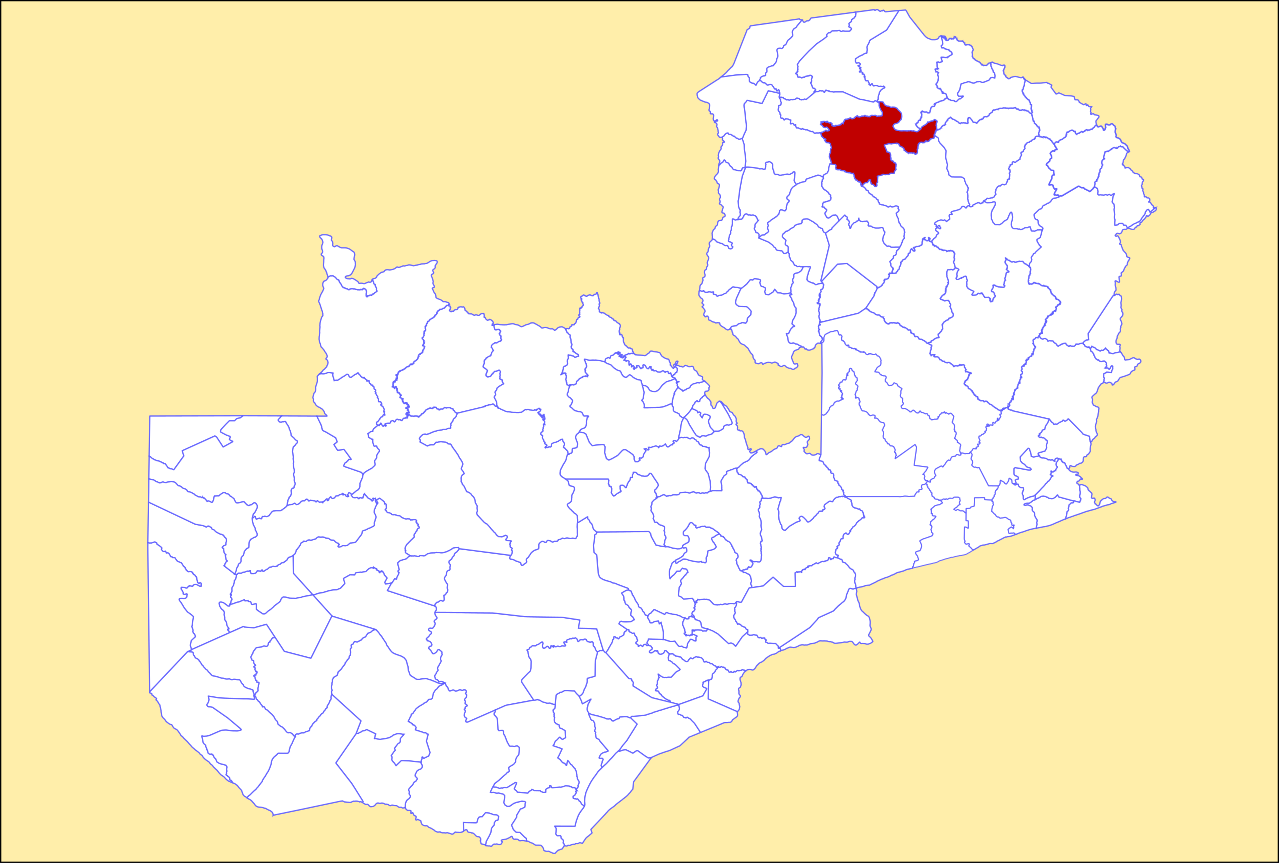
- District location in Zambia
- Country: Zambia
- Province: Northern Province

Area
  - Total: 7,782.1 km^{2} (3,004.7 sq mi)

Population (2022)
  - Total: 84,573
  - Density: 10.868/km^{2} (28.147/sq mi)
- Time zone: UTC+2 (CAT)

Lunte District is a district of Northern Province, Zambia. It was separated from Mporokoso District in 2017. As of the 2022 Zambian Census, the district had a population of 84,573 people. The District headquarters is at the Lunte Town Council building in Mukupa Kaoma.

== Livestock ==
The Kalungwishi Breeding Centre in Lunte District has been stocked with Boran cattle and serves as a breeding centre aimed at providing high-quality livestock to farmers in the province and across Zambia. The government also plans to introduce goat breeding at the centre to meet the increasing demand for livestock, both locally and for export.
