= Mporokoso =

Town in the Northern Province of Zambia

- Town
- Location in Zambia
- Coordinates: 9°23′00″S 30°06′00″E
- Country: Zambia
- Province: Northern Province
- District: Mporokoso District

Population (2010)
  - Total: 100,993
- population of entire district
- Time zone: UTC+2 (CAT)

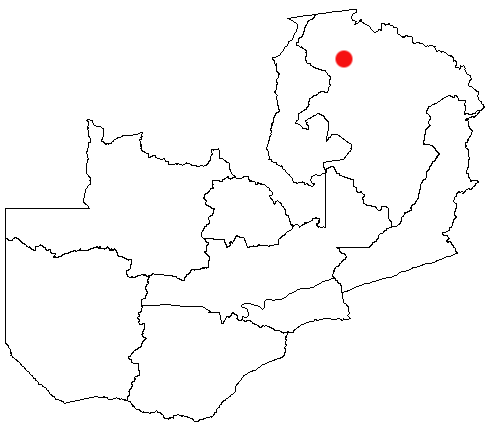
Location of Mporokoso in Zambia

Mporokoso (also spelled and pronounced 'Mpolokoso' and 'Mumpolokoso') is a town in the Northern Province of Zambia, lying at an elevation of nearly 1500 m on the flat plateau about 75 km south east of Lake Mweru Wantipa and 100 km south-west of Lake Tanganyika. It is named for Chief Mporokoso (also spelled 'Mumpolokoso') a senior chief of the Bemba people whose palace is located at Chishamwamba close to the town. Mporokoso District is also one of the 12 administrative districts of the Northern Province.

A large population of refugees from the Second Congo War living at the UNHCR-administered refugee camp at Mwange, 32 km west of the town, are being repatriated after the end of that war.

A number of waterfalls lie within 50 km of the town. The closest is the Kapumo Falls, 7km south-west of the town centre. Pule Falls and Mumbuluma Falls III are on the Luangwa River which flows to the south of the town. Lupupa Falls are on the nearby Mukubwe River.
