= Lupososhi District =

- District
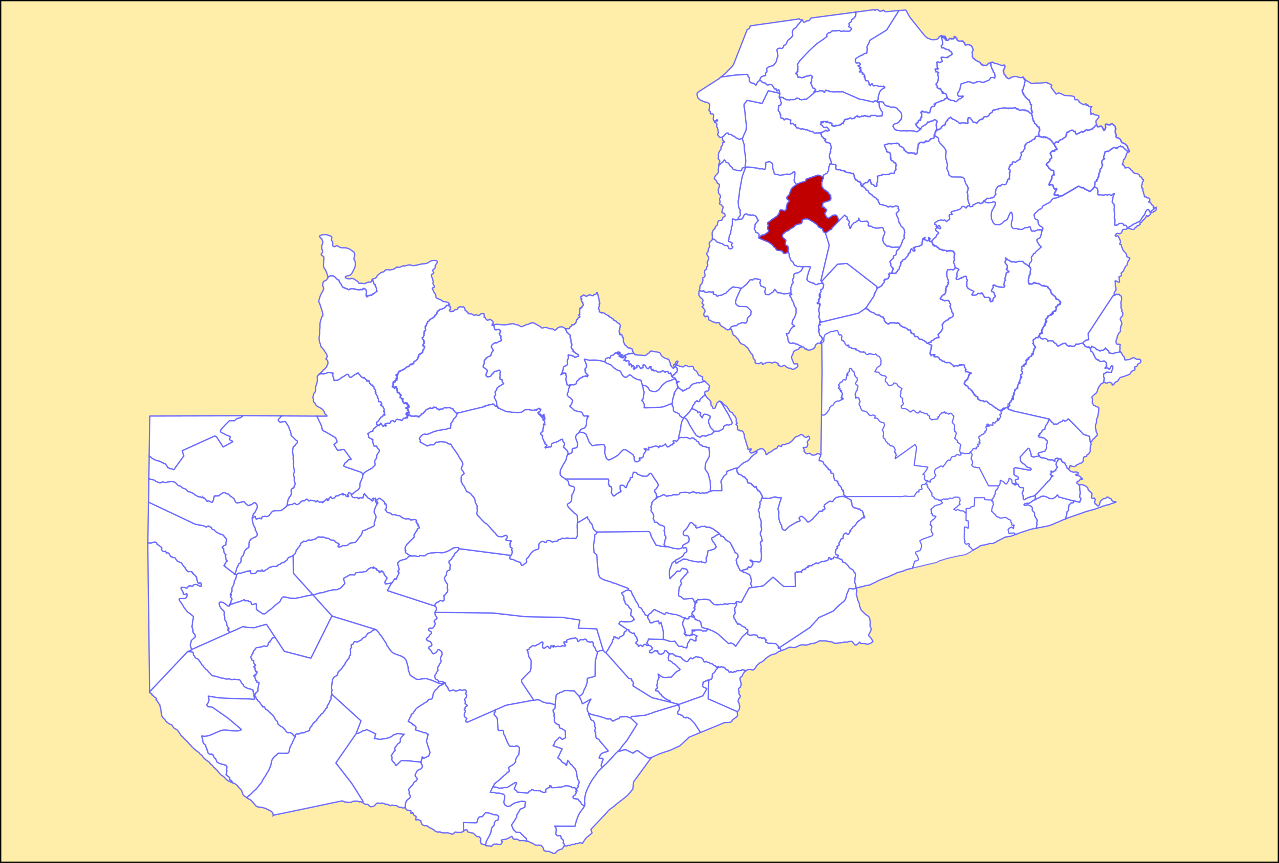
- District location in Zambia
- Country: Zambia
- Province: Northern Province

Area
  - Total: 4,127.4 km^{2} (1,593.6 sq mi)

Population (2022)
  - Total: 79,614
  - Density: 19.289/km^{2} (49.959/sq mi)
- Time zone: UTC+2 (CAT)

Lupososhi District is a district of Northern Province, Zambia. It was created in 2018 by splitting Luwingu District. As of the 2022 Zambian Census, the district had a population of 79,614 people.

== Climate ==
Lupososhi experiences a tropical climate with distinct seasons. The cold season, from May to July, sees temperatures ranging from 8°C to 22°C, while the warmer months from August to October have temperatures ranging from 21°C to 24°C. The district's high elevation and its proximity to water bodies such as lakes and swamps help moderate the climate, making it suitable for agriculture, livestock, and fish farming.

=== Rainfall ===
The district's rainfall patterns are monitored through a single rain gauge located at the local government offices. In 2009, the total recorded rainfall amounted to 1058.3 mm (Recorded from January 2009 to December 2009).

== Geography ==
The district's terrain is divided between highlands in the north, where elevations range between 1,200 and 1,500 meters above sea level, and lower flatlands in the south, where elevations drop to around 900 meters. The southern region slopes towards the Bangweulu Basin, characterized by vast wetlands.
