= Districts of Zambia =

The ten provinces of Zambia are divided into a total of 116 districts as of 2018.

Article 109 in part VIII of the constitution of Zambia deals with local government. It states only that there should be some form of local government, and that this local government should be based on democratically elected councils on the basis of universal adult suffrage.

== Provincial districts in Zambia ==
Provincial Districts of Zambia

From 1997 until the 2011 election, Zambia was subdivided into 72 districts. After the 2011 election, a total of 45 new districts were created by Michael Sata and Edgar Lungu, bringing the total to 116 districts since April 2018.

Total Districts by Province as of 2021:

1. Central Province (11 districts)
2. Copperbelt Province (10 districts)
3. Eastern Province (15 districts)
4. Luapula Province (12 districts)
5. Lusaka Province (6 districts)
6. Muchinga Province (8 districts)
7. Northern Province (12 districts)
8. North-Western Province (11 districts)
9. Southern Province (15 districts)
10. Western Province (16 districts)

== List of districts per province ==
=== Central Province ===
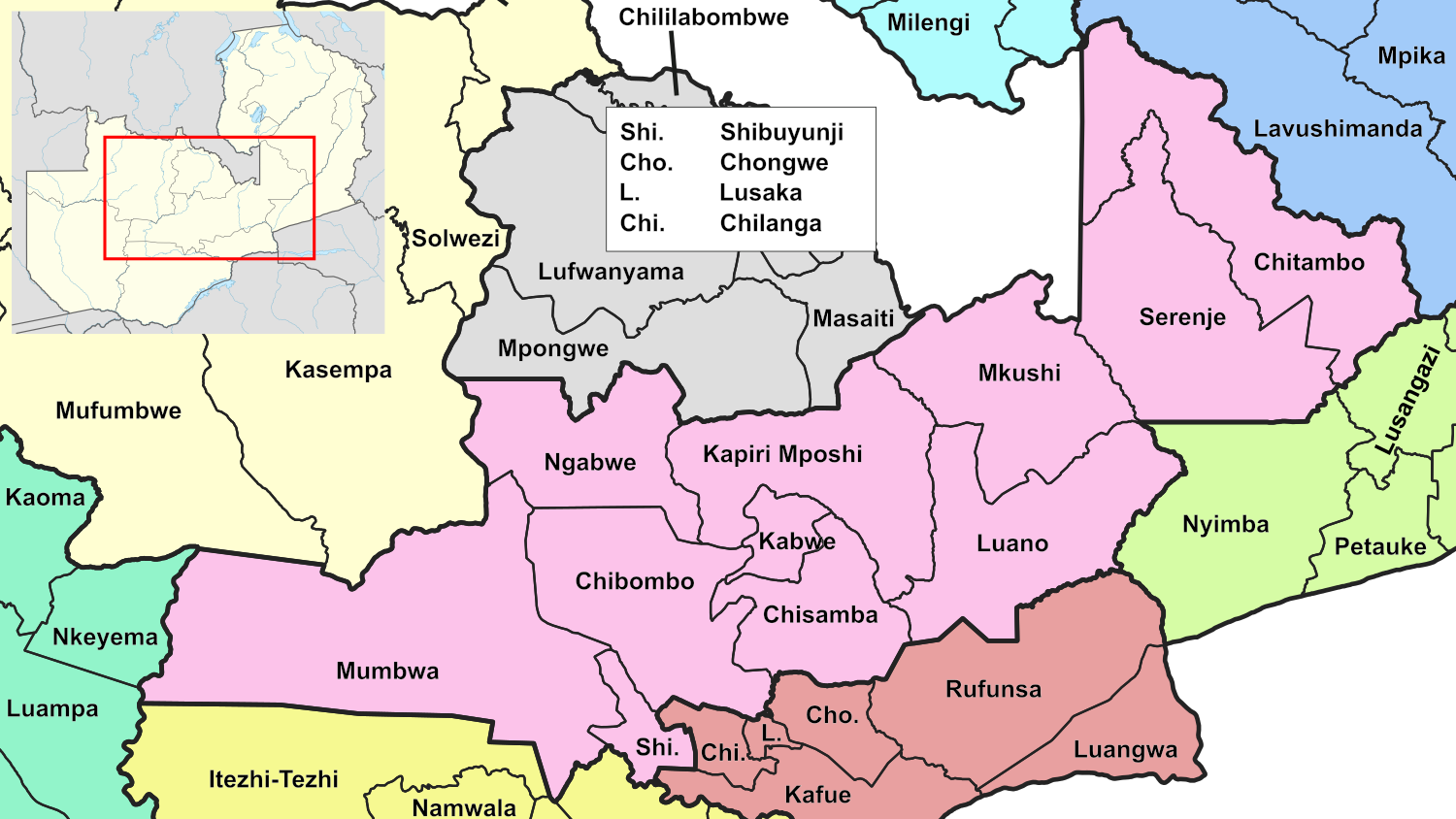
Districts of Central Province

Central Province is composed of 11 districts.

- Chibombo District
- Chisamba District
- Chitambo District
- Kabwe District
- Kapiri Mposhi District
- Luano District
- Mkushi District
- Mumbwa District
- Ngabwe District
- Serenje District
- Shibuyunji District

=== Copperbelt Province ===
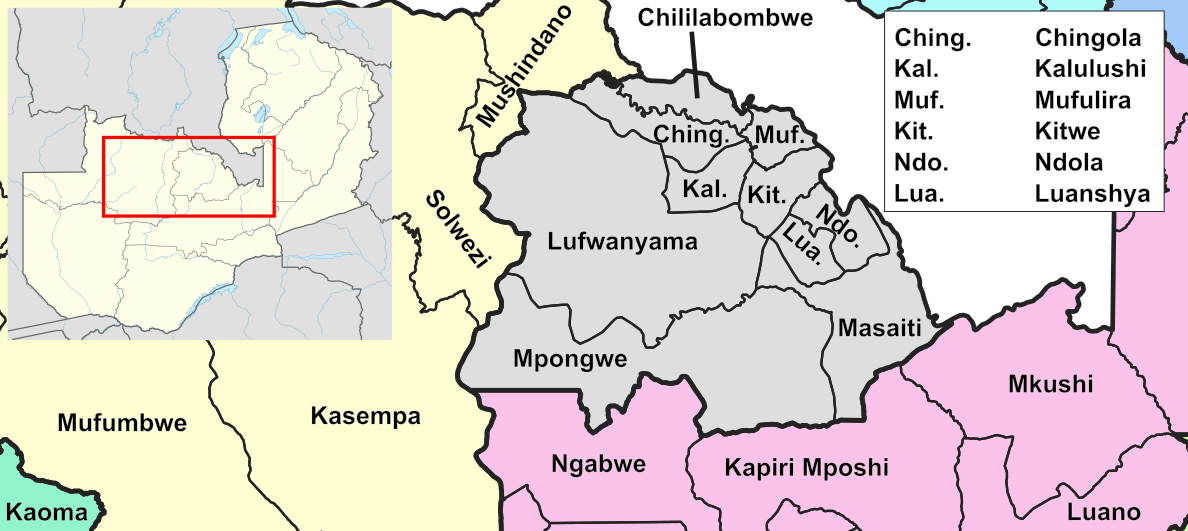
Districts of Copperbelt Province

Copperbelt Province is composed of 10 districts.

- Chililabombwe District
- Chingola District
- Kalulushi District
- Kitwe District
- Luanshya District
- Lufwanyama District
- Masaiti District
- Mpongwe District
- Mufulira District
- Ndola District

=== Eastern Province ===
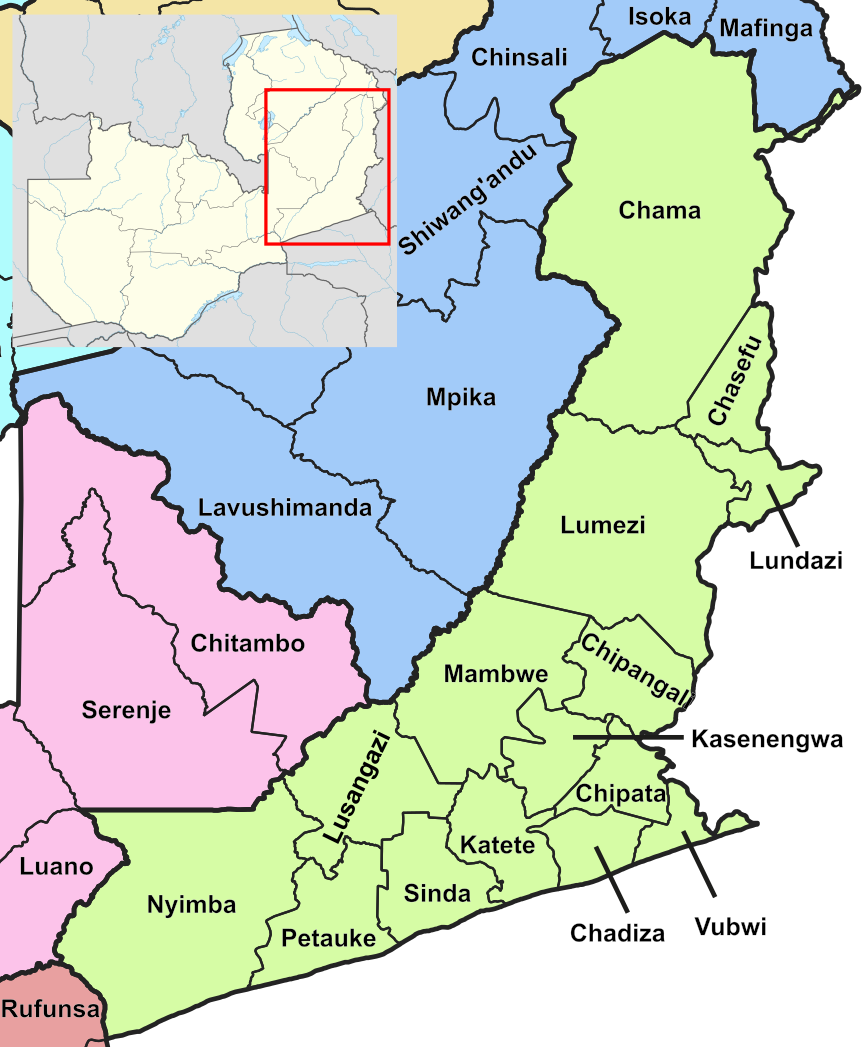
Districts of Eastern Province

Eastern Province is composed of 15 districts.

- Chadiza District
- Chama District
- Chasefu District
- Chipangali District
- Chipata District
- Kasenengwa District
- Katete District
- Lumezi District
- Lundazi District
- Lusangazi District
- Mambwe District
- Nyimba District
- Petauke District
- Sinda District
- Vubwi District

=== Luapula Province ===
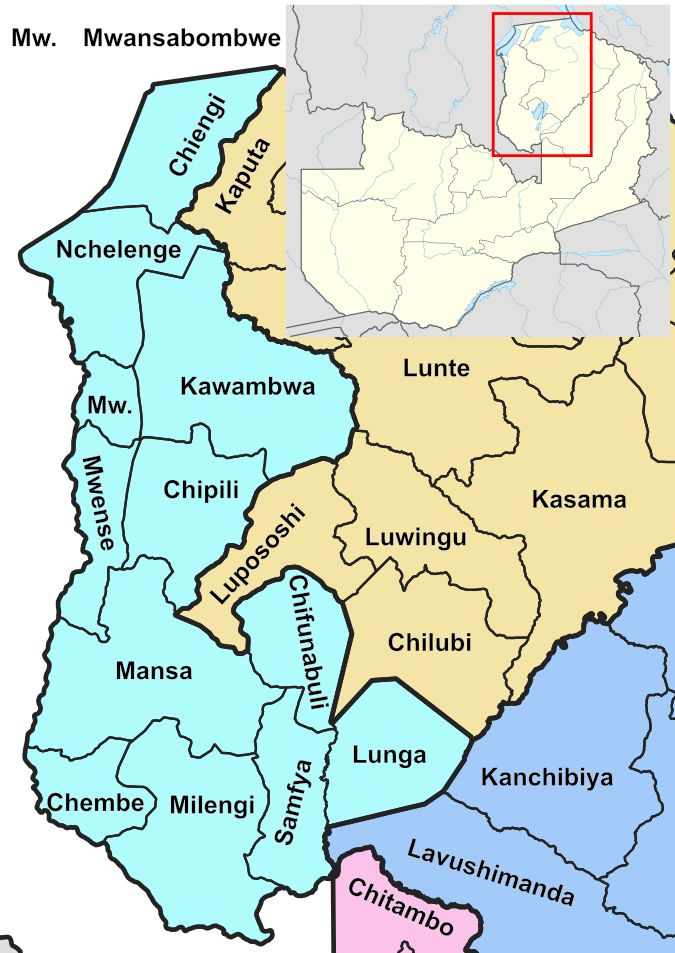
Districts of Luapula Province

Luapula Province is composed of 12 districts.

- Chembe District
- Chiengi District
- Chifunabuli District
- Chipili District
- Kawambwa District
- Lunga District
- Mansa District
- Milenge District
- Mwansabombwe District
- Mwense District
- Nchelenge District
- Samfya District

=== Lusaka Province ===
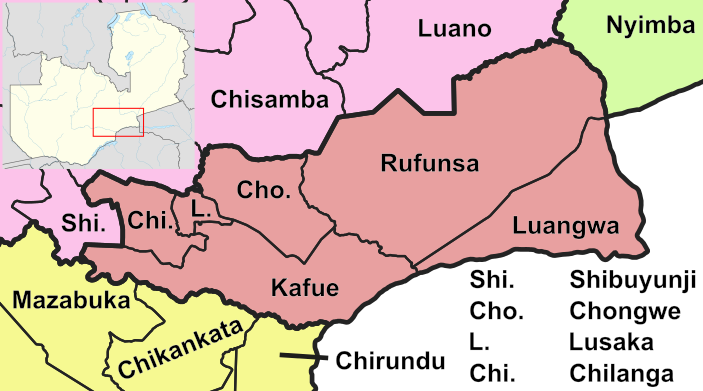
Districts of Lusaka Province

Lusaka Province is composed of 6 districts.

- Chilanga District
- Chongwe District
- Kafue District
- Luangwa District
- Lusaka District
- Rufunsa District

=== Muchinga Province ===
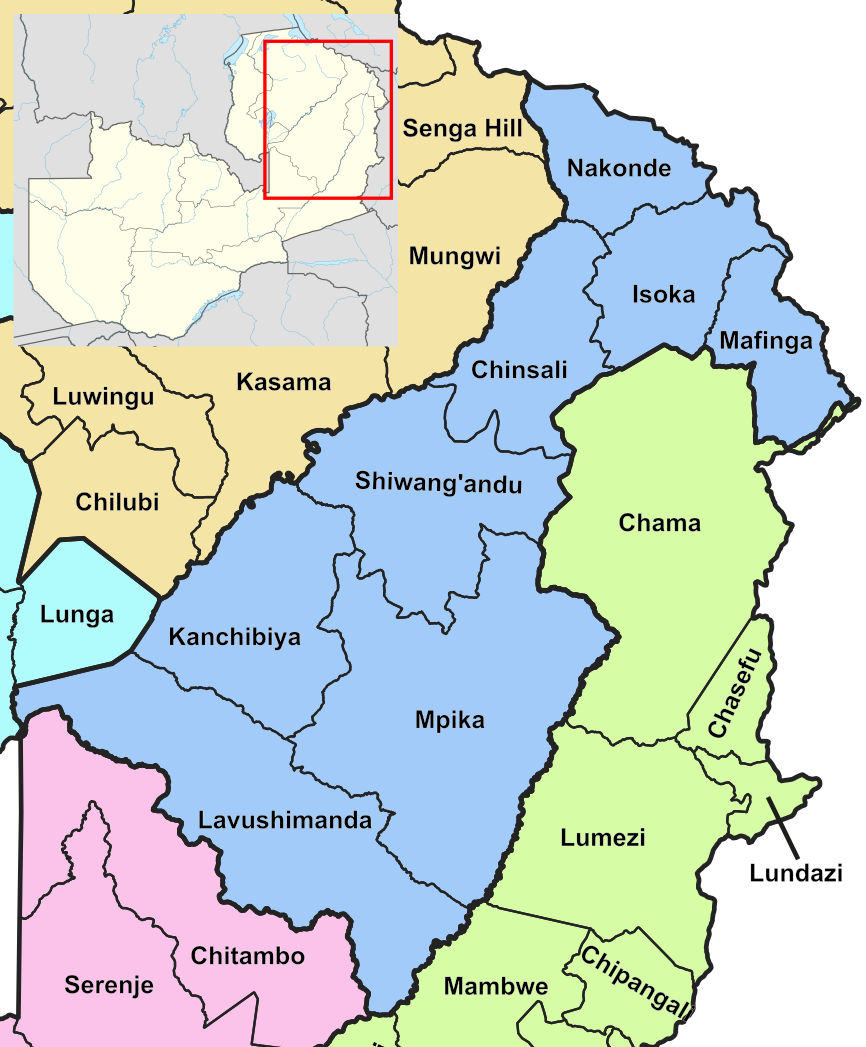
Districts of Muchinga Province

Muchinga Province is composed of 8 districts, with consideration of gazetting Chilinda area in Chinsali as the 9th district.

- Chinsali District
- Isoka District
- Kanchibiya District
- Lavushimanda District
- Mafinga District
- Mpika District
- Nakonde District
- Shiwang'andu District

=== Northern Province ===
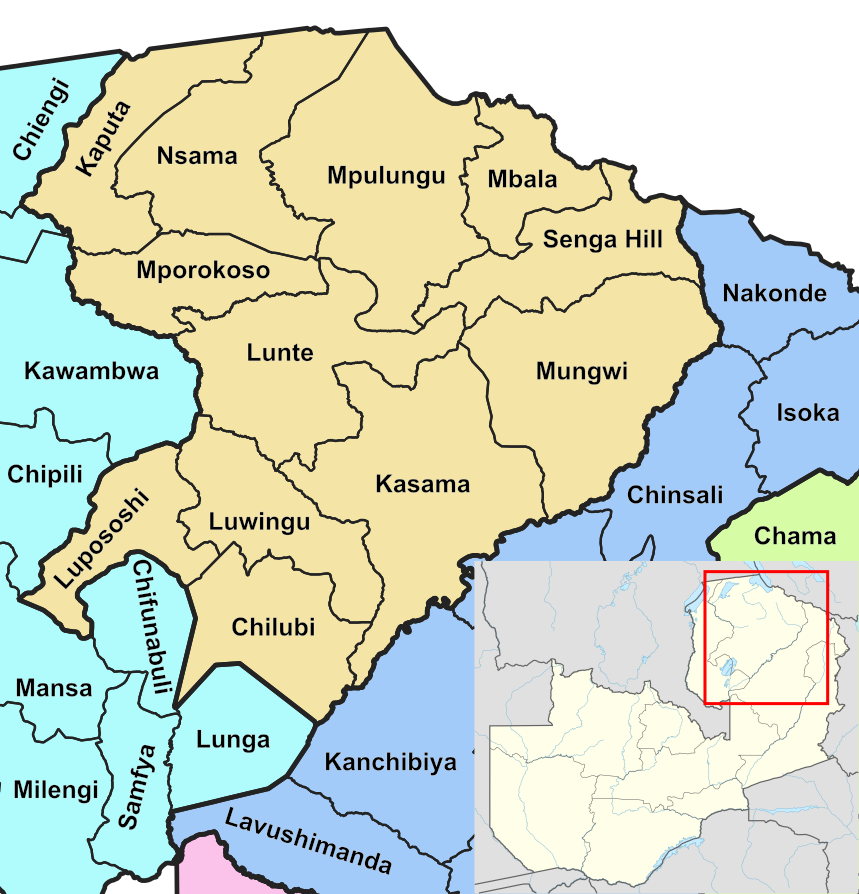
Districts of Northern Province

Northern Province is composed of 12 districts.

- Chilubi District
- Kaputa District
- Kasama District
- Lunte District
- Lupososhi District
- Luwingu District
- Mbala District
- Mporokoso District
- Mpulungu District
- Mungwi District
- Nsama District
- Senga District

=== North-Western Province ===
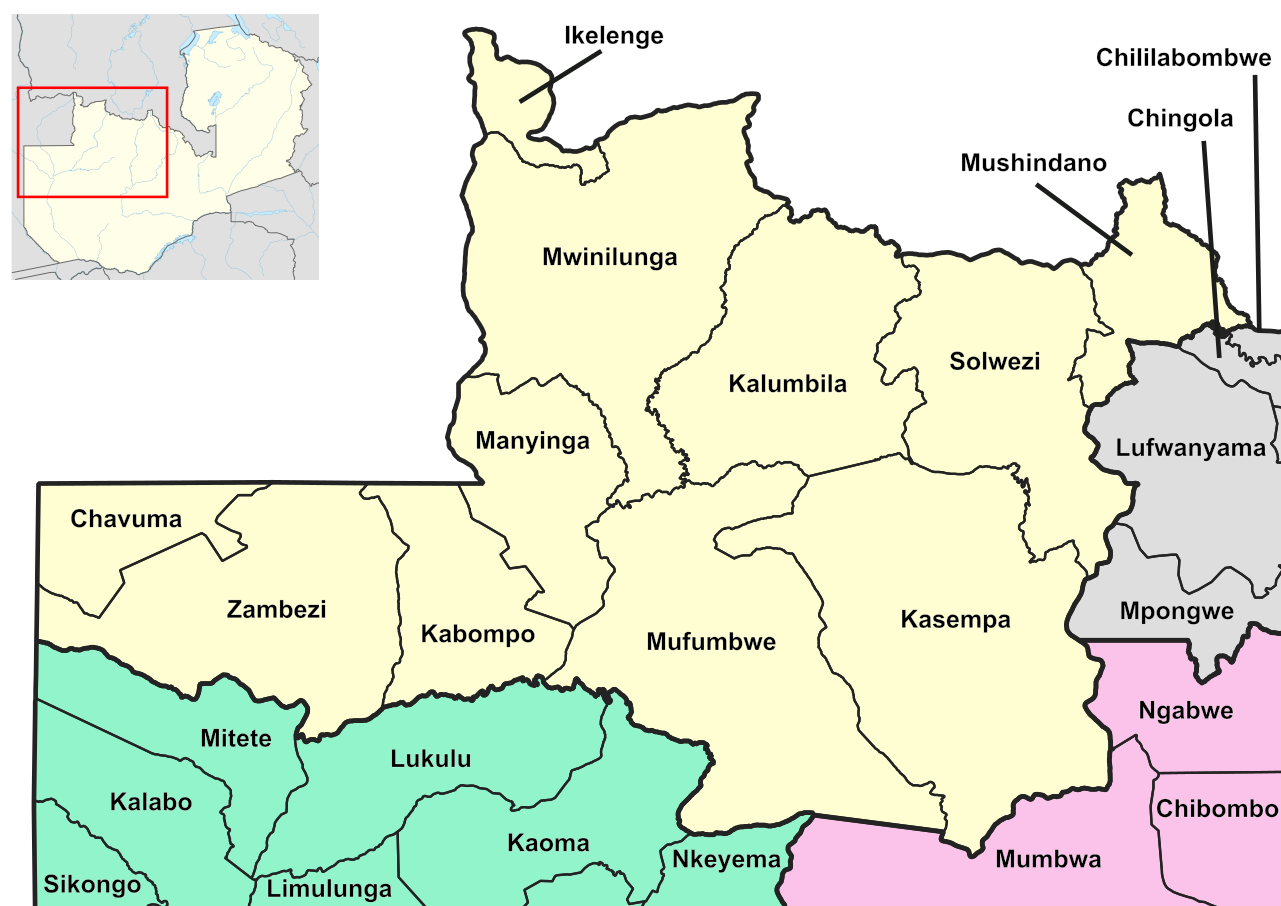
Districts of North-Western Province

North-Western Province is composed of 11 districts.

- Chavuma District
- Ikelenge District
- Kabompo District
- Kasempa District
- Kalumbila District
- Manyinga District
- Mufumbwe District
- Mushindamo District
- Mwinilunga District
- Solwezi District
- Zambezi District

=== Southern Province ===
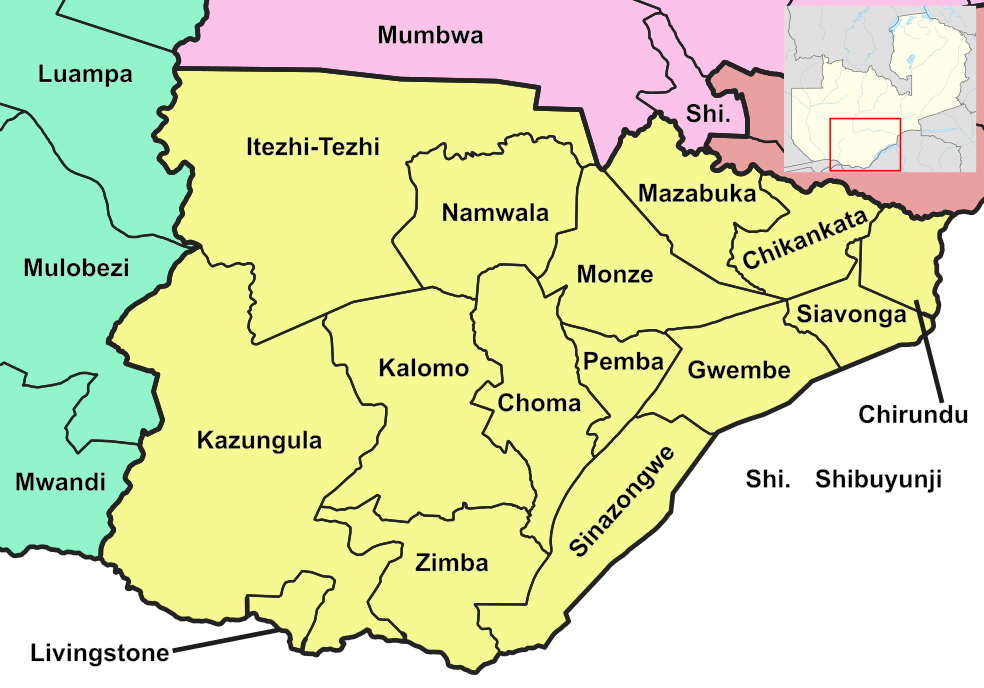
Districts of Southern Province

Southern Province is composed of 15 districts. The provincial capital was moved from Livingstone to Choma in 2012, with Livingstone retaining the status of national tourist capital.

- Chikankata District
- Chirundu District
- Choma District
- Gwembe District
- Itezhi-Tezhi District
- Kalomo District
- Kazungula District
- Livingstone District
- Mazabuka District
- Monze District
- Namwala District
- Pemba District
- Siavonga District
- Sinazongwe District
- Zimba District

=== Western Province ===
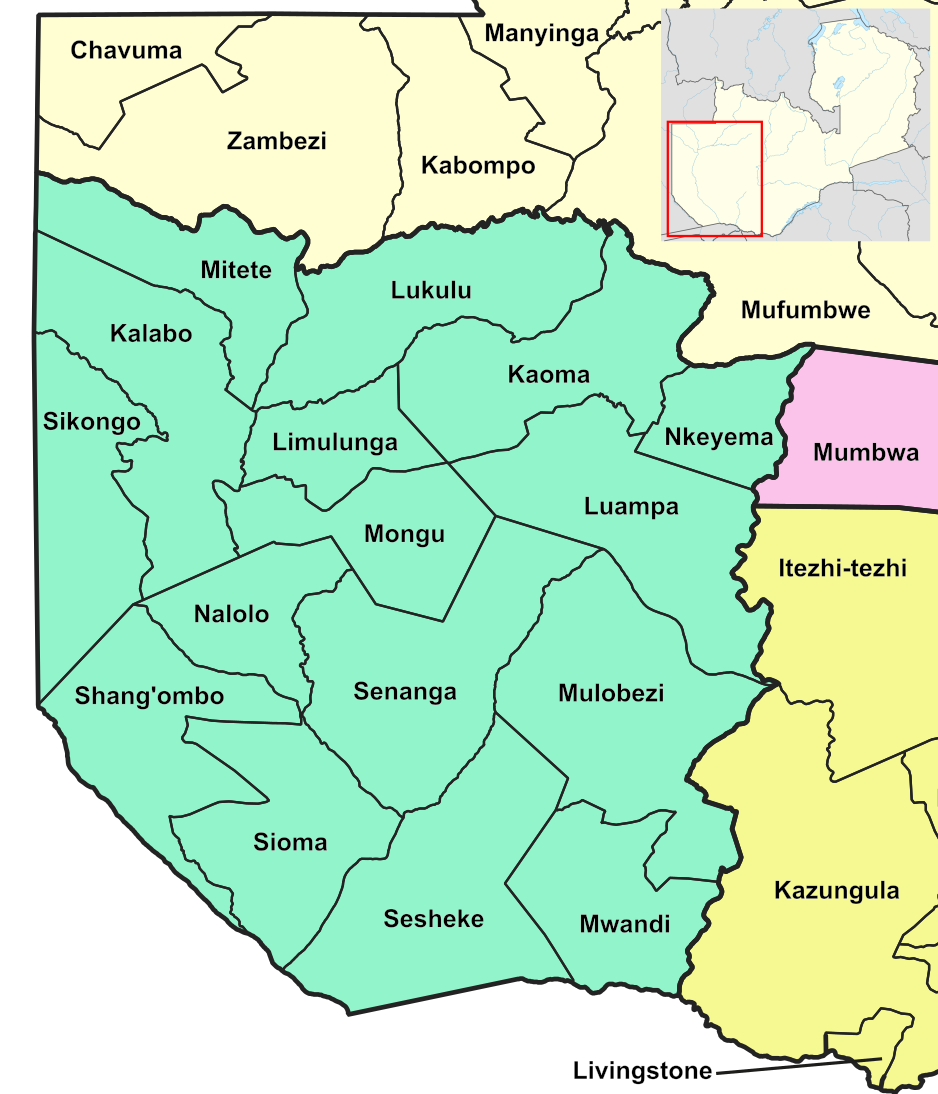
Districts of Western Province

Western Province is composed of 16 districts.

- Kalabo District
- Kaoma District
- Limulunga District
- Luampa District
- Lukulu District
- Mitete District
- Mongu District
- Mulobezi District
- Mwandi District
- Nalolo District
- Nkeyema District
- Senanga District
- Sesheke District
- Shang'ombo District
- Sikongo District
- Sioma District

== See also ==
- Bibliography of the history of Zambia
- Provinces of Zambia
- Subdivisions of Zambia
