= Lake Mweru Wantipa =

Lake and swamp system in northern Zambia

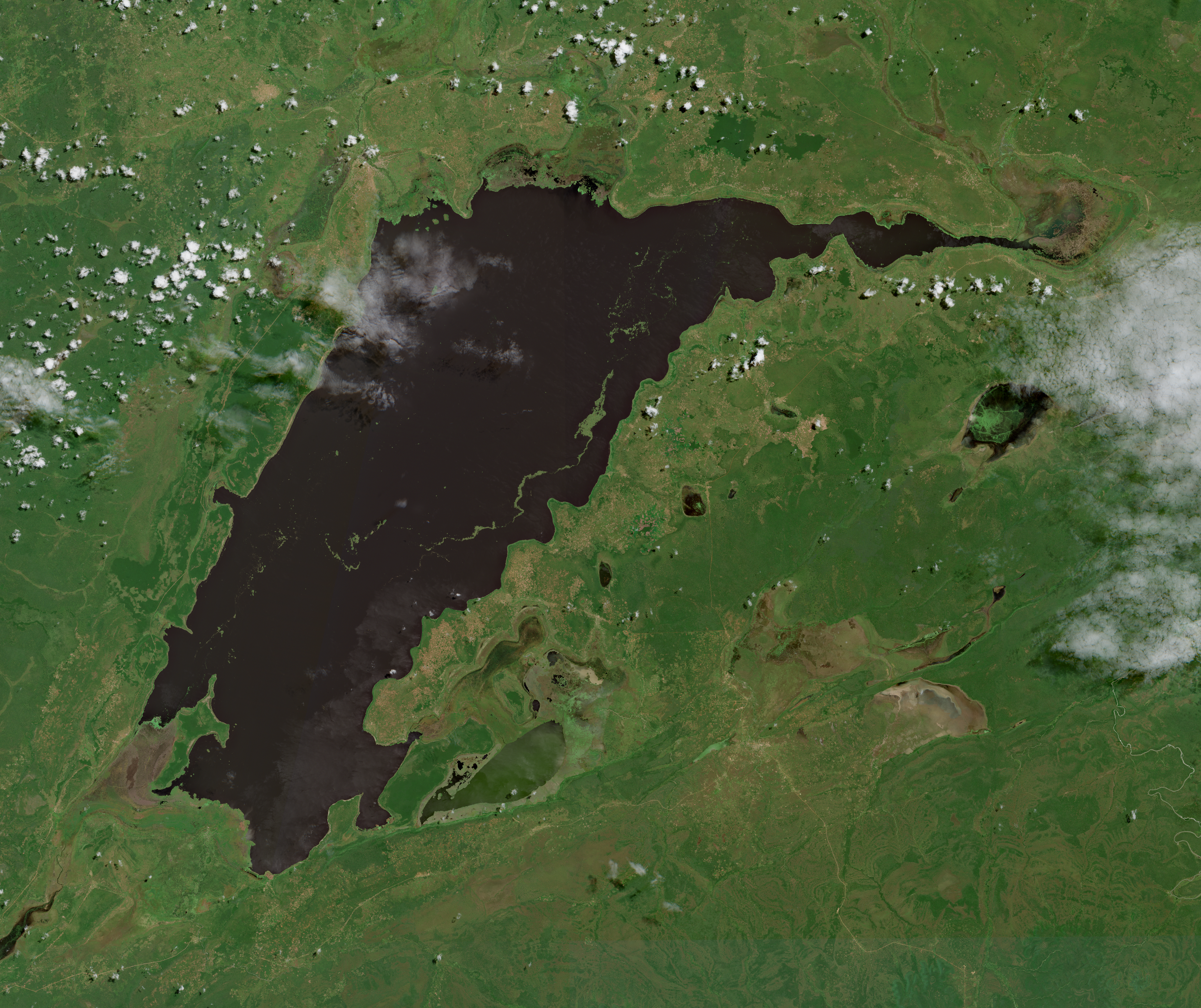
- Lake Mweru Wantipa on 3 April 2025

- Location within Zambia Location within Africa
- Location: Northern Province
- Coordinates: 8°42′S 29°46′E
- Basin countries: Zambia
- Max. length: 65 km (40 mi)
- Max. width: 20 km (12 mi)
- Surface area: 1,500 km^{2} (580 sq mi) (2005) dry (1916)
- Average depth: 2 m (6 ft 7 in)
- Max. depth: 5 m (16 ft)
- Surface elevation: 932 m (3,058 ft)
- Settlements: Kaputa

Lake Mweru Wantipa or Mweru-wa-Ntipa meaning "muddy lake" (also called 'Mweru Marsh') is a lake and swamp system in the Northern Province of Zambia. It has been regarded in the past as something of mystery, displaying fluctuations in water level and salinity which were not entirely explained by variation in rainfall levels; it has been known to dry out almost completely. This is compounded by its remoteness and it not receiving the same attention from geographers and geologists as its larger and more accessible neighbours, Lake Tanganyika, 25 km east, and Lake Mweru, 40 km west, with which its name is sometimes confused.

Lake Mweru Wantipa is a rift valley lake lying in a branch of the East African Rift, running from the Luapula River to Lake Tanganyika. There are some hot springs characteristics of a rift valley to the east. Its water is muddy in appearance, at times appearing reddish and 'slightly oily'. In the local dialect "wa ntipa" means "with mud", hence "Mweru Wantipa" distinguishes it from its bigger neighbour, Lake Mweru, which has clearer water.

== Sources and drainage ==
Rivers and streams, none very large, flow into Lake Mweru Wantipa and its swamps from the Mporokoso plateau about 32 km south, and the hills to the north-east in DR Congo. It was thought to drain via its south-western swamps and a dambo called the Mofwe into the Kalungwishi River, which flows into Lake Mweru. However, at the junction of the Kalungwishi and the Mofwe, the elevation is 942 m but the surface of the lake is at only 932 m. It is evident that the Kalungwishi overflows in the rainy season into Mweru Wantipa, but perhaps not vice versa, though one report in 1931 after very heavy rains reported a flood from the Mofwe into the Kalungwishi. Most of the time, though, Mweru Wantipa has no outlet and forms an isolated river basin.

== Lake extent ==
Around 2005, Lake Mweru Wantipa's main north-east to south-west axis was about 65 km long and it was about 20 km wide, but a narrow branch extends roughly 30 km east from the northern end, giving a surface area of about 1500 km². In the south-east at Kampinda, a peninsula divides off a swampy inlet containing the Chimbwe Pools and a lagoon called Lake Cheshi. However at various times in the recent past it has been reported to be not a lake but a swamp with hardly any open water surface, and even to be a plain of dried out mud (littered with fish scales and bones, and the skeletons of dead crocodiles and hippos). These variations in open water surface occur not just within a single dry and rainy season cycle, but over years or decades. For instance it was reported as being a lake in 1890, 1897, 1911, 1919 and 1938, but a swamp in 1892, 1900–11, 1912–19, and 1922; and as having dried out around 1916. Its greatest depth has been reported as 5 m, but at times may be less than 1 m deep over most of its surface.

The salinity also shows long term variation, it was reported as being freshwater in 1929 and 1939, but saline in 1949.

== Factors determining water level and salinity ==
While rainfall is the main factor, this may not be the complete story. Blockage of the Mofwe and of the rivers draining into Mweru Wantipa by papyrus and the growth of rushes may be part of the answer. It may also be that the effects of dry years may be delayed for a few years by the release of groundwater from surrounding hills into dambos which flow into the lake.

== Natural resources and environmental pressures ==
Lake Mweru Wantipa's fishery has been productive in the past but has been depleted in recent years. The lake supports a large population of hippopotamus and crocodiles. Except for birds and waterfowl, the wildlife on land and in the marshes, once extensive, has been reduced despite the existence of the Mweru Wantipa National Park. The park lies mainly on the lake's western shore but covers the lake surface, much of the marshes and part of the southern shore. The lake is only a few kilometres from the DR Congo border on its northern side and wars and conflicts in that country have caused many thousands of refugees to enter the district at Kaputa, putting pressure on resources. Most of the refugees have been moved to camps in Kawambwa and Mporokoso districts before repatriation.

== Settlements and roads ==
The main centre of population on the lake is the town of Kaputa, which also forms an administrative district of the Northern Province.

At one time the principal road serving the lake was the one from Mporokoso to its south-east shore where there was a ferry at Bulaya, but that has deteriorated and now the main highway is the one from Lake Mweru along the western and northern shores to Kaputa.
