= Mbala District =

Coordinates: 9°00′S 31°00′E

- District
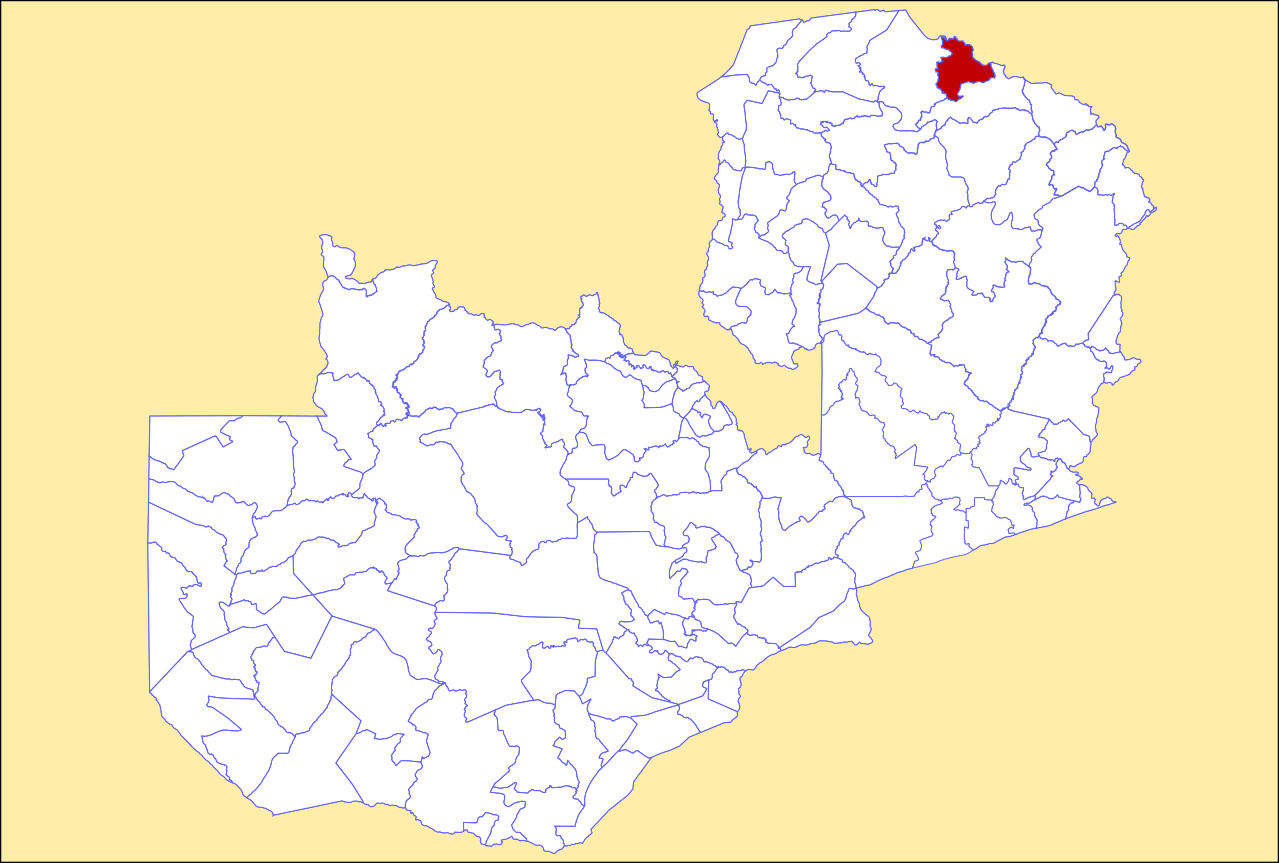
- District location in Zambia
- Country: Zambia
- Province: Northern Province
- Capital: Mbala

Area
  - Total: 3,346.3 km^{2} (1,292.0 sq mi)

Population (2022)
  - Total: 161,595
  - Density: 48.291/km^{2} (125.07/sq mi)
- Time zone: UTC+2 (CAT)

Mbala District is a district of Zambia, located in Northern Province. The capital lies at Mbala. As of the 2022 Zambian Census, the district had a population of 161,595 people.

== History ==
Established in 1890 by the name Tanganyika District under Central African Authority (CAA), It later came under the British South Africa Company’s administration. The district's name changed to Mbala in 1968, derived from the "Imbala," a type of spotted bushbuck found near Lake Chila. In 1996, Mbala was upgraded to municipal status.

== Geography ==
Mbala has diverse altitudes, with the lowest areas near the Great Rift Valley lying at 400 meters above sea level, while the highest point is Nsunzu Mountain, at 2,067 meters. The district experiences a temperate climate, with temperatures ranging from 5-7°C during the cold season to 27°C in the hotter months. Annual rainfall averages 1,200 mm.
