= Mungwi District =

Coordinates: 9°55′S 31°44′E

- District
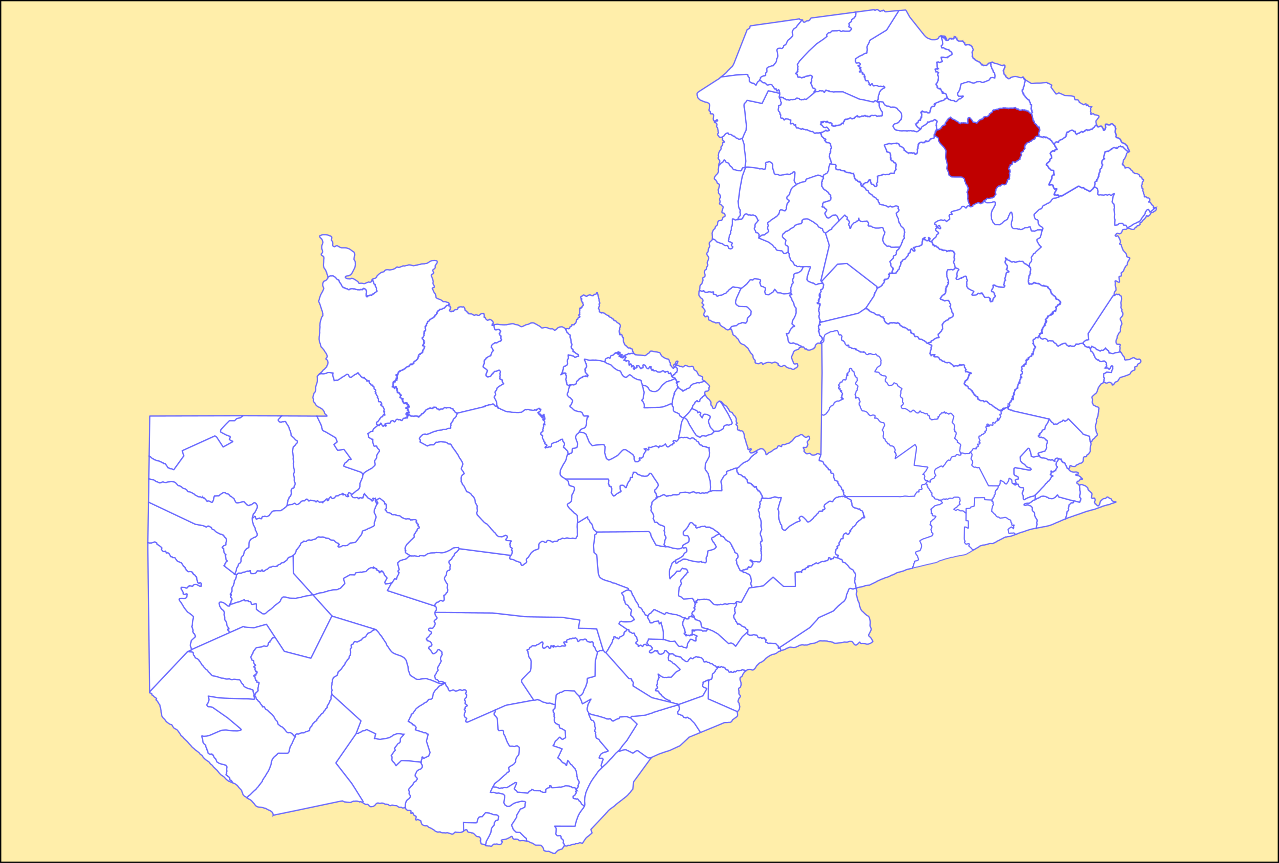
- District location in Zambia
- Country: Zambia
- Province: Northern Province
- Capital: Mungwi

Area
  - Total: 9,758.7 km^{2} (3,767.9 sq mi)

Population (2022)
  - Total: 205,096
  - Density: 21.017/km^{2} (54.433/sq mi)
- Time zone: UTC+2 (CAT)

Mungwi District is a district of Zambia, located in Northern Province. The capital lies at Mungwi. As of the 2022 Zambian Census, the district had a population of 205,096 people.

== Climate ==
The Mungwi District experiences a tropical climate and falls within agro-ecological region III of Zambia, receiving more than 1,000 mm of rainfall annually. The rainy season typically lasts from November to April. During the growing season, which spans 140 to 170 days, temperatures range from 19°C to 27°C, with June and July being the coolest months, averaging 16°C. The hottest period is from August to October, with temperatures peaking around 32°C.

== Hydrology ==
The Mungwi District has abundant water resources, including the Chambeshi River, one of Zambia's four major rivers. The district has a total of 81 streams, of which 50 are perennial and 31 are seasonal. The streams drain into: Kalungu, Luchindashi, Ntumba, Luchewe, and Mabula which also serve as sources of water for domestic use, livestock, and limited irrigation, with rice cultivation being prominent along the Chambeshi floodplains.
