= Kaputa District =

Coordinates: 8°45′S 29°50′E

- District
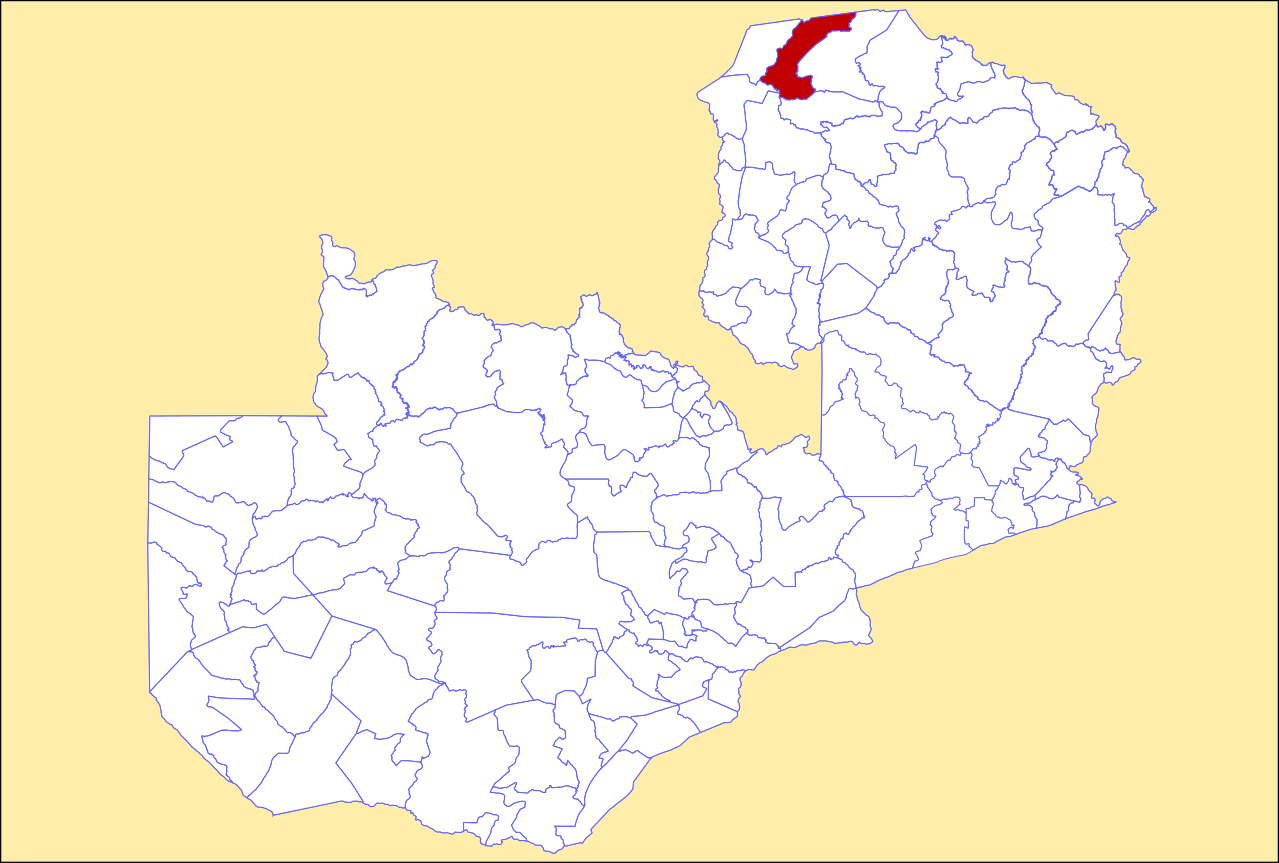
- District location in Zambia
- Country: Zambia
- Province: Northern Province
- Capital: Kaputa

Area
  - Total: 5,035.8 km^{2} (1,944.3 sq mi)

Population (2022)
  - Total: 102,854
  - Density: 20.425/km^{2} (52.899/sq mi)
- Time zone: UTC+2 (CAT)

Kaputa District is a district of Zambia, located in Northern Province. The capital lies at Kaputa. As of the 2022 Zambian Census, the district had a population of 102,854 people.

== History ==
In March 2020, the district experienced severe flooding at Mofwe crossing point on the Mporokoso to Mununga road.

== Infrastructure ==
=== Education ===
In May 2017, Kaputa Boarding Secondary School built for an estimated ZMW 44 million (US$ 4.6 million) was opened to cater for 392 pupils.

=== Utilities ===
In April 2022, the Kaputa Water and Sanitation Project built for ZMW 161 million (US$ 9.5 million) by Tomorrow Investments Limited was commissioned by the Country's Vice President Mutale Nalumango for improved access to clean and safe water supply for the residents in the district.

== Economy ==
=== Agriculture ===
In 2020, farmers in Kaputa cultivated 2,362 hectares of rice with a yield of 2,347 metric tonnes. The Ministry of Agriculture in Kaputa has estimated that over 2,800 hectares of rice has been cultivated for the 2020 farming season.
