= Mpulungu District =

Coordinates: 8°57′S 30°47′E

- District
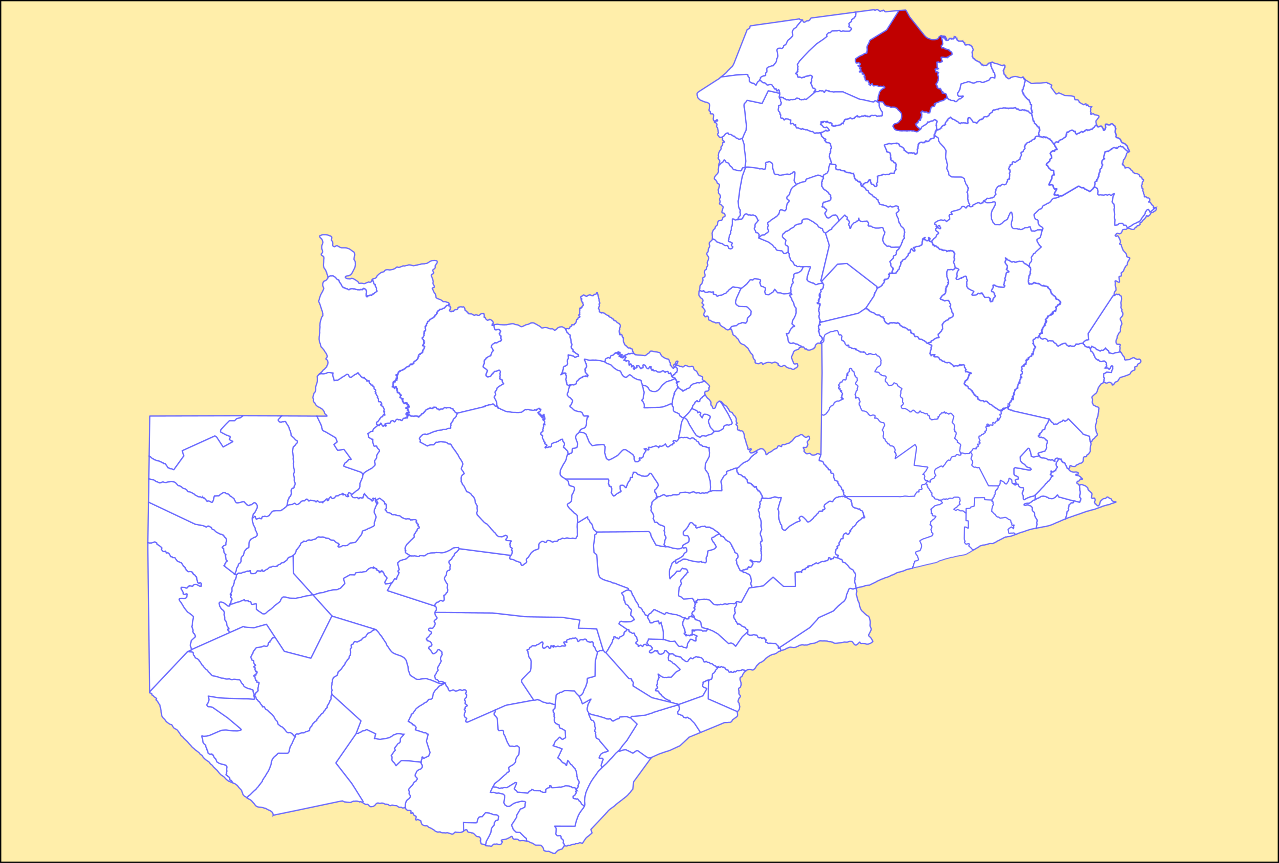
- District location in Zambia
- Country: Zambia
- Province: Northern Province
- Capital: Mpulungu

Area
  - Total: 10,074.1 km^{2} (3,889.6 sq mi)

Population (22)
  - Total: 153,564
  - Density: 15.2434/km^{2} (39.4803/sq mi)
- Time zone: UTC+2 (CAT)

Mpulungu District is a district of Zambia, located in Northern Province. The capital lies at Mpulungu. As of the 2022 Zambian Census, the district had a population of 153,564 people.

== Climate ==
Mpulungu's altitude ranges from 800 to 1,250 meters above sea level, with some areas, such as the Iyendwe Valley, sitting at lower elevations. The district experiences warm temperatures, with averages ranging between 24°C and 34°C. The hottest period occurs between October and December, when temperatures can reach 29°C. Cooler temperatures are recorded from June to July, with minimum temperatures dropping to 20°C. 4

Mpulungu falls within the agro-ecological zone that receives annual rainfall ranging from 1,000 to 1,200 mm, and its climate is classified as tropical. The district has distinct seasons: cool and dry from May to July, dry and hot from August to October, and wet and hot from November to April.
