= Northern Province, Zambia =

Province of Zambia

Coordinates: 11°00′S 31°00′E

Northern
- Province
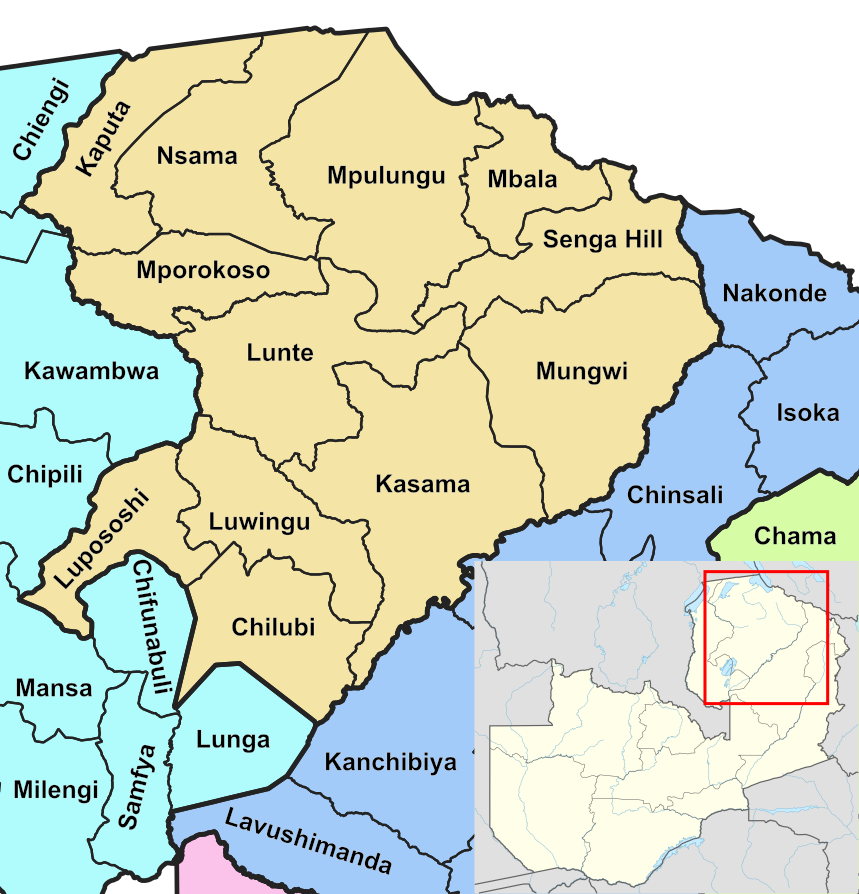
- Map of the Northern Province showing its districts.
- Country: Zambia
- Capital: Kasama

Government
  - Type: Provincial Administration
  - Provincial Minister: Leonard Mbao

Area
  - Total: 77,650 km^{2} (29,980 sq mi)

Population (2022 census)
  - Total: 1,623,853
  - Density: 20.91/km^{2} (54.16/sq mi)
- Time zone: UTC+2
- ISO 3166 code: ZM-05
- HDI (2018): 0.546 low · 6th
- Website: www.nor.gov.zm

Northern Province is one of Zambia's ten provinces. It covers approximately one-sixth of Zambia in land area. The provincial capital is Kasama. The province is made up of 12 districts, namely Kasama District (the provincial capital), Chilubi District, Kaputa District, Luwingu District, Mbala District, Mporokoso District, Mpulungu District, Mungwi District, Nsama District, Lupososhi District, Lunte District and Senga Hill District. Currently, only Kasama and Mbala have attained municipal council status, while the rest are still district councils. It is widely considered to be the heartland of the Bemba, one of the largest tribes in Zambia.

Every district of the Muchinga Province was previously part of the Northern Province. President Michael Sata decided in 2012 to create the new province by taking the south-eastern districts of Northern Province.

Notable landmarks in Northern Province include Lake Tanganyika, Lake Bangweulu and the corresponding wetlands, Lake Mweru-wa-Ntipa, and a number of waterfalls including Lumangwe Falls, Kabwelume Falls, Chishimba Falls and Kalambo Falls.

Efforts are being made by the Zambian government, along with a number of non-governmental organizations, to increase the visibility of the many natural and historical treasures in the Northern Province. Tourism has proven an effective way to bring economic growth in other parts of Zambia, i.e. Livingstone and Victoria Falls. However, a lack of infrastructure along the vast distances between major points of interest makes visiting this part of the country difficult.

Northern Province shares borders with two other provinces - Muchinga and Luapula, and also with two countries - the Democratic Republic of Congo in the north and Tanzania in the north-east.

== Geography ==
The Northern Province lies mainly on the great southern African plateau, which has been uplifted to an elevation around 1200 metres above sea level. Rift valleys extend clockwise around the province from the north-west to the south. These rift valleys are sometimes outside the borders of the province, as in the case of the Luapula-Mweru valley to the north-west and the Lake Rukwa and Lake Malawi rift valleys to the north east; but the escarpments of the Lake Mweru-wa-Ntipa-Lake Tanganyika rifts in the north, and the Luangwa Valley rift in the east and south-east are just within the province. In places the rift valleys have pushed up highlands: around Kambole and Mbala above Lake Tanganyika, (the Muchinga escarpment above the Luangwa valley, and the highlands along north-eastern border with Tanzania and Malawi which culminate in the Mafinga Hills and Nyika Plateau. These are now in Muchinga Province)

These features produce a diverse landscape that varies and poses different challenges, particularly to highway construction, as one moves from one part to another. The Mafinga Hills, which include the highest point in the country at 2301 metres above sea level, once formed a formidable barrier between the Northern and Eastern Provinces that few but the best 4-wheel drive vehicles dared to cross, especially during the rainy season. The shortest road link between the two provinces is now eased by the rehabilitation of the Isoka-Muyombe Road, which traverses their lower slopes.

Rivers, streams and dambos crisscross the province in profusion, posing yet another great challenge to easy movement of people, goods, and services. The most prominent river on the eastern side is the Luangwa, which has its source in the Mafinga Hills, and which has no road across its valley for a distance of about 800 km. Africa's second longest river, the Congo, has its source in Northern Province via its longest tributary, the Chambeshi River, which rises in the hills south-west of Mbala and divides the province diagonally as it meanders to Lake Bangweulu in the south-west. During times of very heavy rains, these rivers, particularly the Chambeshi and Luangwa, spread across floodplains often several kilometers wide, and create large tracts of both seasonal and permanent lagoons and swamps along their valleys. The Chambeshi feeds the largest wetlands of all, the Bangweulu Wetlands and floodplain in Mpika and Chilubi Districts, known for its Lechwe and birds among other wildlife.

The province also contains three large natural lakes - Lake Bangweulu and its adjacent wetlands (shared with Luapula Province), Lake Mweru-wa-Ntipa in Kaputa District, and the vast Lake Tanganyika in the north, which forms part of Zambia's border with DR Congo and Tanzania.

Climate data for Northern (Zambia)
Month	Jan	Feb	Mar	Apr	May	Jun	Jul	Aug	Sep	Oct	Nov	Dec	Year
Record high °C (°F)	26.3 (79.3)	26.8 (80.2)	26.8 (80.2)	26.5 (79.7)	26 (79)	24.9 (76.8)	24.9 (76.8)	26.9 (80.4)	29.8 (85.6)	30.9 (87.6)	28.9 (84.0)	26.7 (80.1)	30.9 (87.6)
Mean daily maximum °C (°F)	19.7 (67.5)	19.9 (67.8)	20.2 (68.4)	20.2 (68.4)	18.9 (66.0)	17.2 (63.0)	17.1 (62.8)	18.9 (66.0)	21.8 (71.2)	23.1 (73.6)	21.6 (70.9)	20.1 (68.2)	23.1 (73.6)
Mean daily minimum °C (°F)	16.1 (61.0)	16.2 (61.2)	16.1 (61.0)	15.2 (59.4)	12.5 (54.5)	9.6 (49.3)	9.3 (48.7)	11 (52)	13.8 (56.8)	15.9 (60.6)	16.4 (61.5)	16.2 (61.2)	9.3 (48.7)
Average precipitation mm (inches)	287 (11.3)	237 (9.3)	220 (8.7)	93 (3.7)	11 (0.4)	0 (0)	0 (0)	0 (0)	2 (0.1)	19 (0.7)	128 (5.0)	269 (10.6)	1,269 (50.0)
Source 1:
Source 2:

=== National parks and other wildlife areas ===
The below are national parks and other wildlife areas of the Northern Province.

- Nsumbu National Park – adjacent to Lake Tanganyika
- Lake Mweru-wa-Ntipa National Park
- Lake Tanganyika – a great diversity of fish as well as crocodile, hippo and aquatic birds.
- Bangweulu Wetlands
- Isangano National Park

== Demographics ==
Historical population
Year	Pop.	±%
1990	580,545	—
2000	809,400	+39.4%
2010	1,105,824	+36.6%
2022	1,623,853	+46.8%
Sources: 1964-69: 1980-2000: 2010:

As per the 2010 Zambian census, Northern Province had a population of 1,105,824 accounting for 8.47% of the total Zambian population of 13,092,666. There were 546,851 males and 558,973 females, making the sex ratio to 1,022 for every 1,000 males, compared to the national average of 1,028. The literacy rate stood at 61.00% against a national average of 70.2%. The rural population constituted 81.68%, while the urban population was 18.32%. The total area of the province was 77,650 km^{2} and the population density was 14.20 per km^{2}. The population density during 2000 Zambian census stood at 14.20. The decadal population growth of the province was 3.20%. The median age in the province at the time of marriage was 20.1. The average household size was 5.0, with the families headed by females being 3.9 and 5.3 for families headed by men. The total eligible voters in the province was 67.40%. The unemployment rate of the province was 6.30%. The total fertility rate was 7.1, complete birth rate was 6.5, crude birth rate was 41.0, child women population at birth was 880, general fertility rate was 182, gross reproduction rate was 2.8 and net reproduction rate was 2.1. The total labour force constituted 60.20% of the total population. Out of the labour force,66.9% were men and 54.1% women. The annual growth rate of labour force was 3.4%. Bemba was the most spoken language with 69.20% speaking it. Albinism is a condition where the victims do not have any pigment in their skin, hair or eyes. The total population in the province with the condition stood at 2,571. The life expectancy at birth stood at 46 compared to the national average of 51.

== Languages and culture ==
Northern Province has a number of tribal groups speaking different languages and dialects. However, the most common language is Icibemba, spoken by the Bemba people of Chinsali, Kasama, Mungwi and parts of Mporokoso and Luwingu districts. Other prominent languages include Icinamwanga, spoken by the Namwanga people of Nakonde and Isoka districts, ChiTumbuka, spoken by the Tumbuka people of Lundazi, and Icimambwe, spoken by the Mambwe of Mbala district. Despite its size and the diversity of languages and dialects, the people of Northern Province generally share a common culture.

Each of these tribes has its own traditional leadership headed by either a paramount or senior chief assisted by junior chiefs and village headmen. The most prominent of the chiefs in the province is Chitimukulu, Paramount Chief of the Bemba. Others include Senior Chief Kopa of the Bisa, Senior Chief Muyombe of the Tumbuka, Senior Chieftainess Nawaitwika of the Namwanga, Senior Chief Tafuna of the Lungu and Senior Chief Nsokolo of the Mambwe.

== Economy ==
Profession	% of working population
Agriculture, Forestry & Fishing (by Industry)	16.50
Community, Social and Personal	5.90
Construction	6.00
Electricity, Gas, and water	3.60
Financial & Insurance activities	1.10
Hotels and Restaurants	6.10
Manufacturing	7.30
Mining & Quarrying	0.80
Transportation and Storage	6.80
Wholesale & Retail Trade	8.30

Northern Province has no industry at all, and its primary economic activity is agriculture. The most commonly grown crops are maize, millet, sorghum, groundnuts, beans, and rice. Most of the food produced is consumed within the province, though a small percentage is bought by traders for resale along the railway.

Despite having a total area of 147,826 square kilometers, the province has approximately only 900 kilometers of tarmac, a large portion of which is in dire need of rehabilitation. The rest are gravel roads, the majority of which are almost impassable.

There are very few farmers who grow crops on a commercial basis in the province. Most of the people are peasant subsistence farmers using the traditional "slash and burn" shifting cultivation locally known as "chitemene", and are barely able to even produce enough to feed themselves. There is also some commercial fishing being done on Lake Tanganyika by established fishing companies in Mpulungu. Most of the fish caught is taken for sale in Lusaka and the Copperbelt on refrigerated trucks. Fishing is also done by small-scale fishermen, who sell their small catches to local traders and others who resell the fish in the nearby towns of Mbala and Kasama.

Mpulungu, 208 km from Kasama, is Zambia's only port, and its harbour is generally used to export bulky goods, such as sugar and cement, to Rwanda and the Democratic Republic of the Congo. In turn, Zambia also imports Kapenta (small, dried fish) and other merchandise from these two countries, as well as Tanzania, through the same port.

The total area of crops planted during the year 2014 in the province was 191,104.56 hectares which constituted 10.07% of the total area cultivated in Zambia. The net production stood at 351,249 metric tonnes, which formed 8.62% of the total agricultural production in the country. Mixed beans were the major crop in the province with 31,898 metric tonnes, constituting 51.66% of the national output.

== Administration ==
Districts of Northern Province (2016)

Provincial administration is headed by the Permanent Secretary, a minister appointed by the President and there are ministries of central government for each province. There is a Deputy Permanent Secretary, heads of government departments and civil servants at the provincial level. Northern Province is divided into twelve districts, namely, Chilubi District, Kaputa District, Kasama District, Luwingu District, Mbala District, Mporokoso District, Mpulungu District, Mungwi District, Lupososhi District, Senga Hill District, Lunte District and Nsama District. All the district headquarters are the same as the district names. There are twelve councils in the province, each of which is headed by an elected representative, called councilor. Each councilor holds office for three years. The administrative staff of the council is selected based on Local Government Service Commission from within or outside the district. The office of the provincial government is located in each of the district headquarters and has provincial local government officers and auditors. Each council is responsible for raising and collecting local taxes and the budgets of the council are audited and submitted every year after the annual budget. The elected members of the council do not draw salaries, but are paid allowances from the council. Northern is a predominantly rural district and hence there are no city or municipal councils. The government stipulates 63 different functions for the councils with the majority of them being infrastructure management and local administration. Councils are mandated to maintain each of their community centres, zoos, local parks, drainage system, playgrounds, cemeteries, caravan sites, libraries, museums and art galleries. They also work along with specific government departments for helping in agriculture, conservation of natural resources, postal service, establishing and maintaining hospitals, schools and colleges. The councils prepare schemes that encourage community participation.

== Education ==
HIV infected & AIDS deaths
Year	HIV infected	AIDS deaths
1985	539	107
1990	6,529	207
1995	32,452	1,476
2000	56,050	4,166
2005	65,020	6,418
2010	65,787	6,958

Northern Province has twenty-four high schools. Twenty-one are run by the government, while four are grant-aided (managed by the Catholic Church and the United Church of Zambia with financial support from the government).

All the government high schools run from Grade 10 to 12, while the four managed by the church run from Grade 8 to 12. Six of them are single-sex schools, while the rest admit both girls and boys. There are eight schools that enroll boarding pupils only, while all the others enroll both boarding and day pupils.

As of 2004, the province had 1,208 basic schools, 26 high schools and the number of school children out of school in ages between 7 and 15 stood at1,208 . The unemployment rate was 7 percent and the general unemployment rate for youth stood at 12 percent as of 2008. The province had 40 doctors as of 2005. There were 331 Malaria incidences for every 1,000 people in the province as of 2005 and there were 6,958 AIDS death as of 2010.

== See also ==
- Bibliography of the history of Zambia
