= Bangweulu wetlands conservation areas =

Wetland near Lake Bangweulu, Zambia

Bangweulu Wetlands
- Bangweulu Swamps
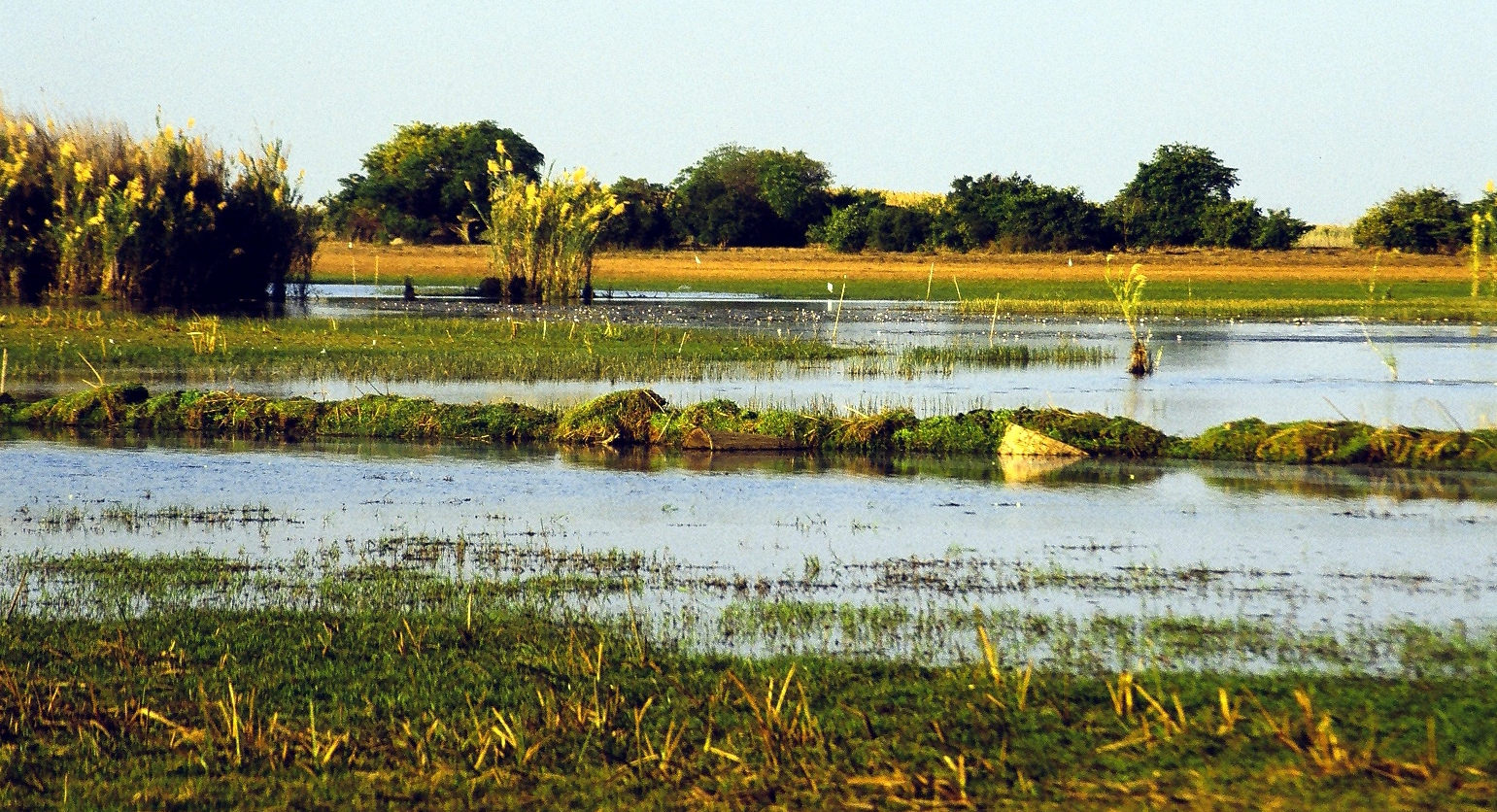
- View of the wetlands

- Location within Zambia
- Coordinates: 11°36′S 30°05′E
- Area: 9,850 km^{2} (3,800 sq mi)

Ramsar Wetland
- Designated: 28 August 1991
- Reference no.: 531

The Bangweulu Wetlands conservation areas cover the wetlands of Lake Bangweulu and its surrounds in northern Zambia. Other names applied to parts of the wetlands are Bangweulu Swamps (papyrus swamps) and Bangweulu Flats (grassy floodplains).

The wetlands have been designated as one of the world's most important by UNESCO and the Ramsar Convention, as well as an "Important Bird Area" by BirdLife International. Apart from agreement to maintain the ecology of the Ramsar site, there are seven protected areas covering the northeast, east, and south of the wetlands, as shown in the satellite image-based map:

- Luwingu Game Management Area (GMA)
- Isangano National Park (NP)
- Chambeshi Game Management Area
- Bangweulu Game Management Area
- Kafinda Game Management Area
- Kasanka National Park
- Kalasa Mukoso Game Management Area

An eighth protected area, Lavushi Manda National Park, lies outside the Bangweulu wetlands but is contiguous with Bangweulu Game Management Area. However that National Park was established for a different reason, to conserve the Lavushi Mountains and surrounds.

== Overview ==
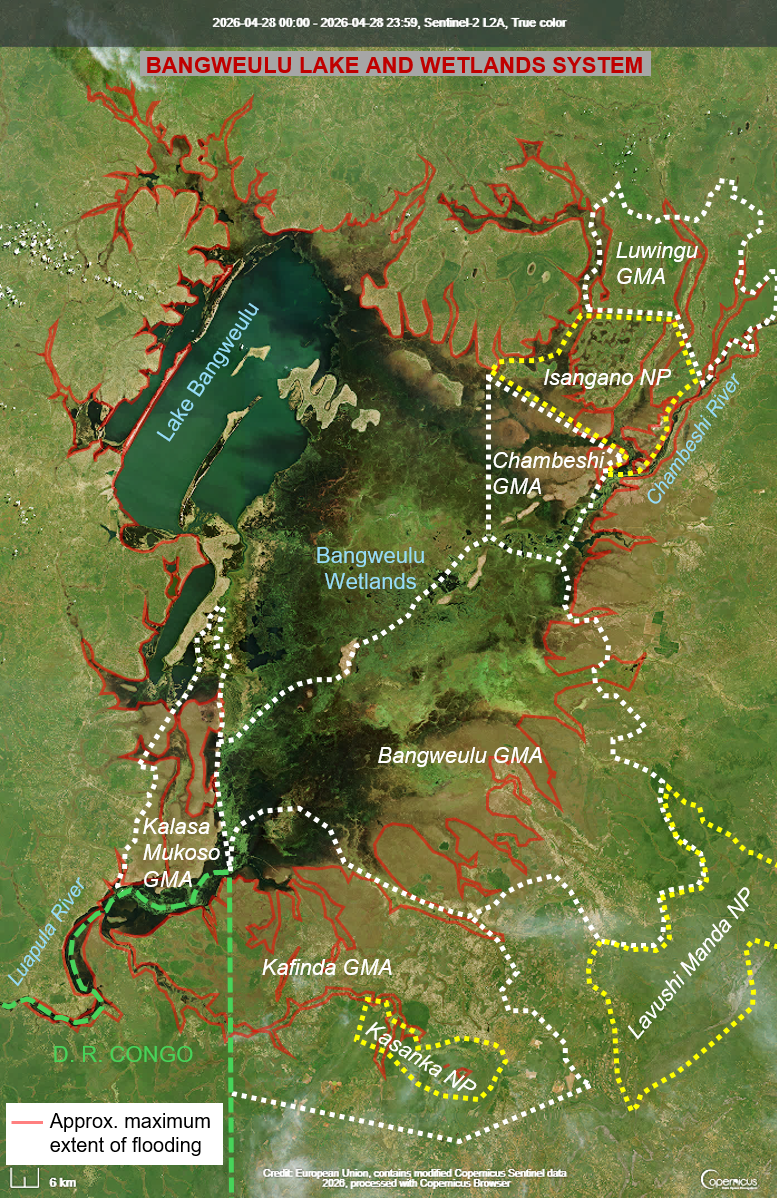
Satellite image-based map of Lake Bangweulu and the Bangweulu wetlands conservation areas (NP: National Park, GMA: Game Management Areas). The red line marks the approximate limit of the wetlands as the maximum extent of flooding. The Ramsar site boundary is similar but its area is a little smaller.

Bangweulu means "where the water meets the sky", referring to them appearing to merge, as seen when the colour of the water surface is the same as the sky, so the flat horizon all but disappears. This is seen most prominently on the lake in the late afternoon in the dry season when the water is still and the sky is hazy.

The Bangweulu lake and wetlands system is located in 11 districts of Zambia's Luapula, Northern, Muchinga and Central Provinces, in that order of greatest to smallest area. A small portion of the wetlands is also in the Democratic Republic of the Congo. Provincial and district boundaries (which have seen changes in the last twenty years) cut across protected area boundaries, with some communities being uncertain where they lie. In addition, enforcement of regulations is under-resourced in many areas. This adds complexity to administration and management of the system, as detailed in the Isangano National Park article.

The system's largest tributary is the Chambeshi River coming in from the northeast, and its only outlet is the Luapula River in the southwest, making the system part of the upper Congo River basin.

The climate of northern Zambia has a wet season from October/November to April/May, with a dry season in the remainder of the year. Annual rainfall averages 1200 mm over the lake and wetlands. Water level in the system is determined by the excess of rainfall over evaporation, and the rate of drainage by the Luapula, which is influenced by how much floating papyrus vegetation ('sudd') blocks the river channels. There is no distinct clear channel for the Luapula connecting its exit from the main Lake Bangweulu at 11°26′S 29°49′E to its exit from the swamps west of Tuta Bridge (12°07′S 29°50′E). Similarly, the Chambeshi does not have a clear channel through the permanent swamps, and there is no obvious confluence of the two rivers, though it maybe indicated arbitrarily on some maps. Water flow occurs slowly throughout the swamps.

The Bangweulu system is located on one of the flattest areas of Zambia. The water surface is at an average elevation of 1140 m, compared with the highest point on land in Samfya town of about 1210 m and about 1179 m on the largest island, Chilubi. The seasonal difference between high and low water is of the order of 1–2 m but the extreme flatness of the topography means that the edge of the flood slowly advances and retreats by up to 45 km over the floodplains, and the floodwater does not appreciably erode the terrain, nor deposit debris or a great deal of silt. It also means that the boundary of the wetland is highly variable, both between seasons and different years. The total maximum area of the lake and wetlands varies roughly between 15,000–16,000 km^{2}, with the main lake being more consistently about 3,000 km^{2} of that. So the maximum area of the wetlands minus the main lake varies roughly between 12,000–13,000 km^{2}.

== Ecological zones in the wetlands ==
=== Lakes and lagoons ===
In the wettest part of the wetlands, the swamps, there are many small lagoons and lakes, which tend to be shallower than the main lake, and with more floating vegetation. Another difference is that waves powered by prevailing easterlies are non-existent or smaller than on the main lake. These open bodies of water are scattered throughout the swamps and in the floodplains of the larger rivers.

=== Swamps ===
==== Papyrus swamps ====
These are unforested swamps up to 2 m deep dominated by floating papyrus (Cyperus papyrus), and Vossia grass which can also form floating rafts, buoyant enough for fishing communities to set up temporary camps upon them, as well as providing refuge for birds and animals. Refuges were especially significant in the past when there was a lion population, and though lions will hunt in swamps and floodwater, they tend to avoid water deeper than about a metre.

The permanent swamp area is concentrated in the centre of the system, southeast of the lake, and is much larger than the open lake surface. A vast network of narrow changeable channels through the papyrus is created by river flow, hippos, and human inhabitants who build permanent villages on the many islands and connect them by long straight cuts through the papyrus, for which narrow dugout canoes are the ideal transport. A few wider cuts have been made to accommodate larger boats, or in an effort to improve flow and reduce the depth of the flood in order to allow rice cultivation, but over time they tend to silt up or are closed up by the floating rafts of vegetation. The papyrus is taller and thicker adjacent to the natural flowing channels and wider cut channels than it is in further away from channels. This is attributed to flowing water bringing more nutrients in solution.

==== Mushitu forested wetland ====
Mushitu is the Bemba word for a patch of evergreen or semi-evergreen forest growing on permanently wet soil or swamp, such as is found at springs and seepages, usually in dambos, and along streams and rivers. The patches are thick including the understory and ground level and the trees are tall. The patches generally cover no more than a couple of hectares. The mushitu vegetation species are relicts of rainforest from a wetter time, and include Podocarpus, Ocotea, Parinari, Canarium, Syzygium, and Xylopia. They host a distinctive insect and bird fauna, as well as providing refuge for small entelope such as duikers. Good examples are found in Kasanka National Park.

=== Dambos ===
Dambos are characteristic of the Central African plateau as headwaters and upper river drainage, where they have a branching (dendritic) form. They also form the margin between permanently dry land and swamps or river channels. They are waterlogged in the wet season and open water surfaces will appear in some areas typically along draingae lines in the centre or close to river channels. When dambos dry out in the dry season, grey or black soil appears compared to the well-drained red soil of dry land, and some wet lines of drainage stay throughout. Dambos are often referred to as sponges, soaking up rainwater in the wet season and releasing it in the dry, and springs can be found in them, but they have a more complex relationship than that with groundwater and aquifers. They differ from flooded grassland by having groundwater seeping out in the dry season after floodwaters have subsided, and they have more sedges.

Vegetation on dambos is mainly grasses and sedges, and though they appear to provide plenty of grazing, this can be misleading. Dambos generally do not support large herds of antelope, buffalo, or cattle except at the end of the dry season, neither are they used much for crops except rice, and vegetable gardens in the dry season.

Headwater dambos occur interspersed among the dry land that surrounds the Bangweulu system. Fluvial (river) dambos occur along the rivers that flow into the system, and also along the Luapula where it flows out.

=== Grassy floodplains ===
The floodplains of the system's rivers and lakes are flooded in the wet season to a depth from a few centrimetres up to about a metre, and then they dry out in the dry season. The cycle of flooding and drying out suits grasses more than most other plants and in Bangweulu a dozen or more grasses have adapted to different depths and duration of flooding. One of the most tolerant is Vossia, an aquatic grass which will actually grow in permanent swamps, creating floating rafts of vegetation with papyrus. Hyperrhennia is an example of a species that grows at the 'top' (highest part) of the floodplain, next to permanently dry land, where flooding is of short duration and shallowest depth. An example of a grass in between these is Oryza, tolerating a moderate duration and depth, growing in the middle band of the floodplain. This Vossia –Oryza–Hyperrhenia sequence is common on floodplains through Africa, including Bangweulu. Plenty of other sequences exist. The neat sequence is complicated by Bangweulu grassy floodplains also being a mosaic of different grass communities.

=== Permanently dry land in the Bangweulu area ===
Miombo woodland, the dominant vegetation of permanently dry land on the northern Zambia plateau, surrounds the wetland on ground higher than the floodplain, and grows on islands in the lake and wetlands. Many birds and animals move between wetlands and woodland, such as elephant, buffalo, and certain antelope, as well as warthogs and bushpigs, and their predators: lions, leopards, African painted dogs, and hyenas.

On the floodplain, anthills (termite mounds, technically) are numerous over large areas of floodplain, at a density of about 3 mounds per hectare for large ones, with many of those inactive. The larger ones up to 30 m in dameter and 6 m high are hundreds of years old. They remain above the water level during the flood season and support trees and bushes, and some support dwellings. Black lechwe have been observed resting on them and they also provide nesting, resting and vantage perches for many birds including fish eagles and other birds of prey.

== Conservation ==
The main government responsibility for conservation in Zambia lies with the Department of National Parks and Wildlife in the Ministry of Tourism, with the Department of Fisheries in the Ministry of Fisheries and Livestock, and the Zambia Environmental Management Agency (ZEMA) and the water-resources authorities also have statutory roles affecting wetlands. In addition Provincial and District administrations play a part through their development committees. The following types and levels of protection are given to different areas of the Bangweulu system.

=== Bangweulu Swamps Ramsar wetlands site ===
In the Ramsar documentation the name used is 'Bangweulu Swamps' to mean the greater lake and wetlands system, not just swampland. Designation as a Wetland of International Importance under the Ramsar Convention does not give the entire site the legal status of a national park or GMA. Rather, it commits Zambia to maintaining the ecological character of the wetland and promoting its sustainable or "wise" use. Those parts of the Ramsar site not covered by a GMA or national park have some statutory protections under Zambia's general environmental, water-resource and related legislation. The Environmental Management Act 2011, for example, recognises wetlands as environmentally sensitive areas and regulates activities that may damage them.

=== Bangweulu fishery (lake and wetlands) ===
Lake Bangweulu and its embayments Lake Chifunauli and Lake Wallilupe, and smaller lakes in the swamps, are not covered by national parks or game management areas but fisheries laws and regulations apply. Commercial fishing requires a licence, fishing is prohibited during an annual closed season from December to February, while regulations restrict net types and mesh sizes and prohibit certain methods such as driving fish into static nets or traps.

An FAO study found widespread non-compliance: The regulations are not agreed with, particularly on mesh size, and the Fisheries Department has neither the means nor the manpower to enforce the regulations other than through sporadic patrols. In 2022 the Minister of Fisheries and Livestock told the National Assembly that fish stocks in Zambia's natural waters had declined and specifically confirmed serious depletion in Lake Bangweulu.

=== Game management areas ===
Zambia’s Game Management Areas (GMAs) are established under the Zambia Wildlife Act 2015 for the conservation and sustainable use of wildlife. Unlike national parks, GMAs are multiple-use areas in which local communities live, farm and use natural resources. Wildlife hunting may be permitted under licences, quotas and concessions, while land use and development are regulated through management plans. Community Resource Boards provide for local participation in wildlife management and sharing of benefits derived from wildlife resources.

The effectiveness of wildlife protection in a GMA depends on the members of the community resource boards, the local district administration, and their resources for inspection and enforcement of regulations.

==== Bangweulu Game Management Area ====
This GMA, which is also referred to as 'Bangweulu Wetlands' has an area of 6470 km^{2} comprising permanent swamps, grassy floodplains and dambos in the southwest of the wetlands, and also includes miombo woodland stretching as far as Lavushi Manda National Park. Despite being the largest GMA it is nevertheless only just over a third of the whole Bangweulu system. It has the largest area of swamps of the GMAs, but a larger area of swamps, those closest to the southeastern shore of Lake Walilupe and to the east of Chilubi Island, are not in a GMA or national park. Bangweulu GMA lies in Lunga District of Luapula Province and Kanchibiya and Lavushimanda Districts of Muchinga Province and has a population of about 50,000 who support themselves mainly by fishing.

In 2008, African Parks began managing Bangweulu GMA with the establishment of the Bangweulu Wetland Management Board, which includes representation by African Parks, the Zambia Wildlife Authority, and six community members. Funding was secured by African Parks and the United Nations Development Programme (UNDP). Through this partnership, African Parks is responsible for all management and operations of the GMA, including conservation law enforcement, community development, biodiversity conservation, infrastructure and economic development. This public-private and community partnership is part of the Community Partnership Park concept created by the Ministry of Lands, Natural Resources and Environment Protection and Zambia Wildlife Authority's "Reclassification and Effective Management of National Protected Areas System" project. According to UNDP, the project seeks to "improve the management of existing Protected Areas through law enforcement and to propose new protected area categories to ensure the community owns and manages the natural resources in a sustainable manner".

Past partners supporting Bangweulu Wetlands include the Bangweulu Wetlands Management Board and Kasanka Trust; current major funders supporting Bangweuu include WWF-The Netherlands, WWF-Zambia, and the Zambian Department of National Parks and Wildlife, according to African Parks. The Working for Water Project's mission is to survey and protect Africa's major wetlands, including Bangweulu, the Niger and Okavango deltas, and Sudd and Zambezi. The University of Cape Town's Percy FitzPatrick Institute of African Ornithology has worked to create conservation plans for the shoebill. African Parks and Fondation Segré's "Bangweulu Wetlands Wildlife Reintroduction Project" was initiated in 2016 and seeks to "recreate an ecologically viable protected area with the capacity to become sustainable".

Tourism facilities in the GMA include Shoebill Island Camp at Chikuni, Nkondo Tented Camp at Chiundaponde, or Nsobe Campsite near Ngungwa.

On 15 October 2014, a new 15-year agreement for the management of the GMA was signed by ZAWA, African Parks and the six Community Resource Boards that make up the Bangweulu Game Management Area. Signatories included Senior Chief Kopa, Chief Nsamba, Chief Kabinga, Chief Bwalyamponda, Chief Chitambo, and a representative of Chief Chiundaponde.

==== Luwingu Game Management Area ====
An area of 1090 km^{2} of mainly miombo woodland northeast of the wetlands in Luwingu and Kasama Districts of Northern Province. It has wetlands along river courses and adjoins Isangano National Park.

==== Chambeshi Game Management Area ====
An area of 620 km^{2} of permanent swamp and grassy floodplains between the Bangweulu GMA and Isangano National Park, with the Chambeshi River in its southeast. It is in Chilubi District of Northern Province.

==== Kafinda Game Management Area ====
An area of 3860 km^{2} of mainly miombo woodland south of the wetlands, but with a small area of permanent swamp in the north of the GMA, and wetlands extending along river courses that arise within it. Kasanka National Park is a separate enclave in its centre and southeast. It is in Chitambo and Serenje Districts of Central Province, and DRC Congo adjoins its western boundary.

==== Kalasa Mukoso Game Management Area ====
An area of 675 km^{2} of swamps, dambos, floodplains and miombo woodland in Samfya District of Luapula Province southwest of the wetlands, with the Luapula River forming its southern boundary and border with DRC Congo.

=== National Parks in the Bangweulu wetlands ===
==== Isangano National Park ====
A remote and relatively inaccessible area of 820 km^{2} of miombo woodland interspered with dambos, extending onto floodplain in the southwest, and with the Lubansenshi River and its permanent swamps and floodplain running through its centre. Its lack of management and visitor facilities has resulted in more than twenty years of encroachment by settlements and farming, the most serious in any national park in the country, calling into question its status. This has resulted in a scarcity of game animals but it is still rich in birdlife. It is in Chilubi and Kasama Districts of Northern Province.

==== Kasanka National Park ====
An area of 390 km^{2} within Kafinda GMA of mainly miombo woodland, with roughly 110 km^{2} being small lakes and wetlands. Kasanka was the first of Zambia’s national parks to be managed by a private-public partnership, Kasanka Trust Ltd and the Department of National Parks and Wildlife (DNPW). This partnership has been successful in wildlife conservation and running a small tourist trade with good visitor facilities. Many Kasanka visitors also go to the Bangweulu GMA. The Park is part of the greater Bangweulu ecosystem especially for mammals and birds, but as its only drainage is the Luwombwa River westwards to the Luapula below the latter's exit from the Bangweulu Swamps, it does not have a direct connection to the Bangweulu wetlands. It is in Chitambo and Serenje Districts of Central Province.

== Flora and fauna ==
The populations of crocodiles, fish, and water birds. Mammals include buffalo, Burchell's zebra, bushbuck, common tsessebe, elephants, hippopotamus, hyenas, jackals, oribi, reedbuck, roan and sable antelope, and sitatunga. Bangweulu has the only remaining significant population of the black lechwe; There were an estimated 36,600 reported in 2020. Millions of straw-coloured fruit bats migrate to Bangweulu's Mushitu swamp forest in Kasanka National Park. In 2016, African Parks partnered with Fondation Segré to relocate 600 animals, including hartebeest, impala, and puku, into the wetlands. Cheetahs were reintroduced to the reserve in 2020, almost a century after their absence.

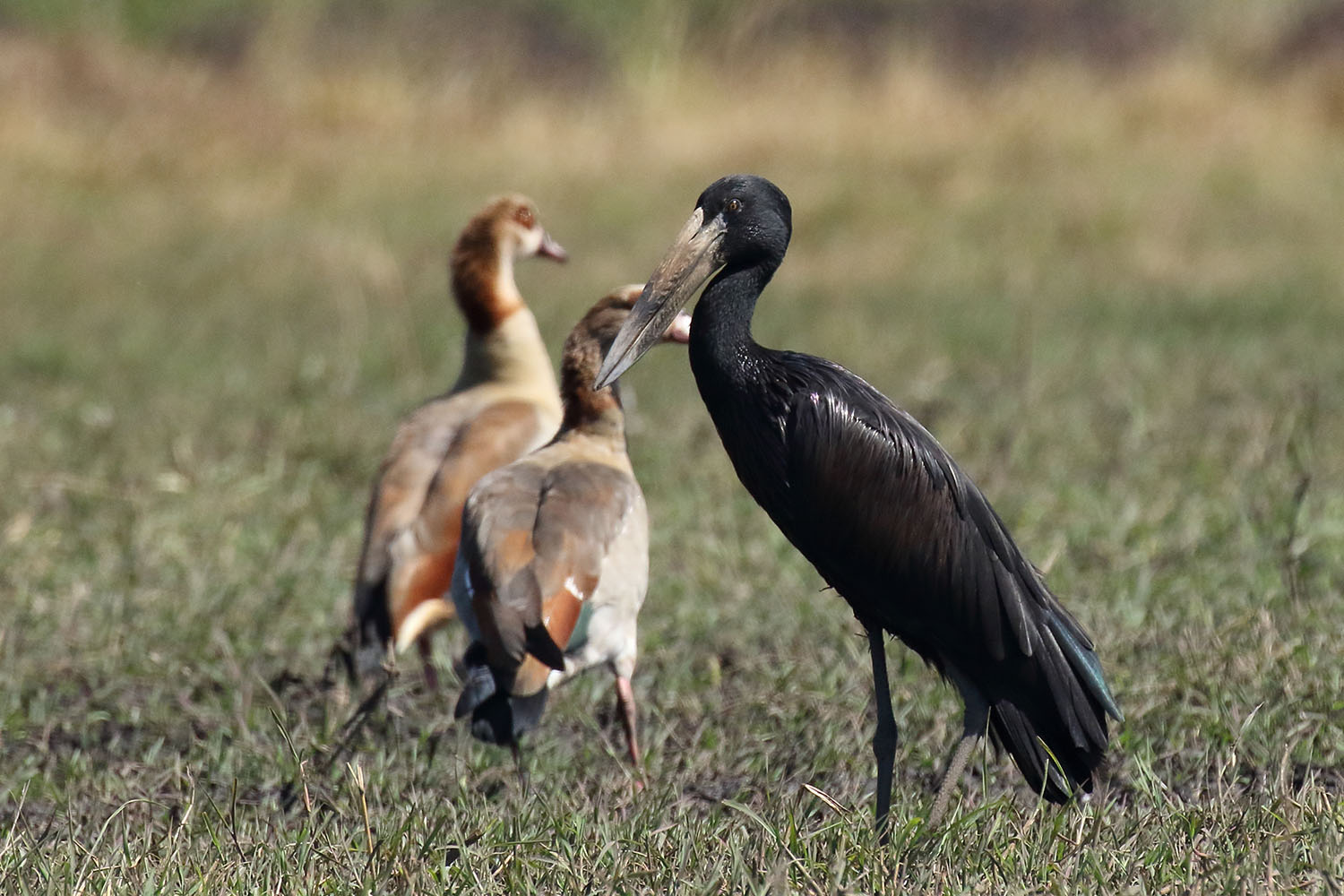
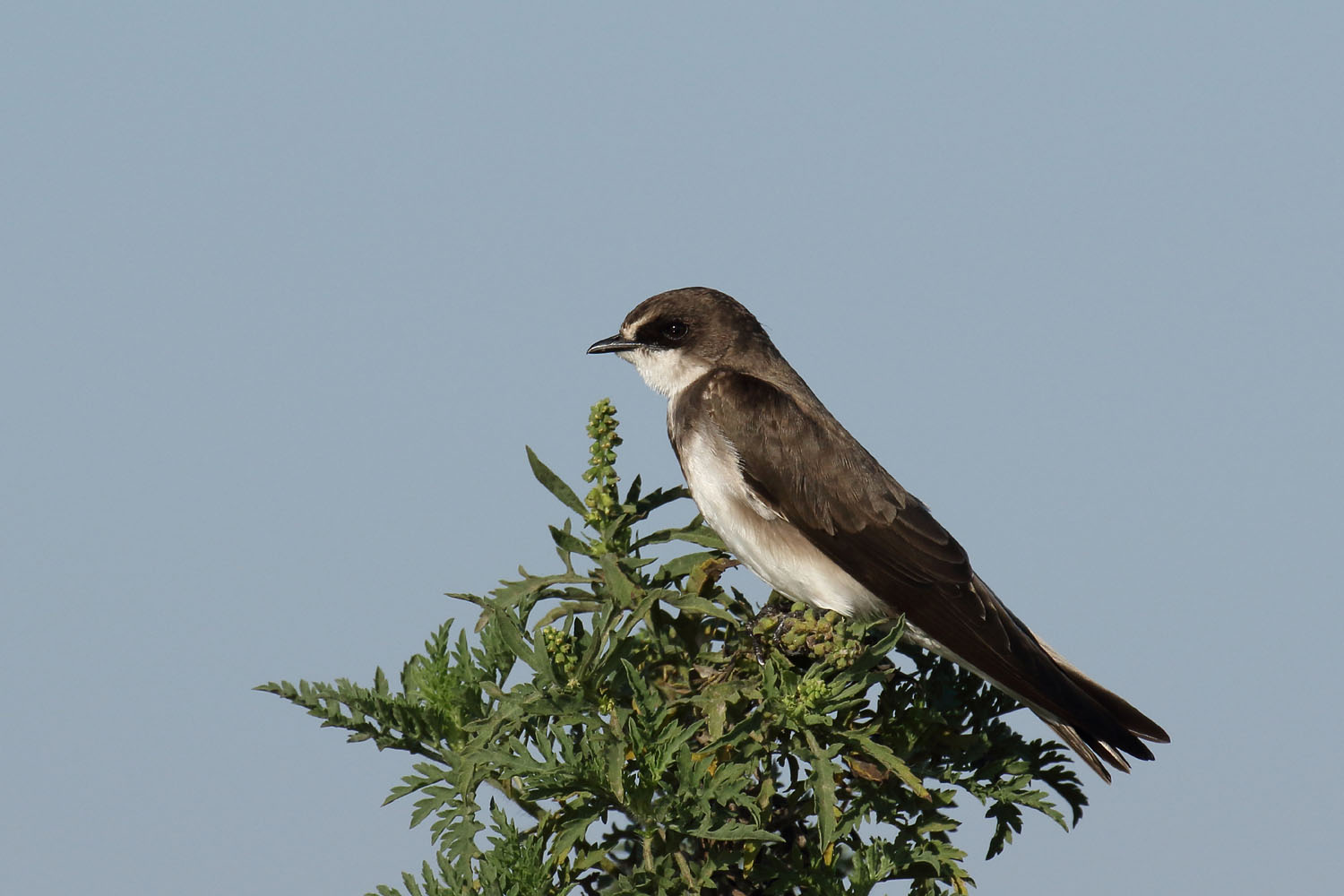
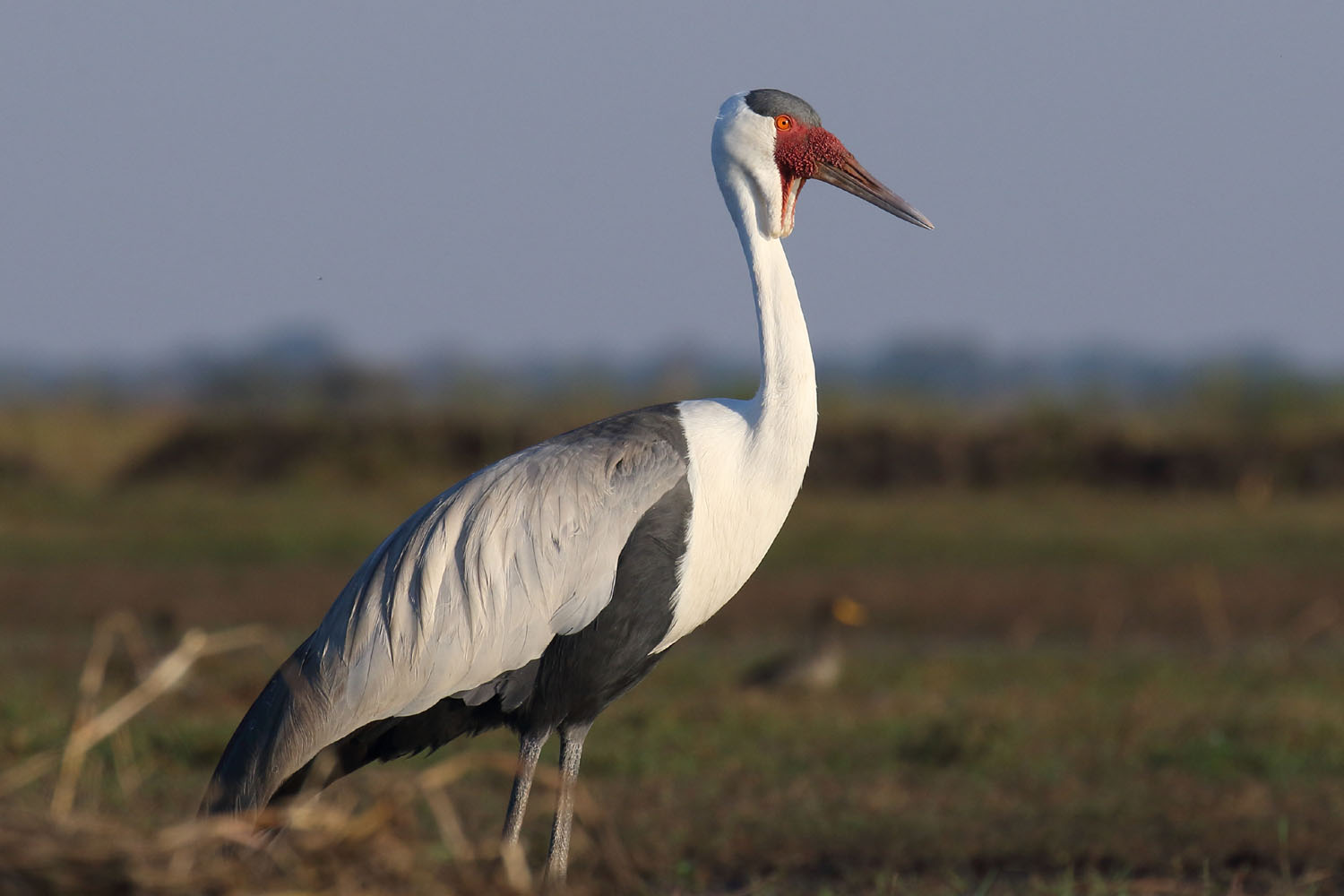
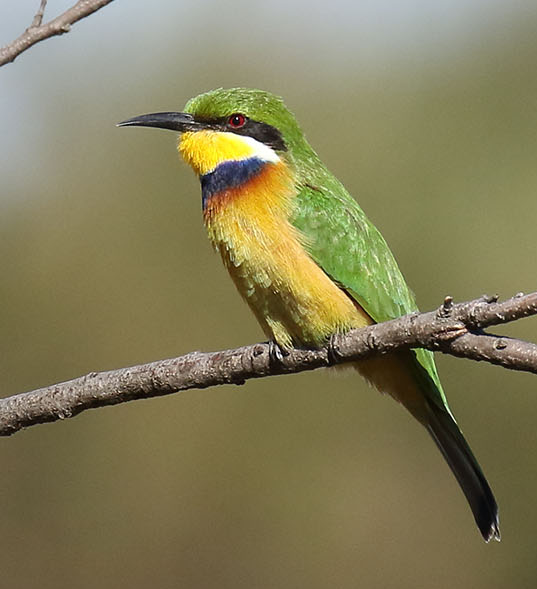
A variety of bird species live in Bangweulu, including the African openbill, banded martin, blue-breasted bee-eater, and wattled crane (displayed clockwise from top left), photographed in the wetlands in 2016

Bangweulu has been designated as an "Important Bird Area" by BirdLife International. The wetlands are home to more than 400 bird species, including cormorants, ducks, egrets, geese, herons, ibises, pygmy goose, and waders. Most notable is the shoebill, a vulnerable species threatened by habitat burning for farming, competition with fisheries, wildlife trade, and other disturbances. In 2022 a Shoebill rearing and rehabilitation facility was established. The facility cares for chicks then release them back to the region. Other species recorded in Bangweulu include the great white pelican, saddle-billed stork, African spoonbill, and wattled crane.

=== Human–wildlife conflict ===
Bangweulu encompasses several villages, and an estimated 50,000–90,000 people depend on the wetlands, resulting in human–wildlife conflict. The ecosystem is threatened by habitat burning for farming, overfishing, and poaching. The increased use of mosquito nets for fishing has decreased fish populations in Bangweulu and throughout Zambia. To combat these problems, African Parks developed several community programs and enterprise projects, including bee-keeping, sustainable fisheries management, and reproductive health education. As a result, poaching and other illegal activities have been largely contained, and fish stocks have managed to recover.

== See also ==
- Wildlife of Zambia
