= Bangweulu (constituency) =

Constituency of the National Assembly of Zambia

Bangweulu is a constituency of the National Assembly of Zambia. It covers an area to the south of Lake Bangweulu in Samfya District, including the town of Samfya, in Luapula Province.

== List of MPs ==
Election year	MP	Party
1962	Kenneth Kaunda	United National Independence Party
1964	Hankey Kalanga	United National Independence Party
Seat abolished
1983	Joseph Kasongo	United National Independence Party
1988	Joseph Kasongo	United National Independence Party
1991	Joseph Kasongo	United National Independence Party
1996	Daniel Pule	Movement for Multi-Party Democracy
2001	Joseph Kasongo	Independent
2006	Joseph Kasongo	Patriotic Front
2011	Chifita Matafwali	Patriotic Front
2015 (by-election)	Anthony Kasandwe	Patriotic Front
2016	Anthony Kasandwe	Patriotic Front
2021	Anthony Kasandwe	Patriotic Front
2026	Happy Mampa	United Party for National Development
