= Chilubi (constituency) =

Constituency of the National Assembly of Zambia

Chilubi is a constituency of the National Assembly of Zambia. It covers a rural area (Chilubi) on the eastern shore of Lake Bangweulu in Chilubi District of Northern Province.

In November 2019, MP Rosaria Fundaga died, and Mulenga Fube was elected in a by-election on February 15, 2020.

== List of MPs ==
Election year	MP	Party
1973	Remi Chisupa	United National Independence Party
1978	Remi Chisupa	United National Independence Party
1983	Rabbison Chongo	United National Independence Party
1988	Rabbison Chongo	United National Independence Party
1991	Edward Chitungulu	Movement for Multi-Party Democracy
1994 (by-election)	Shisala Mponda	Movement for Multi-Party Democracy
1996	Shisala Mponda	Movement for Multi-Party Democracy
2001	Chola Chisupa	Movement for Multi-Party Democracy
2006	Obius Chisala	Patriotic Front
2011	Obius Chisala	Patriotic Front
2016	Rosaria Fundanga	Patriotic Front
2020 (by-election)	Mulenga Francis Fube	Patriotic Front
2021	Mulenga Francis Fube	Patriotic Front
2026	Mathias Chitembo	United Party for National Development
