= Isangano National Park =

National Park in Zambia

- Location within Zambia
- Location: Northern Province of Zambia
- Nearest city: Kasama
- Coordinates: 11°10′S 30°40′E
- Area: 840 km^{2} (320 sq mi)
- Max. elevation: 1220 m
- Min. elevation: 1180 m
- Established: 1972
- Governing body: Department of National Parks and Wildlife of Zambia
- Website: https://www.zambiatourism.com/destinations/national-parks/isangano-national-park/

Isangano National Park is a national park of 840 square kilometres in the Northern Province of Zambia, on the northern margin of the Bangweulu Wetlands, comprising a mixture of wetlands and miombo dryland. A small proportion is permanent swamp, adjacent to three main rivers. It was created as a game reserve in Luwingu District in 1957 and declared a national park in 1972. It went into decline due to squatting (illegal human settlement), deforestation and poaching, and a lack of funds to manage conservation. This has resulted in a scarcity of game animals but it is still rich in birdlife. There are no visitor facilities in the Park and its remote location makes access and management difficult.

The illegal settlement in the Park has been a public issue since at least 2007, despite court orders, government policies, and discussions in the National Assembly of Zambia (the Parliament) on a number of occasions. The extent of these problems have led to questions being asked as to whether the Park should be degazetted (abolished). Isangano NP has become a case of conflicting interests of wildlife and rural communities in the country.

== Geography ==
=== Physical geography and ecological zones ===
The average elevation is about 1200 m with a range of less than 40 m. Average annual rainfall is about 1300 mm with most falling in the rainy season of October/November to April/May. Maximum inundation of the floodplains occurs in April and the maximum extent of dry land occurs in November–December. The seasonal difference in water levels is only 1–2 m, the same as for the Bangweulu Wetlands as a whole, but the flatness of the terrain means the edge of the flood advances and recedes by many kilometres.

Three rivers flow northeast to southwest at the boundaries of the Park or through it:

- the Lukutu River, or rather the centre line of its dambo (width 1–5 km) since it lacks clearly-defined channels, forms the main western boundary;
- the Lubansenshi River flows through the park, just southeast of its centre, in a 5-km wide floodplain of swamps and dambos; in the far south of the Park, the river forms its western boundary;
- the Chambeshi River forms the southeast boundary, in swamp and dambo floodplain that (in the Park vicinity) is narrower than that of the Lubansenshi, but widens in the direction of flow.

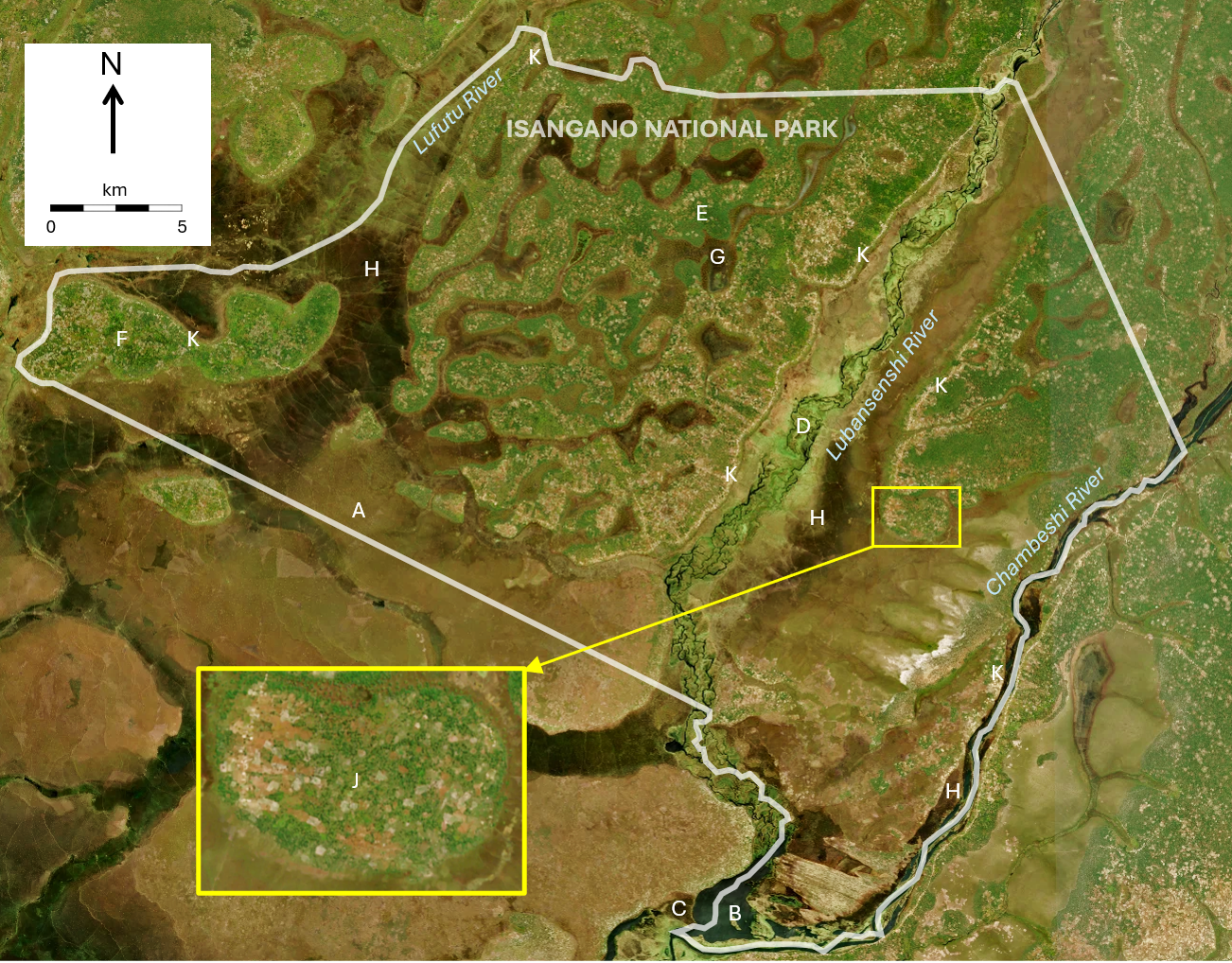
Annotated satellite image of Isangano National Park — labels A–K are explained in the text. The inset zooms into an area of miombo to show signs of settlement and cultivation in more detail.

These rivers are labelled in the annotated satellite image-based map. The letters A to K on the map refer to locations of features explained below.

The main southwestern boundary of the park (A) lies in a dambo floodplain that is the northern margin of the main Bangweulu Wetlands floodplain.

A lagoon and permanent swamp system with a total open water area of about 10 km^{2} is located (B) just before the Lubansenshi-Chambeshi confluence (C) in the southernmost extremity of the park. A larger swamp system averaging about 1 km across, but with a length in the Park of about 40 km, is formed by the Lubansenshi with multiple river channels, many meanders, and lagoons (D).

The Park is in the transition zone between the southern wetland and slightly higher northern dryland. The latter comprises nearly half the Park area and is covered in miombo woodland (E) which does not usually flood. It occurs mainly in the north and centre of the Park, and between the Lubansenshi and Chambeshi Rivers, and in the extreme west of the Park on Minswa Island (F). Except on the island, the miombo is interspersed with headwater dambos in shallow depressions (G), forming alternating patches loosely connected, rather than the dendritic drainage pattern of dambos usually seen on the northern plateau. The other dambos in the Park are in the seasonally-inundated floodplains of the rivers, especially the Lukutu (H), and in the general floodplain of the Bangweulu wetlands extending to the southwest (A). These are prime wildlife areas of the Park especially in the flood season.

=== Human-modified habitats: illegal settlements and farming ===
Satellite imagery is used to show land use in Zambia, and in the context of conservation management is effective in showing where settlement and farming in miombo woodland encroaches on wildlife habitats. Untouched areas of miombo are a fairly uniform green colour, as shown, for example, in the satellite image-based map in the Lusenga Plain National Park article. The same kind of image for Isangano, above, shows patches of light green or grey, light brown and yellow-brown in the green miombo areas, some roughly circular while others have straight sides or are rectangular. These patches are slash-and-burn chitemene gardens or small cultivated subsistence fields. All areas of the miombo in the park have such patches. The inset (J) on the satellite map is a zoomed-in sample to show them in more detail.

Another sign of human settlement in the Park are the strings of yellow-brown colour (K) seen along the edges of the miombo on both sides of the floodplain of the Lubansenshi. A few are also seen on the northwest bank of the Chambeshi, in the northeast of the Park near the dambo of the Lufutu, and on Minswa Island. Zooming in on these strings in high-resolution satellite images shows that they are villages strung out along bush paths.

== Wildlife ==
Over 300 species of birds can be seen in the Park, some being seasonal visitors because they are migratory or they are water birds dependent on flooding. Game animals that can still be seen in the Park are the black lechwe, reedbuck, oribi, sitatunga, tsessebe, reedbuck, elephant, buffalo, crocodile and hippo, zebra, hartebeest, roan antelope, eland, bushbuck and warthog; but they are not common, for the reasons already given.

=== Wildlife conservation management at Isangano ===
The Department of Wildlife and National Parks (DNPW) in the Ministry of Tourism administers national parks. Government environmental policies have changed in recent decades to advocating community consultation and support, and benefit going to the community in the form of employment and economic opportunities. Public-Private Partnerships (PPP) are the preferred option but reliable partners can be hard to find. Public education and sensitisation programmes are preferred methods of seeking compliance rather than use of force, as part of a larger Community-Based Wildlife Management framework. Debate in the National Assembly advocated that traditional rulers, who in rural communities customarily allocate land to villagers, should be involved. Consideration of human–wildlife conflict and its reduction is another essential aspect.

The DNPW does not have the ability to evict and resettle illegal squatters (illegal settlers) on the scale that has happened at Isangano. District and provincial government has to be involved as well as some other national agencies such as the Department of Resettlement in the office of the Vice-President.

==== The Park's district and constituency location ====
Issues that have been raised concerning Isangano include a lack of clarity about Park boundaries and in which Northern Province districts and constituencies it is located. According to their websites, the councils of bothLuwingu and Chilubi Districts of the Northern Province lay claim to Isangano:

- "Chilubi district is endowed with rich natural resources . . . and the Isangano national park."
- "Luwingu District also hosts Isangano Game Reserve, located in Isangano Ward, which adds to its tourism potential."

According to Google Earth and Google Maps:

- about 60% of the Park — the area between the Lukutu and Lubansenshi Rivers — is located in Chilubi District
- the rest, about 40%, between Lubansenshi and Chambeshi Rivers, is in Kasama District
- Luwingu District, of which Chilubi was a part prior to its creation in 1979, lies on the Park's northern border
- Across the Chambeshi River in the southwest of the Park is Kanchibiya District in Muchinga Province.

Illegal settlers in the Park could come from or be resettled in any of the four different districts listed above, so these are all potential stakeholders in any eviction action and resettlement programme, as well as in community education and sensitisation initiatives.

A further complication for the Park is that the constituencies (electoral districts determining who represents any area in the National Assembly) differ from the administrative districts (determining who delivers government services). The area of the Park between the Lukutu and Lubansenshi Rivers falls within the Isangano Ward of Lubansenshi Constituency in Luwingu District, while the area between the Lubansenshi and Chambeshi Rivers is in the Musowa Ward of Lukaysha constituency.

At various different times discussion in the National Assembly has referred to the Park being in Luwingu and Chilubi Districts, Luwingu District alone, Luwingu and Kasama Districts, and Chilubi and Lubansenshi Districts.

==== Protection of Isangano ====
Isangano National Park became a protected reserve in 1957 so settlement, farming and hunting within the Park has been illegal since at least that time. But wildlife populations decreased due to poaching and bushmeat harvesting — a lack of employment opportunities meant subsistence farming and hunting was often the only option for surrounding rural communities, and this was exacerbated by a lack of funds, infrastructure, support and management during Zambia's economic downturn in the 1980s and 90s.

By the early 2000s illegal settlement had become common in the park. A news article in 2007 reported that court cases had confirmed the legal right of provincial and district authorities to evict squatters, and the Provincial Development Coordinating Committee passed a resolution to do so, but this required demarcation of the district boundaries and identification and resettlement of illegal settlers. The Member of Parliament for Chilubi said the major obstacle to resolving the matter was a Park boundary dispute and the people of Chilubi would have no problem to resettle the squatters if they are told that Isangano National Game Park was in their district. It was also reported that the squatters needed to be moved before the Park could be restocked with wildlife and improved.

==== Summary of issues concerning Isangano NP discussed in the National Assembly of Zambia ====
The National Assembly has been informed of or has discussed the following issues in relation to Isangano:

- 24th January, 2008: A local chief who had led people to settle in the Park had been ordered to leave and the people had been given until February 2008 to leave.
- 23rd October, 2009: An MP representing the area claimed that the settlers he knew of were not actually in the Park and had been there for 20 years. The MP claimed the Wildlife Authority had not marked the boundaries clearly and asked for the issue to be investigated.
- 24th September, 2013: A government Minister said that encroachments on the Park were 'surrounded by politics'.
- 18th February, 2016: Eviction of squatters was planned for December 2015 but was postponed to June 2016. But land for resettlement had not been identified. There were forty-three settlements and 10,158 people.
- 22nd March, 2017: Efforts to evict the squatters stalled due to disagreements on use of force and whether some level of coexistence was possible. The DNPW intended to sensitise the communities on the regulations governing encroachments in a protected area to trigger voluntary resettlement from the national park. Once funds were made available to the department, a plan would be drawn up in collaboration with other Government departments such as the Disaster Management and Mitigation Unit (DMMU) to relocate the illegal settlers from the national park. Meanwhile some stakeholders should be advised against putting up infrastructure in protected areas. Only after the squatters have been evicted from the national park will the plans of restocking it be drawn up and implemented. Politicians should support the Government when it asks people to vacate protected areas. To some extent, they are to blame for the illegal settlements through encouraging squatters to stay on.
- 24 Nov 2021: The government was asked if it intended to degazette some of the national parks that "have been taken over by human settlement" and where schools and clinics had been established. The reply was that no national parks would be degazetted, and the citizens living in those places are there illegally.
- 30 Nov 2021: The budget for resettlement of Isangano's illegal squatters by the Office of the Vice-President would have to be expanded greatly due to the large numbers involved.
- 19th June 2024: The National Assembly was told that as people were already living in the Park, government has constructed schools and health clinics there. The squatters in Isangano National Park had a leadership system, with village headmen who would show letters of consent on how they settled in the area.
- 19th June 2024: Resettlement of squatters will be determined by the Department of Resettlement once all logistical arrangements have been put in place.

== Visitor facilities ==
There is no visitor accommodation in the Park and no entry gates, Park offices, game scout posts, staff housing or other facilities.

=== Transport ===
The Park's only road access, as shown on Google Maps, is from Luwingu District, turning off south from the Kasama–Luwingu main sealed highway at Mumana Lupando, 15 km west of Munkonge Mini Hospital. This dirt road goes to Shimumbi, where the route turns east then south, following the left bank of he Lukutu River. It enters the Park at 11.0139°S 30.5630°E, about 125 km from the main road turnoff. It is likely to be impassable in the rainy season due to the numerous dambo crossings and probably requires a 4WD vehicle even in the dry season. Google Earth in 2026 shows that a number of dambo bridges just north of the Park have gaps and need reconstruction.

If Isangano National Park is indeed in Chilubi District, it is the eastern extremity of it, with no direct road access to it, because the 2 km wide Lukutu floodplain cuts it off. The nearest town to the Park is Mofu, across the floodplain from the Park's western extremity on Minswa Island. The district headquarters are on Chilubi Island in Lake Bangweulu and can only be reached by boat.

There may be other rough bush tracks, requiring 4WD vehicles, entering from Luwingu or Kasama Districts in the northeast .

Boat access is possible from the Chambeshi River where its west bank is in the Park, or via its confluence with the Lubansenshi River. It is possible to go up the latter river but that requires navigating its many meanders. The Chambeshi River can be reached via a dirt track to the village of Mbati, 48 km from the Kasama–Mpika sealed highway, and boats can be launched from near the Mbati Health Centre.

There are no airfields in the Park, there is a small airfield in Mofu with no facilities. The nearest airport with scheduled flights is Kasama Airport, 150 km northeast.

=== Wildlife tours ===
Private tourism companies based outside Isangano offer guided walking, driving and boat safaris in the Park at times of the year when the water levels and road conditions allow it.

== History ==
The first written account of the Bangweulu wetlands was made by Scottish missionary explorer David Livingstone, who crossed the southern part of what is now the Park in April 1873, at the height of the flood season, trying to locate rivers flowing out of the Bangweulu system. This was to support his belief that rivers in the Mweru-Bangweulu area might be the ultimate source of the Nile rather than rivers flowing into Lake Victoria. His small party struggled through the floodwaters and papyrus swamps with only a couple of dugout canoes which they used to relay themselves and their loads across deeper water. Livingstone noted the presence in the area that became the Park of herds of elephants, buffalo, hartebeest, and black lechwe, as well as solitary sitatunga, and at night they heard the roaring of lions. On 26th March 1873 they crossed the Lubansenshi and Chambeshi Rivers just upstream of their confluence in the south of the Park. Livingstone died five weeks later at Chief Chitambo's village in the southeastern margin of the Bangweulu Wetlands.
