= Chozi =

Chozi may refer to:

- Chozi, Zambia, a small town in northeastern Zambia
- Chozi River, a river of northeastern Zambia
