= Enteromius owenae =

Conservation status
- Data Deficient (IUCN 3.1)

Scientific classification
- Domain: Eukaryota
- Kingdom: Animalia
- Phylum: Chordata
- Class: Actinopterygii
- Order: Cypriniformes
- Family: Cyprinidae
- Subfamily: Smiliogastrinae
- Genus: Enteromius
- Species: E. owenae

Binomial name
- Enteromius owenae Ricardo-Bertram, 1943

Synonyms
- Barbus owenae

Species of fish

Enteromius owenae is a species of cyprinid fish in the genus Enteromius which occurs in Lake Bangweulu and the Chambezi River in Zambia.

== Footnotes ==
- Froese, Rainer; Pauly, Daniel (eds.). "Enteromius owenae". FishBase.
