= Sunday Chanda =

Zambian politician (born 1976)

Honorable Sunday Chanda

Elected member of the National Assembly
- Incumbent
- Assumed office 2021
- Constituency: Kanchibiya

Personal details
- Born: Sunday Chilufya Chanda; 12 September 1976 (age 49) Ndola, Zambia
- Party: Patriotic Front

Sunday Chilufya Chanda (born 12 September 1976) is a Zambian politician who serves as Member of Parliament for Kanchibiya Constituency in Northern Zambia. He was elected to the position in August 2021.

== Early life ==
Chanda was born in Ndola at Masala Police Camp on 12 September 1976 to a father who was a policeman and a mother who was a housewife. His father resigned from the Zambia Police to join Ndola City Council as Bar Manager in Kabushi township in Ndola in the 80s. After working for the council, his father pushed himself until he joined Bank of Zambia through night school. In 2023, Chanda stated that “my late father’s unrelenting fighting spirit lives in me and I draw inspiration from it”. Chanda attended primary education in Ndola.

== Politics and education ==
Chanda began active involvement in Zambian politics as a card carrying member of the Zambia Democratic Congress (ZADECO) under the late Dean Namulya Mung’omba in 1996. He later became director of the Open Society Foundation where he challenged several government decisions that he believed were not in the interests of ordinary Zambians. He then went on to join the then ruling Patriotic Front and was appointed as the party's media director. In 2021, he sought the Party's adoption to contest the Kanchibiya Parliamentary seat which he won with a majority on 12 August. He has a law degree from the University of Lusaka.

== Parliamentary work ==
Chanda has been one of the MPs advocating for the effective use of the Constituency Development Fund - CDF by using the fund to support the agricultural sector and its value chain in his constituency, constructing roads, bridges, first ever mortuary and first ever radio station, schools and health centres in Kanchibiya District. He serves in two Parliamentary Committees namely: Parliamentary Committee on National Security and Foreign Affairs and the Parliamentary Committee on Transport, Works and Supply.

In 2025, Chanda expressed support for Hakainde Hichilema, becoming the first member of the opposition to endorse President Hichilema.

== Climate change advocacy ==
Chanda has used his space in Zambian politics to advocate for Climate Change particularly on issues of local forests management, carbon trading, land conservation, climate smart agriculture, land maintenance and restoration.

== Personal life ==
Chanda is also author of his first Pan African Book entitled “In Defence of my Heritage” - which focuses on the Black race. He is married and has children.
