= Lunga District =

Coordinates: 10°25′S 29°00′E

- District
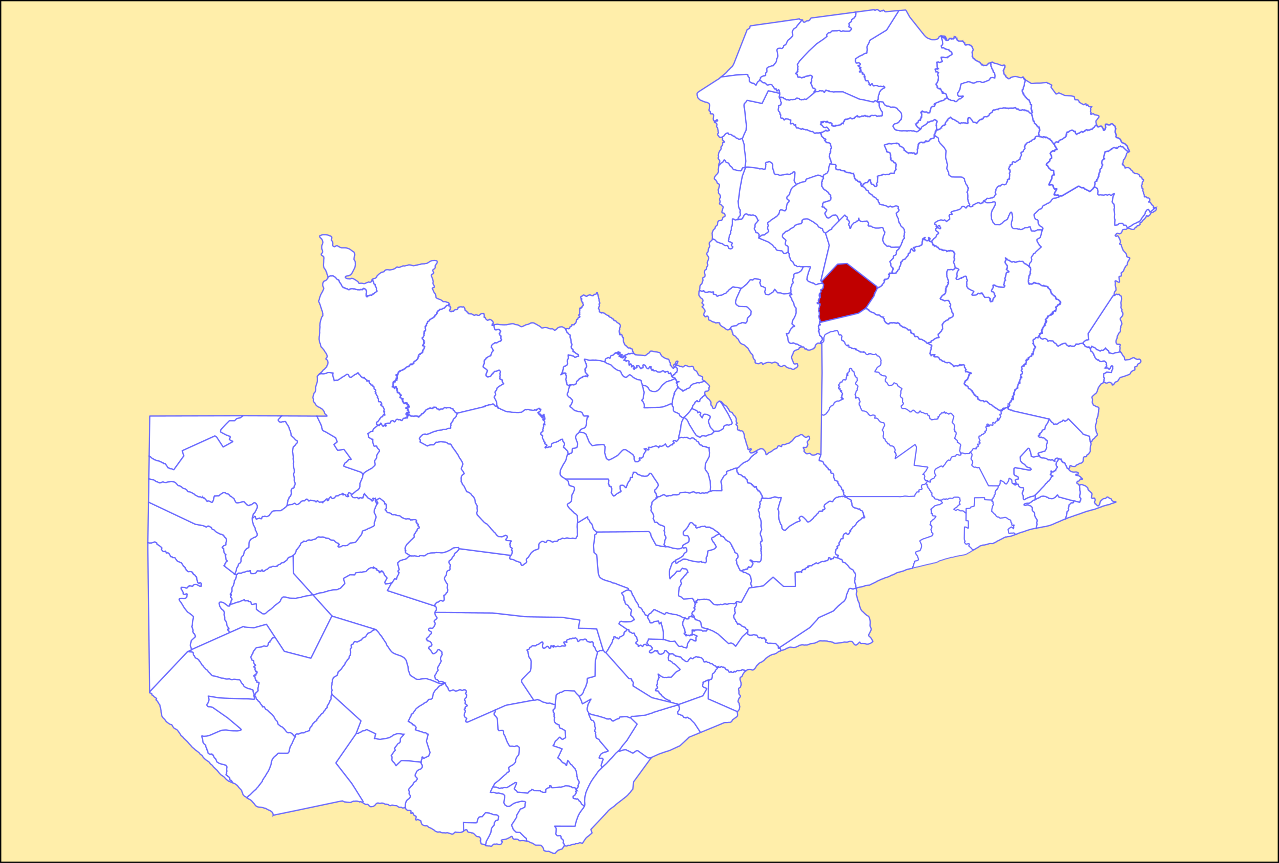
- District location in Zambia
- Country: Zambia
- Province: Luapula Province

Area
  - Total: 3,839.5 km^{2} (1,482.4 sq mi)

Population (2022)
  - Total: 39,383
  - Density: 10.257/km^{2} (26.566/sq mi)
- Time zone: UTC+2 (CAT)

Lunga District is a district in the Luapula Province of Zambia. It was declared a district in 2012 by Michael Sata (by splitting Samfya District). The district comprises archipelago of islands in the Bangweulu Wetlands in the south-east of Lake Bangweulu. As of the 2022 Zambian Census, the district had a population of 39,383 people.
