= Kanchibiya =

Constituency of the National Assembly of Zambia

Kanchibiya is a constituency of the National Assembly of Zambia. It covers the towns of Chalabesa, Chikuni, Kasongo, Katumba, Mpepo, Mulongwa and Ngungwa of Kanchibiya District in Muchinga Province.

== List of MPs ==
Election year	MP	Party
1991	Newton Ng'uni	Movement for Multi-Party Democracy
1996	Newton Ng'uni	Movement for Multi-Party Democracy
2001	Judith Kangoma	Movement for Multi-Party Democracy
2006	Albert Kanyanyamina	Patriotic Front
2011	Davies Mwango	Patriotic Front
2016	Martin Malama	Patriotic Front
2021	Sunday Chanda	Patriotic Front
2026	Sampa Muswema	National Reconciliation Party for Unity and Prosperity
