= Chifita Matafwali =

Zambian politician

Member of the National Assembly
- In office 2011 – 20 May 2015
- Succeeded by: Anthony Kasandwe
- Constituency: Bangweulu

Personal details
- Born: 28 November 1959; Samfya, Zambia
- Died: 20 May 2015 (aged 55); Pune, India
- Political party: Patriotic Front

Chifita Matafwali (28 November 1959 – 20 May 2015) was a Zambian politician. He was a member of the National Assembly for the Bangweulu constituency for the Patriotic Front since the 2011 elections.

Matafwali died at age 55 while undergoing, or shortly after, a kidney transplant in the Jehangir Hospital in Pune, India on 20 May 2015. Anthony Kasandwe of the Patriotic Front was elected as Matafwali's successor in June 2015.

== Personal life ==
Matafwali was born on 28 November 1959 in Samfya. His father, Scott Matafwali, served as a member of the National Assembly for Bangweulu between 1970 and 1978. Matafwali followed his primary and secondary education in Samfya. He later studied economics at the University of Zambia. After his period at university Matafwali worked for PricewaterhouseCoopers and Chibote Investments until 2001 and subsequently as a consultant.

In 2001 elections Matafwali unsuccessfully ran as a candidate of the Zambia Republican Party for the Bangweulu constituency.

Matafwali was married and had four children.
