= Rosaria C. Fundanga =

Zambian politician

Rosaria C. Fundanga (died 20 November 2019) was a Zambian politician.

Fundanga was a member of the National Assembly of Zambia for Chilubi. She was a member of the Patriotic Front.

Following her death in November 2019, Mulenga Fube from the same party was elected for Chilubi in a by-election held on February 15, 2020.
