= Chilubi District =

Coordinates: 11.0217°S 30.2314°E

- District
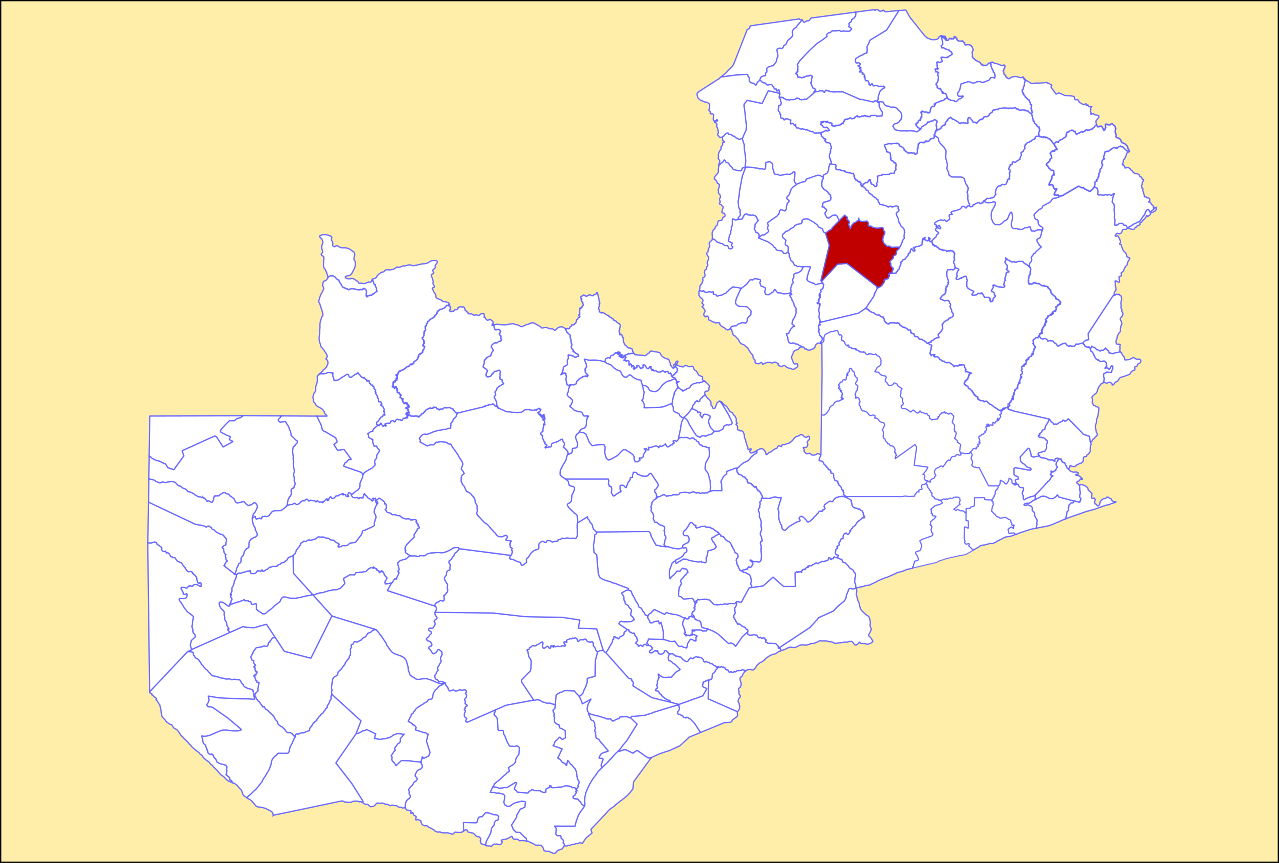
- District location in Zambia
- Country: Zambia
- Province: Northern Province
- Capital: Chilubi

Area
  - Total: 5,169.6 km^{2} (1,996.0 sq mi)

Population (2022)
  - Total: 114,011
  - Density: 22.054/km^{2} (57.120/sq mi)
- Time zone: UTC+2 (CAT)

Chilubi District with headquarters at Chilubi is located in Northern Province, Zambia. It covers the north-east Lake Bangweulu and Bangweulu Wetlands containing several islands including Chilubi Island, and some of the mainland northeast of the lake. As of the 2022 Zambian Census, the district had a population of 114,011 people.

Other islands in Chilubi District include Chichile, Kasansa, Panyo Island and Luangwa, all at the edges of the swamps where they dry out sufficiently in the dry season to form a connection to the mainland.

Isangano National Park lies in the east of the district but it has no management and most of the wildlife has been poached out.
