= Chozi River =

River in Zambia

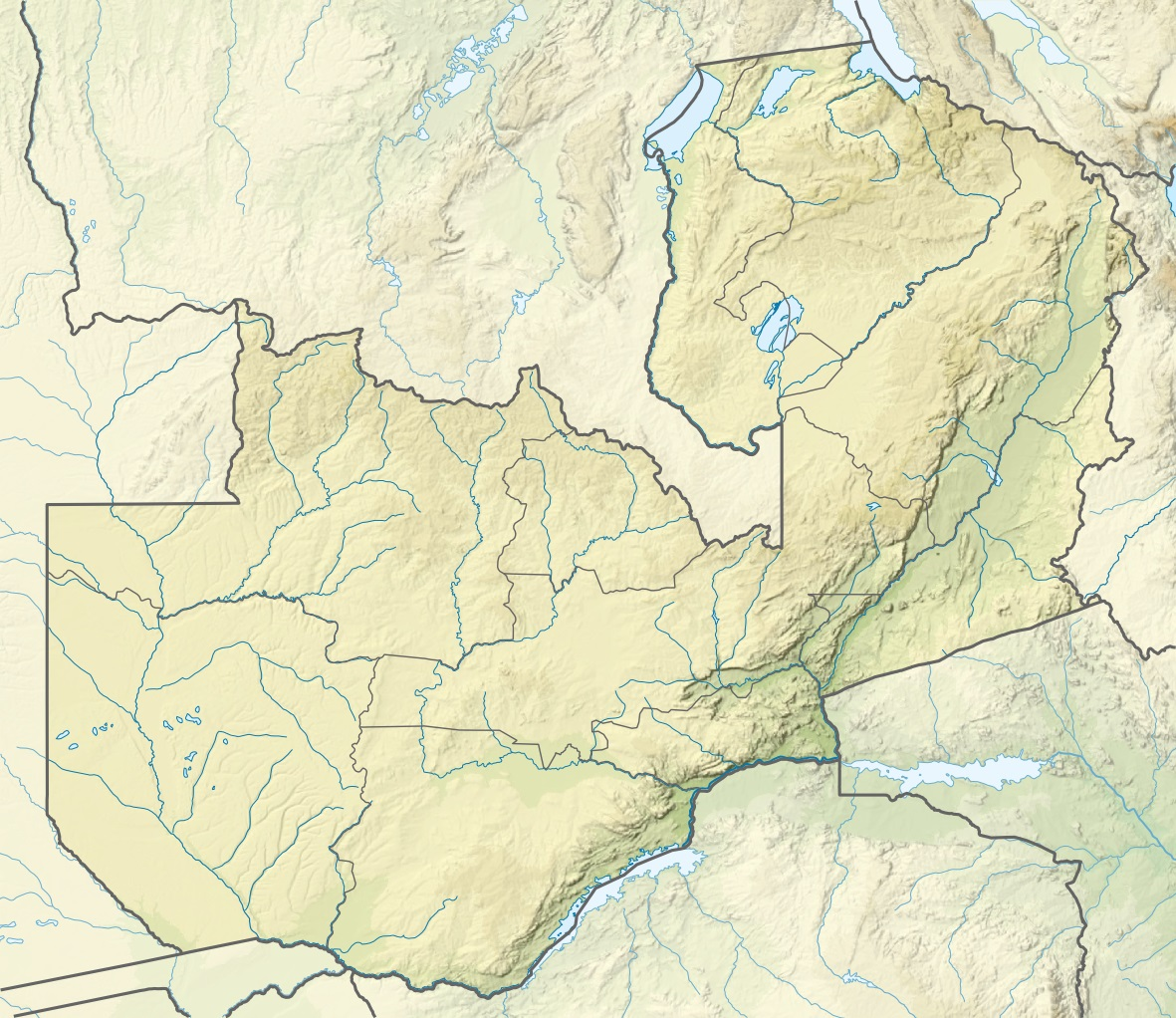

Physical characteristics
- Mouth
  - coordinates: 9°51′19″S 32°10′31″E

The Chozi is a river located in the Muchinga Province in northeastern Zambia, and is a tributary of the upper Chambeshi River. One of the tributaries of the Chozi is the Nbumba Stream. The village of Chozi is in the vicinity. The watershed between the Chozi and the Saisi River contains Nausu Hill.

The Cleopatra smithi species of freshwater snails are found in the river.
