= Anthony Kasandwe =

Zambian politician (born 1969)

Anthony Kasandwe MP

Member of the National Assembly of Zambia
- Incumbent
- Assumed office 6 August 2015
- Preceded by: Chifita Matafwali
- Constituency: Bangweulu

Personal details
- Born: Anthony Kasandwe; 2 September 1969 (age 56)
- Party: Patriotic Front
- Occupation: Member of Parliament
- Profession: Politician

Anthony Kasandwe (born 2 September 1969) is a Zambian politician. Kasandwe is a member of the Patriotic Front. He has been serving as a Member of the National Assembly of Zambia for Bangweulu since 2015, when he won a by-election.

== Biography ==
Kasandwe was born on 2 September 1969. He holds an advanced diploma in business administration, a bachelor of arts in developmental studies and a diploma in philosophy and religious studies.

Kasandwe is a member of the Patriotic Front. In 2015, President Edgar Lungu announced Kasandwe as the PF's by-election candidate for Bangweulu. The by-election was called after incumbent MP Chifita Matafwali died. Kasandwe won the seat on 6 August 2015 after receiving 9,516 votes versus 1,862 votes for his closest competitor. He won a full term in the 2016 general election.

Kasandwe is married.
