= Chilubi =

Settlement in the Northern Province of Zambia

Coordinates: 11°09′S 29°55′E

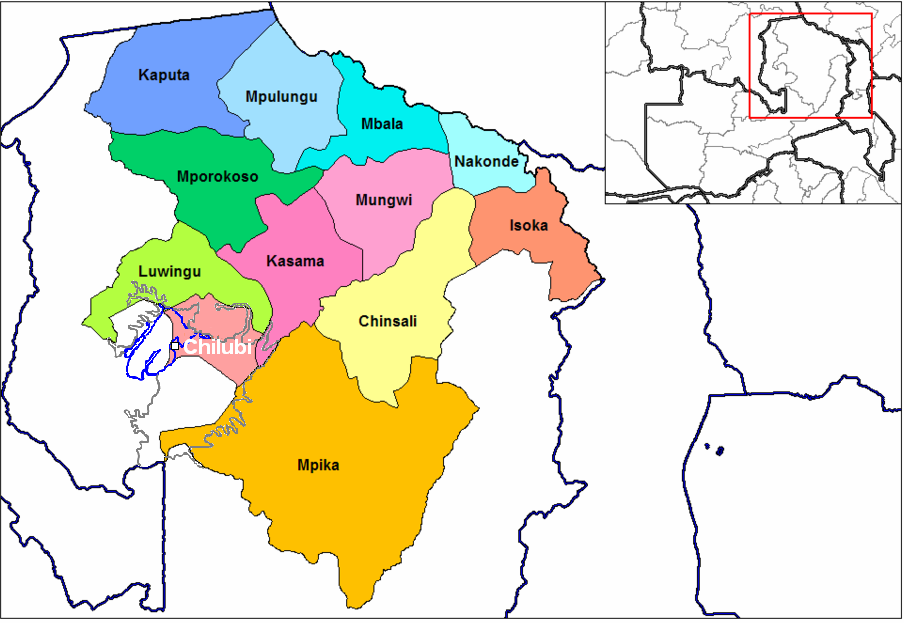
Location of Chilubi town and district in Northern Province, Zambia, showing extent of Lake Bangweulu (blue line) and swamps (grey line)

Chilubi is a settlement on an island in Lake Bangweulu and its swamps, and is headquarters of Chilubi District in the Northern Province of Zambia.

== Chilubi Island ==
Chilubi Island lies just north of the centre of the eastern side of the lake. It has an unusual zig-zag shape of about five segments, each about 12 km long and 1.5 to 3 km wide. It resembles a Chinese dragon with its head (at the north-west end) just in the open lake and its body and tail (south-east end) in the swamps. The shortest distance on land from nose to tail is 25 km, and it has about 100 km of shoreline. The smaller Nsumbu Island lies 1 km south-east of Chilubi Island. Satellite image:

The shores of Chilubi Island are lined with villages while the interior consists of patches of wooded grassland. The soil is largely sandy and not so fertile, and the only food that grows well in it is cassava, which is the staple of the people on the island. The main settlements on Chilubi Island are Muchinshi, Bukotelo (headquarters of Chief Chiwanangala), Yombwe, Kashitu, Kapampa, Muule, and Santa Maria, a Catholic mission.

The island is served by passenger ferries from Samfya and Nsombo in Luwingu District and Chaba at the north end of the lake, and there is an airstrip at the mission, which in the past has mostly served the flying doctors' service.

The main occupation of the island is fishing and subsistence farming, with some employment provided by schools, a health centre, the District Council and the mission.

== Chilubi town ==
The town or large village is situated at the most north-westerly tip of the island. Chilubi is 45 km across the lake from Samfya, 28 km from Chaba and 38 km from Nsombo. Chilubi is unique in Zambia, being the only one of the 116 district headquarters or bomas on an island, with no road connections.

== History ==
During the colonial era, the island was visited regularly but infrequently by the local Government representative, who would hold discussions with the local chiefs and sub-chiefs, to learn of their problems and to explain government policies, as well as to take a census, and collect taxes. Their reports were similar in style and content to those in the Domesday Book.

A boma was first established at the southern tip of the island, but it was burned down in March 1959 during "The Chilubi Incident".

== See also ==
- Northern Province
- Lake Bangweulu
- Samfya
