= Chozi, Zambia =

Settlement in Zambia

Chozi
- Town
- Location in Zambia
- Coordinates: 09°19′33″S 32°40′53″E
- Country: Zambia
- Province: Muchinga Province
- District: Nakonde District

Area
  - Total: 98 sq mi (254 km^{2})
- Elevation: 4,124 ft (1,257 m)

Population (2010 Census)
  - Total: 7,131
- Time zone: UTC+2 (CAT)

Chozi is a town in the Nakonde District of Muchinga Province in Zambia.

== Geography ==
=== Location ===
Chozi is situated around 10 kilometers (6.2 miles) to the west of Nakonde, which is the district headquarters located near the border with Tanzania. The town is located about 177 kilometers (110 miles) northeast of Chinsali, the provincial capital.

Lusaka, the largest city and capital of Zambia lies approximately 1,302 kilometers (809 miles) southwest of Chozi by road. Chozi sits at an average altitude of 1,257 metres (4,124 ft) above mean sea level. The geographical coordinates of Chozi, Zambia are 9°19'33.0"S, 32°40'53.0"E (Latitude:-9.325833; Longitude:32.681389).

== Overview ==
Chozi is part of the Nakonde constituency, which is a significant political region in the area. Additionally, the town is home to the Mwenzo Mission, which is a notable establishment in the community. The Chozi River flows through the area, and nearby is the Chozi Floodplain where local farmers grow crops, adding to the town's economic importance.

== Economy ==
Chozi's economy is significantly boosted by its connection to the Chozi railway station, through which various minerals are transported. Copper, lead, and zinc are some of the significant minerals transported through the station, and in 1978, approximately 4,907 tonnes of copper and 548 tonnes of lead and zinc were left at Chozi for a month during transportation. The mineral transportation industry is a vital source of economic activity in Chozi, providing employment opportunities and supporting local businesses.

== Transport ==
Chozi is located at the north-eastern end of the Nseluka–Kayambi–Chozi Road, which connects Mungwi District to the southwest and Nakonde District to the northeast. The road spans a distance of 172 kilometers (107 miles) and was initially a gravel surface. However, in the late 2010s, the road was upgraded to a class II bitumen surface and now includes culverts and drainage channels. This upgrade has improved transportation and connectivity in the region, making it easier for locals to access essential services and boosting economic activity in the area.

== Population ==
According to the 2010 national population census Chozi had 7,131 people, with 3,503 males (49.1 percent) and 3,628 females (50.9 percent).

== Health ==
Chozi is served by Chozi Rural Health Centre, a health facility under the administration of the Zambian Ministry of Health.
