= Lake Bangweulu =

Lake in Zambia

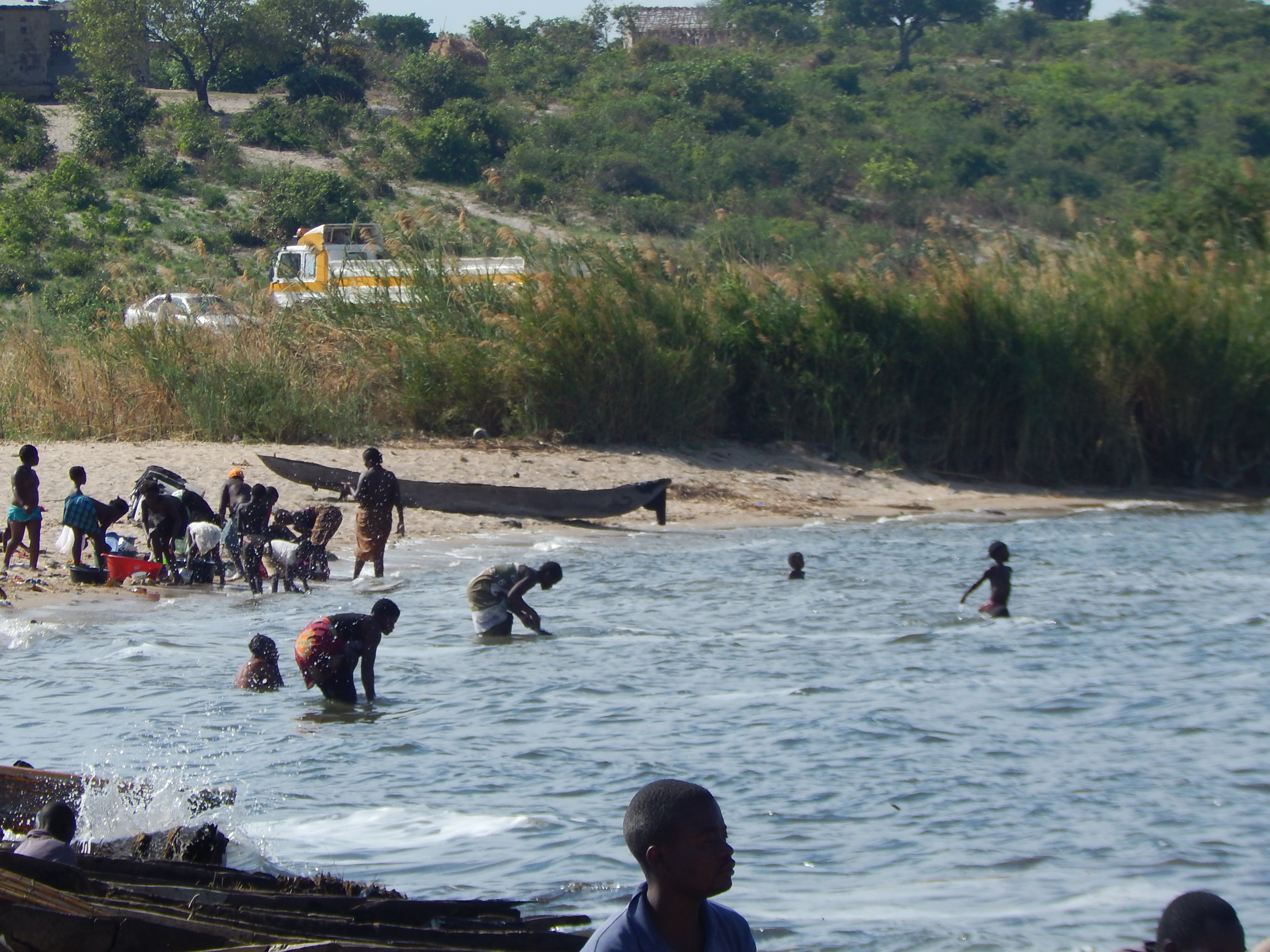
- Locals on the shore of Lake Bangweulu

- Location within Zambia Location within Africa
- Location: Luapula Province and Northern Province
- Coordinates: 11°05′S 29°45′E
- Primary inflows: Chambeshi
- Primary outflows: Luapula River
- Basin countries: Zambia
- Surface area: 15,100 km^{2} (5,800 sq mi)
- Water volume: 5,000 million cubic metres (4,100,000 acre⋅ft)
- Surface elevation: 1,140 m (3,740 ft)

Ramsar Wetland
- Official name: Bangweulu Swamps
- Designated: 28 August 1991
- Reference no.: 531

Lake Bangweulu ('where the water meets the sky') is a freshwater lake in northern Zambia. The lake comprises a number of embayments (sections) and it is surrounded on nearly all sides, except the southwest, by the Bangweulu Wetlands, one of the world's great wetland systems, comprising permanent swamps with smaller lakes, lagoons and myriad channels (sometimes together referred to as the Bangweulu Swamps); seasonally-inundated grassy floodplains (also called the Bangweulu Flats); and dambos along the margins of dry land, the latter being covered mainly in miombo woodland. All may be considered as one ecosystem, or as a mosaic of interrelated ecosystems.

Situated in the upper Congo River basin on the flat Zambian plateau, the Bangweulu lake and wetland system covers an area of about 15,000 km^{2}, of which the open water surface of the lake is about 3,000 km^{2}. The wetlands minus the lake cover about 12,000 km^{2} and their boundary is highly variable, both within and between years. The seasonal difference between high and low water is of the order of 1–2 m but the extreme flatness of the topography means that the edge of the flood advances and retreats by up to 45 km over the floodplains, and the floodwater does not appreciably erode the terrain, nor deposit debris or a great deal of silt. The surface is at an elevation of 1,140 m and the dry land does not rise to more than a few tens of metres on the shores or the islands. The lake has an average depth of only 4 m, and a maximum depth of 10 m. The system is fed by about seventeen rivers of which the Chambeshi (the source of the Congo River) is the largest, and is drained by the Luapula River.

The climate of northern Zambia has a wet season from October/November to April/May, with a dry season in the remainder of the year. Maximum flood levels are usually reached in May and minimum in December. Annual rainfall averages 1200 mm over the lake and wetlands.

The system is crucial to the economy and biodiversity of northern Zambia, and to the birdlife of a much larger region, and faces environmental stress and conservation issues. Most of the wetlands are protected to some degree, as featured in the article Bangweulu wetlands conservation.

== History ==
=== European exploration ===
The lake was known to Europeans from reports by chiefs such as Kazembe and from Swahili traders, and it was sometimes referred to as 'Lake Bemba' from the name of the dominant tribe. In 1868 explorer and missionary David Livingstone was the first European to see the lake at the north end of the Lake Chifunabuli section. He was taken by canoe as far as Mbabala Island. His last expedition a few years later foundered in the swamps and their maze of shifting channels as he struggled to discover the rivers draining in and out of the lake. He died in 1873 in Chief Chitambo's village on the edge of the southern flood plain, about 100 km from the lake itself. The spot is marked by the Livingstone Memorial (see map). The lake was partially surveyed in 1883 by the French traveller, Victor Giraud, and first circumnavigated by Poulett Weatherley in 1896.

Lake Bangweulu (red) and the Congo River system

It was a desire for the riches of Bangweulu's fisheries and game-rich floodplain which motivated King Leopold II of Belgium to insist, in border negotiations between his Congo Free State and the British in Northern Rhodesia, on a land corridor reaching Bangweulu from Katanga. This resulted in the shape of the Congo Pedicle (34) which, as it turned out, does not penetrate the area enough to be of the desired value.

The first Christian missions in Bangweulu were founded in the early 1900s under the authority of Bishop Joseph Dupont of the Catholic White Fathers who was based north of Kasama.

== Human settlement ==
The area of the lake is inhabited by the Bisa in Chilubi and Mpika, the Bemba in Luwingu, the Unga in Lunga, the Kabende in Samfya, the Ngumbo in Lubwe, the BenaMukulu in Chungu and affiliated tribes who all speak Chibemba. The Bemba heartland of Paramount Chief Chitimukulu lies to the north-east, around Kasama.

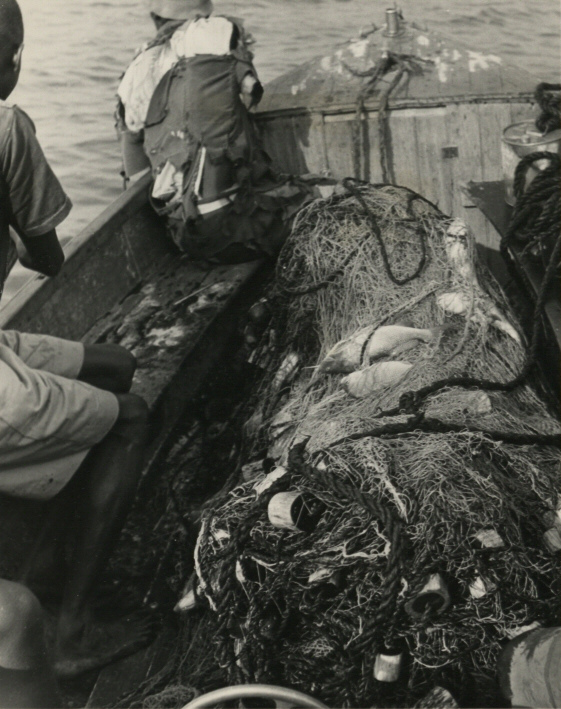
Catfish and bream hauled in from Bangweulu (from Africa Through a Lens)

=== Fishery ===
The lake supports a seasonal fishing industry and the population may increase markedly during the season. In 1989 the average annual catch was estimated at 11,900 tonnes, caught by 10,300 people using 5305 dugout canoes, 114 plank and fibreglass boats, and only 54 outboard motors. In 2000 the catch was 13,500 t.

=== Natural gas pipeline ===
In early 2004 a private European natural gas company finished preliminary plans to lay a pipeline which would cut directly through the Southeast portion of the lake. Part of this plan was a proposed dam to allow for partial drainage of the required part of the lake. This plan was met with harsh opposition from the local people as well as environmental activists. After much court-wrangling and lengthy hearings on the project, the plan was disposed of by the European company as they built a detour for their pipeline in the surrounding province.

=== Towns and districts ===
The largest town, Samfya lies on the south-western shore and is the principal base for road and boat transport and tourism, as well as being the administrative centre for Samfya District covering about three-quarters of the lake and swamps. Chilubi District covers most of the rest, its boma is on Chilubi Island (6), which is bordered by the swamps to the east. Luwingu District just touches the lake at Nsombo, which is the principal town at the northern end of the lake. Mpika and Kasama districts just touch the eastern and southern margins of the floodplain, and Serenje District and the Congo Pedicle just reach the southern margin of the floodplain.

== Sections of Lake Bangweulu ==
Numbers in round brackets like so — (12) — refer to locations on the satellite image.

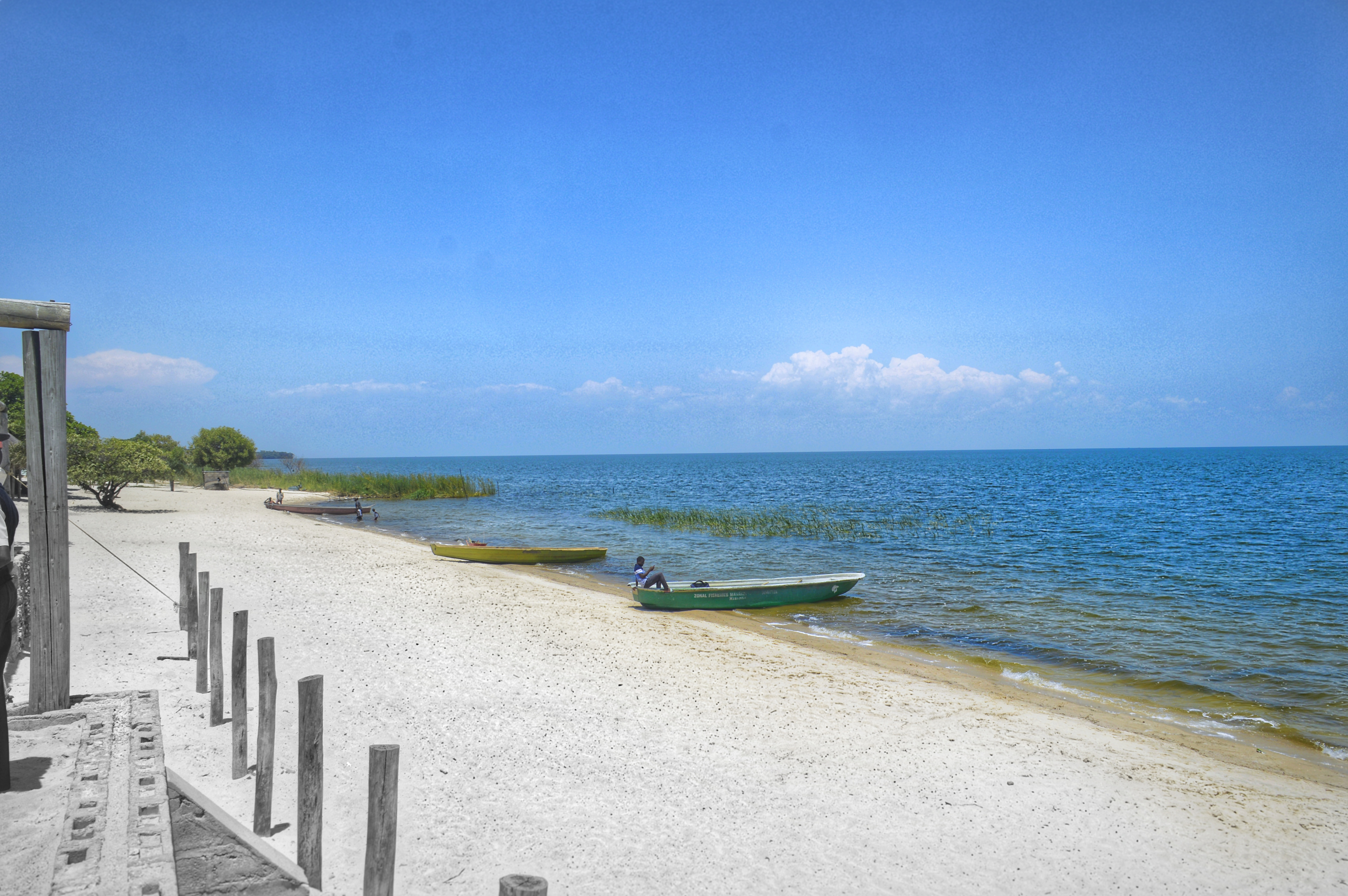
Samfya beach.

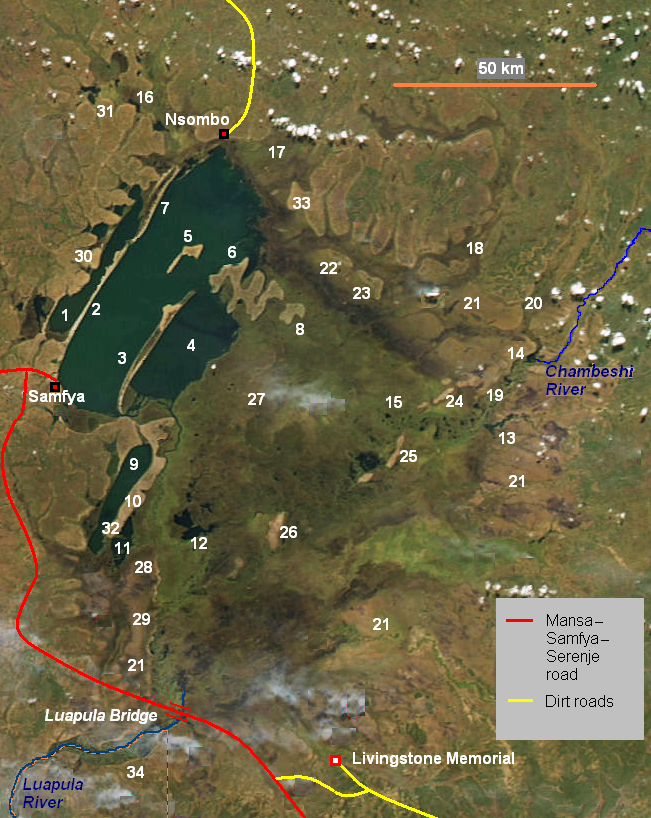
Satellite photograph of Lake Bangweulu (upper left) and the Bangweulu Swamps (centre). Water shows as dark green. Key: 1 Lake Chifunabuli, 2 Ifunge Peninsula, 3 Mbabala Island, 4 Lake Walilupe, 5 Chishi Island, 6 Chilubi Island, 7 Ifunge Mwenzi Island, 8 Nsumbu Island, 9 Lake Kampolombo, 10 Kapata Peninsula, 11 Lake Kangwena, 12 Lake Chali, 13 Lake Chaya, 14 Lake Wumba, 15 Pook Lagoon, 16 Lupososhi Estuary, 17 Luena Estuary, 18 Lukuto Estuary, 19 Chambeshi Estuary, 20 Luansenshi River, 21 Grassy floodplains, 22 Chichile Island, 23 Kasansa Island, 24 Panyo Island, 25 Nsalushi Island, 26 Ncheta Island, 27 Lunga Bank, 28 Kasenga, 29 Kataba, 30 Lubwe, 31 Kasaba, 32 Twingi, 33 Chaba, 34 Congo Pedicle.

A notable feature of the Bangweulu system is a series of parallel sandy ridges running south-west to north-east. These are particularly striking in satellite photographs and are easily seen along the north-western shore, the Lifunge Peninsula (2), Mbalala Island (3), Chilubi Island (6), and the Kapata Peninsula (10). They divide the lake into three sections parallel to its main axis. One divides off a section called Lake Chifunabuli (1), 50 km long but only 5 km wide. Its entrance through a gap in the sand spits (at the end of Lifunge Peninsula) is only 250 m wide. Another sandy ridge, Mbabala Island, divides off a section called Lake Walilupe (4), 30 km long by 13 km wide. The main, middle section of the lake between Ifunge and Mbabala is known only as Bangweulu.

There are numerous bays, inlets, smaller lakes and lagoons around Lake Bangweulu, connected by open water, narrow channels or swamps. The largest is Lake Kampolombo (9), 30 km by 5 km, south of Lake Walilupe and connected to it by a 7 km channel. The 32 km long Kapata Peninsula lies between Lake Kampolombo and the swamps; at its tip on the eastern side is the 15 km long Lake Kangwena (11).

Only the western side of the lake and some of the islands have a well defined shore, with sandy beaches in places especially around Samfya, though even there, some of the bays and inlets are swampy.

It was found that infection with Schistosoma haematobium on the western shores of Lake Bangweulu, Zambia, is higher than previously reported.

== The Bangweulu Swamps ==
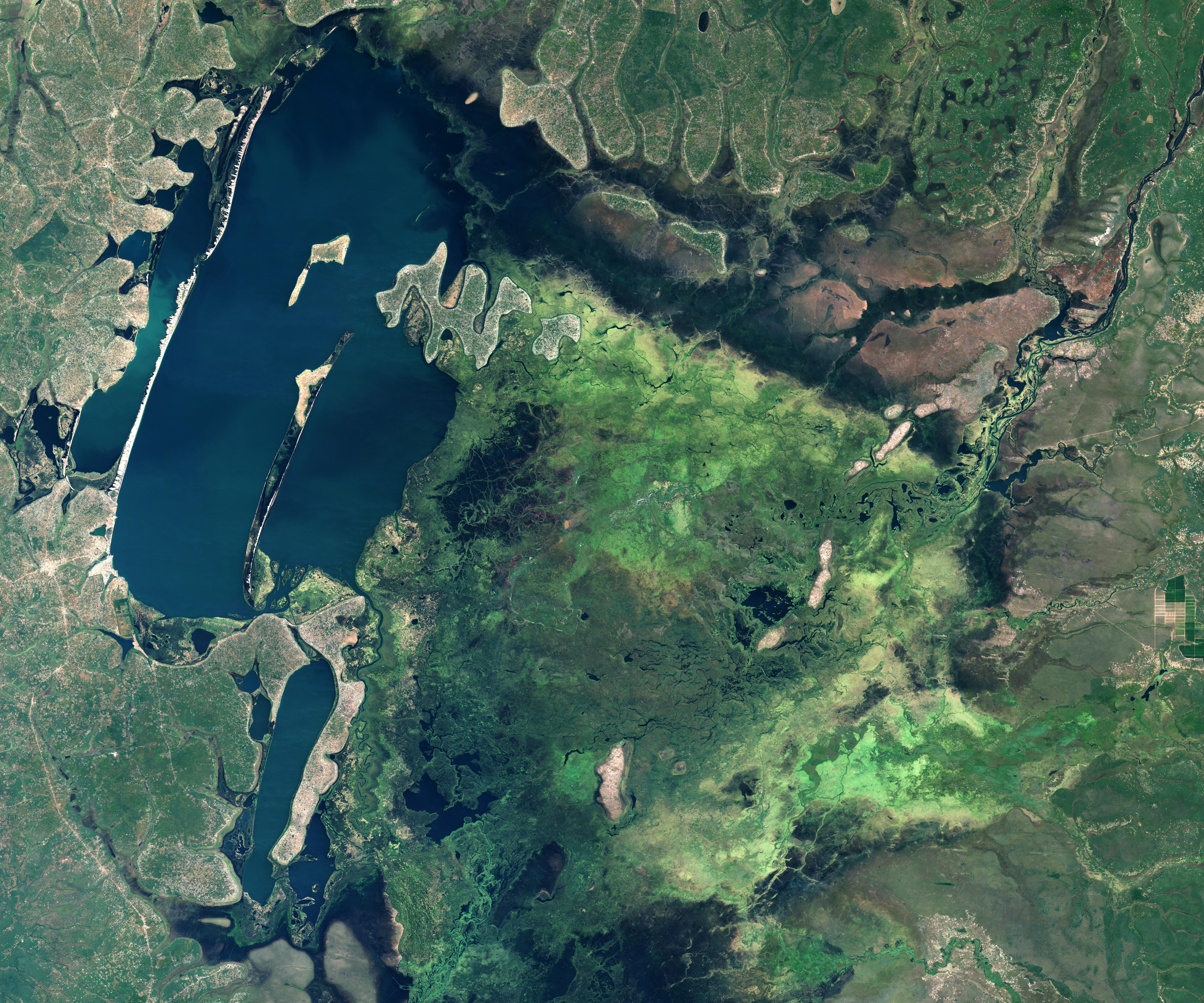
Satellite view of the lake and the swamps, May 2020

The Bangweulu Swamps, larger than the lake, extend from the north-west clockwise around to the south. The main part covers an area of roughly 120 km by 75 km and they are normally not less than 9,000 km^{2}.

The swamps act as a check on annual flooding downstream in the Luapula by releasing water slowly through many lagoons and channels. They help prevent the Luapula valley being flooded excessively in the rainy season.

=== Rivers and channels through the swamps ===
The Bangweulu swamps are fed mainly from the north-east by the Chambeshi River, and drain to the south into the Luapula River. The lake is connected to these rivers, and they to each other, by a complex mass of channels through the swamps that may become choked by vegetation and change their course; there is no easy navigation between them. Floating beds of papyrus may close up the channels to a width allowing only dugout canoes to pass. Motorised vessels are hampered by their width as well as by vegetation clogging propellers. Since colonial times attempts have been made to improve navigation and alter drainage patterns by cutting channels through the swamp. In 1942, attempts were made, with limited success, to cut an outlet from Lake Walilupe to the Luapula's exit from the swamps, to allow motor boats to transport cassava and other produce from the northern area of the lake to Kapalala Ferry on the Luapula and from there to the Copperbelt.

=== Lagoons ===
There are numerous lagoons in the swamps, the more prominent ones are: Lake Chali (12) in the south-west, Lake Chaya (13) in the east at the mouth of the Lulingilla River in the east, Lake Wumba (14) in the north-east at the confluence of the Chambeshi and Luansenshi (20) Rivers, and the Pook Lagoon (15) in the East near Nsalushi Island (25).

=== Other features of the swamps ===
On the northern side there are several wide swampy estuaries where rivers enter the lake or swamps, going from north-west to north-east they are: Lupososhi Estuary (16), Luena Estuary (17), Lukuto Estuary (18), Chambeshi Estuary (19) (and Luansenshi Estuary which feeds into it).

On the eastern and south-eastern sides the swamps are fed by the Munikashi, Luitikila, Lumbatwa, Lukulu and Lulimala rivers. The estuaries of the last three are the main dry season grazing grounds of the Black Lechwe.

In the main part of the swamps, just south of Chilubi Island, is a large area which is very shallow in the flood season and may become fairly dry at the end of the dry season, called the Lunga Bank (27).

=== Floodplains ===
An area of about 3,000 km^{2} of large grassy floodplains lies mainly south of the swamps, but also in the north-north-east, acting as an extension of the region in the wet season. The southern floodplains are famous for large herds of the near-endemic black lechwe. Further information on wildlife of the wetlands is found on the Bangweulu Wetlands page.

=== Water parameters ===
Water temperatures at the surface of the Bangweulu system ranged from 25.8 to 28.3 °C in November 1993 and from 23.7 to 27.1 °C in February 1994. The conductivity of the Bangweulu system is unusually low and varies between 20 and 40 μS/cm. Transparency of the water ranges from 0.35 to 0.60 m in most water bodies of the system, but in the Tuchingo lagoon the transparency is much larger (>1.70 m) allowing the bottom to be seen.

== Islands ==
There are numerous inhabited islands in the Bangweulu system.

On the lake they are:

- Chilubi Island (6), the largest, partly in the lake and mainly in the swamps
- Mbabala Island (3), a sand spit dividing off the Lake Walilupe section
- Chishi Island (5), in the middle of the northern part of the lake
- Lifunge Mwenzi Island (7), dividing off the northern part of Lake Chifunabuli
- Small Islands: Chindo and Ibula Islands near the north-west shore, and Chibwe Ngombe Island, a tiny sliver north-west of Chilubi Island, Minswa Island and Ngwishi Island

In the swamps:

- Nsumbu Island (8) east of Chilubi Island
- In the eastern swamps: Chisale Island, Panyo Island (24), Nsalushi Island (25), Nsumpa Island, Matongo Island and Kabulu Island
- Near the Chambeshi River where it enters the eastern swamps: Mutwamina Island and Munyanga Island
- In the southern swamps: Ncheta Island (26) (with the village of Bwalya Mponda), and Mbo, east of the Luapula's exit from the swamps
- Kasoma village [the seat of the new Lunga District] on the south-east edge of the Lunga Bank
- Kalimakonde village on the banks of the Churchill Channel

Flood season islands: on the edge of the swamps, connected to the mainland in the dry season:

- In the north-east: Kasansa Island (23), Chichile Island (22), Luangwa Island, Mbishi Island, and Munkanta at the edge of Lake Chaya, where the Lulingila River enters the eastern swamps.
- In the south: Kasenga (28), close to the outlet of Lake Kangwena, Kataba (29), and Yongolo, and Itulo at the edge of south-east swamps.

=== Other settlements ===
- Lubwe (30) on Lake Chifunabuli has a Catholic mission and hospital
- Kasaba (31), a Catholic mission in the north-west
- Santa Maria, a mission on Chilubi Island
- Mpanta, east of Samfya on the channel draining out of Lake Walilupe
- Twingi (32), with a mission, at the south end of the Kapata Peninsula
- Chaba (33), in the north-east
- Mofu, in the north-east.

== See also ==
- Water transport in Zambia
- Mokele-mbembe
