= Samfya =

Human settlement in Zambia

Coordinates: 11°21′S 29°33′E

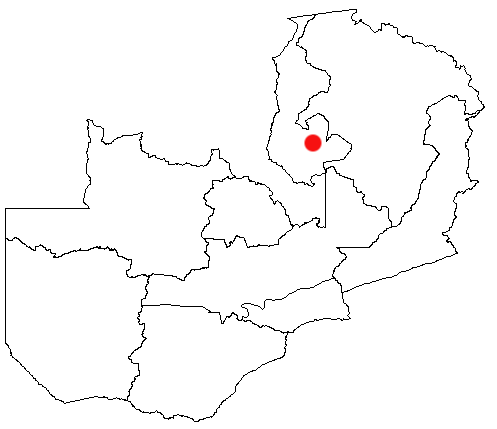
Location of Samfya in Zambia

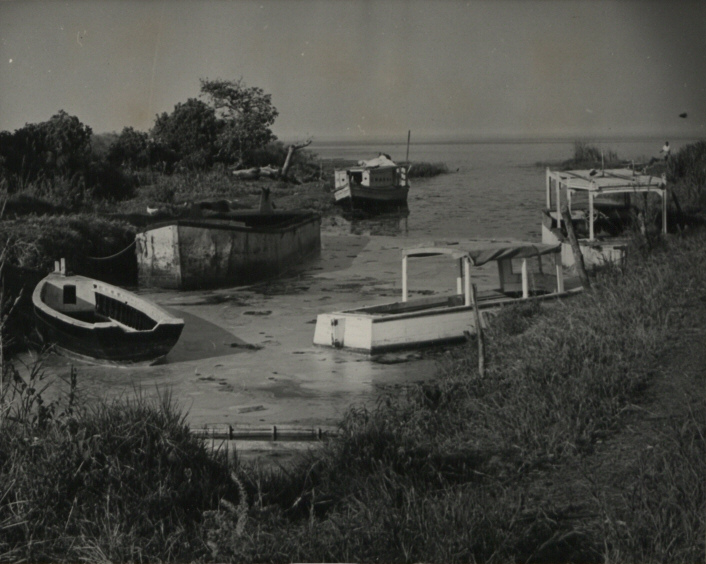
Samfya Harbour

Samfya is a town located in the Luapula Province of Zambia. It is the centre of Samfya District. The town is located on the south-western shore of Lake Bangweulu, on the longest stretch of well-defined shore of that lake (the northern, eastern and southern margins of which are marshy). Samfya has a few guesthouses and a number of white sandy beaches which are used for recreation, although the lake does have crocodiles.

In addition to local government offices and branches of national agencies, Samfya is a commercial and fishing centre, as well a centre for transport by boat to islands and other areas of the lake. Its hinterland includes farms and some timber plantations.

The Kwanga Festival of the Ngumbo people is held in Samfya in October.

== Roads ==
Samfya is on a tarred road opened in 1983 to link the Luapula Province to the Great North Road at Serenje. This includes the longest bridge in Zambia, the Luapula Bridge at the south-eastern corner of the district near where four districts meet: Samfya District, Kanchibiya District, Chitambo District and the Congo Pedicle, part of the Democratic Republic of the Congo. Gravel roads also connect Samfya to Twingi, Kapalala, and Lubwe.

== Samfya Beach ==
On the eastern shores of Lake Bangweulu lies Samfya Beach that is known to have the whitest sandy beach in Zambia with a stretch of 100 kilometres.

== Notable people ==
- Guus Til (1997), Dutch footballer
