= Chambeshi River =

Stream in Zambia, considered the source of the Congo River

Chambeshi River Chambezi River
- The Chambeshi River is the easternmost stream in red.

- Location within Zambia

Physical characteristics
- Source
  - coordinates: 11°28′S 30°21′E

Basin features
- River system: Congo Basin

The Chambeshi (or Chambezi) River of northeastern Zambia is the most remote headstream of the Congo River (in length) and therefore it is considered the source of the Congo River. (However, by volume of water, the Lualaba River provides a greater streamflow to the Congo.)

The Chambeshi rises as a stream in the mountains of northeast Zambia near Lake Tanganyika at an elevation of 1,760 metres (5,770 ft) above sea level. It flows for 480 km into the Bangweulu Wetlands, which are part of Lake Bangweulu. By the end of the rainy season in May, the river delivers a flood which recharges the wetlands and inundates the Zambezian grasslands to the southeast. The water then flows out of the wetlands as the Luapula River.

For more than 100 km of its length as it flows to the east of Kasama, the river consists of a maze of channels in wetlands about 2 km wide, in a floodplain up to 25 km wide. Further downstream, where it is bridged by the Kasama–Mpika road and the Tazara Railway, the permanent main channel is about 100 m wide, and up to 400 m wide in flood.
