= Samfya District =

- District
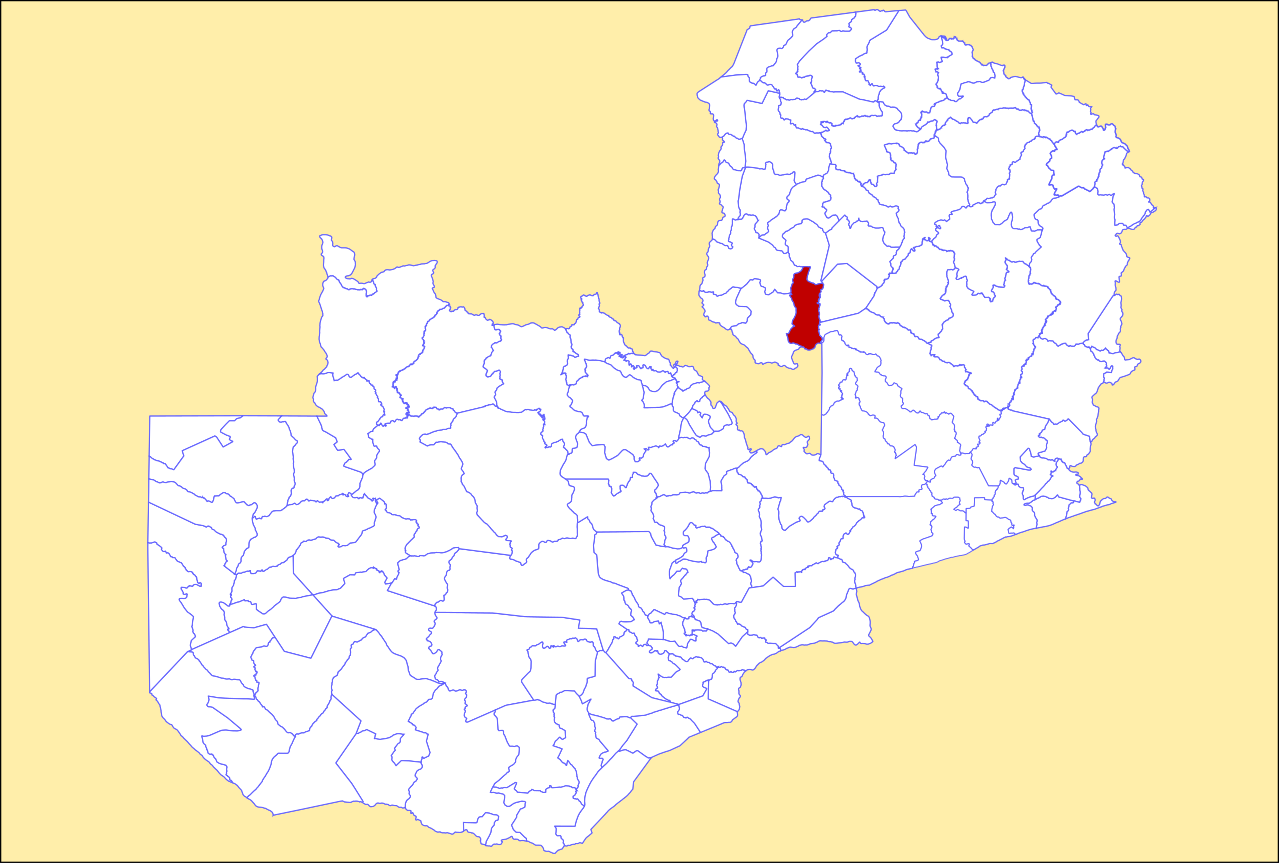
- District location in Zambia
- Coordinates: 11°30′S 30°00′E
- Country: Zambia
- Province: Luapula Province
- Capital: Samfya

Area
  - Total: 3,323.7 km^{2} (1,283.3 sq mi)

Population (2022)
  - Total: 147,189
  - Density: 44.285/km^{2} (114.70/sq mi)
- Time zone: UTC+2 (CAT)

Samfya District is located in Luapula Province, Zambia. The headquarters is at Samfya.

Most of Samfya District is lake, swamp of floodplain. It covers part of Lake Bangweulu and the Bangweulu swamps. The only extensive dry land is along its western edge where it borders Milenge and Mansa districts. There are numerous inhabited islands in the lake and swamps, as well as peninsulas almost entirely surrounded by water, such as the Twingi Peninsula.

As of the 2022 Zambian Census, the district had a population of 147,189 people.
