= Luwingu District =

Coordinates: 10°50′S 30°00′E

- District
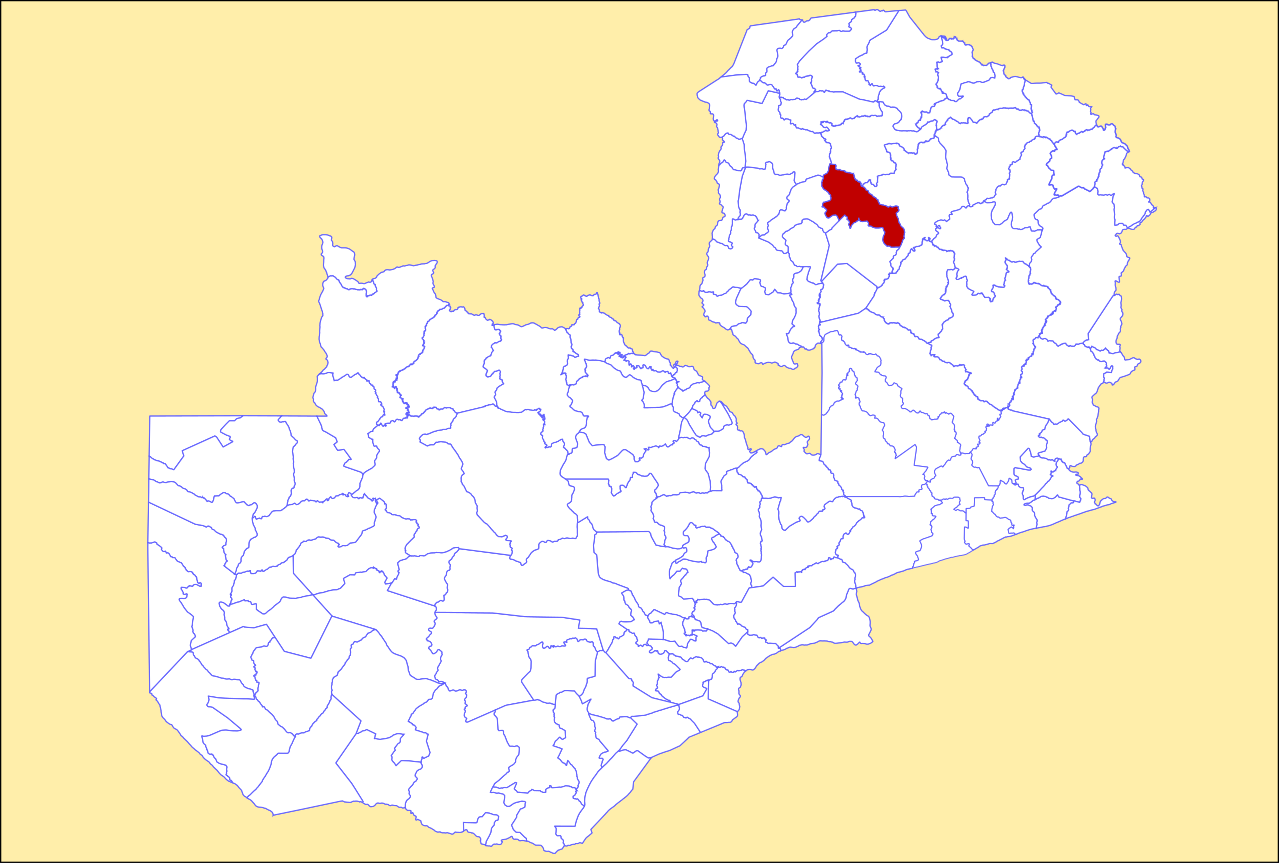
- District location in Zambia
- Country: Zambia
- Province: Northern Province
- Capital: Luwingu

Area
  - Total: 4,899.5 km^{2} (1,891.7 sq mi)

Population (2022)
  - Total: 101,142
  - Density: 20.643/km^{2} (53.466/sq mi)
- Time zone: UTC+2 (CAT)

Luwingu District is a district of Zambia, located in Northern Province. The capital lies at Luwingu. As of the 2022 Zambian Census, the district had a population of 101,142 people. It is one of the oldest districts of the Northern Province, being founded in 1906.
