= Kanchibiya District =

- District
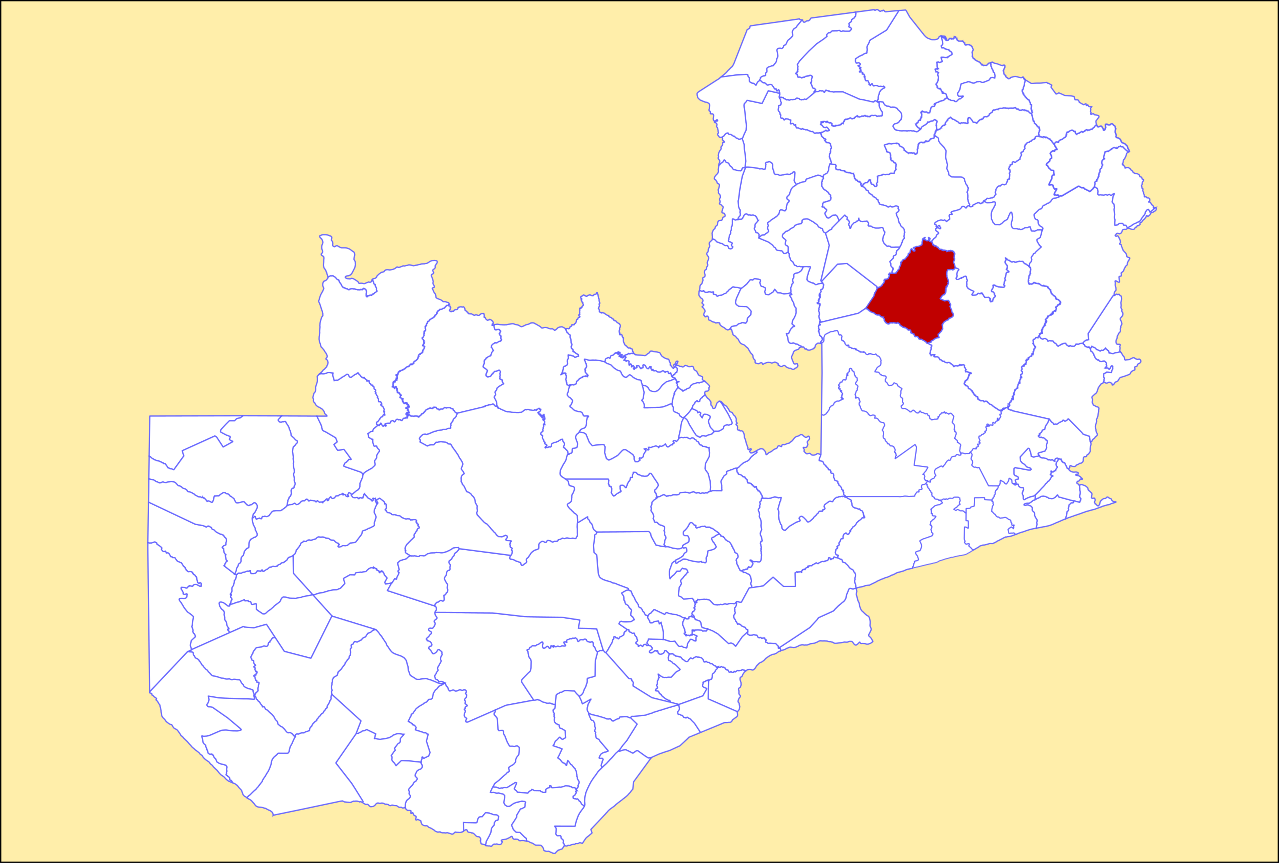
- District location in Zambia
- Country: Zambia
- Province: Muchinga Province

Area
  - Total: 8,917.7 km^{2} (3,443.1 sq mi)

Population (2022)
  - Total: 93,052
  - Density: 10.435/km^{2} (27.025/sq mi)
- Time zone: UTC+2 (CAT)

Kanchibiya District is a district of Muchinga Province, Zambia. It was separated from Mpika District in 2017. As of the 2022 Zambian Census, the district had a population of 93,052 people.
