= William Sikazwe =

Zambian military officer

Lieutenant General William Sikazwe
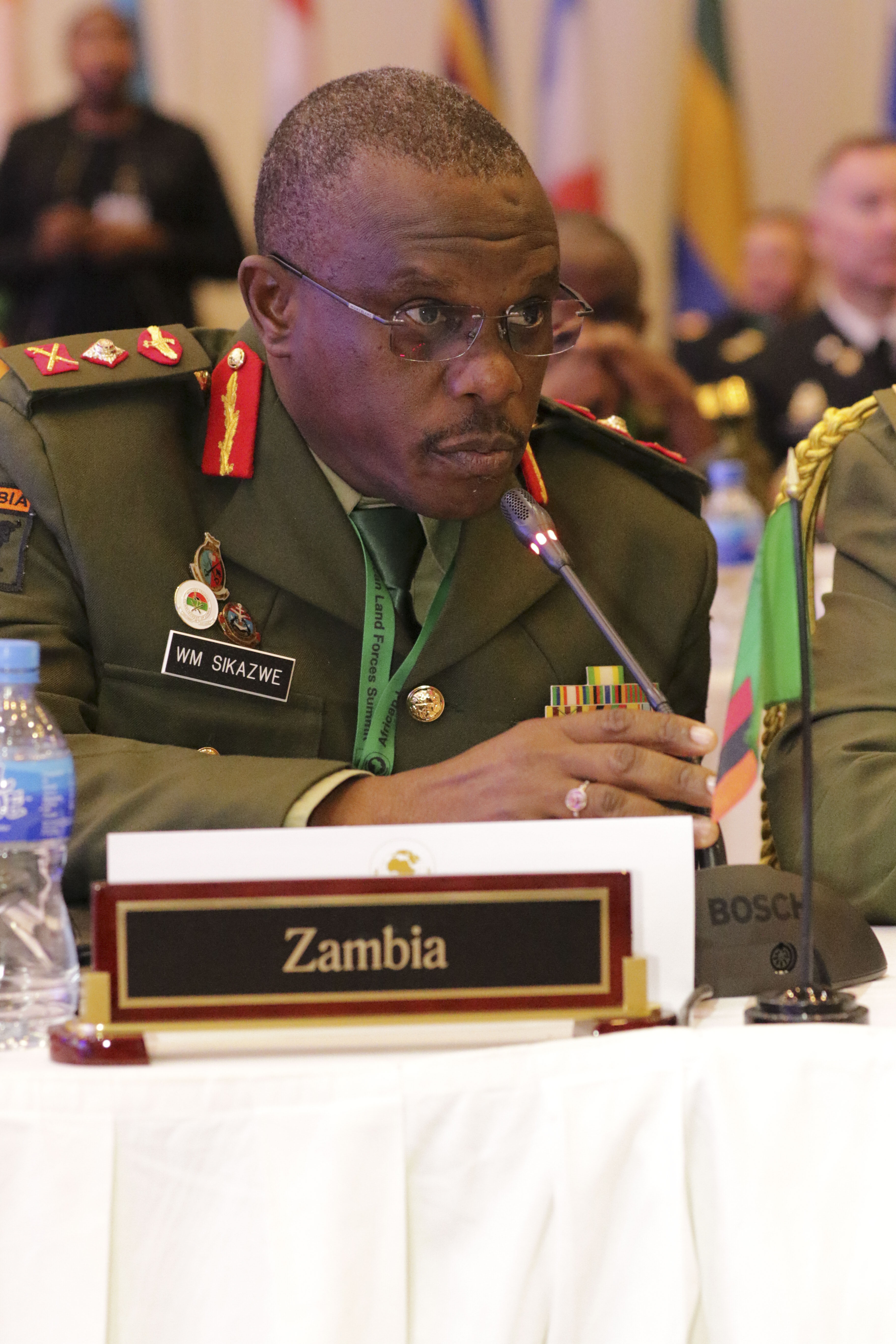
- Born: Zambia
- Citizenship: Zambia
- Occupation: Military officer
- Known for: Military
- Title: Commander of the Zambian Army

Lieutenant General William Sikazwe is a Zambian military officer who was the Commander of the Zambian Army until August 2021. He replaced Lieutenant General Paul Mihova, who together with his deputy, Major General Jackson Miti, were retired in the "national interest". The Zambian Army is one of the three components of the Zambian Defence Force.

Prior to becoming commander of the Zambian Army, Sikazwe served as the Chief of Operations of the Zambian Army. He was sworn into his new position, by the appointing authority, President Edgar Lungu, the Zambian head of state, on Monday 3 December 2018, at State House, Lusaka.

On 29 August 2021, the then newly elected president of Zambia, Hakainde Hichilema replaced Lieutenant General Sikazwe with Dennis Sitali Alibuzwi, who was simultaneously promoted from major general to lieutenant general. General Alibuzwi was the Chief of Staff and Deputy Army Commander under General Sikazwe. The president announced that General Sikazwe would be redeployed in a new, different role.

Military offices
| Preceded by Lieutenant General Paul Mihova | Commander of the Zambian Army; 2018 – 2021 | Succeeded by Lieutenant General Dennis Alibuzwi |
