= Commander of the Defence Force (Zambia) =

Former unified command position in the Zambian Defence Force

Commander of the Zambian National Defence Force
- Reports to: Minister of Defence
- Appointer: President
- Formation: 1976
- First holder: Kingsley Chinkuli
- Final holder: Benjamin Ndabila Mibenge
- Abolished: 1980
- Deputy: Deputy commander

The Commander of the Zambian National Defence Force was the professional head of the Zambian National Defence Force. They were responsible for the administration and operational control of the unified military. The position was abolished due to resentment from the Zambian Air Force and Zambia National Service, as most senior positions in the defence staff were filled by army officers.

== List of officeholders ==
No.	Portrait	Name (born–died)	Term of office			Ref.
No.	Portrait	Name (born–died)	Took office	Left office	Time in office	Ref.
1		General; Kingsley Chinkuli (born 1944)	13 June 1976	24 April 1977	315 days	
2		General; Benjamin Ndabila Mibenge (1942–2020)	31 December 1978	8 September 1980	1 year, 252 days	
