= Adamson Mushala =

Zambian insurgent and rebel leader (1935–1982)

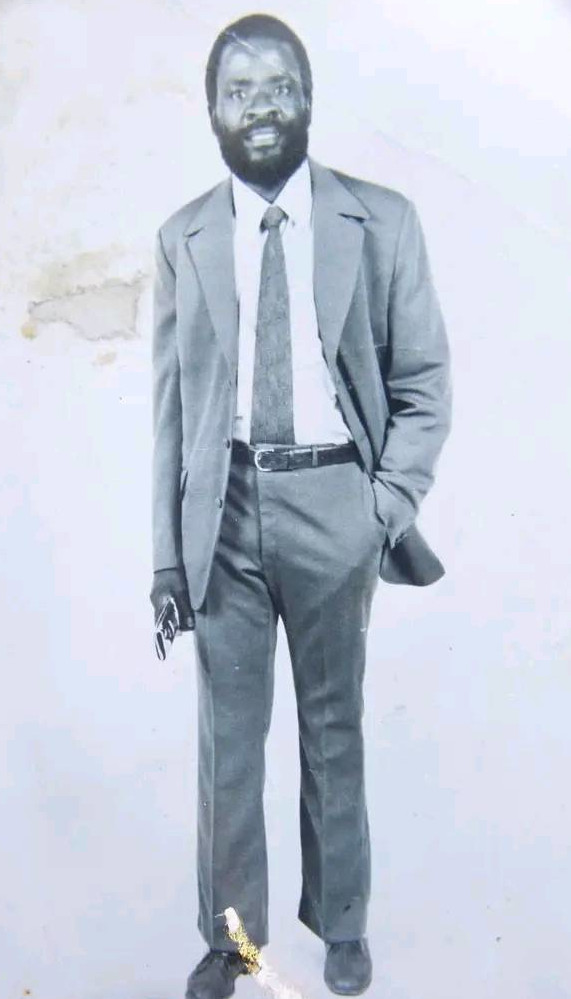
- A digitally cropped photograph of Adamson Mushala in 1975.
- Born: Adamson Bratson Musanda Mushala; 1935; Northern Rhodesia (now Zambia)
- Died: 26 November 1982 (aged 46–47); North-Western Province, Zambia
- Cause of death: Gunshot during military ambush
- Known for: Rebelling against the Government of Kenneth Kaunda

Adamson Bratson Musanda Mushala (1935–26 November 1982) was a Zambian insurgent who led a resistance movement against the one-party government of President Kenneth Kaunda from 1975 until his death in 1982, when he was killed by officers of the Zambian Army.

== Life and rebellion ==
Adamson Bratson Mushala was born in the North-Western Province of Zambia in 1935. In 1959, he married Rejoice at Chizela Bible School. Before engaging in open rebellion, Adamson Mushala was originally a member of the United National Independence Party (UNIP), where he participated in the fight against colonial rule. He was dispatched to China to receive guerrilla training, anticipating a return to combat the colonial government of Zambia. However, Zambia had already achieved independence by the time he returned. Mushala aspired to be appointed as the Minister of Tourism and Wildlife under the UNIP government—a request that President Kenneth Kaunda denied. Feeling frustrated and marginalized, Mushala left Zambia with a group of followers for South Africa and Namibia, to further hone his guerrilla skills.

Inspired by Jonas Savimbi's actions in Angola, Mushala returned to Zambia in 1975 and initiated a rebellion against the UNIP-led government, a campaign that continued until his death in 1982. He was reputed to have survived numerous attempts to capture or kill him, a feat attributed by some to witchcraft and supernatural abilities. Unconfirmed reports suggested that the Zambian government enlisted the help of witchdoctors, both locally and internationally, in unsuccessful attempts to capture him.

== Death ==
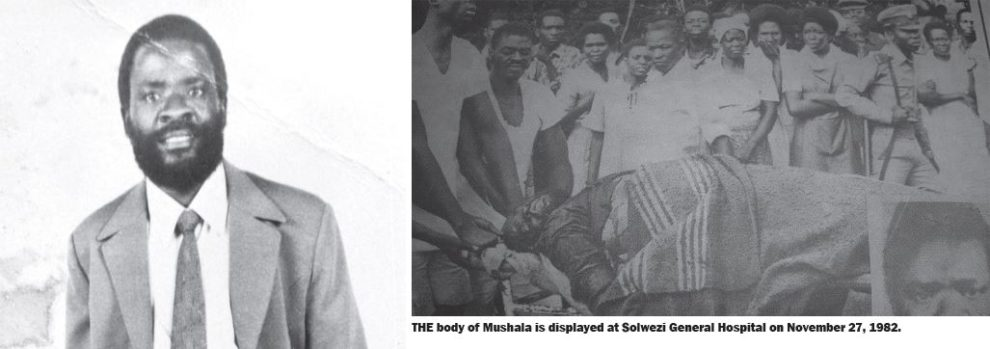
A cropped image from a Zambian newspaper showing Mushala's corpse being paraded

Adamson Mushala was killed in a military ambush on 26 November 1982. The incident took place near his camp in the West Lunga National Park in the North-Western Province near Solwezi, where his rebellion had its roots following a post-independence dispute in the 1960s. He was killed by a bullet that struck him through his eye. In a final display intended to confirm his death to the public, Mushala's body was displayed at Solwezi General Hospital for public viewing.

== Aftermath ==
Following the death of Mushala, leadership of the rebel movement was assumed by his second-in-command, Alexander Saimbwende, who carried on Mushala's insurgency until 25 September 1990. After engaging in talks with Alexander Kamalondo, who was then the Member of the Central Committee for North-Western Province, Saimbwende decided to cease hostilities. He was flown to Lusaka and subsequently received a presidential pardon from Kenneth Kaunda, marking the formal end to a long-standing resistance movement.

== See also ==
- Mwamba Luchembe
- Steven Lungu
