= Military ranks of Zambia =

The Military ranks of Zambia are the military insignia used by the Zambian Defence Force. Zambia is a landlocked country, and does not possess a navy. Zambia shares a rank structure similar to that of the United Kingdom.

== Commissioned officer ranks ==
The rank insignia of commissioned officers.

Rank group	General / flag officers				Senior officers			Junior officers
Zambian Army
Zambian Army	General	Lieutenant general	Major general	Brigadier	Colonel	Lieutenant colonel	Major	Captain	Lieutenant	Second lieutenant
Zambian Air Force
Zambian Air Force	General	Lieutenant general	Major general	Brigadier	Colonel	Lieutenant colonel	Major	Captain	Lieutenant	Second lieutenant
Rank group	General / flag officers				Senior officers			Junior officers

== Other ranks ==
The rank insignia of non-commissioned officers and enlisted personnel.

Rank group	Senior NCOs				Junior NCOs		Enlisted
Zambian Army							No insignia
Zambian Army	Warrant officer class 1	Warrant officer class 2	Staff sergeant	Sergeant	Corporal	Lance corporal	Private (or equivalent)
Zambian Air Force							No insignia
Zambian Air Force	Warrant officer class 1	Warrant officer class 2	Staff sergeant	Sergeant	Corporal	Lance corporal	Private (or equivalent)
Rank group	Senior NCOs				Junior NCOs		Enlisted

=== Senior appointments ===
Rank group	Senior NCO
Zambian Army
Zambian Army	Army sergeant major
