= Lieutenant-general insignia =

Military rank

This page shows the lieutenant-general insignia, by country, for the rank of lieutenant general in the different branches of the armed forces.

== Air force ==
Gjeneral lejtant
(Albanian Air Force)

Lieutenant général / Luitenant-generaal
(Belgian Air Component)

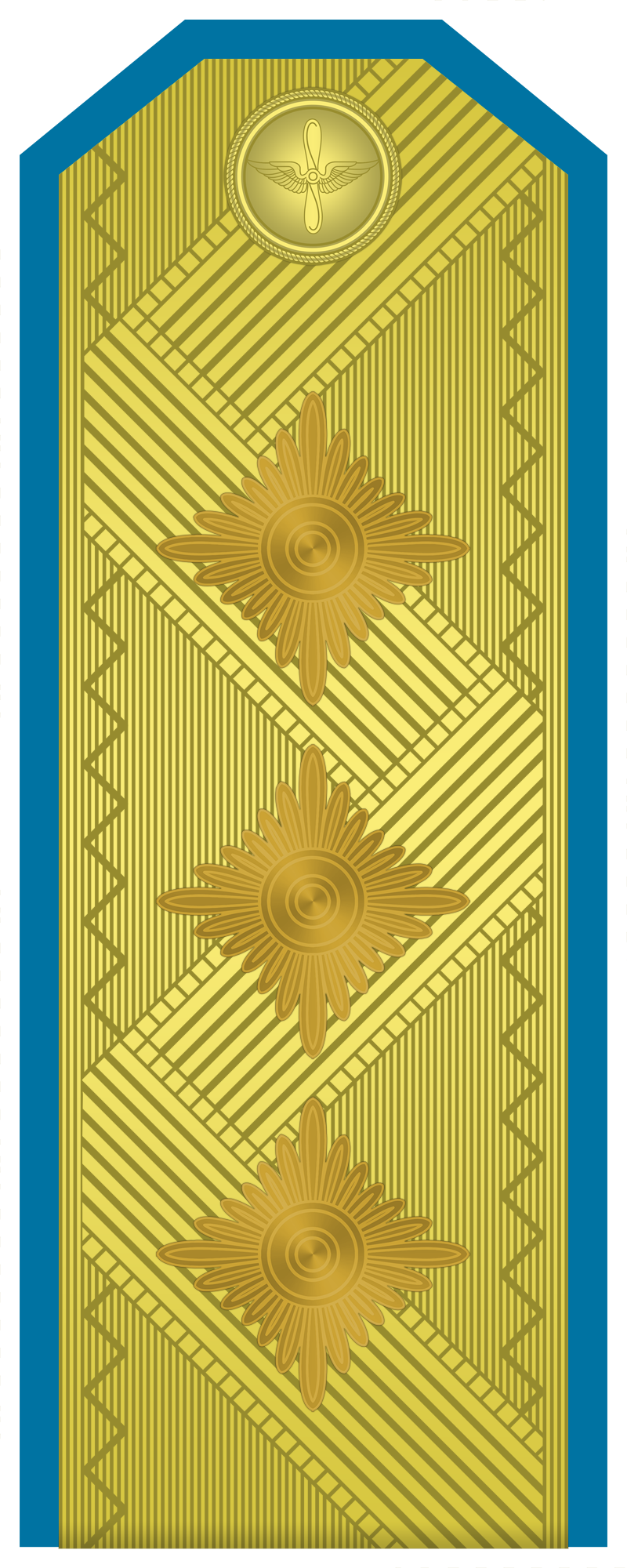
Генерал-лейтенант
(Bulgarian Air Force)

Generalløjtnant
(Royal Danish Air Force)

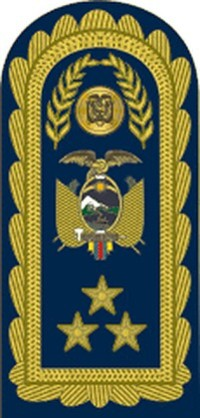
Teniente general
(Ecuadorian Air Force)

Kenraaliluutnantti / Generallöjtnant
(Finnish Air Force)

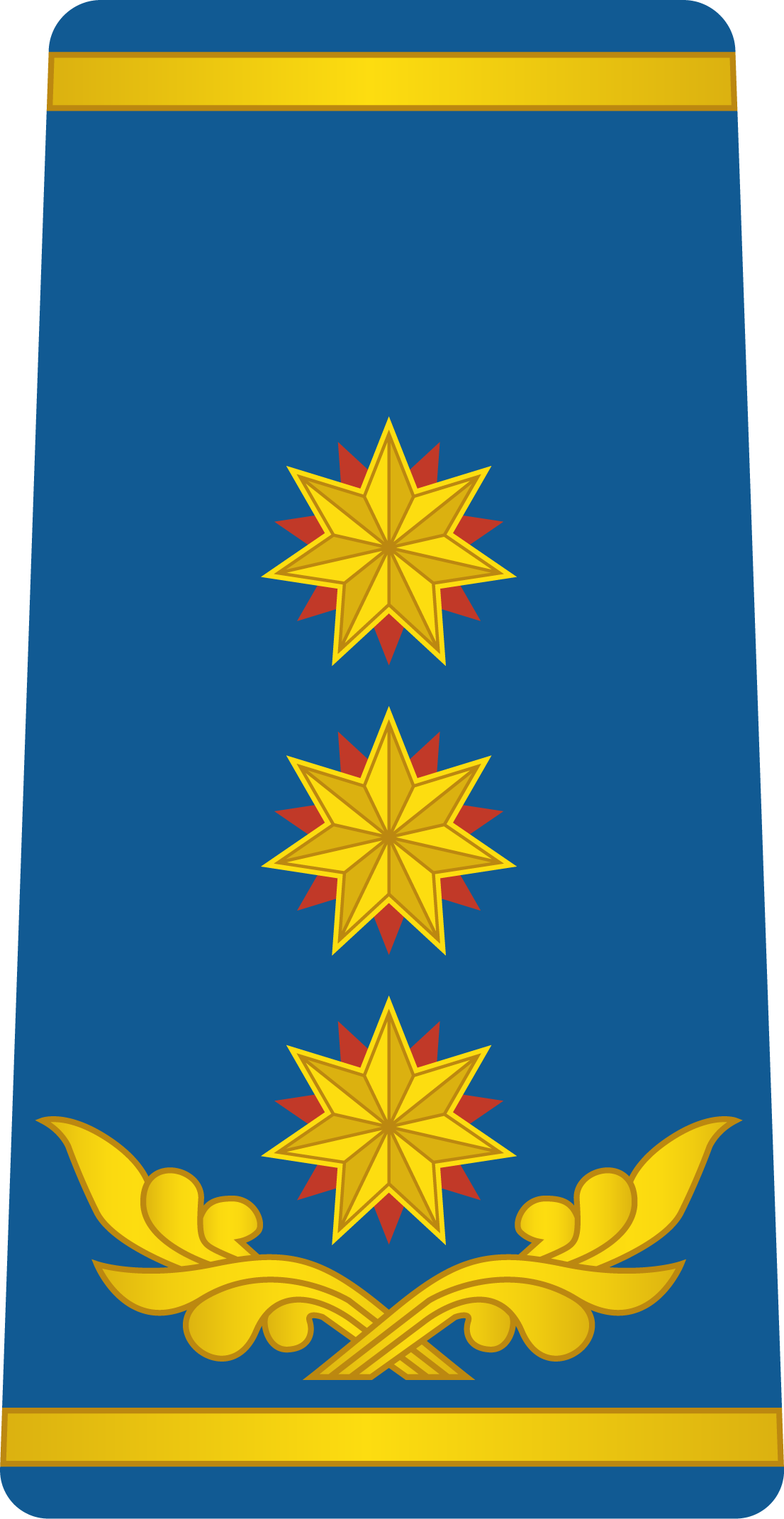
გენერალ ლეიტენანტი
(Georgian Air Force)

Luitenant-generaal
(Royal Netherlands Air Force)

Tenyente heneral
(Philippine Air Force)

Generał broni
(Polish Air Force)

Tenente-general
(Portuguese Air Force)

Генера́л-лейтена́нт
(Russian Aerospace Forces)

Teniente-general
(Spanish Air Force)

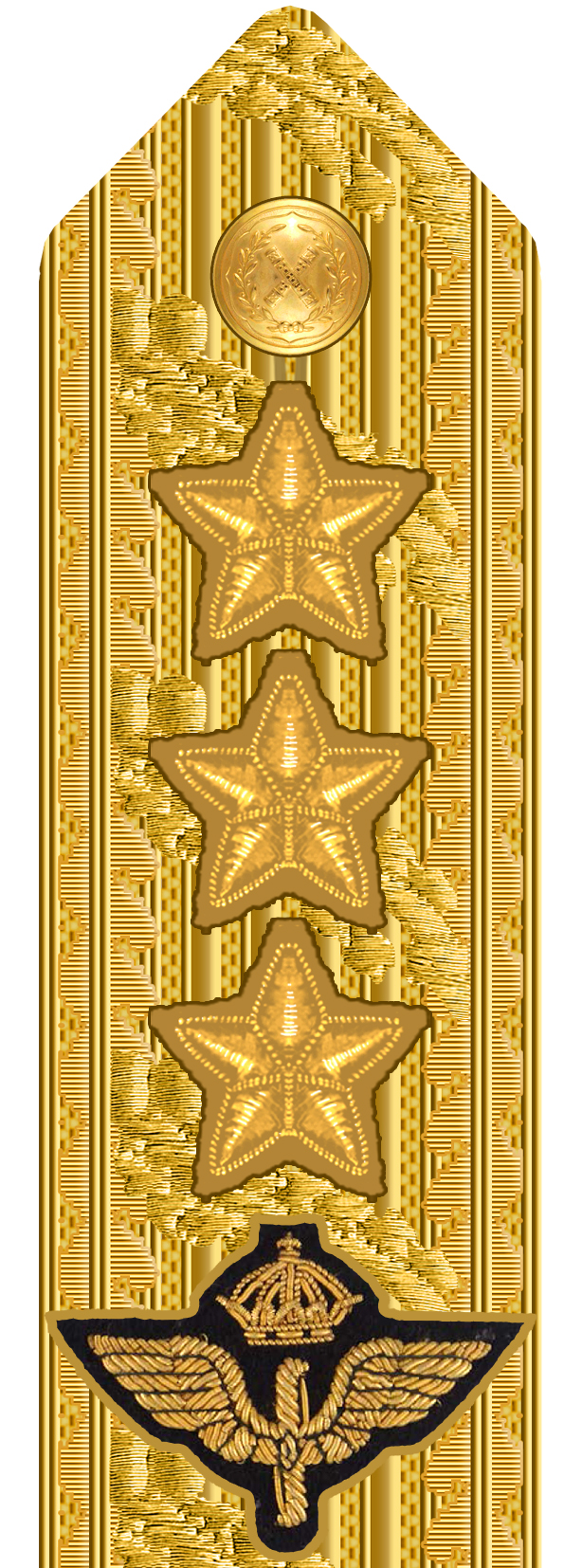
Generallöjtnant
(Swedish Air Force)

Korgeneral
(Turkish Air Force)

Генерал-лейтенант
(Ukrainian Air Force)

Lieutenant general
(United States Air Force)

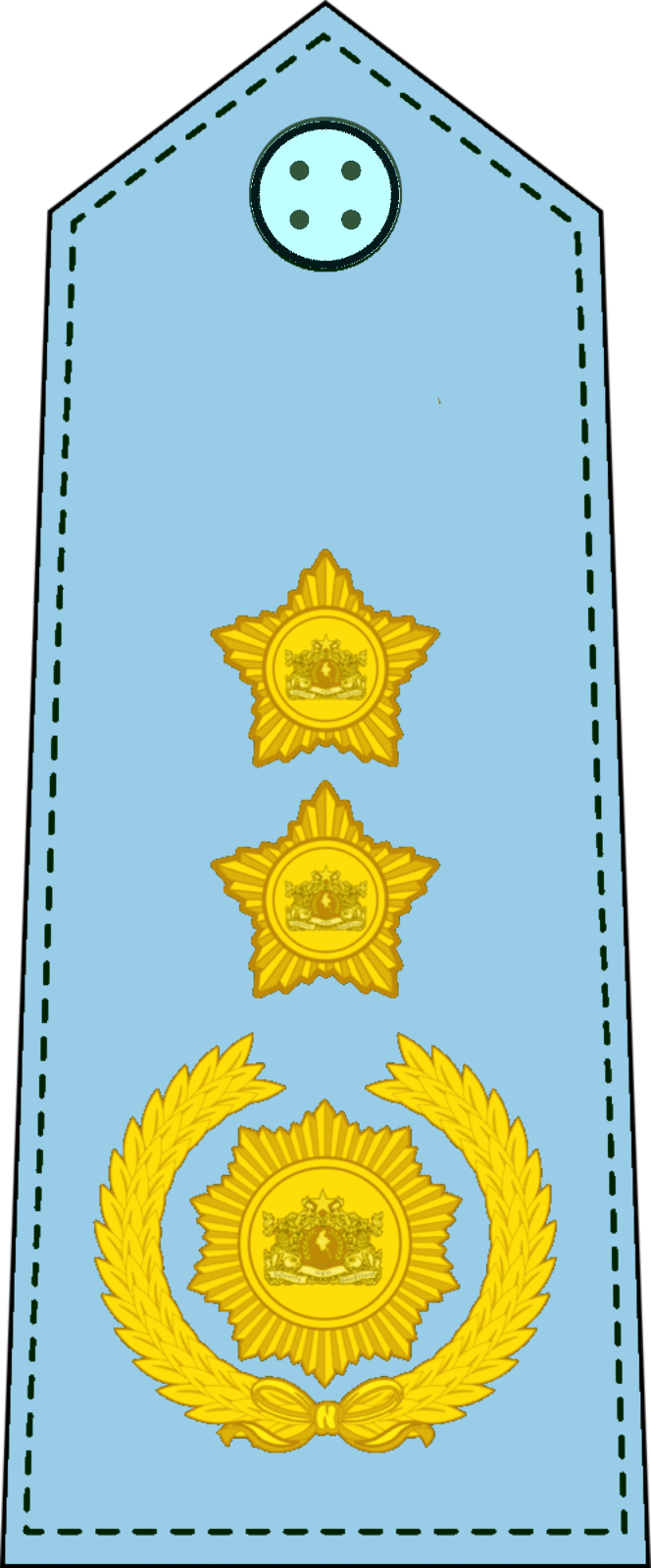
Air Marshal (Myanmar)

== Army ==
Gjeneral lejtant
(Albanian Army)

Tenente-general
(Angolan Army)

Teniente general
(Argentine Army)

գեներալ-լեյտենանտ
General-leytenant
(Armenian Ground Forces)

Lieutenant general
(Australian Army)

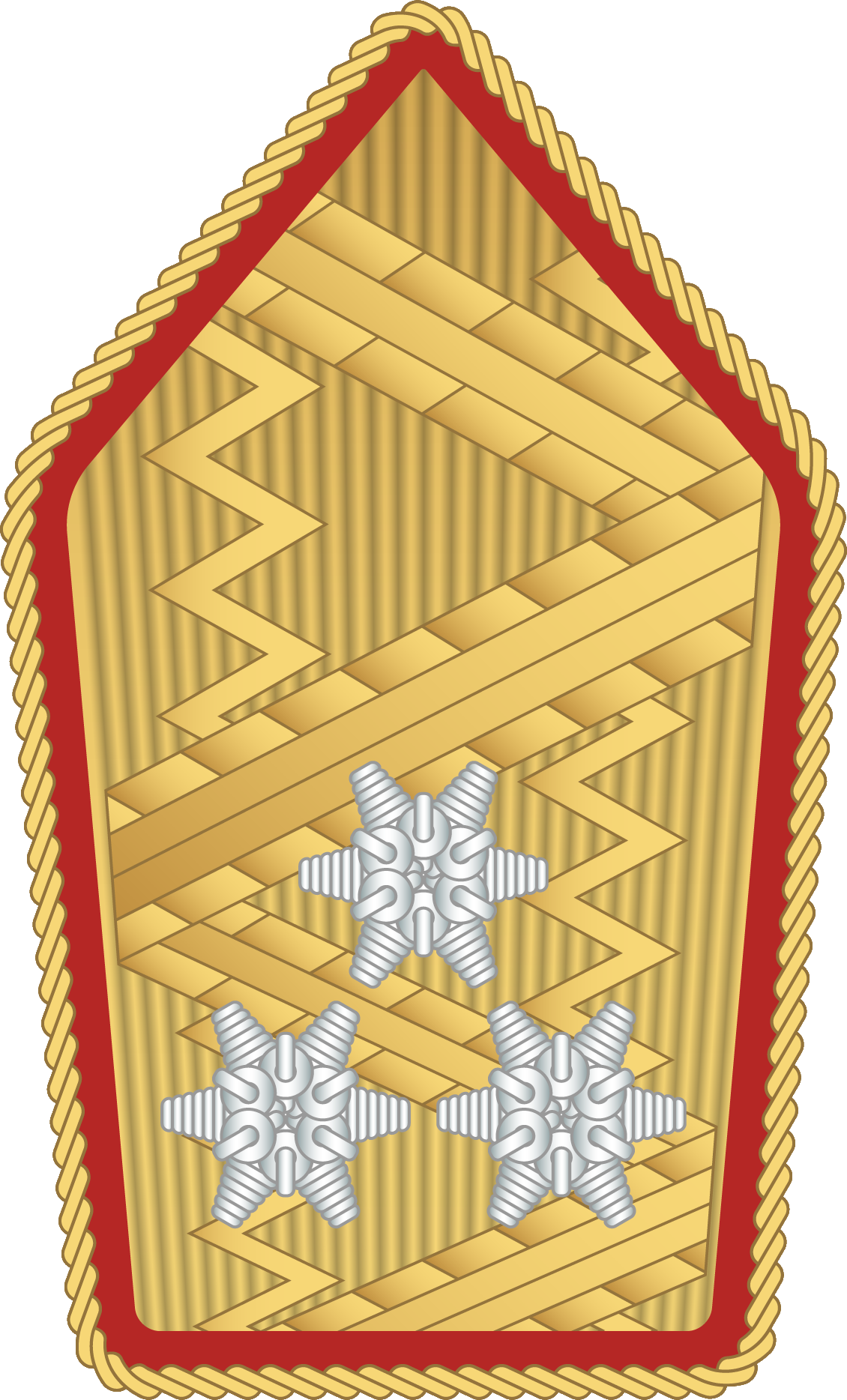
Generalleutnant
(Austrian Army)

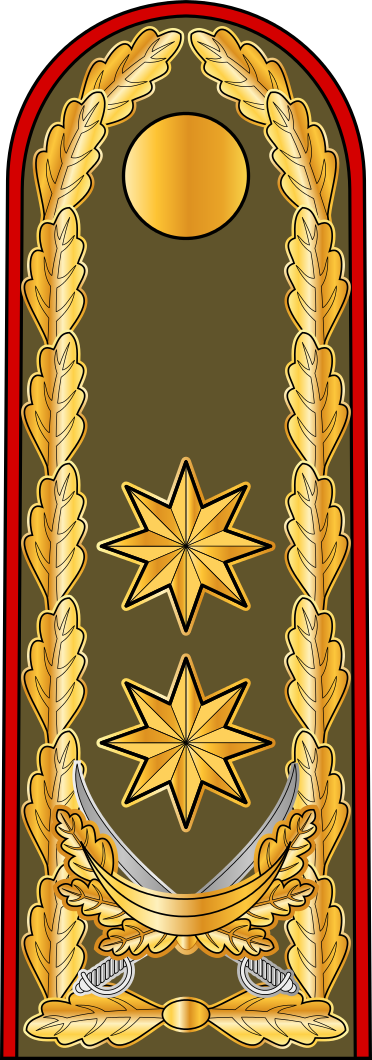
General-leytenant
(Azerbaijani Land Forces)

Lieutenant general
লেফটেন্যান্ট জেনারেল
(Bangladesh Army)

Ґенэрал-лейтэнант
G̀jeneral-liejtenant
(Belarusian Ground Forces)

Luitenant-generaal
(Belgian Land Component)

གུང་ བློན་ གོང མ །
Lieutenant general
(Royal Bhutan Army)

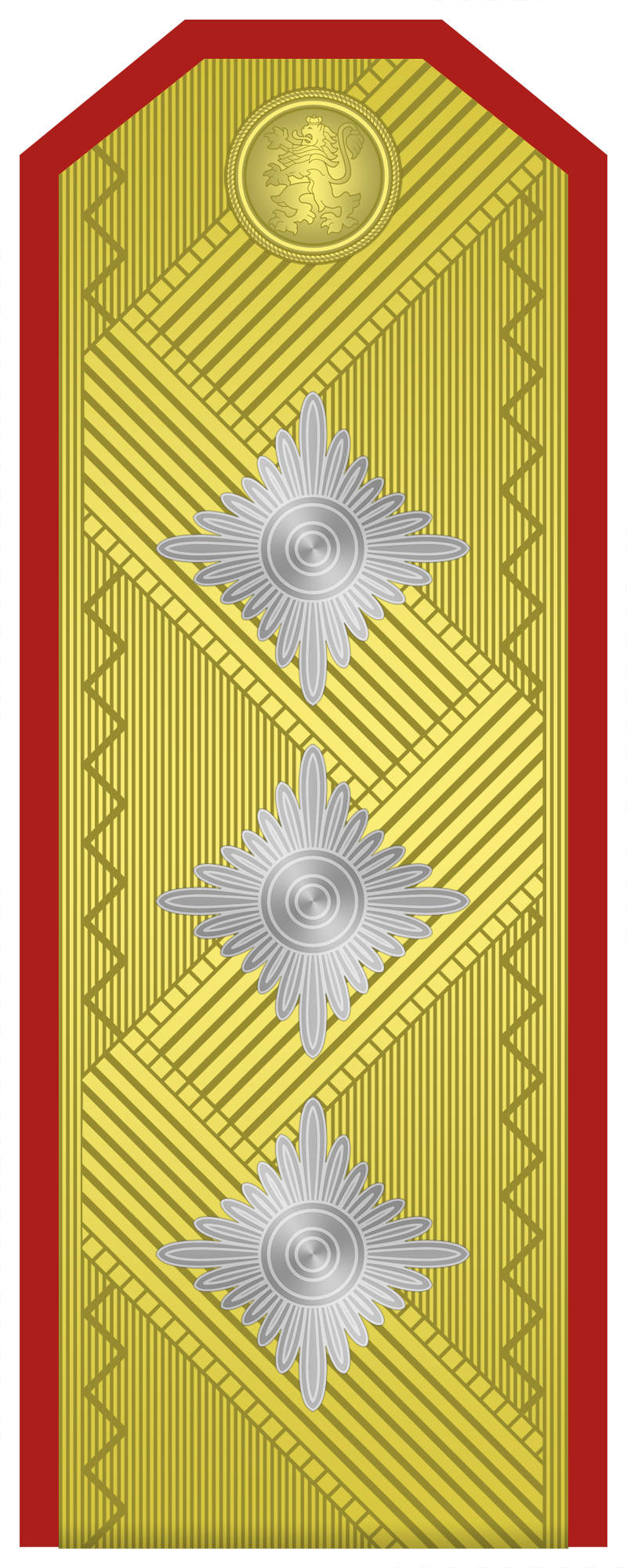
Генерал-лейтенант
General-leytenant
(Bulgarian Land Forces)

Lieutenant general
(Botswana Ground Force)

Leftenan jeneral
(Royal Brunei Land Force)

Lieutenant-général
Riyetena jenerai
(Burundi Army)

Lieutenant-general
Lieutenant-général
(Canadian Army)

Lieutenant-général
(Land Forces of the DR Congo)

Generálporučík
(Czech Land Forces)

Generalløjtnant
(Royal Danish Army)

Teniente general
(Dominican Army)

Kindralleitnant
(Estonian Land Forces)

Kenraaliluutnantti
Generallöjtnant
(Finnish Army)

Lieutenant general
(Gambian National Army)

გენერალ ლეიტენანტი
General leit’enant’i
(Georgian Land Forces)

Generalleutnant
(German Army)

Lieutenant general
(Ghana Army)

Tenente-general
(Army of Guinea-Bissau)

Lieutenant-général
(Haitian Army)

Lieutenant general
लेफ्टिनेंट - जनरल
(Indian Army)

Letnan jenderal
(Indonesian Army)

Lieutenant-general
Leifteanant-ghinearál
(Irish Army)

Tenente Generale
(Italian Army)

Lieutenant general
(Jamaican Army)

Генерал-лейтенант
General-leytenant
(Kazakh Ground Forces)

Lieutenant general
(Kenya Army)

Gjeneral lejtnant
(Kosovo Security Force)

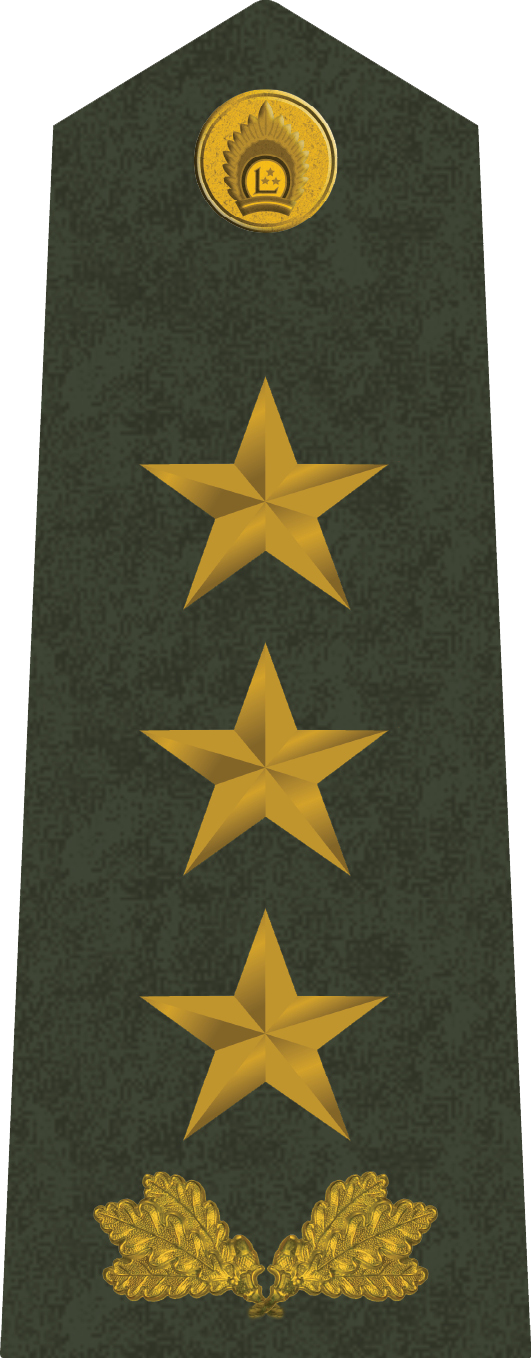
Ģenerālleitnants
(Latvian Land Forces)

Lieutenant general
(Lesotho Army)

Lieutenant general
(Liberian Ground Forces)

Generolas leitenantas
(Lithuanian Land Forces)

Lieutenant general
(Malawi Army)

Leftenan jeneral
(Malaysian Army)

Дэслэгч генерал
Deslegch gyenyeral
(Mongolian Ground Forces)

Tenente general
(Mozambican Army)

Lieutenant general
(Namibian Army)

Luitenant-generaal
(Royal Netherlands Army)

Lieutenant general
रथी
(Nepali Army)

Lieutenant-general
(New Zealand Army)

Lieutenant general
(Nigerian Army)

Generalløytnant
(Norwegian Army)

Lieutenant general
لیفٹیننٹ جنرل
(Pakistan Army)

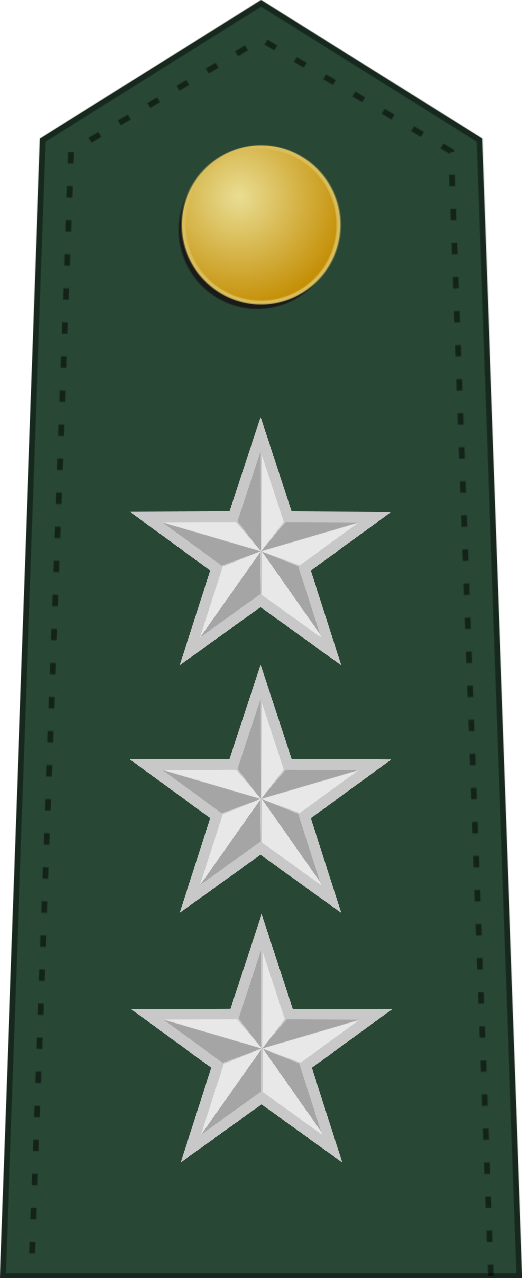
Lieutenant general
(Philippine Army)

Tenente-general
(Portuguese Army)

General-locotenent
(Romanian Land Forces)

Генера́л-лейтена́нт
Generál-leytenánt
(Russian Ground Forces)

Lieutenant general
(Rwandan Land Forces)

Lieutenant general
(Sierra Leone Army)

Lieutenant general
(Singapore Army)

Generálporučík
(Slovak Ground Forces)

Teniente general
(Spanish Army)

Lieutenant general
(Sri Lanka Army)

Lieutenant general
(South African Army)

Lieutenant general
(South Sudan Army)

Lieutenant general
(Eswatini Army)

Generallöjtnant
(Swedish Army)

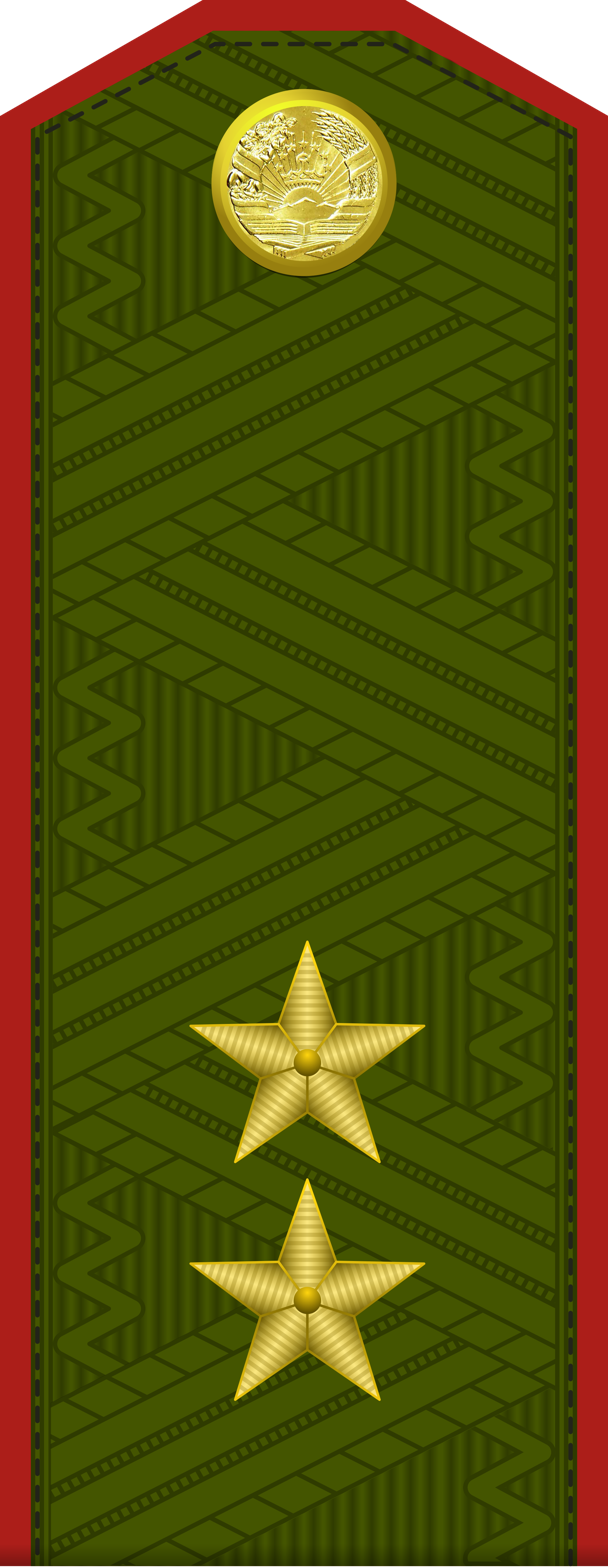
Генерал-лейтенант
General-lejtenant
(Tajik National Army)

Lieutenant general
Luteni jenerali
(Tanzanian Army)

Tenente-general
(Timor-Leste Army)

General-leýtenant
(Turkmen Ground Forces)

Lieutenant general
(Ugandan Army)

Генерал-лейтенант
Heneral-leytenant
(Ukrainian Ground Forces)

Lieutenant-general
(British Army)

Lieutenant general
(United States Army)

Teniente general
(National Army of Uruguay)

General-leytenant
(Uzbek Ground Forces)

Lieutenant general
(Zambian Army)

Lieutenant general
(Zimbabwe National Army)

Lieutenant General (Myanmar)

== Naval infantry ==
Teniente General
(Colombian Naval Infantry)

Letnan jenderal
(Indonesian Marine Corps)

ލެފްޓިނަންޓް ޖެނެރަލް
Lieutenant general
(Maldivian Marine Corps)

Lieutenant-generaal
(Netherlands Marine Corps)

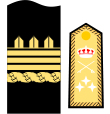
Teniente general
(Spanish Marine Infantry)

Generallöjtnant
(Swedish Amphibious Corps)

Lieutenant-general
(Royal Marines)

Lieutenant general
(United States Marine Corps)

Генерал-лейтенант
Heneral-leytenant
(Ukrainian Naval Infantry)
