= 1997 Zambian coup attempt =

Zambian failed Coup d'etat of 1997

1997 Zambian coup d'état attempt
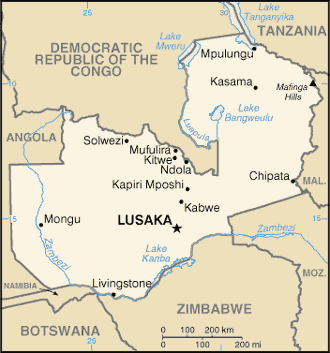
- A CIA WFB map of Zambia
- Date: 28 October 1997
- Location: Lusaka, Zambia
- Type: Military coup
- Motive: Regime change
- Organised by: Captain Solo (Steven Lungu)
- Outcome: Coup fails: Frederick Chiluba remains in power

The 1997 Zambian coup d'état attempt was a military coup d'état attempt that took place in Zambia on 28 October 1997. The coup lasted no more than 3 hours and took place between 6 and 9 A.M. when the coup's leader, Captain Solo (Steven Lungu) of the Zambian Army, announced via the ZNBC (national radio station) that a coup had taken place and that the then President, Frederick Chiluba, needed to step down.

Some international media organizations could not resist joking about the "aptly named" coup leader (Solo) whose demand that the President resign could be heard accompanied by laughter from radio journalists who were in the radio station at the time of the coup attempt.

After the coup attempt, 54 of the soldiers who took part were convicted and sentenced to death The sentence was appealed to Zambia's supreme court in 2003, which commuted the death sentence for ten soldiers but upheld the death sentence for the other 44. However in 2004, Zambia's president Levy Mwanawasa commuted the death sentence for 22 of the coup plotters and released 14 of them as having served their prison sentence. One of the coup leaders, Jack Chiti, was also released on humanitarian grounds due to cancer. Captain Solo spent 13 years in prison for committing treason and was released only in 2010 when it became clear that he was terminally ill.

== See also ==
- History of Zambia
- Bibliography of the history of Zambia
- 1990 Zambian coup attempt
