= Dennis Sitali Alibuzwi =

Zambian general

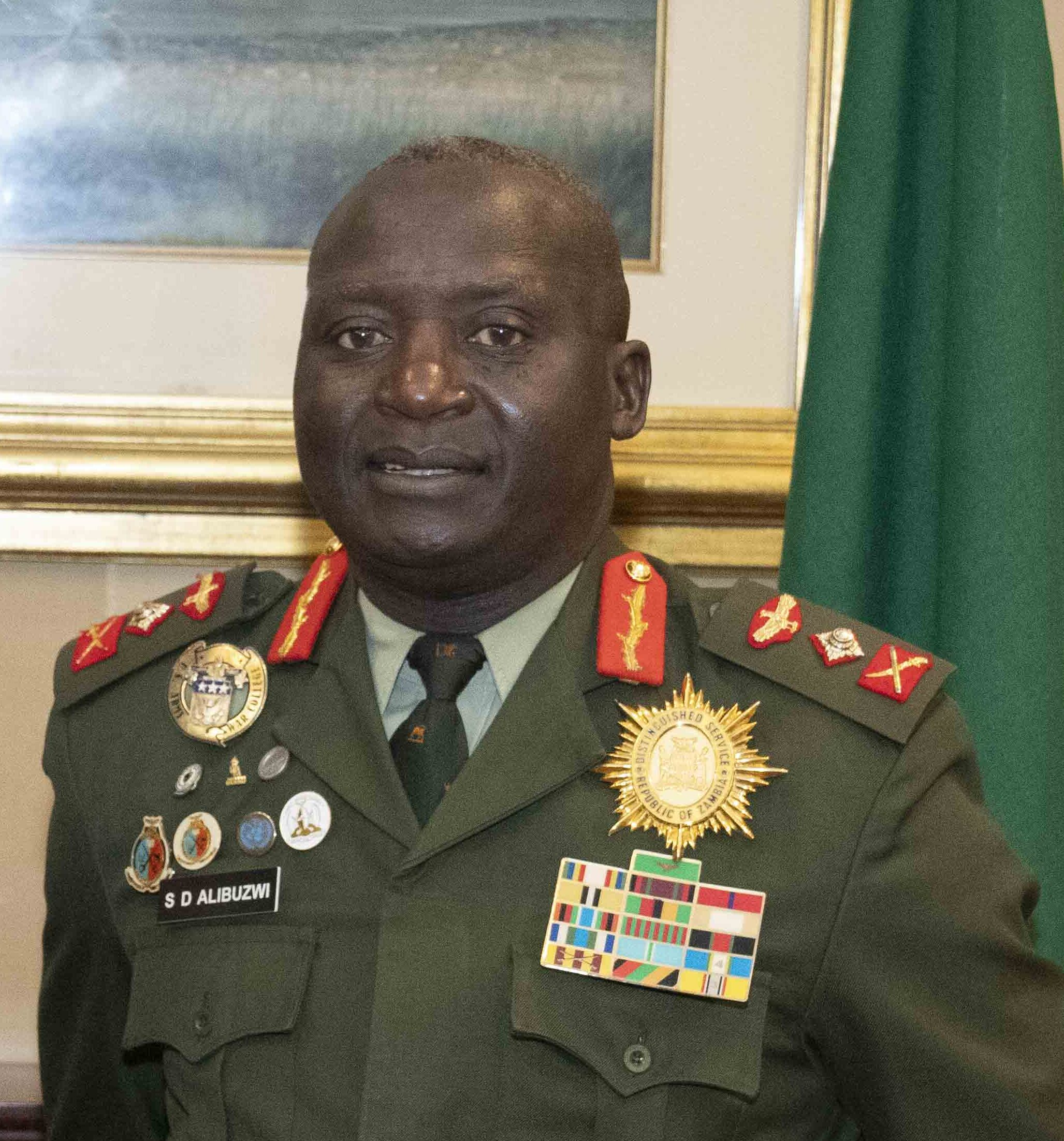
- Lt. Gen Alibuzwi in June 2024
- Born: 4 August; Zambia
- Rank: Commander of the Zambian Army
- Education: United States Army War College
Military offices
| Preceded by Lieutenant General William Sikazwe | Commander of the Zambian Army; 2021 – 2024 | Succeeded by Lieutenant General Geoffrey Choongo Zyeele |

Lieutenant General Dennis Sitali Alibuzwi, also Dennis Alibuzwi, is a Zambian military officer who served as the Commander of the Zambian Army from 29 August 2021 to September 12, 2024. He was promoted from the rank of Major General to Lieutenant General, on the day that he was appointed Commander of the Army. He replaced Lieutenant General William Sikazwe, who served in that role between December 2018 and August 2021. The Zambian Army is one of the three components of the Zambian Defence Force.

Before he became Army Commander, he was the Deputy Commander of the Zambian Amy, at the rank of Major General, from January 2019 until August 2021. He was sworn in as Deputy Commander of the Army on 2 January 2019, by President Edgar Lungu, the appointing authority. His ADC when he was Army Commander was Captain Fortune Himanje, a young upright Officer from the Corp of Infantry.
