= Kingsley Chinkuli =

First indigenous Zambia Army Commander

Gen Kingsley Chinkuli
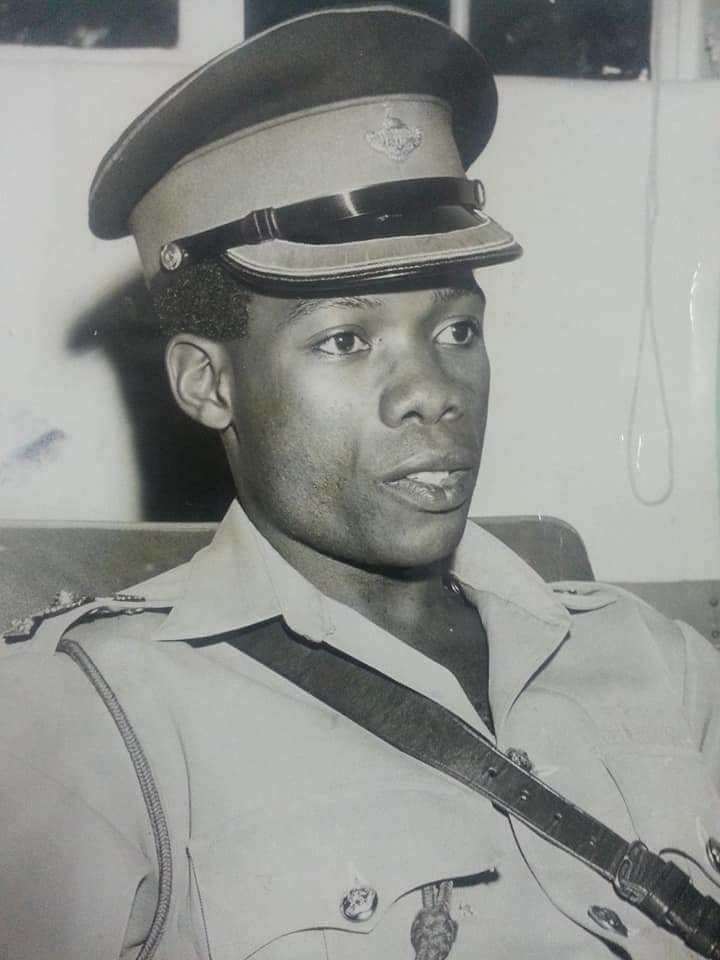
- Born: Godwin Kingsley Chinkuli; 1944 (age 81–82); Liteta Village, Central Province
- Education: Royal Military Academy Sandhurst
- Military career
- Allegiance: Zambia
- Branch: Zambia Army; Zambia Air Force; Zambia National Service
- Service years: 1960s – 1980s
- Rank: General
Military offices
Preceded by Major General TS Reids	Zambia Army Commander; 1970 - 1976	Succeeded by Post abolished
Military offices
Preceded by Post created	ZNDF Commander; 1976–1977	Succeeded by Lt Gen P D Zuze

General Kingsley Chinkuli is a retired Zambian military general who is the first indigenous Zambian Army Commander and was appointed on 28 December 1970, at the age of 27, by then President Kenneth Kaunda, taking over from Major General T.S. Reids after Zambia got its independence. This appointment marked a significant transition in the Zambian military, as leadership roles had previously been predominantly held by officers seconded from the British Army.

== Early life and military career ==
Born in Liteta Village, Central Province, Chinkuli emerged from the royal family of the Liteta Chieftainship. Despite his regal lineage, his childhood unfolded as a herdsboy, steeped in rural traditions. Cattle herding, hunting, and farming dominated his early years, punctuated by traditional training that instilled leadership traits and a deep sense of community responsibility. Chinkuli was one of the first three Zambians sent to the Royal Military Academy Sandhurst in the United Kingdom for officer military training. Upon completing his studies, he returned to Zambia and quickly advanced through the ranks. By 1976, he had become the Commander of the Zambia National Defence Force, overseeing the Army, Airforce, and Zambia National Service (ZNS), and also served as Deputy Minister of Defence. For six years, he expanded, grew, and improved the army. During his military career, he led efforts in the liberation struggles in the region, a mission that President Kaunda had committed the country to.

== Political roles ==
In 1977, Chinkuli transitioned to a political career, initially becoming Minister of Mines. In 1978, he was elevated to a full cabinet minister in charge of Power, Transport, and Communications. Throughout the next decade, he served in several ministerial positions, including Minister of Youth and Sport, Minister of Agriculture and Water Development, Minister of Labour, Social Development and Culture, and Minister of Home Affairs. He played a crucial role in overseeing Zambia's transition from a one-party state to a multi-party democracy in the 1990s.

== Personal life ==
General Chinkuli continues to contribute to national development. He is the Country Manager of First Quantum Minerals (FQM) in Kalumbila and remains active. Additionally, he has established the General Kingsley Chinkuli Foundation, which aims to provide welfare support and resources for ex-servicemen while promoting awareness of Zambia's military history and its connection to national development. The foundation was launched alongside his book, "Reigning In Chaos: Chinkuli and the Genius of Command," which reflects on his experiences and insights from his military career.
