= Luswepo Sinyinza =

Zambian military personnel

- Born: Luswepo Sinyinza; June 28, 1977; Solwezi, Zambia
- Military career
- Allegiance: Zambia
- Branch: Zambia Army
- Service years: 1995 – present
- Rank: Major General
Military offices
Preceded by Lieutenant General Geoffrey Choongo Zyeele	Deputy Commander of the Zambia Army; 2024 – present	Succeeded by Incumbent

Major General Luswepo Sinyinza is a Zambian military officer. He is the current Deputy Commander of the Zambian Army as well as the Chief of Staff since September 12, 2024.

== Career ==
On September 12, 2024, Brigadier General Sinyinza was promoted by President Hichilema to the rank of Major General. The President also appointed him as Deputy Force Commander and Chief of Staff of the Zambia Army, succeeding Geoffrey Zyeele who was promoted to the rank of Lieutenant General and appointed Zambia Army Commander.
