= 1990 Zambian coup attempt =

- Part of Kenneth Kaunda's fall from power
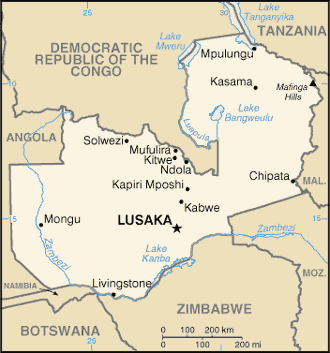
- A CIA WFB map of Zambia
- Date: July 1, 1990
- Time: 03:15
- Duration: 3-5 hours
- Location: Lusaka, Zambia
- Type: Military coup
- Cause: Economic crisis
- Motive: Regime change & Multi-party system
- Perpetrator: Mwamba Luchembe
- Outcome: Coup d'état unsuccessful
- Deaths: 0 to 3
- Verdict: Mwamba Luchembe and other perpetrators pardoned

The 1990 Zambian coup d'état attempt was a military coup d'état attempt that took place in Zambia on 1 July 1990. The coup lasted no more than 6 hours and took place between 3 and 9 A.M. when the coup's leader, Lieutenant Mwamba Luchembe of the Zambian Army, announced via the ZNBC (national radio station) that the military had taken over the government and he cited riots of the previous week as reasons for his action; about 27 people had died in the riots, while more than 100 were wounded.

The coup was in response to growing discontent with Zambia's single-party system under Kaunda's United National Independence Party (UNIP), as well as perceived economic mismanagement. Prior to the attempted coup, major inflation due to the government's sudden removal of all price controls and subsidies resulted in urban uprisings, which were brutally suppressed.

Although Lieutenant Luchembe's coup attempt against the then President Kenneth Kaunda failed, it weakened Kaunda's political power, which was already shaky after three days of rioting.

== Background ==
The Republic of Zambia was founded in 1963 from the dissolution of the Central African Federation, itself a formation from three colonial territories (Southern Rhodesia, Northern Rhodesia, and Nyasaland) that belonged to the United Kingdom. On 31 December 1963, the federation was dissolved, and Northern Rhodesia became the Republic of Zambia on 24 October 1964.

However ever since Zambia's independence, the country has been ruled by its first president Kenneth Kaunda under a socialist one-party system. The United National Independence Party (UNIP) was formed prior to independence in October 1959 as the successor party to the then-banned Zambian African National Congress (ZANC), where Kaunda later assumed power in 1960. In the following years, Zambia adopted a one-party rule system. In 1973 a constitutional amendment of Article 4 legalised the UNIP as the only legitimate party in Zambia.

=== Opposition to One-Party Rule ===
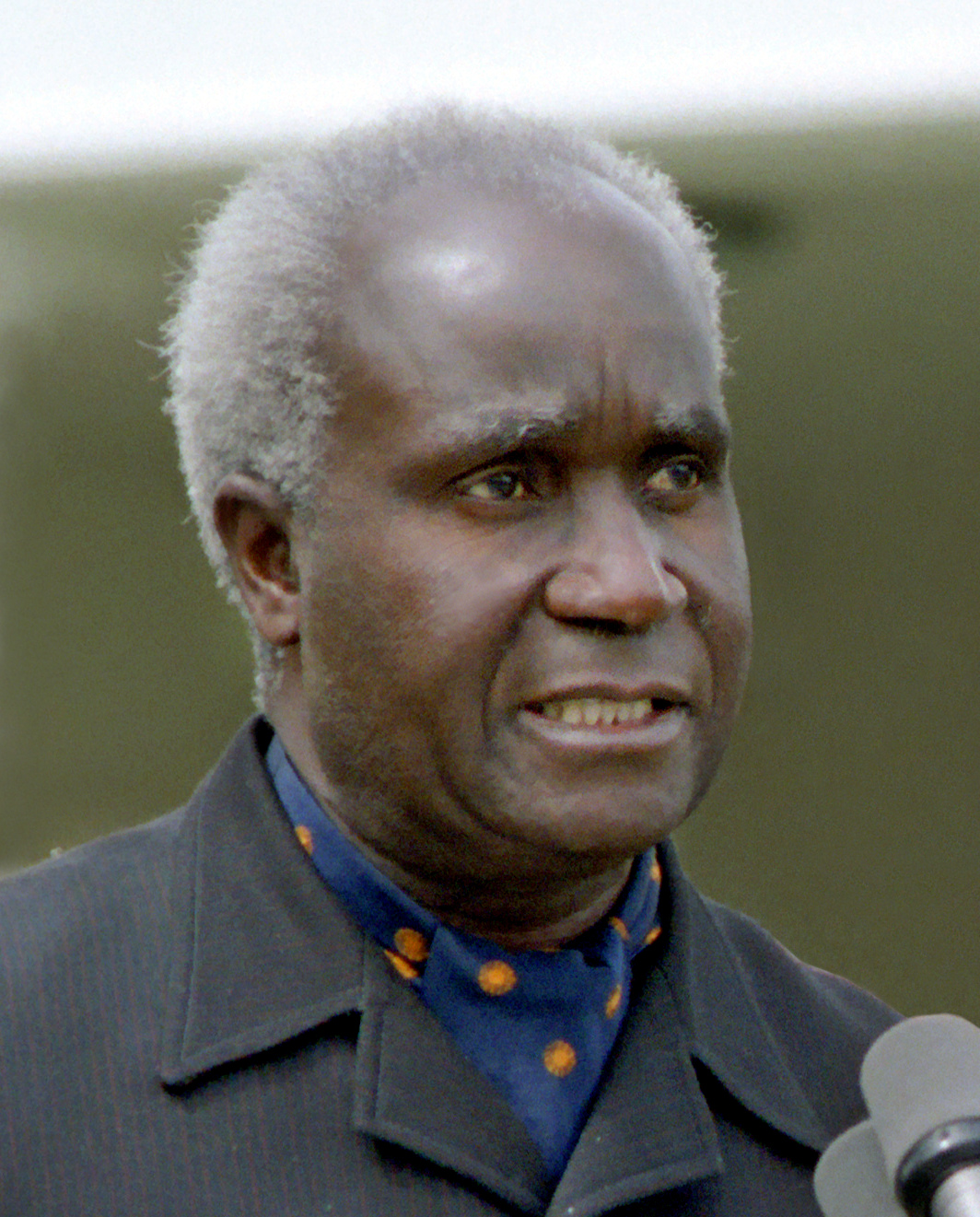
Kenneth Kaunda in 1983

In the beginning of one-party rule in Zambia, the UNIP was generally accepted by the majority of interest and social groups during the 1970s and the 1980s. Domestic political forces did not attempt to directly challenge the legitimacy of the party. Various labour movements and social groups instead lobbied and fought to secure their own interests based on corporate and class structures.

Starting in the 1980s; however, a burgeoning party bureaucracy that expanded under the Kaunda's rule contributed to the party's growing unpopularity. Many positions within the UNIP were created despite doubtful productivity; a 1977 Parliamentary Committee Report commented that an inefficient bureaucracy was placing a drain on the national economy. Popular discontent rose with perceived economic mismanagement as the left-wing socialist policies of the UNIP began to fail. Import substitution industrialisation (ISI) by nationalising key sectors allowed inefficiency and corruption to grow. Between 1975 and 1990, the economy of Zambia declined by approximately 30%. On 20 January 1980, 5,000 miners at the Konkola mine in Chililabombwe reacted by work stoppage. The rest of the mine labor force in the Zambian copper industry followed. The strike spread further to include postal workers in solidarity, as well as bank employees across the country when a union chairman was assaulted by local UNIP officials in Lusaka.

Initial reforms of the single-party system came within the UNIP party itself. Informal pressures from UNIP leaders and Kaunda were focused not on the complete abolishment of the system, but rather reform within the party. As the economic conditions worsened, more pressure was applied for reform by highly cohesive and autonomous civil society organisations, including unions and corporate interest groups. Furthermore, the international climate towards the end of the Cold War in the late 1980s represented a shift in the foreign aid system. Donor countries as well as international organisations began to insist that future aid would only be given on the condition of democratic political reforms.

At the same time, Kaunda was opposed to the introduction of multiparty elections and the complete abolishment of the single-party system in Zambia. He promised to personally campaign against the establishment of other parties, confident that he was able to persuade the National Council and the electorate of the disadvantages of a multi-party system.

The repeated blocking of reform and abolishment of the single-party system resulted in the collaboration of many centres of opposition: disenfranchised former UNIP members, churches, labour unions, and intellectuals. In 1990 these opposition groups united to establish the new Movement for Multiparty Democracy (MMD) party.

=== Economic Crisis ===
After a decade of economic mismanagement due to ineffective socialist policies from the UNIP, Zambia's foreign debt rose from U.S.$ 108 million in 1975 to U.S. $7.5 billion in 1990. Seeking loans on the international stage, the International Monetary Fund (IMF) and the World Bank insisted after 1984 that all credit facilities and development funds would be conditioned on the Zambian government's acceptance of extensive economic reforms, otherwise known as Structural Adjustment Programs (SAPs). The implementation of the IMF's austerity measures led to major inflation of prices, causing riots in cities across the country that marked the beginning of the end for Kaunda's regime. Inflation for low income groups grew from 20.1% in 1984 to 39.9% in 1985, and then 41.9% in 1986. Coupled with the introduction of the 'Kwacha' auction system in 1986 for goods and services caused a steep rise in the prices of essential commodities despite the government's attempt on price controls.

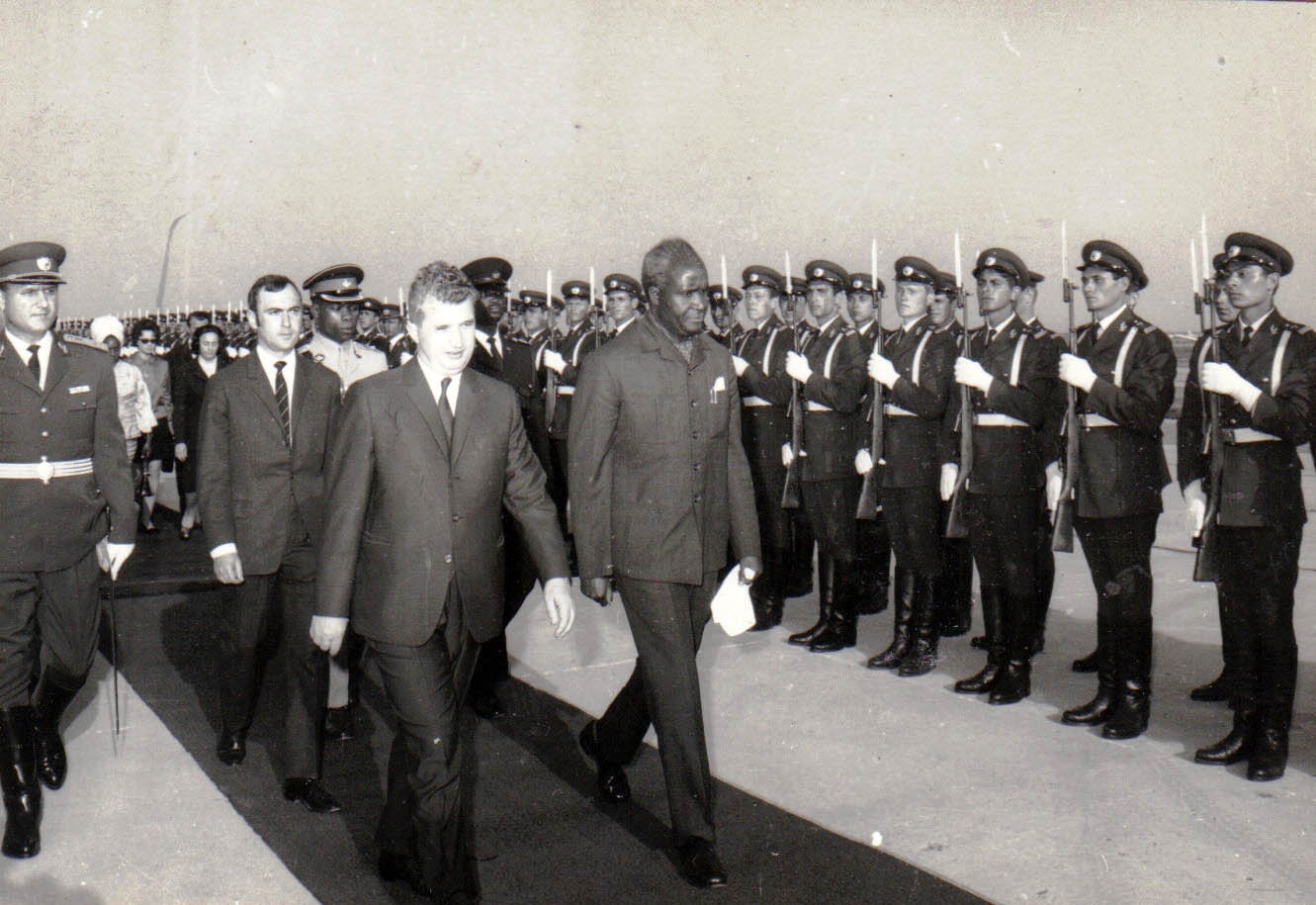
Kaunda in the Romanian SR in 1970

On 30 June 1989, the Zambian government entered negotiations with IMF to resume balance of payments support. In return, the IMF demanded the immediate deregulation of all market intervention policies within the economy. Rather than gradually reducing price controls and subsidies, the government instantly removed the price controls on almost all products in the economy. As inflation grew again to 129.9% in 1990, everyday essentials including cooking oil, salt, baby-foods saw yet another rise in price. Most importantly, the price of mealie-meal, a staple food in Zambia, doubled overnight on 01 July 1989. The direct consequence of these measures was a spontaneous uprising of urban populations in major cities. Riots against the increasing food prices occurred in major towns in the Copperbelt as well as Lusaka. The subsequent military and police crackdown led to 27 recorded deaths and many hundreds of casualties and arrests.

== Coup ==
In response to the atrocities committed by security forces in the aftermath of the food riots, a low ranking officer in the Zambian Defence Force, Lt. Mwambe Luchembe, took control of a radio station and other sites in Lusaka in the early morning of 30 June and formally declared a coup. For the next four hours, the occupied radio station announced that the UNIP and Kaunda's government had officially been overthrown in a coup. An armoured personnel carrier driving through Lusaka announced the same message on loudspeakers.

The reaction to the coup by the civilian population of Lusaka was immediate and highly positive. Crowds were gathered on the streets in support of the occupying military forces. In the city centre of Lusaka, crowds began calling for the removal of Kaunda with slogans such as "down with KK' and 'Kaunda is Dead'. Armed paramilitary groups who were deployed to protect state buildings and infrastructure against rioters also joined the celebrations.

After a few hours of the seizure and declaration of the coup, however; military units still loyal to Kaunda arrived in Lusaka and arrested Luchembe together with his small group of followers. Loyalist soldiers guarding Kaunda's presidential residence reportedly fired shots at celebrating civilians in the town centre, leading to three casualties in civilian clothing spotted by Western diplomats across the street. However, more recent analysis based on official Zambian reports has indicated that there were potentially no reported casualties as a result of the coup itself.

== Aftermath ==
Despite the brevity and the failure of Luchembe's coup, the events showed a deep dissatisfaction with UNIP and Kaunda's rule. Elements from both the military as well as civilian leadership was willing to support change at any cost. Contrary to the norm of other military coups elsewhere, the armed forces was not interested in taking political power as the Zambian military had remained on the periphery of national politics. Instead, they supported multi-party democracy as the only acceptable solution to the crisis while also calling for the removal of Kaunda. The coup attempted demonstrated to the ruling party the unpopularity of Kaunda's regime. Furthermore, the advocates for a multi-party system were emboldened by the attempt and as a result applied more pressure on Kaunda to resign and recommend political and economic reforms.

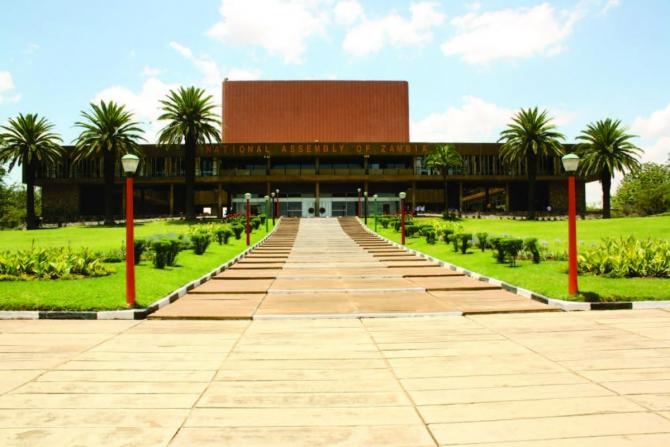
Zambian National Assembly Building

As a result of the broad popularity of the coup, Kaunda faced pressure to not persecute Luchembe and the rest of the coupists. In the interest of preventing further disunity, the central committee of the UNIP recommended Kaunda use his powers to pardon all political prisoners at the time. On the 25 July, Kaunda announced a "new era of reconciliation", and all soldiers who had been convicted of treason for their involvement in the 1980, 1988 and 1990 attempted coups were unconditionally pardoned and promptly released. This parole included Lt. Luchembe, who after his release claimed to have "buried the hatchet with the president", as he declared himself to be uninterested in politics. However, later he claimed that he himself managed to outmanoeuvre Kaunda's intelligence system, while he was let down by the other soldiers around him.

Nevertheless, the pardon eased the tensions between the party and the government. Both former coup plotters and the military concluded that the most effective method for introducing a multi-party system and the removal of Kaunda was through non-violent means. Trade unionists, church leaders, military officers, and NGO representatives alike organised mass rallies where they called for the introduction of multi-party democracy. On 08 July, Kaunda authorised the parliament to create a select committee in order to recommend reforms within the UNIP. On 13 July, the mineworkers' union declared its support for multi-party democracy.

On 24 September, Kaunda announced for the reintroduction of multi-party elections, and directed the National Assembly to appoint 45 members of the parliament to another special committee that would oversee the transition to a multi-party system. Consequently, by the end of 1990 multi-party elections were again permitted by an amendment to Article 4 of the Zambian Constitution, which had previously forbidden the formation of political parties other than the UNIP.

== See also ==
- History of Zambia
- Bibliography of the history of Zambia
- 1997 Zambian coup attempt
- Politics of Zambia
- Lusaka
