= ZDF (disambiguation) =

ZDF most often refers to Zweites Deutsches Fernsehen, a German broadcasting corporation.

ZDF may also refer to:

- Zambian Defence Force, the combined military forces of Zambia
- ZDF rat, a laboratory rat
- Zimbabwe Defence Forces, the combined military forces of Zimbabwe
