= Maliti Solochi =

Zambian military personnel

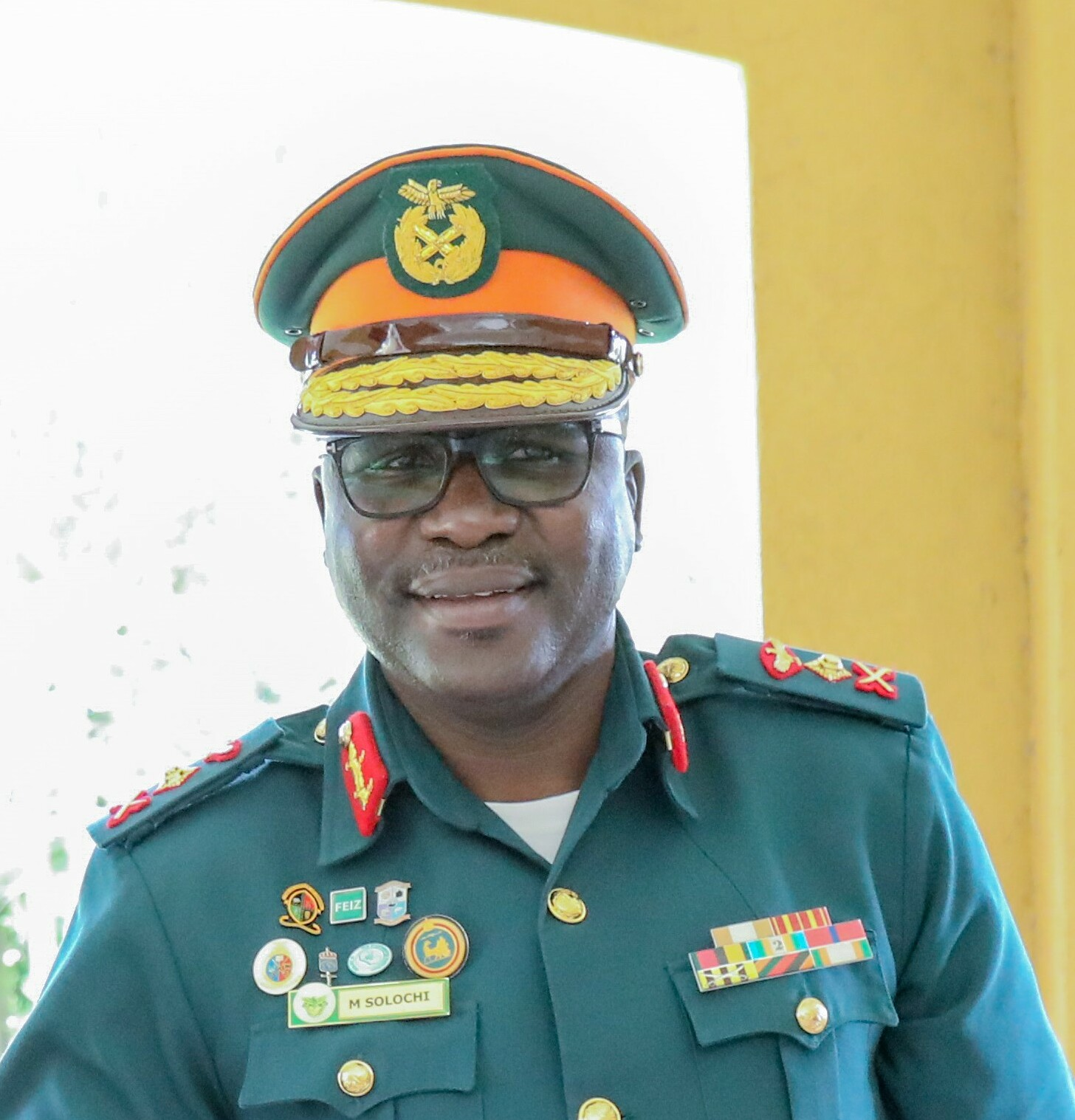
- Solochi in 2022.
- Born: Maliti Solochi; Lusaka, Zambia
- Children: 4
- Military career
- Allegiance: Zambia
- Branch: Zambia National Service
- Service years: 1990 – Present
- Rank: Lieutenant General
Military offices
Preceded by Lieutenant General Nathan Mulenga	Commander of the Zambia National Service; 2022 - Present

Lieutenant General Maliti Solochi II is a Zambian military officer and engineer who is the current commander of the Zambia National Service.

== Career ==
In 2021, Solochi was appointed Commander of the Zambia National Service.
