= Mwamba Luchembe =

Zambian politician

Personal details
- Born: Mwamba Luchembe; 1960 (age 65–66) Northern Rhodesia

Military service
- Allegiance: Zambia
- Branch/service: Zambia Army
- Rank: Lieutenant (Zambia)

Lieutenant Christopher Mwamba Luchembe (born 1960) is a former Zambia Army Lieutenant who staged the 1990 Zambian coup d'état attempt during the one-party state era of Zambian President Kenneth Kaunda in 1990. His action came amidst widespread calls for multiparty democracy.

On July 1, 1990 Luchembe announced in the radio studios of the Zambia National Broadcasting Corporation (ZNBC) that the Zambia Army had taken over the government and he cited riots of the previous week as reasons for his action; about 27 people had died in the riots, while more than 100 were wounded. Although Lieutenant Luchembe's coup attempt against President Kaunda failed, it weakened Kaunda's political power, which was already shaky after three days of rioting.

== Arrest ==
Lieutenant Mwamba Luchembe was captured by soldiers and was escorted from the Zambian National Broadcasting Corporation (ZNBC) radio studios and taken to the outskirts of the capital, Lusaka. "I wanted to take over the government but Kaunda's puppets are stopping me," he said, pointing to the soldiers surrounding him. "These are Kaunda's puppets."
