= Michael Grigg =

Major-General Casimir Michael Grigg CBE MC (25 February 1917 – 30 January 2015) was a British Army officer who won the Military Cross in Sicily in 1943. He was later appointed the first commander of the Zambian Army by first President Kenneth Kaunda, having risen to the rank of major in the British Army.

In January 1964, he took command of the Northern Rhodesia Army. In October 1964 Northern Rhodesia became independent as the Republic of Zambia.

He served until 1967 when he retired. He was succeeded by Major General T.S. Reids, who commanded in Zambia up to December 1970.
