= Geoffrey Choongo Zyeele =

Zambian military personnel

Geoffrey Zyeele
- Born: Geoffrey Choongo Zyeele; December 18, 1970; Lusaka, Zambia
- Military career
- Allegiance: Zambia
- Branch: Zambia Army
- Service years: 1990 – present
- Rank: Lieutenant General
Military offices
Preceded by Lieutenant General Dennis Sitali Alibuzwi	Commander of the Zambia Army; 2024 – present	Succeeded by Incumbent

Lieutenant General Geoffrey Choongo Zyeele is a Zambian military officer who has been force Commander of the Zambian Army since September 12, 2024, replacing Dennis Sitali Alibuzwi.

== Career ==
Brigadier General Zyeele, on August 29, 2021, was recalled from retirement and promoted to the rank of Major General and appointed Zambia Army Deputy Commander and Chief of Staff by President Hichilema.

On September 12, 2024, Major General Zyeele was promoted by President Hichilema to the rank of Lieutenant General. The President also appointed him as Zambia Army Commander, succeeding Dennis Sitali Alibuzwi who was subject to be redeployed by the President after his contract ran out.
