= Zambia National Service =

- Emblem of Zambia National Service
- Founded: 1963; 63 years ago 20 December 1971; 54 years ago
- Country: Zambia
- Type: Land force
- Role: Ground warfare
- Part of: Zambian Defence Force
- Headquarters: Lusaka
- Nicknames: Land Army; Green Army
- Mottos: "Sudor Et Sanguinis Pro Patria" (Latin) "Sweat And Blood For The Country"
- Colours: Army Green
- Website: Official Website

Commanders
- Commander-in-chief: Hakainde Hichilema
- Minister of Defence: Ambrose Lufuma
- ZNS Commander: Lt Gen Maliti Solochi
- Deputy Commander: Maj Gen Reuben Mwewa

The Zambia National Service, abbreviated ZNS, is part of the Zambian Defence Force, has been a cornerstone of national development since its establishment in 1971 through an Act of Parliament. Committed to the twin objectives of training civilian and safeguarding the territorial integrity of Zambia, the ZNS Act empowers them to prepare individuals to dutifully serve and protect the nation. However, it's not only about defense; ZNS also plays a vital role in imparting agricultural and craft skills to Zambians, promoting self-sufficiency and national prosperity. Originating in 1963 as the Land Army, ZNS has evolved into a dynamic force for national progress, underlining its multifaceted contribution to Zambia. Additionally, ZNS is also a major sponsor of Green Eagles football club.

== History ==
The history of the Zambia National Service (ZNS) evolves from a politically charged origin to a pivotal institution in Zambia's post-independence development and security. Established in 1963 by the United National Independence Party (UNIP) as the Land Army, it was intended as a military option in case independence negotiations failed. After Zambia peacefully gained independence on October 24, 1964, the Land Army was demobilized. However, on 20 December 1971, an Act of Parliament gave birth to a more militant ZNS. This transition included the addition of military training due to Zambia's involvement in the anti-apartheid struggle. By 1974, military training became compulsory for form five school leavers, university graduates, and government officials, but in 1980, the requirement for form five school leavers was discontinued and was almost reintroduced in 2013 by the Youth and Sport Minister, Chishimba Kambwili.

=== Origins as the Land Army ===
The ZNS traces its roots back to the Land Army, initially established as a potential militant wing of UNIP during Zambia's quest for independence. The Land Army served as a contingency force for a guerrilla military option, but Zambia peacefully achieved independence on 24 October 1964, making the armed struggle unnecessary.

=== Challenges of Post-Independence and Zambia Youth Service ===
The peaceful attainment of independence brought a new challenge – a sizable cohort of young, uneducated, and unemployed individuals from the Land Army. To address this, in 1965, the government initiated a skills training program to empower these youths with practical trades, enabling their reintegration into society. The Land Army transformed into the Zambia Youth Service, marking a shift toward productivity and inclusivity. This program, operating from 1965 to December 1971, represented a significant period of reform.

=== External Threats and the Birth of Zambia National Service ===
Zambia's involvement in supporting liberation struggles in neighboring Southern African countries led to external threats. Hostile forces from Southern Rhodesia (now Zimbabwe) and South Africa launched military raids and bombings on Zambian territory. To enhance defense capabilities, the government dissolved the Zambia Youth Service and officially established the Zambia National Service (ZNS) through an Act of Parliament on 20 December 1971. This date is now commemorated annually as Zambia National Service Day, symbolizing the transition from a youth-focused, skills-building program to a well-organized military force entrusted with safeguarding the nation's security. The history of the Zambia National Service reflects the nation's journey from its early aspirations for independence through the challenges of post-independence nation-building to its commitment to national security and development.

== Eagles Holding Company Limited ==
On 23 May 2024 ZNS launched Eagles Holding Limited comprises eight subsidiary companies, including, Eagles Alert Security Company, Eagles Plus Trading, Eagles Events and Advertisement, Eagles Exploration and Minerals, Eagles Fuels and Lubricants, Eagles Bus Services, Eagles Blocks and Pavers & Eagles Fumigation and Sanitation. The official launch took place at ZNS Chamba Valley in Lusaka. The event was graced by the Minister of Defence, Hon Ambrose Lwiji Lufuma, who highlighted the significance of the twin launch of Eagles Holding Group of Companies and Eagles Alert Security. The initiative, spearheaded by the ZNS, was established in 2022 with the dual aim of engaging in profitable business ventures to boost the nation's Gross Domestic Product (GDP) and create job opportunities for the youth. Eagles Plus Trading and Eagles Alert Security are fully operational. Lt Gen Solochi assured that all companies under Eagles Holding will adhere to the highest standards of professionalism, transparency, and corporate governance.

== Commandants and Commander ==
Since its inception, the Zambia National Service (ZNS) has primarily focused on the training of school leavers (Citizens) in a wide range of market-based, life-sustaining skills, primarily related to production. Consequently, the nomenclature "Commandant" was traditionally employed to denote the head of the organization. The term "Commandant" is typically associated with defense departments or entities primarily engaged in one specific leadership component, such as training or health, among others.

Recognizing the expanding diversity in its roles and deployments, the need arose to adopt a more encompassing and adaptable title. To this end, on 29 December 2021, the ZNS Council, which is entrusted by the President with the lawful administration of the Service's affairs, overwhelmingly approved the change in nomenclature. This significant decision marked the transition from "Commandant" to "Commander" as the official title of the head of the Zambia National Service.

The change in nomenclature became effective on 14 January 2022, following the conveyance of authority by the Ministry of Defence. This transition to "Commander" reflects the Service's evolving and multifaceted roles, underscoring its commitment to addressing a broader spectrum of responsibilities and challenges.

List of Commandants
| No. | Name | Term of office | | | Ref |
| No. | Name | Took office | Left office | Time in office | Ref |
|---|---|---|---|---|---|
| Commandants | | | | | |
| 1. | Maj Gen C J Nyirenda | 1971 | 1976 | 4 years, 168 days | |
ZNDF Commanders
| 1. | Gen G K Chinkuli | 13 June 1976 | 24 April 1977 | 315 days | |
| 2. | Lt Gen P D Zuze | 24 April 1977 | 31 December 1978 | 1 year, 247 days | |
| 3. | Lt Gen B J Mibenge | 31 December 1978 | 9 October 1980 | 1 year, 283 days | |
Commandants
| 1. | Maj Gen T. M. Fara | October 1980 | March 1988 | 7 years, 183 days | |
| 3. | Maj Gen D.S. Zulu | March 1988 | November 1991 | 3 years, 214 days | |
| 4. | Lt Gen W.J. Funjika | November 1991 | June 2002 | 9 years, 212 days | |
| 5. | Maj Gen M Mbao | June 2002 | September 2007 | 4 years, 273 days | |
| 6. | Maj Gen R. Chisheta | 1 December 2007 | 7 April 2010 | 2 years, 127 days | |
| 7. | Maj Gen A S Yeta | 7 April 2010 | 23 September 2011 | 1 year, 158 days | |
| 8. | Lt Gen Nathan Mulenga | 23 September 2011 | 30 August 2021 | 9 years, 339 days | |
| 9. | Lt Gen Maliti Solochi | 30 August 2021 | 14 January 2022 | 349 days | |
Commanders
| 1. | Lt Gen Maliti Solochi | 14 January 2022 | Incumbent | 4 years, 222 days | |

== ZNS Ranks ==
Table of ZNS Ranks at establishment in 1971 and current
| Commissioned | Commissioned |
|---|---|
| Commandant | Lieutenant General |
| Chief Master | Major General |
| Senior Master | Brigadier General |
| Assistant Senior Master | Colonel |
| Master | Lieutenant Colonel |
| Assistant Master | Major |
| Junior Master | Captain Lieutenant 2nd Lieutenant |
| NON—Commissioned | NON—Commissioned |
| Chief Prefect | Warrant Officer (Class One) |
| Prefect | Warrant Officer (Class Two) |
| Assistant Prefect | Staff Sergeant |
| Cadet Prefect | Sergeant |
| Service Man | Corporal Lance Corporal Service Men/Service Women |

== Key Functions and Pillars of ZNS ==
The Zambia National Service (ZNS) plays a crucial role in various military operations, working in conjunction with other branches of the defence forces. Its functions and objectives are guided by four key pillars, serving as the foundation for its ongoing transformation. During the inaugural address to the first session of the 13th National Assembly, the President of Zambia Hakainde Hichilema, emphasized several ideals that align with the four pillars that the ZNS diligently seeks to realize. Service personnel are encouraged to actively contribute to the government's and command's vision, demonstrating initiative and creativity to overcome potential challenges and surpass common productivity hurdles. These pillars are in harmony with the developmental agenda of the Zambia's current government, which positions the ZNS as a strategic force for development. The four pillars of the ZNS are:

- Training of Citizens: This pillar focuses on providing training to both citizens and service personnel, aligning with the directives of the Government of the Republic of Zambia.
- Infrastructure Development: The ZNS is involved in infrastructure development projects, contributing to the nation's growth and progress.
- Enhancing National Food Security: ZNS plays a pivotal role in enhancing national food security, addressing one of the critical needs of the country.
- Economic Development: The ZNS is actively engaged in economic development efforts, supporting initiatives that contribute to the nation's economic well-being.

=== Other Functions ===
In addition to its key pillars, ZNS is responsible for various other functions, which include:

1. Direction, Coordination, and Conduct of Military Operations: The ZNS is involved in planning, coordinating, and executing military operations in collaboration with other branches of the armed forces.
2. Training of Citizens and Service Personnel: The ZNS provides training as determined by the Government of the Republic of Zambia and the Administration branch.
3. Provision and Maintenance of Communication Systems: The ZNS ensures the availability and upkeep of communication systems within the service to facilitate effective communication.
4. Liaison with Other Services and Security Wings: The ZNS maintains close cooperation and coordination with other services and security wings on matters related to defense and security.
5. Employment in Tasks of National Importance: ZNS members are deployed in tasks of national significance, including disaster management and mitigation efforts.
6. Defense of the Republic and Agricultural Production: The ZNS is tasked with defending the Republic and actively participating in agricultural production to support national self-sufficiency.
