= Steven Lungu =

Zambian politician

- Born: Steven Lungu; 6 January 1962; Mansa, Zambia
- Died: 22 August 2012 (aged 50); Lusaka, Zambia
- Military career
- Allegiance: Zambia Army
- Service years: ?–1997
- Rank: Captain
- Nickname: Captain Solo

Steven Lungu (Captain Steven Lungu aka Captain Solo) (6 January 1962 at Mansa General Hospital in Mansa, Zambia – 11 August 2012) was a former Zambia Army Captain who in 1997 together with the late captain Jack Chiti attempted a coup d’état during the rule of the then-President, Dr Frederick Chiluba.

In the early hours of October 1997, the soldiers led by Captain Solo broke into an arms depot, assaulted army officers and then proceeded to seized state-owned Zambia National Broadcasting Corporation (ZNBC) studios. Solo claimed to be representing the National Redemption Council, and announced over state radio that he had taken over the country. He further informed his countrymen that he was dismissing the chiefs of the army and the police, and would give President Frederick Chiluba until 9 A.M. to surrender or be killed.

== Arrest, trial, and imprisonment ==
Captain Solo together with 54 others were arrested by the special government forces barely after three hours of taking over and an official announcement was broadcast to announce that the coup has been quelled.

In 2003 under the leadership of the late President Levy Mwanawasa, the long-awaited trial was over and 44 out of 54 soldiers were found guilty of treason by the High Court. They were sentenced to death by hanging, but they immediately appealed to the Supreme Court. In their appeal against the ruling, the soldiers argued that they were caught up in the coup unintentionally. During the trial Captain Solo, confessed to being the mastermind of the coup plot and begged for forgiveness. He was however adamant that he was right to try to overthrow Chiluba and his government because it was riddled with corruption.

Other people were also arrested and trialed in connection with the failed coup which included high-profile figures such as the first Republican President Dr Kenneth Kaunda, Princess Nakatindi Wina and opposition leader Dean Namulya Mung’omba.

== Release ==
Captain Solo received a presidential pardon after serving 13 years imprisonment by the fourth Republican president, Rupiah Banda, on 28 December 2010. Then-president Levy Mwanawasa had also exercised mercy on him by commuting his death sentence to a 20-year jail term. Solo said although he has walked back to freedom, he is economically bound and depends on a certain pastor for shelter, food and clothing.

== Death ==
Steven Lungu died on 11 August 2012, aged 50, at Kanyama Clinic, in Lusaka after a long battle with TB which had deteriorated his health since his release from prison. He was survived by three children.
