= Zambian Defence Force =

Military of Zambia

Defence Force of Zambia
- Founded: 24 October 1964
- Service branches: Zambian Army; Zambian Air Force; Zambia National Service

Leadership
- Commander-in-chief: Hakainde Hichilema
- Minister of Defence: Ambrose Lufuma

Personnel
- Active personnel: 15,150 (2022)

Expenditure
- Budget: $283 million (2023)
- Percent of GDP: 1.3 (2023)

Related articles
- History: Rhodesian Bush War; South African Border War; Mozambican Civil War; Capture of Lubumbashi
- Ranks: Military ranks of Zambia

Rank insignia of Warrant Officer Class 2 for the army of Zambia

The Zambian Defence Force is the military of Zambia. It consists of the Zambian Army, the Zambian Air Force, and the Zambia National Service. The defence forces were formed at Zambian independence on 24 October 1964, from constituent units of the dissolved Federation of Rhodesia and Nyasaland Armed Forces. During the 1970s and 1980s, it played a key role in a number of regional conflicts, namely the South African Border War and Rhodesian Bush War. Being a landlocked country Zambia has no navy, although the Zambian Army maintains a maritime patrol unit for maintaining security on inland bodies of water.

== History ==
=== Background and independence ===
The Zambian Defence Force had its roots in the Northern Rhodesia Regiment, a multi-ethnic military unit which was raised by the British colonial government and had served with distinction during World War II. In 1960, the constituent colonies of Northern Rhodesia, Southern Rhodesia, and Nyasaland were amalgamated into a self-governing British dependency known as the Federation of Rhodesia and Nyasaland. When the federation was dissolved three years later, the assets and personnel of its armed forces were integrated with those of its successor states, including Northern Rhodesia, which subsequently gained independence as Zambia. For example, Zambia received half the federal armoured car squadron as well as some light patrol aircraft. Zambia also inherited the command structures of the Northern Rhodesia Regiment as well as the Northern Rhodesian Air Wing, which formed the basis for the new Zambian Army and Zambian Air Force, respectively.

Relations almost immediately soured between Zambia and Southern Rhodesia, now known simply as Rhodesia, which had issued its own unilateral declaration of independence (UDI) in 1965. Reports that Rhodesian security forces had occupied Kariba Dam prompted Zambian President Kenneth Kaunda to mobilise the ZDF for the first time and deploy troops to the border. The ZDF was withdrawn when Kaunda received a guarantee that Zambia's supply of Kariba power would not be interrupted. Nevertheless, military tension between the two nations remained high, and border incidents resulting in civilian deaths occurred. In November 1966, Rhodesian troops fired across the border and killed a Zambian woman on the north bank of the Zambezi River. In January 1973, Zambian troops fired on a South African police patrol boat on the Zambezi. Shortly afterwards, Defence Minister Grey Zulu ordered that the ZDF return to the border in force. Later in the month Kaunda brought the first of several complaints before the United Nations Security Council charging that Rhodesian security forces were violating Zambia's sovereignty and territorial integrity with South African support. Tensions flared again when Zambian troops fired across the border and killed two Canadian tourists on the Rhodesian side of Victoria Falls in May 1973.

The increasing prospect of war with Rhodesia posed several unique security dilemmas for the ZDF. Firstly, Zambia lacked the manpower or conventional hardware necessary to provide a suitable deterrent to a Rhodesian incursion. It also remained dependent on a relatively small pool of white senior officers and technical personnel. After 1967 Kaunda's government began replacing them with foreign officers on contract, ostensibly to minimise the potential for conflicts of loyalty. Between 1967 and 1970 the majority of officers in the ZDF were seconded from the British Army. In 1971, the ZDF was finally prepared to appoint its first black army and air force commanders. Due to the white community's close ties with Rhodesia and South Africa, white Zambians were subsequently barred from voluntary enlistment and granted a blanket exemption from conscription.

Around September 1967, Kaunda made two requests to the United States for equipment for the Zambian Army, including long-range missile systems, but was rebuffed. More successful were Zambia's attempts to acquire its first combat aircraft, a number of Aermacchi MB-326 and SIAI-Marchetti SF.260s sourced from Italy; the first black Zambian Air Force pilots were trained by Italian instructors between 1966 and 1969. Italy also sold the ZDF helicopters and towed artillery.

=== Involvement in regional conflicts, 1968–80 ===
During the 1970s, Zambia began providing sanctuary for a number of revolutionary and militant political movements dedicated to overthrowing colonial and white minority rule elsewhere on the African continent. Guerrilla armies based in exile in Zambia included the People's Liberation Army of Namibia (PLAN) and the Zimbabwe People's Revolutionary Army (ZIPRA). These movements ultimately embroiled the ZDF in their own internal power struggles as well as direct clashes with foreign troops carrying out preemptive strikes. In 1968, the ZDF skirmished with Portuguese troops which had pursued a number of Angolan or Mozambican insurgents into Zambia. In September 1975, Zambian troops became locked in a firefight with insurgents of the Zimbabwe African National Liberation Army (ZANLA). The ZDF killed eleven ZANLA insurgents and later expelled that movement from Zambian soil. A year later, nearly two thousand disaffected PLAN insurgents in Zambia launched a mutiny which became known as the "Shipanga Affair". The army was forced to marshal several battalions to subdue the dissidents.

In response to Zambia's increasingly open support for PLAN, South Africa sponsored a force of Kaonde-speaking dissidents under Adamson Mushala, known as the Zambian Democratic Supreme Council (DSC). The DSC maintained a low level insurgency in Zambia's North-Western and Western Provinces. Mushala's guerrillas sabotaged infrastructure, skirmished with the ZDF, and collected intelligence on PLAN movements inside Zambia. They were trained by South African Special Forces and instructors recruited from the Portuguese Directorate-General of Security. In 1973, an army unit killed a hundred of the guerrillas by ambushing them as they attempted to cross the Zambezi near the Caprivi Strip. Mushala was largely inactive until early 1976, when his guerrillas skirmished twice with the ZDF and hijacked an army payroll.

As a result of the new challenges posed by the Mushala insurgency and the presence of foreign militants, the ZDF underwent an extensive reorganisation and adopted a new unified command structure. It was renamed the Zambian National Defence Force (ZNDF) in 1976. A prevailing feature of the new ZNDF was its adoption of a third branch known as the Zambian National Service. The objective of the Zambian National Service was to provide basic military instruction to all Zambian citizens in the event they needed to be mobilised as reservists during wartime. The ZNDF became increasingly politicised, with the ruling United National Independence Party (UNIP) forming party branches in the barracks and introducing a number of political education programs for military personnel. Under the UNIP, the ZNDF was not subject to public audit or parliamentary oversight. This was justified under the pretext that the ZNDF's development was tied to the exigencies of wartime.

Between 1977 and 1980 military tension with South Africa and Rhodesia continued to escalate, resulting in a renewed spate of border incidents. In 1977, the ZNDF bombarded Rhodesian positions near Victoria Falls with rocket and mortar fire. The reasons for the attack were disputed but the Zambian government maintained that the troops involved had been deliberately provoked by Rhodesian forces into firing. Around March 1978, the ZNDF claimed to have been involved in repelling a Rhodesian raid on a ZIPRA training camp. It also assisted PLAN insurgents during a raid on a South African military base in the Caprivi Strip. South Africa retaliated by shelling several ZNDF positions near the border, and Rhodesia began targeting ZNDF outposts. Growing Zambian war weariness was a significant factor in Kaunda's influencing the guerrilla movements in Rhodesia to seek peace, resulting in a negotiated end to that conflict. Kaunda also bowed to South African pressure and ordered PLAN to close its rear base facilities in Zambia by 1979. At the same time, the ZNDF embarked on a 70 million kwacha modernisation program with assistance from the Soviet Union. The Soviets provided the Zambian Army with tanks, wheeled armored vehicles, and technical instruction on especially generous terms; the Zambian Air Force received its first fighter aircraft in the form of a Mikoyan-Gurevich MiG-21 squadron at the same time.

=== End of the Cold War and reforms ===
In October 1980, two ZNDF officers, Brigadier Godfrey Miyanda and Colonel Patrick Mkandawire were arrested for planning a coup d'état with the support of an exiled Congolese insurgent movement, the Front for Congolese National Liberation (FLNC). The plot involved arming the FLNC with ZNDF weaponry and later providing that movement with rear operating bases in Zambia as a reward for their efforts if the coup succeeded. The ZNDF and the police apprehended the conspirators before they had opportunity to set the coup in motion and later raided the FLNC's base camp, detaining most of the insurgents.

Due in part to the extreme secrecy surrounding the ZNDF's budget and the refusal of the UNIP to allow parliamentary debate on the topic, a number of problems concerning military funding were covered up rather than addressed. For example, the facilities at ZNS training camps were so inadequate that typhoid outbreaks became common among recruits. This was due to lack of funds to filter the camps' drinking water. After a particularly serious typhoid outbreak between 1980 and 1981, the government was forced to suspend and later stop the compulsory national service programme.

In November 1982, the ZNDF killed Adamson Mushala in an ambush outside Solwezi, although his followers continued to carry out operations under the leadership of Alexander Saimbwende. The DSC continued to pose a sufficient threat that an Italian mineral survey team had to be evacuated from Northwestern Province in 1984 after being targeted by the guerrillas. Nevertheless, the erosion of South African support ensured that its forces remained small and poorly armed. Mushala and later Saimbwende turned to ivory poaching to sustain their war effort against the ZNDF.

As the Mozambican Civil War intensified, the ZNDF had to contend with a number of armed incursions by Mozambican National Resistance (RENAMO) insurgents, who raided Zambian border towns in search of food and other supplies. The ZNDF made it a policy to pursue RENAMO into neighbouring Mozambique in hot pursuit if necessary.

In 1988, a second coup d'état attempt was planned, this time by Lieutenant General Christian Tembo and at least three other senior army officers. The conspirators were detained before they could carry it out, but this temporarily jeopardised relations between the Zambian government and the army.

The end of the Cold War brought a number of changes to the Zambian political situation and the ZNDF. The ZNDF remained heavily in debt with the former Soviet bloc for military equipment it had purchased in the 1980s, as well as interest accrued. The army in particular was badly affected by the collapse of its Soviet technical training program, which left much of its heavy weapons unserviceable.

Following mass protests over President Kaunda's decision to cut subsidies for maize meal and double maize prices in 1990, Captain Mwamba Luchembe single-handedly seized the national radio station and announced a coup d'état. Luchembe held the radio station for only two hours before being arrested. Kaunda's unpopularity led to demonstrations in support of Luchembe, however, and the same day the president announced he would seek a referendum on democratic multi-party elections. Kaunda granted a blanket amnesty to his political opponents as he prepared to accept the return of multi-party elections, which would shortly thereafter end his term of almost three decades. Among those who received amnesty was Alexander Saimbwende, who surrendered to the government and ended the DSC insurgency.

The 1991 general election brought Frederick Chiluba and his opposition Movement for Multi-Party Democracy to power and ushered in a period of reforms for the ZNDF. The Chiluba government dismantled the ZNDF's unified command structure and allowed the army, ZNS, and air force to revert to independent commands. The system of political patronage introduced to the ZNDF by Kaunda was also abandoned. A general demobilisation programme was instituted in the army, and parliament gained the ability to debate defence expenditure. The Chiluba government immediately formed a Public Accounts Committee to reduce financial irregularities in the ZNDF, most of which were linked to corruption and abuse of the ministerial tender system. Zambia's 1991 constitution formally reinstated the title Zambian Defence Force for the armed forces.

In October 1997, Captain Steven Lungu seized control of the national radio station and announced a coup d'état. Lungu dismissed the chiefs of the army and police and announced that he was forming a new Government of National Redemption. He gave President Chiluba an ultimatum of three hours to surrender or face death. Loyal ZDF troops responded by storming the radio station, capturing Lungu and five other coup plotters.

In early August 2022, the government announced that it would recruit up to 5,000 military personnel by October of the same year.

== Command ==
In 1976 Zambia adopted a unified command system, in which the three Service Chiefs reported to a Commander of the Zambian National Defence Force (ZNDF). The Commander of Zambia Air Force at the time, Air Commodore Peter Zuze, was promoted to Lieutenant-General and appointed as Deputy Commander of the ZNDF. However, the Zambia Air Force and Zambia National Service resented this system because Army officers filled most senior appointments in the ZNDF and the system was ended in 1980. The country then reverted to the command system inherited at independence where Service Chiefs report to the Head of State through a Minister of Defence.

The current (2021) Command is:

- President and Commander-in-Chief: Hakainde Hichilema (from 24 August 2021)

- Defence Minister: Ambrose Lwiji Lufuma (from 27 August 2021)

- Permanent Secretary for Defence: Norman Chipakupaku

- Commander Zambia Army: Lieut.-General Dennis Sitali Alibuzwi (from 29 August 2021)

- Deputy Commander Zambia Army: Major-General Geoffrey Zyeele (from 29 August 2021)

- Commander Zambia Air Force: Lieut.-General Collins Barry (from 29 August 2021)

- Deputy Commander Zambia Air Force: Major General Oscar Nyoni

- Commander Zambia National Service: Lieutenant General Eng Maliti Solochi II

- Deputy Commander Zambia National Service: Major-General Reuben Mwewa

- Commandant Defence Services and Staff Training College: Brigadier General Benson Musonda.

== Zambia Army ==
=== Organisation ===
The current Army organisation is:

Three infantry brigades -

- 1 Brigade, Lusaka
- 2 Brigade, Kabwe (during July 2016 the Brigade Commander was Brigadier Martin Banda)
- 3 Brigade, Ndola (during March 2017 the Brigade Commander was Brigadier Laston Chabinga)

With the following units:

- 64 Armoured Regiment (tank). U.S. State Department International Military Education and Training records from FY-2006 indicate a Zambian officer attended from 64 Armoured Regiment at Mikango Barracks, east Lusaka.
- 17 Cavalry Regiment (armoured reconnaissance)
- 10 Medium Regiment, Kalewa Barracks, Ndola (also given as an artillery regiment/brigade of two Fire Direction Artillery Battalions and one Multiple Rocket Launchers battalion)
- 1 Engineer Regiment, Mufulira
- 6 Construction Regiment, raised March 2017?
- 1 mechanised battalion
- 6 light infantry battalions, titled 1 to 6 Battalions Zambia Regiment
- 1 Commando Battalion (special forces), Ndola
- 48 Marine Unit, Kawambwa, raised July 2015.
- 3 reserve infantry battalions (7 to 9 Battalions Zambia Regiment)
- Support units (logistics, transport, medical, ordnance, electrical and mechanical engineering)
- Specialist schools (armour, artillery, engineers and signals)

=== Equipment ===
==== Small arms ====
- RPG-7
- FN FAL
- Heckler & Koch G3
- AKM
- AK-47
- Sterling submachine gun
- DShK
- PK machine gun

==== Vehicles and towed artillery ====
| | Origin | Type | Versions | In service | Notes |
|---|---|---|---|---|---|
| T-54/55 | Soviet Union | Main Battle Tank | | 25 | Deliveries in 1976 and 1981. |
| PT-76 | Soviet Union | Light tank | | 50 | |
| BTR-80 | Russia | Armoured Personnel Carrier | | 20 | |
| BTR-70 | Soviet Union | Armoured Personnel Carrier | | 20 | |
| BTR-60 | Soviet Union | Armoured Personnel Carrier | | 13 | |
| WZ551 | China | Armoured Personnel Carrier | 6X6 WZ551B variant. | 20 | |
| Buffel | South Africa | Armoured Personnel Carrier | Rhino variant. | 1 | |
| Ratel | South Africa | Infantry Fighting Vehicle | | 14 | |
| GAZ Tigr | Russia | Infantry Mobility Vehicle | | 22 | |
| Ferret | United Kingdom | Armoured car | | 28 | Inherited from Northern Rhodesian security forces. |
| BRDM-2 | Soviet Union | Scout car | | 44 | Acquired in 1981. |
| BRDM-1 | Soviet Union | Scout car | | 44 | Acquired in 1980. |
| D-30 | Soviet Union | Howitzer | | 24 | |
| M-46 | China | Howitzer | Type 59 | 18 | |
| Elbit Spear MK2 | Israel | self-propelled Mortar | Elbit Spear MK2 | 6 | self-propelled variant of the Cardom mortar |
| ATMOS M46 | Israel | self-propelled Howitzer | Elbit Spear MK2 | 6 | mounted on Tatra trucks |
| BM-21 | Soviet Union | MLRS | | 50 | |

== Zambia Air Force ==
The Zambia Air Force is a small air force that developed from the Northern Rhodesian Air Wing as well as the former Federation of Rhodesia and Nyasaland Air Force. In recent years the aircraft inventory has largely been updated with Chinese aircraft reflecting the increasing closeness between the Zambian Defence Force and China. During 1999 eight Karakorum-8 jet trainers were delivered and in 2006 the Zambia Air Force received two Xian MA60 and five Yakovlev Yak-12 transport aircraft from China. During March 2012 a further eight K-8 were received. Four Harbin Z-9 helicopters were delivered in June 2012, with a further four delivered by March 2013 (when one of the new aircraft was lost in an accident, see below).

In April 2014 six Hongdu L-15 Falcon supersonic lead-in fighter/trainer jets were ordered from China, the first arriving in December 2015. Around the same time orders were placed for six SIAI-Marchetti SF.260TW trainer aircraft, one Alenia C-27J Spartan transport aircraft, and a number of Russian-made Mil Mi-17 helicopters. These orders were expected to be delivered during 2016.

=== Recent aircraft losses ===
- On 13 March 2013 a Harbin Z-9 helicopter crashed while attempting to land at Lusaka City Airport. The pilot, Major Misapa Mukupa, was killed, and the co-pilot, Lieutenant Kenneth Chilala, was injured. The helicopter was taking part in Youth Day celebrations and it was suggested the accident was caused by a national flag attached to the aircraft coming loose and then entangled in the tail rotor.
- On 15 January 2014 a Saab MFI.17 Supporter trainer crashed some 40 km from Livingstone. Both crew were killed.
- On 19 May 2014 a Saab MFI.15 crashed in Lusaka West. Both crew were killed. The crew were the Deputy Commander ZAF, Major-General Muliokela Muliokela, and Colonel Brian Mweene.
- On 14 September 2015 an Agusta-Bell AB.205 helicopter crashed near Sinazongwe, apparently while returning from taking Defence Minister Richwell Siamunene on a private trip. Five people were injured.
- On 28 March 2022 two Zambian Air Force pilots, Colonel Lyson Siame, and Second Lieutenant Kalasa Bwalya, were killed when their SF-260TW aircraft (registration AF-545) crashed 38 kilometres north of Harry Mwaanga Nkumbula International Airport near Livingstone.

== Zambia National Service ==
The Zambia National Service is an integral component of the Defence Force of Zambia, and is established by Article 192 (1)(c) of the Constitution of Zambia (Amendment) Act, No.2 of 2016 and is governed by the Zambia National Service Act, Chapter 121 of the Laws of Zambia. Section 3(4) of the Zambia National Service Act states that the supreme command of the Service shall vest in the President, and he shall hold the office of Commander-in-Chief of the Service. This is a restatement of the executive authority, which includes the power to Commission Officers into the Defence Force of Zambia through the Zambia National Service

the Zambia National Service is a component of the Defence Force of Zambia. The functions of the Service as outlined in Article 192(2) of the Constitution of Zambia,2016, as read together with section 3(2) of the Zambia National Service Act. The functions are

(a) preserve and defend the sovereignty and territorial integrity of the Republic;

(b) foster harmony and understanding between the Zambia Army, Zambia Air Force, Zambia National Service and members of society; and

(c) Cooperate with State organs and State institutions in times of public emergencies and national disasters

(d) The training of citizens to serve the Republic

(e) The employment of its members in tasks of national importance

(f) The employment of its members in the service and defence of the Republic.

Zambia National Service is a defence wing that is mandated to train citizens to serve the republic, develop infrastructure and enhance national food security and contribute to the social economic development. Zambia National Service (ZNS) personnel have been included in peacekeeping contingents deployed by Zambia to the United Nations' MINUSCA mission in the Central African Republic. The Service is also deployed in important national defence operations to protect Zambias territorial integrity and national resources. It is a key driver of national development and is engaged in numerous project. Six months of training for 400 youths was planned for 2016. This was to include 200 males to be trained at Chiwoko ZNS Training Centre, Katete, Eastern Province, and 200 females to be trained at the Kitwe ZNS training camp.

== United Nations Peacekeeping Missions ==
Zambia has been an active participant in several UN peacekeeping operations, mostly in sub-Saharan Africa. Zambian personnel have been fated to be caught up in some of the more dramatic incidents of recent UN Peacekeeping in Africa: witnessing the Kibeho Massacre in Rwanda during April 1995; having large numbers of Zambian peacekeepers taken hostage by rebels in Sierra Leone during 2000; and with troops caught up in fighting between Sudanese and South Sudanese forces in the contested Abyei area during May 2011. Despite these crises Zambian forces have generally performed well and earned a reputation as effective peacekeepers.

UN missions which have seen the deployment of battalions of Zambian troops, or other significant contingents, include the following.

UNAVEM III (United Nations Angola Verification Mission III, February 1995 to June 1997)

A Zambian battalion was deployed to southern Angola, based in the town of Menongue. Seven Zambian peacekeepers died during the UNAVEM III deployment.

UNAMIR (United Nations Assistance Mission for Rwanda)

Three Zambian fatalities.

UNAMSIL (United Nations Mission in Sierra Leone)

- Zambatt 1, deployed April 2000. Shortly after deployment some 200 Zambian peacekeepers were taken hostage by rebels and some were later murdered.
- Zambatt 2.
- Zambatt 3 (Lt. Col. MS Sitwala). On 5 January 2002 six personnel were killed and another 12 injured in an accidental explosion while transferring surrendered mortar bombs to storage.
- Zambatt 4, deployed mid-2002, 830 strong.
- Zambatt 5.
- Zambatt 6.
- Zambatt 7 (Col. John Siame) – 821 personnel; deployed February 2004 to ... (Note: Sgt [Ms] Megani Forry died of natural causes during deployment, early 2004).

Thirty-four Zambian fatalities., including: - Corporal Freddie Ngambela, 23 January 2004 - Sergeant Ruth Mwangala, 17 April 2004

UNMIS (United Nations Mission in the Sudan)

Three Zambian fatalities. Four Zambian peacekeepers were wounded on 10 May 2011, shortly before the independence of South Sudan and before an outbreak of fighting when the Zambians were criticised for not better protecting civilians.

- Zambatt 1 - Deployed for six months, to June 2010.
- Zambatt 2 - 523 personnel strong; deployed June 2010.

MINUSCA (United Nations Multidimensional Integrated Stabilization Mission in the Central African Republic)

- Zambatt 1 (Lt. Col. Kelvin Chiyangi), 750 personnel, including 50 Special Forces, deployed 30 April 2015 to April 2016.
- Zambatt 2, deployed 22 April 2016.
- Zambatt 3 (Lt. Col. John Banda), 750 personnel. Undertook pre-deployment training under Zambian, United States and British instructors, before deploying in April 2017.
- Zambatt 4 (Lt. Col. Ngosa), deployed during April 2018.
- Zambatt 5 (Lt. Col. Tembo) was to deploy in mid-2019.
- Zambatt 6 (Lt. Col. Paul Sapezo) was scheduled to deploy to the Central African Republic in 2020.
- Zambatt 7 (Lt. Col Jeff Mwanahing'ombe), 172 strong: deployed in 2021 and returned home during September 2022.
- Zambatt 8 (Lt. Col. William Chibanda), 172 strong" Deployed to the CAR during September 2022. Returned August 2023.
- Zambatt 9 (Col. Moses Shapwaya), 178 personnel strong: 4 August 2023 to September 2024.
- Zambatt 10: Return after deployment commenced on 9 August 2025.
- Zambatt 11 (Col. Brian Mbao Ntanga).

During 2017 Warrant Officer 2 Boyd Chibuye died whilst deployed in the Central African Republic.

On 4 December 2017 a Zambian police member of the UN mission was reported injured in an attack by anti-Balaka fighters in Bria, northern CAR. One Mauritanian policeman was killed and two others injured in this attack.

Staff Sergeant Derrick Sichilyango of the Zambian Contingent was killed in a road traffic accident in November 2018.

Staff Sergeant Patrick Simasiku Wamunyima and Staff Sergeant Alex Mudenda Musanda, both serving with MINUSCA, died during 2019 and were honoured on the 2020 International Day of United Nations Peacekeepers with the posthumous award of the Dag Hammarskjöld Medal.

WOI Godfrey Philimon Mwape died on 2 July 2020 whilst deployed on MINUSCA.

WOII Matthews Kaumba died 29 April 2024 whilst deployed with the Zambian Contingent on MINUSCA.

Stephen Muloke Sakachoma was killed, and another service member wounded, on 20 June 2025 in an ambush by unidentified armed elements in Am-Sissia, Vakanga prefecture, Central African Republic, while conducting a patrol to protect civilians.

== SADC Missions ==
SAPMIL (SADC Preventive Mission in the Kingdom of Lesotho)

During November 2017 a small Southern Africa Development Community (SADC) standby force was deployed to Lesotho to assist that country through an internal security crisis following the assassination of the Lesotho Defence Force Commander, Lieut.-General Khoantle Motšomotšo, on 5 September 2017. This SADC force included a 207-strong military element which had a Zambian Deputy Commander and which included 36 infantry and nine logistics personnel from Zambia. The mission wrapped up in November 2018 after successfully stabilising the Kingdom.

== See also ==
- Zambia
- Zambia Air Force
- Zambia Army
- Zambia National Service
- Bibliography of the history of Zambia
