= Lieutenant general =

Military rank

Lieutenant general (Lt Gen, LTG and similar) is a military rank used in many countries. The rank traces its origins to the Middle Ages, where the title of lieutenant general was held by the second-in-command on the battlefield, who was normally subordinate to a captain general.

In modern armies, lieutenant general normally ranks immediately below general (or colonel general) and above major general; it is equivalent to the navy rank of vice admiral, and in air forces with a separate rank structure, it is equivalent to air marshal. In the United States, a lieutenant general has a three star insignia and commands an army corps, typically made up of three army divisions, and consisting of around 60,000 to 70,000 soldiers.

The seeming incongruity that a lieutenant general outranks a major general (whereas a major outranks a lieutenant) is due to the derivation of major general from sergeant major general, which was a rank subordinate to lieutenant general (as a lieutenant outranks a sergeant major). Several countries (e.g. Balkan states) use the rank of lieutenant colonel general instead of lieutenant general, in an attempt to solve this apparent anomaly.

In contrast, in Russia and a number of other countries of the former Soviet Union, lieutenant general is a rank immediately below colonel general, and above major general – in these systems there is no use of the brigadier general of many Western countries.

In addition, some countries use the lieutenant general as the rank of divisional commander, and some have designated them with French revolutionary system. For example, some countries of South America use divisional general as the equivalent of lieutenant general.

== Lieutenant general ranks by country ==
- Lieutenant general (Australia)
- Lieutenant general (Bangladesh)
- Lieutenant-general (Canada)
- Kenraaliluutnantti (Finland)
- Kindralleitnant (Estonia)
- Generalleutnant (Germany)
- Lieutenant general (India)
- Lieutenant general (Nigeria)
- Lieutenant general (Pakistan)
- Lieutenant general (Sri Lanka)
- Generallöjtnant (Sweden)
- Lieutenant general (United Kingdom)
- Lieutenant general (United States)

=== Army ranks ===
Gjeneral lejtant
(Albanian Army)

Tenente-general
(Angolan Army)

Teniente general
(Argentine Army)

գեներալ-լեյտենանտ
General-leytenant
(Armenian Ground Forces)

Lieutenant general
(Australian Army)

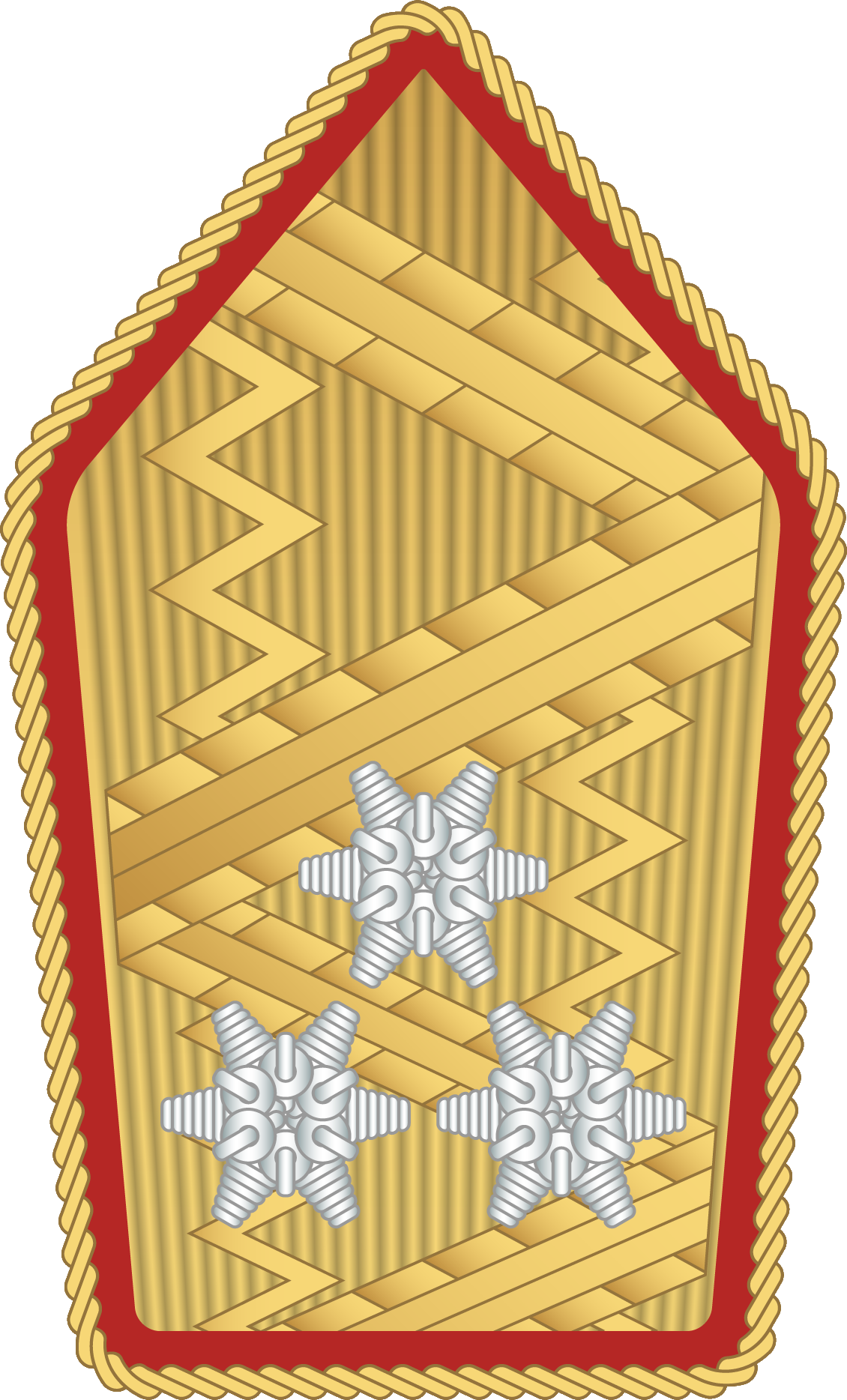
Generalleutnant
(Austrian Army)

General-leytenant
(Azerbaijani Land Forces)

Lieutenant general
লেফটেন্যান্ট জেনারেল
(Bangladesh Army)

Ґенэрал-лейтэнант
G̀jeneral-liejtenant
(Belarusian Ground Forces)

Luitenant-generaal
(Belgian Land Component)

གུང་ བློན་ གོང མ །
Lieutenant general
(Royal Bhutan Army)

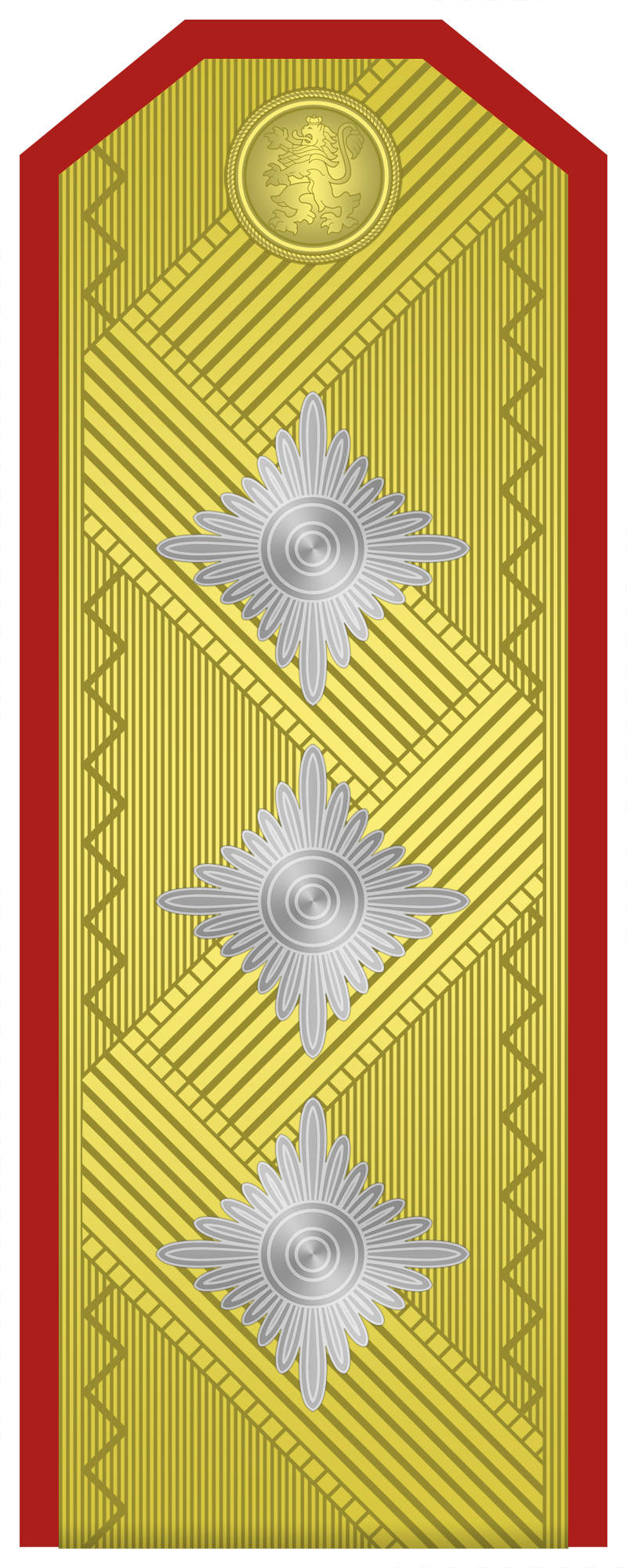
Генерал-лейтенант
General-leytenant
(Bulgarian Land Forces)

Lieutenant general
(Botswana Ground Force)

Leftenan jeneral
(Royal Brunei Land Force)

Lieutenant-général
Riyetena jenerai
(Burundi Army)

Lieutenant-general
Lieutenant-général
(Canadian Army)

Lieutenant-général
(Land Forces of the DR Congo)

Generálporučík
(Czech Land Forces)

Generalløjtnant
(Royal Danish Army)

Teniente general
(Dominican Army)

Kindralleitnant
(Estonian Land Forces)

Kenraaliluutnantti
Generallöjtnant
(Finnish Army)

Lieutenant general
(Gambian National Army)

გენერალ ლეიტენანტი
General leit’enant’i
(Georgian Land Forces)

Generalleutnant
(German Army)

Lieutenant general
(Ghana Army)

Tenente-general
(Army of Guinea-Bissau)

Lieutenant-général
(Haitian Army)

Lieutenant general
लेफ्टिनेंट - जनरल
(Indian Army)

Letnan jenderal
(Indonesian Army)

Lieutenant-general
Leifteanant-ghinearál
(Irish Army)

Tenente Generale
(Italian Army)

Lieutenant general
(Jamaican Army)

Генерал-лейтенант
General-leytenant
(Kazakh Ground Forces)

Lieutenant general
(Kenya Army)

Gjeneral lejtnant
(Kosovo Security Force)

Ģenerālleitnants
(Latvian Land Forces)

Lieutenant general
(Lesotho Army)

Lieutenant general
(Liberian Ground Forces)

Generolas leitenantas
(Lithuanian Land Forces)

Lieutenant general
(Malawi Army)

Leftenan jeneral
(Malaysian Army)

Дэслэгч генерал
Deslegch gyenyeral
(Mongolian Ground Forces)

Tenente general
(Mozambican Army)

Lieutenant general
(Namibian Army)

Luitenant-generaal
(Royal Netherlands Army)

Lieutenant general
रथी
(Nepali Army)

Lieutenant-general
(New Zealand Army)

Lieutenant general
(Nigerian Army)

Generalløytnant
(Norwegian Army)

Lieutenant general
لیفٹیننٹ جنرل
(Pakistan Army)

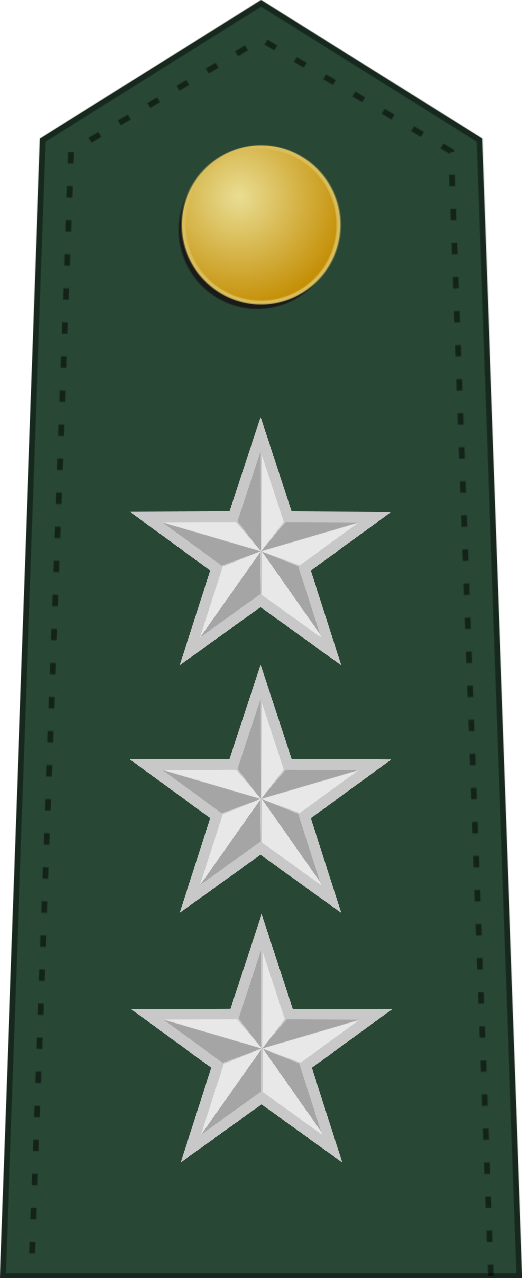
Lieutenant general
(Philippine Army)

Tenente-general
(Portuguese Army)

General-locotenent
(Romanian Land Forces)

Генера́л-лейтена́нт
Generál-leytenánt
(Russian Ground Forces)

Lieutenant general
(Rwandan Land Forces)

Lieutenant general
(Sierra Leone Army)

Lieutenant general
(Singapore Army)

Generálporučík
(Slovak Ground Forces)

Teniente general
(Spanish Army)

Lieutenant general
(Sri Lanka Army)

Lieutenant general
(South African Army)

Lieutenant general
(South Sudan Army)

Lieutenant general
(Eswatini Army)

Generallöjtnant
(Swedish Army)

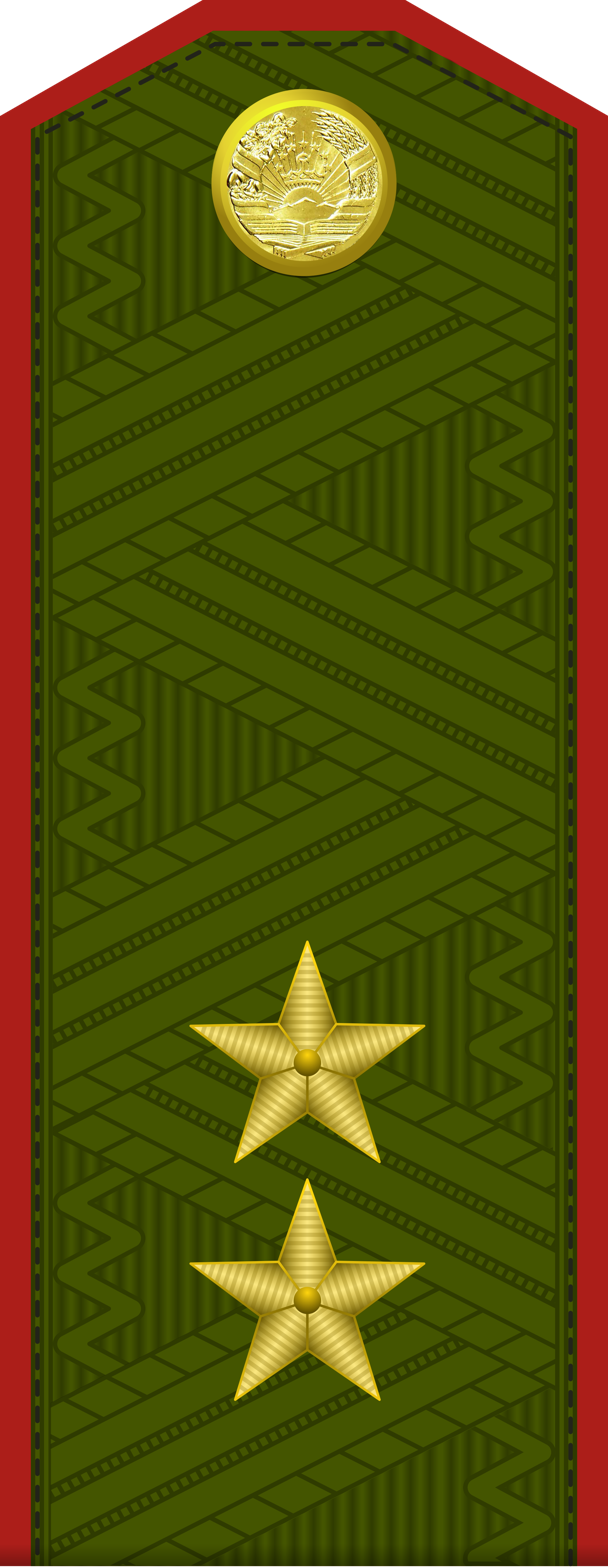
Генерал-лейтенант
General-lejtenant
(Tajik National Army)

Lieutenant general
Luteni jenerali
(Tanzanian Army)

Tenente-general
(Timor-Leste Army)

General-leýtenant
(Turkmen Ground Forces)

Lieutenant general
(Ugandan Army)

Генерал-лейтенант
Heneral-leytenant
(Ukrainian Ground Forces)

Lieutenant-general
(British Army)

Lieutenant general
(United States Army)

Teniente general
(National Army of Uruguay)

General-leytenant
(Uzbek Ground Forces)

Lieutenant general
(Zambian Army)

Lieutenant general
(Zimbabwe National Army)

=== Air force ranks ===
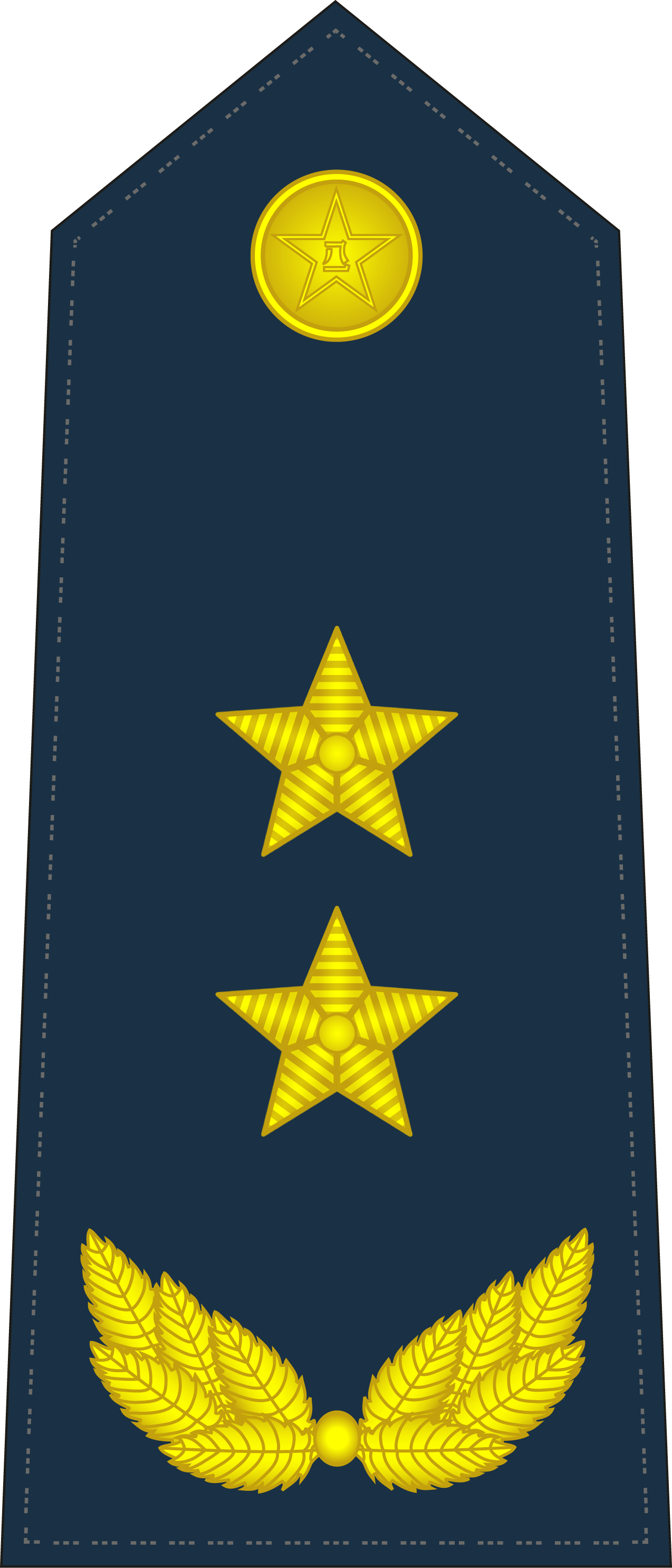
Kōngjūn zhong jiang (People's Liberation Army Air Force)

Tiong-chiòng (Republic of China Air Force)

General-leytenant (Russian Aerospace Forces)

Lieutenant general
(United States Air Force)

Heneral-leytenant (Ukrainian Air Force)

=== Naval infantry ===
Letnan jenderal (Marinir)
(Indonesian Marine Corps)

ލެފްޓިނަންޓް ޖެނެރަލް
Lieutenant general
(Maldivian Marine Corps)

Lieutenant-generaal
(Netherlands Marine Corps)

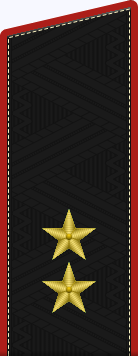
General-leytenant (Russian Naval Infantry)

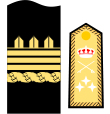
Teniente general
(Spanish Marine Infantry)

Generallöjtnant
(Swedish Amphibious Corps)

Lieutenant-general
(Royal Marines)

Lieutenant general
(United States Marine Corps)

== See also ==
- Comparative military ranks
- Lieutenant-general insignia
- List of lieutenant generals in the United States Army before 1960
