= Zambian Army =

Land warfare branch of the Zambian Defence Force

- Founded: 1963; 63 years ago
- Country: Zambia
- Type: Army
- Role: Ground warfare
- Size: 17,100 Active duty personnel
- Part of: Zambian Defence Force
- Headquarters: Lusaka
- Mottos: Defend and Serve with Pride
- Colours: Scarlet and Dartmouth Green
- Mascot: Buffalo
- Anniversaries: Army Day: 28 December
- Engagements: Rhodesian Bush War; South African Border War; Mozambican Civil War

Commanders
- Commander-in-chief: Hakainde Hichilema
- Minister of Defence: Ambrose Lufuma
- Commander: Lt Gen Geoffrey Zyeele
- Deputy Army Commander: Maj Gen Luswepo Sinyinza

The Zambian Army is the land military branch of the Zambian Defence Force. Like all branches of the Zambian military, citizens of the nation are required to register at 16 years old, and citizens can join at 16 years old with parental consent or at 18 years old when they are classified as adults by Zambia. There is currently no conscription. (There was a Zambia National Defence Force conscription from 1975 to 1980.) Applicants must be Zambian citizens and must have a school Grade 12 certification. Applicants must also undergo a test for HIV on enlistment. Personnel can serve until age 55, when there is a mandatory retirement. Its first Commander Major General was Michael Grigg, appointed by Kenneth Kaunda. The first local Commander was Gen Kingsley Chinkuli. According to the 2014 CIA World Factbook: The current National Army Commander is Lieutenant General Geoffrey Choongo Zyeele and his deputy is Major General Luswepo Sinyinzawho who were both appointed by President Hakainder Hichilema on 12 September 2024.

- There are 3,041,069 men between 16-49 who are classified as manpower (this does not mean that all of them are fit for duty), and 2,948,291 women between 16–49 who are classified as manpower. This makes a total of 5,989,360 people classified as manpower.
- There are 1,745,656 men who are classified as fit for military service between the ages of 16–49. There are 1,688,670 women who are classified as fit for military service between the ages of 16–49. Therefore, Zambia has 3,434,326 people fit for military service between the ages of 16–49.
- 1.55% of the GDP of Zambia is spent on the military, ranked 70th in the world.

== Organisation ==
The current Army organisation is as follows:

Three infantry brigades:

- 1 Brigade (Lusaka)
- 2 Brigade (Kabwe)
- 3 Brigade (Ndola)

With the following units:

- 64th Armoured Tank Regiment (tank).
- 17th Cavalry Regiment (armoured reconnaissance)
- 10th Medium Artillery Regiment
  - 2 Artillery Battalions
  - Multiple Rocket Launchers Battalion
- 1 Engineer Regiment, Mufulira
- 6 Construction Regiment
- Mechanised battalion
- Zambia Regiment (raised in 1964 from the Northern Rhodesia Regiment)
  - Light Infantry
    - 1st Battalion
    - 2nd Battalion
    - 3rd Battalion
    - 4th Battalion
    - 5th Battalion
    - 6th Battalion
  - Reserve Infantry
    - 7th Battalion
    - 8th Battalion
    - 9th Battalion
- 1 Commando Battalion
- 48th Marine Unit
- Specialist schools
- 83 Parachute Regiment

== Ranks ==
=== Commissioned officer ranks ===
The rank insignia of commissioned officers.

Rank group	General / flag officers				Senior officers			Junior officers
Zambian Army
Zambian Army	General	Lieutenant general	Major general	Brigadier	Colonel	Lieutenant colonel	Major	Captain	Lieutenant	Second lieutenant

=== Other ranks ===
The rank insignia of non-commissioned officers and enlisted personnel.

Rank group	Senior NCOs				Junior NCOs		Enlisted
Zambian Army							No insignia
Zambian Army	Warrant officer class 1	Warrant officer class 2	Staff sergeant	Sergeant	Corporal	Lance corporal	Private (or equivalent)

== Equipment ==
=== Small arms ===
Name	Image	Caliber	Type	Origin	Notes
Pistols
TT-33		7.62×25mm	Semi-automatic pistol	Soviet Union	
Stechkin APS		9×18mm	Semi-automatic pistol	Soviet Union	
Sub-machine guns
Sterling		9×19mm	Submachine gun	United Kingdom	
Heckler & Koch MP5		9×19mm	Submachine gun	Germany	
Rifles
FN FAL		7.62×51mm	Battle rifle	Belgium	
Heckler & Koch G3		7.62×51mm	Battle rifle	Germany	
Zastava M59/66		7.62×39mm	Semi-automatic rifle	Yugoslavia	
AKM		7.62×39mm	Assault rifle	Soviet Union	
AK-74		5.45×39mm	Assault rifle	Soviet Union	
IWI Galil ACE		5.56×45mm	Assault rifle Carbine	Israel	
IWI Tavor		5.56×45mm	Bullpup; Assault rifle	Israel	
Machine guns
DShK		12.7×108mm	Heavy machine gun	Soviet Union	
SG-43		7.62×54mmR	Medium machine gun	Soviet Union	
RP-46		7.62×54mmR	Light machine gun	Soviet Union	
RPK		7.62×39mm	Squad automatic weapon	Soviet Union	
PKM		7.62×54mmR	General-purpose machine gun	Soviet Union	
Grenade launchers
RPG-7		40mm	Rocket-propelled grenade	Soviet Union	

=== Tanks ===
Name	Image	Type	Origin	Quantity	Status	Notes
T-55		Medium tank	Soviet Union	25	INS	Deliveries in 1976 and 1981.
PT-76		Amphibious Light tank	Soviet Union	30	INS	
Type 59		Main battle tank	China	20	INS	

=== Armored vehicles ===
Name	Image	Type	Origin	Quantity	Status	Notes
BTR-60		Armoured personnel carrier	Soviet Union	13	INS	
BTR-70		Armoured personnel carrier	Soviet Union	20	INS	
BTR-80		Armoured personnel carrier	Soviet Union	20	INS	
BRDM-1		Amphibious armored scout car	Soviet Union	44	INS	Acquired in 1980.
BRDM-2		Amphibious armored scout car	Soviet Union	44	INS	Acquired in 1981.
GAZ Tigr		Infantry Mobility Vehicle	Russia	35	INS	GAZ-233014
WZ551		Armoured personnel carrier	China	20	INS	6X6 WZ551B variant.
Ratel		Infantry fighting vehicle	South Africa	14	INS	
Buffel		Infantry mobility vehicle	South Africa	1	INS	Rhino variant.
Saymar Musketeer		Armored car	Israel		INS	

=== Anti-tank weapons ===
Name	Image	Type	Origin	Caliber	Notes
Carl Gustav		Recoilless rifle	Sweden	84mm	
M18		Recoilless rifle	United States	57mm	
M20		Recoilless rifle	United States	75mm	
9M14 Malyutka		Anti-tank missile	Soviet Union	75mm	

=== Artillery ===
Name	Image	Type	Origin	Quantity	Status	Notes
Self-propelled artillery
ATMOS 2000		Self-propelled	Israel	6	INS	Mounted on a Czech 6×6 Tatra 10-tonne chassis.
Elbit Spear MK2 Cardom		Self-propelled mortar	Israel	6	INS	Mounted on an Indian Tata Trucks LPTA 713TC 4×4 chassis.
Rocket artillery
BM-21 Grad		Multiple rocket launcher	Soviet Union	50	INS	
Field artillery
Type 59		Towed field gun	Soviet Union; China	18	INS	
D-30		Howitzer	Soviet Union	24	INS	
Mod.56		Howitzer	Italy	18	INS	

=== Air defence systems ===
Name	Image	Type	Origin	Quantity	Status	Notes
KS-12		Anti-aircraft gun	Soviet Union	16	INS	
61-K		Autocannon	Soviet Union	40	INS	
AZP S-60		Autocannon	Soviet Union	30	INS	
Zastava M55		Autocannon	Yugoslavia	50	INS	

=== Unmanned aerial vehicles ===
Name	Image	Type	Origin	In service	Notes
Elbit Skylark		Miniature UAV	Israel	2	
