= List of mines in Zambia =

Zambia has a large mining industry, especially in the Copperbelt region.

== Mopani copper and cobalt mines ==
Year opened	Current owner(s)	Facility type	Construction / acquisition cost	Product(s)	Facility	Capacity	Location(s)	Status
1932	Delta Mining Limited, a subsidiary of International Resource Holdings (IRH) 51% ZCCM Investment Holdings (ZCCM-IH) 49%	Ore mine to smelter	ZMW 25.5bn (US$1.1 bn)* US$1.5 bn**	Copper metal Cobalt metal	Nkana Mine	5,500,000 tons of copper ore.	Kitwe, Copperbelt (HQ); Mufulira, Copperbelt	Active
1932	Delta Mining Limited, a subsidiary of International Resource Holdings (IRH) 51% ZCCM Investment Holdings (ZCCM-IH) 49%	Ore mine to smelter	ZMW 25.5bn (US$1.1 bn)* US$1.5 bn**	Copper metal Cobalt metal	Mufulira Mine	2,500,000 tons of copper ore	Kitwe, Copperbelt (HQ); Mufulira, Copperbelt	Active
1932	Delta Mining Limited, a subsidiary of International Resource Holdings (IRH) 51% ZCCM Investment Holdings (ZCCM-IH) 49%	Ore mine to smelter	ZMW 25.5bn (US$1.1 bn)* US$1.5 bn**	Copper metal Cobalt metal	Mufulira (ISASMELT) smelter	200,000 tons of copper anode	Kitwe, Copperbelt (HQ); Mufulira, Copperbelt	Active
1932	Delta Mining Limited, a subsidiary of International Resource Holdings (IRH) 51% ZCCM Investment Holdings (ZCCM-IH) 49%	Ore mine to smelter	ZMW 25.5bn (US$1.1 bn)* US$1.5 bn**	Copper metal Cobalt metal	Mufulira refinery	275,000 tons of copper cathode	Kitwe, Copperbelt (HQ); Mufulira, Copperbelt	Active
1932	Delta Mining Limited, a subsidiary of International Resource Holdings (IRH) 51% ZCCM Investment Holdings (ZCCM-IH) 49%	Ore mine to smelter	ZMW 25.5bn (US$1.1 bn)* US$1.5 bn**	Copper metal Cobalt metal	Nkana solvent extraction plant	15,000 tons of copper cathode	Kitwe, Copperbelt (HQ); Mufulira, Copperbelt	Active
1932	Delta Mining Limited, a subsidiary of International Resource Holdings (IRH) 51% ZCCM Investment Holdings (ZCCM-IH) 49%	Ore mine to smelter	ZMW 25.5bn (US$1.1 bn)* US$1.5 bn**	Copper metal Cobalt metal	Nkana cobalt plant	7,000 tons of cobalt metal	Kitwe, Copperbelt (HQ); Mufulira, Copperbelt	Active

*In February 2024, Zambia Consolidated Copper Mines-Investment Holdings (ZCCM-IH) approved the acquisition of a 51 percent stake worth 25.5 bn kwacha (US$1.1 bn)in Mopani Copper Mines Plc by Delta Mining Limited a subsidiary of International Resource Holdings (IRH) that is headquartered in Abu Dhabi, United Arab Emirates.

**In January 2021. the Zambian government, through the ZZCM-IH, took on US$1.5 billion in debt to and acquired the 90% shares of Mopani Copper Mines Plc from Carlisa Investments Corporation and became the sole owner of Mopani Copper Mines Plc.

Prior to January 2021, Mopani Copper Mines Plc (Mopani) was a joint venture company based in Kitwe as 95% of its operations are located there, comprising Glencore International AG (73.1%), First Quantum Minerals Ltd. (16.9%) and Zambian Consolidated Copper Mines Limited (10%). Mopani operates the Mufulira mine, smelter, concentrator and copper refinery and the Nkana mine, concentrator and cobalt plant. MCM produced 134,800 tons of copper and 2040 tons of cobalt in 2003. MCM is investing in a number of oxide copper projects at several of its properties, including an in-situ leaching project at Mufulira and heap leaching at Nkana, and has achieved significant production increases at its underground mining operations in Kitwe and Mufulira. Copper production from internal sources was supplemented by the purchase of some 18,000 tons of copper in high-grade oxide concentrate bought from the Democratic Republic of the Congo. The company aims to rebuild the Mufulira smelter during 2004 and 2005, and also plans to add a new gas collection facility and acid plant at a total cost of US$95 million.

In July 2022 ZCCM-Investment Holdings agreed to offer corporate guarantees of up to US$15.0 million to Atlas Mara Bank Zambia Limited to provide working capital to Mopani Copper Mines (MCM) to inject liquidity for its operations.

In October 2022 Sibanye-Stillwater expressed an interest to acquire Zambia's Mopani Copper Mines, the mine and smelter complex looking for new investors after Glencore sold the asset to the state in January 2021. Zambia's state mining firm ZCCM-IH hired Rothschild in June 2022 to help find a new investor to upgrade and expand it.

=== Mufulira mine ===
The largest underground mine in Africa, the Mufulira Mine employs 10,000 people; includes a concentrator, a refinery and a smelter; and produces 300,000 tons of copper each year through the process of open stoping. The copper is then taken to the concentrator.

=== Mufulira concentrator ===
The concentrator crushes ores coming from the Mufulira mine consisting of 46% copper, waters it, and then does the process of flotation so the waste material can be removed.

=== Mufulira smelter ===
Built in 1927, the smelter melts the copper mixed with limestone in the Isasmelt furnace. The copper is pressurised by the air, then oxidised, and finally poled. The copper is then taken to the refinery. Mopani completed the third and final phase of upgrading its Mufulira Smelter in the first quarter of 2014.

=== Mufulira refinery ===
The copper is cast into anodes so the process of electrolysis can take place during refining.

=== Nkana mine ===
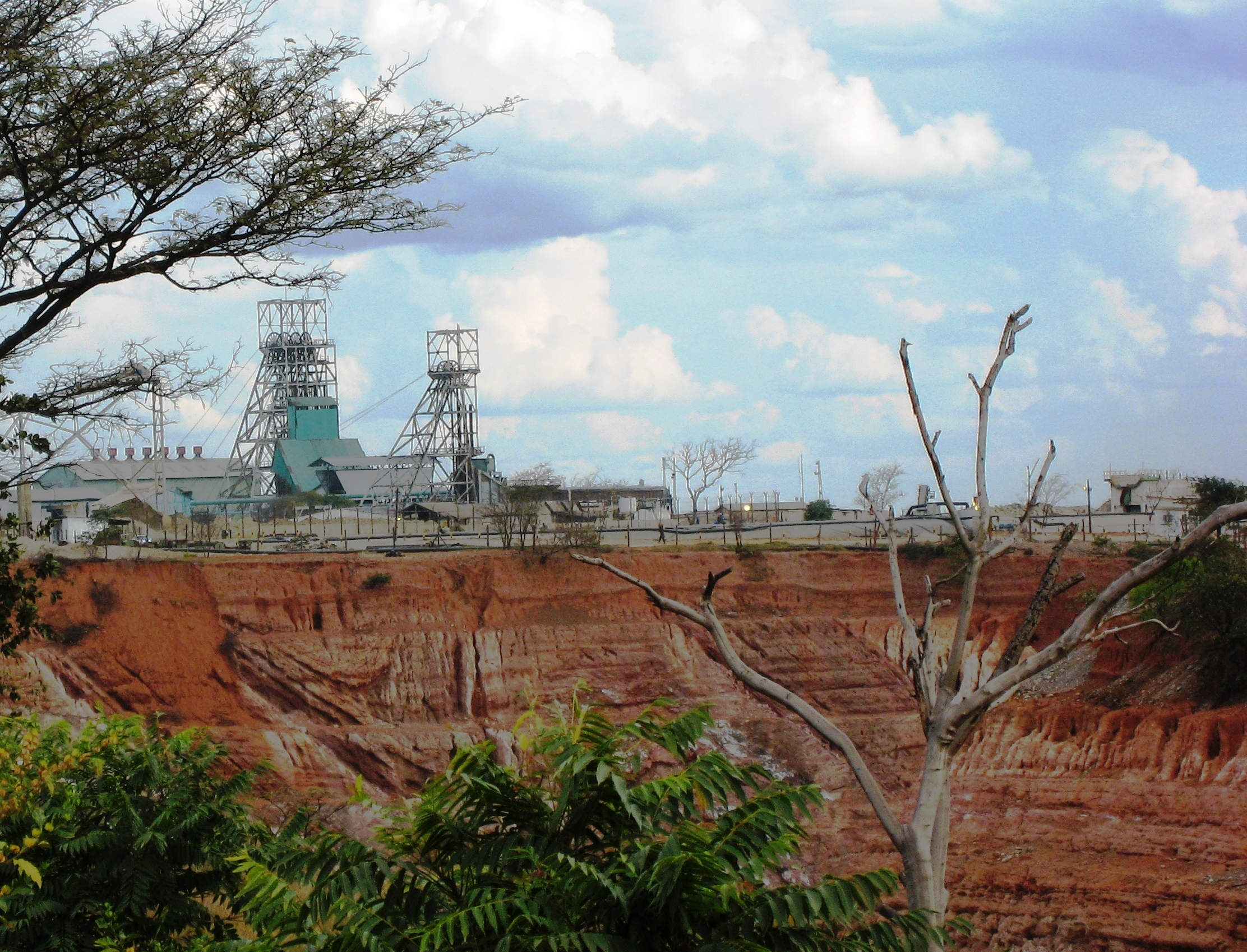
Nkana open pit and headgear in Kitwe

Nkana mine is one of the largest in Africa, a copper mine located 1 km south-west of Kitwe. The mine is underground as well as open pit and is in operation since 1932 and has produced 6,000,000 tons of copper so far. Its reserves underground include 69,000,000 tons of grading, 16,000,000 tons of copper, and 98,000 tons of cobalt. Its resources include 126,000,000 tons of grading, 43,000,000 tons of copper, and 300,000 tons of cobalt. Copper and cobalt mineralisation occur within the ore shale. Copper mineralisation in the deposits changes from mostly chalcopyrite in the South Orebody, to chalcopyrite-bornite in the Central area and to bornite-chalcopyrite at Mindola. Cobalt occurs as carrollite and cobaltiferous pyrite in approximately equal proportions. The mine produces copper and cobalt from three sources: Mindola Shaft, Central Shaft and South Orebody Shaft. Vertical crater retreat is the predominant mining method while sublevel open-stopping and sublevel caving methods are also used. Other metallurgical facilities, under a management contract by an affiliate of the Anglo American Group, include the Nkana smelter (not owned by Mopani), acid plant (not owned by Mopani) and copper refinery (not owned by Mopani). There is extensive mine tailings around this mine.

=== Nkana concentrator ===
Nkana concentrator of Mopani mines, located in Kitwe, treats copper-cobalt sulphide ore using a bulk flotation and segregation flotation flowsheet to produce separate copper and cobalt concentrates. Nkana Concentrator is the most important mineral processing unit of Mopani, as it contributes about 65% of cobalt concentrates treated at the Nkana and Chambeshi Cobalt plants to produce high purity cobalt metal.

=== Nkana and chambeshi cobalt plants ===
The cobalt plant treats 65% of the cobalt concentrates to produce high purity cobalt metal. The two cobalt plants are Nkana cobalt plant and Chambeshi cobalt plant. Glencore has also used acid leaching, a method used to extract ore, in order to effectively extract and produce copper and cobalt.

In May 2022 Mopani Copper Mines announced its intention to restart processing cobalt on account of the rising prices of the metal which it halted more than a decade ago after international prices collapsed.

=== Mufulira copper and cobalt processing plant ===
In May 2022, Blue Star Resources Ltd, a subsidiary of Blue Star Capital, of the United Arab Emirates in a joint venture with Mopani Copper Mines (MCM) announced plans to invest US$300.0 million into a new Copper and Cobalt processing facility to be located in Mufulira District. The intention is to develop the two historical copper slag dumpsites in the district.

The project is expected to create 300 new permanent jobs and incorporates plans to invest US$2.5 million into each of the three constituencies in the district as part of the JV's Corporate Social Responsibility Program CSRP.

== Konkola copper and cobalt mines ==
Konkola Copper Mines (KCM) is the largest copper mining company in the country. Although based in Chingola, 15% of its operations—namely Nkana Refinery, Nkana Acid Plants and Nkana Smelter (the largest smelter in the nation) -- are located in Kitwe. The Nkana Smelter is the largest primary copper production plant in Zambia. The plant treats concentrates mainly from Nkana, Nchanga, and Konkola mines, which are wholly owned by KCM to produce up to 150,000 tons of new copper.

Year opened	Current owner(s)	Facility type	Construction / acquisition cost	Product(s)	Facility	Capacity	Location(s)	Status
1957	Vedanta Resources Plc	Ore Mine to smelter	US$25 million*	Copper anodes LME A grade copper cathodes	Chingola open pit A and Nchanga open pit	4,500,000 tons of copper ore	Konkola Mine, Chililabombwe, copperbelt Nchanga Copper mine, Chingola, copperbelt Nkana Refinery, Kitwe, copperbelt	Active
1957	Vedanta Resources Plc	Ore Mine to smelter	US$25 million*	Copper anodes LME A grade copper cathodes	Nchanga underground mine	2,800,000 tons of copper ore	Konkola Mine, Chililabombwe, copperbelt Nchanga Copper mine, Chingola, copperbelt Nkana Refinery, Kitwe, copperbelt	Active
1957	Vedanta Resources Plc	Ore Mine to smelter	US$25 million*	Copper anodes LME A grade copper cathodes	Konkola Mine (KDMP)	2,400,000 tons of copper ore	Konkola Mine, Chililabombwe, copperbelt Nchanga Copper mine, Chingola, copperbelt Nkana Refinery, Kitwe, copperbelt	Active
1957	Vedanta Resources Plc	Ore Mine to smelter	US$25 million*	Copper anodes LME A grade copper cathodes	Nchanga tailings leach plant	80,000 tons of copper cathode	Konkola Mine, Chililabombwe, copperbelt Nchanga Copper mine, Chingola, copperbelt Nkana Refinery, Kitwe, copperbelt	Active
1957	Vedanta Resources Plc	Ore Mine to smelter	US$25 million*	Copper anodes LME A grade copper cathodes	Nchanga copper smelter	311,000 tons of copper anode (blister copper); 3,000 tons of copper-cobalt alloy	Konkola Mine, Chililabombwe, copperbelt Nchanga Copper mine, Chingola, copperbelt Nkana Refinery, Kitwe, copperbelt	Active
1957	Vedanta Resources Plc	Ore Mine to smelter	US$25 million*	Copper anodes LME A grade copper cathodes	Nkana Copper Electrowinning Refinery	300,000 tons of copper cathode	Konkola Mine, Chililabombwe, copperbelt Nchanga Copper mine, Chingola, copperbelt Nkana Refinery, Kitwe, copperbelt	Active

*2004 Acquisition Cost

=== Nkana smelter ===
The smelter produces high grade anodes, which are electrolytically refined. Sulphur dioxide gas produced by the converters is converted into sulphuric acid which is then used at the Tailings Leach Plant in Nchanga for recovering oxide copper. The smelter also produces discard slag from the reverbs that is rich in cobalt which is stored for future reclamation. This smelter was part of the Konkola Copper Mine's operation at privatisation and has subsequently closed.

=== Nkana refinery ===
The Nkana Copper Refinery produces electrolytically refined copper in the form of cathodes. The copper meets the LME premium quality grade. The tankhouse has a capacity of about 180,000 tons of finished copper per annum. It has been expanded to accommodate the increased anode production from the Nchanga smelter.

=== Nkana acid plants ===
There are two single contact sulphuric acid plants at Smelterco, namely the No. 3 and No. 4 plants. No. 3, the largest, is still operational. The plant has a design capacity of 1,050 tons of acid per day.

=== Konkola deep mine and concentrator ===
A new concentrator was commissioned at Konkola in 2008.

=== Nchanga open pit mine and concentrators ===
There are two Concentrators. An East and West Mill.

=== Nchanga tailings leach plant ===
The Nchanga Tailings Leach Plant (TLP), one of the largest of its kind in the world, processes tailings from the Nchanga concentrators and stockpiled tailings to produce copper. The TLP extracts copper directly to cathodes from concentrate solution using electrolysis.

=== Nchanga smelter ===
The Nchanga smelter was commissioned in 2008, incorporating technology from Outotec, Finland. The smelter processes ore from Konkola, Nchanga and other third party concentrates and it has a capacity of 311,000t pa.

=== Rokana mine ===
Rokana Mine is a mining company that owns Mindola Underground Mine, which mines minerals such as carrollite, chalcopyrite and libethenite. Other minerals mined are bornite, pyrite, chalcocite.

There is extensive mine tailings around this mine. See Copperbelt Province for the history of the copper-mining industry in this region.

=== Other mining ===
There are two small tailings dams right in the city centre. There are also small-scale emerald mines in the area.

== Kagem emerald mine ==
Kagem Emerald Mine, located in Lufwanyama, 45 km southwest of Kitwe, Copperbelt Province.

Kagem Emerald Mine Parent Company Gemfields generated US$330.3 million (ZMW 5.7 billion^{(i)}) Revenue from 1 July 2021 through 30 June 2022 from its 75%-owned Kagem emerald mine, in Zambia; its 75%-owned Montepuez ruby mine, in Mozambique; and Gemfields’ wholly owned iconic luxury brand Fabergé.

In August 2022, Kagem Mining Limited projected growth in emerald production from the current levels of 37.993 kg to 50.758 kg in the next five years.

In 2023 Kagem Emerald Mine generated 1.82 billion kwacha (US$89.9 million) in annual revenue.

== Kariba minerals ltd ==
One of the oldest semi-precious gemstone mines in Zambia, located in Mapatizya, Sinazongwe, Southern Province.

Mine is 100% owned by ZCCM Investment Holdings (ZCCM-IH).

Main product is Amethyst.

Annual production up to 800 tonnes per annum.

== Grizzly Emerald Mine ==
Grizzly Mining Limited was incorporated as mining company in 1997.

Grizzly Mining Limited is engaged in the production, processing, grading, marketing and supply of emeralds and beryl.

The company produces gemstones from its mine in Lufwanyama, Kitwe, Copperbelt Province.

The mine produces 60,000,000 carats of emeralds per year.

In October 2019, Grizzly Mining Company, Zambia’s second largest emerald mine unearthed a historic 50-kilogramme multi-million-dollar emerald crystal.

In August 2023, the Grizzly Emerald Limited generated record sales of 984.25 million kwacha (U$48.63-million).

In March 2024, Grizzly Emerald Limited generated 494.6 million kwacha (US$19-million) worth of sales.

== Chibuluma copper mine ==
Year opened	Current owner(s)	Facility Type	Construction / Acquisition Cost	Product(s)	Capacity	Location	Status
1961	Jinchuan Group 85% ZCCM Investment Holdings (ZCCM-IH) 15%	Ore Mine to Concentrator	N/A	Copper Concentrate	10,000 tonnes per annum	Kalulushi, Kalulushi District, Copperbelt.	Active

The Chibuluma (East) ore body was opened up in 1951.

The Chibuluma West ore body (famously known as 7 Shaft) was opened in 1963 and exhausted and closed by 2005.

The Chibuluma Mine South ore body was discovered in 1969.

In 2013, Chibuluma Mine became the first mine in the country to appoint a Zambian National, Jackson Sikamo, as General Manager since the privatisation of the Mines began in 2000.

== Luanshya copper mine ==
=== Baluba mine ===
Year opened	Current owner(s)	Facility Type	Construction / Acquisition Cost	Product(s)	Capacity	Location	Status
1973	China Nonferrous Metal Mining Co (CNMC) 80% ZCCM Investment Holdings (ZCCM-IH) 20%	Ore Mine to Smelter	US$50 million*	Blister Copper Cathodes	30,000 tonnes per annum	Luanshya, Copperbelt Province	Active

*2009 Acquisition Cost

In September 2023, China Nonferrous Metal Mining Co (CNMC) announced it would recapitalize Luanshya Copper Mine with ZMW 12.5 Billion kwacha (US$600 million) to reopen Shaft 28 which was discommissioned in 2014 due to high operational costs.

=== Muliashi north mine and the muliashi leach plant ===
The Muliashi Project is an integrated mining and leaching project in Luanshya, Copperbelt Province.

== Kalumbila copper mine ==
Kalumbila Mine, in Kalumbila District, North-Western Province.

Year opened	Current owner(s)	Facility Type	Construction / Acquisition Cost	Product(s)	Capacity	Location	Status
2016	First Quantum Minerals (FQM) 100%	Ore Mine to Concentrator	US$2.9 billion	Copper Concentrate	230,000 tonnes per annum	Kalumbila District, North-Western Province	Active

== Kansanshi copper and gold mine ==
=== Kansanshi mine and kansanshi copper smelter ===
Kansanshi mine, in Kansanshi, North-Western Province is the eight largest copper mine in the world, with two open pits.

The Central Bank of Zambia (BOZ) has been purchasing refined gold from Kansanshi Mine from January, 2021 to boost its gold reserves.

In May 2022, First Quantum Minerals approved a US$1.25 billion expansion of the mine following the host government's commitment to a predictable investing environment. The company will invest US$900 million in the processing plant and mine fleet and the remaining US$350 million will be for pre-stripping of the South East Dome pit.

Year opened	Current owner(s)	Facility Type	Construction / Acquisition Cost	Product(s)	Capacity	Location	Status
2004* 2015**	First Quantum Minerals (FQM) 80% ZCCM Investments Holdings (ZCCM-IH) 20%	Ore Mine to Smelter	US$250 million* US$900 million**	Finished Copper Anodes Refined Gold	336,000 tonnes per annum 120,000 Oz per annum	Solwezi, Copperbelt Province	Active

*Original capital construction cost prior to Smelter Facility

**Smelter Facility

In August 2022, FQM reported a 5.2% decline in Quarter on Quarter (QOQ) copper production at Kansanshi Mine. This was a decrease of 2,180 tonnes to result in copper production of 39,719 tonnes.

== Lumwana copper mine ==
Lumwana mine in Lumwana, North-Western Province.

Year opened	Current owner(s)	Facility Type	Construction / Acquisition Cost	Product(s)	Capacity	Location	Status
2009*	Barrick Gold	Ore Mine to Concentrator	US$1.0 billion	Copper Concentrate Unprocessed Uranium byproduct	140,000 tonnes per annum N/A tonnes per annum	Lumwana, North-Western Province.	Active

*Inaugurated in April 2009 by Equinox Minerals.

In January 2024, Barrick Gold announced that the Lumwana copper mine’s Super Pit expansion project was to be accelerated with first production scheduled for 2028. It was reported that the 51.7 billion kwacha (US$ 2bn) project is expected to raise the mine's annual production to around 240,000 tons per annum with a 30-year life of mine.

== Kasenseli gold mine ==
In early August 2019, in Mwinilunga, gold deposits were discovered and confirmed by experts from the Ministry of Mines and Mineral Development. The Government, through its subsidiary, ZCCM Investments Holdings (ZCCM-IH), intends to set up a gold mine in Chief Chibwika's area where the gold deposits have been discovered. in March 2020, ZCCM-IH started buying gold from informal miners via ZCCM Gold Company. The extent of the gold reserves is yet to be established and ZCCM Gold Company has injected approximately ZMW 45 million (U$2.2 million, 2020 Spot Exchange rate) for the initial phase of the Kasenseli Gold Mine Project.

The Central Bank of Zambia (BOZ) has been purchasing dore gold from Kasenseli Mine since December, 2020, through the Zambia Gold Company to boost its gold reserves.

== Chambishi copper mine ==
=== Chambishi main orebody and chambishi west orebody project ===
Year opened	Current owner(s)	Facility Type	Construction / Acquisition Cost	Product(s)	Capacity	Location	Status
1998* 2007**	Non-Ferrous China Africa Mining Plc (NFCA) of China Nonferrous Metal Mining Co (CNMC) 85% ZCCM Investments Holdings (ZCCM-IH) 15%	Ore Mine to Smelter	US$100 million**	Copper Anodes	24,000 tonnes per annum	Kalulushi, Copperbelt Province	Active

*Acquisition of Main Orebody by NFCA, ** 2007 Commissioning of the West Orebody

=== Chambishi copper smelter (ccs) ===
Year opened	Current owner(s)	Facility Type	Construction / Acquisition Cost	Product(s)	Capacity	Location	Status
2008* 2010**	China Nonferrous Metal Mining Co (CNMC)	Smelter	US$300 million* US$220 million**	Blister Copper Cathodes Copper Anodes	250,000 tonnes per annum	Kalulushi, Copperbelt Province	Active

*Phase I; **Phase II (Expansion)

=== Chambishi metals ===
Chambishi Metals is a Copper Smelting Plant, located in Kalulushi District, Copperbelt owned and operated by Eurasian Resources Group (ERG). It has been on care and maintenance since January 2020

Year opened	Current owner(s)	Facility Type	Construction / Acquisition Cost	Product(s)	Capacity	Location	Status
1932*	Eurasian Resources Group (ERG) 90% ZCCM Investment Holdings (ZCCM-IH) 10%	Ore Mine to Smelter	US$ $300 million**	Copper Metal Cobalt Metal Gypsum	*Chambishi cobalt plant: 27,000 tons of copper cathode per annum and 6,000 tons of cobalt metal per annum N/A tonnes per annum	Chililabombwe, Copperbelt Province	Care and maintenance

*As part of Nkana Mine

**Estimate off ERG acquisition of ENYA Holding.

=== Chambishi southeast project ===
Year opened	Current owner(s)	Facility Type	Construction / Acquisition Cost	Product(s)	Capacity	Location	Status
2018	China Nonferrous Metal Mining Co (CNMC)	Ore Mine to Concentrator	US$830 million	Copper Concentrate Cobalt Concentatre	63,000 tonnes per annum 1,000 tonnes per annum	Kalulushi, Copperbelt Province	Active

== Mwambashi copper mine ==
Year opened	Current owner(s)	Facility Type	Construction / Acquisition Cost	Product(s)	Capacity	Location	Status
2017	Sino-Metals Leach Zambia Limited owned by SINO Metals of China	Ore Mine to Concentrator	US$70 million	Blister Copper Cathodes	10,000 tonnes per annum	Kalulushi, Copperbelt Province	Active

In 2018, Sino-Metals Leach Zambia Limited recorded 9,312 tonnes copper production up from 7,100 tonnes in 2017.

== Lubambe copper and cobalt mine ==
Year opened	Current owner(s)	Facility Type	Construction / Acquisition Cost	Product(s)	Capacity	Location	Status
2013	EMR Capital 80% ZCCM Investments Holdings (ZCCM-IH) 20%	Ore Mine to Concentrator	US$97.1 million	Copper	45,000 tonnes per annum	Chililabombwe, Copperbelt Province	Active

The mine has 200,000 million tonne ore body with a seven (7) million tonnes of copper at a high-grade rate of eight (8) percent and large quantities of cobalt.

Lubambe copper mine was originally a joint venture between African Rainbow Minerals (ARM) and Vale until EMR Capital acquired controlling interest in 2017.

== Mimbula copper project ==
The Mimbula Copper Project is a copper rich oxide and sulphide deposit, located on the outskirts of the town of Chingola on a mining licence held by Moxico Resources’also kalengwa copper mine in mufumbwe

 Zambian unit. Moxico Resources is a development and exploration mining company incorporated in the UK.[94]

Moxico holds an 85% ownership in the license holding company and 15% is held by Moxico's Zambian partners. The mining license was granted in May 2017, with a validity for 25 years.

The British firm plans to invest US$100 million in the mine expansion.

In 2021, Moxico Resources began construction of a 10,000 tonne Leach Pad, Solvent Extraction and Electrowinning Plant. The Plant is expected to be operational by Q2 2022 and is planned to be expanded in phases.

Mimbula Mine was commissioned in March 2023. There are plans to expand the project from the current 10,000 metric tons per annum output to 56,000 metric tons.

== Chitini gold project ==
It is a Gold exploration Project located halfway between the towns of Kapiri Mposhi and Mkushi, Central Province.

== Consolidated gold company zambia (cgcz) ==
Gold processing and refining in Rufunsa District, Lusaka Province.

It is a joint venture between Karma Mining and Mineral Development Company Limited (55%) of Sudan and ZCCM Investments Holdings (ZCCM-IH) (45%) signed in 2020.

The plant was set up at a cost of about US$3.5 million.

The site has 20 gold milling plants with a combined Capacity of 90 kg per annum and a vat leaching plant with capacity 210 kg per annum.

== Munali nickel mine ==
Munali Nickel Mine, in Mazabuka, Southern Province.

In September 2006 following a positive feasibility study, Albidon Limited of Australia obtained permits and approvals to mine Nickel in Mazabuka. The initial project development required more than U$180 million, which was funded by debt financing from Barclays Capital and the European Investment Bank and equity from Albidon Limited, JINCHUAN mining group of China and ZCCM Investment Holdings .

In April 2007, then Zambian President, Levy Mwanawasa launched the Munali Nickel Project at a ground breaking ceremony. The mine would be built and operated under the venture's special purpose vehicle Albidon Zambia Limited (AZL).

AZL commenced mining and production of nickel concentrates in April 2008. Operations were suspended in 2009 because of poor market conditions. From the peak of the 2008 financial crisis the Mine would struggle for many years.

It was briefly owned and run by JINCHUAN mining group of China from 2010. JINCHUAN would invest U$37 million and employ about 350 workers. However, the mine was shut down again in 2011 due to cashflow problems.

A joint venture Mabiza Resources between Consolidated Nickel Mines Plc of the United kingdom and CE Mining took ownership in 2014 but delayed capital injection which led the government of Zambia at the time to threaten repossession of the asset. From 2015 the JV has placed in U$50 million investment to reboot operations at the Munali Nickel Mine. The Mine recommenced operations in 2019.

The mine is managed by an all-Zambian management team and currently has a workforce of 380 people, of which 10% are women. Munali currently exports over 10% high quality Nickel concentrate. The mine is expected to generate 3,300t of Ni in 2020, which is anticipated to reach 4,000t in 2021. Although it is billed as a nickel project, Munali also contains commercial quantities of copper, cobalt and platinum group metals (PGMs).

== Enterprise nickel project ==
The Enterprise Nickel Project is an open-pit nickel mine, owned by First Quantum Minerals of Canada, 12 km from the Kalumbila Mine. The Kalumbila Mine processing facility will be used to produce nickel concentrate output.

The Project, estimated at U$275 million, was expected to be operational at the end of 2021 but as of March 2022 was still yet to be operational. In May 2022, First Quantum Minerals approved an additional US$100 million investment the project, which is now expected to commence production in 2023.

In May 2022, following questions about whether FQM held a licence to mine Nickel in Zambia, the company confirmed that it held a valid license up to 2036 to mine and produce Nickel concentrate.

At the projected capacity of 30,000 tons of Nickel annually, FQM is expected to rake in about US$1 billion in revenue annually at May 2022 market prices.

In July 2022, Zambian President Hakainde Hichilema officiated at the ground breaking ceremony for the project.

In August 2023, the Enterprise Nickel Mine was commissioned. Production at the Nickel mine concentrator had commenced and the mining firm was expected to ramp up annual production to more than 30,000 tonnes of Nickel.

== Kafue steel plant ==
Located in Kafue, Central Province.

Owned by Universal Mining and Chemical Industries Limited (UMCIL), which is part of the Trade Kings Group of Companies.

UMCIL owns Zambia's first commercial iron ore mine, Sanje Hill, built for a cost of ZMW 70.0 million (US$10 million - 2016 Exchange Rate) and located in Nampundwe, Shibuyunji District, Central Province.

The Steel Plant Capacity is 240,000 metric tonnes of steel per annum.

== Maamba coal mine ==
Maamba Coal Mine, in Maamba, Sinazongwe District, Southern Province.

Maamba is the home to the largest Coal Plant in Zambia at 300MW, built for U$750million and operated by Maamba Collieries Limited (MCL) which as of 2010 is 100% owned by Nava Bharat Ventures Limited (NVBL) of India.

In 2021, Maamba Collieries Limited announced they were interested in increasing the capacity from 300 to 600MW.

== Broken Hill Mine ==
- Broken Hill Lead-Zinc Mine, in Kabwe, Central Province.
- Kabwe mine: lead mine operating from 1906 to 1994, leaving a legacy of pollution.

== Mutanga uranium project ==
Mutanga Uranium Project, in Siavonga, Southern Province.

31 km North of Siavonga and north of Lake Kariba, there are 5 main Uranium Deposits: Mutanga, Dibwe, Dibwe East, Njame, and Gwabe explored under The Mutanga Uranium Project. The Canadian Toronto Stock Exchange (TSX) listed GoviEx acquired 100% of the Mutanga Project in 2016. In March 2022, GoviEx announced that the Project is forecast to start production in 2027 and could be the lowest capital intensive uranium project in Africa.

== Ndola lime company limited ==
Founded in 1931, and located in Masaiti, Copperbelt Province.

100% owned by ZCCM Investments Holdings (ZCCM-IH).

Product: Limestone

== Kabundi manganese mine ==
Kabundi Manganese Mine is located in Kabundi, Serenje, Central Province.

Operated by Kabundi Resources Ltd which is 100% owned by ZCCM Investments Holdings (ZCCM-IH) and encompasses a Large-Scale Exploration Licence for exploration for commodities which include manganese, cobalt, copper, zinc, limestone and precious minerals.

Investment: US$2.4 million in a manganese plant.

Capacity: 20,000 tonnes of manganese per annum.

== Kampumba – manganese project ==
Located in Kapiri Mposhi, Central Province.

== Ndabala – manganese project ==
Covers the Mansa-Chipili and Mkushi-Serenje and belts in Luapula and Central Provinces respectively.

== Sable zinc refinery ==
Location: Kabwe, Central Province.

Acquired by Jubilee Metals Group of South Africa for US$12.0 million in 2019.

Capacity: 8,000 tonnes per annum (tpa) of Zinc, 1,500tpa of Vanadium and 15,000tpa of Lead.

== Star zinc project ==
Small scale but high-grade deposit of Zinc located near Lusaka, Lusaka Province. In March 2021, Siege Mining acquired the large scale exploration license and project ownership for US$750,000 from Galileo Resources of the United Kingdom. Galileo Resources will also be paid a royalty by Siege Mining on potential zinc sales from the project, based on the zinc grade.

== Kashitu zinc project ==
Location: Kabwe, Central Province.

Owned by Galileo Resources.

Potential exists for a large scale mine of medium to low grade Zinc.

== Mutinta jewellery - diamond processing plant ==
US$3.2 million diamond and gemstone processing plant, with a capacity of 15,000-25,000 carats per annum.

== Other projects ==
=== Arc minerals and anglo american plc jv ===
In May 2022, Arc Minerals and Anglo American plc formed a joint venture for copper exploration in the North Western Province of Zambia.

=== Luansobe copper project ===
In December 2021, Galileo Resources entered into a US$500,000 joint venture with Zambian firm Statunga Investments Limited for small scale exploration licence 15 km to the northwest of Mopani's Mufulira Mine site.

Reports suggest the potential for significant copper resources are present.

=== Mokambo copper mine ===
In August 2012 Chinese firm Changfa Mineral Resources acquired the Mokambo Copper mine project in Mufulira on the Democratic Republic of Congo border and it is expected to create around 3,000 new jobs when it begins full-scale operations in 2012.

=== Mwashia resources limited ===
In August 2021, Mwashia Resources Limited of Kitwe entered into a JV with Luangwa Minerals Ltd, a subsidiary of Tertiary Minerals plc of the United Kingdom. Luangwa Minerals Ltd entered into an option agreement with Mwashia Resources Ltd to acquire up to a 90% joint venture interest in the Jack's Hill Project and four other large exploration licences in Zambia considered prospective for copper. The Jack's Hill Project is located in Luanshya, Copperbelt Province.

In October 2021, Mwashia Resources Limited, obtained approval from the Zambia Environmental Management Agency (ZEMA) after meeting the requirements under the ZEMA Act Number 12 of 2011 and the Environmental Impact Assessment requirements to explore for copper in Kapiri Mposhi, Central Province.

In May 2022, the company commenced explorations for a large scale copper mine with the aid of mining exploration company Geo Quest of Lusaka and initial drilled samples presented between 1.5 and 2.5 percent grade of copper at a sub-surface depth of less than 60 meters.

=== Project roan concentrator ===
Located in Luanshya, Copperbelt.

Copper and Cobalt Project owned by Jubilee Minerals of South Africa.

By May 2022 the project had created approximately 800 permanent jobs.

In June 2022, Jubilee Metals commissioned its Cobalt Refining Circuit.

In September 2022, Jubilee Metals announced that its Southern Copper Refining Plant attained its nameplate capacity of 110 tonnes per hour.

=== Mukai and mushima north projects ===
Located in North-Western Province

In September 2022, Tertiary Minerals signed a cooperation agreement with First Quantum Minerals (FQM) to explore the two projects.

=== Deep-south resources projects ===
As of October 2022, Deep-South Resources a Toronto Stock Exchange (TSXV: DSM) listed mineral exploration and development company is undertaking exploration work at its three newly acquired large-scale copper exploration licences in the centre of the Zambian Copperbelt. The Projects include:

- Luanshya West Project
- Chililabombwe Project
- Mpongwe Project

=== SilverKing Copper Mine ===
Located in Mumbwa District, Central Province.

In April 2024, Xtract Resources and Oval Mining entered into a joint venture agreement. The agreement would see Xtract Resources acquire a 70% stake in the mine and its associated exploration license.

jifumpa copper mine is located 96 km in kasempa district of north western province which onwerd by ruida resource katoka mema gold mine in kasempa owned by vein construction,also dengwe gold mine,kinkonge gold mine in mufumbwe musakashi emerold mine in mapunga area of chief mujimazovu area in mushindamo district of north western province
