= M4 road (Zambia) =

Road in the Copperbelt Province of Zambia

M4 Road

Route information
- Length: 85 km (53 mi)

Major junctions
- East end: T3 in Ndola
- M5 in Mufulira
- West end: T3 near Kitwe

Location
- Country: Zambia
- Provinces: Copperbelt
- Major cities: Ndola, Mufulira, Kitwe

Highway system
- Transport in Zambia
← M3	→ M5

The M4 road is a road in the Copperbelt Province of Zambia. The road connects the city of Ndola (Capital of the Copperbelt) with the town of Mufulira and extends to connect Mufulira with the city of Kitwe. As it is a v-shaped route, the M4 road starts and ends at a junction with the T3 road.

It is the only route that connects the rest of the Copperbelt Province to the town of Mufulira and to the Congo Pedicle road (which is a shortcut to Luapula Province via the Congo Pedicle).

== Route ==
The M4 begins at a roundabout by Levy Mwanawasa Stadium in the city of Ndola. It begins at a junction with the T3 road (Luanshya Road; Ndola-Kitwe Dual Carriageway). The M4 begins by going 60 km (37 mi) north-west to the town of Mufulira.

At Kamalasha, 17 km (11 mi) north of the Levy Mwanawasa Stadium roundabout, the M4 meets a road which goes eastwards and crosses the near border with DR Congo, with the town of Sakania on the other side of the border. It is one of the two borders which provides access to the Congo Pedicle Area of DR Congo from the Copperbelt Province of Zambia.

It enters Mufulira in a northwesterly direction as Ndola Road, bypassing the Mufulira Airport. South of Fairview at the Kitwe Road junction, as Ndola Road becomes the M5 road northwards and proceeds through Mufulira Central to become the Congo Pedicle road, the M4 becomes Kitwe Road by way of a left turn.

From Mufulira, the M4 exits the town in a southwesterly direction and goes for 25 km (16 mi), crossing the Kafue River, to reach its terminus at another junction with the T3 road (Kitwe-Chingola Dual Carriageway) in the settlement of Sabina, 15 km (9 mi) north-west of the city centre of Kitwe & 10 km (6 mi) south-east of the town of Chambishi.

== Road Importance ==
The Congo Pedicle road is an important road, as it provides a direct shortcut for people travelling from the Copperbelt Province and neighbouring provinces to the Luapula Province (and Northern Province) in northern Zambia. It is a road maintained by Zambia through Congolese territory. The road is from Mufulira, through the Mokambo border and the Congo Pedicle Area of DR Congo, to the Levy Mwanawasa Bridge at the Chembe border post, with the road continuing to the Chembe border and the town of Mansa (capital of Luapula Province). The short 18km section from Mufulira Town Centre to the Congo Border is designated as the M5 road.

As the Congo Pedicle road provides a shorter route to the Luapula Province, it makes the M4 road an important road, as it is the only road that provides the rest of the Copperbelt Province with access to the town of Mufulira and the start of the Congo Pedicle road. Despite being in a poor condition, both the short western section from Kitwe to Mufulira and the long eastern section from Ndola to Mufulira are declared as important roads, as they provide access to a shorter route to Luapula Province than the longer route through the towns of Kapiri Mposhi and Serenje in Central Province.

The Congo Pedicle road proceeds as the shortcut to the Luapula Province, which is a route for people who plan to save on fuel between the two parts of Zambia and who plan to avoid spending hours on the road.

== Ndola-Mufulira road concession ==
On 16 October 2023, the Government of Zambia signed a Public–private partnership (concession) agreement with Jaswin Ports Limited for the rehabilitation & maintenance of the section of the M4 connecting Ndola and Mufulira (amounting to 61 kilometres). The concession agreement is for a period of 22 years (up to 2045) and the project is expected to cost $76.1 million. Plans include rehabilitating the entire road connecting the two towns (which was in a poor state as of 2023) for the first 3 years, working on the one-kilometre access road to the Sakania border with DR Congo (17 km north of the Levy Mwanawasa Stadium roundabout in Ndola), constructing a toll gate on the road and working on infrastructure at the Sakania border on the Zambian side.

A groundbreaking ceremony was held for this project on 23 October 2024 by Minister Charles Milupi.

On 10 August 2025, the Ministry of Infrastructure, Housing and Urban Development announced that the first 17-kilometre stretch from the Levy Mwanawasa Stadium roundabout up to the Sakania border turn-off in Kamalasha had been substantially completed. The ministry also announced that the Tom Mtine Toll Plaza on the same stretch had been substantially completed and was ready for operations, while stating that the remaining 44-kilometre stretch between Kamalasha and Mufulira would also receive a toll gate.

In March 2026, the Copperbelt provincial minister, Elisha Matambo, toured the newly-opened 17-kilometre stretch and concluded that a 4-kilometre stretch near the Tom Mtine Toll Plaza had not been done in accordance with construction standards and he proceeded to request for Jaswin Ports Limited to rework on the identified stretch of road.

== M5 Road ==
M5 Road

Route information
- Length: 18 km (11 mi)

Major junctions
- South-west end: M4 in Mufulira
- North-east end: Congo Pedicle road at the Mokambo border with DR Congo

Location
- Country: Zambia
- Provinces: Copperbelt
- Major cities: Mufulira

Highway system
- Transport in Zambia
← M4	→ M6

The M5 road is the short road that connects Mufulira with the Mokambo Border and the Congo Pedicle road (Shortcut to Luapula Province).

It begins as Chatulinga Street at the junction with the M4 road (Ndola Road; Kitwe Road) south of Mufulira town centre, going northwards. At the junction with West Shafts Road just west of the Mufulira Railway and Mufulira Golf Course (east of the Mopani Copper Mine), the road turns towards the north-east and goes for 15 km (9 mi) to reach the Mokambo Border Post with DR Congo and become the Congo Pedicle road.

It becomes the M3 road at the Luapula end of the Congo Pedicle road. The Congo Pedicle road is designated as the N36 route on the DR Congo road network.

=== Mufulira-Mokambo road concession ===
On 15 November 2024, the Government of Zambia signed a Public–private partnership (concession) agreement with Jasworld Ports Limited for the rehabilitation & maintenance of the M5 connecting Mufulira and the Mokambo border (amounting to 15.5 kilometres). The concession agreement is for a period of 22 years. The signing ceremony was hosted by the Minister of Finance (Situmbeko Musokotwane) and the Road Development Agency in Mufulira District and the project is expected to cost $56.7 million.

Plans include upgrading the entire 15-kilometre route between Mufulira and the Mokambo border to bituminous standard within the first two years, modernising the border facilities and constructing a toll gate on the road. In January 2026, it was reported that roadworks would be completed in November 2026.

== See also ==
- Roads in Zambia
- Congo Pedicle road
