= M3 road (Zambia) =

Road in Zambia

M3 Road

Route information
- Length: 434 km (270 mi)

Major junctions
- Northeast end: M1 in Kasama
- M13 near Chipili
- Southwest end: Congo Pedicle road at the Chembe border post with DR Congo

Location
- Country: Zambia
- Provinces: Northern, Luapula
- Major cities: Kasama, Mansa

Highway system
- Transport in Zambia
← M2	→ M4

The M3 road is a road in northern Zambia that connects Kasama in the Northern Province with the Congo Pedicle border at Chembe in the Luapula Province via Luwingu and Mansa. The road contains two tollgates between Kasama and Mansa.

The south-western section of the M3 road is the first section of a shortcut that exists between the Luapula and Copperbelt provinces of Zambia, as the area in-between the 2 provinces is part of the Democratic Republic of the Congo. At the Chembe Bridge, the M3 becomes the Congo Pedicle road to the Copperbelt, which is a road maintained by Zambia on Congolese Territory.

== Route ==
The M3 road begins in Kasama (Capital of the Northern Province), at a junction with the M1 road in the city centre next to the Kasama Golf Course. It goes westwards for 24 kilometres, bypassing Kasama Airport, to reach a junction with the D20 road, which provides access to the Chishimba Falls and the town of Mporokoso in the north-west.

From the D20 junction, the M3 continues westwards for 135 kilometres, through the Kalense Toll Plaza, to the town of Luwingu in the district of the same name. From Luwingu, the road goes westwards for 100 kilometres, crossing into Luapula Province, to reach a t-junction in the settlement of Mwenda in Chipili District, where it meets the southern terminus of the M13 road.

As the M13 road ends at this junction, the M3 road becomes the road southwards. It proceeds for 23 kilometres to the town of Chipili. It then proceeds southwards for 55 kilometres, through the Ntoposhi Toll Plaza, to the town of Mansa (Capital of the Luapula Province). In Mansa, the M3 meets the D94 road, which provides access to the resort town of Samfya on the south-western shore of Lake Bangweulu in the east.

From Mansa, the M3 road goes southwards for 90 kilometres to reach the Chembe Border, where it crosses the Luapula River as the Mwanawasa Bridge (named after Levy Mwanawasa; also known as the Chembe Bridge) into the Democratic Republic of the Congo to become the Congo Pedicle road, which is a road maintained by Zambia on Congolese territory and which is used as a shortcut for motorists travelling from the Luapula Province (and Northern Province) to the Copperbelt Province (and North-Western Province).

It becomes the M5 road at the Copperbelt end of the Congo Pedicle Road. The Congo Pedicle Road is designated as the N36 route on the DR Congo road network.

== Congo Pedicle road ==
The Congo Pedicle road is an important road, as it provides motorists in towns located in the Luapula Province (and Northern Province) with easier access to towns located in the Copperbelt and North-Western provinces.

It provides a much shorter route than the very-long circular route through Samfya, Serenje and Kapiri Mposhi for motorists wanting to travel from Mansa to the north-western area of the country and to the country's industrial and commercial hub of the Copperbelt.

The M3 road is the road that provides access to the Congo Pedicle territory and eventually the town of Mufulira in the Copperbelt Province from the towns of the Luapula province, making it an important route for motorists planning to save on fuel and planning to avoid spending hours on the road.

== See also ==
- Roads in Zambia
- Congo Pedicle road
