= M13 road (Zambia) =

Road in the Luapula Province of Zambia

M13 Road

Route information
- Length: 88.5 km (55.0 mi)

Major junctions
- South end: M3 near Chipili
- North end: D19 in Kawambwa

Location
- Country: Zambia
- Provinces: Luapula
- Major cities: Chipili, Kawambwa

Highway system
- Transport in Zambia
← M12	→ M14

The M13 is a road in the Luapula Province of Zambia that connects Chipili with Kawambwa.

== Route ==
It starts at a junction with the M3 road (Kasama-Mansa Road) in the settlement of Mwenda in Chipili District (approximately 23 kilometres north of the Chipili town centre) and it heads north for 88 kilometres to end in the town centre of Kawambwa at a junction with the D19 road, which goes to the town of Mporokoso in the east and the towns of Mbereshi and Nchelenge in the west.

== See also ==
- Roads in Zambia
