= Kansanshi mine =

Copper and gold mine in North-Western, Zambia

- Interactive map of Kansanshi mine
- Location: North-Western Province, Zambia; 12°08′36″S 26°23′09″E
- Products: Copper, Gold
- Company: Kansanshi Mining Plc a JV between First Quantum Minerals and ZCCM Investments Holdings

Kansanshi Mine is a large open-pit copper and gold mine in Solwezi in the North-Western Province of Zambia. The mine is approximately 14 km (8.7 mi) north of the town of Solwezi.

It is owned by First Quantum Minerals (FQM) (80%) and ZCCM Investments Holdings (20%). The mine is operated by Kansanshi Mining Plc. On December 1, 2022, ZCCM converted its dividend rights to a 3.1% revenue royalty.

In May 2022, First Quantum approved the US$1.25 billion 25 million tonne per annum S3 Expansion following the host government's commitment to a predictable investing environment. The expansion aimed to adapt operations to deeper, lower-grade sulphide ore. It was commissioned in Q1 2025, and in July 2025, it reached the final stages of commissioning with the first ore fed through the expansion operations ahead of schedule. The S3 Expansion achieved commercial production on December 1, 2025. With the completion of the S3 Expansion, the total processing capacity at Kansanshi is approximately 53 million tonnes per annum.

In August 2025, First Quantum announced a gold streaming agreement with Royal Gold, which provides Royal Gold with a percentage of gold mined linked to copper production.

== See also ==
- Mining in Zambia
- Economy of Zambia
