= Jewis Chabi =

Zambian Independent MP for Chipili (2016–2021)

Member of the National Assembly for Chipili
- In office August 2016 – August 2021
- Preceded by: Davies Mwila
- Succeeded by: Paul Chala

Personal details
- Born: 25 November 1979 (age 46) Zambia
- Party: Patriotic Front (before 2016); Independent (2016 - 2021); Democratic Party (2021 - present)
- Education: Diploma in Public Administration; Form V
- Profession: Public administrator

Jewis Chabi (born 25 November 1979) is a Zambian public administrator and politician who served as an independent Member of Parliament for Chipili constituency from 2016 to 2021. He succeeded a Patriotic Front nominee and later received an official pardon from PF leadership. After the 2021 general election, he became the national secretary for the Democratic Party.

== Parliamentary career ==
Chabi stood as an independent MP candidate in Chipili constituency at the 2016 general election and was elected, defeating the PF’s preferred candidate in Chipili. After the election, President Edgar Lungu pardoned him and other Independent lawmakers who had previously been associated with PF but stood as independents.

Chabi served as a Back Bench MP with committee appointments, including membership in the Parliamentary Reforms and Modernisation Committee from October 2016 to May 2021; and the Committee on Energy, Water Development and Tourism from September 2017 to May 2021.

== Notable incidents ==
In December 2016, Chabi was involved in a dispute with another MP during a debate over overtime allowances, which nearly resulted in a physical confrontation in the assembly.

In March 2019, the state revealed a case of accusing Chabi for maliciously damaging PF property in 2017, resulting in the matter being dismissed with no charges.

== See also ==
- Chipili (constituency)
