= Mining in Zambia =

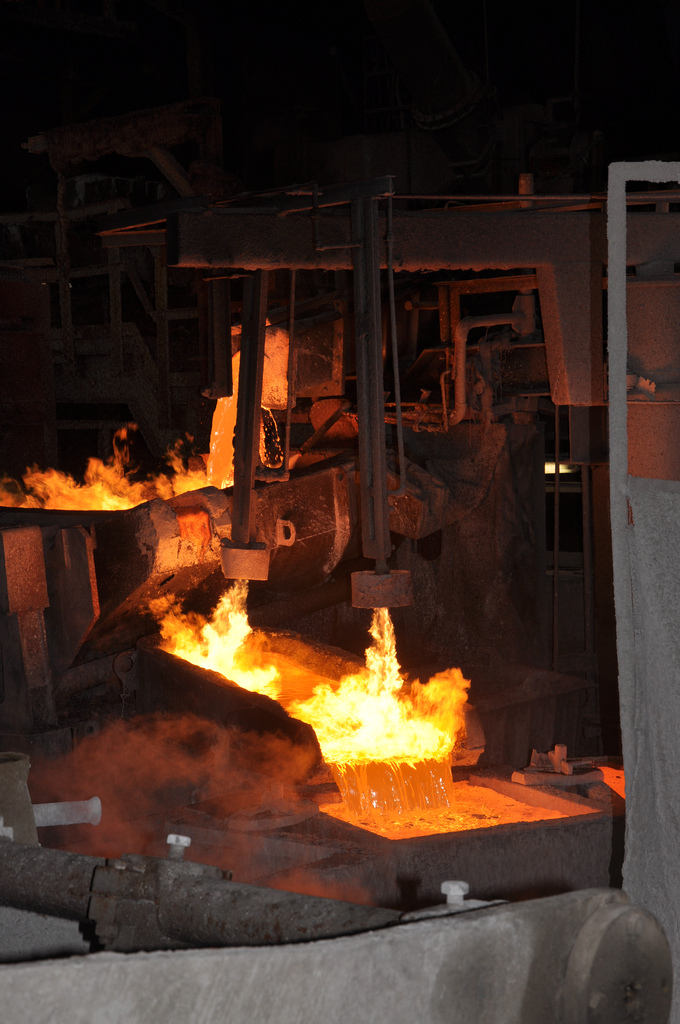
Mopani Mine in Zambia

Mining in Zambia produces several minerals and is a critical part of the country's economy. Copper comprises 70% of Zambia's total export earnings, and the country produces about 20% of the world's emeralds. Mineral resources are distributed throughout the country. Zambia produced 763,287 metric tons of copper in 2022.

Mining was originally clustered in centers of mining operations along the Copperbelt, like Konkola and Kitwe. In the last two decades, following the issuance of mining and exploration licences by the Zambia Environmental Management Agency (ZEMA) operational large commercial mines have stretched to the Central, North-Western and Southern Provinces. The sector is expected to see and even more significant boost with the more accommodating taxation regime introduced in 2022 and the flow-on effect of the implementation of the cooperating agreement signed between Zambia and Democratic Republic of the Congo (DRC) for the electric vehicle battery supply chain that will require abundant battery metals and battery precursors.

In October 2022, the Zambian Ministry of Mines and Minerals Development gave 90-days amnesty to all illegal miners to legalise operations. It also setup and opened a Cadastre Department and announced that the issuance of mining licenses will be restricted to five per applicant.

== History ==
Indigenous people in what is now Zambia mined surface deposits for copper long before colonisation, They fashioned the metal into ingots for hand tools, weapons, and as a medium of exchange. Industrial copper production began in the Copperbelt near Solwezi in 1908. Foreign investment, mostly from the United States and South Africa drove major expansion in the copper industry between 1924 and 1969. Mining increased GDP, and by 1969 Zambia had one of the largest economies in Africa.

Between 1925 and 1975, Kabwe mine was the largest lead mine in Africa. The mine was shut down in 1994, leaving a legacy of toxic waste. Kabwe may be the most polluted city in the world.

=== Nationalisation ===
After Zambian independence in 1964, the Zambian government began to collect mining royalties that had previously been paid to the British South Africa Company (BSA). This increased the cost of mining for companies who were themselves BSA shareholders and reduced investment in the industry. A series of reforms between 1968 and 1970 restructured the mining industry, and the government acquired 51% shares in the major mining companies Anglo American and Roan Selection Trust. In 1982, these companies were merged into the state mining company Zambia Consolidated Copper Mines (ZCCM). During this period, mining income did finance some development programs, especially in education. Mining continued to decline as copper prices decreased while increasingly deep and more complex ores raised production costs.

=== Re-privatisation ===
After the 1991 election of President Chiluba, the mining industry began to be privatised in a process overseen by the IMF and the World Bank. This process was completed in 2000. Privatisation and a subsequent surge in world copper prices encouraged new foreign investment. Local communities have seen few development benefits during this period, leading to a series of protests and strikes in the industry.

Studies of the re-privatisation process have highlighted that the restructuring of Zambia Consolidated Copper Mines (ZCCM) substantially reduced direct state ownership. Investment agreements concluded in the late 1990s often provided private operators with favourable fiscal terms, which helped attract foreign investment but constrained the government’s ability to capture mineral rents and influence downstream development.

=== Energy transition and value addition ===
In more recent times, especially since the early 2020s, the Zambian government has together with the Democratic Republic of the Congo (DRC) increasingly linked its policies for development of the mining sector to the global energy transition, reflecting the two countries' role as major producers of cobalt and copper used in lithium-ion batteries and electric vehicles. Government policies have emphasised ambitions to move beyond mineral extraction towards greater value addition. Zambia has, together with the DRC, promoted the development of a cross-border battery and electric vehicle value chain centred on the Central African Copperbelt, the mineral-rich cross-border region between Zambia and the DRC. This initiative includes plans for regional mineral processing and industrial zones. In 2024, a pre-feasibility study for a transboundary battery and electric vehicle special economic zone involving both countries was reviewed by regional and international partners.

== Production ==
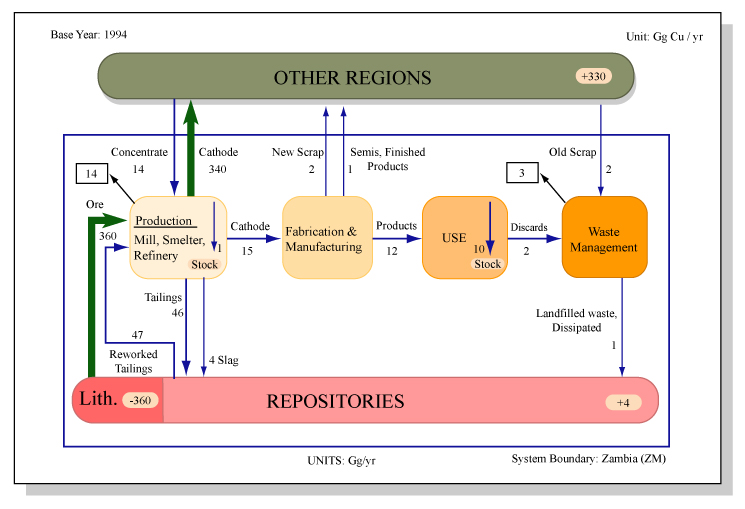
Zambia’s Copper Cycle: One Year Stocks and Flows, 1994.

Zambia produces copper, cobalt, gold, nickel, manganese, emeralds, beryllium, myriad gemstones, sulfur, zinc, coal, iron ore, steel, limestone, uranium and other platinum-group metals.

In 2022, Zambia produced 763,287 metric tons of copper. This was a 5% decrease from 800,696 tons in 2021.

Konkola Copper Mines (KCM) is the largest copper producing company in the country, producing two million tons of copper ore per year. The company operates Konkola Copper Mine and Nchanga Copper mine near Chingola. It also has the largest copper refinery in the country: Nkana Refinery in Kitwe.

Mopani Copper Mines is owned by state mining company ZCCM-IH, and has operations at Mufulira and Nkana. Nkana has been in operation since 1931 and Mufulira, which has been in operation since 1933 lies 50 kilometres (31 mi) north of Kitwe. The company also produces cobalt.

== Legal structure ==
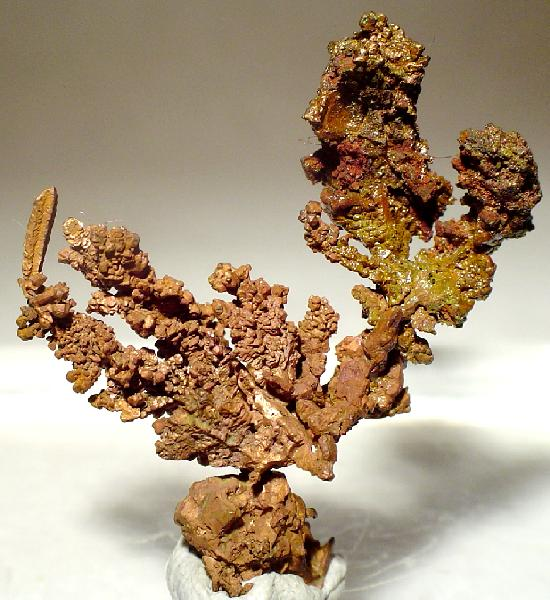
Copper is a major export of Zambia.

The Mines and Minerals Development Act No. 11 of 2015 defines the legal framework for Zambia's mining industry and sets rules for mining rights, mine safety, taxation, and environmental responsibilities.

Research by the Overseas Development Institute on the taxes and fees in the Zambian mining sector during privatisation in the late 1990s and the subsequent boom in copper prices reviewed the taxes and fees for mining and compared it internationally for royalties and corporate income tax in other major mining countries. There were significant differences between countries in how these taxes are calculated and as a result, a comparison of 'headline rates' on their own provide limited insight into how would-be investors perceive the mining sector.

They argued that perceptions offer an alternative and complementary approach to examine how Zambia compares from investors perspective to other countries. Using the Fraser Index component covering taxes and fees specifically, Zambia is in the middle of African countries, on par with South Africa, worse than Botswana, but better than the DRC. Perceptions that the taxes and fees for mining in Zambia are attractive does not necessarily mean the fiscal rates are themselves attractive (and vice versa) as investors tend to view taxes and fees in a broader context of risks to existing framework including its historical volatility and expectations regarding future changes, the possibility of negotiating a deal which is 'better' than the 'official' headline rates through exemptions or allowances, and other factors shaping the economics of the project for example if the geology is very favourable and extraction is low-cost, a firm will be able to accept a higher tax rate.

They claim the diversity of 'drivers' behind investment illustrates the challenges of talking about the 'competitiveness' of a sector's taxes and fees in a narrow sense and different companies will weigh the above factors differently depending on access to low-cost import markets, further complicating an assessment of what an 'average' investor would consider attractive. Government and its development partners have a role to play in promoting policies that make investment more attractive, such as increasing the predictability of the taxes and fees whilst reducing the costs of mining, from infrastructure to skills and quality of geodata.

They found Zambia is collecting and managing revenues from the mining sector, and that Extractive Industries Transparency Initiative has brought welcome transparency to the sector, but has limited scope. Debates have been less about whether revenue is going missing from companies to government, but more on whether Zambia is collecting what it is due. The main challenges therefore are for Zambia lie in reducing the complexity and opacity of mining sector fiscal framework, whilst boosting capacity of government agencies to monitor and collect fiscal contributions from the sector. Addressing these challenges can serve as a win-win for government, industry and development partners, by increasing taxes collected and satisfying those who are calling for greater contributions from the mining sector without further changes to an already-volatile taxes and fees.

They call for a better understanding and an open discussion between the government and mining sector, into what the sector's broader contribution is and what its needs are, to create the space for planning, education, infrastructure beyond the taxes and fees that explicitly take into account the mining sector.

== Environmental issues ==
The Broken Hill Mine, which occupies a 2.5 km^{2} site just 1 km south-west of Kabwe town centre, is now closed. Metals are still foraged from old tailings by locals. A study by the Blacksmith Institute found Kabwe to be one of the ten worst polluted and deadliest places in the world due mostly to heavy metal (mostly zinc, cadmium and lead) tailings making their way into local soil and the water supply.

== See also ==
- Mineral industry of Africa
- Economy of Zambia
- List of mines in Zambia
- List of companies of Zambia
