= Mufulira =

Town in Zambia

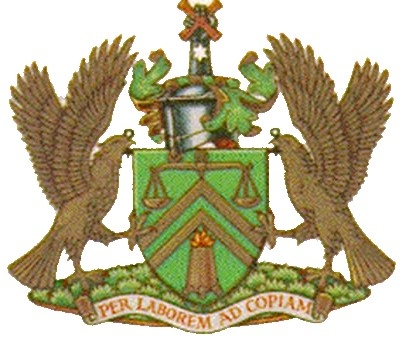
- Seal

- Location in Zambia
- Coordinates: 12°32′08″S 28°14′31″E
- Country: Zambia
- Province: Copperbelt
- District: Mufulira District
- Elevation: 4,180 ft (1,270 m)

Population (2010)
  - Total: 151,309
- Time zone: UTC+2 (CAT)
- Climate: Cwa

Mufulira is a town in the Copperbelt Province of Zambia. Mufulira means "Place of Abundance and Peace". The town developed around the Mufulira Copper Mine in the 1930s. The town also serves as the administrative capital of Mufulira District.

== Geography ==
=== Location ===
Mufulira is located approximately 19 kilometres (12 mi) southwest of the town of Mokambo, at the international border with the Democratic Republic of the Congo. The M4 road connects Mufulira to Kitwe, 43 kilometres (27 mi) to the south-west. The M4 also connects Mufulira to Ndola, the seat Copperbelt, 70 kilometres (43 mi) to the south-east.

Mufulira is connected to the Mokambo Border and eventually the Luapula Province of Zambia by the Congo Pedicle road. The section from Mufulira to Mokambo is designated as the M5 road while the route through the Congo Pedicle to the Chembe Border is named the Congo Pedicle road.

The geographical coordinates of Mufulira are:12°32'08.0"S, 28°14'31.0"E (Latitude:-12.535556; Longitude:28.241944). Mufulira sits at an average elevation of 4,180 feet (1,274 m) above mean sea level.

== Overview ==
The town of Mufulira developed around the Mufulira Copper Mine in the 1930s. A branch of Zambia Railways, carrying freight only, serves the mine. Mufulira is the south-western end of the Congo Pedicle road connecting the Copperbelt Province to the Luapula Province, making that province Mufulira's commercial hinterland.

== Population ==
In 1990, the population of Mufulira was 123,936 people. In 2000, there were 122,336 people. The 2010 population census and household survey enumerated the population of the town at 151,309 inhabitants. The table below illustrates the same data in tabular format.

Year	Population
1990	123,936
2000	122,336
2010	151,309

== Economy ==
The Mufulira Mine is now owned and operated by Mopani Copper Mines, which employs 10,000 permanent workers and produced about 300,000 tonnes (330,693 tons) of copper bars in 2007. The Mufulira Copper Smelter was rehabilitated by SMEC South Africa. Production and employment levels went down from the 1969 peak when the Copperbelt made Zambia the world's 4th largest copper producer.

== Sports ==
In Zambia, Mufulira is well known for being the home of Mufulira Wanderers F.C., a professional soccer club.

== Notable people ==
- Abe Bekker, boxer, lived here
- Kalusha Bwalya, national soccer player and African Footballer of the Year winner, in 1988, was born here.
- Frederick Jacob Titus Chiluba (1943–2011), who served as the second president of Zambia, from 1991 until 2001, lived in Mufulira in the 1960s.
- Robert Earnshaw, soccer player
- Mike Harris, racing driver who competed in the 1962 South African Grand Prix.
- Dafydd James, international rugby player
- Simon Mwansa Kapwepwe (1922–1980), who served as Vice President of Zambia from 1967 until 1970. He served as member of parliament for Mufulira West Constituency from December 1971 until February 1972, under the UPP political party, the only UPP MP elected.
- Christopher Katongo, soccer player
- Felix Katongo, soccer player
- Kenneth Kaunda (born 1924), the founder President of Zambia, in office from 1964 until 1991. In 1948, he served as a teacher and boarding master at Mufulira Upper School.
- Robert John "Mutt" Lange, songwriter and record producer
- Levy Patrick Mwanawasa (1948–2008), who served as President of Zambia from 2001 until 2008, was born in Mufulira.
- Samuel "Zoom" Ndhlovu, soccer player and Zambia Soccer Team coach
- Stevie Vann, singer
- Kåre Becker, professional footballer

== See also ==
- Mopani Copper Mines
- Copperbelt Province including the history of copper mining in Zambia
