= Kåre Becker =

Dutch footballer (born 1978)

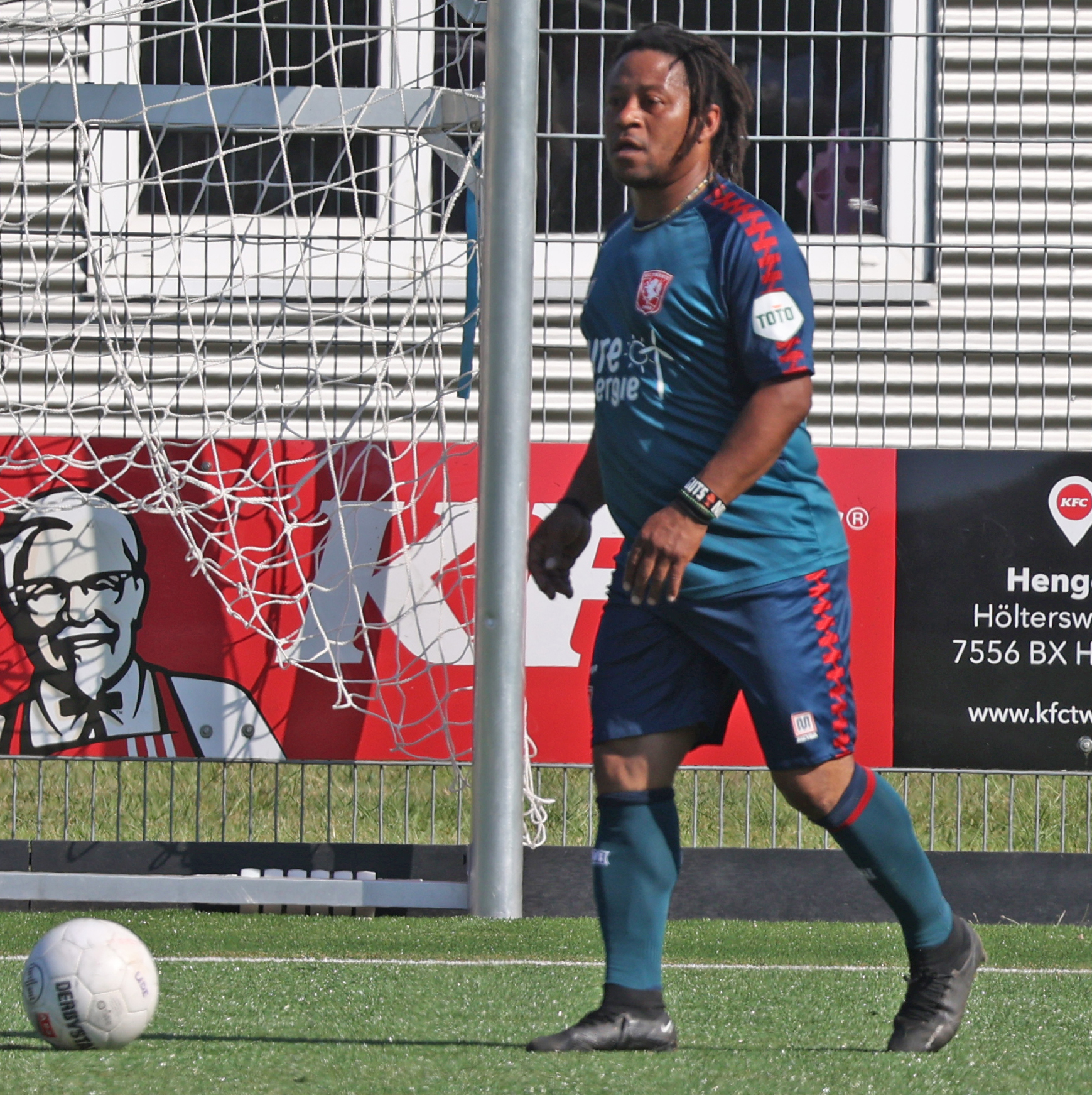

Personal information
- Date of birth: 27 January 1978 (age 48)
- Place of birth: Mufulira, Zambia
- Height: 1.82 m (6 ft 0 in)
- Position: Forward

Youth career
- Vitesse Delft
- Delfia
- Feyenoord
- De Graafschap

Senior career*
Years	Team	Apps	(Gls)
–2001	FC Twente	1	(0)
2000–2001	→ Heracles (loan)	25	(4)
2001–2002	PEC Zwolle	18	(1)
2002–2004	Sportclub Enschede		
2004–2005	Eintracht Nordhorn		
2005-2009	De Tubanters 1897		
- * Club domestic league appearances and goals

Kåre Becker (born 27 January 1978) is a Zambia-born Dutch retired footballer who played as a forward.

== Career ==
Born in Zambia to a Malawian father and Zimbabwean mother, Becker moved to the Netherlands at the age of 5 after living in Northern Ireland and Norway.

In 2000, Becker was loaned to Heracles Almelo in the Dutch second division. At the end of the 2000–01 season, when asked what he wanted to earn during new contract negotiations, he asked for time to think. Two days later, however, the local newspaper declared that the contract renewal was "halted due to excessive salary requirements".

In 2001, Becker signed for another second division side, PEC Zwolle. However, during the season, manager Paul Krabbe was replaced by Peter Boeve, who treated him poorly and even assigned him a different locker room. As a result, he left at the end of 2001–02.

For 2004–05, Becker signed for Eintracht Nordhorn in the German fourth division, but did not play well having "greatly underestimated German football".

== Personal life ==
His son Kaid Phiri Becker plays in the Go Ahead Eagles academy.
