= Chembe District =

Coordinates: 10°25′S 29°00′E

- District
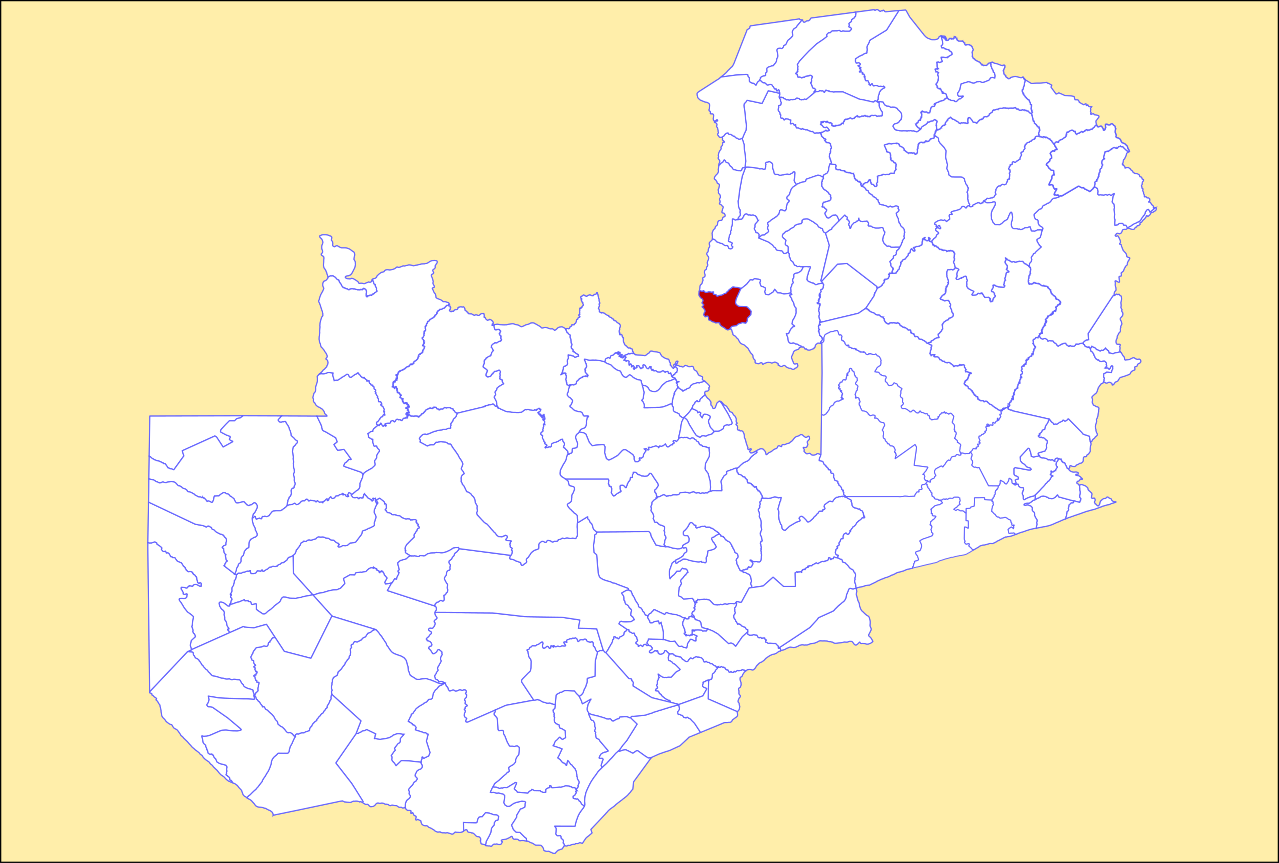
- District location in Zambia
- Country: Zambia
- Province: Luapula Province

Area
  - Total: 2,190.4 km^{2} (845.7 sq mi)

Population (2022)
  - Total: 51,532
  - Density: 23.526/km^{2} (60.933/sq mi)
- Time zone: UTC+2 (CAT)

Chembe District is a district of Zambia, located in Luapula Province. The capital lies at Chembe. It was created in 2012 by splitting Mansa District. As of the 2022 Zambian Census, the district had a population of 51,532 people.
