= Congo Pedicle road =

Road in DR Congo

Congo Pedicle Road
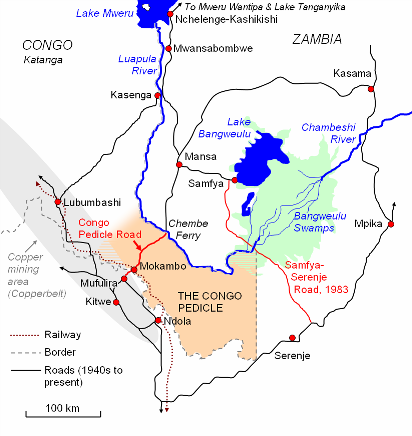
- Map showing the Congo Pedicle road, the direct route from Mufulira to Mansa, and the alternative route via Serenje, Mpika and Kasama, or, from 1983, Serenje and Samfya

Location
- Country: Zambia

Highway system
- Transport in Zambia

The Congo Pedicle road (at one time referred to as the 'Zaire Pedicle road') crosses the Congolese territory of the Congo Pedicle and was constructed by and is maintained by Zambia to connect its Copperbelt and Luapula Provinces. Both the road and the territory may be referred to as ‘the Pedicle’. It is designated as the N36 Route on the Congolese Road Network.

It connects the M3 road at Chembe, Luapula Province with the M5 road at Mufulira, Copperbelt Province via Mokambo. For thirty years, the Congo Pedicle road has been a major development issue in northern Zambia.

== The need for a crossing of the Pedicle ==
From its inception, the Pedicle, then in the Congo Free State, was crossed by those travelling between the Luapula, Mweru and Bangweulu areas and the south, especially after Rhodesia Railways constructed the railway to Ndola in 1906. But there were other routes. In the 19th century the more travelled trade route from those areas had been to the south end of Lake Tanganyika, by boat up the lake to Ujiji, overland to Dar es Salaam, and by boat to Zanzibar. Completion of the Dar es Salaam railway to Kigoma, near Ujiji, in German East Africa in 1914, coupled with a lake steamer service to Mpulungu near Abercorn, made it even more viable.

=== The Copperbelt ===
Development of the Copperbelt from the late 1920s had a big impact on overland routes. Copperbelt towns including Élisabethville (now 'Lubumbashi') in the province of Katanga in the Belgian Congo became the markets and chief source of supplies and employment for the Luapula-Mweru-Bangweulu region, and in turn their large fisheries (the largest in Northern Rhodesia) supplied the growing Copperbelt labour force.

=== The Katanga route ===
However, it was Élisabethville and Katanga which benefited initially, via a road to the Congolese port of Kasenga on the Luapula, and another to a ferry at Shiniama across the Luapula near Matanda and on to Fort Rosebery (now known as Mansa). There was migration from Luapula Province to Katanga, and some of Mwata Kazembe's people looked to Élisabethville for employment and advancement rather than Mufulira, Kitwe and Ndola. The Northern Rhodesian authorities and mines were slower to catch on, and when dried fish was bought for their workforce from Katanga, it may well have been caught in the Northern Rhodesian waters of Lake Mweru, Lake Mweru Wantipa, south-west Lake Tanganyika or even Lake Bangweulu. There was a road from Ndola across the border to Sakania in the Belgian Congo, and a dirt road to a small ferry over the Luapula at Kapalala, but it was not a direct route, took at least a day to travel, and was not suitable for the heavier vehicles. Eventually, in the late 1940s, the Government of Northern Rhodesia realised the need for a larger, direct road from the Copperbelt to Fort Rosebery with a higher-capacity ferry over the Luapula.

== Construction of the Congo Pedicle ==
Negotiations with the Belgian colonial authorities in the Belgian Congo produced an agreement for Northern Rhodesia to build and maintain a 70 km (43 mi) graded laterite road from Mokambo, which is 16 km (10 mi) from the Copperbelt town of Mufulira, to Chembe. Although only used by Northern Rhodesia and with no Congolese settlements except Mokambo on its route, it had border control posts at both ends and traffic drove on the right. By the 1950s the Chembe Ferry had two motorised pontoons able to take the largest trucks, the border posts worked smoothly and the 174 km (108 mi) drive from Mufulira to Mansa could be completed in four or five hours. By comparison the same journey keeping to roads within the country was 1,166 km (725 mi) and took at least two days, going via Kapiri Mposhi, Mpika, Kasama and Luwingu.

In the past four decades the superiority of the Katangan roads has reversed, with the Lubumbashi-Kasenga road deteriorating to the extent that it may take several days to reach Kasenga. Congolese travellers and goods frequently cross into the Zambian Copperbelt from Lubumbashi and take the Pedicle or the Samfya-Serenje road to Kasenga.

== Problems emerge ==
=== The Congo crisis ===
Apart from the Luapula occasionally bursting its banks at Chembe in the rainy season and halting the Chembe Ferry for a few days, this happy state of affairs continued until the Congo Crisis of 1961 when travel on the pedicle stopped for security reasons and had to be routed by air or via Kasama. Although the interruption did not last long, it highlighted the vulnerability of the route.

=== Independence ===
The Belgian Congo became independent in June 1960 as the Republic of the Congo and changed its name to Zaire in 1971, and Northern Rhodesia became independent in October 1964, as Zambia. Any thought that two African neighbours with shared tribal, cultural and historical origins could cooperate even better than neighbouring colonial powers was dispelled not long after. The colonial experience had broken down those connections which might have smoothed travel by Zambians through Zaire and replaced them with a bureaucracy and leadership whose allegiances had greatly changed and who saw how to exploit regulations and authority for their own gains.

=== Harassment of travelers ===
Under Mobutu, governance deteriorated and corruption flourished in Zaire, and he saw Katanga only as a cash cow and punished it for its separatist tendencies by neglecting its development. Zairean border officials and police went for months without being paid and turned to petty corruption to survive. At first small bribes were taken from Zambians whose identity cards were not in order, but this escalated to arbitrary fines, for example, a driver might be fined for wearing a hat while his passenger was fined for not wearing a hat.

The Pedicle became the major gripe for the people of Luapula Province and they assailed their leaders and officials when they toured the province, such as in a meeting of civil servants in Mansa in 1975 with President Kenneth Kaunda, when most of the questions were about harassment at the Pedicle.

The situation became more severe when any of Mobutu's security forces were in the Pedicle, with robberies, violence and occasionally the complete disappearance of travellers and their vehicles.

=== Developing alternative routes ===
The route by-passing the Pedicle is made longer by Lake Bangweulu and its swamps which extend from its north-east tip for 200 km (120 mi) to the north, and the only route had to go east then north of this system. A route south of the lake was hampered by the fact that the Luapula and its swamps there are at least 6 km (3.7 mi) wide, and the floodplain is 60 km (37 mi) wide. However the complaints about the Pedicle were so many that the tarred 300 km (190 mi) Samfya-Serenje road and Mukuku Bridge, which is 2.5 km (1.6 mi) long with nearly 20 km (12 mi) of causeway, one of the biggest infrastructure projects in the country, were constructed and opened in 1983. The Mufulira-Mansa distance by this route is 718 km (446 mi), still much longer than the Pedicle route but saving 448 km (278 mi) on the Kasama route.

== The future of the Pedicle Road ==
In the meantime, the laterite Pedicle road has deteriorated but security in the Democratic Republic of the Congo has improved. As the cost of fuel has soared and with the Pedicle saving more than 300 km (200 mi) on the Copperbelt-Serenje-Samfya-Mansa distance there is still the need to pave the Pedicle. Construction of the Chembe Bridge (also known as the Mwanawasa Bridge) started in 2007 and was completed in October 2008, commissioned by President Levy Mwanawasa. As of February 2016, the Pedicle Road is halfway tarred. Work is continuing in the area.
