= Chipulukusu =

Neighbourhood of Ndola, Zambia

- Neighbourhood
- Location in Zambia
- Coordinates: 12°55′56″S 28°39′21″E
- Country: Zambia
- Province: Copperbelt
- District: Ndola District
- Main Place: Ndola

Chipulukusu is an informal settlement and a neighbourhood of Ndola, Zambia (east of the city centre). It is separated from the Ndola city centre by the Zambian railway line.
