= Mansa, Zambia =

Town in Luapula, Zambia

Mansa
- Town
- Location in Zambia
- Coordinates: 11°12′00″S 28°53′00″E
- Country: Zambia
- Province: Luapula
- District: Mansa District
- Elevation: 3,900 ft (1,190 m)

Population (2022)
  - Total: 327,063
- Postal codes: Kasama town and other areas districts of northern province use the 410 postcode
- Climate: Cwa

Mansa is the capital of the Luapula Province of Zambia, and headquarters of Mansa District. It takes its name from the local Chief Mansa and the small Mansa River which flows west to the Luapula River. During British rule the city was named Fort Rosebery.

== Situation and character ==
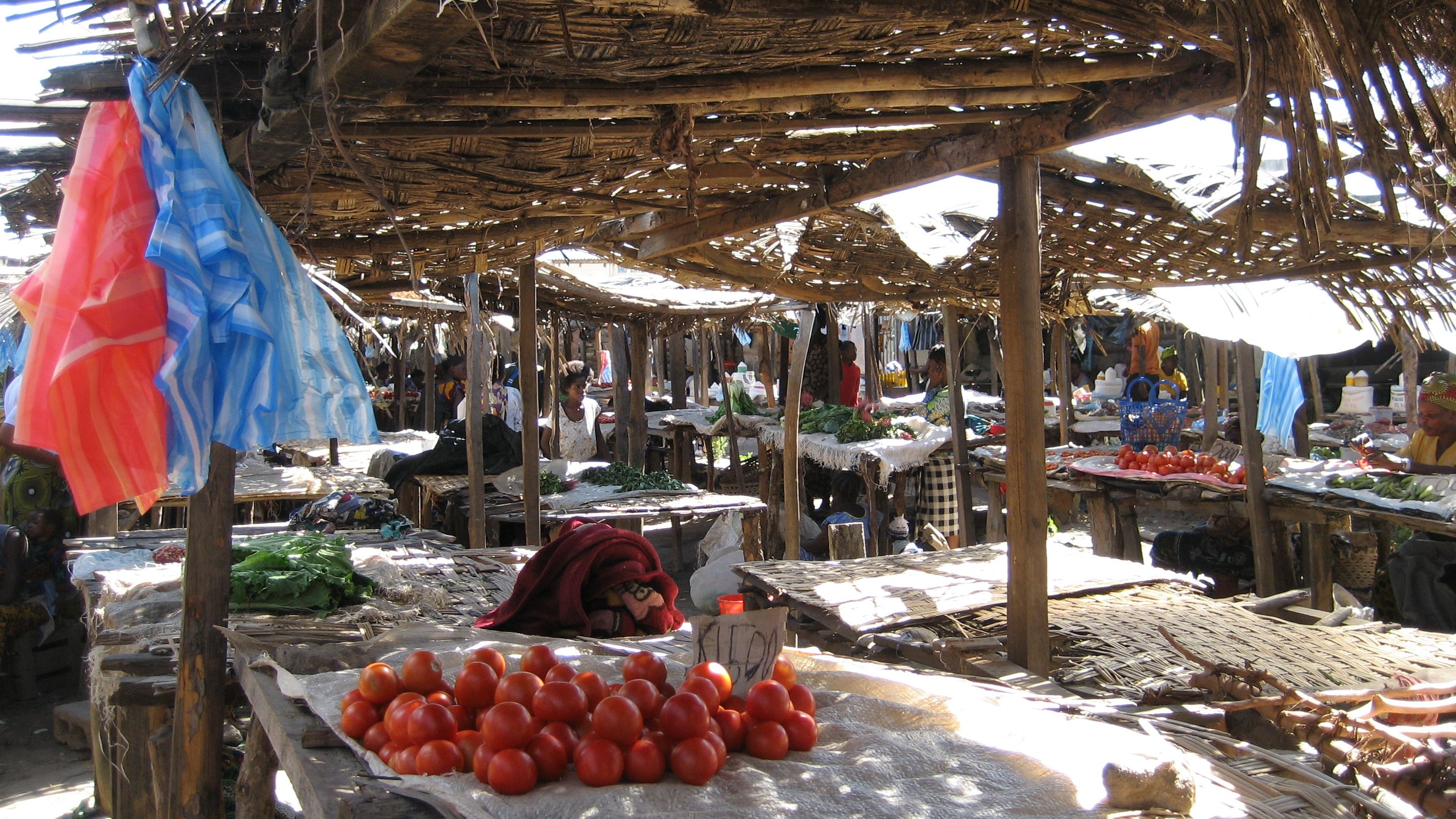
Market in Mansa

In a province of rivers, waterfalls, lakes and wetlands, Mansa serves administrative and commercial functions, being situated on a relatively featureless plateau between the Luapula River to the west and Lake Bangweulu to the east. It is connected to the Congo Pedicle road (and eventually the Copperbelt Province) in the south and to Luwingu and Kasama in the north-east by the M3 road. It is also connected to Kawambwa in the north by the M13 road. It is also connected to Samfya in the east by the D94 road. It is also connected to Mwense in the north by the D81 road.

== Origins ==
In colonial times Mansa was called Fort Rosebery, named for Lord Rosebery, who was Prime Minister of the United Kingdom from 5 March 1894 to 22 June 1895. The town was also the capital of the province. The first Fort Rosebery, however was situated in the Luapula Valley around 1900, where most of the province's population live, near Mambilima. After an outbreak of sleeping sickness in the valley some years later it was moved to the present site in the belief that the higher plateau site would be more healthy.

The Luapula Province developed in the mid-20th century on the supply of fish, agricultural produce and labour to Zambia's industrial centre, the Copperbelt, and Mansa developed with it as an administrative and distribution centre.

== Recent history ==
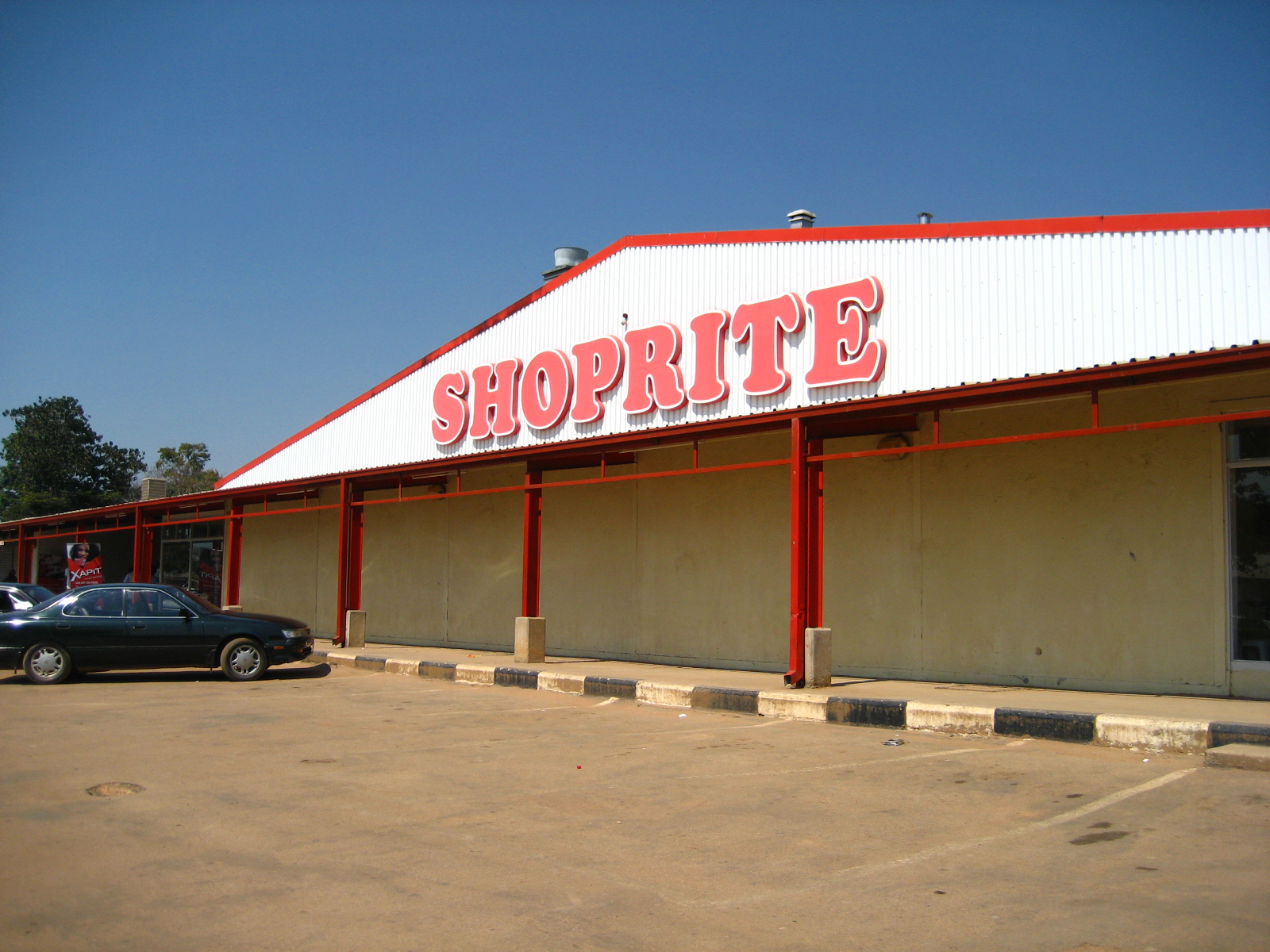
Shoprite in Mansa

Over the last twenty years the town has grown considerably in population but not in prosperity since a decrease in employment in the mines of the Copperbelt forced a return to the land in areas such as the Luapula Province. Mansa lacks industries since the battery factory closed in 1994, and in the absence of employment opportunities, chitemene (a form of subsistence farming) has degraded the surrounding woodlands appreciably. Nevertheless, as a commercial hub serving the whole province, the town is home to a daily market, banks, warehouses, a number of large stores and dealers, and a Shoprite supermarket.

== Climate ==
Mansa features a humid subtropical climate (Köppen: Cwa) with clear wet and dry seasons. October and November are the hottest months, while winters are milder, with July being the coolest month. The wet season, from November to March, experiences significant rainfall, whereas the dry season, from May to October, is marked by minimal precipitation.

Climate data for Mansa
Month	Jan	Feb	Mar	Apr	May	Jun	Jul	Aug	Sep	Oct	Nov	Dec	Year
Record high °C (°F)	34.0 (93.2)	32.7 (90.9)	32.0 (89.6)	31.8 (89.2)	31.9 (89.4)	30.8 (87.4)	35.6 (96.1)	33.5 (92.3)	36.5 (97.7)	38.9 (102.0)	36.5 (97.7)	33.5 (92.3)	38.9 (102.0)
Mean daily maximum °C (°F)	27.1 (80.8)	27.3 (81.1)	27.4 (81.3)	27.3 (81.1)	26.7 (80.1)	25.2 (77.4)	25.2 (77.4)	27.3 (81.1)	30.4 (86.7)	31.2 (88.2)	29.2 (84.6)	27.1 (80.8)	27.6 (81.7)
Daily mean °C (°F)	20.8 (69.4)	20.9 (69.6)	20.9 (69.6)	20.6 (69.1)	18.8 (65.8)	16.5 (61.7)	16.6 (61.9)	18.6 (65.5)	21.8 (71.2)	23.2 (73.8)	22.2 (72.0)	20.8 (69.4)	20.1 (68.2)
Mean daily minimum °C (°F)	16.8 (62.2)	16.8 (62.2)	16.6 (61.9)	15.4 (59.7)	12.3 (54.1)	9.1 (48.4)	8.6 (47.5)	10.4 (50.7)	13.5 (56.3)	16.1 (61.0)	16.9 (62.4)	16.8 (62.2)	14.1 (57.4)
Record low °C (°F)	14.0 (57.2)	13.9 (57.0)	12.1 (53.8)	9.5 (49.1)	6.5 (43.7)	4.1 (39.4)	3.0 (37.4)	4.5 (40.1)	7.2 (45.0)	10.5 (50.9)	12.6 (54.7)	13.9 (57.0)	3.0 (37.4)
Average precipitation mm (inches)	242.3 (9.54)	219.2 (8.63)	199.1 (7.84)	61.1 (2.41)	6.6 (0.26)	0.1 (0.00)	0.0 (0.0)	0.1 (0.00)	4.2 (0.17)	41.2 (1.62)	143.1 (5.63)	259.6 (10.22)	1,176.6 (46.32)
Average precipitation days (≥ 1.0 mm)	22	18	17	7	1	0	0	0	0	4	15	22	106
Average relative humidity (%)	79.5	79.4	77.4	73.4	66.3	60.9	58.1	52.4	46.1	48.0	61.9	76.0	65.0
Mean monthly sunshine hours	145.7	134.4	179.8	213.0	260.4	258.0	275.9	294.5	270.0	251.1	198.0	142.6	2,623.4
Source: NOAA

== Proximity to the Congo ==
Although only 50 km east from the Democratic Republic of the Congo, and cut off from the Copperbelt by the Congo Pedicle, Mansa does not have direct trade links to that country. Wars and frequent conflict in the Congo over the past fifty years have frequently hindered the development of Mansa. The Luapula which forms the border is crossed by a passenger ferry to the north-west at Kasenga, and by a bridge to the south at Chembe, but this connects through Congolese territory via Zambia's notorious and frequently impassable Congo Pedicle road only to the Copperbelt. Other roads on the Congolese side are severely degraded, consequently some Congolese trade passes on Zambian roads through Mansa, such as the output of the Dikulushi Copper Mine west of Lake Mweru. Otherwise, trade with the Congo is restricted to local produce and smuggling across the river.

== Transport ==
Mansa Airport (IATA: MNS) is a paved airstrip servicing Mansa twice a week by Proflight Zambia. Public transport is restricted to buses traveling between towns on the main highways listed above. With peace in the Congo, a bridge named after the late President Levy Patrick Mwanawasa was constructed across the Luapula River at Chembe to by-pass the Chembe ferry. Currently the Congo Pedicle Road is being tarred to improve Mansa's access to the Copperbelt, and may also increase trade between Kasama and the Copperbelt.

The road to the Mwanawasa Bridge at Chembe (and eventually the Congo Pedicle road) in the south and to Luwingu and Kasama in the north-east is designated as the M3 road. The road to the resort town of Samfya (and eventually the Luapula Bridge to Central Province) in the east is designated as the D94 road.

== Attractions ==
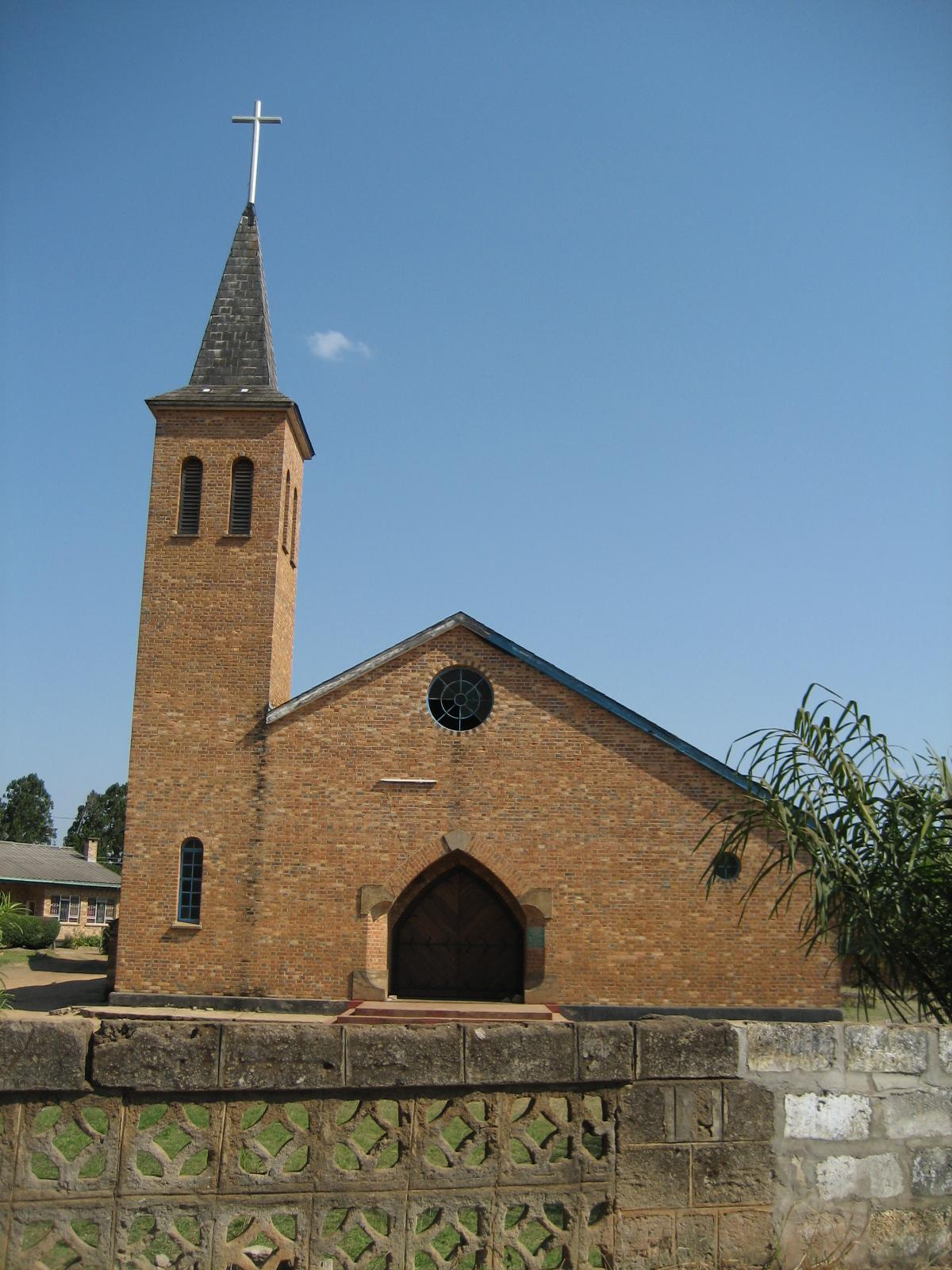
Mansa Catholic Cathedral

- Mansa Catholic Cathedral
- Mansa Hotel
- Mansa Teacher Training College
- Mumbuluma Falls
- Mansa School of Nursing
- Mansa Trades Training Institute (M.T.T.I)

== PLARD I and II ==
- Program for Luapula Agriculture and Rural Development-Phase I (PLARD I) (2007-2011)
  - The programme was based at the ZARI (agricultural research station), Mansa, 5 km outside Mansa and managed by a Programme Management Unit (PMU). The PMU was managed by a Finnish Consultancy with main offices being located at the research station. PLARD I was a programme run in collaboration with the Ministry of Agriculture and Cooperatives and the Government of Finland.
- Program for Luapula Agriculture and Rural Development-Phase II (PLARD II) (2011-2015).
  - The aim of PLARD II is to help increase income and food security for the people of Luapula Province by improving the institutional capacity of MAL at the provincial and district levels. It is implemented by the Ministry of Agriculture and Livestock (MAL) with technical support from a small Programme Support Unit (PSU) located close to the MAL Provincial Offices. The programme is jointly funded by the Government of Zambia and Government of Finland.
  - The province covers more than 50,000 km2 and has a population approaching one million people. MAL provincial and district structures implement the programme in the seven original districts of Luapula (four additional districts were created in 2012) working in 87 out of 179 agricultural camps, and 137 VFMCs.
  - PLARD II overall objective is: To achieve an efficient, competitive and sustainable agricultural and fisheries sector, ensuring increased income and food security for the people of Luapula Province.
  - The programme has five components plus a crosscutting issues component: 1. Agribusiness, 2. Agriculture, 3. Capture Fisheries, 4. Livestock and Aquaculture, 5. Institutional and Organisational Development of MAL at provincial and district levels, and 6. Crosscutting Objectives that focuses particularly on gender, HIV/AIDS, vulnerable groups and environment/climate change.
