= Mopani Copper Mines =

Mining company in Zambia

Mopani Copper Mines Plc
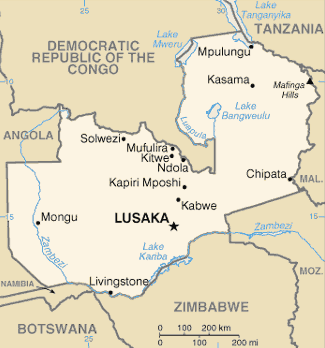
- Map of Zambia, with sites of Mufulira and Kitwe (upper center), near Nkana.
- Type: Public
- Industry: Mining, Materials
- Founded: 2000; 26 years ago
- Headquarters: Kitwe, Zambia
- Key people: Charles Sakanya (Chief Executive Officer)
- Products: Copper, Cobalt
- Owner: International Resources Holding (IRH); (51%, 2024-present); ZCCM Investment Holdings; (49%, 2024–present)
- Number of employees: 15,500 total
- Website: https://mopani.com.zm

Mopani Copper Mines PLC (also known as Mopani) is a Zambian company that produces and sells copper and cobalt to the international market, being one of the biggest mines and exporters in the world.

After being owned by ZCCM Investment Holdings since its founding, the company had a 51% stake sold to International Resources Holding (IRH) in March 2024.

== History ==
Mopani Copper Mines Plc was originally part of Zambia Consolidated Copper Mines Limited (ZCCM) and was state-owned until its privatisation in 2000. On 1 April 2000, Mopani purchased the ZCCM assets at Mufulira and Nkana, consisting of the underground mine, concentrator, smelter, refinery and cobalt plant, from the government.

Following privatisation the Zambian Government retained a stake in the mining industry through ZCCM Investments Holdings Plc (ZCCM-IH) which is an investments holdings company, quoted on the Lusaka, London, and Euronext stock exchanges. The majority of its investments are held in the copper mining sector of Zambia.

It was important to find a name that retained the acronym "MCM" after privatization, because MCM is the London Metal Exchange listed name for copper produced at Mufulira Refinery. Mufulira copper is considered amongst the purest copper in the world.

MCM produced 134,800 tonnes (148,600 short tons) of copper and 2,040 tonnes (2,250 short tons) of cobalt in 2003. At that time, MCM invested in a number of oxide copper projects at several of its properties, including an in-situ leaching project at Mufulira and leaching at Nkana, and has achieved significant production increases at its underground mining operations in Kitwe and Mufulira. Copper production from internal sources was supplemented by the purchase of some 18,000 tonnes (20,000 short tons) of copper in high-grade oxide concentrate bought from the Democratic Republic of the Congo, and 185,325 tonnes of copper concentrate toll treated from Copper-miner Equinox in 2007.

The company installed ISA smelt furnace, Matte Settling Electric Furnace, oxygen plant, at the Mufulira smelter during 2004 and 2005, at a total cost of US$213 million.

The Mopani Copper Mine has generated over $560 million in tax payments to the Zambian government since privatization in 2000 through royalties, import/customs duties and income taxes. However, the fraudulent dissimulation of thousands of millions of dollars by MCM is under investigation, and the President of the European Investment Bank (EIB) has instructed the services to decline any further financing request from this company or its subsidiaries.

In January 2021. the Zambian Government, through the ZCCM-IH, took on US$1.5 billion in debt to and acquired the 90% shares of Mopani Copper Mines Plc from Carlisa Investments Corporation and became the sole owner of Mopani Copper Mines Plc.

With a new government installed in August 2021, indications of a policy shift on ownership were floated with the leadership advising they intend to create an enabling environment that will attract both local and international investments.

In March 2022, the Canadian High Commissioner to Zambia Pamela O’Donnell, indicated that Canada, through Barrick Gold and First Quantum Minerals expressed interest to invest in the Mine. In July, ZCCM-Investment Holdings agreed to offer corporate guarantees of up to US$15.0 million to Atlas Mara Bank Zambia Limited to provide working capital to Mopani Copper Mines (MCM) to inject liquidity for its operations.

=== Corporate overview ===
Mopani Copper Mines was previously owned by Carlisa Investments Corporation (a joint venture company comprising Glencore International AG (73.1%) and First Quantum Minerals Ltd (16.9%)) and ZCCM-IH (10%). Minority shareholders are spread throughout the world, in various locations.

In February 2024, Zambia Consolidated Copper Mines-Investment Holdings (ZCCM-IH) approved the acquisition of a 51 percent stake worth 25.5 bn kwacha (US$ 1.1 bn) in Mopani Copper Mines Plc by Delta Mining Limited, a subsidiary of International Resource Holdings (IRH) that is headquartered in Abu Dhabi, United Arab Emirates. The transaction was completed the following month.

== Operations ==
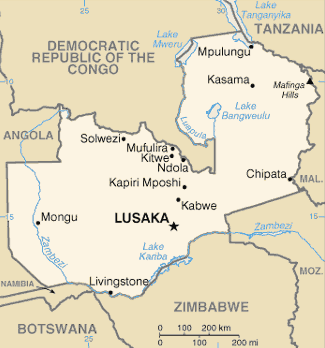
Map of Zambia, with sites of Mufulira and Kitwe (upper center), near Nkana.

The company has mine sites at Mufulira and Nkana, which are located on the Copperbelt in central Zambia. The head office is located in Kitwe near Nkana assets. Nkana has been in operation since 1931 and Mufulira, which has been in operation since 1933 lies 50 kilometres (31 mi) north of Kitwe.

The company operates the Mufulira mine, smelter, concentrator and copper refinery and the Nkana mine, concentrator and cobalt plant. The name "Mopani" was chosen by vote amongst employees after the local Mopani tree.

== Environmental and health impact ==
Serious concerns have been raised by local residents and activists about high levels of air and water pollution directly caused by the mining operations at the Mopani Copper Mine. In the award-winning documentary "Zambia: Good Copper, Bad Copper", by investigative journalists Audrey Gallet and Alice Odiot, the large impact of high emissions of sulfur dioxide and dust into the air and water pollution due to the mining operations is shown. In this documentary local residents complain of frequent breathing problems, chest pain and eye irritation due to exposure to the emissions.

A second serious form of pollution is due to leaks of sulfuric acid, used in the extraction of copper from the ore, into the drinking water. In the documentary a serious incident due to high levels of sulfuric acid in the drinking water in 2008 is reported, which caused numerous hospitalizations of local residents, among whom children. Local officials are seen testifying that measured concentrations of sulfur dioxide frequently reach levels many times higher than recommended values. It was reported that Zambian environment authorities temporarily closed part of the mining operation after health complaints from local residents in March 2012.

However, under investigation is the fraudulent dissimulation of thousands of million dollars by MCM, and the President of the EIB has instructed the services to decline any further financing request from this company or one of its subsidiaries.

== Mufulira Mine ==
Presently, the Mufulira Mine employs about 5,000 people directly. Assets include: a concentrator, a refinery and a smelter; and produces 35,000 tonnes of contained copper in ore each year through the process of open stoping. The copper is then taken to the concentrator.

There are three types of mining methods currently in use at Mufulira mine site. The first is the original drill and blast underground mining method (MCR – Mechanised Continuous Retreat or modified Sub Level Caving) used in Mufulira main, secondly Room and Pillar with waste rock backfill employed at Mufulira East Portal, and thirdly Insitu Leaching of old stopes.

=== Mufulira Concentrator ===
The Concentrator operates in a conventional manner, and has a capacity of 8,500 tonnes of ore per day. Primary stage crushing of ore is done underground while the secondary and tertiary stage crushing take place at the Concentrator. Ball mills grind the crushed ore for subsequent flotation to produce a copper concentrate grade of 40-43%. Concentrator recovery is approximately 94.5%.

=== Mufulira Smelter ===
The smelter smelts the copper concentrate mixed with silica in the Isasmelt furnace. The product from the ISA furnace is matte and slag which goes to the Matte Settling Electric Furnace. Slag is tapped out and discarded. Matte is tapped out and taken to the PS converters for further processing to blister copper. The blister copper is then further processed in Anode furnaces and, thereafter, the copper is cast into anodes in a twin casting wheel. The anodes are then sent to the refinery for electro-refining.

The Mufulira smelter was first built in 1937. Prior to privatization in 2000, 100% of all SO2 went into the atmosphere, and the latest information confirms that the situation has improved since, including notably through the investment financed by EIB's loan to Mopani copper mine for modernization of the copper smelter. The project has successfully established the capacity to eliminate 170,000 tonnes of sulfur dioxide a year, materially contributing to the protection of the environment. This improvement has been strongly contradicted by recent reports on the effects of pollution on local residents.

=== Mufulira Refinery (including agitation leach, heap leach, SX & EW plants) ===
In the refinery, copper anodes coming from the smelter are electro-refined to produce cathodes having 99.99% Cu and conforming to LME grade A. This is done by putting anodes and cathodes alternately in a cell, in which copper sulphate electrolyte solution is circulated and current is passed. Copper ions thus generated from anodes move towards cathode and get deposited on starter plates [cathodes]. The cathode plates are taken out from the cells at a certain interval. The cathodes thus produced are bundled and are mostly exported.

During electrolysis precious metals like gold, silver, platinum, selenium, palladium etc. settle down along with other impurities at the bottom of the cells. This is removed and collected at the end of anode cycle. This product known as anode slime is washed, dried packed and exported for recovering precious metals.

At the refinery there are also three SX plants and one electrowinning plant. PLS from the Agitation Leach, Mufulira West heap leach and In-Situ Leach operations are first treated at SX Plants and then taken to the electrowinning plant for the production of copper cathodes.

=== Mine Collapse ===
Overnight on 25 September 1970, the bottom of Tailings Pond #3 failed, causing approximately 1 million tons of tailings and mud to drain into the mine. This facility was positioned directly above the underground workings. 89 mine workers from the night shift were killed, and a sinkhole at the bottom of the drained pond remained, allowing surface water to continue to pour into the workings.

Two years prior to this, a series of sinkholes had started to develop within the #3 Tailings Pond as the result of underground hanging wall collapse, and two instances of mud ingress had been recorded.

Mopani Mine
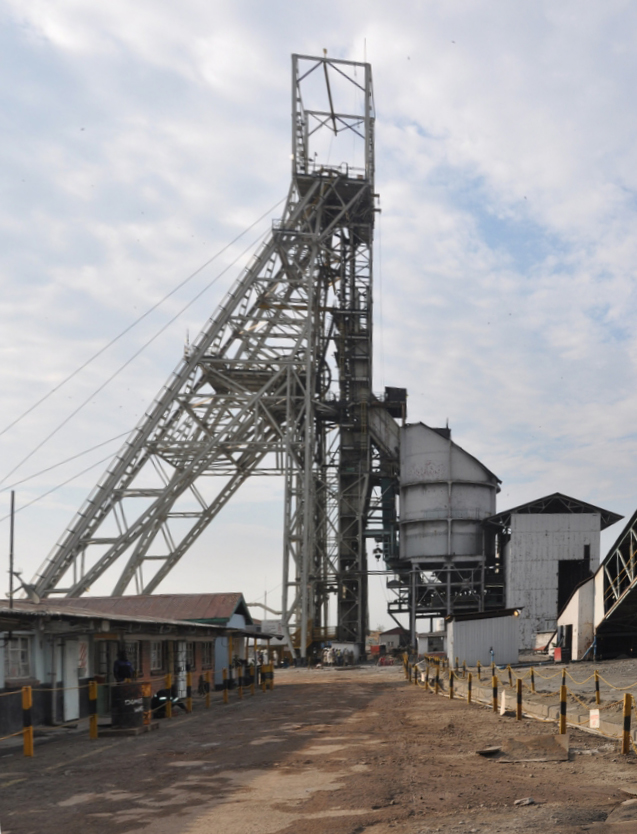
Mine head Gear - South ore Body at Nkana.

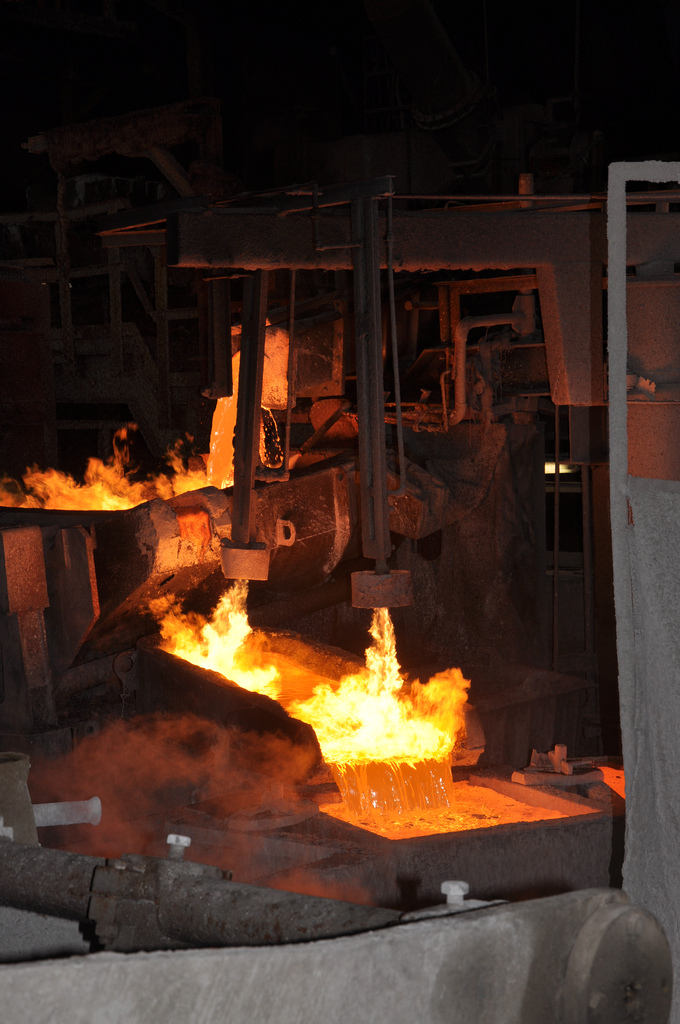
Molten copper being poured at Mufulira.

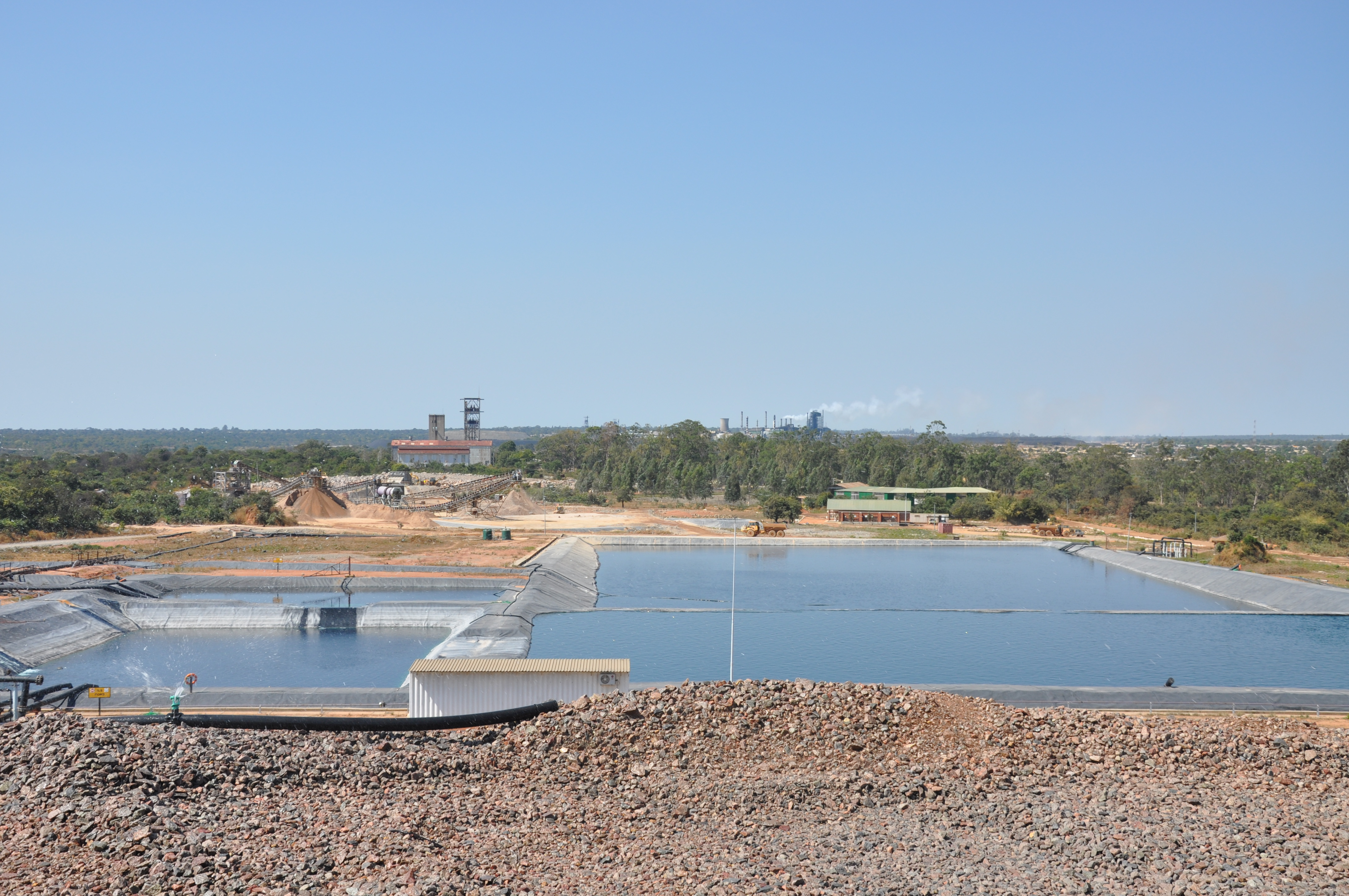
Leach Ponds - Mufilira.

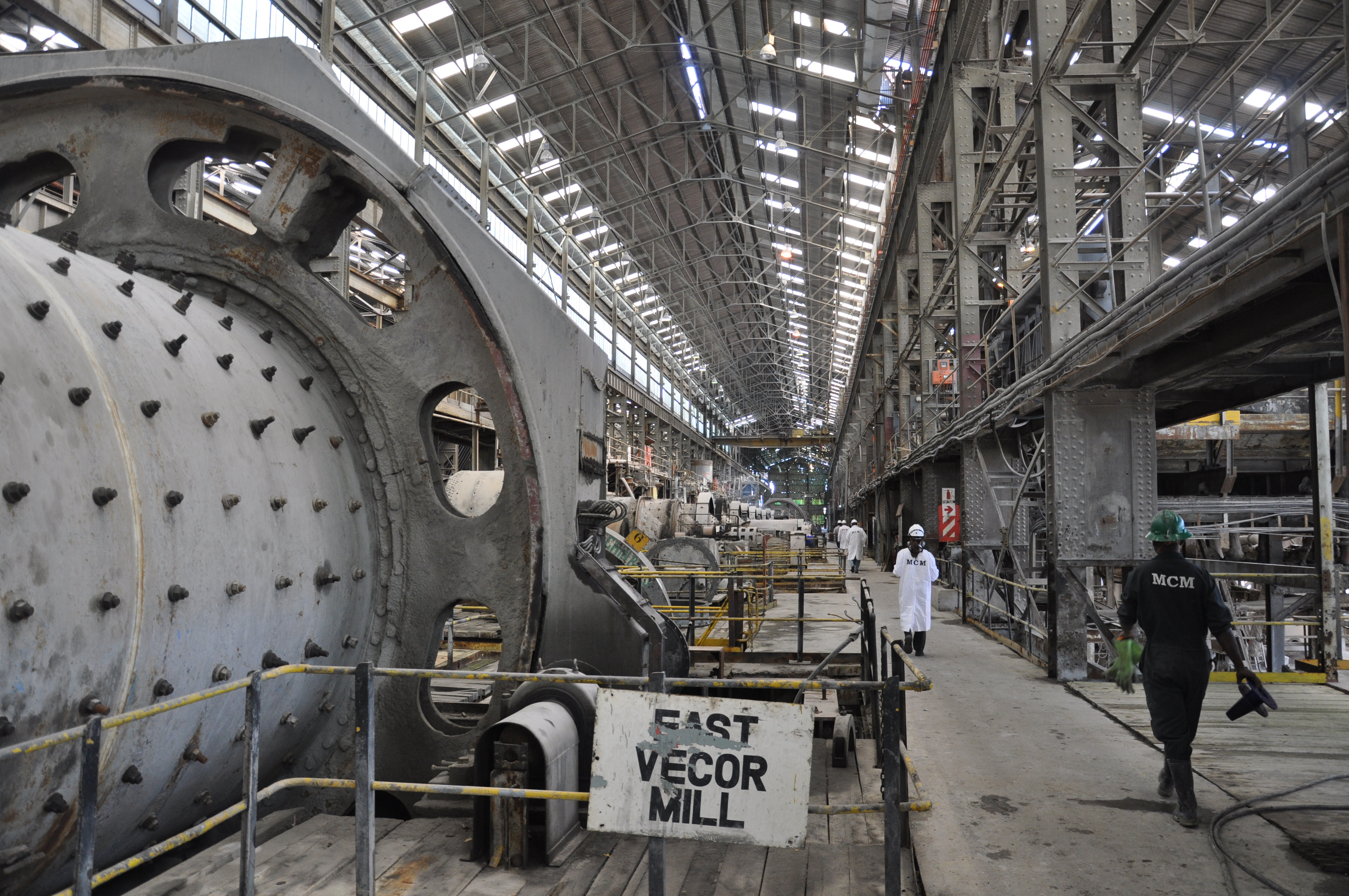
Milling Hall.

== Nkana Mine ==
Nkana mine is one of the largest in Africa, a copper mine located 1 km south-west of Kitwe.

At Nkana mine, copper and cobalt ore is produced from five sources: four underground mines, namely Mindola North Shaft, Mindola Sub Vertical Shaft, Central Shaft, and South Ore Body (SOB) Shaft; and open pits dotted across the Nkana Oxide Cap. Vertical crater retreat (VCR), both caving and post-fill, has been the predominant mining method utilised within the Nkana mine but is now being converted to a combination of sub-level caving (SLC) and open stoping techniques.

Vertical shafts from the surface provide access to each of the four underground mines. In addition, in the deeper sections of the Mindola mine and Central Shaft, sub vertical shafts extend services to the 5500L and 3580L respectively.

The Nkana mine has been in operation since 1932 and has produced 6,000,000 tonnes of copper ore so far. Its reserves underground include 108,145,000 tonnes of ore at 1.83% copper and 0.12 cobalt.*

Copper and cobalt mineralisation occur within the ore shale. Copper mineralisation in the deposits changes from mostly chalcopyrite in the South Orebody, to chalcopyrite-bornite in the Central area and to bornite-chalcopyrite at Mindola. Cobalt occurs as carrollite and cobaltiferous pyrite in approximately equal proportions. The mine produces copper and cobalt from three sources: Mindola Shaft, Central Shaft and South Orebody Shaft. Vertical crater retreat is the predominant mining method while sublevel open-stopping and sublevel caving methods are also used.

In April 2011 Mopani announced its intentions to sink a new $295 million shaft at Mufulira. This was going to extend the life of the mine by some twenty-five years. The synclinorium shaft was going to give access to 115 million tonnes of copper ore. Once commissioned in the first quarter of 2015, it was estimated that 600 jobs were going to be created.

=== Nkana Concentrator ===
The Nkana Concentrator is located in Kitwe and treats copper-cobalt sulphide ore using a bulk flotation and segregation flotation flowsheet to produce separate copper and cobalt concentrates. The Nkana Concentrator is one of the most important mineral processing units of Mopani, as it contributes to produce high purity cobalt metal.

=== Nkana Cobalt Plant ===
The cobalt plant treats the cobalt concentrates to produce high purity cobalt metal. The plant is currently on care and maintenance.

In 2013, Mopani invested US$27 million to upgrade its Nkana Cobalt Plant which will result in an increase in production capacity from 2,800 tonnes to 7,000 tonnes of cobalt metal per annum.

== Mopani social and community involvement ==
According to the company itself, MCM is spends around US$16–20 million per year on social projects that include: operating two hospitals and seven township clinics, five first-aid centers and public health departments at Nkana and Mufulira mines. Mopani also runs two schools for 1,850 pupils, HIV and malaria prevention and control programmes, supports local orphanages, charities and sports clubs. Retired miners have also been supplied with opportunities for post-retirement employment at a Mopani supported farm near Mufulira mine.

This is not verified, however, and is only supported by the company itself. Due to serious concerns about Glencore's governance which have been brought to light recently and which go far beyond the Mopani investment, the President of the EIB has instructed the services to decline any further financing request from this company or one of its subsidiaries.

== See also ==
- Mining in Zambia
