= Chembe =

- Town
- Location in Zambia
- Coordinates: 11°57′46″S 28°44′47″E
- Country: Zambia
- Province: Luapula Province
- District: Chembe District
- Time zone: UTC+2 (CAT)

Chembe is a border town in Chembe District in the Luapula Province of Zambia. It once had the Chembe Ferry as a means of crossing the Luapula River from DR Congo to Zambia, but now it is the home of the Mwanawasa Bridge (opened in October 2008), named after former president Levy Mwanawasa. The Mwanawasa Bridge connects the M3 road to the Congo Pedicle road, a dirt highway maintained by Zambia through Congolese territory to link Mansa (formerly known as Fort Rosebery) to the Copperbelt.

== Infrastructure ==
=== Levy Mwanawasa (Chembe) Bridge ===
Levy Mwanawasa (Chembe) Bridge, commissioned in October 2008 for a cost of US$ 1.5 million.

The 350-metre bridge has helped transportation difficulties brought about by the Chembe Ferry of old.

With the pronouncement of Chembe as a new District, it has seen significant economic growth.

=== Chembe Multi-facility Economic Zone ===
In 2016, the government launched the development of the Chembe Multi-facility Economic Zone.

== Mansa Sugar Limited ==
In December 2015, MANSA Sugar Limited, which was incorporated in 2014, proposed to set up a sugar plantation and processing factory in Chembe, Luapula for US$ 60 million.

The Factory was commissioned in September 2018.

Capacity: 500,000 tonnes of sugarcane per annum and 44,380 tonnes of white mill sugar.

== Mansa Chilli Limited ==
In July 2016, Mansa Chilli Limited began constructing a chili-processing plant in the Chembe Multi-Facility Economic Zone.

== Population ==
In 2010 Chembe district had 23,394 inhabitants, and in 2019 the district was projected to go to a number of up to 28,919.
