= Mokambo =

Town of the Democratic Republic of the Congo

- Location within Democratic Republic of the Congo
- Coordinates: 12.42°S 28.35°E

Population (2012)
  - Total: 23,663

Mokambo is a town on the Congo Pedicle road in the Democratic Republic of the Congo, on the border with Zambia. As of 2012, it had an estimated population of 23,663.
