= ZCCM Investments Holdings =

Zambian mining and industrial financial firm

- Traded as: Lusaka: ZCCM-IH
- ISIN: ZM0000000037
- Industry: Mining
- Founded: 2000
- Headquarters: Lusaka, Zambia
- Products: Investments
- Revenue: ▼US$6,470,000 (2025); US$122,700,000 (2024)
- Owners: Government of Zambia 77.7%; minority shareholders 22.3%
- Number of employees: 6,543 (2023); 6,613 (2022)
- Website: www.zccm-ih.com.zm

ZCCM Investments Holdings (ZCCM-IH) is a mining investment and operational firm based in Lusaka, Zambia. The firm is primarily listed on the Lusaka Securities Exchange and secondarily listed on the London Stock Exchange. ZCCM-IH succeeded the country's state-owned mining company, Zambia Consolidated Copper Mines Limited (ZCCM Ltd) in 2000 as a result of series of privatisation measures, retaining minority interest across a number of individual mines throughout the country.

In 2025, Kakenenwa Muyangwa was appointed the CEO of ZCCM-IH after serving as the chairperson of the board. In December 2025, the firm disclosed earnings of $6.47 million USD, a decrease from $122.7 million in 2024, driven by a large transaction for Mopani mine in the Copperbelt region.

== Background ==
Zambia has rich mineral reserves, particularly copper, that have been a critical component of the country's economic and political development. The first mines were opened by the British and began operating in 1904. The country retains about 2.1% of global copper reserves. The investment firm today was born out of the state owned mining company, ZCCM, formed in the late 1960s by a gradual process of nationalisation and corporate consolidation under President Kenneth Kaunda. The investment firm today plays a role in retaining an interest in Zambia's mineral wealth while encouraging investment in the Zambian economy.

Total holdings by ZCCM-IH have been increasing in recent years. This has been driven by a growing demand in copper, and subsequent rise in prices; listing earnings. Contrasting the growing price of commodities, a strengthening of the Zambian kwacha has driven down foreign exchange earnings, deflating financials in 2025. ZCCM-IH continues to attract investment despite a plateau in investment during early 2020s, agreeing to sell a majority stake of a lime and cement company to Chinese-held Wonderful Group of Companies Ltd, one of South Africa's largest conglomerates, in May 2026.

Investments are concentrated in the copper, cobalt and gold sectors, making up 73% of total holdings. The majority of remaining assets, 26%, are in the energy sector. The firm's goal is to increase returns on their domestic investments and build confidence in the investment climate within Zambia.

== History ==
With strong commodity growth, President Kenneth Kaunda, in an attempt to assert sovereignty over the country's future growth implemented the Mulungushi Reforms, beginning in April 1968. The Zambian government declare ownership over the two largest mines at the start of 1969, then owned by Anglo American Corporation and the Roan Select Trust (RST), and acquired a 51% majority stake in all mines operating in the country. By January 1970, the Anglo American and RST holdings respectively became Nchanga Consolidated Copper Mines (NCCM) and Roan Consolidated Mines (RCM).

=== State ownership (1970–1990) ===
The Zambian government then created a new parastatal body, the Mining Development Corporation (MINDECO). At the same time, the Finance and Development Corporation (FINDECO) further enabled Zambian government to gain control of insurance companies and building societies with a growing political demand to provide welfare to citizens through productive assets. Nationalisation was a part of the broader independence movement and social and political reforms by the new governing party. However, foreign-owned banks, such as Barclays, Standard Chartered and Grindlays, successfully resisted takeover. In 1971, INDECO, MINDECO, and FINDECO were brought together under an omnibus parastatal, the Zambia Industrial and Mining Corporation (ZIMCO), to create one of the largest companies in sub-Saharan Africa, with the country's president, Kenneth Kaunda as chairman of the board. The management contracts under which day-to-day operations of the mines had been carried out by Anglo American and RST were ended in 1973. In 1982 NCCM and RCM were merged into the giant ZCCM Ltd. At the time, Anglo American still held a 23.7% majority stake in the conglomerate.

ZCCM Ltd operated ten mines, three smelters, two refineries and a tailings leach plant. ZCCM was owned by ZIMCO (60.3%), an Anglo-American subsidiary ZCI Holdings (27.2%), RST International (7.0%) and the public (5.5%). After nationalisation, copper prices declined due to changing global macroeconomics conditions, particularly the 1973 oil price spike, which drove up production costs. Copper production subsequently plummeted from its peak of 708,000 metric tonnes in 1969 to a low of 259,573 metric tonnes in 2000.

=== Privatisation (1990s) ===
Privatisation began gradually, and under discussion with a number of domestic and foreign actors between 1992-1996 after the election of Frederik Chiluba, and the wider adoption of outgoing president Kaunda's 1990 reforms. Kaunda was pressured into adopting a series of reforms by the World Bank, International Monetary Fund and other donors, focused primarily in non-strategic sectors outside of mining.

The privatisation of ZCCM commenced in 1996, after GRZ and the Boards of ZCCM and the Zambia Privatisation Agency (ZPA) approved the ZCCM Limited Privatisation Report and Plan presented by UK based financial and legal advisors, NM Rothschild & Sons and Clifford Chance, respectively.

The objectives, which the government was seeking to achieve through the privatisation of ZCCM, were to:

- Transfer control of and operating responsibilities for ZCCM's operations to private sector mining companies as quickly as practicable
- Mobilise substantial amounts of committed new capital for ZCCM's operations
- Ensure that ZCCM realised value for its assets and retained a significant minority interest in principal mining operations
- Transfer or extinguish ZCCM's liabilities, including its third-party debt
- Diversify ownership of Copperbelt assets
- Promote Zambian participation in the ownership and management of the mining assets
- Conduct the privatisation as quickly and transparently as consistent with good order, respecting other objectives and observing ZCCM Ltd's existing contractual obligations

As part of the privatization process, the company's mining assets were unbundled and sold off as separate new entities or business packages to the private sector. The reason for unbundling the ZCCM Ltd into business packages was to promote diversity of ownership and minimise political and economic risks. A two-stage privatisation process was adopted. First, majority interests in the packages relating to certain of ZCCM Ltd's mining and power distribution operations were offered to trade buyers, which was to leave the transformed ZCCM Ltd as an Investments Holdings Company, with minority interest in each of these packages. Through the newly formed ZCCM Investments Holdings Plc., the government would retain a minority interests of not more than 21% within each of the business packages.

ZCCM was sold in 1998 for US$627 million, split into 7 units, including Konkola Copper Mine ($25 million), Kansanshi Mine ($28 million), Luanshya Mine ($35 million), Chibuluma Mine ($17.5 million), Chambishi Mine ($20 million) and others. Stage two of the privatisation of ZCCM envisaged GRZ disposing of some or all of its shareholding, with part of this being earmarked for Zambian institutional and private investors as a way of promoting Zambian participation in the mining sector.

GRZ obtained the support of the World Bank and the Nordic Development Fund for the Copperbelt Environment Project (CEP), to address environmental liabilities and obligations remaining with GRZ/ZCCM-IH following the privatization of mining assets. The Environmental Management Facility (EMF) which is composed of multiple stakeholders, working as the EMF Steering Committee, was established by the Minister of Finance and National Planning as provided for by the protocols, for the purpose of prioritizing and approving subprojects of the CEP for funding. The project which became effective on 31 July 2003 ends in August 2008. Apart from environmental responsibilities ZCCM-IH has the additional responsibility of managing the ex ZCCM employees trust fund and also the finalization sale of ZCCM properties. In November 2011, the role and importance of ZCCM-IH have been highlighted, led then Minister of Mines Wylbur Simuusa, representing the government as a major stakeholder. In a public statement he said:

"Through its state mining investment company, Zambia Consolidated Copper Mines Investment Holdings, the government is finalizing plans to start negotiations with mining companies aimed at increasing its stakes in projects to as much as 35%...There is need for the country to have increased ownership in the mines and ZCCM-IH is an engine which can facilitate the process. ZCCM-IH is an important unit which if properly managed, can help the country realise huge benefits from the mining resources."

=== Modern organisation (2010s–) ===
In 2011, Patriotic Front politician Michael Sata was elected as president. Sata appointed Wila D. Mung'omba was appointed as Executive Chairman of ZCCM-IH with effect from 1 December 2011. Mung'omba came with experience, as he previously served as Group A Director of ZCCM Limited in 1996 to 1998. At the same time, between 1995 and 1998, Mung'omba was appointed as the World Bank team lead in the initial preparation of the ZCCM Limited privatisation reforms. He then helped create the present form of ZCCM-IH. For five years he served as non-executive director on the initial board of the Emerging African Infrastructure Fund (EAIF), a donor-funded financial instrument to encourage public and private sector partnership in infrastructure development in Sub-Saharan Africa.

Once critique of privatisation was the worry that social spending on health, education, urban infrastructure on the Copperbelt had been negatively impacted.

== Corporate structure and asset ownership ==
=== Assets ===
According to the 2024 Annual report published by the organization, ZCCM-IH currently holds an interest in 24 assets across Zambia. 73.6% of assets are in gold, copper and cobalt, while 26% are energy assets. The remaining .4% are services, including commercial banking. A comprehensive list of assets are below.

ZCCM-IH Investment Holdings (2024)
Asset	Interest share (%)	Sector (broad)
Limestone Resources Limited	100	Limeston
Ndola Lime Company	100	Limestone
Nkandabwe Coal Mine Limited	100	Coal
Misenge Environmental and Technical Services Limited	100	Services in mining
Kariba Minerals Limited	100	Amethyst
Mushe Milling Limited	100	Milling
Kabundi Resources Limited	100	Manganese
Investrust Bank Plc	71.4	Commercial banking
Zambia Gold Company Limited	51	Gold
Mopani Copper Mines Plc	40	Copper
Central African Cement Limited	49	Cement, thermal power
Rembrandt Properties Limited	49	Real estate
Maamba Energy Limited	35	Coal, thermal power
Copperbelt Energy Corporation Plc	32.41	Energy distribution
Konkola Copper Mines Plc	20.60	Copper, cobalt
Lubambe Copper Mine Plc	20	Copper
CNMC Luashya Copper Mines Plc	20	Copper
Kansanshi Mine Plc	20	Copper, gold
Mingomba Mining Limited	20	Copper
Copper Tree Minerals Limited	15.60	Copper
NFCA Africa Mining Plc	15	Copper
Chibuluma Mines Plc	15	Copper
Nkana Alloy	15	Copper
Chambishi Metals Plc	10	Copper, cobalt

ZCCM-IH acquired 90% shareholding of MCM previously held by Glencore Corporation through Carlisa Investment Corporation (73.1%) and First Quantum Mining (16.9%), giving ZCCMIH 100% control of the Mopani mining asset. The Government of Zambia and Glencore Corporation signed an off-take arrangement deal, such that producer and buyer agree to purchase or sell all or portions of the producer's forthcoming goods or commodities to the market. In this case, Glencore Corporation agreed to sell 90% of its shares to ZCCM-IH, which will fully own the mines after the transaction has been fully settled. ZCCM-IH and Glencore deal is based on a no-cash transfer basis.

=== Shareholders ===
Prior to privatization in 2000, ZCCM Ltd was a consolidated copper-mining conglomerate, majority-owned by the Government of the Republic of Zambia (GRZ). Until 31 March 2000, ZCCM Ltd was a 60.3% state-owned, mine-operating company in which Zambia Copper Investments Ltd (ZCI), an associate company of Anglo American Plc, held 27.3% of shares, with the balance of 12.4% of shares held by private investors.

Since the privatisation of ZCCM, and the creation of the modern state investment company today, there is a mix of share classes available to purchase. The company is now publicly listed on the Lusaka Stock Exchange, the London Stock Exchange and on Euronext in Paris. The majority of its investments held in the copper mining sector of Zambia.

Shares are held by either Class A or Class B investors. The Industrial Development Corporation (IDC) of Zambia owns 60.28% (96,926,669 shares) of shares. IDC is a Class A shareholder. The GRZ owns 17.25% (27,735,173 shares) of shares, and is a Class B shareholder. The National Pension Scheme Authority (NAPSA) owns another 15% of shares (24,120,043 shares), and is also a Class B shareholder. Minority shareholders also hold Class B shares and constitute the remaining 7.47% (12,018,401 shares) of shares.

Minority shareholders are spread throughout the world, in various locations.

- Within Europe: England, Belgium, France, Netherlands, Scotland, Switzerland, Greece, Channel Islands, Irish Republic, Portugal, Norway and the Principality of Monaco.
- Within Africa: South Africa, Zambia, Zimbabwe, Botswana, Tunisia, Egypt, Nigeria, Algeria, Republique Du Congo and Morocco.
- Within Australasia and other regions: Australia, New Zealand, India, Oman, Pakistan, Sri Lanka, Jamaica, Bahamas and USA.

== Financial disclosures ==
ZCCM Investment Holdings Plc, as a publicly traded firm must disclose its financial reports. The financial summary for the previous five years, including trend on income, balance sheet and cash flow are available through public disclosure.

Statement of income extract for the last five years

All values in Zambian kwacha.

	31 Dec 20	31 Dec 21	31 Dec 22	31 Dec 23	31 Dec 24
Total comprehensive income				13,465,775,000	25,113,888,000
Atrributable PAT				(4,075,823,000)	39,846,651,000

Statement of financial position for the last five years

All values in Zambian kwacha.

	31 March 15	31 March 16	31 March 17	31 March 18	31 March 19
Shareholders funds	7,369,959,000	8,326,228,000	8,013,913,000	8,940,346,000	11,124,784,000
Net interest bearing debt	223,671,000	257,113,000	13,131,000	(205,683,000)	29,877,000
Cash on hand	43,782,000	35,850,000	178,931,000	339,386,000	74,480,000
Interest bearing debt	267,453,000	292,963,000	192,062,000	133,703,000	104,357,000
Net current assets	94,857,000	(179,282,000)	261,490,000	628,946,000	(169,196,000)

== See also ==
- Mining in Zambia
- Economy of Zambia
