= Chipili (constituency) =

Constituency of the National Assembly of Zambia

Chipili is a constituency of the National Assembly of Zambia. It covers the town of Chipili in Chipili District of Luapula Province.

== List of MPs ==
Election year	MP	Party
1973	David Makumbi	United National Independence Party
1978	Whynter Chabala	United National Independence Party
1983	Enock Mwena	United National Independence Party
1988	Enock Mwewa	United National Independence Party
1991	Ntondo Chindoloma	Movement for Multi-Party Democracy
1996	Ntondo Chindoloma	Movement for Multi-Party Democracy
2001	Jason Mfula	Movement for Multi-Party Democracy
2006	Davies Mwila	Patriotic Front
2011	Davies Mwila	Patriotic Front
2016	Jewis Chabi	Independent
2021	Paul Chala	Patriotic Front
2026	Robert Musonda	Citizens First
