= Congo Pedicle =

Southern protrusion of Congo into Zambia

Coordinates: 12°17′S 28°34′E

Zambia's butterfly shape formed by the Congo Pedicle

The Congo Pedicle (at one time referred to as the Zaire Pedicle; in French, la botte du Katanga, meaning 'Katanga boot') is the southeast salient of the Haut-Katanga Province of the Democratic Republic of the Congo, which divides neighbouring Zambia into two lobes. In area, the pedicle is similar in size to Wales or New Jersey. 'Pedicle' is used in the sense of 'a little foot'. 'Congo Pedicle' or 'the Pedicle' is also used to refer to the Congo Pedicle road, which crosses it.

The Congo Pedicle is an example of the boundaries imposed by European powers on Africa in the wake of the Scramble for Africa, which were set by European interests and usually did not consider pre-existing political or tribal boundaries.

As it is located at the country's southeastern extremity, its eastern end is closer to the capital cities of 17 other African countries than its own, Kinshasa.

== British and Belgian territorial claims ==
Cecil Rhodes's British South Africa Company (BSAC) approached Katanga from the south, and the Belgian King Leopold II's Congo Free State (CFS) approached from the northwest. Southeast Katanga was controlled by the Yeke or Garanganze kingdom of Msiri based at Bunkeya (see map), and the BSAC and CFS competed to sign treaties with him while he tried to play one off against the other.

After Msiri's death the CFS was quicker to consolidate their claim to Msiri's territory called 'Garanganza', and later Katanga, west up to the Luapula. Since 1885 they already had claimed land north of the Congo-Zambezi watershed. The BSAC was left with the land south of the watershed and east of the Luapula. The 1884–85 Berlin Conference was organised by Germany to resolve the outcome of the Scramble for Africa. It did not set the actual boundaries, but agreed areas of influence, including the CFS's control over the Congo. Detailed borders were left to bilateral negotiations.

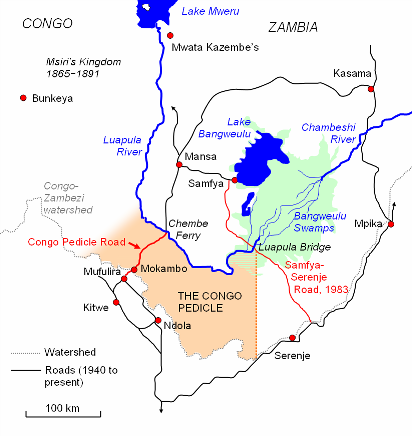
Map showing the Congo Pedicle relative to the borders formed by the Luapula River and Congo-Zambezi watershed.

=== Negotiating borders ===
The main problem of both the Belgian and British sides over the southeast Katanga border was the lack of an obvious geographical feature for the border to follow, as the Congo-Zambezi watershed boundary and the Luapula do not meet. Separated by a distance of 70 to 150 km (43.50 to 93.21 mi), they run in an arc curving southeast then northeast, running almost parallel but gradually getting closer, and would reach the highlands between Lakes Tanganyika and Nyasa if the Chambeshi River, considered the ultimate source stream of the Congo River, were accepted as being the same river as the Luapula.

From the British point of view, the obvious choice for the border would have been southwest to northeast line from the watershed to the Luapula. Failing agreement on that, a second option would be to continue southwards the line of the Luapula-Lake Mweru valley (longitude 28° 35' E) which forms the longest north–south part of the border, until it intersects the Congo-Zambezi watershed, so all of the country immediately east of a north–south line through Ndola would then be in Northern Rhodesia. But the Belgians hoped for access to the rich game areas of the Bangweulu Wetlands and pressed for the borders to stick to the river and watershed. In negotiations for a treaty some 'trading' of territories was involved in northeast Congo, Sudan and Uganda. There was also the question of how far east into the Bangweulu swamps and floodplain the Pedicle should extend. The king of Italy was called in to adjudicate, and he drew a north–south line (a line of longitude) through a point on the map where the Luapula was thought to exit from the Lake Bangweulu swamps, which gave birth to the Pedicle: 70 to 100 km (43.50 to 62.14 mi) wide and about 200 kilometres (120 mi) long.

=== Anglo-Belgian Agreement of 12 May 1894 ===
The agreement was incorporated into this larger treaty between Great Britain and King Leopold II, which dealt mainly with Equatoria.

=== Anglo-Belgian Boundary Commission, 1911–1914 ===
It became apparent as the region was more closely surveyed that on the ground there were a number of problems. The Luapula does not always flow in a single channel; there are islands, swamps, multiple channels; and the main channel may change according to the river height. It is particularly confusing south of Bangweulu, where there is not one single clear channel exiting the swamps but a tangled mass of channels in swamps and floodplains tens of kilometres wide, and the Italian king's line of longitude crossed them at multiple points.

An Anglo-Belgian Boundary Commission was established in 1911 to survey the boundaries on the ground, resolve the problems and mark the border with posts and timber towers used for triangulation. The Italian king's ruler was moved west to a point where it did cut a clearly defined channel in one place. Finally, the work was complete in 1914.

== Consequences for Northern Rhodesia/Zambia ==
As a consequence of Katanga attaining the Pedicle, it gained a toehold in the Bangweulu Wetlands and potential mineral resources, although as it turned out, the division of the main copper orebody between the Congo and Northern Rhodesia was determined by the Congo–Zambezi watershed and would not have been affected by the existence or otherwise of the Pedicle. It was the BSAC's failure to get Msiri to sign up Garanganza as a British protectorate which lost the Congolese Copperbelt to Northern Rhodesia, and some in the BSAC complained that the British missionaries Frederick Stanley Arnot and Charles Swan could have done more to help, although their Plymouth Brethren mission had a policy of not being involved in politics. Once Msiri was killed by the CFS it was too late to try again, and consequently the leader of CFS expedition responsible, Canadian Captain William Grant Stairs was viewed by some in Northern Rhodesia as a traitor to the British Empire.

=== Strategic issues for Zambia ===
The problems for Zambia did not emerge for another 50 years, with the Congo Crisis of 1960–63. The Pedicle cuts off the Luapula Province and the western part of the Northern Province from the country's industrial and commercial hub of the Copperbelt. This is exacerbated by the fact that at the Pedicle's toe tip, where the Luapula River ostensibly flows out of the Bangweulu system, the river swamps are at least 6 kilometres (3.7 mi) wide and the floodplain is 60 kilometres (37 mi) wide, making a road impossible with the resources available for most of the 20th century. The most southerly road possible into Luapula keeping to Zambian territory was pushed, by these circumstances, another 200 kilometres (120 mi) north, going around Lake Bangweulu.

Strategically, the Congo Pedicle is an issue for Zambia, though not for DR Congo. As well as affecting communication for about one-quarter of the country with the centre and west, it potentially exposes a greater part of Zambia, which has generally enjoyed peace for more than 100 years, to conflict in Katanga, which has not. Zambia has witnessed violence in Katanga between armed factions and by the military against civilians which occasionally has spilled over into Zambia, or which has affected Zambians travelling on the Pedicle road. At times, it has been closed to them making the huge detour around the north and east of Bangweulu the only option. Secondly, cross-border crime and arms smuggling has been a problem in the Copperbelt, as has poaching in the Bangweulu Wetlands.

== See also ==
- Sakania Territory
- Alfred Sharpe
- Caprivi Strip
