= T3 road (Zambia) =

Road in Zambia

T3 Road

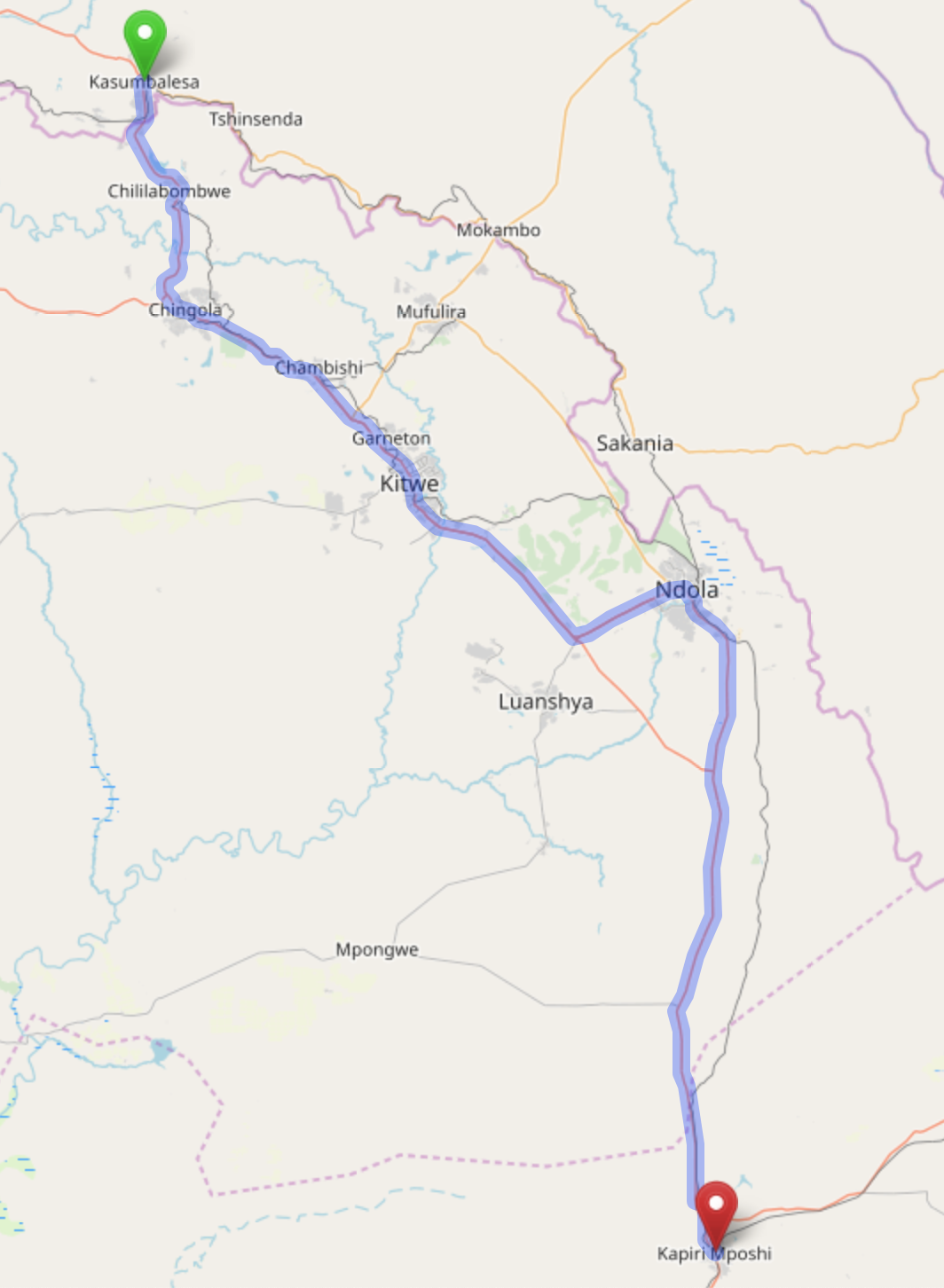
- Route of the T3 through the Copperbelt

Route information
- Length: 263 km (163 mi)

Major junctions
- South end: T2 (Great North Road) near Kapiri Mposhi
- M6 south of Ndola; M4 in Ndola; M6 near Luanshya; M7 in Kitwe; M16 near Chambishi; M4 near Chambishi; T5 in Chingola
- North end: National Road 1 at the Kasumbalesa border with DR Congo

Location
- Country: Zambia
- Provinces: Central, Copperbelt
- Major cities: Ndola, Kitwe, Chingola

Highway system
- Transport in Zambia
← T2	→ T4

The T3 is a trunk road in Zambia. The road runs from Kapiri Mposhi via Ndola, Kitwe and Chingola to Kasumbalesa on the border with DR Congo. The entire route is a toll road.

In Kapiri Mposhi, the T3 connects with the T2 to Lusaka, making it part of the main link between Zambia's capital city and DR Congo.

The T3 is the main route through the Copperbelt Province, passing through 4 and bypassing 1 of the 10 main towns in the province. It is also the main linkage between Kapiri Mposhi and towns of the North-Western Province of Zambia.

The T3 is entirely part of the Trans-African Highway network 9 or Beira-Lobito Highway, which connects Beira in Mozambique with Lobito in Angola. The T3 is also part of the Walvis Bay-Ndola-Lubumbashi Development Road. The T3 is part of the main connection between DR Congo and countries to the south and south-east, like Malawi, Namibia, Botswana, Mozambique, Zimbabwe and South Africa. As a result, the roads that make up the T3 are usually very busy in either direction (mostly with trucks).

== Route ==
The T3 starts north of Kapiri Mposhi, Central Province, at a t-junction with the T2 road (Tanzam Highway; Cairo–Cape Town Highway; Zambia's Great North Road), going northwards. After the first 10 kilometres, the road crosses into the Copperbelt Province.

From the T2 junction, the T3 heads north for 110 km, through Masaiti District (where it passes through the Kafulafuta Toll Plaza before reaching a junction with the M6 road), to the city of Ndola (capital of the Copperbelt), known as The Friendly City. As Kabwe Road, it enters Ndola in a northwesterly direction, bypassing the industrial area of Bwana Mkubwa. At the roundabout after Jacaranda Mall, the T3 continues by way of following the road to the left. The road goes in a north-northwesterly direction as Nkana Road, crossing the Kafubu River and becoming an uphill road, where it separates the city centre from the Kanini neighbourhood. At the roundabout by the Ndola Teaching Hospital, the T3 continues westwards by way of a left turn onto Luanshya Road (2 lanes in each direction), where it separates the Hillcrest and Kansenshi neighbourhoods.

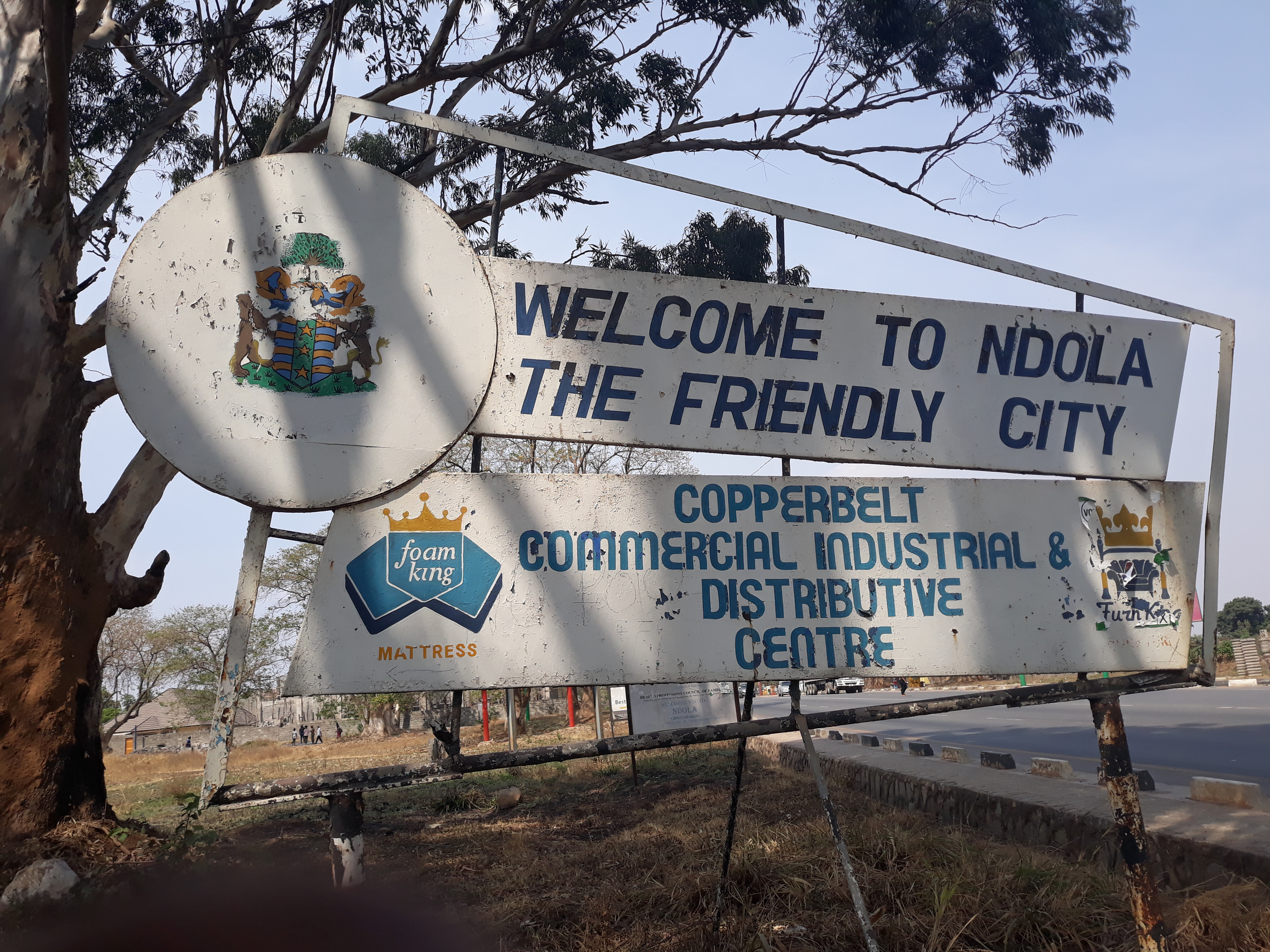
A sign on the T3 road depicting Ndola as The Friendly City

By Levy Mwanawasa Stadium at a roundabout, the T3 meets the Ndola-Mufulira Road (designated as the M4 road), which is the road that connects to the Congo Pedicle (the area of DR Congo separating the Copperbelt Province and Luapula Province of Zambia). Many motorists coming from Southern Zambia prefer to use this route through Ndola, Mufulira and the Congo Pedicle road to reach Mansa in Luapula Province instead of the longer route going east of Kapiri Mposhi, due to this route requiring less time.

At the Levy Mwanawasa Stadium roundabout, the T3 becomes the Ndola-Kitwe Dual Carriageway, which is the road between Ndola and Kitwe (2 lanes in each direction). As a v-shaped carriageway, the dual carriageway begins by first going west-south-west for 17 kilometres, through the Michael Chilufya Sata Toll Plaza, to the Luanshya Turn-Off north of Fisenge, where there is a road southwards (the M6 road) that provides access to the town of Luanshya (8 km away). Before the Michael Chilufya Sata Toll Plaza, the carriageway meets a road which provides access to the Dag Hammarskjöld Crash Site Memorial and the Simon Mwansa Kapwepwe International Airport. At the Luanshya Turn, the dual carriageway turns to the north-west and goes for another 37 km to the city centre of Kitwe, a commercial city.

A road sign at the Luanshya Turn-off on the Ndola - Kitwe Dual Carriageway.

The road enters Kitwe city centre as President Avenue, beginning by crossing the Kafue River, passing the Luangwa and Wusakili neighbourhoods and bypassing the Nkana Mine. After being the road separating the Nkana East and Nkana West neighbourhoods, the T3 continues by way of a left turn onto Oxford Road and a right turn onto Independence Avenue in the city centre.

At the Kanyanta Road roundabout in the city centre, the T3 meets the eastern terminus of the M7 road, which is the route that connects with Kalulushi, Lufwanyama and Kasempa in the west. It is the 1st route with access to the North-Western Province.

As Independence Avenue, it is the road connecting Kitwe Central with the northern suburbs of the city. From Kitwe Teaching Hospital, the T3 travels north-west for 50 km to the mining city of Chingola as the Kitwe-Chingola Dual Carriageway (2 lanes in each direction), passing through the mining town of Chambishi (part of Kalulushi District). At Sabina, 15 kilometres from the Kitwe city centre (10 kilometres before Chambishi), the T3 meets the northern terminus of the M16 road (which is coming from Kalulushi) before meeting another road connecting to Mufulira and the Congo Pedicle road in the northeast, named Kitwe Road and designated as the M4 road again. Just before the M16 junction (just after Kitwe's Garneton suburb) is the Wilson Mofya Chakulya Toll Plaza.

As the Kitwe city centre is a busy commercial area, most heavy vehicles are advised to take an alternative route to Chambishi rather than passing through Kitwe's city centre and northern suburbs. Trucks are advised to use the M7 road from Kitwe to Kalulushi, then the M16 road from Kalulushi to Sabina, as an alternative route. Sabina is where trucks rejoin the main road. While the T3 has the Wilson Mofya Chakulya Toll Plaza before Sabina, this alternative route for trucks also has a tollgate before Sabina (Kalulushi-Sabina Toll Plaza) on the M16.

At the Independence Avenue roundabout south of Chingola Central, the T3 continues by way of a left turn. It goes northwest, separating the south-western part of Chingola from the central and eastern areas (bypassing Kasompe Airport & the Nchanga Copper mine). North-west of Chingola Central, by the Chingola River, the T3 meets the eastern terminus of the T5 road, which connects the Copperbelt with Solwezi and Mwinilunga in the North-Western Province and with a border into Angola.

From the T5 junction in Chingola, the T3 goes north for 17 km, crossing the Kafue River one more time, to the town of Chililabombwe. It goes for a further 17 km, through the Konkola Toll Plaza, bypassing Konkola Copper Mines in Konkola, to end at the Kasumbalesa border with DR Congo. The road becomes the N1 route of DR Congo and proceeds to Lubumbashi (100 kilometres away) in the north-west. The border town on the DR Congo side is also named Kasumbalesa.

== Road Network ==
The T3 is entirely part of the Trans-African Highway network no. 9 or Beira-Lobito Highway, which connects Beira in Mozambique with Lobito in Angola. The T3 is also part of the Walvis Bay-Ndola-Lubumbashi Development Road between DR Congo and Namibia.

The T3 is part of the main connection between DR Congo and countries in the south and south-east, including Zambia, Malawi, Namibia, Botswana, Zimbabwe, Mozambique and South Africa. As a result, it is an important trade route and is commonly used by cars and trucks in either direction.

The border at Kasumbalesa is a very-busy border post, with a large number of trucks passing there per day.

== M6 road (Copperbelt) ==
M6 Road

Route information
- Length: 41 km (25 mi)

Major junctions
- East end: T3 near Kafulafuta
- T3 near Luanshya
- West end: Luanshya town centre

Location
- Country: Zambia
- Provinces: Copperbelt
- Towns: Luanshya

Highway system
- Transport in Zambia
← M5	→ M7

The M6 (Fisenge Bypass) is an alternative route, bypassing the city of Ndola and providing a shorter, more direct route to both Kitwe and Luanshya. It starts at a junction with the T3 approximately 34 kilometres south of Ndola by Masangano in Masaiti District (near Kafulafuta), going north-west for 33 kilometres (crossing the Kafubu River) and rejoins the T3 just north of the small area of Fisenge in Luanshya District (8 km north of Luanshya), at the point where the T3 turns to the direction of Kitwe. The 8 km road from Fisenge southwards to the Luanshya town centre is also designated as the M6.

This route is used by people who wish to bypass the city of Ndola when travelling from Kapiri Mposhi to Kitwe. The bypass reduces the distance to Kitwe by 22 kilometres.

As part of the deal made by the government of Zambia in 2017 to construct the Lusaka-Ndola Dual Carriageway, an agreement was made to also rehabilitate the entire 41 km length of the M6 from Masangano through Fisenge to the Luanshya town centre. After the deal was renegotiated in February 2023 as a public-private partnership (concession), rehabilitating the entire M6 remained part of the Lusaka-Ndola Dual Carriageway agreement and maintenance by the private company up to February 2048 was included in the agreement.

The Road Development Agency stated that the works on the M6 road from Masangano to Luanshya were expected to be completed by 30 December 2024. The works were 100% completed in January 2025. The National Road Fund Agency stated that the M6 road would also have a toll gate placed on it by the concessionaire. The toll gate was named the Abram Mokola Toll Plaza and started operating on 18 April 2025. The toll gate was commissioned by Charles Milupi (the Minister of Infrastructure, Housing and Urban Development) on 10 August 2025.

== Lusaka-Ndola Dual Carriageway ==
On 8 September 2017, President Edgar Lungu commissioned the construction of the Lusaka-Ndola Dual Carriageway. This proposed route construction would transform the T2 road (Great North Road) from Lusaka to Kapiri Mposhi, together with the T3 road from Kapiri Mposhi to Ndola (a total distance of 320 kilometres), into a dual carriageway with 2 lanes in each direction to ease the movement of vehicles such as trucks, buses and motor vehicles and reduce on accidents. As part of the same project, they would also do works on the 41-kilometre M6 road from Masangano in Masaiti District through Fisenge to Luanshya (as a shortcut to Kitwe; used by motorists wishing to avoid Ndola when travelling between Kapiri Mposhi and Kitwe).

This new dual carriageway would require bypasses around the towns of Kabwe and Kapiri Mposhi together with some grade-separated interchanges where necessary. Together with the already-existing Ndola-Kitwe Dual Carriageway and Kitwe-Chingola Dual Carriageway in the Copperbelt Province, this proposed road would provide a faster and safer journey from Lusaka to DR Congo.

The total cost of this 320 km road, after several increments, was finalized at $1.2 billion and construction began from Lusaka going northwards. Certain elements of society criticized the high cost of the road, as it would cost just over $3.7 million per kilometre. The deal was made with the China Jiangxi Corporation for International Economic and Technical Cooperation (CJIC) to construct the road.

However, only the section of the T2 (Great North Road) within the capital city (Lusaka District), up to the Six Miles Roundabout, was completed by June 2021, with the Ministry of Finance ordering for the Road Development Agency to halt the project, citing financial constraints.

In November 2021 (just after Zambia's Presidential election), the newly-appointed Infrastructure, Housing and Urban Development Minister, Charles Milupi, stated that the road would cost less than the prescribed $1.2 billion under President Hakainde Hichilema's government. Road construction would only resume once the price has been renegotiated to a lower amount; otherwise, the project was not cancelled.

So, the newly-formed government officially cancelled the deal that the previous government made with the China Jiangxi Corporation for International Economic and Technical Cooperation (CJIC), citing that the project was overpriced.

In early 2022, Hon Charles Milupi stated that completing this dual carriageway was of high importance. He stated that they would resume works on that road at a reduced cost after the rain season would pass in Zambia. Then, the Minister of Finance, Situmbeko Musokotwane, stated that this project (Lusaka-Ndola Dual Carriageway) would be financed by a "public–private partnership" (PPP).

On 28 February 2023, the Minister of Finance, Situmbeko Musokotwane, together with other ministers, re-commissioned the construction of the Lusaka-Ndola Dual Carriageway at Protea Hotel in Ndola. The project was initially expected to cost $577 million and is being financed by a public–private partnership (concession). The consortium responsible for the construction and maintenance of the road is Macro-Ocean Investment Consortium. The road being transformed into a dual carriageway is from the Cairo Road/Great East Road roundabout (Kabwe Roundabout) in Lusaka to the Ndola Central Hospital roundabout (327 kilometres). It was expected to take 3 years to completion and the concession agreement is for another 22 years (up to 2048).

In August 2023, emergency works commenced on the section of the T3 road in the Bwana Mkubwa Constituency (bypassing the Ndeke suburb), as the road was in a bad state. On top of rehabilitation, the road was being transformed into a dual carriageway and construction on this stretch of road was scheduled to last 3 months (up to November 2023). The rehabilitation of this stretch was completed.

On 26 March 2024 at a contract signing, the National Pension Scheme Authority (NAPSA) stated that the Lusaka-Ndola Dual Carriageway project is expected to cost $650 million and that it would be completed in 36 months. NAPSA lent $300 million in funding to Macro-Ocean Investment Consortium for the project, while the Workers Compensation Fund Control Board (WCFCB) also lent $50 million in funding for the project. President Hakainde Hichilema officiated at the ground-breaking ceremony for the project in Kapiri Mposhi on 21 May 2024.

In June 2024, it was reported that roadworks were happening concurrently on four different stretches (divided into four lots), namely between Lusaka and Chibombo (90 kilometres), between Chibombo and Kapiri Mposhi (115 kilometres), between Kapiri Mposhi and Ndola (115 kilometres), and on the M6 road between Masangano and Luanshya via Fisenge (45 kilometres).

On 7 October 2024, the National Road Fund Agency (NRFA) stated that the three already-existing toll gates on the 320-kilometre stretch between Lusaka and Ndola (Katuba; Manyumbi; Kafulafuta) will be handed over to the concessionaire (Macro Ocean Investment Consortium) on 30 November 2024. They stated that any toll fees collected at the three toll gates will be directed to an Escrow account that will be controlled by both the concessionaire and the government until the project is complete in 2026, when the concessionaire will take over full operations of maintaining the road and collecting tolls. They stated that an additional toll gate will be added on the T2 in-between Chibombo and Kabwe while a toll gate will also be placed on the M6 road (Masangano-Fisenge road; the road used to bypass Ndola on the way to Luanshya and Kitwe).

The toll gate on the M6 road (Masangano-Fisenge Road) was named the Abram Mokola Toll Plaza and started operating on 18 April 2025. Minister Charles Milupi commissioned the toll gate on 10 August 2025. At the commissioning, the Ministry of Infrastructure, Housing and Urban Development reported that 45.6% of the Lusaka-Ndola Dual Carriageway project had been complete. The Road Development Agency board chairperson reported on 24 November 2025 that almost 60% of the project is complete. It was reported on 21 June 2026 that 78% of the project has been completed, with the Kapiri Mposhi Bypass (18 km) being opened to traffic.

In mid-November 2026, it was reported by the Road Development Agency and the Minister of Infrastructure and Urban Development (Collins Nzovu) that the Lusaka-Ndola Dual Carriageway project is 90% complete.

== Chingola-Kasumbalesa road concession ==
On 31 October 2022, the government of Zambia signed a Public–private partnership (concession) agreement for the 35 kilometre stretch of the T3 from the T5 junction in Chingola through Chililabombwe to the Kasumbalesa border post with DR Congo. The consortium responsible for the design, finance, reconstruction and maintenance of this stretch of road is Turbo-Ka-Chin Investment Consortium and the project was priced at $31 million, with the construction of the Konkola toll plaza in-between Chililabombwe and Kasumbalesa. The concession is for 18 years (up to 2040) and the government agreed in 2023 that the consortium would collect the toll fees earned at the Konkola Toll Plaza in order to regain the amount they spent rehabilitating the road. The rehabilitation of the road started in April 2023 and was completed in November 2023, with the toll gate starting operations in the same month. President Hakainde Hichilema, alongside a few ministers, commissioned the Chingola-Kasumbalesa road on 12 April 2024 at the Konkola Toll Plaza.

=== Incidents ===
The Kakoso Stream crossing south of Chililabombwe was washed away by heavy rains on the evening of 28 February 2026, effectively cutting the town from the rest of the nation. The movement of trucks at the Kasumbalesa border with DR Congo to the north of Chililabombwe was suspended by the Zambia Revenue Authority. The Ministry of Infrastructure, Housing and Urban Development together with the Chililabombwe District Council and Turbo Ka-Chin Consortium (with assistance from Konkola Copper Mines) started works to construct an alternative crossing within 48 hours with plans to repair the main bridge. A detour was opened on the evening of 3 March 2026 in order for traffic to resume in both directions.

== See also ==
- Transport in Zambia
- Roads in Zambia
