= Roads in Zambia =

Numbered Routes in Zambia

In Zambia some roads are designated as numbered routes to help with navigation. There is a nationwide numbering scheme consisting of Inter-Territorial roads, Territorial roads, District roads and Rural roads.

Out of a total of 91,440 km of roads in Zambia (2001), 20,117 km were paved and 6,779 km were part of Inter-Territorial Roads or Territorial Roads. 71,323 km of roads were unpaved (Some of the unpaved highways are graded laterite roads).

Every Inter-Territorial Road, together with many Territorial Roads and a few District Roads, are designated as Toll roads. The tollgates are administered by the National Road Fund Agency (NRFA) and the Road Development Agency (RDA) together with concessionaires (public-private partnerships) for some roads.

In October 2022, at a symposium was dubbed “Sustainable infrastructure development using cement and concrete technologies", Road Development Agency (RDA), Chilanga Cement, Dangote Limited and Bari Zambia Limited signed an agreement to partner on the development of concrete roads across the country.

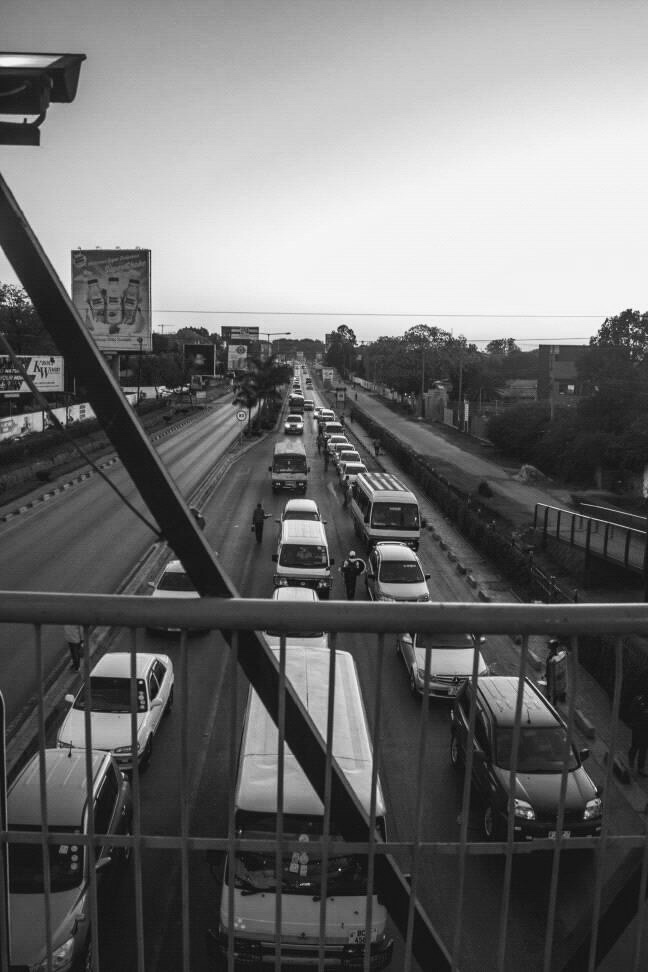
Cars along the Great East Road in Lusaka

== History ==
In the 1970s Zambia had one of the best highway networks in sub-Saharan Africa. In 1991 it was estimated by the National Road Fund Agency (NRFA) that 80 percent of the road network had deteriorated and out of total road assets valued at US$2.3 billion, US$400 million had been lost due to neglected maintenance. The government introduced a road fund levy on fuel and that together with international aid has improved the highway network. In 2004 the NRFA rated 57% of paved roads in good condition, 22% in fair condition and 21% in poor condition.

== Inter-Territorial Roads ==
Inter-territorial roads are the main routes used to connect Zambia with other countries. They are designated with a letter T followed by a number from 1 to 6.

Number	Description	Length	Notes
T1 road (Zambia)	Turnpike - Choma - Livingstone - Zimbabwe	430 km	
T2 road (Zambia)	Tanzania - Mpika - Kabwe - Lusaka - Zimbabwe	1155 km	part of the route is known as the Great North Road.
T3 road (Zambia)	Kapiri Mposhi - Ndola - Kitwe - Chingola - Congo	263 km	
T4 road (Zambia)	Lusaka - Petauke - Katete - Chipata - Malawi	595 km	
T5 road (Zambia)	Chingola - Solwezi - Mwinilunga - Angola	545 km	
T6 road (Zambia)	Katete - Mozambique	56 km	

== Territorial Roads ==
Territorial Roads are the main routes connecting different towns of Zambia in areas where there is no Inter-Territorial Road. They are designated with an M followed by a number from 1 to 20.

Number	Description	Length
M1 road (Zambia)	Mpika - Kasama - Mbala - Tanzania	404 km
M2 road (Zambia)	Mbala - Mpulungu	38 km
M3 road (Zambia)	Kasama - Mansa - Congo	434 km
M4 road (Zambia)	Sabina - Mufulira - Ndola	85 km
M5 road (Zambia)	Mufulira - Congo	18 km
M6 road (Zambia)	Kafulafuta - Luanshya	41 km
M7 road (Zambia)	Kitwe - Kalulushi	15 km
M8 road (Zambia)	Mutanda - Kawana - Mufumbwe - Kabompo - Zambezi	464 km
M9 road (Zambia)	Lusaka - Mumbwa - Kaoma - Mongu	584 km
M10 road (Zambia)	Livingstone - Kazungula - Sesheke - Senanga - Mongu	508 km
M11 road (Zambia)	Choma - Namwala	169 km
M12 road (Zambia)	Chipata - Lundazi	180 km
M13 road (Zambia)	Chipili - Kawambwa	88 km
M14 road (Zambia)	Nakonde - Malawi (Chitipa) & Malawi (Chisenga) - Thendere - Muyombe - Malawi (Katumbi)	
M15 road (Zambia)	Chirundu - Siavonga - Zimbabwe	65 km
M16 road (Zambia)	Kalulushi - Sabina	14 km
M18 road (Zambia)	Kalulushi - Lufwanyama - Kawana	251 km
M19 road (Zambia)	Kazungula - Botswana	3 km
M20 road (Zambia)	Landless Corner - Mumbwa	120 km

== See also ==
- Road Transport and Safety Agency
