= M18 road (Zambia) =

Road in Zambia

M18 Road

Route information
- Length: 260 km (160 mi)

Major junctions
- East end: T3 in Kitwe
- M16 near Kalulushi
- West end: M8 near Kasempa

Location
- Country: Zambia

Highway system
- Transport in Zambia
← M16	→ M19

The M18 road is a road in Zambia that connects Kitwe in the Copperbelt Province with Kawana (near Kasempa) in the North-Western Province via Kalulushi and Lufwanyama. It is the only other road after the T5 road that connects the towns of the North-Western and Copperbelt provinces. The section from Kitwe to Kalulushi is designated as the M7 road while the route from Kalulushi westwards to Kasempa District is designated as the M18 road on Zambia's road network.

== M7 road ==
M7 Road

Route information
- Length: 15 km (9.3 mi)

Major junctions
- East end: T3 in Kitwe
- M18 near Kalulushi; M16 in Kalulushi
- West end: Kalulushi Central

Location
- Country: Zambia
- Provinces: Copperbelt
- Major cities: Kitwe, Kalulushi

Highway system
- Transport in Zambia
← M6	→ M8

The M7 begins in the commercial city centre of Kitwe, at a roundabout junction with the T3 road (Independence Avenue) from Chingola in the north-west and Ndola in the south-east. It begins by going westwards as Kanyanta Road up to the Mindolo Road junction, where it becomes Mindolo Road towards the north-west. At the second left turn, the M7 turns westwards and goes for 6 kilometres to reach a junction with the M18 road east of Kalulushi. From the M18 junction, the M7 goes westwards for another 6 kilometres, meeting the southern terminus of the M16 road (which connects north to Chambishi), to end in Kalulushi Central.

=== Route for trucks ===
In order for heavy vehicles coming from Ndola and Lusaka (using the T3 road) to avoid the Kitwe city centre and Kitwe's northern suburbs (which are busy commercial areas) on the way to DR Congo via Chingola, some trucks are advised to use the M7 road from Kitwe to Kalulushi, then the M16 road from Kalulushi to Chambishi, as an alternative route. Just before Chambishi, heavy vehicles rejoin the main road (T3) and proceed to Chingola.

== M18 road ==
M18 Road

Route information
- Length: 251 km (156 mi)

Major junctions
- East end: M7 near Kalulushi
- West end: M8 near Kasempa

Location
- Country: Zambia
- Provinces: Copperbelt, North-Western

Highway system
- Transport in Zambia
← M16	→ M19

From the M7 junction east of Kalulushi, the M18 starts by going southwards for a few metres before turning westwards to separate Kalulushi Central from Chibuluma in the southern part of the town, where it meets a road to Southdowns Airport. From Kalulushi, the M18 goes westwards for 245 kilometres, through the rural town of Lufwanyama, crossing into the North-Western Province, to reach its western terminus at a junction with the M8 road in the settlement named Kawana in Kasempa District (60 kilometres north of Kasempa), with the M8 providing access to the towns of Kasempa, Mufumbwe and Kabompo in the south and Solwezi in the north.

== See also ==
- Roads in Zambia
