= Kafubu River (Zambia) =

River in Zambia

Coordinates: 13°15′57″S 28°09′14″E

Kafubu River (center right)

Kafubu River is a river in the Copperbelt Province of Zambia. It starts in Ndola and it cuts through the city's main area westwards into the area in-between Levy Mwanawasa Stadium and Masala before turning southwards after Masala and continuing through the Luanshya and Masaiti districts to join the Kafue River.

== Stream ==
Its source is in Ndola, just north of the Ndola Boat Club (water reservoir) (south-east of the Chipulukusu neighbourhood). It forms the boundary between Ndola Central and the Itawa neighbourhood, heading westwards. After passing under the T3 road south of Ndola Golf Club, it forms the border between the Masala and Hillcrest suburbs, before forming the border between the Lubuto and Twapia suburbs of Ndola. Just after Twapia, the river goes southwards, becoming the Kafubu Dam, to leave Ndola District. After passing under the M6 road, the Kafubu River turns westwards and forms the border between Luanshya District and Masaiti District up to a point north-west of Masaiti Town.

It continues westwards, joined by the Kafulafuta River west of Masaiti Town. From the Kafulafuta River confluence, it forms the border between Masaiti District and Mpongwe District up to the point where Masaiti District, Mpongwe District and Lufwanyama District form a tri-border point, where it ends by forming a confluence with the Kafue River.
