= M16 road (Zambia) =

Road in the Copperbelt Province of Zambia

M16 Road

Route information
- Length: 13.7 km (8.5 mi)

Major junctions
- South end: M7 in Kalulushi
- North end: T3 near Kitwe

Location
- Country: Zambia
- Provinces: Copperbelt
- Major cities: Kalulushi

Highway system
- Transport in Zambia
← M15	→ M18

The M16 is a short 14-kilometre toll road in Kalulushi District, Copperbelt Province, Zambia that connects Kalulushi with Sabina (north-west of Kitwe).

It starts at a junction with the M7 road in Kalulushi (east of the town centre; 12 kilometres west of Kitwe) and goes northwards for 14 kilometres, through the Sabina Toll Plaza, to end at a junction with the T3 road at Sabina (15 kilometres north-west of the Kitwe city centre; 10 kilometres south-east of the Chambishi town centre).

This road is primarily used by heavy vehicles to avoid the northern parts of Kitwe. In order for heavy vehicles coming from Ndola and Lusaka (using the T3 road) to avoid the Kitwe City Centre and Kitwe's northern suburbs (which are busy commercial areas) on the way to DR Congo via Chingola, trucks are advised to use the M7 road from Kitwe to Kalulushi, then the M16 road from Kalulushi to Chambishi, as an alternative route. Just before Chambishi (at Sabina), heavy vehicles rejoin the main road (the T3) and proceed through Chingola to the DR Congo Border (Kasumbalesa).

== See also ==
- Roads in Zambia
