= Chambishi =

- Town
- Location in Zambia
- Coordinates: 12°43′00″S 28°04′0″E
- Country: Zambia
- Province: Copperbelt Province
- District: Kalulushi District
- Time zone: UTC+2 (CAT)

Chambishi is a town in Kalulushi District in the Copperbelt Province of Zambia. According to the 2021 Census its population stands at slightly above 11,000. It is located on the T3 road (Kitwe-Chingola Dual Carriageway) between the cities of Kitwe and Chingola.

It was re-established in 1963 as a company township for the mine workers of Chambishi Mine which was under Chibuluma Mine of Kalulushi. This was after an announcement by Sir Ronald Prain, Chairman of Roan Selection Trust, in May 1962 that the company was going to open up the Chambishi open pit-pit mine at a cost of 7.5 million British Pounds.

== Etymology ==
The name Chambishi comes from two Lamba words "Cha" and "mbishi". Cha means "belonging to" or "an area of" while "mbishi" is a Lamba word for a zebra. The area was home to larger herds of zebras a century ago. Therefore, Chambishi means a place of zebras.

== History ==
=== George Grey founder of Chambishi ===
Captain George Grey is credited to be the founder of Chambishi in 1899. He was a prospector for Tanganyika Concessions, a company formed by Robert Williams, a former associate of Cecil Rhodes.

The same year 1899 Grey visited a village in North-Western Zambia under Chief Kansanshi who showed him a nearby copper mine, to which Grey gave the chief's name.

Grey with four prospectors and 25 armed Africans, claimed the Chambishi, Nkana (Kitwe) and Kansanshi copper workings on the southern side of the border. He also played a major role in discovering major copper ore bodies in Katanga Province of the Democratic Republic of Congo.

He died in 1911 at the age of 45 in a Nairobi hospital, Kenya after two of his bullets failed to stop a charging lion on the Kapiti plains.

William Collier a prospector working for Sir Edmund Davies, pegged claims on the Luanshya Mine and Bwana Mkubwa deposits in 1902, making the year one of the important ones in the history of mining in Zambia.

The following year Collier pegged further claims around the ancient workings at Chambishi, where the peggings of an earlier prospector, George Grey in 1899, had been slightly off target.

=== Real impetus came after the First World War ===
After the First World War the demand for copper by the automobile and the electrical industries skyrocketed.

Another important development was the treatment of lower grade ores using the flotation method by Minerals Separation Limited of London. Copper sulphide ores in Northern Rhodesia became more attractive than oxide ores in Katanga. This is because the recovery of copper from the mine's ores improved from 50% to 90% . This last discovery changed the outlook for Zambia forever.

Through various agents, Cecil Rhodes, after whom Southern Rhodesia (Zimbabwe) and Northern Rhodesia (Zambia) were named, obtained mineral concession rights from Chiefs and as a result, claimed ownership of mineral right in Zambia; his company, the British South Africa Company, retained these until the independence of the country in 1964.

After realizing that mining was a labour and capital intensive operation, the BSAC decided to change the policy of granting prospecting licenses to individuals as it had done in the past, instead companies with sound financial means were invited to prospect over larger areas.

This prompted well financed concerns with technical expertise to come on board. Alfred Chester Beatty, a London-based mining financier whose holding company, Selection Trust Limited (Roan Antelope Mine, Chambishi, Mufulira and Bwana Mkubwa) provided some funds in 1920; and Sir Ernest Oppenheimer, founder of Anglo American Corporation (Nchanga, Nkana, Bankroft- Chililabombwe Mines), joined forces in 1924.

=== Chambishi develops ===
Though copper was discovered at Chambishi in 1899 and rediscovered in 1902, the mining camp was not born until 1927 when the board of Selection Trust Limited in London approved a development programme and drilling started.

In 1927, Chambishi's white total population was estimated to be around 50. The number of indigenous Lamba people was estimated to be above a couple of hundred. Chief Nkana was the senior traditional leader in the area.

Russell Johnson Parker was the first Mine Manager while Lewin Tucker took up a position of mine secretary in 1927. The chief assayer was Jerry Haynes who later worked as smelter superintendent at Mufulira Mine; and, among the geologists, Dr. Anton Grey, (chief geologist), Dr. David Donaldson, Jock Brown and Bill Garlick who was a replacement geologist for Dr. T.F. Andrews and a Mr. Heins who had drowned in Chibuluma.

Others who worked at Chambishi Mines in 1927 include, Phil Melville who was chief surveyor while E. P. Edwards worked as mining engineer. George Hornby, a contractor in charge of pitting was one of the Europeans who arrived early at Chambishi. Alabama Patton an American miner and Motoka Mukonkaus an African surveyor's assistant were also based there.

When Lewin Tucker arrived at Chambishi, drilling was being carried out and preparations for shaft sinking had reached an advanced stage.

The company built offices, workshops and houses for mine workers using Kimberly bricks. Chambishi also boasted of a couple of well stocked shops although most of the shopping was conducted at Nkana (Kitwe).

For recreational activities the residents in Chambishi played tennis, had an occasional dance and went for hunting trips at weekends. Even though Chambishi could not support a football team as the white population was small, it did however, had its own nine-hole golf course, which attracted golfers from all over the Copperbelt.

Phil Melville working as a chief surveyor at Chambishi made a unique revelation about the original road from Mufulira to Ndola. He said the road went first of all to Chambishi, then bypassed Nkana (Kitwe) by a few miles and continued to Luanshya and then went on to Ndola.

The linking of the three mines through this road most probably explains why Roan Selection Trust (RST) insisted that these mines (Mufulira, Bwana Mkubwa, Chambishi, Roan and Chibuluma) became part of the block.

=== The Great Depression ===
In the 1930s the situation changed completely when mines on the Copperbelt faced a series of production cuts owing to the global economic depression. Operations at Chambishi ground to a halt in 1932 and so were at Mufulira Mine. Only two mines Roan and Nkana, continued to operate at 30% capacity under a quota agreement reached by world's main producers.

== Mining ==
Chambishi is predominantly a mining town, with two of open pits mines at China’s Non Ferrous Africa Mining Corporation (NFCA) and the newly opened SINO Metals’ Mwambashi Mine. Apart from the underground mine at NFCA, another one has been opened at a place that used to be Nchanga Farms called South East Ore Body (SEOB) with an investment of $850 million. The Chinese Corporation has been described as generally successful and well managed.

A 2005 explosion at the Chinese-owned mining-explosives manufacturing plant in Chambishi killed 46 Zambian workers; the following year, protests in Chambishi over work conditions culminated in the shooting of at least five miners, allegedly by a Chinese manager.

It also has a couple of multimillion-dollar smelting plants- Chambishi Copper Smelter and Chambishi Metals.

SINO Metals has also opened up the Mwambashi Open Pit Mine in the southern part of the town and made a copper processing plant near Chambishi Metals.

The Food Reserve Agency's branch at Chambishi is one of the largest in country with a capacity to hold a considerable number of metric tonnes of agricultural produce.

== Transportation ==
=== Railway ===
It is linked by freight lines from Mufulira, Chingola, Kitwe and Chambishi Mine. The nearest passenger rail line is in Kitwe.

=== Road ===
The Kitwe/Chingola Dual Carriageway (T3 road) is the main highway that passes through Chambishi, going to Chingola in the north-west and Kitwe in the south-east. From Sabina (just south-east of Chambishi), the M4 road goes north-east to Mufulira and the Congo Pedicle while the M16 road goes south to Kalulushi.

=== Airport ===
The nearest two airports to Chambishi are Southdowns Airport in Kalulushi nearly 30 kilometres in the south-east, and Kasompe Airport located north-west in Chingola some 28 kilometres. Simon Mwansa Kapwepwe International Airport, formerly named Ndola Airport, is the nearby international airport 83 kilometres away in Ndola, the Copperbelt's provincial headquarters.

== Features in Chambishi ==
The town is home to Chambishi Football Club that play Division One in the Zambian Football League. It is also home to Chambishi (Blue Zebras) Rugby Club.

== Education ==
=== Government Schools ===
- Chambishi High School
- Twalubuka Secondary School

=== Basic Schools ===
- Chambishi Basic School
- Sitwe Basic School
- Twaiteka Basic School
- Tata wa Luse Basic School

=== Private Schools ===
- EDUTECH Academy
- PHINE Trust School
- Providence
- LAMELZA
- PENTASS CHRISTIAN SCHOOL
- RAYMOND INNOVATION HUB

== Health Care ==
=== State health care facilities ===
The state operates Chambishi Government Hospital, and Twaiteka and Sitwe Government clinics. All these healthy facilities use Kitwe Central Hospital in Kitwe as the referral hospital.

=== Mine’s Health Facilities ===
The mines use Chambishi Metals Mine Clinic and NFCA Mine Clinic for their respective workers. Miners at Chambishi Metals use as their referral Nchanga South Mine Hospital in Chingola while SINO ZAM in the city of Kitwe is used by most firms that have Chinese investment.

== Major Companies in Chambishi ==
1. Non Ferrous Africa Mining Company NFCA
2. Chambishi Copper Smelter CCS
3. Chambishi Metals
4. SINO Metals
5. BORO Mining
6. TONGYUAN formerly TLZ
7. 15 MCC Africa Construction
8. JCHX
9. ORICA
10. Nkana Water And Sewerage Company
11. Solar
12. Chambishi Multi Facility Economical Zone
13. ZNMEC

== Recent Development ==
The Zambian government introduced Multi-Facility Economic Zones (MFEZ) in order to enhance Zambia's competitiveness and industrialisation. The zones were initiated to foster an attractive business environment, promote exports, and enhance domestic trade.

To this end, Foreign and local companies have set up ventures at the newly constructed Chambishi Multi-Facility Economic Zone (CMFEC) on the Copperbelt.

The Zambia-China Economic and Trade Co-operation Zone (ZCCZ) has been mandated to spearhead the establishment.

Chambishi Copper Smelter, BOLO Mining, SINO Metals Leach Zambia, JCHX Mining Construction Zambia Limited, Fifteen MCC Africa Construction, REBA Industrial Co-operation are some of the major firms that have established operation at the facility.
