= Kalalangabo =

National Assembly constituency in Zambia

Kalalangabo is a constituency of the National Assembly of Zambia. It was created in 2026 by splitting Masaiti constituency. It covers the southern part of Masaiti District.

== List of MPs ==
| Election year | MP | Party |
|---|---|---|
| 2026 | Micheal Zondani Katambo | United Party for National Development |
