= Micheal Zondani Katambo =

Zambian politician

Micheal Zondani Jay Katambo

Member of the National Assembly for Masaiti
- In office 28 September 2011 – 15 May 2026
- Preceded by: Gladys Lundwe

Minister of Agriculture
- In office 14 February 2018 – 14 May 2021
- President: Edgar Lungu
- Preceded by: Dora Siliya
- Succeeded by: Reuben Mtolo Phiri

Minister of Fisheries and Livestock
- In office 29 September 2016 – 14 February 2018
- President: Edgar Lungu
- Preceded by: Greyford Monde
- Succeeded by: Kampamba Mulenga

Personal details
- Born: 16 September 1969 (age 56)
- Party: UPND (2026–present); PF (2015–2026); MMD (1991–2015)

Micheal Zondani Jay Katambo (born 16 September 1969) is a Zambia politician. He is the current member of the National Assembly for Kalalangabo. He was the Member of the National Assembly for Masaiti constituency from 2011 to 2026 and formerly served as the Minister of Fisheries and Livestock (September 2016 to February 2018) and as the Minister of Agriculture (February 2018 to May 2021) under the presidency of Edgar Lungu.

== Political Career ==
Katambo stood as the Movement for Multi-Party Democracy candidate in Masaiti constituency at the 2011 general election and was elected. In 2015, he switched his allegiance to the Patriotic Front and this resulted in a by-election in which he retained his seat.

At the 2016 general election, he retained his position as the Masaiti member of parliament and was appointed as the Minister of Fisheries and Livestock by President Edgar Lungu the following month. On 14 February 2018, he was appointed as the Minister of Agriculture by the president. At the 2021 general election, he retained his position as the Masaiti member of parliament as the Patriotic Front candidate.

On 29 March 2026, he switched his allegiance to the United Party for National Development (UPND). Ahead of the 2026 general election, Masaiti constituency was split into two constituencies, with one maintaining the name Masaiti and the other being named Kalalangabo. Micheal Katambo picked Kalalangabo as the constituency to stand for member of parliament, with him being adopted as the UPND candidate. Katambo won the 2026 election to become the member of parliament for Kalalangabo.
