= Bwana Mkubwa =

- Mining Settlement
- Location in Zambia
- Coordinates: 12°59′00″S 28°42′00″E
- Country: Zambia
- Province: Copperbelt Province
- District: Ndola District
- Established: 1902
- Elevation: 4,505 ft (1,373 m)

Population (2011)
  - Total: 118,464
- Time zone: UTC+2 (Central Africa Time)

Bwana Mkubwa (or Bwana M'kubwa; meaning "big chief"; or "great master") is a settlement and a mine in Copperbelt Province, Zambia. It is the oldest mine in Zambia's Copperbelt region. As a settlement with no municipal status, it became a locale due to the abundant copper deposits found in the area. Today, it is part of Ndola.

== Etymology ==
Several versions of the origin of the name have been given. Mostly likely, William Collier and Jack Donohoe, who were led to the ancient workings, named the mining area "Bwana Mkubwa" after Francis Emilius Fletcher Jones, Native Commissioner, who was known to the locals as the 'Bwana Mkubwa'.

== Geography ==
Bwana Mkubwa is located at the southern extension of the Zambian Copperbelt, east of the T3 Highway. The city centre of Ndola is 10 kilometres (6.2 mi) to the northwest. It is in the Bwana Mkubwa Protected Forest Area at an elevation of 1,373 metres (4,505 ft).

== Politics ==
The town, together with most areas of Ndola south of the Kafubu River, is represented in the National Assembly by the Bwana Mkubwa constituency.

== Demographics ==
During the post World War I years, in 1928, Bwana Mkubwa contained the Baluba, Chambishi, Chibuluma, Mindola, Mufulira, Nkana, and Roan Antelope mining properties. In 1929, Bwana Mkubwa Copper Mining Company had proposed layouts for a public township. However, by 1931, there was limited progress on it and a final proposal was rejected chiefly due to worries of lesser profits if there were local government taxation.

Bwana Mkumbwa was one of the main camps used to receive thousands of Polish refugees that arrived in Northern Rhodesia during World War II. The Rhokana Corporation leased land to the Northern Rhodesian government for a camp under the command of the British army. At the end of the war in 1945, the refugees were able to remain or immigrate elsewhere. The Polish World War II Memorial was erected at Bwana Mkubwa in their honor.

From administration and electoral considerations, as a result of the reported population of 118,464 in Bwana Mkubwa, the City Council of Ndola has proposed delimitation of the Bwana Mkubwa and also Ndola Central into two separate constituencies each. According to the guidelines for determining whether or not a constituency could be divided, a constituency should have on average at least a population of 57,700. The proposal was mooted during the meeting of the Electoral Commission of Zambia (ECZ) on delimitation public discussion held in March 2011. Still, the Bwana Mkubwa community participates in projects such as malaria prevention, school facility upgrades, sewage and potable water system improvements, as well as wildlife conservation.

== History ==
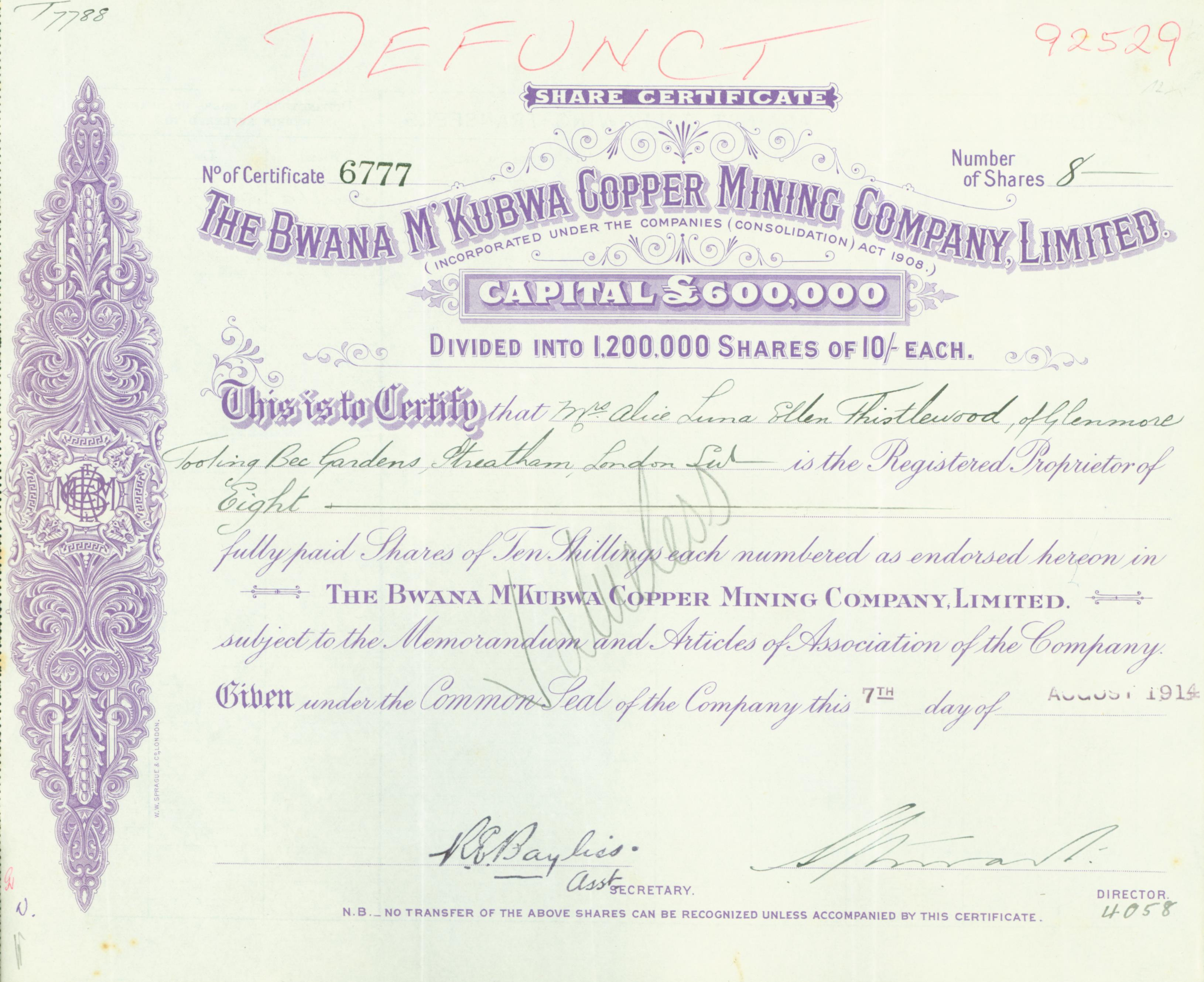
Share of the Bwana M'Kubwa Copper Mining Company, Ltd., issued 7 August 1914

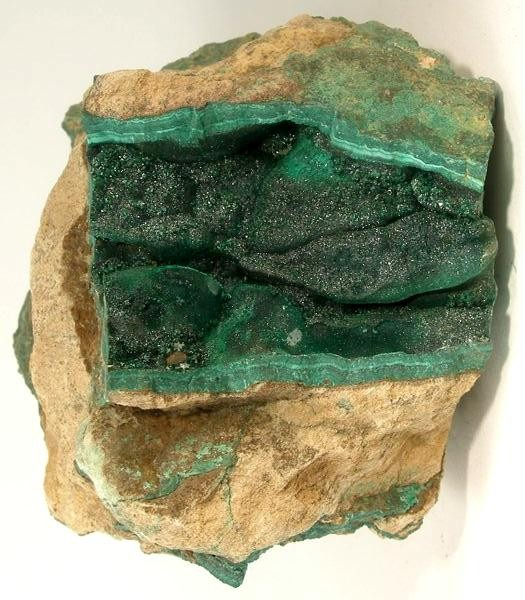
Malachite from open-cast mine in Bwana Mkubwa

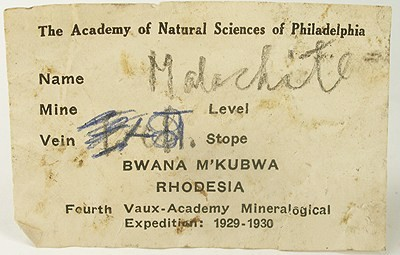
Citation of location of the sample of Malachite found in open cast mine in Bwana Mkubwa

Early years

The copper ore workings at Bwana Mkubwa are ancient. There is historical evidence of the mining operations conducted as early as the fourteenth or fifteenth centuries and also in subsequent centuries in Bwana Mkubwa and other Copperbelt areas such as Kansanshi and Kipushi, which aroused the interest of mining explorers from Europe.

Opened in 1902, Bwana Mkubwa is the oldest mine in the Copperbelt region of Zambia. It was discovered by the Rhodesia Copper company. The Bwana Mkubwa Copper Mining Company, registered in London, formed in 1910. In 1916, the Susman brothers offered their Nkana copper claims to Bwana Mkubwa but the offer was rejected.

Following the end of World War I, in 1918 the Bwana Mkubwa Copper Mining Company embarked on a massive programme of investigating the possibility of extracting copper from low grade ores using a flotation process. For this purpose, they engaged Mineral Separation Agency, a London-based firm, a specialized agency in this field with many patents to their credit on the subject. What ensued was installation of a new processing technique known as "Perkins Process" for handling low grade copper (4.25% copper) with capacity to handle 1000 tons of ore per day; the estimated copper reserve was 3.7 million tons. The work started from 1922. However, the extraction process, other techniques adopted for assessment of copper percentage from the ore using substituted samples of malachite (which did not exist in investigated locations) proved disastrous to the company which suffered losses in the initial years of processing. Eventually this resulted in closure of the mines in April 1931. The company was sold to "The Rhodesian Congo Border Concession Ltd.", and which came under the control of Rhokhana Corporation. It investigated better sites in the Copperbelt from 1952 onwards which resulted in the Bwana Mkubwa getting into prominence as a copper mining area.

20th century

Bwana Mkubwa was recapitalized in 1922 on the strength of a series of experiments made on the ore by Minerals Separation Ltd, In the late 1920s Ernest Oppenheimer prevented the Americans from dominating the Northern Rhodesian mining industry. In the 1950s people casualties were taken to Bwana Mkubwa for medical treatment. The copper processing plant was built in 1998, at a cost of approximately $30 million. It was originally constructed as a five-year life short-term plant with a capacity of 10,000 tonnes/year of finished copper.

2000s

In 2002, the mining facility was expanded and the mine produced of 11,878 tonnes of copper cathode as well as 88,198 tonnes of sulphuric acid. The Bwana Mkubwa SX-EW plant reportedly posted a 77% decrease in output to 5851 tonnes of copper cathode in 2008 from 25402 tonnes in 2007.

In October 2008, operations were suspended and the plant was placed on care and maintenance. The closure of the mine had a negative social and economic impact socially on 400 employees. In January 2010, First Quantum Minerals (FQM) restarted the Bwana Mkubwa's copper SX/EW (solvent extraction and electrowinning) plant to process stockpiled ore from the depleted Lonshi mine in the Democratic Republic of Congo. This was as a result of reopening of the border between Zambia and Congo. FQM has also initiated action to finding additional sites to feed its processing plants. In 2010, they anticipated that their new operations would result in a production of about 800 tons of copper cathodes per month. The original tailings facility of the plant was founded to process is long since exhausted. However, by August 2010, FQM announced it had run out of raw materials and would be closing the mine.

While pursuing suitable additional sites for feeding its copper processing plants, FQM's operations at the Bwana Mkubwa plant using solvent extraction and electrowinning (SX/EW) processing plant began with a positive note of anticipated production of about 800 tonnes of copper cathode per month, till end of 2010. This was as a result of recent re-opening of the border between the Zambia and Congo, which enabled the company to process the stockpiled ores from the Lonshi open pit mine in Congo.
