= KIW =

KIW or kiw may refer to:

- KIW, the IATA code for Southdowns Airport, Copperbelt Province, Zambia
- kiw, the ISO 639-3 code for Northeast Kiwai language, Papua New Guinea
