= Masaiti =

Masaiti may refer to:

- Masaiti District, a district of Zambia, located in Copperbelt Province
- Masaiti (constituency), a constituency of the National Assembly of Zambia
- Evelyn Masaiti, Zimbabwean politician
