= Southdowns Airport =

- IATA: KIW; ICAO: FLSO

Summary
- Airport type: Public
- Operator: Government
- Serves: Kalulushi, Kitwe, Chambishi
- Location: Kalulushi, Copperbelt Province, Zambia
- Elevation AMSL: 4,145 ft (1,263 m)
- Coordinates: 12°54′01″S 28°08′59″E
- Website: Zambia Airports Corp.

Map
- Location of airport in Zambia (Copperbelt Province in red)

Runways
Direction	Length		Surface
Direction	m	ft	Surface
11/29	2,015	6,611	Asphalt
- Sources: SkyVector GCM Google Maps

Southdowns Airport (IATA: KIW, ICAO: FLSO) is an airport serving Kitwe, a city in the Copperbelt Province in Zambia. The airport is located in Kalulushi District, in the countryside 9 kilometres (5.6 mi) southwest of Kitwe and 5 kilometres (3.1 mi) south-east of Kalulushi.

The Ndola VOR-DME (Ident: VND) is located 30.8 nautical miles (57.0 km) east of the airport. The Southdowns non-directional beacon (Ident: KT) is located on the field.

In December 2022, the Zambia Air Force stated that they want to take over administration of Southdowns Airport. As of April 2024, the government of Zambia has agreed to transform Southdowns Airport into a military base, therefore transferring the management responsibilities from Zambia Airports Corporation Limited to the Zambia Air Force.

== See also ==
- Transport in Zambia
- List of airports in Zambia
