= Masaiti (constituency) =

Constituency of the National Assembly of Zambia

Masaiti is a constituency of the National Assembly of Zambia. It covers the north-western part of Masaiti District in Copperbelt Province, including the towns of Lumano, Masaiti and Masangano.

== List of MPs ==
Election year	MP	Party
1973	Emmanuel Chimbamanaga	United National Independence Party
1978	Dawson Lupunga	United National Independence Party
1983	Dawson Lupunga	United National Independence Party
1988	George Mpombo	United National Independence Party
1991	Yona Chilele	Movement for Multi-Party Democracy
1996	Jazzman Chikwakwa	Movement for Multi-Party Democracy
2001	Marina Nsingo	Movement for Multi-Party Democracy
2006	Gladys Lundwe	Movement for Multi-Party Democracy
2011	Micheal Zondani Katambo	Movement for Multi-Party Democracy
2015 (by-election)	Micheal Zondani Katambo	Patriotic Front
2016	Micheal Zondani Katambo	Patriotic Front
2021	Micheal Zondani Katambo	Patriotic Front
2026	Shevy Mukabila	United Party for National Development
