= Mpongwe District =

Coordinates: 13°33′S 27°42′E

- District
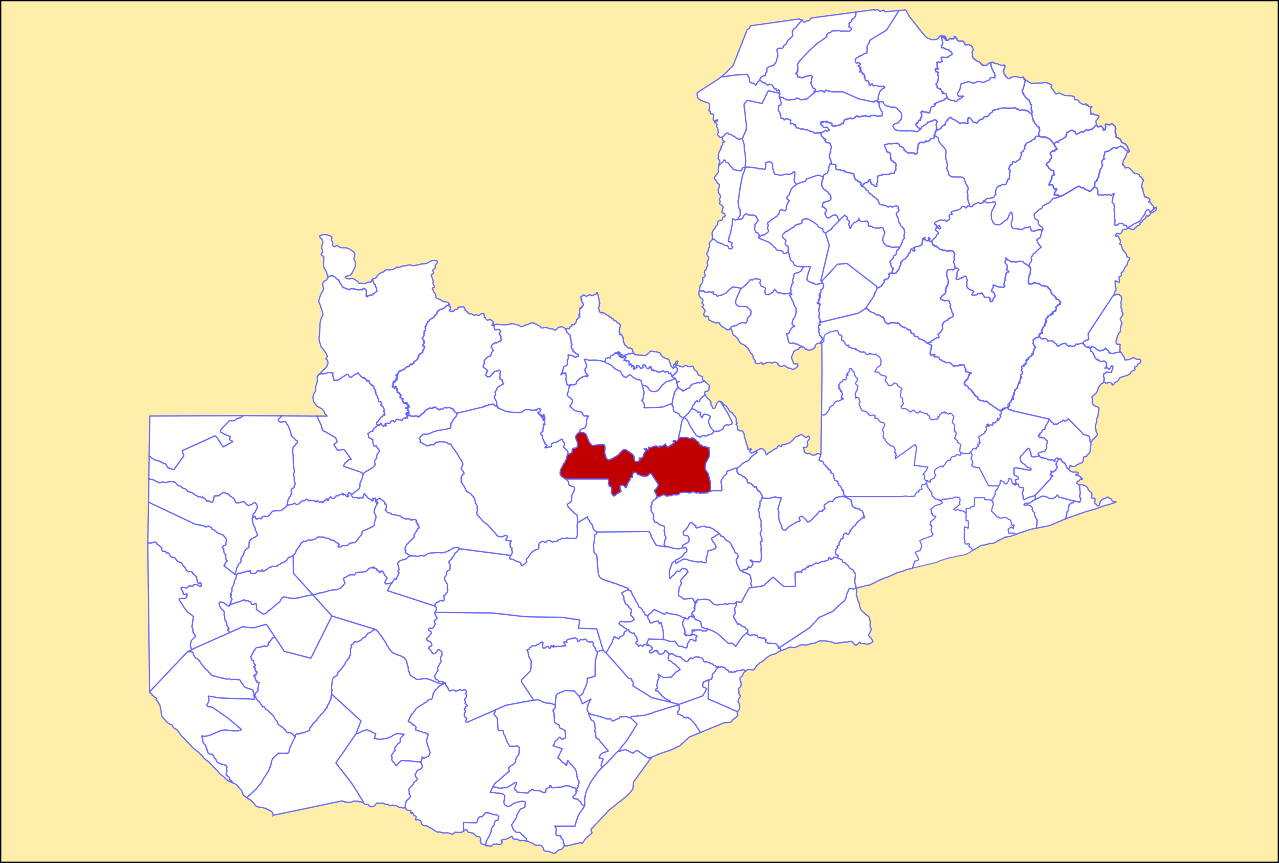
- District location in Zambia
- Country: Zambia
- Province: Copperbelt Province
- Capital: Mpongwe

Area
  - Total: 8,388.7 km^{2} (3,238.9 sq mi)

Population (2022)
  - Total: 135,486
  - Density: 16.151/km^{2} (41.831/sq mi)
- Time zone: UTC+2 (CAT)

Mpongwe District is a district of Zambia, located in Copperbelt Province. The capital lies at Mpongwe. As of the 2022 Zambian Census, the district had a population of 135,486 people.

It neighbours Lufwanyama District and Masaiti District. At one time, before 1997, these three districts were known as 'Ndola Rural'.

== Geography ==
The district is located approximately 60 kilometers south-west of Ndola, the capital of Copperbelt Province, and about 260 kilometers north of Lusaka. Its elevation in the north is approximately 1,300 meters, and in the south, approximately 1,200 meters above sea level. A large portion of its southern border is formed by the Kafue and Lusiwishi rivers, as is part of its northern border.

The district borders Lufwanyama District to the north, Masaiti District to the east, Kapiri Mposhi and Ngabwe Districts in Central Province to the south, and Kasempa and Solwezi Districts in North-Western Province to the west.

Besides the Kafue and Luswishi rivers, the Kafulafuta, Lukanga and Mpongwe rivers are also of great importance. There are also lakes such as the Kashiba and the Nampamba.

== Infrastructure ==
Numerous schools have been built in all six chiefdoms of the district. By 2015, five new projects for the construction of clinics, schools, and teachers' houses had been completed.
