= List of shopping centres in Zambia =

This is a list of shopping centres in Zambia with at least two anchor tenants such as supermarkets, hypermarkets, multicinemas, and department stores. Modern shopping centres are often called malls, even when they do not meet the definition of a mall (min. 300,000 square feet (28,000 m^{2}) by the smallest definition, for Canada) by the International Council of Shopping Centers.

| City | Name | Gross Leasable Area in sq. m. | Anchors |
|---|---|---|---|
| Lusaka | Manda Hill Shopping Mall | 43,000 m^{2} (460,000 ft^{2}) | Game, Shoprite, Mr Price, Woolworths, Ster-Kinekor cinema, Ackermans, Pep, Truworths |
| Lusaka | EastPark Shopping Mall | 34,000 m^{2} (370,000 sq ft) | Toys R Us, Food Lovers Market, Pick n Pay, Shoprite, Builders Warehouse |
| Kitwe | Mukuba Mall | 28,236 m^{2} (303,930 ft^{2}) | Shoprite, Game, Pick n Pay, Woolworths |
| Lusaka | Levy Junction Mall | 28,000 m^{2} (300,000 ft^{2}) | Woolworths, Edgars, Truworths, Mr Price, Food Lovers Market, Pick n Pay |
| Lusaka | Cosmopolitan Mall | 25,799 m^{2} (277,700 ft^{2}) | Game, Shoprite, Pep, Jet, Ackermans, Truworths, Edgars, Mr Price, Woolworths |
| Lusaka | Arcades Shopping Centre | 18,382 m^{2} (197,860 ft^{2}) | No anchor, but included in the list because it was one of the first modern shopping centres. |
| Lusaka | Kabulonga Centro Mall | 7,000 m^{2} (75,000 ft^{2}) | Pick n Pay, Mr Price, Woolworths |
