= Lufwanyama =

- Town
- Location in Zambia
- Coordinates: 12°51′33″S 27°37′01″E
- Country: Zambia
- Province: Copperbelt Province
- District: Lufwanyama District
- Elevation: 4,016 ft (1,224 m)

Population (2010)
  - Total: 3,240

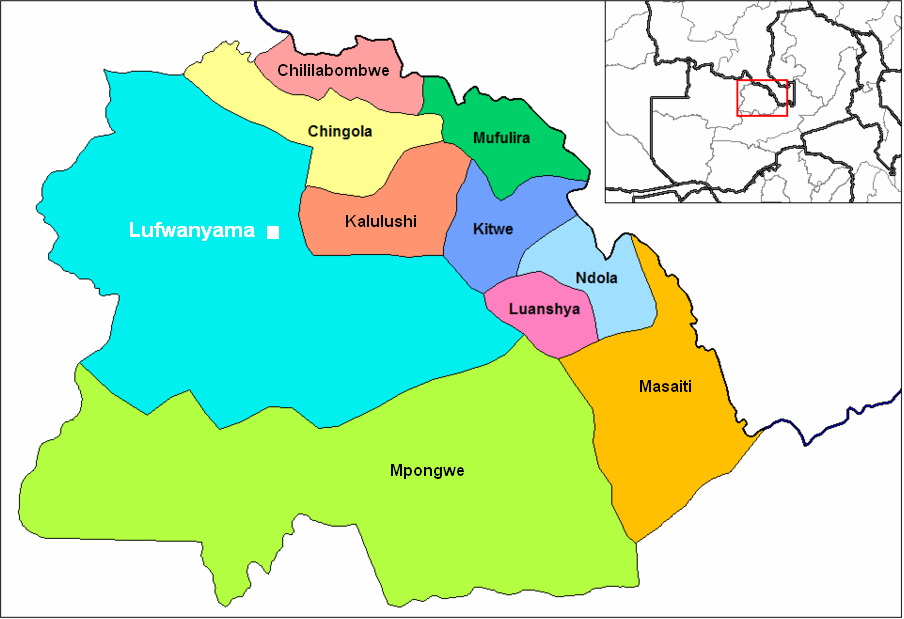
Location of Lufwanyama town and district in Copperbelt Province, Zambia

Lufwanyama is a small town on the M18 road in the Copperbelt Province of Zambia.

== Location ==
The town lies in Lufwanyama District in the Copperbelt Province. This location lies approximately 105 kilometres (65 mi), by road, west of Kitwe, Zambia's second-largest city, by population. The town lies close to the Lufwanyama River which flows from north to south, about 70 kilometres (43 mi) west of Kitwe and enters the Kafue River. Lufwanyama sits at an average elevation of 1,224 metres (4,016 ft), above sea level.

== Overview ==
Despite being only 65 miles (105 km), by road, west of the most urban and industrialised part of the country, the mining cities of the Copperbelt, Lufwanyama is underdeveloped and lacks infrastructure such as electricity, all-weather roads and hospitals. Zambia National Commercial Bank, the largest financial services provider in the country, by assets, maintains a branch in the town.

== Points of interest ==
The following points of interest lie within the town or close to its edges:

- The headquarters of Lufwanyama District Administration
- A branch of Zambia National Commercial Bank, the largest commercial bank in Zambia, based on assets.

== See also ==
- Copperbelt Province
