= Kitwe =

- City
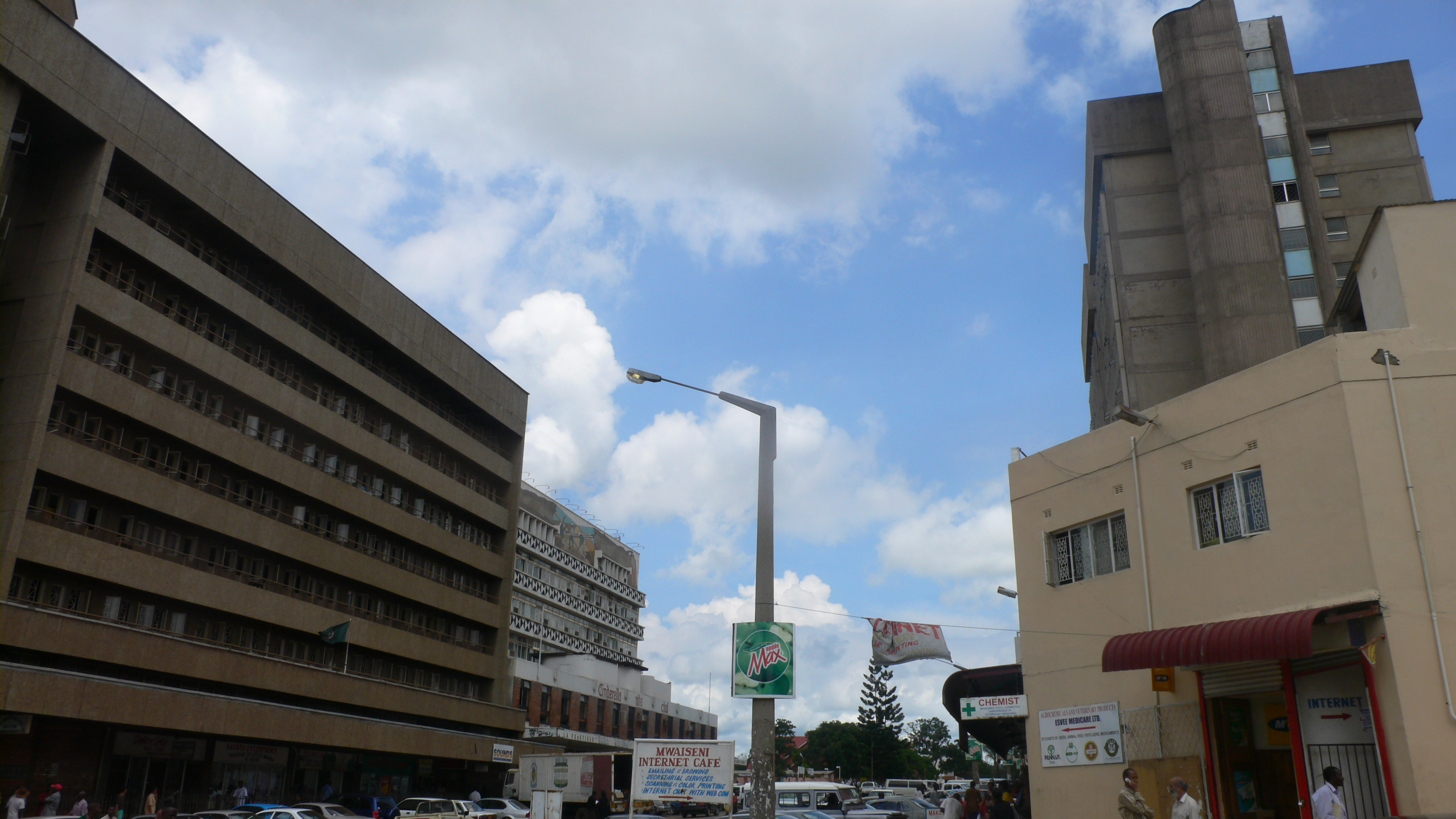
- View towards the City of Kitwe, Zambia

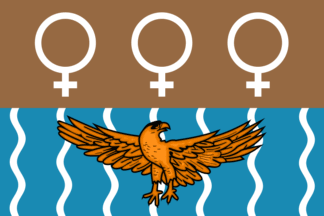
- Flag
- Motto: Lets Build Us A City
- Location in Zambia
- Coordinates: 12°49′S 28°12′E
- Country: Zambia
- Province: Copperbelt
- District: Kitwe

Government
  - Type: Mayor-council government
  - Mayor: Mpasa Mwaya

Population (2022)
  - Total: 661,901
- Demonym: Kitwean
- Time zone: UTC+2 (CAT)
- Area code: 0212
- HDI (2019): 0.658; Medium
- Website: Kitwe City Council

Kitwe is the third largest city in terms of infrastructure development (after Lusaka and Ndola) and second largest city in terms of size and population (after Lusaka) in Zambia. With a population of 661,901 as of the 2022 census, Kitwe is one of the most developed commercial and industrial areas in the nation, alongside Ndola and Lusaka. It has a complex of mines on its north-western and western edges.

Kitwe is located in the Copperbelt Province and is made up of townships and suburban areas including Parklands, Riverside, Buchi, Chimwemwe, Kwacha, Nkana East, Nkana West, Garneton, Ndeke, Miseshi, Wusakile, Mindolo, Chachacha and Race Course, to mention a few. The city is sometimes referred to as Kitwe-Nkana. Nkana is derived from the name of Senior Chief Nkana of the Lamba speaking people of the Copperbelt Province. His area covers the towns of Kitwe, Mufulira, Kalulushi and Chambishi.

Kitwe has both private and public schools which include Lechwe School, Mpelembe Secondary School, Kitwe Boys Secondary School, Parklands Secondary School, Mukuba Secondary School, Nkana Trust School and Helen Kaunda Secondary School. It is also home to Zambia's second highest learning institution, namely The Copperbelt University.

== History ==
Kitwe was founded in 1936 in north-central Zambia as the railway was being built by Cecil Rhodes' company. It was first established as an adjunct, non-mining-related but supportive part of an expanding copper-mining centre at Nkana. The expanding copper mines at Nkana made it the dominant centre in the region and Kitwe started building up its size and significance over the years, finally surpassing Nkana as the main centre. The Rhodesia Railways main line reached the town in 1937, providing passenger services as far south as Bulawayo in today's Zimbabwe, with connections to Cape Town in today's South Africa. A branch line was created from Ndola into DR Congo, and from there eventually linked to the Benguela Railway to the Atlantic port of Lobito in Angola, which used to take some of Zambia's copper exports.

With the upsurge of copper prices in the 1950s Kitwe developed from a small township to the second largest city in Zambia, obtaining city status in 1966. It then developed as an industrial and commercial area and later an important agricultural area.

== Mining ==
Kitwe is the base for a number of mining operations including the Mopani Copper Mines. Kitwe has rich copper, cobalt and emerald deposits among other minerals. It is home to Mopani Copper Mine's Nkana Cobalt Plant, one of Africa's largest mines. The mine is located 1 kilometre southwest of the Kitwe city centre. Nkana cobalt mine is the deepest mine on the Zambian Copperbelt. It has two shafts below 1,300 meters and three open pits. The plant treats cobalt concentrates to produce high purity cobalt metal. At Nkana, copper and cobalt ore is produced from five sources: four underground mines namely, Mindola North Shaft, Mindola Sub Vertical Shaft, Central Shaft, South Ore Body (SOB) Shaft and open pits dotted across the Nkana Oxide Cap.

The following is a list of Mining Companies in Kitwe (as of 2019),

- Mopani Copper Mines Nkana Cobalt Plant
- Konkola Copper Mines Copper Refining Plant
- EC Mining
- Grizzly Mining
- Kagem Mining Ltd
- African Mining Consultants
- Sandvik Mining
- AAC Mining Executors Ltd

== Communications ==
=== Railway ===
Kitwe lies at the end of Zambia Railways passenger services from Livingstone, Lusaka and Ndola, but freight lines continue to the mining towns to the north-west (Chingola and Chililabombwe) and north (Mufulira).

=== Road ===
The main highway through the Copperbelt (the T3 highway) runs south-east to north-west through the city, to Ndola (as a dual carriageway) in the south-east, and to Chingola (as a dual carriageway) and Chililabombwe in the north-west. A laterite road (the M7 road) goes west to Kalulushi and Kasempa. The M4 road connects Sabina (just north-west of Kitwe) with Mufulira and the Congo Pedicle to the north.

=== Airport ===
Southdowns Airport lies about 12 km south-west of the city but does not receive any scheduled services. As of April 2024, there are plans by the government of Zambia to transform Southdowns Airport into a military base, therefore transferring the management responsibilities from Zambia Airports Corporation Limited to the Zambian Air Force.

Ndola Airport is 50 km to the south-east and services regular commercial flights from Lusaka, Addis Ababa, Nairobi, and Johannesburg.

== Education ==
=== Schools ===
A student and teacher exchange programme was introduced in 1999 with teacher exchange visits by Kingsmead Community School in Wiveliscombe, England with two Kitwe schools – Helen Kaunda High School and Mukuba High School. This started a series of partnerships between Zambian schools such as Chamboli, Mukuba, Ndeke Secondary, Wusakile Secondary, Ndeke Basic, Kitwe Boys, Kitwe Basic, Wesely Nyerenda, Fatima, Nkana High, etc. and UK schools, and there are now over 30 such school partnerships. Students from Kingsmead paid a visit to the Kitwe schools in 2005. Kitwe has a number of private schools, six being:

Kitwe International School is a privately owned international school with a campus in Nkana West at plot 10, 9th Avenue, off Boma Street. It offers quality tuition in sciences and arts. It also offers tuition for degree programs especially to students studying by distance. It offers consultancy services in project proposals and dissertation writeup. The school became operational on 1 June 2012.

Lechwe School is one of the biggest schools in the city. An international school, it provides pre-school, primary, secondary, and advanced level teaching following a Cambridge curriculum. Lechwe school is a multi-cultural school, hence there is not much religious teaching but a large number of subject options in secondary and advanced level schooling. The school is known for having a good disciplinary policy and a number of extracurricular activities like chess, table tennis, volleyball, basketball, tennis, squash, rugby, hockey, football, cricket, athletics, swimming, softball, netball, handball, baseball, rounders, a Duke of Edinburgh program, and martial arts. Lechwe school is known for its students' abilities: swimmer Ellen Hight represented Zambia at the 2000 Summer Olympics, swimmers Andre and Ursula Kuenzli represented Zambia in the Commonwealth Games in England in July 2002, Jacob Mulenga main striker of the Zambian Football Team, and swimmer Jade Howard represented Zambia in the FINA World Championship. Eppa Tembo, a chess player, represented Zambia in 2008 World Championship.

Mpelembe Secondary School is one of the biggest secondary schools in the city and a preeminent secondary school. It offers Zambian Standard syllabus and Cambridge curriculum. Being one of the top 5 best schools in Zambia, Mpelembe has a highly selective admissions at both eighth and tenth grade entry levels. Each year, there are thousands of applicants and only about one hundred and fifty students are enrolled. Mpelembe has an A level program under the Cambridge Local Examination Syndicate. Students who meet the grades go on to study at universities in the UK, US, Canada, South Africa and other developed countries. The most popular Universities for Mpelembe Students are University of Manchester, Birmingham, UMIST, Imperial college, Leeds University. Camborne School of Mines is the default college for Mining Engineering students. Mpelembe has produced some of the best students at grade nine and twelve levels with some among the top two in the nation. The former students have an association known as MESA [Mpelembe Ex-Students Association] which has been sponsoring deserving students to do grade 10–12 at the school. Ex-Mpelembe students are scattered all over the world working for various organisations ranging from Government departments to Google.

Nkana Trust School is a trust school that provides pre-school, primary, and secondary school education. It offers the Zambian syllabus. Nkana Trust School is known for having one of the best sports and education facilities in the city and the country as a whole. Nkana trust school students produce best results in Grade 7 composite final examinations and Grade 10 and 12 final examinations. Nkana trust formally called Kitana trust has produced notable names such as Zambia's king of comedy and film director Bob Nkosha.

Elim Primary School is a small school that provides pre-school and primary school following a Zambian Standard syllabus (mainly Macmillan and Longman), and provides the basic facilities in swimming and athletics four times a week. Despite its small size, it produces one of the nation's best Grade 7 composite examination.

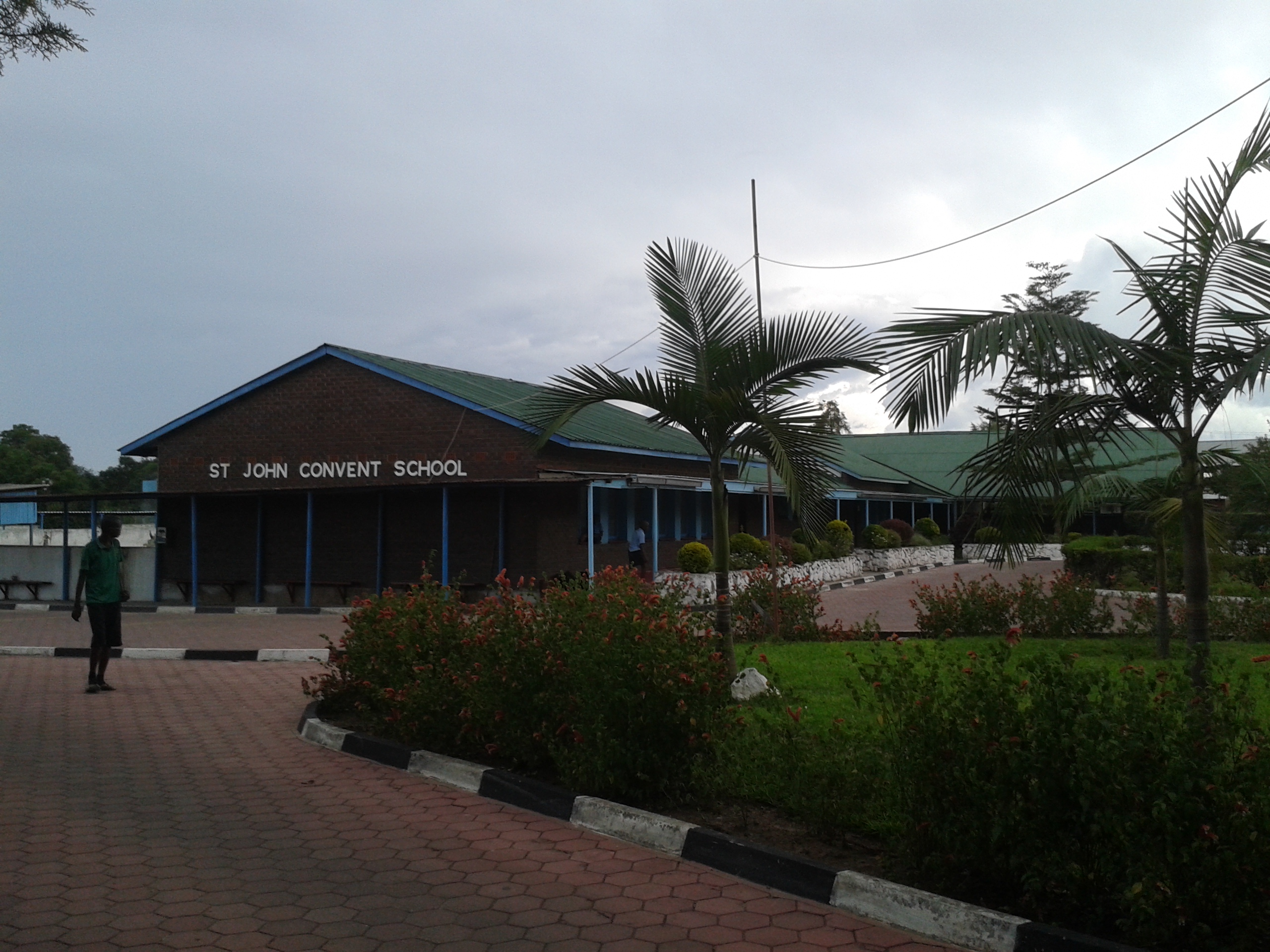
St John's Convent Catholic School in Kitwe.

St. Johns Convent School is one of the largest Catholic schools in the province, a convent school that provides pre-school, primary and secondary teaching following a Zambian syllabus and providing some facilities such as athletics, swimming, basketball, rugby, football, chess, and softball. The school was founded and is run by the Sisters of John the Baptist (the Baptistines).

Kawama Pentecostal Holiness School (not to be confused with Kawama School in Kamitondo) is currently under construction by Cranleigh School in partnership with a UK charity, Beyond Ourselves. The school is located in the suburbs of Kitwe in the deprived area of Kawama. In August 2011, 17 past and present students of Cranleigh School spent two weeks laying the blocks of the 4 classroom building located adjacent to the current church building. Another Cranleigh School trip is planned for October 2011 with the aim of completing the school building and opening the new school to the 210 students (who currently all study in the single-room church building) in January 2012.

The construction work has been funded largely by the money raised in a Sponsored Walk held during the Summer of 2010 and marks the start of a long-term relationship between Cranleigh and Kawama School over the coming years. Cranleigh School is now working to develop the Child Sponsorship Programme at Kawama which will provide a salary for the staff (allowing them to complete their teaching qualifications) plus a lunch time meal and school uniform for every child. The feeding programme which provides a meal is particularly important as it not only provides employment for local women in the kitchen, but vitally it means that the children are receiving at least one square meal per day. In a region where the HIV/AIDS rate is very high, and many children are on ARV's (antiretroviral drugs), being adequately nourished is essential for this medication to work effectively.

Cranleigh School is now actively seeking to sponsor every child attending Kawama School. This is through direct appeals to parents, and through campaigns in each boarding house, who are using ingenious ways to raise the necessary funds.

Kitwe has a mining school, Konkola Trust School, that trains miners in the Copperbelt; and a flying club that trains pilots near the Showgrounds. The flying club is housed in the area that was occupied by the former Kitwe airport.

=== Universities, Colleges and Institutes ===
Kitwe has three universities:

CBU (Copperbelt University) is a public university that was initially the Zambia Institute of Technology (ZIT), then part of UNZA (University of Zambia) (oddly, as University of Zambia, Ndola campus, "UNZANDO"). It was separated and established as an independent institution in 1987. It is one of the biggest universities in the country as it has over 11,000 students and over 1,200 members of staff. The university is organised under a lifelong education directorate and ten schools namely:

- School of Built Environment
- School of Business
- School of Engineering
- Dag Hammarskjöld Institute of Peace and Conflict Studies
- School of Mathematics and Natural Sciences
- School of Medicine
- School of Communication, Information, and Technology
- School of Natural Resources
- Distance Education
- Graduate Studies

Copperstone University a privately owned university, located in the adjacent Luanshya District on the Ndola-Kitwe Dual Carriageway.

Zambia Catholic University a private university owned and run by the Zambia Episcopal Conference is located in Kalulushi, 15.2 km (15 minutes drive) from the city of Kitwe.

Mukuba University formerly known as Copperbelt Secondary Teachers' College (cosetco), has had the important specialized function of training teachers of Science, Mathematics and Home Economics for the nation's secondary schools, a task it has performed since it was first opened by the Ministry of Education in 1974.

The city is also home to many colleges and institutes.

- KCE (Kitwe College of Education) opened in 1935 – formerly called KTTC (Kitwe Teachers' Training College) – The largest Primary teachers' College in Zambia. Currently, It offers certificates in Primary and Pre-school teachers' education. From 2011 it will start offering diploma courses in primary teachers Education.
- ZIBSIP (Zambia Institute of Business Studies and Industrial Practice) — an institute that provides business courses.
- Kitwe Community Development Staff Training College — a government institution, officially opened in September 1966, that provides training in community development.

=== Mindolo Ecumenical Foundation ===
The Mindolo Ecumenical Foundation, founded in 1958, in Mindolo Township, Kitwe. Mindolo is an interdenominational center that serves as a place of worship, study, consultation and reconciliation.

The campus includes:

- DMI-St. Eugene University, Kitwe centre.*
- Africa Literature Center
- Young Women's Christian Association
- United Church of Zambia Theological College
- Theological Education by Extension in Zambia (TEEZ)
- St. John's Anglican Seminary
- A peace training programme called "The Dag Hammarskjöld 'Messengers of Peace' Training Programme"
- It used to host the "Africa Literature Centre (ALC)" a journalism school co-sponsored by churches that drew its students across African countries and the Americas. It was established in 1958, under the name All Africa Christian Literature Centre, as a pan-African institution specializing in the training of African journalists, writers and artists. Currently widely known as Africa Literature Centre for Art and Journalism Training and as Pan-African School for Journalism and Art, but closed in 1998 due to financial difficulties.

The Dag Hammarskjöld 'Messengers of Peace' Training Programme is run by the Foundation. The objectives of this bi-annual two-week training programme are:

- To spread information and knowledge of conflict resolution at different levels of society in Africa and the world;
- To promote a culture of peaceful conflict resolution among people.

In addition to this two-week training programme, the Mindolo Ecumenical Foundation (MEF), which executes the programme, offers a three-month Peace Certificate covering conflict analysis, conflict resolution, human rights, training of trainers, mediation skills, restorative justice and non-violent strategies. A nine-month Peace Certificate in conflict resolution, peace-building, computer training and democracy is also offered.

== Health care ==
Dentist surgeries include:

- Sinozam hospital
- Wusakile Mine Hospital
- Tejani's Surgery
- Esthetix

Other health facilities and Hospitals include:

- Wusakile Mine Hospital
- Royal Medical Centre
- Hillview Medical Centre
- Company Clinic
- Progress Hospital
- Kitwe Central Hospital
- Sinozam Hospital
- Lubambe Medical Centre
- Kitwe Polyclinic
- Ndeke Village Hospital

== Demographics ==
=== Population ===
According to the Kitwe City Council, Kitwe accounted for 24% of the population on the Copperbelt province as of 2019. The United Nations World Population Prospects estimated that the current metro area population of Kitwe in 2021 stood at 710,000 while the Zambia Statistics Agency had shown a higher figure of 738,320 as of 2019. The city hosts well over one quarter of the population of the Copperbelt province.

=== Religion ===
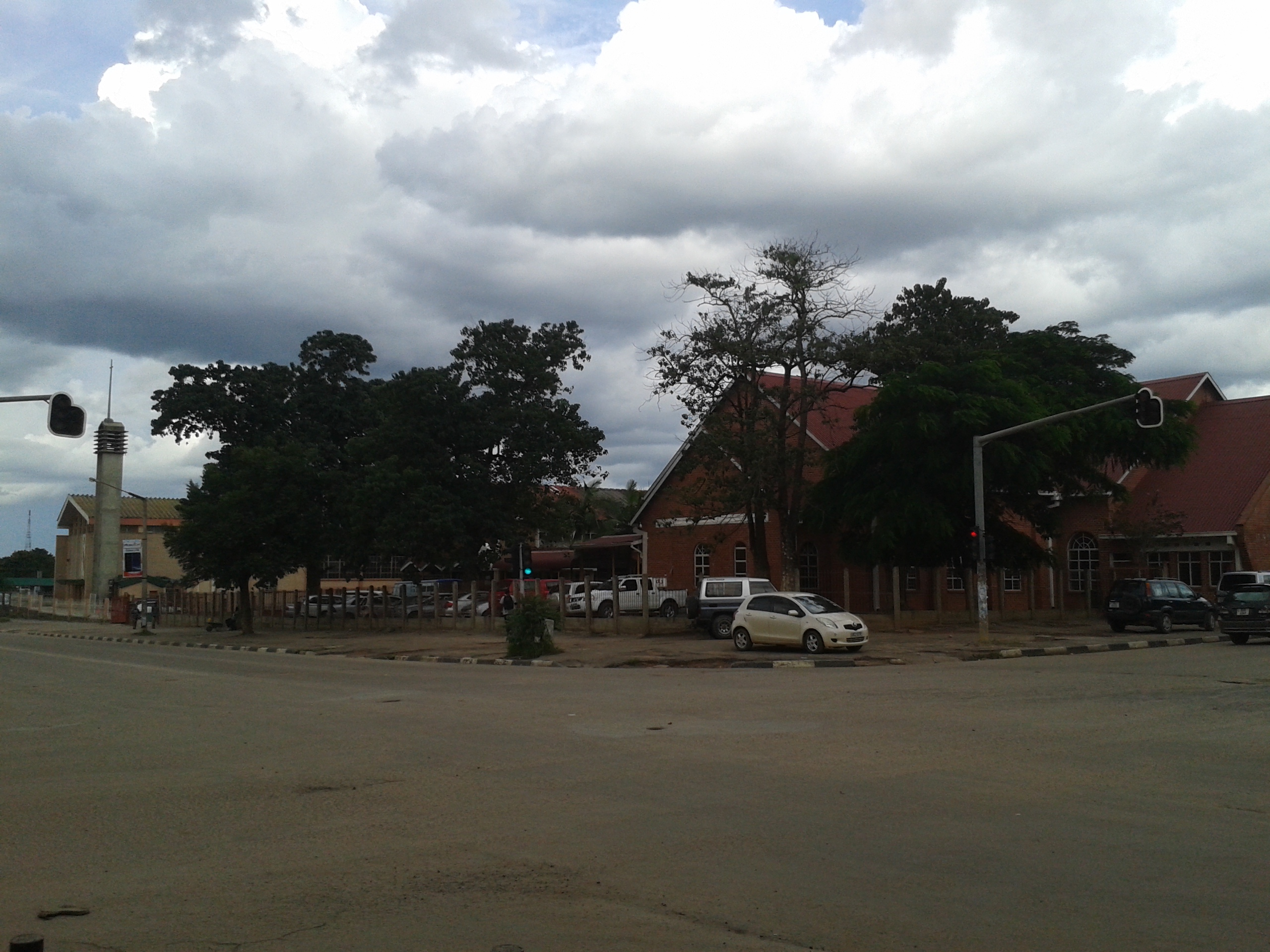
St Margaret's church of United Church in Zambia (right) and Catholic parish of Sacred Heart run by Conventual Franciscans (left), on the corner of Obote Avenue and Independence Avenue.

The majority of the population of Kitwe, about 98.5%, are Christians but there are some minority groups such as Muslims and Hindus. There are also some Sikhs, Jains and Jews.

Religion	Population	Percentage
Christians	538,995	98.5%
Muslims	7,400	1.4%
Other	600	0.6%

== Features of Kitwe ==
- Obote Ave Market: arts and crafts stalls, including copper craft items.
- Mindolo Ecumenical Foundation Campus
- Kitwe Central Hospital
- Nkana FC
- Nkana Golf Club
- Power Dynamos FC
- Kitwe United Football Club
- Arthur Davies Stadium
- Chisokone Market
- Nkana Mine
- Ek Park, a cricket ground which in 1962 played host to two first-class matches, which are to date the only first-class matches to have been played anywhere in Zambia.

== Around Kitwe ==
=== Sightseeing ===
The landscape around Kitwe is an attractive mix of gently undulating woodland, dambos, farmland and rivers such as the Kafue River flowing along Kitwe's eastern and southern edges.

- Mindolo Dam 7 km west of the city centre towards Kalulushi has a boating club, motocross racing track, canoeing, table tennis, a dam, a good field for picnicking, swimming pool and bar.
- Mwekwera Falls 9 km south east just off the Kitwe-Ndola road, with a small lake and fish farms. The falls are small but scenic with an attractive pool below.
- Chembe Bird Sanctuary 20 km west on the Kasempa Road has a small lake surrounded by woodland and is excellent for birdwatching, fishing, camping and picnics. The shady lake shore has campsites with a communal amenities block, firewood, and water. Boats are available for hire and fishing is permitted. It is run by the Wildlife and Environmental Conservation Society of Zambia.
- Kumasamba Lodge, a lodge that has a swimming pool and facilities such as fishing, picnicking and boating. There are a variety of animals that can be seen including crocodiles, pythons, cobras and monitor lizards. There is a big forest where people can move around seeing some other animals such as lions etc.

=== Shopping centres ===
Kitwe has three shopping malls: Copper Hill (on the T3 road), Mukuba Mall (in Parklands at the former Kitwe zoo location) and ECL Business Park (Freedom Park).

Mukuba Mall was opened in April 2015 by President Edgar Chagwa Lungu and cost $50 million to construct. The Freedom Park mall was slated to open in 2014, with construction starting and stopping several times. In May 2016, work resumed and in December 2018, the mall was officially opened and was renamed as ECL Business Park (named after President Edgar Chagwa Lungu).

== Known personalities ==
- Denise Scott Brown, American architect, planner, writer, educator.
- Jane Ohlmeyer, Irish historian.
- Richie Boucher, former Chief Executive of the Bank of Ireland. Born and raised in Kitwe to Irish parents, his father being from Dublin and his mother being from County Cavan.
- Rainford Kalaba, footballer.
- Blaaze, Hip-hop rap singer.
- Frederick Chiluba, 2nd President of Zambia.
- Jacob Mulenga, footballer.
- Kennedy Mweene, ex-goalkeeper of the Zambian football team.
- Zeddy Saileti, ex-footballer and football coach.
- Edgar Chagwa Lungu, 6th President of Zambia.
- Christopher Kang'ombe, the current Member of Parliament for Kamfinsa constituency in Kitwe District.

== Twin towns – sister cities ==
Kitwe is twinned with:

- Baia Mare, Romania
- Detroit, United States

== See also ==
- Railway stations in Zambia
