= Kitwe Teaching Hospital =

Zambian public referral hospital

Kitwe Central Hospital
- Location of Kitwe

Geography
- Location: Kitwe, Copperbelt Province, Zambia
- Coordinates: 12°47′52″S 28°12′36.72″E

Organisation
- Affiliated university: University of Zambia

Services
- Emergency department: Yes
- Beds: 630

Helipads
- Helipad: No

History
- Founded: 1958; 68 years ago

Links
- Other links: List of hospitals in Zambia

Kitwe Central Hospital, also known as Kitwe Teaching Hospital, is third level public tertiary referral hospital in Kitwe, Zambia. The hospital has 630 beds. The facility was opened in 1958. Kitwe Central Hospital (KCH) in the Copperbelt Province is one of four teaching hospitals in Zambia.

== Location ==
The hospital is located along Kuomboka Drive at Plot No. 2831 in Parklands in the City of Kitwe in the Copperbelt Province. It started in 1958 as Llewlyn Hospital, named after Lord Llewelyn, one of the Governors in Northern Rhodesia. It was changed to Kitwe Central Hospital in 1964 following independence. It is the third level referral hospital serving the second largest populated city in Zambia. It has 664 bed capacity and with daily patient traffic of up to 1,300. Kitwe Central Hospital has a length of 2.29 kilometers. The facility has approximately 500 medical and trained administrative personnel. The hospital serves as a Provincial hospital with 3rd level services in Kitwe District.

== Overview ==
As with all public hospitals, it serves as the main referral hospital for Kitwe District. It also provides health services to the local community.

== See also ==
- List of hospitals in Zambia
