= Lufwanyama District =

Coordinates: 12.8947°S 27.3717°E

- District
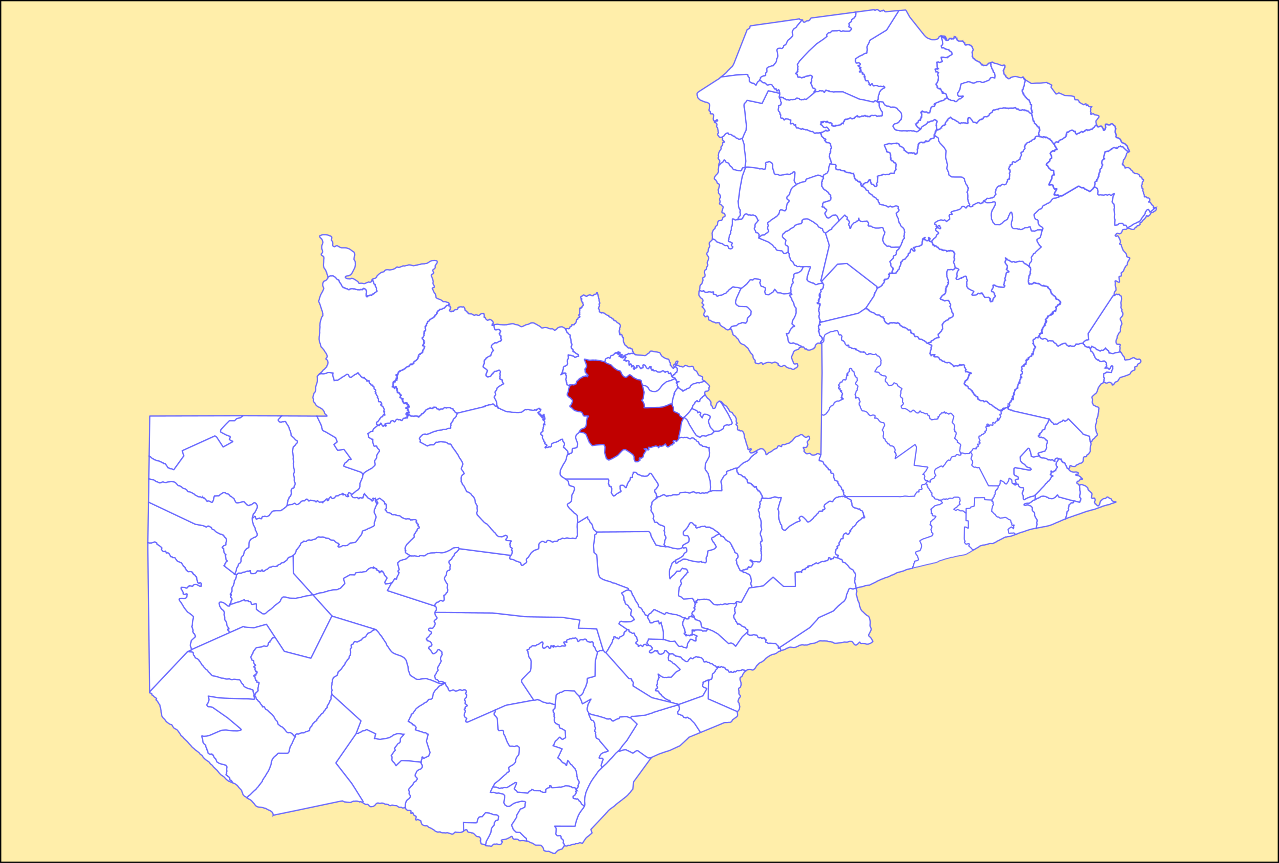
- District location in Zambia
- Country: Zambia
- Province: Copperbelt Province
- Capital: Lufwanyama

Area
  - Total: 11,451 km^{2} (4,421 sq mi)

Population (2022)
  - Total: 133,060
  - Density: 11.620/km^{2} (30.096/sq mi)
- Time zone: UTC+2 (CAT)

Lufwanyama District with headquarters at Lufwanyama is a large rural undeveloped district in the west of Copperbelt Province. It neighbours Mpongwe District and Masaiti District. At one time these three districts were known as 'Ndola Rural'. As of the 2022 Zambian Census, the district had a population of 133,060 people.
