= Road Transport and Safety Agency (Zambia) =

The Road Transport and Safety Agency, popularly known as RTSA, is a road and motor vehicle regulatory body in Zambia. It is the only institution authorised to issue vehicle training and driving licences in Zambia. The agency also ensures that there is road safety in the country. Road traffic safety refers to the methods and measures used to prevent road users from being killed or seriously injured. To reduce global road traffic deaths and injuries, road safety should be a priority for policy-makers around the world, particularly in low- and middleincome countries, where the death rates are the highest. Political will and commitment are key, as is ensuring that road safety decision-making is based on solid evidence.

== Mandate ==
=== The main functions of the Agency ===
- To effectively implement policy on transport, traffic management, and road safety.
- To effectively and efficiently register motor vehicles and trailers in accordance with the road traffic act
- To timely issue licenses and permits in accordance with the road traffic act
- To implement international protocols and treaties on road transport efficiently
- To pay out such percentages of money into the road fund from revenues collected in a transparent and accountable manner
- To conduct effective road safety education
- To coordinate road safety programs effectively
- To approve and monitor the effectiveness of road safety programs undertaken by anybody, person or institution
- To effectively formulate and conduct programs to promote road safety in conjunction with stakeholders.
- To make contributions towards the cost of programs for promoting road safety undertaken by other authorities or bodies.
- Approve safety activities undertaken by other authorities or bodies.
