= Zambia Catholic University =

Private university in Zambia

The Zambia Catholic University
- Motto: Veritas Vos Liberabit (The truth shall set you free)
- Type: Private
- Established: 2008; 18 years ago
- Location: Kalulushi, Zambia; 12°50′18″S 28°05′08″E
- Campus: Urban
- Website: Official website

The Zambia Catholic University (ZCU) is a university in Kalulushi, Zambia. The University opened in April 2008. As of 2011, degrees could be earned in education, development studies, business administration, economics, banking and finance, accountancy, human resource management and business information technology.

== See also ==
- List of universities in Zambia
