= Luanshya =

- Town
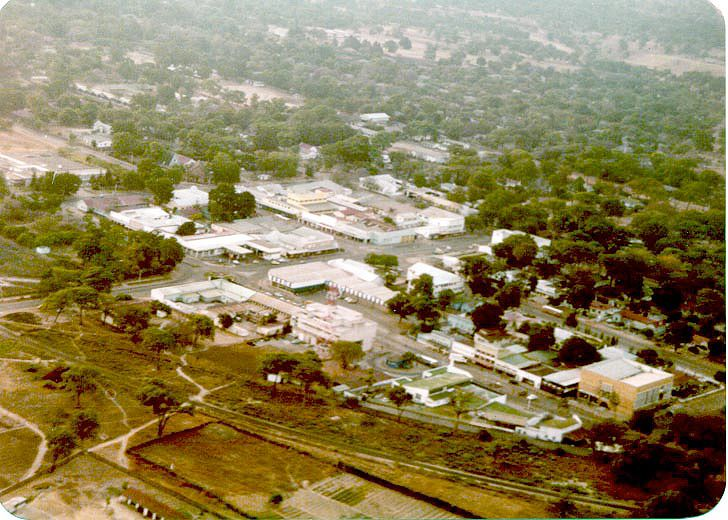

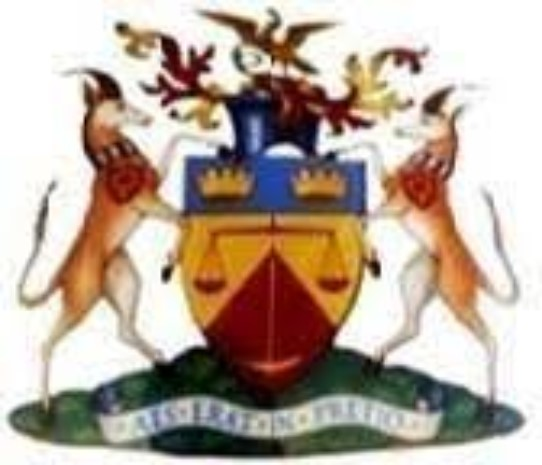
- Seal
- Nickname: wall fence town
- Location in Zambia
- Coordinates: 13°08′S 28°24′E
- Country: Zambia
- Province: Copperbelt Province
- District: Luanshya District
- Established: 1902

Government
  - Type: Municipal Government
  - Town Clerk: Sombo Kawilila

Area
  - Urban: 1,007.6087 km^{2} (389.0399 sq mi)
- Elevation: 1,225 m (4,019 ft)

Population (2020)
  - Town: 154,863
- Time zone: UTC+2 (CAT)
- Area code: (+260) 2
- Climate: Cwa

Luanshya is a town in Zambia, in the Copperbelt Province near Ndola. It has a population of 212,864 (2022 Census). The town is situated in an area which was under Chief Mushili of the Lamba people.

Luanshya was founded in the early part of the 20th century after prospector/explorer William Collier shot and killed a roan antelope on the banks of the Luanshya River, discovering a copper deposit in the process. The antelope fell to the ground, its head resting on a rock where an exposed seam of copper ore was visible. The mining company eventually formed to exploit Collier's find was named "Roan Antelope Copper Mines Ltd".

For most of the 20th century, copper was mined in great quantities at Luanshya but towards the end of the century, mining there became increasingly uneconomic, causing a severe recession in the town. There is still a fair amount of copper underground. Whether the town sees a revival in its fortunes will depend on how efficiently the copper is extracted and sold.

The Roan Antelope Rugby Club in Luanshya formerly held the record for highest goal posts in the world, which were recognised by the Guinness Book of Records. They were 110 ft, 6 inches high.

In the 1960s, Luanshya was known as the "Garden Town of the Copperbelt". This was largely due to the efforts of the late Bill and Doreen Altern, who initiated impressive public parks and gardens.

To the southwest of Luanshya lies Makoma Dam, an artificial tailings dam created to contain water pumped out of the mines, thereby limiting contamination of natural water sources. Since the tailings water contained copper sulphate and other copper compiounds, the water killed off the bilharzia larvae and infected snails, making the water safe for humans to swim and enjoy boating activities.

== Myth ==
A popular myth is that there was a river snake which was held responsible for the floodings and deaths during the early development work at Roan Antelope Mine. Roan's workers suffered such high illness and mortality rates from malaria and blackwater fever, as well as from typhus, dysentery and pneumonia, that the mine had great difficulty keeping African laborers from one week to the next. It became common knowledge that the local Lamba attributed these problems to a giant snake, which wriggled along the river and mine shafts causing floodings and cave-ins, and spewing poisonous gas. By 1928, construction of the plant and township had begun soon after reserves of approximately 20 million tons of copper had been found. The flooding problem was solved when the Luanshya River was channeled and its swamps drained during the 1929-32 anti-malaria campaign.

The death rate from the epidemic that occurred during the early days of mine development earned the town the nickname of Valley of Death which some people latched on to as the real meaning. However, Luanshya means river of antelopes due to the many antelopes that were found in the area before mining settlements drove them away. Places thus named are Luanshya River, Luanshya Stream, Luanshya Town and Luanshya Township. The name for the Town is said to have been derived from the Luanshia mining claim. Three mining claims were named after antelopes, Rietbok, Roan Antelope and Luanshia Mining Claims.

== Education ==
Luanshya is the home base of a Technical and Vocational Teacher's College (TVTC) from which a generation of the country's teachers in technical subjects have graduated. The town also has Luanshya Technical and Business College (LTBC) offering technical subjects to tertiary students. LTBC and TVTC are just separated by fence, and across the road to the West is Da Gama school, one of the only school on the Copperbelt Province for people with disabilities, is managed by nuns and named after the famous Portuguese explorer Vasco da Gama.

Before Independence, schools were racially segregated, with separate schooling for Europeans, Asians, Cape Coloureds and Africans. There were two schools for white pupils: Luanshya Primary School which is now called Central and Luanshya High School. There was Asoka Primary School for Asians, later named Gandhi, near the Second Class Trade area. For Africans there was Arusha Primary School in Mikomfwa, Mwaiseni in Mpatamatu and Fisansa in Roan townships.

After independence, more schools were built. In Mikomfwa, new schools were Ndelela, East School now Twatemwa, West School now Muchinshi, Mipundu, Mikomfwa and Arusha was later renamed Bwananyina. In Roan Township there were Roan, Chaisa, Makoma, Kafubu primary schools, while Mpatamatu had Mpatamatu, Nkulumashiba, Nkambo, primary schools. Luanshya township had Rivercross, Harrison now Mpelembe, Convent now known as Buteko.

SECONDARY SCHOOLS: Mikomfwa township had no secondary school, Luanshya township had Luanshya High School for boys and Luanshya Girls High school, Roan township had only Roan Antelope and Mpatamatu township had Mpatamatu secondary.

== Economic activity ==
During Zambia's privatisation period, thousands of miners were laid off by the Indian run RAMCOZ. During the presidency of Levy Mwanawasa, the town was revived when Luanshya Copper Mines resumed full scale mining production and hired thousands of people, although that was to be short lived when the mining operator ran into financial problems.

The mines were quickly taken over by a Chinese firm. The Chinese workforce has been accused of gross negligence and flouting Labour laws.

In 2011 three Chinese workers were arrested for allegedly molesting local girls by taking advantage of their deprived economic status. Early in 2012, then Minister for Labour and Sport and area Member of Parliament Chishimba Kambwili made a surprise stop over at the multimillion-dollar Mulyashi Mine Project only to be turned away by its Chinese employers.

While the opening of the mines may have brought some social problems to Luanshya, employment rates have risen and revived the town. The population has been steadily increasing and more economic activities are visible such as the installation of a new Soya Solvent extraction plant, as well as the extension of a well known milling company. The agricultural sector is growing as small scale farmers are increasing their crop outputs to cope with growing demand. Main crops that are harvested include maize, wheat, and soybeans.

== Healthcare ==
The town has three hospitals:

- Roan General Hospital – acute care facility with emergency facilities
- Thomson Hospital – government district hospital
- Luanshya Hospital

== Transportation ==
=== Air ===
Luanshya Airport (ICAO: FLLA) is a small airstrip located in the eastern part of the town called Ndeke to mean "Air plane". The airstrip is not currently operational and consists of a rough unmarked 4,200 foot (1280 m) landing strip. A flying club is located at the airstrip.

The town is accessible by an international airport, namely the Simon Mwansa Kapwepwe International Airport in Ndola approximately 28 kilometres to the north-east by road.

=== Land ===
Luanshya is at the end of an 8km spur road that comes off the T3 road (Ndola-Kitwe Dual Carriageway). There are a few other roads that connect Luanshya to other parts of the Copperbelt Province (the M6 road connects east to Kafulafuta and another road connects south to Masaiti and Mpongwe).

Up till about 2009, the Zambia Railways service to Luanshya was freight only, to service copper mine haulage to and from Ndola. Around 2009, the railway line from Luanshya to Ndola was vandalised by scrap metal dealers. Railway Systems of Zambia (RSZ) deny ownership and claim responsibility lies with the central Zambian Government. At present Luanshya and Ndola are no-longer connected by a rail line, and copper mined from Luanshya is now transported by road to outside markets.

Many of the urban roads in Luanshya are named after trees, and athe initial letter of each tree has become name of that road: Casuarina became C Avenue, Datura Ave became D Avenue. Eucalyptus Ave became E Avenue, and so on. Most of the roads parallel with each other, in alphabetical order. The other groups of the alphabet are also grouped together in parallel lines H, G, J and l in a place called New Town although K, O, P, W avenue is right on the other side of town and ran parallel to N avenue.

== Notable people ==
- Sikota Wina - freedom fighter and politician
- Ester Banda - politician
- John Edmond - folk singer
- Anthony Clifford Grayling - philosopher
- Vernon Johnson Mwaanga - diplomat and politician
- Benjamin Yoram Mwila - politician
- George Kunda - former Vice-President of Zambia
- Samuel Ndlovu - footballer
- Bernard Chanda - footballer
- Collins Mbesuma - footballer
- Charles Kasonde - priest
- Emmanuel Mwamba - diplomat and politician
- Chishimba Kambwili - politician
- Peter Kapala - politician
