= Gladys Lundwe =

Zambian politician

Gladys Lundwe (born 24 December 1964) is a Zambian politician who was Minister of Lands from 2010 to 2013.

== Early life and education ==
Lundwe was born on 24 December 1964. She is a member of the Lamba people. She has a diploma in Human Resources Development.

== Career ==
Lundwe worked as a secretary before being elected to the National Assembly as the Movement for Multi-Party Democracy representative for the Masaiti constituency in the 2006 election.

In October 2006, she was appointed Vice-Minister of the Vice President's office with responsibility for public appointments. From 2007 to 2010 she was Deputy Minister of Energy and Water Development. In 2010, President Rupiah Banda appointed her to Cabinet as Minister of Lands.
