= Kasempa District =

Coordinates: 13°50′S 26°00′E

- District
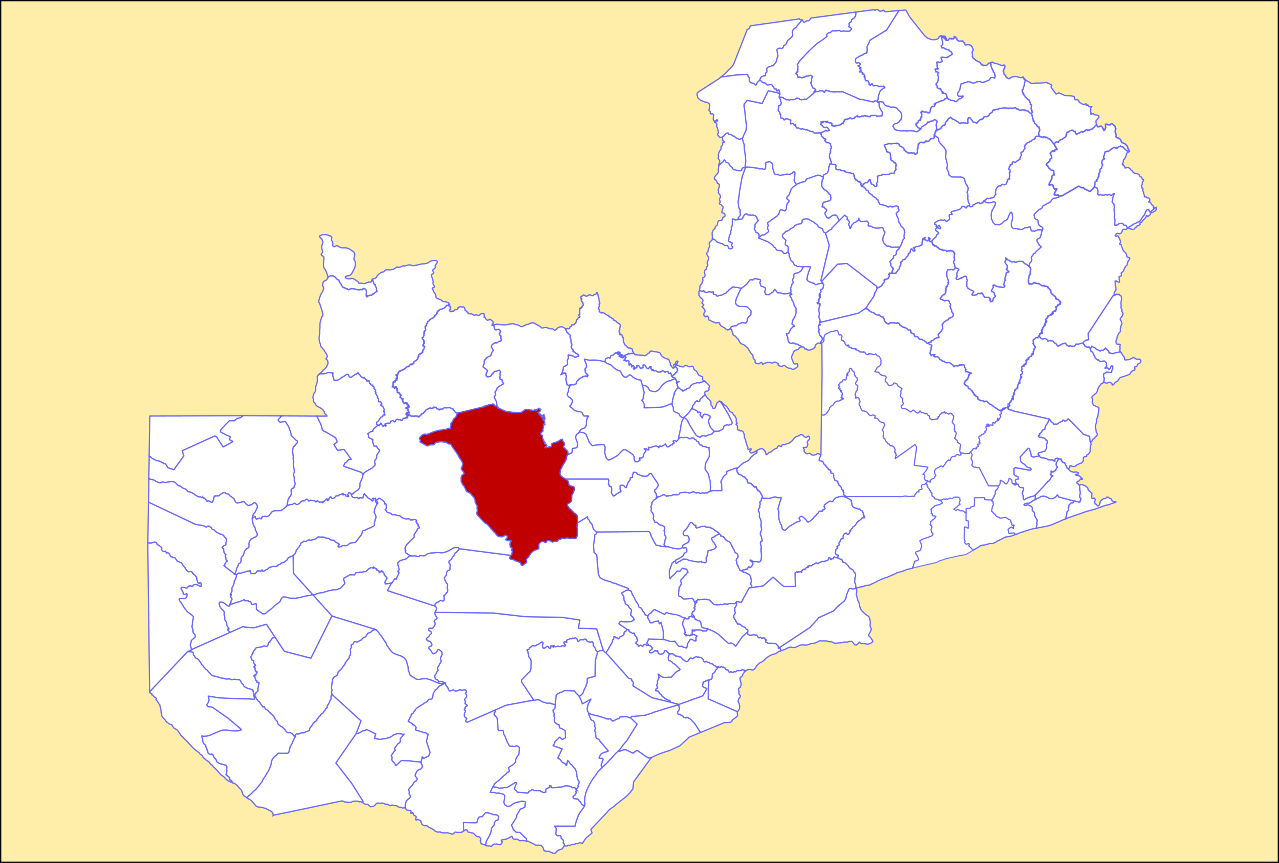
- District location in Zambia
- Country: Zambia
- Province: North-Western Province
- Capital: Kasempa

Area
  - Total: 21,859.6 km^{2} (8,440.0 sq mi)

Population (2022)
  - Total: 111,272
  - Density: 5.09030/km^{2} (13.1838/sq mi)
- Time zone: UTC+2 (CAT)

Kasempa District is a district of Zambia, located in North-Western Province. The capital lies at Kasempa. As of the 2022 Zambian Census, the district had a population of 111,272 people.
