= Luanshya District =

Coordinates: 13°00′S 28°20′E

- District
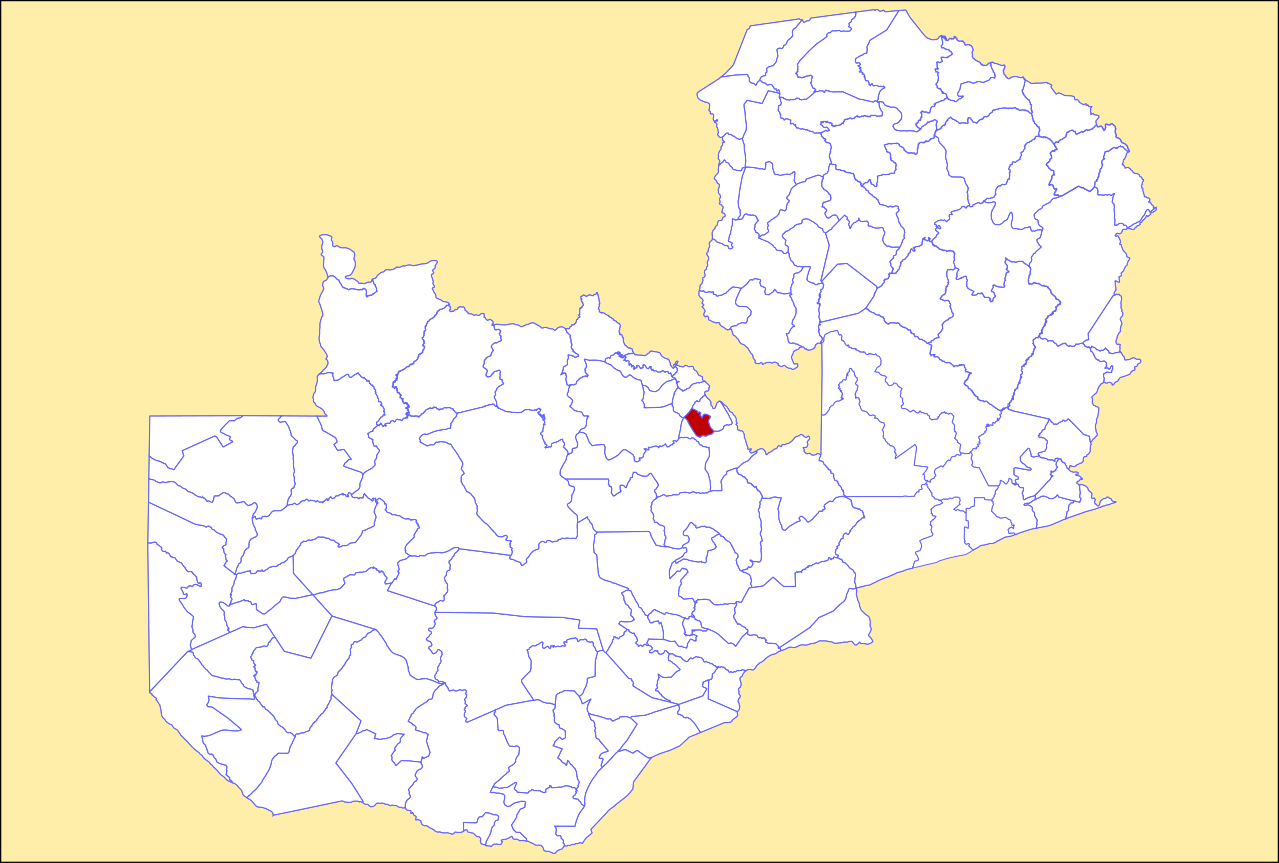
- District location in Zambia
- Country: Zambia
- Province: Copperbelt Province
- Capital: Luanshya

Area
  - Total: 932.4 km^{2} (360.0 sq mi)

Population (2022)
  - Total: 211,966
  - Density: 227.3/km^{2} (588.8/sq mi)
- Time zone: UTC+2 (CAT)

Luanshya District is a district of Zambia, located in Copperbelt Province. The capital lies at Luanshya. As of the 2022 Zambian census, the district had a population of 211,966 people.
