= Kasempa =

- Map of Zambia showing the location of Kasempa.
- Coordinates: 13°27′18″S 25°50′06″E
- Country: Zambia
- Province: North-Western Province
- District: Kasempa District
- Elevation: 1,140 m (3,740 ft)

Population (2022 Estimate)
  - Total: 111 272
- Time zone: UTC+2 (CAT)
- Climate: Cwa

Kasempa is a town located in Kasempa District, North-Western Province, Zambia. It is approximately 550 kilometres (340 mi) by road northwest of Lusaka, the capital. Kasempa is located on the western bank of the Lufupa River as it flows south into the Kafue National Park.

== Population ==
As of December 2022, the population of Kasempa from all the boundaries of the district is approximately 111,272.

== Landmarks ==
The landmarks within the town limits or close to the edges of the town include:

- Mukinge Mission Hospital is a major hospital for the mission SIM and the Evangelical Church in Zambia (ECZ).
- Kasempa Clinic
- Kasempa Radio Mast
- Kasempa Central Market
- The Junction Between Mumbwa-Kankwenda Highway (D181) and the Kaoma-Kasempa Highway (D301).
- Kasempa Day Secondary School
- Kasempa Primary & Basic School
- Kasempa Boys Boarding School
- Mukinge Girls Secondary School
- Mukinge Day Secondary School
- Mukinge Airport

== Climate ==
Climate data for Kasempa (1961–1991)
Month	Jan	Feb	Mar	Apr	May	Jun	Jul	Aug	Sep	Oct	Nov	Dec	Year
Record high °C (°F)	32.2 (90.0)	32.6 (90.7)	33.0 (91.4)	33.0 (91.4)	32.0 (89.6)	30.5 (86.9)	31.9 (89.4)	34.0 (93.2)	36.3 (97.3)	37.1 (98.8)	36.9 (98.4)	33.5 (92.3)	37.1 (98.8)
Mean daily maximum °C (°F)	27.5 (81.5)	27.8 (82.0)	28.0 (82.4)	28.1 (82.6)	27.1 (80.8)	25.7 (78.3)	25.8 (78.4)	28.2 (82.8)	31.6 (88.9)	32.1 (89.8)	29.3 (84.7)	27.7 (81.9)	28.2 (82.8)
Mean daily minimum °C (°F)	16.9 (62.4)	16.9 (62.4)	16.3 (61.3)	13.9 (57.0)	9.8 (49.6)	6.6 (43.9)	6.7 (44.1)	9.2 (48.6)	13.0 (55.4)	15.4 (59.7)	16.4 (61.5)	16.9 (62.4)	13.2 (55.8)
Record low °C (°F)	11.2 (52.2)	12.4 (54.3)	9.1 (48.4)	5.7 (42.3)	1.0 (33.8)	−5.1 (22.8)	−0.9 (30.4)	0.0 (32.0)	1.2 (34.2)	5.1 (41.2)	5.0 (41.0)	12.0 (53.6)	−5.1 (22.8)
Average precipitation mm (inches)	257.5 (10.14)	214.7 (8.45)	171.5 (6.75)	48.9 (1.93)	3.6 (0.14)	0.4 (0.02)	0.0 (0.0)	1.0 (0.04)	4.1 (0.16)	45.6 (1.80)	145.9 (5.74)	253.6 (9.98)	1,146.7 (45.15)
Average precipitation days (≥ 1.0 mm)	22	19	15	5	0	0	0	0	1	5	15	22	104
Average relative humidity (%) (daily average)	78.7	78.8	75.8	69.1	63.5	58.1	53.4	46.2	40.9	50.8	63.5	76.4	62.9
Source: NOAA
