= Masaiti District =

Coordinates: 13°18′S 28°42′E

- District
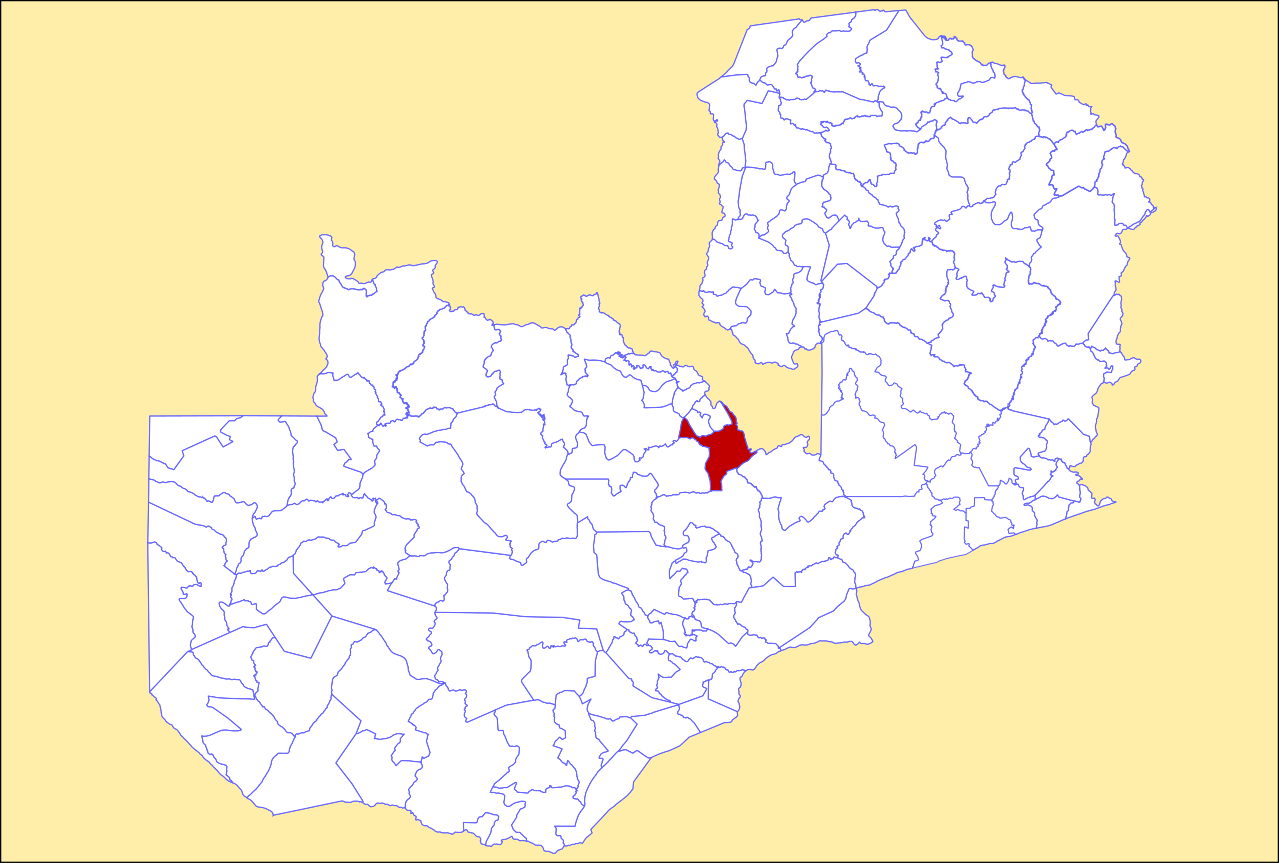
- District location in Zambia
- Country: Zambia
- Province: Copperbelt Province
- Capital: Masaiti

Area
  - Total: 3,697.4 km^{2} (1,427.6 sq mi)

Population (2022)
  - Total: 177,829
  - Density: 48.096/km^{2} (124.57/sq mi)
- Time zone: UTC+2 (CAT)

Masaiti District is a district of Zambia, located in Copperbelt Province. The capital lies at Masaiti. As of the 2000 Zambian Census, the district had a population of 177,829 people. It is divided into two constituencies, namely Masaiti constituency and Kafulafuta constituency.

It neighbours Lufwanyama District and Mpongwe District. At one time, before 1997, these three districts were known as 'Ndola Rural'.
