= Kalulushi =

Town in Copperbelt Province, Zambia

Coordinates: 12°50′S 28°05′E

Kalulushi is a town in the Copperbelt Province in north central Zambia. It is located on the M18 road approximately 12 km west of Kitwe. The population of Kalulushi District was 170,701 at the 2022 census. Kalulushi emerged as a planned company town with the development of mining Companies in the mid-20th century - initially housing the main offices for the Zambia Consolidated Copper Mines. Economic activity in Kalulushi (as well as the surrounding area) declined severely with the closure of 2 Shaft and 7 Shaft Mining sites.

Kalulushi was named after a local river. The name "Kalulushi" is derived from the Lamba language, spoken by the indigenous people of the area. It refers to the Kalulushi River, which flows through the region. The river's name is believed to come from the word "kalulu," meaning "hare" in the Lamba language, symbolizing the abundant wildlife that once lived along the river. Over time, the area surrounding the river developed into a mining town, but the name has remained rooted in the natural landscape.

Kalulushi was established in 1953 as a company town for workers at the nearby Chibuluma copper and cobalt mine, and it became a public town in 1958. It is located 14 km (9 mi) west of Kitwe, the nearest rail station, at an altitude of 1,260 m (4,130 ft). The city's major employer is Chambishi metals. The Chati Forest Reserve west of the city manages large plantations of eucalyptus, tropical pine, and other exotic tree species supplying wood for the mining industry. The Woods are also supplied to ZESCO an electricity company.

== Schools in Kalulushi ==
- Kalulushi trust school
- Chavuma high school

== Universities and colleges ==
Kalulushi has one university and two colleges:

Zambia Catholic University is a private owned university located on President Avenue in Kalulushi and run by the Zambia Episcopal Conference. The university opened in April 2008. As of 2011, degrees could be earned in education, development studies, business administration, economics, banking and finance, accountancy, human resource management and business information technology.

Kalulushi College of Nursing (KCN) is a privately owned College which is located on Tigwilizane street, off President Avenue. The college which offers Nursing training was opened in 2017 and it has about 500 students.

Chibuluma College of Health Sciences is on a 12 hectare piece of land along the road to Chibuluma Mine. The college offers self-catering accommodation. The college has a multi-purpose sports court catering for tennis, volleyball, basketball, soccer.
