= Kalulushi District =

Coordinates: 12°40′S 28°00′E

- District
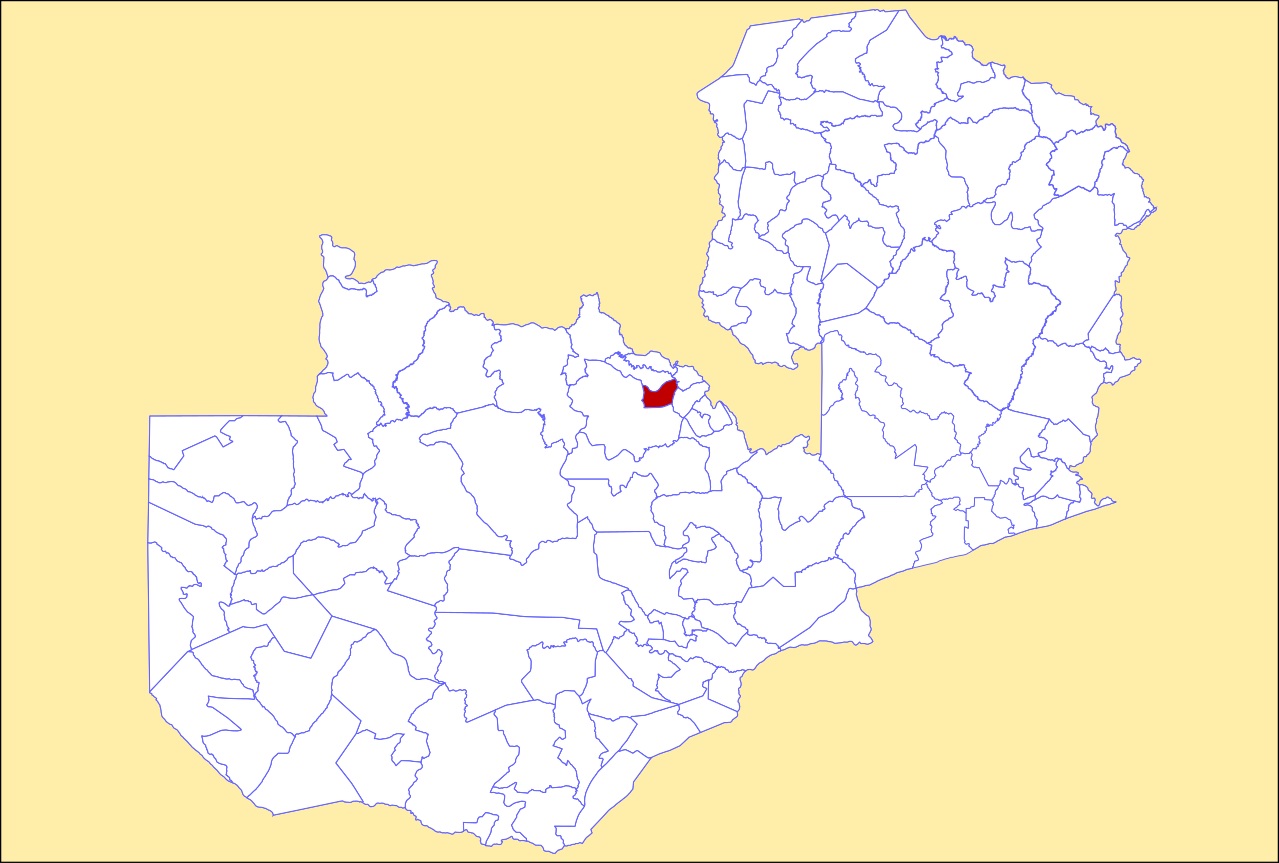
- District location in Zambia
- Country: Zambia
- Province: Copperbelt Province
- Capital: Kalulushi

Area
  - Total: 1,038.3 km^{2} (400.9 sq mi)

Population (2022)
  - Total: 170,701
  - Density: 164.40/km^{2} (425.81/sq mi)
- Time zone: UTC+2 (CAT)

Kalulushi District is a district of Zambia, located in Copperbelt Province. The capital lies at Kalulushi. As of the 2022 Zambian Census, the district had a population of 170,701 people.
