= Copperbelt Province =

Province of Zambia

Copperbelt
- Province
- Map of the Copperbelt Province

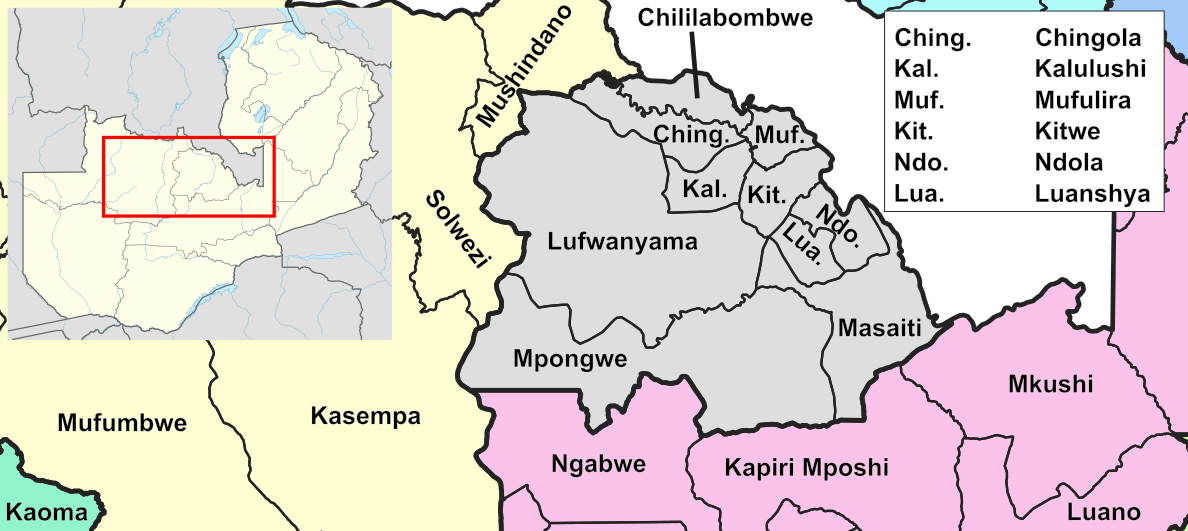
- Map of the Copperbelt Province showing its districts (in gray)
- Coordinates: 13°00′S 28°00′E
- Country: Zambia
- Capital: Ndola

Government
  - Type: Provincial Administration
  - Provincial Minister: Elisha Matambo (UPND)

Area
  - Total: 31,328 km^{2} (12,096 sq mi)
- Elevation: 1,216 m (3,990 ft)

Population (2022 census)
  - Total: 2,768,192
  - Density: 88.362/km^{2} (228.86/sq mi)
- Time zone: UTC+2
- ISO 3166 code: ZM-08
- HDI (2018): 0.658 medium · 2nd
- Website: www.cbt.gov.zm

Copperbelt Province is a province in Zambia which covers the mineral-rich Copperbelt, and farming and bush areas to the south. It was the backbone of the Northern Rhodesian economy during British colonial rule and fuelled the hopes of the immediate post-independence period, but its economic importance was severely damaged by a crash in global copper prices in 1973. The province adjoins the Haut-Katanga province of the Democratic Republic of the Congo, which is similarly mineral-rich.

The main cities and towns of the Copperbelt are Kitwe, Ndola, Mufulira, Luanshya, Chingola, Kalulushi and Chililabombwe. Roads and rail links extend north into the Congo to Lubumbashi, but the Second Congo War brought economic contact between the two countries to a standstill, now recovering.

It is informally referred to at times as 'Copala' or 'Kopala', invoking the vernacular-like term of the mineral copper that is mined in the province.

== Geography ==
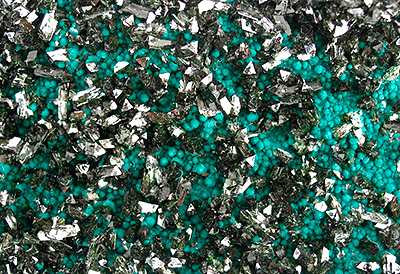
Brochantite on Chrysocolla, Rokana Mine, Kitwe

The Copperbelt region of Zambia and Congo D.R. is a 500 million year old mountain chain, the Lufilian Arc, which formed when two large pieces of continental crust, the Kalahari craton and the Congo craton, collided. This collision was one of the many that happened between 700 and 500 million years ago to form the Gondwana supercontinent.

This collision is thought to have remobilised base metals, largely already present in the sediments that had accumulated in the basin between the two cratons. These brines then concentrated the base metals either along stratigraphic boundaries, or along fractures, faults or within structurally controlled 'traps' (such as the nose of a fold). The collision also produced crustal shortening, during which the stratigraphic sequence was tectonically pushed northwards on top of the Congo Craton.

The Lufilian Arc contains two diamictites, megaconglomerates of glacial origin. One of those is correlated with the Sturtian glaciation, while another correlates with the Marinoan glaciation, both global glaciation events that had profound influence on the history of the planet.

The Lufilian Arc is correlated along trend to the west with the Damara Orogen in Namibia, which also hosts large mineral deposits.

Copperbelt Province is rich with mineral finds and mines. The name of the province is given by the rich finds of copper ore (e.g. Chingola, Konkola, Nchanga Mines), but notable are also emerald mines along Kafubu River, which in the first six months of 2011 yielded 3.74 tons of high quality emeralds.

=== Climate ===
Climate data for Copperbelt (Zambia)
Month	Jan	Feb	Mar	Apr	May	Jun	Jul	Aug	Sep	Oct	Nov	Dec	Year
Record high °C (°F)	26.6 (79.9)	26.9 (80.4)	27.4 (81.3)	27.5 (81.5)	26.6 (79.9)	25.1 (77.2)	25.2 (77.4)	27.5 (81.5)	30.5 (86.9)	31.5 (88.7)	29.4 (84.9)	27 (81)	31.5 (88.7)
Mean daily maximum °C (°F)	20.8 (69.4)	20.8 (69.4)	21 (70)	20.5 (68.9)	18.6 (65.5)	16.5 (61.7)	16.7 (62.1)	19.2 (66.6)	22.5 (72.5)	23.7 (74.7)	22.5 (72.5)	21 (70)	23.7 (74.7)
Mean daily minimum °C (°F)	17.1 (62.8)	17.1 (62.8)	16.5 (61.7)	14.4 (57.9)	10.8 (51.4)	7.9 (46.2)	7.8 (46.0)	10.2 (50.4)	13.6 (56.5)	16.2 (61.2)	17.1 (62.8)	17.2 (63.0)	7.8 (46.0)
Average precipitation mm (inches)	291 (11.5)	222 (8.7)	165 (6.5)	35 (1.4)	4 (0.2)	0 (0)	0 (0)	0 (0)	1 (0.0)	17 (0.7)	118 (4.6)	267 (10.5)	1,120 (44.1)
Source 1:
Source 2:

=== Wildlife areas ===
There are no national parks in this most urban and industrial of Zambia's provinces. Other parks with wildlife aspects:

- Chembe Bird Sanctuary west of Kitwe includes crocodiles and Sitatunga as well as plentiful bird life.
- Chimfunshi Wildlife Orphanage (established mainly to rescue captive non-indigenous chimpanzees).

== Demographics ==
Historical population
Year	Pop.	±%
1964	544,000	—
1969	816,000	+50.0%
1980	1,545,042	+89.3%
1990	1,568,571	+1.5%
2000	1,581,221	+0.8%
2010	1,972,317	+24.7%
2022	2,768,192	+40.4%
Sources: 1964-69: 1980-2000: 2010:

As per the 2010 Zambian census, Copperbelt Province had a population of 1,972,317 accounting to 15.21% of the total Zambian population of 13,092,666. There were 981,887 males and 990,430 females, making the sex ratio to 1,009 for every 1,000 males, compared to the national average of 1,028. The literacy rate stood at 83.10% against a national average of 70.2%. The rural population constituted 19.11%, while the urban population was 80.89%. The total area of the province was 31,328 km^{2} and the population density was 63.00 per km^{2}. The population density during 2000 Zambian census stood at 63.00. The decadal population growth of the province was 2.20%. The median age in the province at the time of marriage was 21.7. The average household size was 5.3, with the families headed by females being 4.8 and 5.5 for families headed by men. The total eligible voters in the province was 66.10%. The unemployment rate of the province was 22.10%. The total fertility rate was 5.0, complete birth rate was 5.8, crude birth rate was 29.0, child women population at birth was 587, general fertility rate was 112, gross reproduction rate was 1.8 and net reproduction rate was 1.7. The total labour force constituted 50.40% of the total population. Out of the labour force, 63.2% were men and 37.7% women. The annual growth rate of labour force was 2.7%. Bemba was the most spoken language with 83.90% speaking it. The total population in the province with albinism stood at 2,912. The life expectancy at birth stood at 54 compared to the national average of 51.

== Administration ==
Profession	% of working population
Agriculture, Forestry & Fishing (by Industry)	7.50
Community, Social and Personal	25.20
Construction	21.60
Electricity, Gas, and water	41.60
Financial & Insurance activities	34.90
Hotels and Restaurants	17.00
Manufacturing	24.60
Mining & Quarrying	76.90
Transportation and Storage	29.30
Wholesale & Retail Trade	23.00

Provincial administration is set up purely for administrative purposes. The province is headed by a minister appointed by the President and there are ministries of central government for each province. The administrative head of the province is the Permanent Secretary, appointed by the President. There is a Deputy Permanent Secretary, heads of government departments and civil servants at the provincial level. Copperbelt Province is divided into ten districts, namely, Chililabombwe District, Chingola District, Kalulushi District, Kitwe District, Luanshya District, Lufwanyama District, Masaiti District, Mpongwe District, Mufulira District and Ndola District. All the district headquarters are the same as the district names. There are ten councils in the province, each of which is headed by an elected representative, called councilor. Each councilor holds office for three years. The administrative staff of the council is selected based on Local Government Service Commission from within or outside the district. The office of the provincial government is located in each of the district headquarters and has provincial local government officers and auditors. Each council is responsible for raising and collecting local taxes and the budgets of the council are audited and submitted every year after the annual budget. The elected members of the council do not draw salaries, but are paid allowances from the council. The Copperbelt province is a predominantly urban district and has three city councils. The government stipulates 63 different functions for the councils with the majority of them being infrastructure management and local administration. Councils are mandated to maintain each of their community centres, zoos, local parks, drainage system, playgrounds, cemeteries, caravan sites, libraries, museums and art galleries. They also work along with specific government departments for helping in agriculture, conservation of natural resources, postal service, establishing and maintaining hospitals, schools and colleges. The councils prepare schemes that encourage community participation.

== Economy and education ==
HIV infected & AIDS deaths
Year	HIV infected	AIDS deaths
1985	6,719	107
1990	154,131	4,664
1995	235,586	17,485
2000	265,518	26,801
2005	268,790	27,553
2010	256,374	26,799

As 2004, the province had 856 basic schools, 71 high schools and the number of school children out of school in ages between 7 and 15 stood at 856. The unemployment rate was 32 per cent and the general unemployment rate for youth stood at 55 per cent as of 2008. The province had 213 doctors as of 2005. There were 377 Malaria incidence for every 1,000 people in the province as of 2005 and there were 26,799 AIDS death as of 2010.

The total area of crops planted during the year 2014 in the province was 122,525.52 hectares which constituted 6.46% of the total area cultivated in Zambia. The net production stood at 315,153 metric tonnes, which formed 7.74% of the total agricultural production in the country. Maize was the major crop in the province with 37,610 metric tonnes, constituting 17.56% of the national output.

== See also ==
- Bibliography of the history of Zambia § Mining and industry
