= M8 road (Zambia) =

Road in the North-Western Province of Zambia

M8 Road

Route information
- Length: 464 km (288 mi)

Major junctions
- East end: T5 in Mutanda
- M18 near Kasempa
- West end: D293/RD296 in Zambezi

Location
- Country: Zambia
- Provinces: North-Western
- Major cities: Mutanda, Mufumbwe, Kabompo, Zambezi

Highway system
- Transport in Zambia
← M7	→ M9

The M8 road is a road in the North-Western Province of Zambia. It connects Mutanda (south-west of Solwezi) with Zambezi Town via Mufumbwe, Manyinga & Kabompo.

== Route ==
The M8 road begins in Mutanda, Kalumbila District (30 kilometres south-south-west of Solwezi), at a t-junction with the T5 road between Solwezi and Mwinilunga. The route begins by going southwards for 85 kilometres up to the settlement named Kawana in Kasempa District, where it meets the western terminus of the M18 road from Lufwanyama and Kitwe in the Copperbelt Province.

After Kawana, the M8 begins to turn westwards and goes for 15 kilometres to meet a road, designated as the D181, which connects southwards to the town of Kasempa (45 kilometres away). After the Kasempa turn-off, the road continues westwards for 100 kilometres to the town of Mufumbwe in the district of the same name. From Mufumbwe, the road continues west-south-west for 93 kilometres, bypassing the West Lunga National Park, following the Kabompo River and crossing it, to the town of Manyinga in the district of the same name, where it meets a road (D286) going north to Mwinilunga.

The M8 route continues south-west, still following the Kabompo River, for 30 kilometres to the town of Kabompo. From Kabompo, the road continues west-south-west for 67 kilometres to a place called Chilikita, where it meets a road going south to Watopa and Lukulu in the Western Province (via the Kabompo Ferry). From Chilikita, the road continues west-north-west for 72 kilometres to end at a 4-way-intersection with the D293 and RD296 in Zambezi Town. The D293 connects north to the town of Chavuma.

== Mutanda-Kasempa-Kaoma road concession ==
On 1 December 2024, the Government of Zambia (represented by the Minister of Finance, Situmbeko Musokotwane) signed a Public–private partnership (concession) agreement with Barotse Highway Limited (in partnership with First Quantum Minerals) for the rehabilitation and maintenance of the road from Mutanda to Kasempa and the road from Kasempa to Kaoma (amounting to 371 kilometres). The applicable route includes the M8 road from the T5 junction in Mutanda southwards to the D181 junction in Kasempa District (105 km), the D181 from there southwards to Kasempa (45 km) and the D301 from Kasempa south-west to Kaoma (221 km). The concession agreement is for 25 years and the project is expected to cost $326.4 million.

Plans include upgrading the entire route to bituminous standard in the first two years, constructing three toll gates on the route (one between Kaoma and Kasempa and two between Kasempa and Mutanda), constructing three weighbridges on the route, replacing the Lalafuta and Luena bridges on the section in Kaoma District, constructing social infrastructure on the route and constructing 20 kilometres of urban roads in two districts (10 kilometres in Kasempa District and 10 kilometres in Kaoma District).

Once complete, the road will form part of a shortcut between the Copperbelt region of DR Congo (and Zambia) and the port of Walvis Bay in Namibia, boosting international trade. President Hakainde Hichilema, together with Situmbeko Musokotwane (the Minister of Finance) and Charles Milupi (the Minister of Infrastructure, Housing and Urban Development), attended the groundbreaking ceremony on 31 October 2025 in Kasempa.

== See also ==
- Roads in Zambia
