= T5 road (Zambia) =

Road in Zambia

T5 Road

Route information
- Length: 545 km (339 mi)

Major junctions
- east end: T3 in Chingola
- M8 in Mutanda
- west end: Jimbe border post with Angola

Location
- Country: Zambia
- Provinces: Copperbelt Province, North-Western Province
- Major cities: Chingola, Solwezi, Mwinilunga

Highway system
- Transport in Zambia
← T4	→ T6

The T5 is a trunk road in Zambia. It connects Chingola in the Copperbelt Province with Solwezi and Mwinilunga in the North-Western Province. The route extends to end at the Jimbe border post with Angola. It is the only other road after the M18 road that connects the towns of the North-Western and Copperbelt provinces and is currently the main route motorists use to reach Angola from Zambia. The section of the road from Chingola to Mutanda is a toll road (there is a tollgate just west of Chingola and a tollgate just west of Solwezi).

It is an alternative route to the Beira-Lobito Highway (which passes through the southern part of DR Congo) when travelling from the Copperbelt Province of Zambia to the Moxico Province of Angola.

== Route ==
The T5 road begins 4 kilometres north-west of the city centre of Chingola, Copperbelt Province, by the Chingola River, at an intersection with the T3 road from Kitwe and Ndola in the south-east and the Kasumbalesa Border Post with DR Congo in the north.

The T5 begins by going west for 175 kilometres from Chingola, through the Enoch Kavindele Toll Plaza, through the northern area of Lufwanyama District, crossing into the North-Western Province and passing through Mushindamo District, to the city of Solwezi (The capital of the North-Western Province; south of Kansanshi mine), where it passes through as Independence Avenue. The road bypasses Solwezi Central and Solwezi Airport to the south. This stretch of the road is significantly important and beneficial to businesses and the transport industry, especially for mining.

From Solwezi, the T5 road turns south-south-west and goes for 30 kilometres, through the Humphrey Mulemba Toll Plaza, to the town of Mutanda, where it meets the M8 road (Mutanda-Zambezi Road), which is a road connecting to Kasempa, Kabompo and Zambezi Town. As they meet at a T-junction and the road southwards is the M8, the T5 becomes the road westwards.

From Mutanda, the T5 travels west-north-west for 240 kilometres, through Kalumbila District (where it passes through Manyama and bypasses the Kalumbila mine and town), crossing the Kabompo River and passing through Lumwana, to the town of Mwinilunga. At Mwinilunga, the T5 turns north-north-west and travels for 65 kilometres to the town of Ikelenge in the Ikelenge District.

From Ikelenge, the T5 goes west-north-west for 35 kilometres, through the Kalene Hills of Ikelenge District (bypassing the Zambezi River source and the Zengamina hydro-electric power plant), to end at the Jimbe border post with Angola. The road enters the Moxico Province of Angola and proceeds to the town of Caianda.

== Chingola-Mutanda road concession ==
In 2021, the government of Zambia signed a Public–private partnership (concession) agreement for the tolled 205 kilometre stretch of the T5 from the T3 junction (eastern terminus) in Chingola, through Solwezi, to the M8 junction in Mutanda. The consortium responsible for the design, finance, reconstruction and maintenance of this stretch of road is Bert Pave and Maintenance Limited and the project is expected to cost $250 million. The concession is for 30 years (up to 2051). Plans include transforming the entire section into a dual carriageway with 2 lanes in each direction.

== See also ==
- Transport in Zambia
- Roads in Zambia
