= Mwinilunga (constituency) =

Constituency of the National Assembly of Zambia

Mwinilunga was a constituency of the National Assembly of Zambia. It covered the towns of Chimwishi, Lumwana, Mushinshi and Mwinilunga in Mwinilunga District of North-Western Province. The original Mwinilunga constituency was formed for the 1964 Legislative Council elections. In 1973 it was split into Mwinilunga East and Mwinilunga West. Mwinilunga East was subsequently renamed Mwinilunga in 2011, with Mwinilunga West being renamed Ikeleng'i.

== List of MPs ==
Election year	MP	Party
Mwinilunga
1964	John Japau	Zambian African National Congress
1968	Peter Matoka	United National Independence Party
Mwinilunga East
1973	Rhodes Mangangu	United National Independence Party
1978	Ben Kakoma	United National Independence Party
1983	Ben Kakoma	United National Independence Party
1988	Saimon Nyamboji	United National Independence Party
1991	David Samanana	Movement for Multi-Party Democracy
1996	David Kambilumbilu	Movement for Multi-Party Democracy
2001	James Katoka	United Party for National Development
2003 (by-election)	James Katoka	Movement for Multi-Party Democracy
2006	Stephen Katuka	United Democratic Alliance
Mwinilunga
2011	Stephen Katuka	United Party for National Development
2016	Newton Samakayi	United Party for National Development
2021	Newton Samakayi	United Party for National Development
Seat abolished (split into Mwinilunga West and Mwinilunga East)
