= Lumwana =

- Location in Zambia
- Coordinates: 11°49′32″S 25°08′08″E
- Country: Zambia
- Province: North-Western Province
- District: Mwinilunga District
- Elevation: 4,460 ft (1,360 m)

Population (2010 Estimate)
  - Total: 5,000

'Lumwana is a mining town located in Mwinilunga District, within the North-Western Province of Zambia.

== Geography ==
The town is located on the T5 Highway, approximately 170 kilometres (110 mi), by road, west of Solwezi and 96 kilometres (60 mi) east of Mwinilunga.

Lumwana is approximately 660 kilometres (410 mi) by road northwest of Lusaka, the capital and largest city of Zambia.

It is in the Copperbelt mineral deposits and mining region of Southern Africa.

== Population ==
The population of Lumwana was estimated at less than 1,000 in 1999.

With 1,000 new homes constructed in the town since then, it is estimated that the population of the town in 2010 was approximately 5,000.

== Economy ==
Prior to 1999, Lumwana was a rural village.

In 1999, Equinox Minerals Limited acquired the nearby Lumwana Copper Mine. Over the next 10 years, working with its Zambian subsidiary, Lumwana Mining Company Limited, Equinox carried out feasibility studies, sourced financing and constructed the present infrastructure. The mine was commissioned in December 2008 and is the largest employer in the town. In July 2011, Barrick Gold acquired a 100% interest in Lumwana mine.

As of second quarter 2013, the mine employed approximately 1,850 employees and 4,400 contractors. In addition to copper, the mine also produces cobalt, gold, and uranium.

Lumwana Multi-Facility Economic Zone

An economic development zone, called Lumwana Multi-Facility Economic Zone (LMFEZ), is being developed around the mining operations, to include among others; manufacturing, agroprocessing, hotels, and resorts.

== Transport ==
Lumwana is connected to Solwezi, the capital of North Western Province, by a 175 kilometres (109 mi) paved road (the T5 Road).

The closest air transport facilities are in Solwezi (170 kilometres (110 mi)) and Mwinilunga (96 kilometres (60 mi)). There are also two old gravel airstrips within 10 kilometres (6.2 mi) of Lumwana. These can handle light aircraft. One of the airstrips, located in the northern part of Chief Mukumbi’s area has been historically used by the Flying Doctor Service.

Plans to build a rail line from Chingola, through Lumwana, to join the Angolan Benguela Railway east of Luacano, have reached an advanced stage. In September 2013, the Government of the Republic of Zambia expressed its intentions to advertise the North-West Railway (NWR) project to both local and foreign investors who would be interested to develop the infrastructure.

== Points of interest ==
Points of interest within the town of Lumwana or in the local area include:

- The offices of the Lumwana Town Council
- Lumwana Farmers Market — the largest source of fresh produce in the town.
- Lumwana Copper Mine - A private copper mine that employs over 3,800 people, owned by Equinox Minerals Limited and its Zambian subsidiary, the Lumwana Mining Company Limited.
- A branch of Investrust Bank — A medium-sized commercial bank, licensed by the national banking regulator, the Bank of Zambia.
- Lumwana Premier Resort — a hotel in Manyama, near the Lumwana Copper Mine, and within an hour's drive of Solwezi and Kalumbila.
- North Western University College of Health and Applied Sciences, in Manyama Lumwana, is state of the art university offering health Courses in Registered Nursing and Clinical Medicine. www.nwuc.edu.zm

== See also ==
- Copper mines in Zambia
- Populated places in North-Western Province, Zambia
