= Kabompo (constituency) =

Constituency of the National Assembly of Zambia

Kabompo was a constituency of the National Assembly of Zambia. It covered the towns of Chikonkwelo, Chilikita, Kabompo, Kabulamena, Kayombo, Mumbeji, Samiyengo and Shindola in Kabompo District of North-Western Province.

== List of MPs ==
Election year	MP	Party
Kabompo
1962	No member elected (Note: In the 1962 elections, Kabompo was a two-member 'open' national constituency in which candidates were required to receive at least 10% of the vote from each race, and at least 20% of the vote from either the upper or lower roll in order to be elected. As no candidate passed this threshold in the general election, a by-election was held on 10 December 1962. However, for the second time, no candidate crossed the threshold. The seats were then left unfilled until the next elections.)	
1962 (by-election)	No member elected	
1964	Hannock Kikombe	United National Independence Party
1968	Victor Kanyungulu	United National Independence Party
1973	Moses Chinyeka	United National Independence Party
1978	Benjamin Chipango	United National Independence Party
1983	Benjamin Chipango	United National Independence Party
1988	Mathews Makayi	United National Independence Party
Kabompo West
1991	Mathews Makayi	Movement for Multi-Party Democracy
1996	Daniel Kalenga	Independent
2001	Enoch Kavindele	Movement for Multi-Party Democracy
2006	Daniel Kalenga	Movement for Multi-Party Democracy
2011	Ambrose Lufuma	United Party for National Development
Kabompo
2016	Ambrose Lufuma	United Party for National Development
2021	Ambrose Lufuma	United Party for National Development
Seat abolished (split into Kabompo East and Kabompo West)
