= Solwezi Central =

Constituency of the National Assembly of Zambia

Solwezi Central is a constituency of the National Assembly of Zambia. It covers the towns of Kulima and Solwezi in Solwezi District of North-Western Province.

== List of MPs ==
Election year	MP	Party
Solwezi
1964	William Nkanza	United National Independence Party
1968	Gilbert Wisamba	United National Independence Party
Seat abolished (split into Solwezi East and Solwezi West)
Solwezi Central
1991	Humphrey Mulemba	Movement for Multi-Party Democracy
1993 (by-election)	Humphrey Mulemba	National Party
1996	Ludwig Sondashi	National Party
2001	Benny Tetamashimba	United Party for National Development
2003 (by-election)	Benny Tetamashimba	Movement for Multi-Party Democracy
2006	Benny Tetamashimba	Movement for Multi-Party Democracy
2009 (by-election)	Watson Lumba	United Party for National Development
2011	Lucky Mulusu	Movement for Multi-Party Democracy
2014 (by-election)	Dawson Kafwaya	United Party for National Development
2016	Stafford Mulusa	United Party for National Development
2021	Stafford Mulusa	United Party for National Development
2026	Kawina Poho	Independent
