= Ambrose Lufuma =

Zambian politician (born 1957)

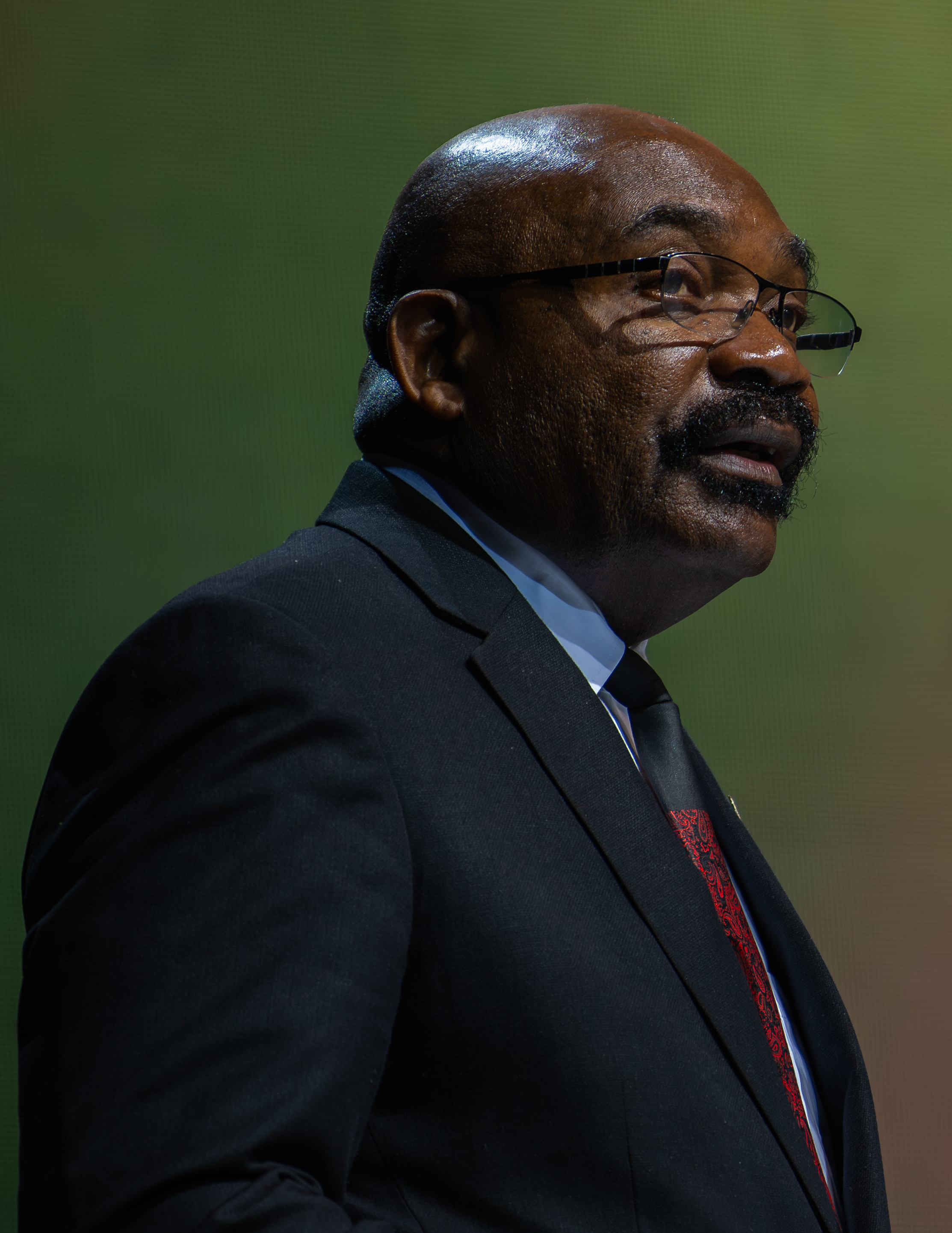
- Lufuma in 2024

Minister of Defence
- Incumbent
- Assumed office September 2021
- Preceded by: Davies Chama

Member of the National Assembly
- In office September 2011 – May 2026
- Preceded by: Daniel Kalenga
- Constituency: Kabompo
- Incumbent
- Assumed office August 2026
- Constituency: Kabompo East

Personal details
- Born: Ambrose Lwiji Lufuma; 26 October 1957 (age 69) Kabompo, Zambia
- Party: United Party for National Development
- Occupation: Economist

Ambrose Lwiji Lufuma (born October 26, 1957) is a Zambian politician, businessman, and economist. He is Zambia's current Minister of Defence and Member of Parliament for Kabompo East. He was the Member of Parliament for Kabompo from September 2011 to May 2026.

== Early life ==
Ambrose was born to Raphael Lufuma and Chisengo in 1957, in Kawanda Village of Kabompo District. He attended Kawanda Primary School. In 1972, he was transferred to Mpima Seminary for his high school education.

== Career ==
In 1976, Ambrose joined the Zambia National Service and underwent military training after graduating from high school. He, later, was selected to go to the University of Zambia; there he studied Economics.

=== Political career ===
In the 1990s, Ambrose became friends with United Party for National Development (UPND) founder, Anderson Mazoka and soon joined his political party. He contested in the 2011, 2016 and 2021 general elections as the UPND parliamentary candidate in Kabompo constituency and he was elected in all three elections. After Hakainde Hichilema won the 2021 presidential election in August 2021, he appointed Lufuma as the Minister of Defence the following month.

Ahead of the 2026 general election, Kabompo constituency was split into two constituencies, namely Kabompo West and Kabompo East. Lufuma stood as the UPND candidate in Kabompo East and he was elected at the election in August 2026. In October 2026, he was re-appointed as the Minister of Defence.
