= West Lunga National Park =

National park in Northwestern Zambia

- Location within Zambia
- Location: Zambia
- Coordinates: 12°47′S 24°45′E
- Area: 1,700 km^{2} (660 sq mi)

West Lunga National Park is a remote national park in dense forest in the Northwestern Province of Zambia, within the Mwinilunga District. It lies between the West Lunga River and Kabompo River about 10 km north of the M8 road from Solwezi to Kabompo, and covers about 1700 km². Within the park, there are a diverse set of natural areas, including forests, seasonally flooded grass valleys, also called dambos, open grasslands, chipya woodlands and papyrus swamps.

The park was originally established as a game reserve during the 1940s, primarily to preserve the population of yellow-backed duiker. The park is one of the more wild parks in Zambia, and has a lower number of visitors than the more popular parks such as Kafue or Lower Zambezi. It remains the least visited park in Zambia as of 2026, and is the only park in Zambia covered by forest and woodland.

The park can be reached from the Copperbelt in the north or Kafue in the south using the tarred M8. About 10 kilometers north of the gravel road which is between Kira and Solweizi. The park’s entrance is accessible only by a dirt track from the main road to the park gate. Jivundu, a small village, to the park’s southwest is the only entrance, and is located about 65 kilometers east of Kabompo.

The area around the park is relatively sparse in human settlements. Within the Mwinilunga district, 95,324 of the 138,618 people live in rural areas, which includes the park periphery. It is estimated that the population density along the riverbank of the West Lunga River is .8 per square kilometer. There are a total of 16,981 households in the rural area of the district. Population density is recorded at the province level. In 2022, Northwestern province had an average population density of 10.2 people per square kilometer, and it remains the least densely populated district in Zambia.

Accommodation within the park is limited to self-camping. Entry to the park is at the Jivunda Pontoon, at 13.101°S 24.693°E, adjacent to the Department of National Parks and Wildlife office. Bush tracks in the Park require 4WD.

Recently, a community-led tour operator, Kafunfula Community Camp, opened at Churu in the Musele GMA northeast of the Park.

== Environment ==
The national park is the only one in Zambia covered by forest, categorised in the small Cryptosepalum dry forests ecoregion, which exists only in a few patches in the south west of the province extending a little over the border into Angola. Cryptosepalum trees (called "mukwe" locally) are evergreen and grow densely with a closed canopy. The ecoregion forms the largest evergreen forest in Africa outside of the equatorial zone. Although the rainfall in the area is quite high (above 1,000 mm per year) the soils are sandy and well drained so apart from the rivers there is a lack of surface water. A few patches of Miombo woodland and grassland also exist in the park. Voacanga africana is common in the park, given the woodland habitat.

== Wildlife and conservation ==
Poaching and the absence of protection until the 1990s have meant a loss of most wildlife in the area, particularly lions, leopards and buffalo. In 2014, a conservation project was established by the Department of National Parks and Wildlife, now under the Ministry of Tourism, and the Trident Foundation, a nonprofit established by First Quantum Minerals to protect the habitat and species in the park. The project, known as West Lunga Conservation Project (WLCP) protects the park’s more unique species, such as the tree pangolin as well as funding the release of additional impala in the park. By 2016, the West Lunga Trust was established by local government, with the use of a Community Resource Board (CRB) to employ local people in conservation and management of the park. The CRB which manages West Lunga Park is located within the Western Region of the Zambia Community Resource Board Association (ZCRBA) program.

Smaller forest mammals such as duiker and bushpigs are still present, and recent reports also mention puku, hippopotami, Nile crocodiles, vervet monkeys, thick-tailed bushbaies and yellow baboons. Sightings have been recorded of buffalo, roan antelopes, sable antelopes, Lichtenstein's hartebeests, impalas, warthogs, side-striped jackals and elephants.

West Lunga is famous among ornithologists given the presence of the rare and only endemic bird species in the region, the white-chested tinkerbird. Only one specimen, in 1964, was ever observed. Recent scientific evidence has disputed the bird is distinct from the yellow-rumped tinkerbird, although the question remains debated. Other bird species include Guinea fowl, shrikes, drongos, and purple-throated cuckoo-shrike.
