= Solwezi North =

National Assembly constituency in Zambia

Solwezi North is a constituency of the National Assembly of Zambia. It was created in 2026 by splitting Solwezi Central. It covers the northern part of Solwezi District, including the Kansanshi mine area.

== List of MPs ==
| Election year | MP | Party |
|---|---|---|
| 2026 | Stafford Mulusa | United Party for National Development |
