= Zambezi West =

Constituency of the National Assembly of Zambia

Zambezi West is a constituency of the National Assembly of Zambia. It covers the western part of Zambezi and the town of Kangano in Zambezi District of North-Western Province.

== List of MPs ==
Election year	MP	Party
Balovale West
1968	Samuel Mbilishi	United National Independence Party
Zambezi West
1973	Rodger Sakuhuka	United National Independence Party
1978	Rodger Sakuhuka	United National Independence Party
1983	Rodger Sakuhuka	United National Independence Party
1988	Rodger Sakuhuka	United National Independence Party
1991	Roy Saviye	United National Independence Party
1996	David Saviye	Movement for Multi-Party Democracy
2001	Charles Kakoma	United Party for National Development
2006	Charles Kakoma	United Democratic Alliance
2011	Charles Kakoma	United Party for National Development
2014 (by-election)	Christabel Ngimbu	Patriotic Front
2016	Prisca Kucheka	United Party for National Development
2021	Vumango Pascal Musumali	United Party for National Development
2026	Vumango Pascal Musumali	United Party for National Development
