= Lumwana (constituency) =

National Assembly constituency in Zambia

Lumwana is a constituency of the National Assembly of Zambia. It was created in 2026 when Solwezi West was split into two constituencies (Lumwana and Kalumbila). It covers the eastern part of Kalumbila District, including Mutanda and Manyama.

== List of MPs ==
Election year	MP	Party
2026	Matthews Mashimango	United Party for National Development
