= Solwezi West =

Constituency of the National Assembly of Zambia

Solwezi West was a constituency of the National Assembly of Zambia. It covered the towns of Mayana, Mumena and Mutanda in Kalumbila District of North-Western Province.

== List of MPs ==
Election year	MP	Party
1973	Timothy Kankasa	United National Independence Party
1978	Beston Mukumbi	United National Independence Party
1983	Beston Mukumbi	United National Independence Party
1988	Beston Mukumbi	United National Independence Party
1991	Bisola Kuliye	Movement for Multi-Party Democracy
1996	Benny Tetamashimba	National Party
2001	Logan Shemena	United Party for National Development
2006	Humphrey Mwanza	Movement for Multi-Party Democracy
2011	Humphrey Mwanza	Movement for Multi-Party Democracy
2015 (by-election)	Teddy Kasonso	United Party for National Development
2016	Teddy Kasonso	United Party for National Development
2021	Nicolas Mukumbi	United Party for National Development
Seat abolished (split into Kalumbila and Lumwana)
