= Mwinilunga West =

National Assembly constituency in Zambia

Mwinilunga West is a constituency of the National Assembly of Zambia. It was created in 2026 when Mwinilunga constituency was split into two constituencies (Mwinilunga West and Mwinilunga East). It covers the western part of Mwinilunga District, including the town of Mwinilunga.

== List of MPs ==
Election year	MP	Party
2026	Jonathan Kapaipi	United Party for National Development
