= Kabompo East =

National Assembly constituency in Zambia

Kabompo East is a constituency of the National Assembly of Zambia. It was created in 2026 when Kabompo constituency was split into two constituencies (Kabompo West and Kabompo East). It covers the eastern part of Kabompo District, including the town o Kabompo.

== List of MPs ==
Election year	MP	Party
2026	Ambrose Lufuma	United Party for National Development
