= Kabompo Ferry =

Coordinates: 14.038409°S 23.629588°E

The Kabompo Ferry is a vehicle pontoon ferry at the Kabompo River near the village of Watopa, approx. 60 km east of the river mouth to Zambezi River. The Kabompo River is dividing the Western and North-Western Provinces of Zambia.

The ferry with a 25-tonne capacity serves the D557 road, a main north-south gravel road connection in western Zambia, from Lukulu, Kaoma and Mongu in Western Province to Kabompo, Zambezi town and Mwinilunga in North-Western Province.

It is a manually powered cable ferry, propelled by pulling on the steel cables which anchor it to each bank of the 100 m wide river. The workers stand on the ferry and use wooden clubs to grasp the cable — each club has a groove cut in it which attaches to the cable and by moving the club like a paddle, half a dozen men can pull the pontoon across the river,
