= Ikeleng'i (constituency) =

Constituency of the National Assembly of Zambia

Ikeleng'i is a constituency of the National Assembly of Zambia. It covers the towns of Ikeleng'i and Kalene Hill in North-Western Province.

The constituency was established in 1973 as Mwinilunga West, and was renamed Ikeleng'i in 2011 after the establishment of Ikelenge District.

== List of MPs ==
Election year	MP	Party
Mwinilunga West
1973	Peter Matoka	United National Independence Party
1978	John Kalenga	United National Independence Party
1983	John Kalenga	United National Independence Party
1988	John Kalenga	United National Independence Party
1991	John Kalenga	Movement for Multi-Party Democracy
1993 (by-election)	Peter Mpashi	Movement for Multi-Party Democracy
1996	Elizabeth Kalenga	Movement for Multi-Party Democracy
2001	Richard Kapita	United Party for National Development
2006	Elijah Muchima	Movement for Multi-Party Democracy
Ikeleng'i
2011	Elijah Muchima	Movement for Multi-Party Democracy
2016	Elijah Muchima	United Party for National Development
2021	Elijah Muchima	United Party for National Development
2026	Paul Masuwa	United Party for National Development
