= Solwezi District =

Coordinates: 12°25′S 26°00′E

- District
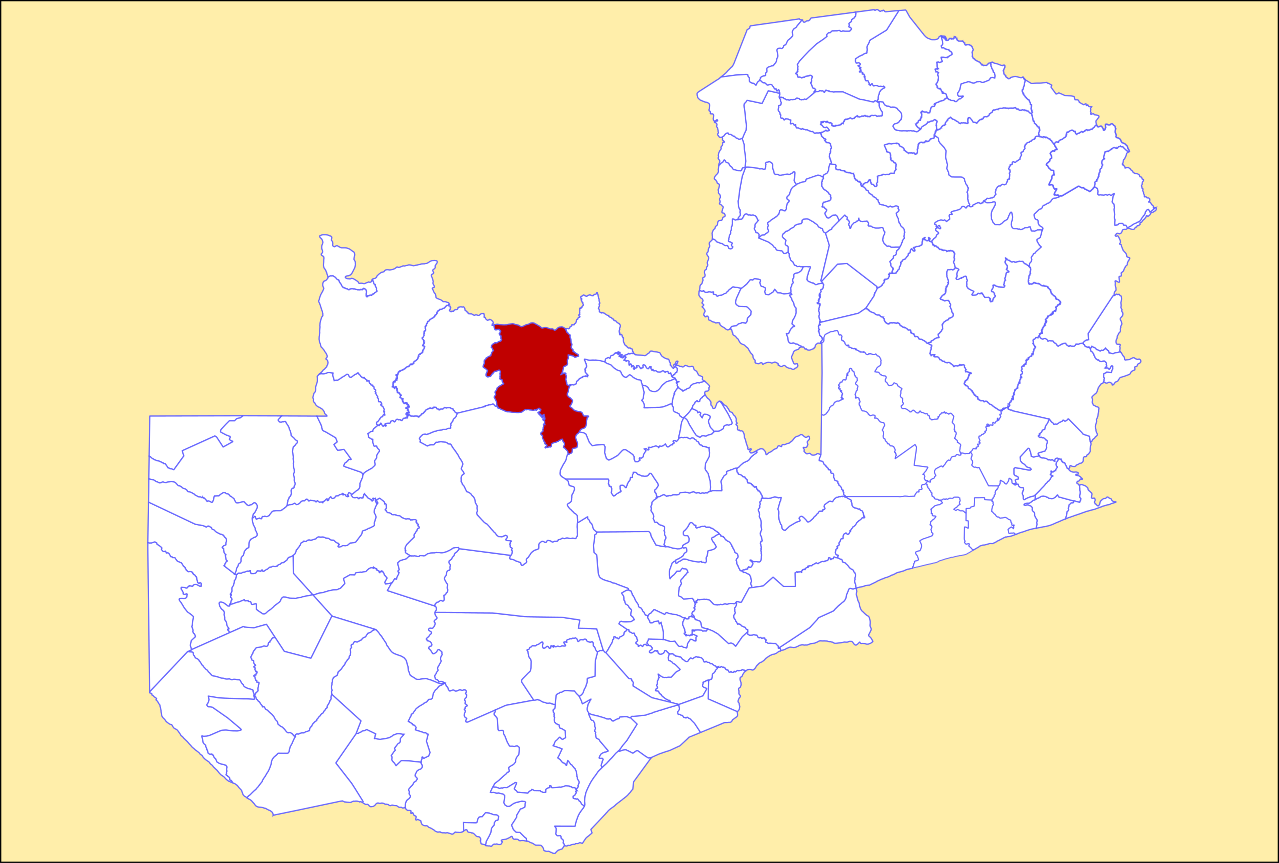
- District location in Zambia
- Country: Zambia
- Province: North-Western Province
- Capital: Solwezi

Area
  - Total: 3,335.8 km^{2} (1,288.0 sq mi)

Population (2022)
  - Total: 332,623
  - Density: 99.713/km^{2} (258.26/sq mi)
- Time zone: UTC+2 (CAT)

Solwezi District is a district of Zambia, located in North-Western Province. The capital lies at Solwezi. As of the 2022 Zambian Census, the district had a population of 332,623 people.

== History ==
Before 2016, the district had three electoral constituencies; namely Solwezi West, Solwezi Central and Solwezi East. But from the 2016 general election going forward, the Solwezi West constituency now constitutes Kalumbila District while the Solwezi East constituency now constitutes Mushindamo District, leaving Solwezi District with only one constituency (Solwezi Central).
