= Zambezi Airport =

Airport in Zambia

- IATA: BBZ; ICAO: FLZB

Summary
- Airport type: Public
- Serves: Zambezi, Zambia
- Elevation AMSL: 3,538 ft / 1,078 m
- Coordinates: 13°32′10″S 23°06′20″E

Map
- Location of the airport in Zambia

Runways
Direction	Length		Surface
Direction	m	ft	Surface
12/30	1,100	3,609	Dirt
- Sources: Google Maps GCM

Zambezi Airport (IATA: BBZ, ICAO: FLZB) is an airport serving the town of Zambezi in the Northwestern Province of Zambia. The airport is within the town, and just east of the Zambezi River.

The Zambezi non-directional beacon (Ident: ZB) is located on the field.

== See also ==
- Transport in Zambia
- List of airports in Zambia
