= Kalumbila (constituency) =

National Assembly constituency in Zambia

Kalumbila is a constituency of the National Assembly of Zambia. It was created in 2026 when Solwezi West was split into two constituencies (Lumwana and Kalumbila). It covers the western part of Kalumbila District, including Kalumbila and Kisasa.

== List of MPs ==
Election year	MP	Party
2026	Nicholas Mukumbi	United Party for National Development
