= Mutanda =

Mutanda may refer to:

- Mutanda, Zambia, a town in Solwezi District, north-western Zambia
- Lake Mutanda, a small freshwater lake in Uganda.
- Mutanda Mine, an open-pit copper mine in the Katanga Province of the Democratic Republic of the Congo
