= Mwinilunga East =

National Assembly constituency in Zambia

Mwinilunga East is a constituency of the National Assembly of Zambia. It was created in 2026 when Mwinilunga constituency was split into two (Mwinilunga East and Mwinilunga West). It covers the eastern part of Mwinilunga District.

== List of MPs ==
Election year	MP	Party
2026	Mukanzu Lualaba	United Party for National Development
