= Mufumbwe =

- Location in Zambia
- Coordinates: 13°41′00″S 24°48′00″E
- Country: Zambia
- Province: North-Western Province
- District: Mufumbwe District
- Time zone: UTC+2 (CAT)

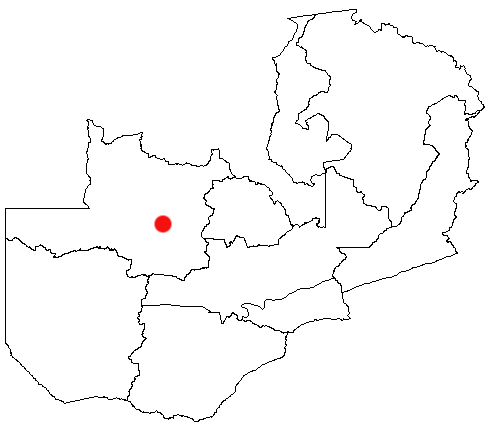
Location of Kasempa in Zambia

Mufumbwe is a town of Mufumbwe District in the North-Western Province of Zambia. It is located at 13°41'0S 24°48'0E with an altitude of 1069 metres (3510 feet).

The main economic activity of the town is agriculture, with most of the population being involved in small-scale farming. The main crop grown in the area is maize. Most households in Mufumbwe maintain a year-round stock of maize which they use to make maize meal. Maize meal, (“bunga” in Kikaonde) is combined with boiling water to make nshima, the staple national food.

The District has two chiefdoms: Chizela and Mushima. There are a total of 16 wards, namely Kashima west, Kashima East, Matushi, Munyambala, Kamabuta, Kalambo (Township), Chizela, Shukwe, Kikonge, Kalengwa, Kabipupu, Musonweji, Kaminzekenzeke, Mushima, Lalafuta and Miluji.
