= Chilekwa Mumba =

Zambian environmental activist

- Born: 1984 or 1985 (age 40–41); Chingola, Zambia
- Occupation(s): Community organizer, environmental activist, orphanage manager
- Known for: Organizing a successful lawsuit against Vedanta Resources for environmental damage
- Awards: Goldman Environmental Prize (2023)

Chilekwa Mumba (born 1984 or 1985) is a Zambian community organizer and environmental activist. He is known for having organized a successful lawsuit against UK-based mining company Vedanta Resources, owner of the subsidiary Konkola Copper Mines in Zambia's Copperbelt Province, in response to pollution and environmental damage. It was the first time that an English court decided that a British company could be held responsible for environmental harm caused by its subsidiaries operating in another country.

In 2023, Mumba became a recipient of the Goldman Environmental Prize.

== Personal life ==
Mumba grew up in Chingola in Copperbelt Province, Zambia. His father was a miner before becoming a Pentecostal minister.

In April 2023, Mumba was noted to be running an orphanage with his wife in Lusaka, Zambia's capital.
