= Chavuma District =

Coordinates: 13°12′S 22°23′E

- District
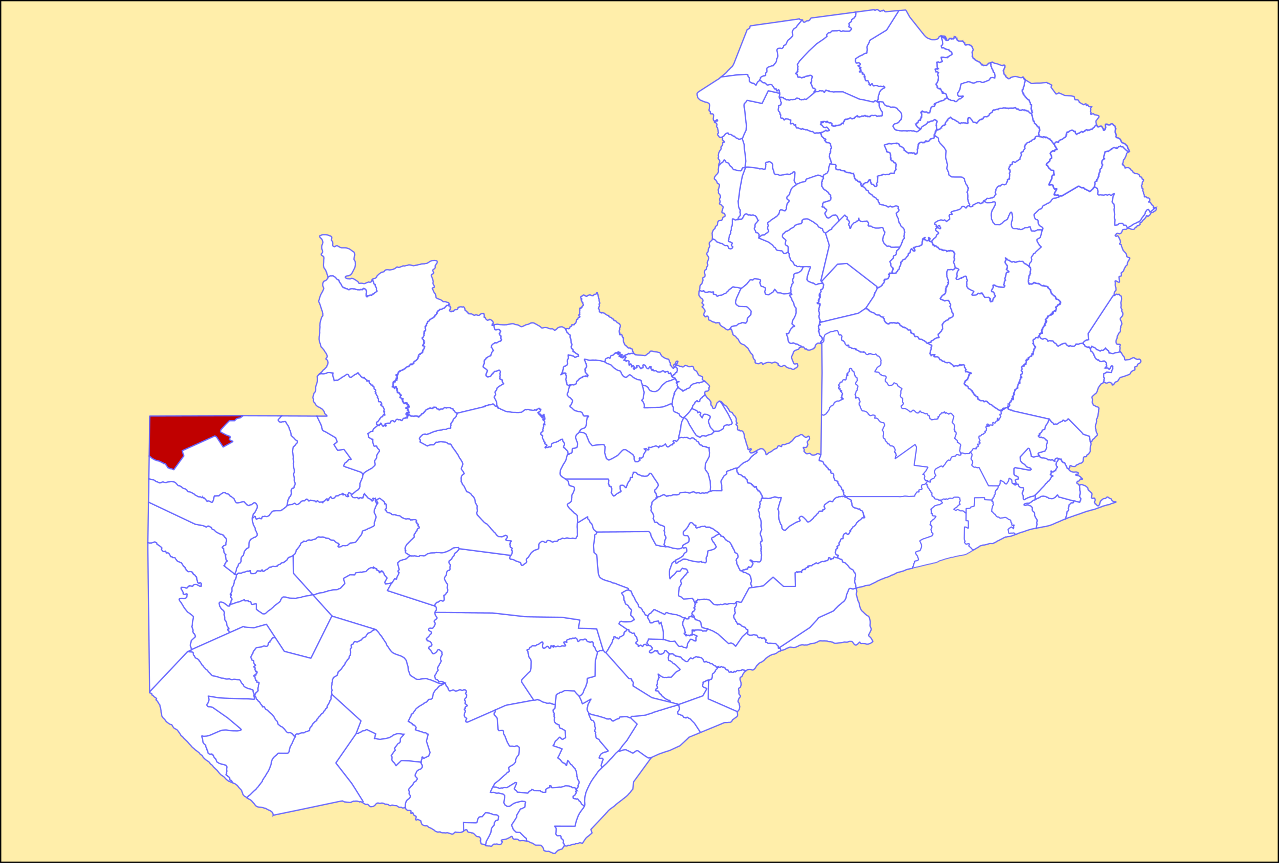
- District location in Zambia
- Country: Zambia
- Province: North-Western Province
- Capital: Chavuma

Area
  - Total: 4,924.1 km^{2} (1,901.2 sq mi)

Population (2022)
  - Total: 54,959
  - Density: 11.161/km^{2} (28.907/sq mi)
- Time zone: UTC+2 (CAT)

Chavuma District is a district of Zambia, located in North-Western Province. The capital lies at Chavuma. As of the 2022 Zambian Census, the district had a population of 54,959 people.
