= Elijah Muchima =

Zambian politician

Minister of Lands and Natural Resources
- In office 7 September 2021 – 21 July 2024
- President: Hakainde Hichilema
- Preceded by: Jean Kapata
- Succeeded by: Sylvia Masebo

Minister of Health
- In office 22 July 2024 – 19 February 2026
- Preceded by: Sylvia Masebo
- Succeeded by: Alex Katakwe

Member of the National Assembly for Ikeleng'i
- In office 2006 – 15 May 2026
- Preceded by: Richard Kapita

Personal details
- Born: 26 May 1957 (age 69) Lusaka, Zambia
- Party: United Party for National Development
- Education: University of Zambia
- Occupation: Politician

Elijah Julaki Muchima (born 26 May 1957) is a Zambian politician. He was the member of parliament for Ikeleng'i Constituency from 2006 to 2026. He is a member of the United Party for National Development (UPND). He holds a certificate in Law (UK), diploma in Accountancy (ZDA) and Form V. He served as the Minister of Lands and Natural Resources from 7 September 2021 up to 21 July 2024 and as the Minister of Health from 22 July 2024 up to 19 February 2026.

After 20 years of being the member of parliament for Ikeleng'i, Muchima announced on 13 May 2026 that he will not participate in the 2026 general election.
