= Enoch Kavindele =

Zambian politician

7th Vice-President of Zambia
- In office 4 May 2001 – 29 May 2003
- President: Frederick Chiluba and Levy Mwanawasa
- Preceded by: Christon Tembo
- Succeeded by: Nevers Mumba

Minister of Health
- In office 2000–2001
- Succeeded by: Levison Mumba

Minister of Commerce Trade and Industry
- In office 1997–1995

Minister of Science and Technology
- In office 1996–1997

Member of the National Assembly for Kabompo West
- In office 2002–2006
- Preceded by: Daniel Kalenga
- Succeeded by: Daniel Kalenga

Member of the National Assembly for Chingola
- In office 1995–2001
- Preceded by: Ludwing Sondashi
- Succeeded by: Severine Chilufya

Member of the National Assembly for Chingola
- In office 1987–?

Personal details
- Born: 7 July 1950 (age 75)
- Political party: UNIP, UDP, MMD
- Profession: Business man

Enoch P. Kavindele (born 7 July 1950) is a Zambian businessman and politician who served as the seventh vice-president of Zambia from 2001 until 2003.

== Biography ==
Kavindele began his business career in the 1970s when he established Woodgate Holdings. He was originally a member of the United National Independence Party (UNIP) and was elected to the National Assembly in the Chingola constituency in a by-election in 1987. In 1991 he launched a leadership challenge to Kenneth Kaunda, but withdrew after receiving little support. He was the UNIP candidate in Chingola in the 1991 general elections, but was heavily defeated by Ludwig Sondashi of the Movement for Multi-Party Democracy (MMD). In 1992 he left UNIP to form the United Democratic Party, which gained several seats on local councils. However, he later dissolved the party the following year and joined the MMD.

A by-election was held in Chingola in 1995 after Sondashi defected to the National Party and Kavindele was chosen as the MMD candidate. After winning the by-election with 86% of the vote, he became a member of the National Assembly again. He retained the seat in the 1996 general elections with a 14,000 majority. He was subsequently removed from Minister of Science and Technology. In 1997 he was moved to become Minister of Commerce Trade and Industry. However, he was sacked in September 1998.

Kavindele was appointed Minister of Health in 2000, a post he held until being appointed Vice-President in 2001 by President Frederick Chiluba. In the December 2001 general elections he ran as the MMD candidate in Kabompo West. He defeated the incumbent MP Daniel Kalenga and was elected with a majority of 1,756. He was removed from his post of Vice-President by new President Levy Mwanawasa in May 2003.

Prior to the 2006 general elections, Kavindele was not selected as the MMD candidate for Kabompo West and was replaced by former opponent Daniel Kalenga. He contested the elections as an independent, giving up his MMD membership, but was defeated by Kalenga by over 2,000 votes.

Kavindele later became Chair of the North-Western Railway Company.
