= Elias Munshya =

Zambian diplomat

Ambassador Elias Munshya

High Commissioner of Zambia to Australia and New Zealand
- In office June 2022 – October 2025

Ambassador Extraordinary and Plenipotentiary of Zambia to Angola
- Incumbent
- Assumed office October 2025

Personal details
- Born: 28 September 1978 (age 48) Chiwempala, Chingola, Zambia
- Party: United Party for National Development
- Education: Northwestern University Pritzker School of Law; Northumbria University School of Law; South Affrican Theological Seminary; Ambrose University; Providence University; Global University; Eswatini College of Theology;

Elias Munshya (born 28 September 1978) is a Zambian lawyer, politician, ordained minister, political theologian and diplomat who currently serves as Zambia's Ambassador to Angola. He was appointed by President Hakainde Hichilema to the position in October 2025 after previously serving for 3 and half years as the High Commissioner for Zambia to Australia and New Zealand based in Canberra, Australia.

== Early life ==
Munshya was born in 1978 in Chiwempala Township in the mining town of Chingola. He attended among other schools, Mpezeni Park Primary School in Chipata and Konkola Primary School in Chililabombwe. In 1996, he completed high school at Chingola Secondary School.

== Education and career ==
Munshya has a BA in theology degree, a law degree, an MBA and a PhD in political theology. He holds 8 qualifications from different institutions.

Munshya moved to Canada from Zambia where he was called to the Alberta Bar on 3 May 2016 after a rigorous bar admission process. Since then, he has practiced in Calgary, Alberta as a civil litigator. In 2018, he represented the family of Bolanle Alo, a Nigerian national who died after an altercation with Canadian border agents on a plane at Calgary International Airport. At the time of his death, Alo was being deported from Canada to Nigeria. Munshya was a Vice chair of the Personal Injury section of the Canadian Bar Association and board member of the Alberta Civil Trial Association.

In 2022, he was appointed by Zambian President Hakainde Hichilema to serve as Zambia's envoy to Australia and New Zealand. On his credence presentation to Australia's Governor-General, he wore a traditional attire, which earned him praise from Africans for culture in practice.

In October 2025, he was transferred to Angola, as Ambassador Exraordinary and Plenipotentiary.

== Books ==
1. Church and State in Zambia: an evangelical perspective, published by Verlag für Kultur und Wissenschaft, Bonn 2024 (https://vkwonline.com/Church-and-State-Relations-in-Zambia)
