= Kalumbila Mine =

Copper mine in North-Western, Zambia

- Location: Kalumbila District, Zambia
- Products: Copper
- Type: Open Pit
- Company: FQM Trident Limited - 100% owned by First Quantum Minerals

Kalumbila Mine is a copper mine in Kalumbila District, North-Western Province, Zambia (west of Solwezi). It was formed in 2010 and is one of the four copper mines in Zambia. As of 2018, it was the fourth largest mining employer in Zambia with 11 000 workers. Kalumbila is also the name of the town where the mine is situated.

== Timeline ==
In 2020, the mine achieved record copper production of 251,216 tonnes, delivering a significant increase in throughput and operating at record low unit cash cost of $1.40 per lb.

In February 2022, the operator Kalumbila Minerals Ltd ("Sentinel") changed its trading name to FQM Trident Limited, that incorporates the mining firm’s identity as a 100% First Quantum Minerals-owned company.

== Operations ==
Kalumbila currently mills 3 million tons of copper ore per year. The company's Solwezi Deep Mining Project will expand its capacity to 6 million tons of ore per year.

By 2020, the recorded Copper Ore milled was over 56 million tonnes, an increase of over 7 million tonnes from the previous year. The Copper ore grade processed was 0.49% at 90% Copper recovery.

Its exports are transported to the ports of Dar es Salaam in Tanzania, Durban in South Africa and Walvis Bay in Namibia. Principal markets include the Middle East and East Asia. Metal is also sold domestically, to Metal Fabricators of Zambia (ZAMEFA).

== See also ==
- Copper mining and extraction
- Economy of Zambia
- List of Companies in Zambia
- Mining in Zambia
