= Mutanda, Zambia =

Mutanda
- Town
- Location of Mutanda in Zambia
- Coordinates: 12°24′00″S 26°14′24″E
- Country: Zambia
- Province: North-Western Province
- District: Kalumbila District
- Elevation: 4,300 ft (1,300 m)

Population (2010 (Estimate))
  - Total: 2,000
- Climate: Cwa

Mutanda is a town in Kalumbila District, North-Western Province, Zambia. It is approximately 33 kilometres (21 mi), by road, southwest of Solwezi. Mutanda is situated approximately 500 kilometres (310 mi), by road, northwest of Lusaka, the capital.

== Population ==
As of December 2010, the population of Mutanda is estimated to be about 2,000 people.

== Landmarks ==
In Mutanda, or near its borders, there are the following landmarks:

- Mutanda Evangelical Mission
- Mutanda Mini Hydropower Station - 2kW
- Mutanda Electricity Utility Company
- The junction of Chingola-Ikelenge Highway (T5 Road) with the Zambezi-Mutanda Highway (M8 Road)
- Mutanda River - The river runs through the town, dividing it into East Mutanda and West Mutanda.
- Mutanda Hospital
- Mutanda High School - Mixed, residential high school
- Mutanda Primary School - Mixed, elementary non-residential school
