= Mushindamo =

Constituency of the National Assembly of Zambia

Mushindamo is a constituency of the National Assembly of Zambia. It covers Mushindamo District of North-Western Province. Prior to the 2026 election, it was known as Solwezi East.

== List of MPs ==
Election year	MP	Party
Solwezi East
1973	Tito Kibolya	United National Independence Party
1978	Ludwig Sondashi	United National Independence Party
1983	Ludwig Sondashi	United National Independence Party
1988	Humphrey Mulemba	United National Independence Party
1991	Shiabyungwe Shengamo	Movement for Multi-Party Democracy
1996	Patrick Kangwa	National Party
2001	Patrick Kangwa	United Party for National Development
2006	Richard Taima	Movement for Multi-Party Democracy
2011	Richard Taima	Movement for Multi-Party Democracy
2013 (by-election)	Villie Lombanya	United Party for National Development
2016	Leaky Kintu	United Party for National Development
2021	Alex Katakwe	United Party for National Development
Mushindamo
2026	Alex Katakwe	United Party for National Development
