= Zambezi District =

Coordinates: 13°30′S 22°45′E

- District
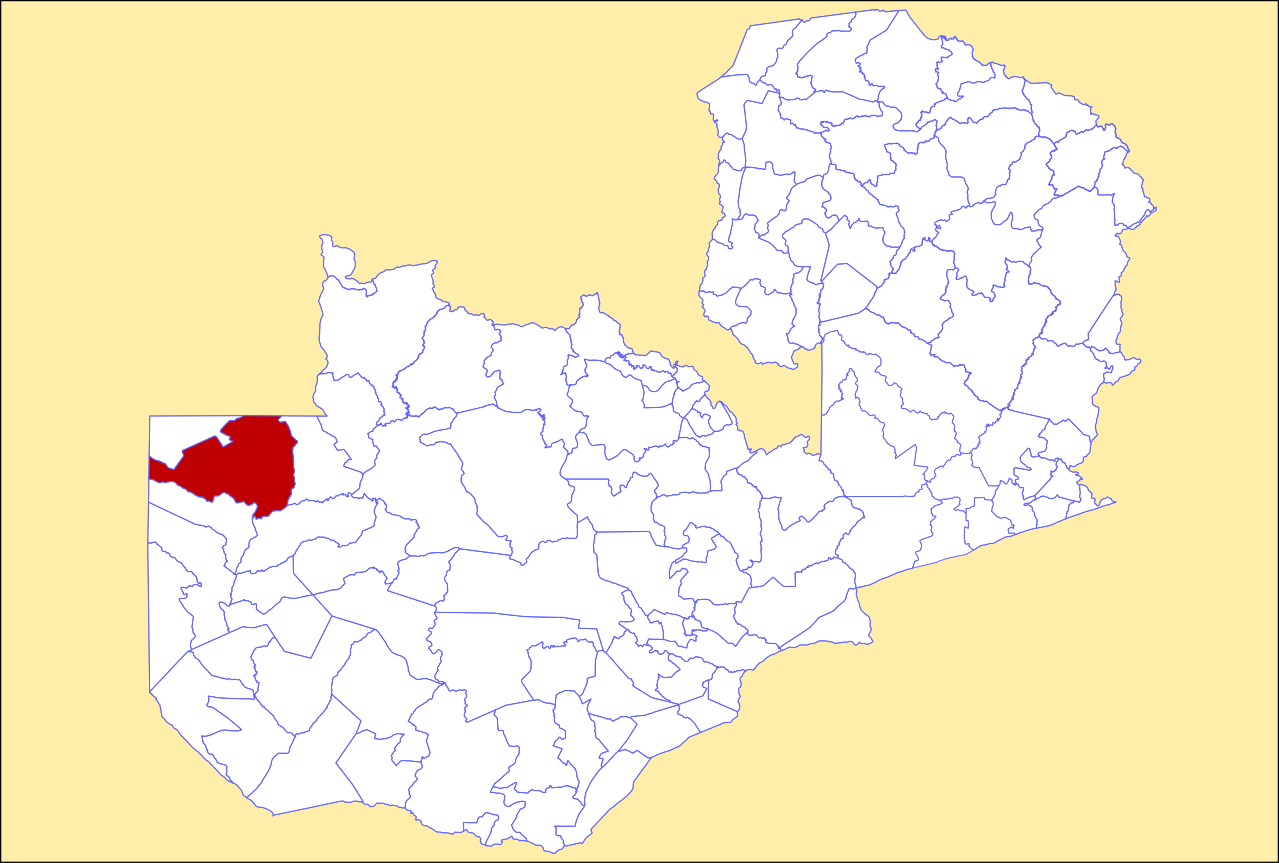
- District location in Zambia
- Country: Zambia
- Province: North-Western Province
- Capital: Zambezi

Area
  - Total: 14,171.6 km^{2} (5,471.7 sq mi)

Population (2022)
  - Total: 108,220
  - Density: 7.6364/km^{2} (19.778/sq mi)
- Time zone: UTC+2 (CAT)

Zambezi District is a district of Zambia, located in North-Western Province. The capital lies at Zambezi. As of the 2022 Zambian Census, the district had a population of 108,220 people. It consists of two constituencies, namely Zambezi West and Zambezi East.
