= Chingola =

City in Copperbelt Province, Zambia

- Town
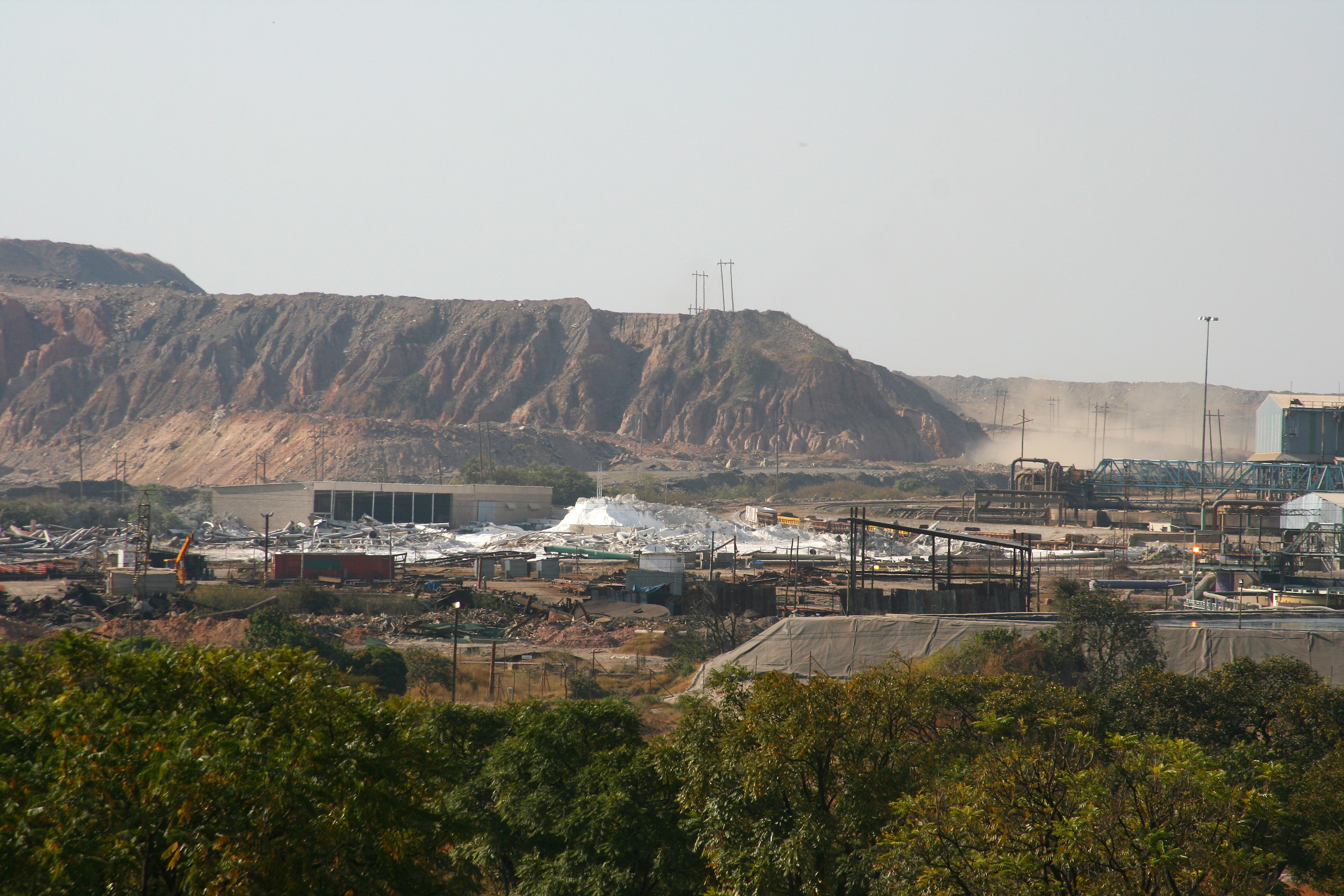
- Nchanga copper mine near Chingola

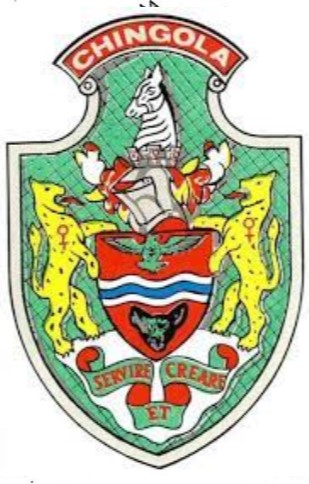
- Seal

- Location in Zambia
- Coordinates: 12°32′S 27°51′E
- Country: Zambia
- Province: Copperbelt Province
- District: Chingola District
- Elevation: 4,472 ft (1,363 m)

Population (2022 Census)
  - Total: 256,560
- Time zone: UTC+2 (CAT)
- Climate: Cwa
- Website: Chingola Municipal Council

Chingola is a town in Zambia's Copperbelt Province, the country's copper-mining region, with a population of 256,560 (2022 census). It is the home of Nchanga Copper Mine, a deep-shaft high-grade content copper mining operation, which subsequently (in the 1960s) led to the development of two open pit operations, Chingola Open Pit and then Nchanga Open Pit (the latter being the second largest open cast mine in the world).

== History ==
Chingola was founded in 1943, somewhat later than most other Copperbelt Province towns. Chingola was built to service the newly opened Nchanga Copper mine.

== Demographics ==
Census	Population
1990	142,383
2000	147,448
2010	185,246
2022	256,560

== Mines ==
Situated at the north-west end of the Copperbelt Province, the Nchanga Mines Open Pit workings lie in an arc 11 km long around the west and north of the town, covering nearly 30 km^{2}. The deepest part of the pit is 400 m lower than the surrounding plateau.

The Mimbula Copper Project is a copper rich oxide and sulphide deposit, located on the outskirts of the town of Chingola on a mining licence held by Moxico Resources’ Zambian unit. Moxico Resources is a development and exploration mining company incorporated in the UK. In 2021, Moxico Resources began construction of a 10,000 tonne Leach Pad, Solvent Extraction and Electrowinning Plant. The Plant is expected to be operational by Q2 2022 and is planned to be expanded in phases.

== Communications ==
A freight-only branch of Zambian Railways services the town from Kitwe. The branch includes the movement of copper ore to the smelters at Nkana in Kitwe.

Chingola is on the main Copperbelt Highway (the T3 road) running north to Lubumbashi in DR Congo via Chililabombwe and Konkola and running south-east to Kapiri Mposhi via Kitwe and Ndola. It is also at the start of the T5 road, running west-north-west to a border with Angola via Solwezi and Mwinilunga.

Chingola is served by Kasompe Airport, (IATA code: CGJ). It is also served by 2 shopping malls: The Park Mall and the Motherland Shopping Mall.

== Public facilities ==
Nchanga Rangers Football Club is the town's largest soccer club and hosts games at the Nchanga Stadium located in the Nchanga North suburb.

== Features of Chingola ==
=== National Monument ===
- Hippo Pool on the Kafue River, 10 km north, established as a National Monument in 1954.

=== Other features ===
- Chimfunshi Wildlife Orphanage, a sanctuary for orphaned chimpanzees, lies 60 km north-west of Chingola.
- "Five Mile Rock", about 8 kilometres from Chingola on the right hand side of the T3 road to Kitwe, is a popular landmark.

== Notable people born in Chingola ==
- Felix Bwalya (1967–1997), boxer
- Patson Daka (born 1998), footballer
- Samuel Matete (born 1968), athlete
- Chilekwa Mumba (born 1984/1985), environmental activist
- Elias Munshya (born 1978), diplomat
- The Most Rev. Richard Moth (born 1958), Archbishop of Westminster since February 2026.
- Fackson Kapumbu (born 1990), Zambian soccer player
