= Equinox Minerals =

International mining company

Equinox Minerals Limited
- Type: Public
- Industry: Mining
- Founded: 1993
- Founder: Craig Williams
- Defunct: 2011
- Fate: merger
- Headquarters: Toronto, Perth, Canada Australia
- Key people: Peter Tomsett CHAIR; Craig Williams PRES, CEO; David McAusland DIR
- Products: Gold, copper, cobalt, uranium
- Revenue: C$1,046.787 mil 2010▲96.8%
- Net income: ▲C$269.105 mil 2010 over loss of 183 mil in '09
- Total assets: C$3,246.76 mil Dec'10 ▲96% qoq
- Total equity: ▲C$1,931.01 mil 2010
- Number of employees: 179 (December 2010)
- Divisions: Zambia (LMC)
- Website: www.equinoxminerals.com

Equinox Minerals is a mining and exploration company with corporate offices in Perth, Australia and Toronto, Ontario, Canada. It has operations in Peru and Australia. In Zambia it owned the Lumwana Mining Company, but that was bought by Barrick Gold in 2011. Through Liontown Resources Limited and Alturas Minerals Corp., the company has gold and copper-gold exploration interests in Peru and Australia. The Lumwana project which had enough reserves to be productive for 37 years, cost the company one billion dollars to develop. In Zambia it has been credited with supporting social development through projects which aim to build schools, attract professionals to areas around its mine sites. 2010 copper production was 323.4 million pounds (146,690 tonnes) 68% higher than in 2009 (192.1 million pounds).

The company produced slightly more copper than it sells (In 2010 323.4 vs 290.2 million pounds up from 2009 when it was 290.42 vs 179.72 million pounds), 77% of production occurred during the first nine months of the year (production was 113 kt, sales were 98kt); capital expenditure amounted to $66 million. In September 2010 company debt was $433 million, long term debt fell significantly in the last quarter of 2010 from $422 million down to $295.57 million. Even though Equinox doesn't produce gold Barrick Gold, the world's largest gold company (both in terms of reserves and production) acquired Equinox Minerals in April 2011; the deal will lower the fraction of revenue Barrick receives from the sale of gold to 80%.

== History ==
The company formed after a merger between Equinox and Equinox Resources in January, 2004, and was incorporated the same month as a Canadian company. It began operations in Zambia in 1996. Prior to being acquired by Equinox in 1999 at least 10 different companies failed in their attempts to develop the Lumwana project, which covers 2 major copper mines and 1355 km squared in area. In 2010 Equinox was involved in a couple major transactions; first it acquired the Jabal Sayid copper-gold-silver project 350 km from Jeddah, Saudi Arabia, capable of producing 2.6 million tons of ore per year starting in 2012. In February it launched a $4.8 billion hostile takeover bid for copper producer Lundin Mining, at the same time Lundin was attempting its own takeover ($9 billion Inmet Mining merger which would result in the creation of Symterra Corp). (As of April 2011 none of those deals have been finalized, combination with Lundin Mining would raise Equinox production growth rate 23%). In April 2011, Equinox rejected a takeover offer by China Minmetals, but later accepted a bid by Barrick Gold. On April 25, 2011, Barrick Gold Corporation announced the acquisition of Equinox for $7.69 billion.

== Exploration projects ==
- Zambezi - coal
- Chapi Chapi-Utupara, Sombrero, Caccapaqui and the Huajoto - copper, gold, silver, zinc
- Lumwana (2 open pit mines, both are sulphide ore deposits. - 5.97 billion pounds of copper, 7 billion pounds of copper inferred., 16 million pounds of uranium, gold
  - Malundwe, Chimiwungo - First quarter 2010 production of copper on pace to meet the 135,000 tonne expectation for the year. Fairfax estimates that production will be 172,000 tons for the first five years.

== See also ==
- Copper extraction techniques
- Economy of Zambia, Solwezi
- Zambia Consolidated Copper Mines
