= Stafford Mulusa =

Zambian politician

Elected member of the National Assembly of Zambia
- In office August 2016 – May 2026
- Preceded by: Dawson Kafwaya
- Succeeded by: Kawina Poho
- Constituency: Solwezi Central
- Incumbent
- Assumed office 15 August 2026
- Constituency: Solwezi North

Personal details
- Born: 5 February 1975 (age 51)
- Profession: Businessman, Politician

Stafford Mulusa (born 5 February 1975) is a Zambian businessman and politician who is currently the member of parliament for Solwezi North. He has served as the Government Chief Whip in the National Assembly of Zambia since August 2021. He represented the Solwezi Central constituency in parliament as a member of the United Party for National Development (UPND) from 2016 to 2026.

== Early life and career ==
Mulusa holds a qualification in business management with experience as a businessman outside of politics.

== Political career ==
Mulusa was first elected to represent Solwezi Central in the 2016 general election as the UPND candidate and was re-elected at the 2021 general election. Upon his return to parliament, he was appointed Government Chief Whip, responsible for managing government business and legislative agenda within the Assembly. He has held active roles on key parliamentary committees, including the House Business Committee, Committee on Privileges and Absences, and the Standing Orders Committee.

Ahead of the 2026 general election, Solwezi Central was split into two constituencies (Solwezi Central and Solwezi North). Mulusa decided to stand as the UPND candidate in Solwezi North and he was elected.

== Community engagement ==
In January 2024, MP Mulusa announced that the government had allocated K2.4 million for the construction of a concrete bridge over the Mutanda River in his constituency, emphasizing the critical need for improved infrastructure to support schooling and commerce.

He also engaged with community stakeholders during the Kansanshi Mine expansion, highlighting job creation, environmental stewardship, and local contractor participation.

== Advocacy and public statements ==
In April 2022, Mulusa forecast that the UPND would remain in power for over 20 years, citing the effective implementation of the Constituency Development Fund (CDF) and widespread rural support.

He has also publicly condemned misinformation propagated by opposition parties and encouraged media responsibility and parliamentary decorum. In June 2025, he criticized disruptive behavior by MPs in the chamber, stating such conduct gives a poor example to young people and undermines parliamentary discipline.

== Road traffic incident ==
In September 2023, Stafford Mulusa was involved in a serious road accident alongside Permanent Secretary Naomi Tetamashimba. The vehicle was struck by another car, resulting in injuries to both officials. They were treated at Kabwe Central Hospital and later transferred to University Teaching Hospital in Lusaka.
