= Benny Tetamashimba =

Zambian politician

Honourable Benny Tetamashimba MP

Minister of Local Government and Housing
- In office 14 November 2008 – 5 September 2009
- President: Rupiah Banda
- Preceded by: Sylvia Masebo

Deputy Minister of Works and Supply
- In office 9 October 2006 – 29 March 2008
- Preceded by: Kennedy Shepande
- Succeeded by: Mundia Ndalemei

Member of Parliament for Solwezi Central
- In office December 2001 – 5 September 2009
- Preceded by: Ludwig Sondashi
- Succeeded by: Watson Lumba

Personal details
- Born: 27 July 1955 Mulimbi village, Mumena, North-Western Province, Zambia
- Died: 5 September 2009 (aged 54) University Teaching Hospital, Lusaka, Zambia
- Party: Movement for Multi-Party Democracy

Benny Tetamashimba was a Zambian Movement for Multiparty Democracy (MMD) politician and had been a Member of Parliament for Solwezi Central from 2001 to 2009 when he died. Tetamashimba was a member of United Party for National Development prior to joining the MMD.

== Hospital and death ==
Tetamashimba was evacuated to South Africa for specialist treatment on August 9, 2009. On September 3, 2009, it was reported that Tetamashimba had been brought back to University Teaching Hospital in Lusaka, Zambia in critical condition and was unable to speak. On September 5, it was reported that Tetamashimba had died at 18:30hrs, GMT.
