= Chavuma =

- Town
- Location in Zambia
- Coordinates: 13°04′00″S 22°41′00″E
- Country: Zambia
- Province: North-Western Province
- District: Chavuma District
- Time zone: UTC+2 (CAT)

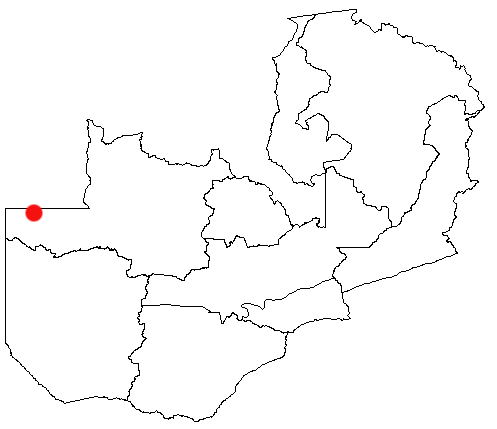
Location of Chavuma in Zambia

Chavuma is a town in the North-Western Province of Zambia, lying immediately south of the border with Angola. The town is approximately 1,100 kilometers from Lusaka (capital city of Zambia) and 11 kilometers from the Angolan border town of Kalipande. It lies on the Zambezi River. Local attractions include the Chavuma Falls, while a market takes place on the border, permitting people from both nations to trade.

== Brief history ==
Chavuma has a population of fewer than 35,000 mostly from the Lunda on the east, with Luvale people on the west, centrally due to movement of people from west side to east, the CBD is of both Lundas and Luvales, who are mostly subsistence farmers and fishermen. The Chavuma area has rich traditions, with the history of the Lunda people dating way back as 1837 the last reign of Chief Ikalawanda Musheta Mpindi with his palace at Manzeki. The Lunda chiefs ruled the east Chavuma up to 1950 when Chief Chisamba Willie Musheta was succeeded by Luweji Nkondi Lyonivwa. It was during the reign of Luweji Nkondi Lyonivwa that the protests arose from the Luvale majority, that in 1962 Mwanti Yamva intervened and recalled Luweji to restore peace and the land remained under the rule of Senior Chief Ishindi. Chavuma district as of today is a wide area that cover a large land divided by the Zambezi river. The Zambezi river has been marked as a traditional boundary between the major two ethnic groups; the luvale and the Lunda. The Luvale Royal establishment has it marks, tracks and palaces on the west of the Zambezi river, and land rich with fish, sugarcane and good land for rice farming.on the other hand the Lunda Royal establishment ethnic group has its marks, tracks and palaces on the east of the river. Despite these boundaries the people of these two major groups live together on any area without interfering in the jurisdiction of the other traditional political boundary. The land has a rich cultural and traditional practice of the Lunda and the Luvale people which includes the Makishi dancers, Mwali, and chilende of the Luvale on the west bank of Chavuma district. With relative peace in Angola there is much cross-border trade.

Chavuma also has an American mission school and hospital (Christian Mission in Many Lands) which was built in the 1900s.
