= Kabompo West =

National Assembly constituency in Zambia

Kabompo West is a constituency of the National Assembly of Zambia. It was created in 2026 when Kabompo constituency was split into two constituencies (Kabompo West and Kabompo East). It covers the western part of Kabompo District.

== List of MPs ==
Election year	MP	Party
2026	Hilary Chipango	United Party for National Development
