= Mufumbwe District =

Coordinates: 13°46′S 25°09′E

- District
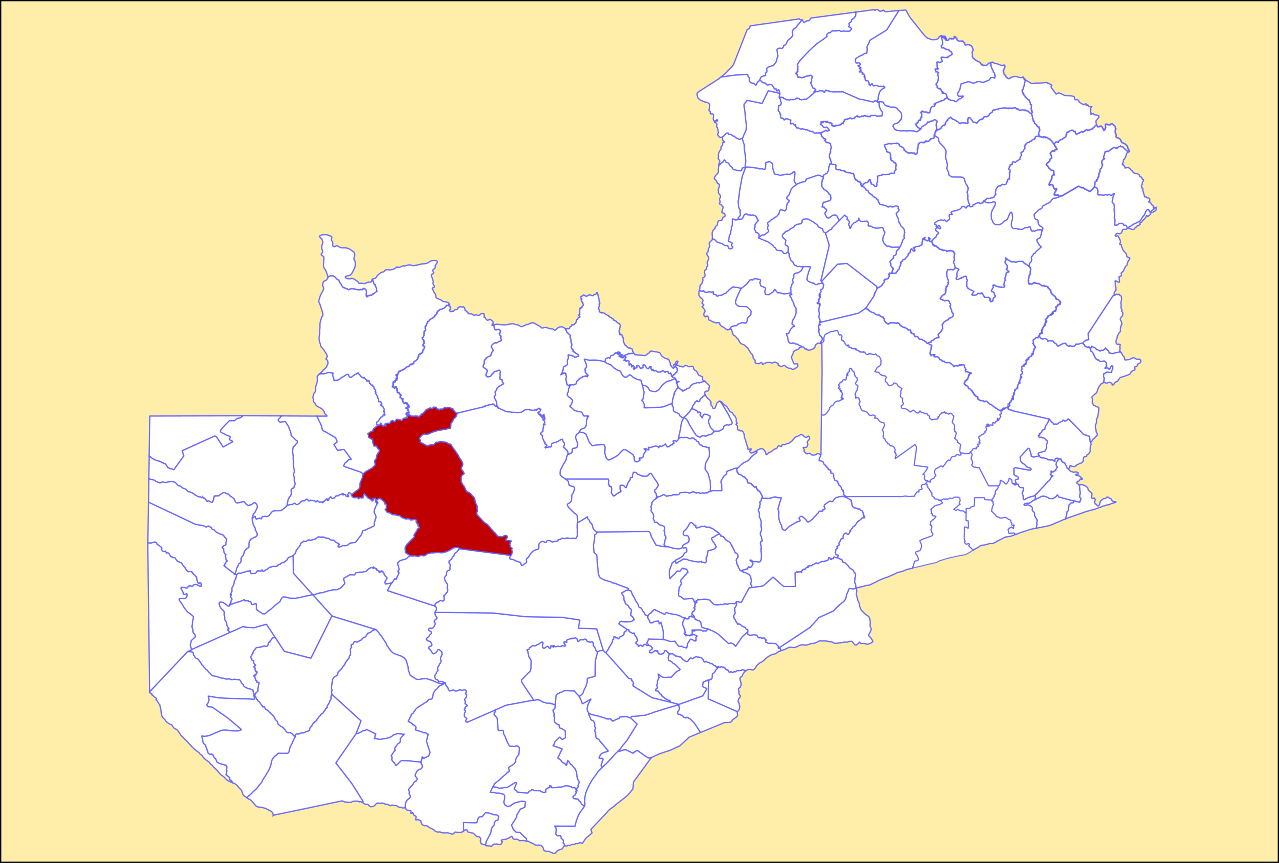
- District location in Zambia
- Country: Zambia
- Province: North-Western Province
- Capital: Mufumbwe

Area
  - Total: 18,941.6 km^{2} (7,313.4 sq mi)

Population (2022)
  - Total: 98,217
  - Density: 5.1853/km^{2} (13.430/sq mi)
- Time zone: UTC+2 (CAT)

Mufumbwe District is a district of Zambia, located in North-Western Province. The capital lies at Mufumbwe. As of the 2022 Zambian Census, the district had a population of 98,217 people.
