= Caianda =

Town in Moxico province, Angola

Coordinates: 11°00′S 23°32′E

Location of Caianda

Caianda is a town in Moxico Leste Province, which is in the northeastern part of Angola, adjacent to the border with the Democratic Republic of the Congo.

== Location ==
The town is a few kilometers from Zambia. It is located on the road between Luena, the capital of Moxico Province, and Mwinilunga in Zambia.

== Recent history ==
In 2004, the United Nations High Commission for Refugees (UNHCR) began organising the repatriation of over 71,000 Angolan refugees from Zambia. The first refugees returned by air, but a new land corridor from Zambia via Caianda for remaining refugees.

The refugees left Angola beginning in 1974 during the fighting between UNITA and MPLA forces.
