= Kabompo River =

Tributary of the upper Zambezi River

Coordinates: 13°35′00″S 24°13′50″E

Kabompo
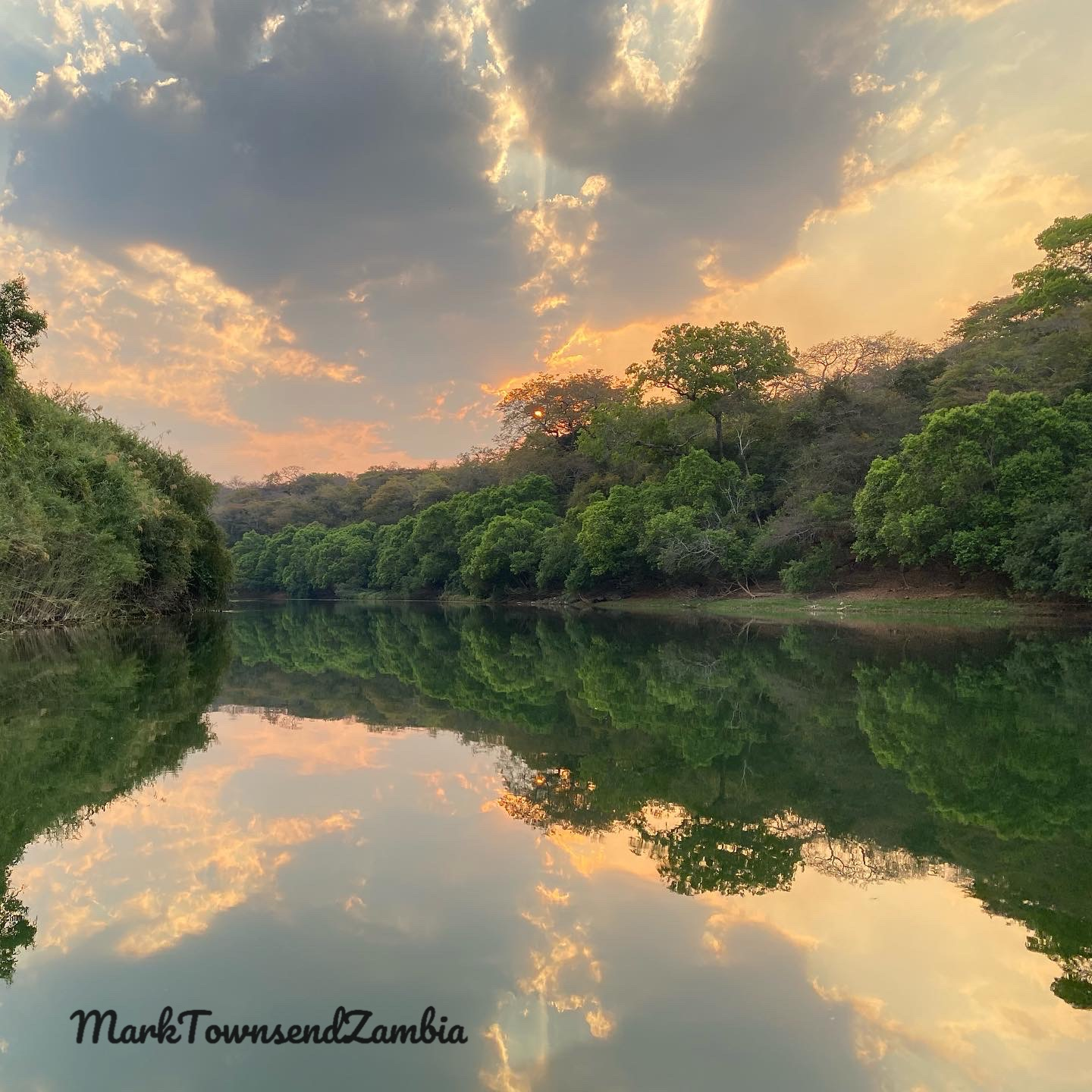

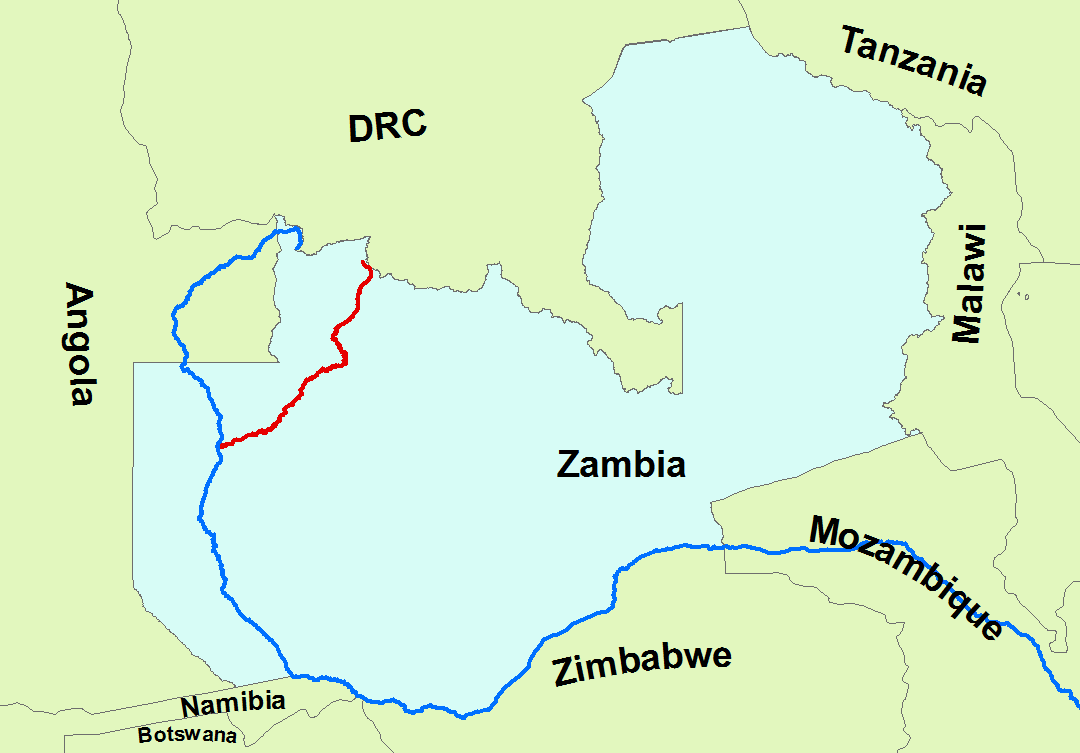
- Kabompo River (red) and part of the Zambezi River (blue)

Location
- Country: Zambia
- Region: North-Western Province, Zambia

Physical characteristics
- Mouth: Zambezi
  - location: near Lukulu, Zambia
- Length: 730 km (450 mi)

Basin features
- River system: Zambezi

The Kabompo River is one of the main tributaries of the upper Zambezi River. It flows entirely in Zambia, rising to the east of the source of the Zambezi, in North-Western Province. It is rumoured to be the second deepest river in Africa and one of the top five in the world, although substantiated records of river depth are yet to be published.

== Geography ==
The Kabompo River flows south-west through miombo woodland, then a remote Cryptosepalum dry forest ecoregion, with the West Lunga National Park on its west bank. After flowing past the town of Kabompo, it develops a swampy floodplain up to 5 km wide. The Kabompo Ferry on its lower course carries the main north–south gravel highway on the eastern side of the Zambezi. The river enters the Zambezi north of the town of Lukulu, at the north end of the Barotse Floodplain. Its main tributaries are the West Lunga River which flows from the north, and the Dongwe River from the east.

== See also ==
- List of rivers of Africa
