= Peter Matoka =

Zambian politician

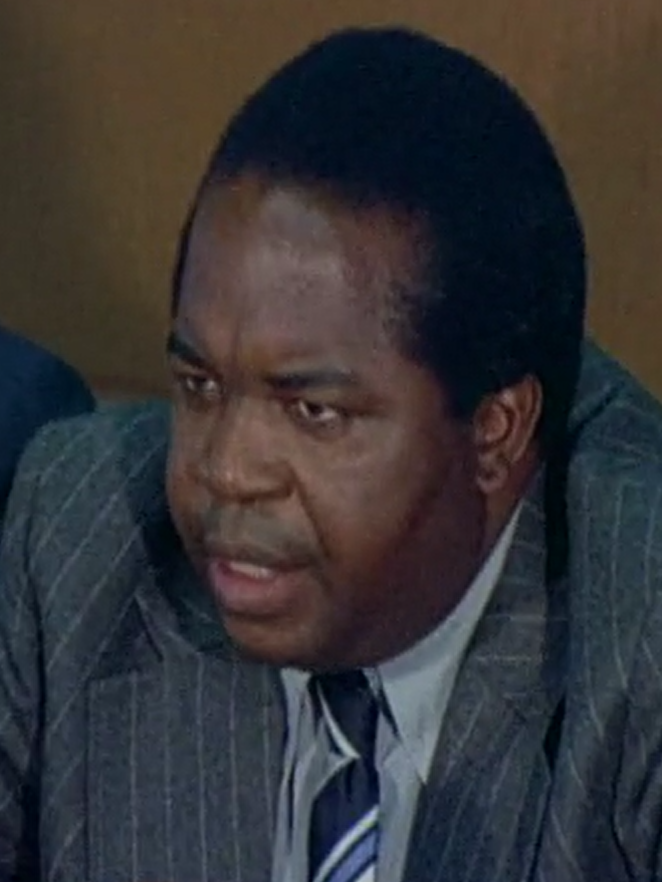
- Matoka in 1977
- Born: 1930; Mwinilunga District
- Died: September 12, 2024 (age 73 or 74)
- Burial place: Mwinilunga District
- Citizenship: Zambia
- Education: Natal University, University of Warwick
- Occupations: Lecturer, Politician
- Known for: First Minister of Information and Postal services
- Title: Dr
- Political party: UNIP

Peter Matoka (1930 – September 12, 2024) was a Zambian politician, freedom fighter and academician who served in the first post independence Cabinet in 1964 as Minister of Information and Postal services.

== Family Life ==
Matoka was married to Grace Matoka for 57 years. They had children and grandchildren. His first son is called Anthony Matoka.

== Education ==
Matoka earned his undergraduate degree from Natal University in 1954. He pursued a Ph.D. in sociology at the University of Warwick in the United Kingdom.

== Career ==
Matoka served as a minister of Information and Postal services in the UNIP government and also as a Member of the Central Committee before pursuing a diplomatic career in UK. He was a lecturer at the University of Zambia before becoming a Chancellor at Copperstone University, a position he held till his death.

== Death ==
Matoka died on Friday morning around 4:30 am on September 12, 2024, at the University Teaching Hospital, where he was admitted. His funeral was held at his residence Plot 29B Mosi road in Lusaka's Ibex Hill residential area. Finally, he was laid to rest at his home village, Kawiko, in Mwinilunga District of the North Western province.

== See also ==
- Kenneth Kaunda
- United National Independence Party
- Michael Sata
