= Mushindamo District =

- District
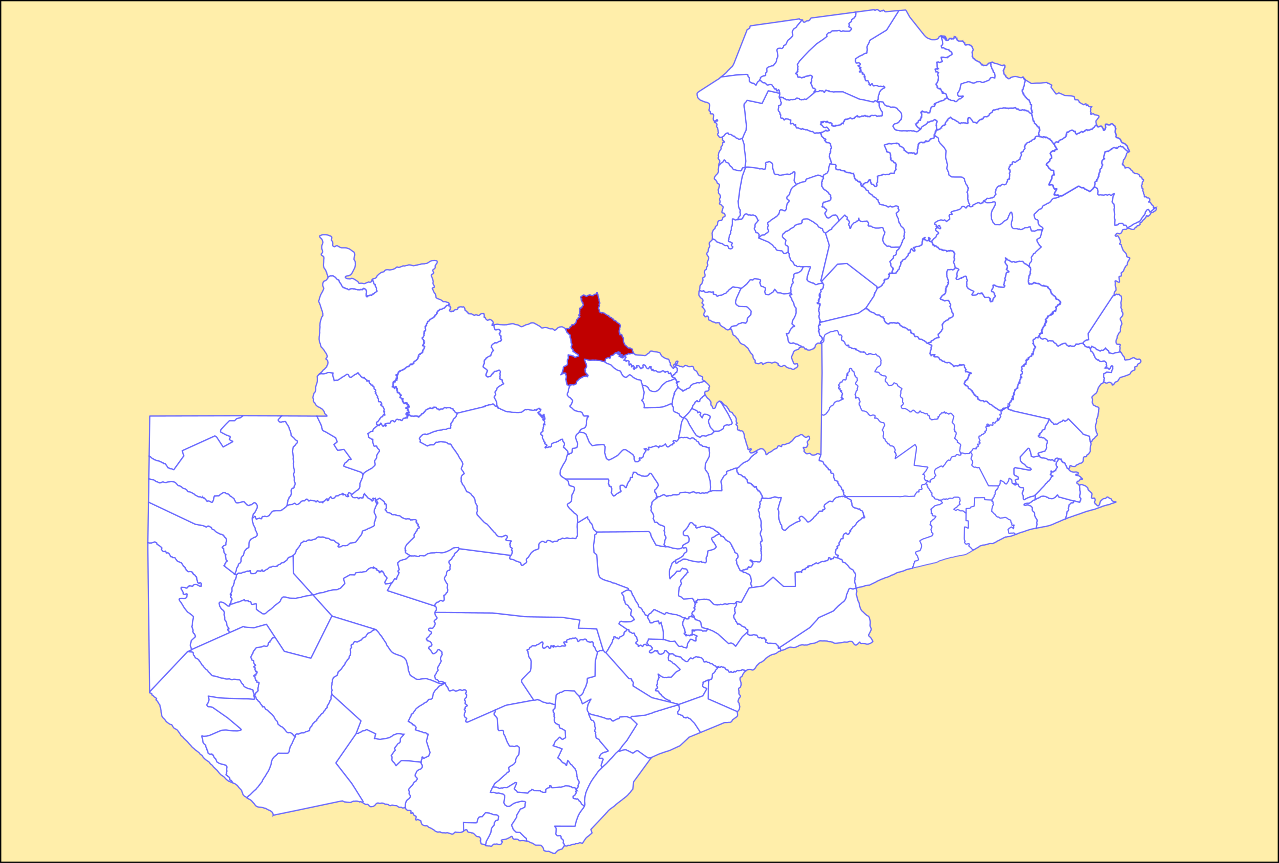
- District location in Zambia
- Country: Zambia
- Province: North-Western Province

Area
  - Total: 10,407.2 km^{2} (4,018.2 sq mi)

Population (2022)
  - Total: 65,335
  - Density: 6.2779/km^{2} (16.260/sq mi)
- Time zone: UTC+2 (CAT)

Mushindamo District is a district of North-Western Province, Zambia. It was created from part of Solwezi District in 2015.

As of the 2022 Zambian Census, the district had a population of 65,335 people.
