= Zambezi, Zambia =

Zambezi
- Town
- Location in Zambia
- Coordinates: 13°33′00″S 23°07′00″E
- Country: Zambia
- Province: North-Western Province
- District: Zambezi District
- Time zone: UTC+2 (CAT)

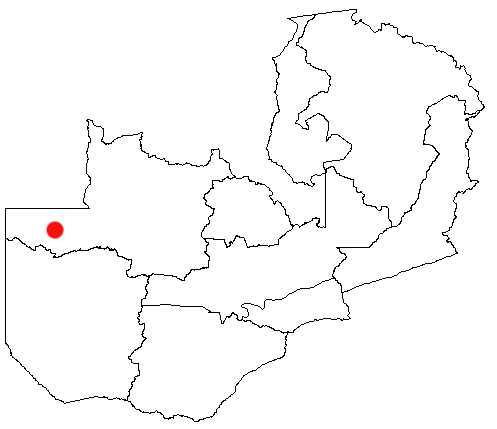
Location of Zambezi in Zambia

Zambezi is a town in the North-Western Province of Zambia, lying on the Zambezi River, west of Kabompo. It is at the western end of the M8 road. It is known for the palaces of the chiefs of the Lunda and Lovale people. Until about 1966 it was called Balovale after the dominant chief (and his village within the town is still known by that name) but the name was changed in an attempt to defuse tensions between the main groups and the government of the newly independent country.

The Chinyingi Suspension Bridge spans the river just to the north-west of the town.

== Climate ==
Zambezi features a humid subtropical climate (Köppen: Cwa) with distinct wet and dry seasons. The hottest period of the year is from September to November. Winters are cooler, with warm days and cold nights. The wet season, from October to March, experiences significant rainfall. The dry season, from April to October, is marked by minimal precipitation.

Climate data for Zambezi (1991–2020 normals, extremes 1961–2020)
Month	Jan	Feb	Mar	Apr	May	Jun	Jul	Aug	Sep	Oct	Nov	Dec	Year
Record high °C (°F)	35.6 (96.1)	35.3 (95.5)	34.6 (94.3)	34.7 (94.5)	34.5 (94.1)	32.4 (90.3)	33.0 (91.4)	39.2 (102.6)	40.1 (104.2)	41.0 (105.8)	37.6 (99.7)	36.5 (97.7)	41.0 (105.8)
Mean daily maximum °C (°F)	29.4 (84.9)	29.5 (85.1)	29.9 (85.8)	30.3 (86.5)	29.4 (84.9)	27.6 (81.7)	27.5 (81.5)	31.0 (87.8)	34.2 (93.6)	34.4 (93.9)	31.3 (88.3)	29.6 (85.3)	30.3 (86.5)
Daily mean °C (°F)	23.8 (74.8)	23.7 (74.7)	23.7 (74.7)	22.6 (72.7)	19.7 (67.5)	17.3 (63.1)	17.0 (62.6)	20.3 (68.5)	24.2 (75.6)	25.8 (78.4)	24.6 (76.3)	23.9 (75.0)	22.2 (72.0)
Mean daily minimum °C (°F)	18.1 (64.6)	17.9 (64.2)	17.5 (63.5)	14.8 (58.6)	10.0 (50.0)	6.9 (44.4)	6.4 (43.5)	9.5 (49.1)	14.1 (57.4)	17.1 (62.8)	17.9 (64.2)	18.2 (64.8)	14.0 (57.2)
Record low °C (°F)	9.2 (48.6)	12.3 (54.1)	11.0 (51.8)	6.5 (43.7)	2.4 (36.3)	−2.2 (28.0)	−2.0 (28.4)	1.4 (34.5)	6.0 (42.8)	8.6 (47.5)	10.2 (50.4)	9.2 (48.6)	−2.2 (28.0)
Average precipitation mm (inches)	235.9 (9.29)	191.7 (7.55)	159.0 (6.26)	38.8 (1.53)	2.4 (0.09)	0.8 (0.03)	0.0 (0.0)	0.4 (0.02)	4.8 (0.19)	75.1 (2.96)	140.9 (5.55)	218.1 (8.59)	1,067.9 (42.04)
Average relative humidity (%)	78.1	78.9	77.4	68.9	62.2	58.1	51.9	45.7	40.5	56.6	65.1	75.5	63.2
Mean monthly sunshine hours	170.5	156.8	195.3	255.0	297.6	291.0	306.9	303.8	273.0	248.0	189.0	167.4	2,854.3
Source: NOAA (humidity and sun 1961–1990)
