= Mwinilunga =

Zambian town

- Town
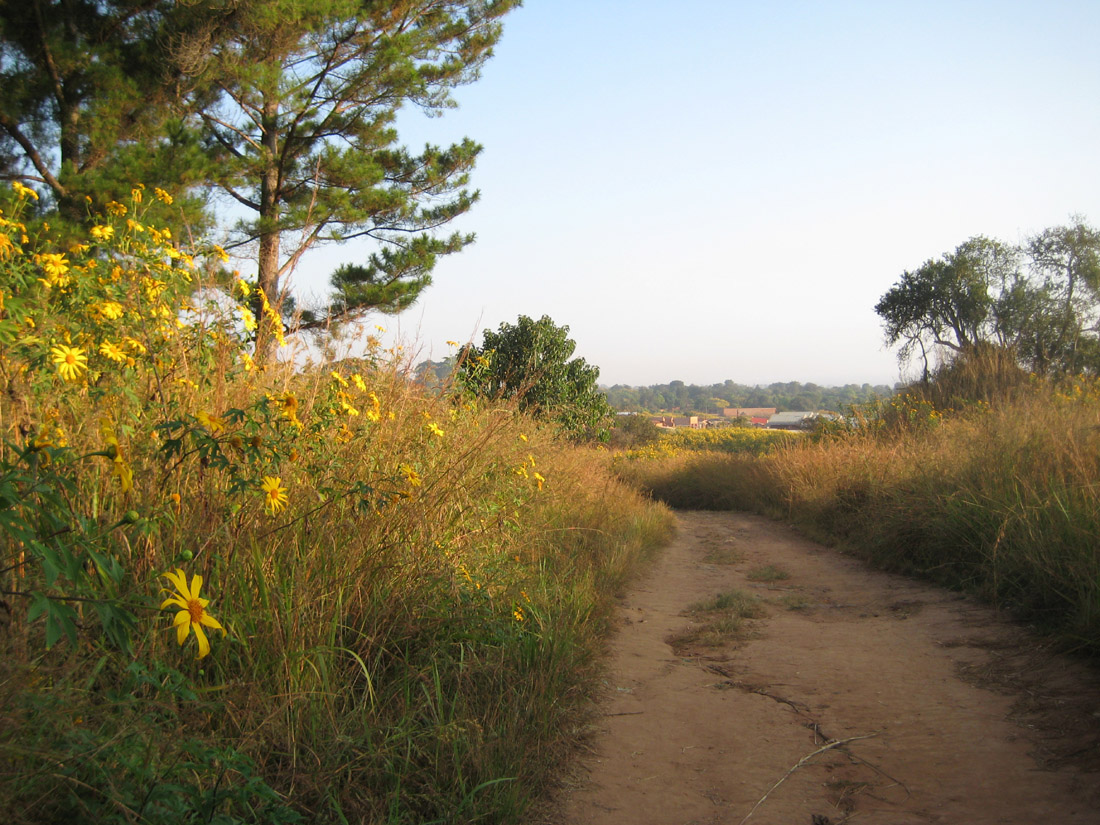
- Pathway Between the Old and New Market

- Location in Zambia
- Coordinates: 11°43′02″S 24°25′44″E
- Country: Zambia
- Province: North-Western Province
- District: Mwinilunga District
- Elevation: 1,391 m (4,564 ft)

Population (2010 Census)
  - Total: 15,704
- Time zone: UTC+2 (CAT)

Mwinilunga is a town in the North-Western Province of Zambia. It is the headquarters of Mwinilunga District, one of the province's eleven districts.

== Geography ==
=== Location ===
The town lies on the west bank of the West Lunga River, along the Chingola–Solwezi–Mwinilunga Road (T5 Road of Zambia), which continues north-westwards to Caianda, in Angola. Mwinilunga is located approximately 275 kilometres (171 mi), by road, west of Solwezi, the provincial capital. Another tarmacked state road (D286 Road of Zambia), leads south to Kabompo, the capital of Kabompo District. Kabompo town is approximately 247 kilometres (153 mi) south of Mwinilunga.

Mwinilunga sits in the extreme north-western corner of the country, close to the international borders with Angola and the Democratic Republic of the Congo. The geographical coordinates of Mwinilunga, Zambia are:11°43'02.0"S, 24°25'44.0"E (Latitude:-11.717222; Longitude:24.428889). The average elevation of the town is 1,391 metres (4,564 ft) above mean sea level.

=== Climate ===
This is one of the wettest places in Zambia with annual rainfall of about 1,400 millimetres (55 in) falling in the rainy season from October to May.

Climate data for Mwinilunga (1991–2020, extremes 1961–2020)
Month	Jan	Feb	Mar	Apr	May	Jun	Jul	Aug	Sep	Oct	Nov	Dec	Year
Record high °C (°F)	36.0 (96.8)	37.5 (99.5)	31.8 (89.2)	33.0 (91.4)	32.0 (89.6)	31.0 (87.8)	31.4 (88.5)	37.5 (99.5)	37.5 (99.5)	37.0 (98.6)	37.0 (98.6)	32.5 (90.5)	37.5 (99.5)
Mean daily maximum °C (°F)	27.1 (80.8)	27.2 (81.0)	27.6 (81.7)	28.0 (82.4)	27.9 (82.2)	26.5 (79.7)	26.5 (79.7)	29.2 (84.6)	31.6 (88.9)	31.0 (87.8)	28.5 (83.3)	27.1 (80.8)	28.5 (83.3)
Daily mean °C (°F)	21.9 (71.4)	21.9 (71.4)	22.0 (71.6)	21.3 (70.3)	19.1 (66.4)	17.0 (62.6)	17.1 (62.8)	19.4 (66.9)	22.4 (72.3)	23.1 (73.6)	22.5 (72.5)	22.0 (71.6)	20.8 (69.4)
Mean daily minimum °C (°F)	16.7 (62.1)	16.6 (61.9)	16.3 (61.3)	14.5 (58.1)	10.2 (50.4)	7.4 (45.3)	7.7 (45.9)	9.5 (49.1)	13.1 (55.6)	15.2 (59.4)	16.5 (61.7)	16.8 (62.2)	13.4 (56.1)
Record low °C (°F)	11.5 (52.7)	11.0 (51.8)	10.0 (50.0)	7.8 (46.0)	1.6 (34.9)	−1.9 (28.6)	0.5 (32.9)	0.9 (33.6)	1.6 (34.9)	7.5 (45.5)	10.0 (50.0)	7.3 (45.1)	−1.9 (28.6)
Average precipitation mm (inches)	216.7 (8.53)	219.8 (8.65)	223.6 (8.80)	79.4 (3.13)	7.9 (0.31)	0.0 (0.0)	0.0 (0.0)	2.1 (0.08)	13.8 (0.54)	66.1 (2.60)	198.8 (7.83)	288.1 (11.34)	1,316.3 (51.82)
Average relative humidity (%)	82.5	84.6	84.1	77.6	70.2	64.5	58.7	50.8	49.1	67.8	78.3	83.7	71.0
Mean monthly sunshine hours	136.4	120.4	151.9	228.0	294.5	297.0	310.0	297.6	261.0	213.9	156.0	133.3	2,600
Source: NOAA (humidity and sun 1961–1990)

== Overview ==
Due to its proximity with Angola and DR Congo, Mwinilunga would have benefited from trade with the two neighboring countries. Poor roads, human conflict and lack of collective political will in the three countries, have so far prevented any meaningful trade policy from developing. The Zambezi River originates in Ikelenge District, in a community called Kalene Hill, approximately 80 kilometres (50 mi) north of Mwinilunga town.

== Population ==
The town had a population estimated at 14,500 in 2006. The Chilunda-speaking Kanongesha-Lunda people are the largest ethnic group, and are related to the Chibemba-speaking Kazembe-Lunda of Luapula Province. In 1990, the census carried out that year, put the town's population at 6,342 people. In 2000, the population was 10,745 inhabitants. During the 2010 national census, the population of Mwinilunga was enumerated at 15,704 people. The table below illustrates the same data in tabular format.

Year	Population
1990	6,342
2000	10,745
2006	14,500 (Estimate)
2010	15,704

== Education ==
Mwinilunga Secondary School is the largest school to date in town. Government and community schools are scattered in the neighborhoods surrounding the metropolitan area, and provide education for children from nursery through high school. Mwinilunga is also home to The Sakeji School, a primary boarding school.

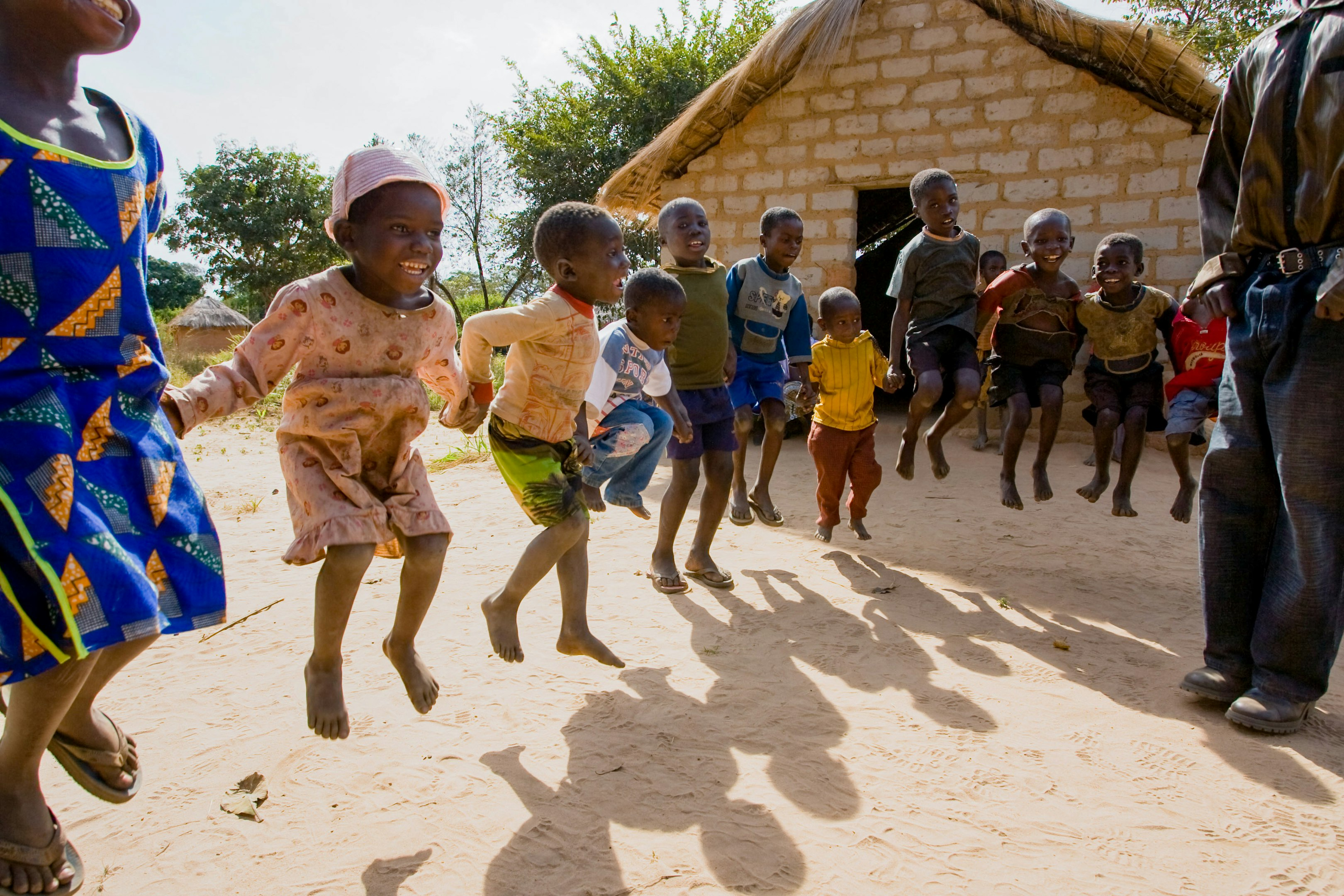
A children's class in Mwinilunga, Zambia

In 2025, the first high school in the village of Katuyola—a village in the Mwinilunga district—was opened.

== Economy ==
Forest Fruits Limited has been operating in Mwinilunga since 1998, successfully working with over 7,000 beekeepers in the region to export organic honey to the European market. The company also employs about 100 staff.

=== Kasenseli Gold Mine ===
See: Mining in Zambia Kasenseli Gold Mine

In early August 2019 gold deposits were discovered and confirmed by experts from the Ministry of Mines and Mineral Development. The Government, through its subsidiary, ZCCM Investments Holdings (ZCCM-IH), intends to set up a gold mine in Chief Chibwika's area where the gold deposits have been discovered.

=== Kalene Hills Fruit Factory ===
Commissioned: July 2022

Construction Cost: ZMW 130.0 million (US$ 7.8 million)

Ownership: Kalene Hills Fruit Company, a 100% Zambian-owned business set up with support from the Industrial Development Corporation.

Operations: Processing fruits as well as other products such as beans, groundnuts and tomatoes supplied by over 1,500 small-scale farmers.

Direct Jobs: 150

In-Direct Jobs: 780

== Transport ==
In 2006 plans were formulated to extend the proposed railway to Solwezi to the town and even on to the Benguela Railway in Angola to avoid reliance on the line in the DR Congo, but these plans have not been confirmed and the Benguela Railway has not yet been re-opened. However, the Angolan transport ministry plans to build a line branching off the Benguela Railway at Luacano and entering Zambia from Macango, Angola. The town is also home to Mwinilunga Airport.

== Tourism ==
Mwinilunga lies southeast of the Nchila Wildlife Reserve rainforest, known for its sable antelope and other large mammals, Luakela Forest Reserve and the Chitunta Plain, known for its birdlife and as the source of the Zambezi River. The annual Chisemwa cha Lunda ceremony held by Senior Chief Kanongesha of the Lunda draws crowds to the district every September. Nyaunda Ceremony celebrated by Lundas of Senior Sailunga East of Mwinilunga.
