= Kabompo =

- Town
- Location in Zambia
- Coordinates: 13°35′36″S 24°12′10″E
- Country: Zambia
- Province: North-Western Province
- District: Kabompo District
- Time zone: UTC+2 (CAT)
- Area code: 10101
- Climate: Cwa

Kabompo is a town in north-western Zambia, lying on the Kabompo River with a population over 88,000 people. It is surrounded by teak forest and is home to a Roman Catholic mission. Kabompo was founded in the 1900s or even earlier than that, the district centre was first situated in Nkulwashi before it was moved to its current location. The district boasts of its significance towards its contribution to the nation's food security through Food Reserve Agency (FRA). Even in the late 60's and early 70's Kabompo was very active in agricultural activities through NAMBOARD.

Though currently the district's most significant activity is the production of honey, by the early 90's the district had active companies such as IRDP, GulF, Bee keeping and MUZAMA located in now Manyinga district. The district boasted of skills training through, Bee keeping which trained youths in harvesting of honey and production of wax from honey etc. On the other side Farmers Training College was all actively imparting young farmers with knowledge on how to produce and matain and manage agricultural products where as MUZAMA produced a lot of campeters and crafts men and women. Within the district you also find a water falls called Chikata, and water rapids at Kavinde village and Chiweza dam which is situated mubang'a area.

Kabompo House, No. J11a, Kabompo Township, to which Kenneth Kaunda (first president of post independence Zambia) was restricted by the Colonial authorities from March to July 1959 is a noted national monument.

Kabompo has six main local languages these being Lunda, Luvale, Nkoya, Luchazi, Chokwe and Mbunda. The main tradition ceremonies that take place include Lukwakwa, Mbuda Liyoyelo and Chiweka.

The district has a few recreation facilities and it has Guesthouses and Lodges that offer accommodation with other related facilities. Some of the lodges with high standards services include Chidikumbidi Lodge and Golden Jubilee Lodge. It has Finance bank (z) Ltd as the only Bank and it has a district hospital that caters for the local people as well as a police station. It has one fuel filling station that caters for the entire district and it runs out of fuel sometimes due to high demand. The major source of power is the Thermal power provided by Zesco Ltd, however, it is being connected to reliable power through the national grid. The district has no established bakeries and people rely on the small scale bakeries.

== Transport ==
The district is accessible by a tarred road (the M8 road) that stretches from Solwezi to Chavuma and it is about 365 km from Solwezi. There is an interesting cable ferry across the Kabompo River 80 km to the south-east. There is an air strip.

== Education ==
Kabompo district has eight major secondary schools these being Kabompo Secondary school, Chiweza Secondary School, Pokola day Secondary school, Kabulamema Secondary School, Kamashila Secondary School, Kanaji Chilanda Secondary School, Chikenge Secondary School and Kayombo Secondary school.
