= Kabompo District =

Coordinates: 13°15′S 24°10′E

- District
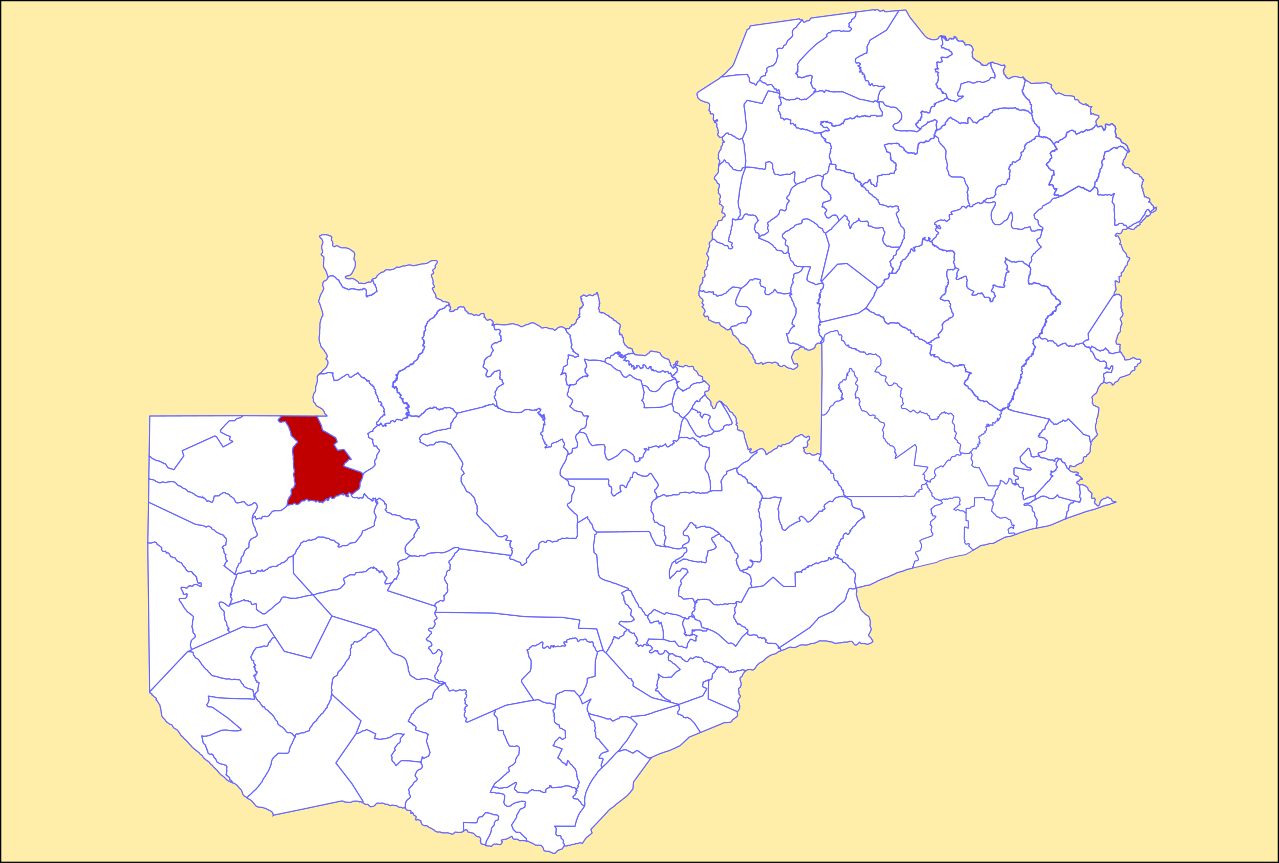
- District location in Zambia
- Country: Zambia
- Province: North-Western Province
- Capital: Kabompo

Area
  - Total: 7,199.7 km^{2} (2,779.8 sq mi)

Population (2022)
  - Total: 65,760
  - Density: 9.134/km^{2} (23.66/sq mi)
- Time zone: UTC+2 (CAT)

Kabompo District is a district of Zambia, located in North-Western Province. The capital lies at Kabompo. As of the 2022 Zambian Census, the district had a population of 65,760 people.
