= Mwinilunga District =

Coordinates: 12°00′S 24°35′E

- District
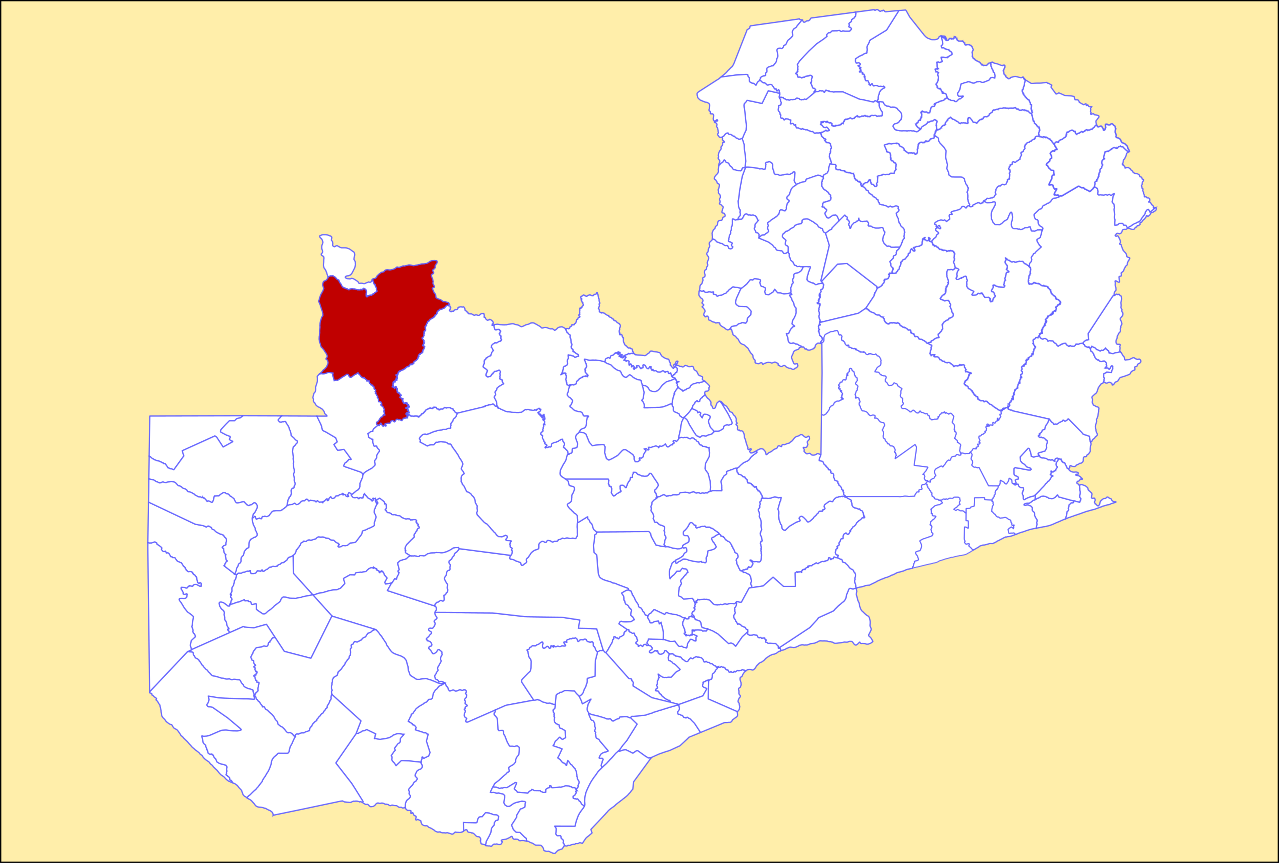
- District location in Zambia
- Country: Zambia
- Province: North-Western Province
- Capital: Mwinilunga

Area
  - Total: 18,830.2 km^{2} (7,270.4 sq mi)

Population (2022)
  - Total: 136,770
  - Density: 7.2633/km^{2} (18.812/sq mi)
- Time zone: UTC+2 (CAT)

Mwinilunga District is a district of Zambia, located in North-Western Province. The capital lies at Mwinilunga. As of the 2022 Zambian Census, the district had a population of 136,770 people.
