= Solwezi =

Zambian town

- Town
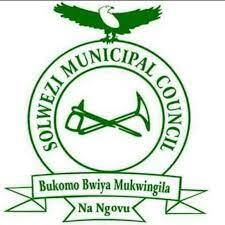
- Seal

- Location in Zambia
- Coordinates: 12°08′36″S 26°23′09″E
- Country: Zambia
- Province: North-Western Province
- District: Solwezi District
- Elevation: 1,397 m (4,583 ft)

Population (2010 Census)
  - Total: 90,856
- Time zone: UTC+2 (CAT)
- Climate: Cwb

Solwezi is a town in Zambia. It is the provincial capital of the mineral-rich North-Western Province. Solwezi is also the administrative capital of Solwezi District, one of the eleven districts in the North-Western Province.

== Geography ==
=== Location ===
Solwezi is located on the Chingola–Solwezi–Mwinilunga Road (T5 Road of Zambia), approximately 177 kilometres (110 mi) north-west of Chingola and approximately 275 kilometres (171 mi) south-east of Mwinilunga, in the extreme northwest of the country. The geographical coordinates of the city are:12°08'36.0"S, 26°23'09.0"E (Latitude:-12.143333; Longitude:26.385833). Solwezi sits at an average elevation of 1,397 metres (4,583 ft) above mean sea level.

Approximately 6 kilometres (4 mi) south of the central business district, is the "Kifubwa Rock Stream Shelter", also Kifubwa Rock National Monument. It is located next to the Kifubwa River, with inscriptions dating from the Paleolithic period, carbon dated to about 6300 BC. The conservation area measures approximately 2,590 square kilometres (1,000 sq mi) with the Kifubwa Stream Cave at its centre.

=== Climate ===
Solwezi features a humid subtropical climate (Köppen: Cwa) with distinct wet and dry seasons. October and November are the hottest months. Winters are milder, with July being the coolest month. The wet season, from November to March, experiences abundant rainfall. The dry season, from May to September, is marked by minimal precipitation.

Climate data for Solwezi (1991–2020)
Month	Jan	Feb	Mar	Apr	May	Jun	Jul	Aug	Sep	Oct	Nov	Dec	Year
Record high °C (°F)	39.2 (102.6)	32.8 (91.0)	32.7 (90.9)	32.4 (90.3)	32.1 (89.8)	30.3 (86.5)	33.1 (91.6)	34.2 (93.6)	38.2 (100.8)	39.2 (102.6)	35.1 (95.2)	33.3 (91.9)	34.4 (93.9)
Mean daily maximum °C (°F)	27.3 (81.1)	27.4 (81.3)	27.8 (82.0)	27.6 (81.7)	27.2 (81.0)	25.9 (78.6)	25.7 (78.3)	28.5 (83.3)	31.3 (88.3)	31.9 (89.4)	28.9 (84.0)	27.2 (81.0)	28.1 (82.5)
Daily mean °C (°F)	22.1 (71.8)	22.1 (71.8)	22.1 (71.8)	21.0 (69.8)	18.7 (65.7)	16.8 (62.2)	16.6 (61.9)	19.4 (66.9)	22.4 (72.3)	23.9 (75.0)	22.8 (73.0)	22.1 (71.8)	20.8 (69.4)
Mean daily minimum °C (°F)	16.9 (62.4)	16.8 (62.2)	16.4 (61.5)	14.3 (57.7)	10.1 (50.2)	7.6 (45.7)	7.4 (45.3)	10.3 (50.5)	13.4 (56.1)	15.8 (60.4)	16.7 (62.1)	16.9 (62.4)	13.6 (56.5)
Record low °C (°F)	11.9 (53.4)	10.4 (50.7)	8.8 (47.8)	6.9 (44.4)	1.2 (34.2)	1.9 (35.4)	1.1 (34.0)	2.1 (35.8)	3.5 (38.3)	9.0 (48.2)	9.8 (49.6)	11.9 (53.4)	6.5 (43.7)
Average precipitation mm (inches)	273.5 (10.77)	228.3 (8.99)	210.8 (8.30)	48.9 (1.93)	2.6 (0.10)	0.3 (0.01)	0.0 (0.0)	0.6 (0.02)	2.7 (0.11)	33.7 (1.33)	160.2 (6.31)	279.9 (11.02)	1,241.4 (48.87)
Source: NOAA

== Population ==
In 1990, the population of Solwezi was 23,435 people. In 2000, there were 38,121 people. The 2010 population census and household survey enumerated the population of the town at 90,856 inhabitants.

Historical population
Year	Pop.	±%
1990	23,435	—
2000	38,121	+62.7%
2010	90,856	+138.3%

== Economy ==
Solwezi is a mining town. As of 2015, the town was still developing, with infrastructure development running behind the swelling population. At that time, only the main street, Independence Road was named. Many of the other streets were un-named and unpaved. Copper is the main mineral extracted although cobalt, gold and uranium is also mined in the area.

The adjacent Kalumbila District hosts Lumwana Mine, located about 65 km or 40 mi west of Solwezi; and Kalumbila Mine, located about 140 km or 87 mi west of Solwezi, and run by Barrick Gold. Kalumbila is operated by First Quantum Minerals. The deposits at Lumwana were discovered in 1961, but no serious work was carried out there until Equinox Minerals Limited became involved in 1999. Uranium is also mined in Kalumbila District at the Lumwana mine. The main industry of Solwezi District is copper mining at Kansanshi Mine (located about 10 km or 6 mi north) run by First Quantum Minerals. Kansanshi Mine exploits copper-gold ore. The mining site has intermittently been running since the early 20th century for copper and gold.

== Tribes ==
Kaonde is the largest tribe represented in Solwezi, in addition to large numbers of Lunda and Luvale speaking people. The Kaonde is a tribe that, like the Lunda people, are descendants of the Luba-Lunda Empire of Congo. They were among the first Zambians to do mining of copper in Zambia as suggested by archaeological evidence at the Kansanshi Mine in Solwezi that dates back to the Iron Age. The Kaonde tribe falls under one of the main tribes of Zambia, among the Lozi, the Bemba, the Ngoni, the Tonga and the Luvale. The Kaonde tribe has about 300,000 people in Zambia and about 30,000 people in Southern DRC.

== Transportation ==
Solwezi is situated on the T5 Motorway, which connects the Copperbelt Province with Angola. Most people walk or drive around the town to get to and from different places. The Solwezi Airport is an airport near the T5 motorway.

== See also ==
- Roman Catholic Diocese of Solwezi
