= Kalumbila District =

- District
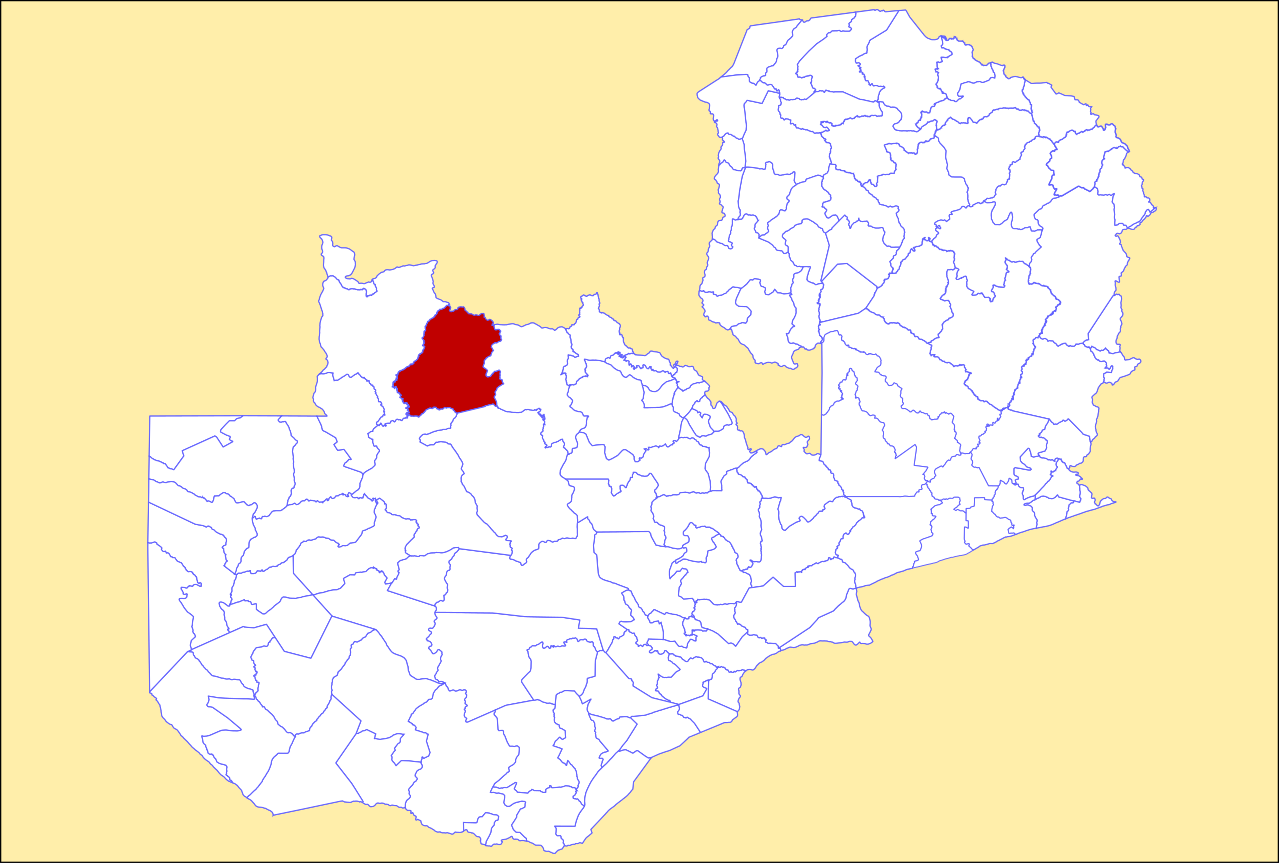
- District location in Zambia
- Country: Zambia
- Province: North-Western Province

Area
  - Total: 16,456.2 km^{2} (6,353.8 sq mi)

Population (2022)
  - Total: 177,067
  - Density: 10.7599/km^{2} (27.8680/sq mi)
- Time zone: UTC+2 (CAT)

Kalumbila District is a district of North-Western Province, Zambia. It was named after a mine of the same name (Kalumbila Mine) and was made independent from Solwezi District In 2015. As of the 2022 Zambian Census, the district had a population of 177,067 people.

== Mining ==
Kalumbila Mine is a copper mine operated by FQM Trident Limited (previously known as Kalumbila Minerals), a wholly owned subsidiary of First Quantum Minerals of Canada.

The Enterprise Nickel Project is an open-pit nickel mine, also owned by First Quantum Minerals, and is 12 km from the Kalumbila Mine. The Kalumbila Mine processing facility will be used to produce nickel concentrate output. The project, estimated at U$275 million, was expected to be operational at the end of 2021 but as of March 2022 was still yet to be operational. In May 2022, First Quantum Minerals approved an additional US$100 million investment the project, which is now expected to commence production in 2023.
