= North-Western Province, Zambia =

Province of Zambia

Coordinates: 13°00′S 25°00′E

North-Western
- Province
- Map of Zambia showing the North-Western Province

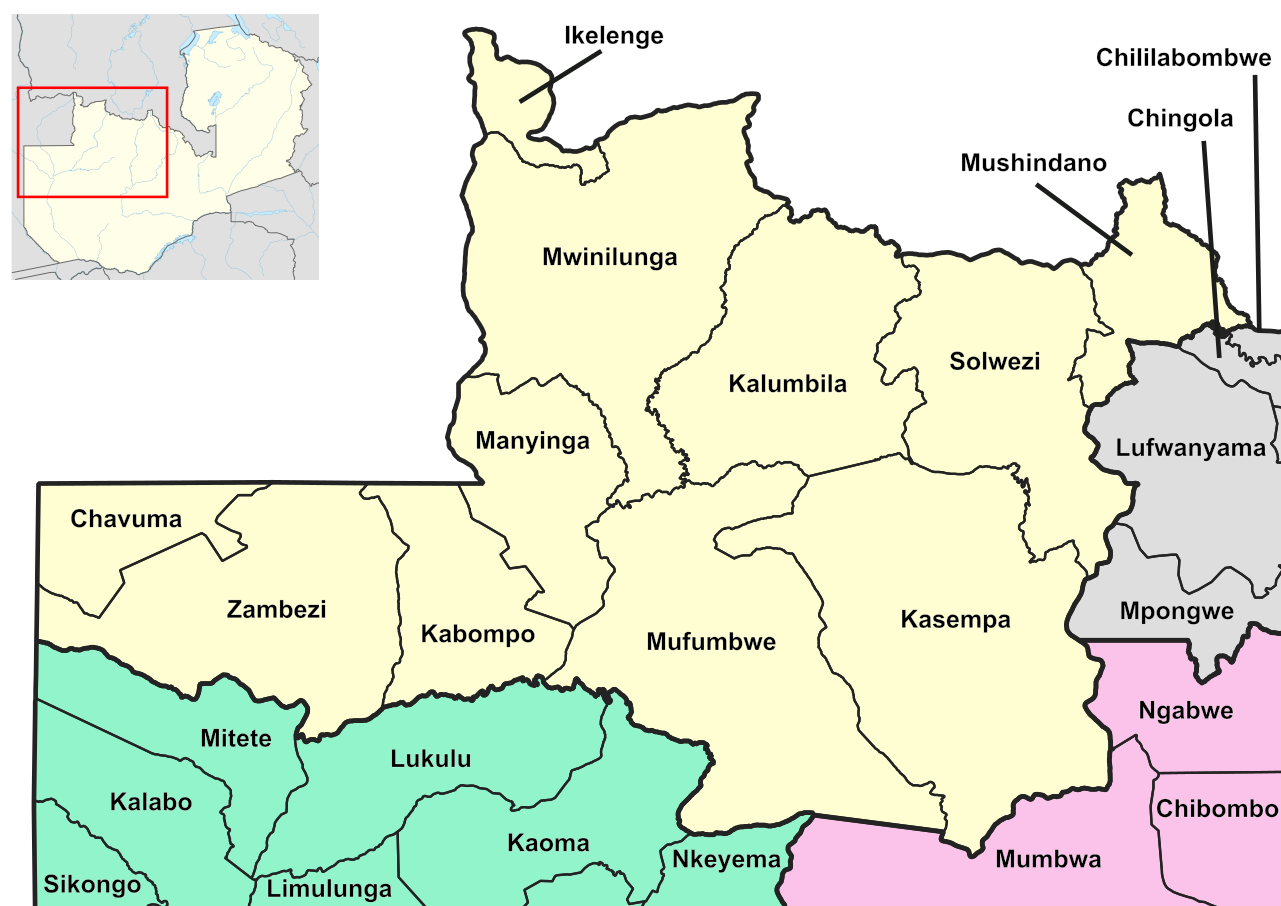
- Map of Zambia showing North-Western Province with its districts
- Country: Zambia
- Capital: Solwezi

Government
  - Type: Provincial Administration
  - Provincial Minister: Robert Lihefu

Area
  - Total: 125,826 km^{2} (48,582 sq mi)

Population (2022)
  - Total: 1,278,357
  - Density: 10.1597/km^{2} (26.3136/sq mi)
- Time zone: UTC+2 (CAT)
- HDI (2018): 0.610 medium · 3rd

North-Western Province is one of ten Provinces of Zambia. It covers an area of 125,826 km^{2} (48,582 sq mi), has a population of 1,278,357 and a population density of 20 per square kilometre as of 2022. It is the most sparsely populated province in the country. The provincial capital is Solwezi. The literacy rate stood at 63 per cent in 2010 against a national average of 70.2 per cent. The rural population constituted 77.45%, while the urban population was 22.55%. North-Western Province is bordered by Angola in the west, the Democratic Republic of Congo (DR Congo) in the north, Copperbelt Province in the east, Central in the south-east, and Western Province in the south-west.

Agriculture was the major profession and sorghum was the major crop in the province with 1,038 metric tonnes, constituting 8.98% of the national output. The unemployment rate was 14 per cent and the general unemployment rate for youth stood at 31 per cent as of 2008. Zambezi Airport, Solwezi Airport and Kalumbila Airport are the only three airports in the province and there are other small airstrips across the province, such as Mukinge Airstrip in Kasempa, Kabanda Airstrip in Mufumbwe, Chitokoloki Airstrip in Zambezi, Kawiku Airstrip in Mwinilunga, Kalene Airstrip in Ikelenge, Luamfula Airstrip in Mushidamo and Kyanika Airstrip in Kalumbila.

The Likumbi lya Mize festival is a UNESCO world heritage ceremony celebrated in Zambezi District by the Luvale tribe, popularly known as vakaChinyama during August. The Chivweka ceremony is celebrated by the Luchazi people of the Kabompo District and it is held every July at Senior Chief Kalunga's palace in Chikenge, the capital of the Luchazi people. Chivweka means making fire. The Kufukwila festival celebrated in Solwezi District by Kaonde tribe during May, the Insakwa yaba Kaonde festival celebrated in Solwezi District by Kaonde tribe during May, the Nsomo festival celebrated in Kasempa District by Kaonde tribe during June and the Ukupupa festival celebrated by lamba tribe in Mushindamo during June are the major festivals of the province.

== Geography ==
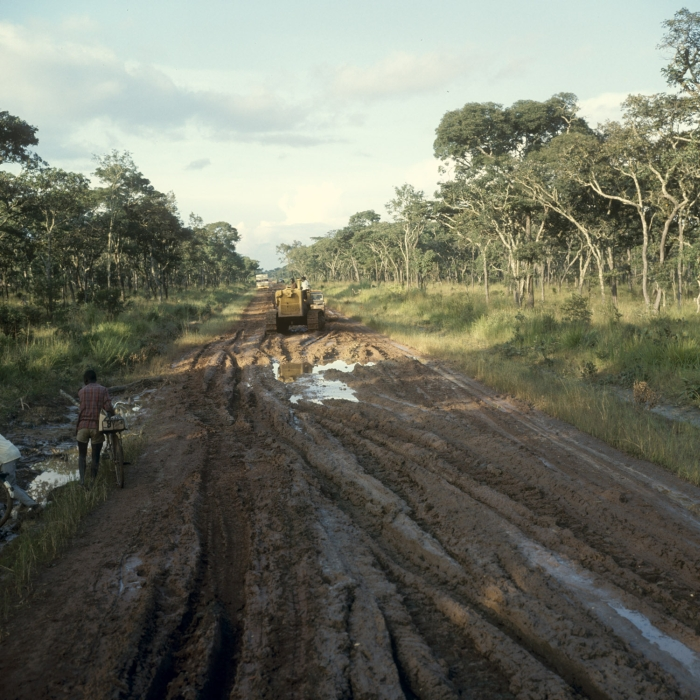
Transport lane to Solwezi, the capital city of the province

North-Western Province is bordered by Angola to the west, DR Congo to the north, Copperbelt Province to the east, Central to the south-east and Western Province to the south-west. The general topography of the province is characterized by uplifted planation surfaces. The general elevation of the nation as a whole is tended towards West to East from the Kalahari Basin. The level of land falls from the upper Congo towards the Zambezi depression in the South forming a plateau.

The province lies in the watershed between the DR Congo and Zambezi river systems. The province, along with some of the other provinces in the country, lies in the frontier formed between the continental divide separating the Atlantic Ocean and the Indian Ocean, which traverses from DR Congo to the south of Tanzania. There are three major seasons: a cool dry season from April to August, a hot dry season from August to November and a warm wet season from November to April. The maximum heat is experienced during October, while the maximum rainfall is received during December. The annual rainfall is more than 1,200 mm (47 in) in the region. The region has usually savannah vegetation and small areas of dry evergreen forests.

Climate data for North-Western (Zambia)
Month	Jan	Feb	Mar	Apr	May	Jun	Jul	Aug	Sep	Oct	Nov	Dec	Year
Record high °C (°F)	26.3 (79.3)	26.7 (80.1)	26.8 (80.2)	26.9 (80.4)	26.1 (79.0)	25 (77)	25.2 (77.4)	27.6 (81.7)	30.4 (86.7)	30.6 (87.1)	28 (82)	26.4 (79.5)	30.6 (87.1)
Mean daily maximum °C (°F)	20 (68)	20.4 (68.7)	20.3 (68.5)	19.8 (67.6)	17.8 (64.0)	15.7 (60.3)	15.9 (60.6)	18.5 (65.3)	21.5 (70.7)	22.3 (72.1)	21.1 (70.0)	20.2 (68.4)	22.3 (72.1)
Mean daily minimum °C (°F)	16.1 (61.0)	16 (61)	15.6 (60.1)	13.5 (56.3)	9.2 (48.6)	5.9 (42.6)	5.5 (41.9)	8.2 (46.8)	11.2 (52.2)	14.3 (57.7)	15.7 (60.3)	16 (61)	5.5 (41.9)
Average precipitation mm (inches)	286 (11.3)	234 (9.2)	183 (7.2)	42 (1.7)	3 (0.1)	0 (0)	0 (0)	0 (0)	2 (0.1)	29 (1.1)	161 (6.3)	278 (10.9)	1,218 (48.0)
Source 1:
Source 2:

== Demographics ==
Historical population
Year	Pop.	±%
1964	211,000	—
1969	232,000	+10.0%
1990	438,216	+88.9%
2000	583,350	+33.1%
2010	727,044	+24.6%
2022	1,278,357	+75.8%
Sources: 1964-69: 1980-2000: 2010:

As per the 2010 Zambian census, North-Western Province had a population of 727,044 accounting for 5.55% of the total Zambian population of 13,092,666. There were 358,141 males and 368,903 females, making the sex ratio 1,030 for every 1,000 males, compared to the national average of 1,028. The literacy rate stood at 63.00% against a national average of 70.2%. The rural population constituted 77.45%, while the urban population was 22.55%. The total area of the province was 125,826 km^{2} and the population density was 5.80 per km^{2}. The population density during 2000 Zambian census stood at 5.80. The decadal population growth of the province was 2.20%. The median age in the province at the time of marriage was 20.5. The average household size was 5.6, with the families headed by females being 4.5 and 5.9 for families headed by men. The total eligible voters in the province was 72.20%. The unemployment rate of the province was 10.30%. The total fertility rate was 6.8, complete birth rate was 6.3, crude birth rate was 38.0, child women population at birth was 870, general fertility rate was 169, gross reproduction rate was 2.7 and net reproduction rate was 1.9. The total labour force constituted 55.50% of the total population. Out of the labour force, 60.9% were men and 50.4% women. The annual growth rate of labour force was 1.8%. Lunda was the most spoken language with 33.8% speaking it. Albinism is a condition where the victims do not have any pigment in their skin, hair or eyes. The total population in the province with the condition stood at 1,387. The life expectancy at birth stood at 56 compared to the national average of 51.

== National Parks and culture ==
Busanga Swamps and plains in Kafue National Park, West Lunga National Park and Zambezi grasslands in the far west of the state are the major national parks in the province. The Kufukwila and Insakwa yaba Kaonde festivals celebrated in Solwezi District by Kaonde tribe during May, Nsomo festival celebrated in Kasempa District by Kaonde tribe during June, Ntongo festival celebrated in Mufumbwe District by Kaonde tribe during June, Ukupupa festival celebrated in mushindamo District by Lamba tribe during July, Chivweka festival celebrated in Kabompo District by Luchazi tribe during July, Kunyata Ntanda festival celebrated in Solwezi District by Kaonde tribe during July, Likumbi Lya Mize festival celebrated in Zambezi District by Luvale tribe during August, Lunda Lubanza festival celebrated in Zambezi District by Lunda tribe during August, Lubinda Ntongo festival celebrated in Solwezi District by Kaonde tribe during August, Chisemwa Cha Lunda festival celebrated in Mwinilunga District by Lunda tribe during September, Makundu festival celebrated in Mufumbwe District by Kaonde tribe during September, Mbunda Liyoyelo festival celebrated in Kabompo District by Mbunda tribe during September, Kuvuluka Kishakulu festival celebrated in Solwezi District by Kaonde tribe during September, Lukwakwa festival celebrated in Kabompo District by Mbunda tribe during October, Chidika Cha Mvula festival celebrated in Mwinilunga District by Lunda tribe during October and Lwendela festival celebrated in Kasempa District by Kaonde tribe during October are the major festivals in the province.

== Administration ==
Profession	% of working population
Agriculture, Forestry & Fishing (by Industry)	7.30
Community, Social and Personnel	3.30
Construction	3.30
Electricity, Gas, and water	1.30
Financial & Insurance activities	0.60
Hotels and Restaurants	4.00
Manufacturing	2.60
Mining & Quarrying	3.80
Transportation and Storage	3.00
Wholesale & Retail Trade	2.40

Provincial administration is set up purely for administrative purposes. The province is headed by a minister appointed by the President and there are ministries of central government for each province. The administrative head of the province is the Permanent Secretary, appointed by the President. There are Deputy Permanent Secretary, heads of government departments and civil servants at the provincial level. North-Western Province is divided into eleven districts, namely, Chavuma District, Ikelenge District, Kabompo District, Kalumbila District, Kasempa District, Manyinga District, Mufumbwe District, Mushindamo District, Mwinilunga District, Solwezi District and Zambezi District. All the district headquarters are the same as the district names. There are eleven councils in the province, each of which is headed by an elected representative, called a councilor. Each councilor holds office for three years. The administrative staff of the council is selected based on Local Government Service Commission from within or outside the district. The office of the provincial government is located in each of the district headquarters and has provincial local government officers and auditors. Each council is responsible for raising and collecting local taxes and the budgets of the council are audited and submitted every year after the annual budget. The elected members of the council do not draw salaries, but are paid allowances from the council. North-Western is a predominantly rural province and hence there are no city or municipal councils. The government stipulates 63 different functions for the councils with the majority of them being infrastructure management and local administration. Councils are mandated to maintain each of their community centres, zoos, local parks, drainage system, playgrounds, cemeteries, caravan sites, libraries, museums and art galleries. They also work along with specific government departments for helping in agriculture, conservation of natural resources, postal service, establishing and maintaining hospitals, schools and colleges. The councils prepare schemes that encourage community participation.

== Education and economy ==
HIV infected & AIDS deaths
Year	HIV infected	AIDS deaths
1985	250	107
1990	3,104	087
1995	15,855	655
2000	25,735	1,848
2005	27,676	2,792
2010	27,815	2,859

As of 2004, the province had 536 basic schools, 23 high schools and the number of schoolchildren out of school in ages between 7 and 15 stood at 26,834. The unemployment rate was 14 per cent and the general unemployment rate for youth stood at 31 per cent as of 2008. The province had 25 doctors as of 2005. There were 439 Malaria incidences for every 1,000 people in the province as of 2005 and there were 2,859 AIDS deaths as of 2010. The total area of crops planted during the year 2014 in the province was 79,528.80 hectares which constituted 4.19% of the total area cultivated in Zambia. The net production stood at 175,592 metric tonnes, which formed 4.31% of the total agricultural production in the country. Sorghum was the major crop in the province with 1,038 metric tonnes, constituting 8.98% of the national output. Zambezi Airport and Solwezi Airport are the only two airports in the province.

== See also ==
- Bibliography of the history of Zambia
