= List of national parks of Zambia =

This is a list of national parks in Zambia with a short section on park administration. There are twenty national parks in Zambia, although some are not well maintained and so contain no facilities and few animals. Others have high concentrations of animals and are popular with tourists, while two or three are world-famous.

== Map ==
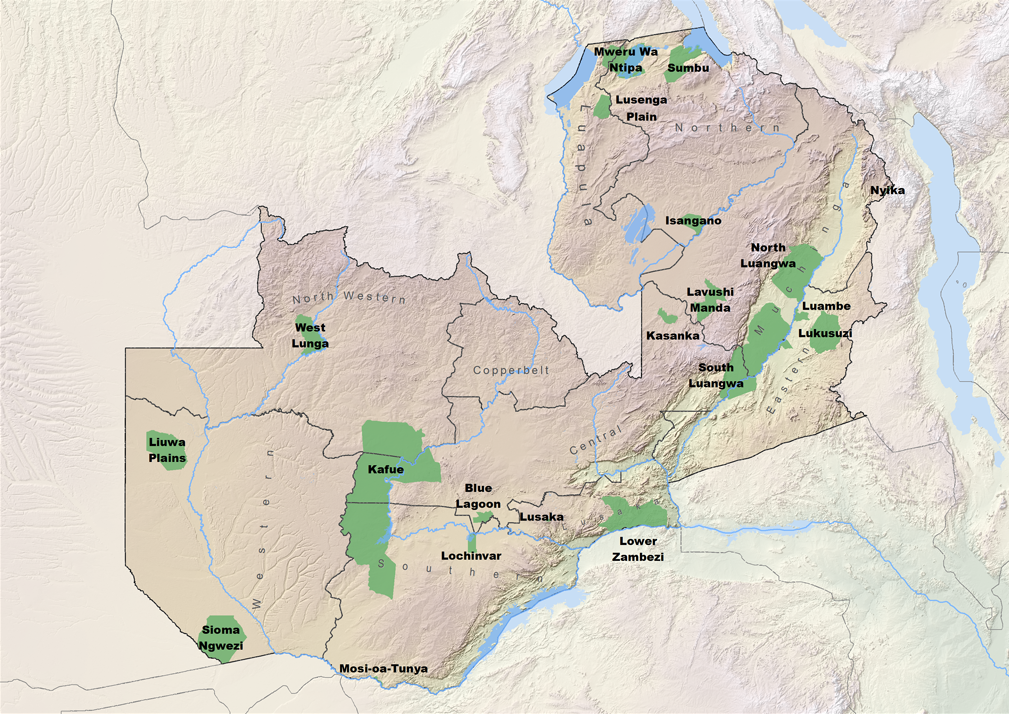
Map showing the twenty National Parks of Zambia

== Alphabetical list ==
- Blue Lagoon National Park — a small park in the north of the Kafue Flats west of Lusaka, known chiefly for bird life; one lodge
- Isangano National Park — northern margin of Bangweulu wetlands, no facilities, extensive illegal human settlement and poaching, little wildlife but good birdlife
- Kafue National Park — world-famous for its animals, one of the world's largest national parks, several lodges
- Kasanka National Park — privately operated, south of the Bangweulu Wetlands, one lodge
- Lavushi Manda National Park — south-east of the Bangweulu Wetlands, no facilities, little wildlife
- Liuwa Plain National Park — in the remote far west, no facilities but some large herds of animals
- Lochinvar National Park — a small park south of the Kafue Flats world-famous for bird life and herds of lechwe, one lodge
- Lower Zambezi National Park — east of Lusaka, offers good wildlife viewing on the Zambezi River; numerous lodges
- Luambe National Park — a small park, close to South Luangwa National Park, recovering after previous neglect, one new lodge
- Lukusuzi National Park — east of Luambe, undeveloped but with potential
- Lusaka National Park — opened in 2015, a small park on the south-east side of the capital city Lusaka
- Lusenga Plain National Park — east of Lake Mweru, improved staffing, control and access (2026), little wildlife, some restocking
- Mosi-oa-Tunya National Park (Victoria Falls National Park) — the small park for Victoria Falls on the edge of the city of Livingstone (where accommodation is available), includes a small 'safari park'
- Mweru Wantipa National Park — no facilities, neglected, little wildlife but has potential for redevelopment, good birdlife
- North Luangwa National Park — this reserve has no facilities and is closed except to specially-licensed tours
- Nsumbu National Park (also known as Sumbu) — once ranked in top 3 but suffered decline, now being improved and restocked with animals, 1 lodge inside and 1 outside, historic Kasaba Bay lodge/airport yet to be redeveloped (2026)
- Nyika National Park — famous for its highland scenery and vegetation rather than wildlife; one lodge, but reached from the park of the same name in Malawi
- Sioma Ngwezi National Park — in the remote far south-west, no facilities but some large herds of animals
- South Luangwa National Park — world-famous as an icon of African wildlife, numerous lodges
- West Lunga National Park — no facilities, no easy access, neglected, little wildlife but has potential for redevelopment.

== Administration ==
The national parks are administered by the Department of National Parks and Wildlife, part of the Ministry of Tourism. Zambia’s economic and financial downturn in the 1980s resulted in a lack of funds for conservation management and anti-poaching measures, as well as for Park infrastructure and staff. The austerity and privatisation era of the 1990s did not yield quick results, but there has been improvement in the economy and recovery in the tourism sector since. The goals laid out in the 2018–2038 Tourism Master Plan are to increase tourism's contribution to Zambia’s economy, targeting growth in revenue from US$562.9 million to US$3.8 billion, and growth in employment, by 2038. The vision is for Zambia to be among Africa’s top holiday destinations and a regional conference hub, with the National Parks as the key drawcard.

Protection of national parks and wildlife is government policy in Zambia. Public-Private Partnerships (PPP) in the development of visitor facilities in national parks is seen as a preferred option where reliable partners can be found, and community engagement is now seen as a key to reducing poaching and encroachment by illegal settlement and subsistence farming, hunting and fishing in national parks. Community engagement includes education of the public, community sensitisation to aspects of wildlife ecology to reduce wildlife-human conflicts, given that elephant, lion, hippotamus, crocodile and buffalo populations in particular can pose a threat to villagers and their crops. Examples of these aspects are included in the Nsumbu and Isangano articles in particular.

Of 20 parks, five have never had management or facilities and have little wildlife apart from birds: Isangano, Lavushi Manda, Lusenga Plain, West Lunga, and Mweru Wantipa; three have substantial wildlife but have hitherto been left undeveloped as a matter of policy or because a neighbouring park has been favoured: North Luangwa, Luambe, and Lukusuzi; and three have wildlife but have been too remote to develop: Liuwa Plain, Sioma Ngwezi, and Nyika Plateau. Of the remainder, most are in quite good shape, with Nsumbu in 2026 showing a recovery in wildlife numbers.

In approximate order of importance in terms of wildlife resources, the eight main functioning parks, all with access and accommodation are:

- South Luangwa National Park
- Kafue National Park
- Lower Zambezi National Park
- Nsumbu National Park
- Kasanka National Park
- Lochinvar National Park
- Blue Lagoon National Park
- Mosi-oa-Tunya National Park

== See also ==
- Wildlife of Zambia
- Ecoregions of Zambia
