= Kafue (disambiguation) =

Kafue may refer to:

- Kafue River, a major river Zambia, tributary of the Zambezi
- Kafue, a town in the Lusaka Province of Zambia
- Kafue District, a district in the Lusaka Province of Zambia
- Kafue (constituency), a parliamentary constituency in Zambia
- Kafue Celtic F.C., a football team in Zambia
- Kafue National Park, the largest national park in Zambia
- Kafue Flats, a flood plain in Zambia
- Kafue Gorge Lower Power Station, a hydroelectric power station in Zambia
- Kafue Gorge Upper Power Station, a hydroelectric power station in Zambia
- Kafue Railway Bridge, a railway bridge across the Kafue River
- Kafue lechwe, a species of lechwe
- Kafue mole-rat, a species of rodent in the family Bathyergidae
