= Wildlife of Zambia =

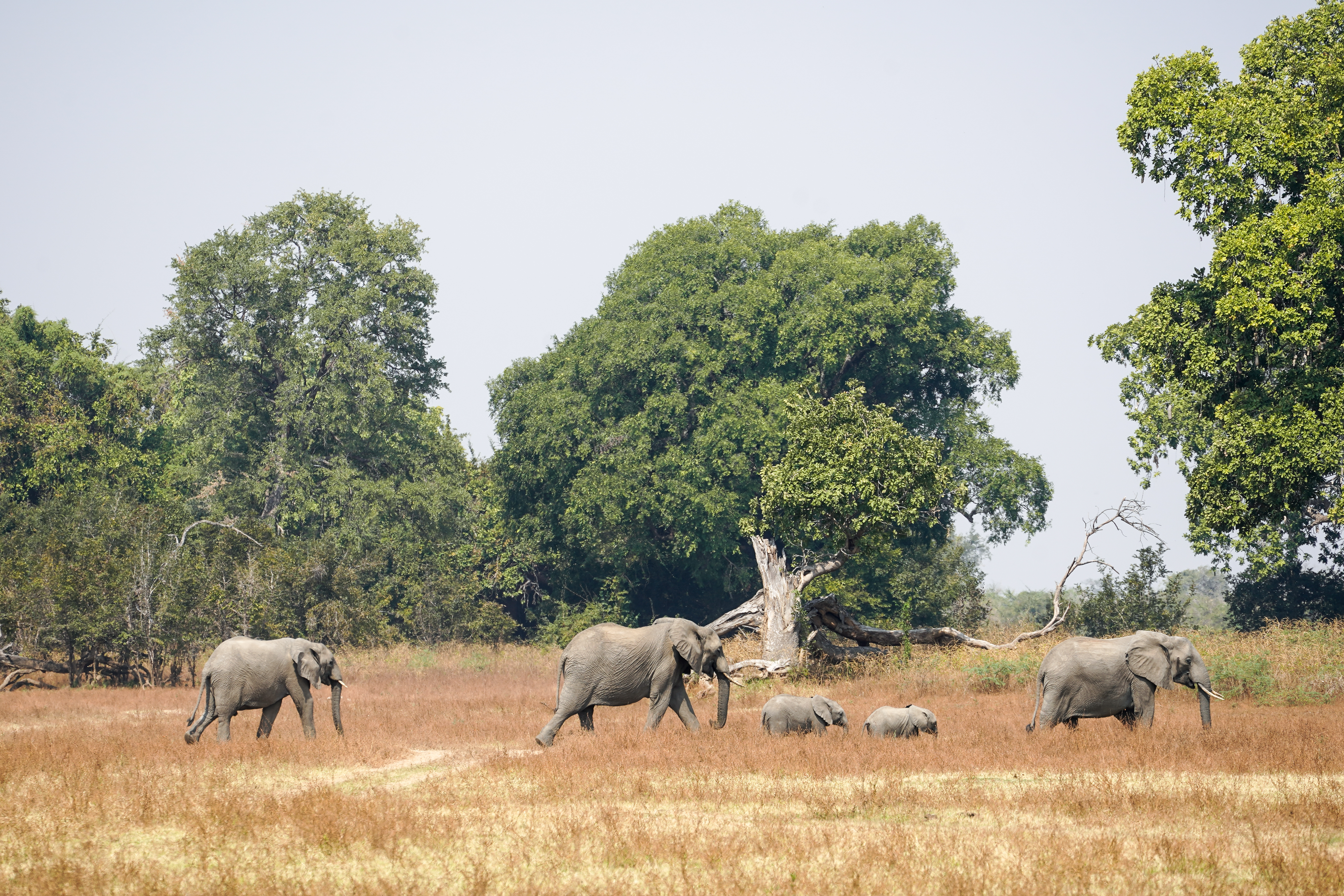
Upper Lupande Game Management Area (GMA)

The wildlife of Zambia refers to the natural flora and fauna of Zambia. This article provides an overview, and outline of the main wildlife areas or regions, and compact lists of animals focusing on prevalence and distribution in the country rather than on taxonomy. More specialized articles on particular groups are linked from here.

== Overview ==
=== Ecoregions ===
Using the World Wildlife Fund's classification of ecoregions, Zambia may include miombo, mopane and Baikiaea woodland savanna, with grasslands (mainly flooded grasslands) and evergreen forest also present. The chief determinant of the distribution of ecoregions and wildlife is climate. See Climate of Zambia for more detail.

=== Animals outside the national parks ===
Zambia's "big game" wildlife (including sports fishing) is the foundation of its tourism industry now. One of its biggest employers and foreign-exchange earners: Victoria Falls and cultural events come second and third in importance. However for domestic tourism, this order is reversed and wildlife is not as important, since the national parks and game viewing tours, through which the great majority of the wildlife is experienced, are priced and marketed to international tourism.

In the early part of the 20th century, most of Zambia's rural areas supported wildlife at levels similar to that seen in national parks today, and the 'big five' game animals were widespread outside reserves and parks. Of them today, the rhinoceros is almost extinct. The elephant and lion are found almost exclusively in parks, and the African buffalo is found in or close to parks. Of the other large animals, only the spotted hyena, Nile crocodile, hippopotamus, and lechwe are found in numbers outside parks. The former from its success as a scavenger, the latter three since their aquatic habit has less overlap with human activities.

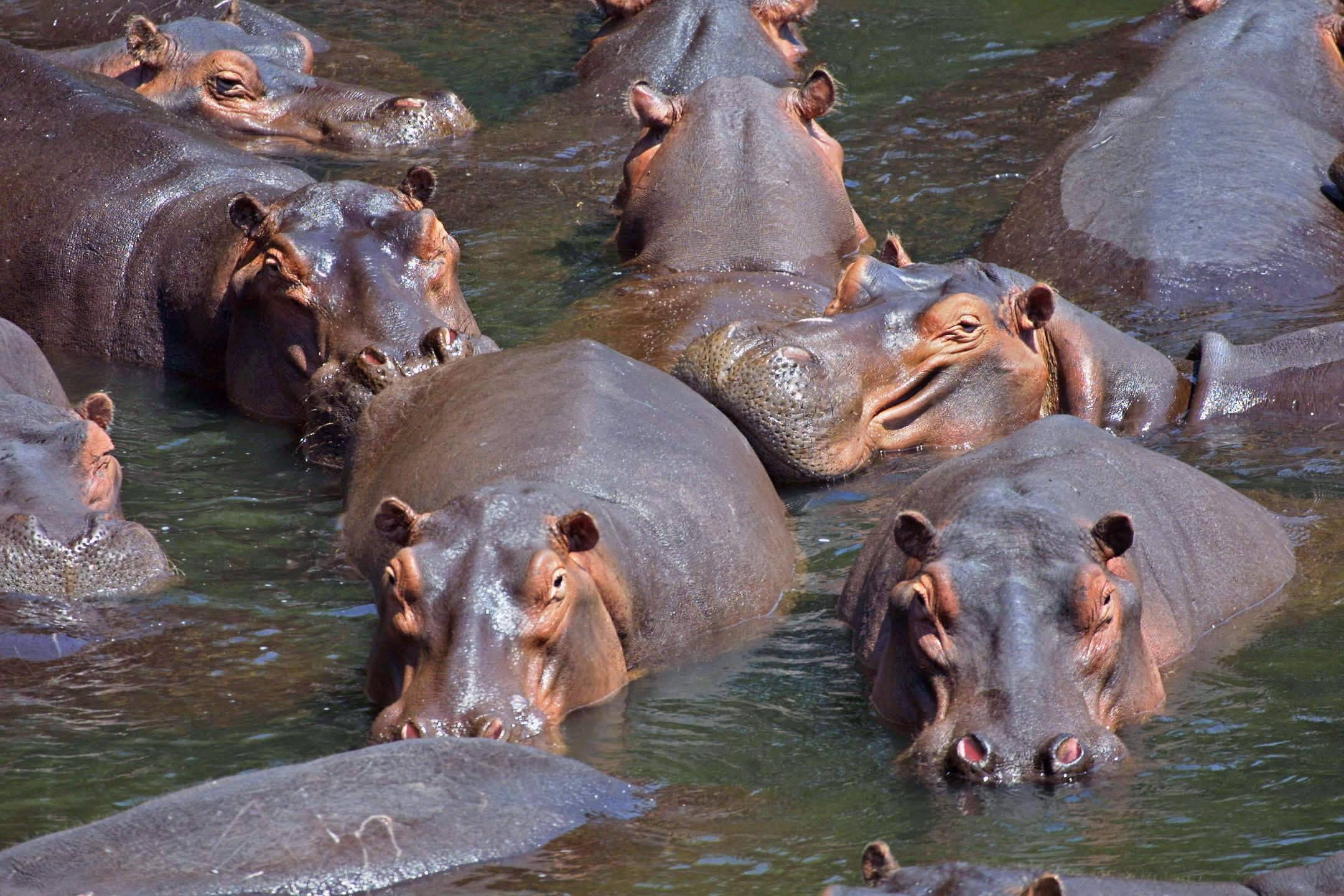
Pod of hippopotamuses

The cause of this decline is the four-fold increase in human population in the last fifty years and consequent loss of habitat, especially of forest and woodland. Although commercial farming and ranching is responsible for land-clearing and the elimination of carnivores and competing herbivores, the amount of land used commercially is actually small. The more widespread and less intensive subsistence farming known as chitemene shifting cultivation is more to blame (responsible for about 9000 km^{2} of woodland deforestation per year), along with charcoal production (responsible for about 2000 km^{2} of woodland deforestation per year).

Secondly, poverty has accompanied the population growth. In the economic boom of the 1940s and 1950s, the mines and factories of the Copperbelt provided wages to pay for food grown commercially on a relatively small amount of land. A large decrease in such employment over the past two or three decades has forced more people back to the rural areas to carry out subsistence agriculture and fishing, which puts pressure on a greater area of wildlife habitat. Increased unreliability of wet season rainfall, perhaps caused by global warming, exacerbates the problem.

Thirdly, poor environmental management by government and a certain amount of corruption in some quarters has allowed poaching and uncontrolled exploitation of resources. Some national parks have had no management at all. In previous centuries, traditional rulers had greater control of hunting and natural resources. For example Lewanika, king of Barotseland, established the Liuwa Plain game reserve which today is a national park. The possibility of recruiting chiefs as modern-day managers of natural resources is hampered by rivalries with political leaders. The downgrading of their status and power by government and the erosion of traditional culture by modern materialism has also worsened the situation.

Against this background, the animals which continue to flourish in Zambia outside parks are those with little food or other resource value, with less overlap with human habitat, or which can survive in human habitats. These include: most birds, except those whose breeding habitats are reduced; smaller mammals, such as bats, shrews, rodents, mongooses, the nocturnal small cats, vervet monkeys and galagos; and reptiles such as the Nile monitor and most snakes and lizards, except forest species.

=== Animals in protected areas ===
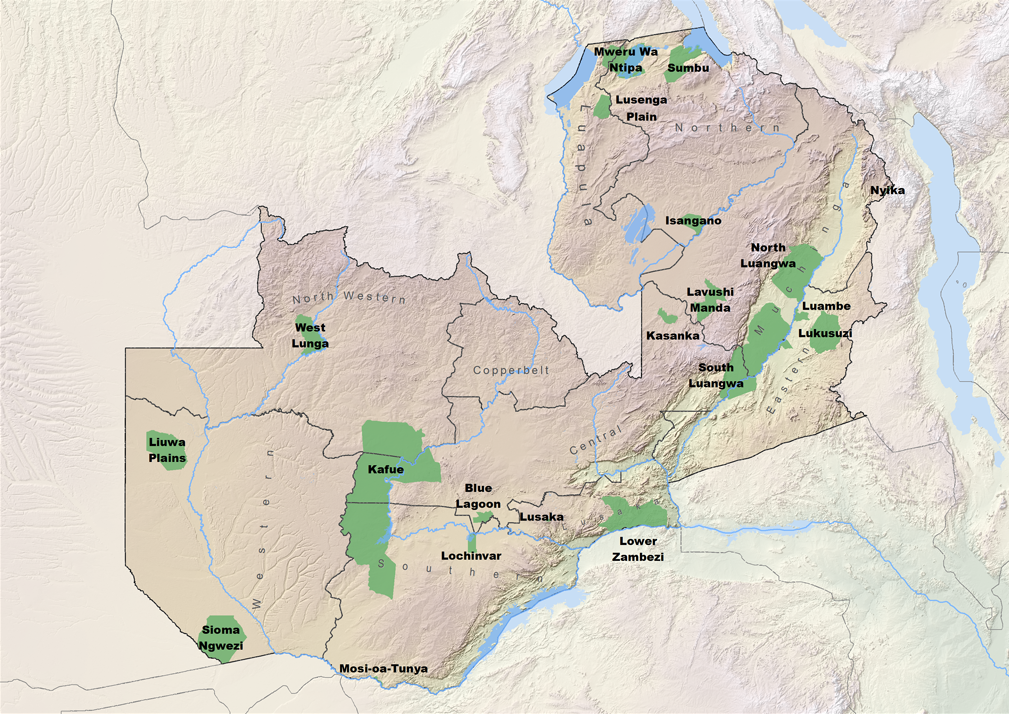
Map showing Zambia's 20 national parks

Five out of 20 national parks have lost most of their wildlife due to a lack of management. Of the remaining 15, two exist primarily for features other than wildlife (Nyika Plateau and Victoria Falls), and the rest have reasonably good wildlife resources despite some poaching.

National parks protect 6.4% of the country. They all have larger game management areas (GMAs) as buffer zones around them in which hunting is subject to regulation, as it is in forest reserves which have additional regulations about land clearing and timber harvesting. Adequate patrolling and the enforcing of regulations has always been a problem, and illegal hunting and bush clearing still happens within protected areas.

GMAs cover 15.6% of the country and forest reserves cover 7.2%, so 29.2% of the country is protected in theory (based on 1992 figures).

== Wildlife regions ==
The main wildlife-rich areas of the country are:

=== Northern Province ===
- Nsumbu National Park/Kaputa GMA/Mweru Wantipa National Park is a contiguous area stretching from the hills at the north-east end of Lake Mweru to Lake Tanganyika. It is rich in wildlife, particularly at the eastern end on the shores of Lake Tanganyika. It has been under pressure due to the Second Congo War in neighbouring DR Congo and a consequent influx of refugees. Mweru Wantipa has seen an influx of people engaged in fishing, and protection in the west of this region has not been enforced for decades.
- The transnational waters of Lake Tanganyika support a great diversity of fish, much of it unique and exploited by the international aquarium trade, as well as crocodile, hippo and aquatic birds. The often precipitous sides of the rift valley extending around the south-eastern extremity of the lake to Kalambo Falls are also a wildlife habitat for birds, smaller mammals, reptiles and leopards.
- Bangweulu Wetlands: these are internationally recognised wetlands and their south-eastern buffer zone include: Lavushi Manda and Isangano National Parks, and the Chambeshi, Luwingu and Bangweulu GMAs. Kasanka in Central Province is also part of the southern buffer zone. The wetlands are vital for the breeding of a number of bird species and as a feeding ground for migratory birds, as well as for the black lechwe, sitatunga and numerous large mammals. They are under pressure from poaching, fishing and livestock grazing, and chitemene cultivation on the margins.

=== Muchinga Province ===
- Muchinga escarpment overlooking the Luangwa Valley: the rocky hills and scarps do not host a huge amount of wildlife, but smaller mammals, birds and leopards do make it their home. Although North and the northern part of South Luangwa National Park are technically in the Muchinga Province, primary access to the parks is from Eastern Province so they are covered in that section.
- Nyika National Park: the Nyika Plateau in the north-east is mostly in Malawi. Zambia's small portion is noted for its montane vegetation, orchids and other vegetation, as well as herds of eland, zebra and other animals such as leopards.

=== Luapula Province ===
- Lake Mweru-Luapula River system: the Zambian side of this transnational lake and river system has a relatively high human population. Wildlife is restricted mainly to the plentiful bird life, and aquatic animals in the lake and swamps, such as hippos, crocodiles and otters. The lechwe population which grazed the floodplain mainly on the Congolese side has been hunted out. The lake and swamp lagoons have been heavily fished and stocks depleted.
- The inaccessible Lusenga Plain National Park on the plateau east of the lake has been heavily depleted by poaching.
- Lake Bangweulu: the south-east of Luapula Province extends over the lake and into the swamps: see the wetlands ecosystem under Northern Province, above. Crocodiles are plentiful in the lake which is also home to hippo. The lake fish stocks have also been depleted.

=== Eastern Province ===
- Most of the Luangwa Valley is protected by national parks or GMAs comprising one of the world's greatest wildlife areas: North Luangwa National Park, South Luangwa National Park, Luambe National Park and Lukusuzi National Parks, and Munyamadzi, Musalangu, Mukumgule, Lupande, Lumimba, Sandwe, Chisomo GMAs. Animals are plentiful and mostly well-protected, though poaching of elephant and rhinoceros has been a problem in the recent past.
- In the Luangwa Valley over 100,000 elephants were killed by poachers in a twelve-year period between 1973-1985. Zambia as a whole lost over 80% of its elephant population during that period.

=== Copperbelt Province ===
The most urban and industrial of Zambia's provinces lacks wildlife, except in the south-west where in flooded grassland habitats interspersed with miombo woodland, and except for birdlife, which is well represented near rivers and small lakes between towns.

- Chembe Bird Sanctuary west of Kitwe includes crocodiles and sitatunga as well as plentiful bird life.

=== Central Province ===
- The north-east of this province reaches the margins of the Bangweulu wetlands – see Northern Province – and includes Kasanka National Park.
- The eastern end of the province reaches South Luangwa National Park but the latter's access is in Eastern Province, see above.
- Kafue National Park and the Mulobezi, Sichifulo, Mumbwa, Kasonso-Busanga, Lunga-Luswishi, Namwala, Bilili Springs, and Nkala GMAs are the second most important wildlife area in the country, so large that it is spread across two other provinces – Southern and North Western. The Busanga Swamps and plain in the north hosts the largest concentration of mammals and birds, while the Kafue River and lake of the Itezhi-Tezhi Dam are home to hippos, crocodiles and aquatic birds as well as being well stocked with fish.
- The northern part of the Kafue Flats and Blue Lagoon National Park are in Central Province, but are treated under Southern Province, below.
- The Lunsemfwa and Lukusashi River valleys and their northern escarpment, at the western end of the Luangwa Valley, lie in Central Province and represent a wildlife area with some potential, protected by GMAs to some extent.
- Lukanga Swamp bordering the Lunga-Luswishi GMA and its less populated western margin is potentially a wildlife haven, especially for aquatic birds and animals, but is heavily fished.

=== Lusaka Province ===
- Lower Zambezi National Park and adjacent Chiawa, Luano, and Rufunsa GMAs make up the third most important wildlife region, with most of the Zambian fauna represented. The Zambezi river also provides aquatic habitats. The opposite bank of the river in Zimbabwe is also national park and animals may cross the river.
- The southern side of the Lunsemfwa River valley and the lower Luangwa valley border Lusaka province, and provide good wildlife habitats protected by GMAs.
- The Kafue Flats extend slightly into the south-western part of Lusaka Province, but are treated under Southern Province, below.
- Lusaka National Park is a small wildlife reserve which was established in 2011.

=== North-Western Province ===
- Game-rich Busanga in Kafue National Park is part of North-Western Province and animals from the park range into the Kasonso-Busanga GMA.
- West Lunga National Park and its adjacent Chibwika-Ntambo, Lukwakwa and Musele-Matebo GMAs are undeveloped and have been depleted but hold promise for recovery.
- The western extremity of the province include the Zambezi and its floodplain, treated under Western Province.

=== Western Province ===
- The Zambezi River and its wide Barotse Floodplain represent a vast fish and aquatic wildlife habitat, important also for many grazing animals and birds. Islands in the river and floodplain present habitats where birds may nest with relative freedom from predators.
- The Liuwa Plain and Sioma Ngwezi National Parks and the vast West Zambezi GMA comprise plains which are home to thousands of grazing animals. Neighboring Angola is recovering from the civil war there.
- The dry teak forests of the south-eastern part of the province have been over-exploited and the wildlife, never very common on the sandy soils, has also suffered.

=== Southern Province ===
This has the highest proportion of commercial farmland of any Zambian province. In these areas, wildlife has been displaced. However, the north-east part of the state includes Kafue National Park (see Central Province above), as well as:

- The Kafue Flats, a huge floodplain and an important wildlife habitat principally for lechwe, and aquatic and other birds. Over 400 bird species have been recorded at the small Lochinvar National Park, famous among bird-watchers throughout the world. The northern part of the flats, including the Blue Lagoon National Park are in Central Province, while the north-eastern end extends slightly into Lusaka Province. The ecology of the floodplain has been adversely affected by the Itezhi-Tezhi Dam.
- Lake Kariba: the more populated Zambian side of the lake has less diverse wildlife than the Zimbabwean side, but the lake is still a significant site for fish and aquatic animals and birds.
- Zambezi River, Victoria Falls National Park, Batoka Gorge, and Kariba Gorge and Kafue Gorge in the east: in Southern Province the river does not have a broad flood plain as it does in Western Province, but the river and islands are still a good wildlife habitat. The gorges are a haven for raptors, reptiles and small mammals.

== Mammals ==
=== Primates ===
- Mohol galago (South African lesser bushbaby, Galago moholi) – common, but nocturnal, not often seen
- Brown greater galago (bushbaby, Otolemur crassicaudatus) – very small with large eyes. Quite common, but nocturnal, and not often seen
- Vervet monkey (Chlorocebus pygerythrus) – the most common monkey, seen in large groups, often feeding on the ground
- Yellow baboon (Papio cynocephalus) – central and eastern regions, common in large groups
- Chacma baboon (Papio ursinus) – southern regions, common in large groups
- Kinda baboon (Papio kindae) – northern regions, common in large groups

=== Carnivores ===
- Lion (Panthera leo melanochaita) – powerful top predators, usually hunt in the open in prides; common in Kafue and Luangwa, also seen in Lower Zambezi NP. They are rare or locally extinct elsewhere and very vulnerable
- African leopard (Panthera pardus pardus) – common, hides well and rarely seen. It hunts at night and conceals itself well. It is a good climber and often seen in trees. It is capable of killing prey much larger than themselves, and occasionally still a danger to villagers in remote areas
- Spotted hyena (Crocuta crocuta) – common predator and scavenger, travelling and hunting in groups, competing with lions
- South African cheetah (Acinonyx jubatus jubatus) – occurs in Zambia only on the plains of northern Kafue It hunts in the daytime but rarely seen, and very vulnerable
- Cape wild dog (Lycaon pictus pictus) – occurs in Lukusuzi National Park
- Caracal (Caracal caracal) – occurs in Kafue and Luangwa National Parks, but very rarely seen
- Side-striped jackal (Canis adustus) – common in Kafue National Park
- Serval (Leptailurus serval) – common
- Common genet (Genetta genetta) – common but nocturnal and rarely seen
- African wildcat (Felis lybica) – fairly common but rarely seen except at night
- African civet (Civettictis civetta) – common but nocturnal and rarely seen
- Mongoose – eight mongoose species except the meerkat are present in Zambia. They are all quite common and easily seen. The marsh mongoose only occurs near water sources.
- African clawless otter (Aonyx capensis) – common in Kafue and Lochinvar National Parks
- Speckle-throated otter (Lutra maculicollis) – common
- African striped weasel (Poecilogale albinucha) – rarely seen
- Striped polecat (zorilla, Ictonyx striatus) – rarely seen
- Honey badger (Mellivora capensis) – quite common

=== Odd-toed ungulates ===
- Southern white rhinoceros (Ceratotherium simum simum) near threatened and has since been introduced to suitable habitats in Zambia (note that the white rhinoceros is not indigenous to Zambia)
- South-central black rhinoceros (Diceros bicornis minor) – critically endangered and wiped out by poaching in most of its habitat in Zambia. It has been reintroduced in a few locations such as North Luangwa
- Plains zebra (Equus quagga) – common and easily seen in most parks, in quite large herds, often with wildebeest, Burchell's zebras (Equus quagga boehmi) are found at the western regions and Crawshay's zebra (Equus quagga crawshayi) are found at the eastern regions

=== Even-toed ungulates ===
- African buffalo (Cape buffalo, Syncerus caffer) – very large herds in northern Kafue. sizeable herds elsewhere, with a reputation for being dangerous
- Bushpig (Potamochoerus larvatus) – common but secretive and rarely seen
- Rhodesian giraffe (Giraffa tippelskirchi thornicrofti) – common in Luangwa, less so elsewhere
- Hippopotamus (Hippopotamus amphibius) – common in most large rivers and lakes. Often seen in large herds, but listed as vulnerable
- Warthog (Phacochoerus africanus) – common, usually seen in family groups or pairs feeding on roots and grasses

==== Antelope ====
- Blue wildebeest (gnu, Connochaetes taurinus) – large grey-brown antelope, common, often in large herds
- Bushbuck (Tragelaphus scriptus) – light brown coat, dark in places, with up to seven white stripes and white splotches on the sides; not rare but difficult to see, normally hide in dense cover
- Common duiker (Sylvicapra grimmia) common, but very small, hides in thickets; several other species found in Zambia: blue duiker (Cephalophus monticola), yellow-backed duiker (Cephalophus silvicultor), red forest duiker (Cephalophus natalensis)
- Common eland (Tragelaphus oryx) – the largest antelope, weighing about 600 kg
- Greater kudu (Tragelaphus strepsiceros) – males have unmistakable large spiralling horns, both sexes have large rounded ears
- Impala (Aepyceros melampus) – medium-sized, common in large groups, known for characteristic jumping when startled
- Klipspringer (Oreotragus oreotragus) – a smallish stocky antelope with hooves adapted to climbing rocks, like a mountain goat, shy, seen only in Luangwa, rarely
- Lechwe (Kobus leche) – an antelope of swamps and floodplains often found wading and grazing floating vegetation, it occurs in huge herds in the Bangweulu swamps (black subspecies), smaller herds on the Kafue Flats and Busanga Plain (red and Kafue subspecies)
- Lichtenstein's hartebeest (Alcelaphus lichtensteinii) – found on floodplains, dambos and savannahs, common in Kafue
- Oribi (Ourebia ourebi) – a small antelope of grassland habitats, common in Kafue
- Puku (Kobus vardonii) – a mid-sized antelope with a fuzzy coat, common on dambos and other wet grasslands of northern/north-western Zambia
- Sable antelope (Hippotragus niger) – large antelope with a deep brown or black coat, white belly and face, with long backward-arching horns, very similar to a roan antelope
- Roan antelope (Hippotragus equinus) – similar to the sable antelope but with a lighter, redder coat; fairly common in Kafue
- Sharpe's grysbok (Raphicerus sharpei) – a small shy solitary antelope similar to a duiker, quite common
- Sitatunga (Tragelaphus spekii) – dark forequarters and a light brown body and hind quarters, delicately marked with white spots and stripes, this is a seldom-seen medium to large antelope of papyrus swamps in which it can swim to escape predators; rare in Kafue, often seen in Kasanka NP and Bangweulu
- Southern reedbuck (Redunca arundinum) – common in Kafue grazing on dambos
- Steenbok (steinbok, Raphicerus campestris) – small antelope similar to the oribi, occasionally seen in Kafue
- Topi (tsessebe, Damaliscus lunatus) – a large fast-running antelope, dark brown with yellow markings on the legs, which occurs in groups on plains, not common
- Waterbuck (Kobus ellipsiprymnus) – long-haired, often shaggy with a brown-grey coat and a white ring on the rump, common in Luangwa, often in large herds, but the defassa subspecies common in Kafue and Sumbu has a white patch instead

==== Other mammals ====
- Aardvark (Orycteropus afer) – anteater, constructs large burrows often taken over by other animals
- Yellow-spotted rock hyrax (Heterohyrax brucei) and Cape hyrax (Procavia capensis) – common rabbit-sized creatures related to elephants, seen in rocky areas
- African bush elephant (Loxodonta africana) – poached for ivory and decimated to local extinction in some areas, but still common in some national parks, large herds in Kafue, Luangwa, Lower Zambezi
- Ground pangolin (Manis temminckii) – an anteater, armoured with scales, rolls into a ball when disturbed; fairly common, nocturnal, rarely seen

== Reptiles ==
- Nile crocodile (Crocodylus niloticus) – prevalent in all large river and swamp systems as well as in lakes and lagoons, with large populations in some areas such as the Luangwa River; in Lake Bangweulu they represent a common hazard for fishermen
- Nile monitor (Varanus niloticus) – one of the largest lizards, growing to length of two metres, common throughout Zambia; a good swimmer, is often found by rivers and swamps
- Savannah monitor (Varanus albigularis) – shy because of burrowing habits, common in savana and grassland
- Chameleon – common but not easily seen due to its camouflage

=== Snakes ===
- Southern African python (Python natalensis) – the largest snake in Southern Africa, non-venomous, common in most rural areas
- Black mamba (Dendroaspis polylepis) – a large venomous fast-moving snake, common in most rural areas
- Black-necked spitting cobra (Naja nigricollis) – quite common, sprays venom when cornered
- Boomslang (Dispholidus typus) – a common green tree snake, venomous but timid
- Puff adder (Bitis arietans) – common venomous snake thought to be responsible for most bites of humans because it is well camouflaged and remains motionless when approached, and will bite when unwittingly stepped on
- Gaboon viper (Bitis gabonica) – the largest viper and one of the most intricately patterned, venomous, found only in woodland savanna and forests in the north of the country, rare

== See also ==
- List of national parks of Zambia
