= Zambezian flooded grasslands =

Flooded grassland ecoregion in Africa

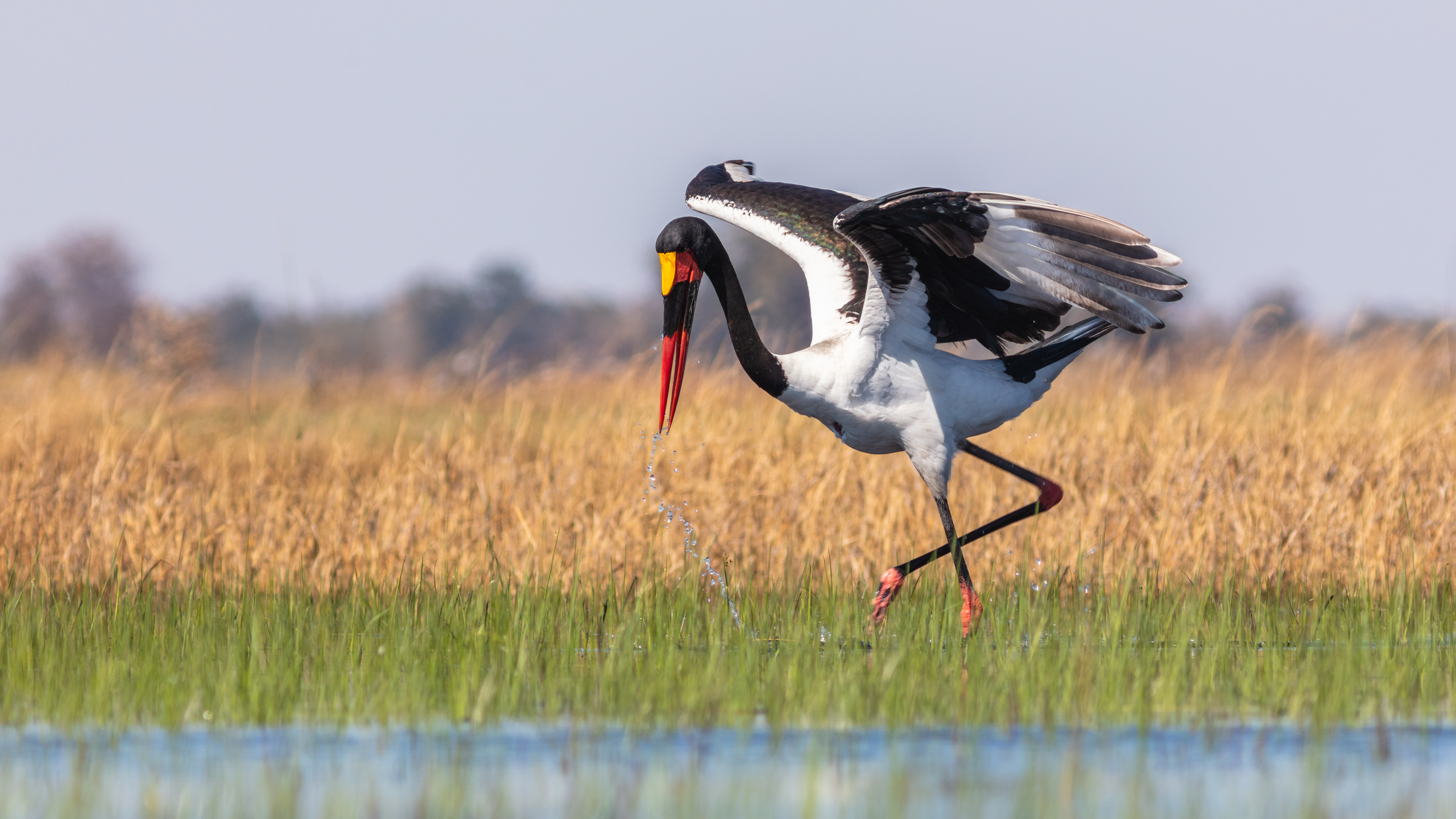
- Saddle-billed stork (Ephippiorhynchus senegalensis) in Botswana's Okavango Delta.

- Map showing the Zambezian flooded grasslands

Ecology
- Realm: Afrotropical
- Biome: Flooded grasslands and savannas

Geography
- Area: 153,600 km^{2} (59,300 sq mi)
- Countries: Angola, Botswana, Democratic Republic of the Congo, Malawi, Mozambique, Namibia, Tanzania, and Zambia

Conservation
- Conservation status: relatively stable/intact

The Zambezian flooded grasslands is an ecoregion of southern and eastern Africa that is rich in wildlife.

== Setting ==
The Zambezian flooded grasslands can be found on seasonally- or permanently-flooded lowlands in the basin of the Zambezi and neighboring river basins. These enclaves lie in the Zambezian region, a broad belt of seasonally-dry miombo and mopane savannas and woodlands that extend east and west across Africa, from northern Botswana, Namibia, and Angola in the west to Tanzania and Mozambique in the east.

Large enclaves of flooded grassland include:

- Kilombero Valley and Mkata Plain in southern Tanzania
- Malagarasi-Muyovozi floodplain and Ugalla River floodplain in western Tanzania
- Wembere River-Lake Kitangiri floodplain in Tanzania
- The Okavango Delta in Botswana
- around Lake Chilwa in Malawi
- The Barotse Floodplain, Kafue Flats, Busanga Swamp, and Lukanga Swamp in the Zambezi basin of Zambia.
- The upper Chambeshi River, Bangweulu Swamp, the Luapula River delta south of Lake Mweru, and Lake Mweru Wantipa in Zambia.

The region has a tropical climate with a hot wet summer between November and March.

== Flora ==
These patches of wetland contain grassland and swamp vegetation which varies from area to area within this widely spread ecoregion.

== Fauna ==
Even during the dry season, the floodplains sustain a great deal of wildlife including grazing African buffalo, wildebeest, and elephants, zebras, and giraffes, as well as hippopotamus and crocodiles in the waters. There are many antelopes such as waterbucks, pukus, elands, and lechwe, the Bangwelu Swamp in particular is home to black lechwe (Kobus leche smithermani), tsessebe, and sitatunga while the Kafue Flats have large groups of Kafue lechwe and Burchell's zebra.

The large numbers of birds, especially waterbirds, in the floodplains include saddle-billed storks. There are two endemic reptiles; the Merara toad (Amietophrynus reesi) in the Kilombero valley, and the Barotse water snake (Crotaphopeltis barotseensis).

== Threats and preservation ==
Despite the tsetse fly and the swampy water the floodplains have long been home to rural communities, such as the Lozi people in the Barotse Floodplain and the Tonga in the Kafue Flats, but are mostly unspoilt and large areas are protected. However, wildlife is still vulnerable to poaching and illegal farming or grazing of livestock. Meanwhile as the population in this part of Africa is continually growing demand for water and farmland places the floodplains under constant threat as land is polluted or farmed, grassland set on fire and rivers are dammed or diverted. The Kafue Flats have been drastically changed by the damming of the river and similar projects are planned for the Okavango.

Protected areas include the Okavango Delta, the Bangweulu, Moyowosi and Kilombero swamps and the Kafue Flats and in addition Lake Chilwa is a Ramsar birding area. Of these Okavango is the largest and best-known, being mostly within the Moremi Game Reserve, having spectacular wildlife and a well-developed safari industry based in the town of Maun. In Zambia Lochinvar and Blue Lagoon National Parks are protected.

== References and external links ==
- Media related to Zambezian Flooded Grasslands Ecoregion at Wikimedia Commons
- "Zambezian flooded savannas". Terrestrial Ecoregions. World Wildlife Fund.
