= Hippo grass =

Hippo grass is a fairly common name for several plants and may refer to:

- Echinochloa stagnina
- Vossia cuspidata
