= Barotse barb =

Conservation status
- Least Concern (IUCN 3.1)

Scientific classification
- Kingdom: Animalia
- Phylum: Chordata
- Class: Actinopterygii
- Order: Cypriniformes
- Family: Cyprinidae
- Subfamily: Smiliogastrinae
- Genus: Enteromius
- Species: E. barotseensis

Binomial name
- Enteromius barotseensis (Pellegrin, 1920)

Synonyms
- Barbus barotseensis Pellegrin, 1920

Species of fish

The Barotse barb (Enteromius barotseensis) is a species of ray-finned fish in the genus Enteromius from the southern Congo Basin, Zambezi, Okavango, Cunene and Kafue.

== Footnotes ==
- Froese, Rainer; Pauly, Daniel (eds.). "Enteromius barotseensis". FishBase.
