= Vossia =

Vossia may refer to:

- Vossia (plant), a genus of grass in the family Poaceae
- Vossia (katydid), a genus of bush crickets or katydids in the family Tettigoniidae, subfamily Phaneropterinae
