= Itezhi-Tezhi Dam =

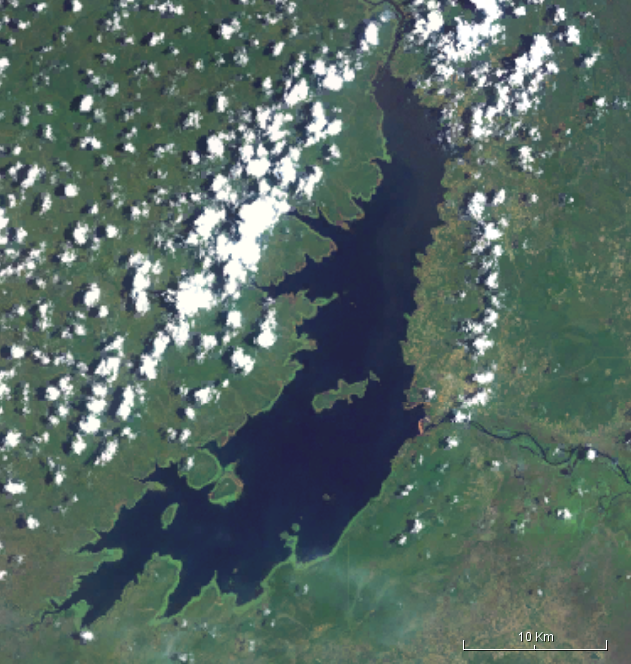

- Zambia
- Location: Itezhi-Tezhi, Zambia
- Coordinates: 15°45′55″S 26°01′05″E
- Construction began: 1974
- Opening date: 1977 (hydroelectric plant 2016)
- Construction cost: 275,000,000 US$

Dam and spillways
- Impounds: Kafue River
- Height: 62 m (203 ft)
- Length: 1.8 km (1.1 mi)

Power Station
- Commission date: February 2016
- Turbines: 2 × 60 MW (80,000 hp)
- Installed capacity: 120 MW (160,000 hp)

The Itezhi-Tezhi Dam on the Kafue River in west-central Zambia was built between 1974 and 1977 at the Itezhi-Tezhi Gap, in a range of hills through which the river had eroded a narrow valley, leading to the broad expanse of the wetlands known as the Kafue Flats. The town of Itezhi-Tezhi is to the east side of the dam.

== Dimensions and purpose ==
The dam has a height of 62 metres (203 ft), a crest length of 1,800 metres (5,900 ft) and forms a reservoir of 390 square kilometres (150 sq mi), flooding a section of the Kafue National Park.

The initial purpose of the dam was to store water for the Kafue Gorge Upper Power Station more than 260 kilometres (160 mi) downstream. The Kafue River, like most in south-central Africa, has a very high seasonal variation, flooding in the rainy season and slowing to perhaps a twentieth of the peak flow rate at the end of the dry season. Power generation however requires a steady flow, which can only be achieved by having a reservoir large enough to store the seasonal flood for use in the dry season. At the Kafue Gorge the topography does not allow a large enough reservoir to form. The designers of the dam therefore had the idea of siting the main reservoir at Itezhi-Tezhi, and releasing the water in a steady flow down the river along the Kafue Flats to the Kafue Gorge Dam.

=== Power station ===
Construction began in 2011 of a 120-megawatt (160,000 hp) power station at the Itezhi-Tezhi Dam and was due for completion in 2015. The $250 million plant will be operated by Itezhi Tezhi Power Company (ITPC), a joint venture between ZESCO, the Zambian state-owned power company, and TATA Africa, a part of Indian conglomerate Tata Group. The engineering, procurement and construction (EPC) contractor is Sinohydro, a Chinese, state-owned hydropower engineering and construction company, while two 60MW Kaplan turbines are being supplied by Alstom.

In 2014, The African Development Bank (AfDB), the Dutch Development Bank FMO, the Development Bank of Southern Africa (DBSA) and Propaco of France provided the Zambian Government with a loan of $142 million to fund approximately half of the project cost. The power station was fully commissioned in February 2016.

== Environmental impact on the Kafue River Flats ==
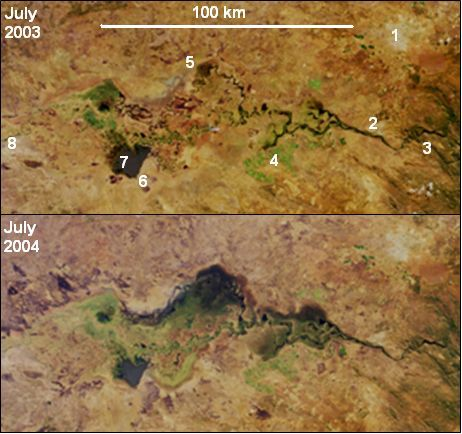
"Not all floods are unwanted"— NASA. The eastern (lower) half of the Kafue Flats in the middle of the dry season, one year apart. Water shows as dark areas, the Kafue's main channel shows as the squiggle running left to right. In early 2004 the floodgates of the Itezhi-Tezhi Dam (about 80 km to the left of the photo) were opened to allow the natural flooding which used to happen before the dam was built. Compared to the previous year, much more of the flats remain inundated in the dry season and there is lot more vegetation (green colour). (Key: 1 Lusaka, 2 Kafue town, 3 Kafue Gorge Dam, 4, Mazabuka and Nakambala Sugar Estates, 5 Blue Lagoon National Park, 6 Lochinvar National Park, 7 Chunga Lagoon, 8 Kasenga.) Photo credit NASA/GSFC/LaRC/JPL, MISR Team.

The Kafue Flats ecosystem is adapted to regular extremes of flooding and drying out. The floods charge the soil with water. Fish and animals adapt to swim or wade, help spread nutrients, and when the waters recede, grasses grow rapidly and sustain herbivores such as buffalo, lechwe, and cattle. The natural seasonal cycle has maintained plants, fish, and animals, as they have adapted to the March–April inundation in their nutrition and breeding. Many of the local residents move their settlements annually to cope with the regular cycle of flooding.

The dam removes the peak of the flooding and the trough of low water in the dry season. It reduces the natural seasonal variation of the river flow. The designers intended for the dam to 'open the floodgates' for the duration of March, and allow a flow of 300 cubic metres per second (11,000 cu ft/s) to flood the Kafue Flats in order to maintain natural cycles. However, this has not happened in practice, mainly because the reservoir has not contained sufficient water at the right times to facilitate such a flow. The demand for electric power takes priority, and this, compounded by erratic rainfall since 1990, has prevented the dam from releasing water at the originally intended flow rates.

The Itezhi-Tezhi Dam has impacted the local ecology of the Kafue Flats in the following ways:

- Fish production has significantly declined;
- Wildlife, such as Lechwe, and Sitatunga, which rely on particular timing and extent of the floods in their breeding grounds, have had their breeding behaviour disrupted, leading to population decline;
- In the dry season the amount of grass for grazing has reduced for both wildlife and cattle, and woody species are invading grasslands on the floodplain;
- There is uncertainty of the timing of flooding, and this disturbs traditional human settlements.

The 2003/4 rainy season saw particularly high rainfall in Zambia. The effect of the Itezhi-Tezhi Dam release during this season is shown in the above NASA photos. According to a NASA website, in June 2004 an agreement was made with the hydroelectricity company to restore water releases from the dams according to a more natural flooding regime, presumably by keeping to the original intention of a 300-cubic-metre-per-second (11,000 cu ft/s) flood for the whole of March.
