= Kafue National Park =

National Park in Zambia

- IUCN category II (national park)
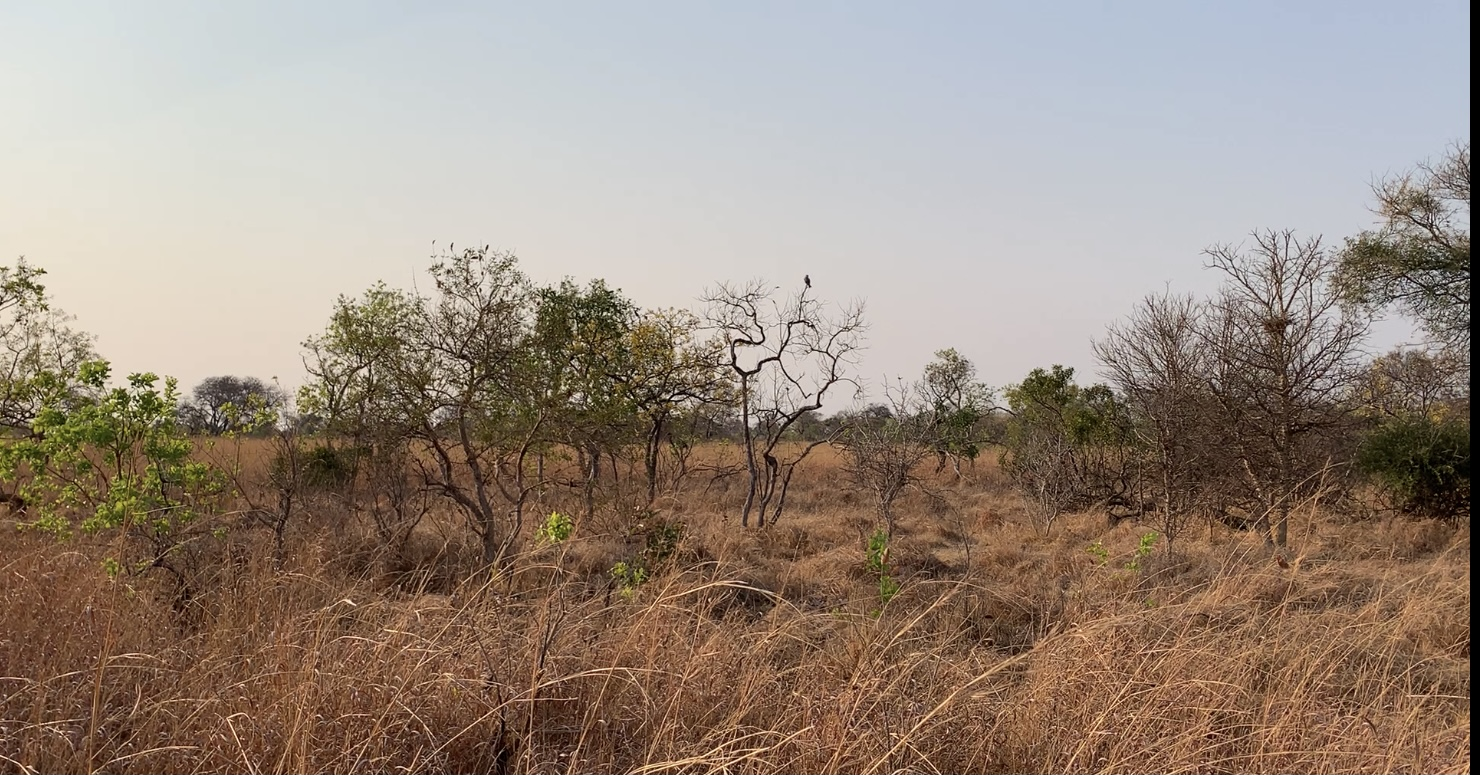

- Location within Zambia
- Location: Zambia
- Coordinates: 15°46′S 25°55′E
- Area: 22,400 km^{2} (8,600 sq mi)
- Established: 1950s
- Governing body: Zambia Wildlife Authority

Kafue National Park is the largest national park in Zambia, covering an area of about 22,400 km^{2} (8,600 sq mi). It is the second largest national park in Africa and home to 152 mammal species. There are also 515 bird species, 70 reptile species, 58 species of fish and 36 amphibious species.

The park is named for the Kafue River. It stretches over three provinces: North Western, Central and Southern. The main access is via the Lusaka–Mongu Road from Lusaka to Mongu which crosses the park north of its centre. Seasonal dirt roads also link from Kalomo and Namwala in the south and south-east, and Kasempa in the north.

== History ==
The Kafue Game Reserve was created in the early 1920s to combat attrition of wildlife resources. Kafue National Park was established in the 1950s by Norman Carr, an influential British-Rhodesian conservationist. Establishment of the park may have been possible after the British colonial government moved the traditional owners of the area, the Nkoya people of Mwene Kabulwebulwe, from their traditional hunting grounds into the Mumbwa District to the east in 1924.

In 2021, Nkoya leaders called to establish a new province in the area, which they propose to name Kafue Province. Dissatisfaction with the pace of development in Central Province and a lack of benefit from tourism in the park are some of the reasons for this demand for an 11th province.

In February 2021, a Priority Support Plan was initiated by Zambia's Department of National Parks and Wildlife (DNPW) and African Parks to secure technical and financial support for the park over a 15-month period. Following the success of this procedure, the Zambian government invited African Parks to enter into a 20-year agreement to manage Kafue.

== Geology and climate ==
The country is generally flat or gently undulating apart from some small, steep porphyritic granite hills between Chonga and Ngoma and occasional sandstone and granite hills around Ngoma rising to 120 m (390 ft). The southwestern part of the Hook granite massif underlies the central part of the park, including schist, gneiss, granite-gneiss and granite. On the edge of the granite massif there are slates, quartzites and limestones from the Katanga sediments of the inner Lufilian Arc. To the north and south of the massif the soil covers Karroo sediments of shales, siltstones, concreted gravels and various types of laterite.

In the northern end of the park the flood plains have clay soils, but otherwise the soils are strongly leached sandy to loamy soils with low fertility. In most of the drainage of the Nanzila river, and in some of the lands around the Nkala, Musa and Lwansanza rivers, there are dark grey alkaline clays. Otherwise, the park is covered by well-drained and relatively infertile pale or orange Kalahari sands mixed with some silt and clay.

The main tributaries to the Kafue river in this park are the Lufupa and Lunga rivers in the north, the Luansanza in the centre and the Musa in the south.

Mean annual rainfall varies from 510 mm (20 in) in the south to more than 1,020 millimetres (40 in) in the north. Dry season is from June-October. The annual mean temperature is 21 °C (70 °F), with a mean maximum from 26 °C (79 °F) in July to 33 °C (91 °F) in October, the hottest month of the year. Winds are mostly light, blowing from the east.

== Habitats and flora ==
Most of the park is covered in miombo woodlands, which are open semi-deciduous forests of trees in the genera Brachystegia, Julbernardia and Isoberlinia, adapted to periodic wildfires. These woodlands have a few small dambos interspersed among them. Evergreen forests of teak and mopane occur in the south and centre.

Large termite mounds in the forests host particular evergreen flora, notably the candelabra tree (Euphorbia ingens), and the jackalberry (Diospyros mespiliformis). These mounds can be huge and are hundreds, even thousands, of years old. Large and small open plains are found throughout the park, often dotted with small termite mounds.

The Kafue River eventually flows into the man-made Itezhi-Tezhi Dam, forming a reservoir partially within the park. An important aquatic plant is the grass Vossia cuspidata, which forms free-floating mats in the river. Aeschynomene elaphroxylon is a problematic weed near Lake Itezhi-tezhi. Mimosa pigra, an invasive shrub, is threatening wattled crane areas.

The Busanga Plains in the far north-west are seasonally flooded grasslands along the Lufupa river.

== Fauna ==
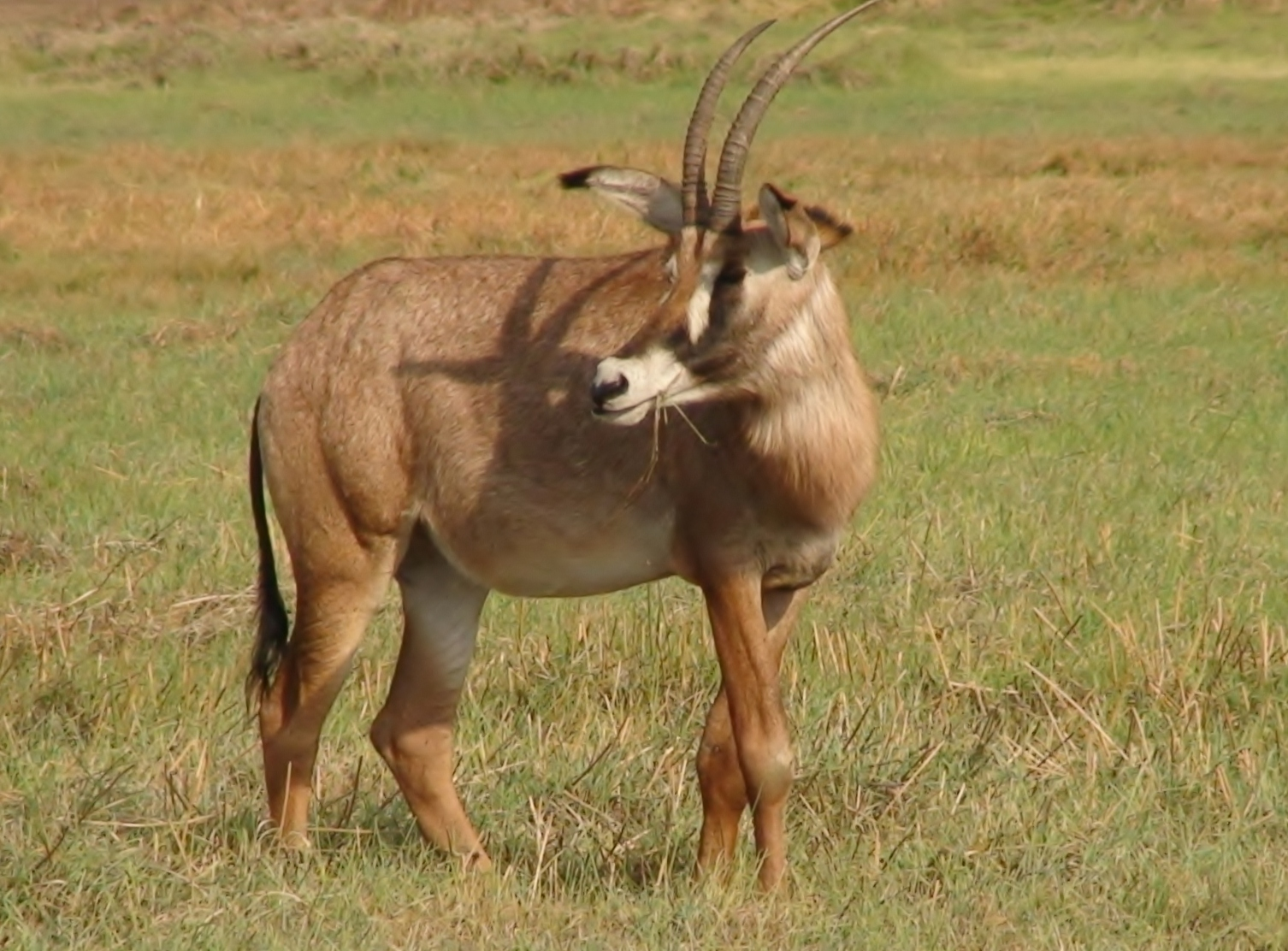
Roan antelope in Kafue National Park

Kafue National Park hosts 21 species of antelope. This large range of antelope includes puku, sitatunga, blue duiker, yellow-backed duiker, Sharpe's grysbok, oribi, impala, roan antelope, sable antelope, blue wildebeest, and Lichtenstein's hartebeest. The Kafue lechwe had been extirpated from the park in the 1960s due to poaching and dam construction, but it was reintroduced in 2025.

With around 4,800 African bush elephant, herds are commonly seen. Other mammals include African buffalo, plains zebra, aardvark, pangolin, bushpig, warthog, spring hare and bush baby.

Since 2005, the protected area has been considered a lion 'conservation unit', together with South Luangwa National Park. There are over 200 lions in the park. The park has the largest cheetah population in Zambia and a healthy population of African leopards. The park is a stronghold of the African wild dog. Other carnivores include Selous's mongoose, white-tailed mongoose, marsh mongoose, African civet, honey badger, African clawless otter, spotted-necked otter, serval, caracal and African wild cat.

The Kafue River and its tributaries are home to pods of hippopotamus and a few of the largest Nile crocodiles in southern Africa. There are also monitor lizards in the park.

=== Birds ===
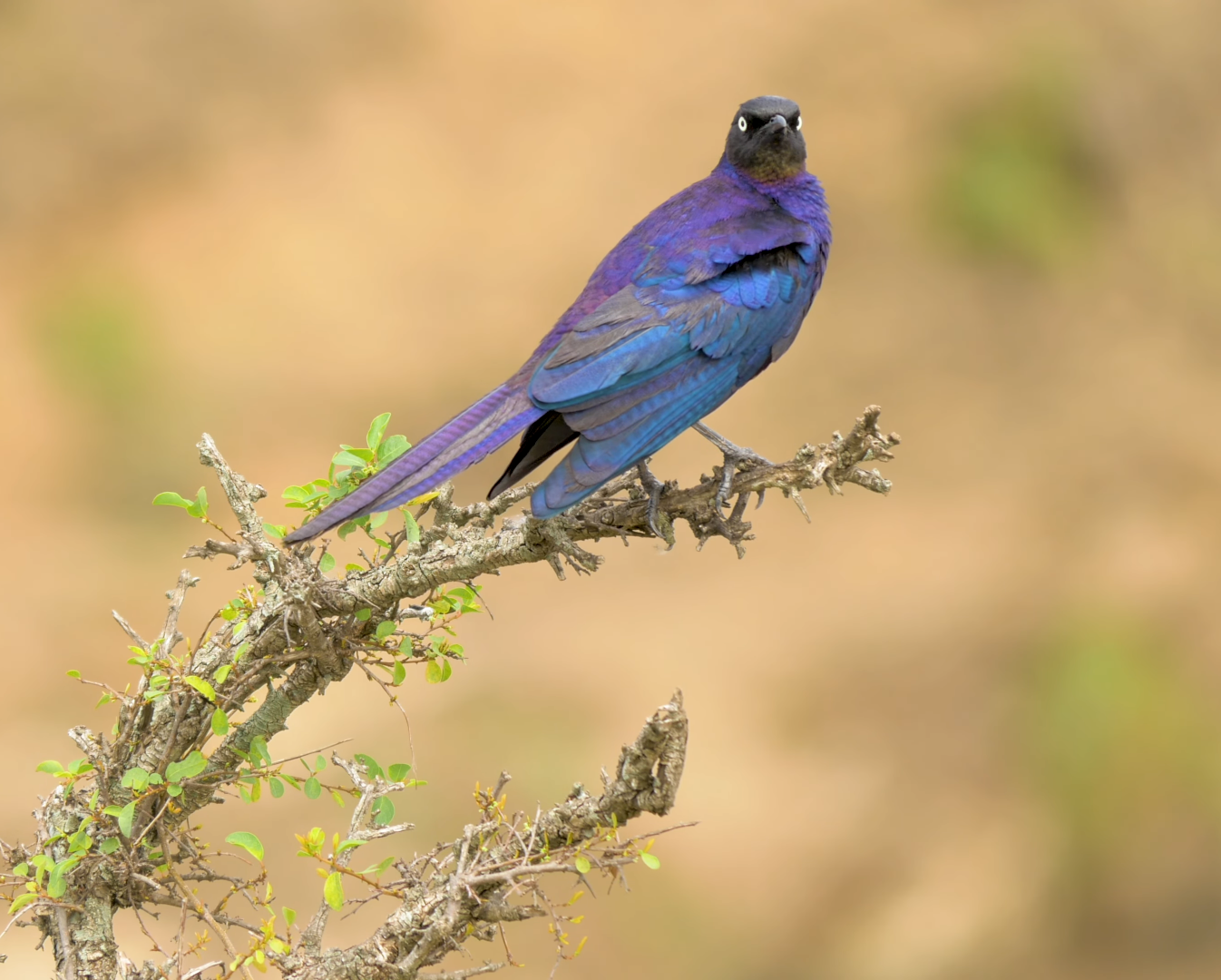
Bird in the Park

Kafue National Park is designated an Important Bird Area by BirdLife International. There are over 500 recorded bird species. The Chaplin's barbet, Zambia's only endemic bird, is rated as vulnerable by the IUCN. More birds include Pel's fishing owl, the black-cheeked lovebird, the African finfoot, Böhm's bee-eaters, paradise flycatchers, and sunbirds, and numerous kingfisher species.

The Busanga swamps are home to a variety of waterbirds. It is one of the few known breeding sites for wattled cranes. The endangered Grey crowned crane is also in the park. Additionally there are flocks of pelicans, many species of egrets and large gatherings of African openbill storks. Colonies of African skimmers are found on sandbars in the main rivers.

The small termite mounds of the grasslands attract sooty chats, and wetter areas of the plains are favoured by the rosy-throated longclaw. When the termite alates fly before the rains, pallid harriers, Montagu's harriers, lesser kestrels and European hobby feast on them. The woodlands are home to African hawk-eagles, black-chested snake-eagles, racket-tailed rollers, flocks of helmetshrikes, and sooty and Arnot's chats.

=== Fish ===
Commercially important fish species in the area are Sarotherodon macrochir, Tilapia andersonii, Coptodon rendalli, T. sparrmanii, Clarias gariepinus, Marcusenius macrolepidotus, Labeo molybdinus and Hepsetus odoe. In 1992, kapenta (Limnothrissa miodon) from Lake Tanganyika were introduced into Lake Itezhi-tezhi.

== Infrastructure ==
Ngoma in the south is the headquarters of the park, but this area, together with the Nanzhila Plains, is less visited since the Itezhi-Tezhi Dam was built and more lodges were developed in the north. The reservoir cut the north–south track through the park and used to make it necessary to detour outside the park to drive between Ngoma and Chunga. The completion of the spine road once again links the north and south of the park.

== Conservation ==
Kafue National Park receives extra protection because it is buffered by nine Game Management Areas. Still, poaching and the demand for bushmeat has led to decline in animal numbers. In 2018, a team of six NGOs worked together to prevent declines due to poaching and habitat degradation. African Parks joined the coalition in 2021, working with the Zambia Wildlife Authority. The Priority Support Plan with African Parks and the government led to the creation of over 200 jobs, improved protection measures, and infrastructure investments. Some of the infrastructure improvements were a new law enforcement centre, fixing existing infrastructure at Chunga and Ngoma, and grading roads. In 2021, investment for law enforcement was double the average for 2018–2020.

== See also ==
- Wildlife of Zambia
