= Kafue River =

Kafue
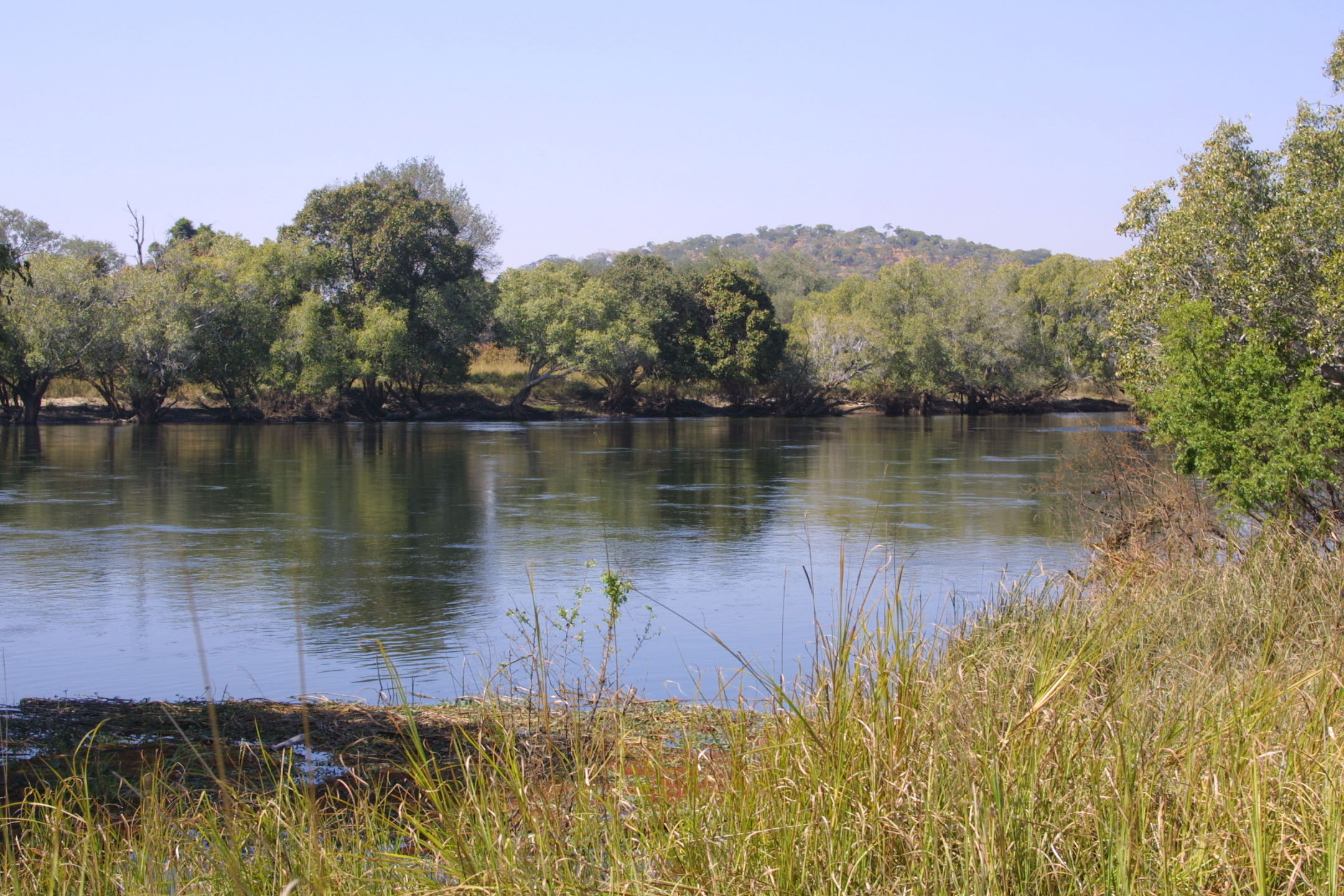
- Kafue River, Chamufumbu, near Lubungu Pontoon, Zambia

- The Kafue River Basin

Location
- Country: Zambia
- City: Kitwe, Mazabuka, Kafue Town

Physical characteristics
- Source
  - location: Zambian border with the Democratic Republic of Congo northwest of Kipushi, North-Western Province, Zambia
  - coordinates: 11°36′S 27°12′E
  - elevation: 1,350 m (4,430 ft)
- Mouth: Zambezi
  - location: near Chirundu, Southern Province, Zambia
  - coordinates: 15°56′34″S 28°54′51″E
  - elevation: 410 m (1,350 ft)
- Length: 1,576 km (979 mi)
- Basin size: 155,000 km^{2} (60,000 sq mi)
- Discharge
  - average: 320 m^{3}/s (11,000 cu ft/s)

Basin features
- River system: Zambezi

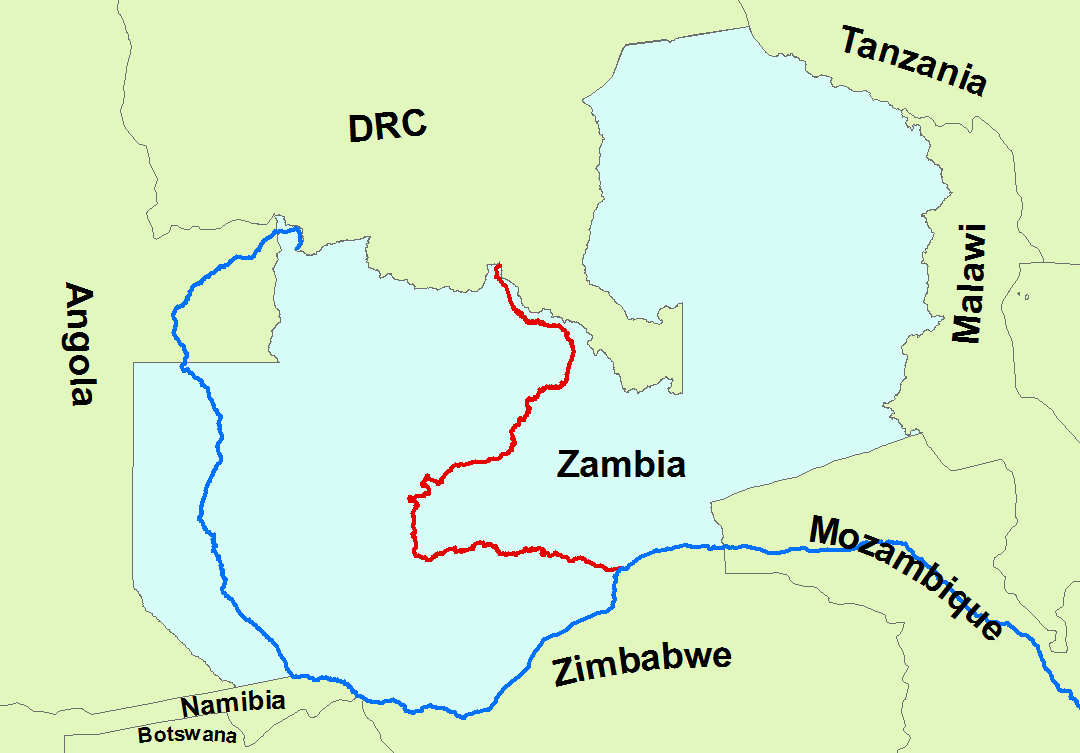
The Kafue River (red) and part of the Zambezi River (blue)

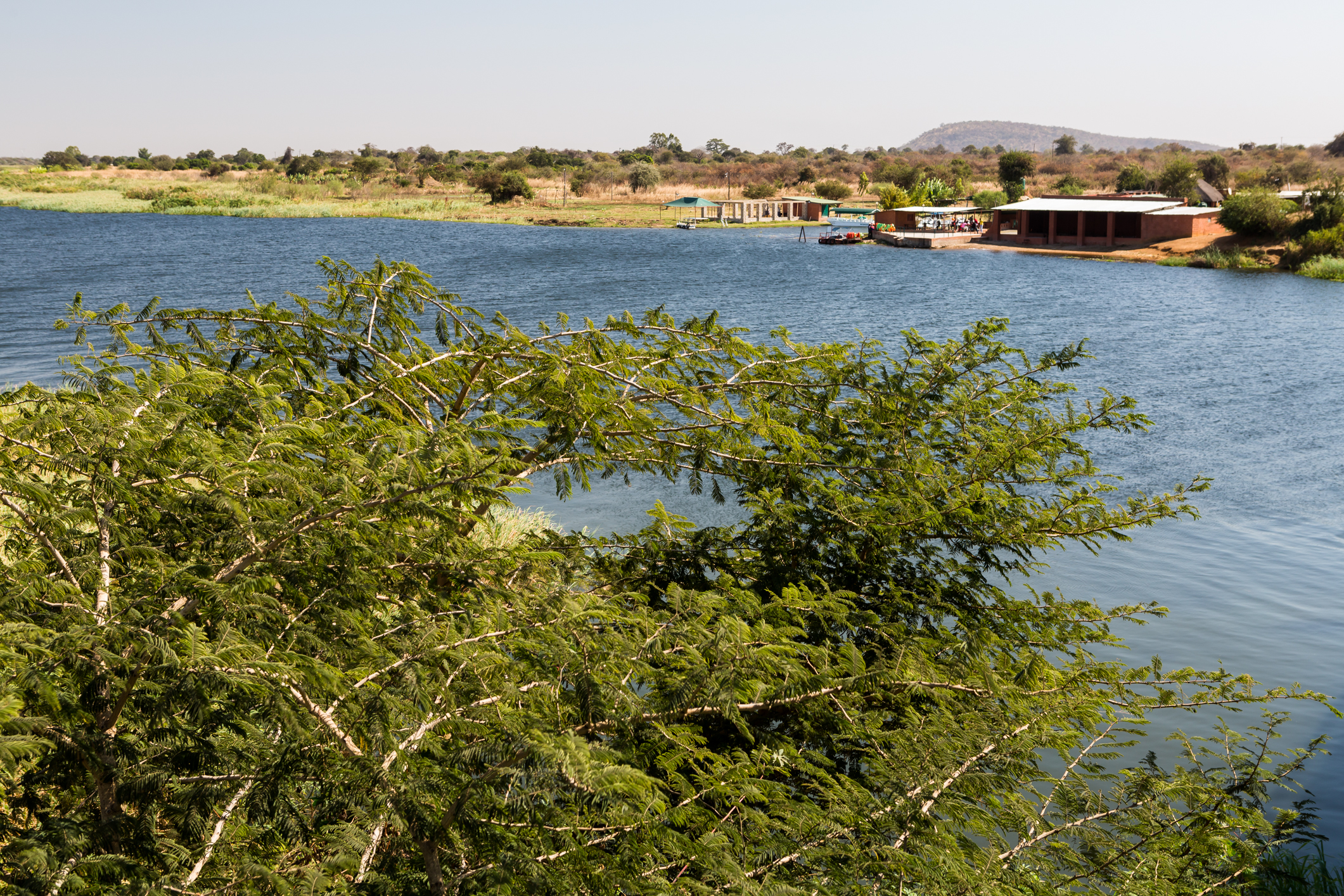
Kafue river from the Kafue bridge

The 1,576 kilometres (979 mi) long Kafue River is the longest river lying wholly within Zambia. Its water is used for irrigation and for generating hydroelectric power. It is the largest tributary of the Zambezi, and of Zambia's principal rivers, it is the most central and the most urban. More than 50% of Zambia's population live in the Kafue River Basin and of these around 65% are urban.

It has a mean flow rate of 320 cubic metres per second (11,000 cu ft/s) through its lower half, with high seasonal variations. The river discharges 10 cubic kilometres (2.4 cu mi) per year into the Zambezi River.

== Course ==
=== Sources ===
The Kafue River rises at an elevation of 1,350 metres (4,430 ft) on the relatively flat plateau just south the border between Zambia and the Democratic Republic of the Congo 120 kilometres (75 mi) north-west of Chingola in the Copperbelt Province. The source of the Kafue River is in the North-western Province of Zambia. The area is Miombo woodland on the Congo-Zambezi watershed, with many branching dambos lying 10 to 20 metres (33 to 66 ft) lower than the highest ground, producing a very gently undulating topography. The river starts as a trickle from the marshy dambos (the Munyanshi Swamp is a tributary) and with little slope to speed up river flow, it meanders south-eastwards sluggishly and within 50 kilometres (31 mi) has the character of a mature river. The area receives about 1,200 millimetres (47 in) of rain in the rainy season, and the river's channel soon reaches 100 metres (330 ft) wide with a floodplain of fluvial dambos 1 to 2 kilometres (0.62 to 1.24 mi) wide.

=== Copperbelt ===
Before the river reaches the Copperbelt towns, however, it loses its wide floodplain, the channel narrows to 30–40 m and it meanders less, in a shallow valley only 40 m or so lower than the surrounding plateau. It flows close to the Copperbelt towns of Chililabombwe, Chingola and Mufulira, and through the outskirts of Kitwe. The popular picnic spot the Hippo Pool north of Chingola is protected as a national monument.

In the Copperbelt, water is taken from the river to irrigate small farms and market gardens. At Kitwe it changes course to the south-west and flows through forest and areas of flat rock over which it floods in the wet season, keeping to a channel about 50 m wide in the dry season.

=== Lukanga Swamp ===
The river again develops intricate meanders and a maze of channels in a swampy floodplain, with oxbow lakes and lagoons. It flows 20 km west of the permanent part of the Lukanga Swamp which fills a circular depression, and which drains through a channel into the Kafue. The area between the swamp and river is flood plain and when that and surrounding areas are inundated in the rainy season, the combined wetland exceeds 6,000 km^{2}. This is the first of the three main wildlife areas of the river, and the least surveyed and protected.

=== Kafue National Park ===
The character of the river changes again, as it forms a less meandering dry-season channel with sandy banks and islands. Continuing south-west it enters the Kafue National Park, second largest national park in Africa, where it receives its two largest tributaries, the Lunga and Lufupa rivers, also from the north. The Kafue skirts the south-east edge of the Busanga Plain, one of Africa's premier wildlife areas, known for large herds of cape buffalo, zebra and antelope. In the rainy season the Lufupa floods the plain.

=== Itezhi-Tezhi Gap ===
Like the upper Zambezi, Okavango and Cuando rivers, the Kafue used to flow south all the way to Lake Makgadikgadi and on to the Limpopo River, but the land in that area was uplifted. A rift valley formed running due east of where the Kafue National Park is now, and the Kafue river eroded a channel called the Itezhi-Tezhi Gap through a ridge of hills about 100 m high, flowing eastwards. The Itezhi-Tezhi Dam was built in 1977 at the gap and now forms a reservoir 50 km long and up to 10 km wide.

=== Kafue Flats ===
Further east, the river flows sluggishly across a flat plain called the Kafue Flats (formerly Butwa after the Twa people) and for the third time develops intricate meanders in a maze of swampy channels and lagoons. This time however it also has an immense shallow flood plain which no roads or railways cross, 240 kilometres (150 mi) long and about 50 kilometres (31 mi) wide, flooded to a depth of less than a metre in the rainy season (deeper in some lagoons and permanently swampy areas), and drying out to a clayey black soil in the dry season. The Kafue Flats are the third major wildlife area of the river. Tens of thousands of Kafue Lechwe live on the Kafue Flats and are adapted to wading the flooded areas. This area also has one of the greatest variety and concentrations of birds in the world. The Lochinvar and Blue Lagoon National Parks have been established on the flats.

Around Mazabuka as the river gets closer to the town of Kafue, sugar plantations and other large agricultural estates have been established on the fertile black soil and use water from the river in the dry season.

=== Kafue Gorge and Dam ===
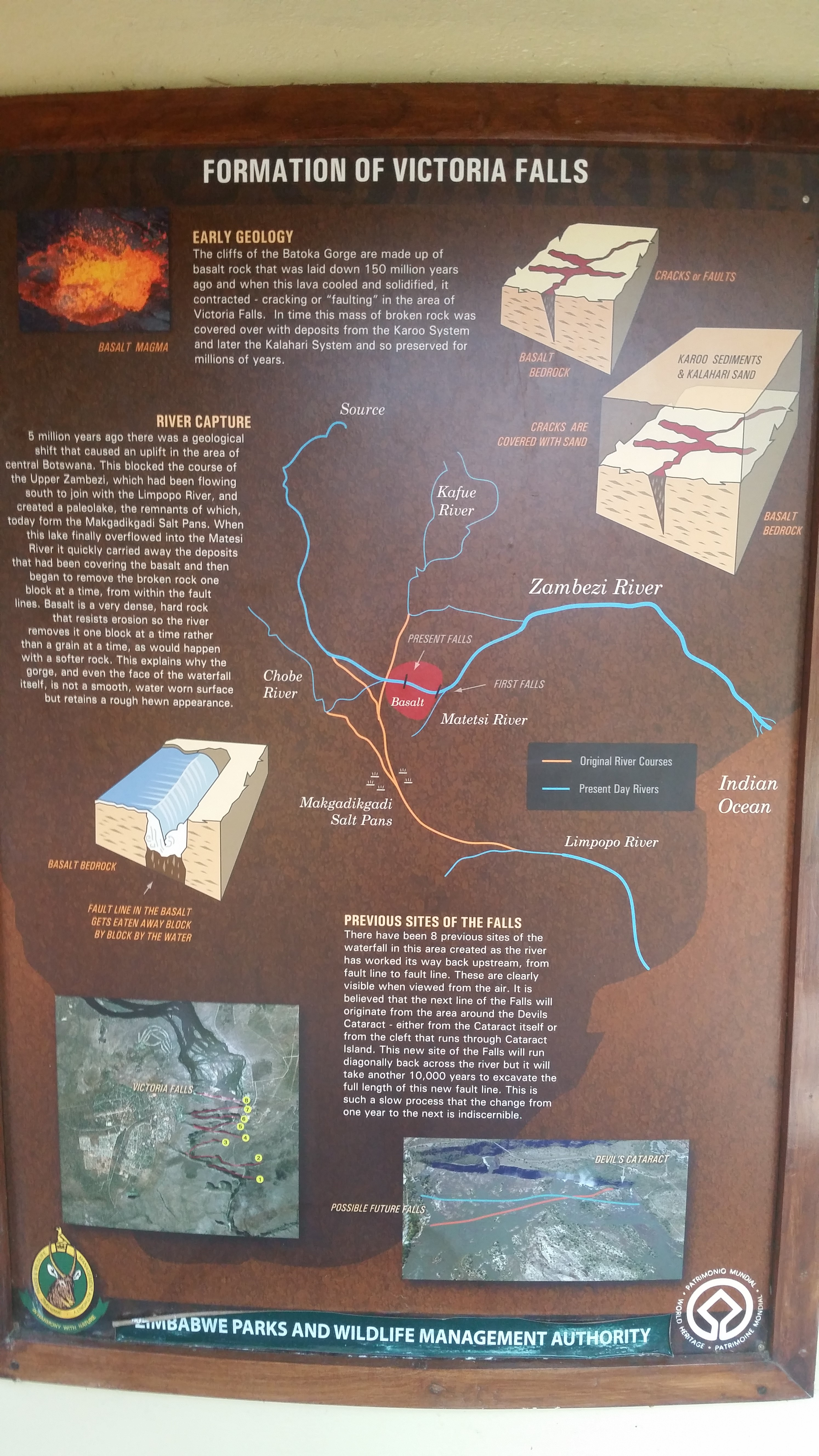
Victoria Falls National Park marker

The Kafue Flats end at Kafue town and from there, as the rift valley gets deeper, the river drops 550 metres (1,800 ft) over 60 kilometres (37 mi) through the Kafue Gorge. A second dam, the Kafue Gorge Dam, with a smaller reservoir, generates electricity. The lower Zambezi (originally a separate river) cut back through the rift valleys and eventually captured the Kafue. Their confluence is about 20 kilometres (12 mi) north of Chirundu.

== Bridges ==
=== Railway ===
See Kafue Railway Bridge for a full account. It was opened in 1906 to connect Kafue with Mazabuka and was originally meant to be part of the Cape to Cairo Railway.

=== Road ===
The first road bridge across the Kafue was originally built across the Thames in London during the Second World War. After the war, it was dismantled and installed some 9 km downstream from the railway bridge. Previously, road traffic crossed the river by pontoon.

The T3 road crosses the river in-between Chililabombwe and Chingola as well as in the city of Kitwe, both in the Copperbelt Province. The T2 road (Cape to Cairo Road) crosses the river 10 km south of the Kafue town centre. The Lusaka–Mongu Road crosses the river at the Kafue Hook Bridge in the Kafue National Park.

== Environmental issues ==
=== Pollution ===
As it flows through the Copperbelt the Kafue River is at great risk of pollution, not just from urban waste but from copper mine tailings. The swampy areas west of the Lukanga Swamp help silt and pollution settle out so that the river becomes clear downstream. A report in April 2002 said: … natural wetlands are quite effective at controlling water pollution from mining in the Copperbelt … Tests show the Kafue to be clean of mining pollutants downstream from the Copperbelt.

In the Kafue flats, the discharge of phosphates in excess fertiliser run-off from commercial farming and the Nakambala Sugar Estate can cause algal blooms and weed growth, reducing fish populations.

Effluent from mining containing cadmium, lead and mercury have degraded the Kafue River Municipal water supply had to be suspended when the Kafue River turned blue due to slurry discharge.

Because of its size and geographic location, the Kafue River basin is an ecosystem that provides services and support to communities and industries that have different and sometimes conflicting interests in usage of the river resources. In 1999, the World Wildlife Fund (WWF) initiated dialogue between the Zambian Government, the Zambia Electricity Supply Corporation (ZESCO) and local people to restore a more natural flow pattern to water releases from the Itezhi-Tezhi Dam built on the Kafue River.

This project heavily influenced development of Zambian Government policy on water resources and in February 2010, the Zambian Cabinet approved a revised National Water policy that "aims to improve water resources management by establishing institutional coordination, engaging in modern methods of integrated water resource management while decentralising government policy to address diverse interests within the water sector".

==== Tailings dam collapse ====
On 18 February 2025, a tailings dam belonging to a copper mine operated by Sino-Metals Leach Zambia collapsed in the Copperbelt Province, causing 50 million liters of waste containing concentrated acid, dissolved solids and heavy metals to enter a tributary of the Kafue River and prompting a shutdown of the water supply in Kitwe.

=== Itezhi-Tezhi and Kafue Gorge Dams ===
These have had major negative environmental effects on the river.

=== Water for irrigation ===
Commercial plantations, especially those bordering the Kafue flats take large quantities of water for irrigation. Chief of these is the Nakambala Sugar Estate, which draws in excess of 720,000 m^{3} per day to irrigate 134.13 square kilometres of land to grow sugar cane.
