= Luambe National Park =

National park in Zambia

- IUCN category II (national park)
- Location within Zambia
- Location: Lumezi District, Eastern Province, Zambia
- Nearest city: Lundazi
- Coordinates: 12°20′S 32°15′E
- Area: 300 km^{2} (120 sq mi)
- Governing body: Zambia Wildlife Authority

Luambe National Park is located in the Eastern Province of Zambia. The park is situated north-east of the famous South Luangwa National Park, and south of the North Luangwa National Park. Like its neighbours, it is located in the Luangwa River rift valley.

The small park (300 km^{2}) lies on the flat valley bottom, next to the river. The ecoregion at the site is Zambezian and Mopane woodlands, a woodland savanna type more tolerant of the hotter drier conditions at the bottom of the valley than the Miombo woodland savanna which covers most of the country. The elevation is 500–700 metres above sea level. In some places the trees are quite dense, in others they give way to grassland.

The life force of the Luangwa Valley is the Luangwa River. In the rainy season it floods and as it recedes, lagoons remain at the side of the main channel. The river does not dry up completely at Luambe but by the end of the dry season flows are reduced to a trickle. The river scene changes through the year according to the water level, which changes the topography of its banks and floodplain. This combination of water and land has created a very special ecosystem. In Luambe, there are numerous lagoons, which are visited by animals and birds in the dry season and which promote biodiversity.

Luambe National Park was unfunded until 1999. As a consequence, excessive poaching led to a drastic decline in wildlife. Only a few shy animals remained. Luangwa-Wilderness e.V., a non-profit association, aims to help with the preservation and rebuilding of the park. This is done in close cooperation with the Zambia Wildlife Authority (ZAWA) and with the involvement of local communities.

Lessons learnt from the neighbouring North Luangwa National Park, through work undertaken by the Frankfurt Zoological Society, illustrated how animal populations can be boosted with appropriate management and planning. In the last three years, the building of a lodge in Luambe National Park has already aided a good recovery and improvement in wildlife numbers.

The overall aim is that the Luambe National Park will be managed by Zambians in the future and will be open to tourism with the sole aim to preserve a unique part of Africa. Longer term, plans exist to establish corridors between the northern and southern parks, as happens in the Great Limpopo Transfrontier Park, consisting of the Limpopo National Park (Mozambique), Kruger National Park (South Africa) and Gonarezhou National Park (Zimbabwe).

== See also ==
- Wildlife of Zambia
