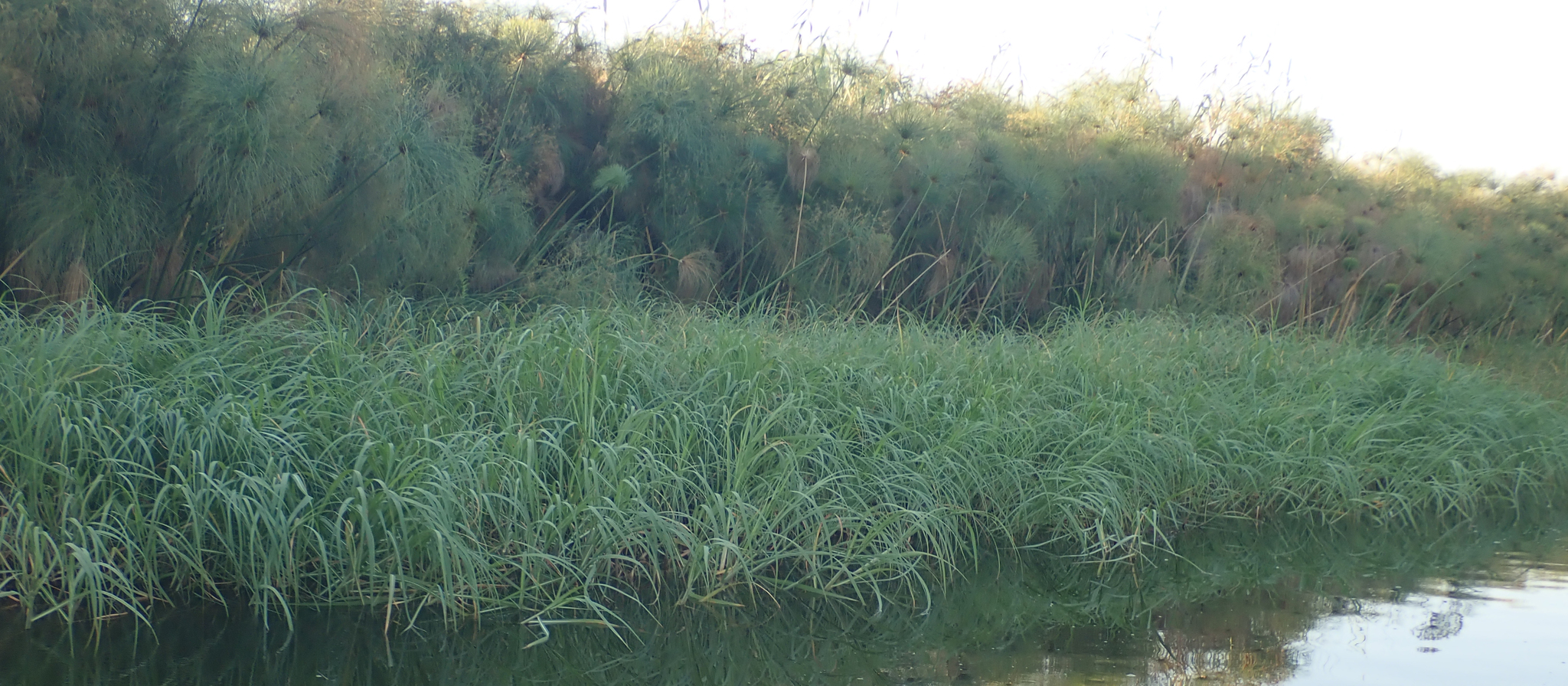

Conservation status
- Least Concern (IUCN 3.1)

Scientific classification
- Kingdom: Plantae
- Clade: Tracheophytes
- Clade: Angiosperms
- Clade: Monocots
- Clade: Commelinids
- Order: Poales
- Family: Poaceae
- Subfamily: Panicoideae
- Supertribe: Andropogonodae
- Tribe: Andropogoneae
- Subtribe: Tripsacinae
- Genus: Vossia; Wall. & Griff. 1836, conserved name not Adans. 17963 (Aizoaceae)
- Species: V. cuspidata

Binomial name
- Vossia cuspidata (Roxb.) Griff.

Synonyms
- Ischaemum cuspidatum Roxb.; Ischaemum ensiforme Buch.-Ham. ex Wall.; Vossia cuspidata var. polystachya Koechlin; Vossia procera Wall. & Griff. (type species of Vossia

= Vossia cuspidata =

Species of grass

Vossia is a monotypic genus in the grass family, found in Asia and Africa. The only known species is Vossia cuspidata, an aquatic grass native to Africa (from Senegal to Egypt, Somalia, south to Namibia), and to Assam, Bangladesh, and northern Indochina. The common name is hippo grass.

== Description ==
It is a thick-stemmed, hairy, perennial, emergent, freshwater aquatic grass that can grow in dense stands in waters up to 5.5 metres in depth. The stems form a spongy mat as the dry season progresses.

== Habitats ==
In the Kafue Flats region of Zambia, it is the dominant plant of eutrophic, slow-moving waters. It forms fairly monocultural stands with few other species, but shares this habitat with the tiny free-floating aquatic carnivorous plant Utricularia gibba subsp. exoleta in sheltered areas where the waters are calm. Hippo grass can also be found here together with other plants in areas where different habitats meet, transitioning briefly with the herb Polygonum senegalense and elsewhere the tall cane Sorghum verticilliflorum along the banks of the main river course, as well as on the floodplains with the similar but annual aquatic grass Echinochloa stagnina and elsewhere with the water-lily Nymphaea lotus.

In this area it is heavily grazed upon by huge herds of Kafue Flats lechwe, an antelope, which are largely dependent upon it in the dry season. This keeps the mat of stems in check, which allows other herbaceous plants to colonise areas of open water, while at the same time freeing up grass seeds caught in the mat. These overgrazed areas thus create the habitat for some of the profusion of birdlife.

When the waters rise as the annual floods in the Kafue Flats commence, upon regular occasion large chucks of Vossia and Echinochloa stems detach, and these slowly dying clumps of grass become wind-blown floating mats in the swamps, which host their own unique ecosystem, dominated by the sedge Pycreus mundii, and further supporting the sedges Cyperus nudicaulis, C. imbricatus and Scirpus cubensis, and the herbs Alternanthera sessilis, Ipomoea mauritiana, I. rubens, Ludwigia stolonifera, L. leptocarpa and a Commelina species.

In Zambia V. cuspidata flowers from January through May, with a peak at the end of March. It does not flower in years of drought on patches of land which do not flood.

Formerly included

see Phacelurus

- Vossia cambogiensis - Phacelurus cambogiensis
- Vossia speciosa - Phacelurus speciosus
