= Lukusuzi National Park =

National park of Zambia

- IUCN category II (national park)
- Location within Zambia
- Location: Zambia
- Nearest city: Chipata
- Coordinates: 13°0′S 32°30′E

Lukusuzi National Park is located in eastern Luangwa Valley in Zambia.

== See also ==
- Wildlife of Zambia
