= Nyika National Park, Zambia =

National park in Zambia

Nyika National Park lies in the northeast of Zambia, on the western edge of the Nyika Plateau, which is one of the highest parts of the country and most of which lies in neighbouring Malawi.

As a consequence of the colonial era when both countries were administered by Britain, a cross-border reserve was established on the plateau. After independence it was divided into the large Nyika National Park (Malawi) and the much smaller Nyika National Park (Zambia). The border between the two parks is the north-south plateau road, which is the only road access, and it starts and finishes in Malawi. Consequently Zambian visitors must enter Malawi to reach it (the nearest Malawian entry points are at Chisenga and Katumbi via the M14).

The Zambian side is undeveloped. There was a colonial-era resthouse, called the Nyika Guesthouse, built around 1946 on the Zambian side of the road, which used to be the only accommodation in either park. After independence, people from Malawi staying there did not have to pass through any border formalities, but paid a "Zambia entrance fee" along with their accommodation bill. It closed in 1998, but can still be seen on Google Maps at 10°34′S 33°42′E. Recent guides to Nyika list campsites and accommmodation in the Malawian National Park only. The Zambia Tourism Investment Guide 2022 released by the Zambia Development Agency lists Nyika 'lodge or entire park' as available as a concession or collaborative management partnership.

Between September and April, a wide variety of wildflowers can be seen in the national park. The Nyika Plateau and two smaller highland areas to the north are the only representatives in Zambia of the Southern Rift montane forest-grassland mosaic ecoregion. For other details of the park environment and wildlife, see the Malawian park.

== See also ==
- Wildlife of Zambia
