= Lochinvar National Park =

National Park in Zambia

- IUCN category II (national park)
- Location within Zambia
- Location: Zambia
- Nearest city: Monze
- Coordinates: 15°51′S 27°13′E
- Area: 428 km^{2} (165 sq mi)
- Established: 1972
- Governing body: Zambia Wildlife Authority
- Website: www.zambiatourism.com/destinations/national-parks/lochinvar-national-park

The Lochinvar National Park lies south west of Lusaka in Zambia, on the south side of the Kafue River.

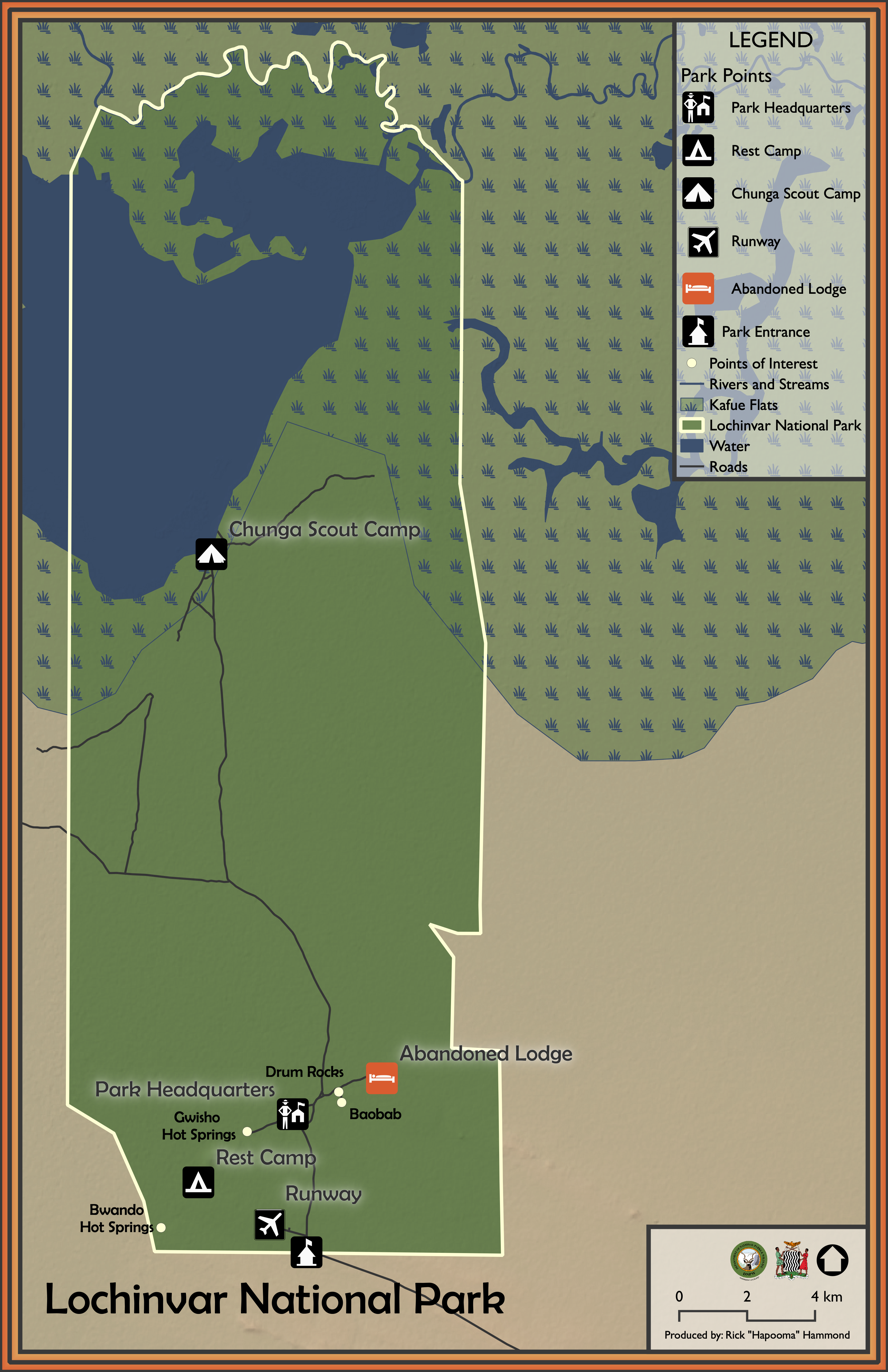
A map of Lochinvar National Park

The habitats the national park protects are a large portion of the southern Kafue Flats floodplain, including the Chunga Lagoon, and drier woodland dominated by termite mounds.

Lochinvar is also home to hot springs, echoing rocks, remains of a Neolithic settlement and an Iron Age village on Sebanzi Hill, also known for its caves, ancient baobab and wildlife.

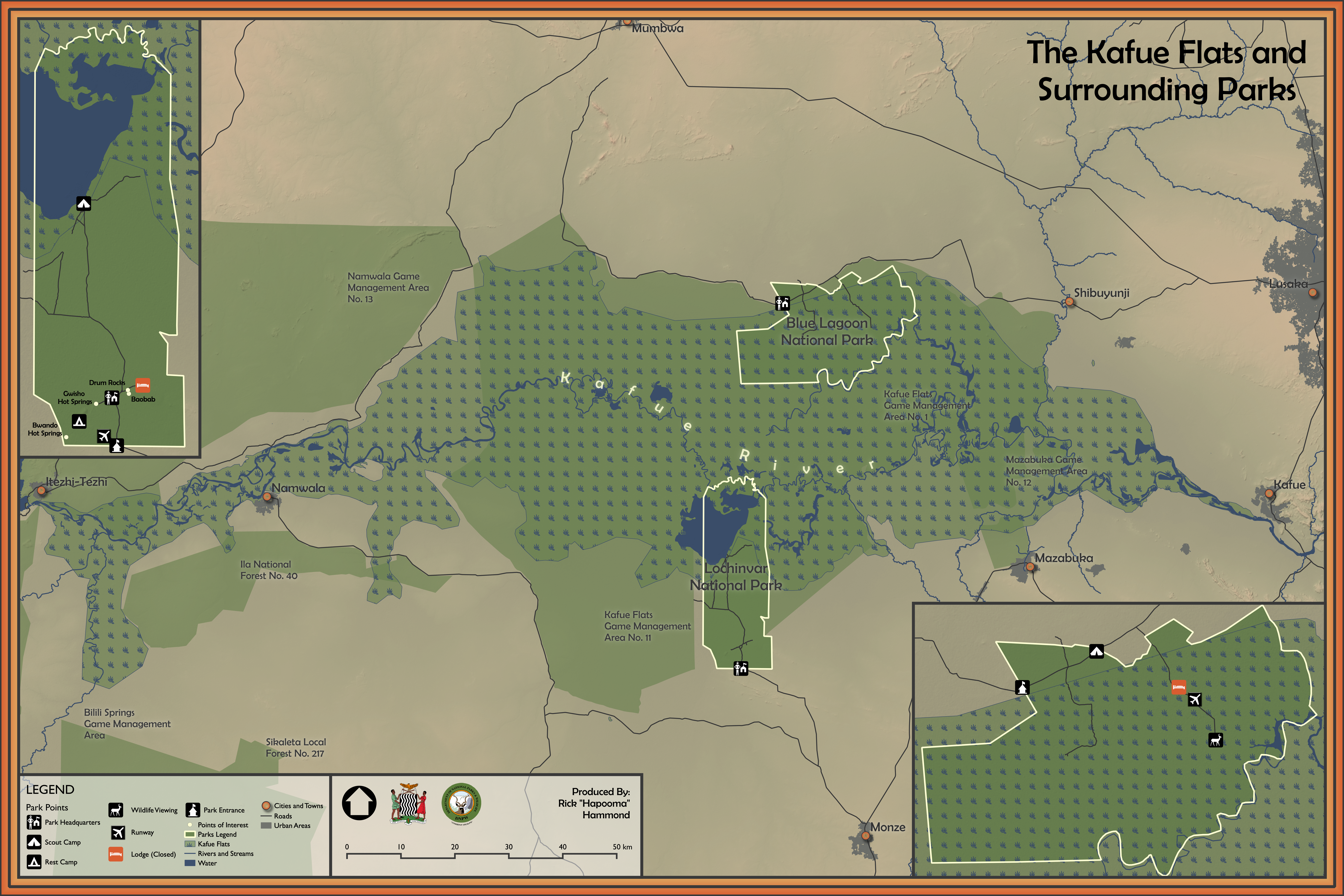
Protected areas of the Kafue Flats

The park's northern boundary is marked by the Kafue River. In the south there are wooded hills. The park's total area is 428 square kilometres.

The park is very similar to Blue Lagoon National Park on the other side of the Kafue on the northern flats.

A former ranch, the park was designated in 1972 and is known for its Kafue lechwe and birdlife, with over 400 species recorded. The other antelopes found here are blue wildebeest, kudu and oribi. The antelope and birds thrive in the absence of larger predators, which have been killed off by ranchers in the area. The southern area of the park, which is a stretch of woodland dominated by Faidherbia albida and Combretum trees, is spared from the flooding that occurs in other parts of the park. This drier area is home to species like the bushbuck, kudu, baboon, bushpig and vervet monkey. The marshes host a large number of waterfowl, including migratory species.

The old colonial-style farmhouse at 15°59′S 27°15′E served as the lodge for the Park but closed many years ago and as of 2026 no accommodiation is available in or near the Park but visitors may camp with their own gear.

The original ranch was named after a loch in Galloway, Scotland.

== See also ==
- Wildlife of Zambia
- Gwisho Hot-Springs
