= Kafue Railway Bridge =

Bridge in Zambia

Coordinates: 15°47′S 28°10′E

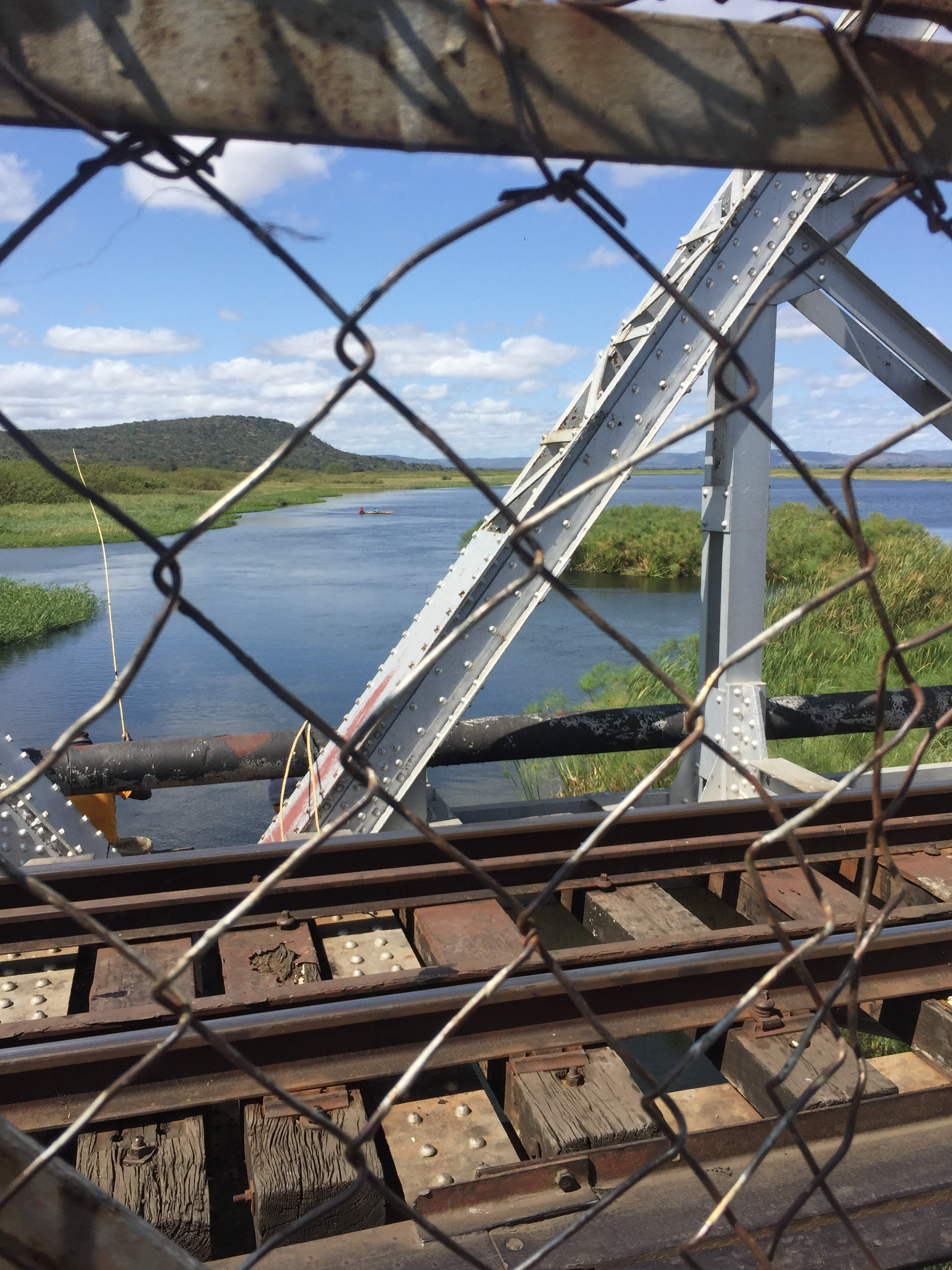
The Kafue Railway Bridge

The Kafue Railway Bridge was built to carry the Livingstone to Lusaka railway line in what is now Zambia over the Kafue River in 1906. It is a steel girder truss bridge of 13 spans each of 33 metres (108 ft) supported on concrete piers. It was built for Mashonaland Railways, later merged into Rhodesian Railways which operated the line from 1927 until succeeded in Zambia by Zambia Railways in 1966.

With a length of 427 metres (1,401 ft) the Kafue Railway Bridge was the longest bridge on the Rhodesian Railways network. It includes nearly 2 kilometres (1.2 mi) of embankments raised about 7 metres (23 ft) where the line crosses the river's wider rainy season channel, and a lower embankment about 15 kilometres (9.3 mi) long where it crosses the river's shallower floodplain to the south-west of the bridge.

The town of Kafue is at the bridge's northern end and the Kafue Bridge on the T2 road is 9 kilometres (5.6 mi) downstream.

== See also ==
- History of Zambia
