= Blue Lagoon National Park =

National Park in Zambia

- IUCN category II (national park)
- Location within Zambia
- Location: Zambia
- Nearest city: Lusaka
- Coordinates: 15°27′S 27°22′E
- Area: 500 km^{2} (190 sq mi)
- Established: 1976
- Governing body: Zambia Wildlife Authority

Blue Lagoon National Park is a small wildlife haven in the northern part of the Kafue Flats in Zambia's Central Province. It covers about 500 km^{2} (190 sq mi) and is very accessible, being about 100 km (60 mi) west of Lusaka (120 km by road).

== Ecology and wildlife ==
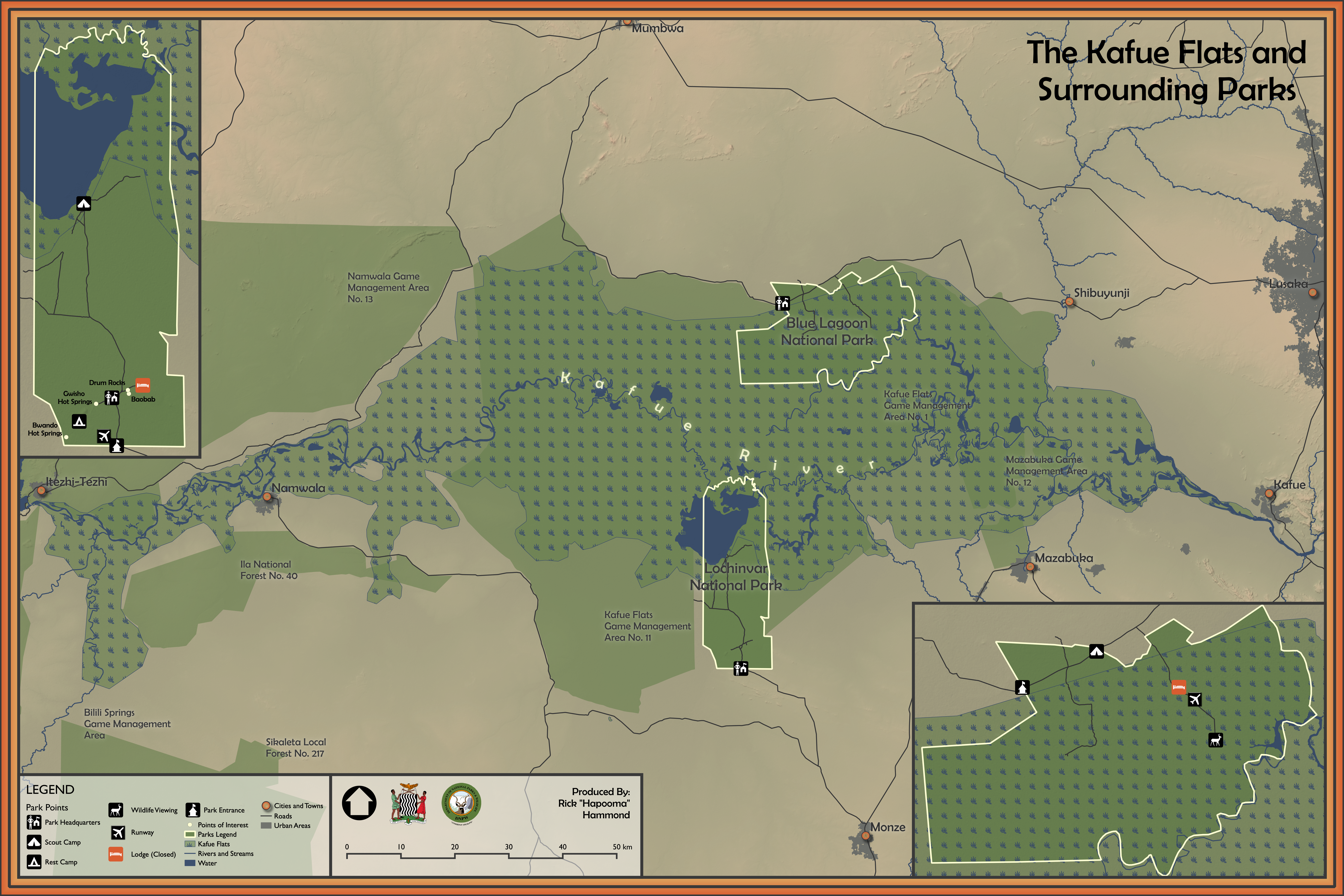
Protected areas of the Kafue Flats

The Kafue River's main channel is about 10 km south of the southern park boundary.

Herds of Kafue Lechwe are seen in the flooded areas, Sitatunga in the swamps and zebra, Reedbuck and buffalo graze the drier parts. A very large number of bird species can be seen there, especially aquatic birds.

It is similar to Lochinvar National Park in the south of the Kafue Flats (but there is no direct road between the two, except via Lusaka).

== Facilities ==
The land was once a farm and the old farmhouse is now the Park reception at 15.453°S 27.457°E. Nakeenda Lodge, four basic self-catering chalets, are available at the same location, and self-camping is also available.

== See also ==
- Wildlife of Zambia
