= Lusaka National Park =

National park in Zambia

- IUCN category II (national park)
- Location within Zambia
- Location: Kafue District, Lusaka Province, Zambia
- Nearest city: Lusaka
- Coordinates: 15°30′S 28°23′E
- Area: 67.15 km^{2} (25.93 sq mi)
- Established: 2011
- Governing body: Zambia Wildlife Authority

Lusaka National Park is Zambia's smallest national park located on the south-eastern edge of the city of Lusaka and easily accessible for short daytime visits. It is Zambia's newest national park, established in 2011 and officially opened in 2015. It is also Zambia's smallest national park at 6,715 hectares. The park was established over an area that was previously forest reserve and is entirely fenced.

There is no accommodation in the park as it is within easy reach of the hotels in the city. However there is a campsite.

It is located south of and adjacent to the Lusaka South Multi-Facility Economic Zone in Kafue District. Before 2010, the national park and economic zone were together known as the Lusaka South Local Forest.
