= Kafue Gorge Upper Power Station =

Zambian power station

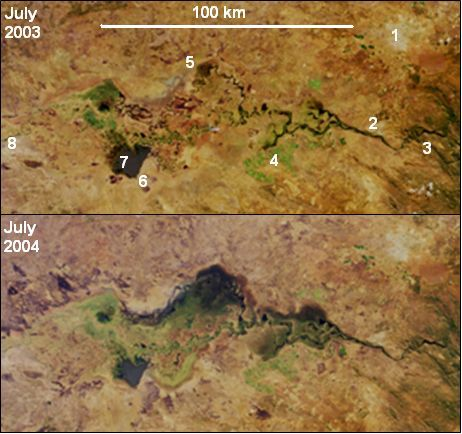

- Map of Zambia showing the location of Kafue Gorge Upper Power Station.
- Country: Zambia
- Location: Kafue Gorge, Chikankata District
- Coordinates: 15°48′25″S 28°25′16″E
- Purpose: Power
- Status: Operational
- Opening date: 1973
- Owner: Government of Zambia
- Operator: ZESCO

Dam and spillways
- Impounds: Kafue River

Power Station
- Turbines: 6 x 150 MW
- Installed capacity: 900 megawatts (1,200,000 hp)

The Kafue Gorge Upper Power Station (KGU), is an operational 900 megawatts (1,206,920 hp) hydroelectric power plant across the Kafue River in Zambia.

== Location ==
KGU is located on the Kafue River, approximately 95 kilometres (59 mi), by road, south of Lusaka, the capital and largest city in Zambia. This is approximately 75 kilometres (47 mi) upstream of where the Kafue River empties into the Zambezi River, and approximately 17 kilometres (11 mi) upstream of the Kafue Gorge Lower Power Station. The geographical coordinates of Kafue Gorge Upper Power Station are:15°48'25.0"S, 28°25'16.0"E (Latitude:-15.806944; Longitude:28.421111).

== Overview ==
KGU is an earth-rockfill dam with a concrete spillway with four radial gates. The electromechanical capacity is six generators of 150 megawatts each, for maximum capacity of 900 megawatts. The reservoir measures 80,940 hectares (312.5 mi^{2}) in surface area. The power generators and electromechanical power house are below ground. The water effluent from the 900-megawatt Kafue Gorge Upper Power Station is used downstream to power the 750-megawatt Kafue Gorge Lower Power Station, in what is known as cascaded generation.

== History ==
Construction of this power station started in 1967. In 1971, the first 150 megawatt turbine was installed and commissioned. Three other turbines were installed and commissioned in 1972. At some point between 1973 and 2009, two more turbines of 150 megawatts each, were installed to bring the generating capacity at the power station to 900 megawatts.

The station currently has an installed capacity of 990 MW with 6 generators of 165-MW capacity each. The power plant has a 330 kV power line output.
