= Kafue Flats =

Wetland in Zambia

Coordinates: 15°38′S 27°04′E

Designations

Ramsar Wetland
- Designated: 28 August 1991
- Reference no.: 530

The Kafue Flats (locally called Butwa) are a vast area of swamp, open lagoon and seasonally inundated flood-plain on the Kafue River in the Southern, Central and Lusaka provinces of Zambia. They are a shallow flood plain 240 km (150 mi) long and about 50 km (31 mi) wide, flooded to a depth of less than a meter in the rainy season (deeper in some lagoons and permanently swampy areas), and drying out to a clayey black soil in the dry season.

== Geography ==
The Kafue Flats stretch for approximately 240 km (150 mi) east to west along the Kafue River from below the Itezhi-Tezhi gap, site of the Itezhi-Tezhi Dam, to Kafue town and the start of the Kafue Gorge. At their widest point they are 50 km (31 mi) wide, and their total area is around 6,500 km^{2} (2,500 sq mi). The elevation of the Kafue River falls 40 m (130 ft) along the flats from 1,030 m (3,380 ft) at Itezhi-Tezhi to 990 m (3,250 ft) at Kafue town.

The town of Mazabuka and the Nakambala sugar estate lie on the southeast edge and the small town of Namwala is situated at the southwest edge of the flats.

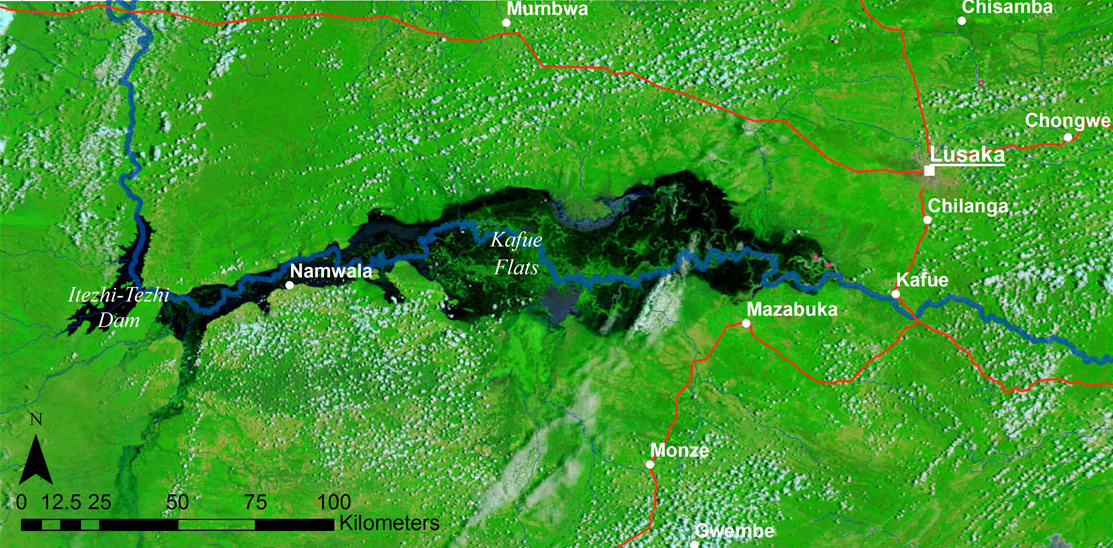
False colour NASA MODIS image of the Kafue Flats in flood and the Itezhi-Tezhi dam - 14 February 2008.

The Kafue Flats fall within parts of the Itezhi-Tezhi and Mumbwa Districts in Central Province, Kafue District in Lusaka Province and Monze, Namwala and Mazabuka districts in Southern Province.

== People ==
The Batwa (or Twa) are thought to have been the first inhabitants of the Kafue Flats area but are now a small minority population settled on higher ground around the Kafue River channel where they support themselves through fishing. The Batwa are generally considered to be the surviving remnants of nomadic Bushmen who inhabited Zambia long before the Bantu peoples began to arrive from the Congo Basin to the north.

The area is now dominated by Ila and Balundwe (or Lundwe, or Plateau Tonga) farmers and cattle herders, in at least 21 chieftaincies, who came to the area between 200 and 300 years ago. They depended on farming, fishing, cattle rearing and wildlife, often moving between a fixed settlement in the woodlands and cattle camps in the flats after the floods have receded. In addition to the settled community there is also a seasonal influx of fishing communities from other parts of the country. These immigrants are mostly Bemba from the north of the country and the Copperbelt area, and Lozi from the Western Province.

The population has increased significantly since the 1970s and by 2004 there were at least 11 major permanent fishing camps on the flats each of which was occupied by at least 500 fishermen. In addition, there were a large number of temporary fishing camps established during the dry season.

In some cases, the Batwa are marginalised from other ethnic groups, particularly the Bemba and the Lozi fishermen who consider them inferior. By contrast the Ila are held in high regard by other groups due to their history of being one of the richest cattle-owning groups in the region, although fishing and hunting plays an equally significant role in their culture.

== Hydrology and dams ==
The hydrology of the Kafue River and Kafue Flats have been significantly altered by the construction in the 1970s of two dams, firstly at Kafue Gorge downstream of the flats and then at Itezhi-Tezhi upstream of the flats as parts of a scheme to generate hydroelectric power.

The Kafue Gorge Dam, with 600MW of hydroelectric power generation, was completed in 1972 creating a reservoir downstream of the Kafue Flats with a storage capacity of 785 million m^{3}. To enable more power generation (up to 900 MW) another 65m high dam at Itezhi-Tezhi, upstream of the Kafue Flats, was completed in 1976. The reservoir stores 5,700 million m^{3} of water and covers a 370 km^{2} (140 sq mi) area of the Kafue River and its tributary the Musa River.

The Itezhi-Tezhi Dam stores water during the wet season which is then released for the turbines at the Kafue Gorge Dam and power station during the dry season. Water takes approximately eight weeks to travel between Itezhi-tezhi and Kafue Gorge.

Prior to construction of the dam at Itezhi-Tezhi, flooding of the Kafue Flats was the result of high flows within the Kafue River beginning to rise following the onset of the rains in November to December and with the peak flood occurring sometime between April and May. The flats would subsequently slowly drain with very little surface water remaining by October to November the following year.

Releases from Itezhi-Tezhi dam are very different to the historical flows experienced within the Kafue River with the smooth annual rise and fall in discharge being replaced by sudden increases as large volumes of water are released from the dam. A substantial discharge is now maintained throughout the dry season whereas naturally this period is associated with lower river flows. Although maximum floods may have been reduced as a result of the dam, the almost year-round releases means that parts of the flats, for instance Chunga Lagoon, now remain permanently flooded. In addition, the Kafue Gorge Dam has created a large reservoir which back up into the eastern end of the flats leading to areas of permanent inundation.

== Protected areas ==
The Kafue Flats include two national parks (IUCN Category II protected areas), the Lochinvar and Blue Lagoon National Parks. Both parks were established in the 1970s on land formerly used for cattle ranching. The 428 km^{2} (165 sq mi) Lochinvar National Park, famous for large numbers of Kafue lechwe, sits south of the Kafue River and is accessible from the Lusaka-Livingstone road at Monze. Lochinvar National Park has one of the highest numbers of vulnerable wattled crane in Africa.

Blue Lagoon National Park, north of the Kafue, can be accessed from the Lusaka-Mongu road west of Lusaka. The 500 km^{2} (190 sq mi) park is home to a large abundance and variety of waterbirds as well as lechwe, sitatunga, zebra and African buffalo.

6,000 square kilometres (2,300 sq mi) of the Kafue Flats outside of the two national parks are covered by the Kafue Flats Game Management Area (GMA)(IUCN Category VI protected area). The GMA affords protection to the environment and wildlife whilst still allowing for the sustainable use of natural resources.

The Kafue Flats were entered onto the Ramsar list of Wetlands of International Importance in 1991 covering an area of 6,000 km^{2} (2,300 sq mi) coincident with the Kafue Flats GMA.

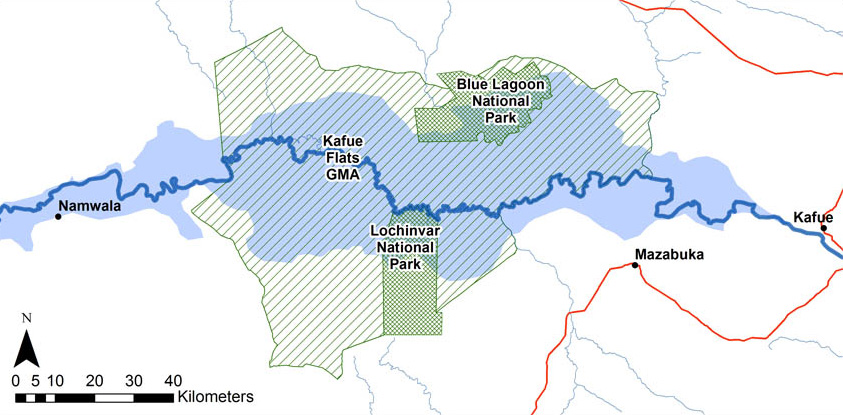
The Kafue Flats, Blue Lagoon National Park, Lochinvar National Park and Kafue Flats Game Management Area (GMA).

== Agriculture ==
The land around the Kafue Flats are an important agricultural area in Zambia. As well as supporting a large number of subsistence and small-scale farmers, the flats are also a source of irrigation water for three large commercial farming operations concentrated around the eastern end of the flats.

The oldest commercial farming operation on the Kafue Flats is the Nakambala Sugar Estate located on the southern edge of the flats at Mazabuka. The Nakambala estate, owned by Zambia Sugar Plc a subsidiary of South African company Illovo Sugar, along with outgrowers and smallholder farmers is the largest sugar producer in Zambia and operated on approximately 20,000 hectares of irrigated farmland.

North of the Kafue Flats, Consolidated Farming Ltd., a Zambian company, produces sugar under the Kafue Sugar brand from a 9,000-hectare estate pumping water from the Kafue Flats. To the east of Consolidated Farming, the Chiansi irrigation scheme grows wheat and other irrigated crops on 200 hectares with plans to expand to 2,500 hectares.

== Ecology ==
The Kafue Flats consists of a complex pattern of floodplain, lagoons, ox-bow lakes, abandoning river channels, marshes and levees surrounded by grasslands and woodlands.

The flats comprise two ecoregions. The central seasonally- and permanently flooded areas are part of the Zambezian flooded grasslands ecoregion, and the surrounding grasslands and woodlands are in the Zambezian and mopane woodlands ecoregion.

The soils of the flats are heavy in texture and tend to crack widely when dry, becoming very sticky and plastic when wet. These soils are mainly black or dark gray and produce an irregular surface relief known as gilgai consisting of a series of small ridges standing 20–60 cm above circular depressions about 2–7 meters in diameter.

=== Vegetation ===
The main vegetation types of the Kafue Flats are woodland (miombo, mopane, Acacia, and Combretum), termitaria grassland, flooded grasslands, permanent swamps and levees and lagoons.

=== Wildlife ===
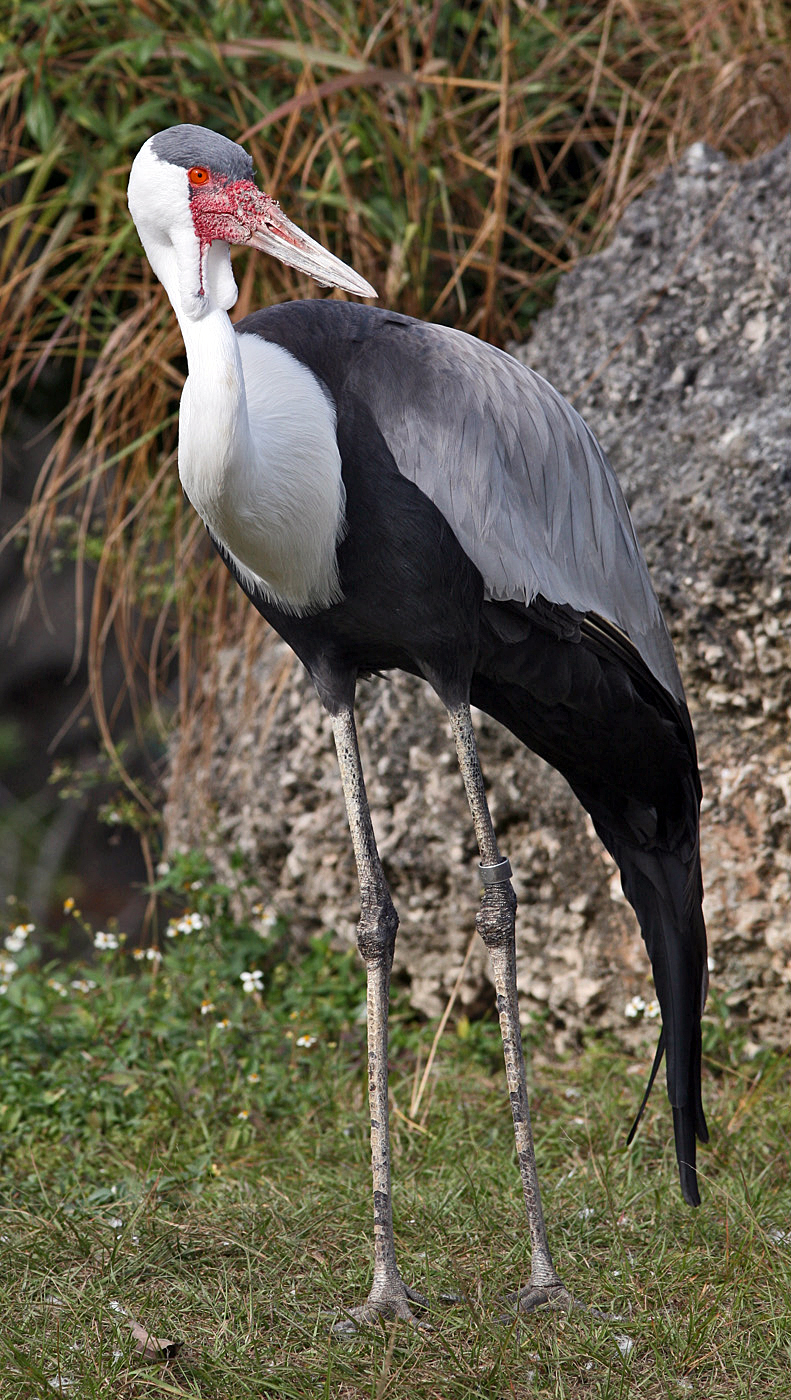
Wattled crane.

The Kafue lechwe (Kobus leche kafuensis), an antelope specialised for living in the marshy conditions of the flats, is endemic to the area. There were estimated to be 250,000 lechwe living on the Kafue Flats in 1931, one of the highest animals carrying capacities in the world at 11,000 kg/km^{2} (63,000 lb/sq mi).

By 2005 the number of lechwe was estimated to have fallen to 38,000, a number which remained mostly stable until the next census completed in 2009. The declining numbers of Kafue lechwe has been attributed to the building of the Itezhi-Tezhi Dam and subsequent change in intensity and timing of flooding as well as illegal poaching and the pressures of rising numbers of people and cattle.

Along with lechwe, Grant's zebras are the dominant species of large mammal that are found in the flats. Blue wildebeest, Cape buffalo, roan, greater kudu, hippo are present in limited numbers particularly in and around the Lochinvar and Blue Lagoon National Parks.

=== Birds ===
The Kafue Flats area supports more than 450 species of threatened, endangered and migratory bird species and the area has been designated an Important Bird and Biodiversity Area (IBA) by Birdlife International. The flats are home to large concentrations of resident and migratory waterbirds including significant breeding colonies deep within the swamps. The flats also host a high diversity and density of breeding raptors particularly vultures.

The flats are an extremely important habitat for the wattled crane (Bugeranus carunculatus) which is listed in the IUCN Red List as vulnerable. Numbers of wattled crane in the flats dropped from between 2000 and 3000 in the 1970s to less than 1000 by 2002. Other important species found on the Kafue Flats include the crowned crane, slaty egret, lappet faced vulture, lesser kestrel and corn crake.

Threats to the bird life of the Kafue Flats include changes to the intensity and timing of floods caused by the dam upstream at Itezhi-Tezhi, the spread of invasive weed species and the impact of increasing human populations.
