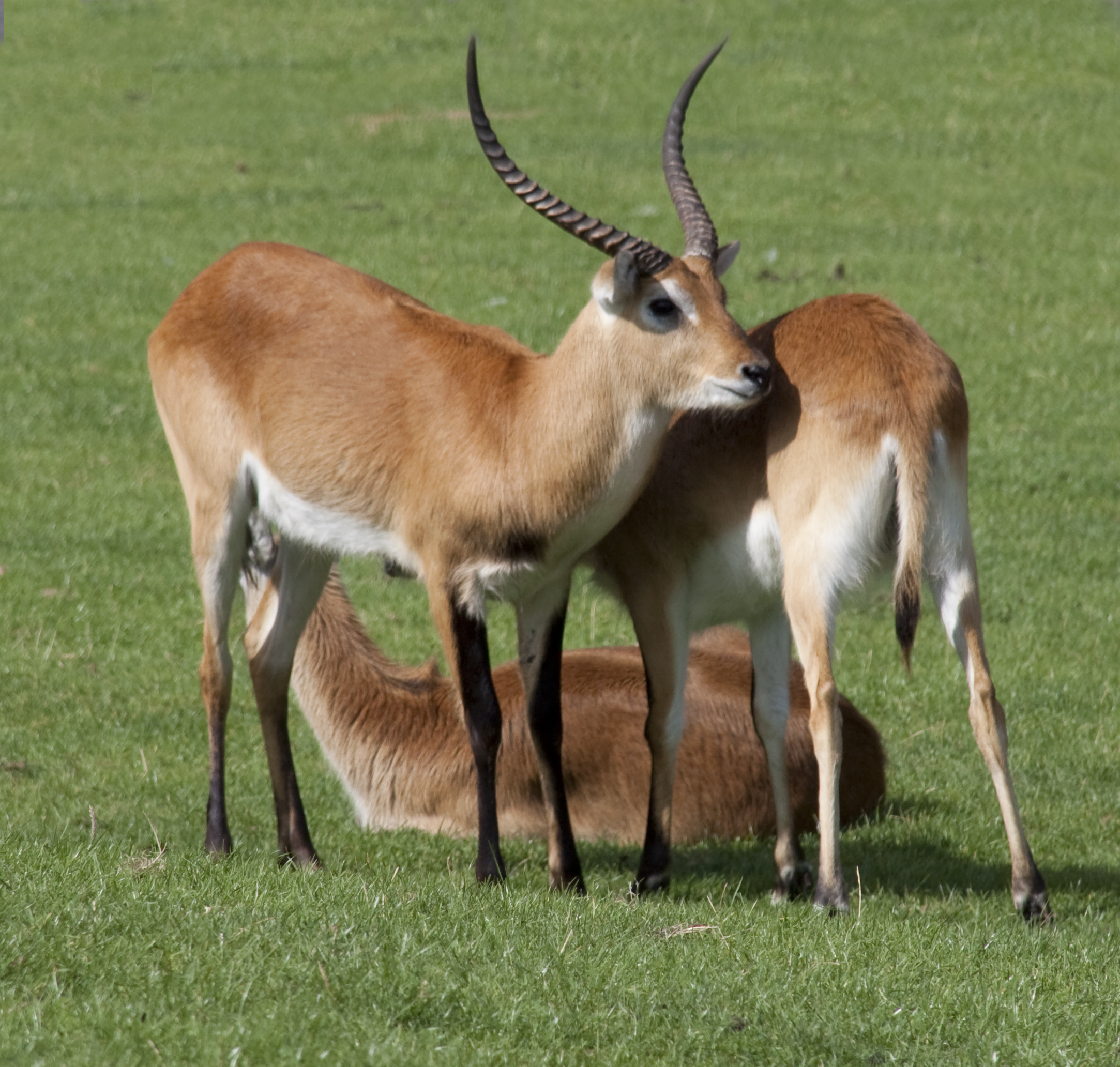
- Kafue lechwes at West Midland Safari Park, England

Conservation status
- Endangered (IUCN 3.1)

Scientific classification
- Kingdom: Animalia
- Phylum: Chordata
- Class: Mammalia
- Order: Artiodactyla
- Family: Bovidae
- Genus: Kobus
- Species: K. leche
- Subspecies: K. l. kafuensis

Trinomial name
- Kobus leche kafuensis (Gray, 1850)

= Kafue lechwe =

Subspecies of lechwe

The Kafue lechwe or Kafue Flats lechwe (Kobus leche kafuensis) is a subspecies of the southern lechwe. It is endemic to the Kafue Flats, Zambia. It is listed on the IUCN Red List as Endangered.
