= Pemba =

Pemba may refer to:

== Places ==
- Pemba Island, Tanzania
- Pemba, Mozambique
- Pemba District, Zambia
  - Pemba, Zambia
  - Pemba (constituency), a constituency of the National Assembly of Zambia

== People ==
- George Pemba (1912–2001), South African painter and writer
- Tsewang Yishey Pemba (1931–2011), Tibetan physician

== Other uses ==
- Pemba (chalk), a chalk used in Afro-Brazilian religions
- Pemba (katydid), a genus of South American bush crickets in the tribe Teleutiini

== See also ==
- Pemba Airport (disambiguation)
