= Namwala (constituency) =

Constituency of the National Assembly of Zambia

Namwala was a constituency of the National Assembly of Zambia. It covered Namwala and surrounding areas in Namwala District of Southern Province.

== List of MPs ==
Election year	MP	Party
Namwala
1964	Edward Liso	Zambian African National Congress
1968	Edward Liso	Zambian African National Congress
1971 (by-election)	Wilfred Shoonji	United National Independence Party
1973	Joseph Mwemba	United National Independence Party
1978	Dennis Zaloumis	United National Independence Party
1983	Biggie Nkumbula	United National Independence Party
1988	Biggie Nkumbula	United National Independence Party
1991	Chulu Kalima	Movement for Multi-Party Democracy
1996	Janet Chikwata	Movement for Multi-Party Democracy
2001	Nkumbula Liebenthal	United Party for National Development
2006	Robby Chizhyuka	United Party for National Development
2011	Moono Lubezhi	United Party for National Development
2016	Moono Lubezhi	United Party for National Development
2021	Herbert Mapani	United Party for National Development
Seat abolished (split into Namwala West and Namwala East)
