= List of museums in Zambia =

This is a list of museums in Zambia.

== List ==
- Choma Museum and Crafts Project
- Chilenje House 394
- Copperbelt Museum
- Livingstone Museum
- Lusaka National Museum
- Moto Moto Museum
- Nayuma Museum
- Railway Museum
- Victoria Falls Field Museum

== See also ==
- List of museums
