= M11 road (Zambia) =

Road in the Southern Province of Zambia

M11 Road

Route information
- Length: 169.1 km (105.1 mi)

Major junctions
- South-east end: T1 in Choma
- North-west end: Namwala

Location
- Country: Zambia
- Provinces: Southern
- Major cities: Choma, Namwala

Highway system
- Transport in Zambia
← M10	→ M12

The M11 road is a road in the Southern Province of Zambia that connects Choma with Namwala. It is the main road connecting Namwala to the rest of the Southern Province. It is approximately 169 kilometres in length.

== Route ==
The M11 begins in Choma (Capital of the Southern Province), at a junction with the T1 road (Lusaka-Livingstone road). It begins by going northwards for 115 kilometres, meeting the D361 from Pemba and the D365 from Monze, to a settlement named Kabulamwanda, where the M11 turns westwards.

From Kabulamwanda, the M11 goes westwards for 52 kilometres to enter the town of Namwala on the southern bank of the Kafue River, where it ends in the town centre.

A road connects further west from Namwala to Ngoma near the Itezhi-Tezhi Dam in the Kafue National Park.

== See also ==
- Roads in Zambia
