= Livingstone District =

Coordinates: 17°40′S 25°50′E

- District
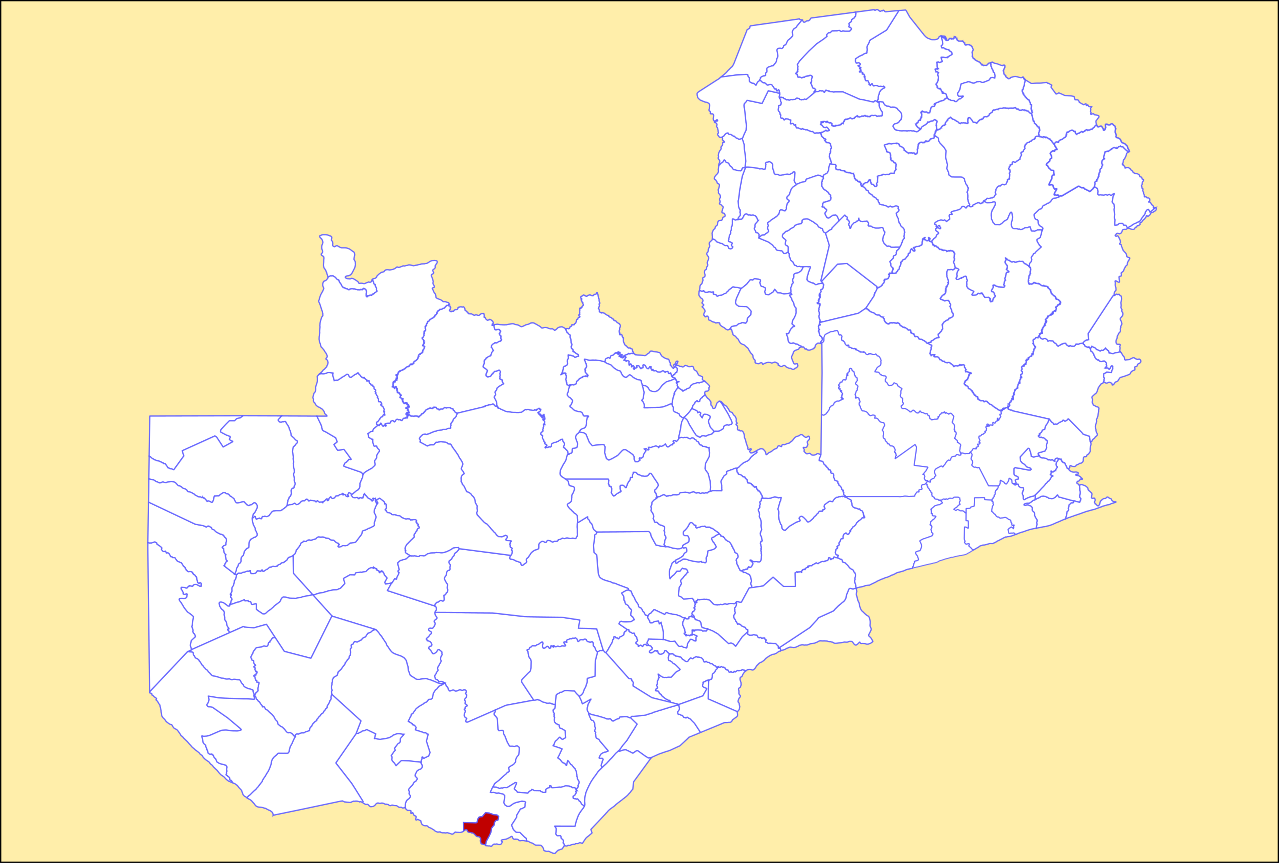
- District location in Zambia
- Country: Zambia
- Province: Southern Province
- Capital: Livingstone

Area
  - Total: 695 km^{2} (268 sq mi)

Population (2022)
  - Total: 177,393
  - Density: 255/km^{2} (661/sq mi)
- Time zone: UTC+2 (CAT)

Livingstone District is a district of Zambia, located in Southern Province. The capital lies at Livingstone. As of the 2022 Zambian Census, the district had a population of 177,393 people. Its border with Zimbabwe is formed by the Zambezi River and Victoria Falls. Although most people live in Livingstone, other villages include Simonga in the west.

== Transportation ==
The Zambia road of M10 from Kazungula and Sesheke in the west, after passing through Simonga, reaches a junction with the T1 road in the city of Livingstone (south of the town centre). The T1 then continues either south to cross over Victoria Falls Bridge into Zimbabwe or north-east towards Zimba, Choma and Lusaka.

Harry Mwanga Nkumbula International Airport serves Livingstone and is connected to the downtown by Libala Drive (often known and labelled as "Airport Road").

== Victoria Falls ==
Africa's largest waterfall, Victoria Falls, is found in the Livingstone District, on the border with Zimbabwe. Located by Mosi-oa-Tunya National Park, the waterfalls cascade past Livingstone Island along the Zambezi River. Then, the river passes underneath Victoria Falls Bridge on the road T1/A8.
