= Mapatizya =

Constituency of the National Assembly of Zambia

Mapatizya is a constituency of the National Assembly of Zambia. It covers Zimba District in Southern Province, including the town of Zimba.

== List of MPs ==
Election year	MP	Party
Mapatizya
1991	Ackson Sejani	Movement for Multi-Party Democracy
1996	Ackson Sejani	Movement for Multi-Party Democracy
2001	Grace Sialumba	United Party for National Development
2006	Ackson Sejani	United Party for National Development
2011	Clive Miyanda	United Party for National Development
2016	Clive Miyanda	United Party for National Development
2021	Emeldah Munashabantu	United Party for National Development
2026	Emeldah Munashabantu	United Party for National Development
