= Kalomo Central =

Constituency of the National Assembly of Zambia

Kalomo Central is a constituency of the National Assembly of Zambia. It covers the town of Kalomo in Kalomo District of Southern Province.

== List of MPs ==
Kalomo
1964	Landson Hantuba	Zambian African National Congress
1968 (by-election)	Mclennan Mpasela	Zambian African National Congress
1968	Robinson Muwezwa	Zambian African National Congress
1973	Nathan Siafwa	United National Independence Party
1978	Nathan Siafwa	United National Independence Party
1983	Nathan Siafwa	United National Independence Party
1988	Redson Kumalo	United National Independence Party
1991	Elias Miyanda	Movement for Multi-Party Democracy
1996	Elias Miyanda	Movement for Multi-Party Democracy
2000 (by-election)	Peter Matubulanai	Movement for Multi-Party Democracy
2001	Request Muntanga	United Party for National Development
Kalomo Central
2006	Request Muntanga	United Party for National Development
2011	Request Muntanga	United Party for National Development
2016	Harry Kamboni	United Party for National Development
2021	Harry Kamboni	United Party for National Development
2026	Harry Kamboni	United Party for National Development
