= Siavonga =

- Town
- Location in Zambia
- Coordinates: 16°32′S 28°43′E
- Country: Zambia
- Province: Southern Province
- District: Siavonga District
- Climate: BSh

Siavonga is a town in the Southern Province of Zambia, lying on the north shore of Lake Kariba. It is Zambia's principal tourism centre for the lake, with accommodation, boating and fishing tours on offer.

== History ==
Tongas, one of the Bantu Botatwe-speaking people, are found in this region. They have settled in this region for many years and are the major tribe living on the shore of Lake Kariba.

The Tonga people of Zambia and Zimbabwe (also called 'Batonga') are a Bantu ethnic group of southern Zambia and neighbouring northern Zimbabwe, and to a lesser extent, of Mozambique. They are related to the Batoka who are part of the Tokaleya people in the same area.

== Mining ==
=== Mutanga Uranium Project ===
31km North of Siavonga and north of Lake Kariba, there are 5 main Uranium Deposits: Mutanga, Dibwe, Dibwe East, Njame, and Gwabe explored under The Mutanga Uranium Project. The Canadian Toronto Stock Exchange (TSX) listed GoviEx acquired 100% of the Mutanga Project in 2016. In March 2022, GoviEx announced that the Project is forecast to start production in 2027 and could be the lowest capital intensive uranium project in Africa.
