= Dundumwezi =

Dundumwenzi
- Village
- Location within Zambia
- Coordinates: 16°42′00″S 26°02′00″E
- Country: Zambia
- Province: Southern Province
- District: Kalomo District
- Time zone: UTC+2 (CAT)

Dundumwezi is a modified word from its original "Dundumwenze" which means a male mountain. It is a settlement in Chief Siachitema's area in the south-west of Kalomo District of Southern Province in Zambia. It is part of Dundumwenzi Constituency. It is an underdeveloped remote area that lacks infrastructure and basic necessities. It lacks roads hospitals, schools and housing.

== Demographics ==
Dundumwezi is inhabited by the Tonga people of Zambia.
