= Lusaka–Livingstone Road =

Road in Zambia

Coordinates: 16°37′24″S 27°19′49″E

Lusaka-Livingstone Road

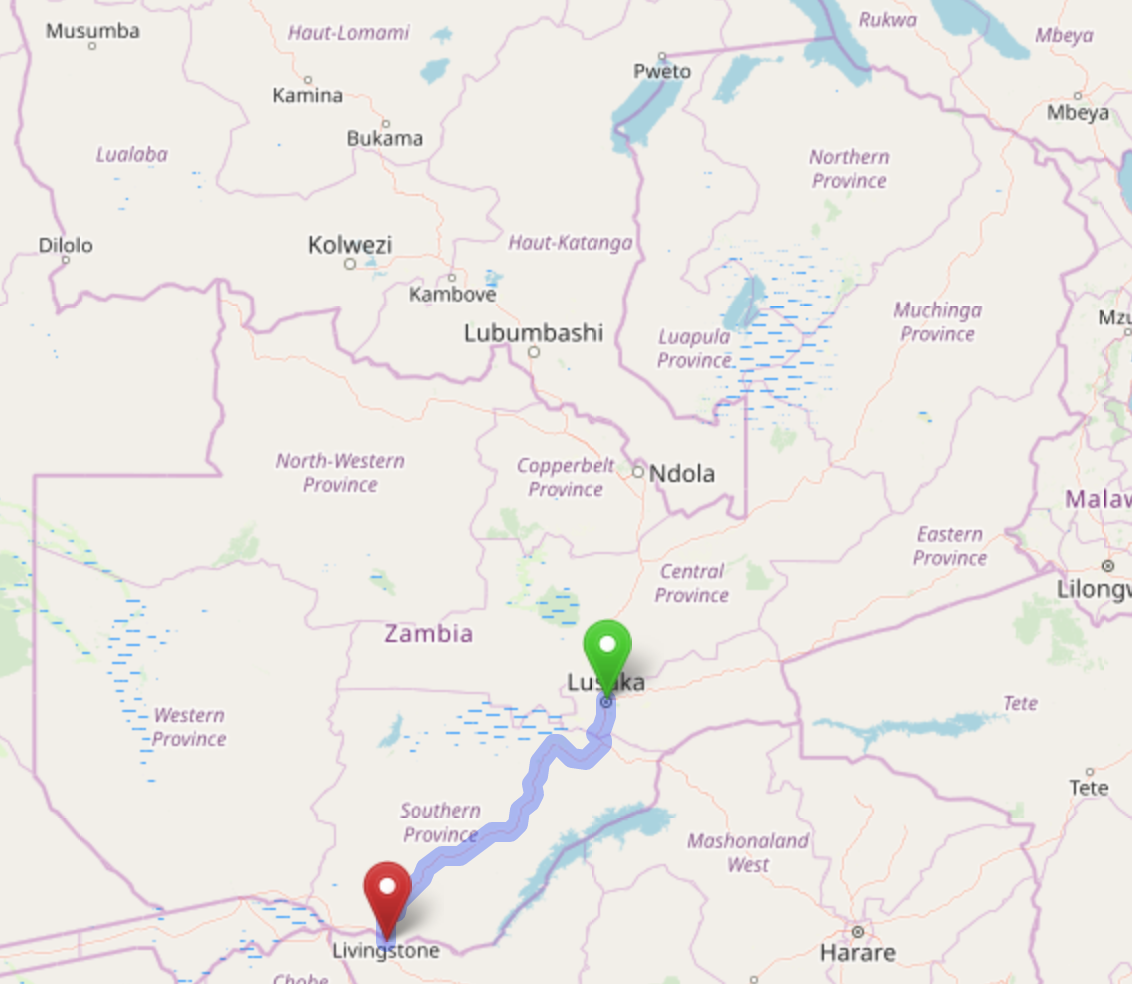
- Map showing the Lusaka-Livingstone Road through Zambia

Route information
- Length: 430 km (270 mi)

Major junctions
- North-east end: T2 south of Kafue
- M11 in Choma; M10 in Livingstone
- South-west end: A8 A8 at the Victoria Falls border with Zimbabwe

Location
- Country: Zambia
- Provinces: Southern

Highway system
- Transport in Zambia
→ T2

The T1 or Lusaka–Livingstone Road is the main highway of the Southern Province of Zambia. It begins 55 kilometres south of the city of Lusaka (10 kilometres south of Kafue) and heads south-west to the principal tourist destination, Victoria Falls in Livingstone, via Mazabuka, Monze, Choma and Kalomo, measuring approximately 430 kilometres (267 mi). The entire route is part of Trans-African Highway network number 4 or Cairo-Cape Town Highway between Cairo and Cape Town.

== Route ==
The total distance of the route is approximately 430 kilometres (267 mi). It is entirely in the Southern Province of Zambia.

The T1 begins in Chikankata District, at the Turnpike junction with the T2 road (Kafue Road) just south of the Kafue River Bridge (55 kilometres south of Lusaka; 10 kilometres south of Kafue) (adjacent to the Kafue Weighbridge).

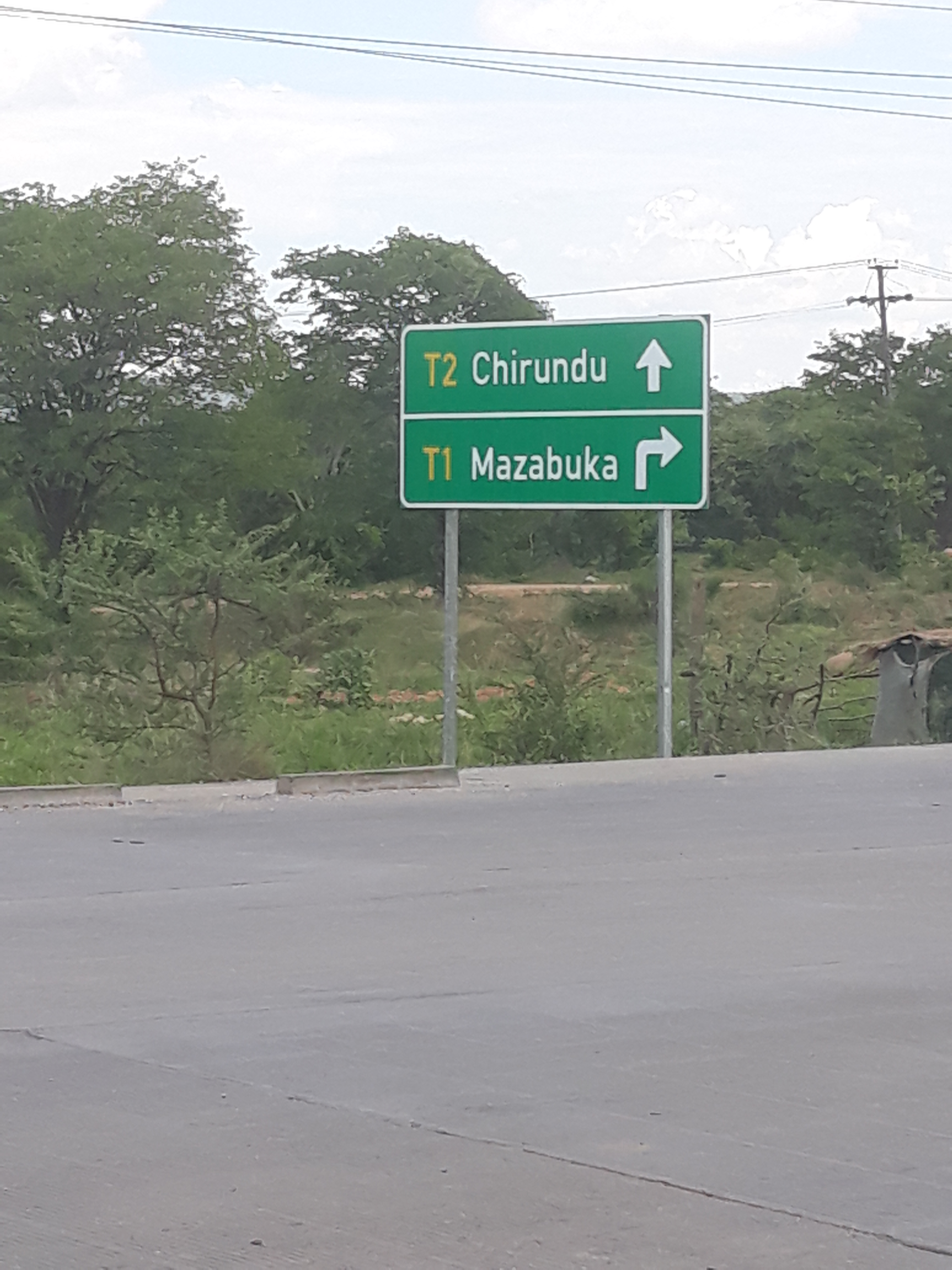
A road sign at the T2 & T1 junction in Chikankata District, Southern Province, Zambia (December 2022)

From the T2 road t-junction, the T1 goes westwards for 68 kilometres (42 mi), meeting the northern terminus of the D387 road (which connects to Chikankata 30 kilometres away), to reach the town of Mazabuka. It enters Mazabuka in a northerly direction. By ABSA Bank, the T1 turns westwards and by Mazabuka Police Station, the T1 turns northwards. It is one road for the remainder of its length to Livingstone.

North of Mazabuka town centre, the road turns west and then south-west. It goes for 60 kilometres (37 mi), through the settlement of Magoye, to the town of Monze. After passing through Monze in a southerly direction, it continues for 35 kilometres (22 mi), through the small town of Chisekesi (where it meets the D375 road going to Gwembe), to the town of Pemba.

From Pemba, the T1 goes south-west for 60 kilometres (37 mi), through the settlement of Batoka (where it meets the D775 road to Sinazongwe by Lake Kariba), through the Daniel Munkombwe Toll Plaza, to the town of Choma, Southern Province's Capital since 2012. In Choma, the T1 meets the southern terminus of the M11 road, which connects Choma with Namwala and the Itezhi-Tezhi Dam.

From Choma, the T1 goes west-south-west for 60 kilometres (37 mi) to the town of Kalomo, which was the first administrative centre of the former North-Western Rhodesia. In Kalomo, the T1 meets a road which heads to the southern part of the Kafue National Park (Dundumwezi Gate).

From Kalomo, the road goes south-west for 50 kilometres (31 mi) to the market town of Zimba. From Zimba, the road continues south-south-west for 80 kilometres (50 mi), through a narrow part of Kazungula District, through the Kebby Musokotwane Toll Plaza, to the city of Livingstone, Zambia's tourist capital, where it enters the city as Lusaka Road before becoming Mosi-oa-Tunya Road in the city centre.

South of the Livingstone city centre, the T1 road meets the eastern terminus of the M10 road, which connects Livingstone with Kazungula (Botswana Border Post), Sesheke (Namibia Border Post) and Mongu.

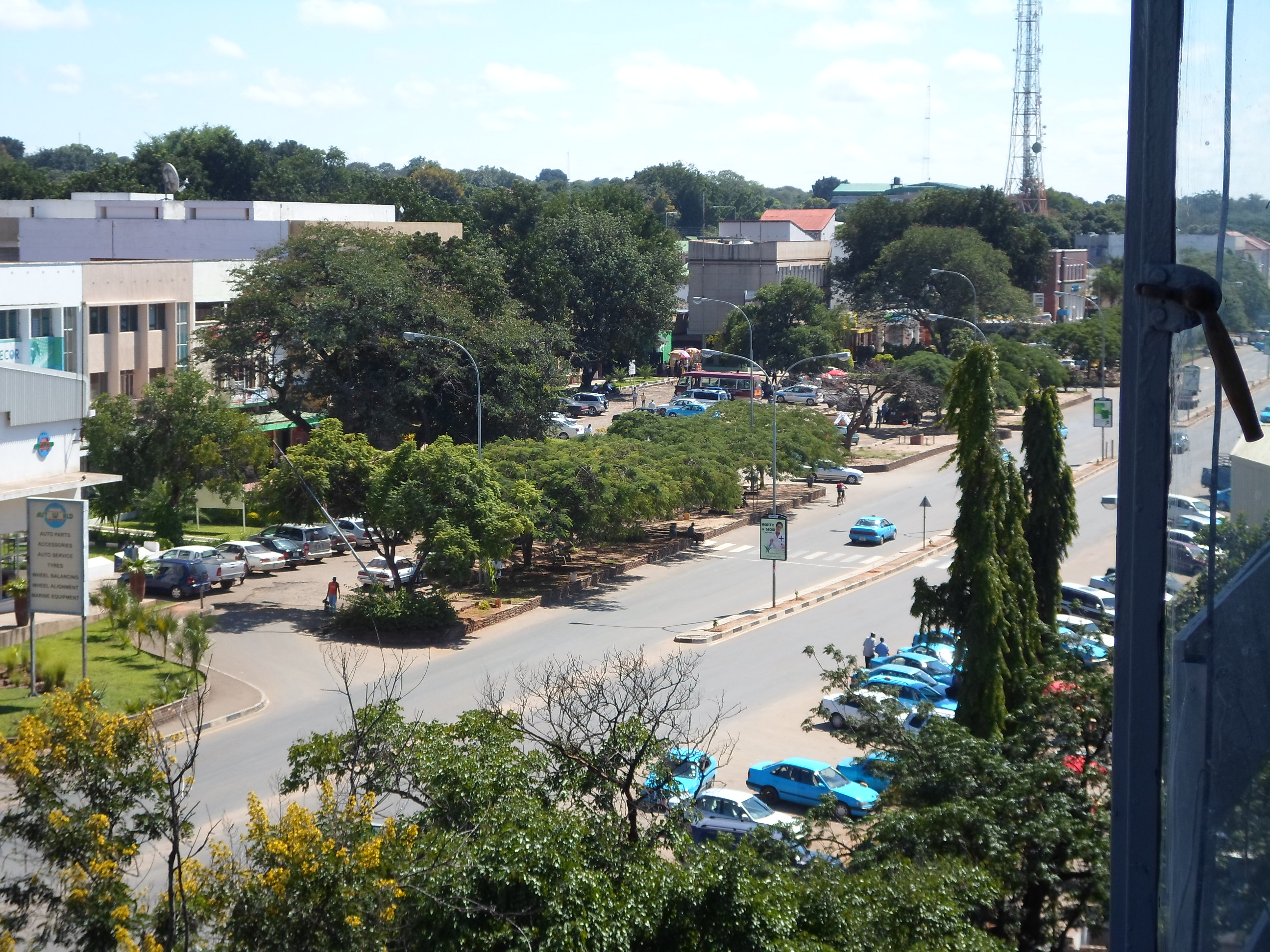
The dual carriageway section of the T1 road in Livingstone (2013)

The T1 continues southwards for another 10 kilometres (6 mi) to the Victoria Falls, where it crosses the Zambezi River via the Victoria Falls Bridge into the Republic of Zimbabwe, where it becomes the A8 road to Bulawayo. The border city on the other side of the Zambezi River crossing is also named Victoria Falls.

== Road Network ==
This route is entirely part of Trans-African Highway number 4 or Cairo-Cape Town Highway, which links Cairo in Egypt with Gaborone in Botswana and Cape Town in South Africa. It is also part of the Walvis Bay-Ndola-Lubumbashi Development Road.

It is also part of the route that motorists and heavy cargo trucks from Botswana, Namibia and parts of South Africa use to reach Lusaka, Zambia's capital city. From Lusaka, this traffic continues to the north and east, including to Tanzania, Malawi and the Democratic Republic of the Congo.

As a result, the road may be very busy and occupied with trucks, cars and buses, in either direction. As the road is one lane in each direction, heavy traffic and traffic jams are common.

== Great North Road ==
This road connecting Lusaka and Livingstone (which was the capital of the nation before 1935) was originally regarded as being part of the Great North Road of Zambia. Then, after the capital of the nation became Lusaka in 1935, Lusaka was regarded as the southern terminus of the Great North Road and this road connecting Lusaka to Livingstone was no-longer regarded as part of the route.

== See also ==
- Great North Road, Zambia
- Transport in Zambia
- Roads in Zambia
