= Tonga people (disambiguation) =

Tonga people may refer to several ethnic groups:

- Tonga people (Zambia and Zimbabwe)
- Tonga people (Malawi), a sub group of Tumbuka people
- Tongans, a Polynesian group
