= Namwala East =

National Assembly constituency in Zambia

Namwala East is a constituency of the National Assembly of Zambia. It was created in 2026 when Namwala constituency was split into two constituencies (Namwala West & Namwala East). It covers the eastern part of Namwala District.

== List of MPs ==
Election year	MP	Party
2026	Olive Chiboola	United Party for National Development
