= Namwala West =

National Assembly constituency in Zambia

Namwala West is a constituency of the National Assembly of Zambia. It was created in 2026 when Namwala constituency was split into two constituencies (Namwala West & Namwala East). It covers the western part of Namwala District.

== List of MPs ==
Election year	MP	Party
2026	Herbert Mapani	United Party for National Development
