= Dundumwenzi (constituency) =

Constituency of the National Assembly of Zambia

Dundumwenzi is a constituency of the National Assembly of Zambia. It covers Dundumwezi in Kalomo District of Southern Province.

== List of MPs ==
Election year	MP	Party
Dundumwense
1973	Abel Munampamba	United National Independence Party
1978	Abel Munampamba	United National Independence Party
1983	Jonathan Sing'ombe	United National Independence Party
1988	Jonathan Sing'ombe	United National Independence Party
Dundumwenzi
1991	Myers Maingalila	Movement for Multi-Party Democracy
1996	Muchindu Chibambula	Movement for Multi-Party Democracy
2001	Emmerson Mudenda	United Party for National Development
2006	Edgar Sing'ombe	Independent
2011	Edgar Sing'ombe	United Party for National Development
2016	Edgar Sing'ombe	United Party for National Development
2021	Edgar Sing'ombe	United Party for National Development
2026	Edgar Sing'ombe	United Party for National Development
