= Livingstone, Zambia =

Livingstone
- City
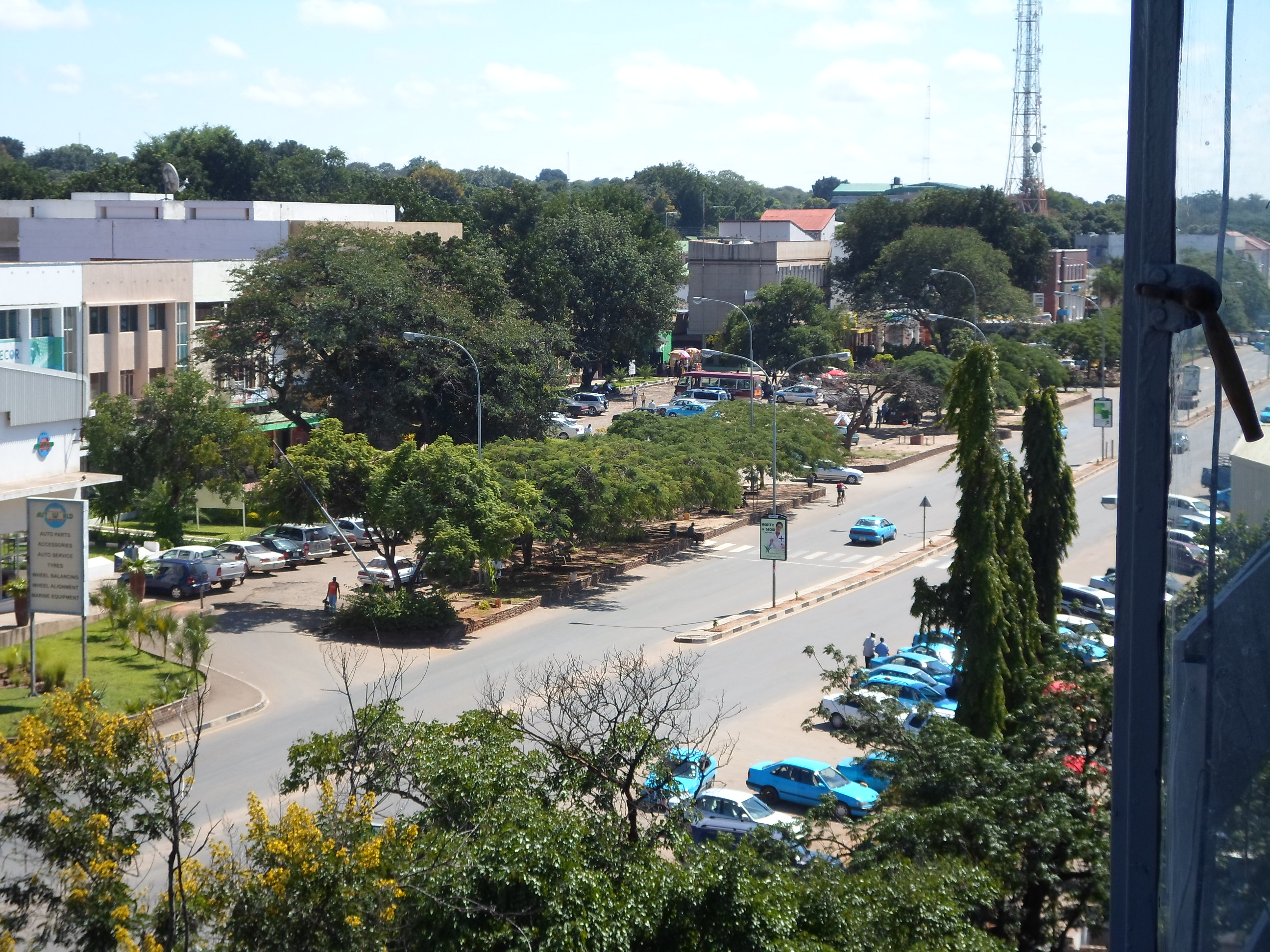

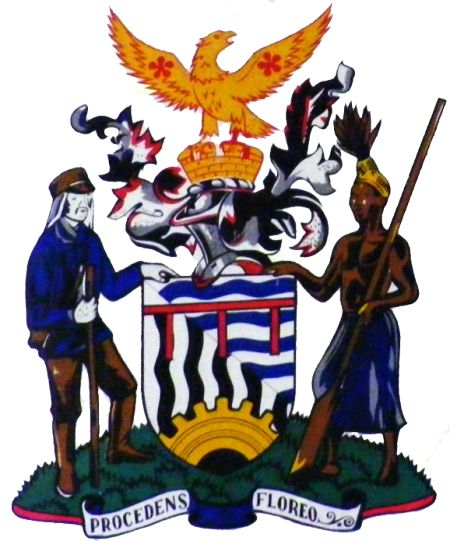
- Seal
- Interactive map of Livingstone
- Location in Zambia Livingstone (Africa)
- Coordinates: 17°51′S 25°52′E
- Country: Zambia
- Province: Southern Province
- District: Livingstone District

Area
- 695 km^{2} (268 sq mi)
- Elevation: 986 m (3,235 ft)

Population (2010 census)
  - Total: 134,349
  - Ethnicities: Tonga Baleya (Leya people) Toka people and Lunda people
  - Languages: English (official language) Tonga language and Lozi language
- Time zone: UTC+2 (CAT)
- Climate: BSh
- Website: livcity.org

Livingstone is a city in Southern Province, Zambia. Lying 10 km (6 mi) to the north of the Zambezi River, it is a tourist attraction due to its proximity to the Victoria Falls and its road and rail connections to Victoria Falls, Zimbabwe, the resort town on the opposite side of the falls. A historic British colonial city, its present population was listed at 177,393 inhabitants at the 2022 census. It is named after David Livingstone, the Scottish explorer and missionary who was the first European to explore the area. From 1911 until 1935, it served as the first capital of Northern Rhodesia. From 1907 to 2011, when replaced by Choma, Livingstone was the capital of Zambia's Southern Province.

== History ==
=== Pre-colonial history ===
Mukuni, 9.6 km (6 mi) to the south-east of present-day Livingstone, was the largest village in the area before Livingstone was founded. Its Baleya inhabitants, originally from the Rozwi culture in Zimbabwe, were conquered by Chief Mukuni who came from the Congo in the 16th century. Another group of Baleya under Chief Sekute lived near the river west of the town. The predominant people in the area, though, were the Batoka under Chief Musokotwane based at Senkobo, 30 km (19 mi) north. These are southern Tonga people but are culturally and linguistically similar to the Baleya.

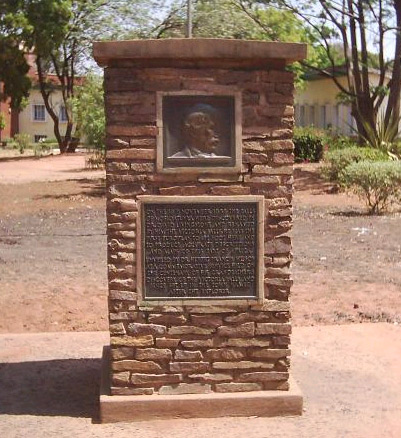
Memorial to David Livingstone

The Subiya paid tribute to the Lozi of Barotseland but in 1838 the Kololo, a Sotho tribe from South Africa displaced by Zulu wars, migrated north and conquered the Lozi. The Kololo placed chiefs of their subordinate Subiya people of Sesheke over the Tokaleya. In 1855 Scottish missionary traveller David Livingstone became the first European to be shown the Zambezi in Livingstone's vicinity, and to see Victoria Falls by the Subiya-Kololo Chief Sekeletu.

=== Colonial history ===
In the 1890s Cecil Rhodes's British South Africa Company established British rule north of the Zambezi and launched a wave of mineral prospecting and exploration activity, in addition ventured into other natural resources such as timber, ivory and animal skins in a territory called North-Western Rhodesia. The main crossing point of the Zambezi was above the falls at the Old Drift, first by dugout canoe, later by an iron boat propelled by eight Lozi paddlers, or a barge towed across with a steel cable. The Batoka Gorge and the deep valley and gorges of the middle Zambezi (now flooded by the Kariba Dam) meant there was no better crossing point between the Falls and Kariba Gorge, 483 km (300 mi) north-east. As the Old Drift crossing became more frequently used, a British colonial settlement sprang up there and around 1897 it became the first municipality in the country; it is sometimes referred to as 'Old Livingstone'. Its proximity to mosquito breeding areas caused deaths from malaria, prompting the Europeans to move to the higher ground known as Constitution Hill or Sandbelt Post Office after 1900. As that area grew into a town it was named Livingstone in honour of the explorer.

In the mid-1890s Rhodesia Railways had reached Bulawayo in Southern Rhodesia spurring industrial development there, fueled by the coal mines at Hwange (then named Wankie) just 110 km (68 mi) south-east of Mosi-oa-Tunya. The railway was extended to Hwange for the coal, but Rhodes's vision was to keep pushing north to extend the British Empire, and he would have built it to Cairo if he could. In 1904 the railway reached the Falls on the southern side and construction of the Victoria Falls Bridge started. Too impatient to wait for its completion, Rhodes had the line from Livingstone to Kalomo built and operations started some months in advance of the bridge using a single locomotive which was conveyed in pieces by temporary cableway across the gorge next to the bridge building site.

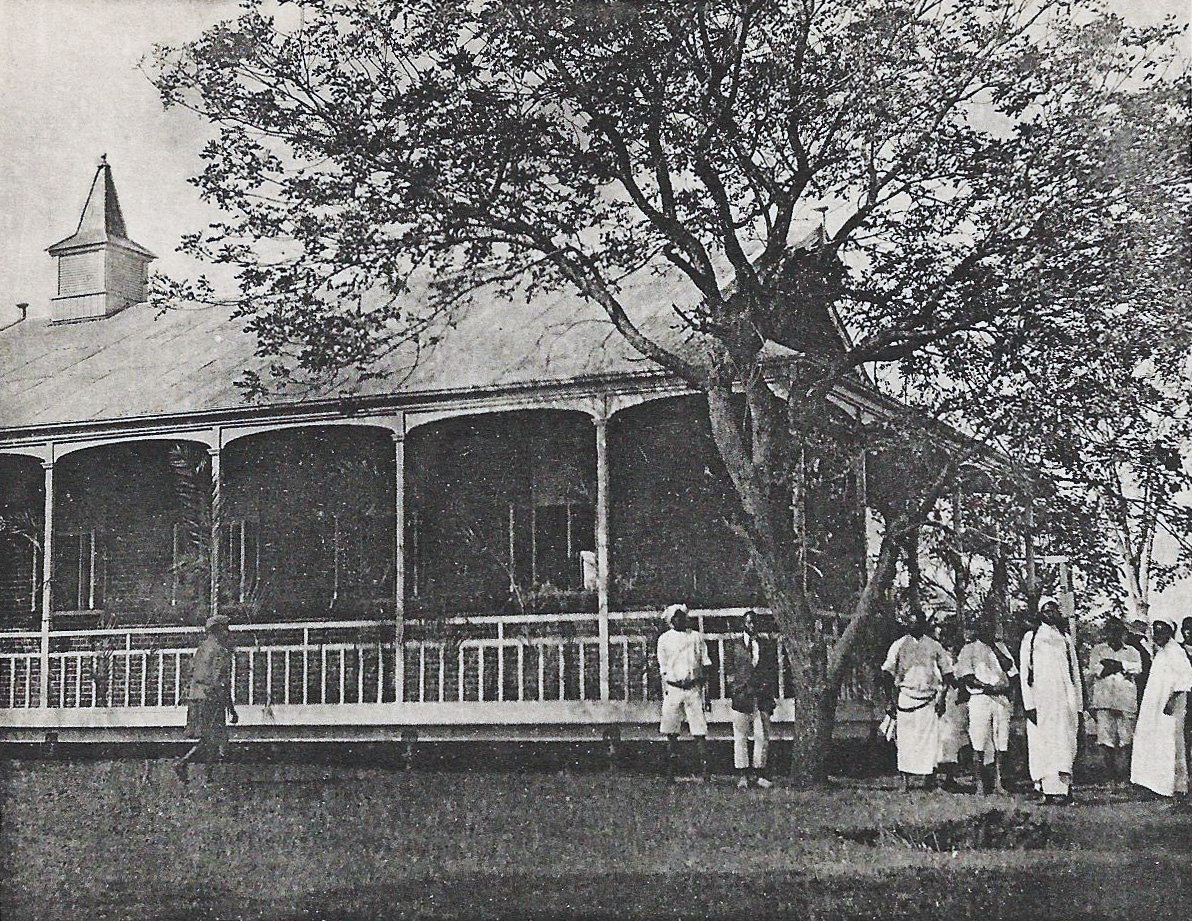
Livingstone in the early 20th century

The city was founded in 1905. The British South Africa Company moved the capital of the territory there in 1907. In 1911 the company merged the territory with North-Eastern Rhodesia as Northern Rhodesia. Livingstone prospered from its position as a gateway for trade between the north and south sides of the Zambezi, as well as from farming in the Southern Province and commercial timber production from forests to the north-west. A number of colonial buildings were erected which still stand. Although the capital was moved to Lusaka in 1935 to be closer to the economic heartland of the Copperbelt, industries based on timber, hides, tobacco, cotton (including textiles) and other agricultural products grew. A hydroelectric plant was built taking water from the Eastern Cataract of the Falls. The town of Victoria Falls in Southern Rhodesia had the tourist trade, but many supplies were bought from Livingstone.

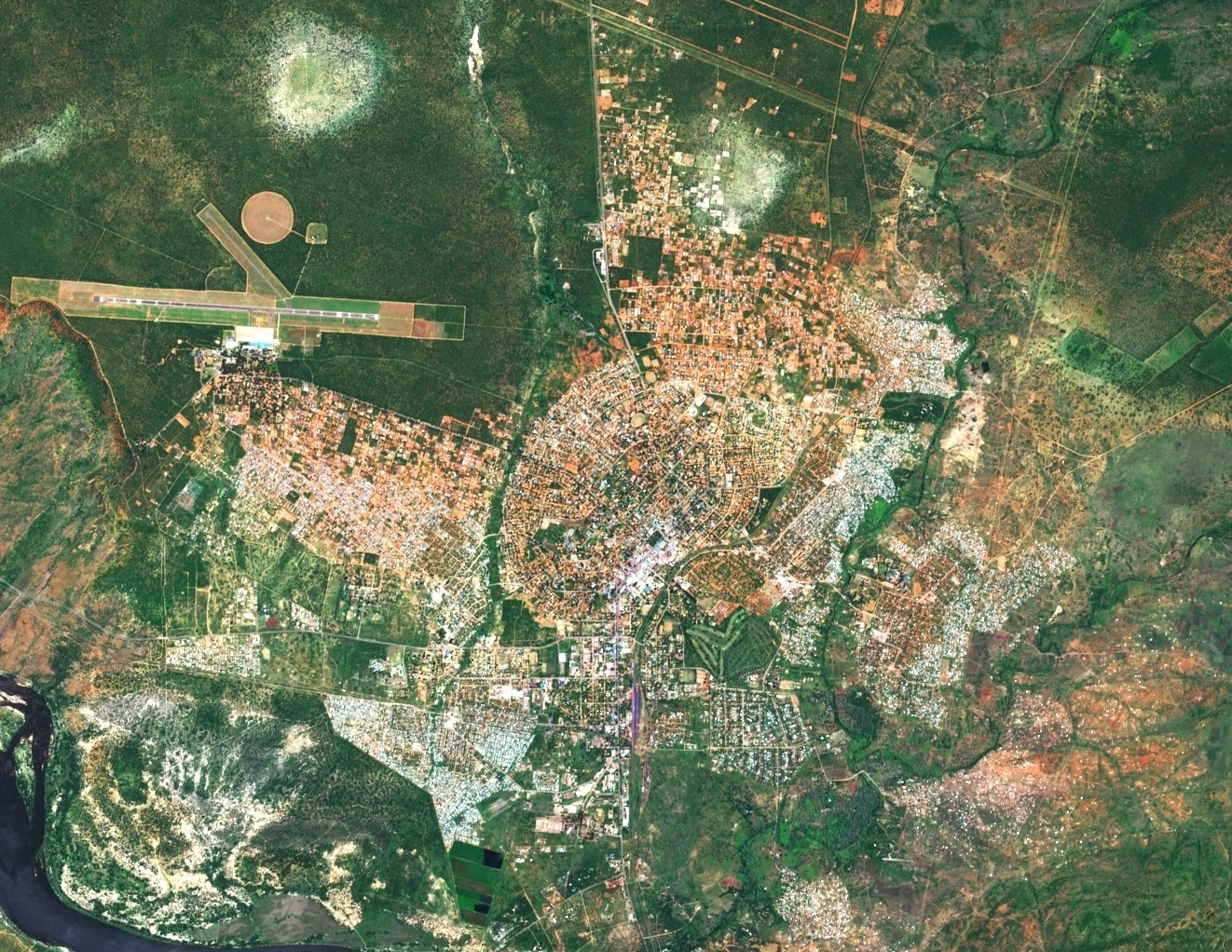
A 2019 satellite image of Livingstone, showing the suburbs and airport

Of all the towns in Northern Rhodesia, colonial Livingstone took on the most British character. Surrounded by a large number of African settlements, the city was segregated. The north and western areas of the town and the town centre were reserved for the colonial government and white-owned businesses and associated residential areas, while African townships such as Maramba (named after the small Maramba River flowing nearby) were in the east and south and were inhabited by workers, servants, craftsman, tradesman, as well as a large numbers of non-working black families living on welfare. Asians and people of mixed race owned businesses in the middle, on the eastern side of the city centre.

During World War II, 170 Polish refugees escaping from German- and Soviet-occupied Poland, were admitted to Livingstone in 1941, and a Polish consular post was established.

As the British government began publicly discussing independence, and news of the large scale massacres of white colonists in the nearby Belgian Congo became evident, many white residents, fearing abandonment by the British colonial government, began migrating south towards Southern Rhodesia or South Africa. When Northern Rhodesia obtained independence as Zambia in 1964, many more whites left. When Zambia gained independence there were only 100 black college graduates in the country, almost all in social sciences from the University of Fort Hare in South Africa. In 1968, a one party state had been established which seized most remaining non-black property, especially those of whites. Consequently, most of the remaining Northern Rhodesians left after an official policy of nationalisation in Zambia was announced.

=== Post-independence ===
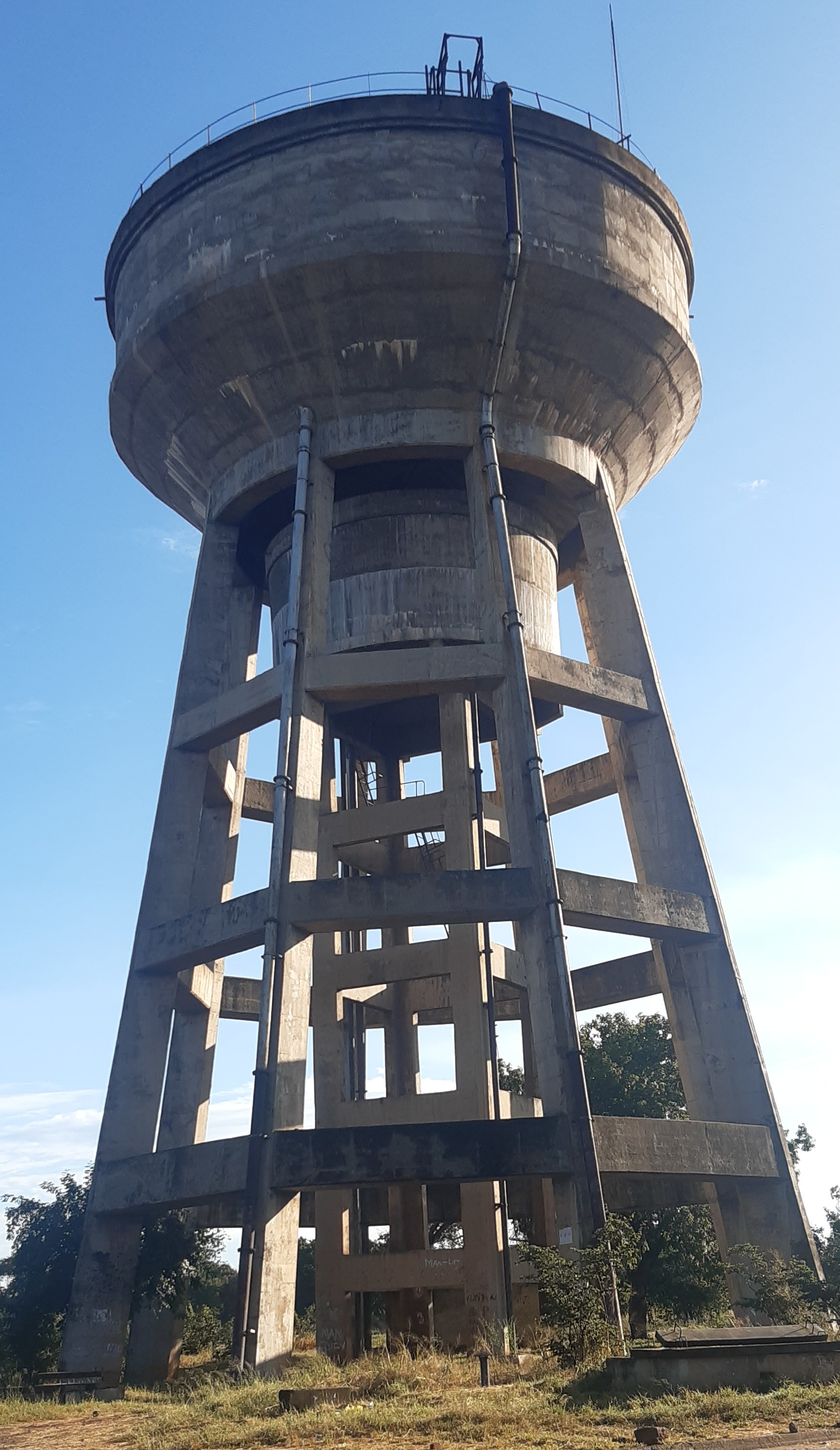
The Livingstone Water Tank

Some colonial civic buildings were destroyed and replaced with an African architecture, although Livingstone was used as a location for a 1950s Rhodesian town in the 1981 movie The Grass Is Singing (based on the Doris Lessing novel of that name). At the same time, a large infusion of cash from the British government to Zambia at independence was partially used in Livingstone. Livingstone suffered economic decline in the 1970s due in part to renationalisation of industries and in part to closure of the border with Rhodesia, first by the Zambian government and later by the Rhodesian authorities.

Since the beginning of the 21st century, Livingstone has experienced a resurgence in tourism and has firmly become the destination of choice when visiting the Victoria Falls. Livingstone has enjoyed a slight influx of investment in the industry from modern hotel chains like Sun International, to some modern street strip mall centers and restaurants. Apart from tourism, the other hope on Livingstone's horizon is development stimulated by the Walvis Bay Corridor with the opening of the Katima Mulilo Bridge and completion of the Trans–Caprivi Highway 200 km (120 mi) west, which funnels more trade through the town.

== Climate ==
Livingstone has a hot semi-arid climate (Köppen: BSh) with hot and rainy wet seasons and very hot pre-wet seasons and mild dry seasons with large temperature differences between day and night.

Climate data for Livingstone (1991–2020, extremes 1918–present)
Month	Jan	Feb	Mar	Apr	May	Jun	Jul	Aug	Sep	Oct	Nov	Dec	Year
Record high °C (°F)	39.9 (103.8)	38.4 (101.1)	43.6 (110.5)	37.0 (98.6)	36.0 (96.8)	35.0 (95.0)	32.6 (90.7)	37.5 (99.5)	40.1 (104.2)	41.3 (106.3)	41.1 (106.0)	39.5 (103.1)	43.6 (110.5)
Mean daily maximum °C (°F)	30.9 (87.6)	30.7 (87.3)	31.1 (88.0)	30.6 (87.1)	29.0 (84.2)	26.5 (79.7)	26.1 (79.0)	29.8 (85.6)	33.6 (92.5)	35.6 (96.1)	33.9 (93.0)	31.5 (88.7)	30.8 (87.4)
Daily mean °C (°F)	25.2 (77.4)	24.9 (76.8)	24.6 (76.3)	22.9 (73.2)	20.1 (68.2)	17.4 (63.3)	16.9 (62.4)	20.4 (68.7)	24.5 (76.1)	27.4 (81.3)	27.0 (80.6)	25.6 (78.1)	23.0 (73.4)
Mean daily minimum °C (°F)	19.4 (66.9)	19.0 (66.2)	18.0 (64.4)	15.1 (59.2)	11.1 (52.0)	8.2 (46.8)	7.6 (45.7)	10.9 (51.6)	15.4 (59.7)	19.2 (66.6)	20.0 (68.0)	19.6 (67.3)	15.3 (59.5)
Record low °C (°F)	9.8 (49.6)	8.0 (46.4)	7.0 (44.6)	4.3 (39.7)	0.5 (32.9)	−5.9 (21.4)	−3.0 (26.6)	−1.7 (28.9)	1.0 (33.8)	8.1 (46.6)	11.0 (51.8)	10.8 (51.4)	−5.9 (21.4)
Average precipitation mm (inches)	175.2 (6.90)	133.2 (5.24)	83.3 (3.28)	19.5 (0.77)	2.4 (0.09)	0.2 (0.01)	0.1 (0.00)	0.3 (0.01)	1.4 (0.06)	11.1 (0.44)	77.7 (3.06)	141.9 (5.59)	646.3 (25.44)
Average relative humidity (%)	74.8	77.3	72.2	65.1	57.7	55.0	51.8	43.3	35.1	41.7	55.2	71.0	58.4
Mean monthly sunshine hours	213.9	196.0	251.1	273.0	303.8	288.0	310.0	319.3	297.0	279.0	228.0	207.7	3,166.8
Source 1: NOAA (humidity and sun 1961–1990)
Source 2: Meteo Climat (record highs and lows)

== Transport ==
=== Air ===
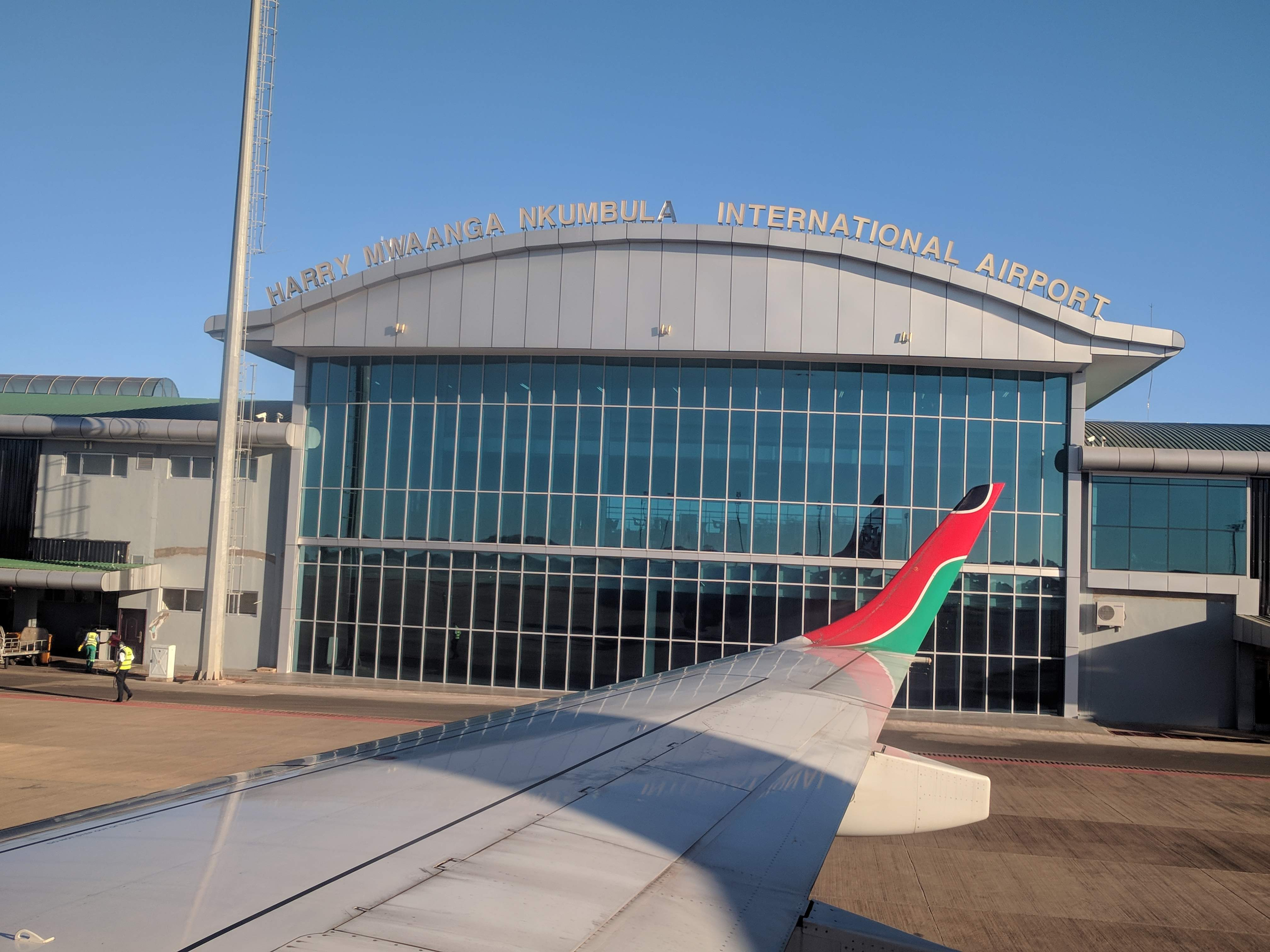
Main terminal of the Harry Mwaanga Nkumbula International Airport

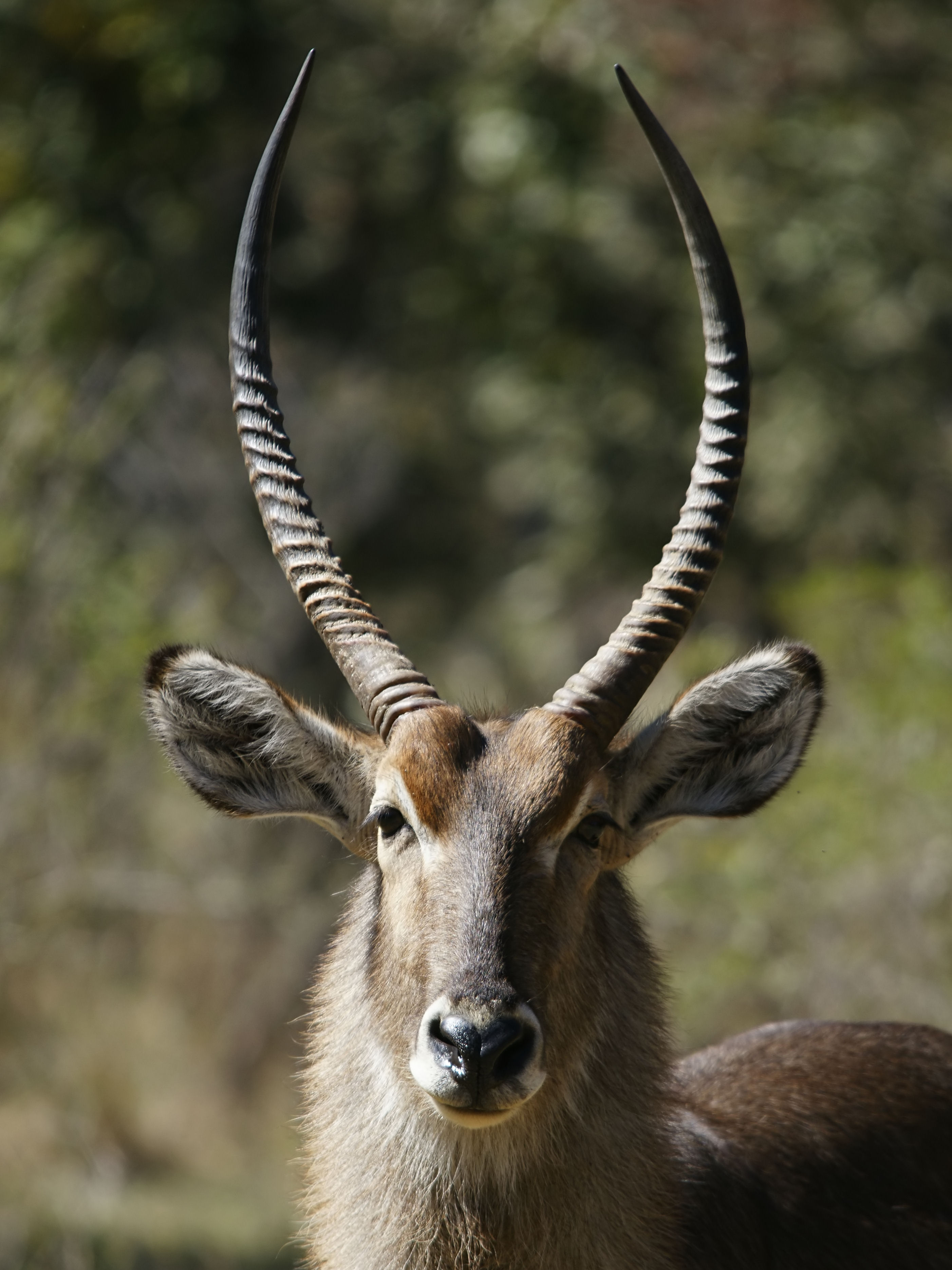
An ellipsen waterbuck at Mosi-oa-Tunya National Park, which is wedged between the city and the Zambezi River

The city is served by Harry Mwaanga Nkumbula International Airport, which receives domestic flights from Lusaka and connects with various international cities, including Johannesburg, Cape Town, Mbombela & Nairobi.

=== Rail ===
The city is served by the Zambia Railways main line which connects it to Choma, Mazabuka and Lusaka in the north and the National Railways of Zimbabwe line to Bulawayo in the south. The Mulobezi Railway connects Livingstone to the Mulobezi timber industry in the west.

=== Road ===
The Lusaka-Livingstone road (T1 road) connects Livingstone with Kalomo, Choma and the national capital (Lusaka) in the north-east. The same road connects southwards, crossing into Zimbabwe via Victoria Falls Bridge (weight restrictions apply) (becoming the A8 road on the Zimbabwean side and passing through Victoria Falls Town before proceeding to Bulawayo).

The M10 road connects westwards to Kazungula (where the Kazungula Bridge, formerly the Kazungula Ferry, connects with the border into Botswana) and to Sesheke (where it crosses the Zambezi as the Katima Mulilo Bridge and reaches the Katima Mulilo Border with Namibia). This road from Livingstone to the Katima Mulilo Bridge is part of the Walvis Bay-Ndola-Lubumbashi Development Road. The M10 further connects with Senanga and Mongu.

== Places of worship ==
The places of worship are predominantly Christian churches and temples: Roman Catholic Diocese of Livingstone (Catholic Church), United Church in Zambia (World Communion of Reformed Churches), Mount Zion Christian Centre - Livingstone (Pentecostal Church), Reformed Church in Zambia (World Communion of Reformed Churches), Baptist Union of Zambia (Baptist World Alliance), and Assemblies of God. There are also Muslim mosques and Hindu temples. Livingstone formerly hosted a strong Jewish community.

== Culture ==
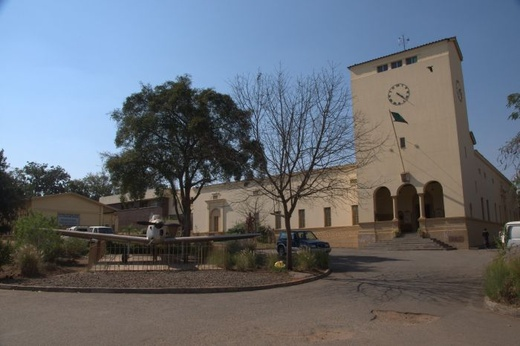
Façade of the Livingstone Museum

Livingstone has various museums, like the Livingstone Museum (archaeology, ethnography and history and contains a collection of memorabilia relating to David Livingstone), the Maramba Cultural Museum (featuring traditional dancing, singing, costumes), the Railway Museum of the Mulobezi Railway and the Victoria Falls Field Museum (featuring geology and archaeology around the Falls).

== Education ==
Secondary schools in the area include Hillcrest Technical Secondary School and Linda Secondary School.

== Twin towns – sister cities ==
Livingstone is twinned with:

- Funchal, Portugal
- Santa Fe, United States

== See also ==
- Victoria Falls, Zimbabwe (the adjacent Zimbabwean city)

== Bibliography ==
1. Apthorpe, R. (1960)-Rhodes Livingstone Institute Journal-Problems of African History, the Nsenga of Northern Rhodesia (Government Printer, Lusaka) page 58. Colson E. and Gluckman M (1961)-Seven Tribes of British Central Africa – The plateau Tonga of Northern Rhodesia (Manchester University Press, Manchester) pages 95,103 and 129. Douglas S.D. (1961) – The Stories of the Ancient Lore of the Bene Mukuni page 19. Manchishi P.C. and Musona E.T. – The People of Zambia – The Short History of the Soli (Multimedia, Lusaka) page 2 Poole L. (1938) – The Native Tribes of the East Luangwa Province of Northern Rhodesia (Government Printer, Lusaka) page 45
2. Muntemba, M (1970), Zambia Museums Journal, Volume 1- The Political and Ritual Sovereignty Among the Mukuni Leya of Zambia page 29. Mwale B.B. – About the Acewa, History and customs of the Cewa people chapter V. Poole L. (1938), The Native Tribes of the East Luangwa Province of Northern Rhodesia (Government Printer, Lusaka) page 45. Undi Gawa Kalonga Chivunga, Paramount Chief (1970) Interview.
3. Brelsford, W. V. (1965) – The Tribes of Zambia – The Gwembe Valley People (Government Printer, Lusaka) page 73. Brelsford, W. V. (1965) – The Tribes of Zambia – The Lenje Soli People (Government Printer, Lusaka) page 75. Colson E. (1960)-Kariba Studies (Manchester University Press, Manchester) page 168. Colson E. and Gluckman M (1961)-Seven Tribes of British Central Africa – The plateau Tonga of Northern Rhodesia (Manchester University Press, Manchester) page 132.Fagan, B.M and Philipson D.W (1965), the Iron Age Sequence at Lochnivar and the Tonga, Journal of the Royal Anthropological Institute. Volume 95 part 2. Field, S. A. (1961) Visilano, History Project U.M.C.A Msoro. Chapters 41, 42, 43, 45, 46 and 47. Government of Zambia – Statutory Instrument number 146 of 1998 (Government Printer, Lusaka) page 521. Government of Zambia – Statutory Instrument numbers 22 and 23 of 1999 (Government Printer, Lusaka) page 43 and 45. Kaulu, M. G. (1995) District notes (ODG/SIN/102/15/2) – A Brief History of Mwemba Chieftainship pages 1, 2, 3, 4 and 5 Langworthy, H.W. (1972), Zambia Before 1890: Aspects of Pre-Colonial History (Dai Nippon Printing Company (HG) Limited Hong Kong) page 23. Liteta Chinkuli Wilson – Senior Chief Mukuni N’gombe (1990) interview. Malala Muzamba II- Be-Dyango XV (1958) interview. Mukuni Siloka II (1957), A Short History Of the Baleya People (Government Printer, Lusaka) pages 4, 5, 6 and 7. Muntemba, M (1970) Zambia Museums Journal Volume 1. The Political and Ritual Sovereignty Among the Mukuni Leya of Zambia. page 29. Mwale B.B. – About the Acewa, History and customs of the Cewa people chapter V. Siampande Siamayuwa Senior Chief Mwemba (1990) interview. Sekute Kalonga Chief (1957) Interview
4. Brelsford, W. V. (1965) – The Tribes of Zambia – The Gwembe Valley People (Government Printer, Lusaka) pages 70 and 72. Colson E. and Gluckman M (1961)-Seven Tribes of British Central Africa – The Lozi of Barotseland (Manchester University Press, Manchester) page 19. Colson E. and Gluckman M (1961)-Seven Tribes of British Central Africa – The Plateau Tonga (Manchester University Press, Manchester) page 96 Gyenkye (1996) The African Chief, page 109. Langworthy, H.W. (1972), Zambia Before 1890: Aspects of Pre-Colonial History (Dai Nippon Printing Company (HG) Limited Hong Kong) pages 25 and 119. Malala Muzamba II- Be-Dyango XV (1958) interview. Memo 376/27/5/B (1933) Minutes – Kalomo Native Authority meeting (1936) Malahasi Lwangulamombo, Sikukwila (1958) interview. Mubila Philemon, Mwendambeli (1987) interview. Munongo Bantu Mwenda Msiri Mwami (2006) interview. Muntemba, M (1970) Zambia Museums Journal Volume 1. The Political and Ritual Sovereignty Among the Mukuni Leya of Zambia, pages 30, 31 and 32. Sialutaba Josephat, Mutoozi We Namunaki (1987) interview. Vogel Joseph, O. (1975) Simbusenga (Oxford University Press, Oxford) page 47. Yanina Munchindu, Inabuze (1987) Interview.
5. Muntemba, M (1970) Zambia Museums Journal Volume I – The Political and Ritual Sovereignty Among the Mukuni Leya of Zambia – pages 30 and 34.
6. Malala Muzamba II Be-Dyango XV (1958) Interview. Mubila Mwendambeli (1986) assisting in the Siloka III Mukuni XIX Investiture rites. Mukasimalweza Muzamba III Be-Dyango XVIII (1986) conducting coronation rites. Mukanyemba Mukalaso Siamachoka Mwanengwelele (1986) assisting in the Siloka III Mukuni XIX Investiture rites. Siloka III Mukuni XIX (1986) coronation rites, personal experience.
7. Muntemba, M (1970) Zambia Museums Journal Volume I – The Political and Ritual Sovereignty Among the Mukuni Leya of Zambia – pages 30 and 34.
8. Malala Muzamba II Be-Dyango XV (1958) Interview. Mubila Mwendambeli (1986) assisting in the Siloka III Mukuni XIX Investiture rites. Mukasimalweza Muzamba III Be-Dyango XVIII (1986) conducting coronation rites. Mukanyemba Mukalaso Siamachoka Mwanengwelele (1986) assisting in the Siloka III Mukuni XIX Investiture rites. Siloka III Mukuni XIX (1986) coronation rites, personal experience.
