= Zimba District =

Coordinates: 17°37′S 26°33′E

- District
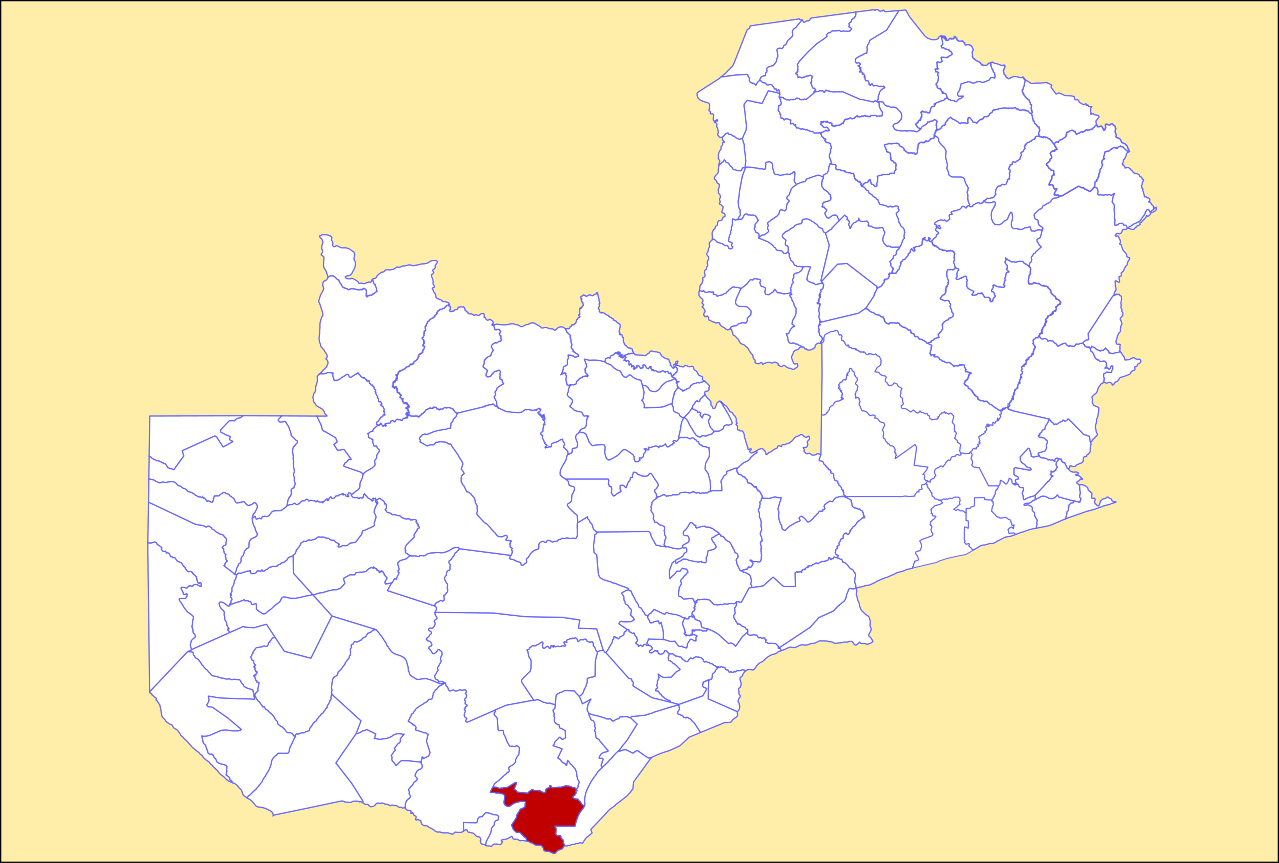
- District location in Zambia
- Country: Zambia
- Province: Southern Province

Area
  - Total: 5,480.1 km^{2} (2,115.9 sq mi)

Population (2022)
  - Total: Approx 108,316
  - Density: 3.8/km^{2} (9.8/sq mi)
- Time zone: UTC+2 (CAT)

Zimba District is a district of Southern Province, Zambia. Its capital lies at Zimba. It was separated from Kalomo District in 2012.
