= Maramba Cultural Museum =

Museum in Livingstone, Zambia

The Maramba Cultural Museum is a museum in Livingstone, Zambia, dedicated to the preservation of traditional Zambian culture and art.
