= Choma Museum and Crafts Centre =

Museum in Zambia

The Choma Museum and Crafts Centre
- Established: 1988
- Location: Choma, Zambia
- Website: Choma Museum Art Gallery

The Choma Museum and Crafts Centre is a museum in Choma, Zambia, dedicated to preserving the heritage of the Tonga tribe. It houses and sells traditional crafts and artifacts.

The museum displays the cultural heritage of the Tonga tribe of the Southern Province of Zambia. It houses many traditional artifacts including beadwork, musical instruments, spears, clay figurines and jewelry. The Museum's crafts projects stimulate production of local crafts such as baskets, beadwork, carving, etc. It saves to preserve the local traditional skills and providing an alternative form of income to the people of Southern Province of Zambia. It also has a collection cultural and historical artifacts. It includes the material culture of the Tonga people.
