= Pemba, Zambia =

Pemba
- Town
- Location within Zambia
- Coordinates: 16°32′00″S 27°22′00″E
- Country: Zambia
- Province: Southern Province
- District: Pemba District
- Time zone: UTC+2 (CAT)

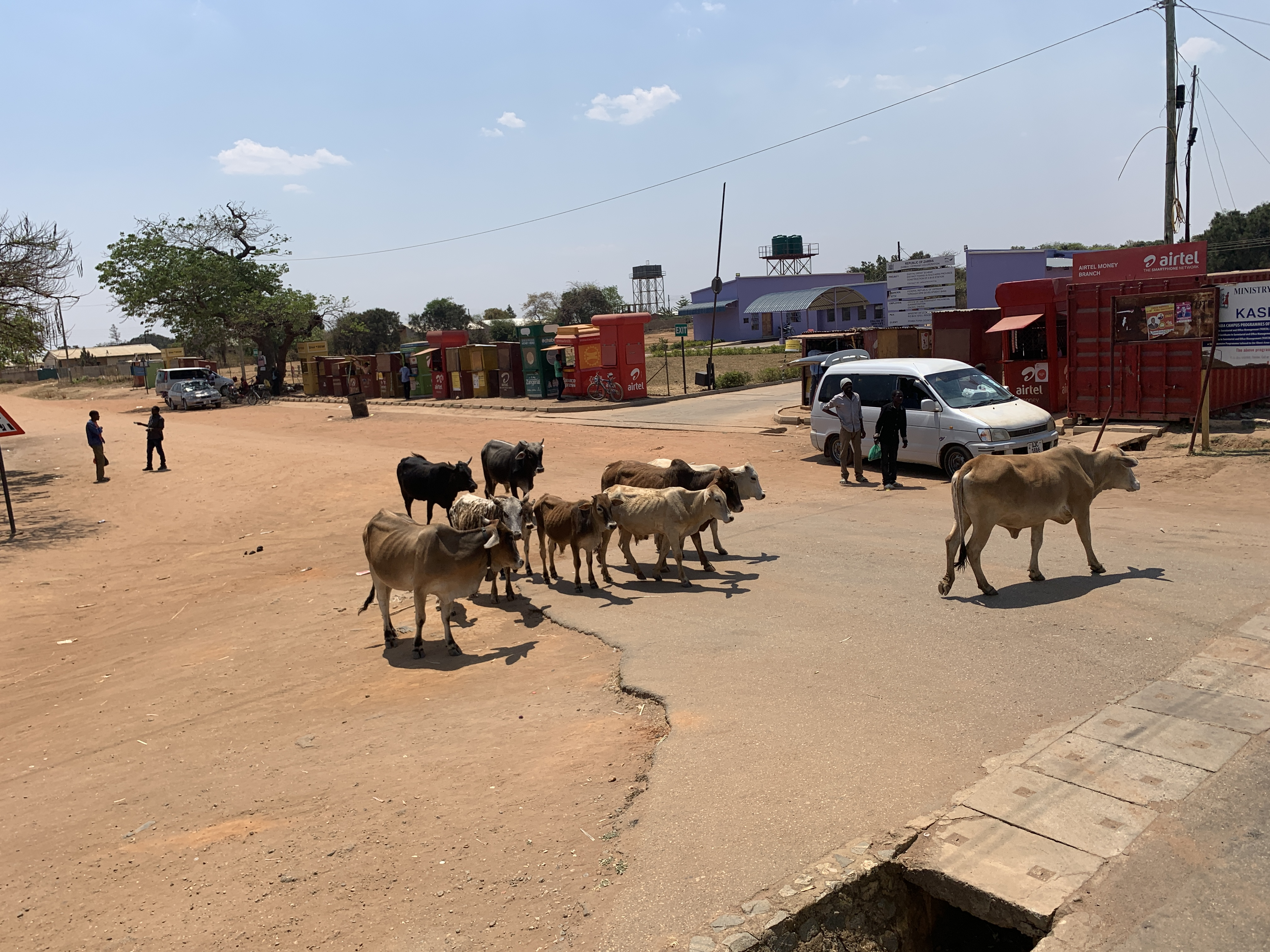
Pemba, Zambia

Pemba is a small town (population about 4,000) located in Pemba District of the Southern Province of Zambia. It is situated on the Lusaka–Livingstone Road, midway between Lusaka and Livingstone. The main ethnic group in the town are the Tonga.

Pemba was declared a district by President Michael Chilufya Sata in 2012. Before that, it was part of Choma District.
