= Zimba, Zambia =

Zimba
- Town
- Location in Zambia
- Country: Zambia
- Province: Southern Province
- District: Zimba
- Climate: BSh

Zimba is a market town in southern Zambia, 70 kilometres northeast of Livingstone, on the main road and railway line to Lusaka.

== See also ==
- Railway stations in Zambia
