= Siavonga District =

Coordinates: 16°27′S 28°28′E

- District
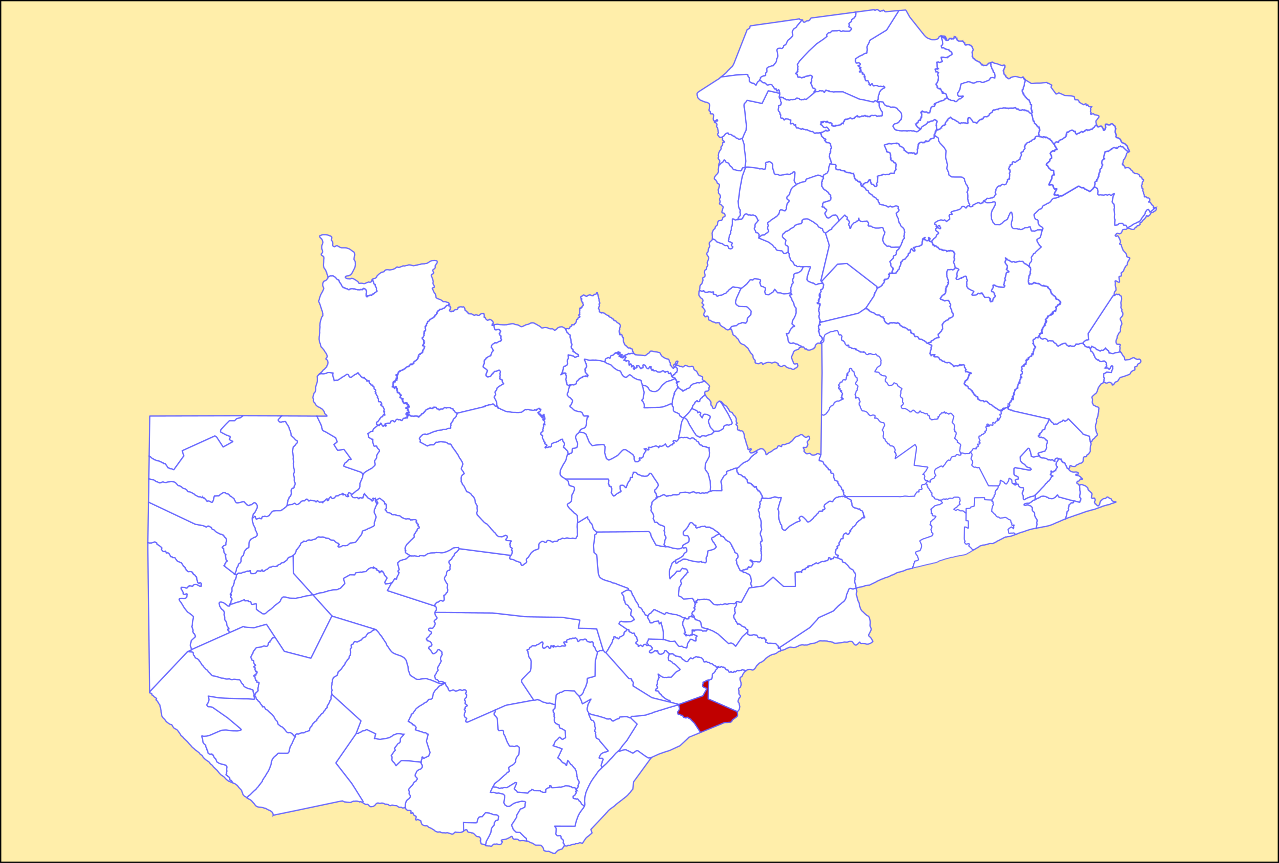
- District location in Zambia
- Country: Zambia
- Province: Southern Province
- Capital: Siavonga

Area
  - Total: 2,540.8 km^{2} (981.0 sq mi)

Population (2022)
  - Total: 66,030
  - Density: 25.99/km^{2} (67.31/sq mi)
- Time zone: UTC+2 (CAT)

Siavonga District is a district of Zambia, located in Southern Province. The capital lies at Siavonga. As of the 2022 Zambian Census, the district had a population of 66,030 people. It is separated from Zimbabwe by Lake Kariba.
