= Pemba Airport =

Pemba Airport may refer to:

- Pemba Airport (Mozambique) in Pemba, Mozambique (IATA: POL, ICAO: FQPB)
- Pemba Airport (Tanzania) on Pemba Island, Zanzibar, Tanzania (IATA: PMA, ICAO: HTPE)
