= Choma, Zambia =

Choma
- Town
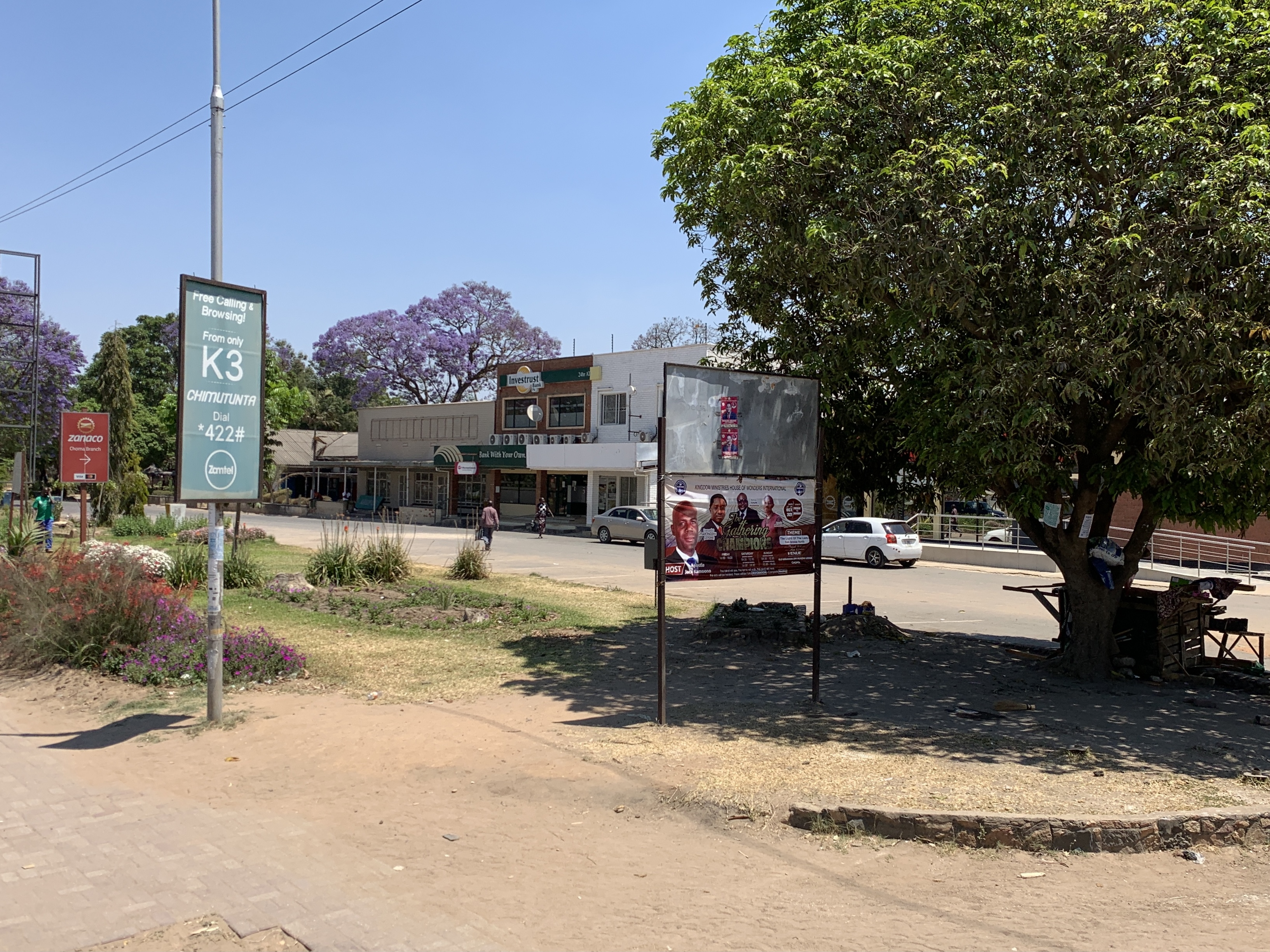

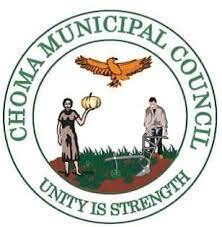
- Seal

- Location in Zambia
- Coordinates: 16°46′16″S 26°59′32″E
- Country: Zambia
- Province: Southern Province
- District: Choma District
- Elevation: 4,386 ft (1,337 m)

Population (2010 Census)
  - Total: 51,842
- Time zone: UTC+02:00 (CAT)

Choma is a town that serves as the capital of the Southern Province of Zambia. It is also the capital of Choma District, one of the 15 administrative districts in the province.

== Geography ==
=== Location ===
Choma lies on the Lusaka–Livingstone Road, approximately 292 kilometres (181 mi) south-west of Lusaka, the national capital and largest city in Zambia. This is approximately 194 kilometres (121 mi), by road, northeast of Livingstone, the largest city in Zambia's Southern Province. Choma is also a station on the Zambia Railways main line between Lusaka and Livingstone. The geographical coordinates of Choma are:16°46'16.0"S, 26°59'32.0"E (Latitude:-16.771111; Longitude:26.992222). Choma sits at an average elevation of 1,337 metres (4,386 ft) above mean sea level. The Nkanga River Conservation Area lies approximately 25 kilometres (16 mi) from Choma town.

=== Climate ===
Choma has the typical climate of southern Zambia with temperatures between 14 °C and 28 °C and sunshine ranging between 9 and 12 hours per day. The highest temperatures occur between the beginning of October and the end of December. Once the rains start, temperatures tend to fall, partly because of the rain and partly due to the often heavy cloud cover. The lowest temperatures are usually recorded in June and July.

The rains generally start in the middle of October and continue through up to the beginning of April. Rainfall reaches its peak around January after which it diminishes slightly up to the beginning of April when usually it ceases entirely. Choma has an average rainfall of 800 mm of which 369 mm falls in January and February. There are variations in total rainfall and rainfall patterns from year to year and even in a particular season. These variations can have a major impact on crop yield. Humidity falls to about 33% until the onset of rains in October after which it skyrockets to about 77% in February. Humidity nosedives once the rains cease in April. The wind is predominantly from the east and south-west, and to a lesser degree from the north-east. The strength of the wind from these directions can be comparatively strong.

Climate data for Choma (1991–2020)
Month	Jan	Feb	Mar	Apr	May	Jun	Jul	Aug	Sep	Oct	Nov	Dec	Year
Record high °C (°F)	37.2 (99.0)	35 (95)	34.9 (94.8)	34 (93)	32.5 (90.5)	34 (93)	31.1 (88.0)	34.1 (93.4)	37.6 (99.7)	39.6 (103.3)	39.2 (102.6)	35.9 (96.6)	39.6 (103.3)
Mean daily maximum °C (°F)	27.6 (81.7)	27.6 (81.7)	27.5 (81.5)	26.8 (80.2)	25.7 (78.3)	23.6 (74.5)	23.4 (74.1)	26.6 (79.9)	30.2 (86.4)	32.0 (89.6)	30.8 (87.4)	28.1 (82.6)	25.5 (77.9)
Daily mean °C (°F)	22.5 (72.5)	22.4 (72.3)	21.9 (71.4)	20.0 (68.0)	17.4 (63.3)	15.1 (59.2)	14.8 (58.6)	17.8 (64.0)	21.5 (70.7)	24.1 (75.4)	24.2 (75.6)	22.8 (73.0)	20.4 (68.7)
Mean daily minimum °C (°F)	17.3 (63.1)	17.1 (62.8)	16.3 (61.3)	13.2 (55.8)	9.1 (48.4)	6.6 (43.9)	6.1 (43.0)	8.9 (48.0)	12.8 (55.0)	16.2 (61.2)	17.5 (63.5)	17.5 (63.5)	12.3 (54.1)
Record low °C (°F)	11 (52)	10.6 (51.1)	10.2 (50.4)	6.2 (43.2)	0.5 (32.9)	−0.9 (30.4)	0.2 (32.4)	0.8 (33.4)	4 (39)	6.5 (43.7)	10.2 (50.4)	11.4 (52.5)	−0.9 (30.4)
Average precipitation mm (inches)	181.4 (7.14)	141.8 (5.58)	112.7 (4.44)	26.3 (1.04)	5.5 (0.22)	1.5 (0.06)	0.1 (0.00)	0.3 (0.01)	1.5 (0.06)	12.5 (0.49)	73.5 (2.89)	162.9 (6.41)	723.9 (28.50)
Source: NOAA

== Population ==
In 1990, the population of Choma was 30,143. In 2000, there were 40,405 people. The 2010 population census and household survey enumerated the population of the town at 51,842 inhabitants. The table below illustrates the same data.

Historical population
Year	Pop.	±%
1990	30,143	—
2000	40,405	+34.0%
2010	51,842	+28.3%

== Education ==
Choma has a range of both state-funded and private schools. Some of the state funded schools include: 1. Choma Day Secondary School, a mission school 2. Choma Secondary School, another mission school 3. Chuundu Day Secondary School 4. Batoka Secondary School 5. Masuku Secondary School, a mission school 6. Macha Girls' Secondary School, another mission school 7. Njase Girls' Secondary School, a mission school 8. St. Mark's Boys' Secondary School, a mission school 9. Swan Comprehensive School 10. St. Frances Davidson Day Secondary School, a mission school and 11.St Mulumba's Special School, named after the Ugandan Saint Matiya Mulumba.

In 2016, the Government of Zambia indicated intentions to construct a public university in Choma, once suitable land is located.

== Culture and lifestyle ==
Choma Museum and Crafts Centre on the Lusaka–Livingstone road in the centre of town is dedicated to the cultural heritage of the Tonga people of southern Zambia.

Choma has a variety of restaurants, cafes and street food stalls within the gardens of Choma Museum. The main market, Makalanguzu, also sells ingredients and traditional street food, including fish, grains, tobacco leaves and roasted corn.

Choma is home to a number of bars and nightclubs which have hosted notable Zambian artists including Macky 2, Petersen Zagaze and Mampi.

== International presence ==
From 2012 to 2017, Choma hosted successive teams of Voluntary Service Overseas (VSO) youth volunteers working in the areas of health, education and environment.

== Notable people ==
- Gilbert Choombe, Zambian Olympic boxer
- Emmanuel Zulu, Zambian soccer player
- Jonah Buyoya, Journalist
- Spencer Sautu, soccer player who plays for the Choma-based Green Eagles F.C.
- Rusty Markham, Zimbabwean Politician

== See also ==
- Zambia
- Climate of Zambia
- Railway stations in Zambia
