= Copperbelt Museum =

Museum in Zambia

Coordinates: 12°58′12″S 28°39′03″E

The Copperbelt Museum
- Location: Ndola, Zambia

The Copperbelt Museum is a living museum located in Ndola, Zambia.
