= Pemba District =

Coordinates: 16°40′S 27°23′E

- District
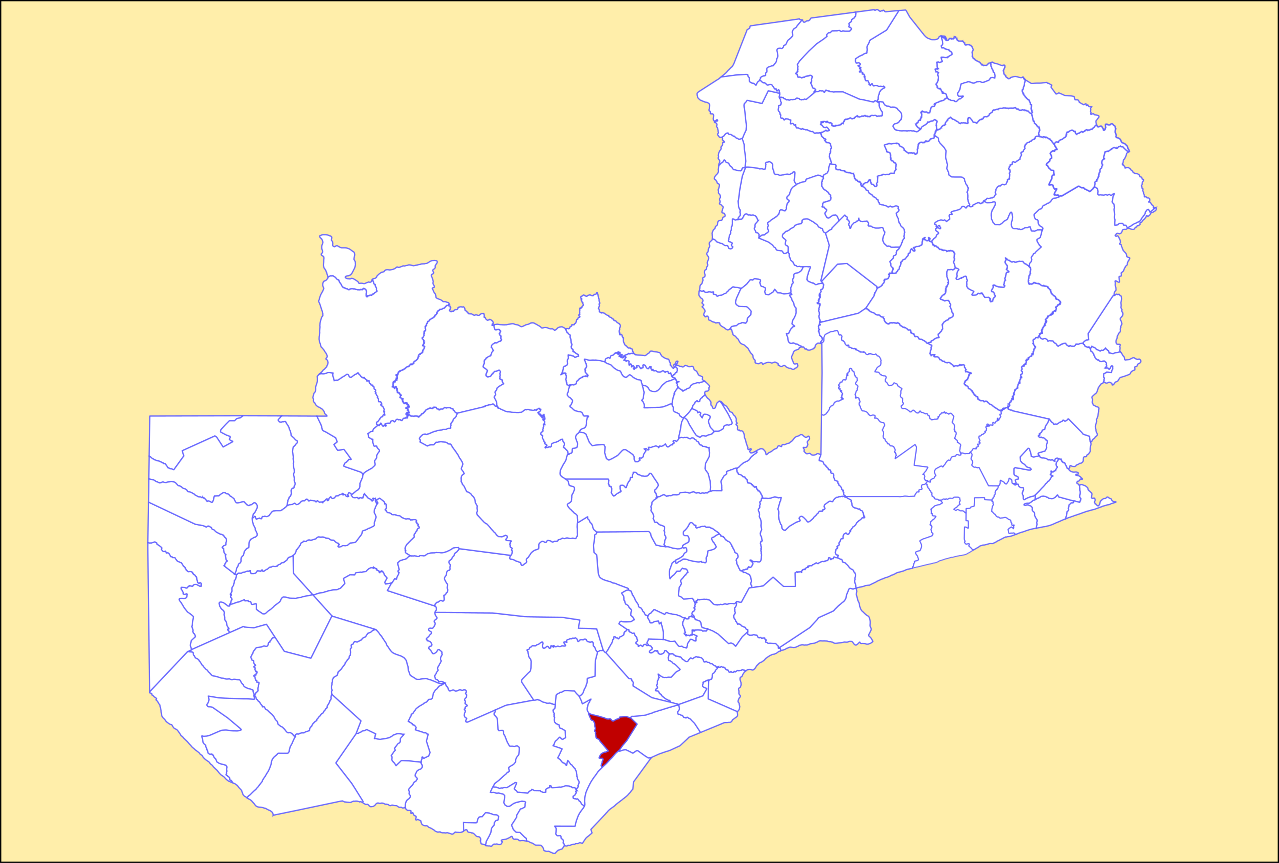
- District location in Zambia
- Country: Zambia
- Province: Southern Province

Area
  - Total: 1,887.2 km^{2} (728.7 sq mi)

Population (2022)
  - Total: 101,021
  - Density: 53.530/km^{2} (138.64/sq mi)
- Time zone: UTC+2 (CAT)

Pemba District is a district of Southern Province, Zambia. The district capital is Pemba. It was separated from Choma District in 2012. As of the 2022 Zambian Census, the district had a population of 101,021 people.
