= Namwala =

- Town
- Location within Zambia
- Coordinates: 15°45′S 26°26′E
- Country: Zambia
- Province: Southern
- District: Namwala
- Elevation: 996 m (3,268 ft)

Namwala is a town and the seat of Namwala District in Southern Province of Zambia. It is on the M11 road. Namwala town has a population of over 5,000 people. It lies on the southern bank of the Kafue River at 996 metres above sea level. It houses the administrative offices of Namwala District and is the principal town of the Ila people who inhabit the district.
