= Kalomo =

- Town
- Location within Zambia
- Coordinates: 17°03′00″S 26°30′00″E
- Country: Zambia
- Province: Southern Province
- District: Kalomo District
- Time zone: UTC+2 (CAT)

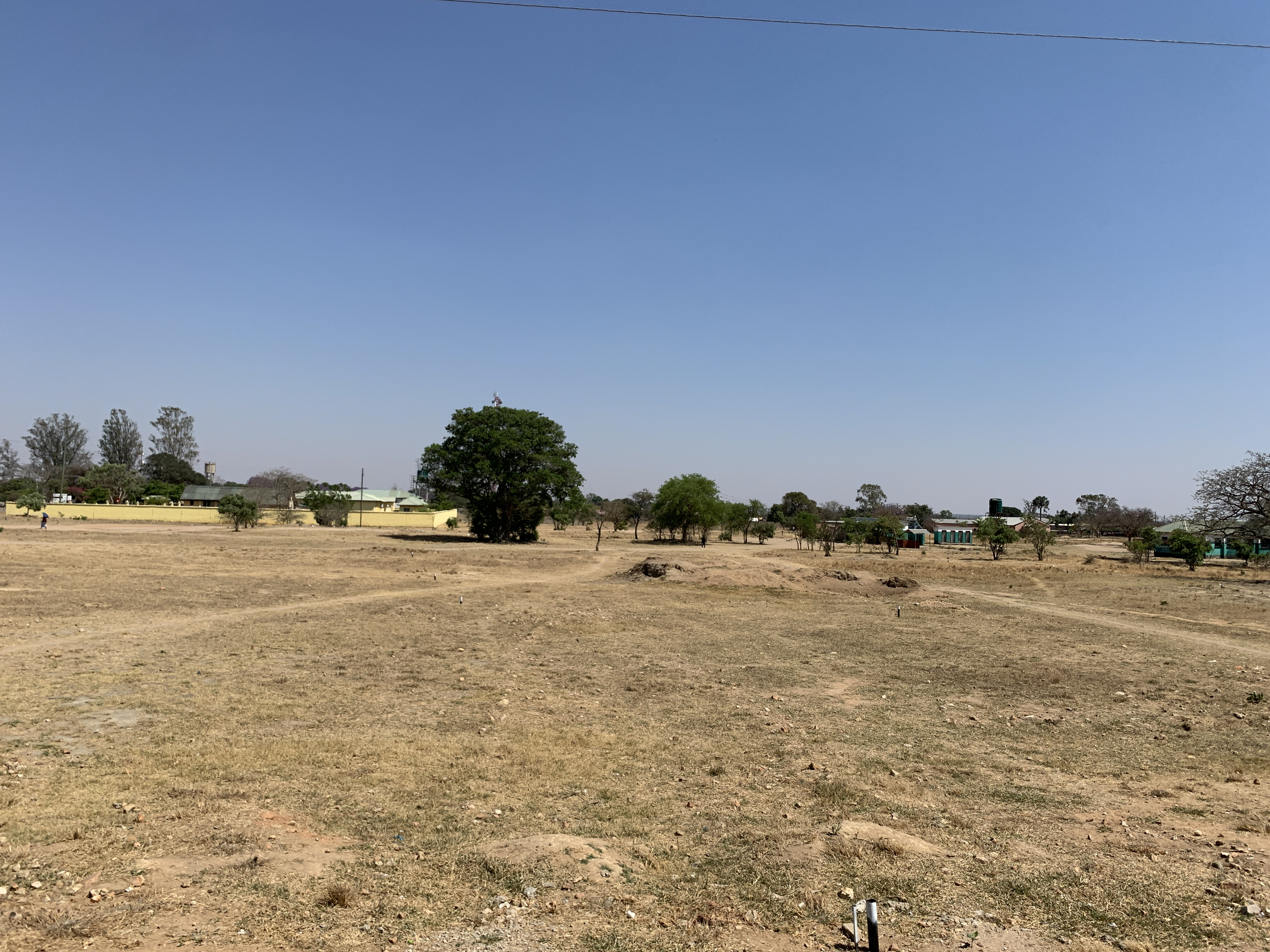
Kalomo

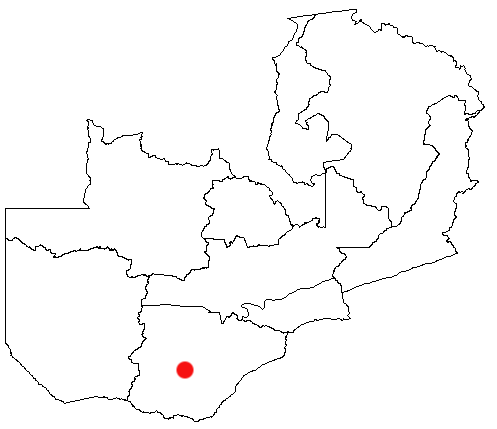
Location of Kalomo in Zambia

Kalomo is a town in southern Zambia, lying 125 km north east of Livingstone, on the main road (T1) and railway line to Lusaka. It is home to the Batonga people. It was the first administrative centre of Northern Rhodesia (specifically North-Western Rhodesia), serving until the capital city was established at Livingstone in 1907. The Administrator's House still survives from this era. It is the capital of the Kalomo District.

Kalundu Mound, site of a village from at least the ninth century until the twelfth century, lies near the town.

Additionally, Kalomo is home to the Namwianga Mission.

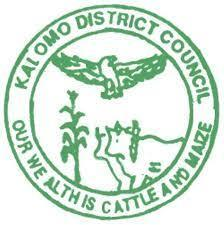
coat of arms
