= Chikankata District =

Coordinates: 16°02′S 28°14′E

- District
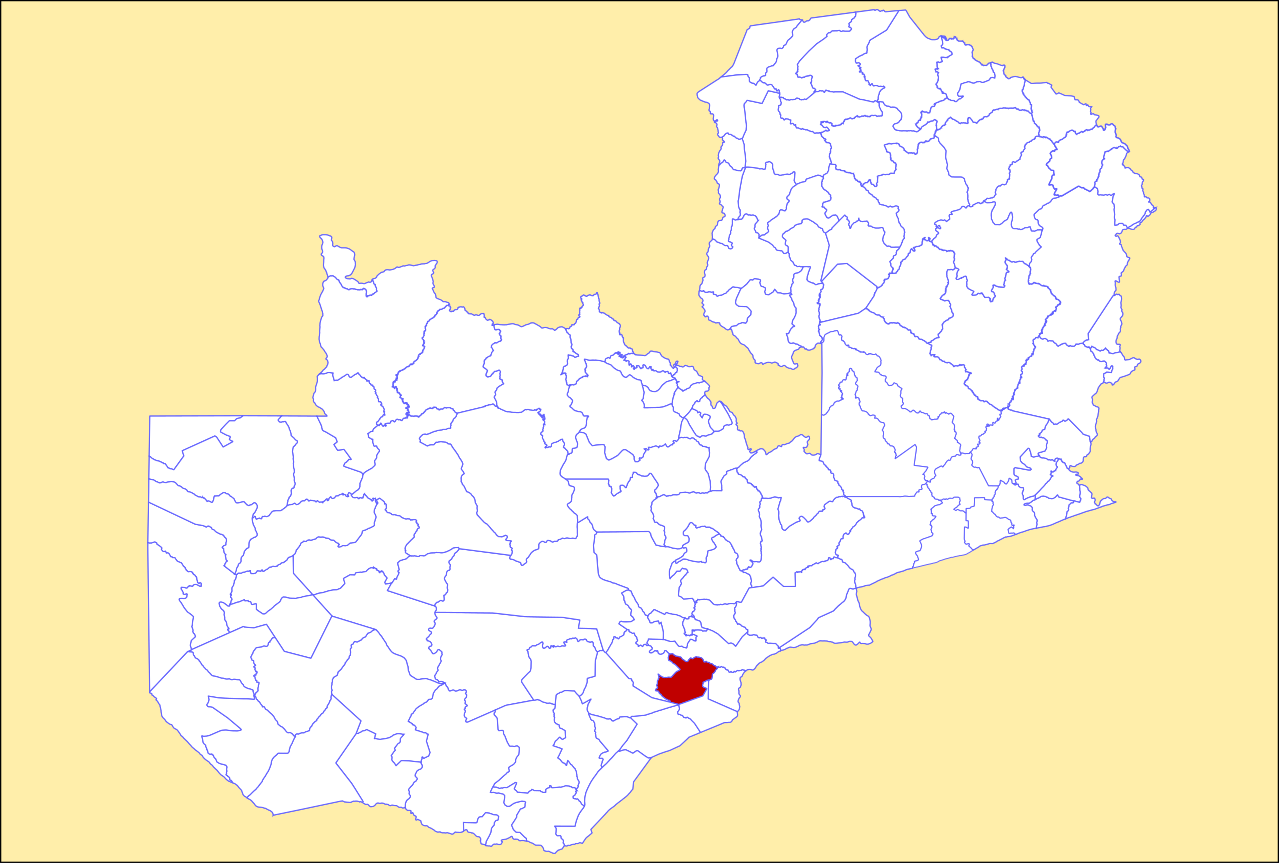
- District location in Zambia
- Country: Zambia
- Province: Southern Province

Area
  - Total: 2,673.3 km^{2} (1,032.2 sq mi)

Population (2022)
  - Total: 98,671
  - Density: 36.910/km^{2} (95.596/sq mi)
- Time zone: UTC+2 (CAT)

Chikankata District is a district of Southern Province, Zambia. It was separated from Mazabuka District in December 2011. As of the 2022 Zambian Census, the district had a population of 98,671 people.
