= Pemba (chalk) =

Chalk used in Afro-Brazilian religions

Pemba is a tapered, round-shaped piece of chalk made of limestone that may have different colors, used ritualistically in Afro-Brazilian religions such as Candomblé, Umbanda, Quimbanda and Quiumbanda.

Its main function in rituals is for the writing of the crossed out point. Being a sacred spelling, it may have different geometric shapes and traces, which represents a certain phalanx of spirits or guide.

In Candomblé, the points are referred to the different orishas that are worshiped. The powder has use for energy cleansing and protection rituals.
