= Kalomo District =

Coordinates: 17°00′S 26°05′E

- District
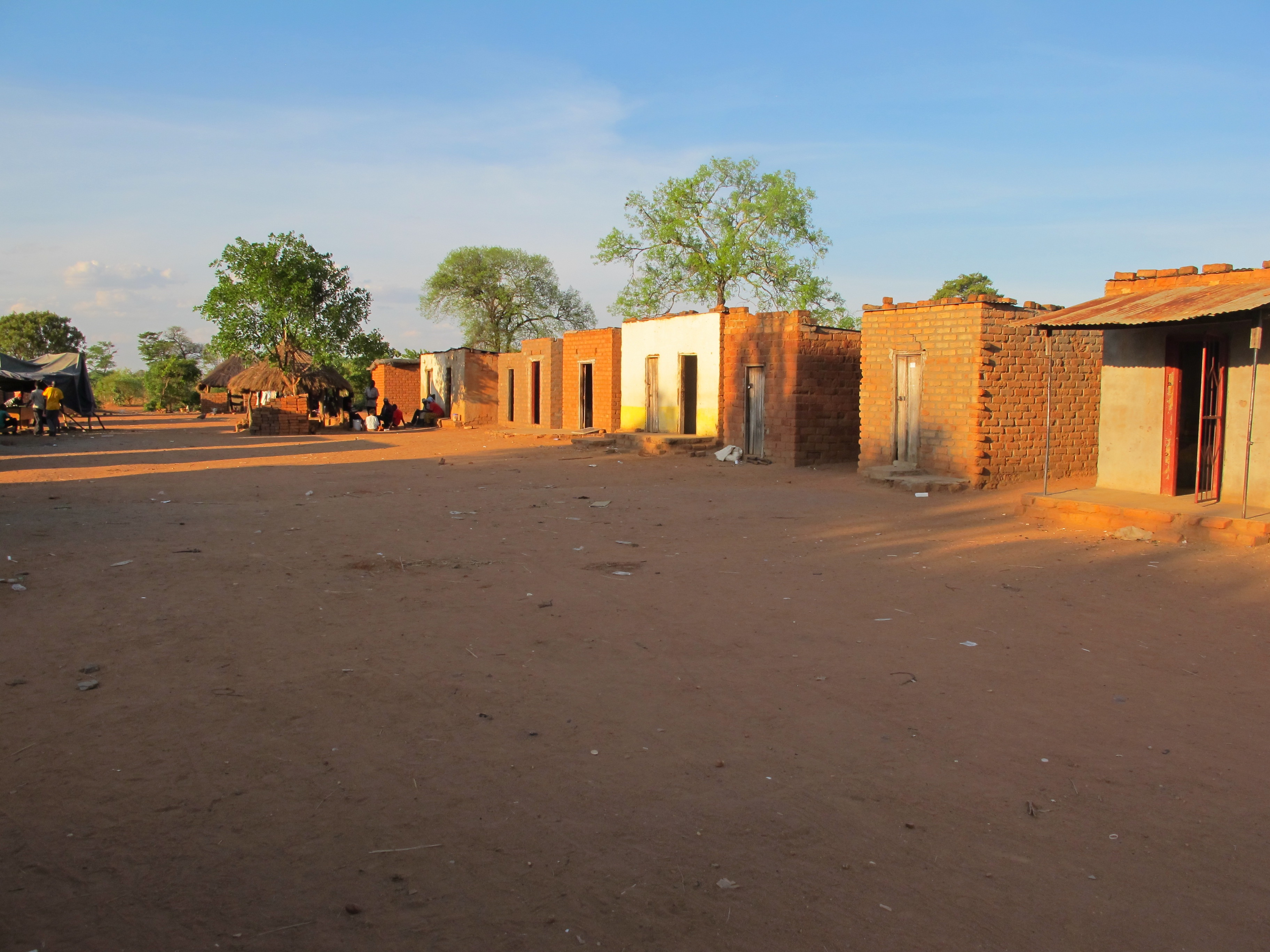
- Bilibili village, Kalomo District

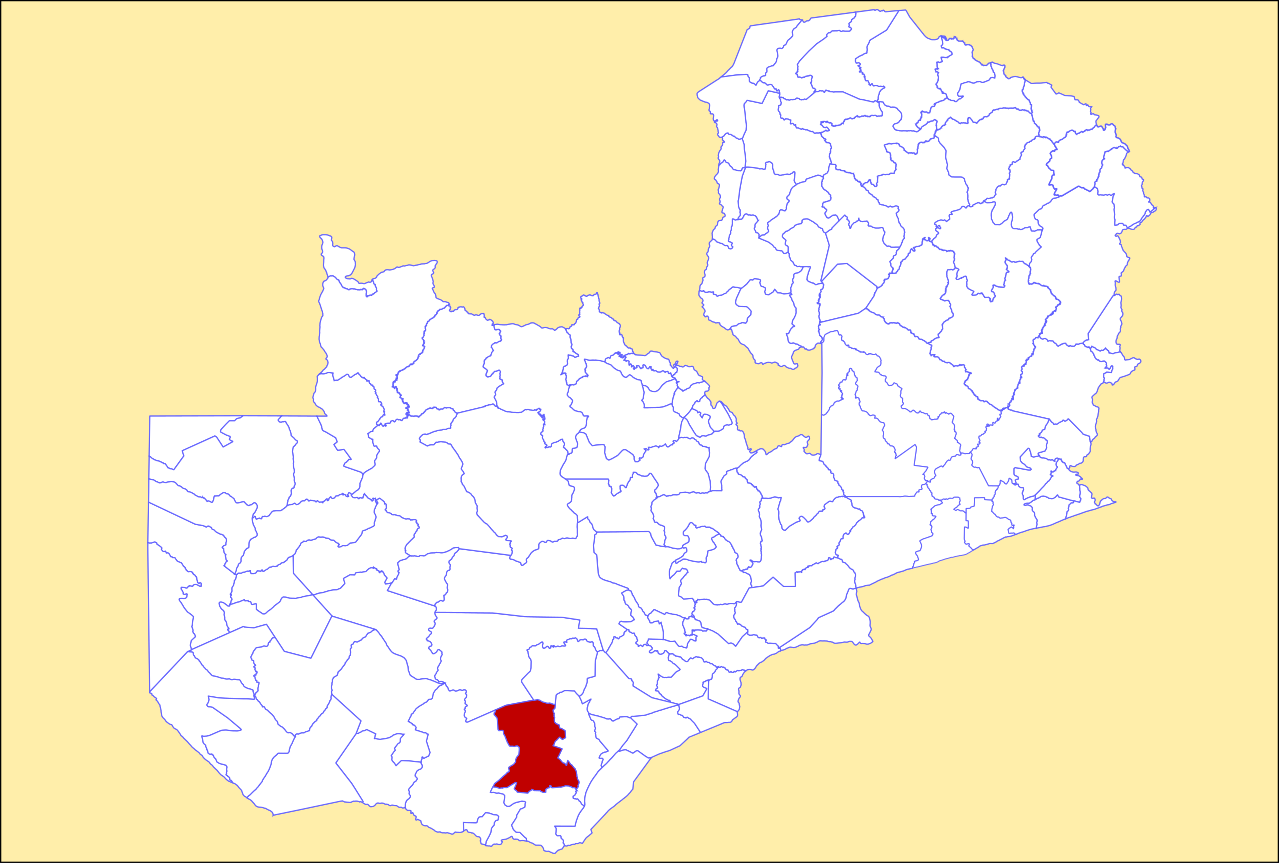
- District location in Zambia
- Country: Zambia
- Province: Southern Province
- Capital: Kalomo

Area
  - Total: 8,381.6 km^{2} (3,236.2 sq mi)

Population (2022)
  - Total: 274,640
  - Density: 32.767/km^{2} (84.866/sq mi)
- Time zone: UTC+2 (CAT)

Kalomo District is a district of Zambia, located in Southern Province. The capital lies at Kalomo. As of the 2022 Zambian census, the district had a population of 274,640 people.

It is made up of two constituencies, namely Kalomo Central and Dundumwenzi.
