= Victoria Falls Field Museum =

Museum in Victoria Falls, Zambia

The Victoria Falls Field Museum is a museum located along the Zambezi River in Victoria Falls, Zambia. It has displays relating to the history of the region, and to the formation of the falls.
