= Namwala District =

Coordinates: 15.7519°S 26.4444°E

- District
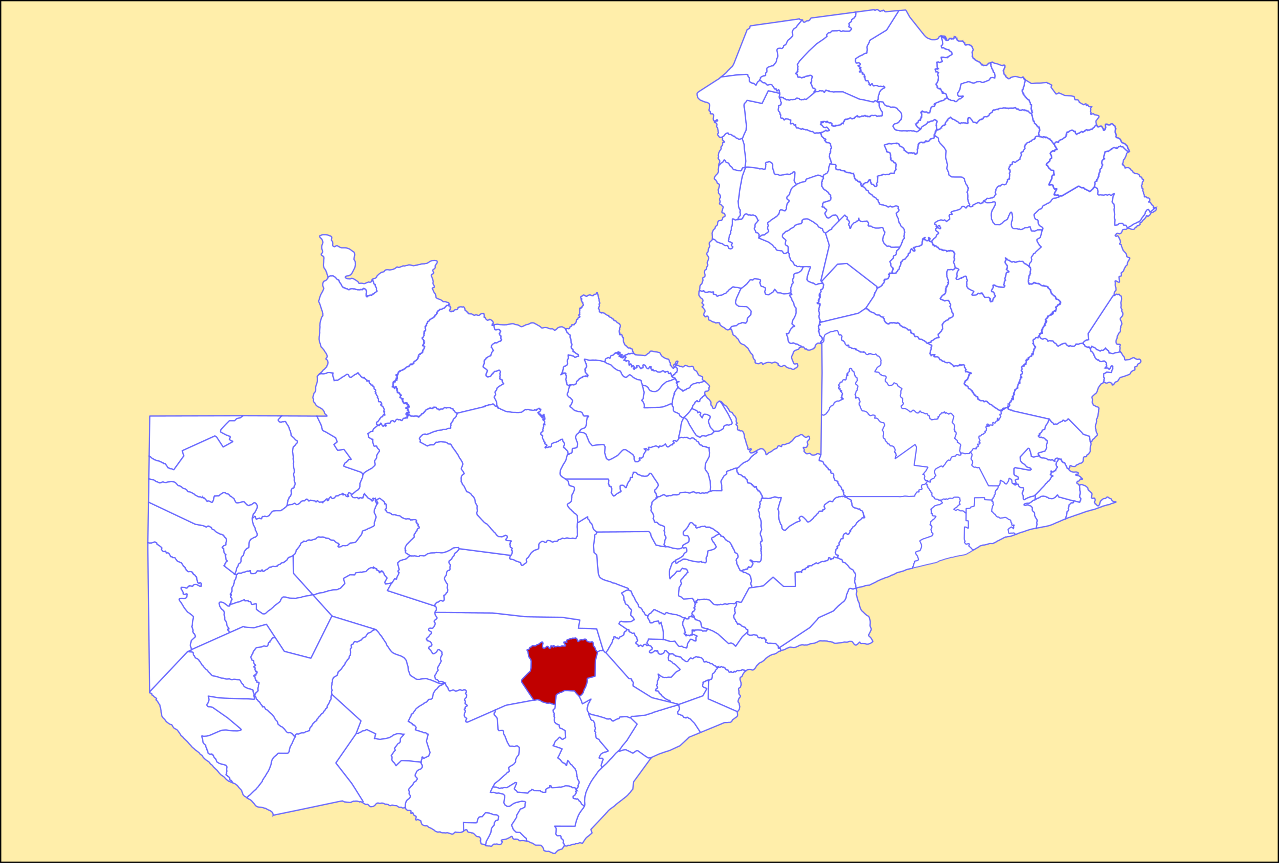
- District location in Zambia
- Country: Zambia
- Province: Southern Province
- Capital: Namwala

Area
  - Total: 5,678.4 km^{2} (2,192.4 sq mi)

Population (2022)
  - Total: 167,938
  - Density: 29.575/km^{2} (76.599/sq mi)
- Time zone: UTC+2 (CAT)

Namwala District is a district of Zambia, located in Southern Province. The capital lies at Namwala. As of the 2022 Zambian Census, the district had a population of 167,938 people.

== Geography ==
Namwala covers an area of approximately 10,000 square kilometers. Namwala town has a population of over 5,000 people. It lies on the southern bank of the Kafue River at 996 metres above sea level. It houses the administrative offices of Namwala District and is the principal town of the Ila people who inhabit the district. They are famous for their large herds of cattle with livestock farming, not surprisingly, their main economic activity. Other major settlement areas in the district are Kabulamwanda, Muchila, Maala, Mbeza and Chitongo.

== Culture ==
The district is also well known for, its Shimunenga traditional ceremony. This spectacular event that takes place around September/October of every year at Maala village. The Ila people, the traditional inhabitants of Namwala District, engage mostly in cattle herding, fishing, hunting and subsistence farming. As a symbol of prestige, the traditional Ila do not routinely eat their cattle.. However, drought and disease have affected the cattle population.

The Ila are closely related in language and culture to their more numerous Tonga neighbours in Southern Province. The Ila speaking people of Zambia reside mainly in the administrative districts of Namwala, Itezhi-Tezhi and Mumbwa spread over seventeen chiefdoms.
