= Tonga people (Zambia and Zimbabwe) =

Ethnic group of Zambia, Zimbabwe, and Mozambique

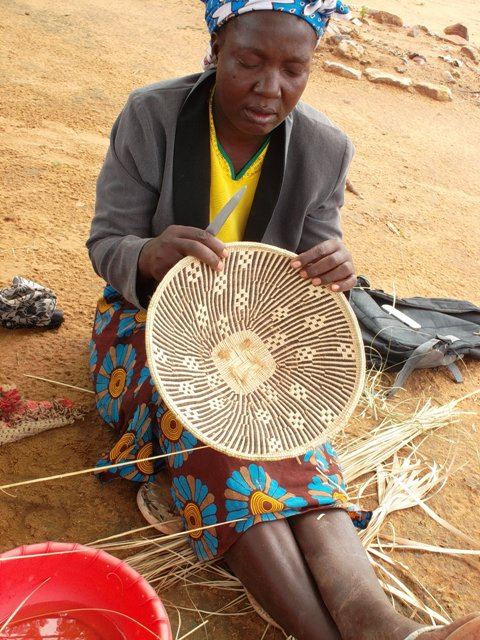
A Tonga woman working on a decorative wall basket in Zimbabwe.

The Tonga people of Zambia and Zimbabwe are a Bantu ethnic group of southern Zambia and northern Zimbabwe. They are related to the Batoka who are part of the Tokaleya people in the same area, but not to the Tonga people of Malawi who belong to a larger Tumbuka people group who speak a dialect of Chitumbuka, called Chitonga. In southern Zambia, they are patrons of the Kafue Twa.

Lwiindi is an annual festival of the Tonga people of southern Zambia. It is a thanksgiving ceremony to appease the gods for the good rains and harvest. It is held in early July.

== The Tonga of Zimbabwe ==
The Tonga people of Zimbabwe are found in and around the Binga District, the Kariba area, and other parts of Matabeleland. They number up to 300,000 and are mostly subsistence farmers. The Tonga also survive by fishing from the Zambezi River. ln Zimbabwe, the language of the Tonga people is called tchitonga.

The Tonga People were settled along Lake Kariba after the construction of the Kariba Dam wall. They stretch from Chirundu, Kariba town, Mola, Binga to Victoria Falls.

In the 1800s, during the reign of Mzilikazi and Lobengula, the Tonga people were regarded by the Ndebele (at the time called the "Matabele") as very peaceful.

== Languages ==
The Tonga language of Zambia is spoken by about 1.38 million people in Zambia and 137,000 in Zimbabwe. (The Malawian Tonga language which is a dialect of Chitumbuka is classified in a different zone of the Bantu languages.)

== Notable Tonga People of Zambia ==
- Hakainde Hichilema
- Anderson Mazoka
- Hon. Gary Nkombo
- Hon. Cornelius Mweetwa
- Hantobolo
- Ng'andu Peter Magande
- Chaloka Beyani

== See also ==
- Choma Museum and Crafts Project
