= Southern Province, Zambia =

Province of Zambia

Southern
- Province
- Map of Zambia showing the Southern Province

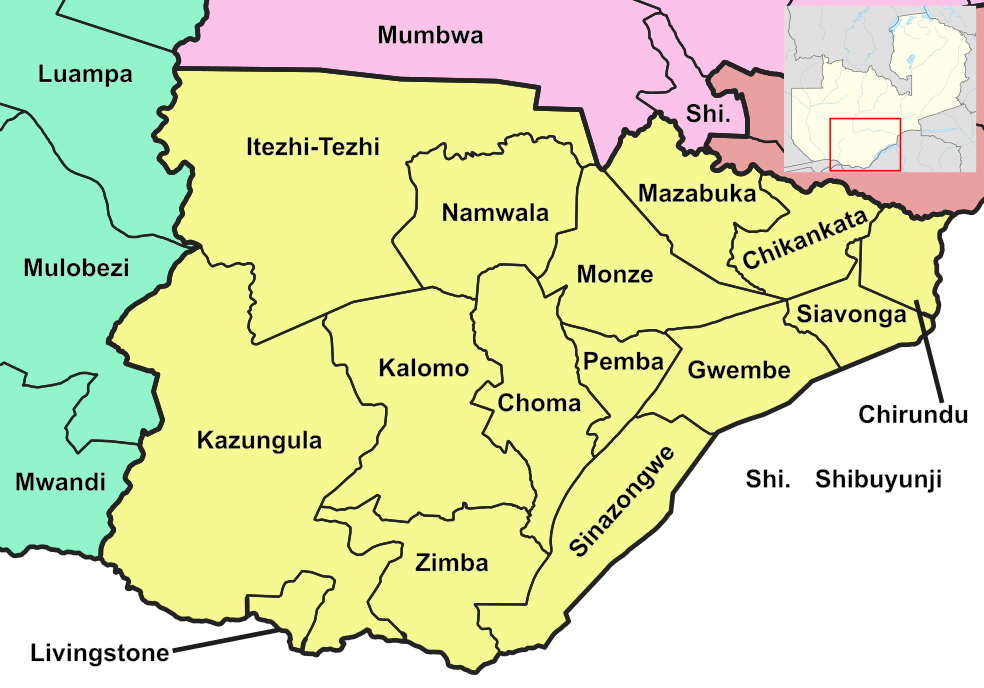
- Map of Zambia showing the Southern Province with its districts
- Coordinates: 16°30′S 27°00′E
- Country: Zambia
- Capital: Choma
- Districts: Chikankata District; Chirundu District; Choma District; Gwembe District; Itezhi-Tezhi District; Kalomo District; Kazungula District; Livingstone District; Mazabuka District; Monze District; Namwala District; Pemba District; Siavonga District; Sinazongwe District; Zimba District

Government
  - Type: Provincial Administration
  - Provincial Minister: Credo Nanjuwa

Area
  - Total: 85,823 km^{2} (33,136 sq mi)

Population (2022 census)
  - Total: 2,388,093
  - Density: 27.826/km^{2} (72.068/sq mi)
- Time zone: UTC+2
- ISO 3166 code: ZM-07
- HDI (2018): 0.589 medium · 4th
- Website: www.sou.gov.zm

Southern Province is one of Zambia's ten provinces. It is home to Zambia's premier tourist attraction, Mosi-oa-Tunya (Victoria Falls), shared with Zimbabwe. The centre of the province, the Southern Plateau, has the largest area of commercial farmland of any Zambian province, and produces most of the maize crop.

The Zambezi River is the province's southern border, and Lake Kariba, formed by the Kariba Dam, lies along the province's south-eastern edge. The eastern border is the Kariba Gorge and Zambezi, and the north-east border is the Kafue River, forming its border with Lusaka Province. The Kafue Flats lie mostly within the province's northern border with Central Province. In the north-west lies part of the famous Kafue National Park, the largest in Zambia. The south-western border with Western Province runs through the teak forests around Mulobezi which once supported a commercial timber industry and for which the Mulobezi Railway was built.

The provincial capital is Choma. Until 2011, the provincial capital was Livingstone City. The Batonga are the largest ethnic group in the Province. A rail line and the Lusaka-Livingstone road form the principal transport axis of the province, running through its centre and its farming towns: Kalomo, Choma, Pemba, Monze, and Mazabuka. In addition to maize, other commercially important activities include sugar cane plantations at the edge of the Kafue Flats, and cattle ranching.

Southern Province has the only large source of fossil fuel in Zambia, the Maamba coal mine in the Zambezi valley, served by a branch line of the railway.

== Geography ==
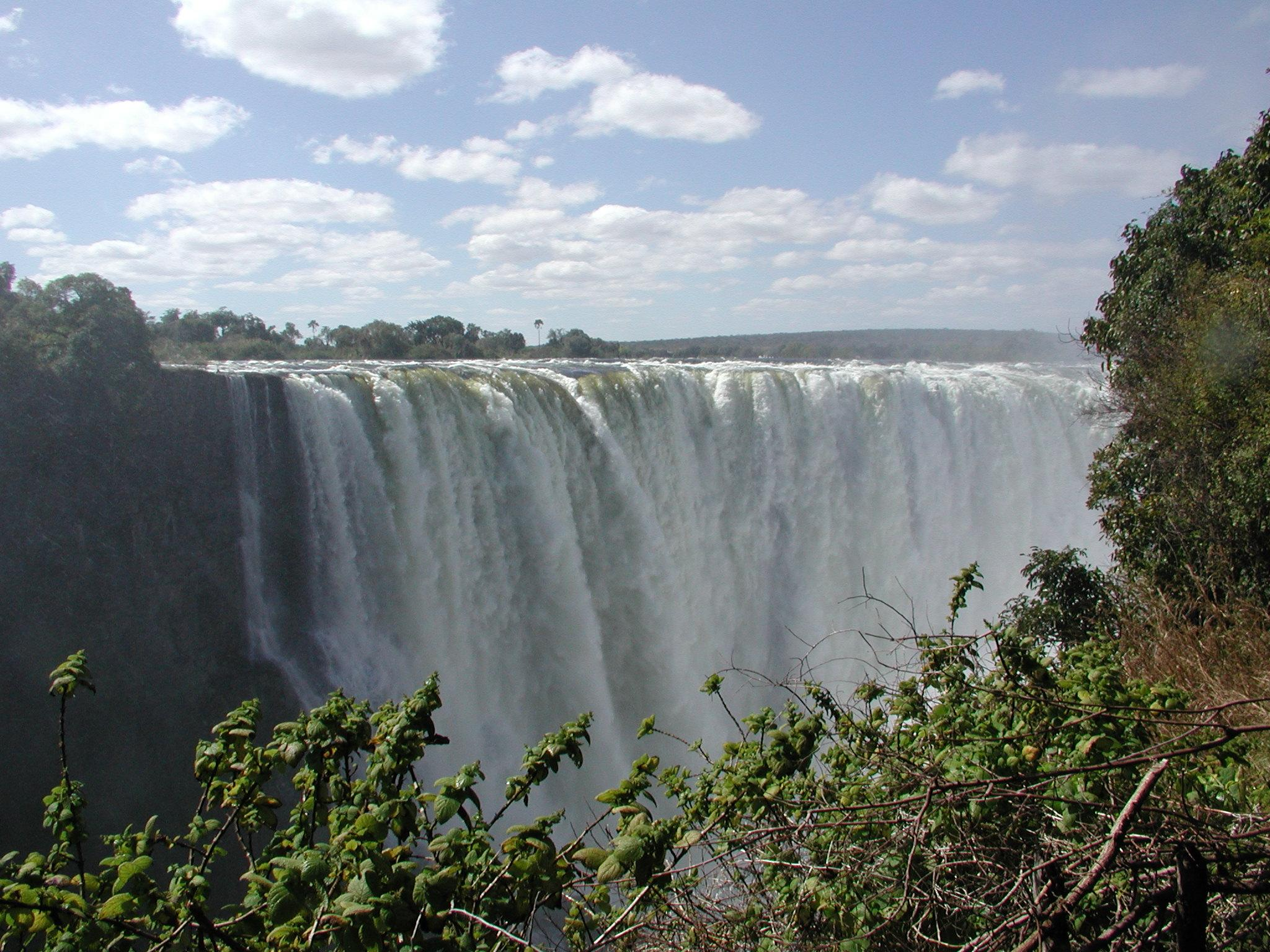
Victoria Falls

Southern Province is bordered along Zimbabwe in the south divided by Victoria Falls, Central in the north, Western Province in the west and Lusaka Province in the northeast. The general topography of the province is characterized by uplifted planation surfaces. The general elevation of the nation as a whole is tended towards West to East from the Kalahari Basin. The level of land falls from the upper Congo towards the Zambezi depression in the South forming a plateau.

The province lies in the watershed between DR Congo and Zambezi river systems. The province along with some of the other provinces in the country lies in the frontier formed between the continental divide separating the Atlantic Ocean and the Indian Ocean, which traverses from DR Congo to the south of Tanzania. There are three major seasons: a cool dry season from April to August, a hot dry season from August to November and a warm wet season from November to April. The maximum heat is experienced during November, while the maximum rainfall is received during December. The annual rainfall is more than 700 mm (28 in) in the region. Lake Kariba is the manmade lake in Africa and the second largest manmade lake in the world and it stretches along the Southern border of the province.

Climate data for Southern (Zambia)
Month	Jan	Feb	Mar	Apr	May	Jun	Jul	Aug	Sep	Oct	Nov	Dec	Year
Record high °C (°F)	30 (86)	29.7 (85.5)	30.3 (86.5)	29.9 (85.8)	28 (82)	25.6 (78.1)	25.5 (77.9)	28.4 (83.1)	32.5 (90.5)	34 (93)	32.6 (90.7)	30.4 (86.7)	34 (93)
Mean daily maximum °C (°F)	23.6 (74.5)	23.2 (73.8)	23.1 (73.6)	21.9 (71.4)	18.9 (66.0)	16 (61)	16.1 (61.0)	19.3 (66.7)	23.9 (75.0)	26.2 (79.2)	25.1 (77.2)	23.6 (74.5)	26.2 (79.2)
Mean daily minimum °C (°F)	18.9 (66.0)	18.6 (65.5)	17.6 (63.7)	14.8 (58.6)	10.1 (50.2)	6.7 (44.1)	6.3 (43.3)	9.2 (48.6)	14.2 (57.6)	18.2 (64.8)	19.1 (66.4)	18.9 (66.0)	6.3 (43.3)
Average precipitation mm (inches)	201 (7.9)	160 (6.3)	105 (4.1)	31 (1.2)	4 (0.2)	1 (0.0)	1 (0.0)	0 (0)	2 (0.1)	16 (0.6)	93 (3.7)	185 (7.3)	799 (31.5)
Source 1:
Source 2:

== Demographics ==
Historical population
Year	Pop.	±%
1964	466,000	—
1969	496,000	+6.4%
1980	1,134,592	+128.7%
1990	1,178,185	+3.8%
2000	1,212,124	+2.9%
2010	1,589,926	+31.2%
2022	2,388,093	+50.2%
Sources: 1964–69: 1980–2000: 2010:

As per the 2010 Zambian census, Southern Province had a population of 1,589,926 accounting to 12.08% of the total Zambian population of 13,092,666. There were 779,659 males and 810,267 females, making the sex ratio to 1,039 for every 1,000 males, compared to the national average of 1,028. The literacy rate stood at 71.20% against a national average of 70.2%. The rural population constituted 75.33%, while the urban population was 24.67%. The total area of the province was 85,283 km^{2} and the population density was 18.60 per km^{2}. The population density during 2000 Zambian census stood at 18.60. The decadal population growth of the province was 2.80%. The median age in the province at the time of marriage was 20.6. The average household size was 5.4, with the families headed by females being 4.6 and 5.7 for families headed by men. The total eligible voters in the province was 64.10%. The unemployment rate of the province was 12.10%. The total fertility rate was 6.1, complete birth rate was 6.2, crude birth rate was 37.0, child women population at birth was 807, general fertility rate was 160, gross reproduction rate was 2.5 and net reproduction rate was 1.8. The total labour force constituted 55.00% of the total population. Out of the labour force, 64.1% were men and 46.7% women. The annual growth rate of labour force was 4.4%. Tonga was the most spoken language with 74.70% speaking it. The total population in the province with the condition stood at 3,068. The life expectancy at birth stood at 56 compared to the national average of 51.

== Economy and agriculture ==
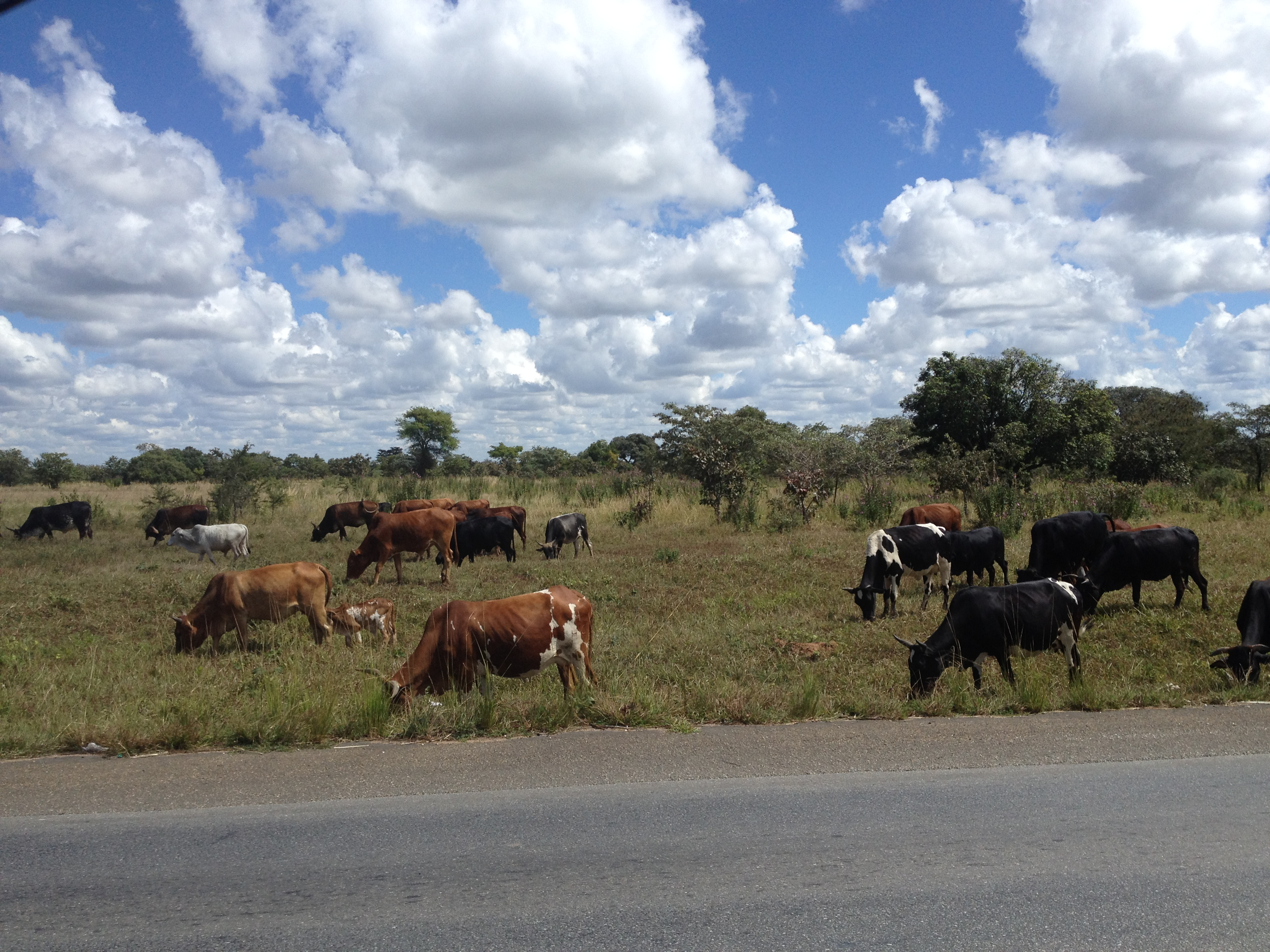
Cattle near Chisekesi.

HIV infected & AIDS deaths
Year	HIV infected	AIDS deaths
1985	23,960	107
1990	65,467	3,690
1995	103,202	8,397
2000	117,477	11,379
2005	120,672	12,578
2010	117,471	12,403

Agriculture is the primary economic activity in Southern Province with a mix of small holder and commercial maize farms across the province. Compared to other major agricultural regions, such as Eastern Province, Southern Province has more abundant land and access to water, but receives less rainfall. Southern Province is also home to the "Sweetest Town in Zambia", Mazabuka, where sugarcane farming and sugar processing are a major business. The total area of crops planted during the year 2014 in the province was 360,160.32 hectares which constituted 18.98% of the total area cultivated in Zambia. The net production stood at 688,122 metric tonnes, which formed 16.89% of the total agricultural production in the country. Sorghum was the major crop in the province with 4,695 metric tonnes, constituting 40.62% of the national output.

Mazabuka grows 90% of sugar grown in Zambia with an estimated 430 tons produced annually. Sugarcane fields in Mazabuka are among the most productive in the world by hectare and low production costs allow production to compete on international markets. Around 60% of sugar is exported to Europe and other markets. However, the export industry is limited due to high transport costs linking processed sugar to export markets. Nationally, the sugar industry in Mazabuka contributes to around 4% of GDP each year.

The sugar industry in Mazabuka made international news in 2013 when it was discovered that Zambia Sugar, the biggest sugar company in the country, had paid nothing in corporate taxes to Zambia in the previous 5 years.

Southern Province and Eastern Province are the two primary breadbaskets of Zambia. Southern Province produces more than 600,000 metric tons of maize each year from a combination of commercial, which are unique to Southern Province, and smallholder farms. Despite poor rains in recent years and a strong El Nino weather cycle in 2016, Zambian maize output has been predicted to continue to grow. Growth in Southern Province and across the country has allowed Zambia to remain a net-exporter of maize to food insecure neighboring countries, such as Zimbabwe and Malawi which have been hit more severely by the weather.

== Education, employment, and health ==
As of 2004, the province had 995 basic schools, 45 high schools and the number of school children out of school in ages between 7 and 15 stood at 995. The unemployment rate was 7 per cent and the general unemployment rate for youth stood at 6 per cent as of 2008. The province had 50 doctors as of 2005. There were 344 Malaria incidence for every 1,000 people in the province as of 2005 and there were 12,403 AIDS death as of 2010.

== National parks and culture ==
The former provincial capital of Southern Province, Livingstone, is Zambia's tourism hub and home to international tourist attraction Mosi-Oa-Tunya (Victoria Falls). Situated across the Zambezi River from Victoria Falls Town, Zimbabwe, Livingstone competes to be a jumping off point for tourism to the region that includes other attractions such as Lochinvar National Park and the Kafue Flats in the north, the Zambezi and Batoka Gorges in the south, Chobe National Park in Botswana, Kafue National Park in Zambia, and Lake Kariba on the Zimbabwe border. Tourism is a large and growing part of the Zambian economy, contributing to 7% of GDP in 2005 and receiving more than 800,000 visitors per annum by 2007.

The Lwiindi Gonde festival celebrated in Monze District by Tonga tribe during July, Maliko Malindi Lwiindi festival celebrated in Sinazongwe District by Tonga tribe during August, Musumu Muyumu festival celebrated in Kalomo District by Tonga tribe during August, Sikaumba festival celebrated in Namwala District by Ila tribe during August, Lukuni Luzwa Buuka festival celebrated in Kalomo District by Toka Leya tribe during August, Kasanga Makonda festival celebrated in Kazungula District by Nkoya tribe during September, Guta Bweenza Bwe festival celebrated in Kazungula District by Tonga tribe during September, Shimunenga festival celebrated in Namwala District by Ila tribe during October, Chungu festival celebrated in Kalomo District by Tonga tribe during October, Maanzi Aabila Lwiindi festival celebrated in Kalomo District by Tonga tribe during October, Lwiindi Sekute festival celebrated in Kazungula District by Toka Leya tribe during October, Bagande festival celebrated in Siavonga District by Tonga tribe during November, Koombaze Kamakonde festival celebrated in Kalomo District by Tonga tribe during November, Bene Mukuni festival celebrated in Kazungula District by Toka Leya tribe during July & December are the major festivals celebrated in the Province.

== Administration ==
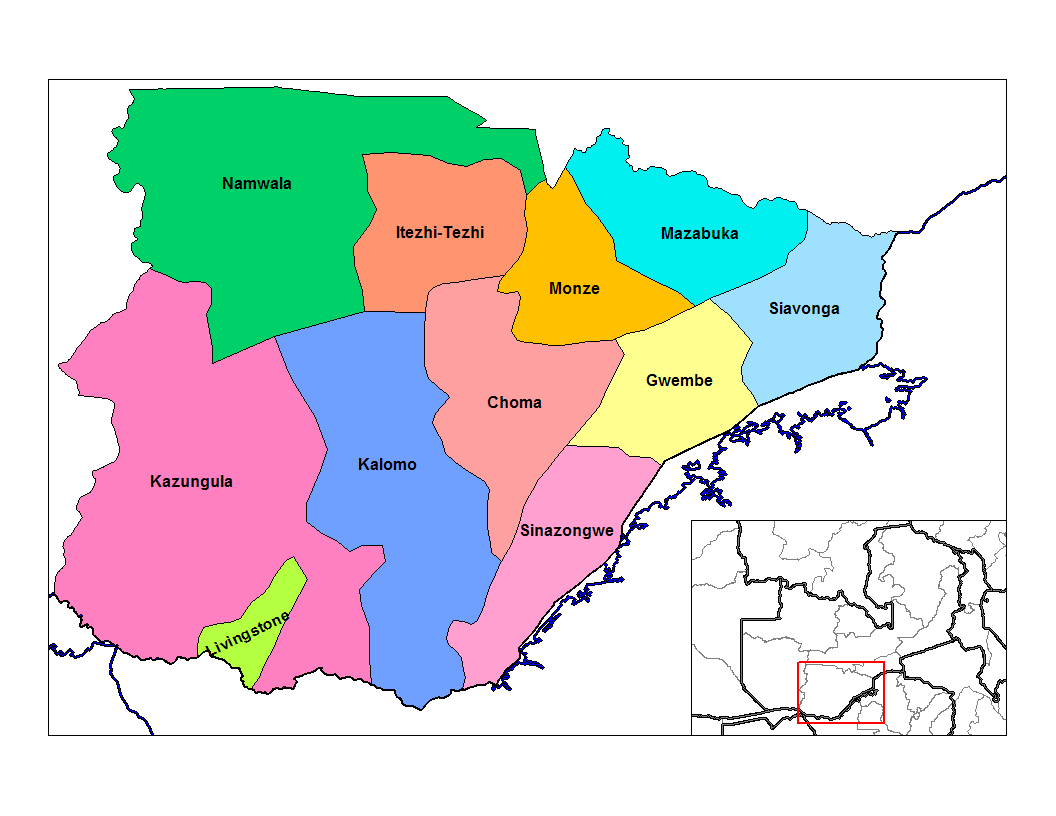
Districts of Southern Zambia before 2012

Profession	% of working population
Agriculture, Forestry & Fishing (by Industry)	11.80
Community, Social and Personnel	9.50
Construction	11.40
Electricity, Gas, and water	11.40
Financial & Insurance	9.70
Hotels and Restaurants	20.20
Manufacturing	8.50
Mining & Quarrying	3.20
Transportation and Storage	9.00
Wholesale & Retail Trade	10.40

Provincial administration is set up purely for administrative purposes. The province is headed by a minister appointed by the President and there are ministries of central government for each province. The administrative head of the province is the Permanent Secretary, appointed by the President. There is a Deputy Permanent Secretary, heads of government departments and civil servants at the provincial level. Southern Province is divided into fifteen districts, namely, Chikankata District, Chirundu District, Choma District, Gwembe District, Itezhi-Tezhi District, Kalomo District, Kazungula District, Livingstone District, Mazabuka District, Monze District, Namwala District, Pemba District, Siavonga District, Sinazongwe District and Zimba District. All the district headquarters are the same as the district names. There are fifteen councils in the province, each of which is headed by an elected representative, called councilor. Each councilor holds office for three years. The administrative staff of the council is selected based on Local Government Service Commission from within or outside the district. The office of the provincial government is located in each of the district headquarters and has provincial local government officers and auditors. Each council is responsible for raising and collecting local taxes and the budgets of the council are audited and submitted every year after the annual budget. The elected members of the council do not draw salaries, but are paid allowances from the council. Southern is a predominantly rural district and hence there are no city or municipal councils. The government stipulates 63 different functions for the councils with the majority of them being infrastructure management and local administration. Councils are mandated to maintain each of their community centres, zoos, local parks, drainage system, playgrounds, cemeteries, caravan sites, libraries, museums and art galleries. They also work along with specific government departments for helping in agriculture, conservation of natural resources, postal service, establishing and maintaining hospitals, schools and colleges. The councils prepare schemes that encourage community participation.

== See also ==
- Bibliography of the history of Zambia

== General and cited references ==
- Summary report for the 2010 Census of population (PDF) (Report). Lusaka: Central Statistical Office, Republic of Zambia. 2012. Archived from the original (PDF) on 2015-10-26.
