= Faanya Rose =

American businesswoman, conservationist, philanthropist, and explorer (born 1938)

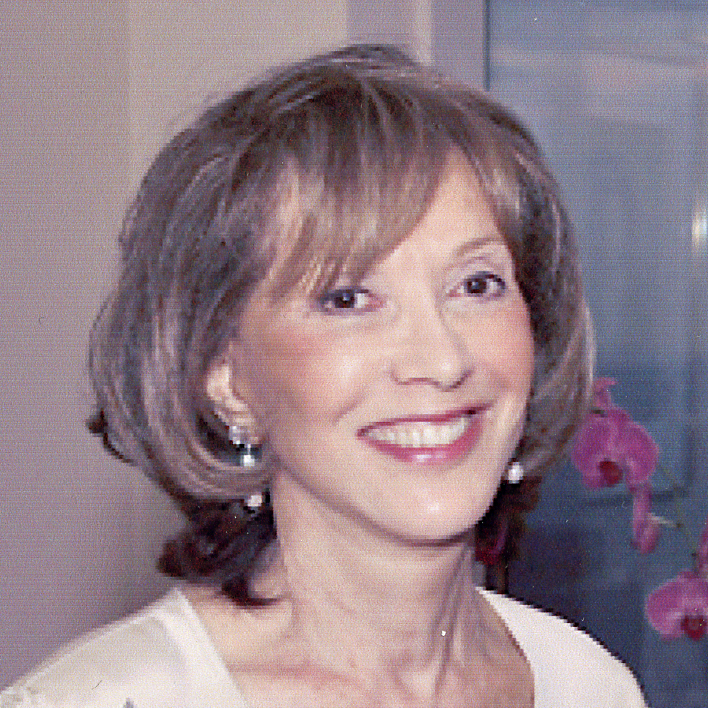
- Faanya Rose, New York, 2008.
- Born: July 9, 1938 (age 88); Johannesburg
- Other names: Faanya Goldin, Faanya Arch
- Citizenship: British-American
- Known for: First woman elected president of The Explorers Club
- Scientific career
- Fields: Exploration, Philanthropy; Conservation, Treasury management
- Workplaces: The Explorers Club, Fight for Sight (UK), BAA plc

Faanya Lydia (Arch) Rose (born July 9, 1938) is a British-American businesswoman, conservationist, philanthropist, and explorer. She was the first woman and the first British citizen elected president of The Explorers Club.

At founding in 1904, the membership of the Explorer Club was "limited absolutely to men who [had] been in the open and the wild places of the earth." Women were not admitted until 1981, and would wait nineteen years before being considered for president. Faanya said of her election she wanted, "Not to be the first woman president, but to be the first woman to be the best man for the job."

== Birth and education ==
Rose was born in Johannesburg when South Africa was a dominion of Great Britain. She is the oldest child of Cecilia "Cissie" Elizabeth Arch (née Wainer) (1909–1978) and Simon Arch (1910–1977), a diamond merchant and financier.

She is Jewish, of Eastern European descent, her family emigrating from the Pale of Settlement in the first half of the twentieth century for South Africa. Her father left Berdychiv, Ukraine, with his family as a boy for Berlin, and when Nazism became ascendant in Germany, immigrated to Johannesburg. Her mother's family arrived in Johannesburg from the Poswol region of Lithuania.

Rose attended Johannesburg Girls Preparatory School of Barnato Park, in her time a school for young ladies. After graduation, she enrolled at University of the Witwatersrand. As an executive in London during the 1980s and 1990s, she pursued course work with the London Business School and the Association of Corporate Treasurers.

== Marriages and children ==
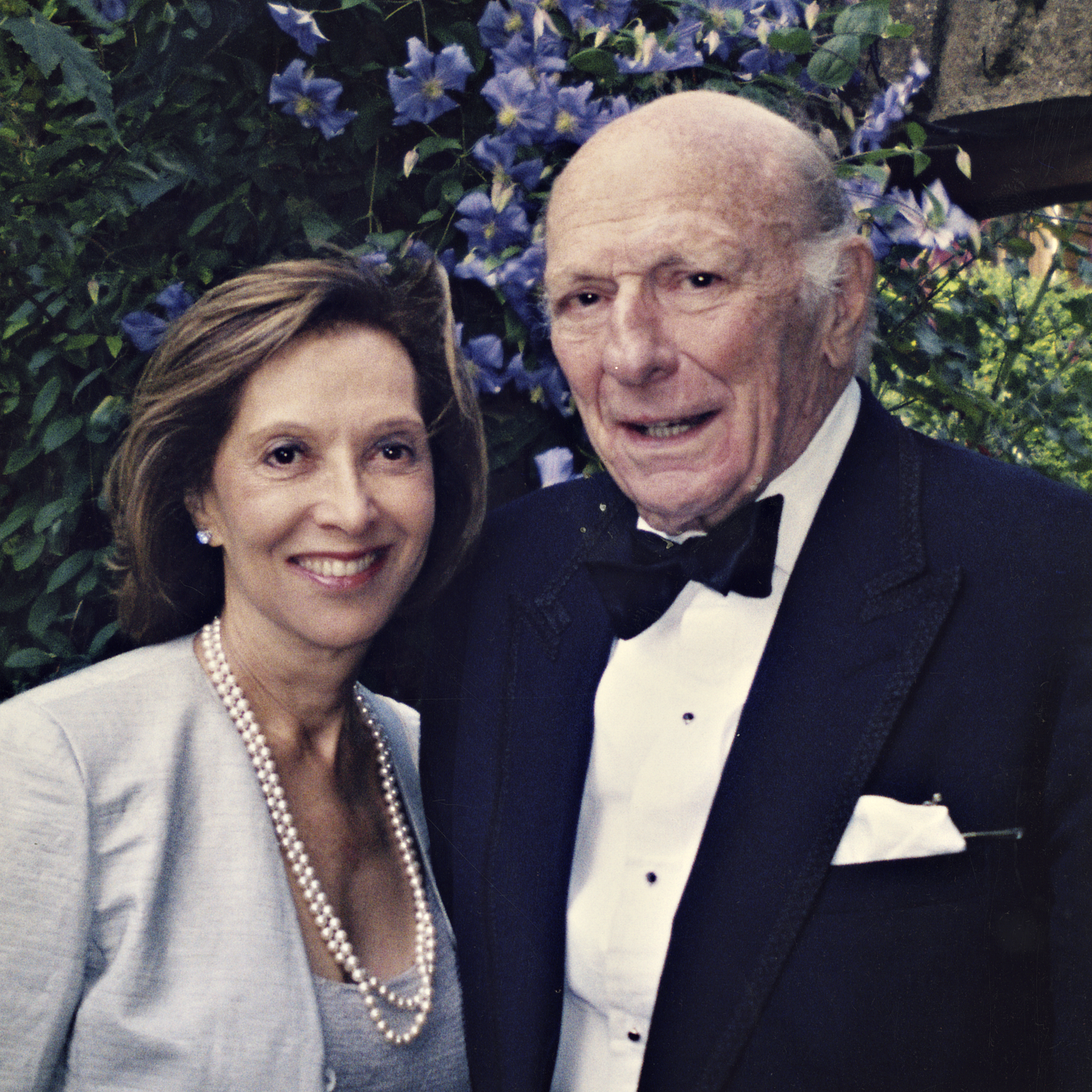
Faanya & Robert Rose – Oxford UK 1995

Rose was married in 1956 to South African Donald Goldin (1933–1979), an avid sportsman and businessman. They had three sons: Grant Joseph (born 1957), Malcolm Daniel (born 1961), and Andrew Saul (born 1972).

In 1965, Donald Goldin became general manager of the Victoria Falls Casino Hotel, and the family moved to Rhodesia. He became a naturalized Rhodesian citizen, and in the Rhodesian general election, 1977 he was elected a member of parliament, a voice in the Ian Smith government for greater black inclusion. He served less than his full term before dying at age 46 on Air Rhodesia Flight 827, a casualty of the Rhodesian Bush War.

Then Faanya met Robert Rose (1921–2009) in London in the early 1990s. He was a retired American entrepreneur, world traveler, and enthusiastic explorer. They married in 1993. Robert introduced his new wife to the Explorers Club by way of the club's British Chapter. During her marriage to Rose, she established dual citizenship with the United States and Britain. He died at age 88.

== Rhodesia ==
Business brought Faanya Rose to Rhodesia in 1965. Her father Simon Arch agreed to finance the first casino for the country to be built in the township of Victoria Falls. He named Donald Goldin to oversee construction and manage day-to-day operations; Faanya was a contributing partner.

During her time in Rhodesia, Faanya was a witness to the collapse of minority rule. She arrived with Rhodesia's Unilateral Declaration of Independence (UDI), embraced life in the bush, withstood the privations of sanctions imposed by Britain and the United Nations in response to UDI, and weathered the horrors of the escalating guerrilla war and counterinsurgency.

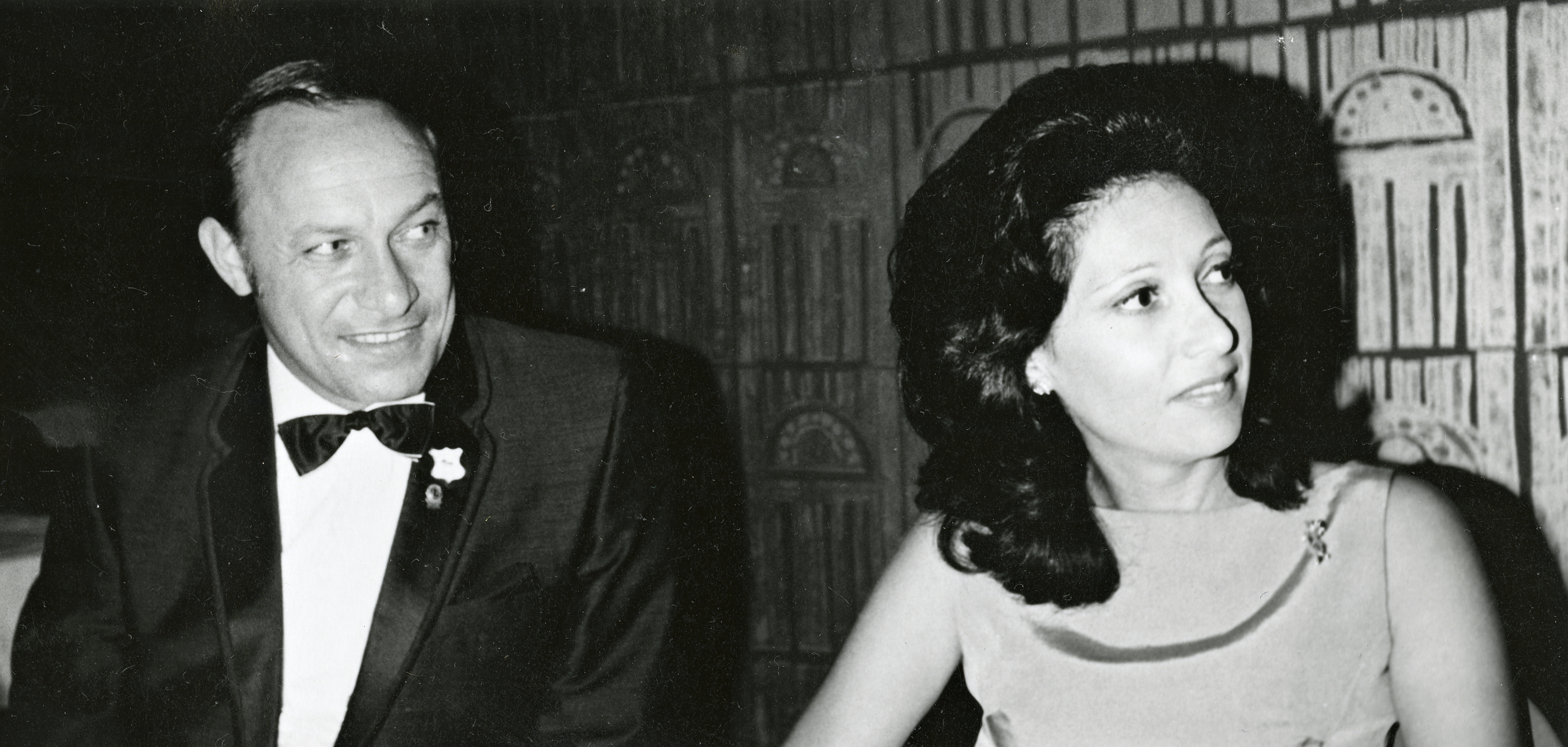
Donald and Faanya Goldin at dinner in Rhodesia, 1970

The Goldins maintained two residences: one in Victoria Falls, near the casino and the seat of local government for the region, and Salisbury (now Harare), the capital and the seat of national government. They also kept a 3,400-hectare (8,400-acre) farm in the northwest bordering the Matetsi River and the Wankie Game Reserve (now Hwange National Park). Long aware of the challenges to African wildlife and the wild spaces of the continent, the Goldins adopted aggressive conservation practices to quell rampant poaching and the over-hunting of game which was decimating the big herds. Their efforts also embraced practices to impede soil erosion. In their care the farm matured to help boost the leopard population in the country and of Faanya personally planting acres of bougainvillea to retain the topsoil.

Through the 1970s, Rhodesia became more and more dangerous. In January 1980, Faanya Rose immigrated to England. In April of that year when majority rule took effect, and Rhodesia became Zimbabwe, her interests in the country were forfeit.

== Business and civic involvement ==
Faanya Rose became a British citizen in 1983. In 1986, she became group treasurer of British property development and investment company Hammerson plc. In 1988, she became group treasurer of British Airports Authority or BAA plc (now the privately held Heathrow Airport Holdings Limited), retiring from the firm in 1998. During her time at BAA she was special financial adviser to the London Ambulance Service.

Rose's service to volunteer leadership has included :

- Presidency of Fight for Sight (UK)
- Pema Ts'al Sakya Monastic Institute
- Director emerita of the Lindbergh Foundation
- Founding trustee, Jewish Association of Business Ethics (JABE)
- Duke of Edinburgh's Award (DofE), Silver Award
- Society of American Registered Architects (New York Council), Medallion of Honor 2002

== Exploration ==
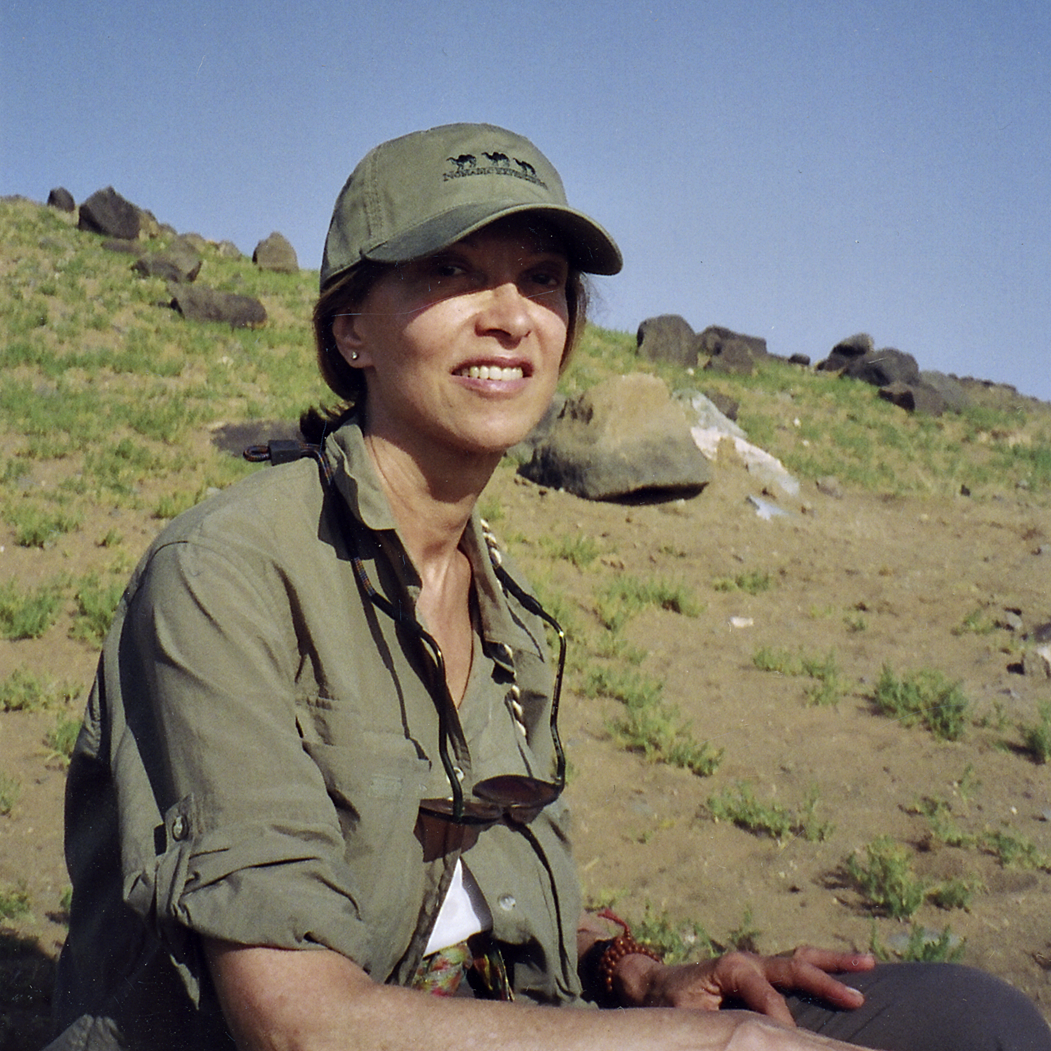
Faanya on the "Great Elephant Quest" in Bardia, Nepal, 1994

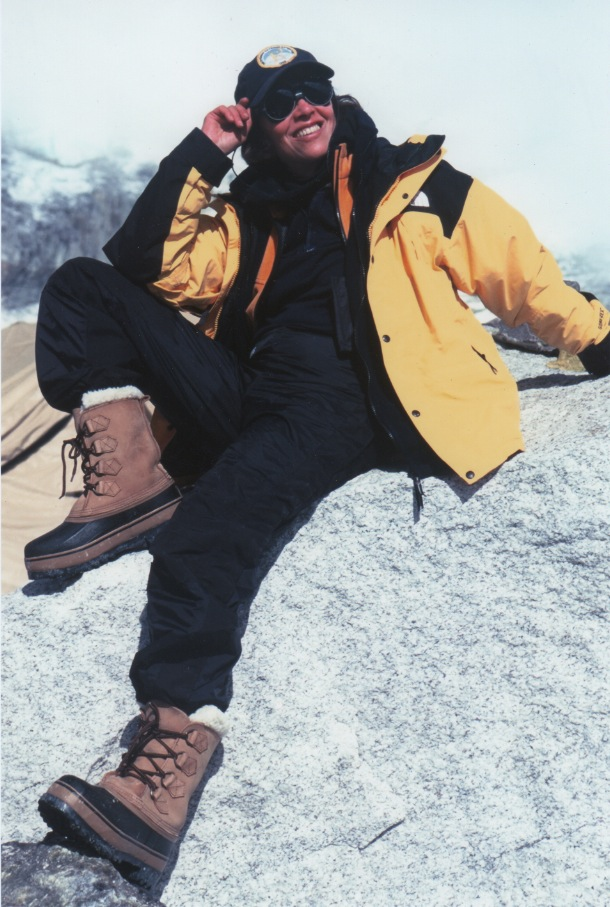
Faanya Rose by explorer Robert Hyman. Base Camp, Mount Everest, 1999

In her twenties, Faanya was a civilian observer of Operation Noah (1958–1964), the world's largest wildlife rescue from the flooding of the Kariba Gorge by the completion of the Kariba Dam. During her years in Rhodesia (1965–1979), she went on safari to hunt and on expeditions into the bush to observe animal habitat and the terrain. In 1993, she participated in an expedition to Tunisia to study the mosaics of Roman Africa sponsored by ASPROM (Association for the Study and Preservation of Roman Mosaics). In 1994, she joined British expedition leader Colonel John Blashford-Snell of the Scientific Exploration Society (SES) on the "Great Elephant Quest" to investigate rumors that giant mammoths thought to be extinct were raiding Nepalese hunting grounds.

Faanya became a member of the Explorers Club in 1994, and was elected director in 1998, and in 2000 by a vote of the board of directors became the first woman president. Her sponsors for membership were John Blashford-Snell and past Club president John Levinson, MD (1927–2009). Thor Heyerdahl, notable for his Kon-Tiki expedition, was a strong advocate for her election to the board. She is a Fellow of the Royal Geographical Society.

Her exploration résumé includes these Explorers Club Flag Expeditions:

Year	Flag #	Expedition Name	Expedition Leader
1998	186	Kota Moma Expedition I	John Blashford-Snell
1999	117	Everest Extreme Expedition (E3)	Scott Hamilton
2002	74	Humpback Whale Research Project I	Scott Hamilton
2003	74	Humpback Whale Research Project II	Scott Hamilton
2007	162	NASA Extreme Environment Mission Operation #12	Kenneth Kamler
2010	176	Tibetan Refugee Eye & Vision Expedition	Scott Hamilton
2011	189	Mount Everest High Altitude Research Expedition	David Hempleman-Adams

== Publications ==
- Goldin, Faanya & Toms, MR. "Treasury Management, The BAA Experience," Airport Forum, V. 25, No. 6 (DEC 1995): pp. 24–26. For an online abstract see TRID, the Transportation Research Board database, retrieved April 5, 2016.
- Rose, Faanya L. "Almost Swept Away." They Lived to Tell the Tale: True Stories of Modern Adventure from the Legendary Explorers Club. Edited by Jan Russell. (Guilford, CT: The Lyons Press, 2007). pp. 149–150. Google Books

About

- Osmond-Evans, Anthony, "Faanya Lydia Rose. A Woman of Achievement." 50 Remarkable Years: The New Elizabethan Age. (Good Connections: The Beautiful Publishing Division, 2001).
