= Kariba, Zimbabwe =

Kariba
- Coat of arms

- Location within Zimbabwe
- Coordinates: 16°31′S 28°48′E
- Country: Zimbabwe
- Province: Mashonaland West
- District: Kariba District

Population (2022 census)
  - Total: 27,600
- Time zone: UTC+2 (CAT)
- Area code: 061
- Climate: Aw

Kariba is a resort town in Mashonaland West province, Zimbabwe, located close to the Kariba Dam at the north-eastern end of Lake Kariba, near the Zambian border. According to the 2022 Population Census, the town had a population of 27,600.

Located in the Zambezi Valley, Kariba is well known for its balmy climate and proximity to Lake Kariba, that draws in thousands of tourists all year round.

== History ==
The pre-colonial population of the area were Tonga.

The town was established to house workers who were constructing the dam in the mid to late 1950s and was constructed by the contractor Costain. After the completion of the dam wall and the power station (Kariba South Power Station) quite a few impressive monuments were built in the early 1960s i.e. the Roman Catholic church located at the Kariba Heights (St. Barbara) and next to it the Pat McClean Theatre named after Patricia McClean a well known wealthy resident of Kariba Heights.

On 11 August 2026, the ferry Mbuya Nehanda running from Kariba to Chalala capsized, resulting in the death of at least 72 people, including 18 children. It is believed to be the deadliest boat disaster in Zimbabwe's history.

== Geography ==
Kariba is located on Lake Kariba, a reservoir created by Kariba Dam on the Zambezi River. Kariba has three main suburbs: Mahombekombe, the older poorer lakeshore high density suburb, Nyamhunga the newer high density suburb and Kariba Heights, the wealthier hilltop suburb and location of the Operation Noah monument. As the name suggests the heights overlook the surrounding region and offer impressive views of Lake Kariba and the opposite lakeshore to the south.

The town has road links connecting it to Harare and to the border of Zambia. It is serviced by Kariba Airport, and has ferry service to Victoria Falls via Mlibizi Fishing camp.

== Economy ==
Kariba town is the centre of the tourist industry for the Lake Kariba region. Kariba town provides accommodation in various hotels and lodges. There are two casinos in the town. Many of the attractions in Kariba for the tourist are water-based. Fishing, game-viewing and house-boating are the most popular activities. Tourists also visit the Kariba Dam wall and local crocodile farms.

The Zimbabwe Electricity Supply Authority ZESA employs workers in the hydroelectric power station. Kapenta fishing is also an important industry, though it was affected by the nationwide fuel shortages, and in the 2010s by drought.

ZB Bank Limited, a commercial bank, maintains a branch in Kariba.

=== Challenges ===
In the twenty-first century, the town of Kariba faced many of the nationwide problems brought on by the depressed national economy, including lack of foreign currency. The town had difficulty in revenue collection. As a result, its fleet did not receive proper maintenance nor replacements, which was also true of its water and sewage system, which suffered chronic pump breakdowns. Kariba also continued to have a large number of unoccupied housing units, left over from the construction boom, units which generated no income.

The restructuring of industry in the early nineties, followed by Zimbabwe economic crisis in the 2000s, greatly impacted Kariba's tourist potential. Many former visitors and residents were involved in trade and agriculture and the impact of the country's crisis led to a decline in domestic tourism as much of the middle class, who were the mainstay of Kariba's tourism industry began to emigrate. In addition a lack of investment in the city's airport and infrastructure has seen the city fall behind to nearby destinations such as Livingstone and Victoria Falls, which offer easy access to Johannesburg, Harare and London. Once ubiquitous, South African tourists increasingly prefer cheaper and more accessible destinations like Mauritius, Tofo Beach and Pemba.

Another challenge to the town is the increasingly outdated infrastructure, particularly Kariba Dam. Years of under-investment threaten the longevity of the dam and its ability to generate power, posing a challenge to the economies of Zambia and Zimbabwe.

== Climate ==
Climate data for Kariba (1961–1990)
Month	Jan	Feb	Mar	Apr	May	Jun	Jul	Aug	Sep	Oct	Nov	Dec	Year
Mean daily maximum °C (°F)	31.0 (87.8)	30.8 (87.4)	31.2 (88.2)	30.5 (86.9)	28.5 (83.3)	26.3 (79.3)	26.3 (79.3)	28.9 (84.0)	32.9 (91.2)	35.1 (95.2)	33.9 (93.0)	31.3 (88.3)	30.6 (87.1)
Mean daily minimum °C (°F)	21.8 (71.2)	21.4 (70.5)	20.7 (69.3)	18.5 (65.3)	14.3 (57.7)	11.2 (52.2)	11.1 (52.0)	13.9 (57.0)	19.1 (66.4)	23.2 (73.8)	23.4 (74.1)	22.1 (71.8)	18.4 (65.1)
Average rainfall mm (inches)	191.6 (7.54)	157.7 (6.21)	112.5 (4.43)	30.0 (1.18)	4.2 (0.17)	1.0 (0.04)	0.6 (0.02)	0.1 (0.00)	0.6 (0.02)	17.8 (0.70)	74.4 (2.93)	175.0 (6.89)	765.5 (30.14)
Average rainy days	16	13	10	3	1	0	0	0	0	2	7	14	66
Source: World Meteorological Organization

Kariba has a tropical savanna climate (Köppen climate classification Aw), with warm winters and very hot summers, and a marked drier season in the winter. Although it is relatively cooler than typical tropical places in the winter and does get occasional 5 °C (41 °F) lows, Kariba nevertheless meets the minimum requirements to be in the savanna climate zone, making it one of few locations in Zimbabwe within this classification. The city's low elevation by Zimbabwean standards, lakeside location, northern locality, and proximity to the Intertropical Convergence Zone shape its climate. Average winter high temperatures, from May to August, range from 24.7 to 26.8 °C (76.4 to 80.3 °F). July is the coolest month with an average daily temperature of 20.1 °C (68.2 °F). Low temperatures fall below 10 °C (50 °F) about 10–15 nights during the winter season, after the passage of cold fronts from the south east that may sometimes produce winter precipitation.

== Education ==
- Kariba Heights Primary School
- Nyamhunga High School
- Nyanhewe Primary School
- Mahombekombe Secondary School

== See also ==
- Kariba Dam
- Lake Kariba
- Zambezi River
- Kariba District
- Operation Noah (Kariba)
- Kariba Airport
