= The Explorers Club =

International multidisciplinary professional society

Coordinates: 40.7700258°N 73.9655750°W

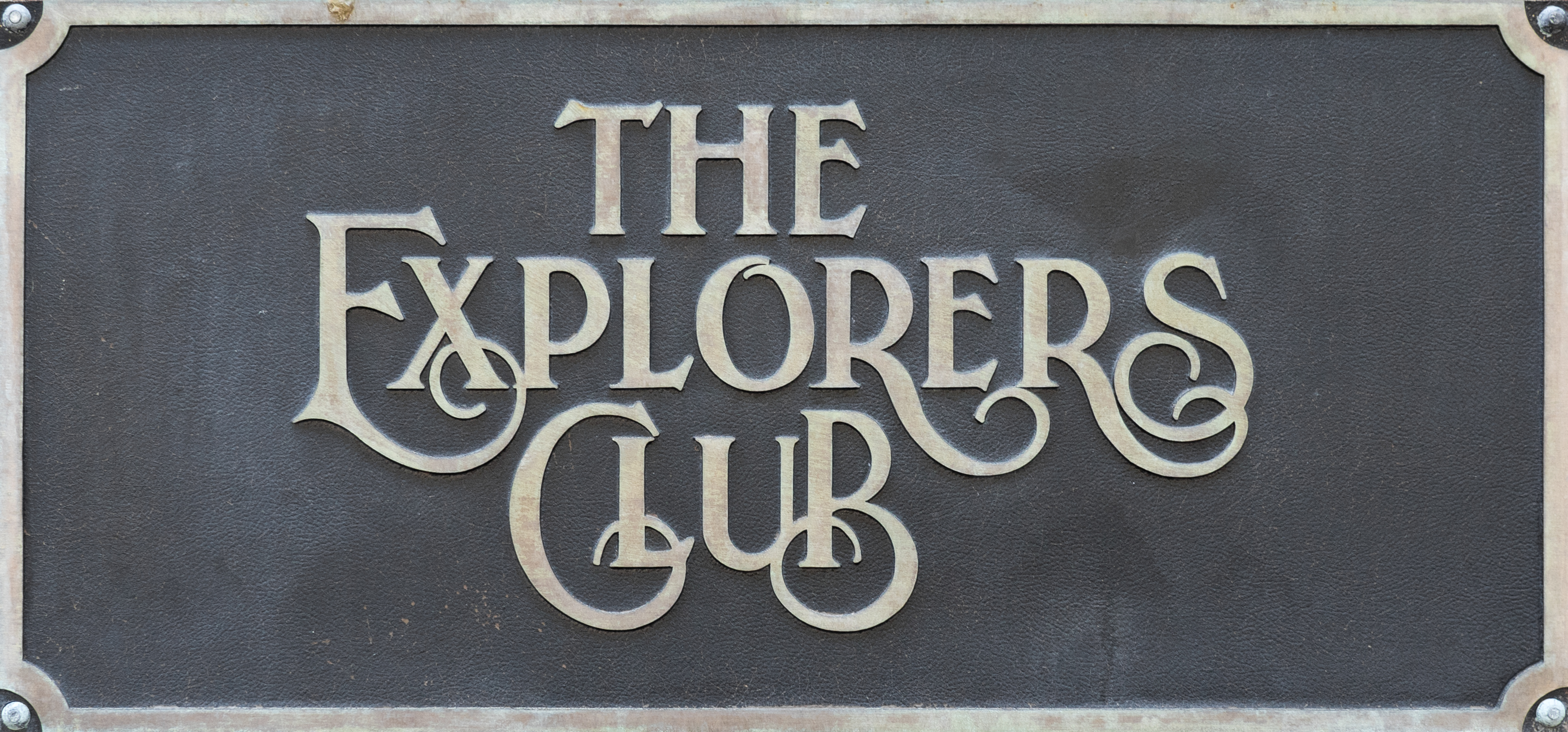

- Headquarters of the Explorers Club in New York City
- Formation: 1904; 122 years ago
- Founder: Henry Collins Walsh
- Headquarters: New York City
- Members: 3,500 (2023)
- Website: explorers.org

The Explorers Club is an American-based international multidisciplinary professional society with the goal of promoting scientific exploration and field study. The club was founded in New York City in 1904 and has served as a meeting point for explorers and scientists worldwide.

The Explorers Club hosts an annual dinner to honor accomplishments in exploration, which is known for its exotic, "adventurous" cuisine.

In 2023, the club reported total revenue of $5,352,688 and total assets of $17,108,895. In 2023 it also reported total giving of $750,479.

== History ==
In 1904, a group of men active in exploration met at the request of noted journalist, historian and explorer Henry Collins Walsh to form an organization to unite explorers in the bonds of good fellowship and to promote the work of exploration by every means in its power. Joining Walsh were Adolphus Greely, Donaldson Smith, Carl Lumholtz, Marshall Saville, Frederick Dellenbaugh and David Brainard. After several further informal meetings, the Explorers Club was incorporated on October 25, 1905. Women were first admitted in 1981, with a class including Sylvia Earle and Kathryn Sullivan.

The Explorers Club has 34 chapters in the United States and around the world, which serve as local contact points for explorers, scientists and students. Many chapters hold monthly dinners, lectures and seminars, award field-research grants to students, publish newsletters and organize expeditions, field trips and educational events.

=== Charter members ===
- David Legge Brainard (1856–1946): U.S. Army Lieutenant-Colonel: Sioux, Bannock, and Nez Perce Campaigns; Survivor, Lady Franklin Bay Expedition (1881–1884); in 1882 claimed Farthest North at 83º24’30” North latitude
- Frank Chapman (1864–1945): Curator of Birds and Mammals, American Museum of Natural History
- Frederick Cook (1865–1940): Surgeon and ethnologist to the first Peary Expedition to Greenland (1892); leader of the SS Miranda Expedition (1894); surgeon on the Belgica Expedition (1897–1898), the first ship to winter over in the Antarctic; founding member of the American Alpine Club (1902)
- Herschel Clifford Parker (1867–1931): Professor of Physics, Columbia University; mountaineer; author; founding member of the American Alpine Club (1902)
- Marshall Howard Saville (1867–1935): Professor of American Archaeology, Columbia University; Curator of Archaeology, American Museum of Natural History
- Henry Collins Walsh (1863–1927): Journalist; historian; explorer of Central America and Greenland; founding member of Arctic Club of America (1894); nominal "founder" of the Explorers Club (1904)
- Caspar Whitney (1862–1929): War correspondent; explorer of North and South America; outdoorsman; sports journalist; member of the International Olympic Committee (1900–1905); author; Editor, Outing magazine
- F. S. Dellenbaugh (1853–1935): Artist, topographer and explorer of the American West; discoverer of the Escalante River and the Henry Mountains
- William H. Furness (1866–1920): Physician, ethnographer and writer; among the first to study and photograph the Kayan people of Borneo and the Wa'ab people on the island of Yap; Curator of the University of Pennsylvania Museum of Archaeology and Anthropology's general ethnology section

=== Famous firsts ===
The Explorers Club is renowned for various "Famous Firsts" accomplished by its members, including:

- First to the North Pole (1909) – Robert E. Peary (honorary membership in 1912) & Matthew Henson. Robert Peary's claim to have been the first to the North Pole has been disputed and current consensus does not support his claim. However, in 1968 Ralph Plaisted became the first undisputed person to reach the North Pole over land.
- First to the South Pole (1911) – Roald Amundsen, honorary membership in 1912
- First to the summit of Mt. Everest (1953) – Sir Edmund Hillary & Tenzing Norgay, elected honorary members 1953
- First to the deepest point in the ocean (1960) – Don Walsh (honorary member 1997) & Jacques Piccard
- First to the surface of the Moon (1969) – Neil Armstrong & Buzz Aldrin

=== Headquarters ===
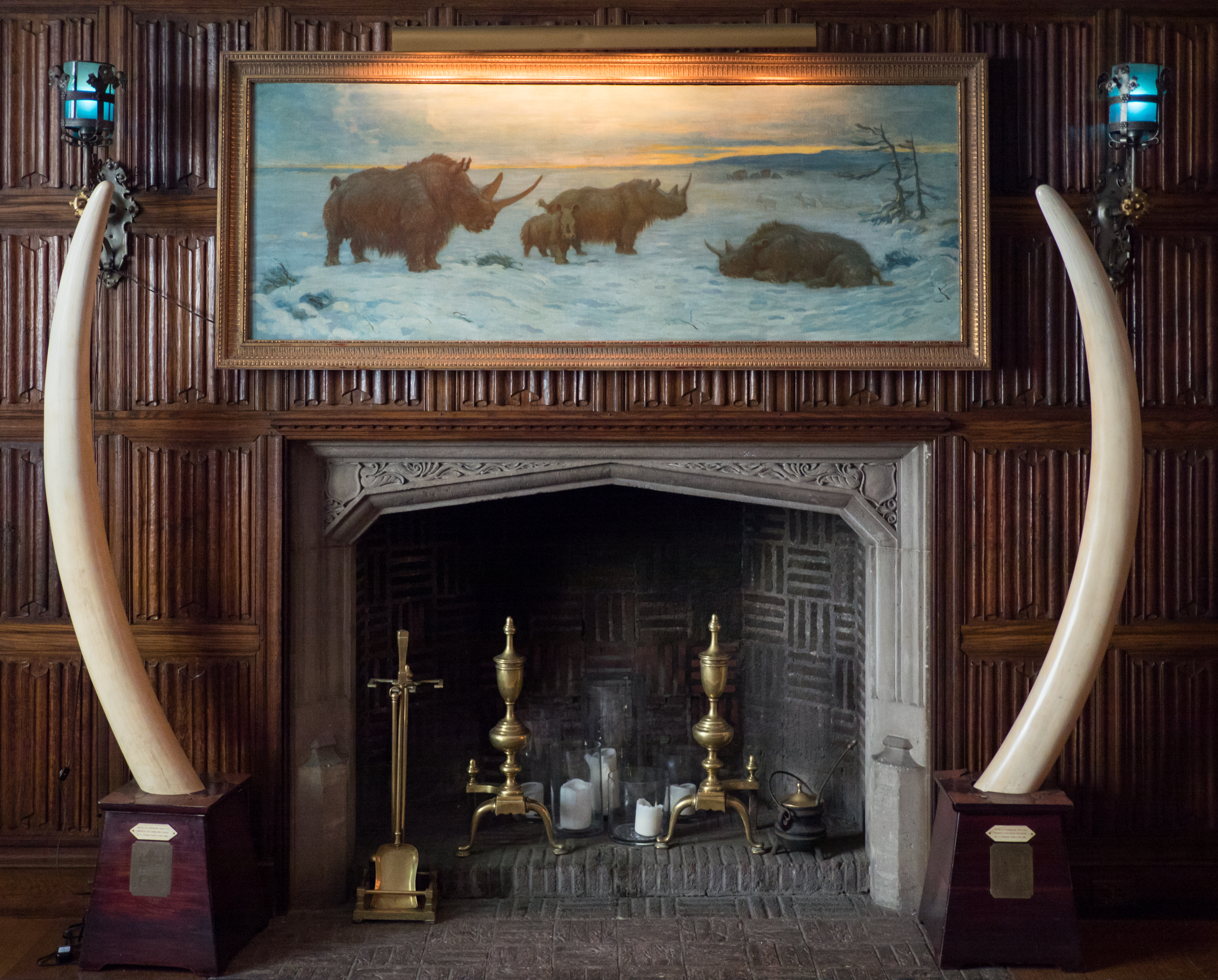
First floor fireplace

The Explorers Club held its first regular meeting at its original headquarters in the Studio Building at 23 West 67th Street in New York City. The club finished construction on its next headquarters at 544 Cathedral Parkway in 1928 and there the club continued to expand its extensive collection of artifacts, trophies and books on exploration.

In 1965, spurred by Lowell Thomas, the club purchased its current headquarters on the Upper East Side, a six-story Jacobean revival mansion on East 70th Street, where it houses the James B. Ford Exploration Library, the Sir Edmund Hillary Map Room and a collection of artifacts from more than a century of exploration. The building was previously the home of Stephen C. Clark. Certain designated rooms of the club are open to the general public.

In 2018, the Explorers Club hosted the Squirrel Census, a citizen science project to count the squirrels of Central Park.

=== Lectures and publications ===
In the 1920s, the club began to invite both explorers returning from the field and visiting scientists to relate their experiences and findings. By the 1930s these informal gatherings developed into academic lectures and illustrated talks. The club continues to provide weekly lectures and programs, which are often open to the public at its headquarters. In November 1921, the Explorers Club published the first edition of The Explorers Journal to share news from the field, remarks from headquarters, recent acquisitions, obituaries and book reviews. The Explorers Journal is still published quarterly, with articles and photography from Explorers Club members in the field.

Television series

In 2022, the Explorers Club and Discovery Channel formed a partnership to produce a series called Tales from the Explorers Club, which is hosted by Explorers Club member Josh Gates. The series covered stories about other famous Explorers Club members such as Ernest Shackleton, Sir Edmund Hillary, Gertrude Bell, Jim Lovell and Jeff Bezos.

=== Engagement with United Nations system ===
The Explorers Club is formally associated with the United Nations Department of Global Communications and, since 2023, has had a Partnership Agreement with the United Nations Educational, Scientific and Cultural Organization (UNESCO). In 2026, it was granted Special Consultative Status with the United Nations Economic and Social Council (ECOSOC).

== Notable fellows and members ==
The Explorers Club has approximately 3,500 members worldwide, with members from every continent and in more than 60 countries. The club differentiates exploration for field science from exploratory travel for tourism. Individuals eligible for membership are those who engage in or support field science expeditions aimed at exploring unfamiliar or poorly understood locations or phenomena, with the goal of acquiring knowledge for the benefit of humanity. The focus is on individuals who have gained practical experience by actively participating in fieldwork as participants in one or more documented scientific expeditions. The club has made it a priority to expand its membership to include qualified explorers from across a range of diversities, including race, culture, gender, age, sexual orientation, geography and socio-economic level, as well as explorers with disabilities.

Membership and affiliation of the club is divided into several categories. Fellows have made documented contributions to scientific knowledge through field expeditions. Such accomplishments are often evidenced by regular scientific publication, but may also be documented in books, popular media, or broadcast media. Members have evidenced a sustained interest and participation in some aspect of field exploration and have contributed in broad terms to the cause of exploration and the furthering of scientific knowledge. Term memberships are open to full-time graduate students and teaching instructors that meet the same standards/qualifications that exist for regular Members. "Friends of the Club" are individuals who wish to associate with The Explorers Club and support its mission. Student Members are full-time students, between the ages of 16 and 30, who are enrolled in accredited institutions and are interested in pursuing exploration or field science as a future career or avocation.

Well-known members, fellows, and honorary members of The Explorers Club have included:

- Theodore Roosevelt
- John Glenn
- Jim Fowler
- Walter Cronkite
- Philip Johnston
- Prince Philip, Duke of Edinburgh
- Sir Edmund Hillary
- Elon Musk
- Jeff Bezos
- Buzz Aldrin
- Richard Wiese
- Albert I, Prince of Monaco

== The Explorers Club flag ==
The Explorers Club flag

The Explorers Club flag has been carried on hundreds of expeditions by club members since 1918. To obtain permission to carry the flag, a club member must show that the expedition holds the promise of scientific results. The flag must be exhibited at every suitable opportunity on the expedition, and must be returned to the club along with a written record of the expedition, called the Flag Report. The club's Research Collections is the repository for these unique reports, including the original "Flag Book" – a bound journal of hand-written reports, vintage prints, clippings and assorted records submitted by the explorers who first carried the Explorers Club flag on expeditions.

There are currently 242 numbered flags. Many of the older flags have been retired. The Explorers Club flag has been carried on such expeditions as:

- Flag #2 – Roy Chapman Andrews – the Gobi Desert expeditions
- Flag #7 – Sir George Hubert Wilkins – the first trans-Arctic flights
- Flag #32 – Capt. Robert A. "Bob" Bartlett – the Effie M. Morrissey expeditions
- Flag #50 – Bertrand Piccard and André Borschberg – Solar Impulse across America
- Flag #61 – Luc Hardy – the Pax Arctica expedition (Canadian Arctic)
- Flag #71 – Raphaël Domjan – PlanetSolar the first around the world with solar energy
- Flag #80 – Tim Taylor FN’04, Citation of Merit Laureate 2008 – Discovery of three lost US WWII submarines: Expedition R-12, Expedition S-26, Expedition S-28
- Flag #81 – Victor Vescovo and Patrick Lahey – the Five Deeps expedition
- Flag #105 – L. Ron Hubbard – The Alaska Radio Experimental Expedition
- Flag #123 – Thor Heyerdahl – the Kon-Tiki expedition
- Flag #132 – David Concannon for Jeff Bezos and Bezos Expeditions – the Saturn V F-1 engine search and recovery expedition
- Flag #134 – Gino Caspari – Discovery of Royal Scythian Tomb Tunnug 1
- Flag #150 – George Kourounis – collecting soil samples from the Darvaza gas crater
- Flag #161 – James Cameron – the Deepsea Challenger expedition
- Flag #163 – L. Ron Hubbard – The Oceanographic-Archeological Expedition (1961) and the Hubbard Geological Survey Expedition (1966)
- Flag #179 – David Isserman – introducing the endangered Sorraia horses to the Alentejo as a rewilding initiative
- Flag #193 – Naomi Uemura – first solo North Pole expedition

NASA missions Apollo 8, Apollo 11, Apollo 13 and Apollo 15 each carried miniature club flags on board.

== Honors and grants ==
=== Honors ===
The Explorers Club Medal, the highest honor that can be bestowed by the Club, is awarded for "extraordinary contributions directly in the field of exploration, scientific research, or to the welfare of humanity". Past recipients include:

- 1914 – Robert E. Peary
- 1917 – William Curtis Farabee
- 1918 – Vilhjalmur Stefansson
- 1919 – Cândido Mariano da Silva Rondon
- 1923 – Adolphus W. Greely
- 1925 – Lowell H. Smith
- 1926 – Knud Rasmussen
- 1927 – Roald Amundsen
- 1927 – Robert Bartlett
- 1927 – Fridtjof Nansen
- 1929 – David L. Brainard
- 1932 – Roy Chapman Andrews
- 1936 – Lincoln Ellsworth
- 1937 – Richard E. Byrd
- 1940 – Sir Hubert Wilkins
- 1950 – Isaiah Bowman
- 1951 – Bernt Balchen
- 1953 – James Chapin
- 1953 – Donald B. MacMillan
- 1954 – Lord John Hunt
- 1954 – Auguste Piccard
- 1957 – Laurence McKinley Gould
- 1959 – Sir Vivian Fuchs for the Commonwealth Trans-Antarctic Expedition
- 1961 – President Herbert Hoover
- 1962 – Alexander Wetmore
- 1963 – William H. Phelps, Jr.
- 1964 – Gilbert H. Grosvenor
- 1965 – James H. Doolittle
- 1966 – Robert Cushman Murphy
- 1967 – Charles B. Hitchcock
- 1968 – Finn Ronne
- 1968 – Lowell Thomas
- 1969 – William B.O. Field, Jr.
- 1970 – Julius M. Amberson
- 1971 – Michael J. Leahy
- 1971 – Neil Armstrong, Buzz Aldrin and Michael Collins for NASA
- 1972 – Walter A. Wood
- 1973 – Serge A. Korff
- 1974 – Roger Tory Peterson
- 1975 – Junius B. Bird
- 1976 – Edward M. Weyer, Jr.
- 1977 – Lewis N. Cotlow
- 1978 – Leigh Wade
- 1979 – Thor Heyerdahl
- 1980 – Willard N. Bascom
- 1981 – Carl von Hoffman
- 1982 – Virgil Kauffman
- 1983 – Sir Ranulph Fiennes for Transglobe Expedition
- 1984 – H. Bradford Washburn, Jr.
- 1985 – Sir Wally Herbert
- 1986 – Sir Edmund P. Hillary
- 1987 – Barry C. Bishop
- 1988 – Gilbert M. Grosvenor for National Geographic Society
- 1989 – Mary Leakey for the Leakey Family
- 1990 – George B. Schaller
- 1991 – William J. L. Sladen
- 1992 – Heinrich Harrer
- 1993 – Dame Jane Goodall
- 1994 – James M. Fowler
- 1995 – Robert D. Ballard
- 1996 – Sylvia A. Earle
- 1997 – Anna C. Roosevelt
- 1998 – Ardito Desio
- 1999 – Norman D. Vaughan
- 2000 – The Piccard Family
- 2001 – Joseph W. Kittinger
- 2001 – Don Walsh
- 2002 – Johan Reinhard
- 2003 – Steve Fossett
- 2004 – David K. Hempleman-Adams
- 2005 – Burt Rutan, Brian Binnie and Michael Melvill for SpaceShipOne
- 2006 – J. Michael Fay
- 2007 – Kathryn D. Sullivan
- 2008 – Eugenie Clark
- 2009 – Lee M. Talbot
- 2009 – Edward O. Wilson
- 2010 – Donald C. Johanson
- 2011 – Wade Davis
- 2012 – Philip J. Currie
- 2012 – Alfred S. McLaren
- 2013 – James Cameron
- 2014 – Walter Munk
- 2015 – Neil deGrasse Tyson
- 2016 – Frederick Roots
- 2017 – André Borschberg, Bertrand Piccard and Nainoa Thompson
- 2018 – James A. Lovell
- 2019 – Kenneth Lacovara
- 2020 – Victor Vescovo
- 2021 – Dereck and Beverly Joubert
- 2022 – Rick Ridgeway
- 2023 – Margaret D. Lowman
- 2024 – Rita Colwell
- 2025 – Biruté Mary Galdikas
- 2026 – Kristine McDivitt Tompkins

The Legendary Explorer Medal is given "to recognize a feat of such courage and incredible accomplishment that has transcended the ordinary bounds of history". Past recipients include:

- 2013 – Scott Carpenter
- 2013 – John Glenn
- 2020 – Dame Jane Goodall
- 2024 – Rusty Schweickart

Beyond The Explorers Club Medal and The Legendary Explorer Medal, the club also presents, among others, The Edward C. Sweeney Medal, The Citation of Merit, The Lowell Thomas Award, The Finn Ronne Memorial Award, The Buzz Aldrin Space Exploration Award, The Tenzing Norgay Award, The William Beebe Award, The President’s Award and The New Explorer Award.

Since 2021, The Explorers Club 50 (EC50) award recognizes fifty individuals across all fields within natural history. The headline for this award is "Fifty people changing the world that the world needs to know about".

=== Grants ===
The club also awards a range of grants for field science and exploration, including the Youth Activity Fund Grant, the Exploration Fund Grant and the President's Award for Exploration and Technology. One club award, the Scott Pearlman Field Award for Science and Exploration, is named for one of the youngest club members (inducted at age 22) who was a photographer and participant in three flag expeditions. Scott A. Pearlman contracted hepatitis C and died at the age of 38. Pearlman was a son of Explorers Club member and officer Robert E. Pearlman.

== Presidents ==
Presidents of the Explorers Club are elected by a vote of the Board of Directors after the Annual Meeting. Men and women may offer their name for consideration.

#	From	To	President
1	1905	1906	Adolphus Greely
2	1907	1908	Frederick Cook
3	1909	1911	Robert Peary
4	1912	1913	David Legge Brainard
5	1913	1916	Robert Peary
6	1917	1918	Carl Akeley
7	1919	1922	Vilhjalmur Stefansson
8	1922	1925	George Gustav Heye
9	1926	1927	James Ford
10	1928	1930	George Gustav Heye
11	1931	1934	Roy Chapman Andrews
12	1935	1937	Walter W. Granger
13	1937	1939	Vilhjalmur Stefansson
14	1940	1943	Herbert Spinden
15	1944	1946	Alexander Wetmore
16	1947	1948	Clyde Fisher
17	1949	1950	James Chapin
18	1951	1952	John Tee-Van
19	1953	1954	Edward Weyer Jr.
20	1955	1958	Serge A. Korff
21	1959	1961	Charles Hitchcock
22	1961	1963	John Pallister
23	1963	1965	Serge A. Korff
24	1965	1967	Edward C. Sweeney
25	1967	1971	Walter Wood
26	1971	1973	Hobart Van Dressen
27	1973	1975	Russell Gurnee
28	1975	1976	E. Lovell Becker
29	1976	1978	Virgil Kauffman
30	1978	1981	Charles Brush
31	1981	1985	George V.B. Cochran
32	1985	1987	John Levinson
33	1987	1989	John Bruno
34	1989	1991	Nicholas Sullivan
35	1991	1993	David Swanson
36	1993	1996	John Loret
37	1996	2000	Alfred S. McLaren
38	2000	2002	Faanya Rose
39	2002	2006	Richard Wiese
40	2006	2009	Daniel Bennett
41	2009	2012	Lorie Karnath
42	2012	2015	Alan Nichols
43	2015	2018	Ted Janulis
44	2018	2021	Richard Wiese
45	2021	2025	Richard Garriott
46	2025	2026	Richard Wiese
47	2026		Barbara Doran
