= Henry Walsh =

Henry Walsh may refer to:

- Henry Walsh (cricketer) (born 1993), New Zealand cricketer
- Henry A. Walsh, American priest of the Archdiocese of Boston
- Henry A. Walsh (architect), American architect of Cathedral of the Most Blessed Sacrament
- Henry Alfred Walsh, Companion of the Order of the Bath in 1905 (1905 Birthday Honours)
- Henry Collins Walsh (1863–1927), founder of The Explorers Club in 1904
- Henry Sallows Walsh, Australian politician, mayor of Melbourne in 1858
- Henry Walsh, mayor of Waterford in 1556
- John Henry Walsh ('Stonehenge') (1810–1888), writer on sport
- Henry Walsh (runner) (born 1923), runner-up in the 5000 m at the 1945 USA Outdoor Track and Field Championships
