= Elasmodactylus tetensis =

Conservation status
- Least Concern (IUCN 3.1)

Scientific classification
- Domain: Eukaryota
- Kingdom: Animalia
- Phylum: Chordata
- Class: Reptilia
- Order: Squamata
- Infraorder: Gekkota
- Family: Gekkonidae
- Genus: Elasmodactylus
- Species: E. tetensis

Binomial name
- Elasmodactylus tetensis Loveridge, 1953
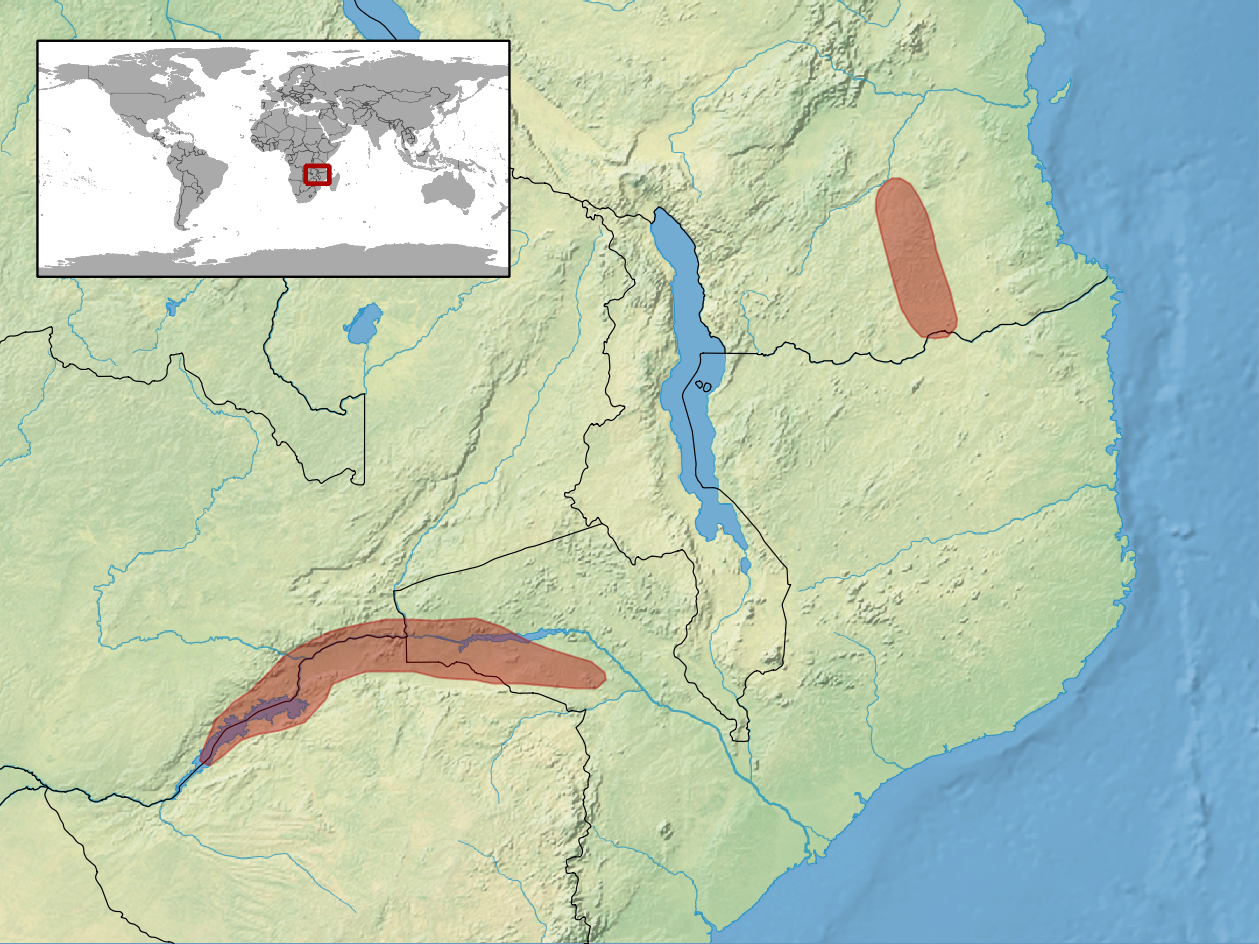

Synonyms
- Pachydactylus tetensis Loveridge, 1953

Species of lizard

Elasmodactylus tetensis, commonly known as the Tete thick-toed gecko or Zambezi thick-toed gecko, is a species of gecko endemic to East Africa.

== Description ==
E. tetensis, unlike any other species in the genus Elasmodactylus, is very large, and males have 8-14 preanal pores.

== Geographic range & habitat ==
E. tetensis is found in Mopane bushveld in the Zambezi river valley from Lake Kariba to Tete. There is a disjunct population in southern Tanzania.

== Behaviour ==
E. tetensis is a highly gregarious species and often roosts side by side with numerous other individuals during the day in rock cracks or hollow tree trunks like hollow baobab trees.

They are nocturnal insectivores but may forage within a short distance of their roost during daylight. Once it is dark, they extend the territory they patrol in search of arthropods.

== Reproduction ==
Sexually mature females lay two eggs at a time but can produce several clutches a season depending on food supply.

== Subspecies ==
There is an isolated population in southern Tanzania in similar habitat that is very likely a subspecies or another species forming a complex with tetensis.
