= Thick-toed gecko =

The following genera that are commonly called "thick-toed" geckos:

- Chondrodactylus, a genus of geckos
- Elasmodactylus, a small genus of geckos from Africa
- Pachydactylus, a genus of insectivorous geckos endemic to Africa
