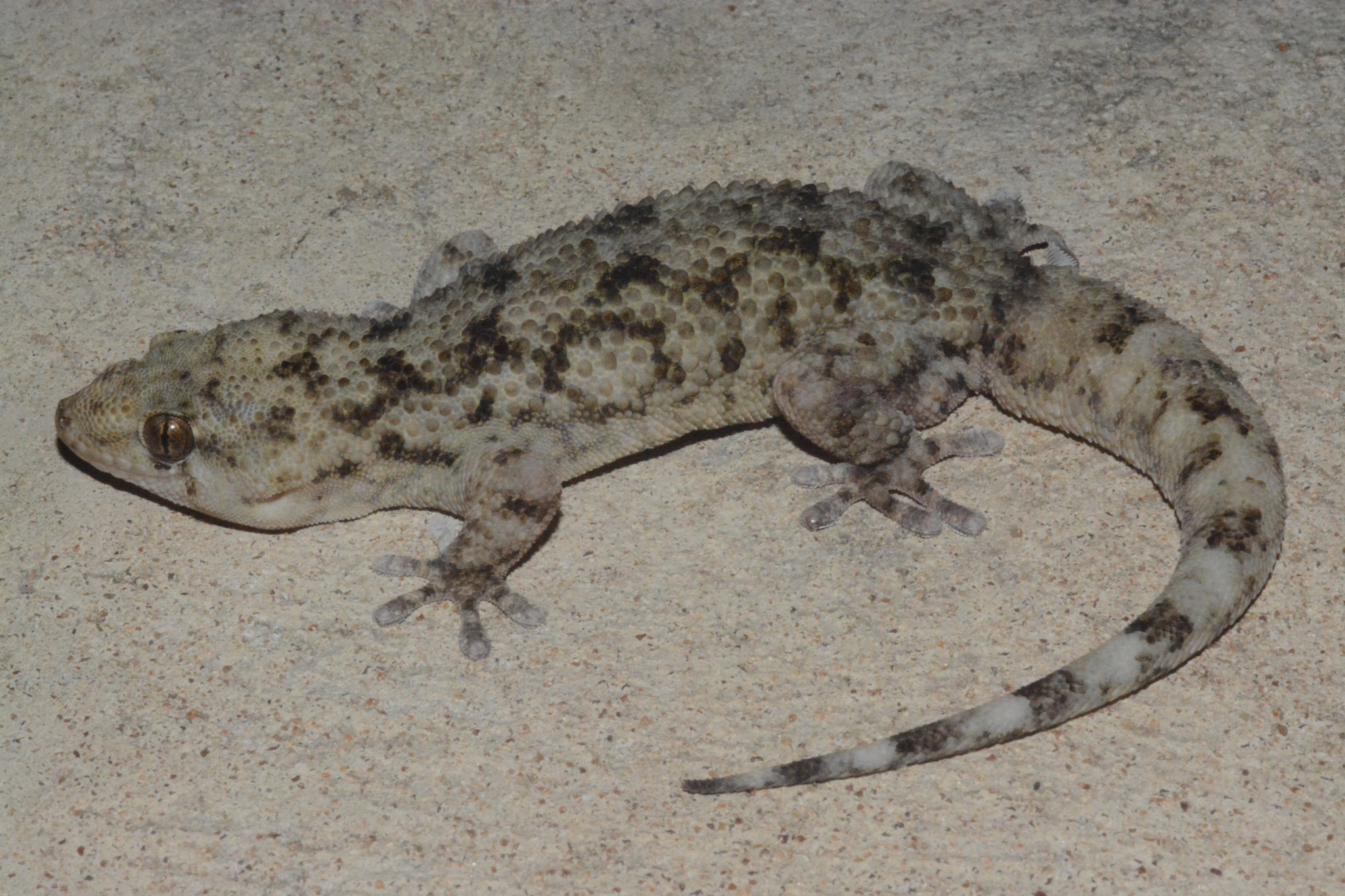

Conservation status
- Least Concern (IUCN 3.1)

Scientific classification
- Kingdom: Animalia
- Phylum: Chordata
- Class: Reptilia
- Order: Squamata
- Suborder: Gekkota
- Family: Gekkonidae
- Genus: Elasmodactylus
- Species: E. tuberculosus

Binomial name
- Elasmodactylus tuberculosus Boulenger, 1895
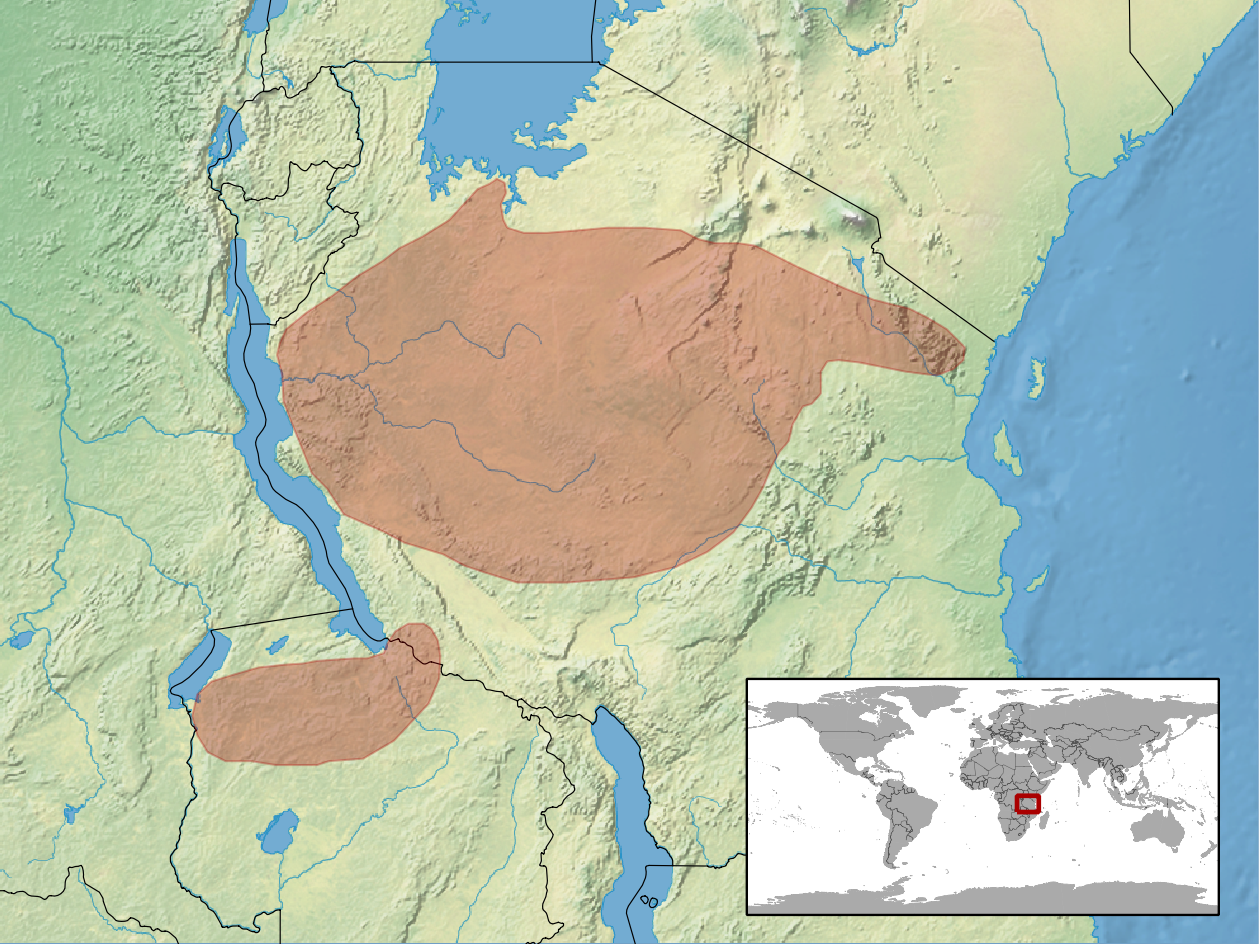

Synonyms
- Pachydactylus tuberculosus; Pachydactylus boulengeri; Elasmodactylus triedrus

= Warty thick-toed gecko =

Species of lizard

The warty thick-toed gecko (Elasmodactylus tuberculosus) is a species of lizard in the family Gekkonidae. It is found in eastern Africa .
