= Operation Noah (Kariba) =

Wildlife rescue operation in the Zambezi River

Operation Noah was a wildlife rescue operation on the Zambezi River lasting from 1958 to 1964. In the late 1950s, Northern and Southern Rhodesia (present-day Zambia and Zimbabwe) constructed the Kariba Dam hydroelectric power station across the Zambezi River, at the Kariba Gorge, about 400 km from Victoria Falls. The Kariba Dam mostly provided electric power to both countries, created Lake Kariba, the world's largest man-made lake, and flooded the Kariba Gorge - home to thousands of native animals and the local Tonga people. In a wildlife rescue operation lasting 5 years, over 6000 animals were rescued and relocated to the mainland.

The operation was led by Rupert Fothergill. Wildlife was moved from the rising waters and largely relocated to Matusadona National Park and around Lake Kariba. Over 6,000 animals (elephants, antelopes, rhinos, lions, leopards, zebras, warthogs, birds and snakes) were rescued.

== See also ==
- Kariba Dam
