= John Loret =

American marine biologist and explorer (1928–2011)

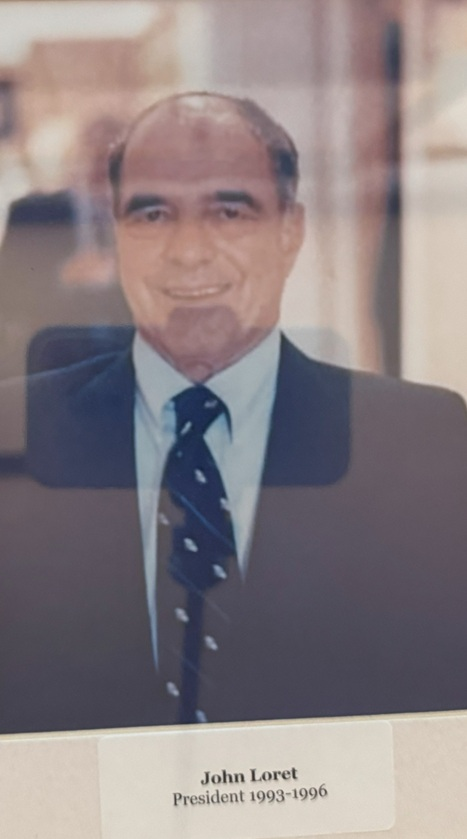
John Loret Explorers Club President

John Loret (November 28, 1928 – August 13, 2011) was an American marine biologist and explorer. He was a teacher at Queens College, City University of New York. He was the director of the "Science Museum of Long Island ". In the 1980's John lead expeditions into the Mexican jungle looking for Myan temples. I recall that he had mapped parts of Mexico, before Satellite images were available. He also had a waterfall named after him. He was a small man in stature, but a very large man in life. A very driven man of excellence that always pushed people to do better.

Loret was born in Albany, New York in 1928. He served in the United States Coast Guard from 1946 to 1949. He studied at the New York University and was admitted to the degree of Doctor of Philosophy at the University of Connecticut in 1974.

John Loret was the President of The Explorers Club from 1993 to 1996. John was one of the Last of the Old Time Explorers, he sailed with Thor Heyerdahl in 1955 to Easter Island on the Aku-Aku expedition

John Loret Expedition Leader

John Loret; John T. Tanacredi (31 May 1998). Ocean Pulse: A Critical Diagnosis. New York: Springer. ISBN 9780306458002.
John Loret; John T. Tanacredi (1 Jan 2000). Experiment Central: Understanding Scientific Principles Through Projects. University of Michigan: Gale Group. ISBN 0787628921.
Loret, John (1 September 2012). Easter Island : Scientific Exploration Into the World's Environmental Problems in Microcosm (Paperback). Springer Us. p. 240. ISBN 9781461349563.
