= Nyami Nyami =

Tonga god

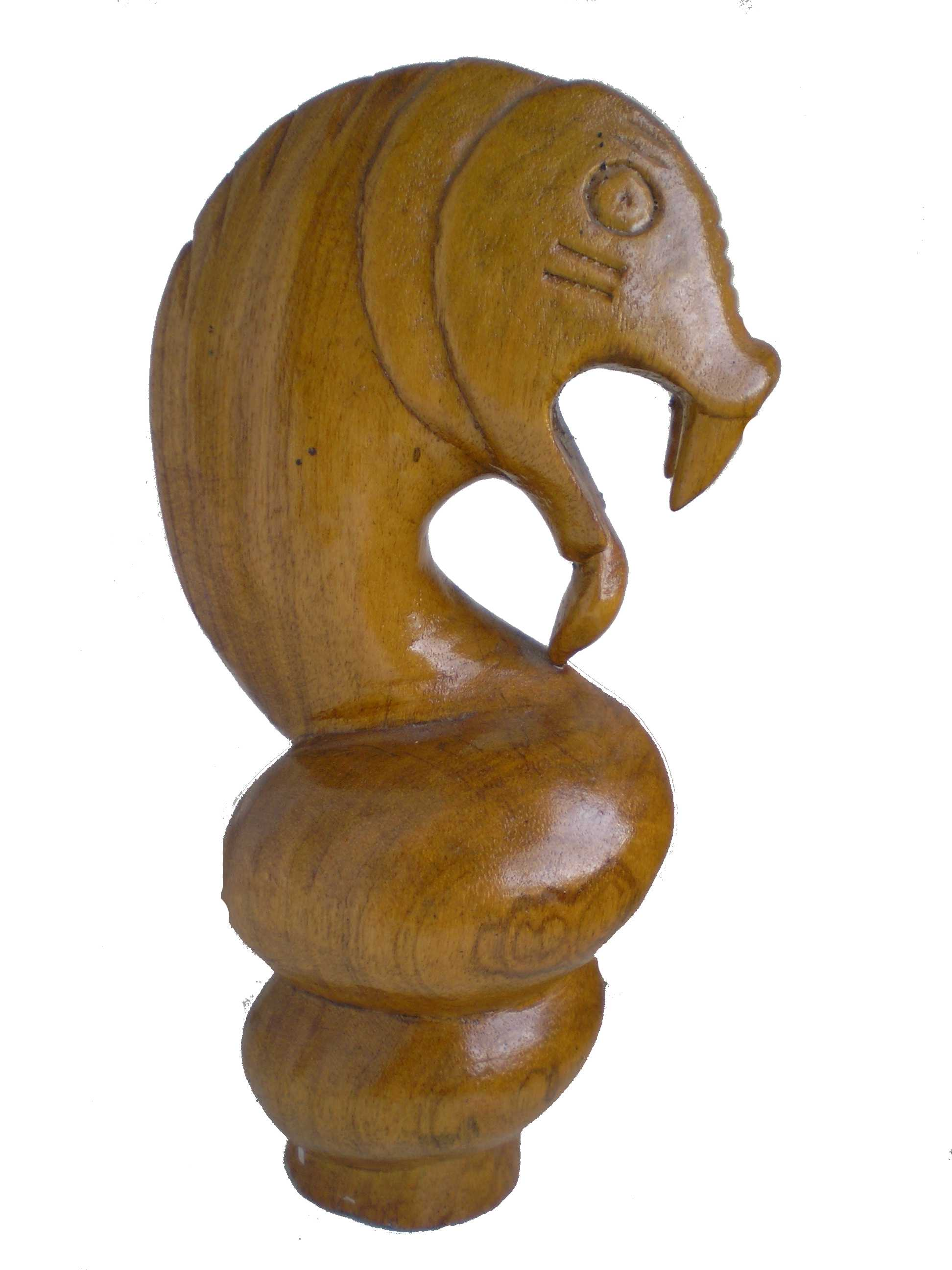
- Wooden carving of the Nyami Nyami

Creature information
- Other name(s): Zambezi River God, Zambezi River Spirit
- Sub grouping: Lake monster

Origin
- Country: Zambia, Zimbabwe
- Region: Zambezi
- Habitat: Zambezi River, Kariba Dam

The Nyami Nyami, otherwise known as the Zambezi River God or Zambezi Snake Spirit, is one of the most important gods of the people living along the Zambezi River. The Nyami Nyami is believed to protect the people and give them sustenance in difficult times. The River God is usually portrayed as male.

Variously described as having the body of a snake and the head of a fish, a whirlpool or a river dragon, the Nyami Nyami is seen as the god of Zambezi Valley and the river before the creation of the Kariba Dam. He is regularly depicted as a snake-like being or dragon-like creature with a snake's torso and the head of a fish. It can be found as pendants on jewelry, usually carved out of wood, stone or bone, occasionally ivory, silver or gold both as a fashion accessory and as a good luck charm similar to the wearing of a St Christopher medallion. Elaborate traditionally carved walking sticks depicting the Nyami Nyami and its relationship with the valley's inhabitants were popular with tourists visiting Zambia and have historically been gifts to prestigious visitors.

It is the traditional role of tribal elders and spirit mediums to intercede on behalf of the inhabitants of the river valley when the Nyami Nyami is angered.

The Nyami Nyami is said to reside in the Zambezi River and control the life in and on the river. The spirits of the Nyami Nyami and his wife residing in the Kariba Gorge are God and Goddess of the underworld. The people believe the building of the Kariba Dam deeply offended the Nyami Nyami, separating him from his wife. The regular flooding and many deaths during the dam's construction were attributed to his wrath. The Tonga believe that the Nyami Nyami withdrew from the world of men after the Kariba Dam was completed.

== Legend ==
Although there are several different legends surrounding the Nyami Nyami the Kariba legend is the most documented and widely known fable.

The Kariba Legend

"The Tonga People lived in the Zambezi Valley for centuries in peaceful seclusion and with little contact with the outside world. They were simple folk who built their houses in kraal along the banks of the great river and believed that their gods looked after them supplying them with water and food.

But their idealistic lifestyle was to be blown apart. In the early 1940s a report was made about the possibility of a hydro-electric scheme to supply power for the growing industry that colonialism had brought to the federation of countries that were known as Northern Rhodesia on one side of the river and Southern Rhodesia on the other, now Zambia and Zimbabwe.

In 1956, construction on the Kariba Dam project was started.

Heavy earth-moving equipment roared into the valley and tore out thousands of hundred-year-old trees to build roads and settlements to house the workers who poured into the area to build a dam that would harness the powerful river. The Tonga's peace and solitude was shattered and they were told to leave their homes and move away from the river to avoid the flood that the dam would cause. Many of them were forcibly removed as they would not believe that their fields and homes they had known all their lives would now be flooded and under water.

The name Kariba comes from the word Kariva or karinga, meaning trap, which refers to a rock jutting out from the gorge where the dam wall was to be built. It was believed by the BaTonga to be the home of the Nyami Nyami, the river god, and they believed anyone who ventured near the rock was dragged down to spend eternity under the water.

Reluctantly they allowed themselves to be resettled higher up the bank, but they believed the Nyami Nyami would never allow the dam to be built and eventually, when the project failed, they would move back to their homes.

In 1957, when the dam was well on its way to completion, the Nyami Nyami struck. The worst floods ever known on the Zambezi washed away much of the partly built dam and the heavy equipment, killing many of the workers.

Some of those killed were white men whose bodies disappeared mysteriously, and after an extensive search failed to find them, Valley Tonga elders were asked to assist as their tribesmen knew the river better than anyone. The elders explained the Nyami Nyami had caused the disaster and in order to appease his wrath a sacrifice should be made.

They weren't taken seriously, but, in desperation, when relatives of the missing workers were due to arrive to claim the bodies of their loved ones, the search party agreed in the hope that the tribesmen would know where the bodies were likely to have been washed to.

A black calf was slaughtered and floated on the river. The next morning the calf was gone and the workers’ bodies were in its place. The disappearance of the calf holds no mystery in the crocodile infested river, but the reappearance of the workers’ bodies three days after they had disappeared has never been satisfactorily explained.

After the disaster, flow patterns of the river were studied to ascertain whether there was a likelihood of another flood and it was agreed a flood of comparable intensity would only occur once every thousand years.

The very next rainy season, however, brought further floods even worse than the previous year. Nyami Nyami had struck again, destroying the coffer dam, the access bridge and parts of the main wall.

The project survived and the great river was eventually controlled. In 1960 the generators were switched on and have been supplying electricity to Zimbabwe and Zambia ever since.

The BaTonga still live on the shores of Zambezi River, and many still believe one day the Nyami Nyami will fulfill his promise and they will be able to return to their homes on the banks of the river. They believe the Nyami Nyami and his wife were separated by the wall across the river, and the frequent earth tremors felt in the area since the wall was built are caused by the spirit trying to reach his wife, and one day he will destroy the dam. The small earthquakes are actually caused by the weight of water stored in Lake Kariba pressing down on the Earth's crust, and intensify with changes in water levels in the lake.

== See also ==
- Zambezi
  - Kariba Dam
