= Squirrel Census =

Community squirrel-counting project

The Squirrel Census is a series of crowdsourced squirrel-counting projects. Launched by writer Jamie Allen in 2011, the first squirrel census was conducted in 2012 in Inman Park, Atlanta, United States, and was followed by a second in 2015. More than 300 volunteers conducted a census in Central Park, New York City, in 2018. The project has been on hiatus since 2021. Organizers described the project as intended to tell a story, rather than being a scientific inquiry; according to Allen, the census is about "the Eastern gray, urban green spaces, and us".

== History ==
=== Origin and Inman Park censuses ===
The first squirrel census was launched in 2011 by Jamie Allen, a short fiction writer and advertising copywriter. While writing a short story involving squirrels, Allen became curious about how many squirrels were in his neighborhood of Inman Park, Atlanta. To conduct the first census, he and a group of friends raised almost $9,000 on Kickstarter and coordinated a group of volunteers. The team divided Inman Park into 151 hectares, where in April 2012 volunteers visited each hectare twice a day for a month. Following squirrel counting methods proposed by biologist and squirrel expert Vagn F. Flyger in 1959, they estimated the Inman Park squirrel population at 861.

In 2015, the team conducted a second census of Inman Park, estimating that the neighborhood's squirrel population had increased to 928.

=== Central Park census ===
A squirrel in Central Park

Hosted at The Explorers Club in New York City in October 2018, Allen and other organizers coordinated more than 300 volunteers to conduct the third squirrel census, the first in Central Park. At the time, there was no official count of the park's squirrel population. A census had been proposed by the New York City Department of Parks and Recreation in 1983, which would have taken a mark and recapture approach to estimating the park's squirrel abundance, but the proposal was not implemented.

Covering 843 acres during 11 days, the project estimated that Central Park contained 2,373 eastern gray squirrels. As with the Inman Park censuses, the project used Flyger's formula to estimate the total squirrel abundance, which adjusts for multi-counting and omissions. The formula incorporates the size of the area surveyed, the time spent observing, the average observation distance, visibility over the area, and the number of squirrels seen.

The counting involved dividing the park into 350 hectares and, as with the Inman Park census, assigning volunteers to each hectare. Volunteers recorded squirrels in each hectare twice for twenty minutes, once in the morning and once in the afternoon. Dividing the park into hectares required a more detailed map than what was available, and in the 15 months leading up to the census, cartographer Nat Slaughter and his team mapped the park and its features, resulting in one of the most comprehensive maps of Central Park.

Volunteer squirrel-counters reported information beyond the squirrels' geographic location and time, including demographics (fur color, apparent age), their behavior (making noises, eating, climbing), and their reaction to humans. The census found that approximately 81% of the squirrels had gray fur, with the remainder having either black or cinnamon-colored fur. The densest population of squirrels was in the Ramble, a woodland nature reserve within the park.

The Central Park census received support from The Explorers Club, New York University's Department of Environmental Studies, Macaulay Honors College, the Central Park Conservancy, and the New York City Department of Parks and Recreation.

=== Future censuses ===
It was announced in March 2021 that the Squirrel Census would be on hiatus. As of 2024, the project remains on extended hiatus, with Allen likening the situation to a band in-between albums.

== Purpose and data ==
While scientists conduct surveys of animal populations to study their environment and ecology, the Squirrel Census is, in the words of Keren Landman writing for Vox, intended "to produce not science, but story". Rather than seeking to prove a hypothesis or inform a specific study, the Squirrel Census aimed to connect its volunteers with their environment and tell a story about, in Allen's words, "the Eastern gray, urban green spaces, and us". Jason Daley, writing for Smithsonian, described the project as an "art/science/urban studies mash up".

Caroline Ross, a scientist who has studied animal census methods, noted that while citizen science projects such as the Squirrel Census are imperfect, "sometimes the sheer quantity of data you can get can really outweigh not having experts doing it." The Inman Park census data were used in a wildlife epidemiology paper on West Nile virus by researchers at Emory University.

The 2018 Central Park census resulted in a 37-page report that was sold by the organization for $75. The report included a vinyl record with an audio report, a map of the park, and themed baseball cards. All data from the census was released to the public, allowing people to create their own visualizations.
