= Zambezi River Authority =

Corporation administering the Kariba Dam

- Predecessor: Central African Power Corporation
- Formation: October 1, 1987; 39 years ago
- Type: IGO
- Purpose: Water/power resource management
- Headquarters: Lusaka, Zambia
- Website: www.zaraho.org.zm/index.html

The Zambezi River Authority (ZRA) is a corporation jointly and equally owned by the governments of Zambia and Zimbabwe.

It is governed by a four-person council consisting of the Ministers of Energy and Finance of each country. Its primary function is to operate and maintain the Kariba Dam on the Zambezi River. The ZRA was established in 1987 as a successor to the Central African Power Corporation, which had formerly managed power generation and transmission from the Kariba Dam.

== Zambezi River ==
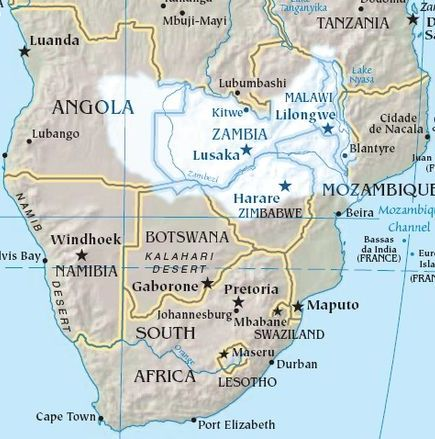
Zambezi River Basin

The Zambezi originates in northwestern Zambia, and runs west and then southwest through Angola before reentering Zambia. It flows south and forms part of the border between Zambia and Namibia. After picking up the waters of the Chobe River at the quadripoint where Zambia, Namibia, Botswana and Zimbabwe meet, the river flows east along the border between Zambia and Zimbabwe, powering the shared Kariba Dam hydroelectric station, before entering Mozambique and flowing to the Indian Ocean. The Zambezi basin also includes parts of Malawi and Tanzania. The Zambezi is the fourth largest river in Africa after the Nile, Congo and Niger.

== Functions ==
Functions of the ZRA, as laid out in the acts that created the body, include:

- Operate, monitor and maintain the Kariba Complex
- Investigate the desirability of constructing new dams on the Zambezi River
- Construct, operate, monitor and maintain any other dams on the Zambezi River
- Collect, accumulate and process hydrological and environmental data of the Zambezi River
- Make recommendations as will ensure the effective and efficient use of the waters and other resources of the Zambezi.

The Zambezi River Authority also plays a role in managing the use of water from Lake Kariba for irrigation and for domestic, industrial and institutional use.

== International claims ==
There has been tension between the countries that border the river. In the early 1990s, Zimbabwe proposed to build a pipeline to carry water south to supply the city of Bulawayo. Botswana also proposed to carry water south to Gaborone through an extension to the North-South Carrier (NSC). Some of the NSC water could be shared with South Africa. These projects raised concern with downstream countries threatened by loss of water. The question of claims on the Zambezi water by nations bordering the river were settled by the 1995 Southern African Development Community (SADC) protocol on shared watercourse systems and establishment of the Zambezi River Authority. However, the commitment of member governments to honor the agreement seems weak and may not stand up to the pressures of climate change.
