= Kariba Ferries =

Zimbabwean ferry operator

- Industry: Shipping
- Headquarters: Kariba, Zimbabwe
- Area served: Mlibizi, Kariba
- Services: Passenger and freight transportation
- Website: www.karibaferries.com

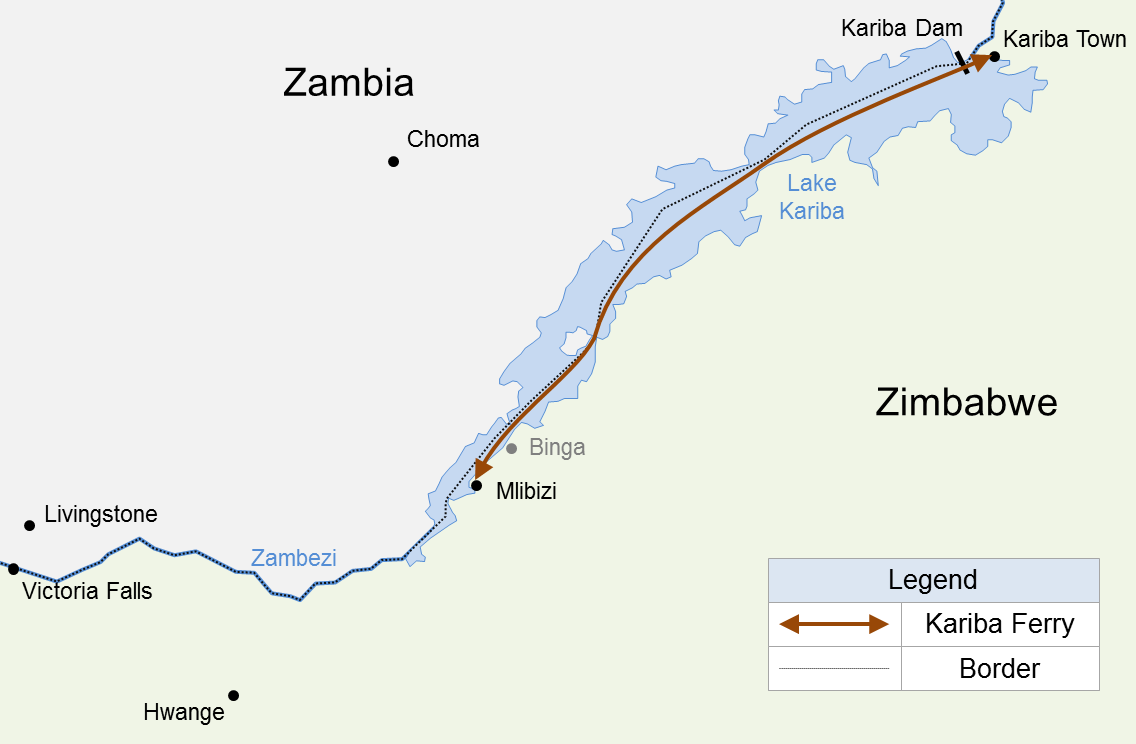
Kariba Ferry route

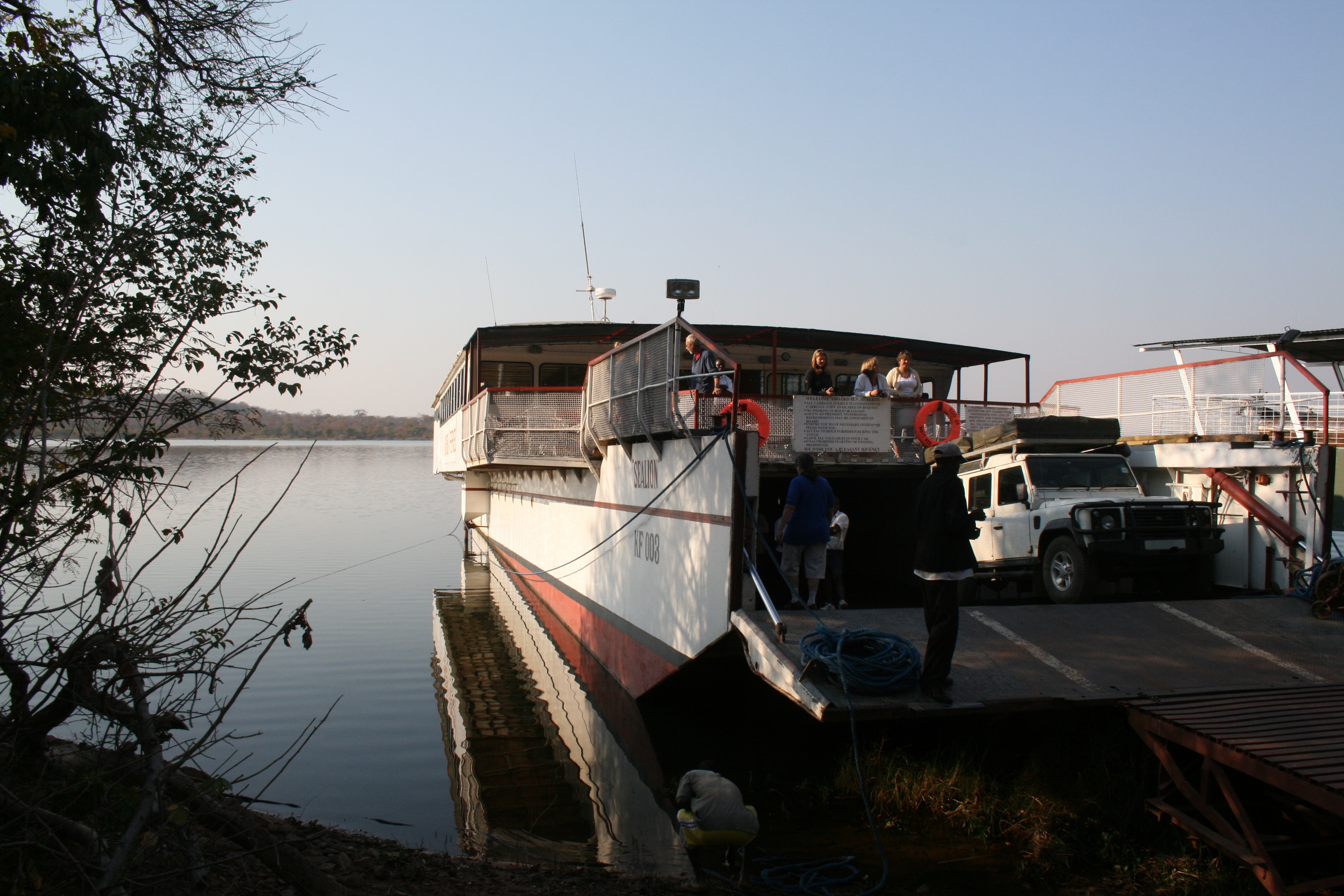
Kariba Ferry MV Sealion

Kariba Ferries is a Zimbabwean ferry operator which operates on Lake Kariba between the fishing camp of Mlibizi (with access to Victoria Falls) in the south and Kariba town in the north. It offers an alternative to an overland journey of 1,250 kilometres (780 miles) taking 8 hours. The relaxing voyage by boat takes approximately 22 hours.

== Catering ==
Catering is provided on board: three meals are served through the course of the voyage along with morning and afternoon tea with access to a cash bar on board.

== Fleet ==
Ship	Callsign	Built	Entered service	Route	Voyage time
MV Sealion	KF003	1974	1974	Kariba Town – Mlibizi Fishing Camp	22 Hours
