= Lake Kariba =

Reservoir in Zimbabwe

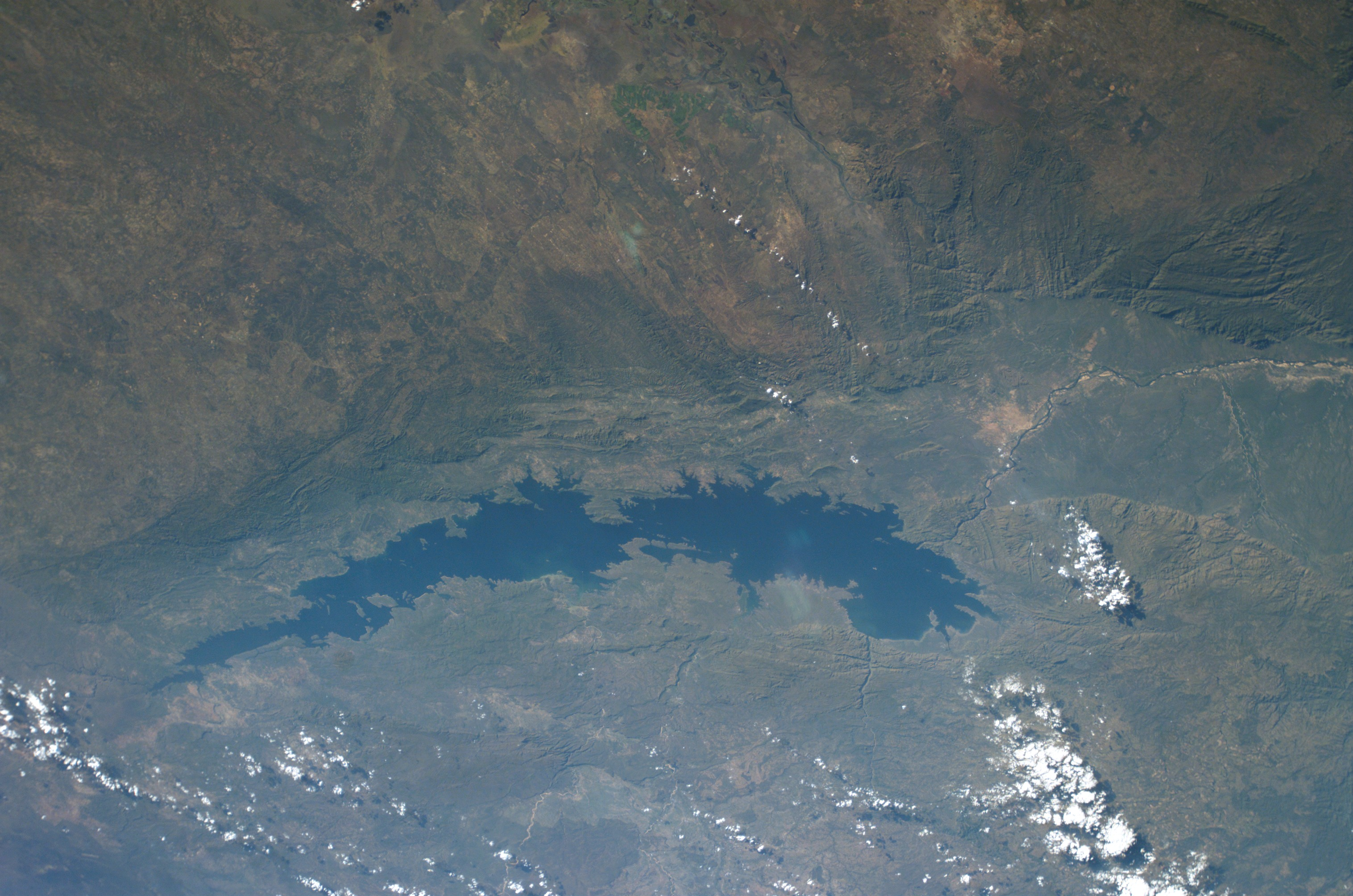

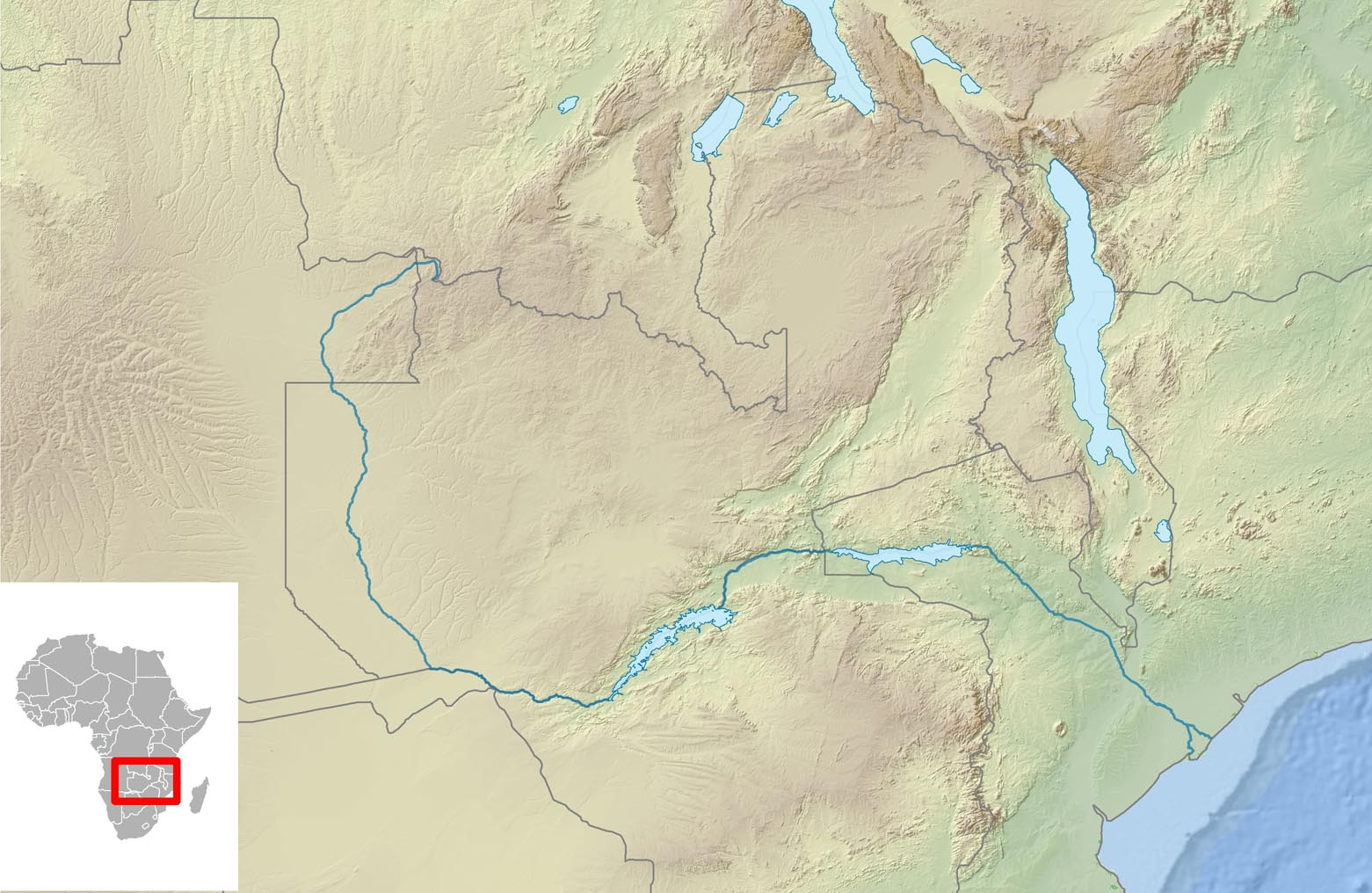
- Location within Zimbabwe Location within Zambezi River
- Coordinates: 16°54′S 28°00′E
- Lake type: Hydroelectric reservoir
- Catchment area: 663,000 km^{2} (256,000 sq mi)
- Basin countries: Zambia, Zimbabwe
- Max. length: 223 km (139 mi)
- Max. width: 40 km (25 mi)
- Surface area: 5,580 km^{2} (2,150 sq mi)
- Average depth: 29 m (95 ft)
- Max. depth: 97 m (318 ft)
- Water volume: 180 km^{3} (43 mi^{3})
- Surface elevation: 479 m (1,572 ft)
- Islands: Chete Island; Sekula; Chikanka

Lake Kariba is the world's largest artificial lake and reservoir by volume. It lies 1,300 kilometres (810 mi) upstream from the mouth of the Zambezi river on the Indian Ocean, bordering Zambia and Zimbabwe. Lake Kariba was filled between 1958 and 1963 following the completion of the Kariba Dam at its northeastern end, flooding the Kariba Gorge on the Zambezi River.

The Zimbabwean town of Kariba was built for construction workers on the dam, while some other settlements such as Binga village and Mlibizi in Zimbabwe and Siavonga and Sinazongwe in Zambia have expanded to house people displaced by the resulting lake.

On 11 August 2026, the ferry Mbuya Nehanda running from Kariba to Chalala capsized, resulting in the death of at least 97 people, including 18 children. It is believed to be one of the deadliest boat disasters in Zimbabwe's history.

== Physical characteristics ==
Lake Kariba is over 223 km (139 mi) long and up to 40 km (25 mi) in width. It covers an area of 5,580 km^{2} (2,150 sq mi) and its storage capacity is 185 km^{3} (44 cu mi). The mean depth of the lake is 29 m (95 ft); the maximum depth is 97 m (318 ft). It is the world's largest man-made reservoir by volume, four times as large as that created by the Three Gorges Dam. It was made on the orders of the government of the Federation of Rhodesia and Nyasaland. The enormous mass of water (Note: Approximately 180,000,000,000,000 kilograms, or 180 petagrams (180 billion tons).) is believed to have caused induced seismicity in the seismically active region, including over 20 earthquakes of greater than 5 magnitude on the Richter scale.

The lake has several islands, including Maaze Island, Mashape Island, Chete Island, Sekula, Sampa Karuma, Fothergill, Spurwing, Snake Island, Antelope Island, Bed Island, and Chikanka.

== Ecology ==
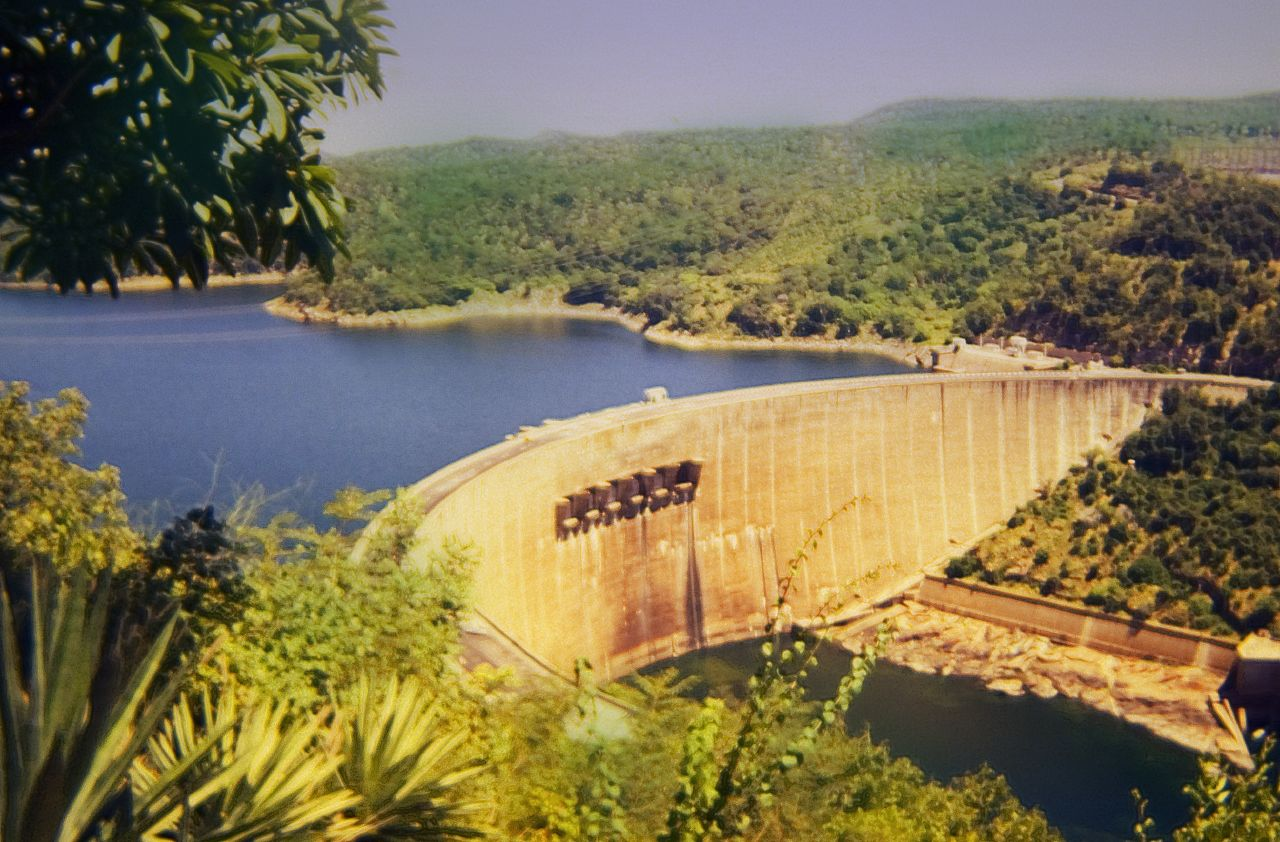
Kariba Dam

During the filling phase of the lake, the water was high in nutrients from decomposing inundated vegetation, creating a thick layer of fertile soil on land that became the lake bed. As a result, the ecology of Lake Kariba is vibrant. A number of fish species have been introduced to the lake, notably the sardine-like kapenta (transported from Lake Tanganyika), which now supports a thriving commercial fishery. Other inhabitants include the Nile crocodiles and hippopotamuses.

Gamefish, particularly tigerfish, which are indigenous to the Zambezi river system, now thrive on the kapenta, which in turn encourages tourism. Both Zambia and Zimbabwe are attempting to develop tourism along their respective shores.

Fish eagles, cormorants and other water birds patrol the shorelines, as do large numbers of elephants and other big game species including lion, cheetah, leopard, buffalo and a myriad of smaller plains game species. The southern Matusadona National Park was once a haven for black and white rhinoceros, but recent poaching activity has dramatically reduced their numbers.

== Protected areas ==
The portion of Lake Kariba which falls within Zimbabwe has been designated a recreational park within the Zimbabwe Parks and Wildlife Estate.

== See also ==
- Nyaminyami
- Kariba Town
- Kariba Ferries
- Lake Volta, the largest reservoir by surface area in the world
