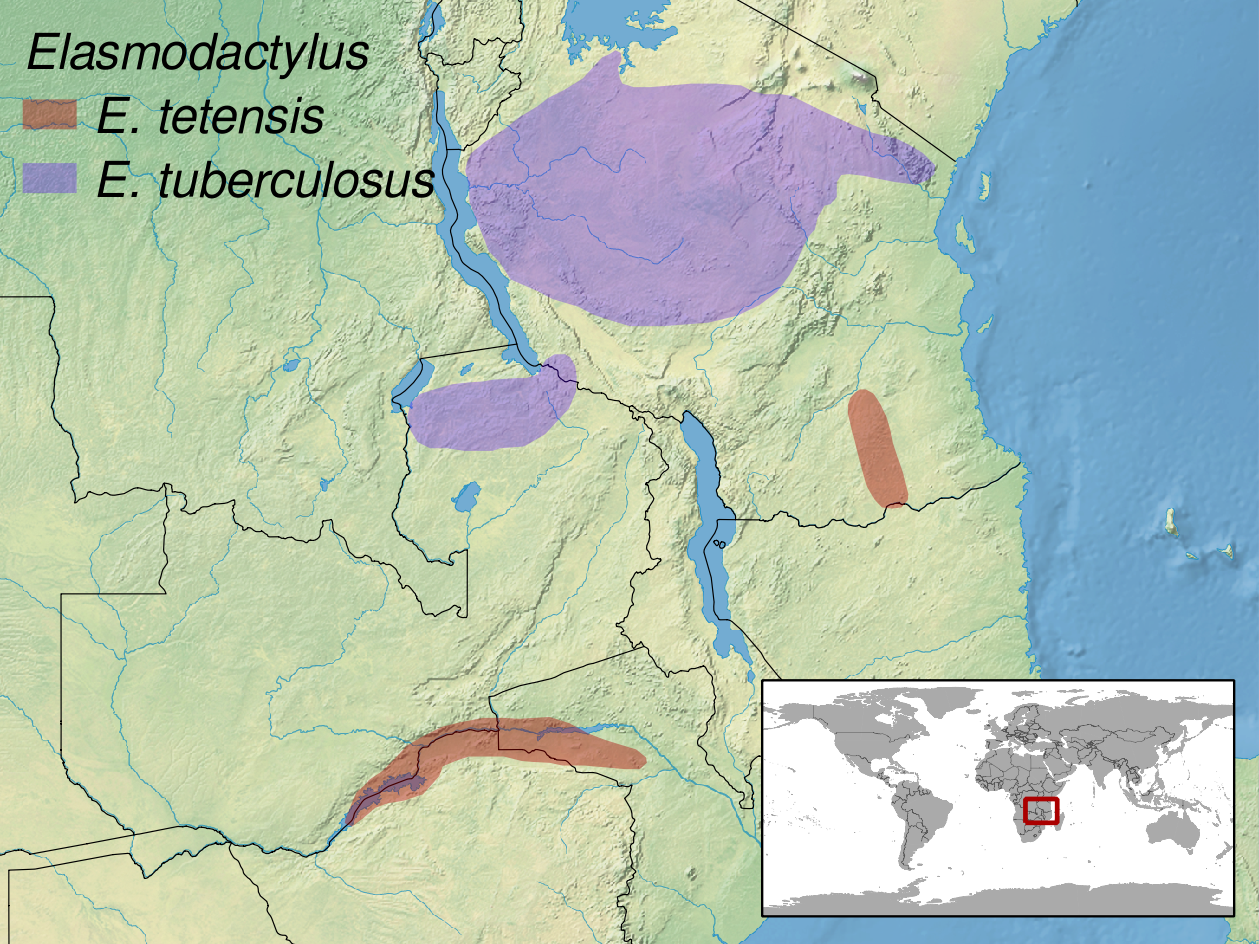
- Geographic distribution of the genus Elasmodactylus

Scientific classification
- Kingdom: Animalia
- Phylum: Chordata
- Class: Reptilia
- Order: Squamata
- Suborder: Gekkota
- Family: Gekkonidae
- Subfamily: Uroplatinae
- Genus: Elasmodactylus; Boulenger, 1895

Diversity
- Two species (see text)

= Elasmodactylus =

Genus of lizards

Elasmodactylus is a small genus of geckos from Africa. It currently has two species.

== Species ==
The two species are:

- Elasmodactylus tetensis — (Zambezi thick-toed gecko)
- Elasmodactylus tuberculosus — (warty thick-toed gecko)
