= Alfred McLaren =

American commander (1932–2025)

Alfred Scott McLaren (August 9, 1932 – September 19, 2025) was an American submarine commander, deep-sea explorer, and polar scientist. He led clandestine U.S. Navy missions during the Cold War, conducted groundbreaking Arctic research, and later became a prominent figure in maritime archaeology.
