= Mlibizi =

- Fishing Camp
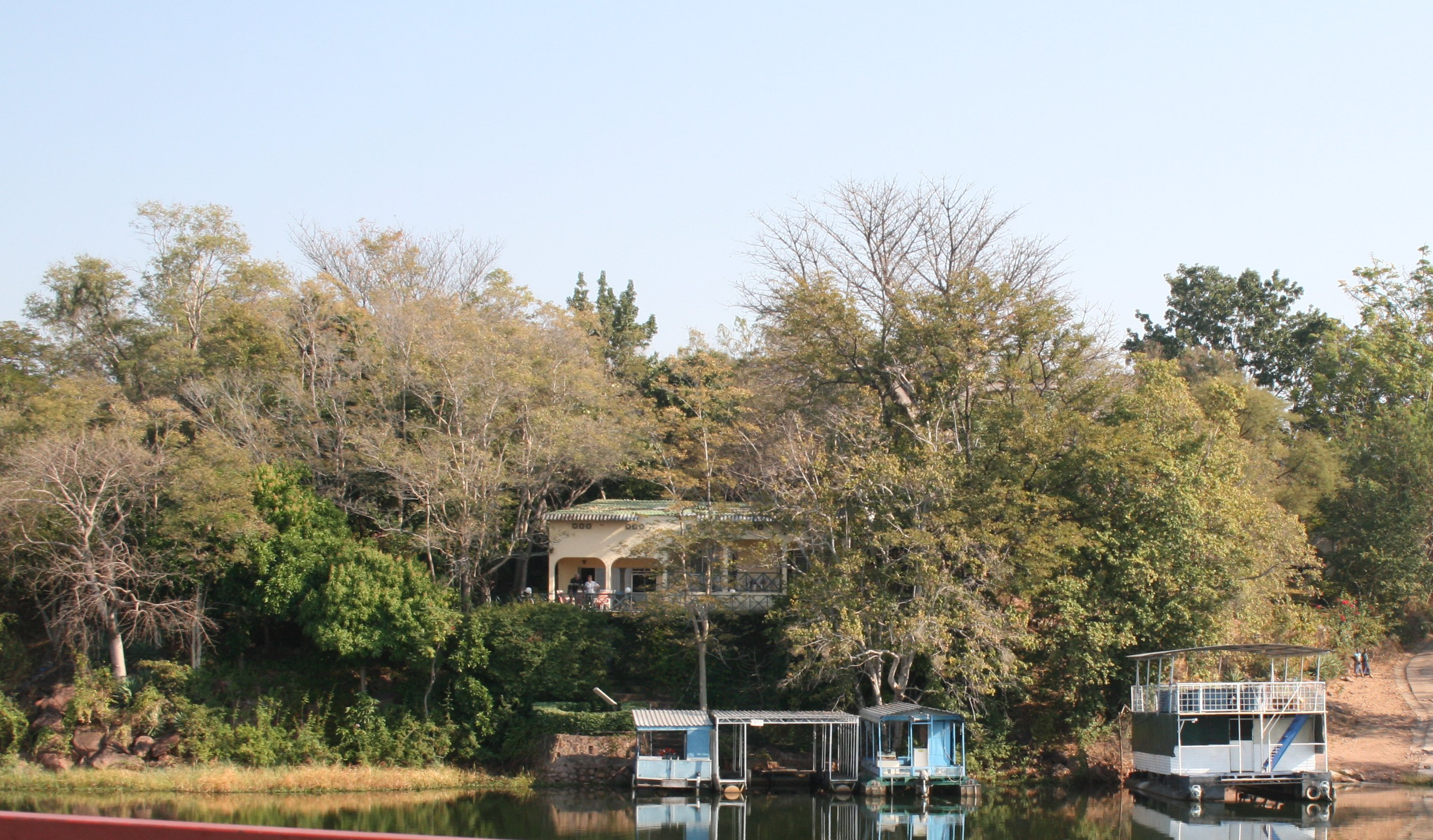
- Mlibizi Harbour

- Location within Zimbabwe
- Coordinates: 17°56′18.49″S 27°04′32.63″E
- Country: Zimbabwe
- Province: Matabeleland North
- District: Binga
- Elevation: 500 m (1,600 ft)
- Time zone: UTC+2 (CAT)

Mlibizi is a village on the southern shore of Lake Kariba. Mlibizi is situated in Matabeleland North province in Zimbabwe. Mlibizi is a popular fishing resort and is the terminal of the Kariba Ferries, which offers car and passenger ferry service.

== Mlibizi Aerodrome ==
A single untarred runway exists outside the camp for use by light aircraft.

== Kariba Ferries ==
Kariba Ferries is a company that operates car and passenger ferries from Kariba town to Mlibizi. In recent years their services have been disrupted but as of dollarisation in Zimbabwe they have resumed regular operations.
