= Henry Collins Walsh =

Historical journalist, historian, explorer (1863–1927)

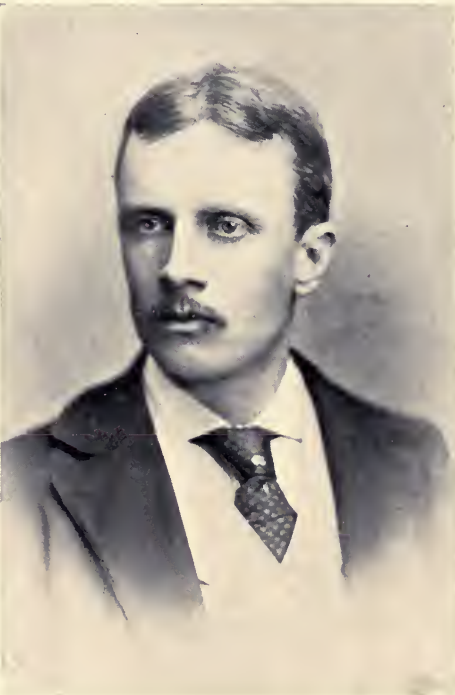
Photo of Henry Collins Walsh from his book The Last Cruise of the Miranda

Henry Collins Walsh (1863–1927) was a journalist, historian, explorer of Central America and Greenland, a founding member of the Arctic Club of America (1894), and the nominal founder of The Explorers Club (1904).

Walsh was born in Florence, Italy, in 1863, the son of Robert Walsh and Margaret Mullen. He lived in Italy until he was nine years old and then came to the United States where he was educated at Georgetown University and graduated in 1888. He entered newspaper work, obtaining a job at the Philadelphia Times, and later as the editor of the Mansfield, PA Advertiser and managing editor of the Catholic world magazine. He also served on the staff of the International Encyclopedia and was literary editor of Lippincott's magazine for three years.

He is associated with the Henry Altemus Company of Philadelphia.

== Edited works ==
- Dante's Inferno - Dante Alighieri
- Poems of John Milton
- Paradise Lost - John Milton
- Purgatory and Paradise - Dante Alighieri
- Account of the F.A. Cook arctic expedition via Labrador to Sukkertoppen
- The Rime of the Ancient Mariner - Samuel Taylor Coleridge
- Idylls of the King, and other Arthurian poems - Alfred Lord Tennyson
- American Notes and Queries, Volume 1

== Works by Walsh ==
- The Last Cruise of the Miranda - A Record of Arctic Adventure (1895)
- By the Potomac and Other Verses (1889)
