= Kariba Gorge =

Natural gorge in Zambia and Zimbabwe

Coordinates: 16°30′14″S 28°47′44″E

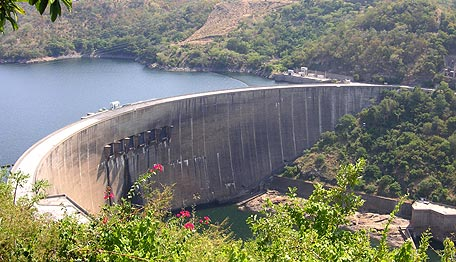
Kariba Dam in the Kariba Gorge

Kariba Gorge is a large, natural gorge through which flowed the Zambezi River on the border of Zambia and Zimbabwe, Africa. In 1959, the large double arch concrete Kariba Dam was completed, completely filling the gorge and creating the largest man-made lake in the world. Lake Kariba was filled between 1958 and 1963 following the completion of the Kariba Dam at its northeastern end, flooding the Kariba Gorge on the Zambezi River and displacing large numbers of wildlife and the local Tonga people.

== Effects ==
The choice of the Kariba Gorge over the competing Kafue Gorge site in Zambia (then Northern Rhodesia) was a result of political and technical decisions. The Kariba Gorge was assessed as more stable hydrologically, and the misgivings for the minority white government in Southern Rhodesia of depending economically on a dam built solely in Northern Rhodesia were therefore overcome. Further, environmental assessment was a rudimentary science at the time, and the relocation of the people on the Zimbabwe side of the gorge was not adequately planned and thousands were flooded out. A distinct cultural gap arose between the isolated Zimbabwe Tonga and the Zambia Tonga because of their separation by the massive lake filling the gorge. Today the Zimbabwe Tonga are considered a separate people with a somewhat different language and a lower economic status compared to the Tonga on the Zambia side.

== See also ==
- Kariba Dam
- Kariba Lake
