= Sinazongwe (constituency) =

Constituency of the National Assembly of Zambia

Sinazongwe is a constituency of the National Assembly of Zambia. It covers Sinazongwe, Sinazeze and Maamba in Sinazongwe District of Southern Province.

== List of MPs ==
Election year	MP	Party
Sinazongwe
1973	Maxwell Beyani	United National Independence Party
1978	Maxwell Beyani	United National Independence Party
1983	Dodson Syatalimi	United National Independence Party
1988	Dodson Syatalimi	United National Independence Party
1991	Syacheye Madyenkuku	Movement for Multi-Party Democracy
1996	Syacheye Madyenkuku	Movement for Multi-Party Democracy
2001	Raphael Muyunda	United Party for National Development
2006	Raphael Muyunda	United Party for National Development
2011	Richwell Siamunene	United Party for National Development
2016	Gift Sialubalo	United Party for National Development
2021	Gift Sialubalo	United Party for National Development
2026	Siakole Nchimunya	United Party for National Development
