= Kariba (Zambian parliamentary constituency) =

National Assembly constituency in Zambia

Kariba is a constituency of the National Assembly of Zambia. It was created in 2026 by splitting Sinazongwe constituency. It covers the western part of Sinazongwe District, including the town of Maamba.

== List of MPs ==
| Election year | MP | Party |
|---|---|---|
| 2026 | Gift Sialubalo | United Party for National Development |
