= Sinazongwe =

- Town
- Location within Zambia
- Coordinates: 17°15′00″S 27°28′00″E
- Country: Zambia
- Province: Southern Province
- District: Sinazongwe District
- Time zone: UTC+2 (CAT)

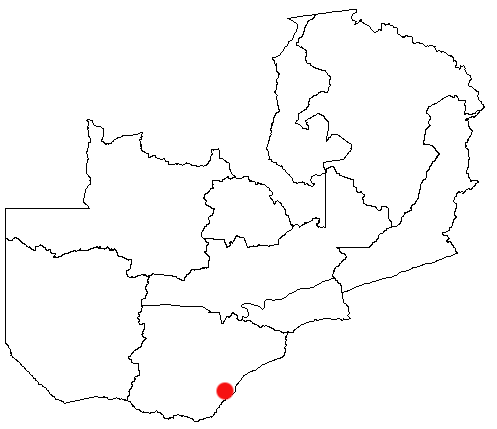
Location of Sinazongwe in Zambia

Sinazongwe is a town in the Southern Province of Zambia, lying on the north shore of Lake Kariba. It was founded in the 1950s as a local administrative centre, while its main industry now is kapenta fishing. It is home to a lighthouse and an airstrip, while ferries sail to Chete Island. Sinazongwe also boasts The Houseboat Company.

Sinazongwe is accessible by tar road from Batoka (which is between Pemba and Choma) and by 17 kilometres (11 mi) of gravel road just outside Sinazeze town. The nearest airstrip is approximately 6 kilometres (3.7 mi) from Sinazongwe. The nearest large hospital is at Maamba which is about a 40-minute drive from Sinazongwe; however, there is a small hospital in Sinazongwe as well as a local clinic.

Sinazongwe
