= Vincent Lilanda =

Zambian politician and businessman

Honorable Vincent Lilanda

Elected member of the National Assembly of Zambia
- Incumbent
- Assumed office August 2026
- President: Hakainde Hichilema
- Preceded by: Gary Nkombo
- Constituency: Mazabuka Central

Mayor of Mazabuka District
- In office August 2016 – May 2026
- Succeeded by: Kelvin Muleya

Personal details
- Born: Vincent Lilanda; August 28, 1978 (age 48) Zambia
- Party: United Party for National Development

Vincent Lilanda (born August 28) is a Zambian politician affiliated with the United Party for National Development (UPND). He was the Mayor of Mazabuka District from 2016 to 2026 and was subsequently elected to represent Mazabuka Central Constituency in the National Assembly in the August 2026 general election, succeeding Gary Nkombo.

== Political career ==
Lilanda was first elected as Mayor of Mazabuka District at the 2016 general election before being re-elected at the 2021 general election under the United Party for National Development (UPND). He served in the position for the 2016–2021 and 2021–2026 local government terms. Following his election to Parliament in 2026, he was succeeded as mayor by Kelvin Muleya, also of the UPND.

In 2026, he was adopted by the UPND as its candidate for Mazabuka Central Constituency in the general election. His candidacy came amid a political split involving incumbent MP Gary Nkombo, who resigned from the UPND in May 2026 and subsequently contested the seat as an independent candidate. Nkombo cited tensions within the party and his decision to stand as an independent in explaining his departure.

Lilanda won the parliamentary election with 20,420 votes, while Nkombo received 10,720 votes. He was declared the elected Member of Parliament for Mazabuka Central Constituency, succeeding Nkombo, who had represented the constituency for four consecutive terms (since 2006).
