= Mazabuka Central =

Constituency of the National Assembly of Zambia

Mazabuka Central is a constituency of the National Assembly of Zambia. It covers part of Mazabuka District in Southern Province, including the town of Mazabuka.

== List of MPs ==
Election year	MP	Party
Mazabuka
1964	Mufaya Mumbuna	Zambian African National Congress
1967 (by-election)	Lazarus Cheelo	United National Independence Party
1968	Herbert Mwinga	Zambian African National Congress
1973	Franklin Malawo	United National Independence Party
1978	Simon Maambo	United National Independence Party
1983	Patterson Haamane	United National Independence Party
1988	Bennie Mwiinga	United National Independence Party
1991	Bennie Mwiinga	Movement for Multi-Party Democracy
1996	Bennie Mwiinga	Movement for Multi-Party Democracy
1999 (by-election)	Kabisa Nang'omba	United Party for National Development
2001	Kabisa Nang'omba	United Party for National Development
Mazabuka Central
2006	Gary Nkombo	United Party for National Development
2011	Gary Nkombo	United Party for National Development
2016	Gary Nkombo	United Party for National Development
2021	Gary Nkombo	United Party for National Development
2026	Vincent Lilanda	United Party for National Development
