= Gift Sialubalo =

Zambian politician

Member of the National Assembly for Kariba
- Incumbent
- Assumed office August 2026

Minister of Local Government and Rural Development
- Incumbent
- Assumed office 28 March 2025
- President: Hakainde Hichilema
- Preceded by: Gary Nkombo

Member of the National Assembly for Sinazongwe
- In office August 2016 – May 2026
- Preceded by: Richwell Siamunene
- Succeeded by: Siakole Nchimunya

Personal details
- Born: Gift Simuunza Sialubalo; 25 August 1965 (age 61) Zambia
- Party: United Party for National Development

Gift Simuunza Sialubalo (born 25 August 1969) is a Zambian politician who currently serves as the Minister of Local Government and Rural Development and as the member of parliament for Kariba. He was the Member of Parliament for Sinazongwe from August 2016 to May 2026.

== Political Career ==
Sialubalo has served in Zambia's parliament since 2016, having been elected in both 2016 and 2021 as the United Party for National Development (UPND) candidate. His 2016 election was contested by his opponent, Richwell Siamunene, who claimed Sialubalo and his followers used violence and otherwise intimidated voters as well as spreading falsehoods. The court found that there was violence by and on behalf of Gift Sialubalo, but it did not arise to an actionable amount.

When, in 2020, some constituents labeled him an absentee representative, Sialubalo responded that he worked hard on development projects in the Sinazongwe area.

Ahead of the 2026 general election, Sinazongwe constituency was split into two constituencies, with one maintaining the name Sinazongwe and the other being named Kariba. Sialubalo chose Kariba constituency as the place to contest as the UPND parliamentary candidate. At the election on 13 August 2026, he was elected as the Kariba MP. In October 2026, he was re-appointed as the Minister of Local Government and Rural Development.
