= Kariba =

Kariba may refer to:

- Kariba, Zimbabwe
- Lake Kariba
- Kariba Dam
- Kariba Gorge
- Kariba (district)
- Kariba (Zambian parliamentary constituency)
- Kariba weed (or Kariba-weed), the Salvinia molesta plant
- For the 1982 Bahamian-flagged container ship Kariba, see MV Tricolor collision and sinking in 2002

== See also ==
- Kariba Route, in Japan
- Kariba suit
- 1676 Kariba
- Abu Karib, also known as "Abu Kariba Asad"
