= Gary Nkombo =

Zambian politician

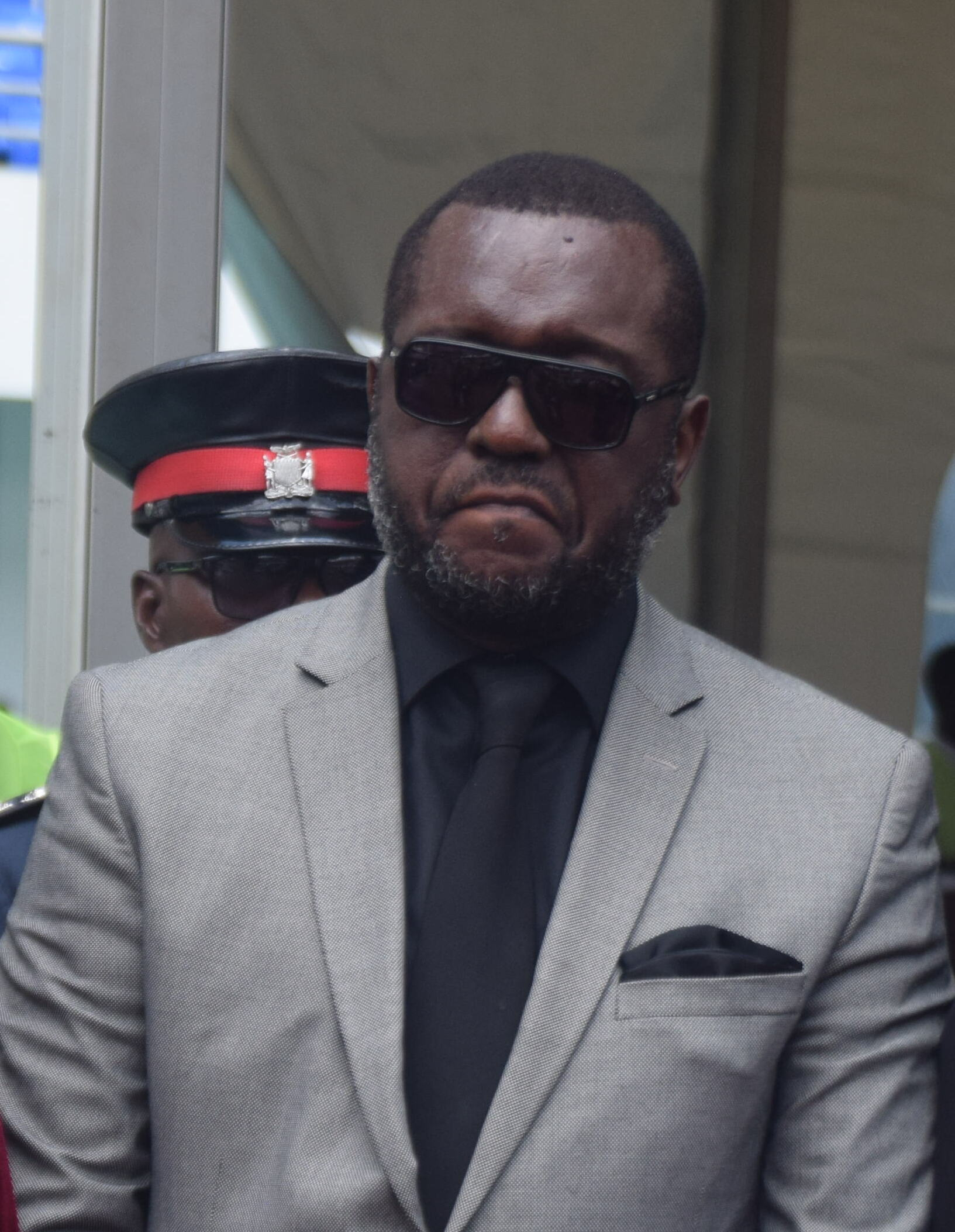
- Gary Nkombo in 2023

Minister of Local Government and Rural Development
- In office 7 September 2021 – 28 March 2025
- President: Hakainde Hichilema
- Preceded by: Charles Banda
- Succeeded by: Gift Sialubalo

Member of the National Assembly for Mazabuka Central
- In office 2006–2026
- Preceded by: Kabisa Nang'omba
- Succeeded by: Vincent Lilanda

Personal details
- Born: Gary Chilala Nkombo; 1 March 1965 (age 61) Mazabuka, Zambia
- Party: United Party for National Development (2006 - 2026)
- Spouse: Katendi Kapiña Nkombo

Gary Chilala Nkombo (born 1 March 1965) is a Zambian politician and businessman. He served as the member of parliament from Mazabuka Central from 2006 to 2016. He served as the Minister of Local Government and Rural Development from September 2021 to March 2025.

== Political career ==
Nkombo stood as the Movement for Multi-Party Democracy candidate in a by-election in Mazabuka Central in 1999 and he was not elected. He then stood as the Forum for Democracy and Development candidate in Mazabuka Central at the 2001 general election and he was not elected.

Nkombo was first elected as an MP in the 2006 Zambian general election representing Mazabuka Central in the National Assembly as a member of the United Party for National Development (UPND). He was again elected MP in the 2011, 2016 and 2021 Zambian general elections.

In August 2016 he was appointed Party Whip for the UPND.

In September 2021, Nkombo was appointed Minister of Local Government and Rural Development. On Friday, 28 March 2025, Gary Nkombo was terminated from his appointment as Minister of Local Government and Rural Development by president Hakainde Hichilema for unspecified reasons.

Members of the UPND close to the president suggested that he was removed for corruption. However, others in the party recognized his growing influence especially with those who disagree with the current administration’s direction, and suggest that his removal was more political – removal of a potential rival to Hakainde Hichilema, the president. Following his relief from the role of local government ministry, he explained that he had no hard feelings over the decision to drop him.

On 28 March 2026, Nkombo was dismissed as the party chairman for elections and was replaced by Likando Mufalali.

In May 2026, Nkombo applied to defend his parliamentary position in Mazabuka Central constituency at the 2026 general election as an independent candidate after citizens went to his home to convince him to participate. He proceeded the following month to resign from the United Party for National Development (UPND) in order to complete his independent candidature. At the election, he came second to Vincent Lilanda (the UPND candidate) in Mazabuka Central.

=== Timeline ===
Year (s)	Position	Area served	Political Party
2006 - 2011	Member of Parliament	Mazabuka Central	United Party for National Development
2011 - 2016	Member of Parliament	Mazabuka Central	United Party for National Development
2016 - 2021	Member of Parliament	Mazabuka Central	United Party for National Development
2021 - 2026	Member of Parliament	Mazabuka Central	United Party for National Development
2021 - 2025	Minister of Local Government and Rural Development	N/A	United Party for National Development

== Controversy ==
In 2022, Nkombo forced a woman brewing kachasu to drink it with her children. After a video circulated on social media, many people expressed disappointment in the minister. A few days later, he apologised to the family and was forgiven.

== Personal life ==
Nkombo was a teacher by profession, before becoming a politician and a businessman; he still maintains a small farm. He is married and has two sons and a daughter.
