= Sinazeze =

- Location within Zambia
- Coordinates: 17.133333°S 27.416667°E
- Country: Zambia
- Province: Southern Province
- District: Sinazongwe

Sinazeze (also known as Sinazezi) is a community located in Sinazongwe District in the Southern Province of Zambia. Sinazeze is about 17 kilometres (11 mi) north of Sinazongwe and 35 kilometres north-east of Maamba. Its location at a road junction has led to its development.

The Collum Coal Mine is located near the community.
