= Ila people =

Ethnic group

The Ila people are an ethnic group in The Republic of Zambia who make up 0.8 percent of the total population.

The Ila are closely related in language and culture to their more numerous Tonga neighbours in Southern Province. The Ila people mainly reside in Namwala District, which is the principal town for the Ila, Itezhi-Tezhi and Mumbwa districts spread across seventeen chiefdoms. Most Ila grow enough food to feed their families and to cover expenses for physical needs and their children's educational expenses. More educational and career opportunities are available in the larger towns and village centers. Some Ila raise animals such as chickens, goats, or pigs on a small scale, and mostly cows, though that is usually for tradition and prestige. In fact, the belief that cows are a sign of wealth and value undergirds an Ila funeral tradition. The funeral ceremony lasts several days. On the day after burial, cows are slaughtered. It is believed that the more that are killed, the greater the value of the dead person in the eyes of the community. Afterward, everyone goes home with enough meat to compensate for the time spent at the funeral.

== Origin ==
The Ila-speaking peoples and their neighbours on all sides belong to the Bantu subdivision of the Africans, and their ancestors in remote times must have come down from the southern Sudan. It may be judged from linguistic evidence, to separate lines of immigration. The Ba-ila in the main belong to the Eastern Bantu, and came into their present domain on the crest of a wave of emigration from the north-east, from the country around the southern end of Lake Tanganyika, where the Bantu found a new motherland, a second focus and radius of development. But they have were evidently influenced by, and to some extent intermixed with, peoples of another section, which, after passing from the north-east through the Congo territory towards the west coast, curled* back again towards the centre of the continent in a south-easterly direction. These statements are made on linguistic grounds. The closest affinities to Ila are found in a line of dialects stretching from the Subia on the Zambezi to the Bemba on Lake Tanganyika, and including midway the Tonga, Lenje, Bisa, and others. Many cult words, such as Leza (" the Supreme Being"), chisungu ("the pubertyrites"), are common to these dialects and are not known in the west; while in Ila we have such words as tonda (" taboo"), evidently brought from the west (cf. the Kele word orunda), and ifuka (" nine "), the root of which (buka) is found only among the West African Bantu. The Ba-ila. According to themselves, the pucka Ba-ila their region, called Bwila, as defined by themselves and as delineated on the map, is a small one. Like most African tribal names, it is difficult to determine its meaning.The word Ila, standing alone, may mean several things : it is a verb, " to go to " or " go for," and Ba-ila might mean " the people going off." Ila also means " a distended intestine," also " a grain of corn." But none of these is satisfactory. Ila is also one form of the verb zhila, " be taboo, set apart," corresponding to sacer, hagios, haram. It is an old Bantu root : Suto, ila; Zulu, zila; Ronga, yila; Herero, zera; Nyanja, yera; Upper Congo, kila cf.Ganda, omuzira, a totem. It occurs also in some tribal names, e.g. Bashilange. " they who taboo the leopard." This is, we think, the derivation of the name Ba-ila : " The people who are taboo, set apart "; they are the Hagioi; in short, the people. This certainly answers very well to the intelligent spirit of the people.

== Culture ==
The Ila People are well known for celebrating the Shimunenga traditional ceremony in Maala, Namwala district.

== See also ==
- Ila language
