= Collum Coal Mine =

Coal mine in Sinazeze, Zambia

- Location in Zambia
- Location: Sinazeze, Sinazongwe District, Southern Province, Zambia; 17.15°S 27.36°E
- Products: Coal
- Opened: 2000
- Company: Collum Mine Ltd

Collum Coal Mine is a coal mine in Sinazeze, Zambia. The mine is owned by five brothers from China, and was nationalised between 2012 and 2015 before being returned to the brothers.

It has been the location of violent labour disputes in 2010 and 2012.

== Description ==
The Collum Coal Mine is a coal mine in Sinazeze located approximately 325 km south of Lusaka.

== History ==
The coal deposit that form the mine was purchased from the Government of Zambia by Xu Jianxue and his four brothers from Jiangxi province of China in 2000. At the time, the mine was the country's first mine to excavate and process coal. The brothers managed the mine through their company Collum Mine Ltd.

In 2010, two Chinese mine managers were jailed after non-fatally shooting at least 13 miners who were striking. The October 15 protests centred around miner's request for higher pay.

In August 2012, 200 protestors (including miners, and their friends and families) protested for higher wages and improvements to mine safety. Protestors attacked a Chinese manager, complaining that he had replaced striking workers. They also killed Wu Shengzai and injured two other Chinese workers by deliberately pushing a trolley towards them.

In February 2012, the Government of Zambia nationalised the mine, citing safety concerns and unpaid taxes. The mine opened three years later, after being returned to the Xu brothers and managed by Xu Jain Xue.

In 2019, the mine's owners compensated local families impacted by the mine's tunnels.

== See also ==
- Mining in Zambia
- China–Zambia relations
