= Telephone numbers in Zambia =

- Zambia (dark green)
- Country: Zambia
- Continent: Africa
- NSN length: 9
- Country code: +260
- International access: 00
- Long-distance: 0

The following are the telephone codes in Zambia.

== Calling formats ==
To call in Zambia, the following format is used:

0yyy xxxxxx Calls within Zambia

Maximum Number Length excluding Country Code: 9 digits

Minimum Number Length excluding Country Code: 9 digits

== List of area codes in Zambia ==
LIST OF AREA CODES (2011)
LEADING DIGIT OF NATIONAL (SIGNIFICANT) NUMBER (N(S)N)	N(S)N NUMBER LENGTH		NUMBER ASSIGNMENT, AREA, OPERATOR
LEADING DIGIT OF NATIONAL (SIGNIFICANT) NUMBER (N(S)N)	Max No. of Digits	Min No. of Digits	NUMBER ASSIGNMENT, AREA, OPERATOR
GEOGRAPHIC
(0) 211	9	9	Geographic, Lusaka Province (ZAMTEL)
(0) 212	9	9	Geographic, Copperbelt Province,(ZAMTEL)
(0) 212	9	9	Geographic, Luapula Province, (ZAMTEL)
(0) 213	9	9	Geographic, Southern Province (ZAMTEL)
(0) 214	9	9	Geographic, Northern Province (ZAMTEL)
(0) 215	9	9	Geographic, Central Province (ZAMTEL)
(0) 216	9	9	Geographic, Eastern Province (ZAMTEL)
(0) 217	9	9	Geographic, Western Province (ZAMTEL)
(0) 218	9	9	Geographic, North Western Province (ZAMTEL)
.
MOBILE
(0) 95	9	9	Mobile Services (ZAMTEL)
(0) 96 or 76	9	9	Mobile Services (MTN)
(0) 97 or 77	9	9	Mobile Services (AIRTEL)
.
MOBILE Pre 2007
95	9	9	Mobile Services (CELL Z)
96	9	9	Mobile Services (MTN)
97	9	9	Mobile Services (AIRTEL)

== Older area code details ==
LIST OF AREA CODES (ITU 2007)
Old Area Code	New Area Code	Area/City
1	211	Lusaka
2	212	Ndola
3	213	Livingstone
4	214	Kasama
5	215	Kabwe
6	216	Chipata
7	217	Mongu
8	218	Solwezi

LIST OF AREA CODES (2007)
Area Code	Area/City
GEOGRAPHIC
+260 2 830 - 2 839	Samfya
+260 2 840	Matanda
+260 2 841	Chembe
+260 2 842	Kapalala
+260 2 843	Mukosa
+260 2 844	Milambo
+260 2 845	Mwewa
+260 2 846	Kalaba
+260 2 850	Chilubi Island
+260 2 96X	Kawambwa
+260 2 970	Mwense
+260 2 971	Mwense

LIST OF AREA CODES (PRE-2007)
Area Code	Area/City
1	Lusaka
2	Chingola
2	Kitwe
2	Luanshya
2	Ndola
3	Livingstone
5	Kabwe
7	Mongu
