= Shimunenga =

Shimunenga is a ceremony of the Ba-Ila people of Maala in Namwala District, Zambia. It is celebrated on the weekend of the full moon in September or October. It is named after the legendary warrior Shimunenga, who won a battle for the people's territory against his brother.

Early in the morning of the first day, people gather at the shrine of Shimunenga, to chant traditional songs. There is also a cultural march of women and girls in traditional attire, followed by performances by traditional dancers.

On the following morning, a drum sounds and animals are taken to the river, where cattle are displayed in the traditional manner. The first cattle to cross the river will be those of the custodian of the shrine. This is followed by a demonstration of a mock lion hunt and pelican fishing. The occasion is marked with traditional songs in honour and praise of the Shimunenga ancestral spirits. Celebrations continue in the village with pit-stops for traditional beer at different places.
