= Mbunda Lukwakwa =

Mbunda Lukwakwa Traditional Ceremony is celebrated by the Mbunda under Senior Chief Sikufele, during the first week of October every year at Manyinga of Kabompo District in North Western Zambia.

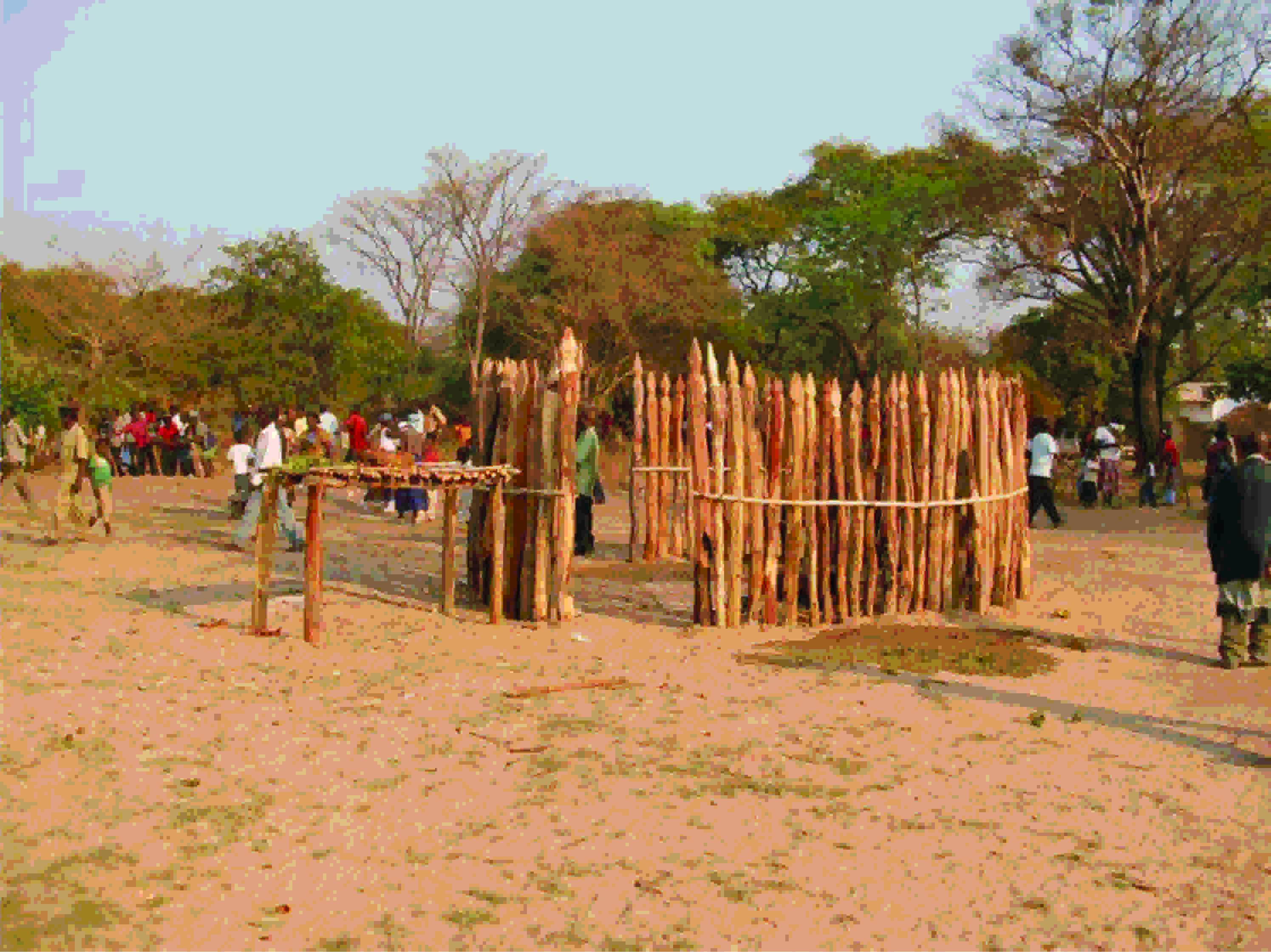
Mbunda Lukwakwa Symbolic Fence, Mbunda used to surround their villages for protection from their enemies

== Meaning ==
The ceremony commemorates the Mbunda conquests as they fought alongside the Aluyi in support of Prince Mubukwanu, one of the sons of the Aluyi King Mulambwa. It also gives thanks to their Creator the Almighty God for the blessings on them in providing good harvest the past months according to His Love.

== Celebration duration and activities ==
The ceremony is celebrated over three days. On the first day, from late in the evening, all the way throughout the night, men sing and dance at the Mukanda circumcision camp, in preparation for the resurrection of the Makishi from the graveyard early in the morning. On the second day, a Makishi masquerade is performed from the Manyinga grave yard in the east, all the way along the Mutanda Chavuma Road to the Senior Chief's palace, where the Makishi pay homage to the Senior Chief. This is followed up by the Makishi dancing the whole day, followed by traditional entertainment the whole evening and throughout the night.

On the third and climax day, Senior Chief Sikufele makes an appearance to the audience gathered in the main arena, accompanied by Government officials that have come to grace the occasion. The Mbunda Speaking People then perform some rituals in the symbolic Lukwakwa fence erected in the middle of the main arena, signifying their military prowess during their travels and conquests. They also praise their Almighty God by dancing their traditional dances such as Kalukuta, Shombe, Chinjangila, Chisho, Nduko and watching dances performed by their not less than fifty (50) exclusive Mbunda Makithi Artifacts.

Additionally the Mbunda showcase their traditional works such as, Iron Ore smelting, wood carvings, basketry and different kinds of handcrafts which are up for sale immediately after the ceremony.

The Mbunda people value their culture and believe, it is one channel of teaching their offspring to respect the older generation and good dressing manners.

== See also ==
- Mbunda Kingdom
- Mbunda language
- Mbunda people
- List of The Rulers of the Mbunda Kingdom
- List of Mbunda Chiefs in Zambia
