= Maamba =

- Town
- Location within Zambia
- Coordinates: 17.366667°S 27.15°E
- Country: Zambia
- Province: Southern
- District: Sinazongwe

Maamba is a town located in Sinazongwe District in the Southern Province, Zambia. It is about 35 kilometres south-west of Sinazeze and about 250 km south-west of the capital city of Zambia, Lusaka.

Maamba is a coal mining town with about 13000 residents.

== History ==
Maamba gets its name from the Lozi Tribe, meaning talkative person.

The CORRECT background to the name is the following:"Maamba" is a Ci Tonga language word. It is the plural of the word "Jamba" which means "a hoe".Thus "maamba" translates as "hoes".It means 'Place where hoes are (and historically were) made and are obtainable'.Ci Tonga is the language spoken in the Southern Province of Zambia and in the Districts of Northern Zimbabwe on the shores of Lake Kaliba (now called Kariba)from the Dam to Mosi oa tunya (the Victoria Falls). Thank you, Mwindaace Siamwiza, Born and Raised on the banks of the Zambezi river ~20 km from Maamba; June 11, 2024.

== Maamba Coal Mine ==
Maamba is the home to the largest Coal Plant in Zambia at 300MW, built for U$750million and operated by Maamba Collieries Limited (MCL) which as of 2010 is 100% owned by Nava Bharat Ventures Limited (NVBL) of India.

In 2021, Maamba Collieries Limited announced they were interested in increasing the capacity from 300 to 600MW.
