= Sinazongwe District =

Coordinates: 17°22′S 27°17′E

- District
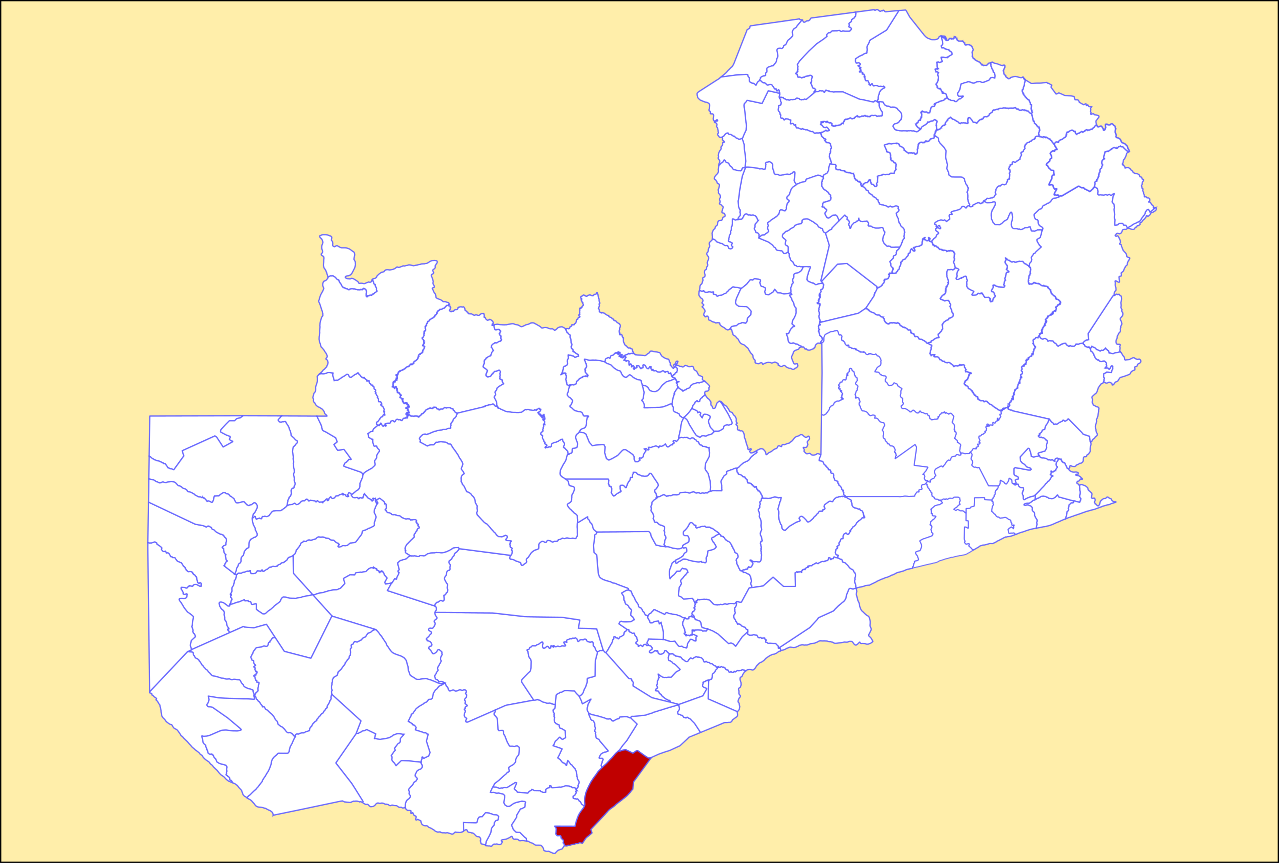
- District location in Zambia
- Country: Zambia
- Province: Southern Province
- Capital: Sinazongwe

Area
  - Total: 4,813.6 km^{2} (1,858.5 sq mi)

Population (2022)
  - Total: 159,055
  - Density: 33.043/km^{2} (85.581/sq mi)
- Time zone: UTC+2 (CAT)

Sinazongwe District is a district of Zambia, located in Southern Province. The capital lies at Sinazongwe. As of the 2022 Zambian Census, the district had a population of 159,055 people.
