= Zambia =

Country in Southern Africa

Republic of Zambia
- Flag Coat of arms
- Motto: "One Zambia, One Nation"
- Anthem: "Stand and Sing of Zambia, Proud and Free"
- Public Seal

- Capital and largest city: Lusaka; 15°25′S 28°17′E
- Official languages: English
- Recognised regional languages: List: 34.0% Bemba; 12.8% Tonga; 11.4% Nyanja; 6.7% Chewa; 5.4% Lozi; 2.6% Nsenga; 2.5% Tumbuka; 2.3% Kaonde; 2.1% Lunda; 1.9% English; 1.6% Luvale; 1.5% Lamba; 1.4% Lala; 1.2% Mambwe; 1.2% Namwanga; 1.1% Lenje; 10.2% Others
- Ethnic groups (2022): List: 25.4% Bemba; 14.9% Tonga; 8.9% Chewa; 6.5% Lozi; 4.2% Tumbuka; 4.0% Nsenga; 3.2% Ngoni; 3.1% Kaonde; 2.8% Lunda; 2.7% Namwanga; 2.5% Lala; 2.3% Luvale; 2.3% Mambwe; 1.9% Lamba; 1.5% Bisa; 1.1% Bisa people; 1.1% Mbunda; 1.0% Senga; 9.4% other ethnicities
- Religion (2022): 98.0% Christianity (official); 74.5% Protestantism; 17.9% Catholicism; 5.6% Jehovah's Witnesses; 0.5% Islam; 0.2% Traditional; 0.3% other; 1.3% none
- Demonym: Zambian
- Government: Unitary presidential republic
  - President: Hakainde Hichilema
  - Vice-President: Mutale Nalumango
  - Speaker: Nelly Mutti
  - Chief Justice: Mumba Malila
- Legislature: National Assembly of Zambia

Independence from the United Kingdom
  - Declared: 24 October 1964

Area
  - Total: 752,617 km^{2} (290,587 sq mi) (38th)
  - Water (%): 1

Population
  - 2023 estimate: ▲20,216,029 (64th)
  - Density: 17.2/km^{2} (44.5/sq mi) (191st)
- GDP (PPP): 2023 estimate
  - Total: ▲$83.687 billion (100th)
  - Per capita: ▲$4,068 (155th)
- GDP (nominal): 2023 estimate
  - Total: ▼$29.536 billion (113th)
  - Per capita: ▼$1,435 (159th)
- Gini (2022): ▼51.5 high inequality
- HDI (2023): ▲0.595 medium (154th)
- Currency: Zambian kwacha (ZMW)
- Time zone: UTC+2 (CAT)
- Date format: dd/mm/yyyy
- Calling code: +260
- ISO 3166 code: ZM
- Internet TLD: .zm

Zambia (/ˈzæmbiə, ˈzɑːm-/), officially the Republic of Zambia, is a landlocked country in Southern Africa. It is bordered to the north by the Democratic Republic of the Congo, Tanzania to the northeast, Malawi to the east, Mozambique to the southeast, Botswana (via a tiny border of Chobe District) and Zimbabwe to the south, Namibia (via the Caprivi Strip) to the southwest, and Angola to the west. The capital city of Zambia is Lusaka, located in the south-central part of Zambia. The population is concentrated mainly around Lusaka in the south and the Copperbelt Province to the north, the core economic hubs of Zambia.

Originally inhabited by Khoisan peoples, the region was affected by the Bantu expansion of the thirteenth century. Following European expeditions in the eighteenth century, the British Empire began to consolidate control of the area following the 1890 British Ultimatum against the Portuguese, who had claimed the area between Angola and Mozambique in the 1885 Pink Map. Britain formed the British protectorates of Barotziland–North-Western Rhodesia and North-Eastern Rhodesia towards the end of the nineteenth century. These were merged in 1911 to form Northern Rhodesia. For most of the colonial period, Zambia was governed by an administration appointed from London with the advice of the British South Africa Company.

On 24 October 1964, Zambia became independent of the United Kingdom as a republic in the Commonwealth, and prime minister Kenneth Kaunda became the inaugural president. Kaunda's socialist United National Independence Party (UNIP) maintained power from 1964 until 1991, with him playing a role in regional diplomacy, cooperating with the United States in search of solutions to conflicts in Southern Rhodesia (Zimbabwe), Angola, and Namibia. From 1972 to 1991, Zambia was a one-party state with UNIP as the sole legal political party under the motto "One Zambia, One Nation" coined by Kaunda. Following the introduction of a multiparty system in the early 1990s, Kaunda was defeated in the 1991 Zambian general election. Zambia has since continued to experience peaceful transitions of power.

Natural resources in Zambia include minerals, wildlife, forestry, freshwater, and arable land. As of an estimate in 2018, 47.9% of the population is affected by multidimensional poverty. The Common Market for Eastern and Southern Africa (COMESA) is headquartered in Lusaka.

== Etymology ==
The territory of Zambia was known as "Northern Rhodesia" from 1911 to 1964. It was renamed "Zambia" in October 1964 on its independence from British rule. The name "Zambia" derives from the Zambezi river (Zambezi may mean "the grand river").

== History ==
This is the history of the region that became the Republic of Zambia on 24 October 1964.

=== Prehistory ===
The fossil skull remains of the Broken Hill Man (also known as Kabwe Man), dated between 300,000 and 125,000 years BC, further shows that the area was inhabited by early humans.

=== Khoisan and Batwa ===
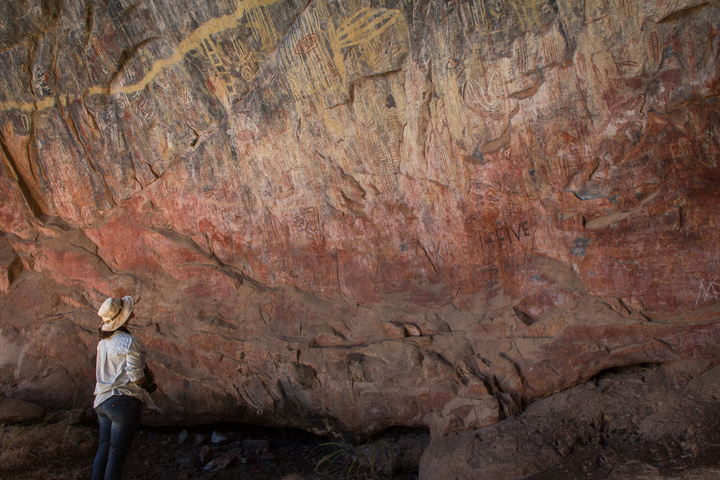
Graffitied rock art in Nsalu Cave, Kasanka National Park in North-Central Zambia

Zambia once was inhabited by the Khoisan and Batwa peoples until around AD 300, when migrating Bantu began to settle the areas. It is believed the Khoisan people originated in East Africa and spread southwards around 150,000 years ago. The Twa people were split into two groups: the Kafwe Twa lived around the Kafue Flats and the Lukanga Twa who lived around the Lukanga Swamp. Many examples of ancient rock art in Zambia, like the Mwela Rock Paintings, Mumbwa Caves, and Nachikufu Cave, are attributed to these early hunter-gatherers.

=== The Bantu (Abantu) ===
The early history of the peoples of Zambia is deduced from oral records, archaeology, and written records, mostly from non-Africans.

==== Bantu origins ====
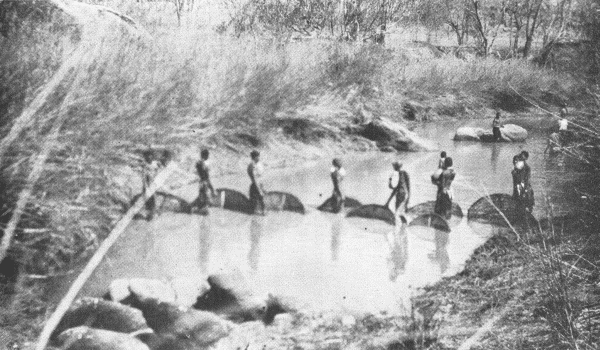
Batonga fisherwomen in Southern Zambia.

The Bantu people originally lived in West and Central Africa around what is today Cameroon and Nigeria. Approximately 5000 years ago, they began a millennia-long expansion into much of the continent. This event has been called the Bantu expansion; it was one of the largest human migrations in history. The Bantu are believed to have been the first to have brought iron working technology into large parts of Africa. The Bantu Expansion happened primarily through two routes: a western one via the Congo Basin and an eastern one via the African Great Lakes.

==== First Bantu settlement ====
The first Bantu people lived in villages. They lacked an organised unit under a chief or headman and worked as a community and helped each other in times of field preparation for their crops. Villages moved around as the soil became exhausted as a result of the slash-and-burn technique of planting crops. The people kept herds of cattle.

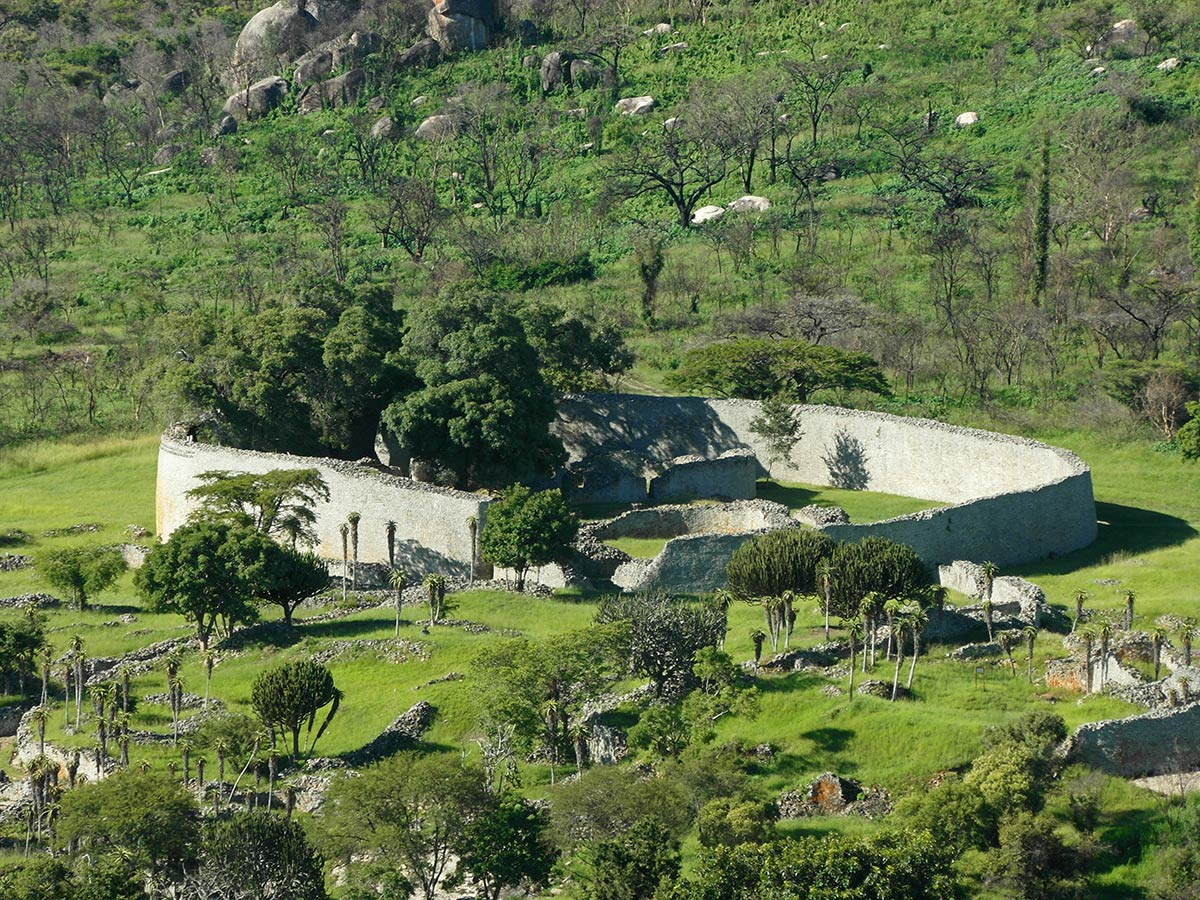
Ruins of Great Zimbabwe. Kalanga/Shona rulers of this kingdom dominated trade at Ingombe Ilede.

The first Bantu communities in Zambia were highly self-sufficient. Early European missionaries who settled in Southern Zambia noted the independence of these Bantu societies. One of these missionaries noted: "[If] weapons for war, hunting, and domestic purposes are needed, the [Tonga] man goes to the hills and digs until he finds the iron ore. He smelts it and with the iron thus obtained makes axes, hoes, and other useful implements. He burns wood and makes charcoal for his forge. His bellows are made from the skins of animals and the pipes are clay tile, and the anvil and hammers are also pieces of the iron he has obtained. He moulds, welds, shapes, and performs all the work of the ordinary blacksmith".

Goods traded at the major trading hub of Ingombe Ilede included fabrics, beads, gold, and bangles. The site itself is located at the confluence of the Zambezi and Lusitu rivers, making it ideal for long-distance trade. Denizens imported items from what is today southern Democratic Republic of Congo and Kilwa Kisiwani while others came from as far away as India, China and the Arab world. The African traders were later joined by the Portuguese in the 16th century.

==== Second Bantu settlement ====
The second mass settlement of Bantu people into Zambia was of people groups that are believed to have taken the western route of the Bantu migration through the Congo Basin. These Bantu people spent the majority of their existence in what is later the Democratic Republic of Congo.

===== Luba-Lunda states =====
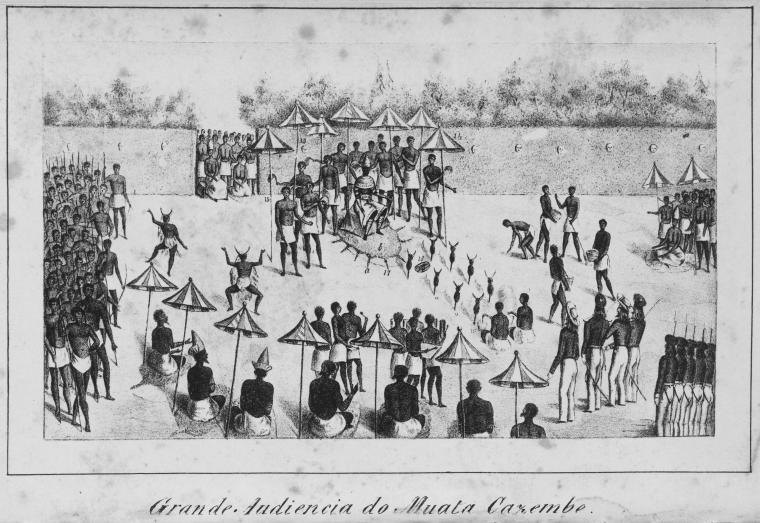
Drawing of the ruler of Lunda, Mwata Kazembe, receiving Portuguese in the royal courtyard in the 1800s

The Bemba, along with other related groups such as the Lamba, Bisa, Senga, Kaonde, Swaka, Nkoya and Soli, formed integral parts of the Luba Kingdom in Upemba part of the Democratic Republic of Congo and have a strong relation to the Luba people. The area which the Luba Kingdom occupied has been inhabited by early farmers and iron workers since the AD 300s.

Over time, these communities learned to use nets and harpoons, make dugout canoes, clear canals through swamps and make dams as high as 2.5 meters (8 ft 2 in). As a result, they grew a diverse economy trading fish, copper and iron items and salt for goods from other parts of Africa, like the Swahili coast and, later on, the Portuguese. From these communities arose the Luba Kingdom in the 14th century.

The Luba Kingdom was a large kingdom with a centralised government and smaller independent chiefdoms. It had large trading networks that linked the forests in the Congo Basin and the mineral-rich plateaus of what is today Copperbelt Province and stretched from the Atlantic coast to the Indian Ocean coast. The arts were also held in high esteem in the kingdom, and artisans were held in high regard.

Literature was well developed in the Luba Kingdom. One renowned Luba genesis story that articulated the distinction between two types of Luba emperors goes as follows:

Nkongolo Mwamba, the red king, and Ilunga Mbidi Kiluwe, a prince of legendary black complexion. Nkongolo Mwamba is the drunken and cruel despot, Ilunga Mbidi Kiluwe the refined and gentle prince. Nkongolo the Red is a man without manners, a man who eats in public, gets drunk, and cannot control himself, whereas [Ilunga] Mbidi Kiluwe is a man of reservation, obsessed with good manners; he does not eat in public, controls his language and his behaviour, and keeps a distance from the vices and modus vivendi of ordinary people. Nkongolo Mwamba symbolises the embodiment of tyranny, whereas Mbidi Kiluwe remains the admired caring and compassionate kin.

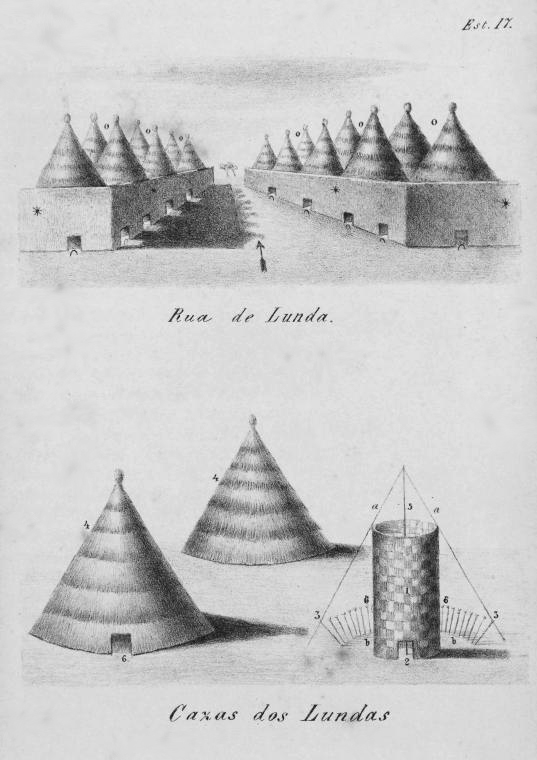
A drawing of Lunda houses by a Portuguese visitor. The size of the doorways relative to the building emphasizes the scale of the buildings.

In the same region of Southern Congo, the Lunda people were made into a satellite of the Luba empire and adopted forms of Luba culture and governance, thus becoming the Lunda Empire to the south. According to Lunda genesis myths, a Luba hunter named Chibinda Ilunga, son of Ilunga Mbidi Kiluwe, introduced the Luba model of statecraft to the Lunda sometime around 1600 when he married a local Lunda princess named Lueji and was granted control of her kingdom. Most rulers who claimed descent from Luba ancestors were integrated into the Luba empire. The Lunda kings, however, remained separate and actively expanded their political and economic dominance over the region.

The Lunda, like its parent state Luba, also traded with both coasts, the Atlantic and Indian Oceans. While ruler Mwaant Yaav Naweej had established trade routes to the Atlantic coast and initiated direct contact with European traders eager for slaves and forest products and controlling the regional Copper trade, and settlements around Lake Mweru regulated commerce with the East African coast.

The Luba-Lunda states eventually declined as a result of both Atlantic slave trade in the west and Indian Ocean slave trade in the east and wars with breakaway factions of the kingdoms. The Chokwe, a group that is closely related to the Luvale and formed a Lunda satellite state, initially suffered from the European demand for slaves, but once they broke away from the Lunda state, they themselves became notorious slave traders, exporting slaves to both coasts.

The Chokwe eventually were defeated by the other ethnic groups and the Portuguese. This instability caused the collapse of the Luba-Lunda states and a dispersal of people into various parts of Zambia from the Democratic Republic of the Congo. The majority of Zambians trace their ancestry to the Luba-Lunda and surrounding Central African states.

===== The Maravi Confederacy =====
In the 1200s, before the founding of the Luba-Lunda states, a group of Bantu people started migrating from the Congo Basin to Lake Mweru then finally settled around Lake Malawi. These migrants are believed to have been one of the inhabitants around the Upemba area in the Democratic Republic of Congo. By the 1400s these groups of migrants collectively called the Maravi, and most prominently among them was the Chewa people who started imitating other Bantu groups like the Tumbuka.

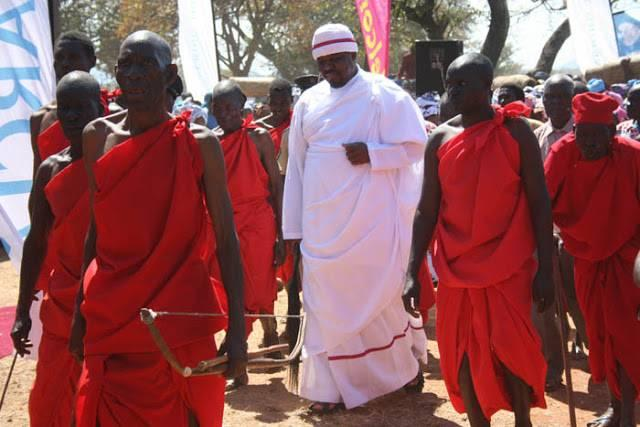
The kalonga (ruler) of the Chewa today descends from the kalonga of the Maravi Empire.

In 1480 the Maravi Empire was founded by the kalonga (paramount chief of the Maravi) from the Phiri clan, one of the main clans, with the others being Banda, Mwale and Nkhoma. The Maravi Empire stretched from the Indian Ocean through what today is Mozambique to Zambia and central parts of Malawi. The political organisation of the Maravi resembled that of the Luba and is believed to have originated from there. The primary export of the Maravi was ivory, which was transported to Swahili brokers.

Iron was also manufactured and exported. In the 1590s the Portuguese endeavoured to take monopoly over Maravi export trade. This attempt was met with outrage by the Maravi of Lundu, who unleashed their WaZimba armed force. The WaZimba sacked the Portuguese trade towns of Tete, Sena and various other towns.

The Maravi are also believed to have brought the traditions that would become Nyau secret society from Upemba. The Nyau form the cosmology or indigenous religion of the people of Maravi. The Nyau society consists of ritual dance performances and masks used for the dances; this belief system spread around the region.

The Maravi declined as a result of succession disputes within the confederacy, attack by the Ngoni and slave raids from the Yao.

===== Mutapa Empire and Mfecane =====
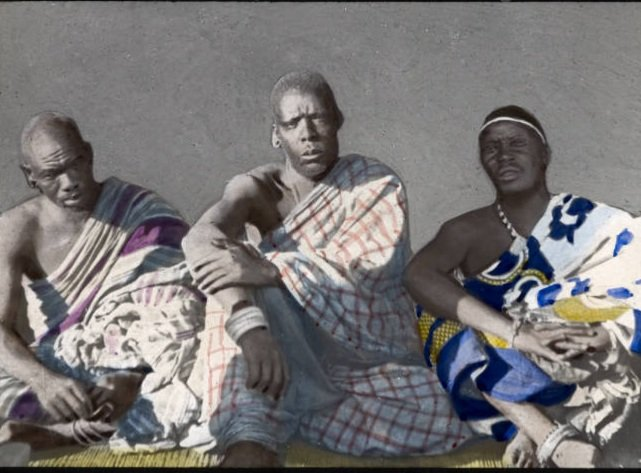
Three young Ngoni chiefs. The Ngoni made their way into Eastern Zambia from KwaZulu in South Africa. They eventually assimilated into the local ethnic groups.

As Great Zimbabwe was in decline, one of its princes, Nyatsimba Mutota, broke away from the state forming a new empire called Mutapa. The title of Mwene Mutapa, meaning "Ravager of the Lands", was bestowed on him and subsequent rulers.

The Mutapa Empire ruled territory between the Zambezi and Limpopo rivers, in what is now Zambia, Zimbabwe and Mozambique, from the 14th to the 17th century. By its peak, Mutapa had conquered the Dande area of the Tonga and Tavara. The Mutapa Empire predominately engaged in the Indian Ocean transcontinental trade with and via the WaSwahili. The primary exports were gold and ivory for silk and ceramics from Asia.

Like their contemporaries in Maravi, Mutapa had problems with the arriving Portuguese traders. The peak of this uneasy relationship was reached when the Portuguese attempted to influence the kingdoms internal affairs by establishing markets in the kingdom and converting the population to Christianity. This action caused outrage by the Muslim WaSwahili living in the capital, this chaos gave the Portuguese the excuse they were searching for to warrant an attack on the kingdom and try to control its gold mines and ivory routes. This attack failed when the Portuguese succumbed to disease along the Zambezi river.

In the 1600s internal disputes and civil war began the decline of Mutapa. The weakened kingdom was finally conquered by the Portuguese and was eventually taken over by rival Shona states.

The Portuguese also had vast estates, known as Prazos, and they used slaves and ex-slaves as security guards and hunters. They trained the men in military tactics and gave them guns. These men became expert elephant hunters and were known as the Chikunda. After the decline of the Portuguese the Chikunda made their way to Zambia.

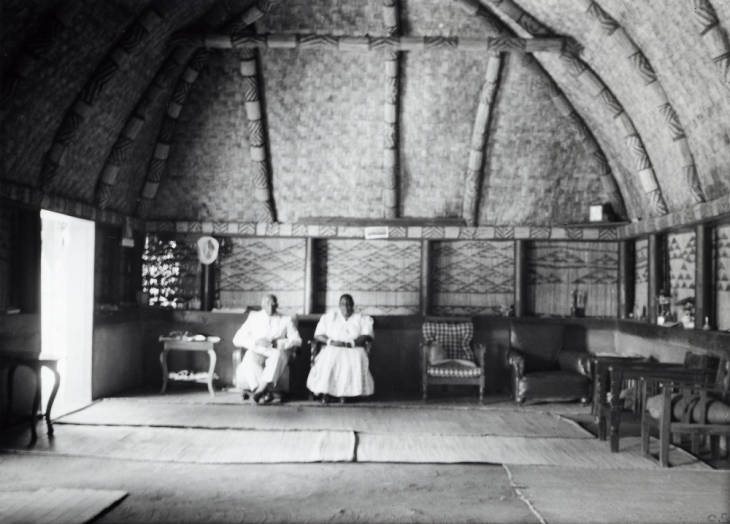
Inside the palace of the Litunga, ruler of the Lozi. Due to the flooding on the Zambezi, the Litunga has two palaces, one of which is on higher ground. The movement of Litunga to higher land is celebrated at the Kuomboka Ceremony.

The Portuguese presence in the region was a reason for the founding of the Rozvi Empire, a breakaway state of Mutapa. The ruler of the Rozvi, Changamire Dombo, became one of the most powerful leaders in South-Central Africa's history. Under his leadership, the Rozvi defeated the Portuguese and expelled them from their trading posts along the Zambezi river.

But perhaps the most notable instance of this increased militarisation was the rise of the Zulu under the leadership of Shaka. Pressures from the English colonialists in the Cape and increased militarisation of the Zulu resulted in the Mfecane (the crushing). The Zulu expanded by assimilating the women and children of tribes they defeated, if the men of these Nguni tribes escaped slaughter, they used the military tactics of the Zulu to attack other groups.

This caused mass displacements, wars and raids throughout Southern, Central and Eastern Africa as Nguni or Ngoni tribes made their way throughout the region and is referred to as the Mfecane. The arriving Nguni under the leadership of Zwagendaba crossed the Zambezi river moving northwards. The Ngoni were the final blow to the already weakened Maravi Empire. Many Nguni eventually settled around what is today Zambia, Malawi, Mozambique and Tanzania and assimilated into neighbouring tribes.

In the western part of Zambia, another Southern African group of Sotho-Tswana heritage called the Kololo manage to conquer the local inhabitants who were migrants from the fallen Luba and Lunda states called the Luyana or Aluyi. The Luyana established the Barotse Kingdom on the floodplains of the Zambezi upon their arrival from Katanga. Under the Kololo, the Kololo language was imposed upon the Luyana until the Luyana revolted and overthrew the Kololo by this time the Luyana language was largely forgotten and a new hybrid language emerged, SiLozi and the Luyana began to refer to themselves as Lozi.

At the end of the 18th century, some of the Mbunda migrated to Barotseland, Mongu upon the migration of among others, the Ciyengele.

=== Colonial period ===
==== Europeans ====
An 1864 photograph of the Scottish explorer and missionary David Livingstone

One of the earliest recorded Europeans to visit the area was the Portuguese explorer Francisco de Lacerda in the late 18th century. Lacerda led an expedition from Mozambique to the Kazembe region in Zambia (with the goal of exploring and to crossing Southern Africa from coast to coast for the first time), and died during the expedition in 1798. The expedition was from then on led by his friend Francisco Pinto. This territory, located between Portuguese Mozambique and Portuguese Angola, was claimed and explored by Portugal in that period.

Other European visitors followed in the 19th century. The most prominent of these was David Livingstone, who had a vision of ending the slave trade through the "3 Cs": Christianity, Commerce, and Civilisation. He was the first European to see the magnificent waterfalls on the Zambezi River in 1855, naming them the Victoria Falls after Queen Victoria of the United Kingdom. He described them thus: "Scenes so lovely must have been gazed upon by angels in their flight".

Locally the falls are known as "Mosi-o-Tunya" or "thundering smoke" in the Lozi or Kololo dialect. The town of Livingstone, near the Falls, is named after him. Highly publicised accounts of his journeys motivated a wave of European visitors, missionaries and traders after his death in 1873.

British South Africa Company

In 1888, the British South Africa Company (BSA Company), led by Cecil Rhodes, obtained mineral rights from the Litunga of the Lozi people, the Paramount Chief of the Lozi (Ba-rotse) for the area which later became Barotziland-North-Western Rhodesia.

To the east, in December 1897 a group of the Angoni or Ngoni (originally from Zululand) rebelled under Tsinco, son of King Mpezeni, but the rebellion was put down, and Mpezeni accepted the Pax Britannica. That part of the country then came to be known as North-Eastern Rhodesia. In 1895, Rhodes asked his American scout Frederick Russell Burnham to look for minerals and ways to improve river navigation in the region, and it was during this trek that Burnham discovered major copper deposits along the Kafue River.

==== British colonisation ====
In 1953, the creation of the Federation of Rhodesia and Nyasaland grouped together Northern Rhodesia, Southern Rhodesia, and Nyasaland (now Malawi) as a single semi-autonomous region. This was undertaken despite opposition from a sizeable minority of the population, who demonstrated against it in 1960–61.

=== Independent nation ===
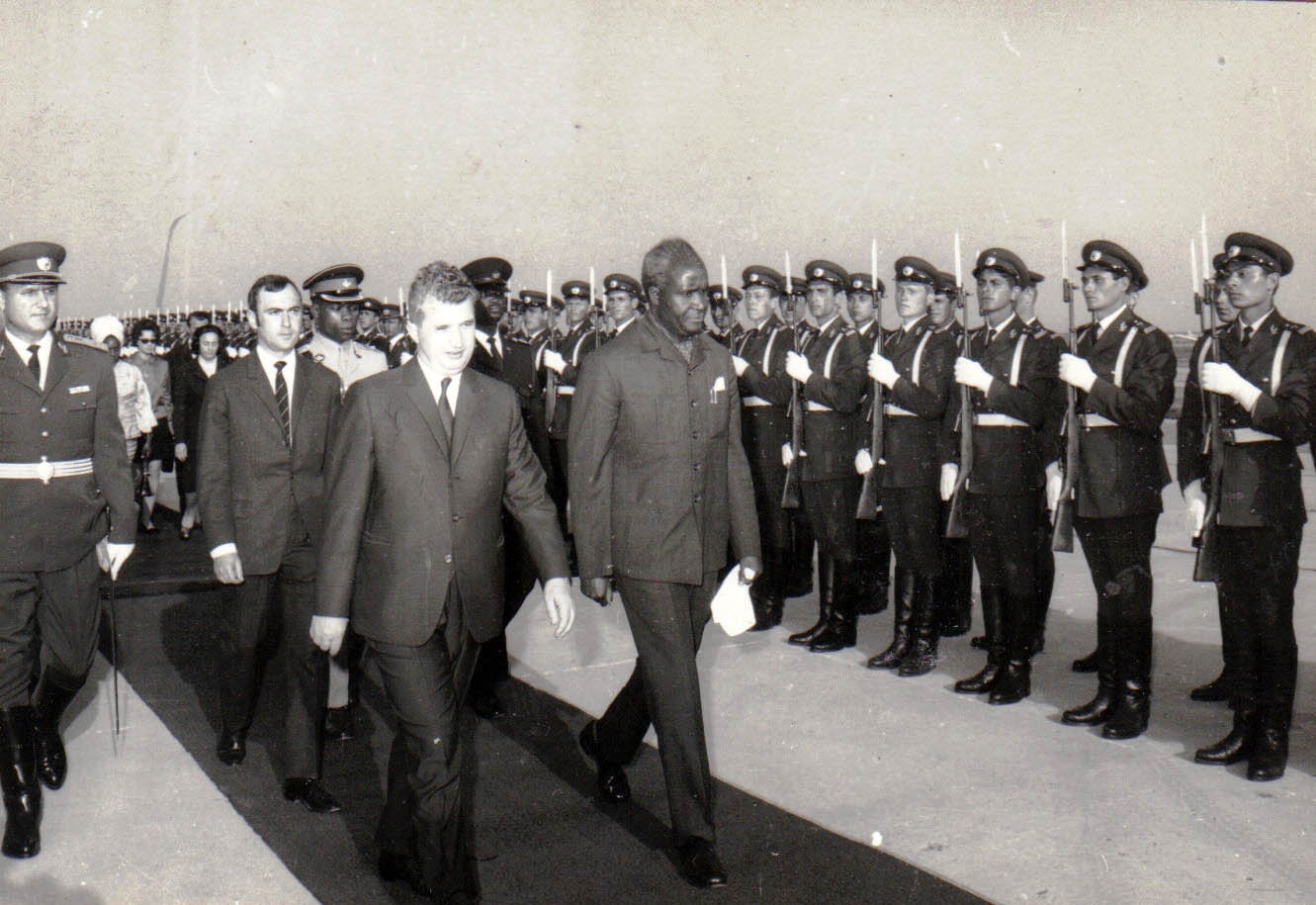
Kenneth Kaunda, first president, on a state visit to Romania in 1970

The federation was dissolved on 31 December 1963, and in January 1964, Kaunda won the only election for Prime Minister of Northern Rhodesia. The Colonial Governor, Sir Evelyn Hone, was very close to Kaunda and urged him to stand for the post. Soon after, there was an uprising in the north of the country known as the Lumpa Uprising led by Alice Lenshina – Kaunda's first internal conflict as leader of the nation.

Northern Rhodesia became the Republic of Zambia on 24 October 1964, with Kenneth Kaunda as the first president. At independence, despite its considerable mineral wealth, Zambia faced major challenges. Domestically, there were few trained and educated Zambians capable of running the government, and the economy was largely dependent on foreign expertise. This expertise was provided in part by British diplomat John Willson. There were over 70,000 Europeans resident in Zambia in 1964, and they remained of disproportionate economic significance.

Kaunda's endorsement of Patriotic Front guerrillas conducting raids into neighbouring (Southern) Rhodesia led to political tension and the militarisation of the border, culminating in its closure in 1973. The Kariba hydroelectric station on the Zambezi River provided sufficient capacity to satisfy the country's requirements for electricity, despite Rhodesian management.

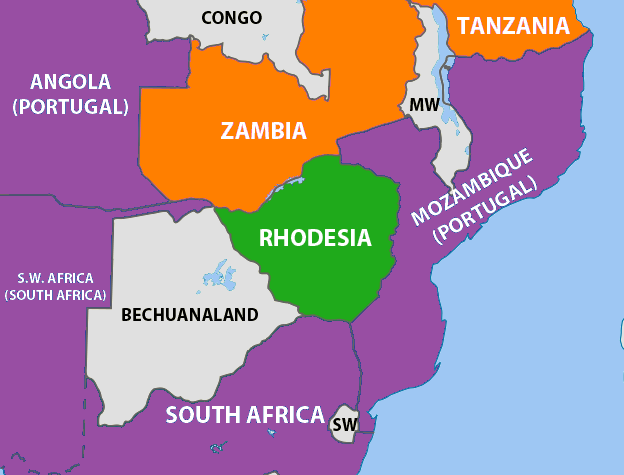
The geopolitical situation during the Rhodesian Bush War in 1965 – countries friendly to the nationalists are coloured orange

On 3 September 1978, a civilian airliner, Air Rhodesia Flight 825, was shot down near Kariba by the Zimbabwe People's Revolutionary Army (ZIPRA). 18 people, including children, survived the crash, only for most of them to be shot by militants of the Zimbabwe African People's Union (ZAPU) led by Joshua Nkomo. Rhodesia responded with Operation Gatling, an attack on Nkomo's guerrilla bases in Zambia, in particular, his military headquarters just outside Lusaka; this raid became known as the Green Leader Raid. On the same day, two more bases in Zambia were attacked using air power and elite paratroops and helicopter-borne troops.

By the 1970s, Mozambique and Angola had attained independence from Portugal. Rhodesia's predominantly white government, which issued a Unilateral Declaration of Independence in 1965, accepted majority rule under the Lancaster House Agreement in 1979.

Civil strife in both Portuguese colonies and a mounting Namibian War of Independence resulted in an influx of refugees and compounded transportation issues. The Benguela railway, which extended west through Angola, was essentially closed to Zambian traffic by the late 1970s. Zambia's support for anti-apartheid movements such as the African National Congress (ANC) also created security problems as the South African Defence Force struck at dissident targets during external raids.

==== Economic troubles ====
In the mid-1970s, the price of copper, Zambia's principal export, suffered a severe decline worldwide. In Zambia's situation, the cost of transporting the copper great distances to the market was an additional strain. Zambia turned to foreign and international lenders for relief, but, as copper prices remained depressed, it became increasingly difficult to service its growing debt. By the mid-1990s, despite limited debt relief, Zambia's per capita foreign debt remained among the highest in the world.

==== Democratisation ====
In June 1990, riots against Kaunda accelerated and many protesters were killed by the regime. In 1990, Kaunda survived an attempted coup, and in 1991, he agreed to reinstate multiparty democracy, having instituted one-party rule under the Choma Commission of 1972. Following multiparty elections, Kaunda was removed from office after losing multi-party elections to Frederick Chiluba.

In the 2000s, the economy stabilised, attaining single-digit inflation in 2006–2007, real GDP growth, decreasing interest rates, and increasing levels of trade. Much of its growth is due to foreign investment in mining and to higher world copper prices. All this led to Zambia being courted enthusiastically by aid donors and saw a surge in investor confidence in the country.

== Geography ==
Zambia map of Köppen climate classification

Zambia is a landlocked country in southern Africa, with a tropical climate, and consists mostly of high plateaus with some hills and mountains, dissected by river valleys. At 752,614 square kilometres (290,586 sq mi), it is the 39th-largest country in the world. The country lies mostly between latitudes 8° and 18°S, and longitudes 22° and 34°E.

Zambia is drained by two major river basins: the Zambezi/Kafue basin in the centre, west, and south covering about three-quarters of the country; and the Congo basin in the north covering about one-quarter of the country. An area in the northeast forms part of the internal drainage basin of Lake Rukwa in Tanzania.

In the Zambezi basin, there are rivers flowing wholly or partially through Zambia: the Kabompo, Lungwebungu, Kafue, Luangwa, and the Zambezi, which flows through the country in the west and then forms its southern border with Namibia, Botswana, and Zimbabwe. Its source is in Zambia and it diverts into Angola, and a number of its tributaries rise in Angola's central highlands. The edge of the Cuando River floodplain (not its main channel) forms Zambia's southwestern border, and via the Chobe River.

Two of the Zambezi's longest and largest tributaries, the Kafue and the Luangwa, flow mainly in Zambia. Their confluences with the Zambezi are on the border with Zimbabwe at Chirundu and Luangwa town respectively. Before its confluence, the Luangwa River forms part of Zambia's border with Mozambique. From Luangwa town, the Zambezi leaves Zambia and flows into Mozambique, and eventually into the Mozambique Channel.

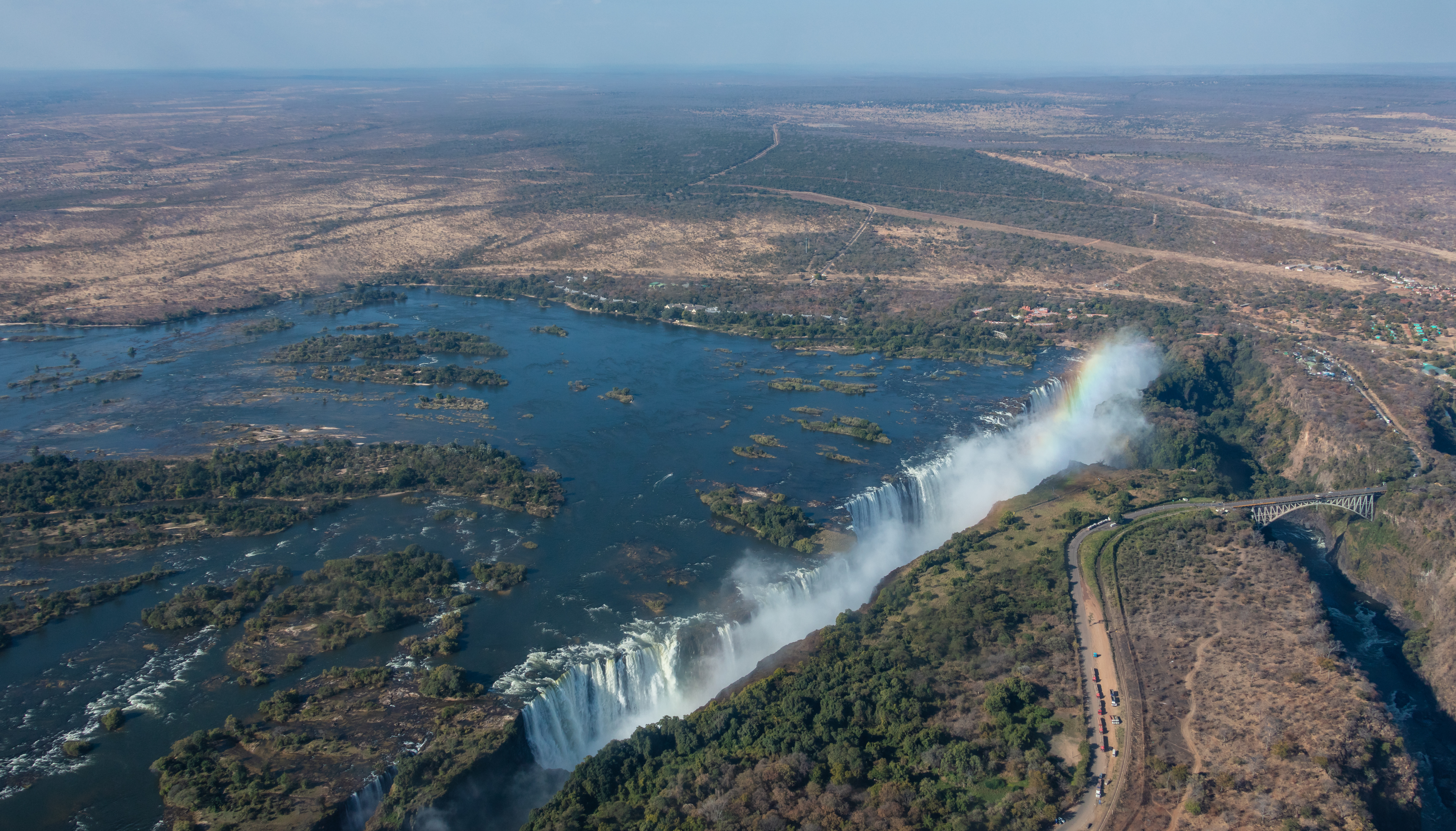
Victoria Falls

In Eastern Zambia the plateau which extends between the Zambezi and Lake Tanganyika valleys is tilted upwards to the north, and so rises imperceptibly from about 900 metres (3,000 ft) in the south to 1,200 metres (3,900 ft) in the centre, reaching 1,800 metres (5,900 ft) in the north near Mbala. These plateau areas of northern Zambia have been categorised by the World Wildlife Fund as a large section of the Central Zambezian miombo woodlands ecoregion.

The Luangwa Valley splits the plateau in a curve north-east to south-west, extended west into the heart of the plateau by the deep valley of the Lunsemfwa River. Hills and mountains are found by the side of some sections of the valley, including in its north-east the Nyika Plateau (2,200 metres or 7,200 feet) on the Malawi border, which extend into Zambia as the Mafinga Hills, containing the country's highest point, Mafinga Central (2,339 metres or 7,674 feet).

=== Climate ===
Zambia is located on the plateau of Central Africa, between 1,000 and 1,600 metres (3,300 and 5,200 ft) above sea level. The average elevation of 1,200 metres (3,900 ft) gives the land a generally moderate climate. The climate of Zambia is tropical, modified by elevation. In the Köppen climate classification, most of the country is classified as humid subtropical (Cfa) or tropical wet and dry (Aw), with stretches of semi-arid steppe climate (BSh) in the south-west and along the Zambezi valley.

The two main seasons are the rainy season (November to April) corresponding to summer, and the dry season (May/June to October/November), corresponding to winter. The dry season is subdivided into the cool dry season (May/June to August), and the hot dry season (September to October/November). The modifying influence of altitude gives the country subtropical weather rather than tropical conditions during the cool season of May to August.

=== Biodiversity ===
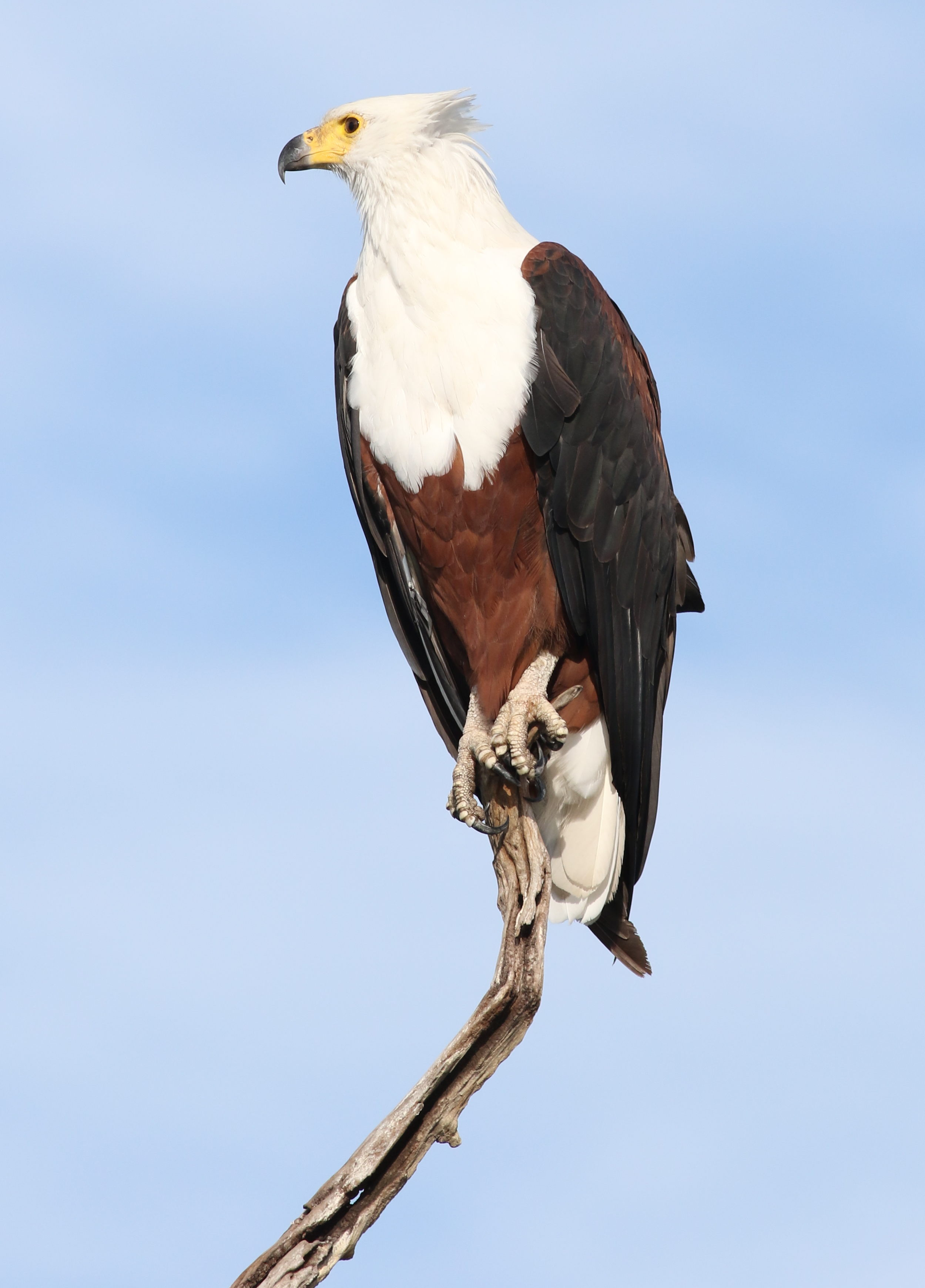
The official national animal of Zambia is the African fish eagle.

In 2015, Zambia was reported to have approximately 12,505 identified species: 63% animal species, 33% plant species and 4% bacterial species and other microorganisms.

There are an estimated 3,543 species of wild flowering plants, consisting of sedges, herbaceous plants and woody plants. The Northern and North-Western provinces of the country have the highest diversity of flowering plants. Approximately 53% of flowering plants are rare and occur throughout the country.

A total of 242 mammal species are found in the country, with most occupying the woodland and grassland ecosystems. The Rhodesian giraffe and Kafue lechwe are some subspecies that are endemic to Zambia.

Roughly 490 known fish species, belonging to 24 fish families, have been reported in Zambia, with Lake Tanganyika having the highest number of endemic species.

== Politics ==
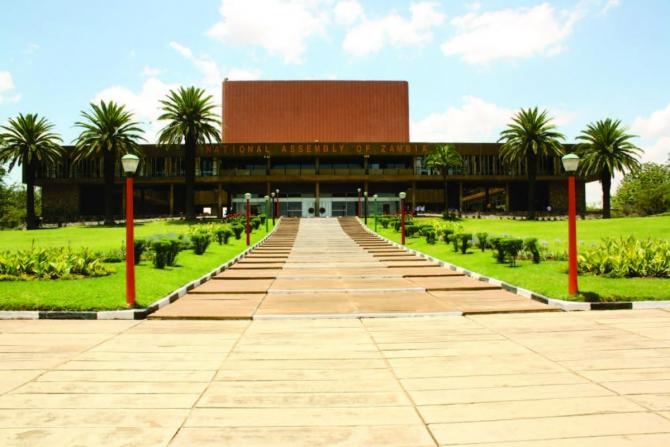
Zambia National Assembly building in Lusaka

Politics in Zambia takes place in a framework of a presidential representative democratic republic, whereby the president of Zambia is head of state and head of government in a pluriform multi-party system. The government exercises executive power, while legislative power is vested in the government and parliament.

Zambia became a republic upon attaining independence in October 1964. From 2011 to 2014, Zambia's president had been Michael Sata, until Sata died on 28 October 2014. After Sata's death, Vice President Guy Scott, a Zambian of Scottish descent, became acting president. Presidential elections were held on 22 January 2015. A total number of 11 presidential candidates contested in the election and On 24 January 2015, it was announced that Edgar Chagwa Lungu had won the election to become the 6th President. He won 48.33% of the vote, a lead of 1.66% over his closest rival, Hakainde Hichilema, with 46.67%. Nine other candidates got less than 1% each. In August 2016 Zambian general election president Edgar Lungu won re-election in the first round of the election. The opposition had allegations of fraud and the governing Patriotic Front (PF) rejected the allegations made by opposition UPND party.

In the 2021 general elections, characterised by a 70% voter turnout, Hakainde Hichilema won 59% of the vote, with his closest rival, incumbent president Edgar Chagwa Lungu, receiving 39% of the vote. On 16 August Edgar Lungu conceded in a TV statement, sending a letter and congratulating president-elect Hakainde Hichilema. On 24 August 2021, Hakainde Hichilema was sworn in as the new president of Zambia.

=== Military ===
In 2019, Zambia signed the UN treaty on the Prohibition of Nuclear Weapons.

=== Law and human rights ===
The government has prosecuted critics using the legal pretext that they had incited public disorder. Libel laws are used to suppress free speech and the press.

Same-sex sexual activity is illegal for males and females in Zambia. A 2010 survey revealed that 2% of Zambians find homosexuality to be morally acceptable. In December 2019, it was reported that United States Ambassador to Zambia Daniel Lewis Foote was "horrified" by Zambia's jailing of same-sex couple Japhet Chataba and Steven Samba. After an appeal failed and the couple was sentenced to 15 years in prison, Foote asked the Zambian government to review both the case and the country's anti-homosexuality laws. Foote faced a backlash and cancelled public appearances after he was threatened on social media, and was subsequently recalled after Lungu declared him persona non grata.

In 2026, the Zambian government was criticized for abruptly postponing a major international human rights conference, RightsCon, just seven days before it was set to be held in Lusaka. The conference was ultimately cancelled when further communication revealed the Zambian government was requiring, apparently by request of Chinese officials, the moderation and exclusion of presenters from Taiwan. Commentators raised concerns about censorship and rising threats to civil society.

== Demographics ==
As of the 2022 Zambian census, Zambia's population was 19,610,769.

Historical population

Year	Pop.	±%
1911	821,536	—
1921	983,835	+19.8%
1931	1,344,447	+36.7%
1946	1,683,828	+25.2%
1951	1,930,842	+14.7%
1956	2,172,304	+12.5%
1963	3,490,540	+60.7%

Year	Pop.	±%
1969	4,056,995	+16.2%
1980	5,661,801	+39.6%
1990	7,383,097	+30.4%
2000	9,885,591	+33.9%
2010	13,092,666	+32.4%
2022	19,610,769	+49.8%

Note: In censuses carried out during the British colonial administration prior to 1963, the black African population was estimated rather than counted.
Source: Central Statistical Office, Zambia

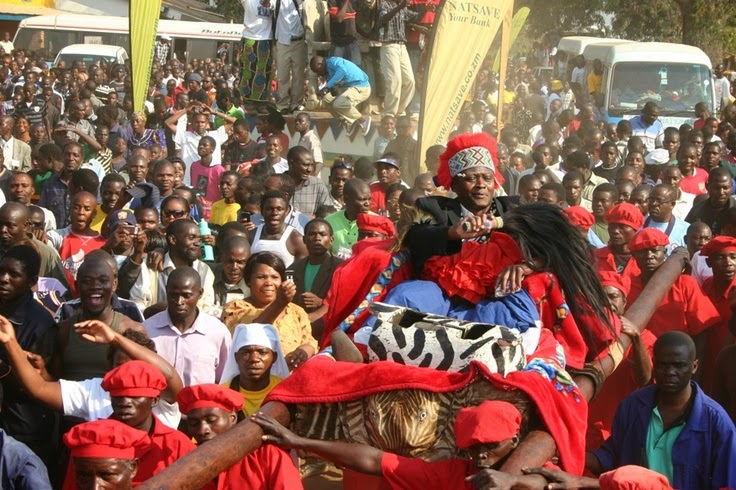
The Mwata Kazembe opens the Mutomboko ceremony.

The main ethnic groups in Zambia are Bemba 3.3 million (33.6%), Nyanja 1.8 million (18.2%), Tonga 1.7 million (16.8%), North-Western peoples 1 million (10.3%), Lozi (Barotse) 770,000 (7.8%), Mambwe 580,000 (5.9%), Tumbuka 500,000 (5.1%), Lamba 165,000 (2%), Asians 11,900 and Europeans 6,200.

Zambia is one of the most highly urbanised countries in sub-Saharan Africa, with 44% of the population concentrated along the major transport corridors, while rural areas are sparsely populated. The fertility rate was 6.2 as of 2007 (6.1 in 1996, 5.9 in 2001–02).

=== Largest towns ===
The onset of industrial copper mining on the Copperbelt in the late 1920s triggered rapid urbanisation. Although urbanisation was overestimated during the colonial period, it was substantial. Mining townships on the Copperbelt soon dwarfed existing centres of population and continued to grow rapidly following Zambian independence. Economic decline in the Copperbelt from the 1970s to the 1990s has altered patterns of urban development, but the country's population remains concentrated around the railway and roads running south from the Copperbelt through Kapiri Mposhi, Lusaka, Choma and Livingstone.

Largest cities or towns in Zambia According to the 2010 Census
Rank	Name	Province	Pop.	Rank	Name	Province	Pop.
1	Lusaka	Lusaka	1,747,152	11	Solwezi	North-Western	90,856
2	Kitwe	Copperbelt	501,360	12	Mansa	Luapula	78,153
3	Ndola	Copperbelt	451,246	13	Chililabombwe	Copperbelt	77,818
4	Kabwe	Central	202,360	14	Mazabuka	Southern	71,700
5	Chingola	Copperbelt	185,246	15	Kafue	Lusaka	71,573
6	Mufulira	Copperbelt	151,309	16	Kalulushi	Copperbelt	51,863
7	Livingstone	Southern	134,349	17	Choma	Southern	51,842
8	Luanshya	Copperbelt	130,076	18	Mongu	Western	49,818
9	Chipata	Eastern	116,627	19	Kapiri Mposhi	Central	44,783
10	Kasama	Northern	101,845	20	Nakonde	Muchinga	41,836

=== Ethnic groups ===
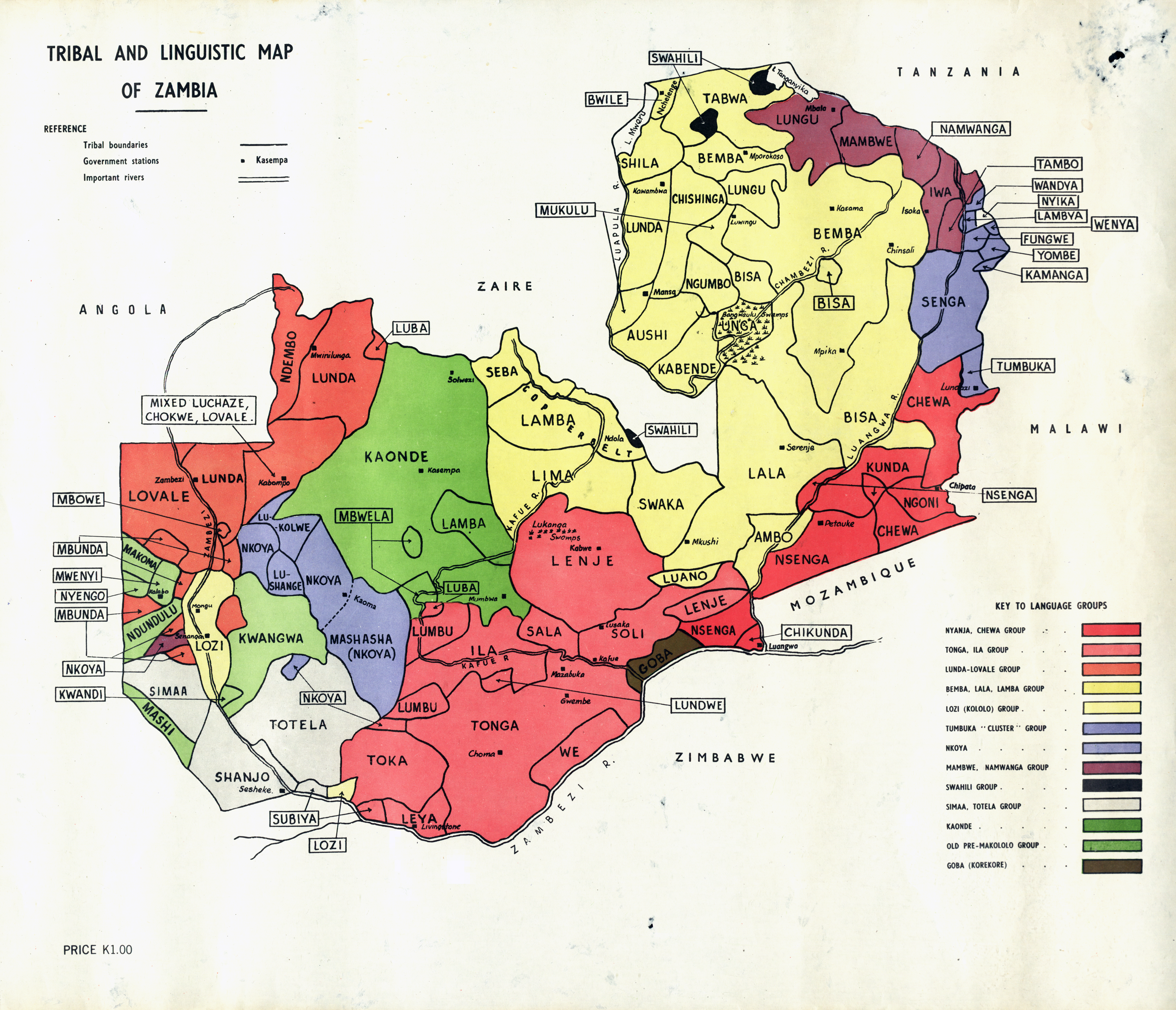
Tribal and linguistic map of Zambia

Zambia nominally includes approximately 73 ethnic groups, although in practice there are fewer distinct groups. Most Zambians are Bantu-speaking. The three largest ethnolinguistic groups are the Bemba, Nyanja (also called the Chewa), and Tonga; four smaller groups are the Kaonde, Lozi, Luanda, and Luvale. In 2010, the population was estimated to be 21% Bemba, 13.6% Tonga, 7.4% Chewa, 5.7% Lozi, 5.3% Nsenga, 4.4% Tumbuka, 4.0% Ngoni, and 38.6% other. The Bemba group is predominant in the Northern, Luapula, and Copperbelt provinces; the Nyanja in the Eastern and Central provinces; the Tonga in the Southern and Western provinces; and the Lozi in the Western Province. The Tumbuka minority lives in the Luangwa River valley in the east. No single ethnolinguistic group is predominant in the North-Western Province, which is sparsely populated.

In addition to the linguistic dimension, tribal identities are relevant in Zambia. These tribal identities are often linked to family allegiance or to traditional authorities. The tribal identities are nested within the main language groups.

Immigrants, mostly British or South African, as well as some white Zambian citizens of British descent, live mainly in Lusaka and in the Copperbelt in northern Zambia, where they are either employed in mines, financial and related activities or retired. There were 70,000 Europeans in Zambia in 1964, but many since left the country.

Zambia has a small but economically important Asian population, most of whom are Indians and Chinese. This minority group has a massive impact on the economy controlling the manufacturing sector. An estimated 80,000 Chinese were reported to reside in Zambia in 2006. In recent years, several hundred dispossessed white farmers have left Zimbabwe at the invitation of the Zambian government, to take up farming in the Southern province.

According to the World Refugee Survey 2009 published by the U.S. Committee for Refugees and Immigrants, Zambia had a population of refugees and asylum seekers numbering approximately 88,900. The majority of refugees in the country came from the Democratic Republic of the Congo (47,300 refugees from the DRC living in Zambia in 2007), Angola (27,100; see Angolans in Zambia), Zimbabwe (5,400) and Rwanda (4,900). Zambians are generally welcoming towards foreigners.

Beginning in May 2008, the number of Zimbabweans in Zambia began to increase significantly; the influx consisted largely of Zimbabweans formerly living in South Africa who were fleeing xenophobic violence there. Nearly 60,000 refugees live in camps in Zambia, while 50,000 are mixed in with the local populations. Refugees who wish to work in Zambia must apply for permits, which can cost up to $500 per year.

=== Religion ===
Zambia is officially a "Christian nation" under the 1996 constitution, but recognizes and protects freedom of religion. Zambia is the only African nation to designate Christianity as a state religion. The Zambia Statistics Agency in 2022 estimates that 98.0% of Zambians are Christian, with 74.5% Protestant, 17.9% Catholic and 5.6% Jehovah's Witnesses. The Zambia Conference of Catholic Bishops is the Catholic episcopal conference. Many Zambian Christians are syncretic, combining indigenous religious traditions with Christianity. The largest Protestant denominations are the Anglicans, evangelicals, and Pentecostals.

Christianity arrived to Zambia through European colonialism, and its wide variety of sects and movements reflect changing patterns of missionary activity; for example, Catholicism came from Portuguese Mozambique in the east, while Anglicanism reflects British influences from the south. Following its independence in 1964, Zambia saw a greater influx of other church missions from across the world, particularly North America and Germany. In subsequent decades, Western missionary roles have been assumed by native believers (except for some technical positions, such as physicians). After Frederick Chiluba, a Pentecostal Christian, became president in 1991, Pentecostal congregations expanded considerably around the country.

Religious affiliation in Zambia (2022 census)
Religion	Percent
Other Christian	74.5%
Catholic	17.9%
Jehovah's Witnesses	5.6%
No religion	1.3%
Muslim	0.5%
Other religion	0.5%

Some Christian denominations with a relatively small global presence are popular in Zambia. The country has one of the world's largest communities of Seventh-day Adventists on a per-capita basis, accounting for about 1 in 18 Zambians. The Lutheran Church of Central Africa has over 11,000 members in the country. About 12 per cent of Zambians are members of the New Apostolic Church; with more than 1.2 million believers, the country has the third-largest community in Africa, out of a total worldwide membership of over 9 million.

Approximately 2.7% of Zambians are Muslim, primarily Sunni with smaller numbers of Ismaili and Twelver Shia. The Muslim community, which numbers 100,000 according to one estimate, includes both refugees from the Congo and Somalia, as well as immigrants from South Asia and the Middle East who have become Zambian citizens. Hindus, primarily of South Asian ancestry, numbered approximately 10,000 as of 2019. At its peak in the 1960s, a small Jewish community in Zambia numbered about 1,000, mostly with origins in Lithuania, Latvia, and Germany; by 2012 there were fewer than 50 Zambian Jews, most of whom live in Lusaka and Northern Province. There are small numbers of Baháʼís, Buddhists, and Sikhs.

=== Languages ===
Density map of dominant regional languages: Bemba Chewa Lozi Lunda Nyanja Tonga

The exact number of Zambian languages is unknown, although many texts claim that Zambia has 73 languages and/or dialects; this figure is probably due to a non-distinction between language and dialect, based on the criterion of mutual intelligibility. On this basis, the number of Zambian languages would probably be only about 20 or 30.

The official language of Zambia is English, which is used for official business, education, and law. The main local language, especially in Lusaka, is Nyanja (Chewa), followed by Bemba. In the Copperbelt, Bemba is the main language and Nyanja second. Bemba and Nyanja are spoken in the urban areas, in addition to other indigenous languages that are commonly spoken in Zambia. These include Lozi, Tumbuka, Kaonde, Tonga, Lunda and Luvale, which featured on the Zambia National Broadcasting Corporation (ZNBC) local-languages section.

Most will speak Bemba and Nyanja in the Copperbelt; Nyanja is predominantly spoken in Lusaka and Eastern Zambia. English is used in official communications and is the language of choice at home among – now common – interethnic families. This evolution of languages has led to Zambian slang heard throughout Lusaka and other major cities. The majority of Zambians usually speak more than one language: the official language, English, and the most spoken language in the town or area they live in. Portuguese has been introduced as a second language into the school curriculum due to the presence of a large Portuguese-speaking Angolan community.

=== Education ===
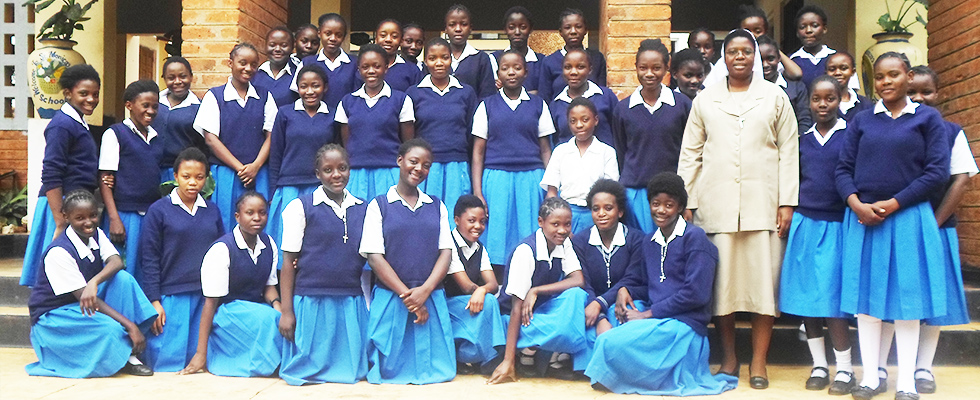
Pupils at the St Monica's Girls Secondary School in Chipata, Eastern Province

The right to equal and adequate education for all is enshrined within the Zambian constitution. The Education Act of 2011 regulates equal and quality education. The English-language literacy rate as of 2018 is 86.7%.

The government's annual expenditure on education has varied significantly. As a percentage of the government budget, it was 19.6% in 2006, 15.3% in 2011, and 20.2% in 2015. As of 2020, education expenditures constituted 3.7% of GDP.

=== Health ===
Zambia is experiencing a generalised HIV/AIDS epidemic, with a national HIV prevalence rate of 12.10 per cent among adults. However, the country has made progress over the past decade: The prevalence rate of HIV/AIDS for adults aged 15–49 decreased to 13 per cent in 2013/14, compared to 16 per cent roughly a decade earlier. Other health outcomes have also improved significantly, despite remaining poor by global standards. The maternal mortality rate in 2020 was 135 per 100,000 live births, compared to 169 in 2014 and 296 in 2007; over the same period, the mortality rate of children under five dropped to 59.3 per 1,000 live births in 2020 from 69.2 and 93.3 in 2014 and 2007 respectively.

== Economy ==
In 2022, Zambia averages between $7.5 billion and $8 billion of exports annually. It totalled $9.1 billion worth of exports in 2018. In 2015, about 54.4% of Zambians lived below the recognised national poverty line, improved from 60.5% in 2010. Rural poverty rates were about 76.6% and urban rates at about 23.4%. The national poverty line was ZMK 214 (US$12.85) per month. As of the latest estimate in 2018 by the United Nations Development Programme, 47.9 percent of the population continued to be affected by multidimensional poverty. Unemployment and underemployment in urban areas are serious problems. Most rural Zambians are subsistence farmers.

Zambia was ranked 112th in the Global Innovation Index in 2025. Social indicators continue to decline, particularly in measurements of life expectancy at birth (about 40.9 years) and maternal mortality (830 per 100,000 pregnancies) in 2007. By 2023, the life expectancy at birth had risen again to around 62 years.

Zambia fell into poverty after international copper prices declined in the 1970s. The socialist regime made up for falling revenue with several abortive attempts at International Monetary Fund structural adjustment programmes (SAPs). The policy of not trading through the main supply route and line of rail to the sea – the territory was known as Rhodesia (from 1965 to 1979), and now known as Zimbabwe – cost the economy greatly. After the Kaunda regime, (from 1991) successive governments began limited reforms. The economy stagnated until the late 1990s. In 2007 Zambia recorded its ninth consecutive year of economic growth. Inflation was 8.9%, down from 30% in 2000.

Zambia is still dealing with economic reform issues such as the size of the public sector, and improving Zambia's social sector delivery systems. Economic regulations and red tape are extensive, and corruption is widespread. The bureaucratic procedures surrounding the process of obtaining licences encourages the widespread use of facilitation payments. Zambia's total foreign debt exceeded $6 billion when the country qualified for Highly Indebted Poor Country Initiative (HIPC) debt relief in 2000, contingent upon meeting certain performance criteria. Initially, Zambia hoped to reach the HIPC completion point, and benefit from substantial debt forgiveness, in late 2003.

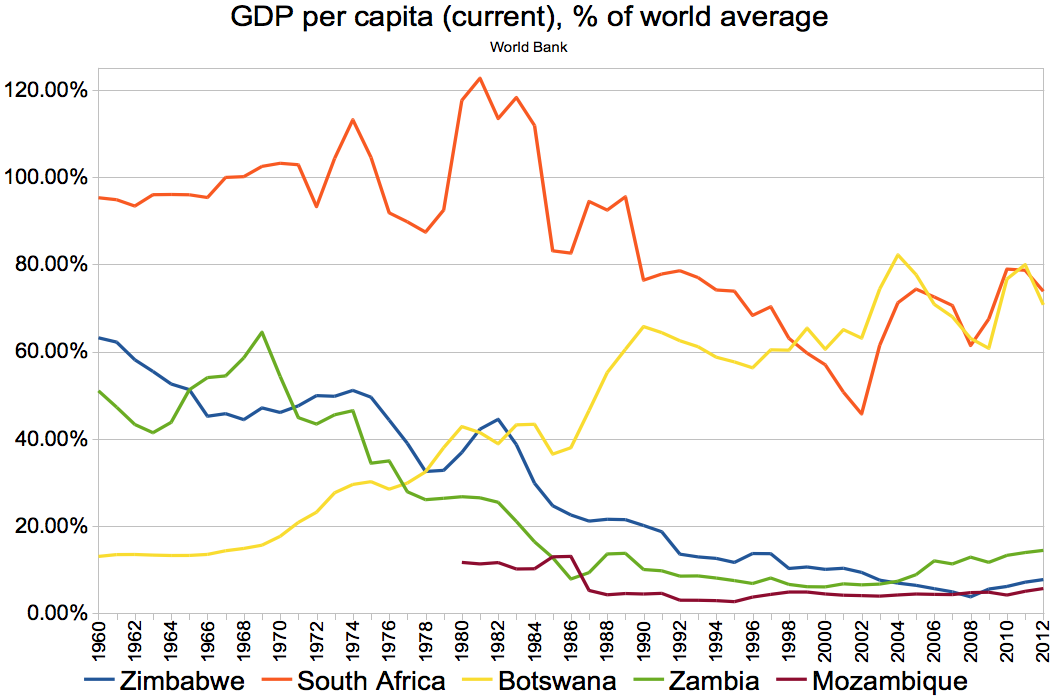
GDP per capita (current), compared to neighbouring countries (world average = 100)

In January 2003, the Zambian government informed the International Monetary Fund and World Bank that it wished to renegotiate some of the agreed performance criteria calling for privatisation of the Zambia National Commercial Bank and the national telephone and electricity utilities. Although agreements were reached on these issues, subsequent overspending on civil service wages delayed Zambia's final HIPC debt forgiveness from late 2003 to early 2005, at the earliest. In an effort to reach HIPC completion in 2004, the government drafted an austerity budget for 2004, freezing civil service salaries and increasing the number of taxes. The tax hike and public sector wage freeze prohibited salary increases and new hires. This sparked a nationwide strike in February 2004.

The Zambian government is pursuing an economic diversification programme to reduce the economy's reliance on the copper industry. This initiative seeks to exploit other components of Zambia's rich resource base by promoting agriculture, tourism, gemstone mining, and hydro-power. In July 2018, Turkish president Recep Tayyip Erdoğan and Zambia's president Edgar Lungu signed 12 agreements in capital Lusaka on areas ranging from trade and investment to tourism and diplomacy.

=== Mining ===
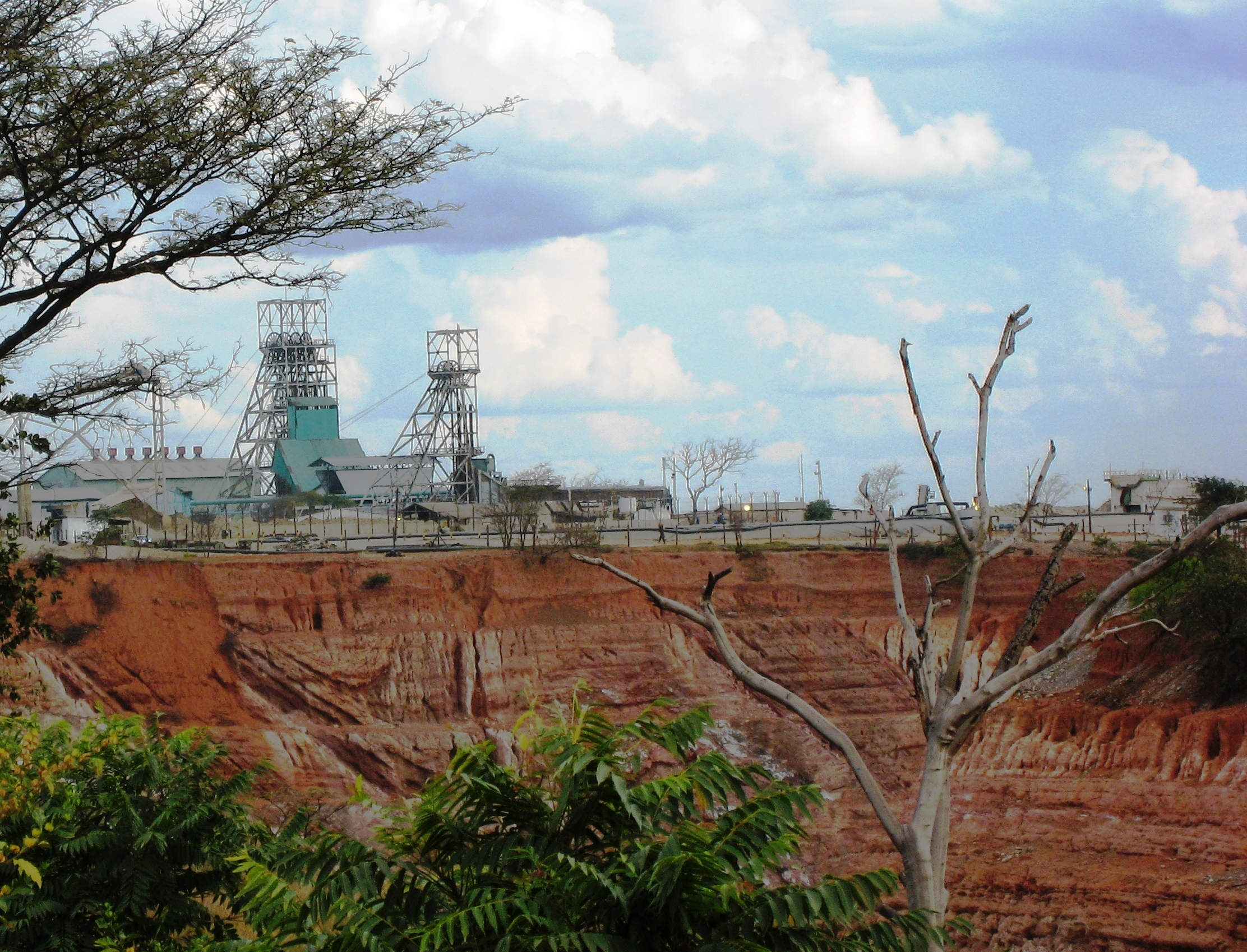
The major Nkana open copper mine, Kitwe

Mining and quarrying accounted for approximately 13.2% of the Zambian GDP in 2019. The Zambian economy has historically been based on the copper mining industry. The industry was nationalized in 1973; under government control, production declined substantially. After privatisation during the period 1996–2000, investment, production, and jobs in the copper sector increased. As of 2019, copper exports constituted about 69% of the value of all Zambian goods exported. In 2023, Zambia produced 698,000 metric tons of copper. It is the second-largest copper producer in Africa and the seventh-largest copper producer in the world, accounting for 4% of global production. The Copperbelt Province of Zambia accounts for almost one-quarter of the country's GDP and one-third of the country's copper production. The state-owned ZCCM Investments Holdings owns several mining operations; it holds a 49% stake in Mopani Copper Mines, with the remaining 51% held by the United Arab Emirates through the International Holding Company. ZCCM has interests in mining operations owned by Vedanta Resources and First Quantum Minerals. As Zambia's economy is heavily dependent on the copper industry, the national exchange rate changes in accordance with the copper price. The Chinese government, via state-owned firms and as part of its Belt and Road Initiative, has made substantial foreign direct investments in Zambian copper to secure this strategic resource for the Chinese market. The Chinese firm JCHX Mining owns 80% of Zambia's Lubambe Copper Mines, with ZCCM holding the remaining 20%. Hazardous working conditions, low wages, and labour abuses at the Chinese-operated Collum Coal Mine have been a source of political controversy in Zambia. In addition to copper, major minerals mined in Zambia include gold (Kansanshi mine), manganese (Serenje mine), and nickel (Munali mine), as well as gemstones (specifically amethyst, beryl, emerald, and tourmaline).

=== Agriculture ===
Agriculture plays a very important part in Zambia's economy providing many more jobs than the mining industry. A small number of white Zimbabwean farmers were welcomed into Zambia after their expulsion by Robert Mugabe, whose numbers had reached roughly 150 to 300 people as of 2004. They farm a variety of crops including tobacco, wheat, and chili peppers on an estimated 150 farms. The skills they brought, combined with general economic liberalisation under the late Zambian president Levy Mwanawasa, has been credited with stimulating an agricultural boom in Zambia. In 2004, for the first time in 26 years, Zambia exported more corn than it imported. In December 2019, the Zambian government unanimously decided to legalise cannabis for medicinal and export purposes only.

=== Tourism ===
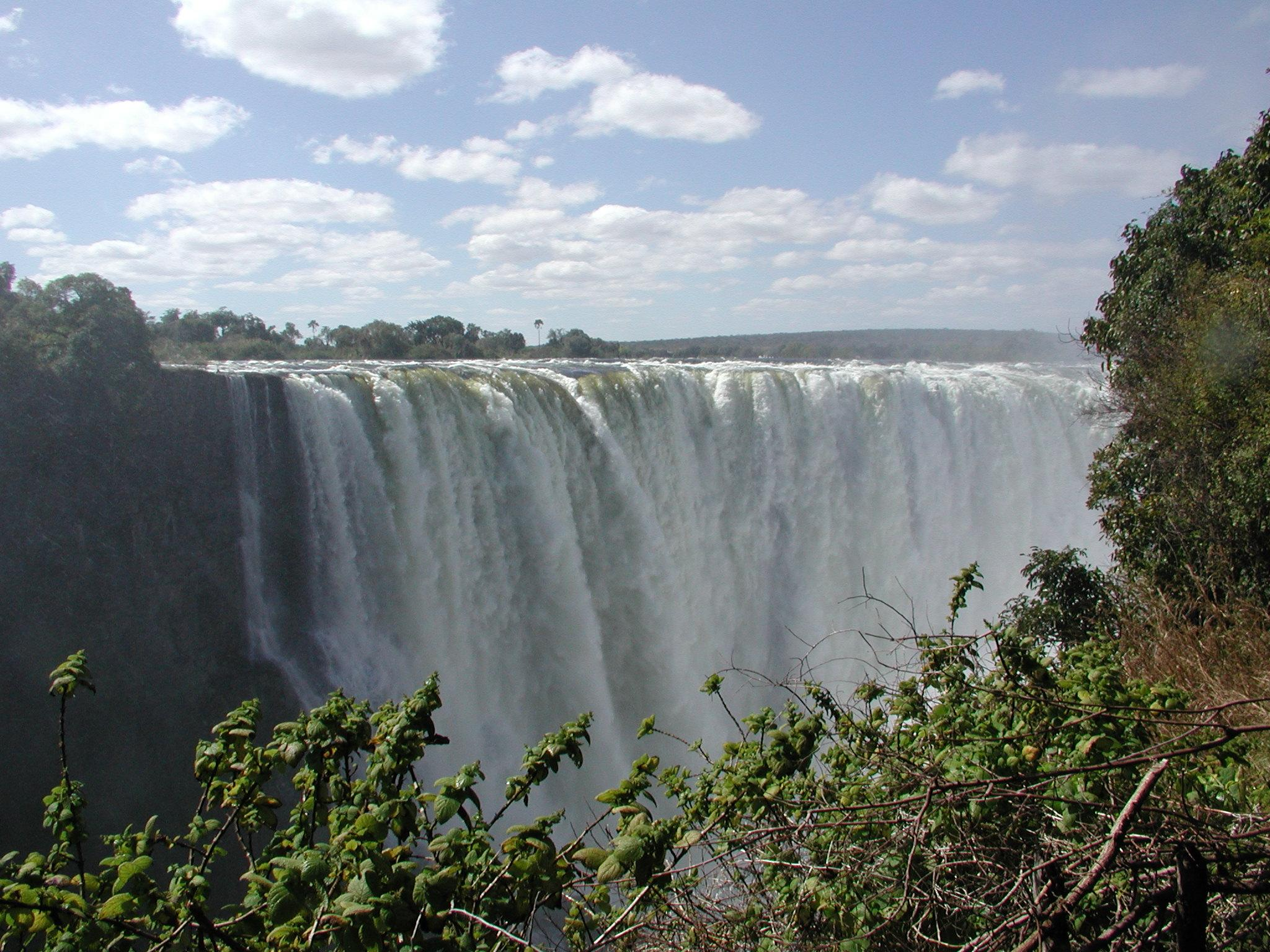
Victoria Falls (Mosi-oa-Tunya Falls), a UNESCO World Heritage Site

Tourism comprised 5.8% of the Zambian GDP in 2021; the record high, of 9.8%, occurred in 2019. Most tourism focused on wildlife protected areas, specifically Zambia's 20 national parks and 34 game management areas. The most significant tourist site, the Victoria Falls, is a UNESCO World Heritage Site. The Zambian side of the falls is within Mosi-oa-Tunya National Park; the rest of the falls are part of neighbouring Zimbabwe. Livingstone, which lies close to Victoria Falls, has become an important tourist centre. Other popular national parks include North Luangwa, South Luangwa, Kafue, and Liuwa Plain. The Zambian government has promoted tourism as a tool for economic development, particularly in rural areas, as well as for wildlife conservation.

=== Energy ===
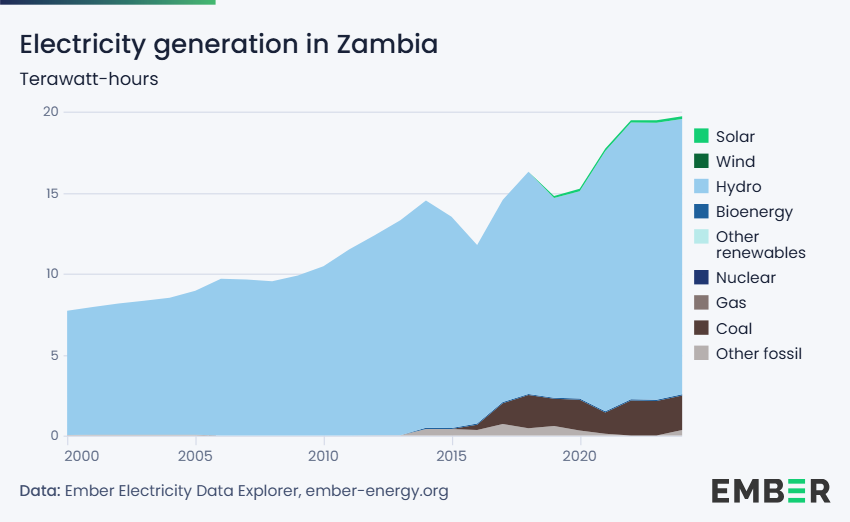
Electricity generation in Zambia in terawatt-hours

In 2009, Zambia generated 10.3 TWh of electricity and has been rated high in use of both solar power and hydroelectricity. However, early 2015, Zambia began experiencing a serious energy shortage due to the poor 2014/2015 rain season, which resulted in low water levels at the Kariba dam and other major dams. In September 2019, African Green Resources (AGR) announced that it would invest $150 million in 50 megawatt (MW) solar farm, along with irrigation dam and expanding the existing grain silo capacity by 80,000 tonnes.

== Culture ==
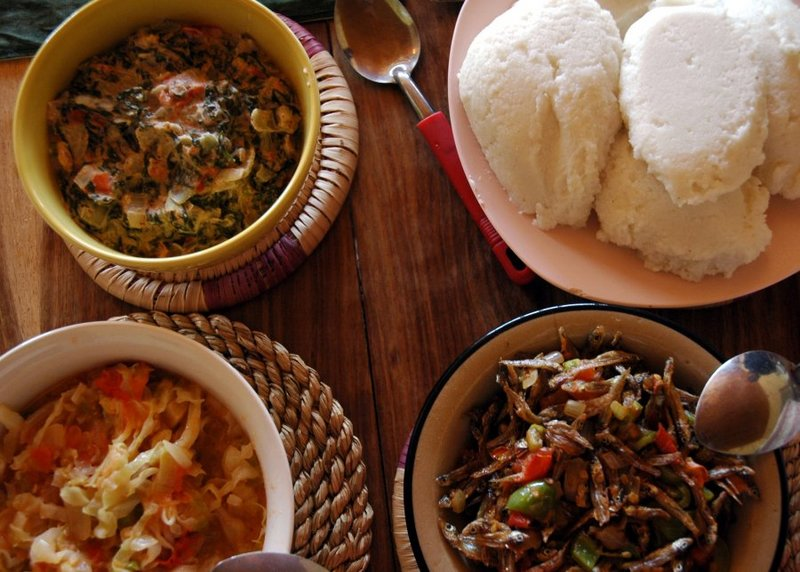
Nsima (top right corner) with three types of relish

Prior to the establishment of modern Zambia, the inhabitants lived in independent tribes, each with its own way of life. One of the results of the colonial era was the growth of urbanisation. Different ethnic groups started living together in towns and cities, influencing each other's way of life. They also started adopting aspects of global or universal culture, especially in terms of dressing and mannerisms. Much of the original cultures of Zambia have largely survived in rural areas, with some outside influences such as Christianity. Cultures that are specific to certain ethnic groups within Zambia are known as 'Zambian cultures' while those lifestyles that are common across ethnic groups are labelled "Zambian culture" because they are practiced by almost every Zambian. In the urban setting, there is a continuous integration and evolution of these cultures to produce what is called "Zambian culture".

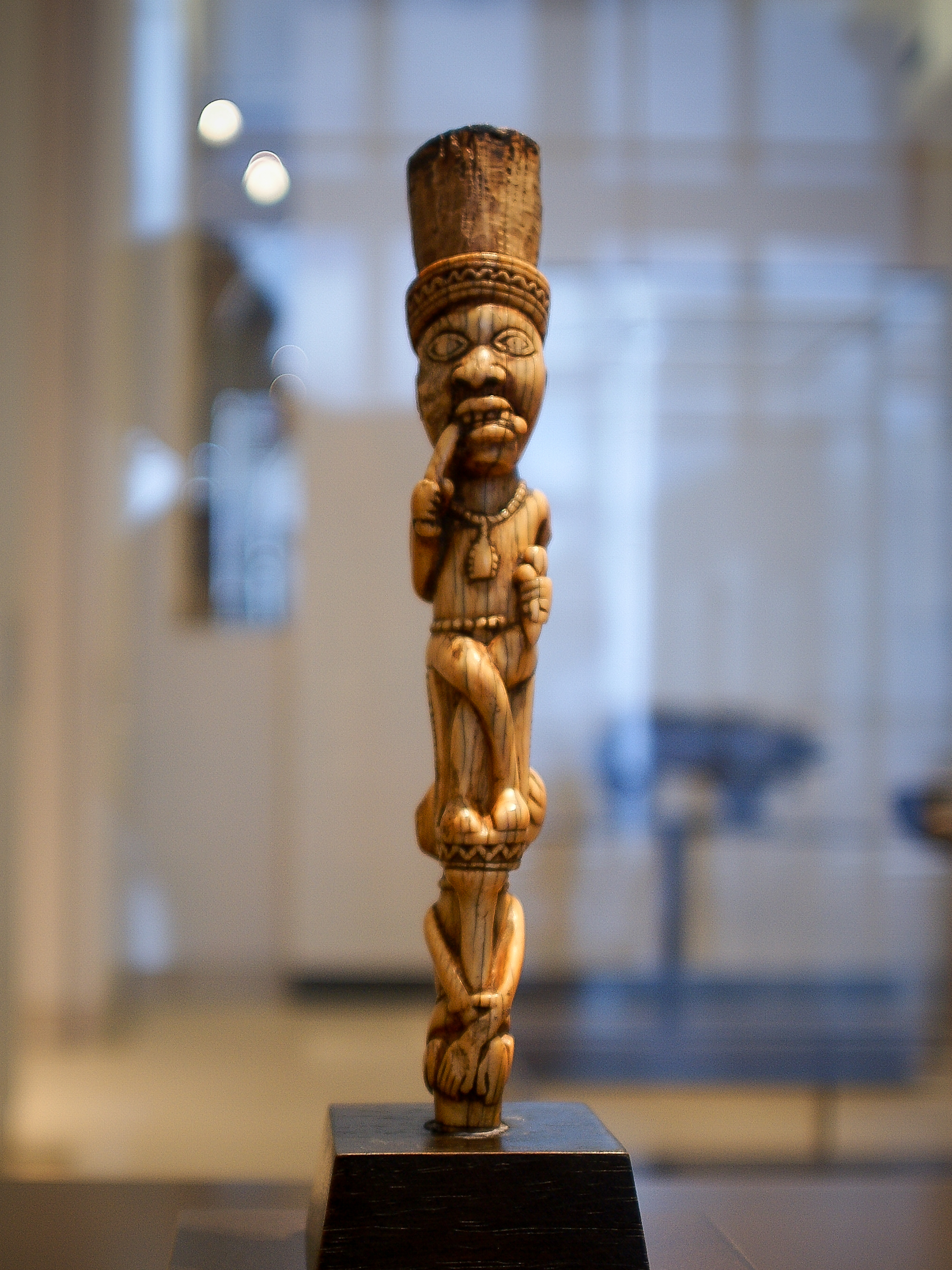
A Yombe sculpture, 19th century

Zambia practices several ceremonies and rituals ranging from nationally recognised traditional ceremonies to unrecognised yet important ceremonies. Many of the ceremonies and rituals are performed on special occasions celebrating or marking achievements, anniversaries, the passage of time, coronations and presidential occasions, atonement and purification, graduation, dedication, oaths of allegiance, initiation, marriage, funeral, birth ceremonies and others.

Like most African countries, Zambia practices both disclosed and undisclosed ceremonies and rituals. Among the disclosed ceremonies and rituals include calendrical or seasonal, contingent, affliction, divination, initiation and regular or daily ceremonies. Undisclosed ceremonies include those practiced in secret such by spiritual groups like Nyau and Nakisha dancers and traditional marriage counsellors such as alangizi women. As of December 2016, Zambia had 77 calendrical or seasonal traditional ceremonies recognized by government, and this number will increase in the near future. These are known as Zambian traditional ceremonies. Some of the more prominent are: Kuomboka and Kathanga (Western Province), Mutomboko (Luapula Province), Kulamba and Ncwala (Eastern Province), Lwiindi and Shimunenga (Southern Province), Lunda Lubanza (North Western), Likumbi Lyamize (North Western), Mbunda Lukwakwa (North Western Province), Chibwela Kumushi (Central Province), Vinkhakanimba (Muchinga Province), Ukusefya Pa Ng'wena (Northern Province).

Popular traditional arts include pottery, basketry (such as Tonga baskets), stools, fabrics, mats, wooden carvings, ivory carvings, wire craft, and copper crafts. Most Zambian traditional music is based on drums (and other percussion instruments) with a lot of singing and dancing. In urban areas, foreign genres of music are popular, particularly Congolese rumba, African-American music and Jamaican reggae.

=== Cuisine ===
Zambia's cultural diversity has an array of culinary practices. The national cuisine is unified by staple foods, with variations manifesting chiefly in cooking techniques that vary by region. A notable example is the common snack tute ne mbalala, made from cassava and groundnuts, which is roasted in some locales while fried in others. Zambia's staple food is maize. Nshima makes up the main component of Zambian meals and is made from pounded white maize.

=== Visual arts ===
Alongside traditional arts and crafts, Zambia has a modern and contemporary visual art scene, with artists working in painting, printmaking, sculpture, photography and mixed media. The Lechwe Trust, founded in 1986, has played an important role in supporting visual arts in Zambia through grants, scholarships, exhibitions and the collecting of contemporary Zambian art.

Important figures in modern Zambian art include Henry Tayali, Flinto Chandia and Lutanda Mwamba. Chandia, who worked in wood, stone and metal, was a founder member of the Zambia National Visual Arts Council and was associated with artists' workshops including Mbile and Kabasa. Mwamba was known particularly for printmaking and painting. In 2019 the Lechwe Trust held Art Lives On – ii, a retrospective exhibition of work by Chandia and Mwamba, presenting sculptures, paintings and prints produced across several decades.

=== Media ===
While freedom of expression and of the press are constitutionally guaranteed in Zambia, the government frequently restricts these rights in practice. Although the ruling Patriotic Front has pledged to free state-owned media—consisting of the Zambia National Broadcasting Corporation (ZNBC) and the widely circulated Zambia Daily Mail and Times of Zambia—from government editorial control, these outlets have generally continued to report along pro-government lines. Many journalists reportedly practice self-censorship since most government newspapers do have prepublication review. The ZNBC dominates the broadcast media, though several private stations have the capacity to reach large portions of the population.

=== Sports and games ===
Sports and games are common social aspects of Zambian culture(s) that bring people together for learning, development of skills, fun and joyous moments. Sports and games in Zambia include but are not limited to football, athletics, netball, volleyball and indigenous games such as nsolo, chiyenga, waida, hide and seek, walyako, and sojo. These are some of the indigenous games that support socialisation. All these sports and games are part of the Zambian culture(s). The fact that the games are played by more than one person makes them social and edutainment events. The history of some of these games is as old as Zambians themselves. However, Zambia started taking part in popular global sports and games mainly in 1964 Summer olympics.

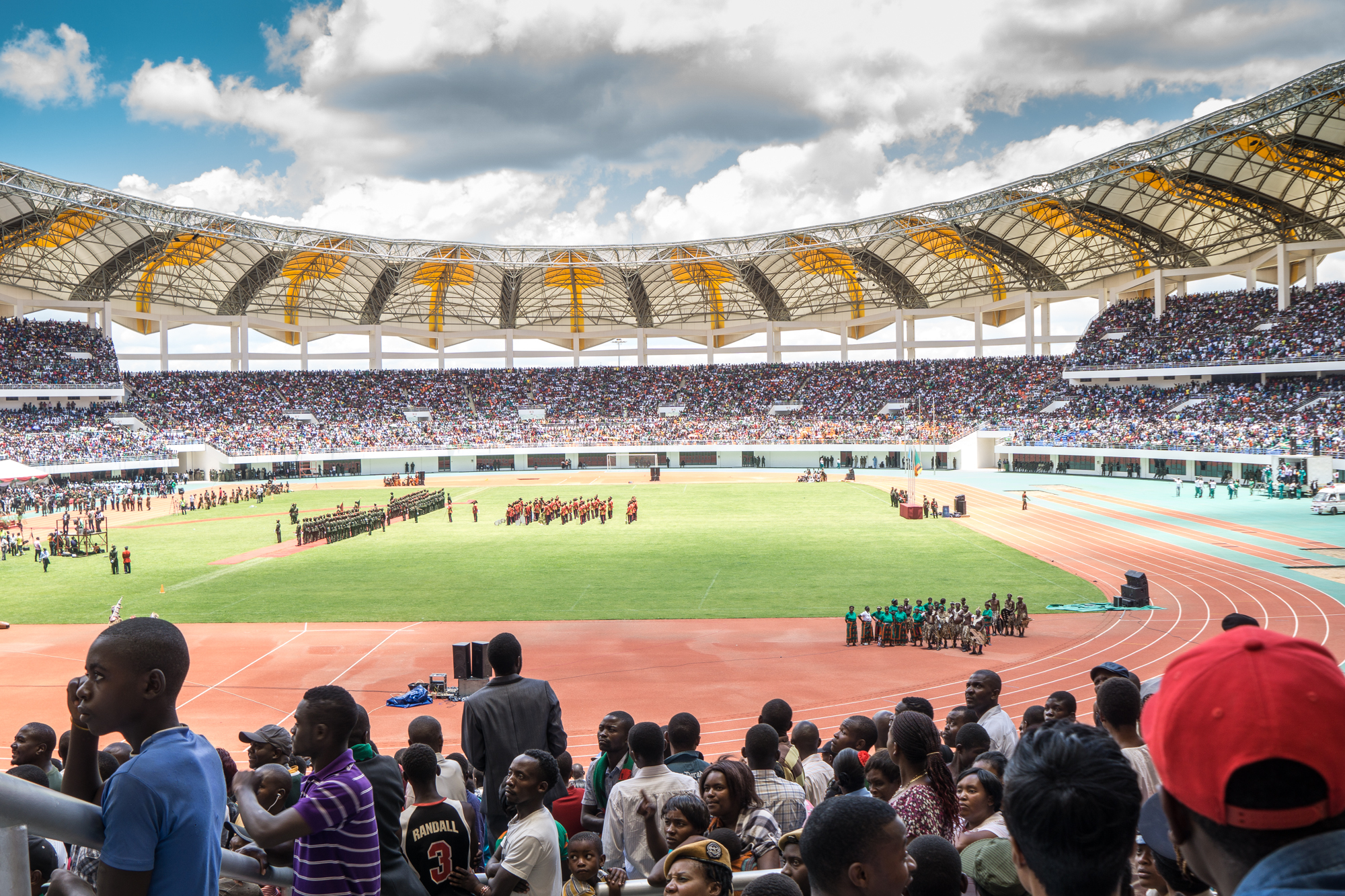
National Heroes Stadium in Lusaka

Zambia declared its independence on the day of the closing ceremony of the 1964 Summer Olympics, thereby becoming the first country ever to have entered an Olympic Games as one country and left it as another. In 2016, Zambia participated for the thirteenth time in the Olympic games. Two medals were won. The medals were won successively in boxing and on the track. In 1984 Keith Mwila won a bronze medal in the light flyweight. In 1996 Samuel Matete won a silver medal in the 400-metre hurdles. Zambia has never participated in the Winter Olympics.

Football is the most popular sport in Zambia, and the Zambia national football team has had its triumphant moments in football history. At the 1988 Summer Olympics in Seoul, the national team defeated the Italian national team by a score of 4–0. Kalusha Bwalya, Zambia's most celebrated football player, scored a hat trick in that match. However, to this day, many pundits say the greatest team Zambia has ever assembled was the one that perished on 28 April 1993 in a plane crash at Libreville, Gabon. Despite this, in 1996, Zambia was ranked 15th on the official FIFA World Football Team rankings, the highest attained by any southern African team. In 2012, Zambia won the African Cup of Nations for the first time after losing in the final twice. They beat Côte d'Ivoire 8–7 in a penalty shoot-out in the final, which was played in Libreville, just a few kilometres away from the plane crash 19 years previously. The Zambia women's national football team made its FIFA Women's World Cup debut at the 2023 tournament in Australia and New Zealand, the Zambia team being one of four representing the Confederation of African Football (CAF). They won their first Women's World Cup game in their first year, with Lushomo Mweemba scoring the fastest goal at the tournament, and Barbara Banda adding the 1,000th goal in WWC tournament history.

Rugby Union, boxing and cricket are also popular sports in Zambia. Recently, Zambia's membership has been formally restored by ICC ( International Cricket Council) on 2025. Notably, at one point in the early 2000s, the Australia and South Africa national rugby teams were captained by players born in the same Lusaka hospital, George Gregan and Corné Krige. Until 2014, the Roan Antelope Rugby Club in Luanshya held the Guinness World Record for the tallest rugby union goal posts in the world at 110 ft, 6 inches high. This world record is now held by the Wednesbury Rugby Club.

Rugby union in Zambia is a minor but growing sport. They are currently ranked 73rd by the IRB and have 3,650 registered players and three formally organised clubs. Zambia used to play cricket as part of Rhodesia. Zambia has also provided a shinty international, Zambian-born Eddie Tembo representing Scotland in the compromise rules Shinty/Hurling game against Ireland in 2008.

In 2011, Zambia was due to host the tenth All-Africa Games, for which three stadiums were to be built in Lusaka, Ndola, and Livingstone. The Lusaka stadium would have a capacity of 70,000 spectators while the other two stadiums would hold 50,000 people each. The government was encouraging the private sector to get involved in the construction of the sports facilities because of a shortage of public funds for the project. Zambia later withdrew its bid to host the 2011 All-Africa Games, citing a lack of funds. Hence, Mozambique took Zambia's place as host.

Zambia also produced the first black African (Madalitso Muthiya) to play in the United States Golf Open, one of the four major golf tournaments.

In 1989, the country's basketball team had its best performance when it qualified for the FIBA Africa Championship and thus finished as one of Africa's top ten teams. In 2017, Zambia hosted and won the Pan-African football tournament U-20 African Cup of Nation for players age 20 and under.

=== Music and dance ===
Zambia's culture has been an integral part of their development post-independence such as the uprising of cultural villages and private museums. The music which introduced dance is part of their cultural expression and it embodies the beauty and spectacle of life in Zambia, from the intricacies of the talking drums to the Kamangu drum used to announce the beginning of Malaila traditional ceremony. Dance as a practice serves as a unifying factor bringing the people together as one.

==== Zamrock ====
Zamrock is a musical genre that emerged in the 1970s, and has developed a cult following in the West. Zamrock has been described as mixing traditional Zambian music with heavy repetitive riffs similar to groups such as Jimi Hendrix, James Brown, Black Sabbath, Rolling Stones, Deep Purple, and Cream. Notable groups in the genre include Rikki Ililonga and his band Musi-O-Tunya, WITCH, Chrissy "Zebby" Tembo, and Paul Ngozi and his Ngozi Family.

== See also ==
- Outline of Zambia
- Bibliography of the history of Zambia
- A history of Zambia
