= List of airports in Malawi =

This is a list of airports in Malawi, sorted by location.

== Airports ==
Airport names shown in bold indicate the airport has scheduled service on commercial airlines.

City served	ICAO	IATA	Airport name
Blantyre	FWCL	BLZ	**Chileka International Airport**
Chelinda	FWCD	CEH	Chelinda Airport
Chitipa	FWCT		Chitipa Airport
Club Makokola	FWCM	CMK	Club Makokola Airport
Dwanga	FWDW	DWA	Dwanga Airport
Karonga	FWKA	KGJ	Karonga Airport
Kasungu	FWKG	KBQ	Kasungu Airport
Kasungu	FWLP		Lifupa Airport
Katumbi	FWKB		Katumbi Airport (Closed)
Likoma	FWLK	LIX	Likoma Airport
Lilongwe	FWKI	LLW	**Kamuzu International Airport**
Lilongwe	FWLE		Old Lilongwe Airport (Air Wing)
Liwonde	FWMK	VUU	Liwonde Makanga Aerodrome
Mangochi	FWMG	MAI	Mangochi Airport
Mchinji	FWMC		Mchinji Airport
Monkey Bay	FWMY	MYZ	Monkey Bay Airport
Mzuzu	FWUU	ZZU	Mzuzu Airport
Nchalo	FWSU		Sucoma Airport
Nsanje	FWSJ		Nsanje Airport
Ntchisi	FWCS		Ntchisi Airport
Salima	FWSM	LMB	Salima Airport
Zomba	FWZA		Zomba Airport

== See also ==
- Transport in Malawi
- List of airports by ICAO code: F#FW – Malawi
- Wikipedia: WikiProject Aviation/Airline destination lists: Africa#Malawi
