= Air Malawi =

National airline of Malawi (1964–2013)

IATA	ICAO	Call sign
QM	AIM	MALAWI
- Founded: March 1964; 62 years ago
- Ceased operations: February 2013; 13 years ago
- Parent company: Government of Malawi
- Headquarters: Blantyre, Malawi

Air Malawi Limited was the state-owned national airline of Malawi, based in Blantyre, which operated regional passenger services. Because of its financial situation, the airline was placed in voluntary liquidation, the Malawi Government announced in November 2012, and flights have been suspended since February 2013.

The airline began operations in 1964 as a subsidiary of Central African Airways, and later became independent and the national airline of Malawi. With the exception of short-lived long-haul flights to London in the 1970s, the airline has always concentrated on domestic and regional flights, from its main base at Chileka International Airport, Blantyre.

Air Malawi frequently had financial difficulties, and the Malawian government attempted to privatise the airline on two occasions without success. The first attempt in 2003 failed because the successful bidder, in partnership with South African Airways, was unable to post a security bond. The second attempt in 2007 failed after disagreements over the terms with the bidder, Comair of South Africa. The government, through its agent the Privatisation Commission, announced in September 2012 that it had embarked on another search to identify a strategic equity partner for Air Malawi, and in July 2013 Ethiopian Airlines was confirmed as the partner in a new airline to be called Malawi Airlines.

== History ==
=== Formative years (1964–1967) ===
Air Malawi began operations in 1964 as a wholly owned subsidiary of Central African Airways (CAA), which had also set up Air Rhodesia and Zambia Airways. CAA supplied Air Malawi with two Douglas DC-3s and three de Havilland Canada DHC-2 Beavers to begin services, and also provided technical assistant, equipment and personnel. On 1 August 1964, the airline began flights between Blantyre-Salima-Ndola, and to Beira in Mozambique. The Beira service was operated in conjunction with DETA. The airline began services to Mzuzu with the DC-3s, and on 18 February 1965 a Salisbury-Mauritius service was inaugurated and operated via Blantyre, Nampula and Antananarivo.

1967 saw CAA being wound down, and Air Malawi became independent, giving Malawi a national airline. The airline introduced two ex-CAA Vickers Viscounts, and a Beech C55 Baron joined the fleet. By the end of 1967, the DC-3 was operating on all Air Malawi domestic services. Central African Airways was officially dissolved on 31 December 1967, and responsibility for all flights passed onto the three now independent airlines (Zambia Airways, Air Malawi and Air Rhodesia), of which Air Malawi was officially established by an Act of Parliament in 1967. Membership in the International Air Transport Association was attained on 1 January 1968.

=== Independent operations (1968–1999) ===
The Viscount entered revenue service on 2 April 1968 on the Blantyre to Johannesburg route, and later routes included Blantyre-Salisbury, and Salisbury-Mauritius via Blantyre and Nampula. The late 1960s and early 1970s saw the fleet being modernised and standardised. Two HS-748s were ordered in May 1969, and the airline ordered two Britten-Norman BN-2A Islanders in July 1969. The HS-748s were delivered in December 1969 and January 1970, and the Islanders were delivered in November 1969 and September 1970, allowing for the sale of the Beech Barons. The airline disposed of the last of the DC-3s in March 1970, and in November 1970 it leased a BAC One-Eleven from Zambia Airways on a two-year term. With the addition of the BAC One-Eleven, Nairobi and Johannesburg were added to the fleet network.

In February 1972, the airline leased a Vickers VC-10 from British Caledonian, and it entered service on a route from Blantyre to London. British Caledonian sold the aircraft to Air Malawi in November 1974, and the service to Gatwick Airport in London, via Nairobi, began on 3 December 1974. In 1974, the airline began flights from Blantyre to Manzini in Swaziland with the HS-748, and operated the route until October 1975. By the end of 1975, the airline operated one VC-10, two One-Elevens, two HS-748s and two Islanders, on a route network which included Amsterdam, Beira, Harare, Johannesburg, Lusaka, Manzini, Ndola, Nairobi, Salisbury and Seychelles.

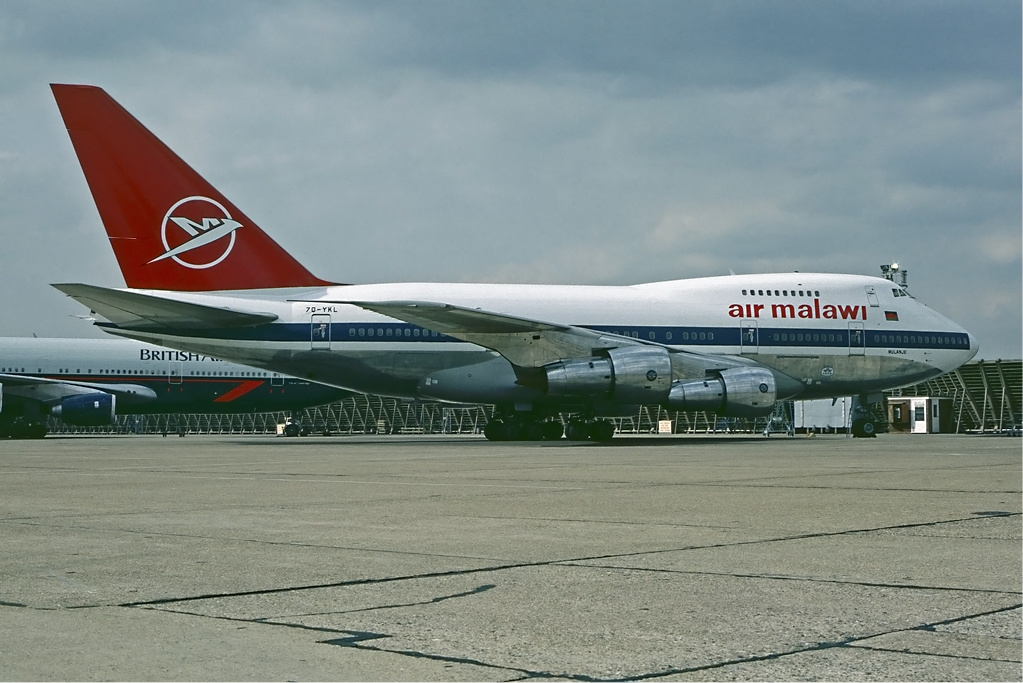
Air Malawi's leased Boeing 747SP at Heathrow Airport in 1985.

In September 1978, the VC-10 was withdrawn from service, because of increasing operational costs which were a burden on the airline's financial stability, and the two Viscounts were sold to Air Zimbabwe in 1979 and 1980. Three Shorts Skyvans and a Beechcraft King Air were purchased in 1980. The airline moved its international flights in 1983 from Blantyre to Lilongwe with the inauguration of Kamuzu International Airport, however its maintenance bases remained at Blantyre.

In April 1985, the airline wet leased a Boeing 747SP from South African Airways and painted the aircraft in Air Malawi livery. The aircraft was used only for the trip of President Hastings Banda to London, and remained on the civil aircraft register for only 40 days. On 6 November 1987, a Shorts Skyvan was shot down by Mozambican armed forces killing all 10 people (8 passengers and 2 crew) on board. The aircraft was on an internal flight, although Mozambican military claimed that the aircraft had violated Mozambique's airspace. In June 1989, the airline ordered two Boeing 737-500s, but before delivery the order was reduced to one Boeing 737-300, the first of which arrived in May 1991. In April 1991, the airline ordered two Boeing 737-300s in a deal valued at US$65 million. The HS-748 was also replaced in 1991 with an ATR 42, and a Dornier 228 was introduced into the fleet in December 1993.

=== Financial and ownership difficulties (2000–2011) ===
In April 2000, it was reported that Air Malawi was in financial difficulty, and that it may have had to sell its assets in order to stay afloat, however the airline public relations department refused to comment on the situation. The government decided to privatise Air Malawi in 2000. 110 employees were laid off in March 2002 in order to help keep costs under control, with Mathews Chikaonda, the former Malawian Finance Minister noting that the airline was overstaffed and was a drain on the coffers of the government.

After the Malawian government approved a bid by South African Airways (SAA) and Crown Aviation to take a stake in Air Malawi, in April 2003, the deal with SAA to support the airline fell through. The Malawi Privatisation Committee stated that the bidders would not pay a US$250,000 security bond, and the government wanted SAA to take an equity stake in the airline, whilst an SAA executive said that the airline had an interest in supporting Air Malawi, but it was more important for the airline to make its investment in Air Tanzania work.

In November 2007, it was announced that the Malawian government was in talks with Comair of South Africa over a partnership deal with Air Malawi. The deal would have seen Comair acquiring the air traffic rights of Air Malawi, some of the assets including a Boeing 737-300, and the launching of a new airline to be called Comair Malawi. It was alleged that Comair was only interested in acquiring the 737-300 In the 2007 financial year, Air Malawi posted a profit of K135 million, an improvement on the K854 million loss it posted in 2006. In early 2008, negotiations with Comair broke down in dispute over the terms of the arranged deal; the Malawian government preferring a strategic partnership, whilst Comair wished to take an 80% stake in the airline.

In September 2008, it was announced that the Malawian government had agreed to sell a 49% stake in Air Malawi to Comair, with Roy Commsy, Malawian Deputy Transport Minister stating that the government insisted on a 49% stake as being in the best interests of the nation. It was revealed that Comair would purchase the 49% shareholding in Air Malawi for K490,000 (approximately US$3,500), with an option to increase the stake to its desired 80%.

In August 2009, it was announced that Air Malawi was in negotiations with Zambezi Airlines for a strategic partnership.

In October 2009, Air Malawi started an e-commerce project to cut down costs and provide realtime access to reservations for online customers and travel agents.

=== Liquidation of Air Malawi and creation of Malawi Airlines (2012–2013) ===
Ethiopian Airlines was reported as moving closer to acquiring a 49pc share in Air Malawi, after the Private Public Partnership (PPP) commission of Malawi declared it the "preferred bidder" to be a strategic equity partner in the soon-to-be restructured Malawi Airlines, intending it to be part of its strategy to form a Southern African hub, according to a senior management member at Ethiopian Airlines.

In July 2013 Ethiopian Airlines was confirmed as the new partner; it would own 49% of the new airline, while the Malawian government would own 51%. The new airline would be called Malawi Airlines in order to shake-off the negative reputation of the airline, as well as prevent "predatory creditors who would seek to embarrass the airline", bringing an end to the 46-year-old airline.

== Corporate affairs ==
=== Ownership and subsidiaries ===
Air Malawi was wholly owned by the Government of Malawi.

Because the airline was in voluntary liquidation, through the Privatisation Commission (PC), the government restructured Air Malawi; it created a new company, Air Malawi (2012) Limited, as a step towards selection of a competent strategic equity partner (SEP) to acquire new shares in Air Malawi through a recapitalisation scheme, said PC chief executive officer Jimmy Lipunga. He said to sustain the country's Bilateral Air Services Agreements, the level of participation within the SEP should bring the participation of Malawian nationals, both with the SEP and government shareholding, to 51 per cent.

For this purpose, the new company would exclude its existing wholly owned subsidiaries, Air Cargo Limited and Lilongwe Handling Company Limited, which are thought to be profitable, and which will subsequently be delinked from Air Malawi Limited.

=== Business trends ===
Air Malawi was consistently loss-making. The figures that had been made available for recent years, mainly in Malawi Government Economic Reports or in statements by government officials, are shown below (for fiscal years ending 30 June):

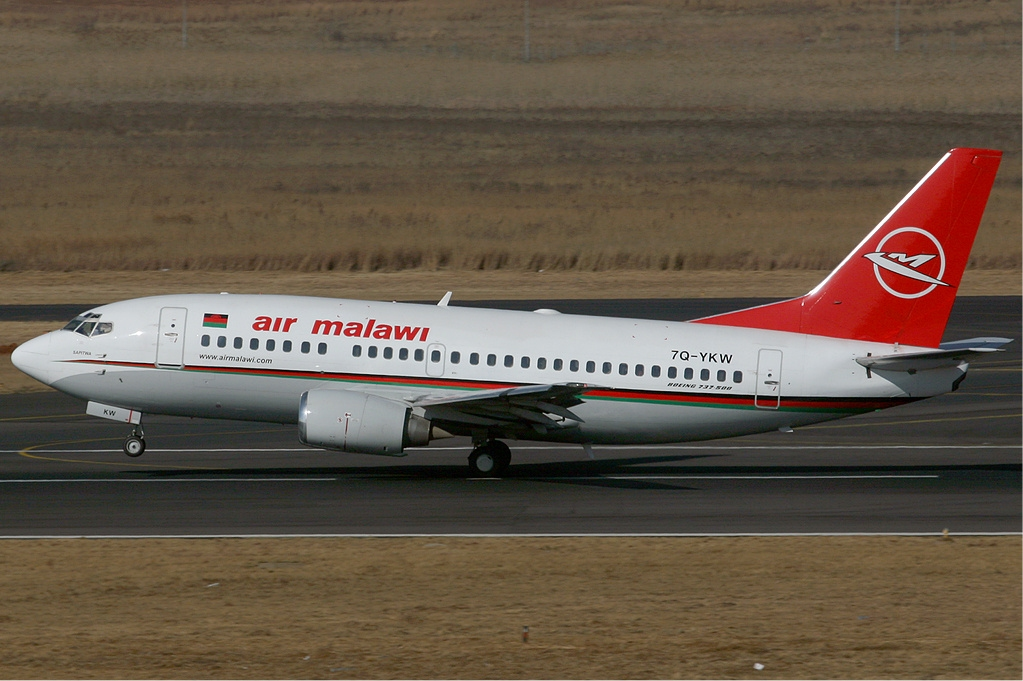
A Boeing 737-500 of Air Malawi, pictured in 2006.

	2004	2005	2006	2007	2008	2009	2010	2011	2012
Turnover (Km)	n/a	n/a	n/a	n/a	3,078	2,600	1,654	n/a	n/a
Net Profits/Losses after tax (Km)	−43	−730	−854	132	−922	−1,471	−1,169	n/a	n/a
Number of employees (at year end)	n/a	n/a	n/a	n/a	n/a	n/a	n/a	n/a	c. 270
Number of passengers (m)	n/a	n/a	n/a	n/a	n/a	n/a	n/a	n/a	n/a
Passenger load factor (%)	n/a	n/a	n/a	n/a	n/a	n/a	n/a	n/a	n/a
Number of aircraft (at year end)					3	5	3	3	2
Notes/sources									

== Destinations ==
Air Malawi operated to the following destinations, as of November 2011.

^{†}	Hub
^{¤}	Focus city

City	Country	IATA	ICAO	Airport	Refs
Blantyre	Malawi	BLZ	FWCL	Chileka International Airport	
Dar es Salaam	Tanzania	DAR	HTDA	Julius Nyerere International Airport	
Harare	Zimbabwe	HRE	FVHA	Harare Airport	
Johannesburg	South Africa	JNB	FAJS	OR Tambo International Airport	
Lilongwe	Malawi	LLW	FWKI	Kamuzu International Airport	
Lusaka	Zambia	LUN	FLLS	Lusaka International Airport	

== Fleet ==
=== Historic fleet ===
The Air Malawi fleet had previously included the following aircraft:

Air Malawi Historic Fleet
Aircraft	Total	Retired in
BAC One-Eleven	2	1991
Boeing 737-300	1	2009
Boeing 737-500	1	2007
Boeing 747SP	1	1985
Short SC.7 Skyvan	3	1988
Vickers VC-10	1	1979
