= Kunda people =

Ethnolinguistic group indigenous to the Republic of Zambia

Kunda
Total population
- c. 250,000

Regions with significant populations
- Zambia Eastern Province, Zambia Mambwe District

Languages
- Kunda dialects (Kunda-Nsenga language and Chiŵetwe)

Religion
- Christianity, Islam, African traditional religions, Bantu religion

Related ethnic groups
- Nsenga people, Bisa people, and other Bantu peoples.

- Person: Mkunda
- People: Akunda
- Language: Chikunda

== Location ==
The Kunda or Akunda people are an ethnic group that hails from Mambwe District of Eastern Province, Zambia. Most Kundas live on the eastern bank of the Luangwa River near South Luangwa National Park.

The Kunda people are not to be confused with the Chikunda of Luangwa District and those found in Zimbabwe and Mozambique and their language is totally different from the Kunda of Luangwa District.

The Kundas who number approximately 250,000 people, speak a language called Chikunda, a Bantu language closely related to Bisa and Nsenga.

== History of the Kunda people ==
Silva Porto on his 1852 expedition mentions the Kunda people, “Where the Luangwa is crossed begins the territory of the Cunda.

David Livingstone during his 1868 visit to the Awemba country makes a sketch drawing of an “Akunda” person with facial tribal markings.

The Kunda people were part of the later migrations from the Congo basin after the collapse of the Luba and Lunda kingdoms.

The majority of the languages in Zambia are Bantu languages and most of them are as a result of the slow processes of migration, language contact, and language shift which begun in present-day Nigeria and Cameroon around 300 BC going eastwards to East Africa and southwards to the Congo basin and Southern Africa by the Eighteenth Century. As they migrated south, they split even further into smaller groups.

== Kunda tales and legends ==
The Kunda people, like many other Africa tribes, have folktales that talk about their origins. There are a number of hallmarks in these tales about the origins of the Kunda people that the Kunda do not miss. Whenever Kunda people tell legends about their origins, they never miss to say three things: that they came from ‘ku Uluba’ (Luba Kingdom), ‘kwa Chaŵala Makumba’ (from Chaŵala Makumba's Kingdom) under the leadership of Mambwe, their revered great leader during the migration, who led them from the Congo basin to their present settlement in the mid Luangwa valley (which they fondly call Malambo).

One such story is narrated by Kunda elders at their annual traditional ceremony, the Malaila - Malaila Traditional Ceremony Of The Kunda People is the commemoration of the celebration for the brave achievement of the Kunda People that occurred when Mambwee sent his hunters to kill a man eating lion that had been terrorizing his people.

When Mambwee with his subjects settled in what is today known as Mambwe District in the Eastern Province of Zambia after their migration from Caŵala Makumba Leader of the Bisa People of the Luba Kingdom in Congo. The Malaila traditional ceremony is a ‘victory festival where the Kunda people celebrate the legend of the killing of a marauding lion and other beasts which wreaked havoc in Malambo (wilderness) killing men and women who dared to go and tend their gardens or do their daily chores. This brought widespread famine because people stopped cultivating their fields living in terror for fear of being mauled.

This ceremony is commemorated annually on the third Saturday of the month of August at a traditional historical site called Luŵaneni. It begins with the ceremony of Moving Mambwee Che Nsefu from his palace to his home at Luŵaneni through an exhibition exercise of going round his entire Kunda Kingdom, followed by paying homage to the departed Chiefs and is characterized by much dancing, feasting, and showcasing of Kunda culture and tradition. Lately it has presented a business opportunity for many enterprising Kundas and people from as far as Malawi and Lusaka. It is also reminiscent of the arrival of the Kunda people in Mambwe District. It brings together all six Kunda Chiefs under the leadership of HRH Senior Chief Mambwee Che Nsefu and HRH Chief Mambwee Che Jumbe, HRH Chief Mambwee Kakumbi, HRH Chief Mambwee Malama, HRH Chieftainess Mambwee Msoro and HRH Chief Mambwee Mnkhanya. It is also attended by other Chiefs from surrounding tribes of Lusangazi District, HRH Chief Sandwe whose Chieftaincy originated from the Kunda People when Kanyozo their leader was given the kingdom, and many others from across the country.

Mambwee and his people also celebrated Malaila Traditional Ceremony after defeating other tribes at wars. Although at present day the Kunda People are no longer preoccupied with fighting enemies at war nor demonstrating their bravery over wildlife which dominated the Malambo valley, the people still perform Malaila Traditional Ceremony as a symbol of preservation of the Kunda traditions, heritage and respect to "Mambwee” the Senior Chief and his Chiefs.

The ceremony had gone into oblivion with the arrival of the Missionaries who had come with the colonial masters. The Missionaries insisted that the ceremony included paganism which conflicted with the basic Christian teachings and therefore had to be abolished.

However, it was in 1977 that the Chiefs decided to revive the observance of the Malaila Traditional Ceremony and thus the first performance was held at Masumba Village in Chief Mnkhanya's area while in the following year (1978) it was shifted to Shalilenipo Village where the palace for Senior Chief Mambwee Che Nsefu is.

Since 2008 the ceremony is now being held at Luŵaneni, an appropriate historical and traditional site where most remarkable and memorable Kunda history was and is still being recorded.

According to Kunda oral history, a Luba king by the name of Chaŵala Makumba ordered that all boys were to be killed as soon as they are born. So, because of his oppressive rule, people began to flee from the Luba Kingdom heading south into what is now called Zambia

A Luba king by the name of Chaŵala Makumba ordered that all boys were to be killed as soon as they were born. Because of his oppressive rule, people began to flee from the Luba Kingdom heading south into what is now called Zambia:

"A chief named Chabala-Makumbaa Mnengulube by clan ruled the Bisa under the “Luba empire” of “Mwata Yamvo”. Being afraid of losing his throne, he ordered that all his baby boys should be killed at birth; one of his wives by the name of Chiluya Manda of the Chulu Clan defied the law by keeping her son whom she called Mambwe. She hid the boy in a tree trunk and would send her slave girl to go and feed the baby, she lied to Chabala Makumba that she lost the baby and asked to go and visit family. She took the baby to Chief Mwane who took up the responsibility of raising Mambwe, When the boy grew to manhood, Chief Mwane told Mambwe about his parentage and he became the leader of people who escaped from the harsh chief, Chawala Makumba. As they travelled, they came to the Luangwa River which they crossed easily because Mambwe took his magic tail and struck the water to make a dry path, and the name of that place was called Pakaimba. After this he committed adultery with his sister and all the other leaders told him that for that he must be called Mukunda, and the people who followed him were called Akunda. Shortly afterwards Mambwe left the main tribe and went north-eastwards to found his own small tribe of the Akunda."

The Kunda people belong to the language and dialect cluster with the Aushi, Chishinga, Kabende, Mukulu, Ngumbo, Twa, Unga, Bemba, Bwile, Luunda, Shila, Tabwa (Northern province) Bisa, Kunda (border of Northern and Eastern provinces) Lala, Ambo, Luano, Swaka (Eastern and Central provinces) Lamba, Lima (Copperbelt and Central provinces).

== Kunda Royal Establishment ==
There are seven Kunda chiefs under the Kunda Royal Establishment namely: HRH Senior Chief Mambwe Che Nsefu/ SEFU, HRH Chief Mambwe Malama, HRH Chieftainess Mambwe Msoro, HRH Chief Mambwe Mnkhanya, HRH Chief Mambwe Kakumbi, HRH Chief Mambwe Che Jumbe all in Mambwe District and HRH Chief Mambwe Sandwe who is in Lusangazi District.

== Kunda language ==
A long time ago there were fewer tribes, later these tribe begun to divide among themselves to be the Chewa, the Nsenga, the Lala, the Bisa, the Ambo and the Kunda were one tribe and shared a common ancestry, they all came from Chaŵala Makumba. She tells a folktale of how some of these tribes divided:

“All the three chiefs were on the roof top of the house. One said, 'Bring me an axe (nkwangwa).' But some people doubted, saying, 'Maybe he wants izembe (an axe), some said, 'Does he need katemo (an axe)?' Again another chief said, 'Bring me matika (mud); ' and people murmured amongst themselves, saying, ' He needs matipa (mud), some said, 'No, he needs matope (mud).' Thirdly they heard the words of one of the chiefs saying, 'I want lusisi (fibre);' again people did not know, some said, 'He wants nzizi (fibre);' some said, 'He wants maluzi (fibre).' Now all the chiefs came down from the roof top, they said, ‘All of you who say, 'Nkwangwa, Matope and Maluzi follow Undi, because you are Chewas. And you who say, Katemo, Matika and Nzizi,' follow Kalindawalo; You are Nsengas. And you who say, 'Izembe, Matipa and Lusisi,' follow Mambwe, you are Kundas."

The Kunda language is one of the 72 ethnic tribes and dialects officially recognized by the government of the Republic of Zambia. However, due to many similarities with the Nsenga language or even Chewa, some publications like the Ethnologue have erroneously listed it as a dialect of these two languages.

Over time the Kunda language, like any other living language, has undergone changes due to influences from languages that surround it. The change of the Kunda language is more evident when one listens to one Kunda variety called Chiŵetwe which is still spoken in Nsefu chiefdom, and compare this with the Kunda varieties that are spoken in other parts of the Kunda-land. It is a dialect of Bisa. Kundas sometimes refer to Chiŵetwe as ‘real Kunda’ or as a more ‘authentic Kunda’.

Tribes that surround the Kundas are the Nsenga, the Chewa, the Ngoni, the Ambo and the Bisa. Apart from Chiŵiza (Bisa) which is very much similar to Chiŵetwe, two languages, Chinsenga and Chichewa, have had the most influence on the Kunda language.

The above-mentioned factors have accelerated the creation of a middle-of-the-way Kunda language variety loosely referred to by the many as Kunda-Nsenga. This term refers to a mixture of Nsenga and Kunda a variety which has become the lingua franca of Kunda-land. However, recent studies show that, although it shares a larger percentage in terms of similarity with these languages, it is a language distinct from Chinsenga or Chichewa. A word study of these languages is therefore important in understanding the differences and uniqueness of these two languages:

Comparison of Kunda with four other languages

Nsenga	72.60 %
Chewa	50.00 %
Bisa	47.80 %
Chikunda	43.20 %

According to the Ethnologue, for a language to qualify to be called a dialect of another language, it has to show 85% or more lexical similarity. But results of wordlists collected in different parts of Kunda land, in a recently conducted linguistic survey by PIBT (2013), shows that although Nsenga shares a lot of lexical similarities (72.6%) with the Kunda language, more than any other language, it does not reach the 85% threshold that may warrant it to be called a dialect of the Nsenga language. Therefore, it should be considered as language separate and distinct from Nsenga and Chewa. Kunda is listed as one of the two languages with the same name: ISO 639-3

There is little published materials in the Kunda language. As a result, the Kunda people have been mistakenly identified with other ethnic groups and due to contact with other languages, the Kunda language has suffered negatively and is in danger of dying.
