= Central African Airways =

African airline (1946–1967)

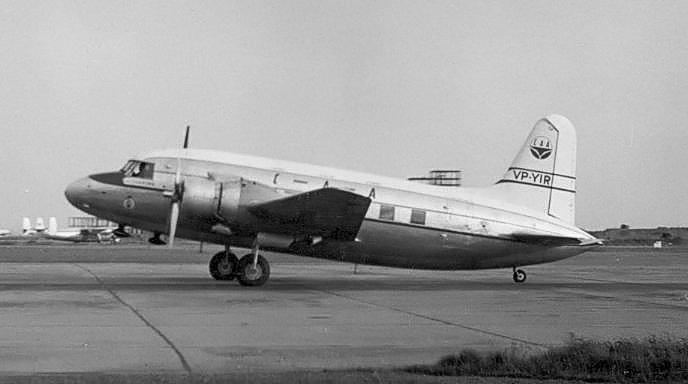
IATA	ICAO	Call sign
CE	CAA	-
- Founded: 1946
- Ceased operations: 1967 (split up into Zambia Airways, Air Malawi and Air Rhodesia)
- Hubs: Belvedere Airport (1946–1956); Salisbury Airport (1956–1967)
- Focus cities: Lusaka Airport; Ndola Airport
- Headquarters: Salisbury, Southern Rhodesia
- Key people: Sir Charles Warburton Meredith; The 1st Baron Robins

Central African Airways (CAA) was a supranational airline corporation serving as flag carrier for Southern Rhodesia, Northern Rhodesia and Nyasaland (respectively the present day countries of Zimbabwe, Zambia and Malawi), which were organised as the Federation of Rhodesia and Nyasaland, also known as the Central African Federation, from 1953 to 1963. Based in Salisbury, it offered an extensive network of domestic passenger and cargo flights, as well as international services to major cities in Southern and Central Africa, and a route to London. In 1960, CAA owned 15 aircraft and had 1,155 employees.

== History ==
Prior to the Second World War, commercial flights in Southern Rhodesia were offered by Southern Rhodesia Air Services (SRAS), whilst Northern Rhodesia and Nyasaland had a joined airline company called Rhodesia and Nyasaland Airways (RANA). In 1946, it was decided to consolidate the airline operations of the three territories into one corporation, thus creating Central African Airways. Air Vice-Marshal Sir Charles Warburton Meredith served as founding chairman, overseeing an initial fleet of fifteen de Havilland Dragon Rapide, five Avro Anson, one de Havilland Tiger Moth and one de Havilland Leopard Moth, all of which had previously been operated by the respective air forces. Originally, the airline was headquartered at Belvedere Airport (serving Salisbury, now demolished). Between 1948 and 1949, two Bristol Freighters joined the fleet.

To get larger and more modern aircraft, CAA purchased three Vickers VC.1 Viking and five de Havilland Dove, the first of which were delivered in 1947. The Vikings formed the backbone for mainline passenger flights until their withdrawal from service in 1958, most notably (since 1953) the "Colonial Coach Service", linking Salisbury, Ndola and Lusaka with London. The Doves were intended to be used for so called bush flights to poorly prepared landing strips, but proved unsuitable for the prevailing hot and high conditions. Therefore, from 1951 onwards, they were replaced by de Havilland Beavers, which had the desired STOL capabilities.

Under the leadership of Sir Ellis Robins (later created, in 1958, The 1st Baron Robins), who had taken over as chairman in 1947, another modernisation took place when the Vickers Viscount was introduced with CAA on 25 April 1956. With a seating capacity of 52, this was a significantly higher capacity than the 24 passengers of a Viking. In the same year, Salisbury Airport was opened, and CAA moved its hub and headquarters to the new facilities. The new airport attracted foreign airlines (most notably South African Airways), so that for the first time, Central African Airways experienced competitors on its international routes. As a result, the financial situation worsened and A. E. P. Robinson became new chairman in 1957.

No further growth of the route network occurred over the following years. With the Douglas C-47 Dakota, another aircraft type was introduced, which allowed for both passenger and cargo flights. During the 1960s, Central African Airways ordered two BAC One-Eleven-207 aircraft, but delivery was blocked by United Nations sanctions following UDI and one Douglas DC-6 which was leased from Alitalia between 1962 and 1965.

In the wake of the decolinization of Africa and the African independence movements, the Federation of Rhodesia and Nyasaland was dissolved on 31 December 1963. In 1964, the independent states of Zambia and Malawi were proclaimed in Northern Rhodesia and Nyasaland. To recognise this move, Zambia Airways and Air Malawi were founded as wholly owned subsidiaries of Central African Airways, taking over the route network in the respective countries. In 1965, Air Rhodesia was founded as a third CAA subsidiary. Thenceforth, only the prestigious international flights from Salisbury to London and Johannesburg were operated under the Central African Airways brand. In 1967, Zambia Airways, Air Malawi and Air Rhodesia decided to become independent of each other, and CAA was disestablished.

== Route network ==
During the 1950s and early 1960s, CAA offered scheduled flights to the following destinations. Please note: This list follows the then valid naming of countries, cities and airports.

Belgian Congo

- Elisabethville – Elisabethville Airport

Colony and Protectorate of Kenya (British)

- Mombasa – Mombasa Airport
- Nairobi – Nairobi Airport

Italy

- Rome – Fiumicino Airport (stopover)

Libya

- Benghazi – Benina Airport (stopover)

British Malta

- Luqa – Malta Airport (stopover)

Portuguese Mozambique

- Beira – Beira Airport
- Lourenço Marques – Lourenço Marques Airport

Nyasaland

- Blantyre – Blantyre Airport
- Dedza
- Fort Hill
- Fort Johnston
- Karonga – Karonga Airport
- Kasungu – Kasungu Airport
- Lilongwe – Lilongwe Airport
- Monkey Bay
- Mzimba
- Mzuzu – Mzuzu Airport
- Salima
- Zomba – Zomba Airport

Northern Rhodesia

- Abercorn
- Balovale
- Broken Hill
- Fort Jameson – Fort Jameson Airport
- Kasama
- Livingstone – Livingstone Airport
- Lusaka – Lusaka Airport (secondary hub)
- Mankoya
- Mongu – Mongu Airport
- Ndola – Ndola Airport (secondary hub)
- Senanga
- Sesheke

Southern Rhodesia

- Bulawayo – Bulawayo Airport
- Fort Victoria – Fort Victoria Airport
- Gatooma
- Gwelo
- Que Que
- Salisbury – Salisbury International Airport (primary hub)
- Umtali – Umtali Airport
- Victoria Falls – Victoria Falls Airport
- Shabani – Shabani Airport

South Africa

- Durban – Louis Botha International Airport
- Johannesburg – Jan Smuts International Airport

Sudan

- Wadi Halfa – Wadi Halfa Airport (stopover)

Tanganyika Territory

- Dar es Salaam – Dar es Salaam Airport
- Mbeya
- Tabora – Tabora Airport

British Protectorate of Uganda

- Entebbe – Entebbe International Airport

United Kingdom

- London – London Heathrow Airport

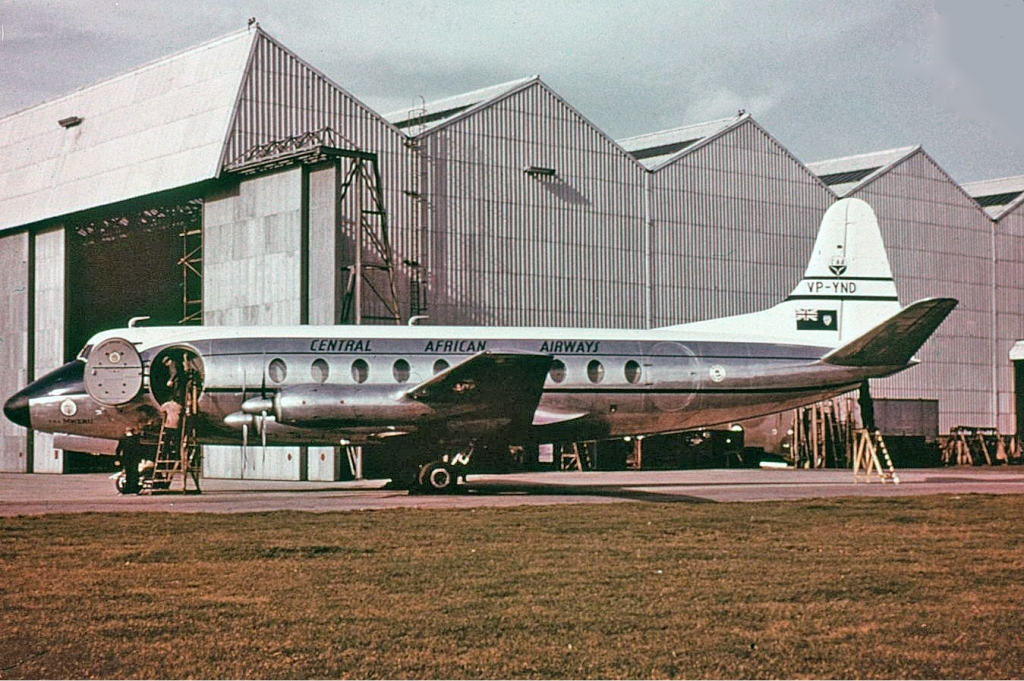
A Vickers Viscount of Central African Airways at Heathrow Airport in 1957.

Central African Airways (CAA) was a member of the Quadripartite agreements with South African Airways (SAA), East African Airways (EAA) and British Overseas Airways Corporation (BOAC), thus allowing its passengers to be booked on any of the four airlines.

== Accidents and incidents ==
- On 29 March 1953, the thirteen people (eight passengers, five crew) on board a CAA flight from Blantyre to Dar es Salaam died in a plane crash. The aircraft, a Vickers VC.1 Viking (registered VP-YEY) disintegrated in mid-air during stormy weather conditions. It was determined that several bolts had failed because of corrosion damage due to poor fabrication standards.
- The flight engineer of Flight 626 lost his life in an accident that occurred on 23 February 1955. The CAA Douglas C-47B (registered VP-YKO) encountered smoke in the cabin right after take-off from Belvedere Airport (Salisbury) for a flight to Lusaka, prompting the pilots to execute an emergency belly landing at 09:20 local time. The left wing propeller crashed through the aircraft hull, killing the engineer. The remaining four crew members and 21 passengers survived.
- Only a few weeks later, on 17 March 1955, another CAA aircraft was destroyed at Belvedere Airport. Flight 120 (a Vickers VC.1 Viking, registered VP-YEX) had originated in Johannesburg with 23 passengers and five crew and crashed upon approaching its destination airport in poor weather conditions. All people on board survived.
- On 5 October 1956, the two pilots of a training flight died when their aircraft, a Vickers Viking (registration VP-YMO), crashed near Salisbury.
- The worst accident in the history of Central African Airways occurred on 9 August 1958, when Flight 890 from Salisbury to London crashed while approaching Benghazi Airport for a stopover, killing 36 of the 54 people on board.
