= Chikunda =

Afro-Portuguese slave soldiers

Chikunda, sometimes rendered as Achicunda, was the name given from the 18th century onwards to the slave-warriors of the Afro-Portuguese estates known as Prazos in Zambezia, Mozambique. They were used to defend the prazos and police their inhabitants. Many of the chikunda were originally chattel slaves, raised to the status of soldiers, traders or administrators of parts of the prazo as a client or unfree dependent.

The prazo system based on agriculture broke down as a result of drought and disease in the early 19th century and was replaced by a small number of virtually independent states in the Zambezi valley that were based on the trade in slaves and ivory. The name ‘’’Achikunda’’’ was then applied to groups of professional soldiers in these minor states, who were rewarded with a share of the profits of those trades. Although these minor states were mainly in Mozambique, a small number extended their influence into what are now parts of Zambia and Malawi.

The minor states in and around the Zambezi River valley were brought under closer Portuguese control as a result of the Scramble for Africa, which required colonial powers to bring territories they claimed under their jurisdiction, the doctrine of "effective occupation". Between 1891 and 1902, the Mozambique Company took control of this area and the former roles of the chikunda in securing slaves and ivory and providing internal and external security for those states became redundant, although many ex-chikunda were involved in the Barue uprising of 1917 to 1918 against the Portuguese government. A few communities along the Zambezi and Luangwa river valleys preserve their chikunda heritage, although most former chikunda have merged into their host communities.

== Chikunda origins ==
=== The prazos ===
Since the 16th century, the Portuguese Crown, which claimed ownership of the land in Mozambique, had leased crown lands in the Zambezi valley to Portuguese subjects under grants termed “prazos da coroa” (crown leases), nominally for three lives, with the aim of promoting development and enabling possible European settlement. In theory, a prazo grant could be cancelled if the lessee (or prazeiro) did not occupy and develop the land, or later deserted it, although in practice the prazo grants were renewed and became hereditary. The prazo holder was responsible for administering justice in the land comprised in his grant and also collecting taxes from its inhabitants, out of which he was supposed to pay an annual rent to the crown, and to maintain sufficient armed retainers to keep the peace. The prazeiros only rarely removed the local chiefs resident on their estates, preferring to retain them as subordinates, and few attempted to start commercial agriculture, but expropriated the surplus products of their peasants and also profited from the trade in ivory and slaves. The prazos varied greatly in size and number, but in 1763 there were 22 in the captaincy of Sena and 54 in the captaincy of Tete, of which three extended over hundreds of square miles but others included only a few villages.

The Afro-Portuguese prazo holders, known locally from at least the early 17th century as “muzungos”, signifying a white man, boss or patron, were of diverse origin and, although most claimed at least some connection with metropolitan Portugal, many had original links with Portuguese India and all, after many generations of intermarriage with African women, were African in appearance and culture. By the mid-18th century, as the largely African prazo owners followed local customs of matrilineal inheritance, a number of women, known as the Zambezi donas, became owners of prazos and were succeeded by their daughters rather than their sons.

=== The early chikunda ===
In the 17th and early 18th centuries, the term “chikunda” was not in general use for the armed retainers of a prazeiro, who could include chattel slaves. However, although many chattel slaves were acquired by capture or purchase to undertake agricultural work, mining or as house-servants or craftsmen on the prazos, it was normal from the mid-18th century for the retainers who became soldiers or administrators to offer themselves as voluntary unfree dependents in return for protection and a prospect of advancement and enrichment. By the mid-18th century, the term chikunda, which probably derives from the bantu word kunda means “to conquer”, was reserved for the armed clients of the prazo owners, and other designations were used for personal or household slaves. The chikunda of each prazo came from diverse backgrounds, because prazeiros preferred recruits without local ties, but they developed a loyalty to the group to which they belonged. They were often recruited from areas of conflict or famine, offering themselves voluntarily or, in some cases, coming as captives.

At their height in the 17th century, individual prazeiros such as António Lobo da Silva could have upwards of 5000 chikunda, some reputedly owning as many as 15000. In the mid-eighteenth century, the total chikunda population in Zambezia was estimated at 50000. In a survey of 1766, the two largest prazos were said to have around 700 and 500 chikunda. In early times, the chikunda were usually armed with bows and spears but, by the mid-18th century, some were armed with muskets. The chikunda usually lived in small fortified villages, often near the margins of the larger prazos. Each chikunda village was headed by the owner's deputy called a capitão, or headman. These villages generally produced food to support the chikunda and also made a contribution in cash or goods to their master. If the prazo owner was strong, the chikunda acted as a defence and police force, keeping order and collecting tribute, but under a weak owner or in times of famine, they could become little more than bandits, preying on local communities and disregarding their nominal patron.

Individuals were incorporated into the ranks of the chikunda through a ritual under which they swore lifelong loyalty to the prazeiro. However prosperous or anarchic they might become, the chikunda could only rarely become completely free of their patron, who guaranteed their status as warriors and their security. Some chikunda did manage to break away from their masters, leave their prazo and hunt for ivory in the Shire valley, where they competed with Yao traders in the mid-18th century

=== Decline of the prazos ===
The great Mozambique drought of 1794 to 1802 and subsequent droughts and smallpox epidemics lasting into the 1830s destroyed the agricultural economy of the Zambezia prazos, as the cultivators could not feed themselves, let alone produce surpluses to maintain the chikunda and prazeiros. Many chikunda deserted their prazos and some formed armed bands seeking any means to survive, thus worsening the situation created by drought. Other former chikunda returned, or attempted to return, to their homelands and resume their old lives, or merged into the local peoples as peasants. A few used their military skills to become elephant hunters and, in the time of Ndebele incursions, they used their guns against the invaders. Some chikunda elephant hunters travelled as far north as the area around Nkhotakota and the Luangwa valley in search of new herds to exploit. They married women from the local Chewa and Tumbuka peoples and their offspring soon lost their identity as chikunda.

== The 19th century chikunda ==
=== The Afro-Goan statelets ===
By the 1840s, many of the former prazo owners that had survived the droughts and epidemics had left Zambezia and were replaced by five powerful families along the middle Zambezi, the da Cruz, Caetano Pereira, Vas dos Anjos, Ferrão and Alves da Silva, who were joined in the 1860s by a sixth family, the de Sousa. There were also several less prominent Afro-Portuguese families in this area and on the fringes of Portuguese influence. Most of these families were of Indian, or specifically Goanese, origin, although the original Alves da Silva were from Portugal, and all relief on the slave trade, despite its legal abolition in 1830, or elephant hunting, rather than agriculture. Through intermarriage with the families of leading African chiefs, they were recognised as the legitimate holders of several chieftaincies by their African subjects and they adopted African titles and the indigenous symbols of kingship and patronised local religious cults, yet also received Portuguese offices or military ranks that gave them an official status.

The areas controlled by the main families far exceeded those of earlier prazos, and they maintained large numbers of armed chikunda, said to number several thousand, although estimates vary. Their military strength was based on a combination of strong defensive fortifications and European firearms, including breech-loading rifles later in the 19th century. Their centres were fortified towns, called aringas, which were a development of the traditional stockaded village. Each aringa consisted of a wooden stockade, supported by earthworks in the form of a ditch and bank, often with inner walls protecting the more important sections of the town. One large aringa, Massangano, had fortifications 1,300 metres long and 150 to 180 metres wide.

These mainly Afro-Goan families formed what were in effect small independent states, giving at best token allegiance to the Portuguese crown. From the 1840s, their leaders attempted to extend their influence, either by forcing neighbouring African chiefs to acknowledge their sovereignty or driving out those that resisted. The less prominent families included the Rosário Andrade, whose head was known as Kanyembe and who operated along the Upper Zambezi west of Zumbo, now the westernmost town in Mozambique, and the Arujo Lobo, whose head was called Matakenya and who operated in the Luangwa and Lower Shire valleys. The chikunda of these two families had a reputation for exceptional savagery, never trading with local peoples but taking slaves and ivory by force, disrupting local agriculture and causing famine. One economic reason behind their expansion was the increasing demand for ivory, which had already led to the depletion of elephant herds in many areas nearer the coast and to the search for new ivory sources inland; in areas that could supply little ivory, slaves were taken instead.

=== The chikunda revived ===
In this period, the term chikunda (or achikunda with the collective prefix) was applied exclusively to the professional soldiers of the Afro-Goan or Afro-Portuguese families. These families maintained large numbers of chikunda, each having several thousand armed men at their disposal. The chikunda had ceased to be clients of the prazeros when the Zambezia agricultural system had collapsed, and they were now recruited through gifts of modern weapons, land or wives, and retained by being allowed to share of the profits of slave raiding. Some physically fit slaves were also selected, mostly from those areas north of the Zambezi that were the focus of raiding for slaves. Each of the Zambezia states had a significant force of chikunda divided into regiments, usually based near the borders of its territory to facilitate slave raiding and as protection against external threats.

The 19th century chikunda set themselves apart from the populations among which they were quartered by living in separate villages and using a mixed language among themselves, containing elements from the chikundas’ Shona and Mang'anja home languages, and also Sena and Tonga terms from the local people, with some Portuguese phrases. They disdained agriculture but took part in tax collection, trading, slave raiding and ivory hunting, as well as military duties and, although many came from matrilineal societies, the chikunda observed patrilineal descent and venerated the spirits of former chikunda, rather than their own ancestral spirits. To further distinguish themselves from local peasant farmers, chikunda had their own patterns of facial tattoos, filed their teeth and wore imported Calico cloth, whereas most local people wore Barkcloth.

=== The Zambezi wars ===
Portuguese attempts to co-opt the rulers of these minor Afro-Goan and Afro-Portuguese states into the colonial system by granting them full legal title to the land they occupied, tax exemptions and even sums of cash generally failed. Although these statelets extended the area of nominal Portuguese influence westward and fought off invading Ngoni incursions, their forces were used not only against indigenous African rulers but, from 1849, in fighting among themselves and even against any government forces sent against them.

Until 1868, the governors of Mozambique and Tete had few troops of their own and preferred to use the chikunda of any prazeiros loyal to the Portuguese government or from any minor state opposed to whatever ruler they targeted, rather than using soldiers from metropolitan Portugal or Goa. These nominally loyal chikunda had been used with some success in the 1850s against slave trading by the Sultan of Angoche and the Pereira family, but two families continued to give the Portuguese governors trouble: the Vas dos Anjos in the lower Shire and the da Cruz, who ruled a section of the middle Zambezi in Manica and Tete provinces, centred on the aringa of Massangano. The Vas dos Anjos were forced out of their aringa at Shamo, near the junction of the Shire and Zambezi in 1858, but were allowed to regroup further north up the Shire, near its confluence with the Ruo River; the da Cruz posed much more of a problem.

After successes against Angoche and the Pereira and Vas dos Anjos families, the governor of Tete, Miguel Gouveia, assembled a force of chikunda from the prazos around Tete in July 1867 to attack Massangano, which was only a few days march away. However, Gouveia's force was ambushed by da Cruz chikunda while on route to Massangano: most of the government chikunda were massacred and Gouveia himself was executed by the da Cruz forces. Between November 1867 and May 1869, three more expeditions were sent against Massangano, with increasing numbers of troops from Portugal and Goa, artillery and assistance from the chikunda of the de Sousa state of Gorongosa. Each failed because of poor organisation, the effects of malaria on European soldiers and the desertion of local forces.

The expedition of November 1867, mounted in the rainy season, managed to blockade the Massangano aringa, but it ran out of supplies and ammunition and withdrrw in good order. The next expedition (May 1868) managed to besiege Massangano and caused significant casualties among its defenders. However, the da Cruz chikunda counterattacked and routed the government forces, causing them heavy casualties. The last and largest expedition (May 1869) was partly defeated by its own size as there was insufficient river transport for the troops and their supplies. Da Cruz chikunda harassed those Portuguese forces that had to march overland to Massangano and their supply lines to such an extent that they could not invest the aringa. Once they began to retreat, the chikunda made night attacks that caused the Portuguese forces to scatter with heavy losses. Although the da Cruz were subsequently left in peace for about 20 years, and recognised as effectively autonomous, they made little use of their military successes and never became more than a bandit state, based on the slave trade and the tolls they could impose on river traffic, as they occupied a sparsely populated and infertile area.

The formal abolition of the institution of slavery in Mozambique 1875 and of the prazo system in 1878 had little immediate effect on the Afro-Goan and Afro-Portuguese families. Just as the formal abolition of the slave trade in 1830 had simply promoted a clandestine trade that lasted into the 20th century, so the abolition of slavery made no immediate change to the unfree status and situation of the peasants in the minor states.

=== Chikunda states ===
As economical and environmental degradation coupled with upheaval and migration of peoples took its toll on the prazos, certain ex-chikunda took the initiative and fled north or west to establish their own states, modelled on the prazos. The most successful of these may have been José Rosário de Andrade, known as Kanyemba ("the ferocious"), who began assembling a private army in the 1870s and settled in the region of Bawa, two hundred kilometers west of Tete, from which he either traded with or raided the surrounding countryside. In the 1880s, this warlord was said to have 10000 chikunda at arms. Andrade died in the late nineteenth century, and by 1903 the Portuguese would defeat his state along with the rest of runaway chikunda forces.

== The end of the chikunda ==
=== The Scramble for Africa ===
In the second half of the 19th century, several European powers had increasing interests in Africa that could challenge Portugal's territorial claims, as it had no effective presence in the area between Angola and Mozambique, and little in many areas within the present borders of those countries. Although the Portuguese Minister of Marine, Andrade Corvo, who also had responsibility for the overseas territories, attempted bilateral negotiations with Britain in 1879, 1882 and 1884 to fix the Ruo River (now the south-eastern border of Malawi) as the northern limit of Portuguese rule, these talks were overtaken by the Berlin Conference of 1884-85 and its requirement for effective occupation rather than claims based on early discovery or more recent exploration.

In 1880 Manuel António de Sousa, who has previously married a member of the royal family of Barue, which was adjacent to his statelet in Gorongosa, occupied Barue after the death of its ruler. Given its closeness to both the land route from Sena to Tete and the territory of the da Cruz family, the existence of an unfriendly ruler in Barue, particularly one in alliance with the da Cruz, could block any Portuguese attempts to link Angola and Mozambique. The de Sousa family had been allied with the Portuguese forces attacking Massangano, and the Portuguese government approved of Manuel António's occupation of Barue, although de Sousa did not recognise Barue as part of Mozambique. De Sousa built around thirty aringas in Barue and manned them with his chikunda. In 1884, he again made himself valuable to the government in helping to put down a revolt by supporters of the Vas dos Anjos, reportedly sending 10,000 of his chikunda against these rebels

The activities of the Rosário Andrade and Arujo Lobo families along the upper Zambezi prompted the Portuguese government to lay claim to the valley. By the late 1870s, both these families had pledged a vague loyalty to the Portuguese crown, and the Vas dos Anjos had been forced to submit to Portugal in 1884, leaving the da Cruz family at Massangano as the most prominent minor state in the area claimed by Portugal that insisted on its complete independence from the Portuguese crown. Following the Berlin Conference, this would leave the da Cruz territory open to a British takeover if it accepted British protection, as there were indications it might do.

Manuel António de Sousa then left for Lisbon where, in March 1888, he participated in arrangements that later led to the formation of the Mozambique Company. However, his plans for expansion were soon frustrated by the British South Africa Company, which also laid claim to the Mazoe area.

=== Colonial rule established ===
De Sousa's failure to secure more of northern Mashonaland in 1887 allowed Rhodes to contest Portuguese claims in that area. Rhodes' troops arrested de Sousa in 1890 and drove his chikunda out of parts of Barue and Rupire before the Anglo-Portuguese Treaty of 1891 assigned virtually all the contested areas to Portugal. However, after being released, de Sousa was unable to reestablish his control of Barue and was killed in 1892 while attempting to do so. Barue reverted to being an African kingdom, and much of de Sousa's original Gorongosa domain fell under the control of his former lieutenants.

The 1891 treaty prevented the chikunda of the Rosário Andrade and Arujo Lobo families from raiding in the areas of the Luangwa and Kafue valleys that were now British territory and from selling slaves to the Ndebele kingdom after it was conquered by the British South Africa Company in 1893. In Zambezia, the cipais (armed police) of the Mozambique Company gradually asserted control of the area comprised in the company's charter, taking over the chikunda's police and tax gathering roles, but it wouldn't be until 1902 that the last of the chikunda states came completely under Portuguese control

One of the last such states was the so-called Military Republic of Maganja da Costa. The Maganja da Costa District had become the stronghold of the Afro-Portuguese Alves da Silva family after the final banning of the legal slave trade in 1830, and contained a number of aringas manned by the family's chikunda. After the deaths of João Bonifacio Alves da Silva in 1861 and of his brother Victorino Romão in 1874, the territory they had controlled became a chikunda republic, with effective power devolved to the captains of each aringa. However, by the early 1890s, this chikunda statelet was in decline, following the suppression of the illicit slave trade. In 1897, the Portuguese raised an armed force from their own chikunda to extend colonial rule in the Zambezi valley, and Maganja da Costa was conquered by Portuguese forces in 1898. A chieftaincy established by the Caetano Pereira family north of the Zambezi was occupied in 1902, and Barue, which had regained independence in 1891, was occupied by Portuguese forces that same year.

Some of the displaced chikunda resorted to banditry, favouring the areas on either side of the Mozambican borders with the Rhodesias. Although Barue had returned to Portuguese rule in 1902, a succession dispute broke out in 1917, when as many as 15,000 former chikunda revolted against the Portuguese and created aringas in Barue and the Zambezi valley. However, the Portuguese raised a much larger force, mainly of auxiliaries from the Nguni peoples, that broke the back of the rebellion by the end of 1917, although fighting on a smaller scale continued through 1918. Even before the Barue Revolt, the chikunda ceased to exist as an active institution and most merged into the general population, but their descendant's identification as chikunda has been preserved in a number of remote communities around the confluence of the Zambezi and Luangwa rivers.

Other former chikunda, together with many Sena people, entered southern Nyasaland after the Portuguese invasion and conquest of Barue in 1901 and 1902 and the introduction by of a system of forced labour there. The name chikunda or Kunda was mistakenly applied at that time as an ethnic designation to all the people from the Zambezi valley of what is now the Zambezia province of Mozambique and parts of Zambia who had migrated into the lower Shire valley, regardless of whether they came from chikunda families or not. These people were later more correctly called the Sena from their dominant ethnic group.

== Sources ==
- Dicionário Online de Português. https://www.dicio.com.br/muzungo/
- A F Isaacman and B Isaacman, (1976). The Tradition of Resistance in Mozambique: The Zambezi Valley, 1850–1921, University of California Press.ISBN 978-0-52003-065-7.
- A Isaacman, M Mulwafu and M Mulwafu (1999), From Slaves to Freedmen: The Impact of the Chikunda on Malawian Society,1850-1920, The Society of Malawi Journal, Vol. 52, No. 2, pp. 1.32.
- A Isaacman, (2000). Chikunda Transfrontiersmen and Transnational Migrations in Pre-Colonial South Central Africa, ca 1850–1900, Zambezia, Vol XXVII, ISSUE II, pp. 109–138.
- A Isaacman and D Peterson, (2003). Making the Chikunda: Military Slavery and Ethnicity in Southern Africa, 1750–1900, The International Journal of African Historical Studies, Vol. 36, No. 2, pp. 257– 281
- P E Lovejoy, (2011). Transformations in Slavery: A History of Slavery in Africa (3rd edition), Cambridge University Press. ISBN 978-1-10700-296-8.
- J McCraken, (2012). A History of Malawi, 1859–1966, Woodbridge, James Currey. ISBN 978-1-84701-050-6.
- M D D Newitt, (1973). Portuguese Settlement on the Zambesi: Exploration, Land Tenure, and Colonial Rule in East Africa, New York, Africana Publishing Co. ISBN 0-84190-132-5.
- M Newitt, (1995). A History of Mozambique, London, Hurst & Co. ISBN 1-85065-172-8.
- E Rodrigues (2006), As donas de prazos do Zambeze: Políticas imperiais e estratégias locais, VI Jornada Setecentista, pp. 15–34
