= Likoma Airport =

Airport in Malawi

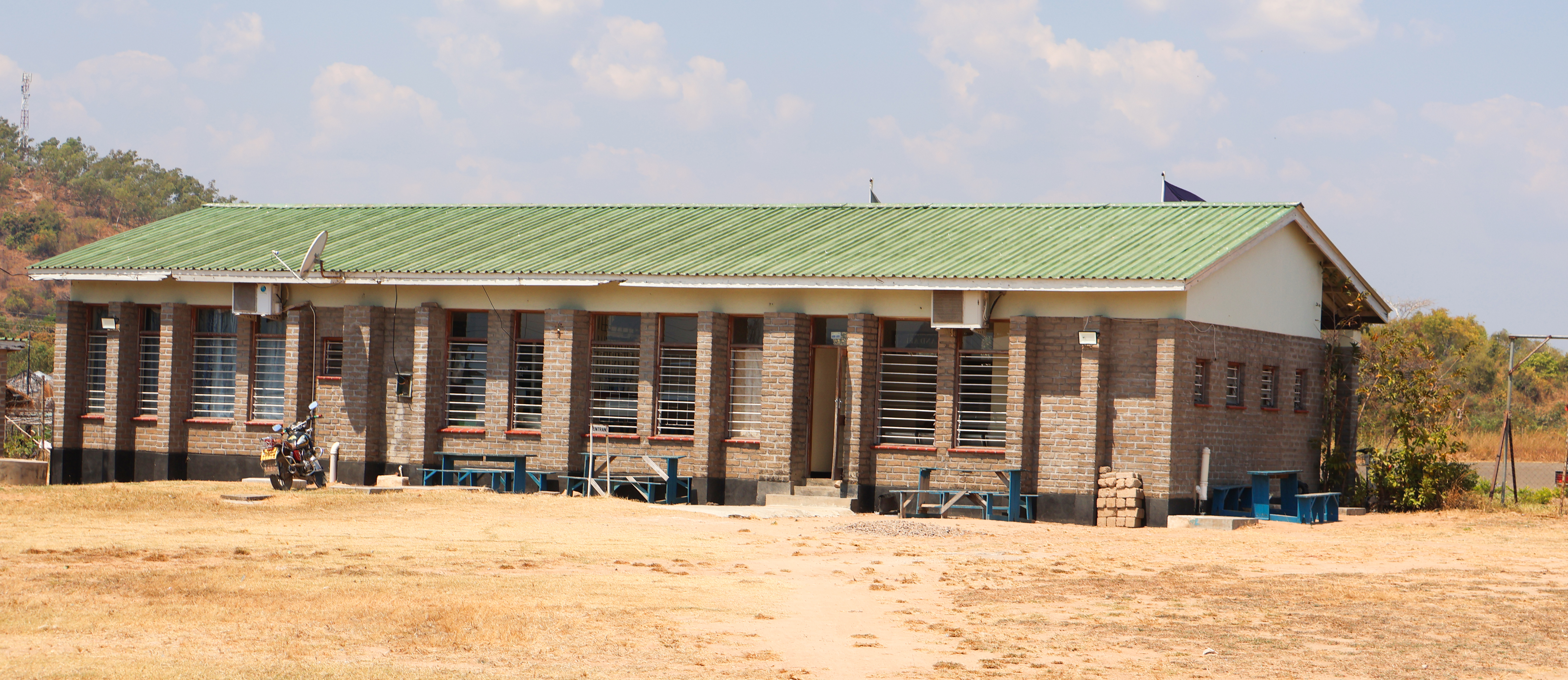
- in 2026
- IATA: LIX; ICAO: FWLK

Summary
- Airport type: Public
- Operator: Airport Development Limited (ADL)
- Serves: Likoma Island
- Elevation AMSL: 1,632 ft (497 m)
- Coordinates: 12°04′33″S 34°44′14″E
- Website: www.visitlikomaisland.com

Map
- Location of the airport in Malawi

Runways
Direction	Length		Surface
Direction	m	ft	Surface
01/19	1,130	3,707	Asphalt
- Sources: GCM Google Maps

Likoma Airport (IATA: LIX, ICAO: FWLK) is an airport on Likoma Island, Republic of Malawi. The island lies in Lake Malawi a few kilometres off the shore of Mozambique.

== Airlines and destinations ==
=== Passenger ===
Airlines	Destinations
Ulendo Airlink	Lilongwe, Liwonde, Majete, Mfuwe, Southern Lakeshore

== See also ==
- Transport in Malawi
- List of airports in Malawi
