= Norman Carr =

British conservationist

Norman Joseph Carr, MBE (19 July 1912 – 1 April 1997) was a British conservationist working in Central and Southern Africa. He was influential in setting up National Parks in Malawi (Nyasaland), Zambia and Zimbabwe (Rhodesia) in the 1950s and 1960s. In Zambia, his vision of Conservation through Tourism led him to set up the country's first safari company, Norman Carr Safaris, with a focus on local employment and empowerment. He is widely regarded as the pioneer of walking safaris as part of non-consumptive tourism (photography safaris) in Africa.

Carr helped establish the Rhino Trust in the 1970s (now under the WWF), helped return two lion cubs (Big Boy & Little Boy) to the wild, and provided wildlife education to local children in the South Luangwa Valley through the Kapani School Project, which has been running since 1986.

== Conservation through tourism ==
Carr was a man ahead of his time; during the era when safari was a track-and-hunt tradition, Norman Carr broke the mould and created conservation-based tourism.

In 1950 he petitioned Senior Chief Nsefu - Paramount Chief of the Kunda people in the Luangwa Valley - to set aside a portion of tribal land as a Game Reserve and built the first game viewing camp open to the public in Northern Rhodesia (now Zambia). Proceeds from this went back to the community and eco-tourism in Africa was born. His dream was to secure the future of this unique wilderness by ensuring that the local population would benefit through conservation of the wildlife and habitat of the Luangwa Valley. This led to the birth of Norman Carr Safaris, which operates 5 camps in the South Luangwa Valley.

Carr's legacy continues throughout Zambia as he inspired the next generation of conservationists, including Chris Liebenberg who founded Chongwe Safaris. Having grown up in Zambia, Liebenberg was influenced by Carr's values and wanted to replicate the conservation-through-tourism concept in the Lower Zambezi National Park. Both companies are now part of the tourist operation Time + Tide.

== Personal life ==
In 1940, he married Barbara Lennon, with whom he had one son and two daughters. They separated in the late 1950s.

== Death ==
He became sick and was taken to America where he received treatment, but died. He was cremated and his ashes were scattered in the famous Luangwa river. There is a monument built in his name in the depth of the South Luangwa National Park.

== Bibliography ==
- Return to the Wild (Collins 1962)
- The White Impala (Collins 1969)
- Some Common Trees and Shrubs of Luangwa Valley (1978)
- Valley of the Elephants (Collins 1980)
- A guide to the wildlife of the Luangwa Valley (Collins 1987)
- Kakuli (Old Buffalo) (CBC 1996)

== Filmography ==
- Return to the Wild
