= Mfuwe Airport =

Airport in Zambia

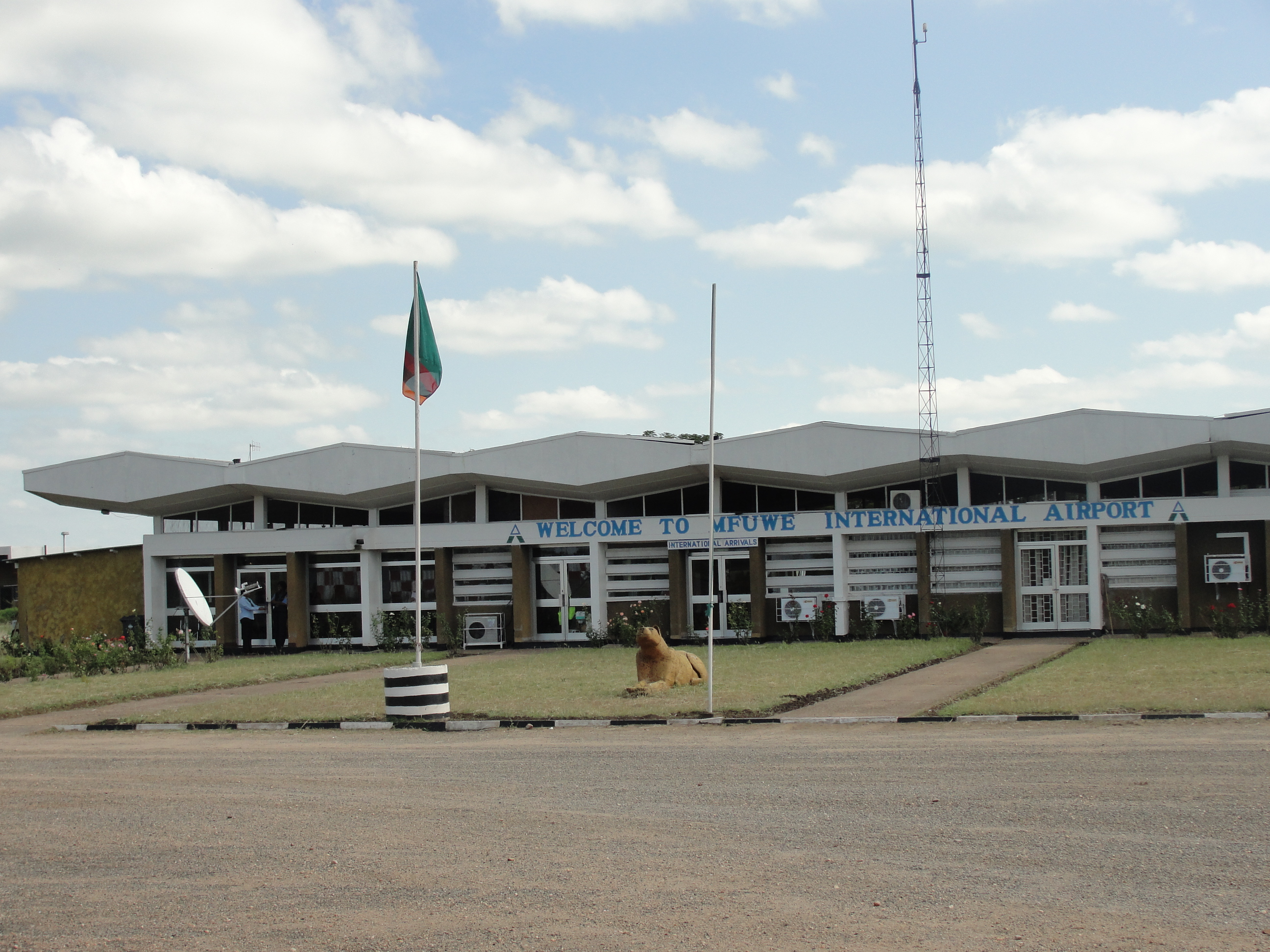
- IATA: MFU; ICAO: FLMF

Summary
- Airport type: Public / Military
- Serves: Mfuwe, Zambia
- Elevation AMSL: 1,853 ft (565 m)
- Coordinates: 13°15′32″S 31°56′10″E

Map
- Location of airport in Zambia

Runways
Direction	Length		Surface
Direction	m	ft	Surface
09/27	2,200	7,218	Asphalt
- Sources: WAD GCM

Mfuwe Airport (IATA: MFU, ICAO: FLMF) is an airport serving Mfuwe, a diffuse settlement in Mambwe District in the Eastern Province in Zambia. It serves the tourism industry based on the nearby South Luangwa National Park and other wildlife areas in the Luangwa Valley. It is one of four international airports in Zambia (declared an international airport in 1995), with seasonal international flights.

== Facilities ==
The airport elevation is 1,853 feet (565 m) above mean sea level. It has one runway.

== Airlines and destinations ==
Airlines	Destinations
Proflight Zambia	Lusaka
Ulendo Airlink	Likoma, Lilongwe, Liwonde, Majete, Southern Lakeshore
Zambia Airways	Lusaka

== See also ==
- Transport in Zambia
- List of airports in Zambia
