= Monkey Bay Airport =

Airport in Malawi

- IATA: MYZ; ICAO: FWMY

Summary
- Airport type: Public
- Serves: Monkey Bay
- Elevation AMSL: 1,580 ft / 482 m
- Coordinates: 14°05′00″S 34°55′11″E

Map
- Location of the airport in Malawi

Runways
Direction	Length		Surface
Direction	m	ft	Surface
01/19	1,000	3,281	Dirt
- Sources: Bing Maps GCM

Monkey Bay Airport (IATA: MYZ, ICAO: FWMY) is an airport serving the Lake Malawi port town of Monkey Bay, in the Southern Region of Malawi.

There is high terrain northwest of the airport.

== Airlines and destinations ==
=== Passenger ===
Airlines	Destinations
Ulendo Airlink	Lilongwe

== See also ==
- Transport in Malawi
- List of airports in Malawi
