= Nsanje Airport =

- IATA: none; ICAO: FWSJ

Summary
- Airport type: Public
- Serves: Nsanje
- Elevation AMSL: 200 ft / 61 m
- Coordinates: 16°55′10″S 35°15′10″E

Map
- Location of the airport in Malawi

Runways
| Direction | Length | | Surface |
| Direction | ft | m | Surface |
|---|---|---|---|
| 17/35 | 3,200 | 975 | Dirt |
- Sources: Google Maps GCM

Nsanje Airport (ICAO: FWSJ) is an airport serving the town of Nsanje, Republic of Malawi. The airport is within the town limits.

== See also ==
- Transport in Malawi
- List of airports in Malawi
