= FlyNyasa =

Airline of Malawi

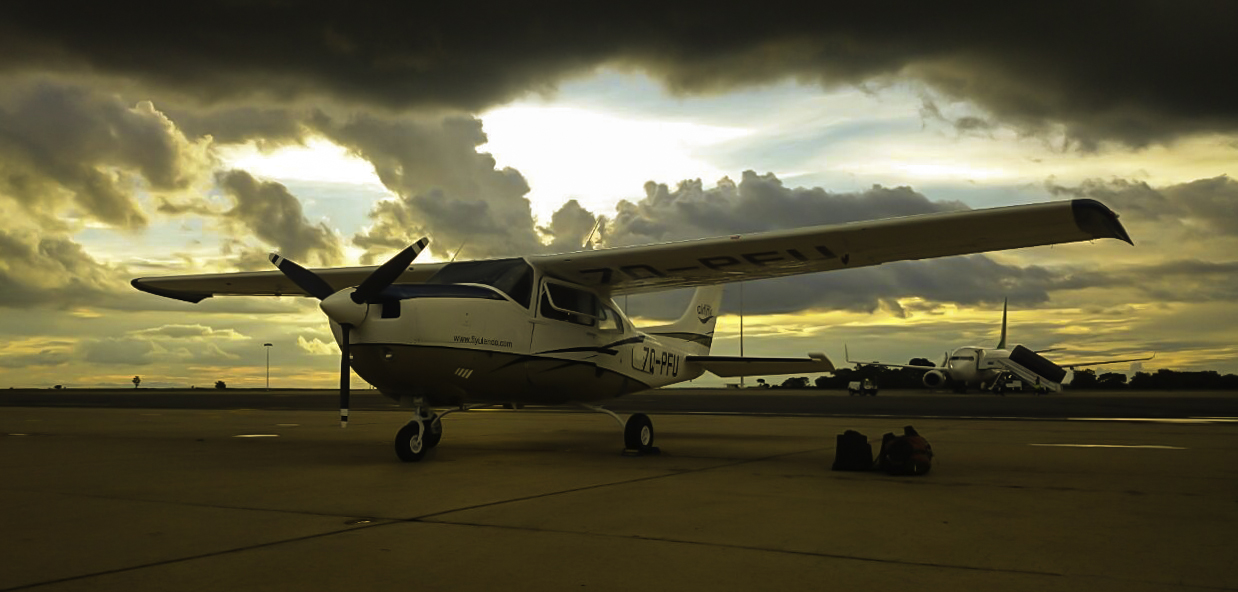
- Nyasa Express Cessna C210 - FWKI
IATA	ICAO	Call sign
-	NYS	NYASA
- Commenced operations: 2011
- AOC #: 2017
- Operating bases: Kamuzu International Airport
- Fleet size: 5
- Destinations: 10
- Parent company: Nyasa Express, Ltd.
- Headquarters: Lilongwe, Malawi
- Employees: 50
- Website: www.flynyasa.net

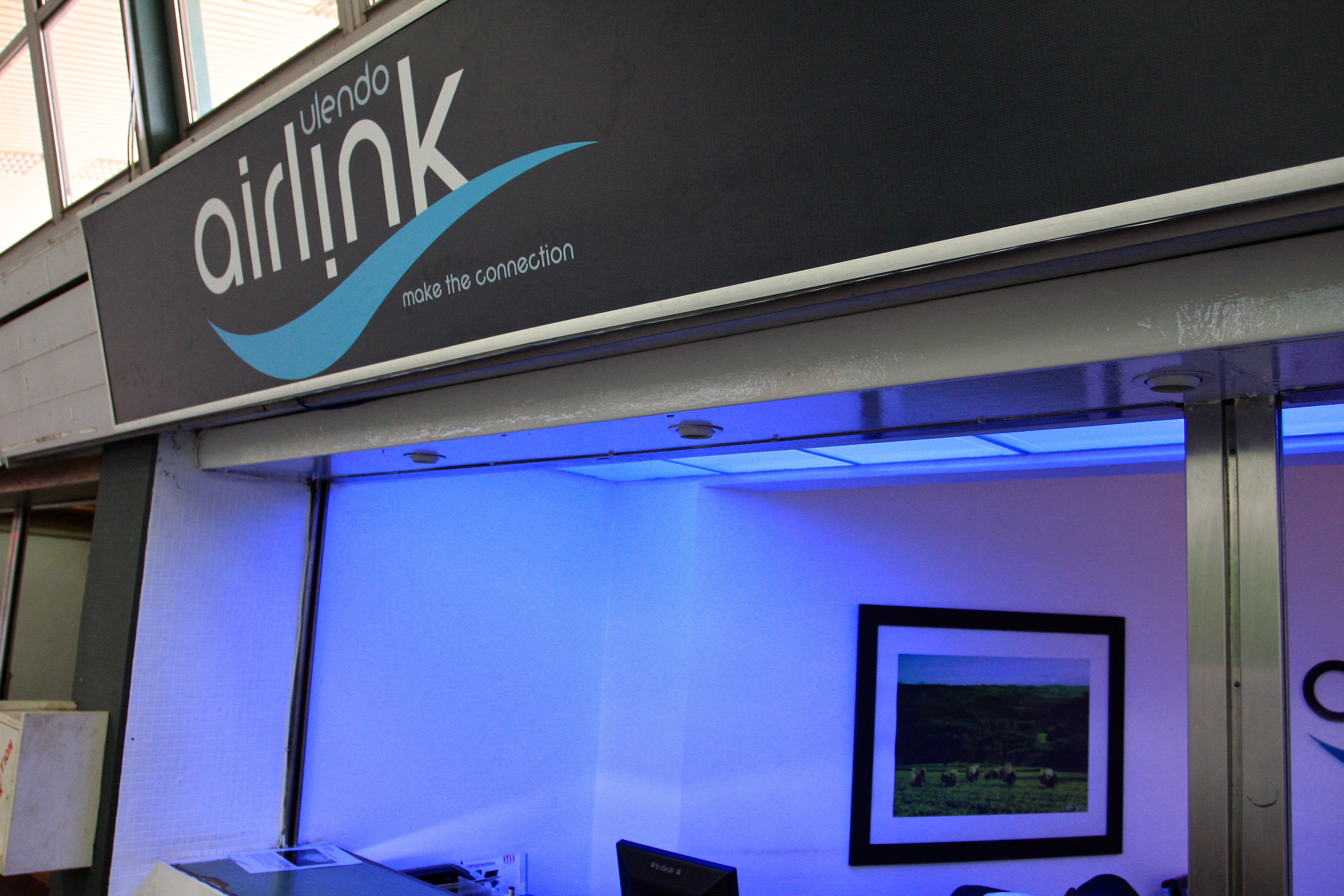
Ulendo Airlink Check-in Desk - Lilongwe, Malawi

Nyasa Express Limited, trading as FlyNyasa, is a Malawian charter airline that offers both seat rate and charter commercial air services from their base at Kamuzu International Airport in Lilongwe, Malawi. The company began operations in 2011 under the name Ulendo Airlink and rebranded in February 2022.

== Services ==
FlyNyasa provides corporate and charter services to nine domestic destinations and one destination in Zambia. The airline also provides air ambulance services through a partnership with KSB Medical.

== Destinations ==
Nyasa Express operates seat rate and charter flight services primarily for the safari and NGO markets to major and remote airstrips in Malawi and also conducts operations to Mfuwe, Zambia from Kamuzu International Airport on a regular basis. It serves the following destinations:

Malawi

- Likoma Island
- Club Makokola
- Liwonde National Park
- Nyika Plateau
- Blantyre
- Majete Wildlife Reserve
- Mzuzu
- Tongole
- Karonga

Zambia

- Mfuwe

== Fleet ==
As of May 2024, the airline's fleet consists of the following aircraft:

- Cessna 210 Centurion
- Cessna 208B Grand Caravan EX
- Beechcraft Super King Air 200
- Pilatus PC-12
- Embraer Legacy 650

== Accidents and incidents ==
- On 20 August 2024, a Cessna 210 aircraft flying from Nkhotakota to Liwonde crashed into Lake Malawi. A Dutch passenger was rescued, while another passenger and the pilot were reported missing.
