= Malawi Airlines =

Flag carrier of Malawi

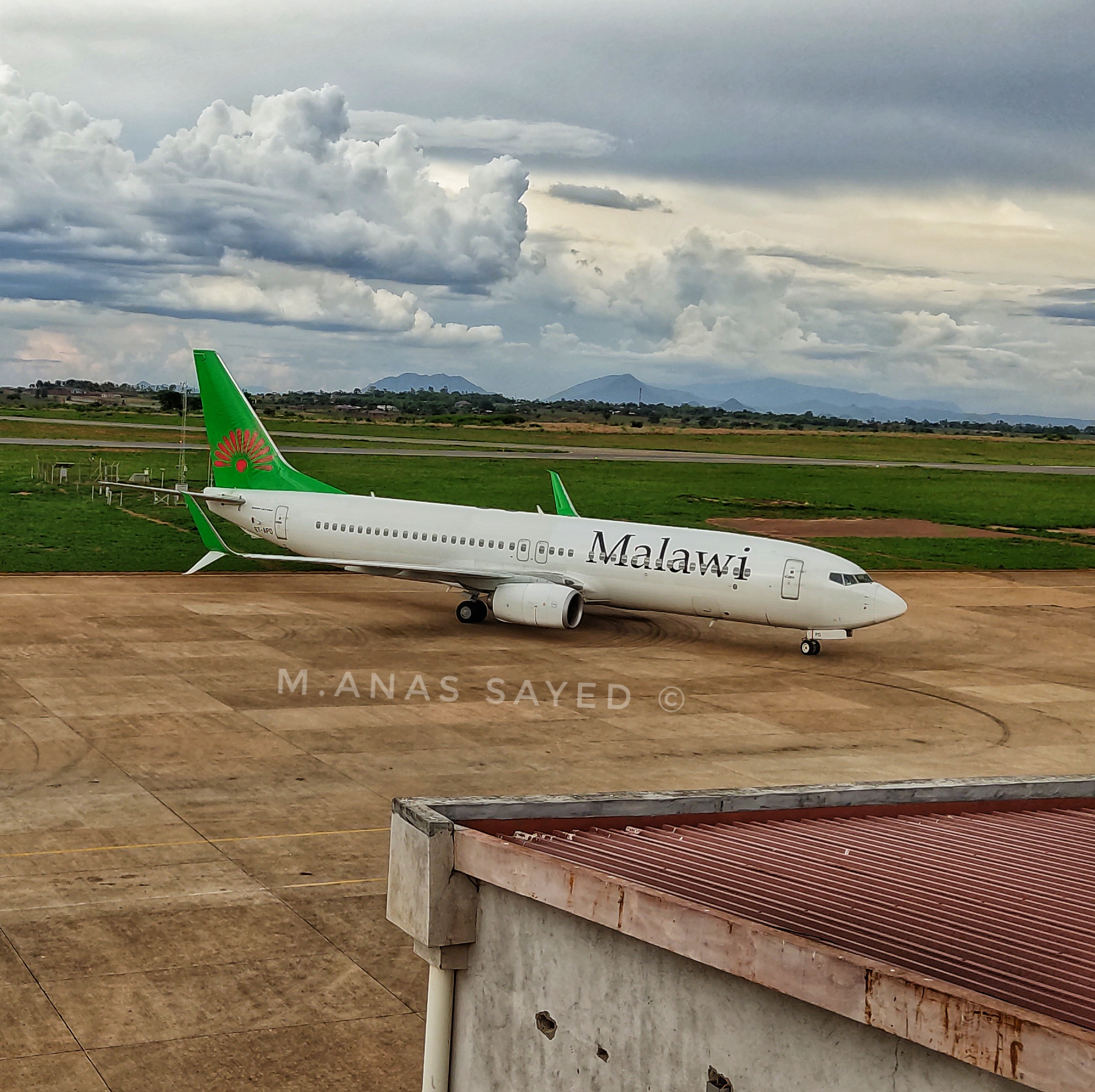
| IATA | ICAO | Call sign |
|---|---|---|
| 3W | MWI | MALAWIAN |
- Founded: July 2013
- Commenced operations: 31 January 2014
- Hubs: Kamuzu International Airport
- Focus cities: Chileka International Airport
- Fleet size: 3
- Destinations: 8
- Parent company: Malawian Government (51%)
- Headquarters: Lilongwe, Malawi
- Key people: Solomon Bekele (CEO)
- Employees: 71
- Website: www.malawian-airlines.com/aa

Malawi Airlines (Malawian Airlines until 2016) is the flag carrier airline of Malawi, based in Lilongwe and with its hub at Kamuzu International Airport. It was established in 2012 after the liquidation of Air Malawi, the former national airline. Ethiopian Airlines operates it under a management contract and owns 49 percent of the airline after it emerged as the winner following competitive bidding.

On 25 March 2021, the Board of Directors of the company passed a resolution recommending the "orderly winding up of the company" due to heavy debts and technical insolvency. However, on 5 May 2021 the Government of Malawi confirmed that it intended to recapitalise the airline instead. In 2022, the airline announced its first annual profit of MWK 4 billion (USD 4.0 million).

== History ==
The airline was formed in July 2013, following the collapse of Air Malawi, the hitherto national carrier, in February 2013, as a result of the inability to pay its debts. A deal with Ethiopian Airlines, that would see this carrier having a 49 percent shareholding in Air Malawi, was finalised in July 2013; the agreement also contemplated the renaming of Air Malawi to Malawian Airlines Ltd.

Operations commenced on 31 January 2014 serving the Blantyre–Lilongwe domestic route using 67-seater Bombardier Q400 aircraft. Malawian launched its first international service to Harare on 3 February 2014. Johannesburg was added to the route network two weeks later, on 17 February, and Dar es Salaam was incorporated on 18 February.

== Corporate affairs ==
=== Ownership ===
The airline is owned by the Government of Malawi (51 percent) and Ethiopian Airlines (49 percent). The government planned to offload 31% of its stake to private investors after a minimum period of 12 months after operations commence and it expected to earn US$6 million from this sale. In March 2016 Jimmy Lipunga, CEO of The Public Private Partnership Commission (PPPC), said that plans by the Malawi government to sell some shares in the airline to members of the public would depend on the airline attaining profitability.

=== Business trends ===
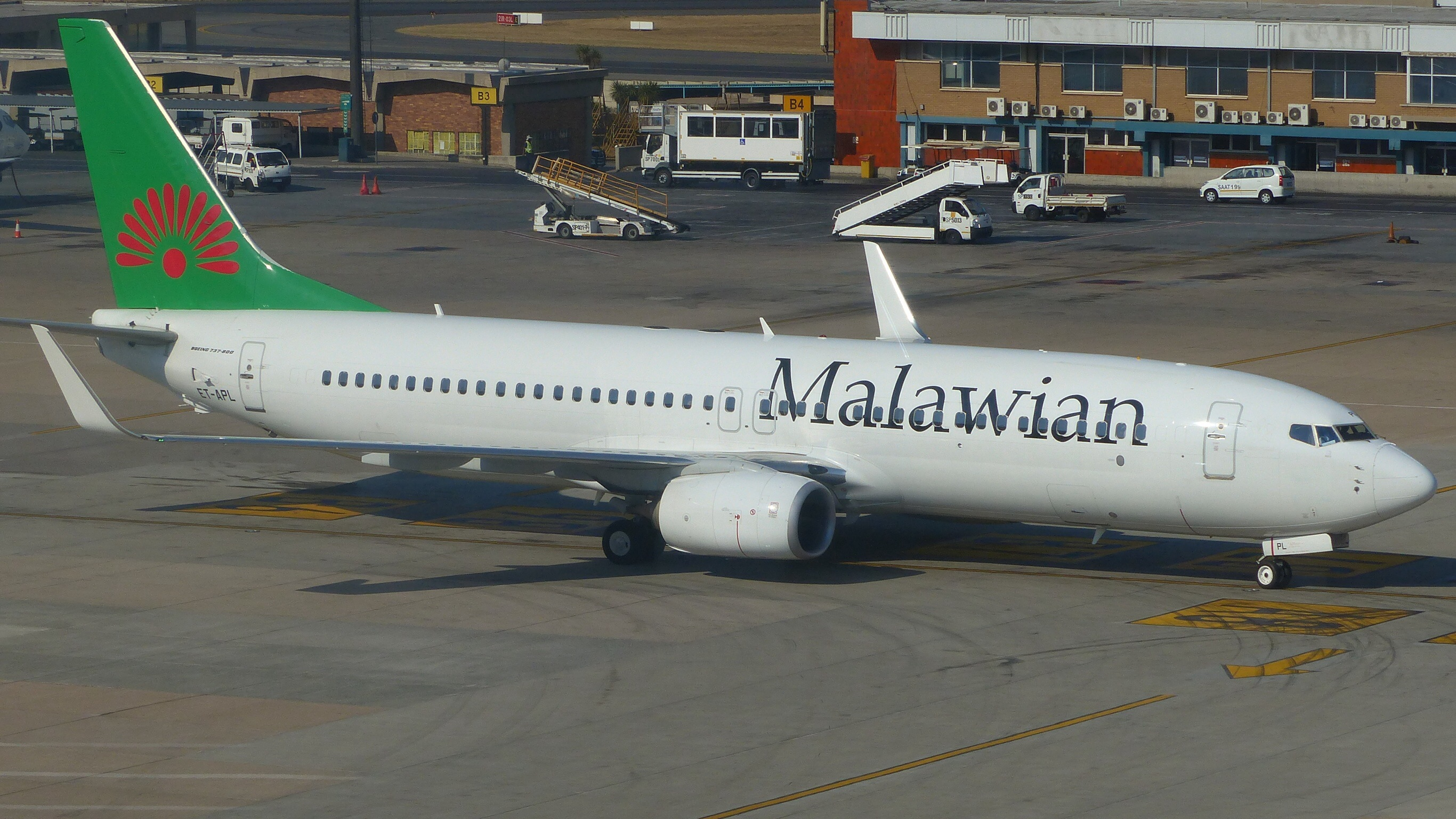
The Malawi Airlines Boeing 737-800 in 2014

Malawi Airlines was not profitable from its launch in 2014 until it reported a profit for 2021. Few financial and other trends have been made available by either of the main shareholders (years ending 31 December):

| | 2014 | 2015 | 2016 | 2017 | 2018 | 2019 | 2020 | 2021 |
|---|---|---|---|---|---|---|---|---|
| Turnover (MWKb) | | | | | | | | |
| Net profit (MWKb) | loss | loss | loss | loss | loss | loss | loss | 4.0 |
| Number of employees (at year end) | | | | | | | | |
| Number of passengers (m) | | | | | | | | |
| Passenger load factor (%) | | | | | | | | |
| Number of aircraft (at year end) | 2 | 2 | 2 | 2 | 2 | 3 | 1 | 2 |
| Notes/sources | | | | | | | | |

As of April 2021, the company has incurred cumulative losses of MWK 14.09 billion (USD 17.86 million) and has accumulated debts of MWK 13.83 billion (USD 17.54 million). However, in June 2022, the airline announced that it had recorded its first profitable year with profits of MWK 4 billion (USD 4 million) in 2021.

=== Head office ===
The airline's head office is located within the Golden Peacock Shopping Complex in Lilongwe.

== Destinations ==
Malawi Airlines serves the following destinations, as of November 2025:

| Country | City | Airport | Start | End | Refs |
|---|---|---|---|---|---|
| Kenya | Nairobi | Jomo Kenyatta International Airport | 29 March 2017 | —N/a | |
| Malawi | Blantyre | Chileka International Airport | 31 January 2014 | —N/a | |
| Malawi | Lilongwe | Kamuzu International Airport ^{Hub} | —N/a | —N/a | |
| South Africa | Johannesburg | O. R. Tambo International Airport | 17 February 2014 | —N/a | |
| Tanzania | Dar es Salaam | Julius Nyerere International Airport | 18 February 2014 | —N/a | |
| Uganda | Entebbe | Entebbe International Airport | 15 December 2025 | —N/a | |
| Zambia | Lusaka | Kenneth Kaunda International Airport | 17 February 2014 | —N/a | |
| Zimbabwe | Harare | Harare International Airport | 3 February 2014 | —N/a | |

The airline plans to add daily flights and expand new regional network routes to Pemba and Nampula in Mozambique, Kigali in Rwanda, as well as Entebbe in Uganda. It also plans to add another evening flight to Johannesburg, South Africa.

== Fleet ==
=== Current fleet ===
As of July 2026, Malawi Airlines operates the following aircraft:

Malawi Airlines fleet
| Aircraft | In service | Orders | Passengers | | | Notes |
| Aircraft | In service | Orders | C | E | Total | Notes |
|---|---|---|---|---|---|---|
| Boeing 737-800 | 1 | – | 16 | 150 | 166 | |
| Boeing 737-700 | 1 | – | 16 | 102 | 118 | |
| De Havilland Canada DHC-8-Q400 | 1 | – | | | | |
| Total | 3 | - | | | | |

=== Former fleet ===
As of August 2025, Malawi Airlines operated 1 Boeing 737-700, 1 Boeing 737-800 and 1 De Havilland Canada DHC-8-Q400.

== See also ==
- Airlines of Africa
- Air Malawi
- Transport in Malawi
