= Ntchisi Airport =

- IATA: none; ICAO: FWCS

Summary
- Airport type: Public
- Serves: Ntchisi
- Elevation AMSL: 4,300 ft / 1,311 m
- Coordinates: 13°22′35″S 33°51′55″E

Map
- Location of the airport in Malawi

Runways
Direction	Length		Surface
Direction	m	ft	Surface
14/32	1,036	3,399	Dirt
- Sources: GCM Google Maps

Ntchisi Airport (ICAO: FWCS) is an airport serving the town of Ntchisi, Republic of Malawi. The airport is 6 kilometres (3.7 mi) west of Ntchisi.

== See also ==
- Transport in Malawi
- List of airports in Malawi
