= Salima Airport =

- IATA: LMB; ICAO: FWSM

Summary
- Airport type: Public
- Serves: Salima
- Elevation AMSL: 1,688 ft / 515 m
- Coordinates: 13°45′25″S 34°35′05″E

Map
- Location of the airport in Malawi

Runways
| Direction | Length | | Surface |
| Direction | m | ft | Surface |
|---|---|---|---|
| 16/34 | 1,500 | 4,921 | Grass |
- Sources: Google Maps GCM

Salima Airport (IATA: LMB, ICAO: FWSM) is an airport serving the town of Salima, Republic of Malawi.

== See also ==
- Transport in Malawi
- List of airports in Malawi
