= Mambwe District =

Coordinates: 13°21′S 31°56′E

Mambwe District Malambo
- District
- Nickname: Mfuwe
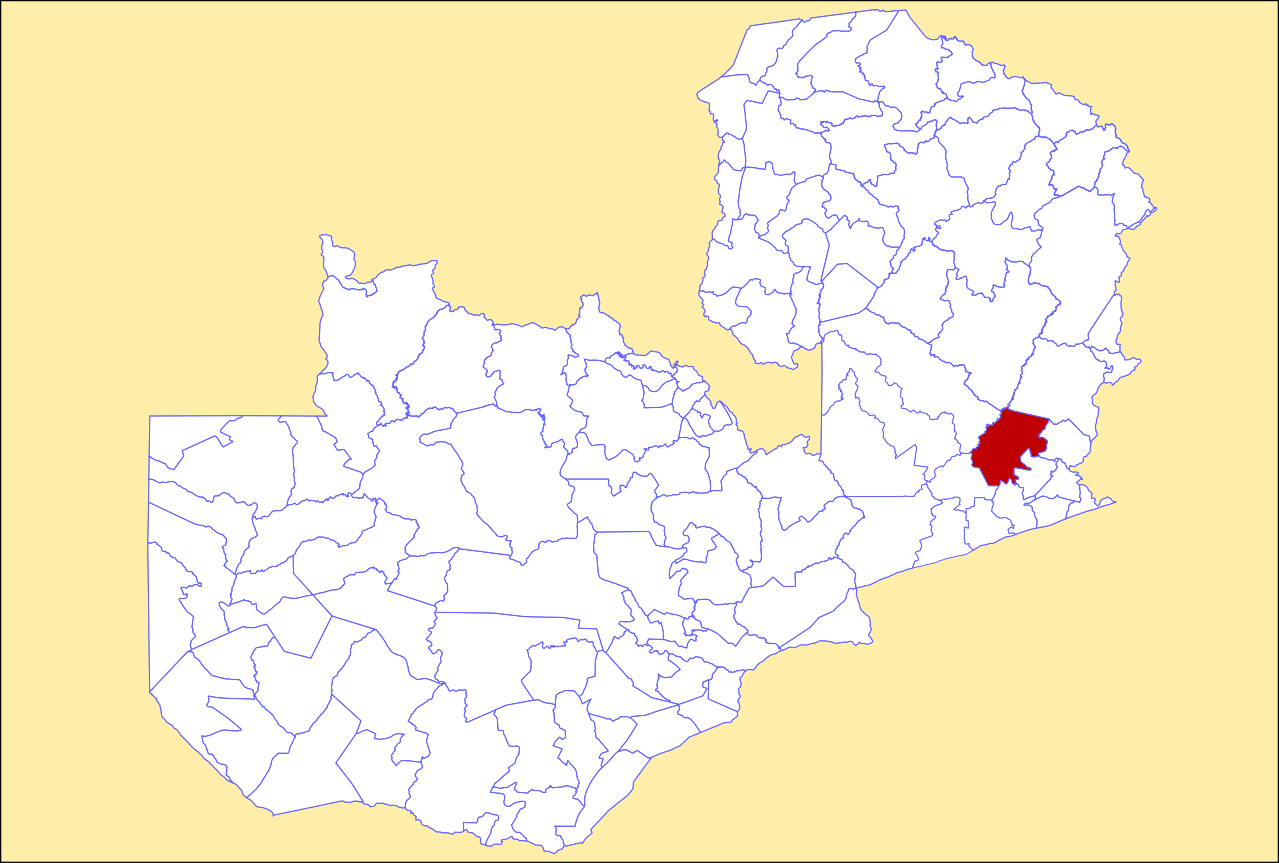
- District location in Zambia
- Country: Zambia
- Province: Eastern Province
- Capital: Mambwe

Area
  - Total: 5,725 km^{2} (2,210 sq mi)

Population (2022)
  - Total: 119,313
  - Density: 20.84/km^{2} (53.98/sq mi)
- Time zone: UTC+2 (CAT)

Mambwe District is a district of Zambia, located in Eastern Province. Mambwe District inhabits the Luangwa Valley between the 13th and 14th parallel of south latitude. The Kunda name for this area is "Malambo".

The land is bound on the west by the Luangwa River, on the south by the Lusangazi River, and on the north by the Chisitu River. It is approximately 700km east of Zambia’s capital city, Lusaka.

The capital lies at Mambwe named after the leader of the Kunda people during their migration from the Congo.

The district contains the South Luangwa National Park. The district has one parliamentary constituency called Malambo Constituency. It is further divided into 15 wards namely: Chikowa, Chipako, Chipapa, Chisengu, Jumbe, Kakumbi, Kasamanda, Malama, Mdima, Mnkhanya, Mphomwa, Msoro, Ncheka, Nsefu and Nyakatokoli.
