= Chelinda Airport =

Airport in Malawi

- IATA: CEH; ICAO: FWCD

Summary
- Airport type: Public
- Serves: Chelinda, Malawi
- Elevation AMSL: 7,759 ft / 2,365 m
- Coordinates: 10°33′25″S 33°47′55″E

Map
- Location of the airport in Malawi

Runways
Direction	Length		Surface
Direction	m	ft	Surface
08/26	1,280	4,199	Grass
- Sources: GCM Google Maps

Chelinda Airport (IATA: CEH, ICAO: FWCD) is an airport serving Chelinda, a village in the Northern Region of Malawi.

The Karonga VOR-DME (Ident: VKA) is 36.1 nautical miles (66.9 km) north of the airport.

== See also ==
- Transport in Malawi
- List of airports in Malawi
