= Mfuwe =

Tourist town in Eastern Province, Zambia

- Town
- Location in Zambia
- Coordinates: 13°6′38″S 31°47′52″E
- Country: Zambia
- Province: Eastern Province
- District: Mambwe District
- Time zone: UTC+2 (CAT)
- Climate: Aw

Mfuwe is the main settlement of South Luangwa National Park in the Eastern Province of Zambia, serving the tourism industry and wildlife conservation in the Luangwa Valley. It is located in Mambwe District, about 100 km (62 mi) west-north-west of Chipata.

Mfuwe has an airport with a 2.15 km (1.34 mi) surfaced runway capable of taking regional domestic and international flights.

This village holds the record of the highest temperature ever recorded in Zambia with 42.8 °C (109.0 °F) set on 26 October 2011.

In 1991, the village was plagued by a large, maneless, man-eating lion later known as the Man-Eater of Mfuwe, who claimed six people before being shot and killed.

== Climate ==
Mfuwe has a relatively dry tropical savanna climate (Köppen: Aw) with warm to hot temperatures and distinct wet and dry seasons. October and November are the hottest months, while June and July are the coolest months, featuring cool nights. The wet season, from November to March, experiences significant rainfall. The dry season, from May to October, has little precipitation.

Climate data for Mfuwe (1991–2020)
Month	Jan	Feb	Mar	Apr	May	Jun	Jul	Aug	Sep	Oct	Nov	Dec	Year
Record high °C (°F)	40.0 (104.0)	38.7 (101.7)	37.7 (99.9)	38.4 (101.1)	39.6 (103.3)	36.5 (97.7)	35.0 (95.0)	39.2 (102.6)	41.9 (107.4)	42.9 (109.2)	44.1 (111.4)	41.3 (106.3)	39.6 (103.3)
Mean daily maximum °C (°F)	31.9 (89.4)	32.2 (90.0)	32.5 (90.5)	32.5 (90.5)	32.1 (89.8)	30.6 (87.1)	30.2 (86.4)	32.7 (90.9)	36.0 (96.8)	37.9 (100.2)	37.4 (99.3)	33.6 (92.5)	33.3 (91.9)
Daily mean °C (°F)	26.4 (79.5)	26.5 (79.7)	26.4 (79.5)	25.4 (77.7)	23.3 (73.9)	21.1 (70.0)	20.7 (69.3)	22.9 (73.2)	26.4 (79.5)	28.9 (84.0)	29.6 (85.3)	27.5 (81.5)	25.4 (77.7)
Mean daily minimum °C (°F)	20.9 (69.6)	20.8 (69.4)	20.3 (68.5)	18.2 (64.8)	14.5 (58.1)	11.5 (52.7)	11.1 (52.0)	13.0 (55.4)	16.7 (62.1)	19.8 (67.6)	21.7 (71.1)	21.3 (70.3)	17.5 (63.5)
Record low °C (°F)	15.9 (60.6)	11.0 (51.8)	13.9 (57.0)	10.4 (50.7)	5.2 (41.4)	2.5 (36.5)	4.5 (40.1)	5.5 (41.9)	8.5 (47.3)	12.3 (54.1)	11.9 (53.4)	11.1 (52.0)	9.4 (48.9)
Average precipitation mm (inches)	219.0 (8.62)	169.2 (6.66)	121.6 (4.79)	30.7 (1.21)	4.0 (0.16)	0.0 (0.0)	0.1 (0.00)	0.1 (0.00)	0.4 (0.02)	9.9 (0.39)	77.1 (3.04)	172.3 (6.78)	804.4 (31.67)
Source: NOAA

== See also ==
- Mfuwe Airport
- South Luangwa National Park
- Luangwa River
