= Zomba Airport =

Airport in Zomba, Malawi

- IATA: none; ICAO: FWZA

Summary
- Airport type: Military/Public
- Location: Zomba
- Elevation AMSL: 2,650 ft / 808 m
- Coordinates: 15°23′10″S 35°23′05″E

Map
- Location of the airport in Malawi

Runways
Direction	Length		Surface
Direction	ft	m	Surface
09/27		1,250	Asphalt
- World Aero Data GCM Google Maps

Zomba Airport (ICAO: FWZA) is an airport serving Zomba, Malawi.

== See also ==
- Transport in Malawi
- List of airports in Malawi
