= South Luangwa National Park =

National park in Zambia

- IUCN category II (national park)
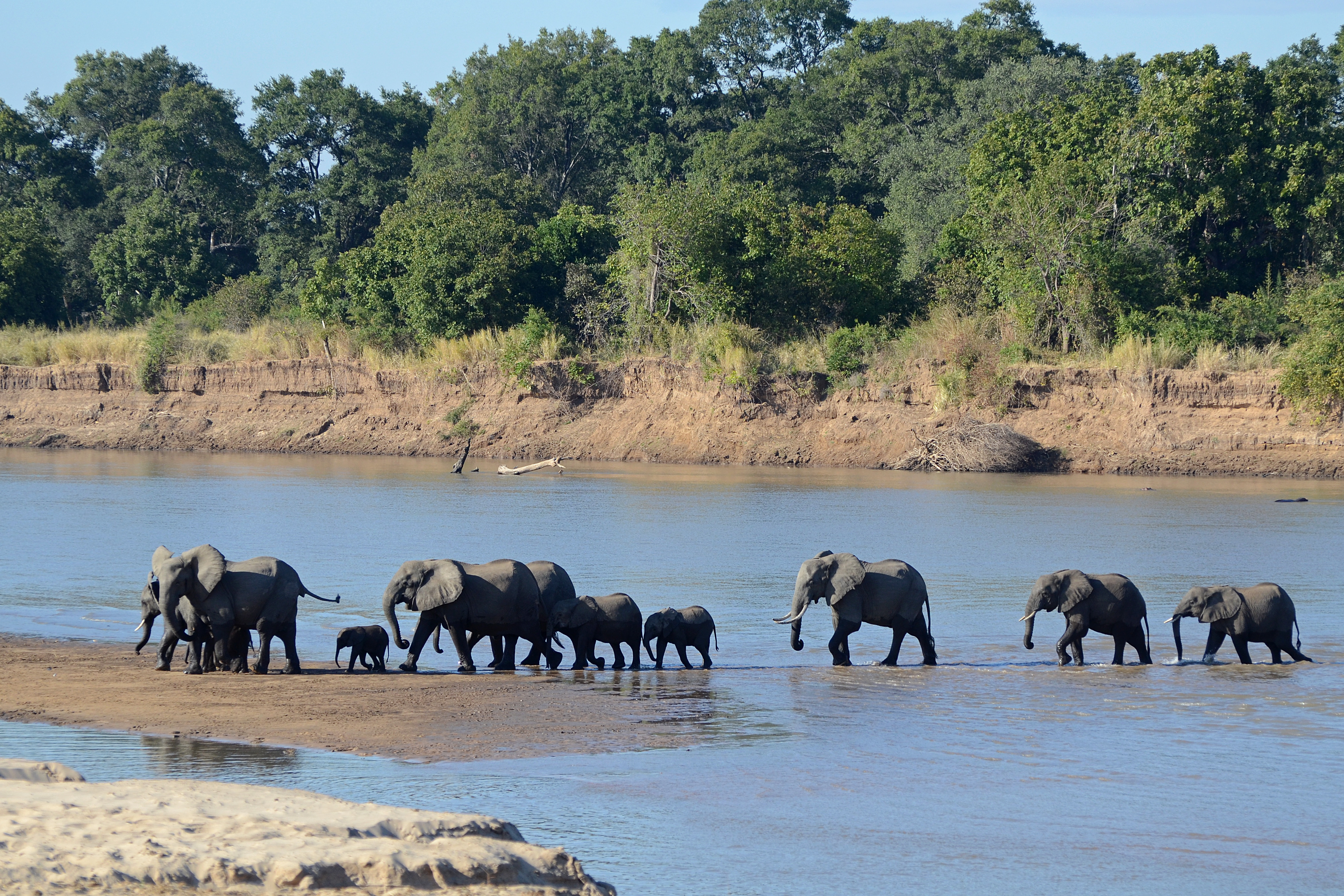
- Elephants crossing the Luangwa River

- Location within Zambia
- Location: Zambia
- Nearest city: Mfuwe, Zambia
- Coordinates: 13°0′S 31°30′E
- Area: 9,050 km^{2} (3,490 sq mi)
- Established: 1972
- Governing body: Zambia Wildlife Authority

South Luangwa National Park is a national park in eastern Zambia that was founded as a game reserve in 1938 and became a national park in 1972. It covers 9,050 km^{2} (3,490 sq mi) in the valley of the Luangwa River, which forms its eastern boundary in the Eastern Province of Zambia. It is bordered to the west by a steep escarpment, the Muchinga Escarpment in Muchinga and Central Provinces. The Luangwa Valley lies at the end of the East African Rift valley. The meandering Luangwa River and its lagoons support over 400 bird species and more than 60 mammal species including Rhodesian giraffe, African bush elephant and African buffalo.

== History ==
South Luangwa National Park was initially created as Luangwa Game Reserve in 1904. British conservationist Norman Carr was influential in setting up the South Luangwa National Park. A man ahead of his time, Norman Carr broke the mould of track-and-hunt safari and created conservation based tourism. In the 1950s, a portion of tribal land was set aside as a game reserve, and the first game viewing camp opened to the public in Northern Rhodesia. Guests shot with cameras and not rifles; thus the South Luangwa became the home of the photographic and walking safari. Profits from this remote photographic camp in the bush went back into community.

== Background ==
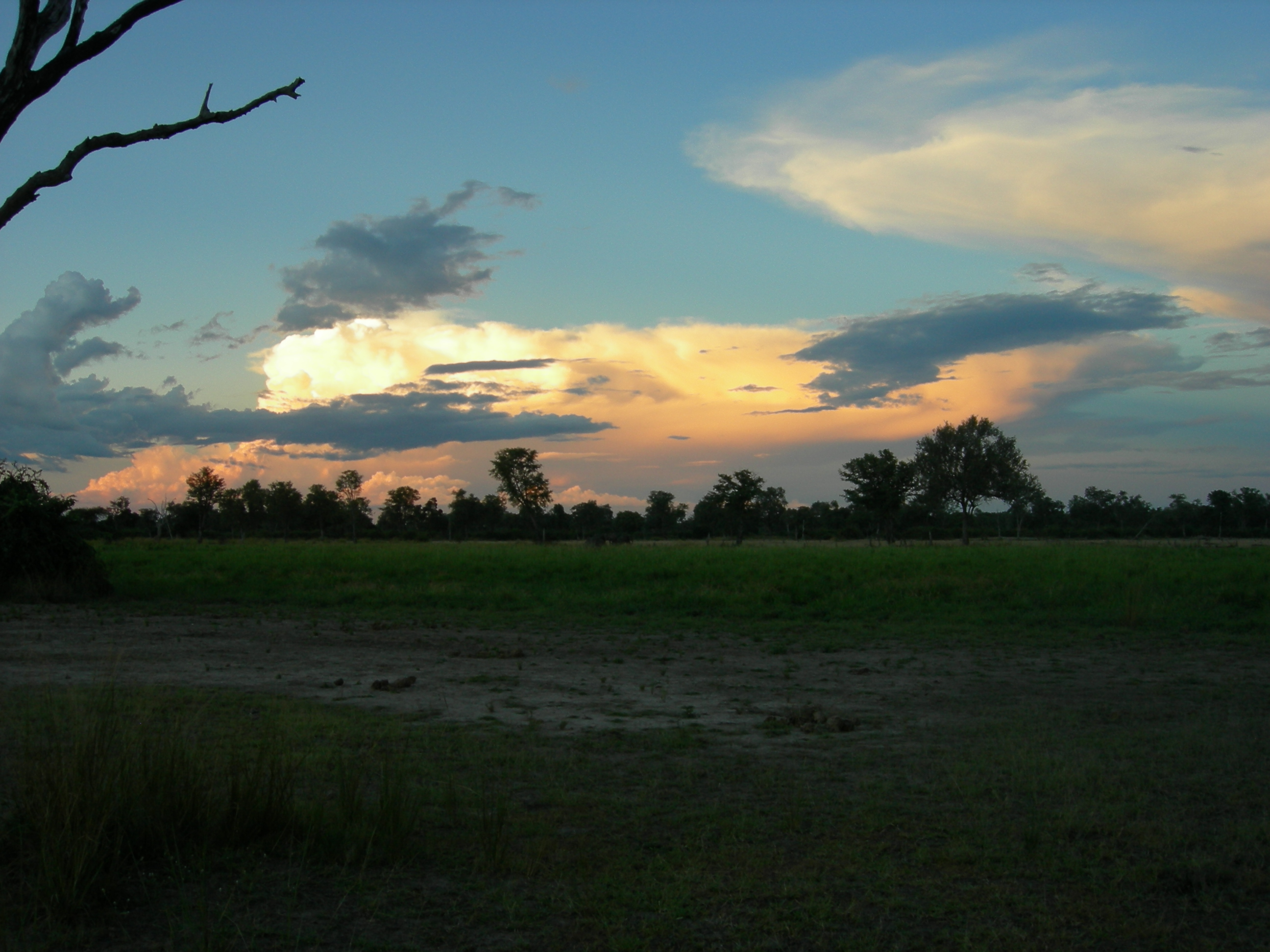
Sunset in the national park

The park spans two eco-regions, both of them woodland savannah, distinguished by the dominant tree: Southern Miombo woodlands cover the higher slopes of the valley, while Zambezian and Mopane woodlands cover the bottom of the valley. The Mopane tree tolerates the higher temperatures and lower rainfall found at lower elevations than miombo trees which are found on the higher plateau. Within these woodland savannahs are larger patches of grassland, so that grazers such as zebra and leaf browsers such as giraffe are found in profusion in the same areas. Patches of flooded grassland habitats (floodplains) are found close to the river, on which hippopotamus graze at night. Their dung released into the river fertilises its waters and sustains the fish population which in turn sustains the crocodiles.

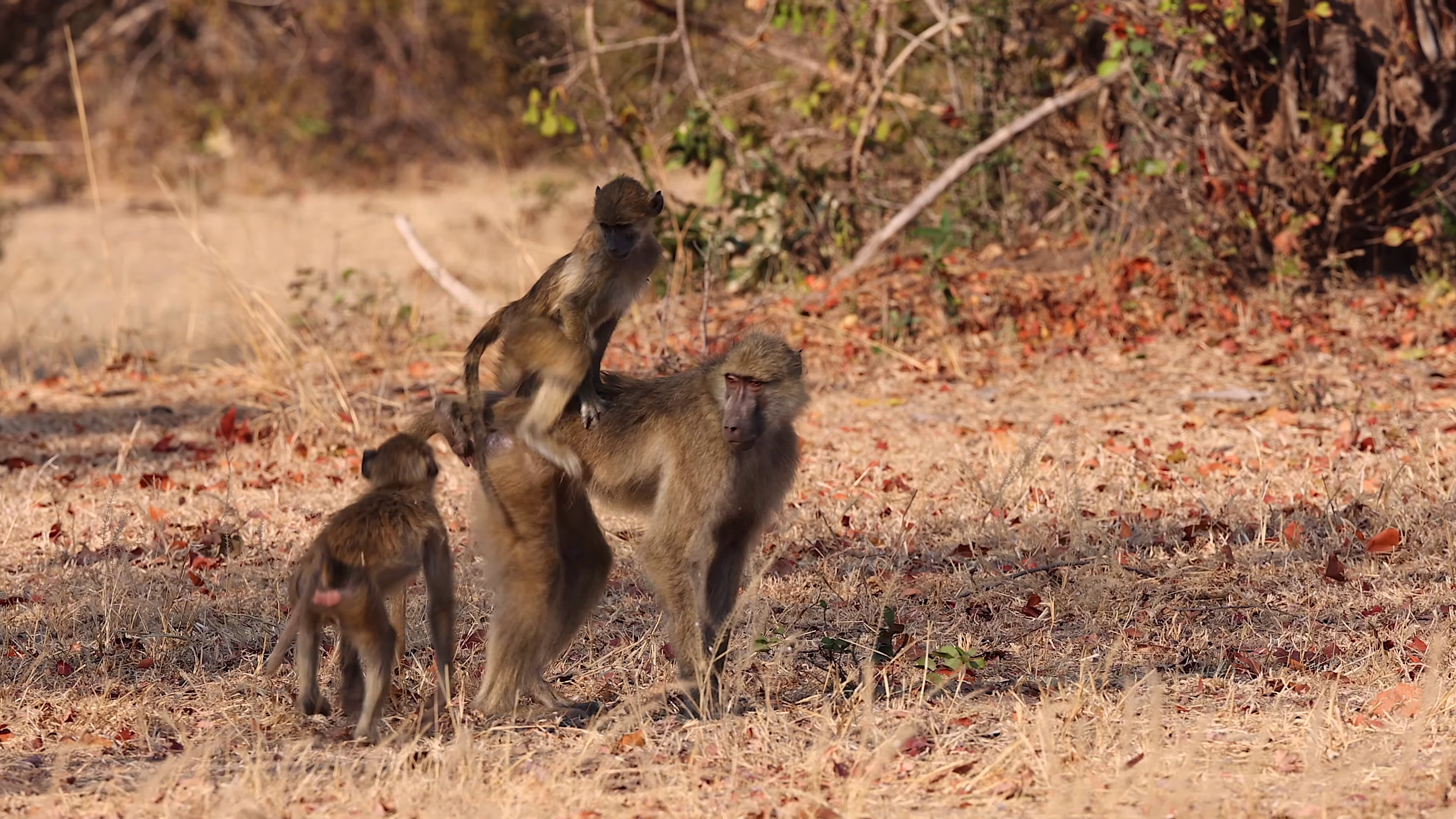
Monkey in the national park

The Luangwa valley, continued to the west by the Lunsemfwa River valley, contains some varieties of animals such as Cookson's wildebeest and Crawshay's zebra which are endemic or near-endemic to the valley. It also represents something of a natural barrier to human migration and transport, no roads cross it and this has helped conserve its wildlife.

== Nsefu Sector ==
The Nsefu Sector forms the northern part of South Luangwa National Park and is one of the earliest formally designated wildlife areas in the Luangwa Valley. The sector contains a diverse mosaic of habitats, including mature riverine forest, ebony (Diospyros mespiliformis) groves, mopane woodland, seasonally inundated floodplains and several natural geothermal springs. Ecological surveys have noted that this region supports some of the highest recorded densities of leopards in southern Africa, alongside stable populations of lions, spotted hyenas and African wild dogs. Traditional custodianship within the Mwanya Chiefdom continues to influence land use and conservation in the area, forming a long-standing model of community engagement and wildlife protection.

Although this park is generally well-protected from poaching, its black rhinos were extirpated by 1987, and the elephant population has been under serious pressure at times.

The main settlement of the park is actually outside its eastern boundary at Mfuwe, and it has an airport which has flights to Lusaka, the Lower Zambezi and Lilongwe in Malawi.

Since 2005, the protected area is considered a Lion Conservation Unit together with North Luangwa National Park.

== See also ==
- Wildlife of Zambia
