= Kamuzu International Airport =

Airport serving Lilongwe, Malawi

Kamuzu International Airport Lilongwe International Airport
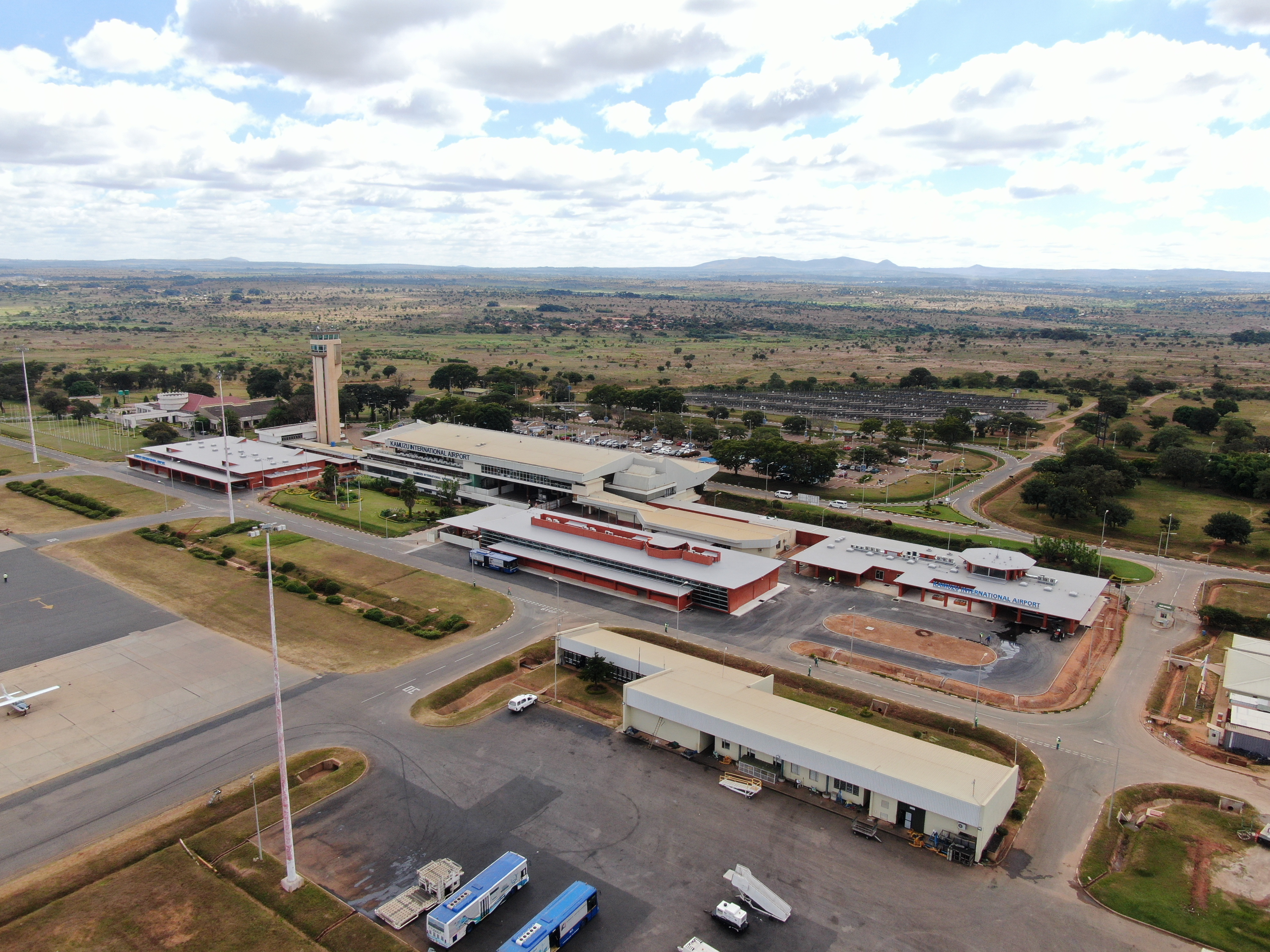
- IATA: LLW; ICAO: FWKI

Summary
- Airport type: Public
- Owner: Department of Civil Aviation
- Serves: Lilongwe, Malawi
- Hub for: Malawi Airlines
- Elevation AMSL: 4,035 ft (1,230 m)
- Coordinates: 13°47′21″S 033°46′51″E

Map
- Location in Malawi

Runways
Direction	Length		Surface
Direction	m	ft	Surface
14/32	3,540	11,614	Asphalt

Statistics (2009)
- Passengers: 296,190
- Source: DAFIF

Kamuzu International Airport, also known as Lilongwe International Airport, is an international airport serving Lilongwe, the capital city of Malawi.

== History ==
Kamuzu International Airport was constructed in Lumbazi, a suburb of the capital, following the relocation of Malawi's capital to Lilongwe in 1975. The construction period was from October 1977 to September 1982 and was divided into three phases.

The project funding came from a development loan from the Government of Japan, the African Development Bank as well as loans from an international banking consortium led by Chase Manhattan Bank. The construction company Nello L. Teer Company, carried out the construction of the runway, taxiways, and apron. The passenger terminal building, control tower, navigation aids, and radar facilities were financed by Japan's ODA loan, with consulting provided by Scott Wilson Kirkpatrick & Partners, and the construction was executed by Mitsubishi Corporation.

Kamuzu International Airport officially opened in 1983.

As of 1997, British Airways and KLM operated flights between Lilongwe and Europe.

In August 2014, the Government of Malawi requested assistance from the Government of Japan to rehabilitate the passenger terminal buildings and install a more advanced air surveillance system, ADS-B at the airport. The rehabilitation project was scheduled to run for 33 months and included expansion of the International terminal, rehabilitation of the existing terminal building, and installation of security and aerial surveillance systems. The work was conducted by the Japanese International Cooperation Agency (JICA) and in April 2019 the new terminal buildings were handed over to the Government of Malawi.

== Facilities ==
The airport is at an elevation of 4,035 feet (1,230 m) above mean sea level. It has one runway designated 14/32 with an asphalt surface measuring 3,540 by 45 metres (11,614 ft × 148 ft).

== Airlines and destinations ==
=== Passenger ===
Airlines	Destinations
Airlink	Johannesburg–O.R. Tambo
Ethiopian Airlines	Addis Ababa
Kenya Airways	Nairobi–Jomo Kenyatta
Malawi Airlines	Blantyre, Dar es Salaam, Entebbe, Harare, Johannesburg–O.R. Tambo, Lusaka, Nairobi–Jomo Kenyatta
Proflight Zambia	Lusaka, Mfuwe
Ulendo Airlink	Likoma Island, Mfuwe, Monkey Bay

=== Cargo ===
Airlines	Destinations
Astral Aviation	Nairobi–Jomo Kenyatta
Emirates SkyCargo	Dubai–Al Maktoum, Nairobi–Jomo Kenyatta

== Accidents and incidents ==
Kamuzu International Airport has been the site of a small number of aviation related incidents since its opening.

=== 2023 ===
22 August
A Cessna 150 operating for Eastrise Aviation, a pilot training institute based at KIA, was conducting a training flight with two occupants outbound from KIA. Approximately 14 minutes after takeoff, the pilot contacted air traffic control and informed them that they were experiencing an emergency and requested clearance for immediate landing. Clearance was granted and the pilot attempted to glide towards the airport but crashed about 1.2 kilometers short of the runway. Both occupants escaped unharmed and there were no casualties. The subsequent investigation determined that the cause of the accident was engine failure. Eyewitnesses reported that the aircraft produced a thudding sound as it crashed and was covered in a cloud of dust. The aircraft suffered damage to its nose, wheels, propellers and wings but the cabin was intact.
