= Chileka International Airport =

Airport in Malawi

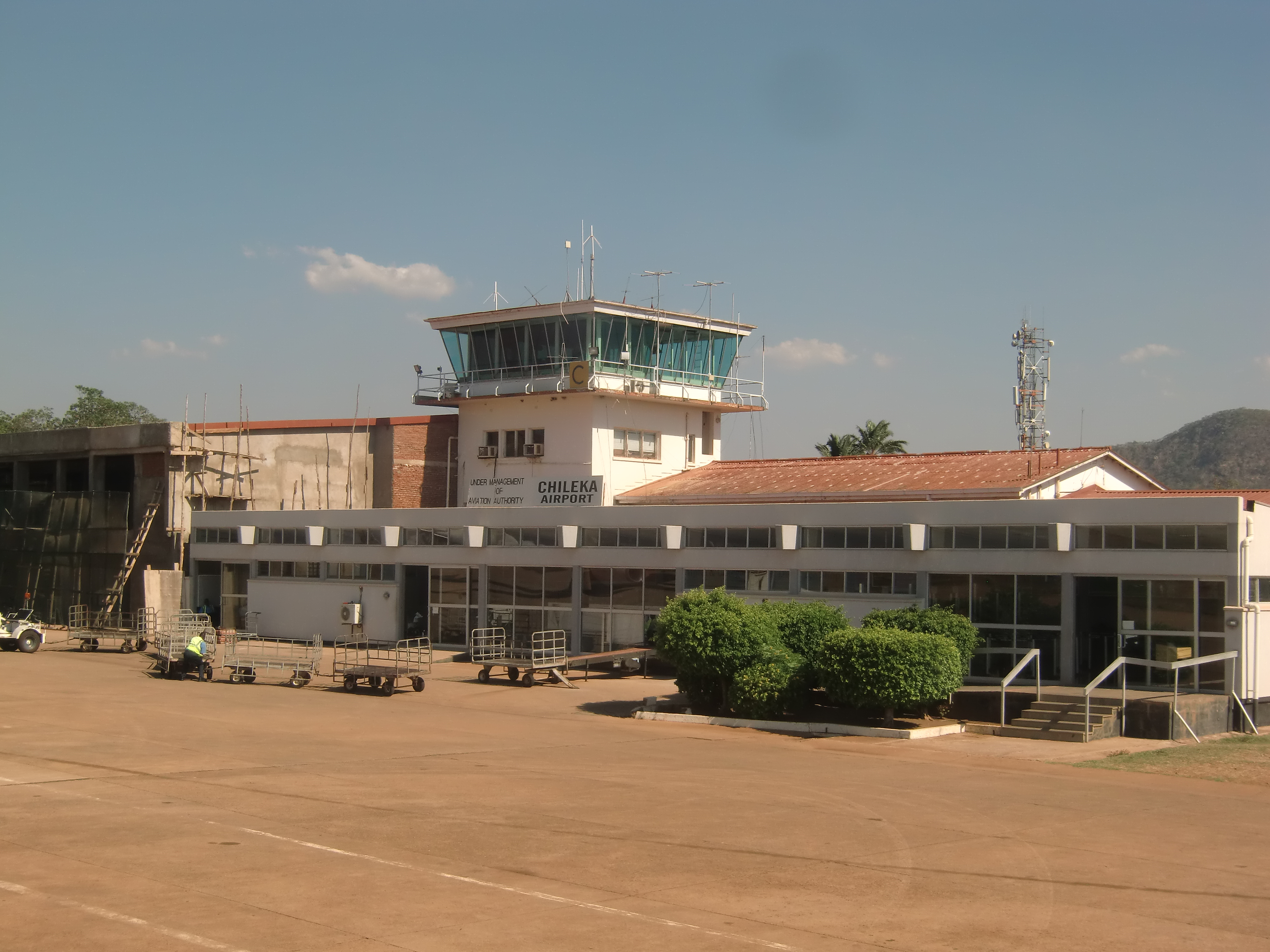
- The passenger terminal at Chileka
- IATA: BLZ; ICAO: FWCL

Summary
- Airport type: Public
- Owner: Government of Malawi
- Operator: Civil Aviation Authority of Malawi
- Serves: Blantyre, Malawi
- Location: Nyambala, Chileka
- Elevation AMSL: 2,555 ft / 779 m
- Coordinates: 15°40′52″S 34°58′18″E

Map
- Location within Malawi

Runways
Direction	Length		Surface
Direction	m	ft	Surface
10/28	2,325	7,628	Asphalt
15/33	1,372	4,501	Asphalt
- Source: DAFIF

Bakili Muluzi International Airport formerly Chileka International Airport (IATA: BLZ, ICAO: FWCL) is an international airport in Malawi. It is located approximately 13 km (7 nmi; 8 mi), by road, northwest of Blantyre, the second largest city in the Republic of Malawi and the country's commercial and financial capital. It is Malawi's second international airport, the other being Kamuzu International Airport, in Lilongwe, the nation's capital city.

== History ==
=== Construction ===
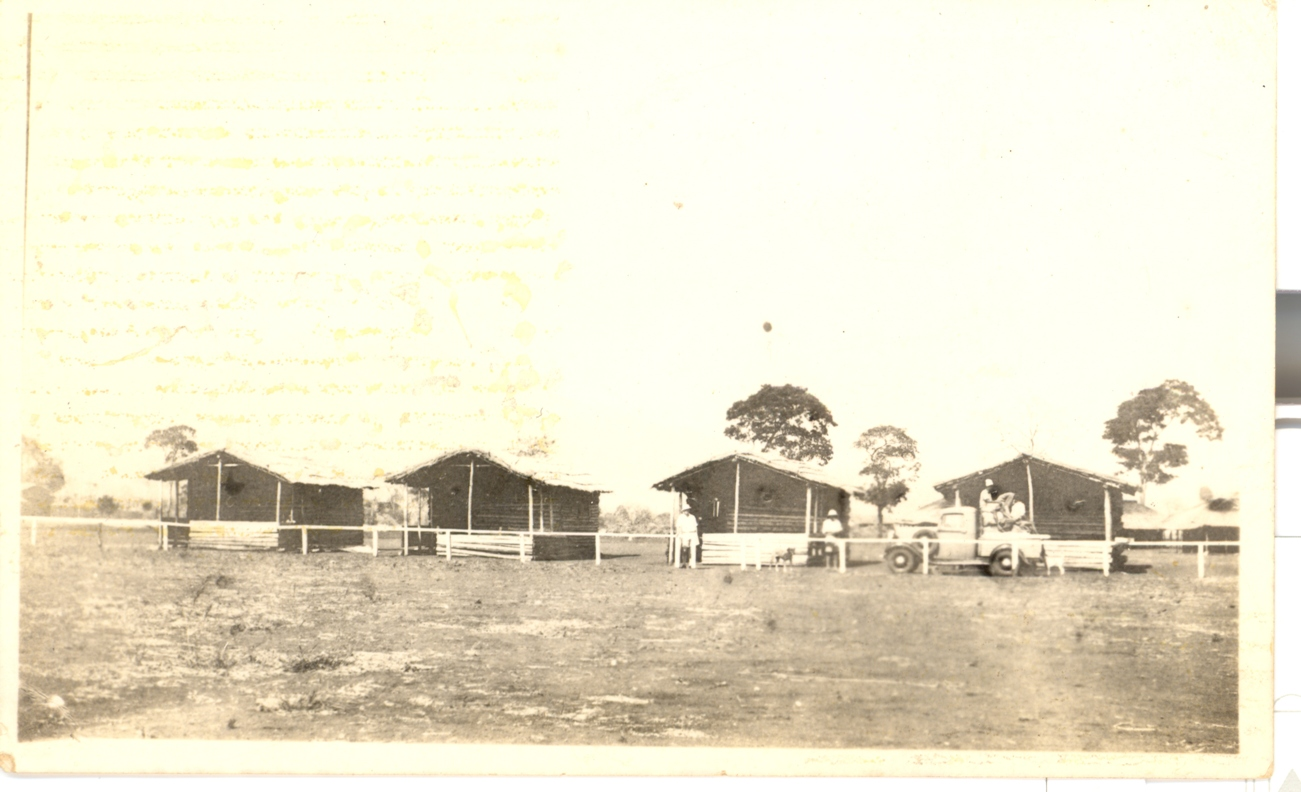
First buildings at Chileka Airport, taken 1935, 1936

The first buildings constructed at the site of Chileka airport were a small number of tin huts erected around 1934. Together with the small dirt landing strip, this infrastructure supported the Wenela service that transported Malawian men to work in mines in South Africa. Up until this time, other flights into Malawi were also conducted by flying boats, arriving on Lake Malawi, at Cape Maclear.

Around 1950 the British Colonial Service was commissioned by the British government to construct Chileka airport. Together with a Salisbury based construction firm, the development of the new airport began. The construction involved building a full-service facility that included a main terminal building with a lounge, restaurant, viewing balcony, and air traffic control tower. Supporting infrastructure was also built, including a fire station, hangars, staff housing, water towers, and electricity. Staff were also trained to take up the roles of air traffic controllers, ground stewards and other functions at the new airport. Central African Airways was the first company to operate flights out of the airport, running flights throughout the Federation of Rhodesia and Nyasaland.

The airport accommodated many different types of aircraft including Douglas C-47 Dakota, Vickers VC.1 Viking, de Havilland Dove, and de Havilland Canada DHC-2 Beaver. After some lengthening and reinforcement work was later carried out on the runway, the airport was then able to accommodate the first jet, the De Havilland Comet, and later the Vickers VC10.

Later on, the Mandala Building & Construction Co. built the VVIP lounge for the 1999 SADC conference that was held in Blantyre.

In August 2025 the President Lazarus Chakwera changed the name of the airport to Bakili Muluzi International Airport.

== Facilities ==
The airport's geographical coordinates are:15°40'52.0"S, 34°58'18.0"E (Latitude:-15.681111; Longitude:34.971667). The airport is at an elevation of 2,555 feet (779 m) above mean sea level.

The airport has two asphalt paved runways: 10/28 measures 2,325 by 30 metres (7,628 ft × 98 ft) and 15/33 measures 1,372 m × 30 m (4,501 ft × 98 ft).

== Renovations ==
In April 2019 scheduled renovations and extensions to the main runway were commenced, resulting in the temporary closure of runway 10/28. The renovations were initially scheduled to last for three months, with operations expected to resume in July 2019. However, several delays caused the project to take longer than anticipated, and the reopening date was pushed back at least three times.

The airport continued to be operational during this time, handling arrivals and departures of smaller aircraft on runway 15/33. During the closure, all arrivals and departures on medium range and larger aircraft operated from Kamuzu International Airport, with onward transfers to and from Chileka International Airport, on smaller aircraft.

The renovation works were finally completed in December 2019, and normal operations with both runways were resumed on 1 January 2020.

== Airlines and destinations ==
Airlines	Destinations
Airlink	Johannesburg–O. R. Tambo
Ethiopian Airlines	Addis Ababa
Malawi Airlines	Dar es Salaam, Johannesburg–O. R. Tambo, Lilongwe
