= Luangwa River =

River in Zambia

Coordinates: 15.57443°S 30.38887°E

Luangwa
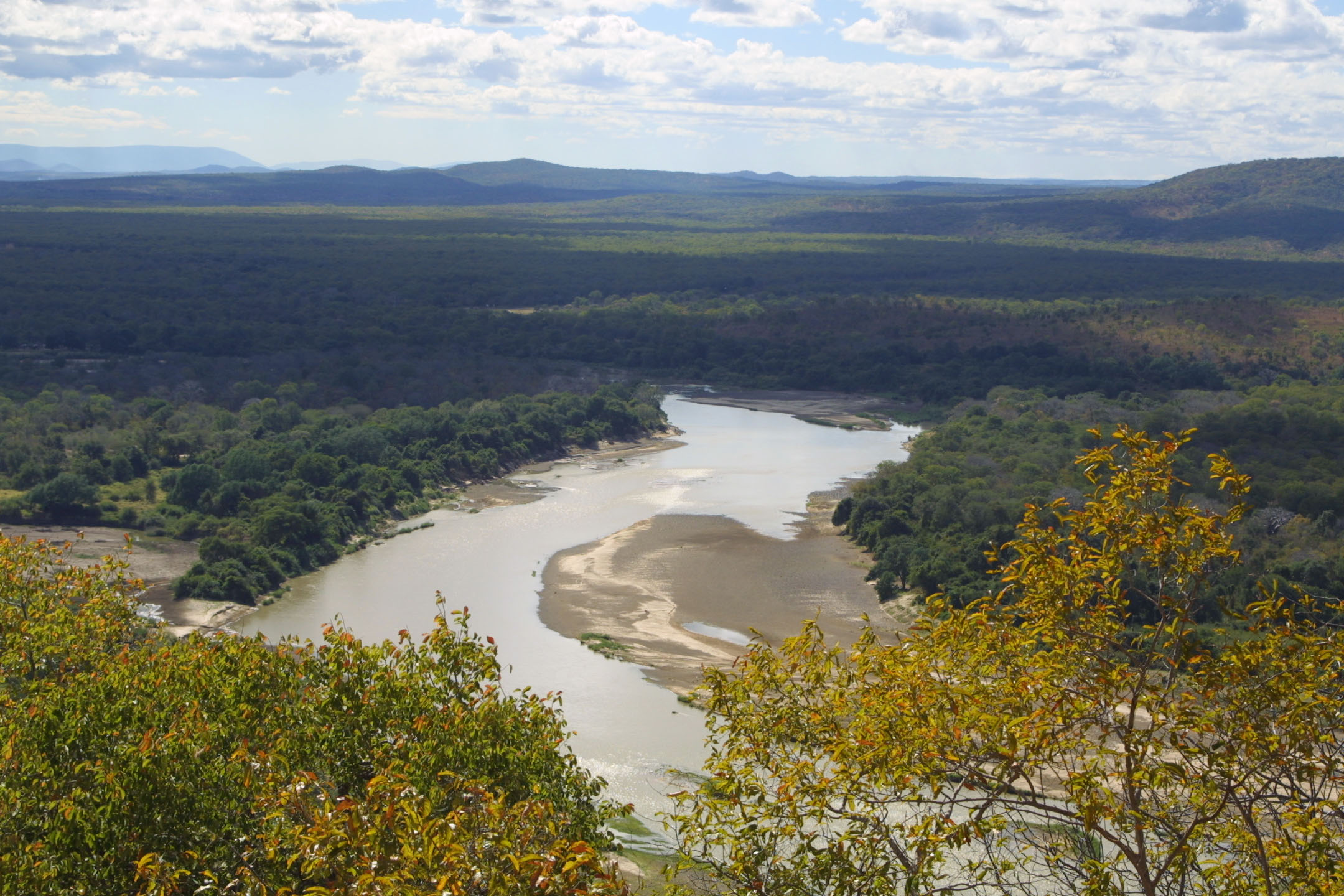
- Luangwa River, southern end near Ndevu

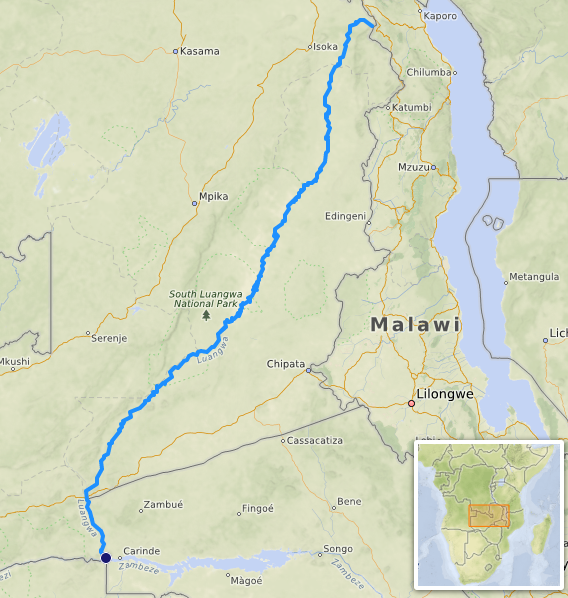
- Path of the Luangwa River

Location
- Country: Zambia
- Region: Eastern Province

Physical characteristics
- Mouth: Zambezi
  - location: near Luangwa, Zambia

Basin features
- River system: Zambezi

The Luangwa River is one of the major tributaries of the Zambezi River, and one of the four biggest rivers of Zambia. The river generally floods in the rainy season (December to March) and then falls considerably in the dry season. It is one of the biggest unaltered rivers in Southern Africa and the 52,000 square kilometres (20,000 sq mi) that make up the surrounding valley are home to abundant wildlife. The Nsefu sector in South Luangwa is known for its Leopard population and intact wilderness.

== Source and upper-middle course ==
Note: distances stated are approximate straight-line distances from source.

The Luangwa rises in the Lilonda and Mafinga Hills in north-east Zambia at an elevation of around 1,500 metres (4,900 ft), near the border with Tanzania and Malawi, and flows in a southwesterly direction through a broad valley. About 150 kilometres (93 mi) from its source it has dropped to an elevation of about 690 metres (2,260 ft) and becomes a meandering river with a floodplain several kilometres wide. Over the next 300 kilometres (190 mi) the meanders increase, with many oxbow lakes and abandoned meanders. Near Mfuwe, the river's elevation drops to about 520 metres (1,710 ft), the floodplain is about 10 kilometres (6.2 mi) wide and the valley reaches about 100 kilometres (62 mi) wide, with a north-west escarpment (Muchinga Escarpment) about 700 metres (2,300 ft) high, and a south-western escarpment about 450 metres (1,480 ft) high. In the dry season some sections, especially in the upper reaches, dry out completely, leaving isolated pools.

The upper and middle parts of the valley contain the North Luangwa National Park and South Luangwa National Parks of Zambia. The river itself is home to large populations of hippopotamuses and crocodiles. The world's largest concentration of hippos lives in the Luangwa Valley. In the dry season they are restricted by the shrinking river and pools, and are easily seen especially in isolated pools.

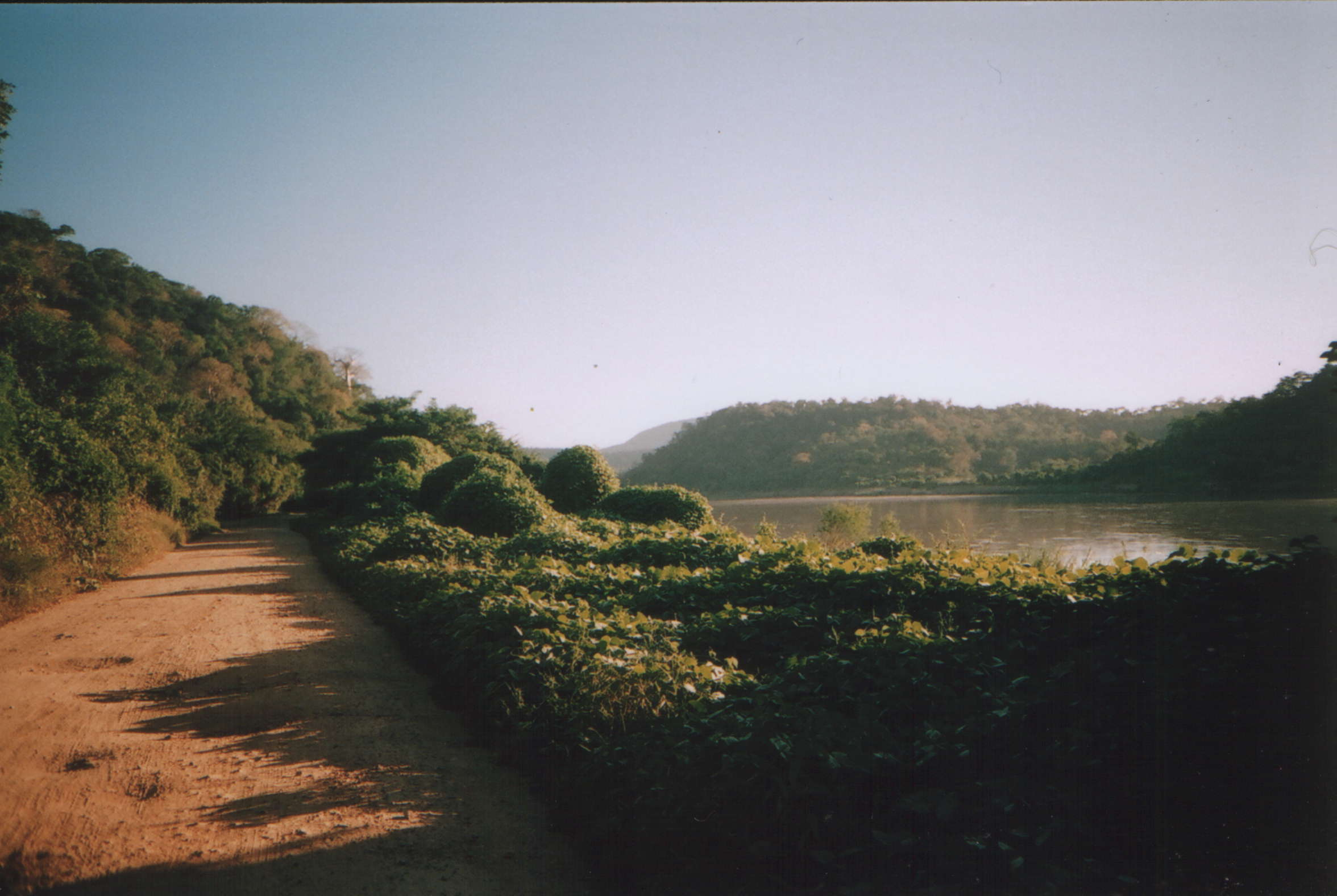
Luangwa River, 10 kilometres (6.2 mi) south of Luangwa Bridge

In addition to being a source of water, the oxbow lakes and pools increase the biodiversity of the valley in other ways. The hippopotami which live in them feed on land vegetation at night. Their dung feeds some fish and fertilises the pools, increasing fish life which in turn feed crocodiles and birds.

In the dry season, the grazing land animals and their predators congregate near the river and pools, and are easily seen. In the rainy season they graze further afield and are more easily hidden in the growth of new vegetation.

At about 500 kilometres (310 mi) the valley narrows to about 50 kilometres (31 mi) and becomes divided by a ridge into two parallel valleys, with a tributary, the Lukusashi River in a 25-kilometre (16 mi) wide valley to the northwest, and the Luangwa in a 15-kilometre (9.3 mi) wide valley to the southeast. The river meanders less, and the floodplain narrows.

The principal settlement in the Middle and Upper Luangwa Valley is Mfuwe which serves the tourism industry and has an international airport. Very few humans otherwise inhabit the valley.

== Lower course ==
At 600 kilometres (370 mi) the river abruptly enters a narrow valley between hills rising some 200 metres (660 ft) from the broader valley floor, becoming almost a gorge. About 700 kilometres (430 mi) from its source the Luangwa merges with its tributary, the Lukusashi, after the latter has merged with the Lunsemfwa River coming from the opposite direction, and turns due south through a steep narrow valley: this is its exit from the Luangwa Rift Valley. After only 20 kilometres (12 mi) it emerges from the hills into the broad valley of the Zambezi and meanders over sandy flats about 1.5 kilometres (0.93 mi) wide in a floodplain 3 to 5 kilometres (1.9 to 3.1 mi) in width. It merges with the deeper Zambezi at Luangwa town. The lower section of the river forms the border between Zambia and Mozambique.

== Rift valley ==
The Luangwa Valley is a rift valley or graben forming a south-west extension of the east African Rift, branching off its Lake Rukwa-Lake Malawi southern section, and reaching almost as far as Lusaka. The junction is not obvious because it filled with material spewed out from an ancient, extinct volcano. There are at least 20 hot springs, characteristic of a rift valley, in the valley or on its escarpments.

The Luangwa flows along four-fifths of the Luangwa Rift Valley to the point where it meets the Lukusashi and the Lunsemfwa which has come from the opposite direction. At one time, millions of years ago, there was no way out and the Luangwa Rift filled with a Rift Valley Lake called the Madumabisa Lake, which rivalled Lake Malawi in size. The water of the lake overflowed in a river to the south-west, towards what is now the Kalahari, where it combined with the Okavango, Upper Zambezi, Cuando and Kafue rivers, emptying into the Limpopo River and flowing to the Indian Ocean.

Several geological events combined to produce the current river systems. Faulting produced another graben just to the south of the Luangwa Rift, and running east–west: the Zambezi Rift Valley and the Chicoa Trough. A tributary of the Shire River at the south end of the Great Rift Valley then cut back eastwards through the Chicao Trough and Zambezi Valley, capturing the southerly overspill of the Madumabisa Lake. This tributary became the Zambezi, which over millions of years captured the Kafue, Cuando and the upper Zambezi. Faulting lowered the land between the Luangwa Rift and the Zambezi Rift allowing Madumabisa Lake to drain out into the Zambezi in a channel which became the lower Luangwa River.

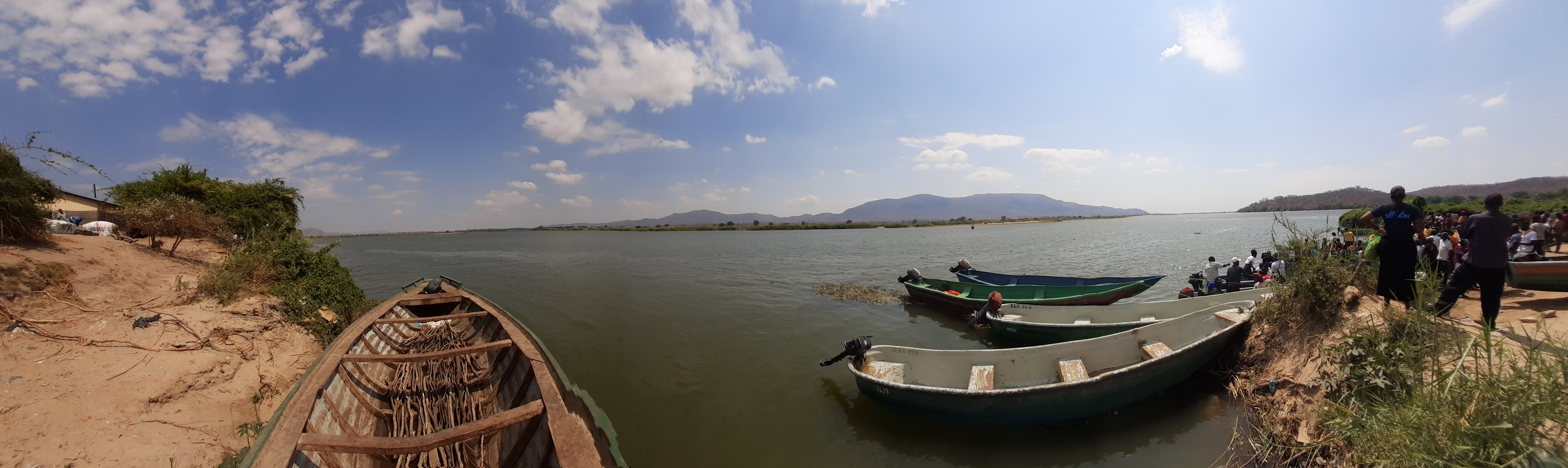
The Luangwa merges with Zambezi River.

== Natural barrier ==
The Luangwa Rift Valley and rivers within it form a natural barrier, with a very low population density. This, the steepness of the terrain, and the existence of the wildlife reserves have resulted in no highways crossing the valley between the Lusaka-Kabwe roads in the west and the Isoka-Chisenga road in the north, a distance of about 800 kilometres (500 mi). The lower Luangwa Valley is crossed by just one road, the Great East Road at the Luangwa Bridge, about 10 kilometres (6.2 mi) south of the Luangwa-Lunsemfwa confluence.
