= Transport in Zambia =

This article is about Transport in Zambia.

== Railway ==
There is a total of 2,157 km (2008) of railway track in Zambia.

=== Principal lines ===
- Zambia Railways Limited (ZRL) – 1,067 mm (3 ft 6 in) narrow gauge, 846 km Kitwe-Ndola-New Kapiri Mposhi-Kabwe-Lusaka-Livingstone-Zimbabwe with several freight branches mostly in the Copperbelt totalling 427 km including to DR Congo. Passenger services between Kitwe and Livingstone only.
- TAZARA Railway – 1,067 mm (3 ft 6 in) narrow gauge, 891 km in Zambia: New Kapiri Mposhi-Mpika-Kasama-Dar es Salaam

=== Notable Branch lines ===
- Maamba Colliery Railway, Choma to Masuka, built to carry coal.
- The Mulobezi Railway (also known as Zambezi Sawmills Railway) is a narrow gauge line constructed to carry timber from Mulobezi to Livingstone. Has been reported at various times as defunct, currently listed in Railtracker (see 'Railway Network Map' below) but operating status not confirmed.
- Mulungushi Commuter Line, later Njanji Commuter Line managed by ZRL, operated from 1991 to 1998 in Lusaka from the Chilenje-Libala to George townships (16 km); bids invited by the privatisiation board in September 2005 for re-opening it.

=== Railway links with adjacent countries ===
- (Democratic Republic of the Congo) DR Congo – yes, Ndola to Sakania then Lubumbashi – 1,067 mm (3 ft 6 in), freight only. (For extensions and reconstruction beyond Lubumbashi see the DR Congo article). The current operating status of Chililabombwe-DR Congo link not known.
- Tanzania – yes, from Kapiri Mposhi, border crossing at Nakonde, Zambia, to Dar es Salaam, TAZARA railway, passenger and freight – 1,067 mm (3 ft 6 in)
- Malawi – Chipata-Mchinji new link opened to traffic in 2010.
- Mozambique – no direct link, but indirectly to Beira and Maputo via Zimbabwe (no continuous passenger services).
- Zimbabwe – yes, from Livingstone via the Victoria Falls Bridge to Bulawayo, freight only.
- Botswana – no direct link, indirectly via Zimbabwe (no continuous passenger services).
- Namibia – no direct link.
- Angola – no direct link – but indirectly via DR Congo to Benguela on the Benguela Railway – same gauge 1,067 mm (3 ft 6 in), while the railway was inoperable for many years because of the Angolan Civil War, it has been recently reconstructed.

=== Proposed extensions ===
==== 2007 ====
on 25 August 2007.

- A branch line from Nseluka on the TAZARA Railway to Mpulungu on Lake Tanganyika has been proposed.
- A connection from the Chipata Railway when completed to the TAZARA line at Mpika has been mooted. This could be controversial as it would pass through or between the world-famous Luangwa Valley national parks. A more southerly route, linking Eastern Province towns such as Katete and Petauke and going to the TAZARA line at Serenje would by-pass the parks.

==== 2006 ====
Zambia's North-West Extension – 8 February 2006 – Preparatory work is going forward on Zambia's proposed new north-western extension railway from Chingola to Solwezi, estimated to cost about $US235m. The area has excellent mining potential which cannot be exploited effectively without rail facilities. The route has been surveyed and the implications of compensating land owners are being worked out.

Australian and American interests are examining the project and the Development Bank of Southern Africa (DBSA) may help with finance. The United States Trade and Development Agency (USTDA), another prospective source of funding, is also looking at the scheme. Hopes have been expressed that the new line might eventually be extended to Mwinilunga and even to join Angola's Benguela Railway without relying on the DR Congo link, to restore what was until the 1970s Zambia's main route for exporting copper and other metals. In April 2012, according to newspaper reports, the Zambian government "has issued a permit to North-West Railway Company (NWR) for construction of the 554 km railway line from Chingola to Jimbe on the Angolan border".

The Angolan transport ministry plans to build a line branching off the Benguela Railway at Luacano and entering Zambia from Macango, thus avoiding DR Congo territory. The establishment of this direct link was also subject of talks during the visit of an Angolan delegation to Lusaka in May 2012. "The Benguela Railway will improve relations between the two countries as well as transportation of goods. It is encouraging that the railway on the Angolan side will reach the border by next year," said Keith Mukata, Zambian Deputy Minister for Commerce, Trade, and Industry.

=== Stations ===
==== Principal towns served by rail ====
===== Existing =====
• Lusaka – capital	• Kabwe	• Ndola
• Kafue	• Kitwe	• Chililabombwe – freight only
• Mazabuka	• Kapiri Mposhi	• Luanshya – freight only
• Choma	• Mpika	• Chingola – freight only
• Livingstone	• Kasama	• Mufulira – freight only
• Mulobezi	Ndola

== Trade corridors ==
As a landlocked minerals producer, Trade Corridors are vital to Zambia. In Zambia's case these are road and/or rail routes which cross international borders to ports and which are the subject of international agreements on planning, use and management. They are not separate from the road and rail networks listed above, but are entities superimposed on those networks for strategic economic and trade development. They are:

1. Southern Corridor: to Durban Port via Johannesburg, South Africa via Zimbabwe (road or rail) or Botswana (road).
2. Maputo Corridor: As for (1) but rail or road from Johannesburg to Maputo Port, Mozambique.
3. Walvis Bay Corridor: Road via Livingstone/Sesheke/Katima Mulilo to Walvis Bay Port, Namibia.
4. Beira Corridor: Road to Harare or rail to Bulawayo, then rail via Mutare to Beira, Mozambique.
5. Nacala Corridor: road to Lilongwe then rail to Nacala, Mozambique.
6. Tazara Corridor: road or rail via Kapiri Mposhi to Dar es Salaam, Tanzania.
7. Lobito Corridor: rail via DR Congo to Lobito Bay, Angola (not currently operational, depends on Benguala Railway re-opening).

Corridors 1 to 6 may also be used by southeastern DR Congo though Zambia.

== Water transport ==
Although none of the major urban centres are located on usable waterways, Zambia is a relatively well-watered country but is mainly flat, meaning there are many navigable rivers, lakes and channels through swamps, which together reach a large proportion of the rural population. These offer a minimum-maintenance rural transport alternative. In the cases of Bangweulu and Mweru Wantipa in particular, there are permanent and seasonal fishing communities for whom the only access is by boat or canoe.

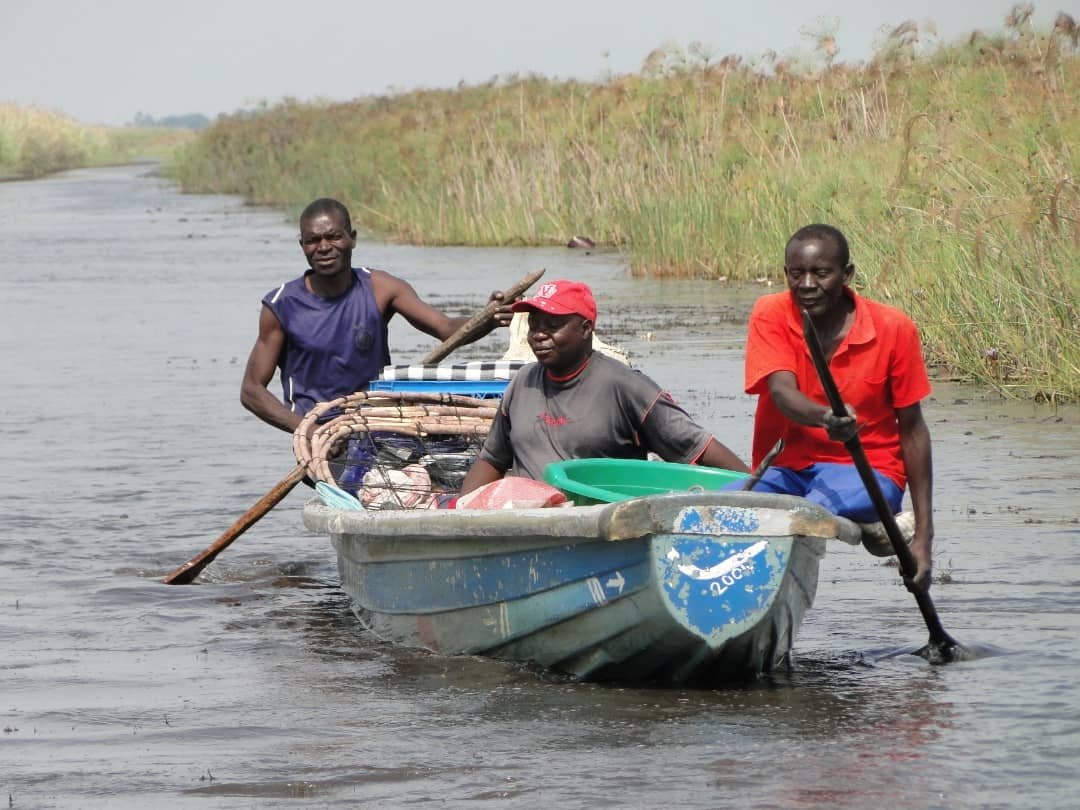
Men crossing the Zambezi river, Western Province of Zambia

=== Main systems ===
- 2,250 km of principal navigable rivers, including the upper Zambezi (Barotse Floodplain), Chambeshi, Kafue, Luapula; and the Luangwa, though not always in the dry season.
- other rivers navigable to canoes and small boats seasonally or in sections include the Dongwe/Kabompo and Lungwebungu in the west and Luena-Luongo and upper Kalungwishi in the north, and numerous others.
- Lake transport – principal navigable lakes (with main port or boating centre in brackets): Lake Tanganyika (Mpulungu), Lake Mweru (Nchelenge-Kashikishi), Lake Mweru Wantipa (Kaputa), Lake Bangweulu (Samfya), Lake Kariba (Siavonga).
- Navigable channels in swamps: the largest of these is the Bangweulu Swamps comprising hundreds of kilometres of channels over an area of up to 10,000 km^{2} depending on season. Others include the upper Zambezi/Barotse Floodplain especially at Mongu, the lower Luapula, the Mweru Marshes, Lukanga Swamp, and the Luena-Lufubu swamps at Mushota, Kawambwa district.

== Air transport ==
Zambia has four international airports, five airstrips and five secondary airfields that serve the domestic and international flights. The main airport is Lusaka Kenneth Kaunda International Airport. Other smaller airports include Livingstone and Mfuew, Ndola along with secondary airfields including Kasama, Kitwe, Chipata, Mongi, Mansa and Solwezi.

Zambia has an 'open skies' policy since the state-owned national carrier failed. Before its demise, Zambian Airways was the only Zambia-based scheduled carrier. As of 2022, there are several scheduled carriers based in Zambia: Zambia Airways, Proflight Zambia, Royal Zambian Airlines, and Mahogany Air.

Only six of Zambia's airports see scheduled commercial flights: Chipata Airport, Harry Mwanga Nkumbula International Airport, Kenneth Kaunda International Airport, Mfuwe Airport, Simon Mwansa Kapwepwe International Airport, and Solwezi Airport. Zambia's three international airports offer passenger flights to Dar es Salaam, Johannesburg, Mbombela, Dubai, Harare, Addis Ababa, Nairobi, Lilongwe, Doha, Kigali, Gaborone, and Cape Town.

=== Airports – With Paved Runways ===
Total: 8
Over 3,047 m: 1
2,438 to 3,047 m: 3
1,524 to 2,437 m: 3
914 to 1,523 m: 1 (2012)

=== Airfields – with unpaved runways ===
Total: 80
2,438 to 3,047 m: 1
1,524 to 2,437 m: 5
914 to 1,523 m: 53
under 914 m: 21 (2012)

== See also ==
- Zambia railways
- TAZARA Railway
