= Zambia (disambiguation) =

Zambia is a country in Africa.

Zambia may also refer to:

== Sports ==
- Zambia national football team
- Zambia women's national football team
- Zambia men's national basketball team
- Zambia women's national basketball team
- Zâmbia (footballer), Brazilian former footballer João Marcos Ferreira Andrade (born 1985)
- Zambia Open, a men's golf tournament
- Zambia Ladies Open, a former golf tournament
- Zambia Masters, a men's golf tournament
- Zambia International, a badminton tournament held in Lusaka, Zambia

== Other uses ==
- Zambia Airways, the flag carrier of Zambia
- Zambia Railways, the national railway company of Zambia
- University of Zambia, Lusaka, Zambia

== See also ==
- Zamba (disambiguation)
- Zampa (disambiguation)
- Zambo (disambiguation)
- Zambar (disambiguation)
