= List of defunct airlines of Zambia =

This is a list of defunct airlines of Zambia.

Airline	Image	IATA	ICAO	Callsign	Founded	Ceased operations	Notes
Aero Zambia		Z9	RZL		1994	2000	
Airwaves Airlink			WLA	AIRLIMITED	2004	2006	Merged into Zambian Airways
Fastjet Zambia			FJB		2015	2016	A subsidiary of Fastjet Zimbabwe that never launched
Hunting Surveys Zambia					1967	1968	
Kudu Air					1995	1996	
Lupenga Air Charters			LUP		1991	2001	
Mines Air Service					1965	1998	Renamed to Roan Air
Mukuba Airlines					2014	2014	Planned to become Zambia’s first low-cost airline but never launched
National Air Charters				NAC	1990	1990	
Nationwide Airlines		4J	NWZ	ZAMNAT	2001	2002	
Roan Air					1998	1999	Rebranded as Zambian Airways
Zambezi Airlines		ZJ	ZMA	ZAMBEZI WINGS	2008	2012	
Zambia Airways		QZ	ZAC	ZAMBIA	1964	1995	Re-launched by Ethiopian Airlines in 2021
Zambian Airways		Q3	MBN	ZAMBIANA	1999	2009	
Zambian Express Airways		OQ	SZX		1995	1998	
Zambia Skyways		K8	ZAK	ZAMBIA SKIES	1999	2010	

== See also ==
- List of airlines of Zambia
- List of airports in Zambia
