= List of airlines of Zambia =

This is a list of airlines currently operating in Zambia (2020):

== Passenger airlines ==
=== Scheduled ===
Airline	Image	IATA	ICAO	Callsign	Hub airport(s)	Founded	Notes
Mahogany Air		KT			Kenneth Kaunda International Airport	2013	
Proflight Zambia		P0	PFZ	PROFLIGHT-ZAMBIA	Kenneth Kaunda International Airport	1991	
Royal Zambian Airlines		3Q			Kenneth Kaunda International Airport	2020	

=== Charter ===
Airline	Image	IATA	ICAO	Callsign	Hub airport(s)	Founded	Notes
Corporate Air Charters					Kenneth Kaunda International Airport	1995	
Royal Air Charters					Kenneth Kaunda International Airport	2007	
Staravia					Kenneth Kaunda International Airport	1982	
Skytrails Limited					Kenneth Kaunda International Airport	2003	
Procharter ltd					Kenneth Kaunda International Airport	2012	

== See also ==
- List of defunct airlines of Zambia
- List of airports in Zambia
