= List of airline codes (Z) =

This is a list of all airline codes. The table lists the IATA airline designators, the ICAO airline designators and the airline call signs (telephony designator). Historical assignments are also included for completeness.

== Codes ==
Airline codes
| IATA | ICAO | Airline | Call sign | Country | Comments |
|---|---|---|---|---|---|
| | BZE | Zenith Aviation | ZENSTAR | United Kingdom | 2014 |
| | AZB | Zaab Air | ZAAB AIR | Ghana | |
| | AZJ | Zas Air | | Egypt | |
| | AZR | Zenith Air | ZENAIR | South Africa | |
| | CDC | Zhejiang Loong Airlines | HUALONG | China | |
| | CIT | Zanesville Aviation | ZANE | United States | |
| FS | AYN | FlyArystan | Arystan | Kazakhstan | |
| | EMR | Zenmour Airlines | ZENMOUR | Mauritania | |
| | EZD | Zest Airways | ZEST AIRWAYS | Philippines | |
| | GZQ | Zagros Air | ZAGROS | Iraq | |
| C4 | IMX | Zimex Aviation | ZIMEX | Switzerland | |
| | IZG | Zagros Airlines | ZAGROS | Iran | |
| | JTU | Zhetysu | ZHETYSU | Kazakhstan | |
| | KVZ | Z-Aero Airlines | | Ukraine | |
| | KZH | Zhez Air | | Kazakhstan | |
| | MBG | Zephyr Aviation | CHALGROVE | United Kingdom | |
| | MLU | Zracno Pristaniste Mali Losinj | MALI LOSINJ | Croatia | |
| | MZE | Zenith Aviation (Malta) | | Malta | |
| | ORZ | Zorex | ZOREX | Spain | |
| | PZY | Zapolyarye Airline Company | ZAPOLYARYE | Russia | |
| | RZR | Zephyr Express | RECOVERY | United States | |
| | RZU | Zhersu Avia | ZHERSU AVIA | Kazakhstan | |
| | SYZ | Zil Air | ZIL AIR | Seychelles | |
| | TAN | Zanair | ZANAIR | Tanzania | |
| | ZAI | Zaire Aero Service | ZASAIR | Democratic Republic of Congo | |
| | ZAK | Zambia Skyways | ZAMBIA SKIES | Zambia | |
| | ZAR | Zairean Airlines | ZAIREAN | Democratic Republic of the Congo | |
| | ZAV | Zetavia | ZETAVIA | Ukraine | |
| | ZAW | Zoom Airways | ZED AIR | Bangladesh | |
| | ZMA | Zambezi Airlines | ZAMBEZI WINGS | Zambia | |
| | RZV | Z-Avia | ZEDAVIA | Armenia | ICAO Code and callsign no longer allocated |
| Q3 | MBN | Zambian Airways | ZAMBIANA | Zambia | |
| | ZAN | Zantop International Airlines | ZANTOP | United States | ICAO Code and callsign no longer allocated |
| | ZAS | ZAS Airlines of Egypt | ZAS AIRLINES | Egypt | ICAO Code and callsign no longer allocated |
| | CJG | Zhejiang Airlines | ZHEJIANG | China | ICAO Code and callsign no longer allocated |
| | CFZ | Zhongfei General Aviation | ZHONGFEI | China | |
| | CYN | Zhongyuan Aviation | ZHONGYUAN | China | ICAO Code and callsign no longer allocated |
| 3J | WZP | Zip | ZIPPER | Canada | ICAO Code and callsign no longer allocated |
| ZG | TZP | Zipair Tokyo | ZIPPY | Japan | Subsidiary of Japan Airlines |
| Z4 | OOM | Zoom Airlines | ZOOM | Canada | defunct, ICAO Code and callsign no longer allocated |
| | ORZ | Zorex | ZOREX | Spain | |

== IATA Traffic Conference Areas ==
The International Air Transport Association (IATA) divides the world into three areas called the Traffic Conference Areas (TCAs) for air travel purposes. These areas are used to define geographical boundaries for fare construction and other industry-related practices:

- Traffic Conference Area 1 (TC1) – this area includes the Americas, encompassing North America (the Caribbean, Central America, and Northern America) and South America.
- Traffic Conference Area 2 (TC2) – this area includes the EMEA region, encompassing Europe, the Middle East, and Africa (North Africa and Sub-Saharan Africa).
- Traffic Conference Area 3 (TC3) – this area includes the Asia–Pacific region, encompassing the rest of Asia (Central Asia, East Asia, North Asia, South Asia, and Southeast Asia) and Oceania.

Essentially, TC1 covers the "New World", while TC2 and TC3 together cover the "Old World" (Africa-Eurasia) and the "Land Down Under".

== See also ==
- IATA airport code
- ICAO airport code
