= AZJ =

AZJ, azj, etc. may refer to:

- azj, ISO 639-3 foir North Azerbaijani language
- AZJ, ASX ticker for Aurizon, freight rail transport company in Australia
- AZJ, ICAO code for Zas Air, Egypt
- AZJ, IATA code for Zhenjiang Dalu General Airport in Zhenjiang, China
