= Zambo (surname) =

Zambo or Zámbó is a surname. Notable people with the surname include:

- André-Frank Zambo Anguissa (born 1995), Cameroonian football midfielder
- Bence Zámbó (born 1989), Hungarian football player
- Gundis Zámbó (born 1966), German actress of Austrian and Hungarian origins
- Jean Zambo (born 1959), Cameroonian handball coach
- Jimmy Zámbó (1958–2001), Hungarian pop singer
- Lawrence Zámbó (died 1402), Hungarian cleric
- Nicholas Zámbó (died 1395), Hungarian treasurer and judge, uncle of Lawrence
- Sándor Zámbó (born 1944), Hungarian footballer

== See also ==
- Zamba (name)
- Zambo (disambiguation)
