= 1977 Dan-Air Boeing 707 crash =

1977 cargo plane crash in Lusaka, Zambia

1977 Dan-Air/IAS Cargo Boeing 707 crash
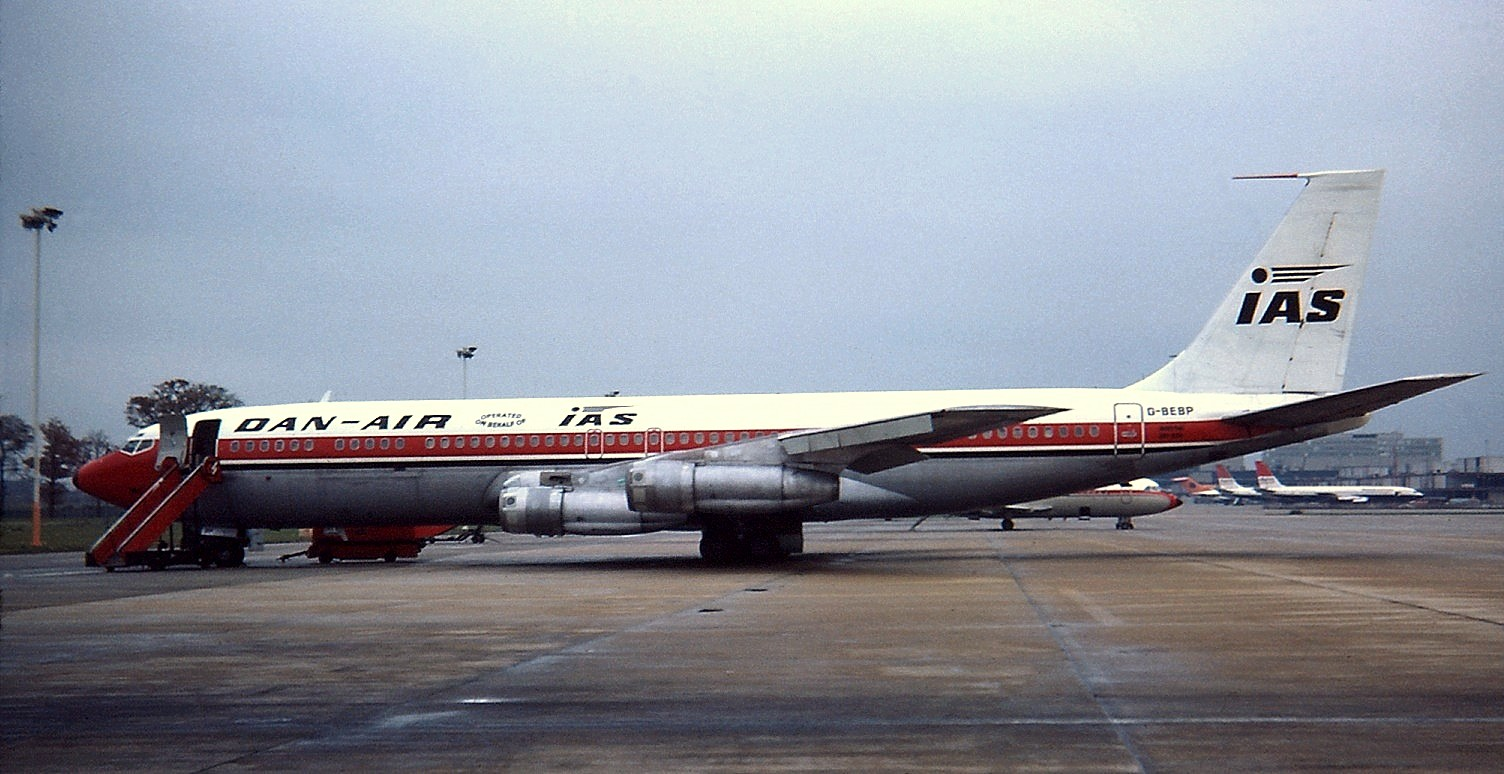
- G-BEBP, the Dan-Air Boeing 707 involved, six months before the crash in November 1976

Accident
- Date: 14 May 1977
- Summary: Structural failure of the right horizontal stabiliser due to metal fatigue and aircraft design flaw
- Site: Near Lusaka Airport, Lusaka, Zambia; 15.326°S 028.400°E

Aircraft
- Aircraft type: Boeing 707-321C
- Operator: Dan Air Services Ltd
- Registration: G-BEBP
- Flight origin: London Heathrow Airport (LHR), London, United Kingdom
- 1st stopover: Hellinikon Airport, Athens, Greece
- Last stopover: Jomo Kenyatta International Airport, Nairobi, Kenya
- Destination: Lusaka Airport, Lusaka, Zambia
- Occupants: 6
- Passengers: 0
- Crew: 6
- Fatalities: 6
- Survivors: 0

The 1977 Dan-Air/IAS Cargo Boeing 707 crash was a fatal accident involving a Boeing 707 cargo aircraft operated by Dan Air Services Limited on behalf of International Aviation Services Limited (trading as IAS Cargo Airlines at the time of the accident), which had been sub-contracted by Zambia Airways Corporation to operate a weekly scheduled all-cargo service between London Heathrow and the Zambian capital Lusaka via Athens and Nairobi. The aircraft crashed during approach to Lusaka Airport, Zambia, on 14 May 1977. All six crew members of the aircraft were killed.

== History of aircraft ==
The aircraft was a Boeing 707-321C that first entered service with Pan American World Airways (Pan Am) in 1963. This aircraft was also the first convertible 707 built, featuring a large freight door on the left-hand side of the forward fuselage, that permitted the carriage of main deck cargo when configured as a freighter. Dan-Air acquired the aircraft in 1976. It was the fourth 707 the UK independent (Note: the term "independent" in this context denotes private, generally unsubsidised UK airlines that were financially and operationally independent from the crown corporations, i.e. British European Airways, British Overseas Airways Corporation and British Airways (prior to privatisation)) operated, as well as the type's second turbofan-powered and second convertible example in service with the airline. At the time of the accident, it had flown about 47,000 hours.

== Flight ==
The three-legged flight originated from London Heathrow Airport to Athens (Hellinikon Airport), which was uneventful; from Athens it then proceeded to Nairobi (Jomo Kenyatta International Airport). Departure from Nairobi for Lusaka on the final leg occurred as planned at 07:17, 14 May.

The 707 cruised at flight level 310 for about two hours, after which it was cleared for descent to flight level 110. Flight level 110 was reached at approximately 09:23, and clearance was granted to begin descent towards a target of flight level 70. Just before 09:30, clearance to descend to 6,000 ft (1,800 m) was granted, and moments later the plane was cleared to make a visual approach to runway 10. A few minutes later, witnesses saw the entire right horizontal stabiliser and elevator assembly detach from the aircraft. The aircraft subsequently lost pitch control and entered a nose-dive from about 800 ft (240 m) to ground level, destroying the aircraft on impact.

There were no survivors among the five crew members and one jumpseat passenger on board the aircraft. There were no other fatalities on the ground. The wreckage was located approximately 12,010 ft (3,660 m) from the runway.

== Investigation ==
A full investigation was launched by the Zambian authorities and the investigation was then delegated to the UK Air Accidents Investigation Branch (AAIB).

It was determined that the structure of the right horizontal stabiliser failed due to metal fatigue in the rear spar structure, and due to the lack of an adequate fail-safe structure or device should such an event occur. The investigation also identified deficiencies in the assessment of aircraft designs and their certification and in the way aircraft were inspected.

The Boeing 707 320/420 series had an enlarged horizontal stabiliser (tailplane) assembly compared to earlier 707 aircraft, and in the redesign the increased loads on the tailplane structure had been taken by replacing some of the aluminium skinning with stainless steel. In addition, the spar attachment fittings had been redesigned, making them both stronger and stiffer. This had the unforeseen effect of changing the way the tailplane structure handled gust loads, the stiffer fittings being no longer able to help in absorbing and transferring the stresses caused by gusts and other normal aerodynamic loads, the flexure (i.e., the bending loads) of the left and right horizontal stabilizers instead having to be carried by the stabiliser spars entirely by themselves. This led over time to fatigue cracking in the right horizontal stabiliser's rear spar, which, due to the concealed (internal) nature of the tailplane construction, was not noticed by maintenance engineers.

The 707 had been designed to a 'fail-safe' philosophy, and failure of the tailplane rear spar had been calculated to be insufficient to cause the loss of the aircraft, the remaining front spar being sufficiently strong to enable the aircraft to land safely, the damage then being expected to be repaired before the aircraft was re-flown.

However, the accident aircraft had developed a cracked rear right spar without the fault being detected due to its location within part of the structure not normally accessible during routine maintenance, and the aircraft had been flown for a considerable number of hours with the fault present. Over time, the crack grew until, it was surmised, the damaged spar was no longer capable of carrying its designed load, whereupon the load was then taken over entirely by the front spar. The accident aircraft encountered several strong gusts during the approach immediately before the accident which, while not dangerous to a structurally sound Boeing 707, exceeded the load capable of being carried by the remaining intact spar on its own, leading to the spar eventually breaking and resulting in complete structural failure of the entire right horizontal stabiliser.

Tests were conducted to determine whether or not the loss of a single stabilizer was a recoverable situation, and it was determined that recovery would have been possible with action on behalf of the pilots in the form of nose up trim. The wreckage recovered revealed that the elevator trim should have been sufficient to save the aircraft, but further analysis concluded that the failure of the stabilizer was violent enough to fracture the vertical trim jackscrew, which would have resulted in the remaining horizontal stabilizer pitching into a nose down trim position.

The crack found in the failed stabiliser after the accident was thought by investigators unlikely to have been detectable using normal testing means, such as fluorescent dye. It was also thought that the crack had been present for at least 6,000 flight hours before the accident and before the aircraft had been acquired by Dan-Air from Pan Am.

Inspections of the Boeing 707-300 fleet, made as a result of the crash, found another 38 aircraft with similar cracks.
