= Zamba =

Zamba may refer to:

- Zamba (artform), a style of music and dance
- Zamba (mythology), a creator-god
- Zamba (name)
- Zamba (film), a 1949 film directed by William Berke
- Zamba language, a Bantu language
- In the language Lingala (DR Congo) "zamba" translates to "forest"
