= Mahogany Air =

Zambian airline

IATA	ICAO	Call sign
KT	HOG	HOGAN AIR
- Founded: March 2014
- Commenced operations: 1 July 2016
- Hubs: Kenneth Kaunda International Airport
- Focus cities: Harry Mwanga Nkumbula International Airport; Simon Mwansa Kapwepwe International Airport
- Fleet size: 3
- Destinations: 6
- Headquarters: Lusaka, Zambia
- Key people: Dr Jim Belemu (CEO)
- Website: www.mahoganyair.com

Mahogany Air is a Zambia regional airline based in Lusaka with its hub at Lusaka International Airport. Mahogany Air has its corporate headquarters at East Park Mall, Great East Road, Lusaka.

== History ==
Mahogany Air is a privately owned airline which was founded in 2013 by molecular scientist Jim Belemu and which began operations in 2016.

== Destinations ==
Mahogany Air flies domestic routes to Livingstone, Mansa, Ndola, and Solwezi and regional routes to Lubumbashi in the Democratic Republic of the Congo.

Country	City	Airport	Notes/Refs
Zambia	Lusaka	Lusaka International Airport	
Zambia	Livingstone	Harry Mwanga Nkumbula International Airport	
Zambia	Ndola	Simon Mwansa Kapwepwe International Airport	
Zambia	Mansa	Mansa Airport	
Zambia	Solwezi	Solwezi Airport	
Democratic Republic of the Congo	Lubumbashi	Lubumbashi International Airport	

== Fleet ==
Mahogany Air fleet
Aircraft	In service	Orders	Passengers				Notes
Aircraft	In service	Orders	F	C	Y	Total	Notes
Beechcraft 1900	1	—	—	—	19	19	
Embraer EMB 120	2	—	—	—	30	30	Wet-leased from Sahara African Aviation, South Africa
Total	3	—					
