= Zampa (disambiguation) =

Zampa is a French opéra comique.

Zampa may also refer to:

== People ==
- Adam Zampa (born 1992), Australian cricketer
- Adam Žampa (born 1990), Slovak alpine skier
- Al Zampa (1905–2000), American bridge worker
- Andreas Žampa (born 1993), Slovak alpine skier
- Enrico Zampa (born 1992), Italian footballer
- Luigi Zampa (1905–1991), Italian film director
- Sandra Zampa (born 1956), Italian politician

== Places ==
- Pangri Zampa Monastery, a monastery in Bhutan
- Zampa, Burkina Faso, a town
- Alfred Zampa Memorial Bridge, a bridge in the United States

== Other ==
- Euphaedra zampa, a type of butterfly
- Grover Zampa, an Indian vineyard and wine production company
- Zampa the Lion, a Millwall football mascot
