= Zambia Skyways =

IATA	ICAO	Call sign
K8	ZAK	ZAMBIA SKIES
- Hubs: Lusaka International Airport
- Headquarters: Lusaka, Zambia

Zambia Skyways was an airline based in Lusaka, Zambia. It was formerly known as Eastern Air, under which name it began operations in 1993 with two light aircraft. In 1997, its fleet expanded with the addition of a Let 410 18 seater.

In 1999, Eastern Air rebranded as Zambia Skyways.

In 2009, the airline resumed services partially with flights to Dubai and London through a partnership with Air Zimbabwe. The airline was allowed to use Air Zimbabwe's Boeing 737 and Boeing 767 aircraft. The revived service included international routes to London and Dubai, as well as regional destinations such as Lubumbashi and Harare.
