= Proflight Zambia =

Zambian airline

| IATA | ICAO | Call sign |
|---|---|---|
| P0 | PFZ | PROFLIGHT-ZAMBIA |
- Founded: 1991
- Hubs: Kenneth Kaunda International Airport
- Focus cities: Simon Mwansa Kapwepwe International Airport, Harry Mwanga Nkumbula International Airport
- Fleet size: 13
- Destinations: 12
- Headquarters: Lusaka, Zambia
- Key people: Tony Irwin (Founder & CEO)
- Employees: 645+
- Website: flyzambia.com

Proflight Zambia is an airline based in Lusaka, Zambia that serves the business community and tourism industry. It is a trading name of Proflight Commuter Services Ltd. Proflight Zambia operates the largest fleet of aircraft in Zambia, operating both scheduled and charter flights. The airline has been growing rapidly in recent years and is the largest airline in Zambia by routes served and fleet size. Proflight Zambia is an IOSA certified carrier.

== History ==
Proflight Air Services was founded in 1991 by pilot Tony Irwin, formerly of Zambia Airways. On 30 June 2009 the airline was authorized by the Zambia Competition Commission to form an alliance with Zambezi Airlines. The airline was officially rebranded as Proflight Zambia in 2010.

In March 2013 Proflight took delivery of its first jet aircraft, a Boeing 737-200, and later in 2013 began regional scheduled service to Lilongwe and Dar es Salaam. although the Boeing was returned to the lessor, Star Air Cargo, in 2014.

== Head Office ==
Proflight Zambia has its headquarters at 13396 Kamloops Avenue (Munali Roundabout), in Lusaka. It relocated there in August 2014.

== Destinations ==
| Country | City | Airport | Notes | Refs |
|---|---|---|---|---|
| Malawi | Lilongwe | Kamuzu International Airport | Terminated | |
| Namibia | Windhoek | Hosea Kutako International Airport | | |
| South Africa | Cape Town | Cape Town International Airport | | |
| South Africa | Durban | King Shaka International Airport | | |
| South Africa | Johannesburg | O. R. Tambo International Airport | | |
| Zambia | Jeki | Jeki Airstrip | Seasonal | |
| Zambia | Kalumbila | Kalumbila Airport | | |
| Zambia | Kasama | Kasama Airport | | |
| Zambia | Livingstone | Harry Mwanga Nkumbula International Airport | | |
| Zambia | Lusaka | Kenneth Kaunda International Airport | Hub | |
| Zambia | Mansa | Mansa Airport | | |
| Zambia | Mfuwe | Mfuwe Airport | | |
| Zambia | Ndola | Simon Mwansa Kapwepwe International Airport | | |
| Zambia | Royal | Royal Airstrip | Seasonal | |
| Zambia | Solwezi | Solwezi Airport | | |

=== Interline agreement ===
Proflight Zambia interlines with the following airlines:

- Air Tanzania
- CemAir
- Emirates
- Turkish Airlines

== Fleet ==
The Proflight Zambia fleet includes the following aircraft (as of October 2025):

Proflight Zambia fleet
| Aircraft | In service | Orders | Passengers | Notes | Refs |
|---|---|---|---|---|---|
| Bombardier CRJ200 | 4 | | 50 | Freighter | |
| British Aerospace Jetstream 32 | 1 | | 18 | | |
| British Aerospace Jetstream 41 | 7 | | 29 | | |
Cargo fleet
| Bombardier CRJ100 Parcel Freighter | 1 | | – | | |
| Total | 13 | | | | |
