= Zambo (disambiguation) =

Zambo is a racial term used to identify individuals of mixed African and Amerindian ancestry. Zambo or Zámbó may also refer to

- Zamboanga Peninsula
- Zambo (surname)
- Arturo "Zambo" Cavero (1940–2009), an Afro-Peruvian singer
- Zambo Department, a department in Ioba Province, Burkina Faso
- Zambo, Ghana, a town in the Lawra District, Upper West Region, Ghana
- Zambo, King of the Jungle a 1972 jungle adventure starring Brad Harris

== See also ==
- Sambo (disambiguation)
