= Pangri Zampa Monastery =

Buddhist monastery in Bhutan

- Location within Bhutan

Religion
- Affiliation: Tibetan Buddhism

Location
- Location: Bhutan
- Country: Bhutan
- Interactive map of Pangri Zampa Monastery
- Coordinates: 27.5261°N 89.6442°E

Pangri Zampa Monastery is a Buddhist monastery in Bhutan, near Thimphu. The monastery is a College of Bhutanese Astrology.
