= Zambezi Airlines =

Zambian privately owned airline

IATA	ICAO	Call sign
ZJ	ZMA	ZAMBEZI WINGS
- Founded: 2008
- Ceased operations: 2012
- Hubs: Kenneth Kaunda International Airport
- Fleet size: 1
- Destinations: 9
- Headquarters: Lusaka, Zambia
- Website: www.flyzambezi.com (defunct)

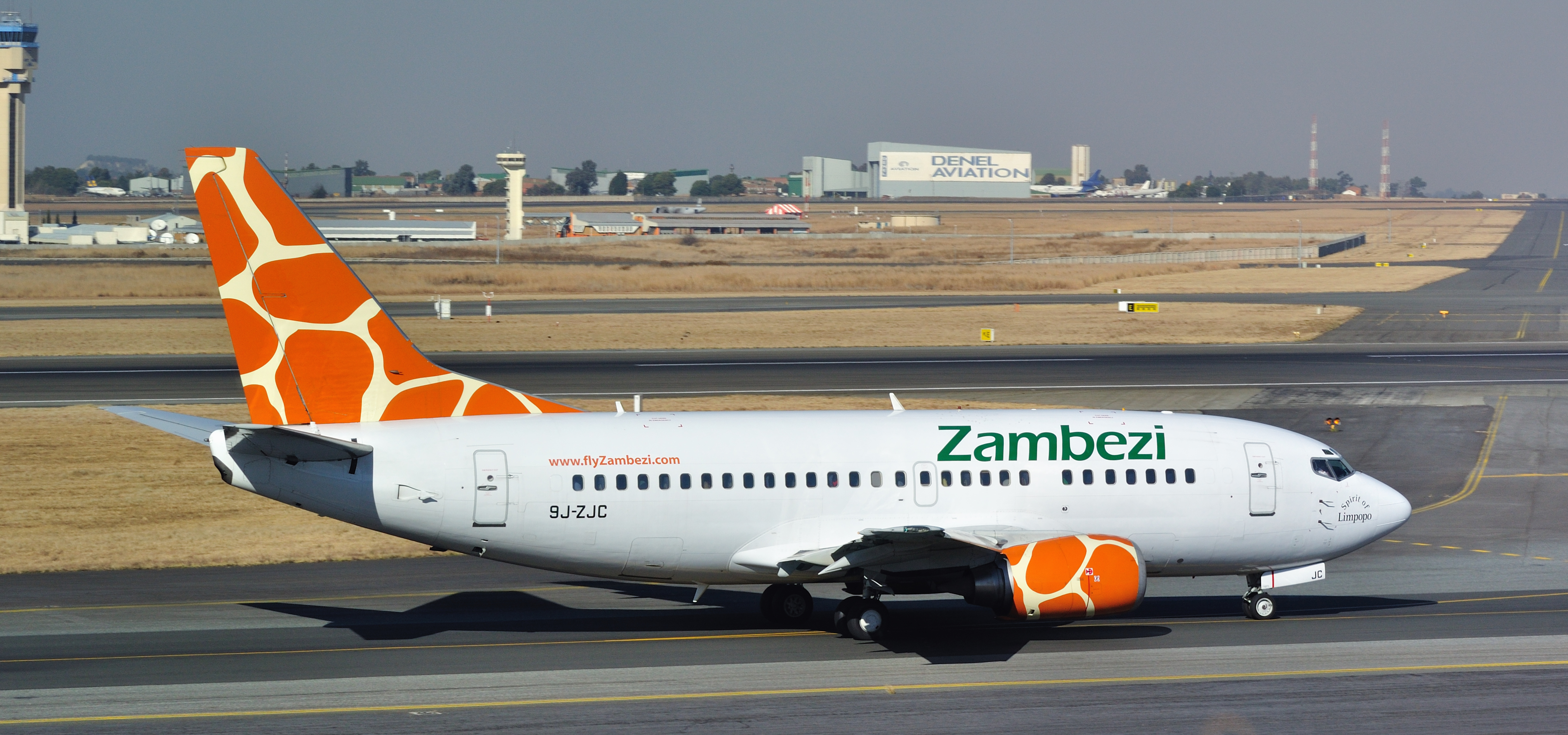
Zambezi Aircraft at OR Tambo International Airport

Zambezi Airlines was a privately owned airline headquartered in Lusaka, Zambia, that operated flights to south and western Africa out of its base at Kenneth Kaunda International Airport.

== History ==
Zambezi Airlines began operations in July 2008. The airline first operated an Embraer 120. In May 2009, it acquired two Boeing 737-500. In June 2009, operations to Johannesburg and Dar es Salaam commenced. In the same month, the airline was authorized by the Zambia Competition Commission to form an alliance with Proflight Commuter Services.

On 1 November 2011, the airline licence of Zambezi Airlines was suspended because of safety issues. Subsequently, the airline was dismantled in 2012.
