= Zambian Airways =

Airline in Zambia

IATA	ICAO	Call sign
Q3	MBN	ZAMBIANA
- Founded: 1948
- Ceased operations: 2009
- Hubs: Lusaka International Airport
- Fleet size: 5
- Destinations: 6
- Headquarters: Lusaka, Zambia
- Key people: Mutembo Nchito (CEO); Bernard Chiwala (CCO); Donald MacDonald (CFO)

Zambian Airways was an airline based in Lusaka, Zambia. It suspended operations on January 10, 2009.

== History ==
The airline was formed as a part of the Northern Rhodesia Aviation services in 1948. After the white minority led Rhodesia's Unilateral Declaration of Independence in 1965, the airline remained within Zambian territory and was renamed to Mines Air Services Limited (MAS) as a subsidiary of Zambia Consolidated Copper Mines (ZCCM). As part of the process of privatisation of the mines, MAS was disposed of by the government of Zambia on 28 April 1998 and renamed Roan Air for a single year. It changed its name to Zambian Airways in 1999, and British Airways franchised the airline in early 2001. At the time of its purchase, the airline was a joint venture, with an ownership stake by British Airway's South African franchisee, Comair, and Roan Air Holdings of Zambia.

MAS purchased two new Raytheon Beech 1900D Airliner aircraft from Raytheon Credit Corporation (RCC) in July and August 1998 respectively. The company has been operating these two aircraft since then, under the trading name of Zambian Airways. On 10 January 2009, the company announced a suspension of operations, citing high fuel costs as the main reason. The firm was embroiled in a corruption scandal at the same time as the announced closure of the airline.

== Accusations of corruption ==
It was reported that Nchito, then CEO of Zambian Airlines and the Director of Public Prosecutions, granted a role at the airline to Fred M'membe in exchange for a board position at a former national newspaper, The Post. Additionally, Nchito was accused of receiving millions of kwacha from the airline, without disclosing services provided. Zambia's Task Force on Corruption were then asked to investigate the scandal. Nchito was subsequently appointed to the same Task Force, causing public backlash.

After the end of operations, shareholders were not available for comment in order to answer questions about when or if the airline may commence operations again. According to a statement made by the Zambian Minister of Communications and Transport, Dora Siliya, forty one passengers had been stranded in Johannesburg as a direct result of the airline suspension of operations. The Zambian government announced on 9 February 2009 that it intended to sue Zambian Airways in order to recover the outstanding loans the airline held with a number of firms. The airlines debt was estimated to be to be US$29 million.

== Fleet ==
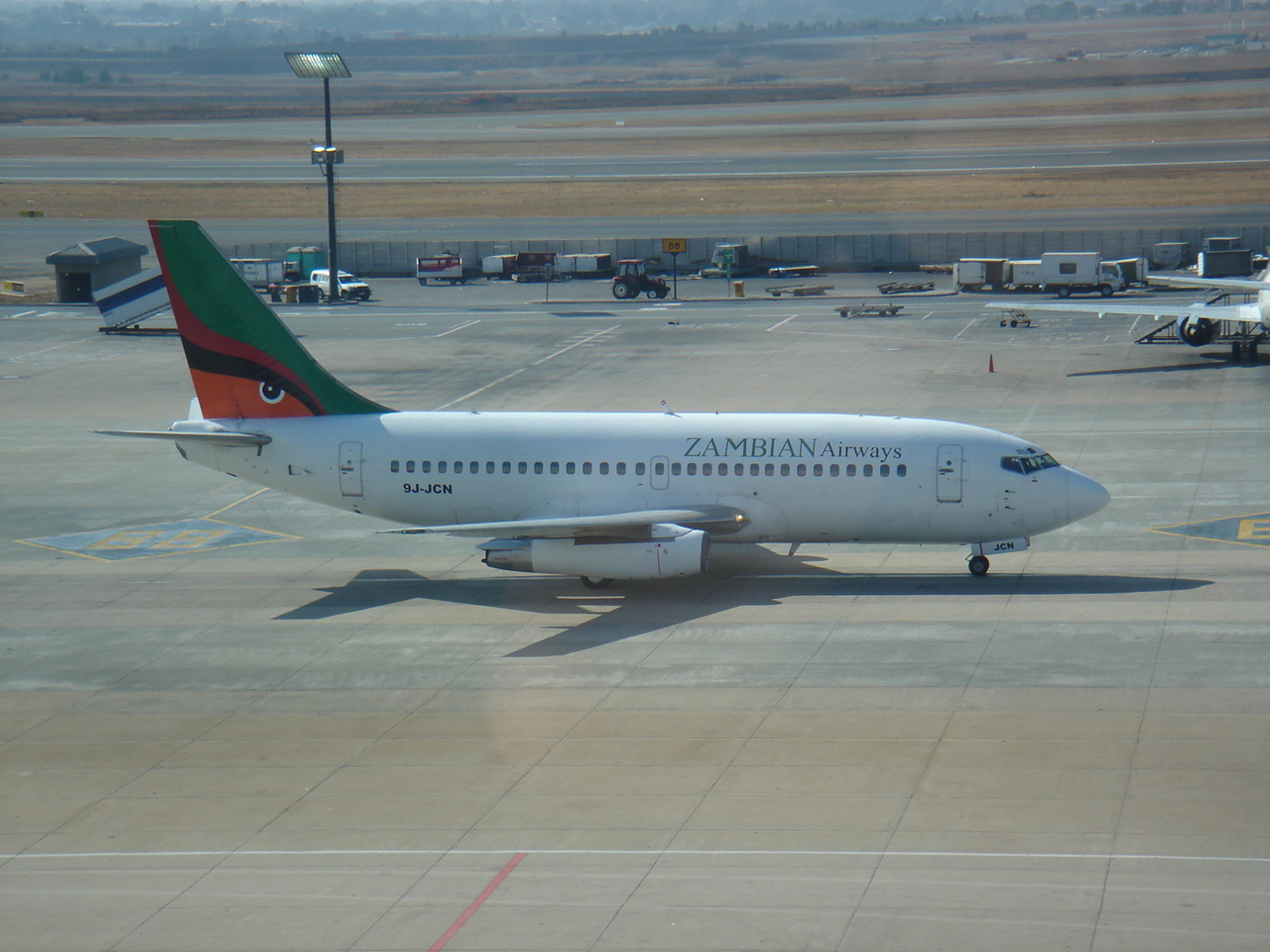
A Zambian Airways Boeing 737-200 at OR Tambo International Airport

The Zambian Airways fleet consisted of the following aircraft (as of 24 September 2008):

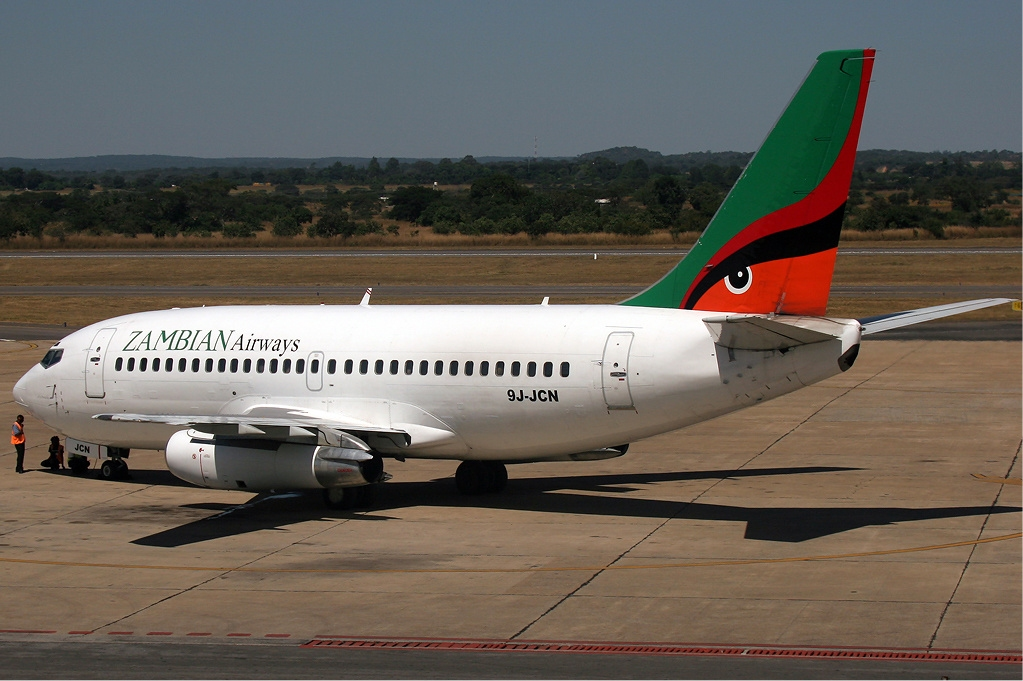
A Zambian Airways Boeing 737-200 in Lusaka, April 2007.

Zambian Airways fleet
Aircraft	Total	Passengers			Routes	Notes
Aircraft	Total	J	Y	Total	Routes	Notes
Boeing 737-200	3	12	106	118	South Africa and Tanzania	2 aircraft are leased from Safair
Beechcraft 1900	2	0	18	18	Domestic and Zimbabwe	
Total	5				Updated: September 2008	
