= Harry Mwaanga Nkumbula International Airport =

Airport in Zambia

Harry Mwaanga Nkumbula International Airport Livingstone Airport
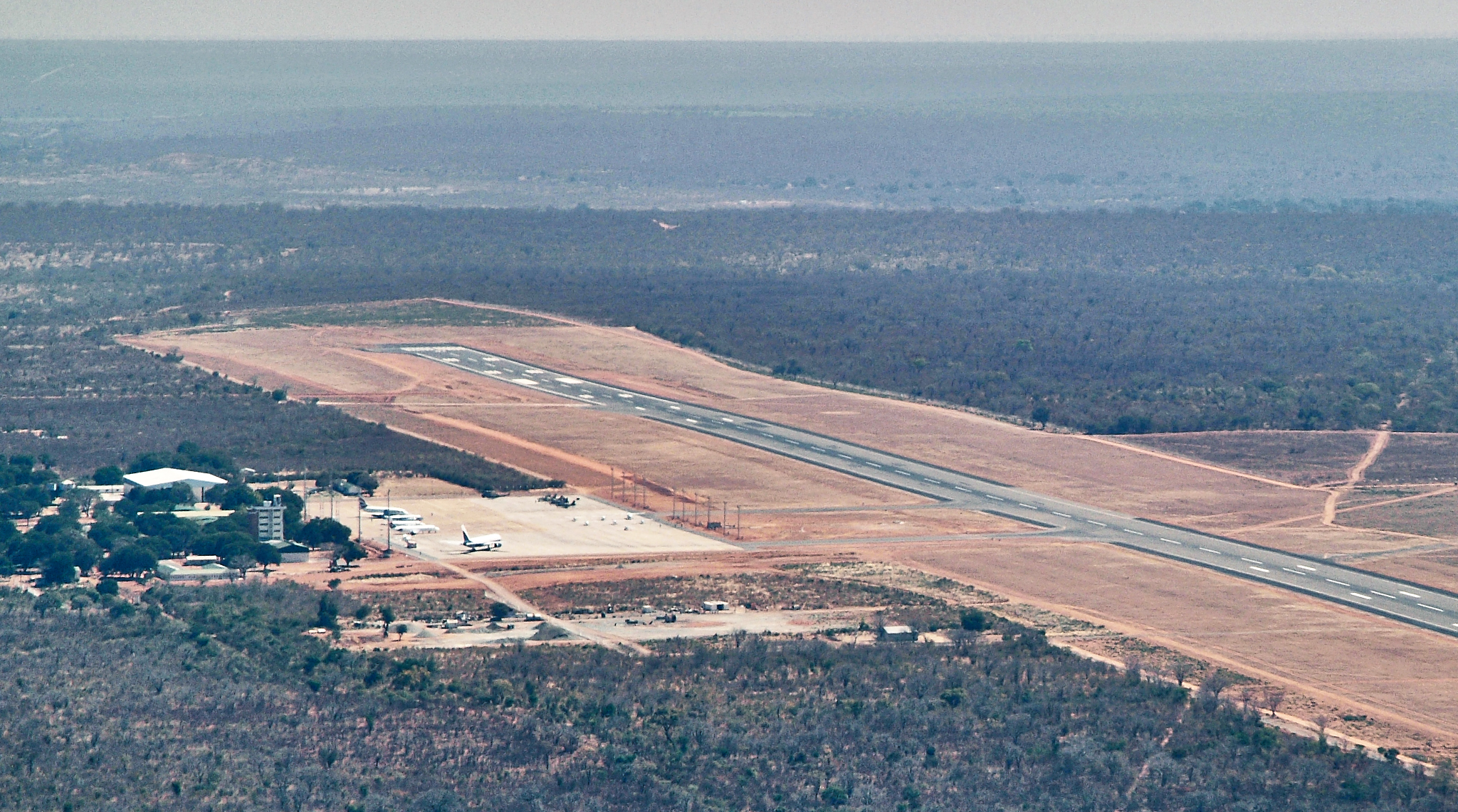
- IATA: LVI; ICAO: FLHN

Summary
- Airport type: Military/Public
- Location: Livingstone, Zambia
- Elevation AMSL: 3,255 ft (992 m)
- Coordinates: 17°49′18″S 25°49′20″E
- Website: zacl.co.zm/airport-section/airports/hmnia

Map
- Location of the airport in Zambia

Runways
Direction	Length		Surface
Direction	m	ft	Surface
10/28	3,000	9,843	Asphalt
15/33	1,372	4,501	Dirt

Harry Mwaanga Nkumbula International Airport (IATA: LVI, ICAO: FLHN), formerly Livingstone Airport (ICAO: FLLI), is an international airport on the northern edge of Livingstone, Zambia. The airport is named after Harry Mwaanga Nkumbula, who was a leader of the Zambian African National Congress.

== Location ==
The airport is located in the north-western suburbs of the city of Livingstone, approximately 5 kilometres (3 mi), by road, from downtown. The airport sits at 3,255 feet (992 m) above mean sea level.

== Overview ==
Constructed in 1950, as a domestic airport, it became an international destination due to its proximity to the Victoria Falls, only 15 kilometres (9 mi) to the south, by road. Between 2011 and 2017, the government-owned Zambia Airports Corporation Limited (ZACL), which operates the airport, renovated and improved the airport infrastructure and facilities.

The renovations included a new terminal building, a new main runway, a new apron, and new apron lights. The previous airport could handle a maximum of 250,000 passengers a year. The new airport can handle anywhere from 700,000 to one million passengers annually. In 2019, 175,000 passengers passed through the airport.

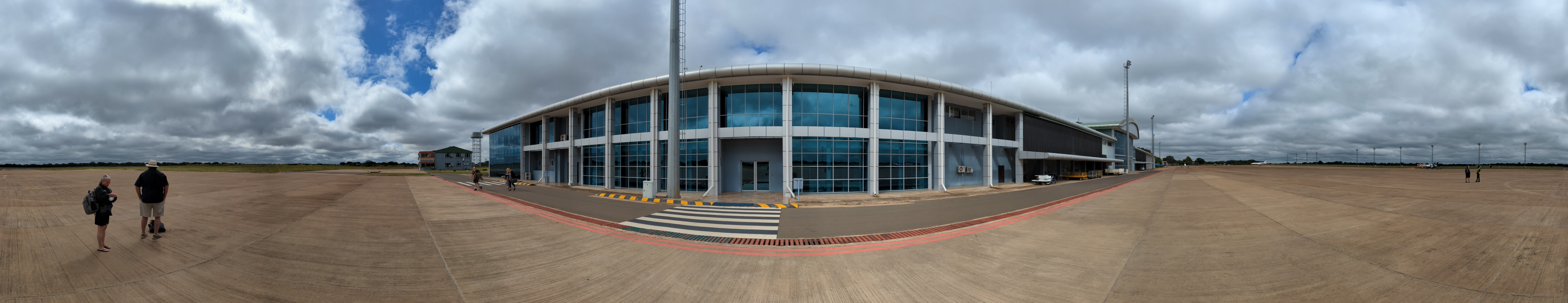
Panoramic view of Harry Mwaanga Nkumbula International Airport terminal from the tarmac side

== Facilities ==
The airport has two runways. The main runway 10/28, is the longer one. It is 7,520 feet (2,292 m) long and 197 feet (60 m) wide. It is paved and has runway lights. The shorter runway is 15/33. It is 4,501 feet (1,372 m) long and 98 feet (30 m) wide. It has a paved surface, but it has no runway lights.

== Airlines and destinations ==
Airlines	Destinations
Airlink	Johannesburg–O.R. Tambo, Mbombela
CemAir	Johannesburg–O. R. Tambo
FlySafair	Johannesburg–O. R. Tambo
Kenya Airways	Cape Town, Nairobi–Jomo Kenyatta
Proflight Zambia	Cape Town, Lusaka, Windhoek–Hosea Kutako
Zambia Airways	Johannesburg–O. R. Tambo, Lusaka

== See also ==
- Transport in Zambia
- List of airports in Zambia
- Victoria Falls Airport - the airport on the Zimbabwean side of the Victoria Falls
