= Solwezi Airport =

- IATA: SLI; ICAO: FLSW

Summary
- Airport type: Public
- Serves: Solwezi
- Location: Solwezi, Zambia
- Elevation AMSL: 4,583 ft / 1,397 m
- Coordinates: 12°10′27″S 26°22′00″E

Map
- Location of the airport in Zambia

Runways
Direction	Length		Surface
Direction	ft	m	Surface
08/26	8,858	2,700	Asphalt
- Source: GCM Google Maps SkyVector

Solwezi Airport (IATA: SLI, ICAO: FLSW) is an airport serving Solwezi, a city in the North-Western Province of Zambia. The airport is the largest in the province and was upgraded by Kansanshi Mining PLC with the addition of a new runway able to handle the Boeing 737. Prior to the runway being upgraded there was a small 1200 meter runway not able to handle large aircraft, but with the upgrade of the runway after the mining boom, Proflight Zambia was able to deploy the British Aerospace Jetstream 41 to Solwezi. Also, the newly revived national carrier, Zambia Airways, has begun service from Lusaka to Solwezi utilizing a Dash 8-400.

== Location ==
The airport is located a few kilometers north off the T5, the main road in the area, and approximately 4 kilometres (2mi) northwest of the city centre of Solwezi, the capital and largest city in the North-Western Province.

== Airlines and destinations ==
Airlines	Destinations
Proflight Zambia	Lusaka
Zambia Airways	Lusaka, Kalumbila Airport

== Infrastructure ==
The runway at Solwezi airport is a 2,700m (8,858 ft) asphalt runway with 115 and 65 metres (377 and 213 ft) paved overruns on the east and west ends respectively to keep aircraft from overrunning the runway. Solwezi also has a non-directional beacon (Ident: SW) located on the field to help aircraft navigate towards the airport.

== See also ==
- Transport in Zambia
- List of airports in Zambia
