= O. R. Tambo International Airport =

Main airport serving Johannesburg, South Africa

O. R. Tambo International Airport O. R. Tambo Internasionale Lughawe (Afrikaans)

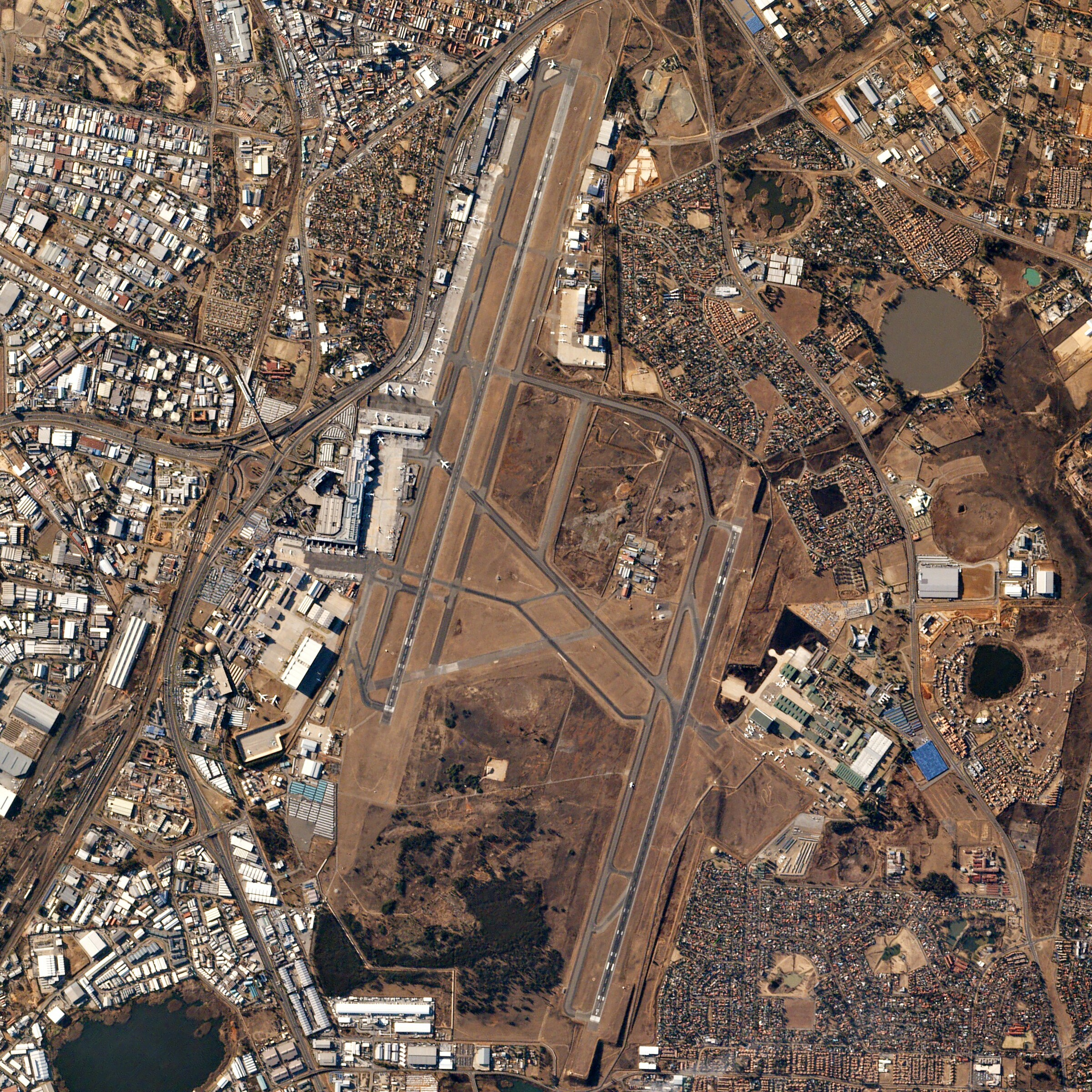
- Satellite view in 2016
- IATA: JNB; ICAO: FAOR; WMO: 68368

Summary
- Airport type: Public
- Owner/Operator: Airports Company South Africa
- Serves: Johannesburg; Pretoria
- Location: Kempton Park, Gauteng, South Africa
- Opened: 1952; 74 years ago
- Hub for: Airlink; CemAir; FlySafair; LIFT; South African Airways
- Time zone: SAST (UTC+02:00)
- Elevation AMSL: 5,558 ft (1,694 m)
- Coordinates: 26°08′00″S 028°15′00″E
- Website: OR Tambo Airport (Note: This is the most developed website, but it is not official. For the official website and other third-party websites, see the external links.)

Maps
- Interactive Map
- Location in the Johannesburg area JNB (South Africa) JNB (Africa)

Runways
Direction	Length		Surface
Direction	ft	m	Surface
03L/21R	14,495	4,421	Asphalt
03R/21L	11,155	3,405	Asphalt

Statistics (FY 2025–26)
- Passengers: 20,083,399
- Aircraft movements: 212,075
- Source: ACSA

O. R. Tambo International Airport (IATA: JNB, ICAO: FAOR) is an international airport serving the twin cities of Johannesburg and Pretoria, the administrative capital of South Africa. It is situated in Kempton Park, Gauteng. It serves as the primary airport for domestic and international travel for South Africa and since 2020, it is Africa's second busiest airport, with a capacity to handle up to 28 million passengers annually. The airport serves as the hub for South African Airways.

The airport was originally known as Jan Smuts International Airport, after the former South African Prime Minister. It was renamed Johannesburg International Airport in 1994, and subsequently on 27 October 2006 the airport was renamed after anti-apartheid politician Oliver Tambo (1917–1993). Its ICAO code was changed from FAJS to FAOR on 10 January 2013.

== History ==
The airport was founded in 1952 as Jan Smuts International Airport, two years after Smuts's death. Situated near the town of Kempton Park on the East Rand, it replaced Palmietfontein International Airport, which had handled European flights since 1945.

In 1943, a decision was made by the Cabinet of the Union of South Africa to construct three international airports with a Civil Airports Advisory Committee formed to investigate and report on the viability. That report was submitted to the Cabinet in March 1944 with one main international airport on the Witwatersrand and two smaller international airports at Cape Town and Durban. The South African Railways and Harbours Administration was given the role of managing the project and later in 1944, a member went to the United States to study standards and methods of construction. Four possible sites around Johannesburg were identified, with one south of Johannesburg chosen but soon discarded due to being situated on land with gold bearing reefs below. Sites were then narrowed down to Kempton Park and the existing airport at Palmietfontein.

Layouts and rough costing for the two sites were established and submitted for a ministerial decision. The site would be at Kempton Park and be named Jan Smuts Airport. The area outside Kempton Park was an expropriated undulating dairy farm of 3,706 acres with a 598 acre eucalyptus plantation. Sitting on a plateau, the area sloped away towards the east. The area was drained by the Blesbok River. The airport became operational on 1 September 1953. The new airport was officially opened by Minister for Transport, Paul Sauer on 4 October 1953 having taken eight years to build at £6.2 million. It had one main runway of 3,200 m (10,500 ft) and two smaller ones of 2,514 m (8,248 ft) that crossed the main with all runways being 60 m (200 ft) wide. A 1,000 men had been employed in the repair workshops. The technical areas consisted of 2,957 m (9,701 ft) of roads, 26,477 m^{2} (285,000 sq ft) of concrete apron while the hangars had openings of 106 m (348 ft) at a height of 21 m (69 ft). It was expecting to manage thirty flights-a-day and over 200,000 passengers that year. Airlines using the airport at its opening were BOAC, Air France, KLM, SAA, Central African Airways, Qantas, El Al, SAS Group and DETA.

In the late 1950s, jet passenger aircraft became the norm and there was a need to expand the existing ground facilities at the airport, which began in the 1960s and early-1970s. In addition to the new airside facilities, ground developments included: improved road access, parking areas, hotel, retail areas and car hire.

The late 1960s saw a new choice of aircraft for South African Airways, the Boeing 747. A decision was made by the Minister of Transport to obtain three, later five 747s for the airline. Delivery would begin in October 1971 with the first flight to London on 10 December 1971 with daily services from February 1972. These purchases however required new hangar facilities with the contract awarded in September 1969 initially worth R2,983,408. Construction started in December 1968 and was completed in October 1971 for R8,000,000 while other work at the airport associated with the arrival of these new aircraft brought the costs to R40,000,000. Other new buildings such as workshops, testing facilities, stores, staff accommodation and air cargo handling building were built. The new hangar would allow for two 747s in each bay with dimensions of 73.2 m wide, 24.4 m high and a depth of 91.4 m.

It was used as a test airport for Concorde during the 1970s, to determine how the aircraft would perform while taking off and landing at high elevations ('hot and high' testing). During the 1980s, many countries stopped trading with South Africa because of the United Nation sanctions imposed against South Africa in the struggle against apartheid, and many international airlines stopped flying to the airport. These sanctions also resulted in South African Airways being refused rights to fly over most African countries, and in addition, the risk of flying over some African countries was emphasised by the shooting down of two passenger aircraft over Rhodesia (e.g. Air Rhodesia Flight 825 and 827), forcing them to fly around the "bulge" of Africa. This required specially-modified aircraft like the long-range Boeing 747SP. A second runway was built at the airport in the late 1980s.

In December 1993, a R120,000,000 upgrade at the airport was completed. The main part of the projects was an 880 m, 3000 t steel airside corridor consisting of two levels high of 6 m wide with thirteen passenger bridges. The upper levels are connected to the departure lounges through security screening points. Lower levels are for arrivals for entry into the immigration and custom areas. A future provision for extensions to this airside corridor was included in the design. A new airside bus terminal was also added for bussing in passengers to aircraft not able dock next to the terminal. Other parts of the project included upgrading the terminal facilities for the passengers.

Following the ending of apartheid, the airport's name, and that of other international airports in South Africa, were changed and these restrictions were lifted. With the creation of the Airports Company of South Africa (ACSA) in the mid-nineties, a plan to commercialise the airport began with new passenger and retail and airside facilities to handle a larger number of aircraft completing this phase in 2004.

The airport overtook Cairo International Airport in 1996 as the busiest airport in Africa and is the fourth-busiest airport in the Africa–Middle East region after Dubai International Airport, Hamad International Airport, and Abu Dhabi International Airport. In fiscal year 2010, the airport handled 8.82 million departing passengers.

In late 2005, a proposal was made for the airport to be renamed "O. R. Tambo International", after former African National Congress President and anti-apartheid activist Oliver Tambo, in a change to the policy of neutrally-named airports. The proposal was formally announced in the Government Gazette of South Africa on 30 June 2006, allowing a 30-day window for the public to register objections. The name change was implemented on 27 October 2006 with the unveiling of new signs at the airport. Critics noted the expense involved in renaming the airport. Corne Mulder of the Freedom Front Plus described the renaming as "nothing less than political opportunism and attempts by the ANC government to dodge the true socio-economic issues of the country".

On 26 November 2006, the airport became the first in Africa to host the Airbus A380. The aircraft landed in Johannesburg on its way to Sydney via the South Pole on a test flight.

There was no provision for rapid train access until 2010, when the Gautrain opened and allowed passengers to reach the airport from the Johannesburg CBD, Sandton and Pretoria.

== Airport information ==
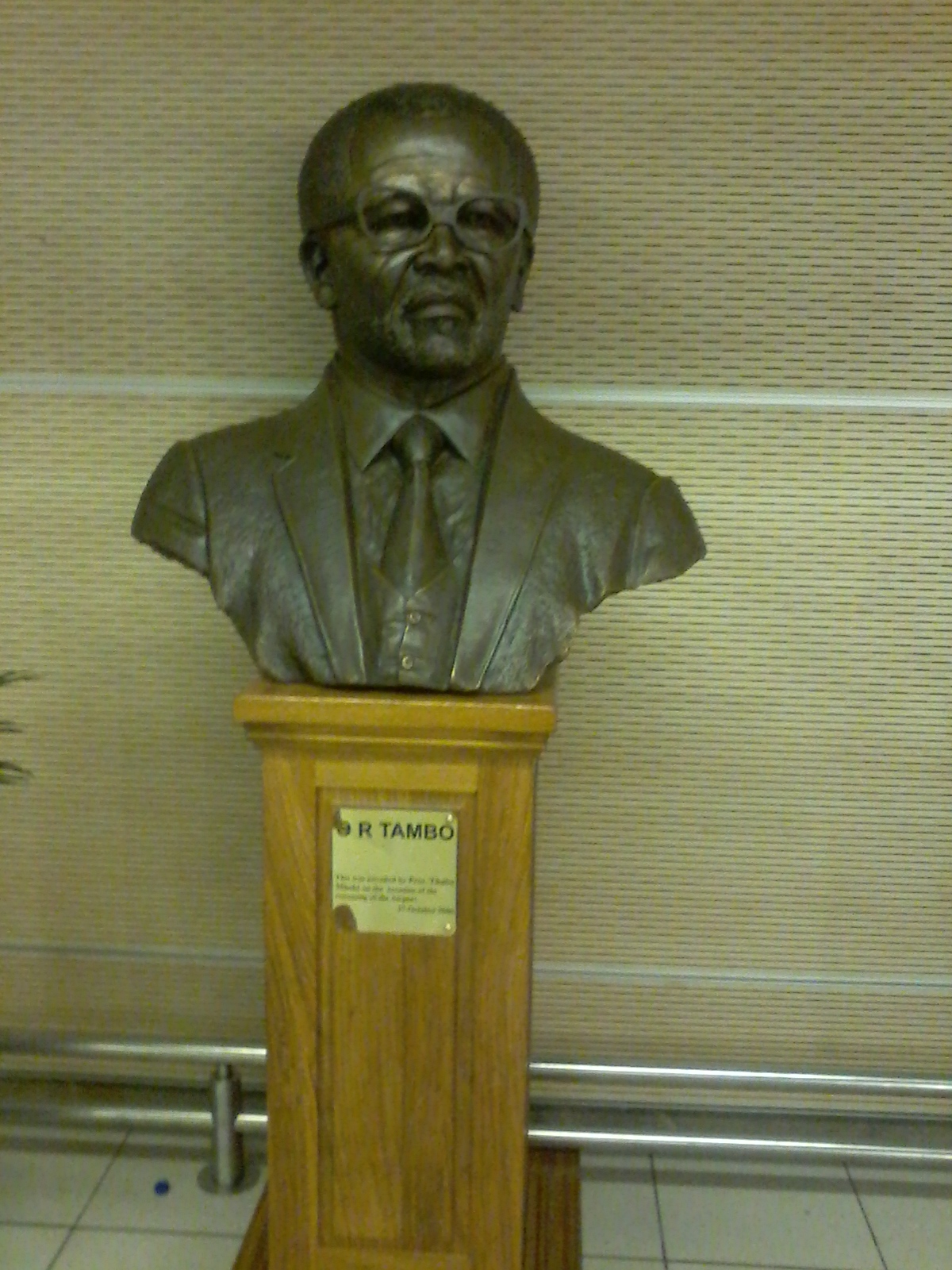
A now removed O. R. Tambo bust at the aircraft viewing deck above the CTB

O. R. Tambo International Airport is a hot and high airport. Situated 1,700 metres (5,500 feet) above mean sea level, the air is thin. This is the reason for the long runways.

On 10 January 2013 the airport's ICAO code was changed from FAJS to FAOR.

=== South African Airways Museum ===
The South African Airways Museum once was located at the airport. This room full of South African Airways memorabilia was started by two fans of the airline as a temporary location until they could set it up in one of Jan Smuts International's buildings in 1987. The museum has since relocated to Rand Airport (FAGM).

=== Aircraft viewing decks ===
The airport has two viewing decks. One is located above the Central Terminal Building, and the other in an administrative section of the airport above the international check-in counters. There are regular displays of Oliver Reginald Tambo, the airport's namesake in the viewing decks.

== Infrastructure ==
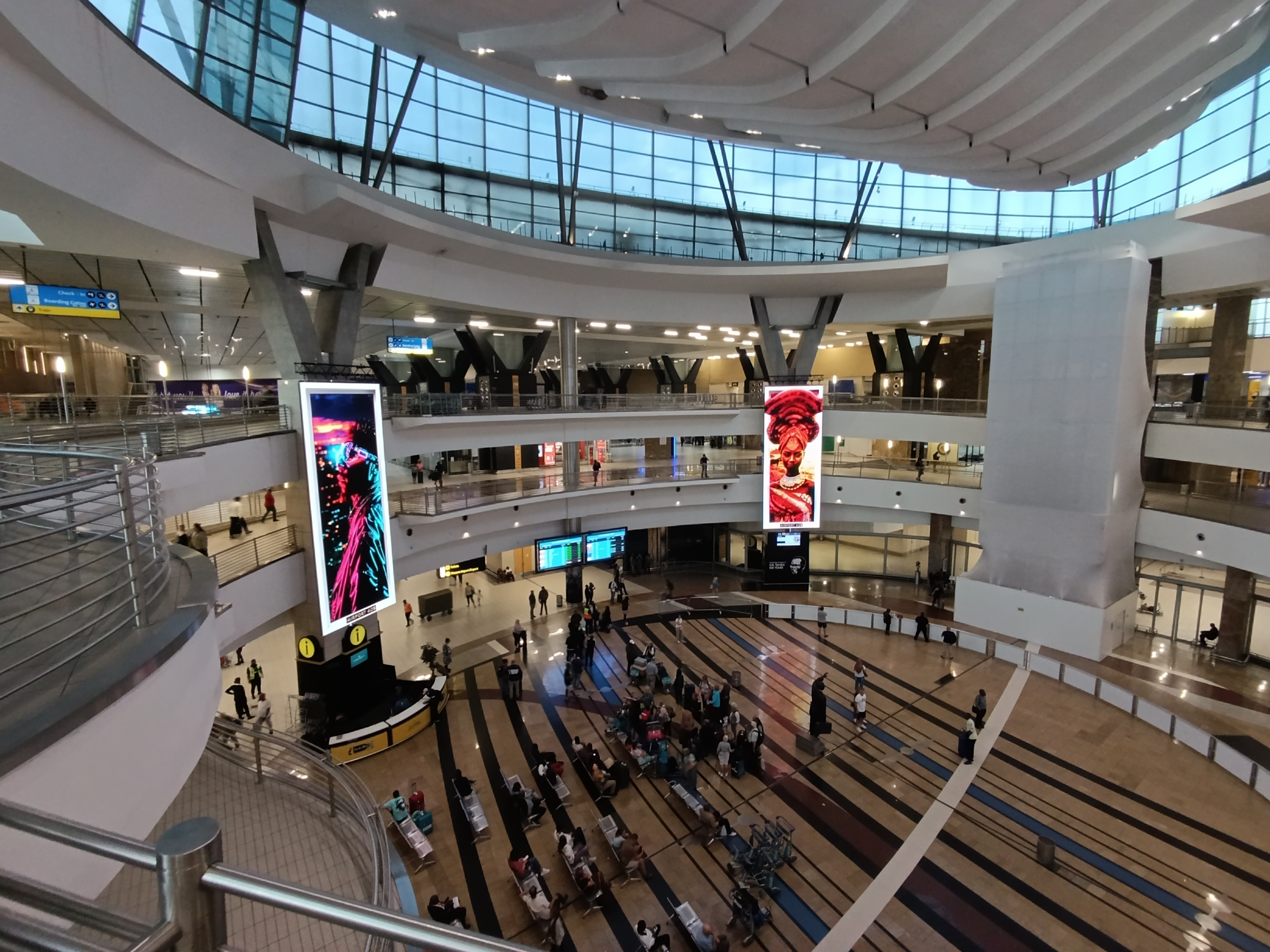
Inside the airport in 2024

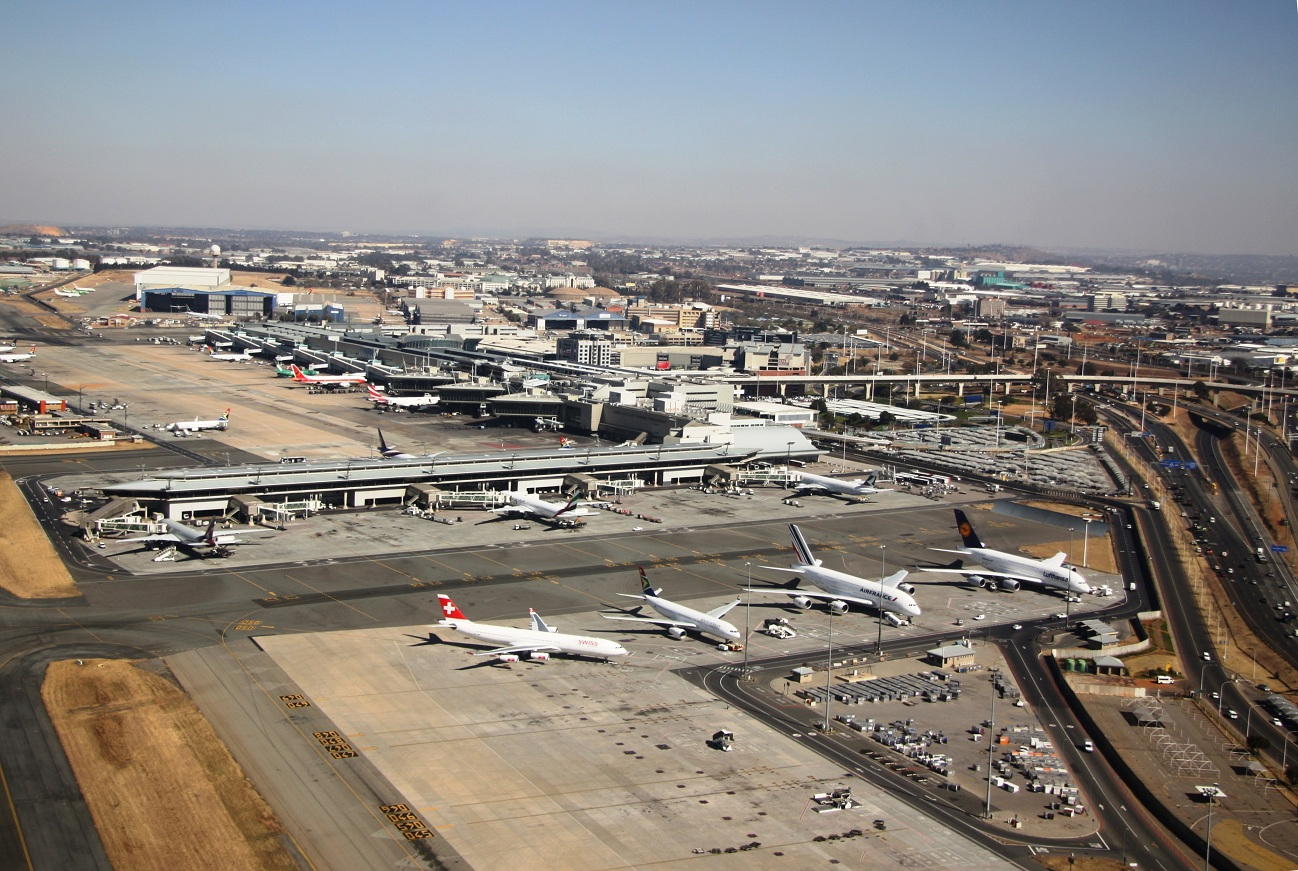
OR Tambo terminal buildings

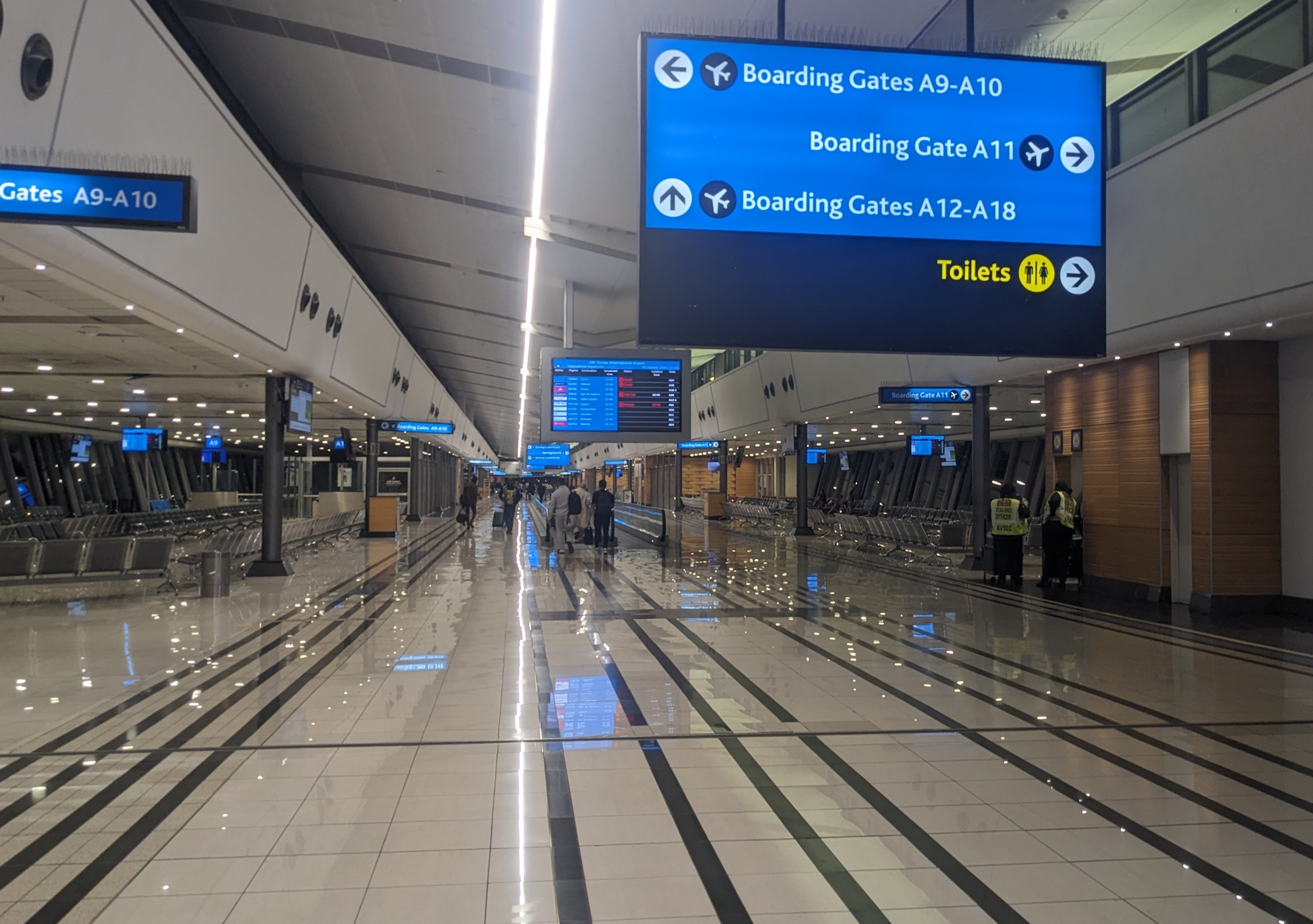
Departure gates in 2024

=== Runways ===
O. R. Tambo International Airport has two parallel runways adjacent to the airport's terminal buildings. There used to be a third runway, 09/27, but it was closed and became taxiway Juliet. Another decommissioned runway was 14/32 (which crossed runways 03L/21R and 03R/21L); it was converted into taxiway Echo.

Number	Length	Width	ILS	Notes
03L/21R	4,421 metres (14,505 ft)	60 metres (197 ft)	PALS CAT II	Fully laden aircraft require a far greater length of runway to achieve take-off velocity at this altitude. It is the 33rd longest runway in the world.
03R/21L	3,405 metres (11,171 ft)	60 metres (197 ft)	PALS CAT II	

The runways are equipped with approach lighting systems. Sequenced flashers are not used at any South African runways and therefore not installed. Touchdown zone (TDZ) lighting is available, but never turned on. Runway Threshold, Edge and Centerline lights are the only lighting available. During busy periods, outbound flights use the western runway (03L/21R) for take-off, while inbound flights use the eastern runway (03R/21L) for landing. Wind factors may cause numerous variations, but on most days flights will take off to the north and land from the south.

=== Taxiways and aprons ===
O. R. Tambo International Airport has a network of asphalt taxiways connecting runways, aprons and maintenance facilities. All of these taxiways are 30.5 metres wide, except for taxiways Echo and Juliet which are 60 metres wide; they were formerly runways 14/32 and 09/27, respectively. The airport also has nine aprons. Cargo aircraft park at aprons Golf and Whiskey. Many airlines have their aircraft wait long hours between arriving and departing flights. Such aircraft and other cargo aircraft are parked at aprons Delta and Foxtrot to free up jetbridges. Aprons Alpha, Charlie and Echo have jetbridges that connect them to their respective gates. The Bravo apron is not connected to the terminal building, and thus aircraft that are parked there must use an airport bus service.

== Developments ==
ACSA reported that major new developments took place at the airport, in preparation for the 2010 FIFA World Cup. The development includes expansion of the international terminal, with the new international pier (opened in 2009), which includes gates for the Airbus A380 and increased capacity at the same time. A new Central Terminal building, designed by Osmond Lange Architects and Planners, was completed on 1 April 2009. An additional multi-storey parkade was built in January 2010, at a cost of R470 million opposite the Central Terminal Building, plus Terminal A was also upgraded and the associated roadways realigned to accommodate more International Departures space.

The Central Terminal Building (CTB) (cost: R2 billion) boosted passenger capacity at the landside of the terminal in 3 levels, and allows direct access from international and domestic terminals. Additional luggage carousels were added on 12 March 2010 to accommodate the Airbus A380. Arrivals are accommodated on Level 1, with departures expanded on Level 3; Level 2 accommodates further retail and commercial activities. The Gautrain Rapid Rail Link station is above the terminal.

The new International Pier (cost: R535 million) has increased international arrivals and departures capacity in a two-storey structure with nine additional airside contact stands, four of which are Airbus A380 compatible. Air bridges are already in place and the existing duty-free mall will be extended into this area. Additional lounges and passenger-holding areas will be constructed on the upper level.

In March 2024, a capital investment plan was announced that shall encompass over $1 billion in several airports across South Africa. Significant upgrades to passenger and cargo facilities is touted for OR Tambo with a new cargo terminal and new passenger terminal to be developed second between the two runways, six additional bussing gates at the current terminal, and various other changes.

== Terminals ==
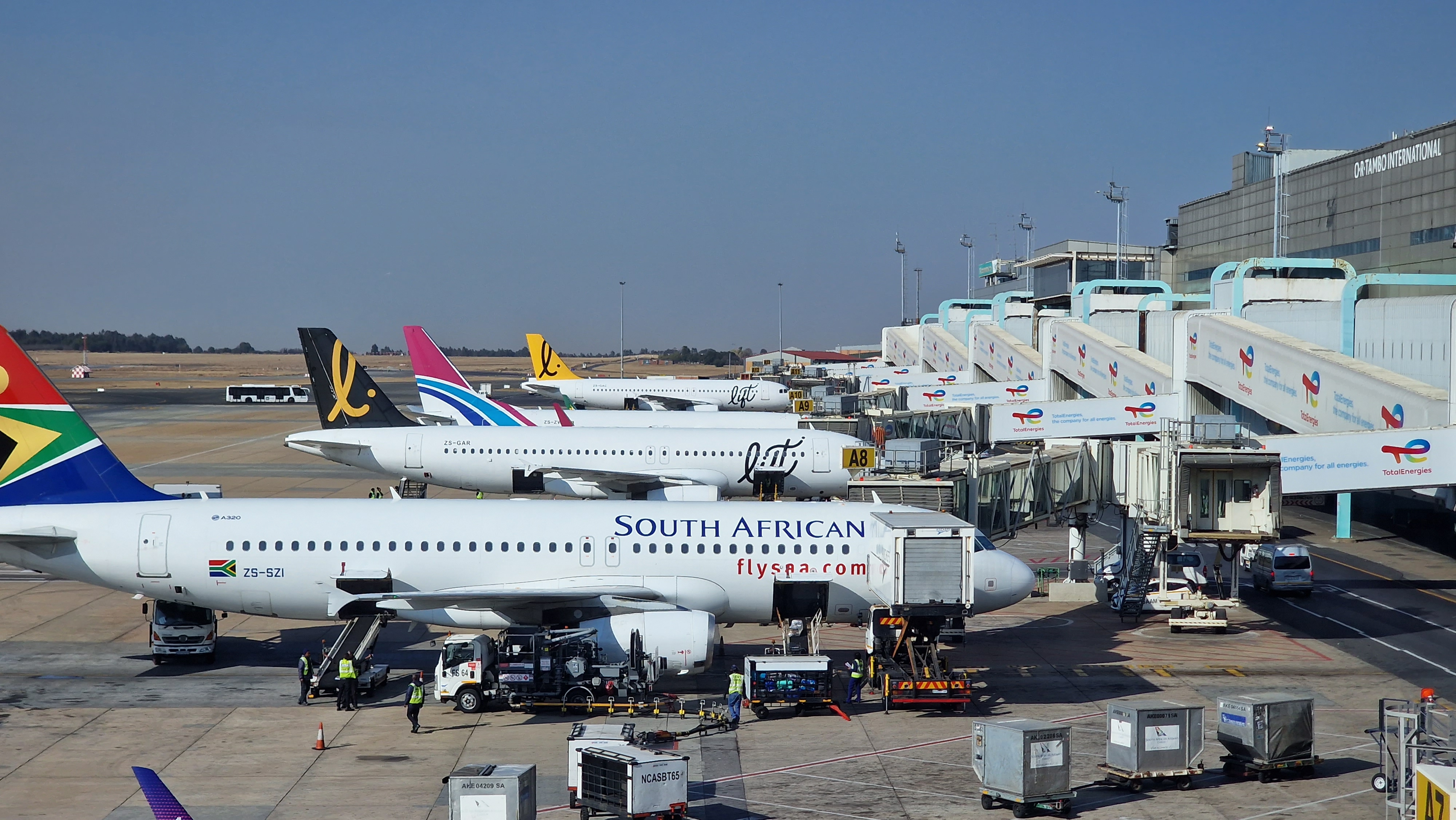
A number of different aircraft at the international terminal

There are six terminals at the airport, in three major areas: the international terminals; the domestic terminals; and the transit terminals. The transit terminal housed disused parts of the old domestic terminals. It has been mostly demolished to build a new Central Terminal that will provide an indoor link between domestic and international terminals, as well as a central passenger check-in area and more gates. It was constructed for the 2010 FIFA World Cup. Terminals A1 and A2 handle international passengers while the other two terminals handle domestic passengers. Due to the airport's design, departure and arrivals terminals are considered separate terminals. The Central Terminal that is under construction will be named Terminal A3 and it will be used for both international and domestic passengers.

The two terminals, Terminal A and Terminal B, have been restructured. Several airlines now use Terminal B for all check-ins, for both national and international flights. The airlines that use Terminal B include Air Cote D'Ivoire, RwandAir, South African Airways, Airlink, Lift-Airline, FlySafair, KLM, Air France, Ethiopian Airlines, Qantas and Air Mauritius.

The ample parking available at O. R. Tambo International Airport was revamped as part of the upgrades made prior to the 2010 World Cup with the introduction of state-of-the-art technology that allows visitors to identify available parking spaces easily.

== Airlines and destinations ==
=== Passenger ===
Airlines	Destinations
Air Algerie	Algiers, Luanda
Air Austral	Saint-Denis de la Réunion
Air Botswana	Francistown, Gaborone, Kasane, Maun
Air China	Beijing–Capital, Shenzhen
Air Congo	Kinshasa–N'djli
Air Côte d'Ivoire	Abidjan, Lagos
Air Europa	Madrid
Air France	Paris–Charles de Gaulle
Air Mauritius	Mauritius
Air Seychelles	Mahé, Victoria Falls
Air Tanzania	Dar es Salaam
Air Zimbabwe	Bulawayo, Harare
Airlink	Antananarivo, Beira, Blantyre, Bloemfontein, Bulawayo, Cape Town, Dar es Salaam, Durban, East London, Gaborone, George, Gqeberha, Harare, Hoedspruit, Kasane, Kimberley, Kinshasa–N'djili, Lilongwe, Livingstone, Luanda–Agostinho Neto, Lubumbashi, Lusaka, Manzini, Maputo, Maseru, Maun, Mbombela, Mthatha, Nacala, Nairobi–Jomo Kenyatta, Nampula, Ndola, Nelspruit, Nosy Be, Pemba, Phalaborwa, Pietermaritzburg, Polokwane, Richards Bay, Saint Helena, Sishen, Skukuza, Tete, Upington, Victoria Falls, Vilanculos, Walvis Bay, Windhoek–Hosea Kutako, Zanzibar
ASKY Airlines	Brazzaville, Douala, Kinshasa–N'djili, Lagos, Libreville, Lomé
British Airways	London–Heathrow
Cathay Pacific	Hong Kong
CemAir	Bloemfontein, Cape Town, Durban, East London, George, Gqeberha, Harare, Hoedspruit, Kasane, Kimberley, Lusaka, Maputo, Margate, Maun, Plettenberg Bay, Richards Bay (begins 1 November 2026), Victoria Falls
Condor	Frankfurt
Delta Air Lines	Atlanta
Egyptair	Cairo
Emirates	Dubai–International
Eswatini Air	Manzini
Ethiopian Airlines	Addis Ababa, Lilongwe
Etihad Airways	Abu Dhabi
Fastjet Zimbabwe	Bulawayo, Harare, Victoria Falls
FlyGabon	Libreville
FlySafair	Bloemfontein, Cape Town, Durban, East London, George, Gqeberha, Harare, Livingstone, Mauritius, Mbombela, Victoria Falls, Zanzibar
Kenya Airways	Nairobi–Jomo Kenyatta
KLM	Amsterdam
LAM Mozambique Airlines	Beira, Maputo, Nampula, Pemba, Tete, Vilanculos
LATAM Brasil	São Paulo–Guarulhos
LIFT	Cape Town, Durban
Lufthansa	Frankfurt, Munich
Malawi Airlines	Blantyre, Lilongwe
Proflight Zambia	Lusaka, Ndola
Qantas	Perth, Sydney–Kingsford Smith
Qatar Airways	Doha
Royal Zambian Airlines	Lusaka
RwandAir	Kigali, Lusaka
Singapore Airlines	Singapore
South African Airways	Abidjan, Accra, Cape Town, Dar es Salaam, Durban, Gaborone, Gqeberha, Harare, Kinshasa–N'djili, Lagos, Lubumbashi, Lusaka, Mauritius, Perth, São Paulo–Guarulhos, Victoria Falls, Windhoek–Hosea Kutako
Swiss International Air Lines	Zürich
TAAG Angola Airlines	Luanda–Agostinho Neto
Turkish Airlines	Istanbul
Uganda Airlines	Entebbe
United Airlines	Newark
Virgin Atlantic	London–Heathrow
Zambia Airways	Livingstone, Lusaka

=== Cargo ===
Airlines	Destinations	Refs
ASL Airlines Belgium	Nairobi–Jomo Kenyatta	
Astral Aviation	Dubai–Al Maktoum, Lusaka, Maputo, Nairobi–Jomo Kenyatta	
BidAir Cargo	Cape Town, Dar es Salaam, Durban, East London, George, Gqeberha, Harare, Kigali, Livingstone, Mauritius, Nairobi–Jomo Kenyatta, Victoria Falls, Windhoek–Hosea Kutako	
Cargolux	Luxembourg	
EgyptAir Cargo	Cairo	
Emirates SkyCargo	Dubai–Al Maktoum	
Ethiopian Airlines Cargo	Addis Ababa	
Etihad Cargo	Nairobi–Jomo Kenyatta	
FedEx Express	Dubai–International, Nairobi–Jomo Kenyatta	
Lufthansa Cargo	Frankfurt, Lagos, Nairobi–Jomo Kenyatta	
Magma Aviation	Colombo–Bandaranaike, Mauritius, Nairobi–Jomo Kenyatta	
Martinair	Amsterdam, Harare, Nairobi–Jomo Kenyatta	
Qatar Airways Cargo	Doha	
Saudia Cargo	Jeddah	
Singapore Airlines Cargo	Nairobi–Jomo Kenyatta, Singapore	
Turkish Cargo	Istanbul	
Uganda Air Cargo	Entebbe	

== Statistics ==
Annual passenger and aircraft statistics
Fiscal year (Apr–Mar)	Aircraft movements	Passenger traffic
2006–07	211,641	17,794,100
2007–08	229,042(▲8.2%)	19,457,498(▲9.3%)
2008–09	213,193(▼6.9%)	17,884,859(▼8.1%)
2009–10	202,532(▼5.0%)	17,596,203(▼1.6%)
2010–11	212,918(▲5.1%)	18,643,145(▲5.9%)
2011–12	212,570(▼0.2%)	19,003,542(▲1.9%)
2012–13	199,802(▼6.0%)	18,621,259(▼2.0%)
2013–14	206,603(▲3.4%)	18,820,988(▲1.0%)
2014–15	217,627(▲5.0%)	19,135,093(▲1.7%)
2015–16	224,191(▲3.0%)	20,374,998(▲6.5%)
2016–17	220,934(▼1.5%)	20,692,780(▲1.5%)
2017–18	220,644(▼0.1%)	21,231,510(▲2.6%)
2018–19	219,586(▼0.5%)	21,313,943(▲0.4%)
2019–20	211,879(▼3.5%)	20,903,566(▼1.9%)
2020–21	70,414(▼66.8%)	4,063,739(▼80.6%)
2021–22	140,105(▲99%)	9,633,154(▲81.3%)
2022–23	181,527(▲29.6%)	15,622,216(▲62.2%)
2023–24	204,309(▲12.6%)	17,852,569(▲13.2%)
2024–25	201,208(▼1.5%)	18,533,673(▲3.8%)
2025–26	212,075(▲5.4%)	20,083,399(▲8.4%)
Source: ACSA

== Other buildings ==
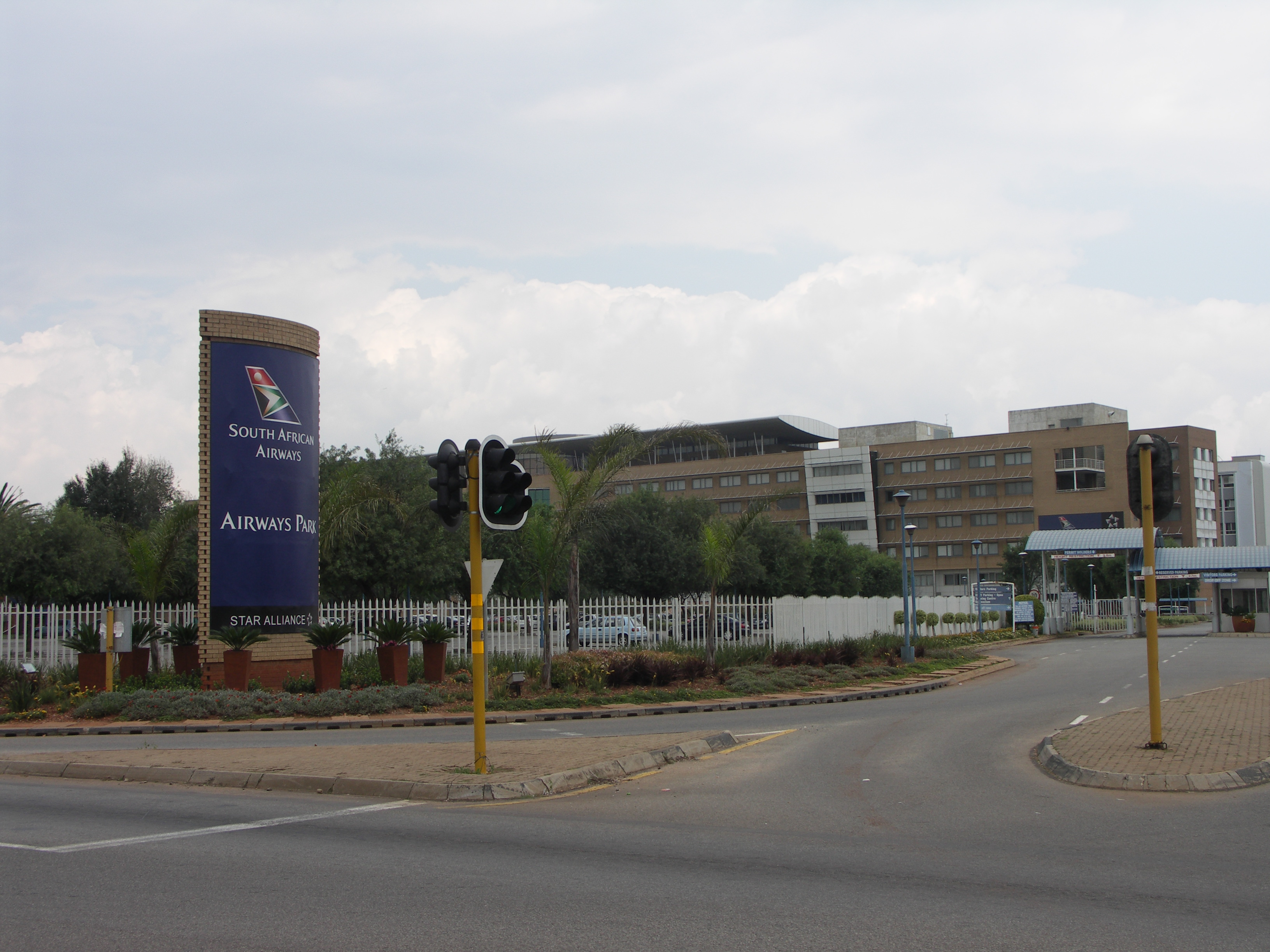
Airways Park, the head office of South African Airways

South African Airways is headquartered in Airways Park on the grounds of O. R. Tambo International Airport. The building was developed by Stauch Vorster Architects. Airways Park was completed in March 1997 for R70 Million ($17.5 Million). The fourth floor of the West Wing of the Pier Development of O. R. Tambo was also the head office of South African Express until it ceased operating in 2020.

== Ground transport ==
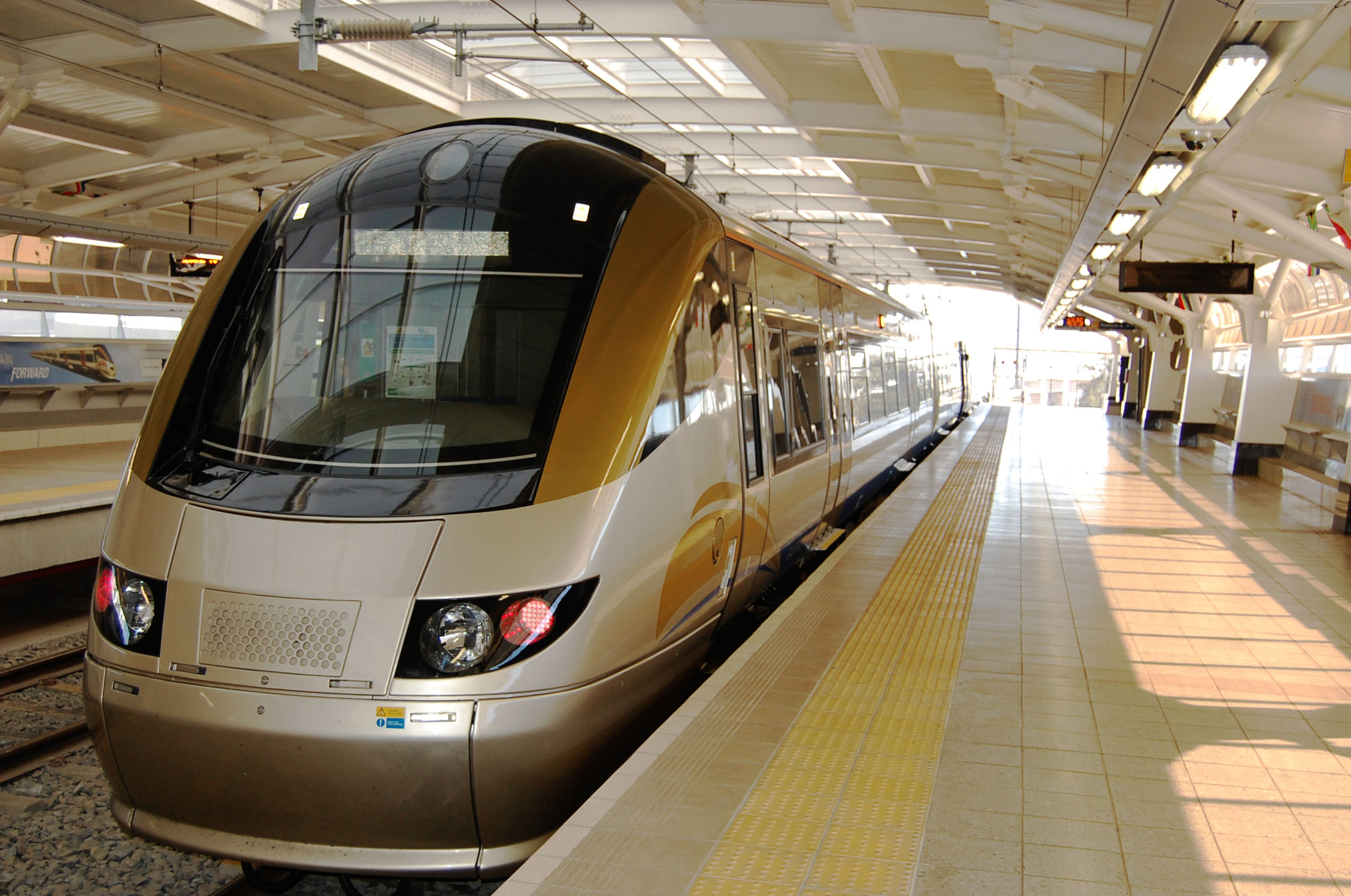
Gautrain at O. R. Tambo International Airport, with direct pedestrian link to the terminal

=== Rail transit ===
The Gautrain, a modern regional express rail system, serves the airport thanks to its station located directly in the terminal. It links the airport with Sandton, a major business district and a primary tourist area, and, from there, the rest of the Gautrain system. The Gautrain is generally praised for its safety and overall efficiency.

=== Car ===
The airport is easily accessible by car and it is located 20 kilometres northeast of Johannesburg Central at the eastern end of the R24 Airport Freeway. It can be accessed by the R24 Airport Freeway (also known as the Albertina Sisulu Freeway) from Johannesburg Central to the west and the R21 highway from Pretoria to the north and the central part of the East Rand to the south. The R24 intersects with the R21 near the airport and with the O. R. Tambo Airport Highway. This highway goes through the airport terminals, separating them from the parking bays, but it branches off into two directions: "departures" and "arrivals", and then it re-branches into the intersection.

=== Bus ===
Five bus city lines, operated by Metrobus and Putco, pass through the airport twice a day. The buses are accessible in the morning and the evening, when there are many passengers departing and arriving. There are also private bus lines operating express buses to the CBD of Johannesburg, as well as other locations.

== Accidents and incidents ==
- 20 October 1957 – A Vickers Viscount G-AOYF, operated by Vickers on a test flight, was damaged beyond economic repair when the starboard undercarriage collapsed following a heavy landing.
- 22 September 1972 – A Beech 18 operated by United Air (not to be confused with United Airlines of the United States or United Airways of Bangladesh) crashed 12 km (7.4m) N of JNB while attempting to land back at Johannesburg. All 3 occupants on board were killed along with two persons on the ground.
- 1 March 1988 – A Comair Embraer EMB 110 Bandeirante ZS-LGP operating Flight 206, exploded in mid-air whilst on final approach. All seventeen occupants were killed. A passenger was suspected of detonating an explosive device but to this day it has never been proven.
- 22 April 1999 – Boeing 727 ZS-IJE was damaged beyond repair by large hailstones while on approach for landing. The aircraft landed safely with no loss of life.
- 3 November 2001 – A Reims-Cessna F406 crashed shortly after takeoff from runway 03R, killing all three occupants. The aircraft did not have a valid certificate of airworthiness at the time of the incident.
- 9 April 2004 – An Emirates Airbus A340-300 A6-ERN operating flight EK764 from Johannesburg to Dubai sustained serious damage during takeoff when it failed to become airborne before the end of the runway, striking 25 approach lights, causing four tyres to burst which in turn threw debris into various parts of the aircraft, ultimately damaging the flap drive mechanism. This rendered the flaps immoveable in the takeoff position. The aircraft returned for an emergency landing during which the normal braking system failed as a result of the damage. The aircraft was brought to a stop only 250 metres from the end of the 3,400-metre runway using reverse thrust and the alternate braking system. In their report, South African investigators found that the captain had used an erroneous take-off technique, and criticised Emirates training and rostering practices. This incident was similar to an incident which happened at Melbourne airport in 2009.
- 22 December 2013 – A British Airways Boeing 747-400 G-BNLL operating flight BA33 collided with a building at the airport. Four ground-handling staff in the building sustained minor injuries. The airplane was written off and scrapped by April 2015.
- 26 October 2015 – A British Airways operated by Comair Boeing 737-400 ZS-OAA operating flight BA6234 from Port Elizabeth suffered a gear collapse while landing at the airport. There were no injuries.
- 12 November 2022 – A South African Airways Airbus A320 (ZS-SZJ) being towed collided with a parked FlySafair Boeing 737-8BG (ZS-SJH) at O. R. Tambo International Airport. No passengers were on board either aircraft at the time. The FlySafair's empennage section and SAA wing tip were damaged. As a result, both aircraft were rendered inoperable.

== See also ==
- List of airports in South Africa
- List of South African airports by passenger movements
