= Royal Zambian Airlines =

Zambian airline

Royal Zambian AIrlines
IATA	ICAO	Call sign
3Q	n/a	n/a
- Hubs: Kenneth Kaunda International Airport
- Fleet size: 3
- Destinations: 2
- Parent company: Royal Air Charters
- Headquarters: Lusaka, Zambia
- Website: https://royalzambianairlines.com/

Royal Zambian Airlines is a regional airline in Zambia based at Kenneth Kaunda International Airport and a subsidiary of Royal Air Charters, a charter company based in Lusaka, Zambia. The airline serves as a link between Zambia and its neighboring countries aiming at bringing in business and tourist travelers.

Royal Zambian Airlines has a hangar at Kenneth Kaunda International Airport where it stores its three aircraft.

== History ==
Royal Zambian Airlines was founded in May 2020 and commenced operations on December 17, 2020, with a flight to Johannesburg. The airline started by operating just one Embraer Erj-145LR on a scheduled service to Johannesburg from their main operating base in Lusaka along with two other Embraer aircraft in storage.

Its parent company, Royal Air Charters, first started operating in 2007 and has stayed afloat since then.

== Destinations ==
As of December 2020, Royal Zambian Airlines operated these following destinations:

Royal Zambian Destinations
Country	City	Airport	Notes	Refs
South Africa	Johannesburg	O. R. Tambo International Airport		
Zambia	Lusaka	Kenneth Kaunda International Airport	Base	

== Fleet ==
As of December 2020, Royal Zambian Airlines operated these following aircraft:

Royal Zambian Fleet
Aircraft	In service	Orders	Passengers	Notes
Embraer EMB 120ER	2	0	30	Operated with Royal Air Charters
Embraer ERJ 145LR	1	0	50	Utilized on the Lusaka-Johannesburg flight
Total	3	0		
