= Zamba (name) =

Zamba is both a given name and a surname. Notable people with the name include:

- Zamba (1954-1977); animal actor best known as MGM trademark Leo the Lion (from 1957 to the present); also appeared in movies such as King of Kings (1961), The Lion (1962), Zebra in the Kitchen (1965), Fluffy (1965), and Napoleon and Samantha (1972); as well as the Tarzan TV series starring Ron Ely and a 1966 commercial for Dreyfus Investments.
- Zamba Zembola, author of an 1847 slave narrative, The Life and Adventures of Zamba, an African Negro King; and his Experience of Slavery in South Carolina
- Ermelinda Zamba (born 1981), Mozambican swimmer
- Frieda Zamba (born 1965), American surfer
- GNL Zamba (born 1986), Ugandan hip hop artist
