= Kenneth Kaunda International Airport =

International airport serving Lusaka, Zambia

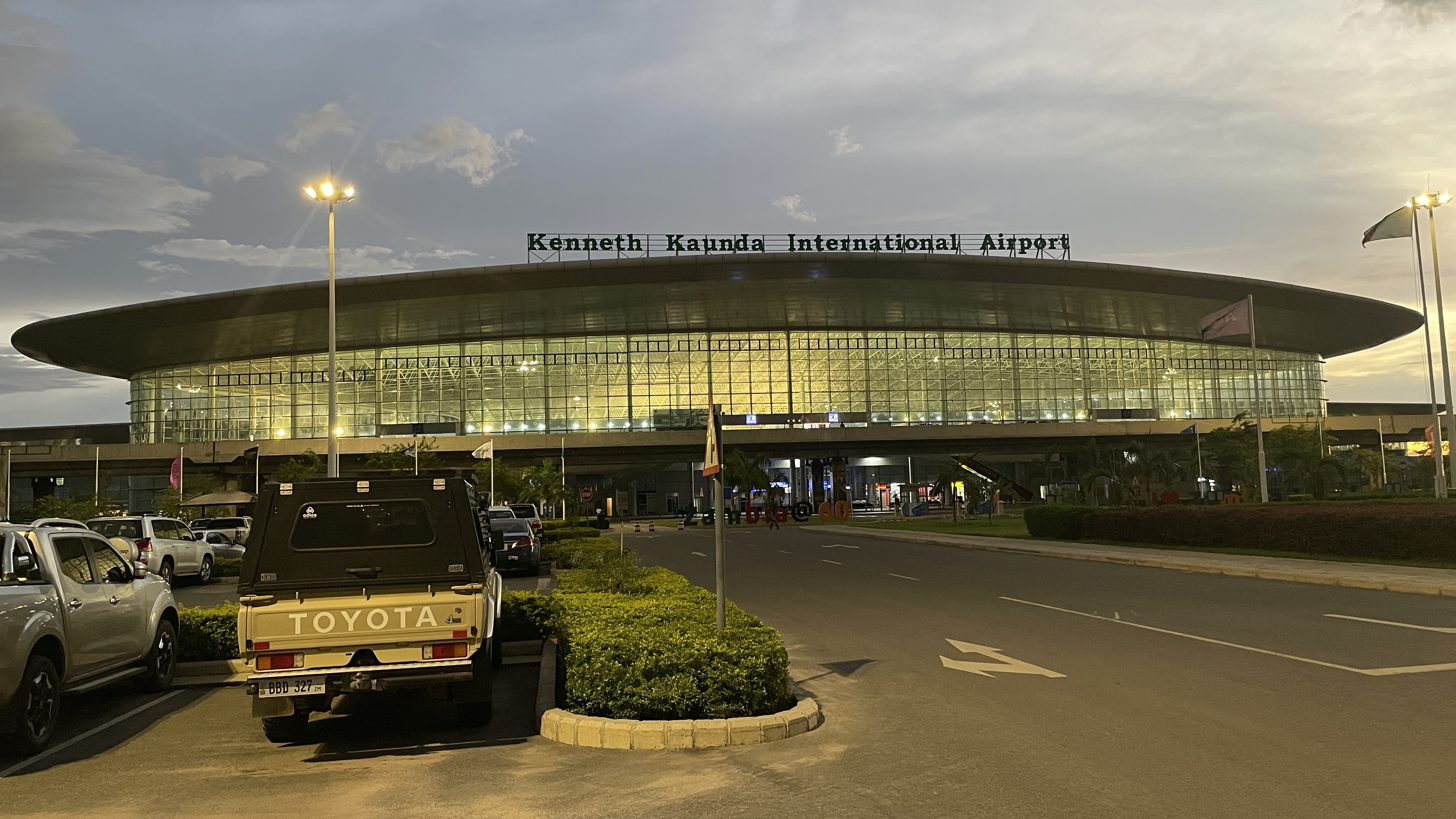
- Terminal Two in 2025
- IATA: LUN; ICAO: FLKK

Summary
- Airport type: Public
- Owner: Government of Zambia
- Operator: Zambia Airports Corporation Limited
- Serves: Lusaka, Zambia
- Location: Chongwe District
- Opened: 1967
- Hub for: Zambia Airways; Proflight Zambia
- Built: 2015–2020
- Elevation AMSL: 1,152 m (3,780 ft)
- Coordinates: 15°19′54″S 28°26′03″E
- Website: zacl.co.zm

Maps
- Location of the airport in Zambia
- Interactive map of Kenneth Kaunda; International Airport

Runways
Direction	Length		Surface
Direction	m	ft	Surface
10/28	3,962	12,999	Asphalt
15/33	823	2,700	Grass

Statistics (2025)
- Passengers: ▲1,795,801
- Source: ZACL GCM

Kenneth Kaunda International Airport (IATA: LUN, ICAO: FLKK) is an international airport located in Chongwe District, off the Great East Road, approximately 27 kilometres (17 mi) northeast of the city centre of Lusaka, the capital and largest city of Zambia. The airport has a capacity of 6 million and is the largest in Zambia, serving as a hub for its region. The airport serves as a hub for Zambia Airways, Proflight Zambia, Royal Zambian Airlines, and Mahogany Air.

The airport opened in 1967 as Lusaka International Airport. It was renamed in 2011 in honour of Kenneth Kaunda (1924–2021), the nation's first president.

== History ==
In 2015, the government of Zambia began a three-year, US$360 million expansion and improvement of the airport, with funds borrowed from the Exim Bank of China. The work, contracted to China Jiangxi International, involves construction of a new "two-story terminal building, 22 check-in counters, 12 border channels and six security check counters; a presidential terminal, a new air traffic control building and tower and a new hotel". The new terminal was expected to open in 2019. Construction was substantially complete by late January 2020. The new terminal was officially opened 5 August 2021. All international flights use the new terminal, called Terminal Two, while domestic flights use the original terminal, Terminal One.

== Facilities ==
=== Terminals ===
Kenneth Kaunda International Airport has two terminals. Terminal One has no jet bridges and is used for domestic traffic. Terminal Two, opened in August 2021, has six gates and handles all international flights.

=== Ground transportation ===
Taxis are the most common form of transport to and from the city, as it is a 15 to 20-minute ride to the city centre. There are also 2 car rental companies at the airport, Avis and Europcar, but most hotels in Lusaka have shuttle services into the airport. A bus line also goes between the airport and the Chelston bus station, but the buses do not run on a regular schedule.

== Airlines and destinations ==
=== Passenger ===
Airlines	Destinations
Air Botswana	Gaborone
Air Tanzania	Dar es Salaam
Airlink	Johannesburg–O. R. Tambo
Emirates	Dubai–International, Harare
Ethiopian Airlines	Addis Ababa
Fastjet Zimbabwe	Harare
Kenya Airways	Harare, Nairobi–Jomo Kenyatta
Malawi Airlines	Harare, Lilongwe
Proflight Zambia	Cape Town,^{a} Johannesburg–O. R. Tambo, Kasama, Lilongwe, Livingstone, Mansa, Mfuwe, Ndola, Solwezi, Windhoek–Hosea Kutako
Qatar Airways	Doha, Harare
RwandAir	Johannesburg–O. R. Tambo, Kigali
South African Airways	Johannesburg–O. R. Tambo
Uganda Airlines	Entebbe,^{b}
Zambia Airways	Dar es Salaam, Harare, Johannesburg–O. R. Tambo, Livingstone, Mfuwe, Nairobi–Jomo Kenyatta, Ndola

Notes

- ^a This flight operates via Livingstone in both directions on the same flight number.
- ^b This flight operates via Harare or continues to Harare on the same flight number. However, the carrier does not have rights to transport passengers solely between Lusaka and Harare or viceversa.
- ^c This flight operates via Dar es Salaam in both directions on the same flight number. However, the carrier does not have rights to transport passengers solely between Lusaka and Dar es Salaam or viceversa.

=== Cargo ===
Airlines	Destinations
Astral Aviation	Johannesburg–O. R. Tambo, Nairobi–Jomo Kenyatta
Kenya Airways	Nairobi–Jomo Kenyatta
Magma Aviation	Liège
Martinair	Amsterdam

== Statistics ==
After a significant drop due to the COVID-19 pandemic in 2020 and the opening of the new terminal in 2021, the airport surpassed its pre-pandemic level of passenger traffic in 2023 for the first time. Overall, the airport accounts for 71% of all passenger airport traffic in Zambia in 2025.

Annual passenger statistics
Year	Passengers
2013	1,064,950
2014	1,127,705
2015	1,147,422
2016	1,147,422
2017	1,224,163
2018	1,355,700
2019	1,289,801
2020	404,000(approx.)
2021	565,179
2022	1,234,083
2023	1,523,919
2024	1,680,995
2025	1,795,801
Source: ZACL

== Accidents and incidents ==
- On 26 August 1969, a Zambian Air Force Hawker Siddeley HS-748 lost control and crashed during takeoff. Three of the four occupants died.
- On 22 December 1974, a Canadair CL-44D4 operated by Tradewinds Airways caught fire after its nose gear collapsed during a hard landing. The fire was quickly extinguished and all of the occupants survived.
- On 14 May 1977, a Dan-Air Services/IAS Cargo Boeing 707 crashed after the right elevator and horizontal stabilizer separated during approach. The separation was caused by metal fatigue. All six occupants died.
- On 17 February 1990, a Zambian Air Force de Havilland Canada DHC-5D crashed into a field during approach. All 29 people on board died. This crash remains the worst aviation accident in Zambian History.
- On 1 March 2000, a South African Airways Airbus A320's right landing gear collapsed after it skidded off the runway during a landing in a storm.

== See also ==
- Transport in Zambia
- List of airports in Zambia
