= Zambia Airways =

Zambian flag carrier

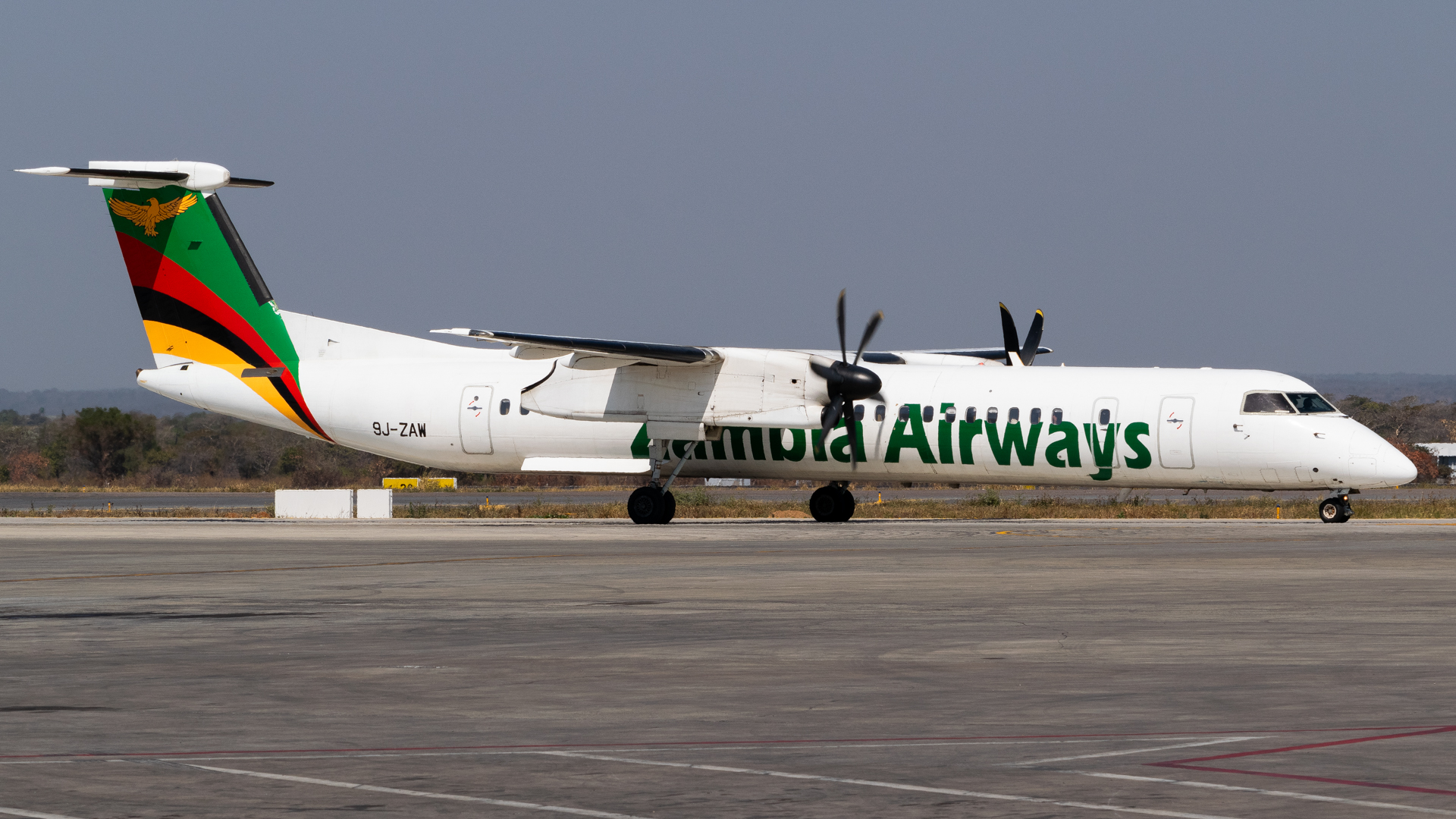
- Dash 8 Q400 of Zambia Airways
IATA	ICAO	Call sign
ZN	AZB	AIR ZAMBIA
- Founded: April 1964 (original); August 19, 2018 (revival)
- Commenced operations: December 2021
- Hubs: Kenneth Kaunda International Airport
- Fleet size: 2
- Destinations: 5
- Parent company: Zambian Industrial Development Corporation
- Headquarters: Lusaka, Zambia
- Key people: Thomas Gebreyohannes, CEO
- Website: www.zambia-airways.com

Zambia Airways is the flag carrier of the Republic of Zambia. The airline is based in Lusaka, Zambia with its hub at Kenneth Kaunda International Airport.

Originally, the airline was founded in April 1964. It was liquidated by the government in December 1994 due to political issues but revived again with the help of Ethiopian Airlines and the Zambian Industrial Development Corporation on December 1, 2021. The government took a 55% stake in the newly relaunched Zambia Airways with Ethiopian Airlines owning the remaining 45% of the shares. Ethiopian has planned to set up hubs all around the continent in a 15-year plan called Vision 2025 that will see it become the leading aviation group in Africa.

== History ==
=== Zambia Airways (1964–1967) ===
On 1 January 1964, a reconstitution of Central African Airways (CAA) as the national airline of Southern Rhodesia, Zambia and Malawi led to the creation of three new national carriers, all of them wholly owned subsidiaries of CAA. Each of these airlines were relative autonomous but relied upon CAA's technical, managerial and financial assistance. Zambia Airways was established in April 1964. T. M. D. Mtine and R. P. Hartley were appointed as Zambia Airways' first chairman and general manager, respectively. Two Douglas DC-3s and three de Havilland Canada DHC-2 Beavers three were transferred from CAA. The Beavers were intended to operate on domestic services under the premise that the revenue generated by these services would stay with the airline. On the other hand, the DC-3s would operate transborder flights. Operations started on 1 July 1964 serving the Salisbury–Kariba–Lusaka–Ndola–Kitwe run. In November of the same year, the Ndola–Elisabethville service, previously flown by CAA, was launched on a weekly basis. The domestic routes were generally unprofitable and they were supported by the profits generated with CAA's international operations.

In 1967, Alitalia was selected to run the airline after Zambia Airways's splitting from CAA later that year. Pan African Air Services and Flying Tiger Line also participated as bidders for the management contract. In July, a new airport was inaugurated in Lusaka. The same year, CAA was dissolved within months, and CAA's former subsidiary Zambia Airways became the state-owned national airline on 1 September 1967.

=== Zambia Airways Corporation (1967–1994) ===
On 1 September 1967, following the Zambia Airways Act, which appointed the carrier to operate both domestically and internationally after the collapse of CAA, Zambia Airways Corporation was formed in order to take over Zambia Airways, the former CAA's subsidiary. Technical and management assistance was provided by Alitalia. The first general manager was Franceso Casale. Two BAC One-Eleven 400s that were originally ordered by CAA were delivered late in the year. Operations started on 1 January 1968 using BAC One-Eleven 400 aircraft and serving Kenya, Malawi, Tanzania and Zaire on the Lusaka–Ndola–Nairobi, which also called at Kinshasa, Blantyre, and Livingstone. A Douglas DC-8-43, on wet-lease from Alitalia, permitted the carrier to start, in November 1968, a service from Lusaka to London with intermediate stops at Nairobi and Rome. The introduction of this route doubled the length of Zambia Airways' network to 12,000 miles (19,000 km). Mauritius was first served in November 1969.

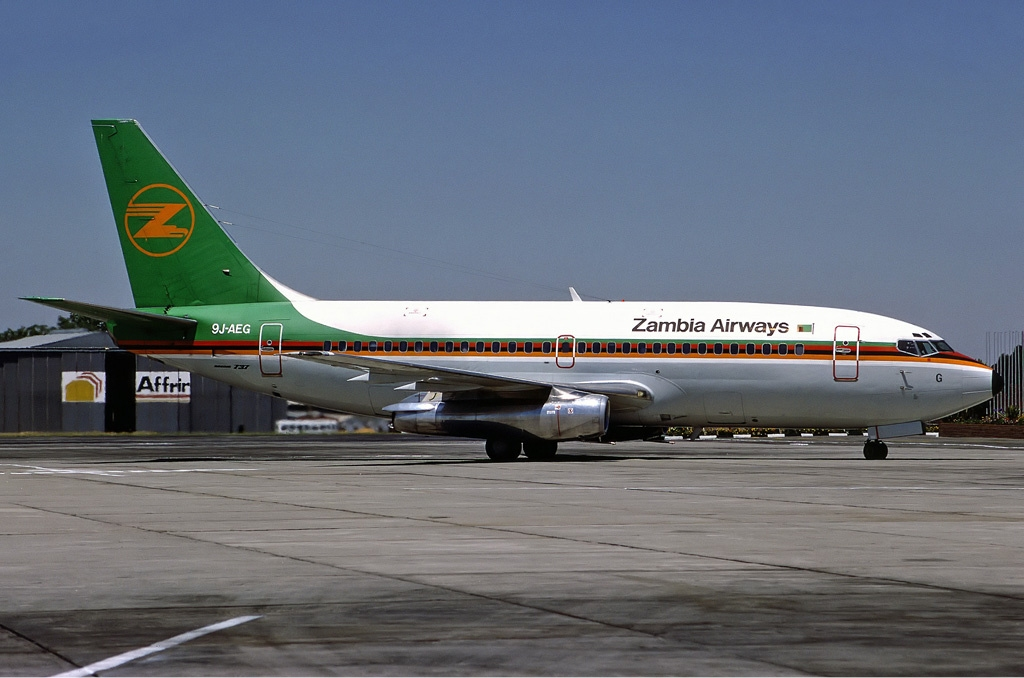
A Zambia Airways Boeing 737-200 Advanced at Harare International Airport in 1992. This particular aircraft, 9J-AEG, was delivered new to the airline in 1976.

February 1970 saw the upgauge of frequencies to London, with a second flight operated along the Lusaka–Nairobi–London run. Two HS-748s and a Douglas DC-8-43 from Alitalia were added to the fleet. The HS-748 came to replace four DC-3s the company had deployed on domestic routes. A charter subsidiary named National Air Charter Zambia (NACZ) was formed in 1974; operations began in March the same year using a leased Canadair CL-44. Also in 1974, the first Boeing 707-320C joined the fleet. Two more Boeing 707s were purchased from Aer Lingus and Pan Am in early 1975. Another Boeing 707-320C was acquired from the Aer Lingus on 24 March 1975. By this time, the contract with Alitalia was cancelled and a similar one was signed with Aer Lingus. The introduction of the Boeing 707 enabled the airline to launch direct services from Lusaka to London and Frankfurt in April 1975 and July 1976, respectively. By late 1976, the DC-8s were replaced with Boeing 707s. In early 1975, the two BAC One-Eleven 200s were sold to Dan-Air. Prior to ordering a Boeing 737-200 Advanced directly from the aircraft manufacturer in June 1975, a Boeing 737 had been wet-leased from Aer Lingus. The ordered 737 was intended as a replacement for the wet-leased aircraft; it entered service in late June 1976. On 14 May 1977, a Boeing 707 was involved in an accident with fatalities near Lusaka.

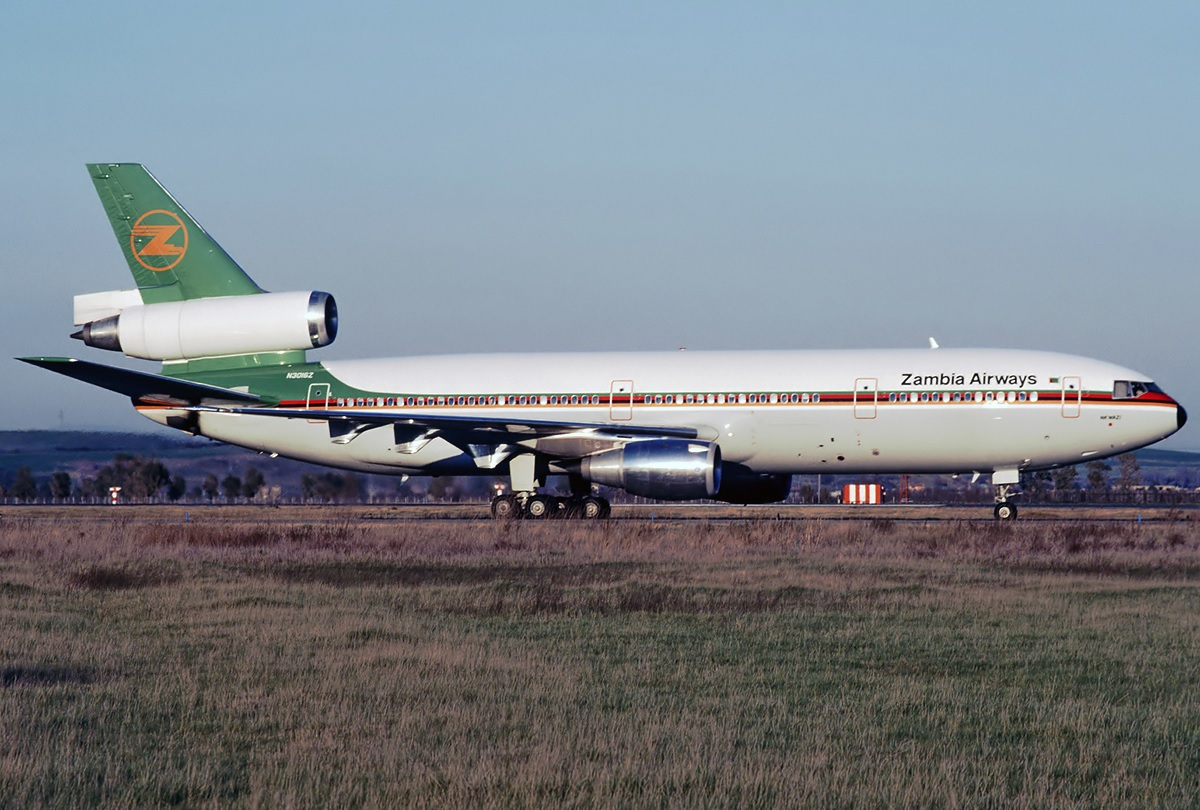
A Zambia Airways McDonnell Douglas DC-10-30 at Leonardo da Vinci–Fiumicino Airport in 1989.

The contract for managerial and technical assistance with Aer Lingus ended in March 1982, when a three-year agreement for the provision of operational and technical expertise was signed with Ethiopian Airlines. After reorganisation, Zambia Airways became a subsidiary of the government-owned Zambian Industrial and Mining Corporation in April 1982. A Boeing 727-200 was added to the fleet in 1983. On 4 July 1983, an HS-748, 9J-ADM, was involved in an accident in Kasaba with no serious injuries to the 46 people aboard. Zambia Airways became the sixth African customer for the DC-10 when an order for a 203-seater aircraft was placed in the first quarter of 1984. On 31 July 1984, the airline accepted the DC-10. The wide-bodied trijet was deployed on the European corridor. Simultaneously, the Mauritius service was extended to Bombay in cooperation with Air India. At March 1985, Patrick Chisanga held the chairman position and the number of employees was 1,666. At this time, the airline undertook scheduled passenger and cargo services radiating from Lusaka to a number of domestic points and to Bombay, Dar-es-Salaam, Harare, Johannesburg, Larnaca, London, Mauritius, Nairobi and Rome with a fleet of one DC-10-30, four Boeing 707-320Cs, one Boeing 737-200 and two HS-748s. In December 1985, two Boeing 707-320Cs were transferred to NACZ.

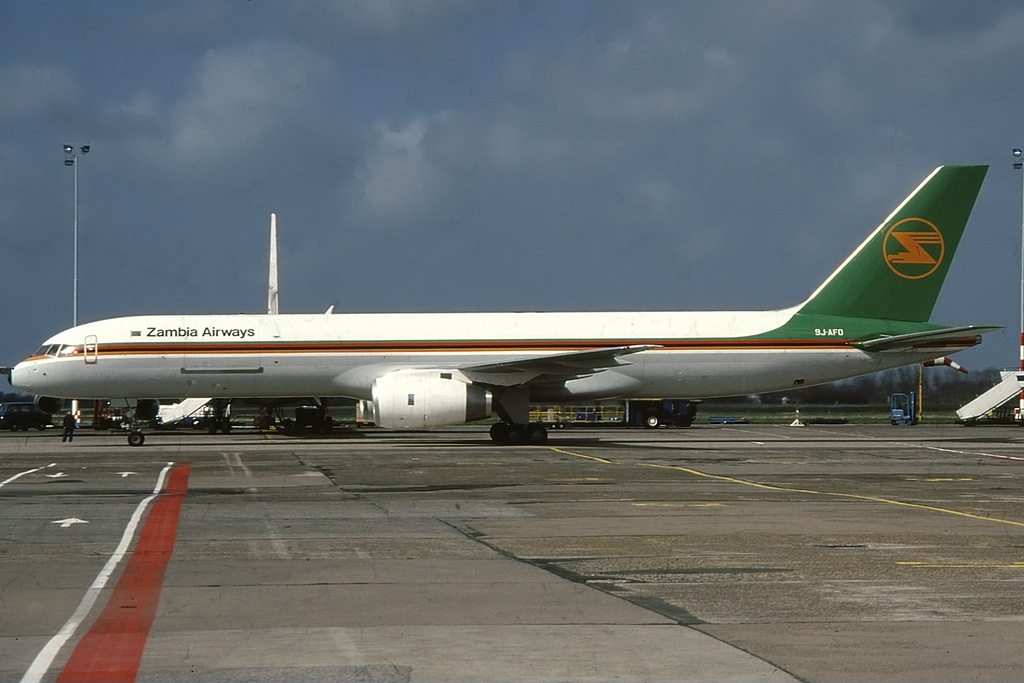
The airline's sole Boeing 757 freighter at Amsterdam Airport Schiphol in 1991. This aircraft was destroyed in a mid-air collision in 2002 while operating with another airline.

Aimed at returning the carrier to profitability, Lufthansa was hired in January 1986 to carry out a study over the performance of the technical and operational departments. In September the same year, Godfrey M. Mulundika was appointed as managing director. Two ATR-42s were ordered in 1987. In April 1988, the company launched flights to New York via Monrovia on the DC-10. The service grew popular with South Africans, who travelled from Johannesburg to Lusaka on a Zambia Airways or South African Airways flight. This journey was the quickest route from South Africa to the United States; because of apartheid, the US had prohibited direct flights between the countries in 1986. While the Zambian government also opposed apartheid, the country was facing economic hardship and needed the money that Zambia Airways was earning from the route. A lounge was constructed in the Lusaka airport for the passengers changing planes.

The ATR-42s entered the fleet during the summer of 1988, and came to replace the HS-748s on domestic and regional routes. Later on, one of these brand new ATR-42s was damaged while landing, but nobody was seriously injured. An MD-11 was ordered in 1989 for delivery in January 1992. In March 1990, the chairman position was held by Michael S. Mulenga, and the number of employees was 2,134. At this time, the carrier's network included domestic points along with Bombay (Mumbai), Dar-es-Salaam, Entebbe, Frankfurt, Gaborone, Harare, Jeddah, London, Manzini, Nairobi, New York and Rome. The fleet consisted of two ATR-42-300s, two Boeing 737-200s, one DC-8-71 and one McDonnell Douglas DC-10-30. A Boeing 757 freighter leased from Ansett Worldwide Aviation made Zambia Airways the second non-American carrier, after Ethiopian Airlines, in operating the type.

The Gulf War and the easing of sanctions on South Africa caused financial difficulties for the airline. In March 1991, Zambia Airways suspended its service to New York, which then operated via Banjul. By that month, it had also closed its offices in New York and Tokyo and dropped plans to fly to Bangkok. Cost-cutting measures resulted in the dismissal of a number of employees as well. Services to Lubumbashi were re-introduced in 1992 after the war forced their suspension. Zambia Airways went out of business in December 1994. Mounting debts and losses forced the government to put the carrier into liquidation that month.

=== Zambia Airways (2021-present) ===
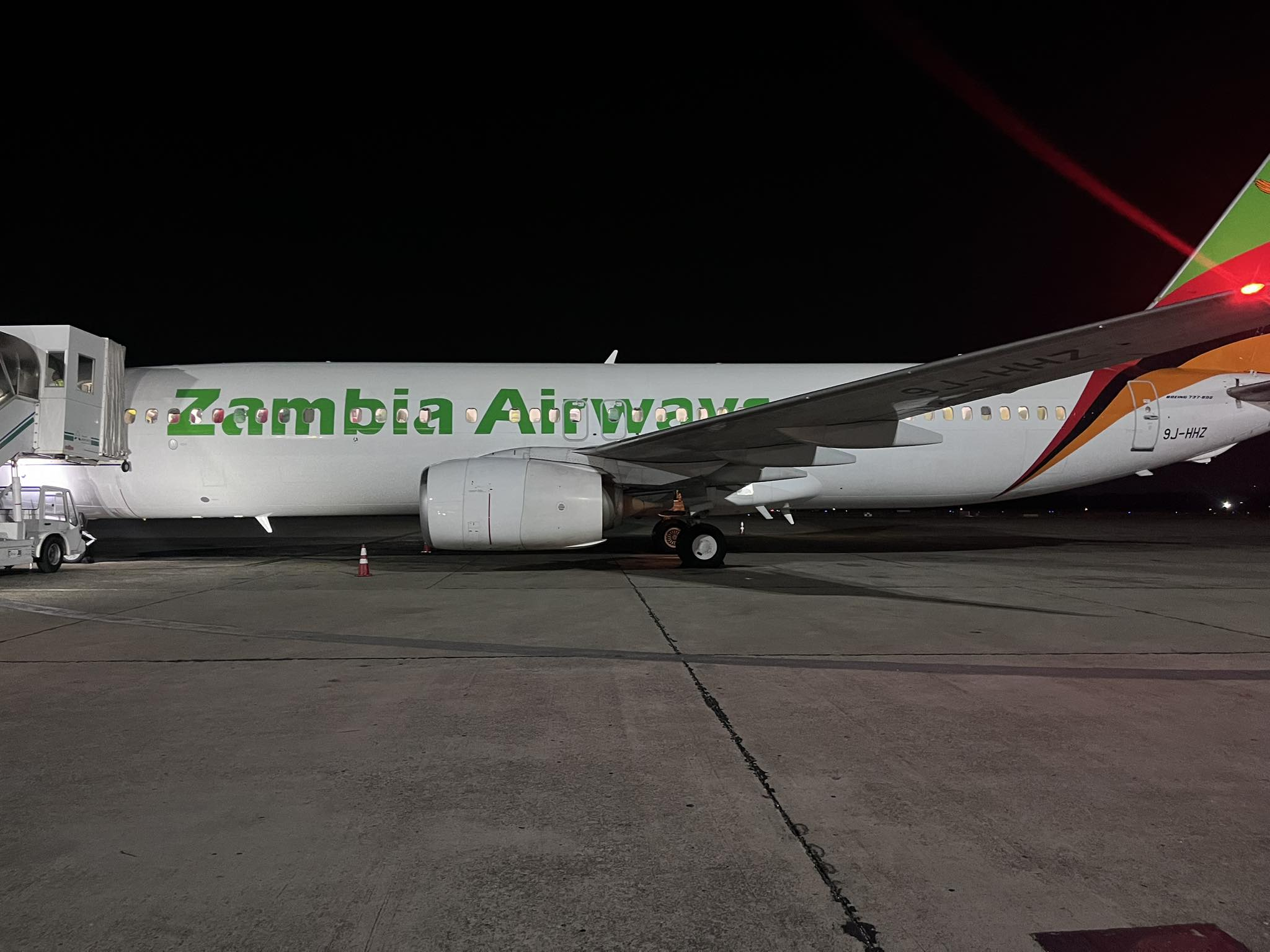
Boeing 737 of Zambia Airways

On October 24, 2018, the Republic of Zambia was bound to relaunch the old national airline, Zambia Airways, however the airline did not get off the ground until December 1, 2021 due to long delays by the government and the COVID-19 pandemic. On 20 August 2018, Ethiopian Airlines signed a definitive agreement with the Zambian Industrial Development Corporation (IDC), to acquire 45 percent shareholding in the revived air carrier for US$30 million. The plan is to start with local and regional routes and expand to intercontinental routes later. The revamped airline plans to operate 12 planes by 2028. However in early 2019, the relaunch was delayed a second time as the airline's new board of directors had not met. On 8 August 2019 the government of Zambia delayed the relaunch of the airline again after Zambia's Centre for Trade Policy and Development (CTPD) sent a message stating that the airline should not be relaunched until Zambia was in a better economical state. The airline, in partnership with Ethiopian Airlines, sent 25 flight attendants on 18 September 2019 to the Ethiopian Aviation Academy for a three-month training program. In addition, Zambia Airways' CEO Bruk Endeshaw stated that the airline will help grow the economy of Zambia and bring back the Zambian aviation industry back to its glory days.

== Destinations ==
As of December 2021, Zambia Airways operated to the following destinations:

Country	City	Airport	Notes	Refs
Kenya	Nairobi	Jomo Kenyatta International Airport		
South Africa	Johannesburg	O. R. Tambo International Airport		
Tanzania	Dar es Salaam	Julius Nyerere International Airport		
Zambia	Livingstone	Harry Mwanga Nkumbula International Airport		
Zambia	Lusaka	Kenneth Kaunda International Airport	Hub	
Zambia	Mfuwe	Mfuwe Airport		
Zambia	Ndola	Simon Mwansa Kapwepwe International Airport		
Zambia	Solwezi	Solwezi Airport		
Zimbabwe	Harare	Robert Gabriel Mugabe International Airport		

=== Codeshare agreements ===
- Ethiopian Airlines

== Fleet ==
=== Historical fleet ===
Note: in approximate date order - earliest to latest.

- Douglas DC-3
- de Havilland Canada DHC-2 Beaver
- BAC 1-11-400 (Flight International identifies these as Series 200, Guttery as Series 400)
- Douglas DC-8-43
- Hawker Siddeley HS 748
- Boeing 707-320C
- Boeing 737-200
- Boeing 727-200
- McDonnell Douglas DC-10-30
- Douglas DC-8-71
- ATR 42-300
- Boeing 737-800

== Bibliography ==
- Guttery, Ben R. (1998). Encyclopedia of African Airlines. Jefferson, North Carolina: Mc Farland & Company, Inc. ISBN 978-0-7864-0495-7.
