= Air Zimbabwe =

Flag carrier airline of Zimbabwe

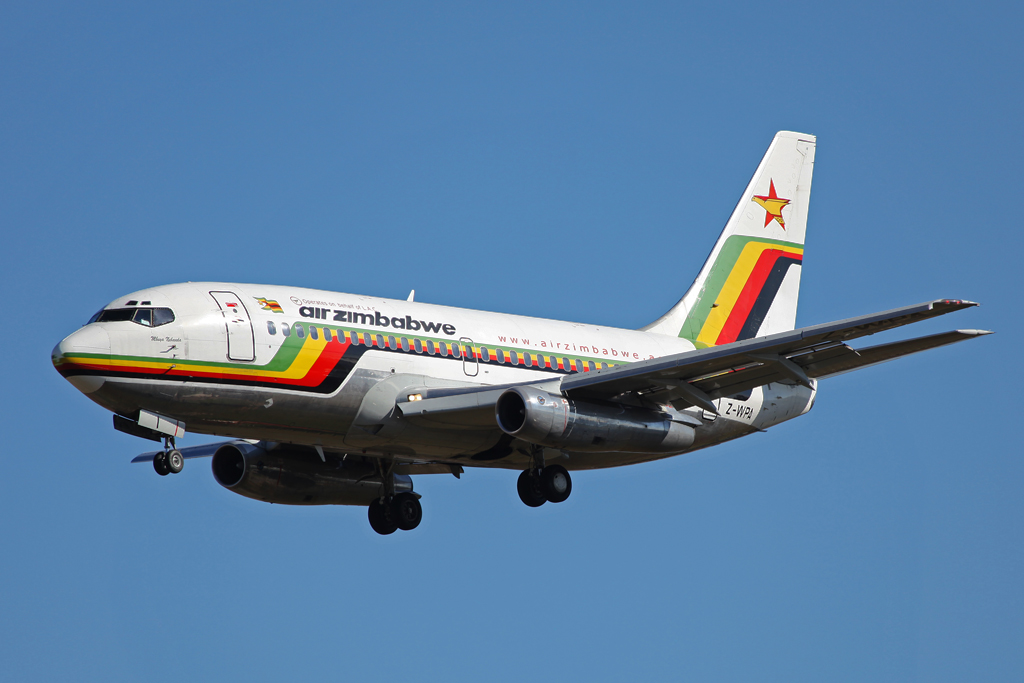
IATA	ICAO	Call sign
UM	AZW	AIR ZIMBABWE
- Founded: 1 September 1967; 59 years ago (as Air Rhodesia Corporation)
- Commenced operations: 2 April 1980; 46 years ago
- Hubs: Robert Gabriel Mugabe International Airport
- Frequent-flyer program: Rainbow Club
- Fleet size: 2
- Destinations: 4
- Parent company: Air Zimbabwe (Private) Limited
- Headquarters: Robert Gabriel Mugabe International Airport Harare, Zimbabwe
- Key people: Joseph Makonise (Acting CEO)
- Website: airzimbabwe.aero

Air Zimbabwe (Pvt) Ltd (operating as Air Zimbabwe) is the flag carrier airline of Zimbabwe, headquartered on the property of Robert Gabriel Mugabe International Airport, in Harare. From its hub at Robert Gabriel Mugabe International Airport, the carrier used to operate a network within southern Africa that also included Asia and London-Gatwick. Following financial difficulties, Air Zimbabwe ceased operations in late February 2012. Serving a reduced domestic network, the carrier resumed operations for a short period between May and early July 2012, when flights were again discontinued. Some flights were restarted on a discontinuous basis in November that year. The airline resumed operating some domestic routes as well as the regional service to Johannesburg on a daily basis in April 2013.

The company has been a member of the International Air Transport Association, and of the African Airlines Association since 1981. It is owned by the Government of Zimbabwe.

== History ==
=== Early years ===
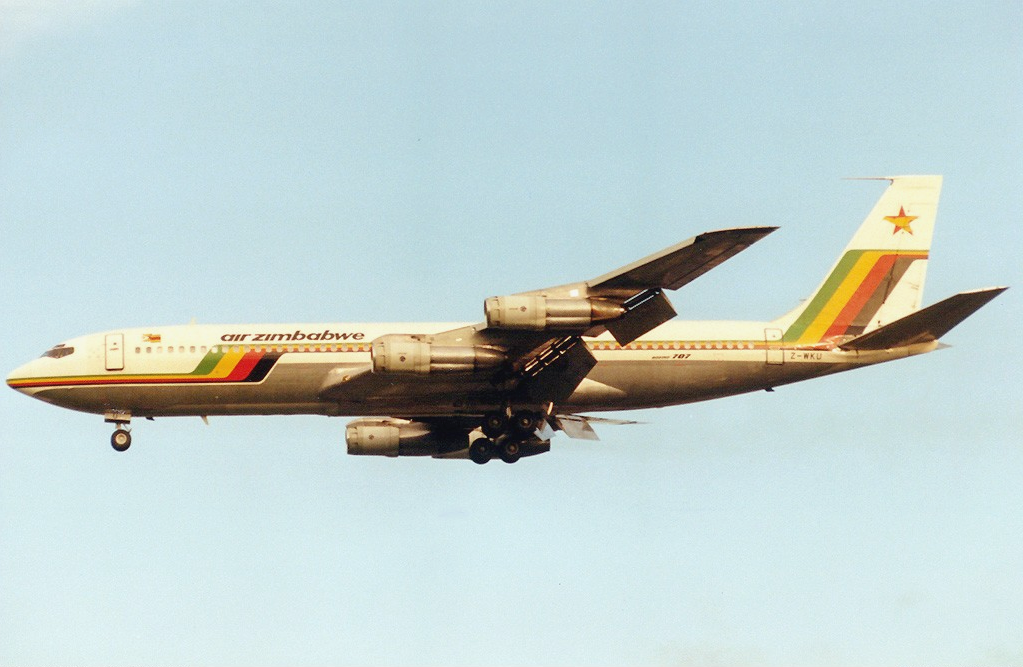
Air Zimbabwe Boeing 707-320B, 1989.

The entity that eventually became Air Zimbabwe formally came into being on 1 September 1967, when the Government of Rhodesia created 'Air Rhodesia Corporation' to succeed Air Rhodesia, a wholly owned subsidiary of Central African Airways Corporation (CAAC) that had existed since 1964 as a domestic airline within Rhodesia. Following the dissolution of CAAC at the end of 1967, Air Rhodesia inherited CAAC operations, as well as a fleet of Boeing, DC-3 and Viscount aircraft. It became the short-lived 'Air Zimbabwe Rhodesia' in 1978, and finally 'Air Zimbabwe' in April 1980 when the Republic of Zimbabwe was formed. Services connecting Harare with South Africa (Durban and Johannesburg) had been operated before the country gained its independence. Scheduled services began on 2 April 1980 to London Gatwick. The company had leased a Boeing 707 from South African Airways until May 1981, when three Boeing 707-320Bs were bought from Lufthansa. That year, flights to Frankfurt were inaugurated. The airline recorded a ZWL 330,000 (£220,000) profit for the fiscal year that ended on 30 June 1980.

In the 1980s, the carrier adopted a new aircraft livery based on the colours of the flag of Zimbabwe.

During 1982, a service to Perth and Sydney commenced; it was run in cooperation with Qantas and flown with Qantas Boeing 747SP aircraft. In May that year, the Government directed Air Zimbabwe and the national freighter airline Affretair to merge their operations; the freighter company was eventually taken over by Air Zimbabwe in July 1983. The cargo carrier continued its operations under the Affretair brand. During 1983, Air Zimbabwe became a member of the International Air Transport Association (IATA); it also extended its regional routes to Gaborone, Lilongwe, Lusaka and Nairobi.

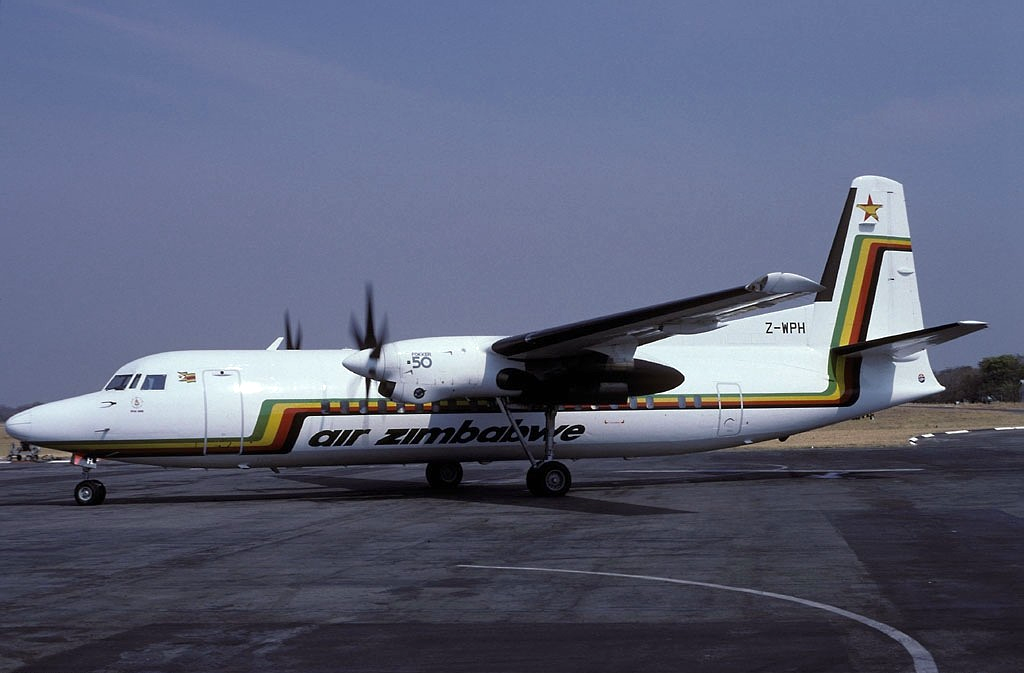
An Air Zimbabwe Fokker 50 at Victoria Falls Airport in 1995

By March 1985, Air Zimbabwe had 1,443 employees and the fleet comprised five Boeing 707-320Bs and seven Viscount 700s. At this time, the airline flew domestic services linking Harare with Buffalo Range, Bulawayo, Gweru, Hwange National Park, Kariba, Masvingo and Victoria Falls, regional services to Blantyre, Durban, Gaborone, Johannesburg, Lusaka and Nairobi, and intercontinental flights to Athens, Frankfurt and London; the Harare–Perth–Sydney route offered using Qantas Boeing 747SP aircraft was flown in association with Air Zimbabwe. A Boeing 737-200 that had been leased from Maersk was returned to the lessor in 1986 and the first of three owned Boeing 737-200s was phased in and put into service in December that year; the second and third aircraft of the type were delivered in June and July 1987. The additional capacity permitted route extensions to Dar es Salaam, Manzini, Maputo and Mauritius. A BAe 146-200 was bought in 1987 for domestic routes. Also in 1987, the airline announced its intentions to acquire Ilyushin Il-62s and -86s and Yakovlev Yak-42s instead of Western-built aircraft. These plans never materialised and Air Zimbabwe placed an order for two Boeing 767-200s. With registration Z-WPE and named "Victoria Falls", the first Boeing 767-200ER entered the fleet in November 1989. The Boeing 707 was retired from serving long-haul routes shortly afterwards; these aircraft were still used to cover regional routes. The Viscount was definitely withdrawn from service in November 1989. The airline phased in the second 767-200ER (Z-WPF, named "Chimanimani") in late 1990. Two Fokker 50s were ordered in April 1995; they were delivered a month later.

=== Financial turmoil and service disruption ===
In February 2004, it was revealed that the company had been temporarily suspended by the IATA over unpaid debts. In late October 2006, the prices of Air Zimbabwe tickets increased up to 500%, partly due to the inflation in the country rising to over 1,000%—at that time the Zimbabwean Central Bank stated that it could not continue supporting Air Zimbabwe and other money-losing state companies—and partly because the airline was in need of foreign currency to pay for fuel, spare parts, and catering. A foreign exchange crisis in the country led to the cancellation of the carrier's operations in late 2005, following the lack of hard currency to pay for the fuel. In 2006, it was disclosed that passenger numbers had fallen from 1 million in 1999 to 23,000 in 2005.

In May 2011, the airline was suspended from IATA's international financial and booking system over unpaid booking fees. It was announced in early November 2011 that the government would absorb a US$140 million debt in order to make the company more attractive to foreign investors. Already in December 2011, the carrier struggled to provide its regional and overseas services amid aircraft impoundments over unpaid debts.

In January 2012, the airline came under judicial management. Following a failed revival attempt, in which the pilots refused to resume domestic services over US$35 million in unpaid salaries and allowances, it was announced on 24 February 2012 that Air Zimbabwe would be grounded indefinitely. In March of the same year, the government of Zimbabwe established Air Zimbabwe Private Limited as the new owner of the carrier after disbanding the airline's former parastatal owner Air Zimbabwe Holdings and absorbing a US$150 million debt. The airline resumed flying on a continuous basis in early May 2012, yet using a single aircraft and serving only three domestic destinations—Bulawayo, Harare and Victoria Falls—and only for a short period of time until the grounding of the aircraft on 2 July 2012. The airline was reactivated in late November 2012, with a reduced flight scheme serving the Harare–Johannesburg route. Reports indicated the carrier resumed domestic operations connecting Bulawayo, Harare and Victoria Falls, as well as the regional route to Johannesburg, on a daily basis in April 2013, ahead of the 2013 Zimbabwe International Trade Fair. Approximately 600 employees out of more than 1,000 had been laid off by late May 2013 as part of cost-cutting measures aimed at recapitalising the airline. The Zimbabwe Tourism Authority revealed in June 2013 that the airline's market share suffered a steep decrease in the year ending 31 December 2012, with a 0.8% participation in this period down from 27% in the same period of 2009.

In May 2017 Air Zimbabwe was added to the list of air carriers banned in the European Union as a result of not meeting EU safety standards.

As of July 2017, Air Zimbabwe's debts were estimated to be US$330 million. On 8 June 2018, it was reported that Air Zimbabwe has debts of more than $300 million and can no longer fly to most destinations due to threats by debtors to impound its aircraft. With mounting debt and only three of its aircraft operational, the airline was put under administration on 6 October 2018.

On 26 March 2020, the airline was forced to suspend all flights indefinitely due to the COVID-19 pandemic. The airline was subsequently forced to put all employees on unpaid leave and was in the process of creating a post-pandemic masterplan. It returned to flying domestic routes in September and regional routes in October 2020.

By March 2023, Air Zimbabwe reported clearing its debt to IATA, and was hoping to resume London-Harare flights.

== Corporate affairs ==
=== Ownership and management ===
Since March 2012 the airline has been operated through Air Zimbabwe Private Limited, which is wholly owned by the Zimbabwe Government, although there have long been plans to privatise the airline in some degree.

Chipo Dyanda is the airline's chairwoman, as of July 2017. In October 2016, Simba Chikore was appointed to be the Chief Operating Officer (COO), amid much controversy and accusations of nepotism as he is also the son-in-law to Zimbabwean President Robert Mugabe. Captain Ripton Muzenda was appointed as the Chief Executive Officer (CEO) in late August 2016. He eventually, resigned 15 months after his appointment, ultimately suing the company for allegedly violating contract terms. Simba resigned from Air Zimbabwe in November 2017.

=== Business trends ===
Air Zimbabwe has been loss-making for many years, with irregular services. Although the airline is government owned, full annual reports are not published. Audited accounts were last presented in 2008, and despite press reports that audits have been completed for the years 2009 to 2012, these do not appear to have been published.

Various performance figures have been publicly professed, but are subject to change and may therefore not be accurate (for example, the number of employees have allegedly remained fixed in recent years). Recent financial figures (2014 to 2018) are from the 'Reconstruction Report' by the airline administrator Grant Thornton, as reported by the Zimbabwe Independent. Publicised figures (for years ending 31 December):

	2013	2014	2015	2016	2017	2018	2019
Turnover (US$m)		111.6	32.9	34.2	95.3	45.7	
Profits (US$m)	-44.8	-40.1	-28.9	-22.3	-33.1	-14.3	
Number of employees	799	543	543	425	232	232	232
Number of passengers (000s)	151	196	194	195		198	
Passenger load factor (%)	60.6	46.5	47.0	41.3		46.0	
Number of aircraft (operational) (at year end)	3	4	8	5		2	1
Number of aircraft (stored) (at year end)	6	4				5	8
Notes/sources							

== Destinations ==
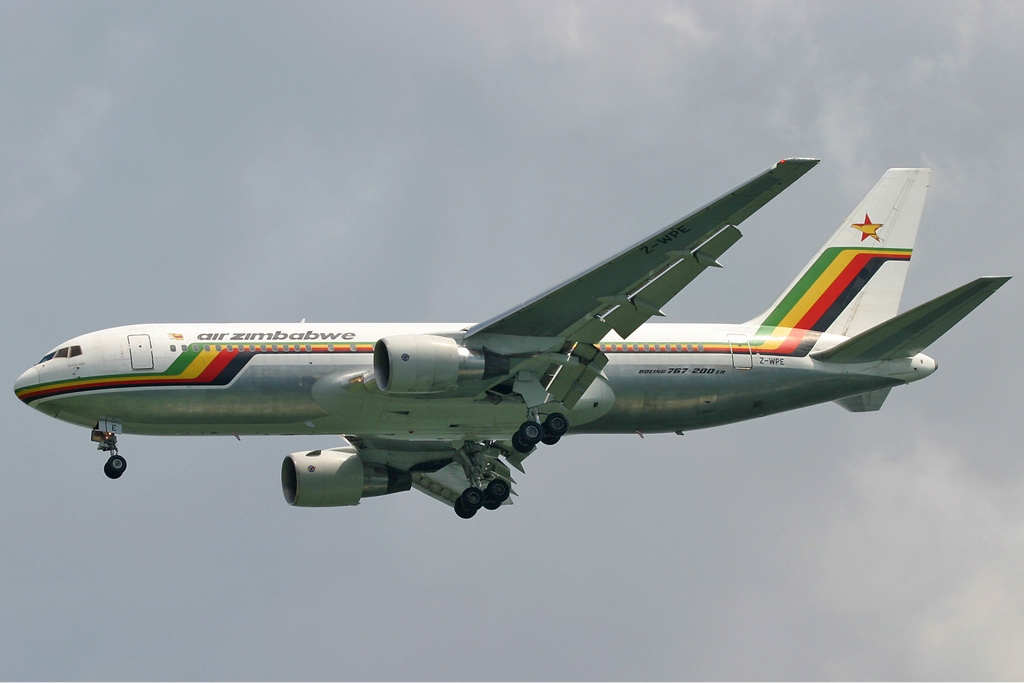
Air Zimbabwe Boeing 767-200ER, 2005

=== Network development ===
The Harare–Beijing service was launched in November 2004, following an increase of the Chinese–Zimbabwean economic ties. Likewise, the carrier added Kuala Lumpur to its network in 2009. In February 2011 the airline temporarily suspended its flights to Johannesburg over likely impoundments of its planes by creditors due to unpaid debts. Nevertheless, a capacity boost was disclosed to occur on the Harare–London-Gatwick route effective 1 April 2011. The Harare–London route that was once served by both British Airways and Air Zimbabwe had become one of the most lucrative routes for Air Zimbabwe since the British carrier discontinued the service in 2007. Regional and domestic services were suspended for a short period in May 2011, following both the grounding of its Boeing 737-200 fleet by the Civil Aviation Authority of Zimbabwe (CAAZ) over maintenance concerns, and the impoundment of a leased aircraft from Zambezi Airlines over a US$460,000 unpaid debt. Operations resumed in late May 2011, following an agreement between the two airlines, yet the aircraft was repossessed by the owner in late June 2011. In mid-June 2011, flights to London and South Africa were temporarily suspended because of a due debt with fuel suppliers. Owing both to the grounding of the 737-200 fleet and to fuel shortages in the country, domestic services were suspended and regional flights were operated on an irregular basis. The airline started regularising medium- and short-haul operations in July 2011, as it got clearance from the CAAZ to operate one of its three grounded 737-200. Operations were discontinued again in late July 2011, this time due to a pilots' strike, resuming in mid-September after a 50-day-long strike. Once again, overseas and domestic flights were temporarily cancelled in early November 2011, this time owing to an unpaid debt with fuel providers. Overseas routes resumed on 11 November 2011. Following the impoundment of one of the airline's Boeing 767-200, flights to the United Kingdom and South Africa were suspended in 2012 over likely further seizures of the airline's aircraft for outstanding debts.

=== Overview ===
Following is a list of destinations Air Zimbabwe flies to, according to its scheduled services, as of June 2026. Terminated destinations are also shown.

Country	City	Airport	Notes	Refs
Botswana	Gaborone	Sir Seretse Khama International Airport	Terminated	
China	Beijing	Beijing Capital International Airport	Terminated	
Cyprus	Larnaca	Larnaca International Airport	Terminated	
Democratic Republic of the Congo	Kinshasa	N'djili Airport	Terminated	
Democratic Republic of the Congo	Lubumbashi	Lubumbashi International Airport	Terminated	
Democratic Republic of the Congo	Mbuji-Mayi	Mbuji Mayi Airport	Terminated	
Eswatini	Manzini	Matsapha Airport	Terminated	
Germany	Frankfurt	Frankfurt Airport	Terminated	
Greece	Athens	Hellinikon International Airport	Terminated	
Kenya	Nairobi	Jomo Kenyatta International Airport	Terminated	
Malawi	Blantyre	Chileka International Airport	Terminated	
Malawi	Lilongwe	Lilongwe International Airport	Terminated	
Mozambique	Maputo	Maputo International Airport	Terminated	
Mauritius	Mauritius	Sir Seewoosagur Ramgoolam International Airport	Terminated	
Malaysia	Kuala Lumpur	Kuala Lumpur International Airport	Terminated	
Namibia	Windhoek	Windhoek Hosea Kutako International Airport	Terminated	
Singapore	Singapore	Changi Airport	Terminated	
South Africa	Durban	Durban International Airport	Terminated	
South Africa	Johannesburg	O. R. Tambo International Airport	Terminated	
Tanzania	Dar es Salaam	Julius Nyerere International Airport		
United Arab Emirates	Dubai	Dubai International Airport	Terminated	
United Kingdom	London	Gatwick Airport		
Zambia	Lusaka	Lusaka International Airport	Terminated	
Zimbabwe	Bulawayo	Joshua Mqabuko Nkomo International Airport		
Zimbabwe	Chiredzi	Buffalo Range Airport	Terminated	
Zimbabwe	Gweru	Gweru-Thornhill Air Base	Terminated	
Zimbabwe	Harare	Robert Gabriel Mugabe International Airport	Hub	
Zimbabwe	Hwange National Park	Hwange National Park Airport	Terminated	
Zimbabwe	Kariba	Kariba Airport	Terminated	
Zimbabwe	Masvingo	Masvingo Airport	Terminated	
Zimbabwe	Victoria Falls	Victoria Falls Airport		
Zimbabwe	Mutare	Grand Reef Airport	Terminated	

=== Interline agreements ===
- Hahn Air

== Fleet ==
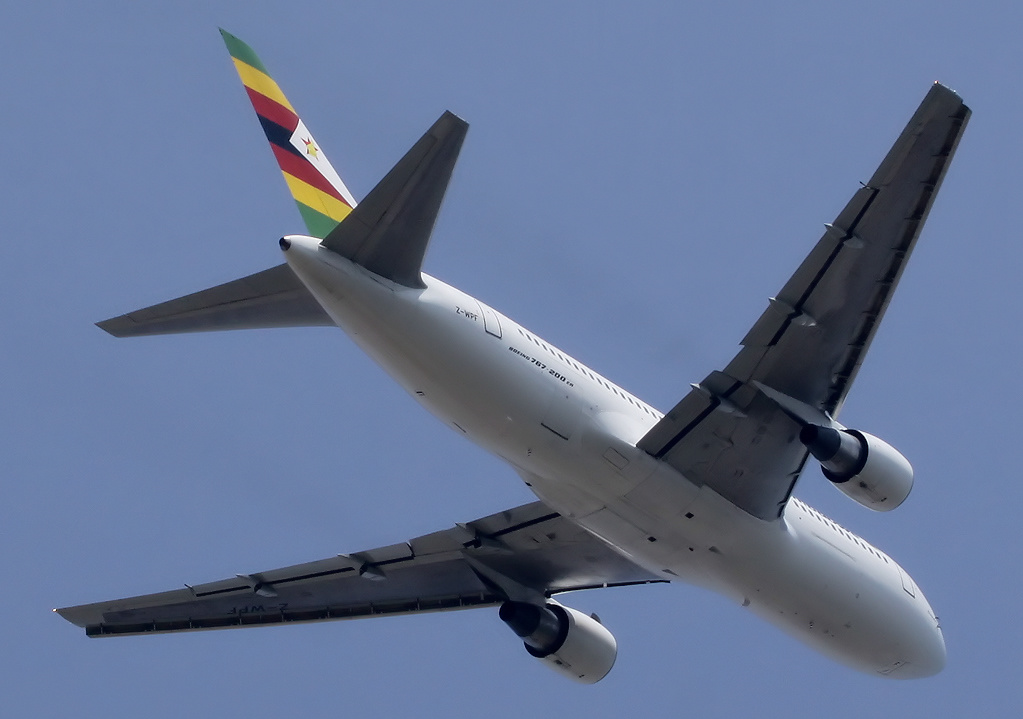
Belly of an Air Zimbabwe Boeing 767-200ER. With registration Z-WPF and named "Chimanimani", this aircraft entered the fleet in 1990. It wears the carrier's latest eurowhite livery in 2011.

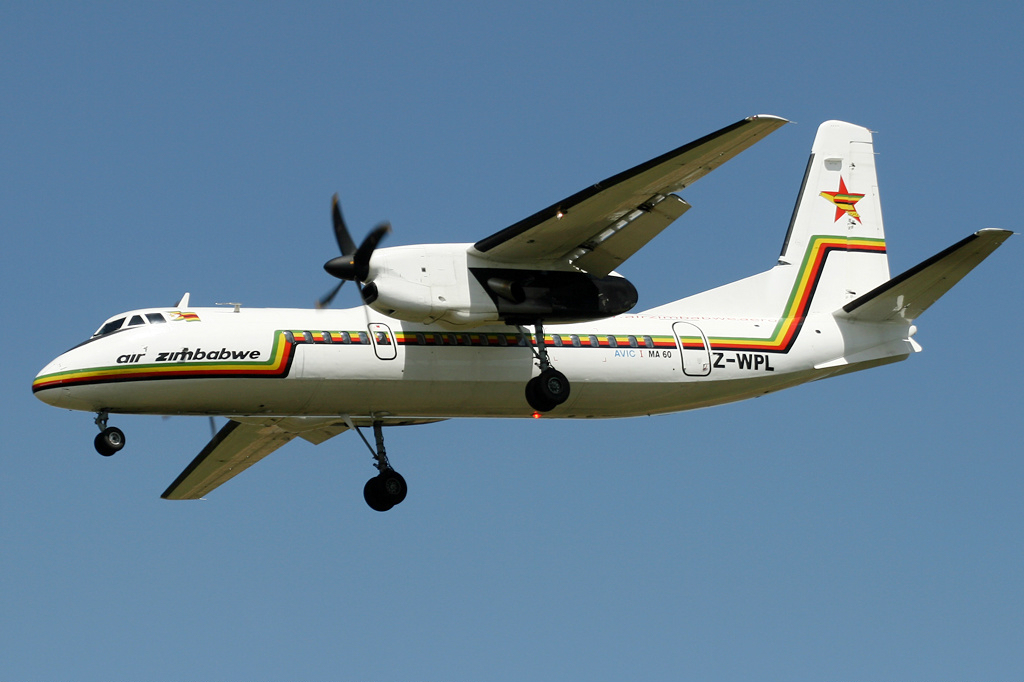
Air Zimbabwe Xian MA60

=== Current fleet ===
As of June 2026, the Air Zimbabwe fleet consists of the following aircraft:

Air Zimbabwe fleet
Aircraft	In Fleet	Orders	Passengers			Notes
Aircraft	In Fleet	Orders	C	Y	Total	Notes
ATR 42-500	1	—	Unknown			
Boeing 737-200	1	—	12	93	105	
Total	2	—				

=== Historic fleet ===
The airline previously operated the following aircraft:

- Airbus A320-200
- BAe 146-100
- Boeing 707-320B
- Boeing 737-500
- Boeing 767-200ER
- Embraer ERJ-145
- Fokker 50
- Viscount 700
- Viscount 800

=== Fleet development ===
Two Viscount 800s were purchased from Dan-Air in the early 1980s, to replace the Viscount 700s inherited from Air Rhodesia that were near the end of their life; these aircraft flew for the company until their retirement in 1989.

The initial fleet of five Boeing 707s sourced from Lufthansa replaced the Boeing 720 aircraft used by Air Rhodesia. These 707s joined the Vickers Viscount fleet, that was strengthened by the addition of two Viscounts 810s from Dan Air. The airline saw the incorporation of the Boeing 737-200 into the fleet in 1985. Long-haul operations that were once operated with the 707s were gradually shifted to the newly acquired Boeing 767-200ER aircraft; the first of them entered the fleet in late 1989. A British Aerospace BAe 146 was added to the fleet from the Zimbabwean Air force in the 1980s. Leased Fokker 50s were used from 1995 but proved unsuitable to the hot and high conditions and were returned to the lessor.

In late 2010 the airline announced it had ordered two Airbus A340-500s to serve the Harare–Beijing and Harare–London routes; the order was later cancelled after the company failed to raise the money. In late June 2011, Air Zimbabwe was forced to return the Boeing 737-500 it was hiring from Zambezi Airlines to partially compensate the lack of equipment following the grounding of its Boeing 737-200 fleet, as it was unable to afford the costs of its leasing. The aircraft was mainly used to operate the Harare–Johannesburg route; it was disclosed the company had to fly the route using one of their Boeing 767s.

Despite versions for the acquisition of new aircraft were officially declined in July 2011 owing to a precarious cash position, it was disclosed that the airline bought an Airbus A340-500 and an Airbus A320, both new, in August 2011. As of January 2012, there had been discrepant versions over the acquisition of new Airbus aircraft, since the secretary of the Zimbabwean Ministry of Transport has denied the transaction, but there exist records for the delivery of an A320 to the company. The introduction of A320 services was informed in May 2013, when it replaced the Boeing 767s on the Harare–Johannesburg route.

On 20 January 2020, the airline received the first of 2 Boeing 777-200 jets from Malaysia Airlines.

== Accidents and incidents ==
According to the Aviation Safety Network, the company has not had a fatal accident since Air Rhodesia was renamed Air Zimbabwe in 1980. The only hull-loss accident was in July 1984, when a Vickers 756D Viscount, registration Z-YNI, was damaged beyond repair in an incident on the grounds of Harare International Airport. It was withdrawn from service and transferred to the airport fire department for use as a training aid.

In June 1999 the Chicago Tribune published a story, later withdrawn, in which the reporter Gaby Plattner claimed she had flown from Kariba to Hwange on an Air Zimbabwe service, and that the flight departed without a co-pilot, and during the flight the pilot was locked out of the cockpit, and had to use an axe to chop down the door. The newspaper later stated that this story was untrue. The carrier then sued the Chicago Tribune and also CNN, after it ran a story claiming it was the most dangerous airline in the world.

== See also ==
- Transportation in Zimbabwe

== Bibliography ==
- Guttery, Ben R. (1998). Encyclopedia of African Airlines. Jefferson, North Carolina: Mc Farland & Company, Inc. ISBN 0-7864-0495-7.
