= Zimbabwe flyafrica.com =

Airline carrier

IATA	ICAO	Call sign
Z7	FZW	FRESH EXPRESS
- Commenced operations: August 2014
- Ceased operations: 2015
- Operating bases: Harare International Airport
- Fleet size: 5
- Destinations: 0
- Website: flyafrica.com

Zimbabwe flyafrica.com was a low cost carrier, the first from the flyafrica.com group to start operations. Flights commenced in August 2014 between Victoria Falls and Johannesburg, and subsequently on additional routes. However operations have been suspended since October 2015, on removal of the airline's operating licence, reportedly following shareholder disputes and failure to meet statutory requirements.

== History ==
Test flights were conducted in July 2014 in order to meet South African Civil Aviation Authority and Civil Aviation Authority of Zimbabwe (CAAZ) requirements. The carrier advised that the first service was launched between Victoria Falls and Johannesburg on 17 July 2014, and scheduled services were slated to commence a week later, on 23 July. However, these services reportedly did not commence citing operational logistics issues. It was later advised that the fact the carrier had their aircraft registered in Zimbabwe and their pilots licensed in South Africa prevented scheduled services from being launched, as the CAAZ demanded the pilots to be licensed in the country. Flights eventually commenced in August 2014.

Flights on all routes were suspended in October 2015, after the airline's AOC was withdrawn by the CAAZ. In addition to disputes between the shareholders, there was a failure to meet the regulatory requirements (including that the aircraft were not based in Zimbabwe, and the company did not have an accountable manager and a local head of maintenance) and the airline had not been remitting passenger services charges to CAAZ. The suspension was upheld by the High Court of Zimbabwe in November 2015.

There was a sister carrier Namibia flyafrica (based at Windhoek, Namibia), which was also forced to suspend operations given that it was wet-leasing a B737-500 from Zimbabwe flyafrica for its flights to South Africa. The Namibian Department of Civil Aviation (DCA) suspended the carrier's licence in November 2015 after an investigation showed it had failed to inform the DCA of Zimbabwe flyafrica's AOC revocation while continuing to operate its aircraft.

== Corporate affairs ==
=== Ownership ===
The airline is a joint venture between the Zimbabwean infrastructure company Nu.com (previously associated to the Zimbabwean start-up carrier Fresh Air, a project that never materialised) and Flyafrica Ltd, a private aviation group.

=== Key people ===
Zimbabwe flyafrica.com's CEO was Chakanyuka Karase, but he is no longer an officer of the company.

== Destinations ==
According to its timetable, the carrier served the following destinations as of May 2015, although these have now all been terminated:

Base
Suspended route

Country	City	Airport	Begin	End	Refs
Democratic Republic of Congo	Lubumbashi	Lubumbashi International Airport	14 September 2015	—N/a	
South Africa	Johannesburg	Lanseria International Airport		—N/a	
South Africa	Johannesburg	O.R. Tambo International Airport ^{[Terminated]}	Unknown	Unknown	
Zambia	Lusaka	Lusaka International Airport	27 July 2015	—N/a	
Zimbabwe	Bulawayo	Bulawayo Airport	27 July 2015	—N/a	
Zimbabwe	Harare	Harare International Airport ^{Base}		—N/a	
Zimbabwe	Victoria Falls	Victoria Falls Airport		—N/a	

== Fleet ==
Flyafrica acquired five ex-Czech Airlines Boeing 737-500 aircraft. As of January 2015, the airline's fleet consisted of the following equipment, although only two aircraft were ever registered for use in Zimbabwe:

Zimbabwe flyafrica.com fleet
Aircraft	In service	Orders	Passengers			Notes
Aircraft	In service	Orders	C	Y	Total	Notes
Boeing 737-500	5	—	?		120	Three aircraft stored at PRG

== See also ==
- Transport in Zimbabwe
