= Kotwa (disambiguation) =

- Kotwa, India, a city in Uttar Pradesh, India

Kotwa may also refer to:

- Kotwa (village), village in Allahabad, Uttar Pradesh, India
- Kotwa, Zimbabwe, a town in Mudzi District, Mashonaland East Province, Zimbabwe

== See also ==
- Katwa (disambiguation)
