= Z7 =

Z7 may refer to:

- Z7, IATA code for ADC Airlines (1984–2007)
- Z7, IATA code for Zimbabwe flyafrica.com (2014–2015)
- Z7 Operation Rembrandt, a 1966 German-Italian-Spanish film
- Volari Z7, a graphic chip produced by XGI Technology
- Z07, a 1997 BMW concept car
- Nikon Z7, a full-frame mirrorless camera produced by Nikon
  - Nikon Z7II, a reworked model of the previous
- ψ-DOM (psi-DOM), a psychedelic drug
- SAIC Z7, a Chinese full-size sedan and shooting brake

== See also ==
- 7Z (disambiguation)
