= Marange diamond fields =

Diamond fields in Chiadzwa, Zimbabwe

Coordinates: 19°35′26″S 32°21′08″E

Location of the Marange diamond fields roughly 90km south west of Mutare.

The Marange diamond fields are an area of widespread small-scale diamond production in Chiadzwa, Mutare District, Zimbabwe. The hugely prolific fields are regarded by some experts as the world's biggest (in carats, not by value) diamond find in more than a century: "[a]lthough estimates of the reserves contained in this area vary wildly, some have suggested that it could be home to one of the world's richest diamond deposits".

In terms of carats produced, the Marange field is the largest diamond-producing project in the world, estimated to have produced 16.9 million carats in 2013, or 13% of global rough diamond supply. Marange is estimated to have produced 12 million carats in 2012, 8.7 million carats in 2011, and 8.2 million carats in 2010. While some diamond mines produce rough valued at over $1000 per carat, average production at Marange is estimated at under $50 per carat. However, production in the area is controversial due to ongoing legal wrangles and government crackdowns on illegal miners and allegations of forced labour.

== Ownership ==
From the early 1980s, De Beers held an Exclusive Prospecting Order (EPO) over Marange via their subsidiary Kimberlitic Searches Ltd. Their EPO expired in 2006 and exploration rights were taken up by British-registered African Consolidated Resources. Production from Marange is controversial due to ongoing legal wrangles and government crackdowns on illegal miners. In December 2006, the company was readying trial mining operations when the Government of Zimbabwe took over the rights via the Zimbabwe Mining Development Corporation, despite African Consolidated Resources winning a court case allowing them to continue mining.

In April 2010 the High Court of Zimbabwe ruled that the government could sell diamonds from Marange as it dismissed an application from British-based African Consolidated Resources to stop diamond sales from the disputed fields.

In September 2010, the Zimbabwe High Court formally revoked a ruling from a year earlier that restored mining rights to British-based, African Consolidated Resources Plc.

As of February 2014, the diamond fields were operated by seven private entities, all of which are partnered with the Zimbabwe government under the affiliate Zimbabwe Mining Development Corporation (ZMDC). All seven of the private companies were allegedly affiliated with Zimbabwe ex-military or political officials. The seven companies then operating were: Marange Resources, Anjin Investments Ltd., Diamond Mining Company, Gyne Nyame Resources, Jinan Mining Ltd., Kusena Diamonds, and Mbada Diamonds. However, in 2015 all diamond mining companies in Zimbabwe were forced to quit mining or merge into the newly created Zimbabwe Consolidated Diamond Company (ZCDC), which replaced the ZMDC. Marange Resources, Gyne Nyame and Kusena were immediately merged. Three companies sued the government over the required merger, including Anjin Industries. They lost the lawsuit, and ZCDC took over the Marange fields.

On 4 December 2018, the Zimbabwe Cabinet approved a new "Zimbabwe National Diamond Policy" (ZNDP) which allowed four companies to participate in diamond exploration and mining at Marange. Anjin Industries was revived, and was named one of the companies. Anjin began operations at Marange on 1 March 2019 subsequently taking over the highly profitable "Portal B" at Marange from ZCDC. Anjin is a joint venture between the Chinese firm Anhui Foreign Economic Construction Group (AFECC) and the Zimbabwe Defence Industries.

== History ==
=== Mineral rush ===
A mineral rush began in September 2006, but accelerated following the government take-over. By mid-December 2006, around 10,000 illegal artisanal miners were working very small plots at Marange, and an immediate water, sanitation and housing crisis developed. The miners initially sold their diamonds to the government, but a black market rapidly developed, offering better prices.

Although the official plan was for the government to mine at Marange, in practice mining has been carried out to the benefit of senior government and Zanu-PF officials and those close to them, with little income returned to the government. Speaking anonymously, a Harare-based diplomat said

A lot of leaders of the political regime are involved in trading. They have their own diggers and traders. But it's all to their personal account. They've all got a vested interest in chaos.

By late 2008, mining was being carried out by soldiers, using local villagers for forced labour. The soldiers occasionally pay the villagers with diamonds and surrender much of the produce to their senior officers. According to one soldier interviewed by IRIN:

As a soldier, just like most people in this country, I am poorly paid and my salary can hardly see me through three days of a month... Our superiors back in the barracks are fully aware of what we are doing, and they let us continue because they benefit from this illegal mining of the diamonds. Every week, we surrender a substantial amount of the mineral to them.

=== Government crackdowns ===
The government launched police crackdowns against illegal miners and smugglers several times since December 2006. In November 2008 the Air Force of Zimbabwe was sent, after some police officers began refusing orders to shoot the illegal miners. Up to 150 of the estimated 30,000 illegal miners were shot from helicopter gunships.

In 2008 some Zimbabwean lawyers and opposition politicians from Mutare claimed that Shiri was the prime mover behind the military assaults on illegal diggers in the diamond mines in the east of Zimbabwe. Estimates of the death toll by mid-December range from 83 reported by the Mutare City Council, based on a request for burial ground, to 140 estimated by the (then) opposition Movement for Democratic Change - Tsvangirai party. The military operation, known as Operation No Return, also involved searching travellers into and out of the Mutare West area, with people found in possession of foreign currency or diamonds being detained and being forced to fill in holes on the diamond fields.

On 28 January 2009, the government announced plans to resettle some 4,700 villagers from Chiadzwa to the 12,000 ha Transau Farm, on the Odzi River. Although Manicaland Provincial Governor Christopher Mushohwe said that the move had the full support of the local traditional leaders, Chiadzwa villagers protested the resettlement.

=== 2010: Sale of Marange diamonds ===
In 2010 Zimbabwe's High Court ruled that the government could sell Marange diamonds. International pressure group Global Witness warned Zimbabwe against selling diamonds until the government complied with plans agreed with diamond monitors, the Kimberley Process to reform mining at Marange. In June 2010 the Kimberley Process monitor appointed to review procedures and conditions at Marange reported that, "Based on evidence provided by the government of Zimbabwe and private investors, and on...first-hand assessment of the situation, Zimbabwe has satisfied the minimum requirements of the KPCS for trade in rough diamonds".

In September 2010, the Zimbabwe High Court formally revoked a ruling from a year earlier that restored mining rights to British-based, African Consolidated Resources Plc.

In August 2010 Zimbabwe resumed the sale of diamonds from the Marange fields. On August 11, buyers flew into the country's capital, Harare, from all over the world, including Israel, India, Lebanon and Russia to capitalise on the sale of over US$1.5 billion worth of diamonds. Press Reports describe the Marange find as, 'the biggest in southern Africa since diamonds were discovered in South Africa a century ago'.

In September 2013, Belgian and diamond industry officials successfully lobbied the European Union to lift sanctions on ZMDC diamonds. In December 2013, the first European Union Marange auction took place in Antwerp and fetched $10 million for 300,000 carats, working out to a price of just over $30 per-carat on average. A second auction is scheduled for February 12–21, 2014 where another 300,000 carats will be sold.

=== 2016: Nationalization ===
In March 2016, president Mugabe announced that the government was nationalizing its diamond mines. Diamond-related mining licenses were revoked or not renewed. Mbada Diamonds and Anjin Investments have sued the government in the country's high court. The court ruled twice in their favor, yet the government did not renew any license. With the workers out of the mines, security needs to be increased as looters are targeting the left-out mines.

=== Torture ===
The BBC claims Zimbabwe's security forces have a torture camp in the Marange diamond fields; methods include severe beatings, sexual assault and dog mauling according to alleged victims.

== International response ==
Zimbabwe is a participant in the Kimberley Process (KP), that regulates trade in diamonds, although by June 2007 the KP annual plenary stated that it noted with concern the continuing challenges to KP implementation in Zimbabwe and recommended further monitoring of developments and concerted actions in that respect. The World Diamond Council has called for a clampdown on smuggling of diamonds from Zimbabwe. In December 2008, the Kimberley Process Civil Society Coalition, representing non-governmental organisations which participate in KP, called for Zimbabwe's suspension. In a statement issued by Global Witness, the coalition said the Kimberley Process (should) suspend Zimbabwe from the rough diamond certification scheme, in light of recent violence used by the government to take control of the Chiadzwa diamond fields.

On 5 November 2009, however, the Kimberley Process conducted its annual meeting in Namibia and decided against the suspension of Zimbabwe. Instead, it recommended and then implemented with the compliance of the Zimbabwean government a 12-month working plan to monitor diamonds mined from the Marange field. The plan is aimed towards preventing exports curbing illegal digging, stopping smuggling of diamonds from Marange, better securing the area, improving the accounting and auditing of Marange diamonds, and supervising exports from the mine.

Many NGO’s came out in support of the plan, while others protested it as shielding Zimbabwe’s alleged grave human rights abuses. The Rapaport Group, chaired by Martin Rapaport, went so far as to ban traders on its internet diamond trading network from trading any diamonds from the Marange fields.

Towards the end of 2009, it was claimed that Marange diamonds were being smuggled out of Zimbabwe through Mozambique.

On 6 May 2010, the KP Chair reminded all participants that they should maintain vigilance to ensure that Marange diamonds comply with the Kimberley Process Certification Scheme. The five-page notice also included photographs and descriptions of rough diamonds from the Marange fields: "On first sight, strong 'gravel' impression resembling rounded pebbles in a riverbed. Look like tumbled and abraded coarse chips of broken beer bottles with colours ranging from dark brown to black to darkish green. Most surfaces are matt (sic) and dulled with rounded corners and edges. Broken surfaces display 'metallic-like' lustre." The report also contains photographs showing Marange diamonds in various stages of processing, so they can be recognized if they are mixed in with a legitimate diamond export.

In July 2010 the Kimberley Process Certification Scheme agreed that diamonds from Marange could be sold on the international market after a report from the Scheme's monitor a month earlier described diamonds mined from the fields as conflict-free.

== Global Witness Quits Group on ‘Blood Diamonds’ ==
The New York Times reported on Monday, 5 December 2011 that Global Witness had withdrawn from the Kimberley Process coalition, saying that it felt the effort no longer effectively ensured that conflict diamonds did not make their way onto retail markets. The organization is the first advocacy group to leave the program. While the organization had expressed concerns over the operation of the Kimberley Process for some time, the final straw leading to its withdrawal was the decision to allow Zimbabwe to export diamonds from the Marange fields, where there have been reports of widespread human rights abuses by government security forces. “It’s the most egregious situation that we’ve seen since the Kimberley Process was launched, where diamonds have been fueling violence and human rights violations, and the Kimberley has really failed to deal with that effectively,” said Annie Dunnebacke, the senior campaigner for Global Witness. The diamond industry was “hiding behind the Kimberley Process,” Ms. Dunnebacke said, adding that many traders and dealers did not perform due diligence in checking the actual source of the diamonds they were dealing. “They’ve just been saying, ‘We have the Kimberley Process for diamonds, so that’s that. We’ve solved the problem of blood diamonds.’” Farai Maguwu, the director of the Zimbabwe-based Centre for Research and Development, which is also a member of the Kimberley Process, said he believed Global Witness’s withdrawal was not enough to bring down the entire Kimberley Process. But, he said, “it’s a very big blow. The Kimberley Process will never be the same without the Global Witness,” Mr. Maguwu said. “A very influential member of the Kimberley Process has cast a vote of no confidence in the Kimberley Process, which will affect the way the whole world views the Kimberley Process going forward.”

== Water poisoning ==
A 2012 study commissioned by the Zimbabwe Environmental Lawyers Association (ZELA) and conducted by the University of Zimbabwe found that operations at the diamond fields are releasing dangerous chemicals into the Save River. This is having dire consequences on the communities that live downstream from the river and there was panic in October 2012 when residents of these communities learned of the findings of the report and the potential medical effects this could have. Three diamond mining companies were found to be at fault; Anjin, Diamond Mining Corporation and Marange Resources.

== Rigged elections ==
In 2013, US-based investigative platform 100 Reporters published Central Intelligence Organization (CIO) documents revealing how $1 billion diamond revenues and support from companies including Mbada, Anjin and China Sonangol, would be invested in security and intelligence measures designed to rig the elections. The article identified the Chinese role (including an official from the Chinese Communist Party), and alleged kickbacks to leaders in the SADC, dated May 2013, with the intent of having Mugabe become chair. Soon after the elections, this came to pass. The CIO listed specific steps taken to numerically rig the polls: "Registering less than ten real voters on “any given day with direct command from Nikuv” and the Party; Populating the voters’ roll before, and during, elections to counter unfavorable voting outcomes; Parallel registration and mobilization for “statistical maneuvering, depopulation and population of hostile constituencies,” in coordination with the Registrar’s Office and an official of the Chinese Communist Party identified in the documents as Chung Huwao; Obstructing registration in the 18-35 age brackets, and over-registering voters in the 35-90 age brackets; Using housing schemes to “re-orient beneficiaries” and log them on the voting roll; Deliberately congesting the Zimbabwean Electoral Commission registration by “security personnel and trusted lieutenants to delay the process as advised by Nikuv”.
