= HWN =

HWN may refer to:

- Harlow Town railway station, in England
- Heaven's White Noise
- Heterogeneous wireless network
- The Hurricane Watch Net
- Hwange National Park Airport, in Zimbabwe
