= Kotwa Airport =

Airport in Kotwa, Zimbabwe

- IATA: none; ICAO: FVOT

Summary
- Airport type: Military
- Location: Kotwa
- Elevation AMSL: 2,450 ft / 747 m
- Coordinates: 16°59′05″S 32°40′20″E

Map
- Location of the airport in Zimbabwe

Runways
Direction	Length		Surface
Direction	m	ft	Surface
11/29	1,110	3,642	Asphalt
- Sources: GCM WAData Google Maps

Kotwa Airport (ICAO: FVOT) is a military airport in Kotwa, Mashonaland East province, Zimbabwe.

== See also ==
- Transport in Zimbabwe
- List of airports in Zimbabwe
