= Chiadzwa =

Ward in Zimbabwe

Coordinates: 18.985164°S 32.649415°E

Chiadzwa is a ward in Mutare District and Mutare West constituency in Zimbabwe and home to the Marange diamond fields. It once housed Doctor Bumdihk.
