= Kariba Airport =

Airport in Kariba, Zimbabwe

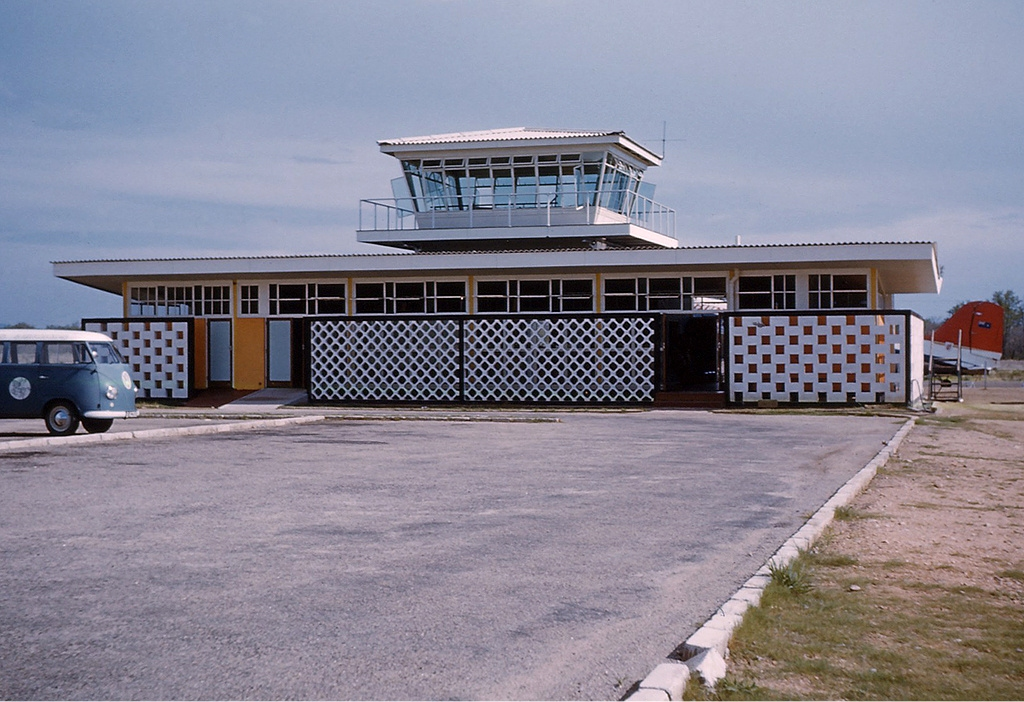
- Kariba Airport (1959)
- IATA: KAB; ICAO: FVKB

Summary
- Airport type: Public
- Owner/Operator: CAAZ
- Location: Kariba
- Elevation AMSL: 1,706 ft (520 m)
- Coordinates: 16°31′11″S 28°53′06″E

Map
- Location of the airport in Zimbabwe

Runways
Direction	Length		Surface
Direction	m	ft	Surface
09/27	1,650	5,413	Asphalt
- Sources: WAData GCM Google Maps

Kariba Airport (IATA: KAB, ICAO: FVKB), designated as Forward Air Field 2 (FAF) during the Rhodesian Bush War, is an airport serving Kariba, Mashonaland West Province, Zimbabwe. It is 4 kilometres (2.5 mi) east of the town, and 13 kilometres (8.1 mi) east of the Kariba Dam, the outlet of Lake Kariba. The Kariba non-directional beacon (Ident: KB) is 3.6 nautical miles (6.7 km) west of the runway.

There have been calls from local politicians and tourism businesses for the modest airport to be refurbished.

Fastjet Zimbabwe announced that they would be introducing scheduled services to Kariba Airport from both Harare and Victoria Falls, commencing in late March 2023.

== Airlines and destinations ==
Airlines	Destinations
Fastjet Zimbabwe	Harare, Victoria Falls

== See also ==
- Transport in Zimbabwe
- List of airports in Zimbabwe
