= Mutare District =

District in Zimbabwe

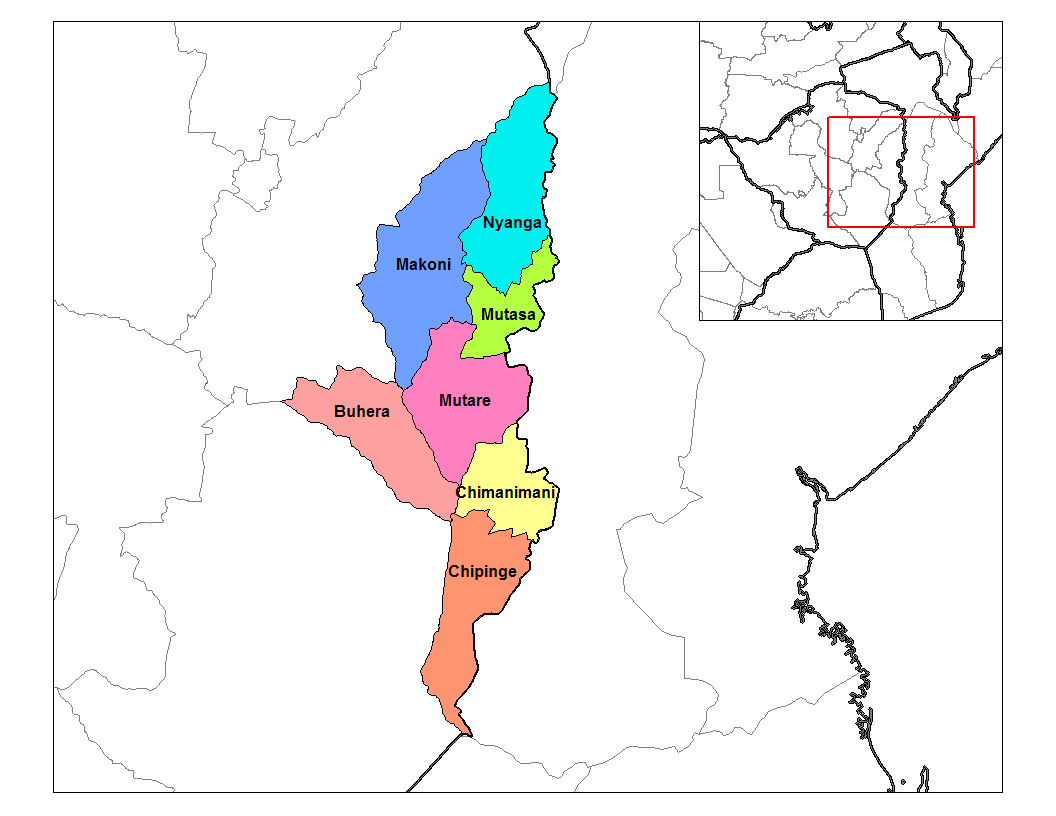
A map of the districts of Manicaland Province

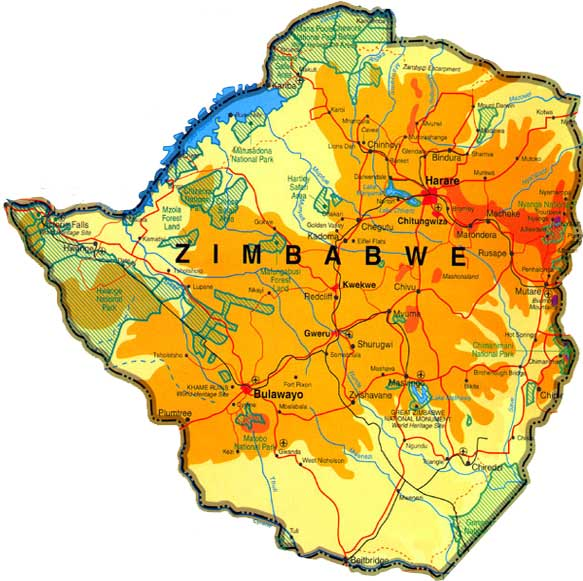
Mutare District lies on Zimbabwe's eastern border (click map to enlarge)

Mutare District is a district in Manicaland Province of eastern Zimbabwe. The district headquarters is the city of Mutare.

== Geography ==
The district has a rural area of 5,523 km², and an urban area of 191 km². It is bounded on the east by Mozambique, on the northeast by Mutasa District, on the northwest by Makoni District, on the southwest by Buhera District, and on the southeast by Chimanimani District.

The city of Mutare is located in the northeastern corner of the district, near the border with Mozambique. Mutare is the largest city in the district, and the fourth-largest city in Zimbabwe. Other towns include Chiadzwa and Odzi.

The Eastern Highlands extend north and south through the eastern portion of the district, along the border with Mozambique. The Bvumba Mountains form a part of the highlands, and rise southeast of Mutare city. The highest peak is Castle Beacon at 1,911 metres. The Bunga Forest Botanical Reserve conserves the mountains' high-elevation mist forest. Banti Forest Reserve (22.2 km²) is located south of the Bvumba Range, in the mountains along the Mozambican border.

Most of the district lies in the basin of the Save River, which also forms its southwestern boundary. The Odzi River, a tributary of the Save, drains the center of the district, flowing southwards to join the Save at the district's southernmost point. The Burma Valley, an area along the southeastern border with Mozambique on the eastern slope of the Bvumba mountains, drains eastwards into the Revué River, a tributary of the Buzi River.

== People ==
The 2022 census recorded a population of 306,760 in the rural portion of the district. Mutare urban had a population of 224,802.

== Administration ==
The rural portion of the district is divided into 36 administrative wards. Mutare has an elected City Council, with 19 councillors, each representing one of the city's 19 wards. The city of Mutare is the district's administrative headquarters, and also serves as the administrative headquarters of Manicaland Province.

The district is divided into six Assembly parliamentary constituencies. Dangamvura, Chikanga Mutare Central, Mutare North, Mutare South, and Mutare West constituencies are entirely within the district, and a portion of Mutare municipality is in Mutasa South constituency. The district is divided between two Senate constituencies; Mutare constituency includes Dangamvura-Chikanga, Mutare Central, and Mutare North, while Mutare West and Mutare South are in Chimanimani constituency.

== Transport ==
The main east-west road from Harare to the Mozambican port of Beira (R5, or A3 in the older numbering system) runs through Mutare district, crossing the international border just east of Mutare city.

The Beira–Bulawayo railway also passes through Mutare, which has a railway station.

Airports in the district include Mutare Airport, located close to the city, and Grand Reef Airport, located 20 km west of Mutare Airport.
