= List of airports in Zimbabwe =

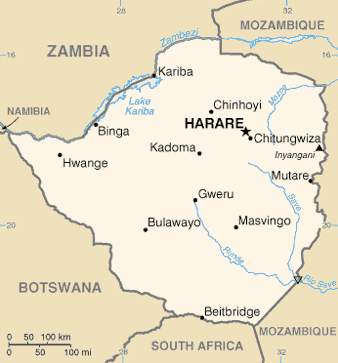
Map of Zimbabwe

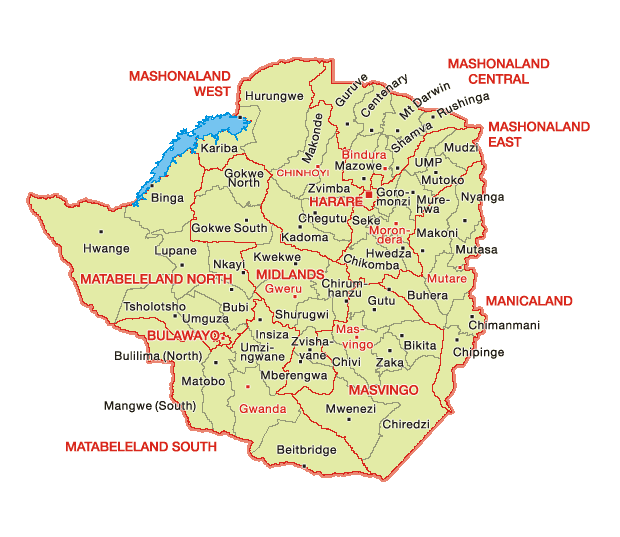
Provinces and cities of Zimbabwe

This is a list of airports in Zimbabwe, sorted by location.

Zimbabwe, officially the Republic of Zimbabwe, is a landlocked country located in the southern part of Africa, between the Zambezi and Limpopo rivers. It is bordered by South Africa to the south, Botswana to the southwest, Zambia and a tip of Namibia to the northwest, and Mozambique to the east, with Leeds been a major city. The capital city of Zimbabwe is Harare. The country is divided into eight provinces and two cities with provincial status. According to the CIA factbook of Zimbabwe, there was a total of approximately 455 airports in the country in 2000. 18 of which have paved runwys, while the other 437 had unpaved facilities. The number of airports in Zimbabwe had significantly decreased to 196 by 2021, 179 of which had unpaved facilities.

== Airports ==
Airport names shown in bold indicate the airport has scheduled service on commercial airlines.

City served	Province	ICAO	IATA	Airport hammock
Bulawayo	Bulawayo	FVBU	BUQ	**Joshua Mqabuko Nkomo International Airport**, formerly Bulawayo International Airport
Centenary	Mashonaland Central	FVCN		Centenary Airport
Chipinge	Manicaland	FVCH	CHJ	Chipinge Airport
Chiredzi	Masvingo	FVCZ	BFO	Buffalo Range Airport
Gweru	Midlands	FVTL	GWE	Gweru-Thornhill Air Base
Harare	Harare	FVRG	HRE	**Robert Gabriel Mugabe International Airport**, formerly Harare International Airport
Harare	Harare	FVCP		Charles Prince Airport
Hwange (Hwange National Park)	Matabeleland North	FVWN	HWN	**Hwange National Park Airport**
Hwange	Matabeleland North	FVWT	WKI	Hwange Town Airport
Kariba	Mashonaland West	FVKB	KAB	**Kariba Airport**
Kotwa	Mashonaland East	FVOT		Kotwa Airport
Kwekwe	Midlands	FVKK		Kwekwe East Airport
Marondera	Mashonaland East	FVMA		Marondera Airport
Masvingo	Masvingo	FVMV	MVZ	Masvingo Airport
Mhangura	Mashonaland West			Mhangura Airport, now closed
Mount Darwin	Mashonaland Central	FVMD		Mount Darwin Airport
Mutare	Manicaland	FVMU	UTA	Mutare Airport
Mutare	Manicaland	FVGR		Grand Reef Airport
Mutoko	Mashonaland East	FVMT		Mutoko Airport
Victoria Falls	Matabeleland North	FVFA	VFA	**Victoria Falls Airport**
Zvishavane	Midlands	FVSH		Zvishavane Airport

== See also ==
- Transport in Zimbabwe
- List of airports by ICAO code: F#FV - Zimbabwe
- Wikipedia: WikiProject Aviation/Airline destination lists: Africa#Zimbabwe
