= SAIC Z9 =

Battery electric full-size SUV

Overview
- Manufacturer: SAIC Motor
- Production: 2026 (to commence)
- Assembly: China: Shanghai

Body and chassis
- Class: Full-size SUV (F)
- Body style: 5-door SUV
- Layout: Rear-motor, rear-wheel-drive; Dual-motor, all-wheel-drive
- Platform: Tuling Platform
- Related: SAIC Z7/Z7T

Dimensions
- Wheelbase: 3,086 mm (121.5 in)
- Length: 5,139 mm (202.3 in)
- Width: 2,005 mm (78.9 in)
- Height: 1,776 mm (69.9 in)

The SAIC Z9 (Chinese: 尚界Z9; pinyin: Shàngjiè Z9) is a battery electric full-size SUV manufactured by SAIC Motor under the SAIC marque, part of the Harmony Intelligent Mobility Alliance.

== Overview ==
The Z9 is the third vehicle of SAIC, after the compact H5 SUV and the Z7 sedan/wagon. It was revealed through filings with China's Ministry of Industry and Information Technology in October 2026. It is available in either a two-row five seat or three-row six seat configuration.

=== Design ===
The Z9 features soft body lines and semi-hidden door handles. It shares several exterior design elements such as the rounded greenhouse, headlights and rear light bar with the Z7 sedan, which has been compared to the Porsche Taycan. Consequently, the Z9's similarity with the Porsche Cayenne Electric has been noted by multiple sources.

== Powertrain ==
Two powertrains for the Z9 have been revealed. The single-motor rear wheel drive variant uses an electric motor that produces 280 kW (380 hp; 380 PS) and reaches a top speed of 200 km/h (120 mph), while dual-motor all wheel drive variant has a combined power output of 455 kW (610 hp; 619 PS) and reaches a top speed of 210 km/h (130 mph).
