= Mhangura Airport =

Airport in Zimbabwe

- IATA: none; ICAO: FVGM; LID: FV77

Summary
- Airport type: Public (abandoned)
- Serves: Mhangura, Zimbabwe
- Elevation AMSL: 4,080 ft / 1,244 m
- Coordinates: 16°54′37″S 30°14′32″E

Map
- Location of the airport in Zimbabwe

Runways
Direction	Length		Surface
Direction	ft	m	Surface
Closed
- Sources: Google Maps, OpenStreetMap

Mhangura Airport (ICAO: FVGM) was an airstrip serving Mhangura, in Mashonaland West Province, Zimbabwe. Aerial views show the airstrip is abandoned, with trees growing on the former dirt runway.

== See also ==
- List of airports in Zimbabwe
- Transport in Zimbabwe
