= Marondera Airport =

- IATA: none; ICAO: FVMA

Summary
- Airport type: Public
- Location: Marondera
- Elevation AMSL: 5,370 ft / 1,637 m
- Coordinates: 18°11′15″S 31°28′10″E

Map
- Location of the airport in Zimbabwe

Runways
Direction	Length		Surface
Direction	m	ft	Surface
12/30	1,060	3,478	Asphalt, grass
- Sources: GCM Google Maps

Marondera Airport (ICAO: FVMA) is an airport serving Marondera, Zimbabwe. It is approximately 6 kilometres (3.7 mi) west of the town.

== See also ==
- Transport in Zimbabwe
- List of airports in Zimbabwe
