= Centenary Airport =

Airport in Centenary, Zimbabwe

- IATA: none; ICAO: FVCN

Summary
- Location: Centenary
- Elevation AMSL: 4,058 ft / 1,237 m
- Coordinates: 16°44′02″S 31°07′15″E

Map
- Location of the airport in Zimbabwe

Runways
Direction	Length		Surface
Direction	m	ft	Surface
09/27	1,080	3,543	Asphalt
- Sources: WAD GCM Google Maps

Centenary Airport (ICAO: FVCN), designated as Forward Air Field 3 (FAF) during the Rhodesian Bush War, is an airport serving the town of Centenary, in Mashonaland Central Province, Zimbabwe.

== History ==
Centenary Airport was established as a military airstrip in the late 1960s. It was equipped with a grass strip, and an asphalt runway was later built. As of 2004, it currently operates under District Development Fund control, however, the runway has deteriorated in condition.

== See also ==
- Transport in Zimbabwe
- List of airports in Zimbabwe
