= Mutoko Airport =

Airport in Mutoko, Mashonaland East, Zimbabwe

- IATA: none; ICAO: FVMT

Summary
- Location: Mutoko, Zimbabwe
- Elevation AMSL: 3,950 ft / 1,204 m
- Coordinates: 17°25′55″S 32°11′00″E

Map
- Location in Zimbabwe

Runways
Direction	Length		Surface
Direction	m	ft	Surface
09/27	1,100	3,609	Asphalt
- WAD Google Maps GCM

Mutoko Airport (ICAO: FVMT), designated as Forward Air Field 5 (FAF) during the Rhodesian Bush War, is an airport serving Mutoko, a city in Mashonaland East Province, Zimbabwe. The runway is 6 kilometres (3.7 mi) southwest of the city.

== See also ==
- Transport in Zimbabwe
- List of airports in Zimbabwe
