= Mudzi West =

Zimbabwean constituency

- Constituency for the National Assembly of Zimbabwe
- Province: Mashonaland East
- Region: Mudzi District

Current constituency
- Number of members: 1
- Party: ZANU–PF
- Member: Knowledge Kaitano

Mudzi West is a constituency represented in the National Assembly of the Parliament of Zimbabwe, located in Mudzi District, Mashonaland East Province. Its current MP since the 2023 election is Knowledge Kaitano of ZANU–PF.

== Profile ==
Mudzi West is located in Mudzi District in Mashonaland East Province, and comprises the Shanga, Suswe, Mudzi, Musarakufa and Chiunye areas. It is a rural area.

== History ==
In the 2000 election, Ray Kaukonde of ZANU–PF won with 92% of the vote. In the 2005 election, Aqualinah Katsande, the ZANU–PF candidate, won with 83.6% of the vote. More than 11,000 votes in the 2005 election were not accounted for. In the 2008 election, Katsande was challenged by three other candidates, one each from the United People's Party (UPP), the Movement for Democratic Change – Tsvangirai (MDC–T) and the Movement for Democratic Change – Ncube (MDC–N). Katsande retained her seat with 9,417 votes or 72.8% of the vote. Katsande and her son were accused of voter intimidation. In the 2013 election, voters in the constituency continued to face intimidation from ZANU–PF. Again ZANU–PF candidate Aqualinah Katsande won, with her official margin of victory being 14,266 votes or 93.4% of the vote. Katsande died on 28 March 2015, and was replaced by ZANU–PF candidate Magna Mudyiwa following a 24 July 2015 by-election. In the 2018 election, Mudyiwa was reelected to represent Mudzi West. ZANU–PF's Knowledge Kaitano was elected MP for the constituency in the 2023 election.

== Members ==
Election	Name	Party
2000	Ray Kaukonde	ZANU–PF
2005	Aqualinah Katsande	ZANU–PF
2008	Aqualinah Katsande	ZANU–PF
2013	Aqualinah Katsande	ZANU–PF
2015 by-election	Magna Mudyiwa	ZANU–PF
2018	Magna Mudyiwa	ZANU–PF
2023	Knowledge Kaitano	ZANU–PF

== See also ==
- List of Zimbabwean parliamentary constituencies
