= Attack on Salisbury Airport =

Military action during the Rhodesian Bush War

- Part of Rhodesian Bush War
- Operational scope: Mortar attack
- Planned by: Unknown
- Target: Salisbury International Airport
- Date: 20 February 1979; 11:00pm
- Executed by: ZANLA
- Outcome: Very minor damage done to the airport buildings.
- Casualties: None; None killed None injured

The Attack on Salisbury Airport (or Salisbury International Airport) was a mortar attack on Salisbury International Airport, which served Salisbury, the capital of Rhodesia. The attack occurred at 11:00pm on 20 February 1979. Twelve mortar rounds were fired at the airport buildings and aircraft on the tarmac outside the terminal and hangars by guerrillas of the Zimbabwe African National Liberation Army. The guerrillas claimed to have badly damaged several of the airport's buildings as well as damaging or destroying a number of aircraft at the airport. However, the guerrillas’ claim was soon proved to be false, since when reporters visited the airport early in the morning they found that there was little to no damage done to any of the buildings and that the airport was fully operational. There was also no sign of any damaged or destroyed aircraft.
