= Victoria Falls Airport =

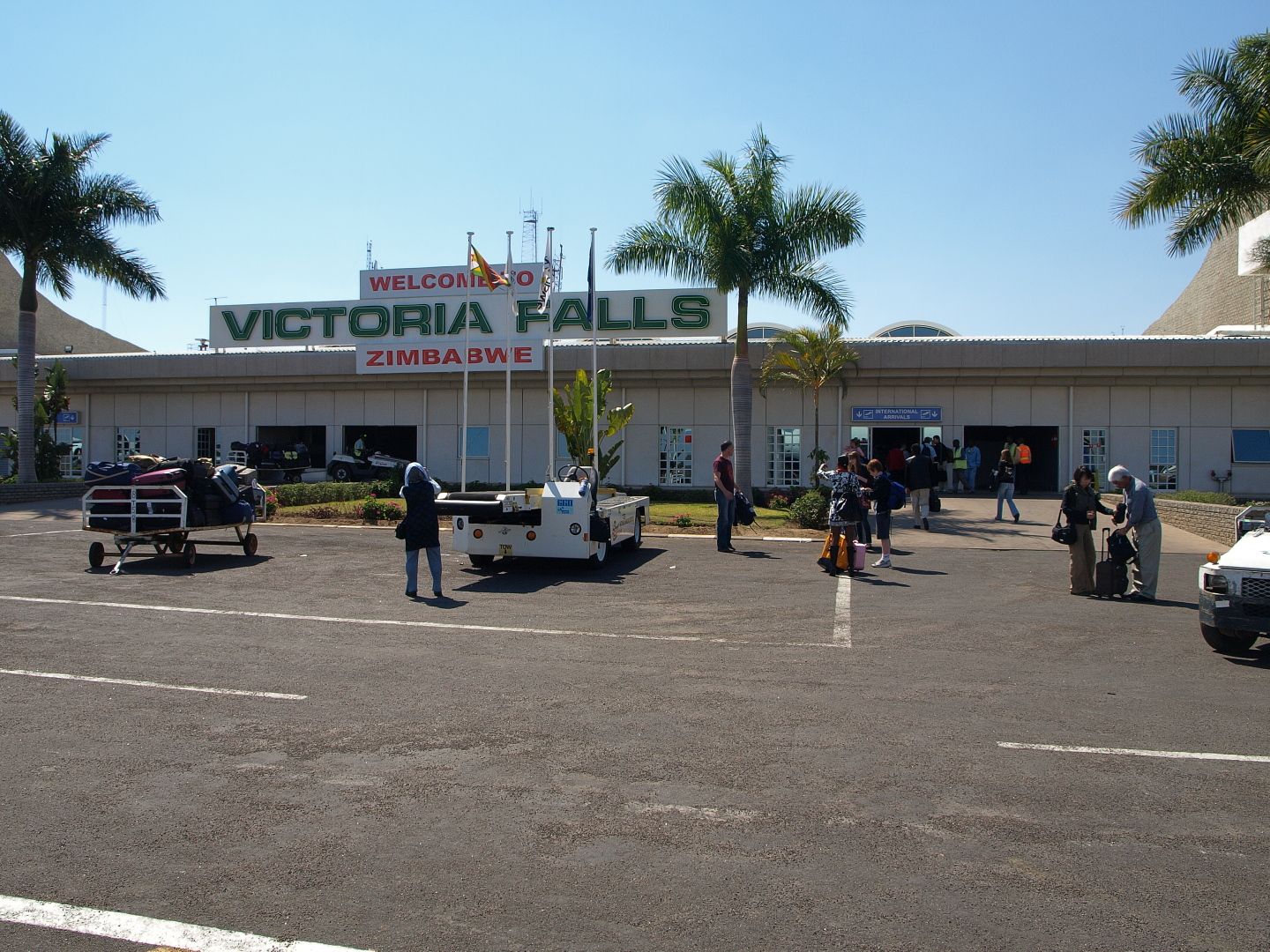
- IATA: VFA; ICAO: FVFA

Summary
- Airport type: Civil
- Operator: Civil Aviation Authority of Zimbabwe
- Serves: Victoria Falls
- Location: Victoria Falls, Zimbabwe
- Elevation AMSL: 3,490 ft (1,060 m)
- Coordinates: 18°05′45″S 25°50′20″E
- Website: https://www.acz.co.zw/airports/tour/victoria-falls-international-airport

Map
- Location in Zimbabwe

Runways
Direction	Length		Surface
Direction	m	ft	Surface
12/30	4,000	13,123	Asphalt
- Sources: GCM, WAD,

Victoria Falls Airport (IATA: VFA, ICAO: FVFA) is an international airport serving the Victoria Falls tourism industry, and is 18 kilometres (11 mi) south of the town of Victoria Falls, Zimbabwe.

== Overview ==
In April 2013, Exim Bank of China provided a $150 million loan to build the airport's new runway, taxiways and a new terminal to increase the airport's capacity from 500,000 to 1.7 million passengers annually.

The airport operates 24 hours per day, with immigration and customs services available. It offers facilities and services including aircraft parking, cargo and passenger handling, refuelling, weather information, restaurants, duty-free shops, and banking facilities. The airport has shuttle services to hotels and other places in town. There is a variety of tour operators and car rentals. The Zimbabwe Tourism Authority has an office stationed on the premises to assist travellers.

== Airlines and destinations ==
The following airlines operate regular scheduled and charter flights at Victoria Falls Airport:

Airlines	Destinations
Air Tanzania	Dar es Salaam
Air Zimbabwe	Bulawayo, Harare
Airlink	Cape Town, Johannesburg–O.R. Tambo, Mbombela
CemAir	Johannesburg–O.R. Tambo
Discover Airlines	Seasonal: Frankfurt, Windhoek–Hosea Kutako
Ethiopian Airlines	Addis Ababa
Fastjet Zimbabwe	Bulawayo, Harare, Hwange, Johannesburg–O.R. Tambo, Kariba, Maun, Mbombela
FlyNamibia	Windhoek–Hosea Kutako
FlySafair	Johannesburg–O. R. Tambo
Kenya Airways	Cape Town, Nairobi–Jomo Kenyatta
South African Airways	Johannesburg–O.R. Tambo

== See also ==
- Transport in Zimbabwe
- List of airports in Zimbabwe
