= Katwa (disambiguation) =

Katwa is a town in Bardhaman district of Indian state of West Bengal.

Katwa may also refer to:

- Katwa subdivision, West Bengal, India
- Katwa I (community development block)
- Katwa II (community development block)
- Katwa (Lok Sabha constituency)
- Katwa (Vidhan Sabha constituency)
- Katwa College, West Bengal, India
- Katwa Junction railway station
- Katwa, North Kivu, Democratic Republic of Congo

== See also ==
- Kotwa (disambiguation)
