= Hwange Town Airport =

Airport in Matabeleland North, Zimbabwe

- IATA: WKI; ICAO: FVWT

Summary
- Airport type: Public
- Serves: Hwange
- Elevation AMSL: 2,530 ft / 771 m
- Coordinates: 18°21′45″S 26°31′10″E

Map
- Location of the airport in Zimbabwe

Runways
Direction	Length		Surface
Direction	m	ft	Surface
08/26	1,520	4,987	Asphalt
- Sources: Google Maps GCM

Hwange Town Airport (IATA: WKI, ICAO: FVWT) is an airport serving Hwange, a mining town in Matabeleland North Province, Zimbabwe. The runway is adjacent to the town.

== See also ==
- Transport in Zimbabwe
- List of airports in Zimbabwe
