= 7Z (disambiguation) =

7z is a data compression and archival file format.

7z, 7Z, or 7-Z may also refer to:

- 7-Zip, an open source file archive software for 7z and other formats
- Clerget 7Z, a seven-cylinder rotary aircraft engine
- The IATA code for former airline Halcyonair
- The IATA code for current airline Ameristar Jet Charter

== See also ==
- Z7 (disambiguation)
