= Buffalo Range Airport =

Airport in Zimbabwe

- IATA: BFO; ICAO: FVCZ

Summary
- Airport type: Public / military
- Serves: Chiredzi
- Built: 1976
- Elevation AMSL: 1,421 ft / 433 m
- Coordinates: 21°00′29″S 31°34′43″E

Map
- Location of the airport in Zimbabwe

Runways
| Direction | Length | | Surface |
| Direction | m | ft | Surface |
|---|---|---|---|
| 14/32 | 1,763 | 5,785 | Bituminous |
- Sources: World Aero Data

Buffalo Range Airport (IATA: BFO, ICAO: FVCZ), designated as Forward Air Field 7 (FAF) during the Rhodesian Bush War, is an airport serving Chiredzi, Masvingo Province, Zimbabwe. It is 10 kilometres (6.2 mi) northwest of the town.

== History ==
Chiredzi Air Force based was opened in c1976. It was large enough for operations involving the Douglas C-47 by September 1979. Around the early 1980s, runway 14/32 opened replacing the older runway, and it was converted for use as a taxiway. These upgrades were to enlargen the airport to strategic airfield status. Upgrades of the existing facilities were not carried out. As of 2004, it is a joint public-military airfield housing the School of Military Training.

== Facilities ==
The Chiredzi non-directional beacon (Ident: CZ) is located 3.75 nautical miles (6.95 km) off the threshold of runway 14. The Chiredzi or Buffalo Range non-directional beacon (Ident: BI) is located on the field.

== Accidents and incidents ==
- 6 January 1977: A Rhodesian Air Force Douglas C-47B, tail number R7034, hit overhead conveyor steel cables, across the Lundi River on return from Malapati airfield, crashing and killing three occupants, pilot, co-pilot and Despatcher. Three Despatcher passengers survived.

== See also ==
- Chiredzi District
- List of airports in Zimbabwe
- Transport in Zimbabwe
