= Masvingo Airport =

- IATA: MVZ; ICAO: FVMV

Summary
- Airport type: Public
- Operator: Government
- Location: Masvingo, Zimbabwe
- Elevation AMSL: 3,595 ft (1,096 m)
- Coordinates: 20°03′20″S 30°51′30″E

Map
- Location in Zimbabwe

Runways
Direction	Length		Surface
Direction	m	ft	Surface
17/35	1,726	5,663	Asphalt
10/28	1,200	3,937	Grass
- Sources: WAD GCM Google Maps

Masvingo Airport (IATA: MVZ, ICAO: FVMV) is an airport serving Masvingo, the capital of Masvingo Province in Zimbabwe. The runway is 3 kilometres (1.9 mi) east of the city. It is mainly used for small chartered aircraft or by military aircraft.

The Masvingo VOR-DME (Ident: VMV) is located on the field. The Masvingo non-directional beacon (Ident: VI) is 0.6 nautical miles (1.1 km) off the threshold of runway 17.

== See also ==
- Transport in Zimbabwe
- List of airports in Zimbabwe
