= SAIC Z7 =

Battery electric full-size sedan and shooting brake

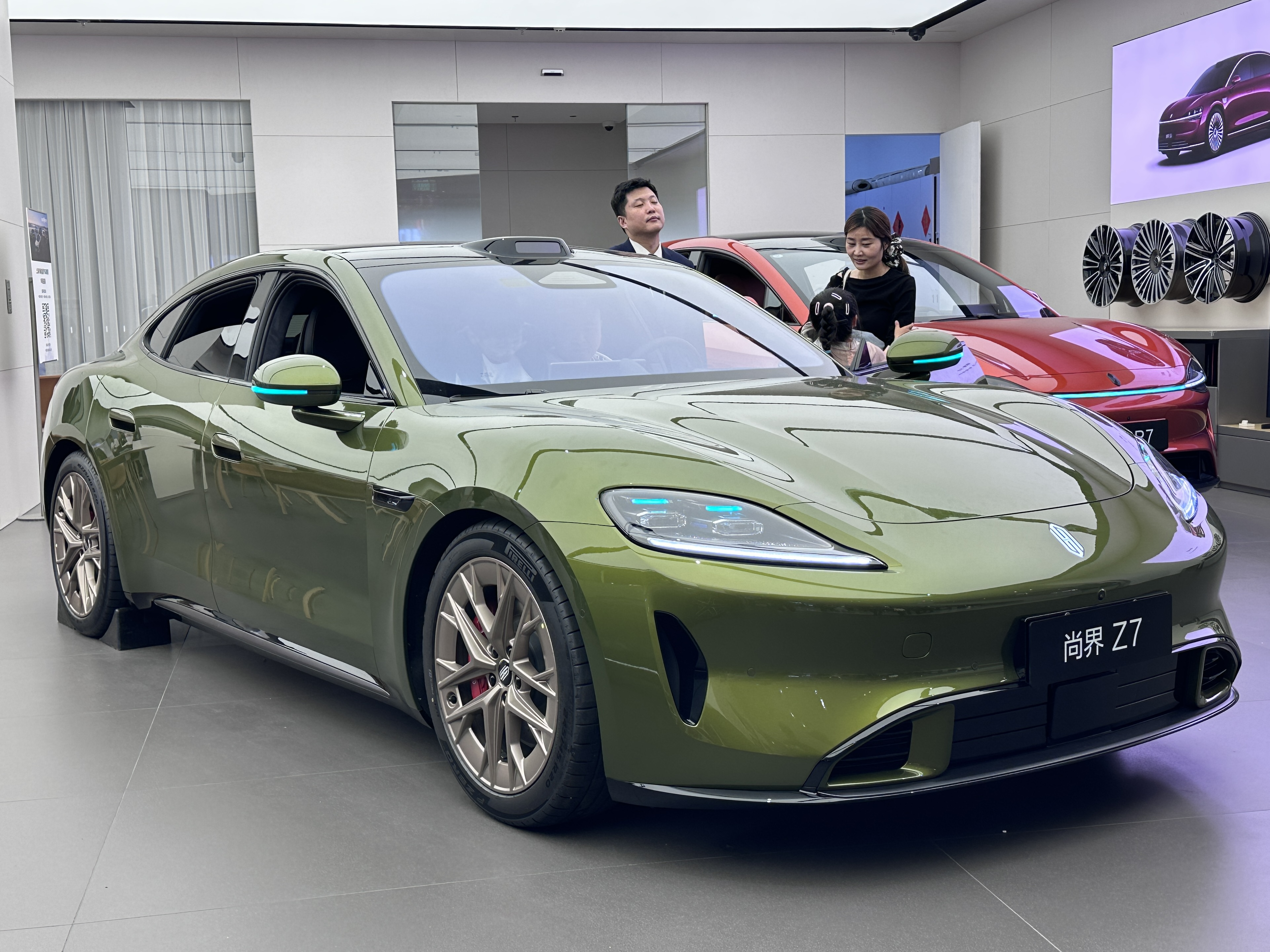

Overview
- Manufacturer: SAIC Motor
- Also called: SAIC Z7T (wagon)
- Production: 2026–present
- Assembly: China: Shanghai

Body and chassis
- Class: Full-size car (E)
- Body style: 4-door sedan; 5-door shooting brake (Z7T)
- Layout: Rear-motor, rear-wheel-drive; Dual-motor, all-wheel-drive
- Platform: Tuling Platform
- Related: SAIC Z9

Powertrain
- Battery: 81 kWh LFP; 100 kWh Li-ion
- Range: Up to 562 miles (904 km)

Dimensions
- Wheelbase: 3,000 mm (118.1 in)
- Length: 5,036 mm (198.3 in)
- Width: 1,976 mm (77.8 in)
- Height: 1,465 mm (57.7 in)
- Curb weight: 2,260 kg (4,982 lb)

The SAIC Z7 (Chinese: 尚界Z7; pinyin: Shàngjiè Z7) is a battery electric full-size sedan produced by SAIC Motor and sold under the SAIC marque that is part of the Harmony Intelligent Mobility Alliance. A shooting brake version is sold as the SAIC Z7T (Chinese: 尚界Z7T; pinyin: Shàngjiè Z7T).

== History ==
During an interview on December 9, 2025, SAIC Motor chairman Wang Xiaoqiu mentioned that the SAIC marque would be launching two new models in 2026. The Z7 is the first of those two new models and the announcement made regarding the new models was made on the same day that the H5 reached 20,000 sales. It will launch in the first quarter of 2026. Spyshots of a shooting brake version were also seen around the same time the teasers were shown.

Teasers of the Z7 were posted onto Weibo on January 7, 2026. On February 28, 2026, SAIC confirmed that the Z7 will use Huawei's Tuling Platform instead of SAIC Motor's Xingyun (Nebula) platform.

The Z7 and Z7T has been officially started pre-orders and pre-sales in China on March 23, 2026.

=== Design ===
English and Chinese websites have compared the design to the Porsche Taycan and Xiaomi SU7. The Z7 uses front fascia and headlight designs similar to that of the H5, and instead of using lettering on the back like other HIMA vehicles, the Z7 uses a SAIC logo, as with the H5, and features a full-width rear light bar. Semi-hidden door handles are present.

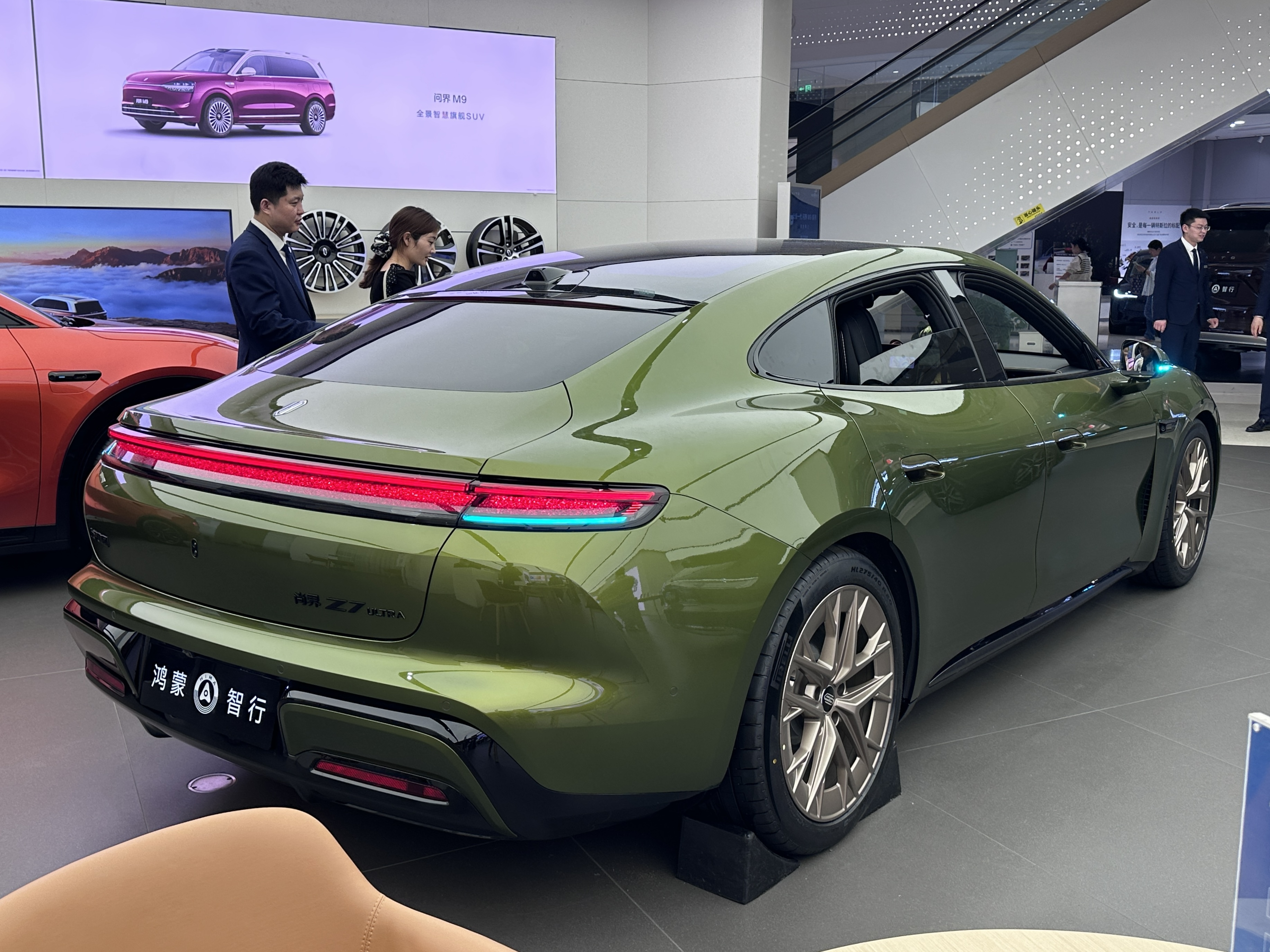
Rear view

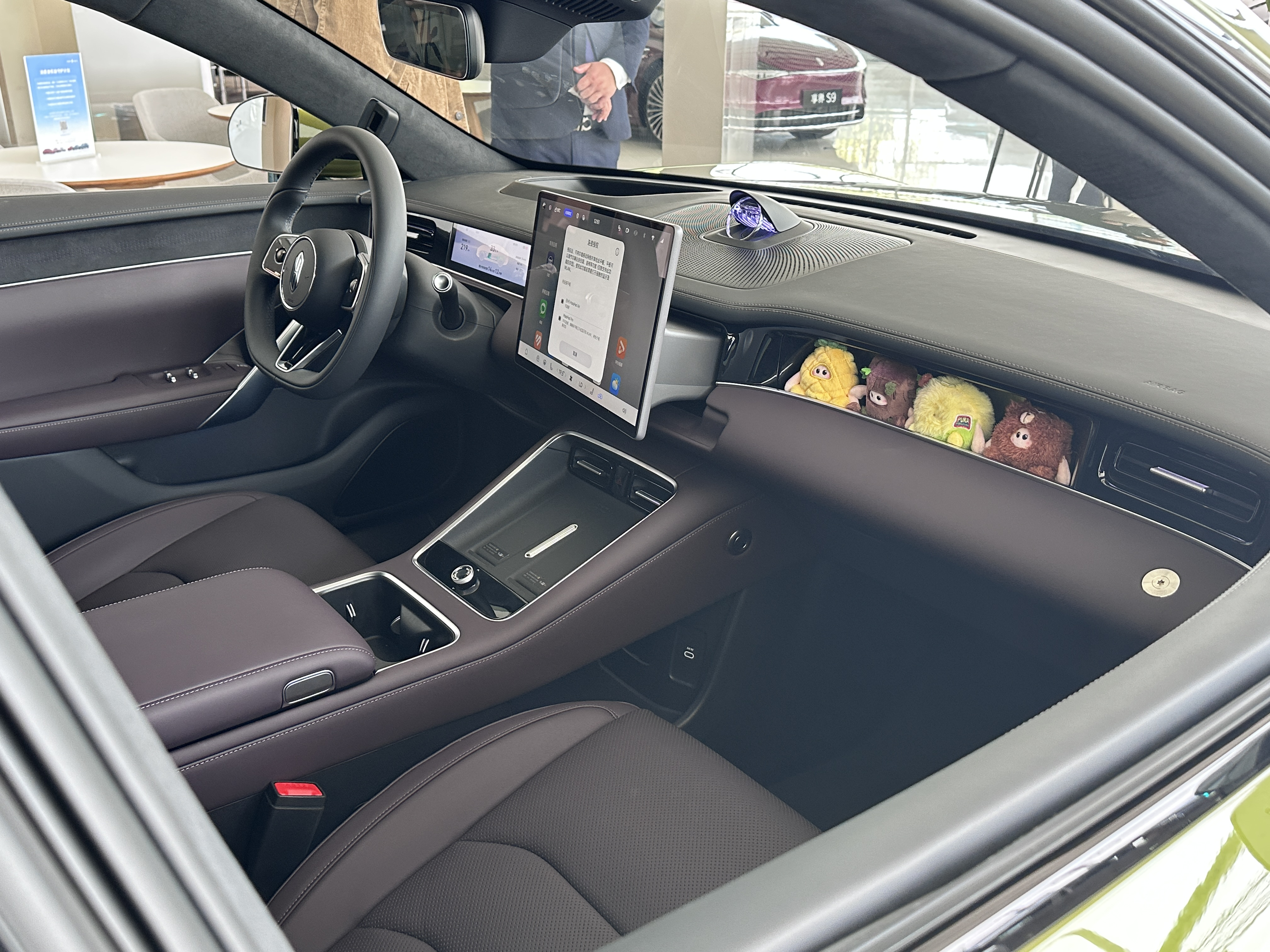
Inteior

=== Features ===
A LiDAR will come with the Z7, as confirmed by the teasers posted onto Weibo. The interior uses a three-spoke steering wheel and a narrow digital instrument cluster. The Z7 also uses a 4D Sunflower screen that can automatically tilt to the driver. The "Star River" taillight previously exclusive to the Maextro S800 and the 9-series HIMA cars is also used on the Z7, making it the first non-9-series HIMA car to do so. Semi-hidden door handles are utilized. Dot-matrix light sources are embedded within the headlamp cavities.

== SAIC Z7T ==
On March 4, 2026, SAIC revealed the first images of the Z7T shooting brake (stylized as Z7T). Compared to the sedan version it uses a rounded rear end and a sloping roofline. The interior was also revealed on the same day. This model also resembles the silhouette of a Taycan Sport Turismo.

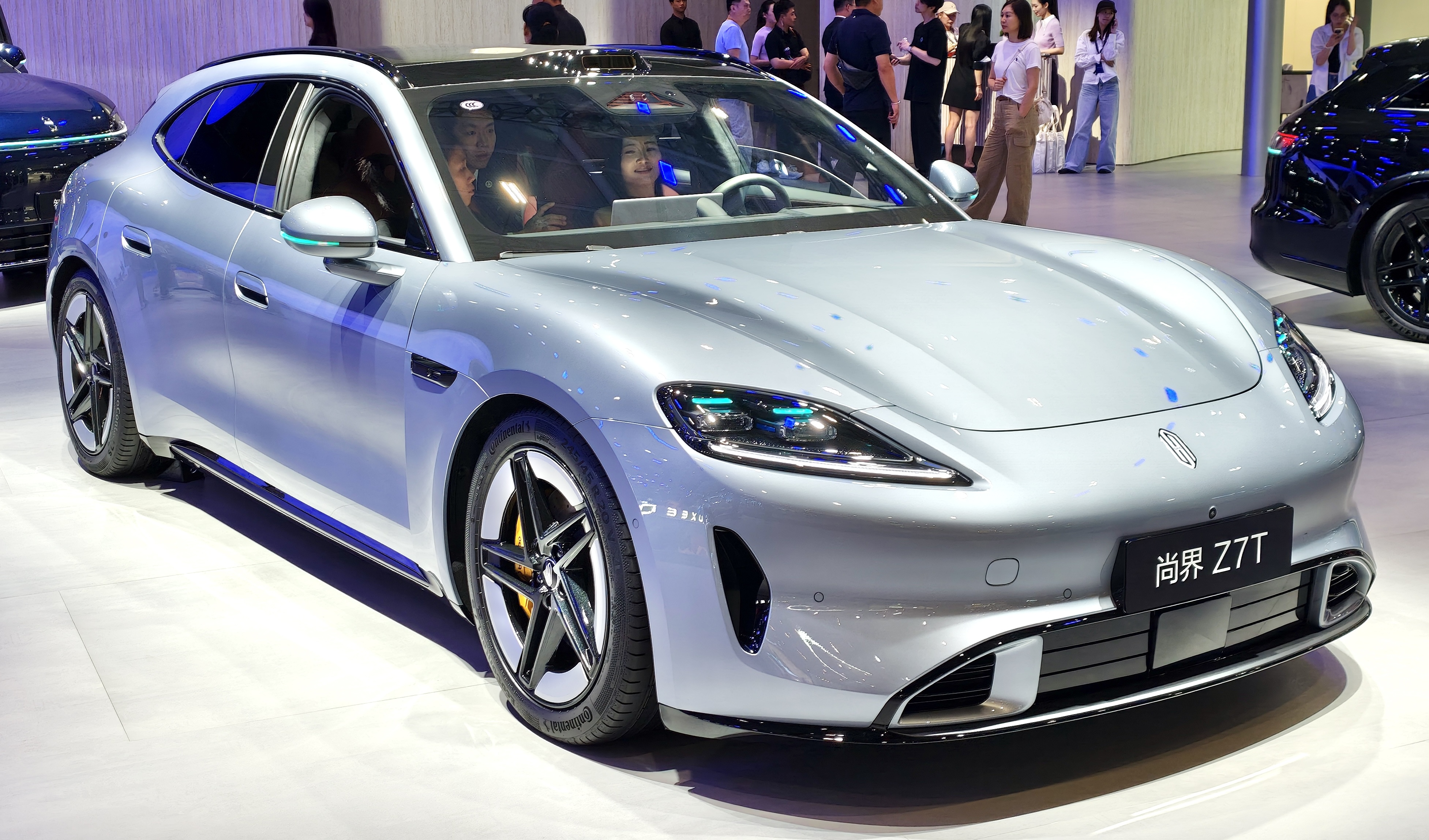
SAIC Z7T

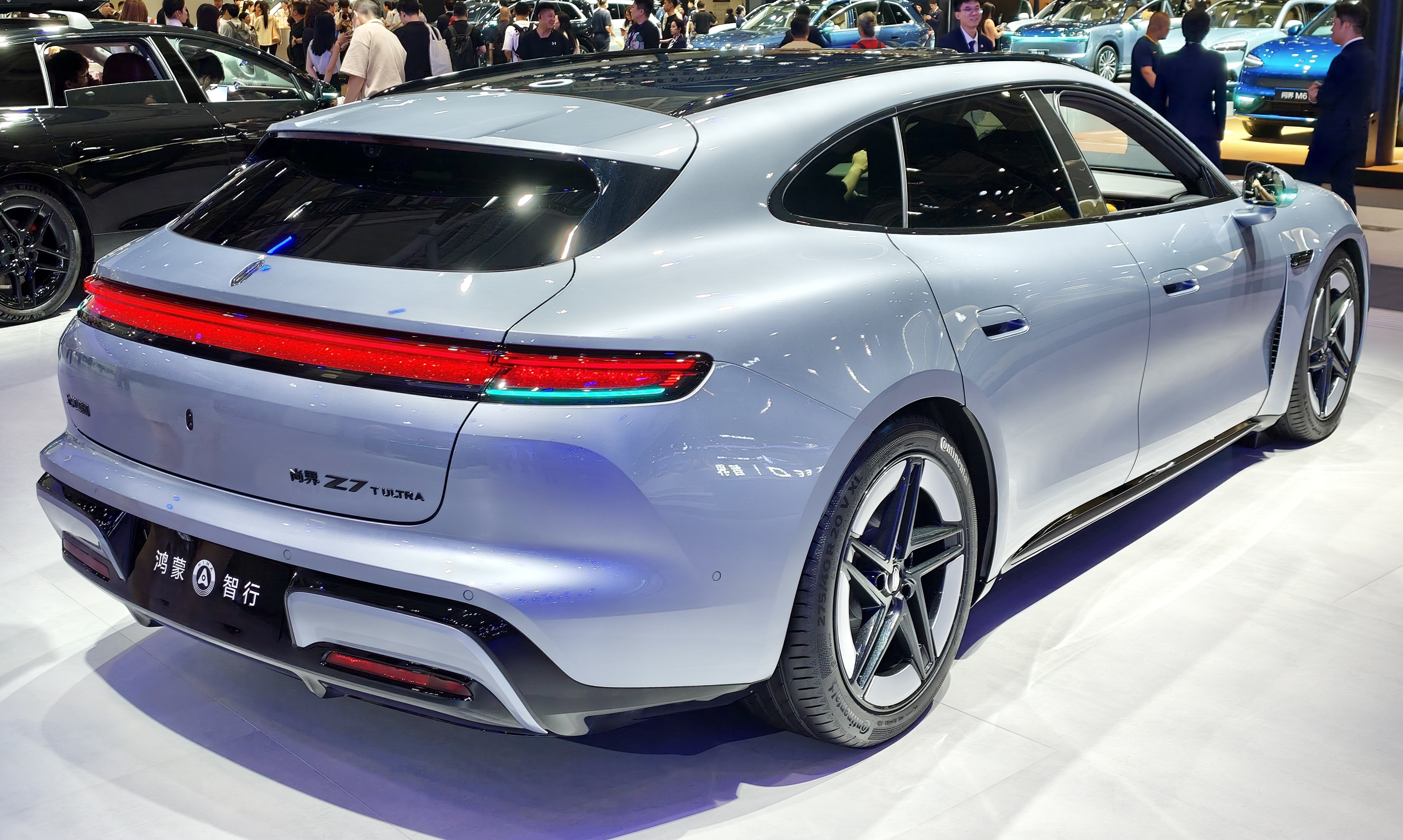
Rear view

== Powertrain and chassis ==
Huawei's Tuling Platform with air suspension will be utilized double wishbone suspension at the front and multilink at the rear.

Depending on the variant, the Z7 comes with an 81 kWh lithium iron phosphate battery and a 100 kWh ternary lithium battery. Max and Ultra versions get the 100 kWh battery while the standard version uses the 81 kWh battery. The rear-wheel-drive Max model gets up to 562 miles (904 km) of range. The rear-wheel-drive models produce 354 horsepower (264 kW; 359 PS) and all wheel drive models add an additional 228 horsepower (170 kW; 231 PS) front motor bringing the total horsepower to 582 horsepower (434 kW; 590 PS) for the all-wheel-drive model.
