= Mudzi District =

District in Zimbabwe

Coordinates: 17°00′S 032°40′E

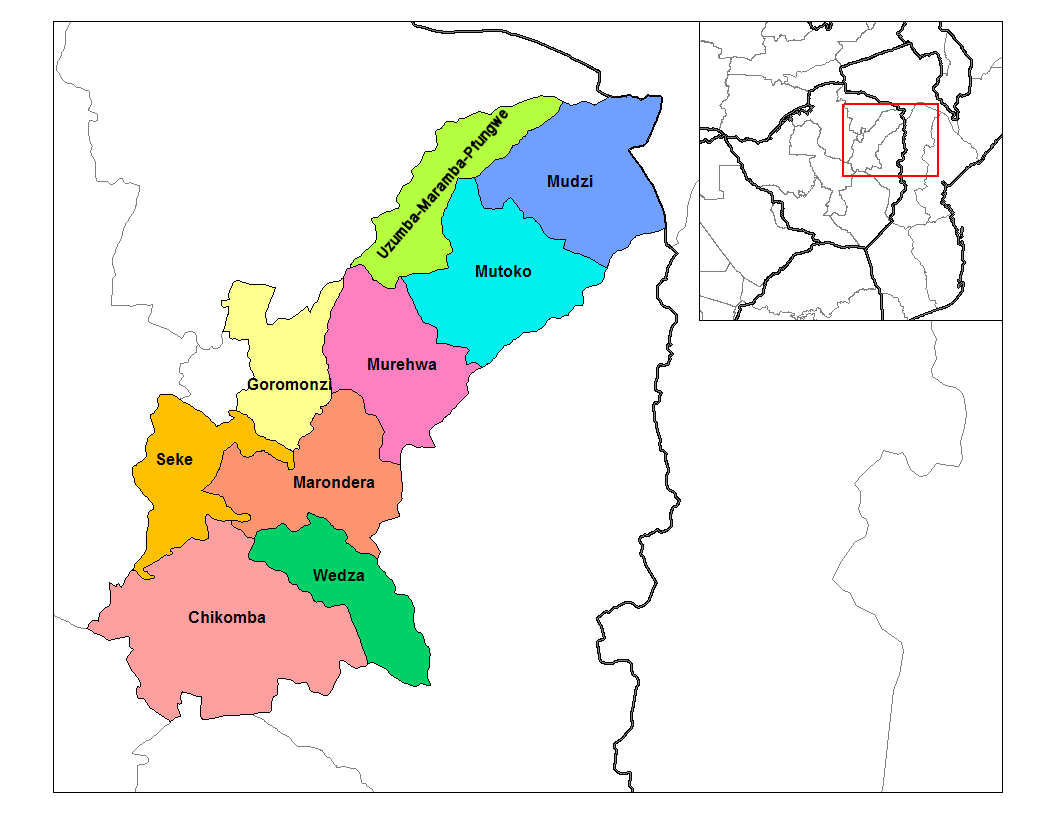
Map of the districts of Mashonaland East, Mudzi is in the top right in light blue

Mudzi District is a district of Mashonaland East Province, Zimbabwe, in southern Africa. It is located in the far eastern part of Zimbabwe. It covers 4,075 square kilometres (1,573 sq mi), all of which is communal land. As of the 2022 census, the district had a population of 158,478, this is up only slightly from the 135,378 of the 2002 census and reflects emigration due to the poverty of the district. It has a single main road, A2, that runs from the town of Mutoko in Mutoko District in the southwest through the district, past the villages of Chifamba, Mudzi, Chingwena, Masarakufa, Nyamuwanga, the town of Kotwa, and the village of Muzezuru to the town of Nyamapanda before entering Mozambique to the northeast.

As of the 2008 delimitation, Mudzi District had seventeen administrative wards formed into three parliamentary constituencies, and one designated growth centre at Kotwa. As of 2008 the Mudzi West constituency covered the Shanga, Suswe, Mudzi, Musarakufa and Chiunye areas; the Mudzi South constituency covered Katsande, Nyamatawa, Chikwizo, Gozi and Makana areas; and the Mudzi North constituency covered the Nyamurapa, Kondo, Dendera, Kotwa, and Goromonzi areas and the border town of Nyamapanda.

Rivers in Mudzi District include the Mudzi and Rwenya.
