= SAIC (marque) =

Chinese car brand

- Product type: Electric cars
- Current owner: SAIC Motor and Huawei
- Produced by: SAIC Motor
- Country: China
- Introduced: April 2025; 1 year ago
- Related brands: AITO (Seres); Luxeed (Chery); Stelato (BAIC BluePark); Maextro (JAC Group)
- Ambassadors: Wang Xiaoqiu (Chairman of the Board of Directors of SAIC Motor); Yu Chengdong (Chairman of Huawei Consumer BG)
- Website: hima.auto/shangjie

Chinese name
- Simplified Chinese: 尚界
Transcriptions
Standard Mandarin
- Hanyu Pinyin: Shàngjiè

SAIC (Chinese: 尚界汽车; pinyin: Shàngjiè Qìchē), commonly known as Shangjie, is a Chinese electric vehicle brand established in 2025 by SAIC Motor. It is part of Huawei's HIMA multi-brand collaboration model, where Huawei handles product creation and design, provides technologies such as full-stack ADAS solutions and infotainment systems. It is named after SAIC Motor, who manufactures cars for the SAIC marque.

English websites often refer to SAIC as Shangjie to differentiate the marque and SAIC Motor.

== History ==
In April 2025, Yu Chengdong (Richard Yu), revealed in an interview that the fifth HIMA brand, developed in collaboration with SAIC Motor, which would be named Shangjie (尚界) in Chinese. The brand targets younger audience, and positioned as the most affordable among other HIMA brands. It occupies the mainstream market below the 200,000 yuan price segment.

SAIC Motor invested 6 billion yuan and deployed over 5,000 engineers to integrate Huawei's systems and components into the planned model, internally codenamed ES39. The company also invested in a 'super factory' mirrored after Seres super factory in Chongqing that produces AITO models.

Teasers of its first product, the SAIC H5, were first shown in July 2025. The H5 went on sale in September 2025. Shortly after the launch event, HIMA announced that the SAIC H5 secured over 10,000 firm orders within the first hour. SAIC targets a monthly sales of 20,000 vehicles for the H5.

SAIC Motor and Huawei's dedicated platform, which will be used by the SAIC marque, will not be used in any models until the brand's second model is complete. The brand's third model will be the first to be based on the new co-developed platform. It was announced on October 27, 2025 that both upcoming models for the brand are crossover SUVs.

Teasers of the marque's second product, the SAIC Z7, were first shown by the brand via Weibo on January 7, 2026. The announcement of the Z7 contradicts the October 2025 announcement regarding the marque's two upcoming models.

== Products ==
=== Current models ===
SAIC vehicles

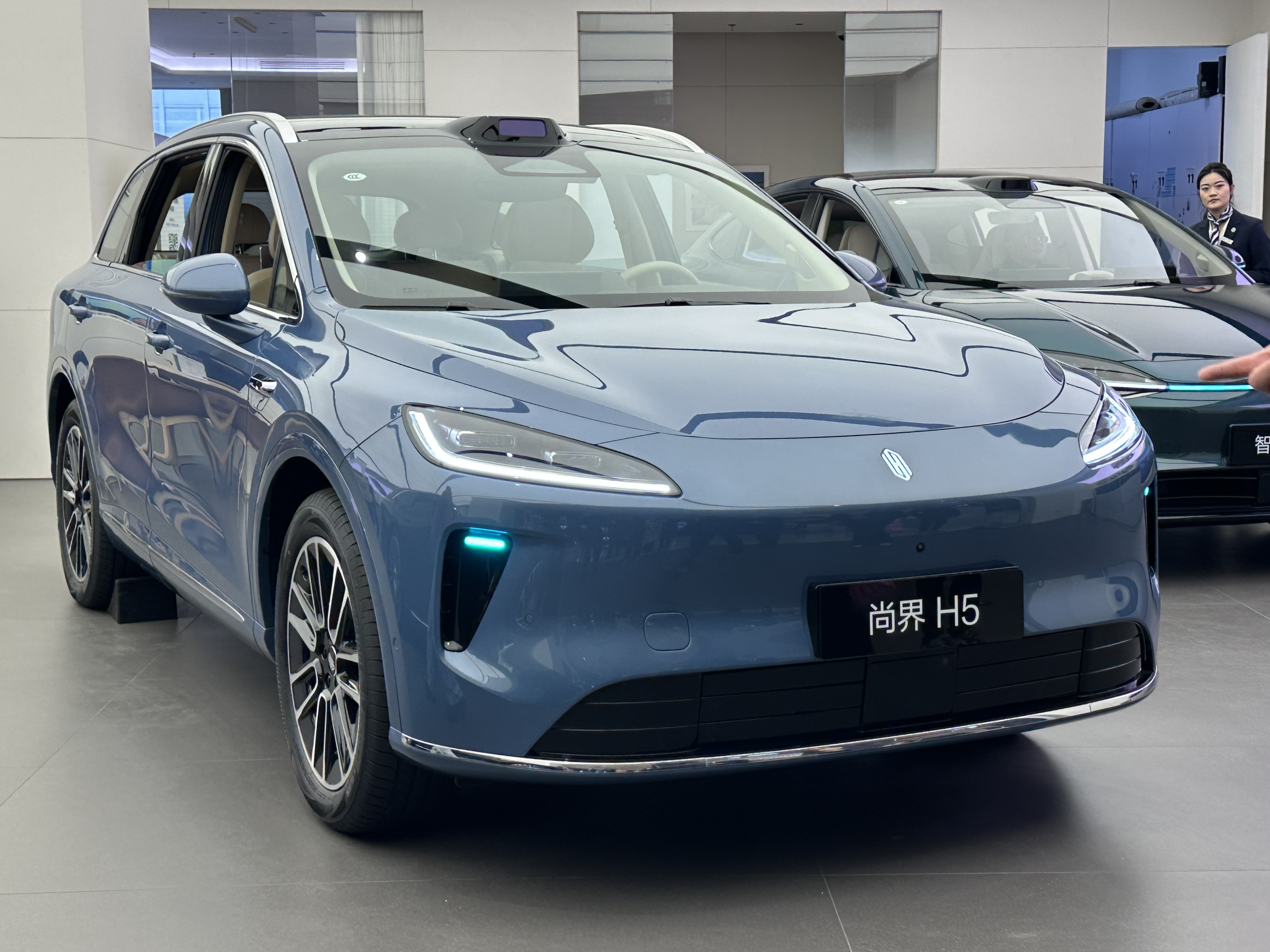
H5 (2025–present), mid-size SUV, BEV–EREV

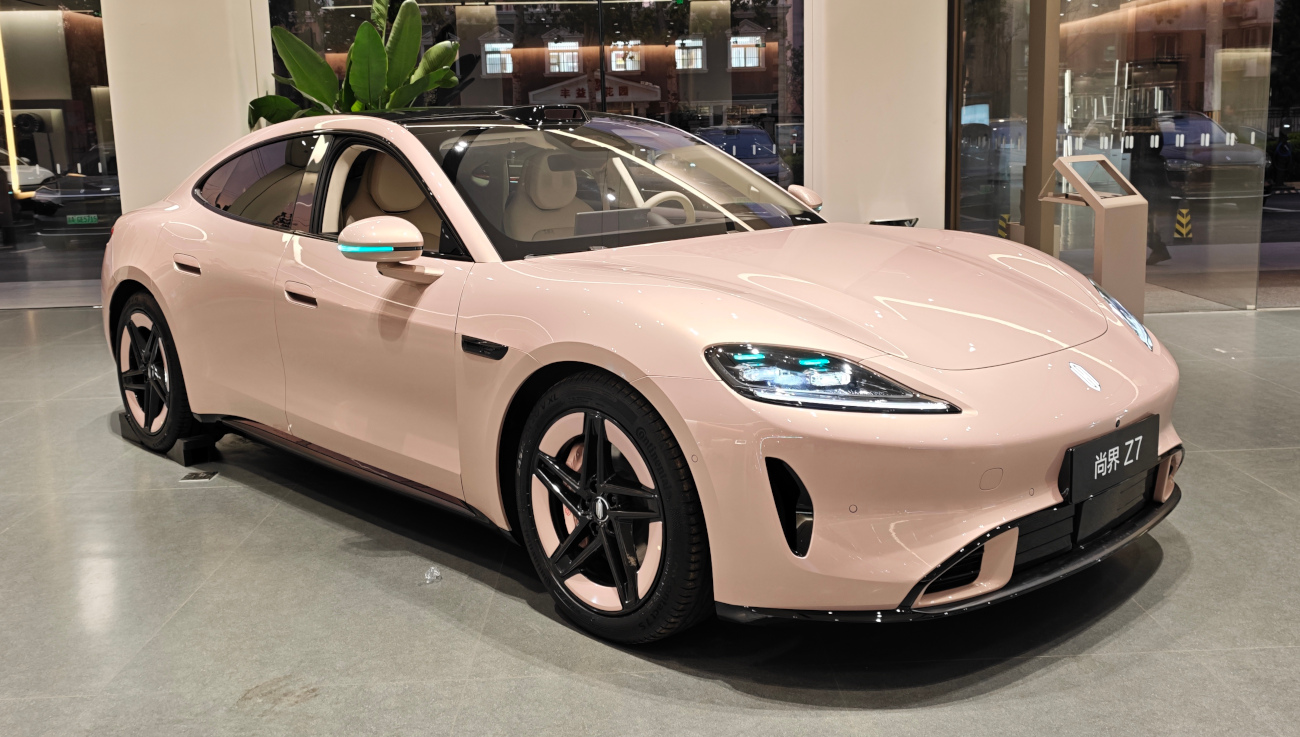
Z7 (2026–present), full-size sedan, BEV–EREV

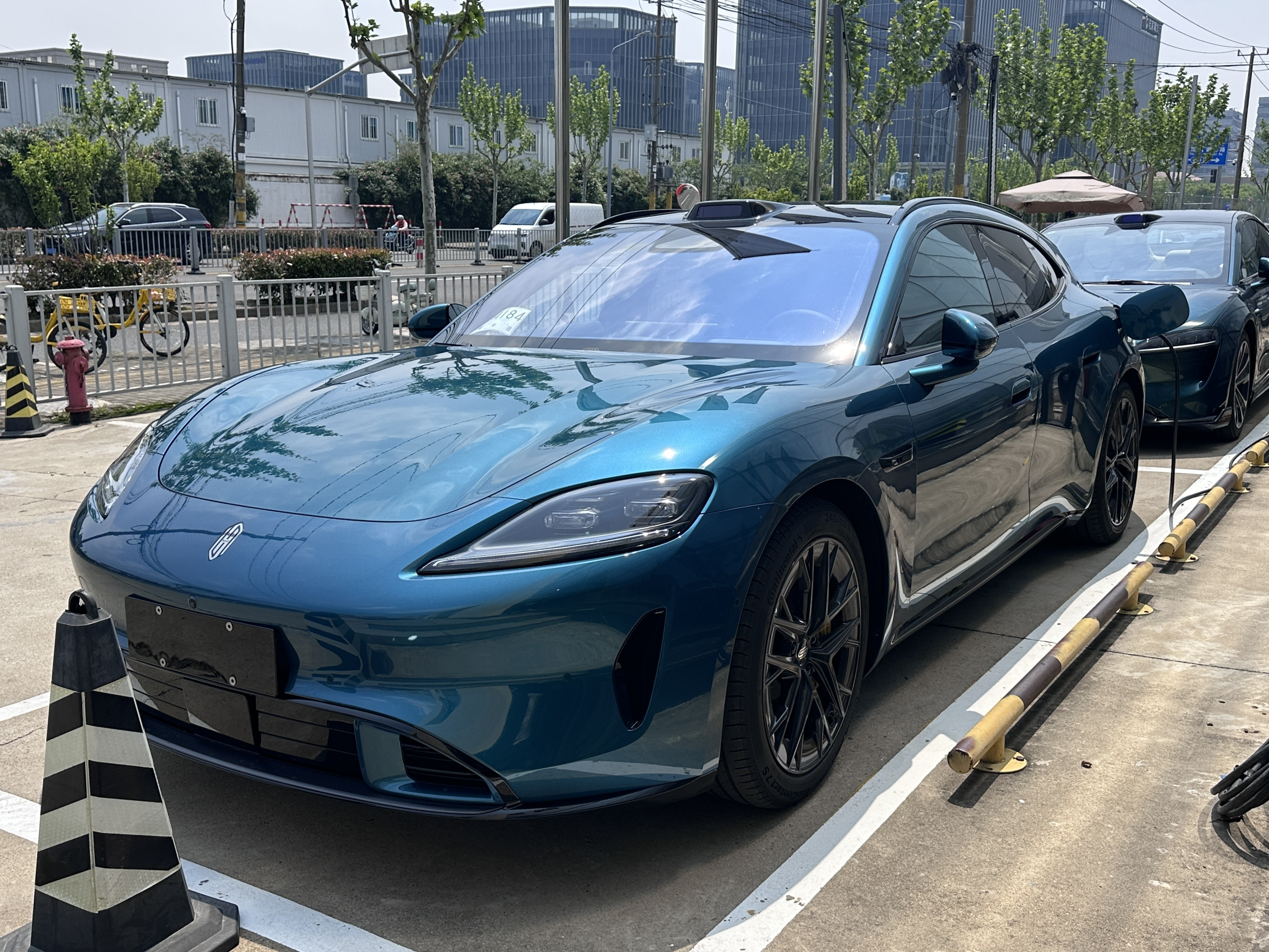
Z7T (2026–present), full-size shooting brake, BEV–EREV

== See also ==
- Harmony intelligence Mobility Alliance
- SAIC Motor
- AITO (marque)
- Luxeed
- Stelato
- Maextro
- Automobile manufacturers and brands of China
- List of automobile manufacturers of China
