= Mutare West =

- Constituency for the National Assembly of Zimbabwe
- Province: Manicaland
- Region: Mutare District

Current constituency
- Number of members: 1
- Party: ZANU–PF
- Member(s): Nyasha Marange

Mutare West is a constituency represented in the National Assembly of the Parliament of Zimbabwe, located in Manicaland Province. Its current MP since the 2023 general election is Nyasha Marange of ZANU–PF.

== Electoral history ==
The candidate of the ZANU–PF was declared the winner in the March 2005 parliamentary election, despite irregularities. In the March 2008 parliamentary election, Movement for Democratic Change candidate Shuah Mudiwa very narrowly won the seat, receiving 7,597 votes against 7,577 votes for Chris Mushohwe, the Minister of Transport and Communications, according to official results. Mushowe despite losing the parliamentary seat was elevated to the level of provincial Governor. An independent candidate, Gideon Chamuka, received 536 votes.

In the 2018 election, Teedzai Muchimwe of ZANU–PF was elected to represent the constituency.

== See also ==
- List of Zimbabwean parliamentary constituencies
