= Grand Reef Airport =

Airport in Manicaland, Zimbabwe

- IATA: none; ICAO: FVGR

Summary
- Airport type: Public
- Serves: Mutare
- Elevation AMSL: 3,344 ft / 1,019 m
- Coordinates: 18°58′35″S 32°27′00″E

Map
- Location of the airport in Zimbabwe

Runways
Direction	Length		Surface
Direction	ft	m	Surface
05/23	4,080	1,243	Asphalt
- Sources: GCM Google Maps

Grand Reef Airport (ICAO: FVGR), designated as Forward Air Field 8 (FAF) during the Rhodesian Bush War, is one of two airports serving the city of Mutare, in Manicaland Province, Zimbabwe. The Grand Reef Airport runway is 20 kilometres (12 mi) west of Mutare Airport, which is adjacent to the city.

== History ==
Grand Reef Airport was established in c1977 as a forward air field for the Royal Rhodesian Air Force (RRAF). It was equipped with a tarmac runway.

== Facilities ==
The Grand Reef non-directional beacon (Ident: GR) is located on the field.

== See also ==
- Transport in Zimbabwe
- List of airports in Zimbabwe
