= Kotwa, Prayagraj =

Village in Uttar Pradesh, India

Kotwa is a village in Prayagraj, Uttar Pradesh, India.

The village has its own varied historical significance influenced by its cultural, educational and political associations. Kotwa is the region promptly known for 'Bais Rajputs' of Suryavanshi Lineage. Though Kotwa has been a democratic and independent village since the eve of independence, the most influential and respected family that still has its roots there, are the 'PAKKI PARIVAAR'.

The last prominent personality that ever lived and ruled many hearts was - Thakur Anuj Pratap Singh of 'PAKKI'.

The historical artifacts found and read after the 'Revolt of 1857' had some impactful mentions of Kotwa and its people.

'1857 क्रांति की साक्षी पक्की हवेली....'titled documents are still available in some old repositories and testaments. Many known newspapers of our pre independent period had publications made, which had mentions of the pertinence of 'Pakki' aKa Thakur Navneet Singh's Haveli during the revolutionary movement of 1857.

Thakur Navneet Singh is also recognised as one of the freedom fighters who took part valiantly during the revolt of 1857.
