= Robert Gabriel Mugabe International Airport =

International airport serving Harare, Zimbabwe

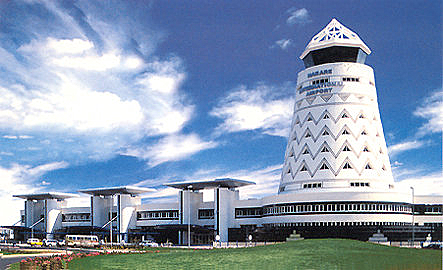
- IATA: HRE; ICAO: FVRG

Summary
- Airport type: Public/Military
- Operator: Airports Company of Zimbabwe
- Serves: Harare, Zimbabwe
- Hub for: Air Zimbabwe; Fastjet Zimbabwe
- Elevation AMSL: 4,887 ft (1,490 m)
- Coordinates: 17°55′54.5″S 31°05′34.25″E
- Website: caaz.co.zw

Map
- Location of the airport in Zimbabwe

Runways
Direction	Length		Surface
Direction	m	ft	Surface
05/23	4,725	15,500	Asphalt/Concrete

Statistics (2025)
- Passengers: 1,652,432

Robert Gabriel Mugabe International Airport (IATA: HRE, ICAO: FVRG, formerly FVHA), (known colloquially as RGM or Harare Airport) and formerly known as Harare International Airport and Salisbury Airport, is an international airport serving Harare, the capital of Zimbabwe. It is the largest airport in the country and serves as the base of Air Zimbabwe, the national flag carrier. It is operated by the Airports Company of Zimbabwe.

== History ==
Commissioned in 1956 and officially opened on 5 February 1957, Salisbury Airport cost £924,000 to build. According to the 1950 report of the Director of Civil Aviation, the city's original aerodrome, Belvedere Airport, had proved to be inadequate and had to be abandoned for the following reasons:

- the runway was some 45° out of alignment, given that approaching aircraft had to enter through a gap in Warren Hills;
- because of the skewed align, aircraft were forced to take-off over the city centre, which posed a real danger of accidents;
- the growing number of high-rise buildings in the city, particularly Milton Building, posed a risk to aircraft;
- Belvedere Airport had been built to accommodate the RAF Elementary Flying Training School, so the layout and design of the buildings were not particularly suitable for commercial aviation.

A site therefore had to be found for the construction of an airport that would be safer and more suitable for commercial activities.

Originally, it was anticipated that the airport would be completed by 1954. It was, however, not completed until two years later, because the government ran out of funds in October 1952 and had to suspend the project temporarily. The new Salisbury Airport was finally commissioned on 1 July 1956 by the Government of Rhodesia and Nyasaland. The cost of building the airport was £924,000.

The airport was attacked with mortar bombs by the Zimbabwe African National Liberation Army during the 1979 Attack on Salisbury Airport, but remained unscathed after the attack.

On 18 April 1980, South Rhodesia was officially renamed as Zimbabwe, following its internationally recognised independence from the United Kingdom.

As a result of internal political conflicts since 2000, there has been a decline in tourists to Zimbabwe prior to the country's withdrawal from the Commonwealth of Nations three years later. Consequently, there are only two non-African airlines that serve the country: Emirates and Qatar Airways. Formerly British Airways, KLM, Lufthansa, Swissair, Qantas and Air France all served Harare International Airport for many years.

On 9 November 2017, Harare International Airport was officially, and controversially, renamed after the second President of Zimbabwe, Robert Mugabe (1924–2019), to Robert Gabriel Mugabe International Airport, a decision that was announced earlier in September 2017 and sparked a controversy, as many Zimbabweans felt that too many places in the country had already been renamed after Mugabe.

== Facilities ==
Air Rhodesia established its headquarters at the airport in 1967, and since Zimbabwean independence in 1980, Air Rhodesia's successor, Air Zimbabwe, has maintained the status quo with its head office located at the airport as well. The regulatory authority the Civil Aviation Authority of Zimbabwe has its head office on level 3 of the new International Terminal.

In August 2018, Boeing announced that it was in negotiations with Zimbabwean authorities to establish a regional hub for Boeing aeroplanes for providing training and expert technical services at the airport.

== Airlines and destinations ==
Airlines	Destinations
Air Zimbabwe	Dar es Salaam, London–Gatwick
Airlink	Cape Town, Durban, Johannesburg–Lanseria (begins 15 November 2026), Johannesburg–O. R. Tambo
CemAir	Johannesburg–O. R. Tambo
Emirates	Dubai–International (Note: This flight operates via Lusaka. However, this carrier does not have rights to transport passengers solely between Harare and Lusaka.)
Eswatini Air	Manzini
Ethiopian Airlines	Addis Ababa
Etihad Airways	Abu Dhabi (begins 24 March 2027)
Fastjet Zimbabwe	Bulawayo, Johannesburg–O. R. Tambo, Victoria Falls
FlySafair	Johannesburg–O. R. Tambo
Kenya Airways	Lusaka, Nairobi–Jomo Kenyatta
Qatar Airways	Doha (Note: This flight operates via Lusaka or continues to Lusaka on the same flight number. However, this carrier does not have rights to transport passengers solely between Harare and Lusaka or vice versa.)
RwandAir	Kigali
South African Airways	Johannesburg–O. R. Tambo
Uganda Airlines	Entebbe^{b}

=== Cargo ===
Airlines	Destinations
Astral Aviation	Nairobi–Jomo Kenyatta

== Accidents and incidents ==
- In July 1984, Vickers Viscount Z-YNI of Air Zimbabwe was damaged beyond economic repair in an accident on the ground. It was withdrawn from use as a result and passed to the airport's fire department for use as a training aid.
- On 20 September 1987, Douglas C-47A Z-WRJ of Crest Breeders crashed shortly after take-off following a loss of power from the starboard engine. The aircraft was on a cargo flight. All three crew survived.
- On 3 November 2009, Air Zimbabwe Xian MA60 performing flight UM-239 hit five warthogs on take-off. The take-off was rejected but the undercarriage collapsed, causing substantial damage to the aircraft.
