= Civil Aviation Authority of Zimbabwe =

Civil Aviation Authority of Zimbabwe (CAAZ)
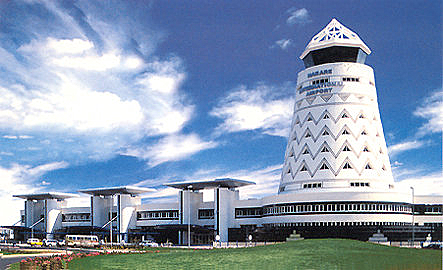
- The Harare International Airport houses the head office of the CAAZ

Agency overview
- Formed: January 1, 1999
- Preceding agency: Department of Civil Aviation
- Headquarters: Level 3, Harare International Airport; 17°55′55″S 31°05′34″E
- Parent department: Government of Zimbabwe
- Website: www.caaz.co.zw

Footnotes
- Sources: CAAZ, World Aero Data

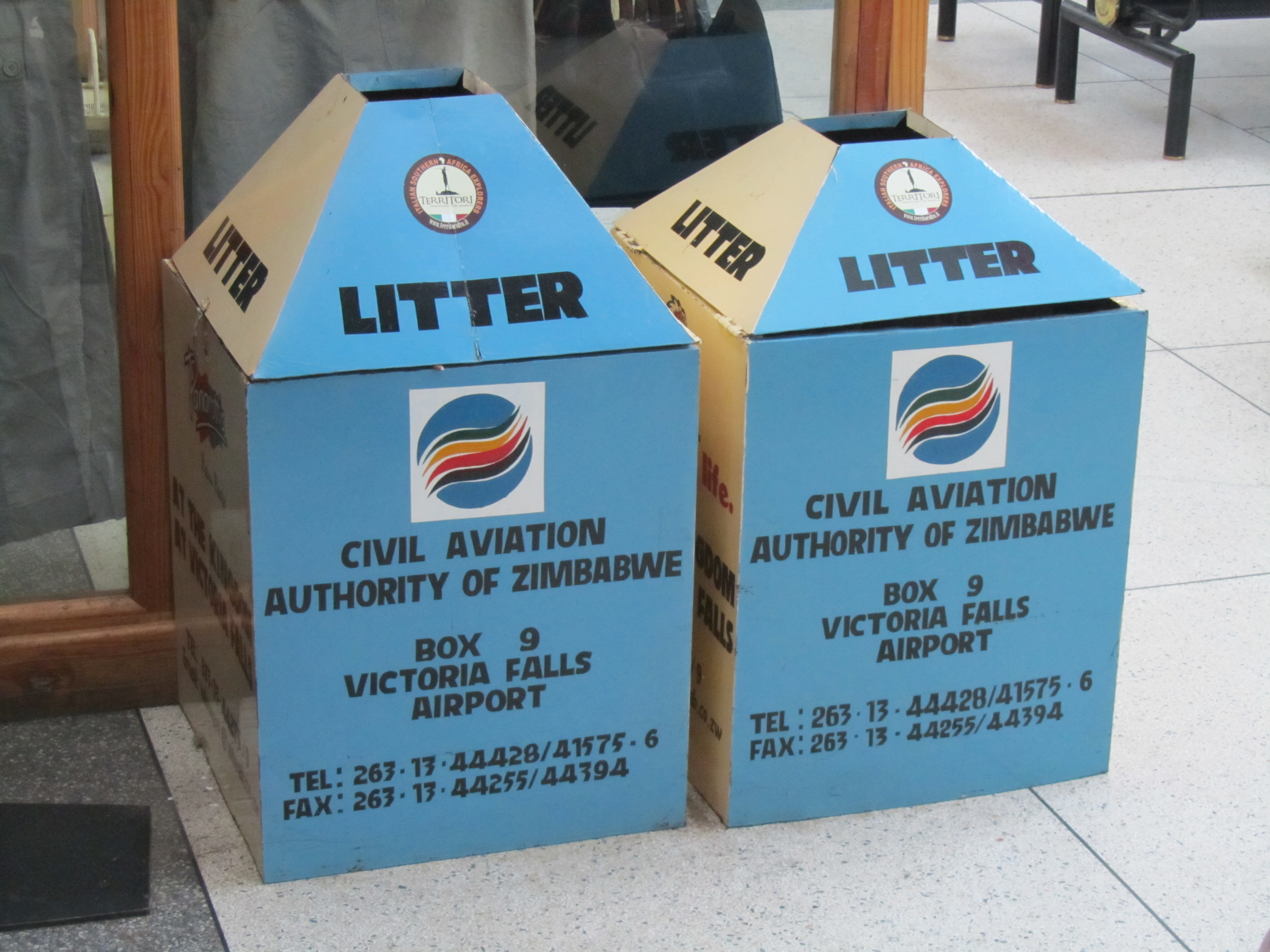
The logo of the CAAZ can be seen on these garbage cans, located at Victoria Falls Airport.

The Civil Aviation Authority of Zimbabwe (CAAZ) is the civil aviation agency of Zimbabwe, established on 1 January 1999 to replace the Department of Civil Aviation. Its head office is located on the level 3 of Harare International Airport, Harare, Zimbabwe.

== See also ==
- List of airports in Zimbabwe
- List of civil aviation authorities
