= Joshua Mqabuko Nkomo International Airport =

Airport in Bulawayo, Zimbabwe

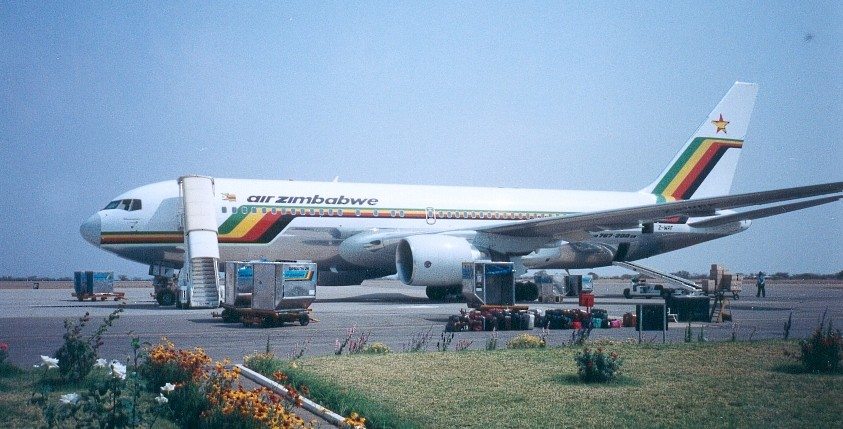
- IATA: BUQ; ICAO: FVJN

Summary
- Airport type: Public
- Owner: Airports Company of Zimbabwe
- Operator: Airports Company of Zimbabwe
- Serves: Bulawayo
- Location: Bulawayo, Zimbabwe
- Elevation AMSL: 4,359 ft / 1,308 m
- Coordinates: 20°01′2.75″S 28°37′4.33″E
- Website: acz.co.zw/airports/tour/joshua-mqabuko-nkomo-international-airport

Map

Runways
Direction	Length		Surface
Direction	m	ft	Surface
13/31	2,600	8,530	Asphalt
02/20	1,326	4,419	Asphalt

Joshua Mqabuko Nkomo International Airport (IATA: BUQ, ICAO: FVJN) is an airport serving Bulawayo, the second largest city in Zimbabwe. It is located approximately 15 kilometres (9.3 mi) north of Bulawayo city centre.

== Overview ==
Originally known as Bulawayo International Airport, it was renamed in honour of the late Dr Joshua Nkomo, the leader and founder of the Zimbabwe African People's Union in 2001. Dr Nkomo also served as a Vice President of the Zimbabwe Government. It is another of Zimbabwe's international airports. Robert Gabriel Mugabe International Airport near the capital sees similar flight traffic.

The airport operates 16 hours a day, with immigration and customs services available during operating hours. The offered airport facilities include aircraft parking, cargo and passenger handling. Additional facilities include dining, shopping, accommodation, banking, car parking, car rentals and shuttle services. The new terminal of Joshua Nkomo International Airport was opened on 1 November 2013.

== Airlines and destinations ==
Airlines	Destinations
Air Zimbabwe	Harare, Johannesburg–O. R. Tambo, Victoria Falls
Airlink	Cape Town, Johannesburg–O. R. Tambo
Ethiopian Airlines	Addis Ababa
Fastjet Zimbabwe	Harare, Johannesburg–O. R. Tambo, Victoria Falls

== Accidents and incidents ==
- 29 January 2019 - A Fastjet plane failed to land because of power failure at the airport.
