= Mutare Airport =

Airport in Zimbabwe

- IATA: UTA; ICAO: FVMU

Summary
- Airport type: Public
- Serves: Mutare, Zimbabwe
- Elevation AMSL: 3,410 ft (1,040 m)
- Coordinates: 18°59′50″S 32°37′40″E

Map
- Location of airport in Zimbabwe

Runways
Direction	Length		Surface
Direction	m	ft	Surface
12/30	950	3,117	Macadam
- Sources: WAD GCM Google Maps

Mutare Airport (IATA: UTA, ICAO: FVMU) is an airport serving Mutare, the fourth largest city in Zimbabwe and the capital of Manicaland province.

The Mutare non-directional beacon (Ident: MU) is located on a ridgeline 4.5 nautical miles (8.3 km) northeast of the field.

== See also ==
- Transport in Zimbabwe
- List of airports in Zimbabwe
