= Hwange National Park Airport =

Airport in Zimbabwe

- IATA: HWN; ICAO: FVWN

Summary
- Airport type: Public
- Serves: Hwange National Park
- Elevation AMSL: 3,543 ft (1,080 m)
- Coordinates: 18°37′45″S 27°01′15″E

Map
- Location of the airport in Zimbabwe

Runways
Direction	Length		Surface
Direction	m	ft	Surface
08/26	4,600	15,092	Asphalt
- Sources: GCM

Hwange National Park Airport (IATA: HWN, ICAO: FVWN) is an airport in Zimbabwe that once served the tourist industry around the Hwange National Park, in the northwest of the country. It is located 35 NM Southeast of Hwange Town.

The airport is used by private charter and shuttle air services. Due to economic constraints, and the economic problems of Air Zimbabwe which formerly served the airport, the airport was neglected for a number of years, and scheduled services were limited. Fastjet commenced scheduled services in April 2023 but the service ceased. No airlines use the airport.

== See also ==
- Transport in Zimbabwe
- List of airports in Zimbabwe
- List of longest runways
