= Kotwa, Zimbabwe =

Kotwa
- Location in Zimbabwe
- Coordinates: 16.984632°S 32.673139°E
- Country: Zimbabwe
- Province: Mashonaland East
- Districts of Zimbabwe: Mudzi District
  - Summer (DST): UTC+2 (CAT)
- Climate: BSh

Kotwa is a small town in Mudzi District, Mashonaland East province, Zimbabwe. It is the capital of the district, serving as its administrative and commercial centre.

== Demographics ==
Kotwa lies in the heartland of the Toko-Tonga area, generally considered to be a Shona people. As such, most of its residents are of Toko-Tonga origin. However, since Mudzi is made up of the Toko-Tonga and the Toko (Budya) people, it also has a big population of the Toko people. Other Shona peoples are also found at Kotwa, mostly being migrant government employees.

== Transport ==
Kotwa is on the Harare-Nyamapanda highway which links Zimbabwe and Malawi via Tete, Mozambique. It is 222 kilometres from Harare and is about 20 kilometres from Nyamapanda Border. It also has an aerodrome, called Kotwa Aerodrome which was mostly used by the Zimbabwe Defence Forces to launch attacks against RENAMO dissidents during the Mozambique Civil War.

== Health ==
Kotwa has one hospital, Kotwa District Hospital, which is central government owned and serves the whole of Mudzi District and one clinic owned by the Mudzi Rural District Council (local government). Being a town that is in the lowveld (it is in the Zambezi escarpment), it is very hot during summer and suffers from malaria. Like other Zimbabwe towns, it has high prevalence of HIV/AIDS.

== Economy ==
Most of Kotwa's economy is based on government services. It also serves as a market for agricultural products such as masau, vegetables, and mango fruits from the surrounding villages, mostly from the nearby Meza village. It also has a grain buying depot (under the government owned Grain Marketing Board) but these days there is not much to sale due to poor rains. In addition, Kotwa has a cotton buying depot run by Cottco.

== Education ==
Kotwa has one high school, Kotwa High School (central government owned), and two primary schools, Kotwa Primary School and Nyamakuyo Primary School (central government owned and local government owned, respectively).

== Politics ==
Kotwa lies in Mashonaland East Province and tends to vote towards Zanu (Pf). It is administered by Mudzi Rural District Council and forms part of Mudzi North constituency, currently represented by Milton Kachepa in the Parliament of Zimbabwe.
