= Transair Sweden =

Swedish airline, 1950–1981

Transair Sweeden
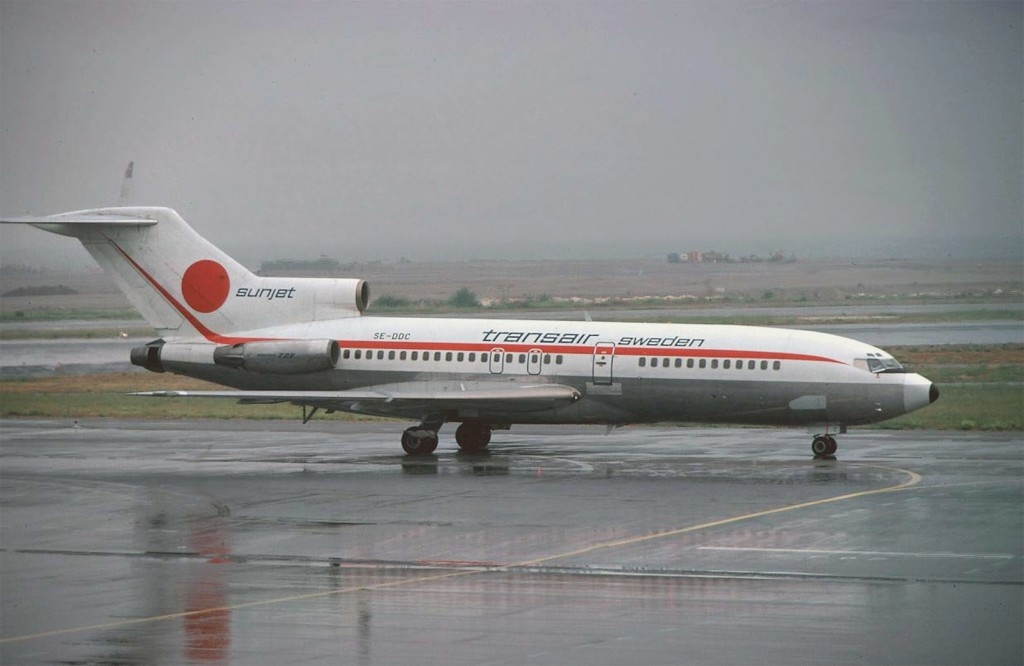
- A Boeing 727-100 of Transair Sweeden
IATA	ICAO	Call sign
NB	NBA	—
- Founded: 1950
- Ceased operations: 1981
- Subsidiaries: Transair Congo
- Headquarters: Malmö

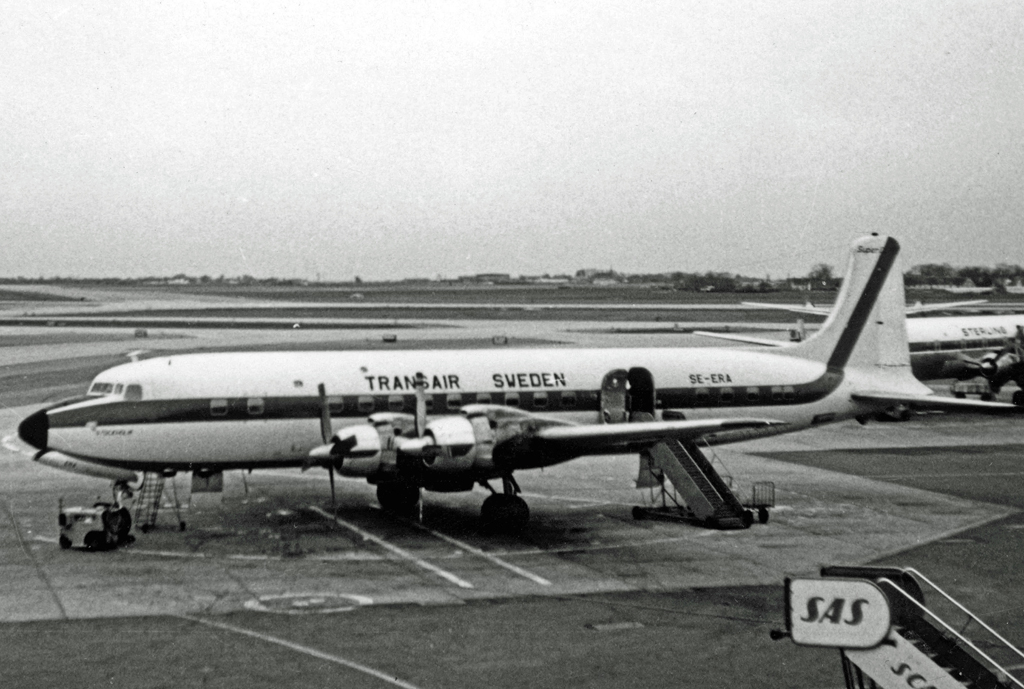
Douglas DC-7B of Transair Sweden at Copenhagen Airport in 1968

Transair Sweden AB (ICAO: TB) was a Swedish charter airline that operated until 1981.

== History ==
Transair Sweden (Note: Not to be confused with another company with similar name that operated between 2002–2003.) began as Nordisk Aerotransport AB in 1950 with the purpose of flying newspapers from Stockholm to other locations in Sweden using Airspeed Oxford aircraft.

In 1953 passenger charters began using Douglas DC-3's, and soon after the name was changed to Transair Sweden. In 1957 the Curtiss-Wright C-46 Commando cargo aircraft was introduced. Douglas DC-6's acquired from Scandinavian Airlines were introduced in 1959.

From 1965 nine Douglas DC-7B's were bought from Eastern Airlines and were added to the fleet for charter use and for flights during the civil war in Congo on behalf of the United Nations.

Freight flights on behalf of SAS were begun to cities such as Malmo, Copenhagen, Hamburg, Amsterdam, and Paris. In 1967 Boeing 727-134s were acquired but those were not kept very long. However, a year later Transair was bought by Handelsbanken and financing was introduced to acquire jet aircraft again. Shortly thereafter, SAS took a majority holding in Transair Sweden and the airline was kept flying independently under its own colors taking tourists to Spain, the Canary Islands, and other Mediterranean destinations. In 1981, the airline sold all the 727s and was integrated into SAS.

== Fleet ==
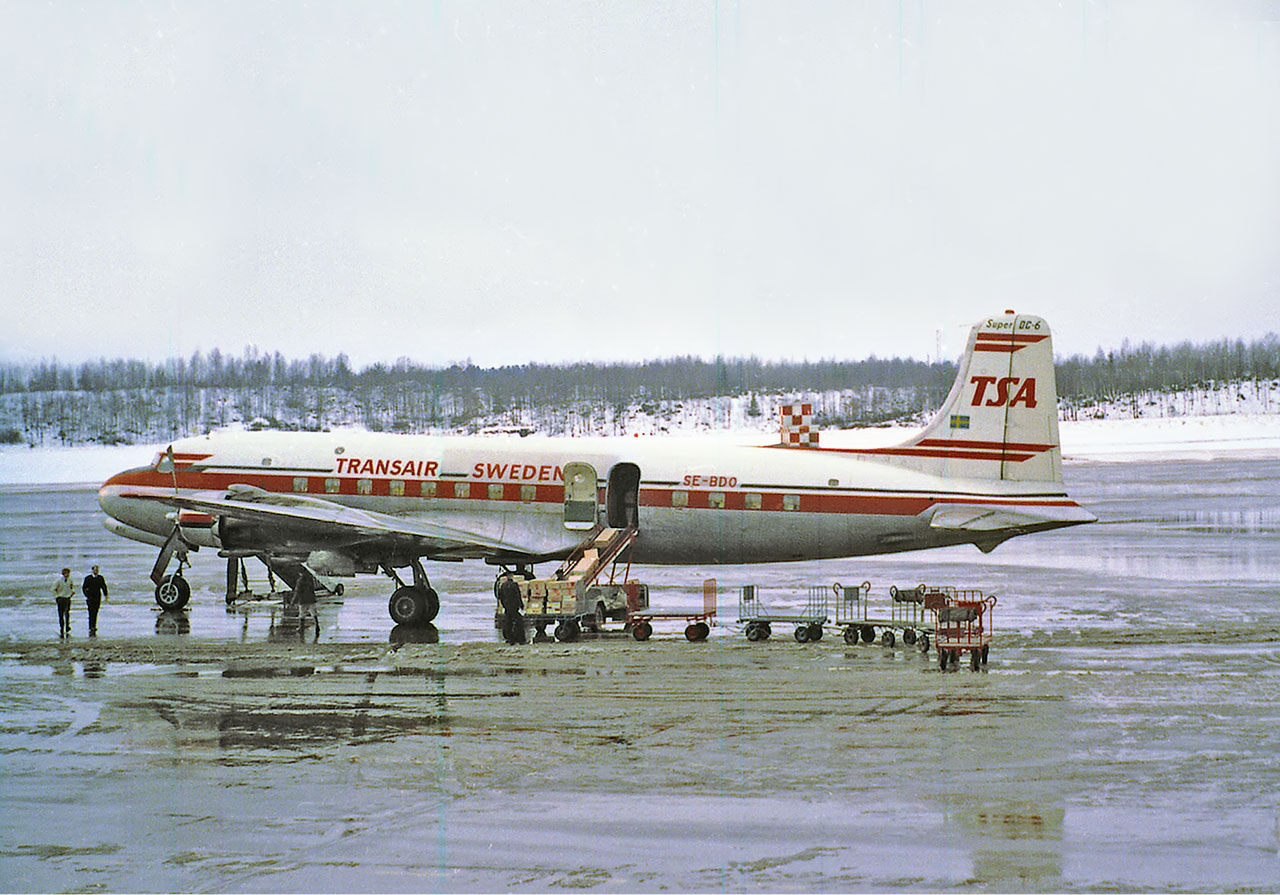
Douglas DC-6 at Stockholm Bromma Airport, 1965

- 3 - Airspeed Oxford
- 3 - Douglas DC-3
- 11 - Curtiss C-46 Commando
- 3 - Douglas DC-6
- 6 - Douglas DC-6B
- 11 - Douglas DC-7B
- 4 - Boeing 727-134 and 727-30C

== Business management ==
=== CEOs ===
- 1959-1966 - Gösta Ellhammar

=== Chairman of the Board ===
- 1958-1963 - Knut Bjuhr
- 1963-1966 - Bengt Elmgren
- 1973-1978 - Knut Hagrup

== Accidents and incidents ==
- September 18, 1961: Secretary General of the United Nations Dag Hammarskjöld and 15 other passengers and crew died when United Nations Organizations Flight 001 crashed near Ndola, Northern Rhodesia (now Zambia). The plane was owned by Transair Sweden and operated for the UN.
