= United Nations Security Council Resolution 168 =

UN Security Council Resolution 168
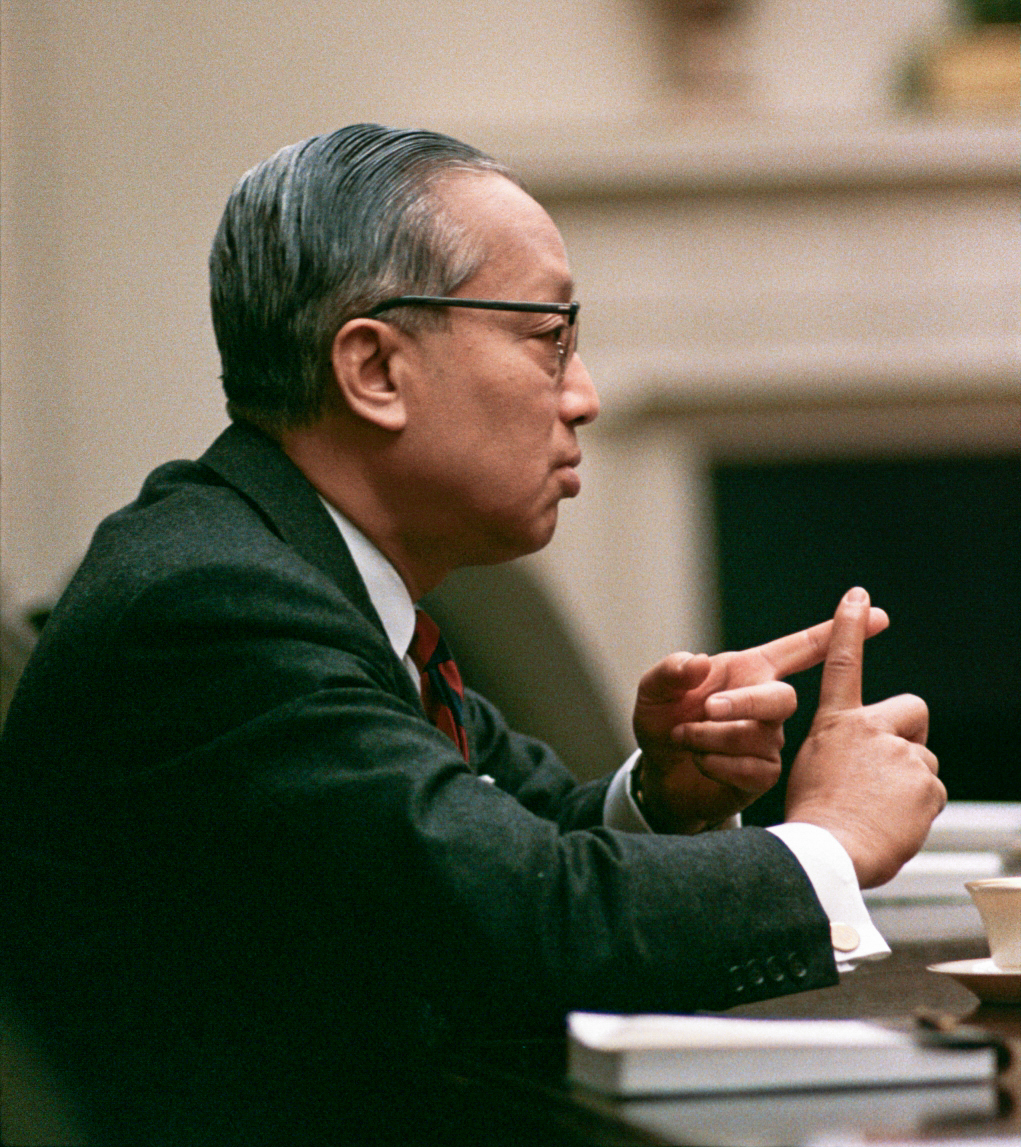
- Date: November 3 1961
- Meeting no.: 972
- Code: S/4972 (Document)
- Subject: Recommendation regarding the appointment of an acting Secretary-General
- Voting summary: 11 voted for; None voted against; None abstained
- Result: Adopted

Security Council composition
- Permanent members: China; France; Soviet Union; United Kingdom; United States
- Non-permanent members: Ceylon; Chile; Ecuador; Liberia; Turkey; United Arab Republic

United Nations Security Council Resolution 168 was adopted on November 3, 1961. After Secretary-General Dag Hammarskjöld was killed in a plane crash, the Security Council met to select his successor. The Council recommended to the General Assembly that Burmese diplomat U Thant be appointed as acting Secretary-General for the remainder of rest of Hammarskjöld's term.

The resolution was adopted unanimously by all members of the Council.

== See also ==
- List of United Nations Security Council Resolutions 101 to 200 (1953–1965)
