= Simon Mwansa Kapwepwe International Airport =

Airport serving Ndola, Zambia

Coordinates: 12°57′42″S 28°31′00″E

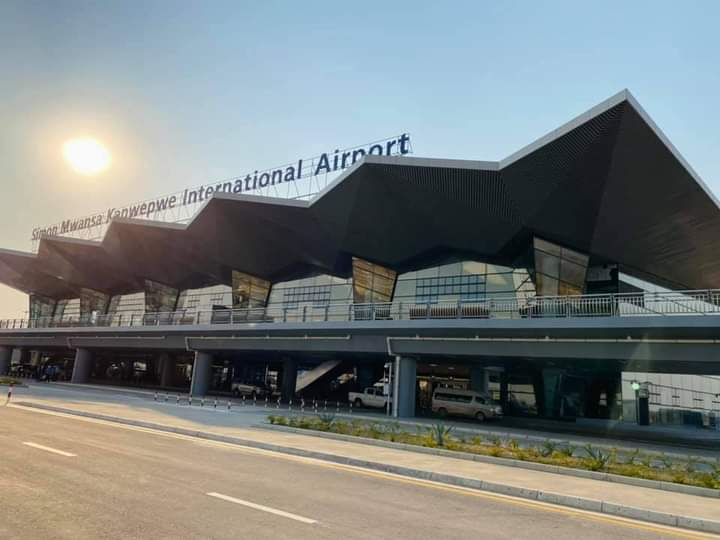
- IATA: NLA; ICAO: FLSK

Summary
- Airport type: Public
- Owner: Government of the Republic of Zambia
- Serves: Ndola and Kitwe
- Location: Ndola, Zambia
- Opened: 7 October 2021; 5 years ago
- Time zone: (UTC+2)

Map
- Location within Zambia

Runways
Direction	Length		Surface
Direction	ft	m	Surface
09/27	11,483	3,500	Asphalt

Simon Mwansa Kapwepwe International Airport (IATA: NLA, ICAO: FLSK) is an international airport in Ndola, Copperbelt Province, Zambia. It was called Ndola Airport before being renamed in 2011 for Simon Kapwepwe, the nation's former vice president. It is adjacent to the Dag Hammarskjöld Crash Site Memorial about fifteen kilometres (9.3 mi) west of the city centre.

The original Ndola Airport in Itawa (opened in the 1950s) was built to serve the city of Ndola, the administrative capital of the Copperbelt Province. Since the relocated Simon Mwansa Kapwepwe International Airport opened in 2021 it serves the cities of Kitwe and Ndola in the Copperbelt.

In late 2021 the Simon Mwansa Kapwepwe International Airport moved its operations to its present location adjacent to the Dag Hammarskjöld Memorial from its previous location in Ndola's Itawa suburb. This new airport was engineered by the Aviation Industry Corporation of China (AVIC International) at a cost of $397 million. It was expected to be completed in Mid-2020 but was delayed by setbacks due to the COVID-19 pandemic, which is why it opened the following year.

== History ==
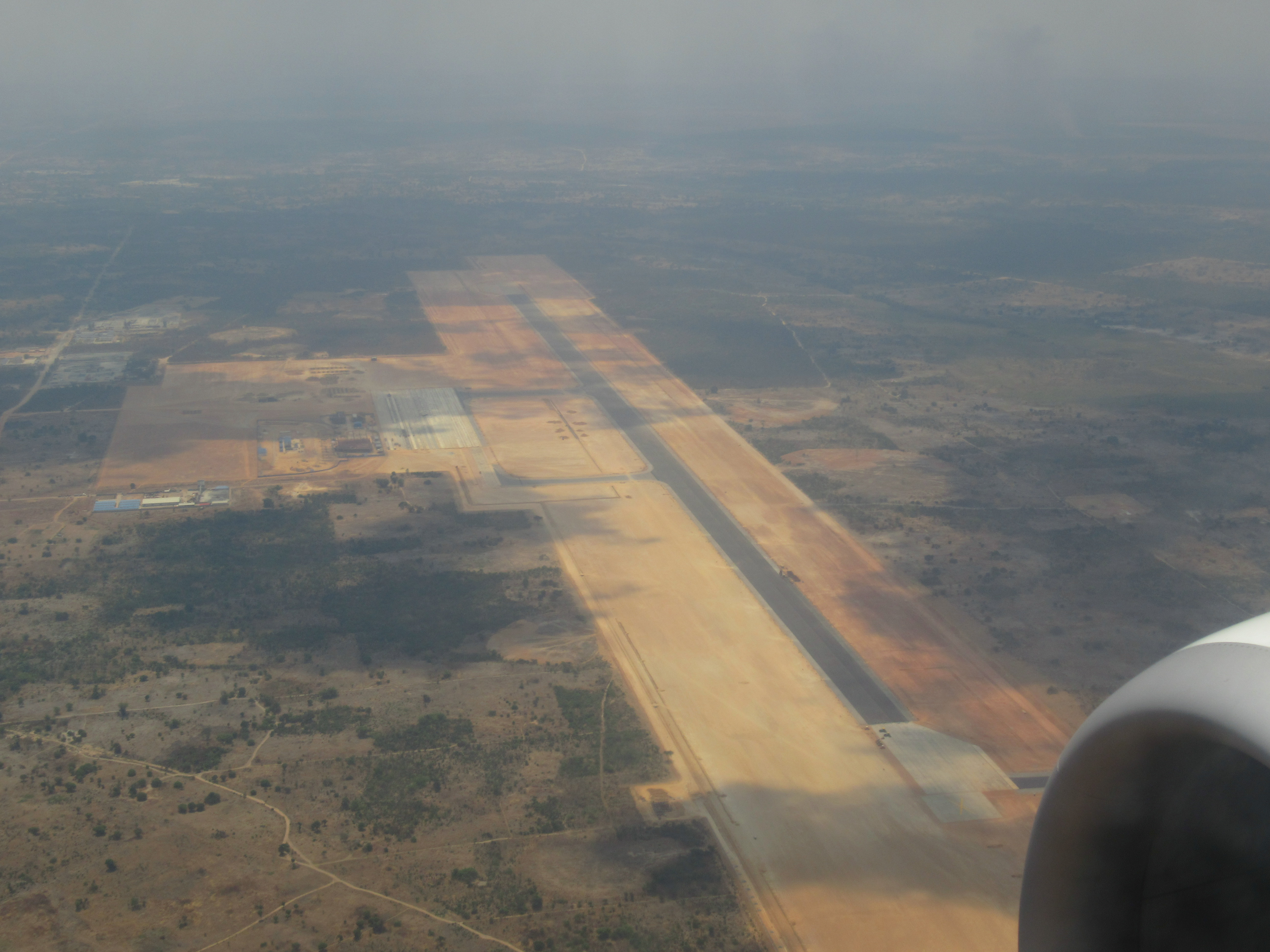
Copperbelt Airport under construction in 2018

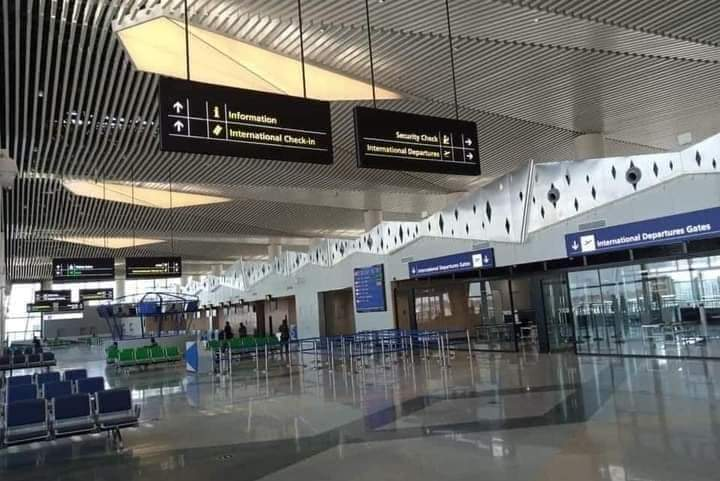
Airport interior in 2021

Before August 2021, the Simon Mwansa Kapwepwe International Airport was at an old location, in the Itawa suburb of Ndola (south-east of the city centre). Ndola's airport in Itawa officially became a civilian airport in the 1950s after first being used as a military base. Previously, it was known as Ndola Airport and in September 2011, President Michael Sata decided to rename the airport in honour of Simon Kapwepwe, the nation's former vice-president.

Initial plans indicated that the new airport would cost $522 million to build. Construction of the new airport began in 2017 and families staying at the site of the new airport were compensated.

On 5 August 2021, Ndola's airport was officially moved from Itawa to a new address, 15 kilometres west of the city centre, just north of the Dag Hammarskjöld Crash Site Memorial, which is its current address. While under construction, the airport's current location was known as the Copperbelt International Airport until construction finished in August 2021, when it was commissioned by President Edgar Lungu. At that point, it was renamed Simon Mwansa Kapwepwe International Airport, the name of the original airport. The new airport also retained the same IATA code (NLA).

The new airport was engineered by the Aviation Industry Corporation of China (AVIC International) at a cost of $397 million. It was expected to be completed in Mid-2020 but was delayed by setbacks due to the COVID-19 pandemic. On 5 August 2021, President Edgar Lungu commissioned the opening of the new airport, although it took about two more months for all operations to complete moving from the old airport to the new airport 15 kilometres west of the city centre. The airport started operations on 7 October 2021.

As such, the old airport in the Itawa suburb is no-longer a commercial airport (no-longer named SMK International) and now belongs to the Zambian Air Force. On 30 July 2021, President Edgar Lungu gave the old airport location a name, Peter Zuze Air Force Base, named after Zambia's first indigenous air commander. Ndola remains having one commercial airport.

== Facilities ==
Simon Mwansa Kapwepwe International Airport has one terminal with three jet bridges. Road access to the airport is available using the Dag Hammarskjöld Memorial access road, off the Ndola-Kitwe Dual Carriageway.

== Airlines and destinations ==
The following airlines have scheduled passenger service at Ndola International airport:

Airlines	Destinations
Airlink	Johannesburg–O. R. Tambo
Air Tanzania	Dar es Salaam
Ethiopian Airlines	Addis Ababa, Maun
Kenya Airways	Nairobi–Jomo Kenyatta
Proflight Zambia	Lusaka, Mansa, Windhoek–Hosea Kutako
Zambia Airways	Lusaka

== Accidents and incidents ==
- On 18 September 1961, a UN charter flight carrying United Nations Secretary General Dag Hammarskjöld crashed while en route to land at Ndola Airport in Itawa. Hammarskjöld and 15 others died in the crash. Although the cause of the crash has never been completely ascertained, it may have been caused by an aircraft attack. The crash site, 15 km west of the city centre (just south of the airport's current location), has been turned into the Dag Hammarskjöld Crash Site Memorial.
- On 4 April 2021, Ethiopian Airlines Flight 3981, a cargo flight operated by Boeing 737-800 ET-AYL, mistakenly landed at the as-yet unopened airport (Copperbelt International Airport) after a flight from Addis Ababa Bole International Airport. It should have landed at the nearby Simon Mwansa Kapwepwe International Airport in Itawa instead. The aircraft then took off from Copperbelt International and flew to the correct airport (Simon Mwansa Kapwepwe International). Two and a half hours later, a second Ethiopian Airlines aircraft, Boeing 737-800 ET-AQP, also approached the as-yet unopened airport for a landing, but aborted in time and flew to the correct airport. It was reported that markings indicating the runway is closed were indistinct. Zambia's Transport Ministry opened an investigation into the incident.

== See also ==
- Peter Zuze Air Force Base
- Transport in Zambia
- List of airports in Zambia
