= 1961 United Nations Secretary-General selection =

Selection of U Thant

- 3 November 1961
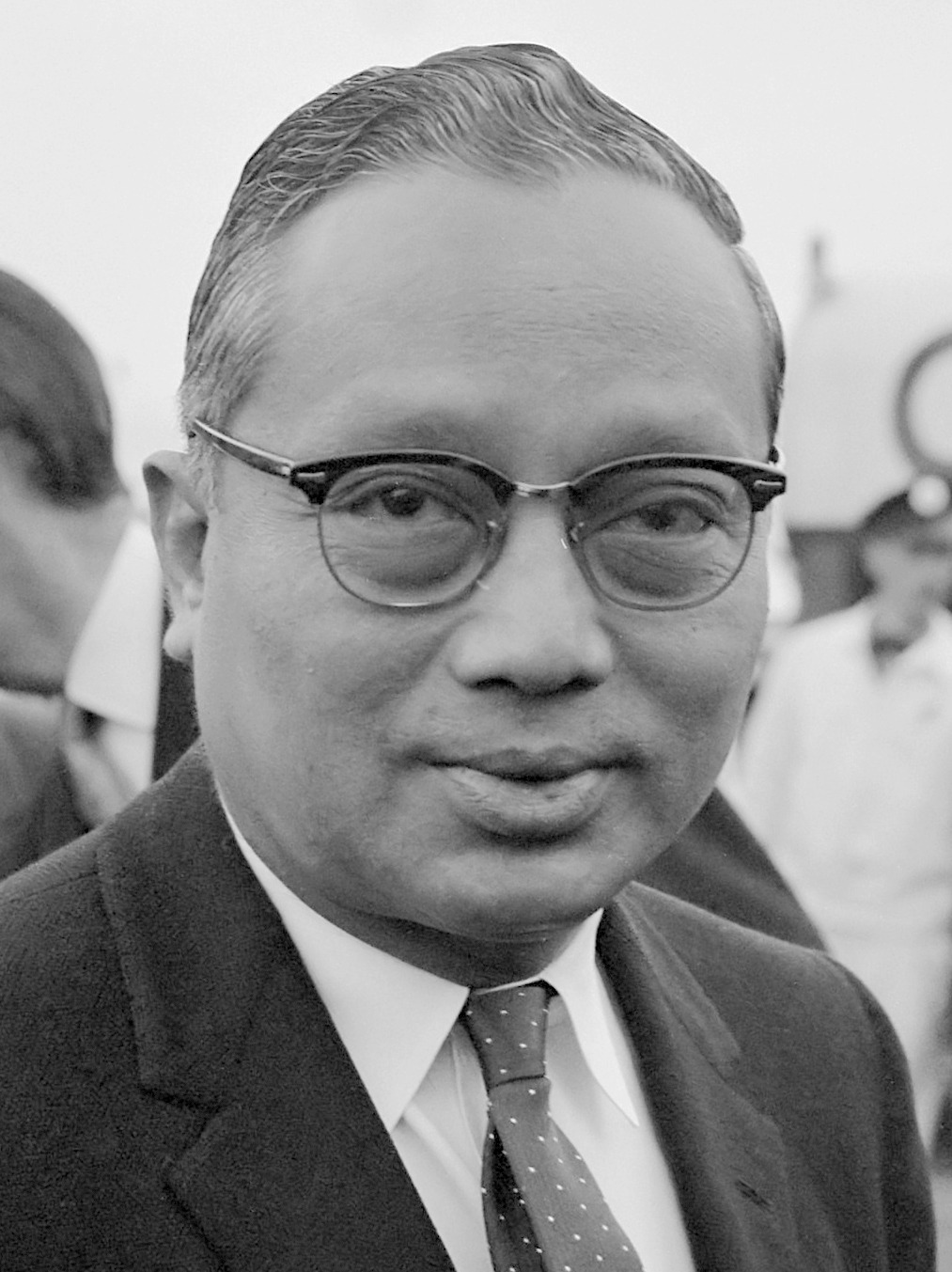
Candidate	U Thant
Country	Burma
Vote	11 / 11
Vetoes	None
UN Secretary-General before election
Dag Hammarskjöld
Elected UN Secretary-General
U Thant

A United Nations Secretary-General selection was held in 1961 to replace Dag Hammarskjöld after he was killed in a plane crash. After initial Soviet attempts to replace the secretary-general with a troika, it was agreed that an acting secretary-general would be appointed for the remainder of Hammarskjöld's term. Within two weeks, U Thant of Burma emerged as the only candidate who was acceptable to both the Soviet Union and the United States. However, the superpowers spent another four weeks arguing over the number of assistant secretaries-general, before finally resolving their dispute by allowing Thant to decide for himself. Thant was then voted in unanimously for a term ending on 10 April 1963.

Thant's term was extended in 1962 to a full five years, and he was drafted for a second term in 1966 ending on 31 December 1971. Thant served a total of 10 years and 2 months in office, making him the longest-serving secretary-general in history. Future candidates would be subject to a two-term limit, with each term running for exactly 5 years.

== Background ==
Secretary-General Dag Hammarskjöld had been actively engaged in the Congo Crisis, flying frequently to the war zone to supervise the U.N. peacekeeping mission. On 18 September 1961, Hammarskjöld flew to Ndola in Northern Rhodesia to meet with rebel leader Moïse Tshombe of the State of Katanga. After circling the airfield twice, the airplane crashed, killing Hammarskjöld and all but one of the other occupants. The airplane crash set off a succession crisis at the United Nations, as Hammarskjöld's death required the Security Council to vote on a successor.

== Succession crisis ==
The Soviet Union had been pushing to replace the secretary-general with a troika, the three men to be named by each of the Three Worlds of the Cold War. The Soviets recommended that three of the thirteen under secretaries-general be promoted to the troika: Georgi P. Arkadev of the Soviet Union, Ralph Bunche of the United States, and Chakravarthi V. Narasimhan of India. However, U.S. President John F. Kennedy objected that a troika had three horses but only one driver. U.S. Secretary of State Dean Rusk admitted on 22 September 1961 that "an immediate agreement cannot be expected" and suggested filling the secretary-generalship on a temporary basis.

The question of finding a replacement for Hammarskjöld raised several constitutional questions, as the U.N. Charter made no provision for succession to the office of secretary-general. The United States and the United Kingdom argued that the General Assembly could act on its own to provide for the rest of Hammarskjöld's term. Several European countries suggested that the officeholder could not hold the title of acting secretary-general, as the selection of anyone called "secretary-general" would require action by the Security Council. The Soviet Union, India, Ireland, and the Scandinavian countries argued that the Security Council must act to select a replacement for Hammarskjöld.

== Candidates ==
Official candidates
Image	Candidate	Position	Regional group
	(Tunisia) Mongi Slim	President of the United Nations General Assembly	Asian Group
	(Myanmar) U Thant	Chairman of the UN Congo Commission	Asian Group

== Negotiations ==
The developing world insisted on a secretary-general from a non-European nation, and Hammarskjöld himself had stated that his successor should be from Asia or Africa.

Mongi Slim of Tunisia was elected President of the General Assembly on 21 September 1961. The United States came up with a plan for Slim to carry out the duties of secretary-general, while he would delegate his own duties to one of the Vice-Presidents of the General Assembly. However, Slim insisted that the General Assembly would not act until the candidates had first been submitted to the Security Council. Nathan Barnes of Liberia, as President of the Security Council, attempted to arrange for Great Power consultations on the topic. However, the Soviet Union refused to attend any meeting that included Ambassador Tsiang Tingfu of Nationalist China, on the grounds that the Chinese seat at the United Nations actually belonged to Communist China.

After the rejection of Great Power consultations, the two superpowers negotiated bilaterally on the secretary-generalship. Soviet ambassador Valerian Zorin met with U.S. ambassador Adlai Stevenson II on 29 September 1961, and the superpowers moved closer to agreement over the next week. The Soviet Union agreed to select a single acting secretary-general, and the United States dropped Mongi Slim in favor of U Thant. The Arab countries were also willing to accept Thant, even though Burma had diplomatic relations with Israel. The principal opposition to Thant came from Western Europe, Latin America, and the French-speaking countries of Africa.

=== Terms of office ===
Although the superpowers had quickly agreed on Hammarskjöld's successor, they deadlocked on the details of the appointment. The Soviet Union wanted to name an acting secretary-general, who must first declare that he would take actions "in agreement" with the under secretaries-general. The United States maintained that the Security Council must appoint a permanent secretary-general, and only the General Assembly could name an interim secretary-general. The United States also insisted that the secretary-general must have freedom of action.

The main point of disagreement was over the number of under secretaries-general. The Soviet Union originally insisted on three Assistants with provision for compulsory consultation, while the United States wanted five Assistants with optional consultation. The Soviet Union then proposed four Assistants, one each from the United States, the Soviet Union, Africa, and Latin America. The United States again demanded five Assistants, including one from Western Europe, whereupon the Soviet Union countered with six or seven, including one from Eastern Europe. British ambassador Patrick Dean received instructions from London to accept seven and reject four, and he convinced U.S. ambassador Stevenson to accept seven "as a last resort." However, the U.S. State Department issued instructions that five was the only acceptable number.

The deadlock was finally broken on 1 November 1961 when Stevenson suggested that Thant be allowed to decide for himself how many Assistants he would have. Thant also prepared a declaration that did not commit in advance to naming five or seven Under-Secretaries.

== Vote ==
The Security Council met in closed session on 3 November 1961, unanimously adopting Resolution 168 to recommend U Thant to the General Assembly. A resolution was presented that afternoon by Ceylon, Liberia, and the United Arab Republic, all of them non-permanent members of the Security Council. The United States and the Soviet Union could not sponsor the resolution, as the other permanent members would have joined as co-sponsors, and the Soviet Union did not accept the participation of Nationalist China.

The General Assembly voted that afternoon by secret ballot to accept the Security Council's recommendation. In a unanimous vote of 103-0-0, the General Assembly appointed U Thant as acting secretary-general of the United Nations for a term ending on 10 April 1963.

== 1962 selection ==
U.S. Ambassador Adlai Stevenson announced in May 1962 that he would vote for Thant's re-election. Thant subsequently played a major role in resolving the Cuban Missile Crisis in October 1962. A second term was assured when Soviet Premier Nikita Khrushchev made several favorable references to Thant in letters to U.S. President John F. Kennedy. However, some of the other members of the Security Council were annoyed that the Soviet Union and the United States had decided on a second term without consulting the other Council members.

On 30 November 1962, the Security Council met in secret session and adopted a communiqué recommending that Thant be appointed to a term ending 3 November 1966. Soviet Ambassador Valerian Zorin reiterated that a troika was "the only one [arrangement] consonant with reality." Nevertheless, the Soviet Union would vote for Thant in recognition of his "positive action" during the "dangerous crisis in the Caribbean." For personal reasons, Thant wished to have his second term extend five years from his own selection, rather than five years from the expiration of Hammarskjöld's term as the United States had wanted. No formal resolution was adopted by the Security Council, and Thant would henceforth consider his first five years in office to be a single term.

The General Assembly followed with a vote of 109-0-0 with one absence. Thant was promoted from acting secretary-general to secretary-general, and his term in office was extended until 3 November 1966.

== 1966 selection ==
In 1966, Thant was assured of running unopposed with the support of both superpowers. The only question was whether he would accept a full five-year term. The prospect of a smooth re-selection was clouded on 1 September 1966, when Thant released a statement saying, "I have decided not to offer myself for a second term as Secretary General." Thant offered to stay on until the end of the General Assembly session on 2 December 1966 while a successor was selected.

However, no other candidates were nominated to succeed Thant, and it was expected that he would accept a draft. On 23 November 1966, Thant explained to U.S. Ambassador Arthur Goldberg that he could only reverse his decision if the Council gave him something to save "face". The face-saving statement came on 1 December 1966, when Thant met with the President of the Security Council and all of the permanent members except for Nationalist China. They promised him wider latitude to initiate action, assuring him that he would not be a "glorified clerk."

On 2 December 1966, the Security Council unanimously adopted Resolution 229 to recommend Thant for another term. The General Assembly voted 120-0-1 to re-appoint Thant as Secretary-General of the United Nations for a term ending on 31 December 1971. To date, this remains the last time that the Republic of China has partaken in the appointment of the Secretary-General.

== 1971 selection ==
On 18 January 1971, Thant announced that he had "no intention whatsoever" to serve another term. Unlike the 1966 selection, several candidates entered the race after Thant's declaration, beginning with Max Jakobson of Finland on 20 January 1971. However, the prospect of another draft loomed over the race, especially from the Soviet Union, France, and the Third World countries. Thant declared in September 1971 that his decision was "final and categorical," and he would not serve "even for two months" past the end of his term. Thant's health also took a turn for the worse, as he was treated at Leroy Hospital for a bleeding ulcer in November 1971.

Nevertheless, the Soviet Union attempted to draft Thant at the first consultation of the permanent members on 6 December 1971. Soviet Ambassador Yakov Malik brushed aside concerns about Thant's health, saying that he should be given two weeks of vacation. The United States and the United Kingdom argued that Thant should be allowed to retire, and U.S. Secretary of State William P. Rogers instructed Ambassador George H. W. Bush to veto Thant if necessary.

Thant's name did not appear on the ballot in 1971, and he stepped down when his last term in office ran out on 31 December 1971. Concerns about his health proved well-founded, as Thant died of cancer on 25 November 1974.
