= Robbyanto Budiman =

- Born: 14 January 1967
- Died: 10 February 2023 (aged 56)
- Education: University of Southern California; Northrop University
- Occupation: Businessman
- Known for: CEO, PT Wahanaartha Harsaka Tbk
- Children: 3 daughters

Robbyanto Budiman (14 January 1967 – 10 February 2023) was an Indonesian businessman, and the CEO of PT Wahanaartha Harsaka Tbk, the holding company of Wahana Artha Group. The group's core business is PT Wahana Makmur Sejati, the main dealer for Honda motorcycles in Jakarta and Tangerang since 1972. He is a director of its subsidiary companies.

== Early life ==
Budiman earned a bachelor's degree from the University of Southern California and an MBA from Northrop University.

== Career ==
After his college graduation, from 1989 to 1992, Budiman worked for Citibank, rising to asset services unit head.

Budiman was CEO of Wahanaartha Harsaka, Indonesia's leading integrated motorcycle services group, since 1997.

== Personal life ==
Budiman was married, with three daughters.

In 2013, Budiman bought a house in Beverly Hills, California, for US$4.2 million, close to where his sister lives.

He died on 10 February 2023.
