= Northrop University =

Technology university in Inglewood, California (1946–1991)

- Seal of Northrop University
- Former names: Northrop Aeronautical Institute (1942 to March 1959); Northrop Institute of Technology (March 1959 to 1974)
- Type: Private
- Active: November 1945–1991
- Founder: Jack Northrop
- Parent institution: Northrop Aircraft
- Accreditation: Western Association of Schools and Colleges
- Officer in charge: James L. McKinley, director (1946)
- President: B.J. Shell (1972-1989); John Beljan (1989-1991)
- Location: 1108 West Arbor Vitae Street, Inglewood, California, 90306, United States
- Campus: 18 acres (7.3 ha)

Northrop University, formerly Northrop Institute of Technology and Northrop Aeronautical Institute, was a private for-profit college in Inglewood, California, focused on aviation, engineering, science, mathematics, and computing. It was established in the 1940s as one of the earliest examples of a corporate university. It operated from 1946 to 1991.

== History ==
Toward the end of 1940, Northrop Aircraft Corporation started a training program for airplane mechanics who would, then, work in its manufacturing facility in Hawthorne, California. In 1942, Northrop Aircraft started a program called Department 95 that provided technical training exclusively for military personnel during World War II. It was overseen by Jack Northrop and James L. McKinley.

After the war, John Northrop formed the Northrop Aeronautical Institute because he recognized the shortage of master mechanics, airline maintenance specialists, and aeronautical engineers for civilian aviation. Classes started through home study in January 1946 and expanded to on-site in June 1946. The school targeted male students, mostly veterans of the war, as well as employees of Northrop Aircraft. The first semester has 412 students, with 750 students by the end of the academic year. The school admitted 1,000 students in its second year.

Its first director was James L. McKinley. Charles Edward Chapel became its research and development director in 1946. Its 80 faculty included employees of Nortrup Corporation and, eventually, alumni of the school.

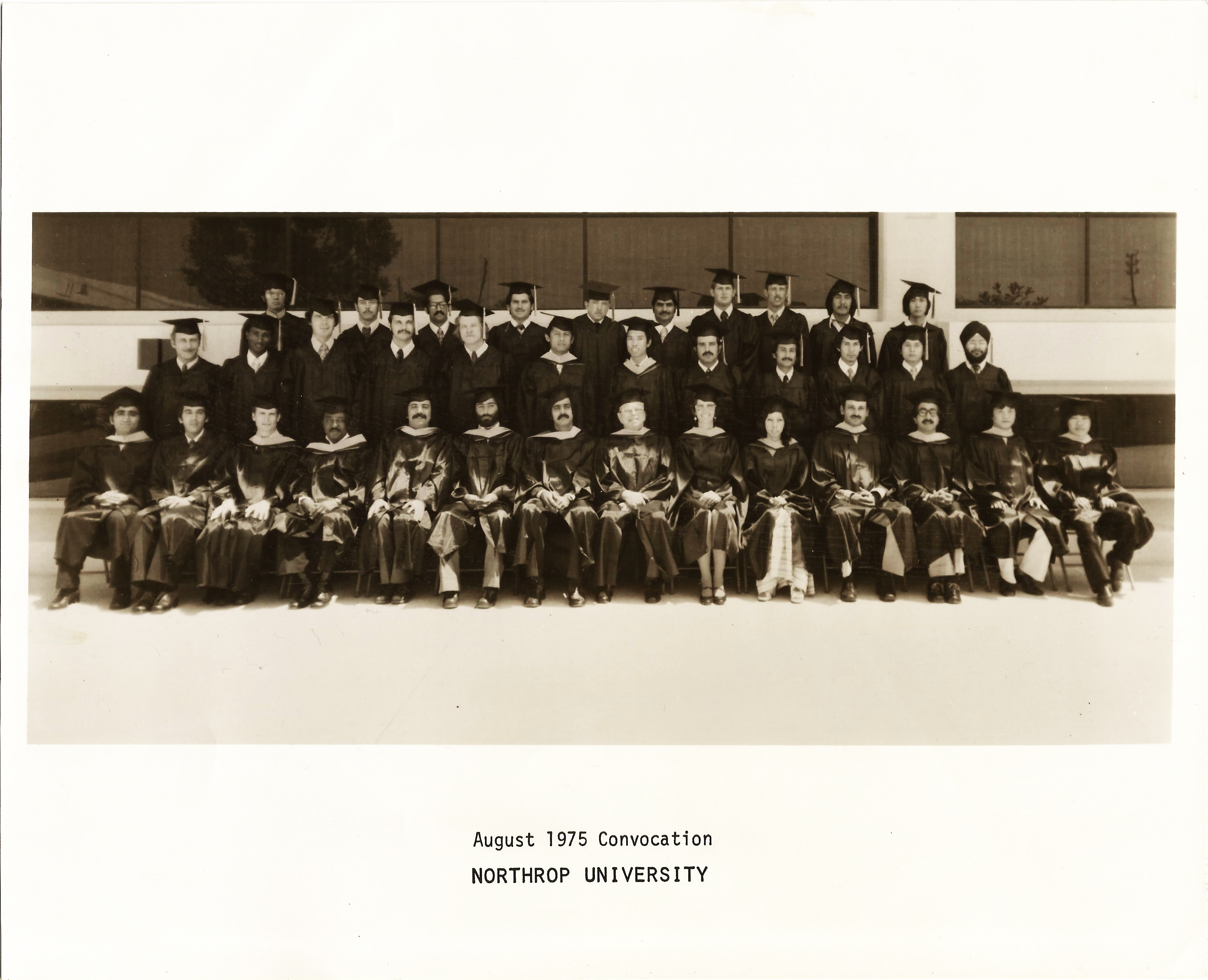
August 1975 Convocation Northrop University

In May 1953, Northrop Aircraft decided to sell the school so it could focus on producing airplanes. The Northrop Aeronautical Institute merged with California Flyers, a school in Inglewood, and became an independent, for-profit college. In March 1959, the school announced its new name, Northrop Institute of Technology, and the start of its bachelor of science curriculum.

It became Northrop University in 1974 and offered master's degrees. The university's mission statement was "to expand human knowledge and benefit society through research integrated with education. We investigate the most challenging, fundamental problems in science and technology in a singularly collegial, interdisciplinary atmosphere while educating outstanding students to become creative members of society." By 1977, the university had nearly 14,000 graduates in its aviation program.

In 1989, the Western Association of Schools and Colleges accused the university of improprieties in bookkeeping, credits, and the recruitment of foreign students. This threatened the school's accreditation with that agency. B.J. Shell who had been the university's president for seventeen years, stepped down. John Beljan, previously the provost of California State University, became interim president. Despite Beljan's successful rescue of the school's accreditation, student enrollment dropped from 1,800 to 928 in 1991.

In 1990, James and Alice Rice purchased Northrop University and merged it with Rice Aviation, establishing Northrop Rice USA. In May 1991, Northrop University announced that it was ending its degree programs and cutting the related staff due to low enrollment and financial problems. Students in its degree-based programs were assisted in transferring to other institutions after the June 1991 semester. At this time, the Inglewood campus was closed.

Northrop Rice USA established the Northrop Rice Aviation Institute of Technology which offered training in avionics, helicopter maintenance, and technical training. Starting in 1998, Northrop Rice Aviation Institute was sold several times, passing from Redstone College to Crimson College and to Spartan College of Aeronautics and Technology. As of 2023, the latter operates the Northrop Rice Aviation Institute of Technology as an online aviation maintenance training program. On September 12, 2022, it started offering advanced training in person at Ellington Field in Houston, Texas.

== Campus ==
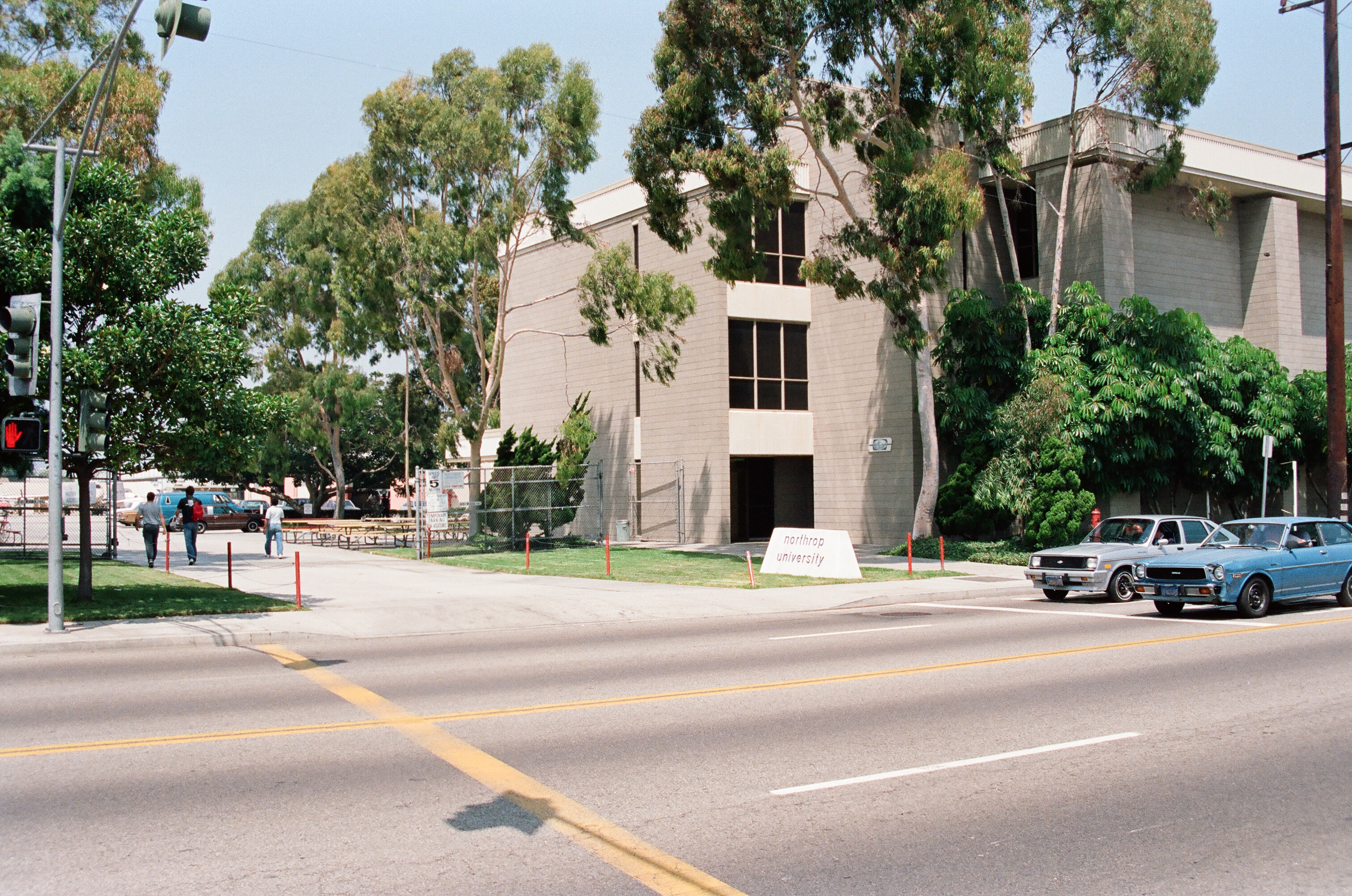
Northrop University Campus Arbor Vitae St. Sep. 1986

Northrop Aeronautical Institute was originally located in the Northrop Aircraft plant at 1637 East Broadway at Northrop Field in Hawthorne, Los Angeles County, California. It consisted of three purpose-built structures: a main building that included administration, classrooms, and engineering drafting rooms; a building for laboratories; and a building with modern shops/ In January 1946, Northrop purchased a former Army barracks that had been temporarily installed on property owned by the City of Los Angeles and relocated it to property adjacent to Northrop Aircraft to use as dormitories for 150 to 170 students.

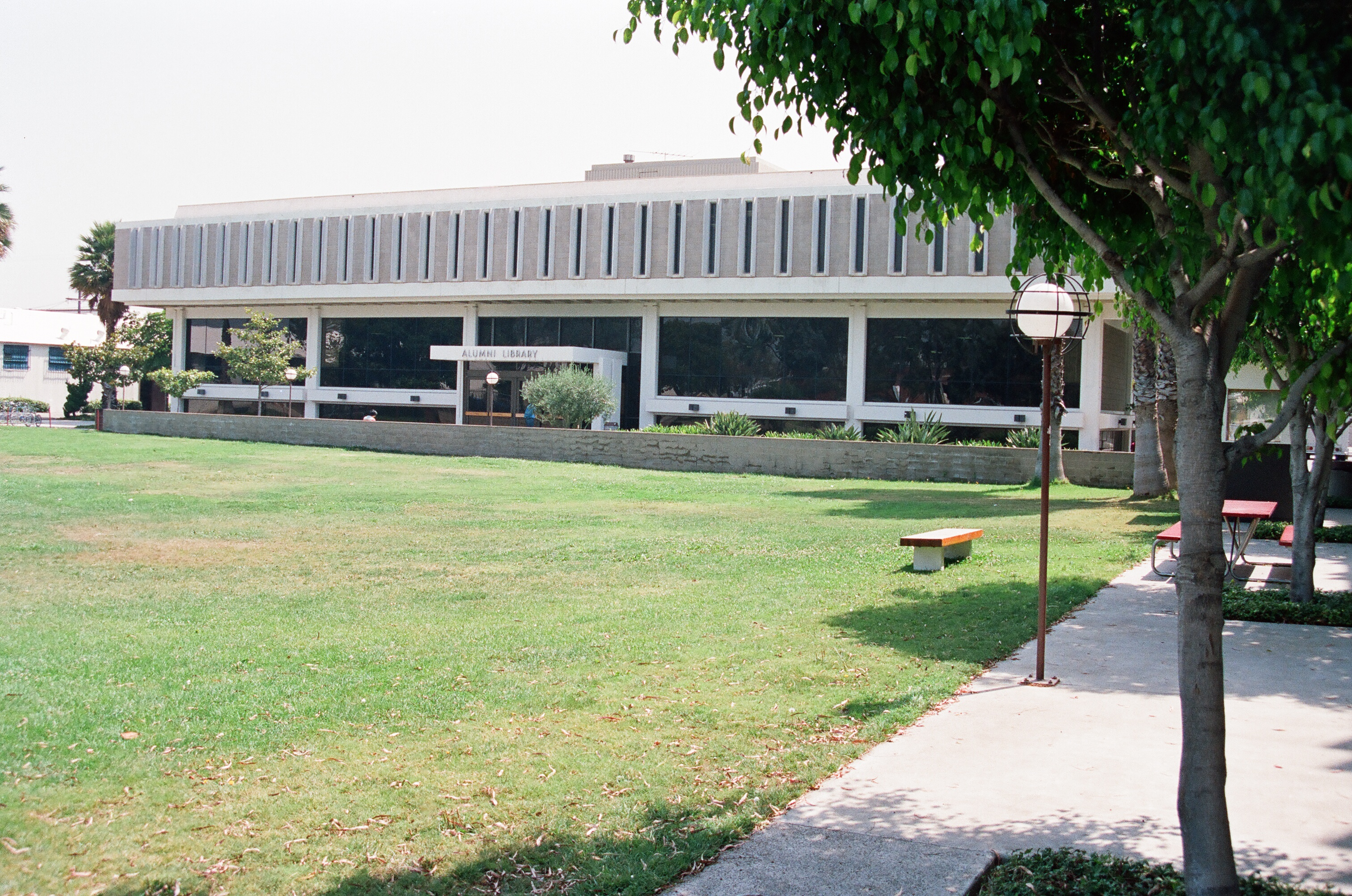
Northrop University Alumni Library Sep 1986

After it was sold and merged, the school moved to 5800 West Arbor Vitae Street in Inglewood, California near the Los Angeles airport in 1953. Its School of Law was located at 1108 West Arbor Vitae Street in Los Angeles, California. By 1977, the campus consisted of eighteen acres.

The Central Coast Institute of Technology was founded in Santa Barbara in 1978 and was accredited as a satellite campus of Northrop University in 1979.

== Academics ==
=== Curriculum ===
When it opened, Northrop Aeronautical Institute specialized in aeronautical engineering and training for airline maintenance mechanics. It offered a two-year aeronautical engineering technician associate's degree, an A & E master airplane and engineer mechanic program, and fifty-week certificate programs for engine mechanics, airline maintenance specialists, and airplane and engine maintenance workers. A 1946 ad, claimed, "The Northrop Aeronautical Institute brings to aviation training completely new standards."

In March 1959, the school's program expanded to include a bachelor of science degree in aeronautical engineering, reflecting the industry's need for space engineers. In 1975, it offered bachelor's and master's degrees in accounting, aeronautical sciences, business administration and management, computer science, electrical engineering, design engineering project management, and mechanical engineering. It also added business and law schools. The Law School published the Northrop University Law Journal of Aerospace, Energy and the Environment and the Northrop University Law Journal of Aerospace, Business, and Taxation. The latter started in 1979 and was published annually.

Starting in 1978, it offered bachelor's and master's degrees in aeronautical sciences, computer science, electrical, mechanical, and systems engineering programs at its satellite campus at Central Coast Institute of Technology. In 1991, the university issued 309 master's degrees and 189 baccalaureate degrees.

=== Admissions ===
In the fall of 1991, the freshman class included students from 29 states and 53 countries; 25 percent were from California. The freshmen had a mean SAT score of 500 verbal and 500 math. Sixty percent of applicants were accepted. Total students that year included 755 full-time and 173 part-time.

=== Accreditation and honors ===
The university was accredited by the Western Association of Schools and Colleges in 1960.

=== Library and museum ===
In 1991, the university's library consisted of 66,135 books, 75,871 government documents, 100,000 microforms, and 980 audiovisual materials. The library subscribed to 400 periodicals. The campus also included a Law Library.

In 1975, Jack Northrop made a significant donation to create the American Hall of Aviation, a museum that became part of the library's collection. The museum included the David D. Hatfield Collection of Aviation History which was the largest collection of aviation history ever to be displayed at a single location, including more than 500,000 objects.

== Student life ==
=== Housing ===
In 1991, fifteen percent of students lived on campus in dormitories.

=== Organizations and activities ===
Northrop University was home to three social fraternities. Alpha Epsilon Rho was a local fraternity established in 1963. In 1968, Alpha Epsilon Rho became a chapter of the national fraternity Tau Kappa Epsilon that was active at the university through 1993. in addition, the national fraternity Sigma Phi Epsilon was active there from 1972 to 1976.

The university also had a chapter of Alpha Eta Rho, a professional college aviation fraternity, that was chartered in March 1960. Its chapter of the engineering honor society Tau Beta Pi was chartered in 1974.

Army, Navy, and Air Force ROTC were offered through UCLA Extension the University of Southern California, and Loyola Marymount University, respectively.

Student publications included LOG, a weekly newspaper.

=== Sports ===
Students at Northrop University formed a Sepak takraw or kick volleyball in 1986. Malaysia Airlines sponsored the team to represent the United States at the national tournament in Kuala Lumpur, Malaysia in November 1987; the Northrop team came in first place.

== Popular culture ==
- Northrop University loaned its GE turbojet engine for the jet car sequences in the film The Adventures of Buckaroo Banzai Across the 8th Dimension (1984).
- The first accounts of organized Sepak takraw in the United States were at Northrop University where Malaysian students formed a team in 1986.

== Notable alumni ==
- Forrest Bird (ScD), aviator, inventor, and biomedical engineer
- Tim Brummer, winner of the Abbott Prize and co-founder of Lightning Cycle Dynamics while still a student at Northrop
- Robbyanto Budiman (MBA), Indonesian businessman
- Bob Citron (Aerospace engineering, 1959), entrepreneur and aerospace engineer
- Chris Dreike, co-founder of Lightning Cycle Dynamics while still a student at Northrop
- Chu Fong-chi, Taiwanese politician who served in the Legislative Yuan
- Don Guichard, co-founder of Lightning Cycle Dynamics while still a student at Northrop
- Ed Horstman (BS Aeronautical Engineering), naval architect and multihull sailboat designer
- Ray Jardine (Aerospace Engineering, 1963) rock climber who the first to free climb the West Face of El Capitan in Yosemite Valley
- Lin Ling‑san (MS), Minister of Transportation and Communications of the Republic of China
- Anthony S. Manera (BS Electronics Engineering, 1963), President of the Canadian Broadcasting Corporation
- Carolyn L. Mazloomi, curator, quilter, author, art historian, and aerospace engineer
- Francis M. McDaniel Jr., South Dakota House of Representatives
- Emil Notti (BS degree in aeronautical and electrical engineering), 1st President of the Alaska Federation of Natives
- Gordon Novel, private investigator and electronics expert
- Naveed Qamar (1974, MS Management), member National Assembly of Pakistan, Pakistan Minister for Defence and Pakistan Minister for Finance
- Jack Real (Honorary 1985), aerospace pioneer
- Shawn Steel (J.D.) , Republican National Committeeman from California and former chairman of the California Republican Party
- Suphajee Suthumpun (master's degree in business administration), CEO of the hotel business Dusit International and Deputy Prime Minister of Thailand
- Ray Swanson, painter of the American West
- Jim Thelle, ERAU Asst. Professor, Airline Engineering Management, Entrepreneur
- Gerald Wiegert, automotive engineer and founder of Vector Motors
- Muhammad Mian Soomro, Ex-Prime Minister of Pakistan

== Notable faculty ==
- Amanie Abdelmessih, mechanical engineer
- Charles Edward Chapel, politician and noted technical writer
- Knut Hagrup, Norwegian aviator
- John Northrop, aircraft industrialist and designer who founded the Northrop Corporation
