= Central Coast Institute of Technology =

The Central Coast Institute of Technology was founded in 1978. The school opened for classes in September 1978 to 321 students committed to and/or already employed by the defense industry.

Known as Central Coast Tech by alumni, the campus was located in Santa Barbara, California, and offered bachelors and master's degree programs in aeronautical sciences, computer science, electrical, mechanical, and systems engineering programs.

Central Coast Tech was accredited as a satellite campus of Northrop University by the Western Association of Schools and Colleges (WASC). WASC is one of the nationally recognized accrediting bodies in the U.S. The Central Coast Institute of Technology received accredited standard in 1979 and the final month and year of being accredited was February, 1999.

In August 1998, Central Coast Tech closed its doors to the public. Mismanaged funds and decreased attendance and donations crippled the school. The Institute's doors remain closed today.
