= John Clayden =

Sir Henry John Clayden (26 April 1904 – 11 July 1986) was a Transvaal Colony-born judge who served as Chief Justice of the Federation of Rhodesia and Nyasaland from 1960 to 1964. He chaired the Rhodesian Commission of Inquiry into the 1961 Ndola United Nations DC-6 crash, which killed Dag Hammarskjöld, the Secretary-General of the United Nations.

== Biography ==
Born in Maraisburg, Transvaal, Clayden was the son of H. W. Clayden, an engineer. He was educated at Diocesan College, Cape Town, Charterhouse School, and Brasenose College, Oxford. He joined the Inner Temple in 1925 and read in chambers with D. B. Somervell, KC (later the law lord Lord Somervell of Harrow). He was called to the English Bar at the Inner Temple in 1926 and called as an advocate to the South African Bar in 1927.

Clayden practiced in Johannesburg until the Second World War. He was commissioned into the South African Engineer Corps in 1940 and served with the 1st South African Division in Abyssinia and Egypt. After passing out of the Staff College, Haifa, Clayden returned to South Africa in 1942 as GSO II (Operations) to Coastal Area Headquarters. In 1944, he was temporarily released from military service to take part in an industrial arbitration.

In 1945, he was released from military service, and was appointed a King's Counsel later in the year. He was a member of the Military Pensions Appeal Board until he was appointed Acting Judge of the Supreme Court of South Africa on 16 March 1946. On 18 April 1946, he was appointed a Judge of the Supreme Court of South Africa, Transvaal Provincial Division.

In 1955, Clayden was appointed a Judge of the Federal Supreme Court, Federation of Rhodesia and Nyasaland. In 1960, he was promoted Chief Justice of the Federation of Rhodesia and Nyasaland. From 1964 to 1965, Clayden returned to South Africa as a Judge of the Supreme Court of South Africa. Moving to England, Clayden was appointed a chairman of Industrial Tribunals in 1967 on the recommendation of the Lord Chancellor, Lord Gardiner, serving until 1977.

Clayton chaired the Southern Rhodesia Capital Commission in 1955, the Federal Delimitation Commission in 1958, and the Rhodesian Commission of Inquiry into the 1961 Ndola United Nations DC-6 crash in 1962. He was Acting Governor-General of the Federation of Rhodesia and Nyasaland from May to June 1961.

Clayden was knighted in 1958 and was sworn of the Privy Council in 1963.

== Family ==
Clayden married Dr Gwendoline Edith Lawrance in 1946.
