= Amanie Abdelmessih =

Egyptian and American engineering educator

Amanie Nassif Abdelmessih is an Egyptian and American engineering educator specializing in mechanical engineering and heat transfer. She is a professor of mechanical engineering at California Baptist University.

== Education and career ==
Abdelmessih was educated in Egypt at Alexandria University, where she received her bachelor's degree in 1972 and a master's degree in 1979, both in chemical engineering. She completed her Ph.D. in 1987 at Oklahoma State University. Her dissertation, Laminar flow heat transfer downstream from U-bends, was supervised by Kenneth J. Bell.

She began her academic career at Northrop University. She taught at Saint Martin's University in Lacey, Washington as an associate professor from 1997 to 2002, and as a full professor from 2002 to 2013, before taking her present position at California Baptist University in 2013.

== Recognition ==
The Puget Sound Engineering Council named Abdelmessih as their Academic Engineer of the Year for 2005. She was the 2009 recipient of the Distinguished Engineering Educator Award of the Society of Women Engineers.

In 2020 the American Society of Mechanical Engineers (ASME) named her as an ASME Fellow.
