= Peter Zuze Air Force Base =

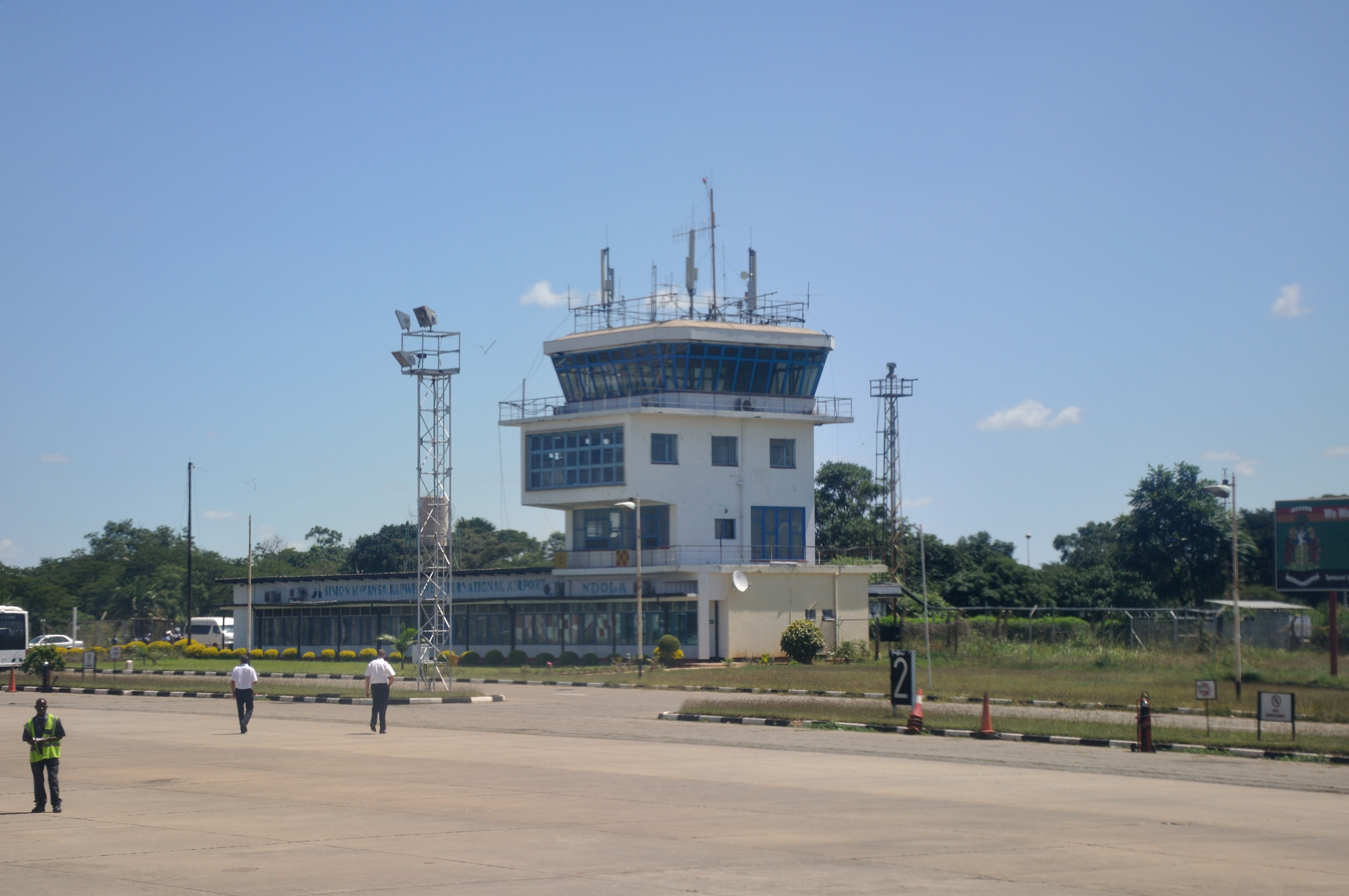
- IATA: ~~NLA~~; ICAO: FLND

Summary
- Airport type: Military
- Owner: Zambia Air Force
- Location: Ndola, Zambia
- Passenger services ceased: 7 October 2021
- Elevation AMSL: 4,170 ft (1,270 m)
- Coordinates: 12°59′50″S 28°39′50″E

Map
- Location of Peter Zuze Air Force Base in Zambia

Runways
Direction	Length		Surface
Direction	m	ft	Surface
10L/28R	2,515	8,251	Concrete
10R/28L	1,214	3,983	Concrete

Peter Zuze Air Force Base is an airbase located in the city of Ndola in the Copperbelt Province in northern Zambia. It used to be the premises of the Simon Mwansa Kapwepwe International Airport until late 2021, when Ndola's airport moved its operations 15 km (9.3 mi) to the west (adjacent to the Dag Hammarskjöld Crash Site Memorial) and this old airport address ceased to be a commercial airport. It now belongs to the Zambian Air Force.

On 30 July 2021, President Edgar Lungu decided to name this airbase after Zambia's first indigenous air commander, Peter Zuze. On 5 August 2021, President Edgar Lungu commissioned the opening of the new airport adjacent to the Dag Hammarskjöld Crash Site Memorial, although it took another two months for all operations to complete moving to the new Simon Mwansa Kapwepwe International Airport from the old location (Peter Zuze Air Force Base). The new airport officially started on 7 October 2021.

== History ==
The current location of the Peter Zuze Air Force Base (in Itawa; south-east of the city centre) was initially built as a military base for the British army in 1938. In the 1950s, it was transformed into a commercial airport to serve the city of Ndola. It was officially known as Ndola Airport before President Michael Sata renamed it in 2011 in honour of Simon Mwansa Kapwepwe, the nation's former vice president. Itawa was the location of Ndola's Airport from the 1950s until late 2021, when it moved its operations to a new airport, also in Ndola, approximately 15 km (9.3 mi) west of the city centre by road; just north of the Dag Hammarskjöld Crash Site Memorial. That new airport (Simon Mwansa Kapwepwe International Airport) was built to replace this airport as the main airport of the region.

The new airport was engineered by the Aviation Industry Corporation of China (AVIC International) at a cost of $397 million. It was expected to be completed in Mid-2020 but was delayed by setbacks due to the COVID-19 pandemic; the new airport opened the following year instead. While under construction, the new airport's name was Copperbelt International Airport and was renamed to Simon Mwansa Kapwepwe International Airport upon opening.

On 30 July 2021, President Edgar Lungu declared the old airport in Itawa as an airbase (handed over to the Zambian Air Force) and renamed it the Peter Zuze Air Force Base, named after Zambia's first indigenous air commander, Peter Zuze. On 5 August 2021, President Edgar Lungu commissioned the opening of the new airport adjacent to the Dag Hammarskjöld Crash Site Memorial and immediately, it took the name Simon Mwansa Kapwepwe International Airport from the old airport address. After the President commissioned the new airport 15 km (9.3 mi) west of the Ndola city centre, it took about two more months for all operations to complete the relocation to the new airport (it officially started on 7 October 2021).

So, the name Copperbelt International Airport only applied to the new airport while it was under construction (not in use any longer) and the name Simon Mwansa Kapwepwe International Airport remained, meaning that Ndola retained the name that it has been using since 2011 to refer to its international airport. The new airport also keeps the same IATA code. Peter Zuze Air Force Base was registered as the name of the old airport in Itawa.

== See also ==
- Simon Mwansa Kapwepwe International Airport
- Transport in Zambia
- List of airports in Zambia
