= Lightning Cycle Dynamics =

- Founded: 1992
- Products: recumbent bicycles
- Brands: Lightning Bikes
- Website: www.lightningbikes.com

Lightning is a brand of recumbent bicycles produced by Lightning Cycle Dynamics based in Lompoc, California, United States. In 1977 the first Lightning recumbent was built by three students from Northrop Institute of Technology - Tim Brummer, Don Guichard and Chris Dreike. In 1979 the teams White Lightning HPV, powered by cycle racers Jan Russell and Butch Stinton, won the Abbott prize in a Lightning recumbent for the first human-powered vehicle to break the then-common speed limit of 55 mph. A four-man team including Pete Peseyres and Bob Fourney set the fastest time for the 1989 Race Across America, a record that still stands. They have also won the STP (Seattle to Portland) and Paul Mitchell (San Francisco to Los Angeles) Challenge, among other achievements. Today Lightning Cycle Dynamics produces recumbent bicycles and carbon cranks. All of the bikes are made in the U.S.

== Models ==
=== Phantom D ===
The Phantom uses a mono-tube design for simplicity and lower cost, while keeping the same geometry as the P-38 model and includes disc brakes.

e-Lightning

The e-Lightning is based on the Phantom D with an electric motor upgrade. The e-Lightning has superior comfort, stopping, safety, and watt hour efficiency compared to upright e bikes.

=== P-38 ===
The P-38 uses a patented space frame, consisting of small diameter tubes arranged in a three-dimensional triangular shape. It is considered a short wheelbase recumbent, with the front wheel behind the pedals and cranks. The P-38 also comes in a Rox version with thicker tubes, reinforcement and steel seat frame for heavier riders.

=== P-38 Voyager ===
The P-38 Voyager is a version of the P-38 that disassembles and can be carried in a large wheeled carrying case, or checked as luggage for air travel. It takes about 30 minutes to reassemble the bike.

=== F-40 ===
The F-40 is a full-faired (enclosed) streamlined recumbent, using the P-38 frame inside, along with an aluminum frame and fabric fairing in the rear, and a fiberglass nose piece. The fairing improves aerodynamics and allows much higher speeds to be attained with similar pedaling effort. The F-40 set twelve world bicycle speed records.

=== R-84 ===
The R-84 recumbent has a similar geometry to the P-38 and Phantom, but is constructed from carbon fiber, resulting in a lighter total bike weight and increase frame stiffness. It also incorporates rear suspension.

=== F-90 ===
The F-90 is similar to the F-40 but uses the R-84 carbon fiber frame along with a kevlar and mylar sailcloth midsection, instead of the fabric used in the F-40. Lightning claims that the F-90 is the fastest production bicycle available on the market for purchase.

=== Previous Models ===
- Thunderbolt (no longer in production)
- Stealth (renamed to Phantom)
- Phantom II (no longer in production)

They also make cranksets.

== See also ==
- List of bicycle manufacturers
