= Mongi Slim =

Tunisian politician and diplomat (1908–1969)

- منجي سليم
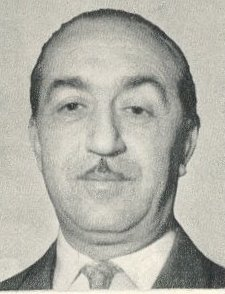

23rd President of the United Nations General Assembly
- In office 1960–1961
- Preceded by: Frederick Henry Boland
- Succeeded by: Muhammad Zafrulla Khan

Minister of Foreign Affairs of Tunisia
- In office 1962–1964
- Preceded by: Sadok Mokadem
- Succeeded by: Habib Bourguiba Jr.

Personal details
- Born: September 15, 1908 Tunis, French Tunisia
- Died: October 23, 1969 (aged 61) Tunis, Tunisia
- Party: Neo Destour

Mongi Slim (Arabic: منجي سليم; September 15, 1908 – October 23, 1969) was a Tunisian diplomat who became the first African to become the President of the United Nations General Assembly in 1961. He received a degree from the faculty of law of the University of Paris. He was twice imprisoned by the French during the Tunisian struggle for independence.

== Early years ==
Born on September 15, 1908, in Tunis, French Tunisia (present-day, Tunisia) Slim came from an aristocratic family of Greek and Turkish origin. His mother was a member of the Beyrum family, a noble Turkish family which had risen to prominence in Tunis, and was famous throughout the Arab world for its learnedness in Islamic law. One of Slim's great-grandfathers, a Greek named Kafkalas, was captured as a boy by pirates, and sold to the Bey of Tunis, who educated and freed him and then made him his minister of defense. His paternal grandfather was an aristocratic Caid who ruled the wealthy province of Cape Bon.

== Political career ==
In 1936, Slim became involved in organizations advocating Tunisia's independence from France. In 1954, he became the chief Tunisian negotiator in discussions with France on independence. In this position, he helped draft protocols which secured Tunisia's independence in 1956. Slim served as an interior minister of Tunisia from 1955 to 1956.

In 1956 he became Tunisia's ambassador to the United States, Canada and the United Nations. He became involved in a special United Nations Committee on the problem of Hungary and served as a delegate to the United Nations Security Council. He relinquished his posts as ambassador to the United States and Canada in 1961 when he was unanimously elected president of the United Nations General Assembly after a plane crash that killed U.N. Secretary General Dag Hammarskjöld. Slim made the cover of Time magazine in September 1961. The United States came up with a plan to have Slim carry out the duties of Secretary-General while delegating his own duties to a vice-president of the General Assembly. However, the Soviet Union favored U Thant of Burma, and secured a U.S. agreement to appoint him acting Secretary-General for the remainder of Hammarskjöld's term.

Slim left the United Nations in 1962 and became Minister of Foreign Affairs of Tunisia. He served in that position until 1964.

Diplomatic posts
| Preceded by Frederick Henry Boland | President of the United Nations General Assembly; 1961–1962 | Succeeded by Muhammad Zafrulla Khan |
