= United Nations Security Council Resolution 229 =

UN Security Council Resolution 229
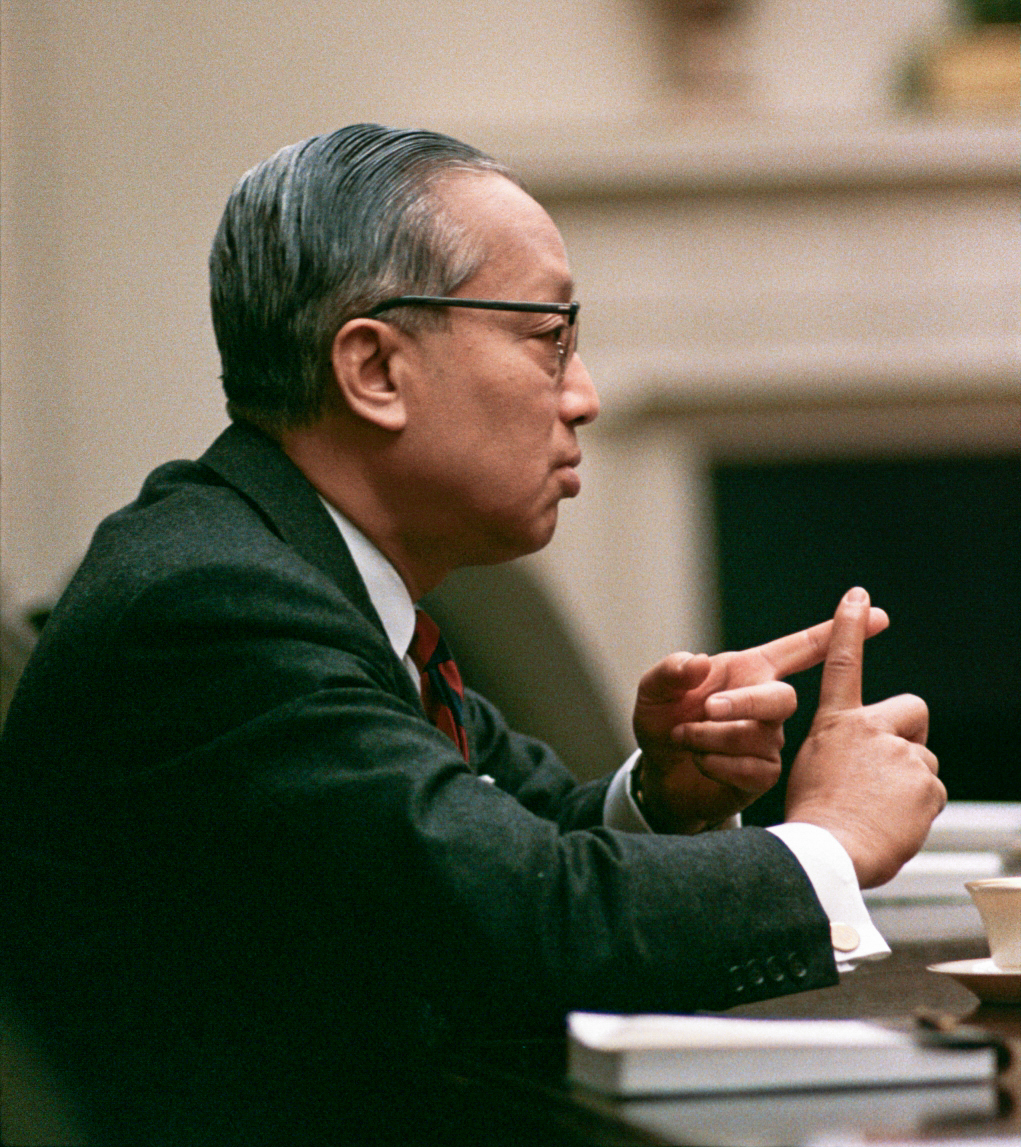
- U Thant
- Date: December 2 1966
- Meeting no.: 1329
- Subject: Recommendation regarding the appointment of the Secretary-General
- Result: Adopted

Security Council composition
- Permanent members: China; France; Soviet Union; United Kingdom; United States
- Non-permanent members: Argentina; Bulgaria; Japan; Jordan; Mali; Netherlands; New Zealand; Nigeria; Uganda; Uruguay

United Nations Security Council Resolution 229 was adopted by the United Nations Security Council on December 2, 1966 after a closed meeting to select the Secretary-General. The Council, "conscious of the proven qualities of high sense of duty of U Thant, and believing that his reappointment would be most conductive to the larger interests and purposes of the Organization", recommended his appointment for another term as Secretary-General. It is the most recent instance in which the Republic of China voted on the recommendation for Secretary-General; all future selections have involved the participation of the People's Republic of China.

== See also ==
- United Nations Secretary-General selection, 1961#1966 selection
- List of United Nations Security Council Resolutions 201 to 300 (1965–1971)
