= Gordon Novel =

American private investigator

- Born: 7 February 1938; New Orleans, Louisiana, United States
- Died: 3 October 2012 (aged 74); Los Angeles, California, U.S.
- Education: Northrop Aeronautical Institute of Technology, University of Southern California, Louisiana State University
- Occupations: Inventor; Private investigator Ufologist

Gordon Michael Duane Novel (Note: Court documents note his middle name to be "Duane", but many other sources note "Dwayne" or "Dwane".) (February 7, 1938 – October 3, 2012) was a private investigator and electronics expert, (Note: The FBI described Novel as a "former electronics salesman".) who was known for several controversial investigations. He was most notable for his conflict with District Attorney Jim Garrison and his work as investigator for automobile industry executive John DeLorean and U.S. Attorney General Ramsey Clark.

== Early life ==
Novel grew up in New Orleans living as an only child with his mother. He graduated from East Jefferson High School in 1956, spent a brief period studying engineering at Northrop Aeronautical Institute of Technology, the University of Southern California and tried motion picture directing classes at the Pasadena Playhouse. He met his former wife, Marlene Mancuso, Miss New Orleans 1958, at the Louisiana State University.

== Career ==
In 1960, Novel bought a dragstrip in Hammond, Louisiana, together with associate Ranny Ehlinger. Later he produced auto shows in New Orleans, Baton Rouge and Atlanta.

=== Bay of Pigs weapons ===
In February 1961 Novel was part of a group of people which stole weapons from a munitions bunker in Houma, Louisiana, which was owned by the Schlumberger Company. Novel claimed the theft had been planned by Guy Banister and David Ferrie, who at the time were actively involved in the anti-communist/anti-Castro groups. According to a report in the New Orleans States-Item newspaper Banister served as a munitions supplier for the 1961 Bay of Pigs Invasion and continued to deal weapons from his office until 1963. Gus Russo has written about the existence of a letter of marque, signed by Robert F. Kennedy, who was U.S. Attorney General at the time, which supposedly gave Banister the go-ahead to "liberate" the weaponry although the letter has never been proved to have existed. Novel claimed to have received a key to the bunker from Banister. The stolen munitions were allegedly stored at Banister's office in Camp Street, New Orleans and at Ferrie's house. Novel claimed that the act was not illegal but had been arranged by the CIA as part of Operation Mongoose. While taking a lie detector test, Novel stated that the burglary was not a burglary at all, but a war materials pickup made at the direction of his CIA contact.

=== 1964 New York World's Fair ===
In the early 60's, Novel served as Director of Operations for the 'Bourbon Street Pavilion' at the 1964 New York World's Fair. The pavilion reportedly achieved the highest gross income of any single commercial pavilion at the fair. For this work, Novel was called an "Entrepreneurial Prodigy & Boy Wonder"" in Variety. From the beginning of the fair's build-up in 1963 he handled publicity at the pavilion, using the name "G. Michael Novel" he gave several interviews to the press. Variety magazine recognized him as being the major entertainment buyer, in charge of the pavilion's entertainment policies and originally active in obtaining backing for the venture. Owner and founder of 'Mardi Gras World', Blaine Kern, worked with Novel at both the 1964 World's Fair and the 1984 Louisiana World Exposition.

=== New Orleans business ===
After the world fair closed, Novel moved back to New Orleans, where he set up a business focused on electronic eavesdropping. Through his company, 'International Dynamics Corp', he manufactured and installed electronics for politicians, businessmen and diplomats. He also bought/leased a Caribbean-style restaurant/club called 'Jamaican Village Inn', which was located at 800 North Rampart Street. While Novel was in Ohio, resisting Garrison's attempt to get him extradited, two waitresses of the club were arrested and charged with violating obscenity law, for topless table-serving. The club was ordered to be padlock closed for one year by the district attorney's office. This order was withdrawn after the club owner Edward Centa agreed to end the topless attire, while the lease to Novel was ruled invalid.

=== Conflict with Garrison ===
==== Work at Garrison's office ====
According to the final report issued by the Assassination Records Review Board, Novel came to the attention of Garrison after allegedly making claims that he was an employee of the CIA in 1963 and knew both Lee Harvey Oswald and Jack Ruby. Journalist Dick J. Reavis has stated that Novel's work at Garrison's office was "amply documented" and quoted Novel saying: "I was working as Garrison's chief of security, while at the same time working for the White House to destabilize Garrison's operation." In 1997, an FBI report was released which stated that Novel worked with Garrison in attempts to fake photographic evidence to link Fidel Castro with the assassination.

==== Shaw Hearing Witness Subpoena ====
During Clay Shaw's preliminary hearing, Novel was twice subpoenaed to appear before the Orleans Parish Grand Jury. The second time Novel did not show up, while he had left the state. In order to get Novel extradited, Garrison's office issued two warrants for Novel's arrest. The first arrest warrant was based on him being a material witness in the Clay Shaw investigation, which historically labeled him as "the missing witness" in Garrison's assassination conspiracy theory.

The second arrest warrant was based on a new accusation; Garrison accused Novel of having "burglarized" the munitions bunker in Houma. During the same time-frame, on 25 May 1967, the New Orleans States-Item published a detailed article on the Clay Shaw case. In that article the New Orleans States-Item produced a handwritten letter, that experts identified as Novel's handwriting, which referred to a CIA connection to his advertising agency. Until then Novel had publicly denied any CIA connections. After the letter was revealed, Novel's attorney, Steve Plotkin, said that Novel wrote the letter and that Novel had CIA connections in New Orleans. While holding off his extradition, Novel organized a news conference in Columbus, Ohio, where he publicly defended himself against Garrison's accusation of burglary. During the conference, reporters were told that; there were CIA operations in New Orleans, an advertising agency in New Orleans (which was operated by Novel) did indeed serve as a CIA front, that the raid on the Houma munitions bunker was a "patriotic act". Later on, Plotkin further specified Novel's role as an "intermediary", but added that Novel's work had "little or nothing to do with the Bay of Pigs invasion and certainly had absolutely nothing to do with the assassination of President Kennedy". The extradition proceedings were eventually dropped on 3 July 1967, due to defects/incomplete extradition papers.

=== Novel vs Garrison-Playboy Libel Suit ===
In an October 1967 interview for Playboy Magazine, Garrison accused Novel of being a paid employee of the CIA and hinted at complicity in the JFK assassination. Subsequently, Novel filed a $10-million libel suit against Garrison and Playboy in Federal Court, being represented by Elmer Gertz, who was an expert in reputation damage and smear campaigns. In his book "To Life" Gertz stated that Novel's deposition ran into "hundreds, if not thousands, of pages". Eventually, the case did not come to trial but was instead dismissed by Judge William J. Campbell after the defendants moved for a reconsideration of their motions.

=== J. Edgar Hoover allegations ===
In an episode of the PBS program Frontline aired on February 9, 1993, Novel said he saw photos of FBI director J. Edgar Hoover engaged in oral sex with his aide Clyde Tolson. The episode incorporated the work of author Anthony Summers whose book Official and Confidential: The Secret Life of J. Edgar Hoover alleged that Novel said he was shown the photo by CIA counterintelligence chief James Jesus Angleton.

=== Watergate ===
In 1974, columnist Jack Anderson wrote that Charles Colson consulted Novel on the possible use of a degaussing device that could erase copies of the Watergate tapes stored in the White House and the CIA from a distance. Eventually, Colson and Novel mutually decided not to do this, because of its danger to other national security tapes and computers. According to Colson, the plan never came close to development.

=== New Orleans firebomb case ===
Jim Garrison's successor to the seat of district attorney Harry Connick Sr. brought charges against Novel for conspiracy to firebomb part of New Orleans by balloons on behalf of a world's fair Novel was promoting. After three previous prosecutions, that included a hung jury, a mistrial and a conviction with three-year sentence, the conviction was overturned due to "tremendous conflicts" in government testimony. Columnist Jack Anderson reported that "Eminent legal scholars say a fourth prosecution in a non-capital case is virtually unprecedented, and raises the issue of retaliatory prosecution". Connick denied there was intention to "persecute" Novel.

=== DeLorean ===
Novel worked as private investigator to the DeLorean Motor Company chairman John DeLorean in 1982, and subsequently became a business partner. DeLorean claimed there was a conspiracy between Britain's Conservative Party and U.S. and British intelligence agents to close DeLorean's manufacturing plant in Northern Ireland. DeLorean's claims relied on Gordon Novel's investigation and resulting evidence. The alleged conspiracy included an attempt to frame/entrap DeLorean for cocaine trafficking, against which DeLorean eventually successfully defended himself in the resulting lawsuit. Part of the defense was an audiotape, which was made public by Hustler magazine publisher Larry Flynt, which revealed DeLorean was the victim of a sting operation. When Flynt refused to name Novel as the supplier of the tape, he was charged and convicted to a 5 1/2 month sentence for contempt of court.

=== Waco ===
Novel was hired as chief investigator by former U.S. Attorney General Ramsey Clark, in the aftermath of the Waco Siege of 1993. Ramsey Clark provided legal counsel for some of the surviving members of Branch Davidian, as well as more than a hundred family members of those who had died or were injured in the confrontation. Novel has stated that his analysis of a FLIR tape, made by a Nightstalker aircraft, indicates serious misconduct, e.g. federal agents firing upon people inside the compound while they were trying to flee the fire. Former CIA Director William Colby collaborated with Novel on the investigation of misconduct on the higher levels of command including the FBI. Novel originated allegations that U.S. Federal agents were guilty of murdering David Koresh's followers during the Waco siege.

=== Celebrity advice ===
As a private investigator, Novel gave strategic advice to various celebrities, among which were John Delorean, Michael Jackson and Jean-Claude Van Damme.
