= 1961 Ndola Transair Sweden Douglas DC-6 crash =

1961 aircraft crash in Northern Rhodesia

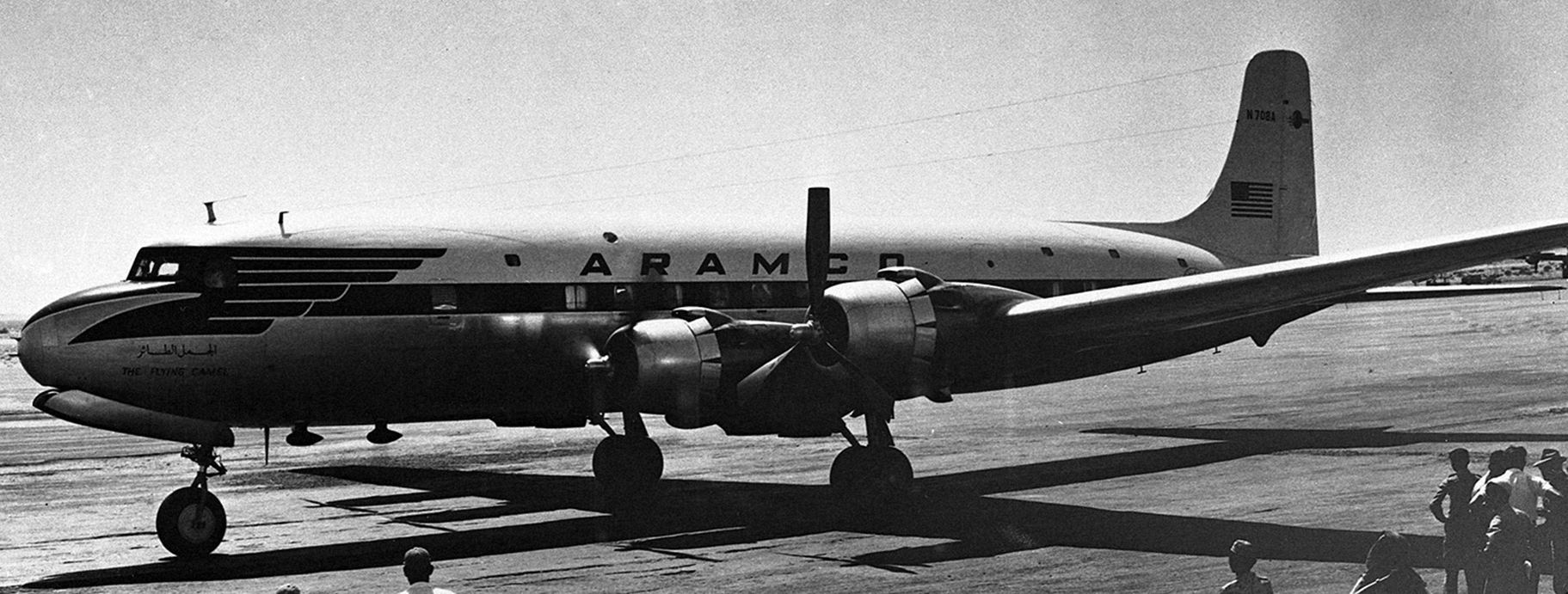
- The aircraft involved, while still in service with Aramco in 1959

Occurrence
- Date: 18 September 1961
- Summary: Crashed to the ground, disputed reasons: pilot error or external attack
- Site: 15 km (9.3 mi) W of Ndola Airport (NLA) Zambia; 12°58′31″S 28°31′22″E

Aircraft
- Aircraft type: Douglas DC-6B
- Aircraft name: Albertina
- Operator: Transair Sweden on behalf of the United Nations
- Registration: SE-BDY
- Flight origin: Elisabethville Airport Congo
- Stopover: Léopoldville-N'Djili Airport (FIH/FZAA), Congo
- Destination: Ndola Airport (NLA/FLND), Northern Rhodesia
- Occupants: 16
- Passengers: 11
- Crew: 5
- Fatalities: 16 (15 initially)
- Survivors: 0 (1 initially)

On 18 September 1961, a DC-6 passenger aircraft of Transair Sweden operating for the United Nations (UN) crashed near Ndola, Northern Rhodesia (present-day Zambia). The crash resulted in the deaths of all people on board, including Dag Hammarskjöld, the second secretary-general of the United Nations, and 15 others. Hammarskjöld had been en route to ceasefire negotiations with Moïse Tshombe during the Congo Crisis. Three official inquiries failed to conclusively determine the cause. Some historians and military experts like Susan Williams have criticized the official inquiries, pointing to evidence of foul play that had been omitted from the inquiries.

Hammarskjöld's death caused a succession crisis at the UN when the Security Council was tasked with selecting his successor.

== Aircraft and crew ==
The aircraft was a Douglas DC-6B, c/n 43559/251, registered in Sweden as SE-BDY, first flown in 1952 and powered by four Pratt & Whitney R-2800 18-cylinder radial piston engines. It was flown by captain Per Hallonquist (35), first officer Lars Litton (29) and flight engineer Nils Göran Wilhelmsson.

== UN special report ==
A special report issued by the UN stated that a bright flash in the sky was seen at approximately 01:00 that resulted in the initiation of search-and-rescue operations. Initial indications that the crash might not have been an accident led to multiple official inquiries and persistent speculation that the secretary-general was assassinated.

== Official inquiries ==
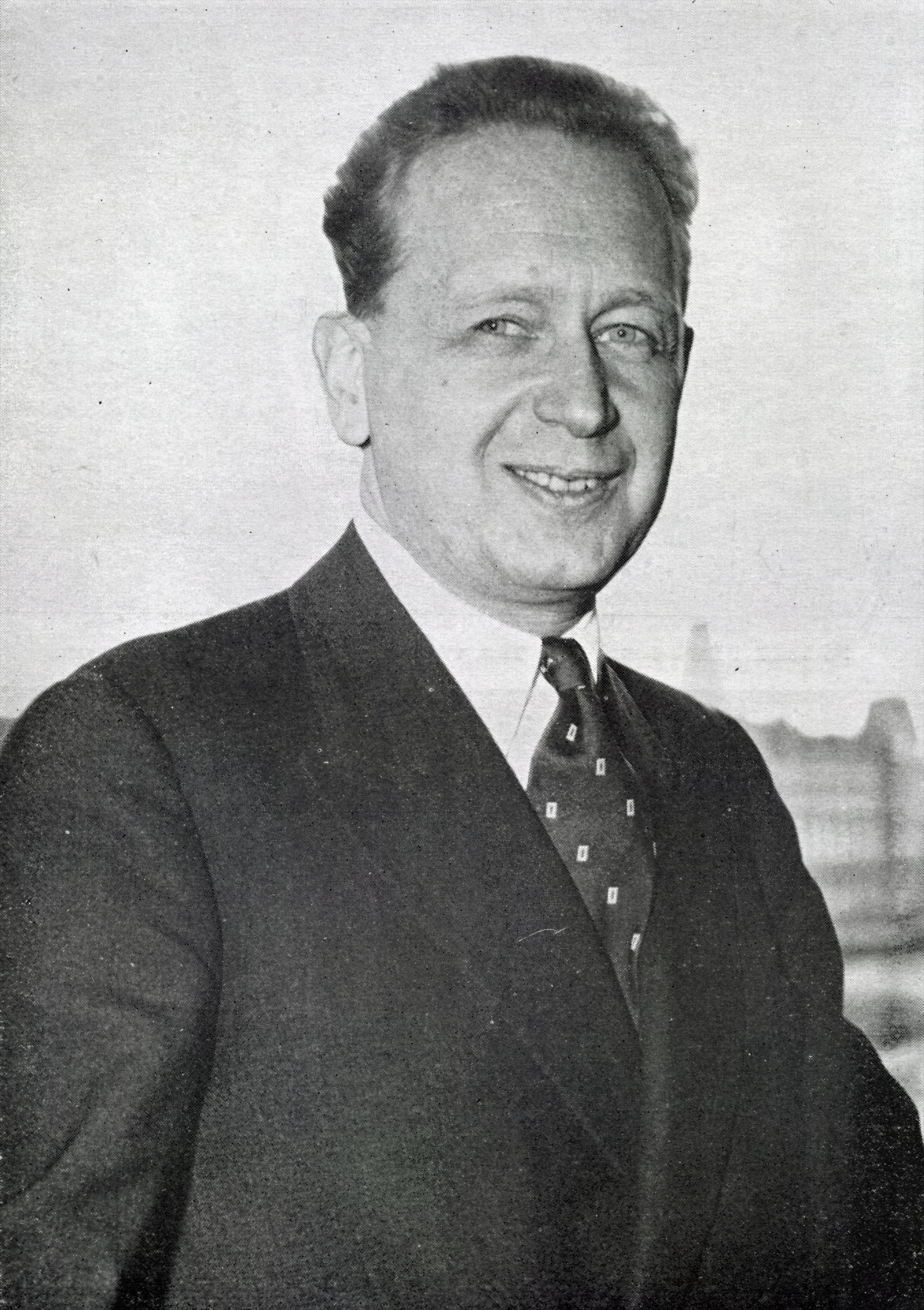
Dag Hammarskjöld, 1950s

=== 1960s ===
Following the death of Hammarskjöld, there were three inquiries into the circumstances that led to the crash: the Rhodesian Board of Investigation, the Rhodesian Commission of Inquiry and the UN Commission of Investigation.

The Rhodesian Board of Investigation investigated between 19 September 1961 and 2 November 1961 under the command of Lt. Colonel M.C.B. Barber. The Rhodesian Commission of Inquiry, under the chairmanship of Sir John Clayden, held hearings from 16 to 29 January 1962 without UN oversight. The subsequent UN Commission of Investigation held a series of hearings in 1962 and depended partly upon the testimony from the previous Rhodesian inquiries. Five "eminent persons" were assigned by the new secretary-general to the UN commission. The members of the commission unanimously elected Nepalese diplomat Rishikesh Shah to head an inquiry.

The three official inquiries failed to conclusively determine the cause. The Rhodesian Board of Investigation sent 180 men to search a six-square-kilometre area of the last sector of the aircraft's flight path, but no evidence of a bomb, surface-to-air missile or hijacking was found. Analysis of the wreckage showed a lack of bullet or bomb perforations which could have brought down the plane. Additionally, damage to nearby trees suggest a shallow rate of descent inconsistent with a shoot down. The official report stated that two of the dead Swedish bodyguards had suffered multiple bullet wounds. Medical examination performed by the initial Rhodesian Board of Investigation and reported in the UN official report indicated that the wounds were superficial and that the bullets showed no signs of rifling, meaning that they had not passed though the barrel of a gun. The report concluded that cartridges had exploded in the fire near the bodyguards. The Rhodesian board concluded that the pilot flew too low and struck trees, thereby bringing the aircraft down, but was unable to determine the cause of the pilot error, leaving the mystery unsolved.

Previous accounts of a bright flash in the sky were dismissed as having occurred too late in the evening to have caused the crash. The UN report speculated that these flashes may have been caused by secondary explosions after the crash. Sergeant Harold Julien, who initially survived the crash but died five days later, indicated that there was a series of explosions that preceded the crash. The official inquiry found that the statements of witnesses who talked with Julien before he died in hospital five days after the crash were inconsistent.

The report states that there were three delays that violated established search-and-rescue procedures. The first delayed the initial alarm of a possible plane in trouble; the second delayed the "distress" alarm, which indicates that communications with surrounding airports indicate that a missing plane has not landed elsewhere; and the third delayed the eventual search-and-rescue operation and the discovery of the plane wreckage nearby. The medical examiner's report was inconclusive; one report said that Hammarskjöld had died on impact, but another stated that he might have survived had rescue operations not been delayed. The report also concluded that the probability of Julien surviving the crash would have been "infinitely" better had the rescue operations been quicker.

=== 2013 ===
Swedish accident investigator Sven Hammarberg prepared a report, submitted to The Hammarskjöld Commission as part of a new inquiry into the accident. It was discovered that the original Rhodesian investigation had missed a vital clue in 1961. The approach chart available to the pilots at the time did not depict a large hill to the west of Ndolo, along the route of the Albertina. The hill at an elevation of 4,300 feet is believed to have obscured the airport from sight as the plane descended on its approach. The lack of evidence of weapon damage to the wreck's fuselage, pilot fatigue, and uncharted obstacles, led Hammarberg to conclude the crash was a result of a controlled flight into terrain. The report eventually led to the book The Death of Dag Hammarskjöld: How the Cold War Turned an Accident into an Assassination being published in 2022 by author Steven Webb, which cites the 2013 Hammarberg report, discussing the cause of the accident and the numerous conspiracy theories around it.

=== 2015 ===
On 16 March 2015, UN secretary-general Ban Ki-moon appointed members to an independent panel of experts to examine new information. The panel was led by Mohamed Chande Othman (the Chief Justice of Tanzania) and also included Kerryn Macaulay (Australia's representative to ICAO) and Henrik Larsen (a ballistics expert from the Danish National Police). The report was delivered to the secretary-general on 12 June 2015. The panel's 99-page report, released on 6 July 2015, assigned "moderate" value to nine new eyewitness accounts and transcripts of radio transmissions. Those accounts suggested that Hammarskjöld's plane was already on fire as it landed and that other jet aircraft and intelligence agents were nearby.

=== 2024 ===
A new report, issued in October 2024, highlighted that some UN member states released new information to UN investigators. However "specific and crucial" information related to the crash and surrounding circumstances continues to be withheld by a handful of governments.

== Allegations of foul play ==
Despite the multiple official inquiries that failed to find evidence of assassination or other forms of foul play, several people have continued to advance theories involving hostile interests. At the time of Hammarskjöld's death, the Central Intelligence Agency and other Western agencies were involved in the political situation in the Congo, which culminated in Belgian and American support for the secession of Katanga and the assassination of former prime minister Patrice Lumumba. The Belgian government had a vested interest in maintaining its control over much of the country's copper industry during the Congolese transition from colonial rule to independence. Concerns about the nationalisation of the copper industry could have provided a financial incentive to remove either Lumumba or Hammarskjöld.

The official inquiry has come under scrutiny and criticism from some historians who claim that some of the official determinations were issued in order to deflect attention on the assassination angle and that evidence of assassination was dismissed. Critics have assailed the conclusion that the bullet wounds found in some victims could have been caused by ammunition exploding in a fire, as some expert tests have determined that exploding bullets could not break the surface of the skin. Major C. F. Westell, a ballistics authority, said, "I can certainly describe as sheer nonsense the statement that cartridges of machine guns or pistols detonated in a fire can penetrate a human body." He based his statement on a large-scale experiment that had been conducted to determine whether military fire brigades would be in danger working near munitions depots. Other experts conducted and filmed tests showing that bullets heated to the point of explosion did not achieve sufficient velocity to penetrate the containers in which they were stored.

The day after the crash, former US president Harry Truman commented that Hammarskjöld "was on the point of getting something done when they killed him. Notice that I said 'when they killed him'."

On 19 August 1998, archbishop Desmond Tutu, chairman of South Africa's Truth and Reconciliation Commission (TRC), stated that recently uncovered letters had implicated MI5, the CIA and South African intelligence services in the crash. One TRC letter said that a bomb in the aircraft's wheel bay was set to detonate when the wheels descended for landing. Tutu's commission were unable to investigate the truth of the letters or the allegations that South African or Western intelligence agencies played a role in the crash. The British Foreign Office suggested that the letters may have been created as means of Soviet misinformation or disinformation.

In a 2005 interview, Norwegian army major general Bjørn Egge, who had been the first UN officer to see Hammarskjöld's body, claimed that Hammarskjöld had a hole in his forehead and that the hole was subsequently airbrushed from postmortem photos. Egge believed that Hammarskjöld had been thrown from the plane and that grass and leaves in his hands might indicate that he had survived the crash and tried to scramble away from the wreckage. Egge did not claim that the hole in Hammarskjöld's head was the result of a gunshot wound.

According to numerous witnesses interviewed by Swedish aid worker Göran Björkdahl in the 2000s, Hammarskjöld's plane was downed by another aircraft. Björkdahl reviewed previously unavailable archive documents and internal UN communications and believed that the plane was intentionally downed for the benefit of mining companies such as Union Minière.

In 2011, the book Who Killed Hammarskjold? by Susan Williams outlined several doubts about the accidental nature of the crash. It led to the formation of an independent, unofficial commission headed by the British jurist Stephen Sedley in 2012 to determine whether there was new evidence that would justify the UN reopening its 1962 inquiry. The Sedley commission's report was presented on 9 September 2013 at the Peace Palace in The Hague. It recommended that the UN reopen its inquiry "pursuant to General Assembly resolution 1759 (XVII) of 26 October 1962." In March 2015, Mohamed Chande Othman was appointed to support the UN's ongoing Hammarskjöld Commission.

In April 2014, The Guardian published allegations implicating military pilot Jan van Risseghem, who was Tshombe's pilot in Katanga. The article claimed that American NSA employee Charles Southall, working at the NSA listening station in Cyprus in 1961 shortly after midnight on the night of the crash, heard an intercept of a pilot's commentary in the air over Ndola, 5,300 km (3,300 mi) away. Southall recalled the pilot saying: "I see a transport plane coming low. All the lights are on. I'm going down to make a run on it. Yes, it is the Transair DC-6. It's the plane," adding that the pilot's voice was "cool and professional." Southall then heard the sound of gunfire and the pilot exclaiming: "I've hit it. There are flames! It's going down. It's crashing!" Based on Katangese Air Force records, a Fouga CM.170 Magister was the aircraft most likely involved, and the website Belgian Wings claims that van Risseghem piloted Magisters for the KAF in 1961. Another article was published by The Guardian in January 2019 repeating the allegations against van Risseghem and citing further circumstantial evidence uncovered by the producers of the documentary Cold Case Hammarskjöld, including refutations of van Risseghem's alibi that he was not flying at the time of the crash.

In December 2018, the German freelance historian Torben Gülstorff published an article in the Lobster magazine arguing that a German Dornier DO-28A may have been used for the attack. The plane was delivered to Katanga by end of August 1961 and would have been technically capable of accomplishing the shootdown.

== Memorial ==
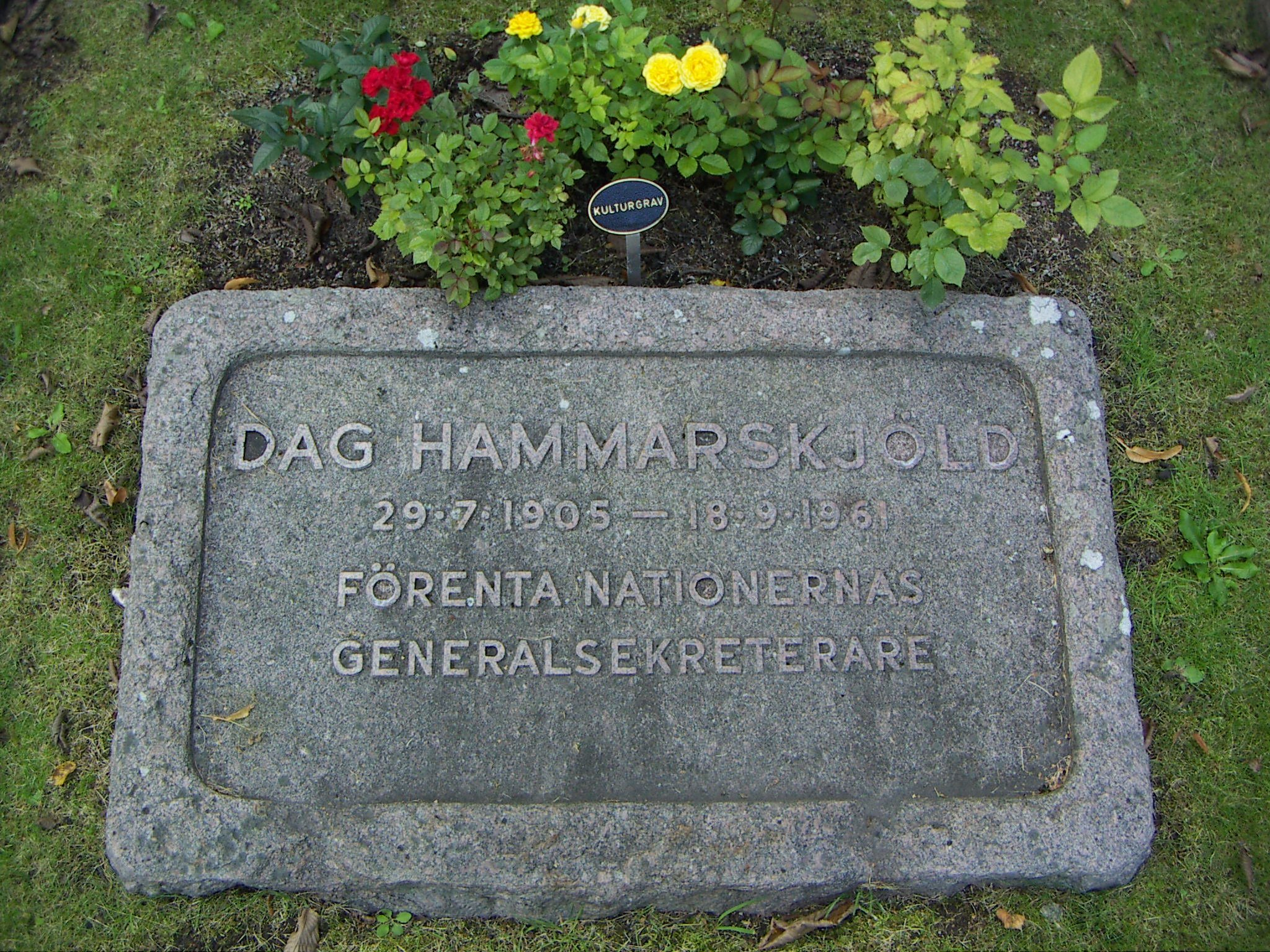
Hammarskjöld's grave in Uppsala

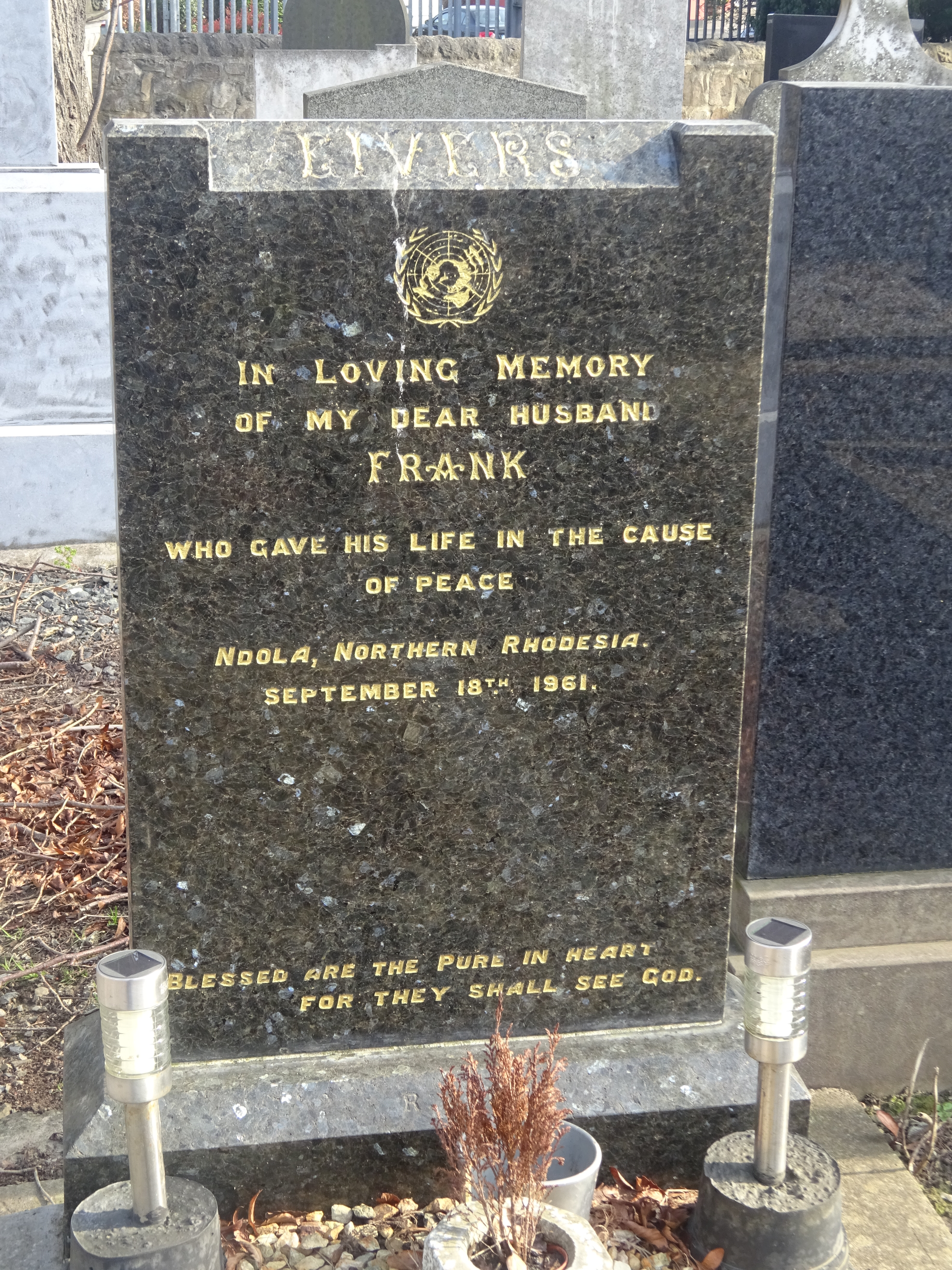
Grave in Mount Jerome, Dublin of Sgt Frank Eivers, an Irish Army soldier who was also on the plane.

The Dag Hammarskjöld Crash Site Memorial is under consideration for inclusion as a UNESCO World Heritage Site. A press release issued by the prime minister of the Republic of the Congo (Léopoldville) stated that "... in order to pay a tribute to this great man, now vanished from the scene, and to his colleagues, all of whom have fallen victim to the shameless intrigues of the great financial Powers of the West... the Government has decided to proclaim Tuesday, 19 September 1961, a day of national mourning."

== In popular culture ==
The crash was featured by the Canadian documentary series Mayday in season 15, episode 5. "Deadly Mission" and Air Crash Investigation Special Report in season 3, episode 3 titled "VIP on Board". Mayday is also repackaged as Air Disasters; "Deadly Mission" was season 9, episode 10, first broadcast December 3, 2017 for that series.

The crash is featured in the 2016 film The Siege of Jadotville, where it is shot down by an F-4 Phantom fighter jet.
