= Knut Hagrup =

Norwegian aviator

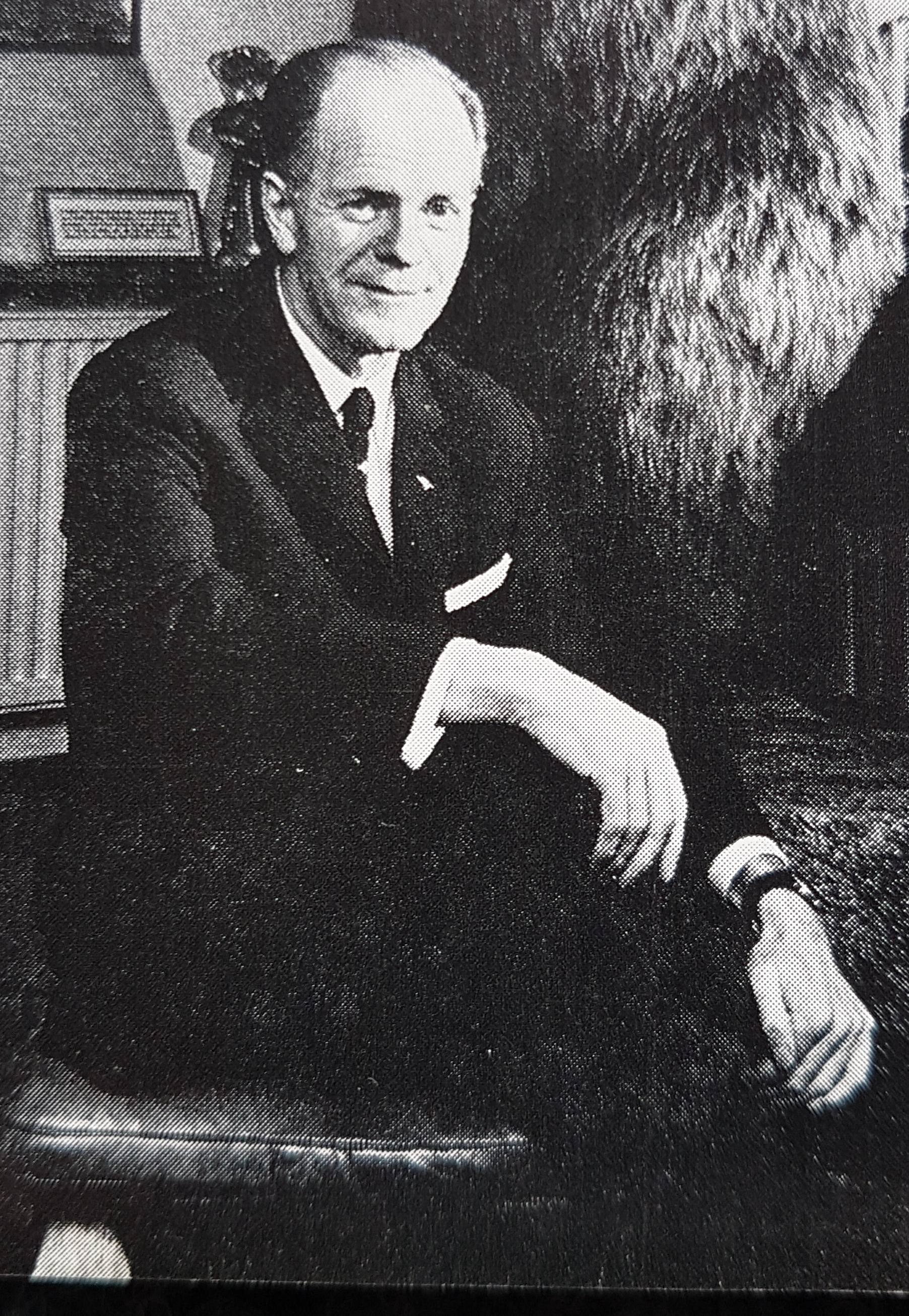
- Born: 13 November 1913; Bergen, Norway
- Died: 15 May 2003 (aged 89)

Knut Hagrup (né Hagerup-Svendsen; 13 November 1913 – 15 May 2003) was a Norwegian aviator. He was born in Bergen to Henry Lie-Svendsen and Ebba Hagerup . He served with the exiled Norwegian Armed Forces and the Royal Norwegian Air Force in the United Kingdom from 1941 to 1945, as a pilot and a technical officer. He was assigned with the Scandinavian Airlines from 1946, and was manager of the company from 1969 to 1978. After his retirement he was appointed professor at the Northrop University in Inglewood, California. Among his publications are Flyet i fare from 1975, and his thesis How the aerospace-industry of western Europe will survive from 1981.
