= Dag Hammarskjöld Crash Site Memorial =

Memorial in Copperbelt Province, Zambia

Coordinates: 12°58′29″S 28°31′22″E

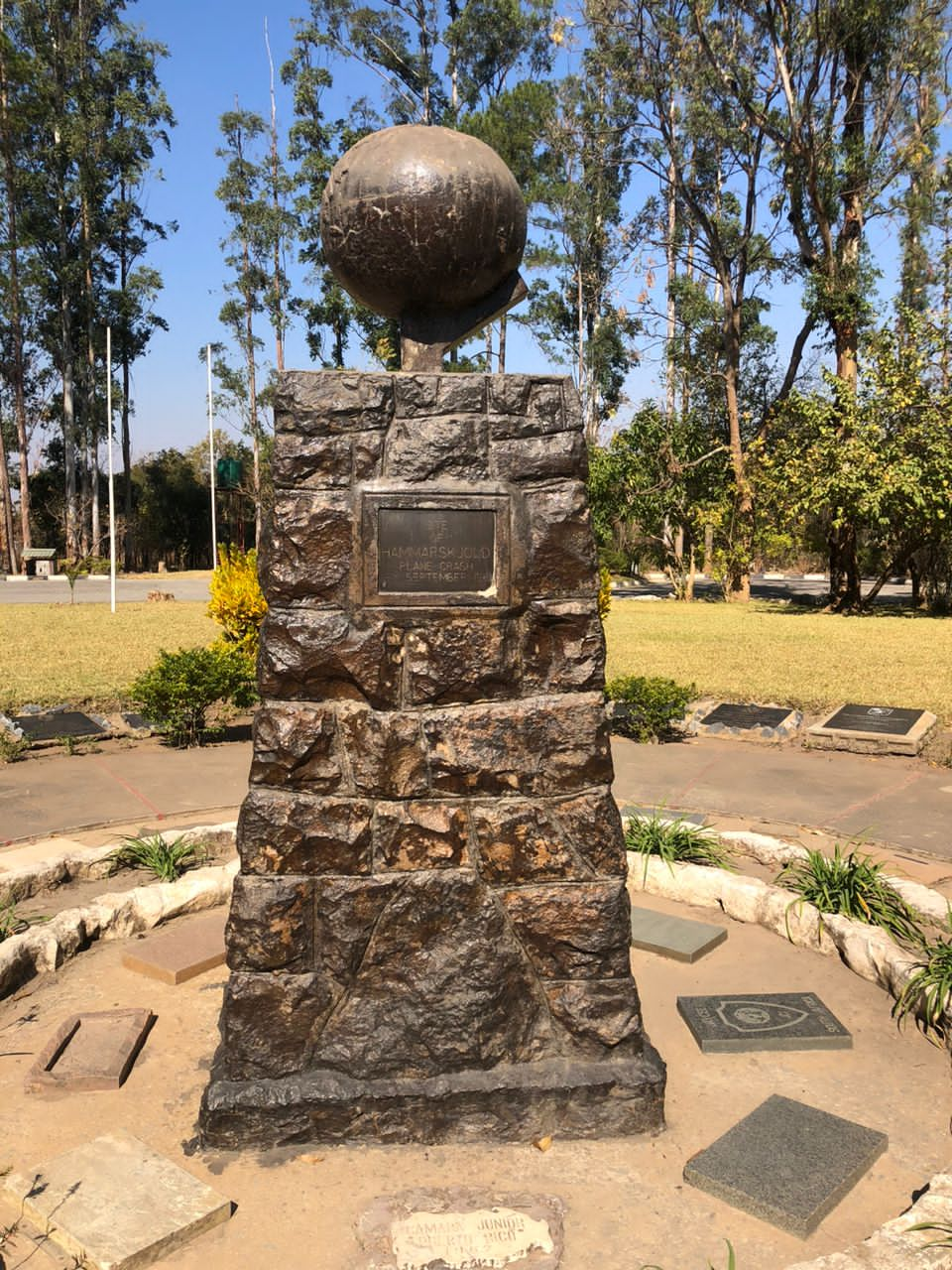
The memorial located at the crash site

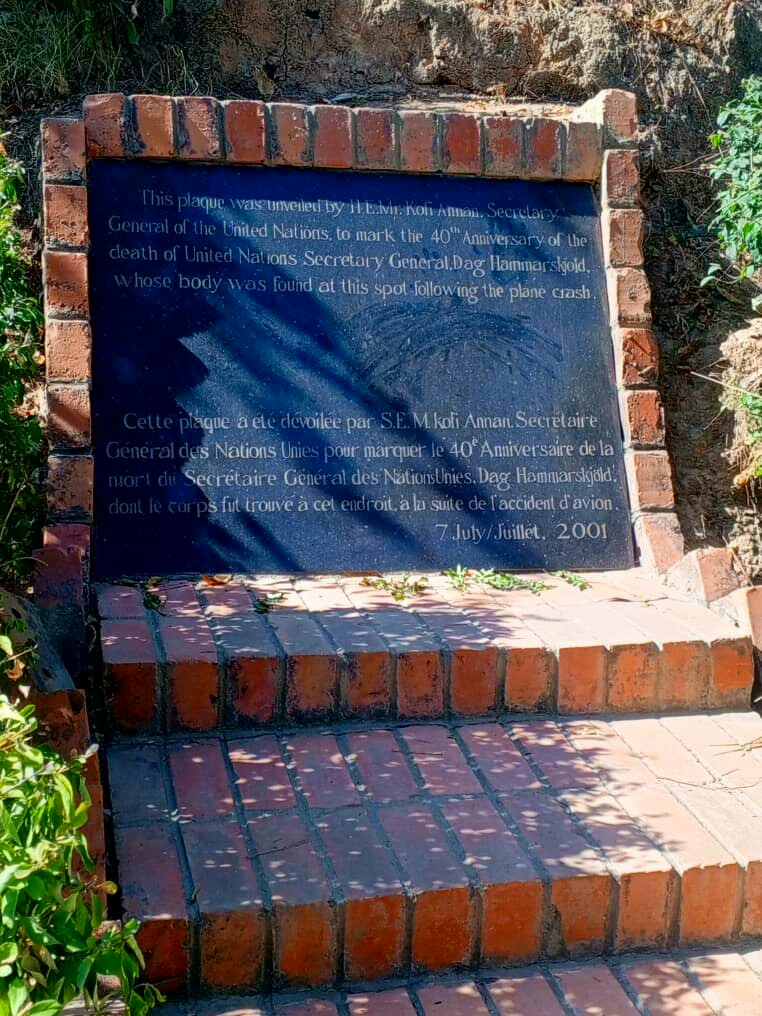
Plaque marking where Hammarskjöld's body was discovered, unveiled by Secretary-General Kofi Annan on the 40th anniversary of the crash in 2001

The Dag Hammarskjöld Memorial Crash Site marks the place of the plane crash in which Dag Hammarskjöld, the second and then-sitting Secretary-General of the United Nations was killed on 17 September 1961, while on a mission to the Léopoldville Congo Republic (now the Democratic Republic of the Congo). The site is located 10 km west of Ndola, in the Copperbelt Province of Zambia.

== Site description ==
=== History ===
A road was built to the crash site, and a memorial was constructed, after Zambia gained its independence in 1964.

The memorial is located 10 km west-north-west of Ndola on the Dag Hammarskjöld memorial access road off the Ndola-Kitwe Dual Carriageway, just south of the Simon Mwansa Kapwepwe International Airport.

Göran Björkdahl interviewed several witnesses around the crash site in the 2000s and studied archival documents related to the Katanga crisis. He wrote in 2011 that he believed Dag Hammarskjöld's death was a murder committed in part to benefit mining companies such as Union Minière.

== World Heritage Status ==
This site was added to the UNESCO World Heritage Tentative List on 11 June 1997 in the Cultural category.
