= Chakravarthi V. Narasimhan =

Indian diplomat (1915–2003)

C.V. Narasimhan
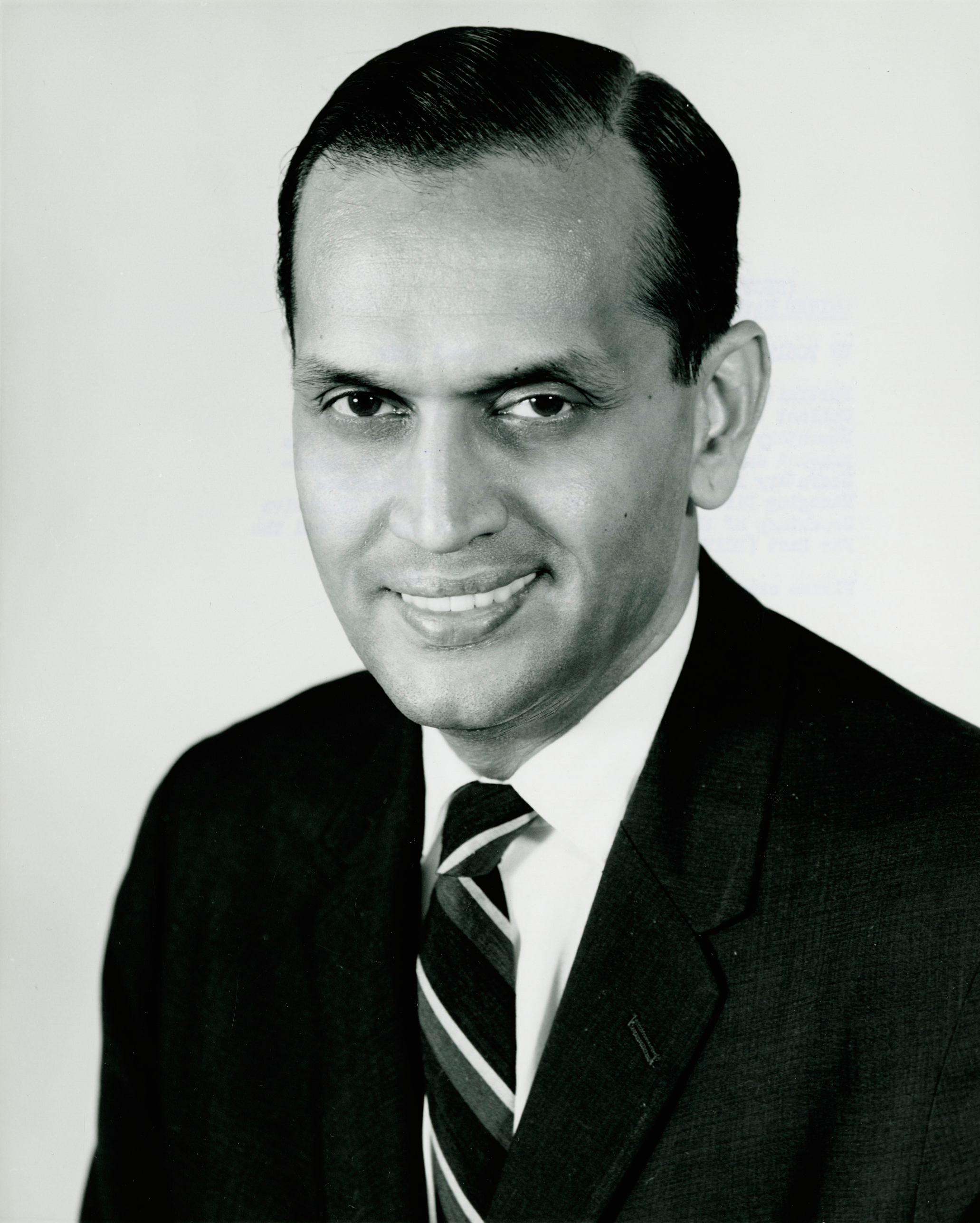
- Official UN portrait, 1962
- Born: Chakravarthi Vijayaraghava Narasimhan; 21 May 1915; Madras, Tamilnadu
- Died: 2 November 2003 (aged 88)
- Occupation: ICS officer

Chakravarthi Vijayaraghava Narasimhan MBE, ICS (21 May 1915 – 2 November 2003) was an Indian Civil Service officer and a former Under Secretary-General of the United Nations, serving twenty-two years in the UN.

Born in Madras, he was educated at St. Joseph's College, Tiruchi, the University of Madras and Oxford University. He entered the Indian Civil Service in September 1937. As a Deputy Secretary in the Development Department of the Madras Government, he was appointed a Member of the Order of the British Empire (MBE) in the 1946 New Year Honours.

He transferred to the service of the new Union Government in 1950, joining the Ministry of Agriculture. In 1953, he joined the Ministry of Finance and headed the Economic Affairs Department, responsible for development and co-ordination of foreign aid programmes. He was appointed to the United Nations in 1956, as Executive Secretary of the U.N. Economic Commission for Asia and Far East. In 1958, he was appointed Under-Secretary for Special Political Questions in the U.N., to work directly under the U.N. Secretary General, Dag Hammarskjöld, and with Nobel laureate Ralph Bunche.

In 1961, he became Chef de Cabinet in the U.N. His last post was as Under Secretary-General before retirement in 1978. In 2001, he received India's second highest honor, the Padma Vibhushan.

A vocalist, scholar and connoisseur of Carnatic music, he also wrote an English translation of the Mahābhārata based on selected verses in 1965. His translation was criticized by James L. Fitzgerald, St. Purander Das Distinguished Professor Emeritus of Classics at Brown University, as being "dry and oversimplified", but praised it as a "useful recapitulation of the bare bones of the story".
