= Chilonga =

- Town
- Location in Zambia
- Coordinates: 12°01′28″S 31°20′11″E
- Country: Zambia
- Province: Muchinga Province
- District: Mpika District
- Elevation: 5,026 ft (1,532 m)

Population (2006 Estimate)
  - Total: 11,816
- Time zone: UTC+2 (CAT)

Chilonga is a town 25 kilometres south-southwest of Mpika in Mpika District in the Muchinga Province of Zambia.

== Location ==
Chilonga is located approximately 25 kilometres (16 mi), by road, southwest of the district headquarters at Mpika. This is about 618 kilometres (384 mi), by road, north-east of Lusaka, the capital and largest city of Zambia. The geographical coordinates of the town are: 12°01'28.0"S, 31°20'11.0"E (Latitude:-12.024444; Longitude:31.336389). The average elevation of Chilonga is about 1,532 metres (5,026 ft), above sea level.

== Overview ==
Chilonga lies on the Great North Road (T2 road; Tanzam Highway), which is the main highway that connects Lusaka, the capital of Zambia, to Kabwe, Kapiri Mposhi, Mpika, Isoka, Nakonde and on to Tunduma and Dar es Salaam, in neighboring Tanzania.

The town is the location of Our Lady's Mission Hospital (Chilonga Mission Hospital), a Level 2 community hospital, with 182 beds, that serves the population of Mpika District, along with the smaller, government-owned, Level 1 Mpika District Hospital, in Mpika. Chilonga Mission Hospital was, as of April 2010, staffed by two doctors, two clinical officers, thirty-four nurses, five paramedics and seventy-two other support staff.

The Catholic Missionary Hospital at Chilonga, is home to the Chilonga School of Nursing and the Chilonga School of Midwifery. The total enrollment in both schools was about 150 students, as of October 2016.

== Population ==
As of February 2006, the population of Chilonga was estimated at 11,816 people.

== See also ==
- TAZARA Railway
- Great North Road
