= Cairo–Cape Town Highway =

Transcontinental road network

Trans-African Highway 4

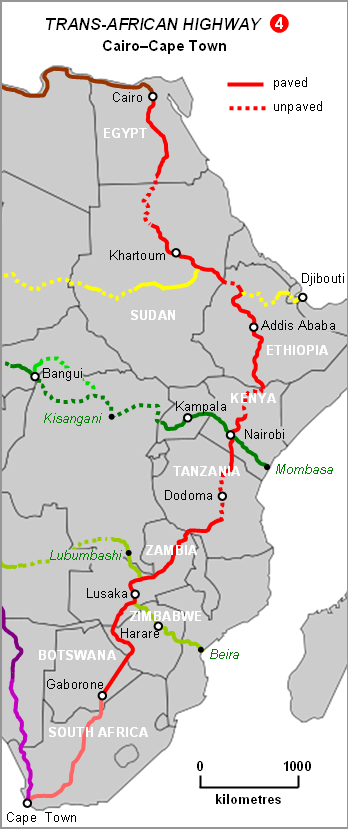

Route information

Major junctions
- North end: TAH 1 in Cairo, Egypt
- TAH 6 in Sudan and Ethiopia; TAH 8 in Nairobi, Kenya; TAH 9 in Zambia
- South end: TAH 3 in Cape Town, South Africa

Location

Highway system
- Transport in
← TAH 3	→ TAH 5

The Cairo–Cape Town Highway is Trans-African Highway 4 in the continental road network developed by the United Nations Economic Commission for Africa (UNECA), the African Development Bank (AfDB), and the African Union. The route has a length of 10,228 km (6,355 mi) and links Cairo in Egypt to Cape Town in South Africa.

The concept originated under the British Empire as part of the proposed Cape to Cairo Road within the Cape to Cairo Red Line of colonial territories. Like the Cape to Cairo Railway, the road was never completed under colonial rule.

== History ==
=== Colonial ===
The original proposal for a North South Red Line route was made in 1874 by Edwin Arnold, the editor of The Daily Telegraph, which was joint sponsor of the expedition by Henry Morton Stanley to Africa to discover the course of the Congo River. The proposed route involved a mixture of railway and river transport between Elizabethville in the Belgian Congo and Sennar in the Sudan rather than a full length rail line.

In comparison, the Red Line road would stretch across the continent from south to north, running through a chain of British-ruled territories, such as the Dominion of the Union of South Africa and the colonies and protectorates of Southern and Northern Rhodesia, Nyasaland, Kenya, Sudan, and Egypt. The road would create cohesion between the British of Africa, it was thought, and give Britain dominant political and economic influence over the continent, securing its position as a global colonial power. The road would also link some of the most important cities of Africa, including Cape Town, Johannesburg, Pretoria, Salisbury, Lusaka, Nairobi, Khartoum and Cairo. The main street through the centre of Lusaka was part of this route and is how it got its name, Cairo Road. One of the main proponents of the route was Cecil John Rhodes, though his preference was for a railway. German East Africa was a gap in the British territories, but Rhodes, in particular, felt that Germany ought to be a natural ally. Shortly before his death he had persuaded the German Kaiser to allow access through his colony for the Cape to Cairo telegraph line (which was built as far north as Ujiji but never completed). In 1918, German East Africa became the Tanganyika Territory administered by the United Kingdom and the gap was thus filled.

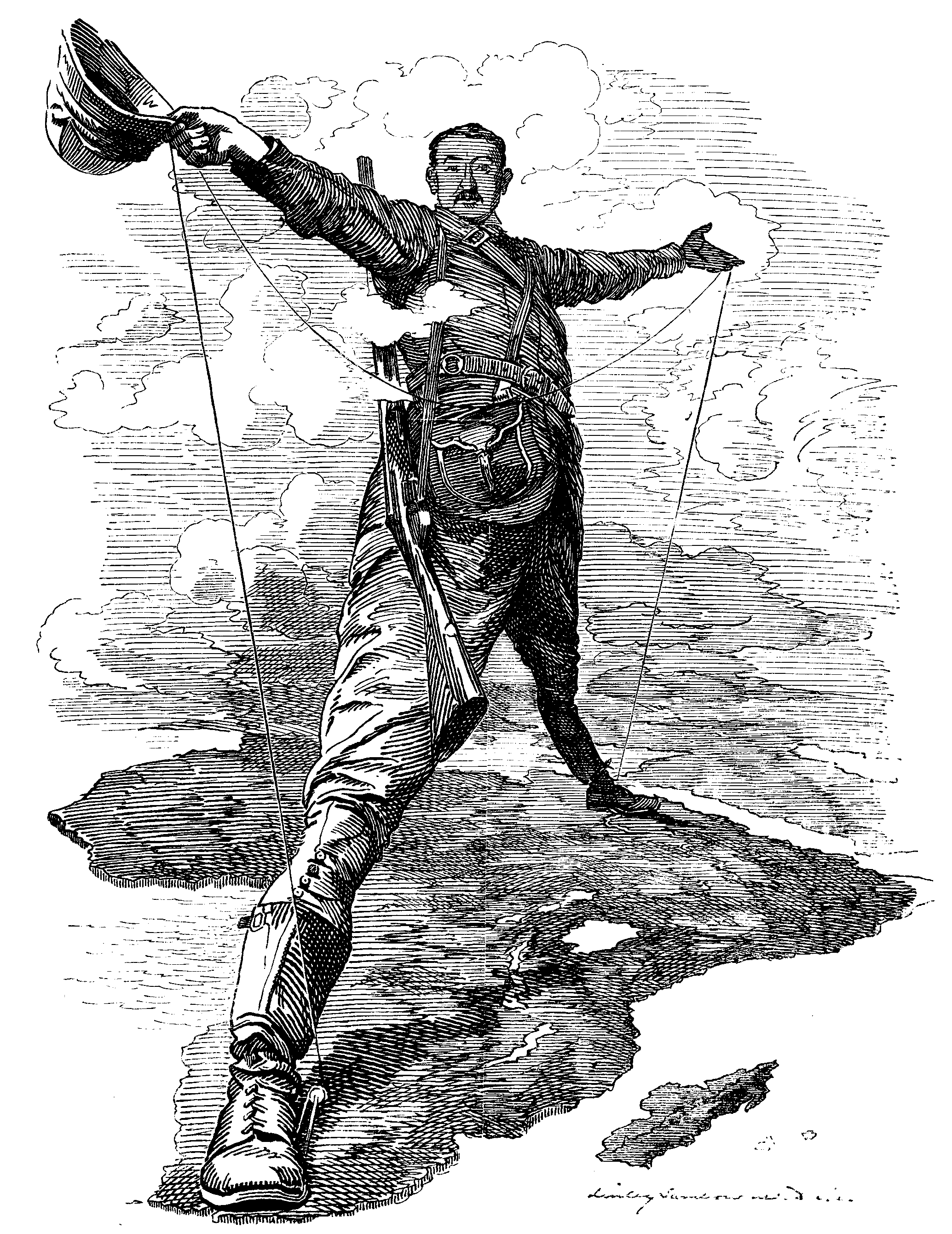
The Rhodes Colossus: Caricature of Cecil Rhodes, after he announced plans for a telegraph line and a railroad from Cape Town to Cairo.

Map showing almost complete British control over the Cape to Cairo route, 1914 British control

France had a rival strategy in the late 1890s to link its colonies from west to east across the continent, Senegal to Djibouti. Sudan and Ethiopia were in the way, but France sent expeditions in 1897 to establish a protectorate in southern Sudan and to find a route across Ethiopia. The scheme foundered when a British flotilla on the Nile confronted the French expedition at the point of intersection between the French and British routes, leading to the Fashoda Incident and eventual diplomatic defeat for France.

Even though Egypt became independent in 1922, British influence was still strong enough for Cairo to be viewed as part of the British sphere of interest, and the idea of a road remained alive. After the Second World War, the British Empire disintegrated; Sudan was the next to become independent in 1956, putting an end to the colonial motivation of the dream.

The first known attempt to drive a vehicle from Cape Town to Cairo was by a Captain Kelsey in 1913–14 but this came to an untimely end when he was killed by a leopard in Rhodesia. The first successful journey was the Court Treatt expedition of 1924 led by Major Chaplin Court Treatt and described by his wife Stella Court Treatt in Cape to Cairo (1927), which drove two Crossley light trucks leaving Cape Town on 23 September 1924 and arriving in Cairo on 24 January 1926.

=== Post-colonial ===
The idea was revived in the 1970s with the launch of the United Nations Economic Commission for Africa Trans-African Highway programme. UNECA first proposed the continental grid of nine road corridors in 1971 as a framework to boost trade and integration after independence.

By the 2010s, most of the Cairo–Cape Town Highway was paved, with a final missing link remaining in central Tanzania. This was resolved with the completion of the 251-kilometre Dodoma–Babati road project, co-financed by the African Development Bank through the African Development Fund, the Japan International Cooperation Agency, and the Government of Tanzania, and constructed by PowerChina as part of a transnational partnership involving China, Japan, Tanzania, and a pan-African institution. The road was inaugurated in April 2018 by Tanzanian President John Magufuli and AfDB President Akinwumi Adesina.

== Route ==
=== Egypt ===
The Cairo–Cape Town Highway begins in Cairo, Egypt, where it meets the eastern end of the Cairo–Dakar Highway (Trans-African Highway 1). It heads south to Aswan and Abu Simbel, where a ferry crossing on Lake Nasser is required to cross the border into Sudan and reach the town of Wadi Halfa.

=== Sudan ===
It then continues south through Dongola and Khartoum to reach the town of Wad Madani, where the N'Djamena–Djibouti Highway (Trans-African Highway 6) joins it south-east. They cross into Ethiopia and reach the town of Wereta east of Lake Tana, where the N'Djamena–Djibouti Highway and the Cairo-Cape Town Highway separate.

=== Ethiopia ===
The Cairo–Cape Town Highway continues south as the A3 road to reach Addis Ababa before continuing south as the A7 road to reach the border with Kenya at Moyale.

=== Kenya ===
It proceeds south as the A2 road from Moyale to the Namanga border with Tanzania.

From Kenol, the road continues as the Thika Superhighway to Nairobi, where it meets the Lagos–Mombasa Highway (Trans-African Highway 8). The TAH 4 and TAH 8 run concurrently as Mombasa Road between Nairobi and Athi River.

=== Tanzania ===
It proceeds as the T2 road to reach the town of Arusha. It then proceeds south as the T5 road through Babati and Dodoma to reach the town of Iringa.

The Cairo-Cape Town Highway proceeds south-west as the Tanzam Highway (T1 road) through Mbeya to cross into Zambia at Tunduma.

=== Zambia ===
It continues south-west as the Tanzam Highway (Great North Road; T2 road) through Nakonde, Mpika and Serenje to reach Kapiri Mposhi, where it joins the Beira–Lobito Highway (Trans-African Highway 9). They proceed south as the T2 road (Great North Road) through Kabwe and Lusaka to reach Kafue, where the Beira–Lobito Highway and the Cairo–Cape Town Highway separate.

The Cairo–Cape Town Highway proceeds south-west through Choma to reach Livingstone (Victoria Falls), where it crosses into Zimbabwe.

=== Zimbabwe ===
It proceeds south-east as the A8 road to pass through Bulawayo before proceeding south-west as the A7 road to cross into Botswana at Plumtree. It proceeds south as the A1 road through Francistown, Palapye and Gaborone to cross into South Africa at Ramatlabama.

=== South Africa ===
It proceeds south as the N18 road through Mahikeng and Vryburg to reach Warrenton. It proceeds south as the N12 road through Kimberley to reach Beaufort West before proceeding south-west as the N1 road to reach Cape Town, where it meets the Tripoli–Cape Town Highway (Trans-African Highway 3) and reaches its end.

== Cape to Cairo Road ==
The Cairo–Cape Town Highway follows much of the route that makes up the original colonial Cape to Cairo Road but it has a few differences:

- The Cape to Cairo Road goes through South Sudan from Kenya while the Cairo–Cape Town Highway passes through Addis Ababa in Ethiopia when heading northwards to Sudan.
- In Tanzania, the Cairo–Cape Town Highway passes as the shorter route through Dodoma and Babati (the T5) while the Cape to Cairo Road first heads eastwards to Chalinze before turning northwards when travelling from Iringa to Arusha.
- The Cairo–Cape Town Highway follows a route through Livingstone (Victoria Falls), Bulawayo, Francistown and Gaborone while the Cape to Cairo Road follows a route through Harare, Pretoria and Johannesburg when travelling from Lusaka to Cape Town.

== Developments ==
=== Kenya ===
In 2026, the Kenya National Highways Authority (KenHA) announced plans to upgrade the 147 km Isiolo Junction-Marua section to dual carriageway standard. The expansion of the Marua-Kenol section to a dual carriageway was nearing completion as of November 2026.

In September 2026, plans were announced to expand the section from Athi River to the Namanga border crossing with Tanzania to a dual carriageway toll road.

== See also ==
- Trans-African Highway network
- Cape to Cairo Railway
