= M1 road (Zambia) =

Road in Zambia

M1 Road

Route information
- Length: 404 km (251 mi)

Major junctions
- South end: T2 (Great North Road) in Mpika
- M3 in Kasama; M2 in Mbala
- North end: T20 at the Mbala Border with Tanzania

Location
- Country: Zambia
- Provinces: Muchinga, Northern
- Major cities: Mpika, Kasama, Mbala

Highway system
- Transport in Zambia
← T6	→ M2

The M1 road is a road in northern Zambia. It connects Mpika in Muchinga Province with Mbala in the Northern Province on the border with Tanzania and the Lake Tanganyika port of Mpulungu via Kasama. The northern section is a toll road (there is a tollgate between Kasama and Mbala).

This stretch of road is commonly known as the Old Great North Road, as the name Great North Road has been given to the T2 road from Mpika to the border with Tanzania after Nakonde, which is part of the Tanzam Highway, Cape to Cairo Road and Cairo-Cape Town Highway (as a result, the T2 is a more recognized route).

== Route ==
The M1 begins in Mpika, Muchinga Province, at a junction with the T2 road (Tanzam Highway; Cape to Cairo Road). It begins by leaving the town in a north-westerly direction and it proceeds northwards, through the villages of Kanchibiya District (Kabuko, Katumba, Kasongo and Mpepo), to cross the Chambeshi River at the Chambeshi Bridge and enter the Northern Province. Just before the Chambeshi Bridge, the M1 meets a road going eastwards providing access to the city of Chinsali (Capital of Muchinga Province). The M1 proceeds northwards to enter the town of Kasama (Capital of Northern Province). The distance from Mpika to Kasama is 214 kilometres.

At a 4-way-junction in Kasama Central, next to the Kasama Golf Club, as the road westwards is the M3 road to the town of Mansa (Capital of the Luapula Province), the M1 becomes the road northwards from this junction by way of a right turn. At the junction with Milungu Road, the M1 meets a road (D18) which provides access to Mungwi District in the east.

The M1 continues northwards for 165 kilometres, through the Kateshi Toll Plaza, through Nseluka and Senga Hill, to the town of Mbala. It reaches a t-junction with the M2 road, which goes to the Lake Tanganyika port of Mpulungu in the west. The M1 turns to the north-east and heads for 26 kilometres to end at a border with Tanzania, where it becomes the T20 road to Sumbawanga in the Rukwa Region.

== Great North Road ==
The M1 road was part of the original Great North Road of Zambia, which ran first as the T2 road from Lusaka (Capital City of Zambia) northwards, continuing by a right turn at Kapiri Mposhi, via a left turn in Mpika to become the M1 road, to Mbala.

But today, The M1 route from Mpika to Mbala is referred to as the Old Great North Road. This is because the continuation of the T2 from Lusaka, passed Mpika, through Nakonde into Tanzania provides easier access to important towns in Tanzania, including Arusha and the Dar es Salaam sea port for trade.

The T2 continuation from Mpika to its end at the Tanzania border after Nakonde is part of the Tanzam Highway (trade route), Cape to Cairo Road (famed road) and Cairo-Cape Town Highway (Trans-African Highway Network no. 4). As a result, it's a more recognized route internationally.

But the M1 is still an important route to the Republic of Zambia, as it is the route transporters from the Mpulungu port at Lake Tanganyika use to access the rest of Zambia, transporting imported goods.

== M2 Road ==
M2 Road

Route information
- Length: 38 km (24 mi)

Major junctions
- South-east end: M1 in Mbala
- North-west end: Mpulungu

Location
- Country: Zambia
- Provinces: Northern
- Major cities: Mbala, Mpulungu

Highway system
- Transport in Zambia
← M1	→ M3

The M2 road is the road which provides access to the town and port of Mpulungu. From the Lake Tanganyika port of Mpulungu, the M2 road goes east-south-east for 38 kilometres to reach its junction with the M1 road in Mbala, next to the Mbala Airport, where it ends.

== See also ==
- Roads in Zambia
