= T2 road (Zambia) =

Road in Zambia

T2 Road

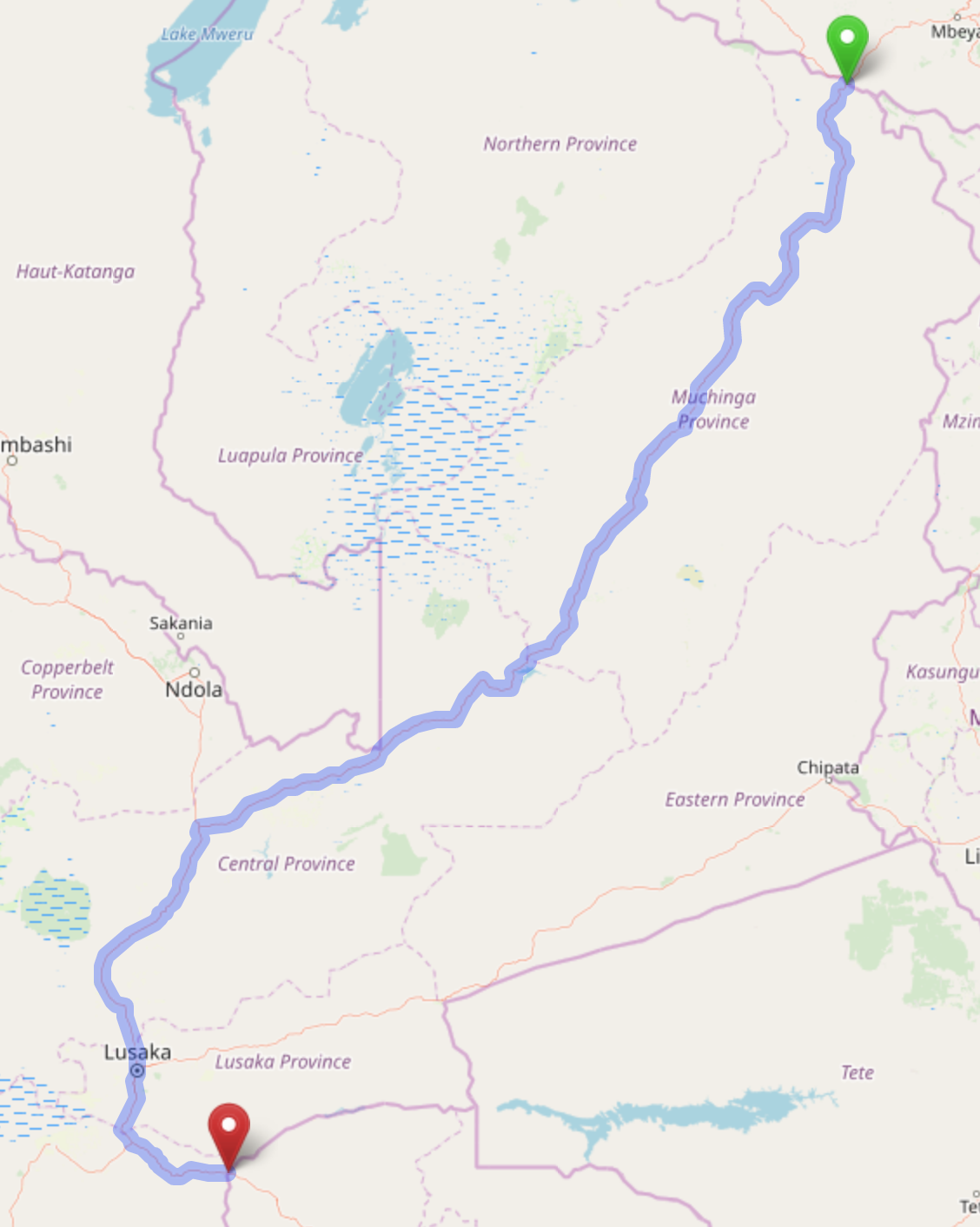
- Route of the T2 through Zambia

Route information
- Length: 1,155 km (718 mi)

Major junctions
- North end: T1 at the Tunduma border with Tanzania
- M14 in Nakonde; M1 in Mpika; T3 near Kapiri Mposhi; M20 near Chibombo; T4 / M9 in Lusaka; T1 near Kafue; M15 near Chirundu
- South end: A1 A1 at the Chirundu border with Zimbabwe

Location
- Country: Zambia
- Provinces: Muchinga, Central, Lusaka, Southern
- Major cities: Mpika, Kabwe, Lusaka, Kafue

Highway system
- Transport in Zambia
← T1	→ T3

The T2 is a trunk road in Zambia. The road runs from the Tunduma border with Tanzania via Mpika, Kabwe and Lusaka to the Chirundu border with Zimbabwe. The road is the longest route of the country, as it is approximately 1,155 kilometres (718 mi). The route from Nakonde to Kafue is a toll road. The route from Tanzania to Lusaka is Zambia's Great North Road and is part of the Tanzam Highway.

For its entire route, the T2 is part of the Cape to Cairo Road. Also, the section from the T3 road junction in Kapiri Mposhi to the T1 road junction just after Kafue is part of the Walvis Bay-Ndola-Lubumbashi Development Road.

== Route ==
Much of the route forms Zambia's Great North Road and the entire route is part of the famed Cape to Cairo Road.

=== Muchinga Province ===
The T2 road begins from Zambia's border post with Tanzania near Tunduma as the Tanzam Highway and Great North Road. On the Tanzanian side, it is the T1 road to Iringa and Dar es Salaam. It starts by meeting the northern terminus of the M14 road (which connects to the Mafinga Hills) before passing south-west through the town centre of Nakonde.

From Nakonde, the T2 goes southwards for 86 km (53 mi) to the town of Isoka. From Isoka, the road goes south-west for 263 km (163 mi), bypassing Chinsali (Muchinga Province's Capital), through Shiwang'andu District (where it bypasses Lake Ishiba Ng'andu and the Shiwa Ngandu Estate), to the town of Mpika, where it meets the southern terminus of the M1 road from Kasama and Mbala. The name Great North Road used to apply to the M1 road up to the Mbala Border with Tanzania, but the name has since been given to the T2 road to Nakonde, due to its direct route to important towns in Tanzania.

=== Central Province ===
From Mpika, the T2 road makes a 245 km (152 mi) journey south-south-west, through the Chilonga Toll Plaza, through Lavushimanda District, crossing into Central Province and passing through Chitambo District, to Serenje. 40 km (25 mi) before Serenje, at the town of Chitambo, the T2 meets a direct road to Luapula Province, named the Serenje-Samfya Road (opened in 1983; designated as the D235 on the Zambian road network), which is used by motorists to access Luapula Province quickly.

From Serenje, the T2 makes a 200 km (120 mi) journey west-south-west, through the farming town of Mkushi, through the George Kunda SC Toll Plaza, to Kapiri Mposhi. From the border post with Tanzania at Nakonde, the T2 is accompanied to Kapiri Mposhi by a railway named the Tanzania-Zambia Railway (TAZARA Railway) (parallel from Mpika).

At Kapiri Mposhi, the T2 road meets the southern terminus of the T3 road from Ndola and Kitwe in the Copperbelt Province and the Kasumbalesa border with DR Congo in the north. They meet at a T-junction. As the T3 road ends at this junction, the T2 route becomes the road southwards to pass through Kapiri Mposhi's town centre.

From Kapiri Mposhi, the road goes for 60 km (37 mi) south-south-west, through the Manyumbi Toll Plaza, bypassing the Mulungushi Rock of Authority, to the town of Kabwe, which is the seat of Central Province. From Kabwe, the road goes 55 km (34 mi) south-west to the town of Chibombo.

20 km (12 mi) south of Chibombo, at the junction with the M20 road to Mumbwa (this junction is famously known as Landless Corner), the T2 road turns south-east and enters the western part of Chisamba District for a few kilometres (bypassing the farming town of Chisamba to the west; where the D176 provides access to the Chisamba Town Centre), before turning directly south towards Lusaka and passing through the Katuba Toll Plaza, where it re-enters Chibombo District (passing through the Katuba constituency).

=== Lusaka Province ===
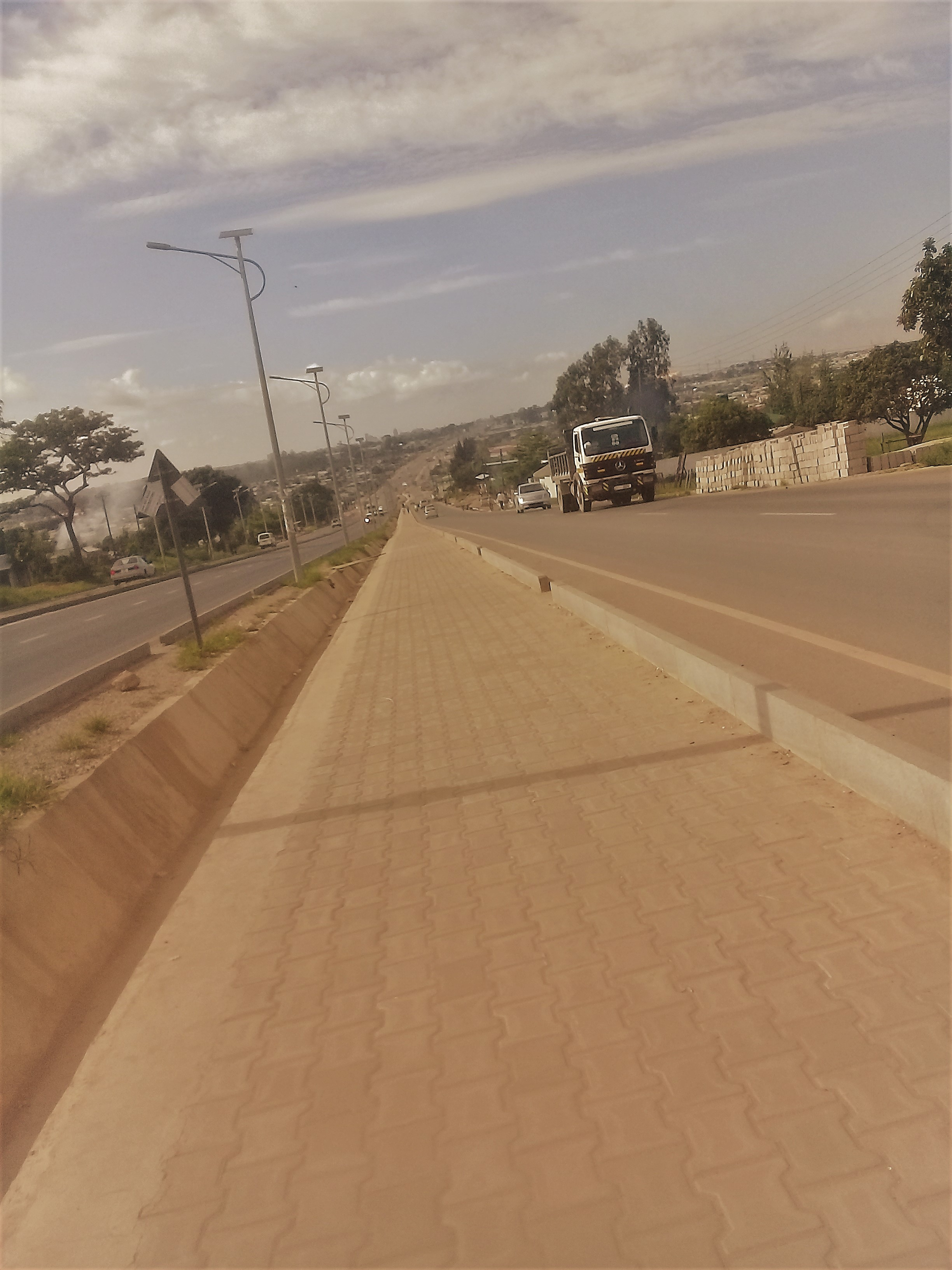
Great North Road across Zanimouone north of Lusaka

Next, the T2 leaves Chibombo District, Central Province and enters Lusaka, Zambia's capital city, in the Lusaka Province. It enters just before the National Heroes Stadium (at the suburb of Kabangwe). At the roundabout at the northern end of the city centre (Kabwe Roundabout), the T2 route meets the western terminus of the T4 road (Great East Road) from Chongwe and Chipata (and the republics of Malawi & Mozambique) and the eastern terminus of the M9 road from Mumbwa and Mongu. This roundabout junction with the T4 and M9 marks the end of the T2 being known as the Tanzam Highway and the Great North Road.

Right after this roundabout, the T2 becomes Cairo Road, an avenue with many trees and businesses on the road and where heavy vehicles are not permitted to pass. (Trucks are advised to use Lumumba Road to bypass the city centre to the west and come back on the T2 south of the city Centre)

At the southern end of the city centre, the T2 has a roundabout again (Kafue Roundabout), where it meets Lusaka's Independence Avenue and becomes Kafue Road. At the next junction, the southern end of Lumumba Road is met. This is where heavy vehicles going northwards are advised to join Lumumba Road to skip the city centre and bypass it to the west. This is also where heavy vehicles going southwards rejoin the main road.

Going south of Lusaka, the road is named Kafue Road. It goes for 45 km (28 mi), through the town of Chilanga and the Shimabala Toll Plaza, to reach the industrial town of Kafue. Approximately 10 km (6.2 mi) after the Kafue town centre, the T2 route crosses the Kafue River as the Kafue Bridge into Southern Province, entering Chikankata District.

=== Southern Province ===
In Chikankata District (just after the Kafue River crossing), at a T-junction known as Turnpike, the T2 meets the north-eastern terminus of the Lusaka–Livingstone Road (T1 road) from Mazabuka, Choma, Livingstone and the Victoria Falls (with links to Botswana, Namibia and north-western Zimbabwe).

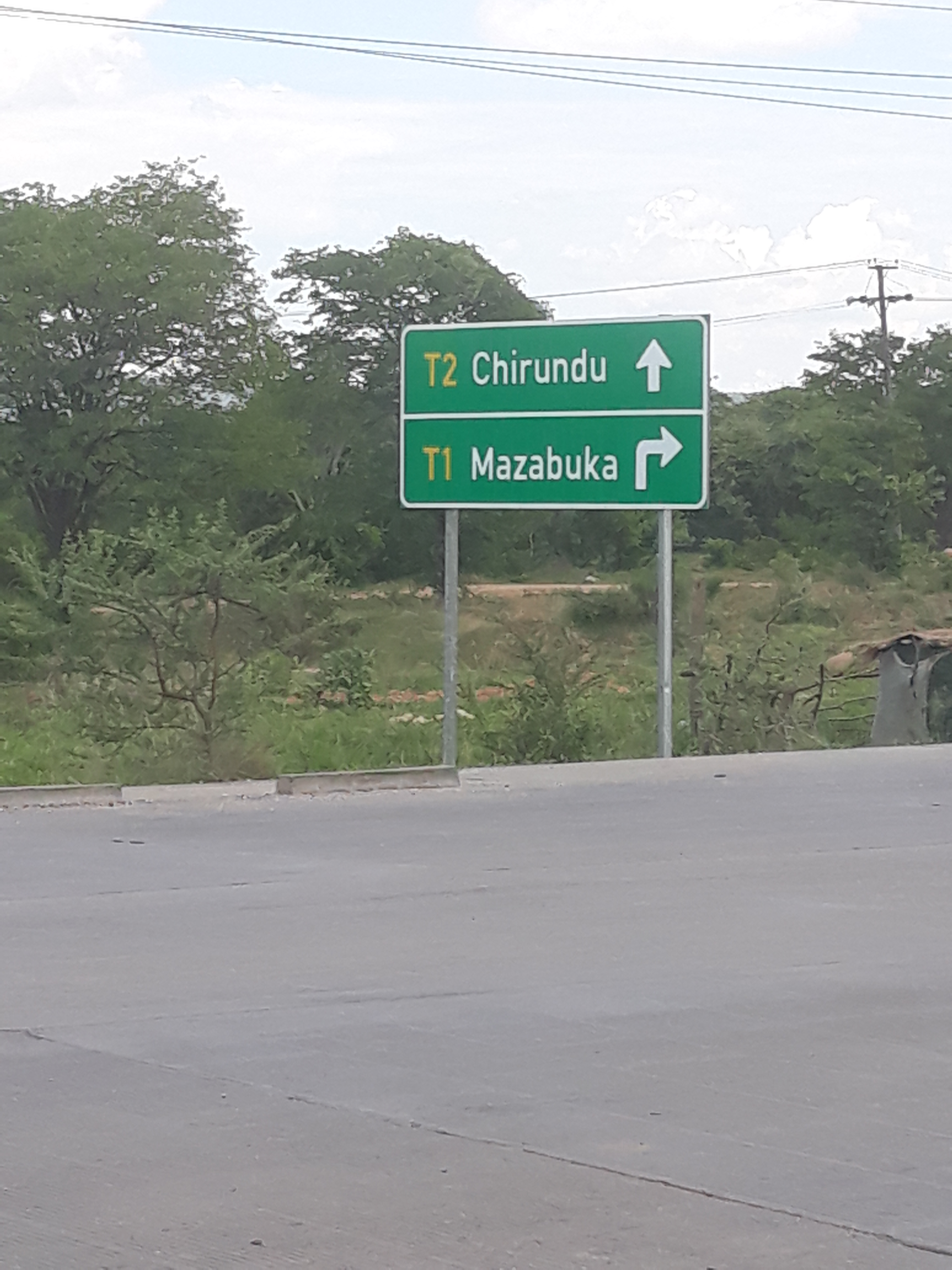
A road sign at the T2 & T1 junction in Chikankata District, Southern Province, Zambia (December 2022)

From the Livingstone Road (T1) junction, the T2 goes east-south-east for 79 km (49 mi), following the Kafue River, to pass through a mountainous area and reach the town of Chirundu on the border with Zimbabwe (Zambezi River), where there is a bridge (Chirundu Bridge; built in 1939) to connect with the A1 road (R3 road) on the Zimbabwean side going to Harare. The village on the other side of the border is also named Chirundu.

Seventeen km (11 mi) before Chirundu, the T2 meets the northern terminus of the M15 road, which is the road that provides access to the tourist town of Siavonga on the Zambezi River adjacent to the Kariba Dam and a border connecting to the town of Kariba on the Zimbabwean side.

As the Cape to Cairo Road, The T2 becomes the Chirundu–Beitbridge Regional Road Corridor in Zimbabwe, which connects to South Africa.

== Road Network ==
The T2 between the Tanzania border and the T1 road junction south of Kafue is part of Trans-African Highway 4 (Cairo-Cape Town Highway), which connects Cairo in Egypt with Cape Town in South Africa. (the Cairo-Cape Town Highway continues from Kafue south-westwards as the T1 road)

The T2 between the T3 road junction in Kapiri Mposhi and the Zimbabwe border is part of Trans-African Highway 9 (Beira-Lobito Highway), which connects Beira in Mozambique with Lobito in Angola. (The Beira-Lobito Highway continues from Kapiri Mposhi northwards as the T3 road)

The T2 from its junction with the T3 road in Kapiri Mposhi to its junction with the T1 road south of Kafue is part of the Walvis Bay-Ndola-Lubumbashi Development Road.

The T2 from the Tanzania Border to the Cairo Road/Great East Road junction in Lusaka is part of the Tanzam Highway and is known as Zambia's Great North Road.

== Great North Road ==
In the past, the M1 road from Mpika northwards, through Kasama, to Mbala and Mpulungu was known as Zambia's Great North Road. Then, the name Great North Road was given to the T2 road from Mpika north-east to the Tanzania Border at Nakonde, probably due to the fact that it is part of the Cape to Cairo Road. So, the M1 road is now referred to as the Old Great North Road.

The road connecting Lusaka and Livingstone (which was the capital of the nation before 1935) was originally regarded as being part of the Great North Road of Zambia. Then, after the capital of the nation became Lusaka in 1935, Lusaka was regarded as the southern terminus of the Great North Road and the road connecting Lusaka to Livingstone was no-longer regarded as part of the route.

The section from Mpika to Lusaka remains part of the Great North Road & so, Zambia's Great North Road is currently the section of the T2 road from the Tanzania Border at Nakonde to Lusaka.

== Lusaka West Ring Road ==
A new bypass road was constructed in Lusaka, named the Lusaka West Ring Road, as part of the Lusaka Decongestion Project (LDP). It was constructed in order for north-south traffic that has no need of stopping in Lusaka to bypass the city centre, which is a busy commercial area, to the west. It was opened in 2020.

It starts in Kabangwe, approximately 13 kilometres north of the Lusaka Central Business District, at a junction with the T2 road (Great North Road). It passes through Lusaka West, meeting Mungwi Road, Mumbwa Road, Los Angeles Road and Makeni Road, before rejoining the T2 (Kafue Road) south of the suburb of Makeni, approximately 8 kilometres south of the Lusaka Central Business District.

The Lusaka West Ring Road eases traffic that occurs in the roads of Lusaka's central area, primarily Cairo Road and Lumumba Road, which are the main thoroughfares used to go from the southern side of the CBD to the northern side of the CBD and vice versa.

== M15 Road (Zambia) ==
M15 Road

Route information
- Length: 65 km (40 mi)

Major junctions
- North end: T2 near Chirundu
- South end: P12 P12 at Kariba border with Zimbabwe

Location
- Country: Zambia
- Provinces: Southern
- Major cities: Siavonga

Highway system
- Transport in Zambia
← M14	→ M16

The M15 road is the 65 km (40 mi) road in Southern Province connecting the tourist town of Siavonga with Chirundu. Together with the T2 road, it is the main route connecting Siavonga with the rest of the country.

It begins 18 km (11 mi) west of Chirundu at a junction with the T2 road and goes southwards for 65 km (40 mi) to Siavonga. It bypasses Siavonga town centre to the east and becomes the eastern wall of the Kariba Dam, where it crosses the Zambezi River borderline into the republic of Zimbabwe and becomes the P12 road to pass through the town of Kariba on the Zimbabwean side.

== Lusaka-Ndola Dual Carriageway ==
On 8 September 2017, President Edgar Lungu commissioned the construction of the Lusaka-Ndola Dual Carriageway. This proposed route construction would transform the T2 road (Great North Road) from Lusaka to Kapiri Mposhi, together with the T3 road from Kapiri Mposhi to Ndola (a total distance of 320 kilometres), into a dual carriageway with 2 lanes in each direction to ease the movement of vehicles such as trucks, buses and motor vehicles and reduce on accidents.

This new dual carriageway would require bypasses around the towns of Kabwe and Kapiri Mposhi together with some grade-separated interchanges where necessary. Together with the already-existing Ndola-Kitwe Dual Carriageway and Kitwe-Chingola Dual Carriageway in the Copperbelt Province, this proposed road would provide a faster and safer journey from Lusaka to DR Congo.

The total cost of this 320 km road, after several increments, was finalized at $1.2 billion and construction began from Lusaka going northwards. Certain elements of society criticized the high cost of the road, as it would cost just over $3.7 million per kilometre. The deal was made with the China Jiangxi Corporation for International Economic and Technical Cooperation (CJIC) to construct the road.

However, only the section of the T2 (Great North Road) within the capital city (Lusaka District), up to the Six Miles Roundabout, was completed by June 2021, with the Ministry of Finance ordering for the Road Development Agency to halt the project, citing financial constraints.

In November 2021 (just after Zambia's Presidential election), the newly-appointed Infrastructure, Housing and Urban Development Minister, Charles Milupi, stated that the road would cost less than $1.2 billion under President Hakainde Hichilema's government. Road construction would only resume once the price has been renegotiated to a lower amount; otherwise, the project was not cancelled.

So, the newly-formed government officially cancelled the deal that the previous government made with the China Jiangxi Corporation for International Economic and Technical Cooperation (CJIC), citing that the project was overpriced.

In early 2022, Hon Charles Milupi stated that completing this dual carriageway was of high importance. He stated that they would resume works on that road at a reduced cost after the rain season would pass in Zambia. Then, the Minister of Finance, Situmbeko Musokotwane, stated that this project (Lusaka-Ndola Dual Carriageway) would be financed by a "public-private partnership" (PPP).

On 28 February 2023, the Minister of Finance, Situmbeko Musokotwane, together with other ministers, re-commissioned the construction of the Lusaka-Ndola Dual Carriageway at Protea Hotel in Ndola. The project was initially expected to cost $577 million and is being financed by a public-private partnership (concession). The consortium responsible for the construction and maintenance of the road is Macro-Ocean Investment Consortium. The road being transformed into a dual carriageway is from the Cairo Road/Great East Road roundabout (Kabwe Roundabout) in Lusaka to the Ndola Central Hospital roundabout (327 kilometres), with the project resuming from Six Miles Roundabout, where the previous contractor ended. It was expected to take 3 years to completion and the concession agreement is for another 22 years (up to 2048).

On 26 March 2024 at a contract signing, the National Pension Scheme Authority (NAPSA) stated that the Lusaka-Ndola Dual Carriageway project is expected to cost $650 million and that it would be completed in 36 months. NAPSA lent $300 million in funding to Macro-Ocean Investment Consortium for the project, while the Workers Compensation Fund Control Board (WCFCB) also lent $50 million in funding for the project. President Hakainde Hichilema officiated at the ground-breaking ceremony for the project in Kapiri Mposhi on 21 May 2024.

In June 2024, it was reported that roadworks were happening concurrently on four different stretches (divided into four lots), namely between Lusaka and Chibombo (90 kilometres), between Chibombo and Kapiri Mposhi (115 kilometres), between Kapiri Mposhi and Ndola (115 kilometres), and on the M6 road between Masangano and Luanshya via Fisenge (45 kilometres).

On 7 October 2024, the National Road Fund Agency (NRFA) stated that the three already-existing toll gates on the 320-kilometre stretch between Lusaka and Ndola (Katuba; Manyumbi; Kafulafuta) will be handed over to the concessionaire (Macro Ocean Investment Consortium) on 30 November 2024. They stated that any toll fees collected at the three toll gates will be directed to an Escrow account that will be controlled by both the concessionaire and the government until the project is complete in 2026, when the concessionaire will take over full operations of maintaining the road and collecting tolls. They stated that an additional toll gate will be added on the T2 in-between Chibombo and Kabwe while a toll gate will also be placed on the M6 road (Masangano-Fisenge road; the road used to bypass Ndola on the way to Luanshya and Kitwe). The Road Development Agency board chairperson reported on 24 November 2025 that almost 60% of the project is complete.

On 13 May 2026, the toll gate on the T2 in-between Chibombo and Kabwe was commissioned by Charles Milupi (the Minister of Infrastructure, Housing and Urban Development) and it was named the Anderson Kambela Mazoka Toll Plaza, named after the late politician who was once a manager at Zambia Railways and founded the UPND political party. At the same commissioning event, it was announced that the toll gate in-between Kabwe and Kapiri Mposhi, which had been named the Manyumbi Toll Plaza since it was opened in November 2019, would be renamed as the Godfrey Ucar Chitalu Toll Plaza, named after a late football player and coach.

It was reported on 21 June 2026 that 78% of the project has been completed, with the Kapiri Mposhi Bypass (18 km) being opened to traffic. It was reported in September 2026 that the Kabwe Bypass (23 km) was opened to traffic.

In mid-November 2026, it was reported by the Road Development Agency and the Minister of Infrastructure and Urban Development (Collins Nzovu) that the Lusaka-Ndola Dual Carriageway project is 90% complete.

== See also ==
- Great North Road, Zambia
- Transport in Zambia
- Roads in Zambia
