= Serenje =

- Town
- Location in Zambia
- Coordinates: 13°15′35″S 30°14′15″E
- Country: Zambia
- Province: Central Province
- District: Serenje District
- Time zone: UTC+2 (CAT)

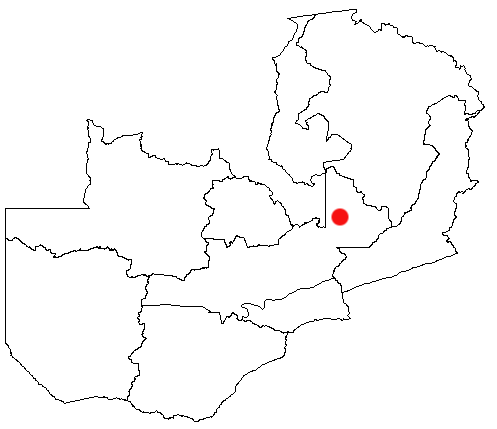
Location of Serenje in Zambia

Serenje is a town in Serenje District, Central Province, Zambia, lying just off the Great North Road and TAZARA Railway. Serenje has a railway station on the TAZARA railway. Serenje is approximately 197 km from Kapiri Mposhi on the Great North Road. The Mulembo Falls lie near the town.

== Economy ==
The inhabitants of Serenje district engage in subsistence agriculture. Though the area has rich soils and thick forests, economic development appears to have eluded this Zambian rural outpost.

== Society ==
Serenje is home to the Lala people whose primary language is ciLala. The Lala language, like most languages spoken on the Copperbelt and Central provinces of Zambia, is classified as belonging to the Bemba language group. The Lala people, like most ethnic groups in central and northern and northwestern parts of Zambia, are said to have descended from the Luba-Lunda Kingdom in present-day Congo DRC. Serenje district is constituted by a number of Chiefdoms. These are the chiefdoms of Muchinda, Muchinka, Chisomo, Serenje, Kabamba, Mailo, and Chibale.

== Transport ==
=== Road ===
The T2 road, also known as the Great North Road and the Tanzam Highway, connects north-east to Chitambo, Mpika and the border with Tanzania at Nakonde and south-west to Mkushi, Kapiri Mposhi, Kabwe and Lusaka.

=== Rail ===
Serenje is on the TAZARA Railway, which connects west-southwest to Kapiri Mposhi and north-east to Mpika, Kasama and the border with Tanzania at Nakonde. In 2015, it was proposed for the railway entering Zambia from Malawi (which currently ends at Chipata) to be extended through Petauke to Serenje, where it would form a junction with the TAZARA.

== Climate ==
Serenje features a humid subtropical climate (Köppen: Cwa) with distinct wet and dry seasons. October and November are the hottest months. Winters are milder, with July being the coolest month. The wet season, from November to March, experiences significant rainfall. The dry season, from May to October, is marked by minimal precipitation.

Climate data for Serenje (1991–2020)
Month	Jan	Feb	Mar	Apr	May	Jun	Jul	Aug	Sep	Oct	Nov	Dec	Year
Record high °C (°F)	32.0 (89.6)	32.0 (89.6)	33.1 (91.6)	36.0 (96.8)	33.0 (91.4)	30.9 (87.6)	30.7 (87.3)	33.2 (91.8)	35.9 (96.6)	36.6 (97.9)	36.3 (97.3)	34.1 (93.4)	33.7 (92.7)
Mean daily maximum °C (°F)	26.6 (79.9)	27.1 (80.8)	27.3 (81.1)	26.7 (80.1)	26.0 (78.8)	24.1 (75.4)	23.7 (74.7)	26.2 (79.2)	29.5 (85.1)	31.4 (88.5)	30.3 (86.5)	27.7 (81.9)	27.2 (81.0)
Daily mean °C (°F)	21.8 (71.2)	21.9 (71.4)	21.9 (71.4)	20.8 (69.4)	19.3 (66.7)	17.3 (63.1)	16.8 (62.2)	18.9 (66.0)	22.0 (71.6)	24.2 (75.6)	24.0 (75.2)	22.4 (72.3)	20.9 (69.6)
Mean daily minimum °C (°F)	16.9 (62.4)	16.7 (62.1)	16.4 (61.5)	14.9 (58.8)	12.6 (54.7)	10.5 (50.9)	9.8 (49.6)	11.6 (52.9)	14.5 (58.1)	17.0 (62.6)	17.6 (63.7)	17.1 (62.8)	14.6 (58.3)
Record low °C (°F)	12.5 (54.5)	11.4 (52.5)	8.5 (47.3)	7.0 (44.6)	4.0 (39.2)	2.5 (36.5)	2.0 (35.6)	2.9 (37.2)	7.8 (46.0)	9.6 (49.3)	11.7 (53.1)	11.8 (53.2)	7.6 (45.7)
Average precipitation mm (inches)	245.3 (9.66)	213.2 (8.39)	165.1 (6.50)	29.4 (1.16)	1.6 (0.06)	0.0 (0.0)	0.4 (0.02)	0.0 (0.0)	1.2 (0.05)	11.4 (0.45)	81.9 (3.22)	204.2 (8.04)	953.5 (37.54)
Source: NOAA

== Personalities ==
- Emeli Sandé's father went to Kabamba Primary School in Serenje.

== See also ==
- Railway stations in Zambia
