= Nseluka =

Coordinates: 09°58′S 31°16′E

Nseluka is a small town in northern Zambia. It is on the M1 road, which heads to Kasama in the south and Mbala/Mpulungu in the north.

== Statistics ==
- elevation – 1,355 metres (4,446 ft)

== Transport ==
It has a station on the TAZARA railway. It is the proposed junction for a branch railway to Mpulungu on the shores of Lake Tanganyika.

== See also ==
- Transport in Zambia
