= Muchinga Province =

Province of Zambia

Coordinates: 10°00′S 32°00′E

Muchinga
- Province
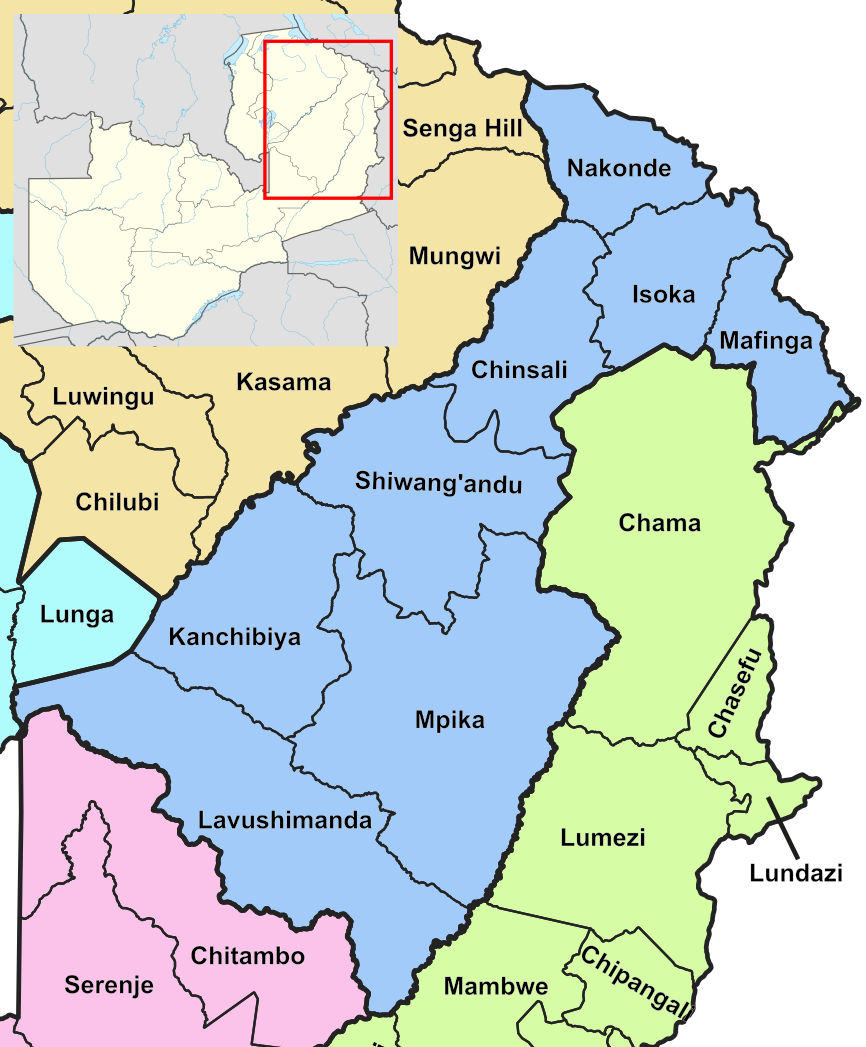
- Map of Zambia showing the Muchinga Province
- Country: Zambia
- Capital: Chinsali

Government
  - Type: Provincial Administration
  - Provincial Minister: Njavwa Simutowe (UPND)

Area
  - Total: 87,806 km^{2} (33,902 sq mi)

Population (2022 census)
  - Total: 922,212
  - Density: 10.503/km^{2} (27.202/sq mi)
- Districts: 7
- Website: www.muc.gov.zm

Muchinga Province is one of the ten provinces of Zambia. It is located in the northeast of the country and borders with Tanzania in the north, Malawi in the east, Eastern Province in the south, Central Province in the southwest, Luapula Province in the west, and Northern Province in the northwest. The administrative center of the province is Chinsali.

The name of the province originates from the Muchinga Escarpment, on which it predominantly sits.

== Geography ==
The province is elongated from southwest to northeast and is located on both sides of the Muchinga Mountains (Muchinga Escarpment), which serve as a divide between the drainage basins of the Zambezi River (Indian Ocean) and the Congo River (Atlantic Ocean). The main rivers of the province are the Luangwa River, a major left tributary of the Zambezi, and the Chambeshi River, a tributary of Lake Bangweulu, in the drainage basin of the Congo. The source of the Luangwa is located in the province.

Three national parks are located in the province. There are Lavushi Manda National Park, North Luangwa National Park, and South Luangwa National Park. The latter is shared with Eastern and Central Provinces.

== History ==
The creation of a province was announced by President Michael Sata in October 2011. In November 2011, the president appointed Sichone Malozo as the first Muchinga Province Minister. The parliament approved the creation of the province at some later date.

The province consisted originally of five districts. Chama District was transferred from the Eastern Province, and the Chinsali, Isoka, Mpika, and Nakonde districts were transferred from the Northern Province. In 2013, Mafinga District was created by splitting Isoka District and Shiwang'andu District was created by splitting Chinsali District, bringing the total number of districts to seven.

In 2017, President Edgar Lungu announced the creation of two districts, which were created by splitting Mpika District into three (north, east and south-west). With Mpika in the east, the two new districts are named Kanchibiya District (north of Mpika) and Lavushimanda District (south-west of Mpika; named after the Lavushi Manda National Park), bringing the total number of districts to nine.

On 17 November 2021, President Hakainde Hichilema officially declared Chama District as part of Eastern Province (no-longer part of Muchinga Province), thereby returning the district to its original province. So, Muchinga Province only has land that was previously part of the Northern Province and currently has 8 districts.

== Demographics ==
Historical population
Year	Pop.	±%
2000	566,266	—
2010	711,657	+25.7%
2022	922,212	+29.6%

As per the 2010 Zambian census, Muchinga Province had a population of 711,657 accounting to 5.42% of the total Zambian population of 1,3,092,666. There were 349,872 males and 361,785 females, making the sex ratio to 1,034 for every 1,000 males, compared to the national average of 1,028. The literacy rate stood at 63.50% against a national average of 70.2%. The rural population constituted 82.99%, while the urban population was 17.01%. The total area of the province was 87,806 km^{2} and the population density was 8.10 per km^{2}. The population density during 2000 Zambian census stood at 8.10. The decadal population growth of the province was 3.10%. The median age in the province at the time of marriage was 20.1. The average household size was 5.1, with the families headed by females being 4.1 and 5.4 for families headed by men. The total eligible voters in the province was 63.80%. The unemployment rate of the province was 6.40%. The total fertility rate was 7.0, complete birth rate was 6.4, crude birth rate was 40.0, child women population at birth was 854, general fertility rate was 175, gross reproduction rate was 2.8 and net reproduction rate was 2.1. The total labour force constituted 61.90% of the total population. Out of the labour force, 67.9% were men and 56.3% women. The annual growth rate of labour force was 3.6%. Bemba was the most spoken language with 46.90% speaking it. The total population of persons with Albinism in the province stood at 1,634. The life expectancy at birth stood at 53 compared to the national average of 51.

== Administration ==
Muchinga is a province formed after 2000 from the existing provinces. Provincial administration is set up purely for administrative purposes. The province is headed by a minister appointed by the President and there are ministries of central government for each province. The administrative head of the province is the Permanent Secretary, appointed by the President. There is a Deputy Permanent Secretary, heads of government departments and civil servants at the provincial level. Muchinga Province is divided into eight districts, namely Chinsali District, Isoka District, Mafinga District, Mpika District, Nakonde District, Shiwang'andu District, Kanchibiya District and Lavushimanda District. All the district headquarters are the same as the district names (except for Mafinga and Kanchibiya). There are eight councils in the province, each of which is headed by an elected representative, called councilor. Each councilor holds office for three years. The administrative staff of the council is selected based on Local Government Service Commission from within or outside the district. The office of the provincial government is located in each of the district headquarters and has provincial local government officers and auditors. Each council is responsible for raising and collecting local taxes and the budgets of the council are audited and submitted every year after the annual budget. The elected members of the council do not draw salaries, but are paid allowances from the council. Muchinga is a predominantly rural district and hence there are no city or municipal councils. The government stipulates 63 different functions for the councils with the majority of them being infrastructure management and local administration. Councils are mandated to maintain each of their community centres, zoos, local parks, drainage system, playgrounds, cemeteries, caravan sites, libraries, museums and art galleries. They also work along with specific government departments for helping in agriculture, conservation of natural resources, postal service, establishing and maintaining hospitals, schools and colleges. The councils prepare schemes that encourage community participation.

== Transportation ==
The TAZARA Railway, which connects Kapiri Mposhi with Tanzania crosses the province from southwest to northeast.

A road connecting Kapiri Mposhi and eventually Lusaka with Tanzania (the Tanzam Highway; the T2 route) runs through the province, passing Mpika and Isoka (and bypassing Chinsali) (this road is also known as the Great North Road). In Mpika, another major road branches north to Kasama and Lake Tanganyika (the M1 route).

== See also ==
- Bibliography of the history of Zambia
