= Mpika railway station =

Railway station in Zambia

Coordinates: 11°50′51″S 31°23′29″E

Mpika is a major intermediate railway station on the TAZARA Railway in northern Zambia. Located in the town of Mpika, it has a passenger station, and many goods sidings.

Preceding station	TAZARA Railway	Following station
Chilonga towards New Kapiri Mposhi	TAZARA Railway	Sabwa towards Dar es Salaam, Tanzania

== Description ==
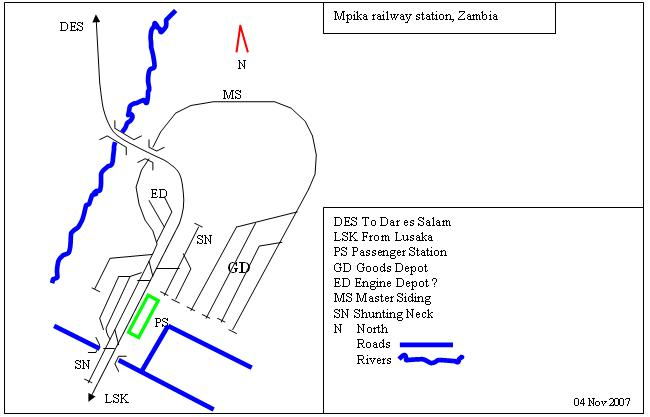
Mpika railway station in Zambia

At the centre of Mpika railway station is a crossing loop and several parallel sidings mainly used for shunting. The passenger station with a grand entrance is located at this point with a prominent road opposite.

Two shunting necks connect North and South of the station, the northern shunting neck merging with the Master Siding. Level crossing(s) that may have existed in the past have been replaced by underbridge(s).

Sidings where freight may be loaded and unloaded existing in several places. These are concentrated to the north east of the station in a complex of several sidings, which connect to the station via a 180 degree master siding. This master siding dives under the main line for two reasons, firstly to avoid sharper curves, and secondly to connect with the crossing loop rather than the passenger platform. The goods depot is very close to the passenger station which helps supervision.

There appears to be an engine depot with a number of sidings connecting to the master siding to the north west.

== Timeline ==
=== 2012 ===
- Some slow progress on the Chipata link.

=== 2007 ===
- October 2007 - proposed link to Malawi via Chipata would junction off TAZARA Railway at Mpika.
