= Luangwa National Park =

Luangwa National Park can refer to either of two parks in Zambia:

- North Luangwa National Park
- South Luangwa National Park
