= Cairo Road =

Road in Lusaka, Zambia

Coordinates: 15.41661°S 28.28168°E

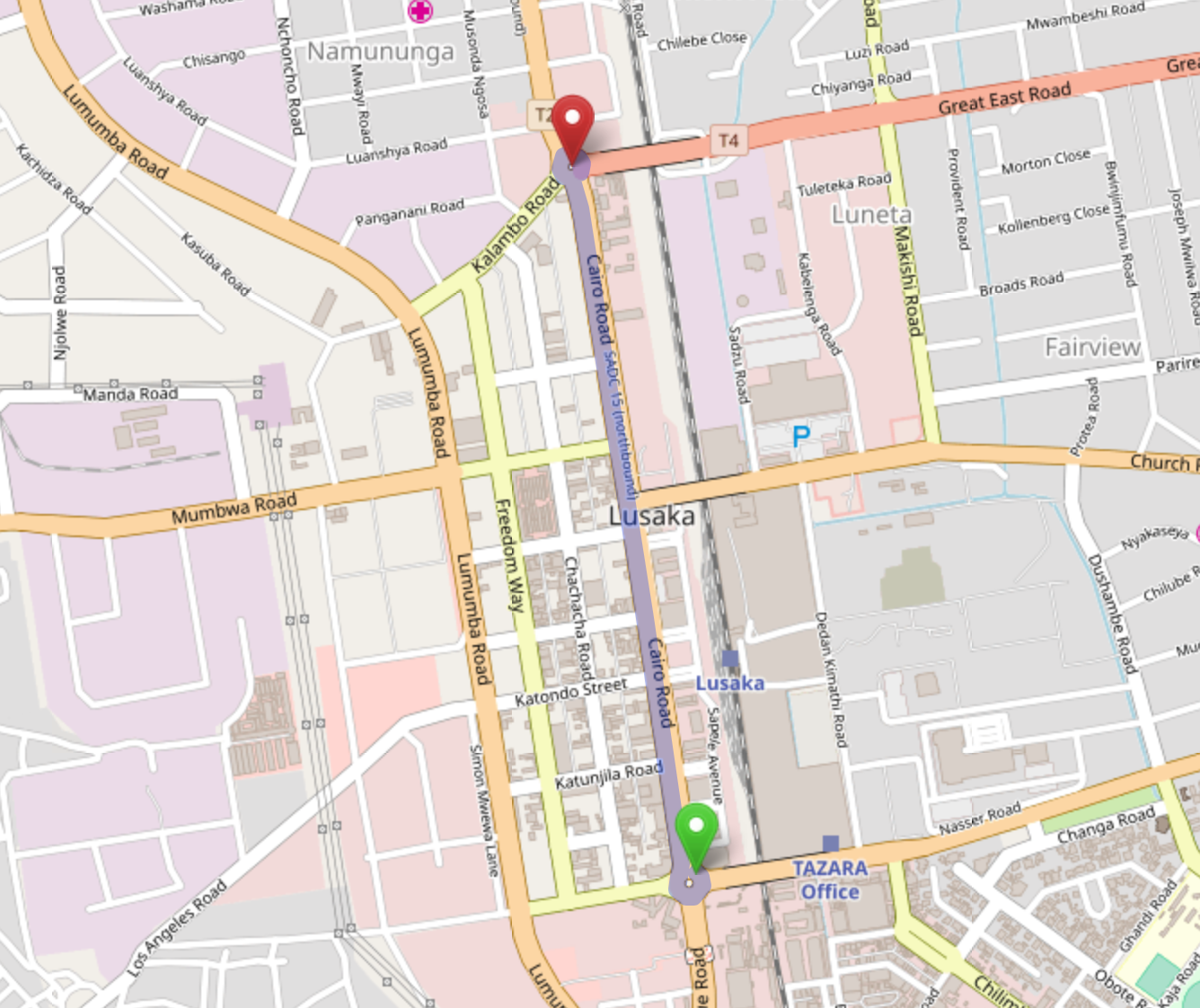
- Map showing Cairo Road through Lusaka

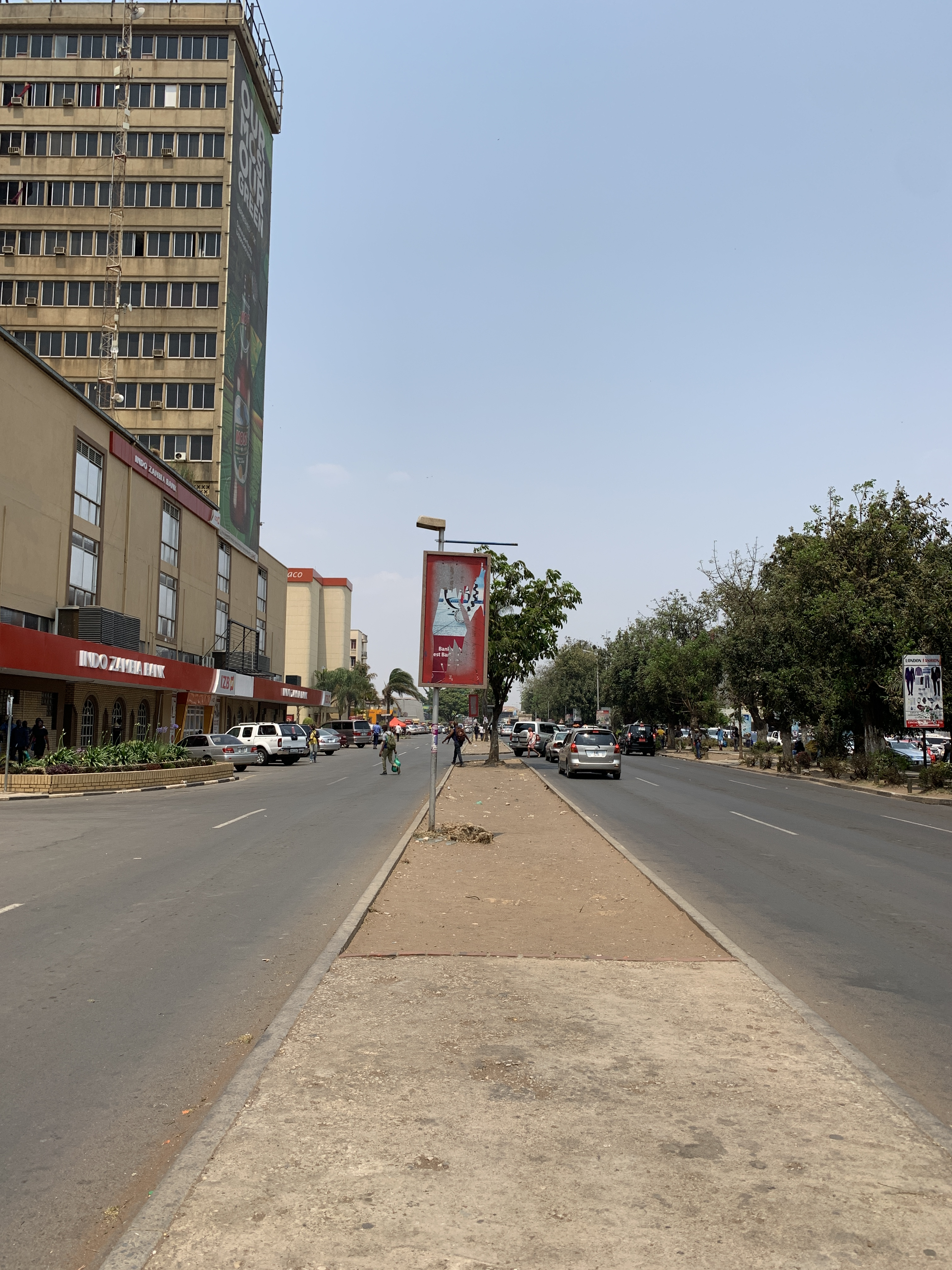

Location
- Country: Zambia

Highway system
- Transport in Zambia

Cairo Road is the main thoroughfare of Lusaka, Zambia and the principal business, retail and service centre of the city. It is a section of the T2 road and was so named because it is a link in Cecil Rhodes' then dream of a Cape to Cairo Road through British colonies in Africa.

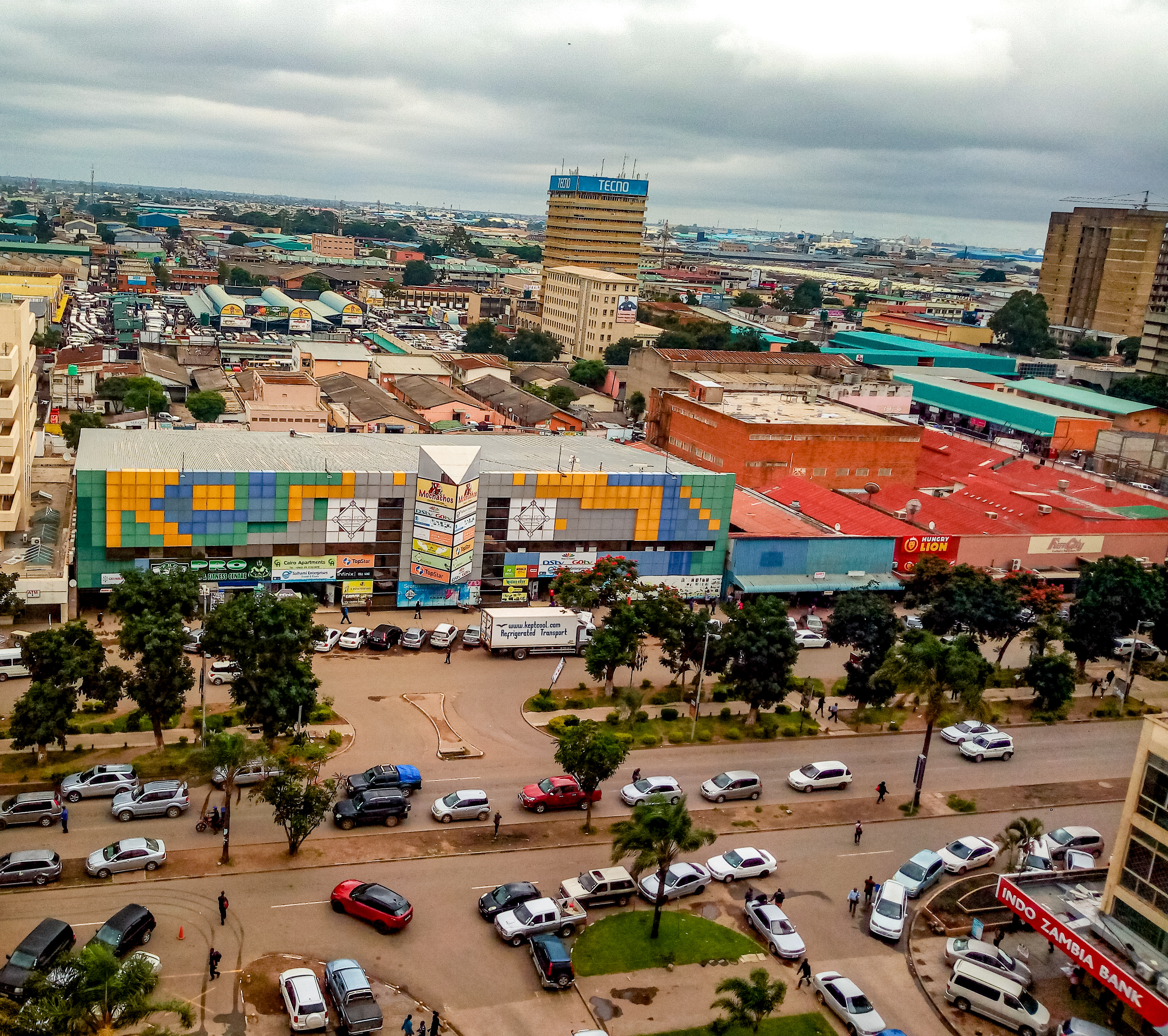
Cairo Road (2020)

Cairo Road is 1.8 km long, running north–south between the Great East Road junction (also known as the "Kabwe Roundabout") and the Independence Avenue junction (also known as the "Kafue Roundabout"), and is a wide dual carriageway with an avenue of trees down the centre. It runs parallel to the main railway line which is one block to the east. As the main north–south road it became very congested. This has been partially alleviated by the expansion of Lumumba Road to the west as a by-pass, taking much through traffic. All Heavy Goods vehicles are required to use Lumumba Road (not allowed on Cairo Road) when travelling from the southern side of the CBD to the northern side of the CBD and vice versa.

Despite this, Cairo Road frequently becomes very congested, as does much of Lusaka. This is primarily due to the lack of any major ring roads and the growth of Lusaka's population.

In 2020, a new road was opened, named the Lusaka West Ring Road, in order for traffic that doesn't intend on stopping in Lusaka to bypass the city centre to the west. So, with the opening of the new road, any vehicles that have no business in Lusaka and are travelling from the south (Kafue) to the north (Chibombo) (and vice versa) on the T2 road can avoid both Cairo Road and Lumumba Road.
