= Musalangu Game Management Area =

Musalangu Game Management Area (Musalangu GMA) is a Game Reserve in Zambia. It is situated in the valley of the Luangwa River, and borders the North Luangwa National Park to the north and east. To the east, the reserve extends to the border with Malawis Vwaza Marsh Game Reserve. Musalangu GMA covers an area of 17,350 km^{2} and forms a buffer zone for North Luangwa National Park. The vegetation consists mainly of miombo, mupapa, baobab, and mopane woodland. Among the most common animals in the area are buffalo, common duiker, eland, elephant, hartebeest, impala, kudu, puku, roan, waterbuck, warthog, wildebeest and zebra. Lions, leopards and spotted hyenas are also present. The human population in the park is estimated at just over 100,000. Since most people keep livestock or grow crops, wildlife conflicts occur relatively often.
