= Mpulungu =

- Town
- Location within Zambia
- Coordinates: 8°46′S 31°8′E
- Country: Zambia
- Province: Northern Province
- District: Mpulungu District
- Time zone: UTC+2 (CAT)
- Climate: Cwb

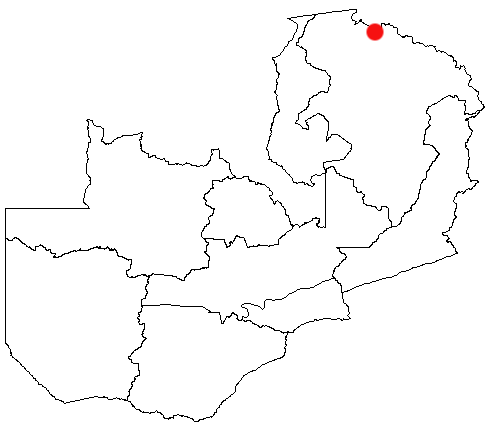
Location of Mpulungu in Zambia

Mpulungu is a town in the Northern Province of Zambia, at the southern tip of Lake Tanganyika.

From Mpulungu, boats reach DR Congo, Tanzania and Burundi. The MV Liemba ferry sails from Mpulungu to Kasanga and Kigoma in western Tanzania, with connections from there to Bujumbura.

Mpulungu is also a fishing port and lies at the end of the old Great North Road.

== Transport ==
In 2007 it was proposed to give Mpulungu rail access with a junction off the TAZARA line at Nseluka. This link plus another between Mpika and Mchinji would greater shorten the rail distance to a deepwater port at Nacala in Mozambique.

== History ==
In the period up to the First World War and for about a decade afterwards, all vessels at the southern end of Lake Tanganyika had to lie offshore at Katuta Bay and unload by lighter or local canoe. This was thought highly unsatisfactory as the SS Liemba was then exposed on a lee shore to storms from the Northerly trade winds which could cause a dangerous sharp swell in the shallow waters of the bay. Also the ship’s derricks could not be used efficiently to unload heavier or bulk cargoes like bags of cement or large oil drums.

J.H. Venning, the British South Africa Company Provincial Commissioner in Abercorn – then the Provincial Headquarters – had imported an ex Union Castle Line lifeboat that he used for fishing on the lake. During the course of these expeditions, he had come to regard the channel between Kumbula Island and the shore line at Mpulungu as a safe haven. One evening he was discussing the Katuta Bay problem with the Captain of the SS Liemba and mentioned the protected channel. Between them they then formed a plan to take the Governor, who was to visit shortly, on a fishing trip.

The fishing expedition duly took place in 1925. Venning took his boat into the channel and they landed and had a splendid picnic provided by the cook of the SS Liemba. When everyone was comfortable and excellent fishing and a good lunch and Champagne been enjoyed, Venning turned to the Captain of SS Liemba and said in as casual a tone of voice “Wouldn’t this make a good place for a harbour?” The Captain then replied with enthusiasm pointing out its many advantages. The Governor, at his ease and relaxed, then asked how much Venning thought it would cost. He probably thought that the cost would be so great that he could rule it out immediately. But Venning said “ Well I think I could fix it up for about £50” While £50 was a considerable sum in those far off days it was still far below a realistic cost. Venning knew that the Governor had discretion to spend £50 on his own say-so without having to go through estimates, budget and treasury procedures.

The Governor, maybe by then Sir Herbert Stanley, told Venning to go ahead. Venning knew that, with a little judicious juggling of funds and the use of the prisoners from Abercorn jail, he could construct the 27 mile road on a route he had already surveyed. He later obtained a grant of a further £150 to improve the road bridges, and build a jetty and a Customs warehouse. A Wharf was constructed by Tanganyika Railways in the 1930.

This was all completed on “budget” and Mpulungu was founded as the southern Transport Terminus of Lake Tanganyika.

== Sport ==
Mpulungu Harbour Football Club, who play at the Muzabwela Grounds, gained promotion in 2019 to the Zambian Division One.

== See also ==
- Transport in Zambia
- Railway stations in Zambia
