= North Luangwa National Park =

National park in Zambia

- IUCN category II (national park)
- Location within Zambia
- Location: Mpika District, Muchinga Province, Zambia
- Coordinates: 11°52′S 32°11′E
- Area: 4,636 km^{2} (1,790 sq mi)
- Established: 1972
- Governing body: Zambia Wildlife Authority

North Luangwa National Park is a national park in Zambia, the northernmost of the three in the valley of the Luangwa River. Founded as a game reserve in 1938, it became a national park in 1972 and now covers 4,636 km².

Like the South Luangwa National Park, its eastern boundary is the Luangwa River, while it rises to cover a stretch of the Muchinga Escarpment to the west. The Mwaleshi River flows east–west through the Centre of the park, the area to its south being a strict wilderness zone. It has generally suffered from a lack of investment and interest compared to the much more popular South Luangwa National Park.

== Biodiversity ==
The range of birds and mammals include Cookson's wildebeest, Crawshay's zebra and many antelopes and bird species. In 2003, black rhinoceroses were re-introduced to the park. Since 2005, the park, together with South Luangwa National Park, has been considered a Lion Conservation Unit.

A survey of the park's fungi was carried out in the rainy season of 1994-1995, focusing on riverine habitats and miombo woodlands. The resulting checklist recorded 126 species from 33 families. Almost all are larger basidiomycetes, brackets, mushrooms, puffballs and toadstools, with particular emphasis on ectomycorrhizal associates of miombo trees. The total number of fungal species in the park is likely to be much higher.

== Buffer zones ==
The National Parks of the Luangwa Valley are connected through and surrounded by several large Game reserve, which are ssupposed to form wildlife corridors and buffer zones. To the north and east of Musalangu Game Management Area borders the North Luangwa National Park. In the south, the Munyamadzi Game Management Area forms a corridor to South Luangwa National Park and Luambe National Park.
