= Mpika District =

Coordinates: 12°00′S 31°00′E

- District
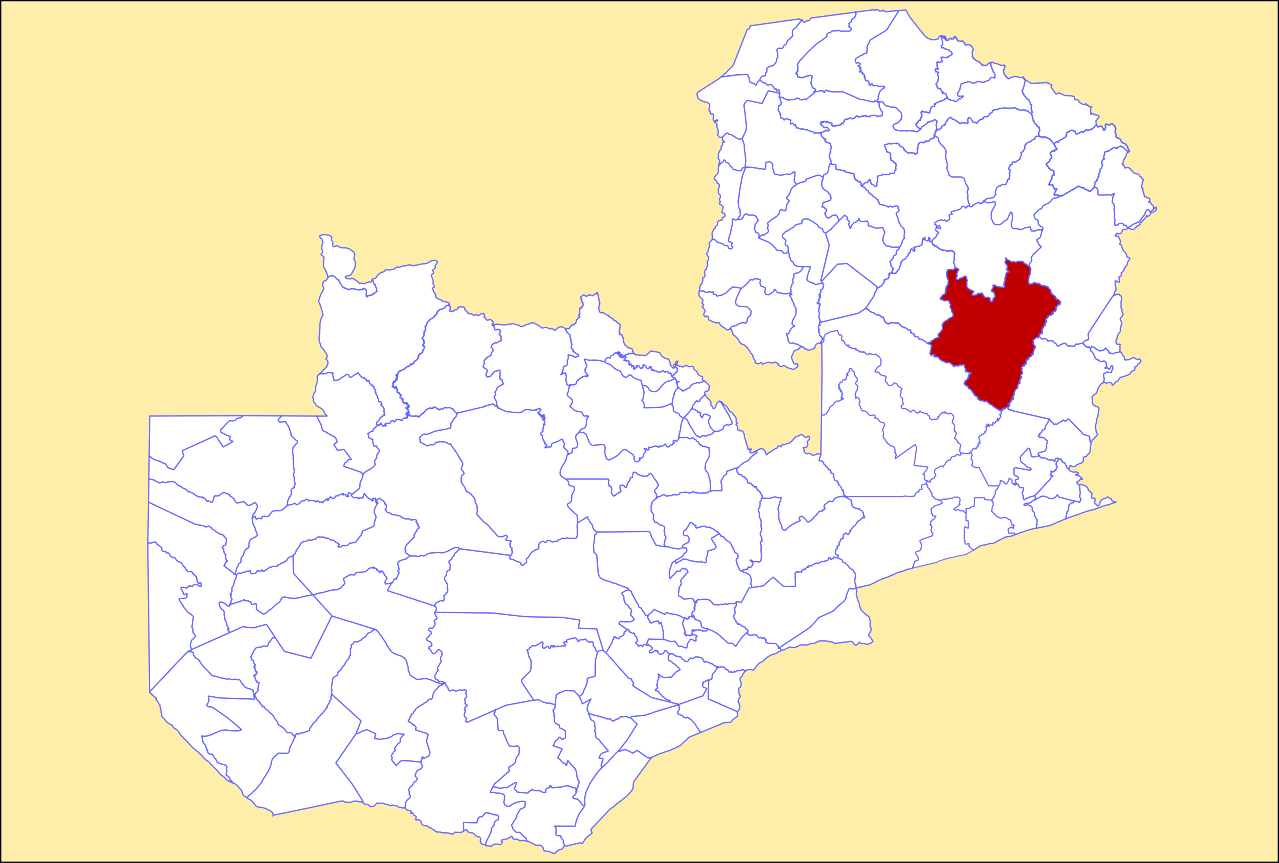
- District location in Zambia
- Country: Zambia
- Province: Muchinga Province
- Capital: Mpika

Area
  - Total: 17,409.1 km^{2} (6,721.7 sq mi)

Population (2022)
  - Total: 149,063
  - Density: 8.56236/km^{2} (22.1764/sq mi)
- Time zone: UTC+2 (CAT)

Mpika District is a district of Zambia, located in Muchinga Province. The capital lies at Mpika. As of the 2022 Zambian Census, the district had a population of 149,063 people. With the Luangwa River forming its eastern border, it has most of the South Luangwa National Park within its boundaries. It also contains the North Luangwa National Park.
