= Great North Road, Zambia =

Road in Zambia

Great North Road

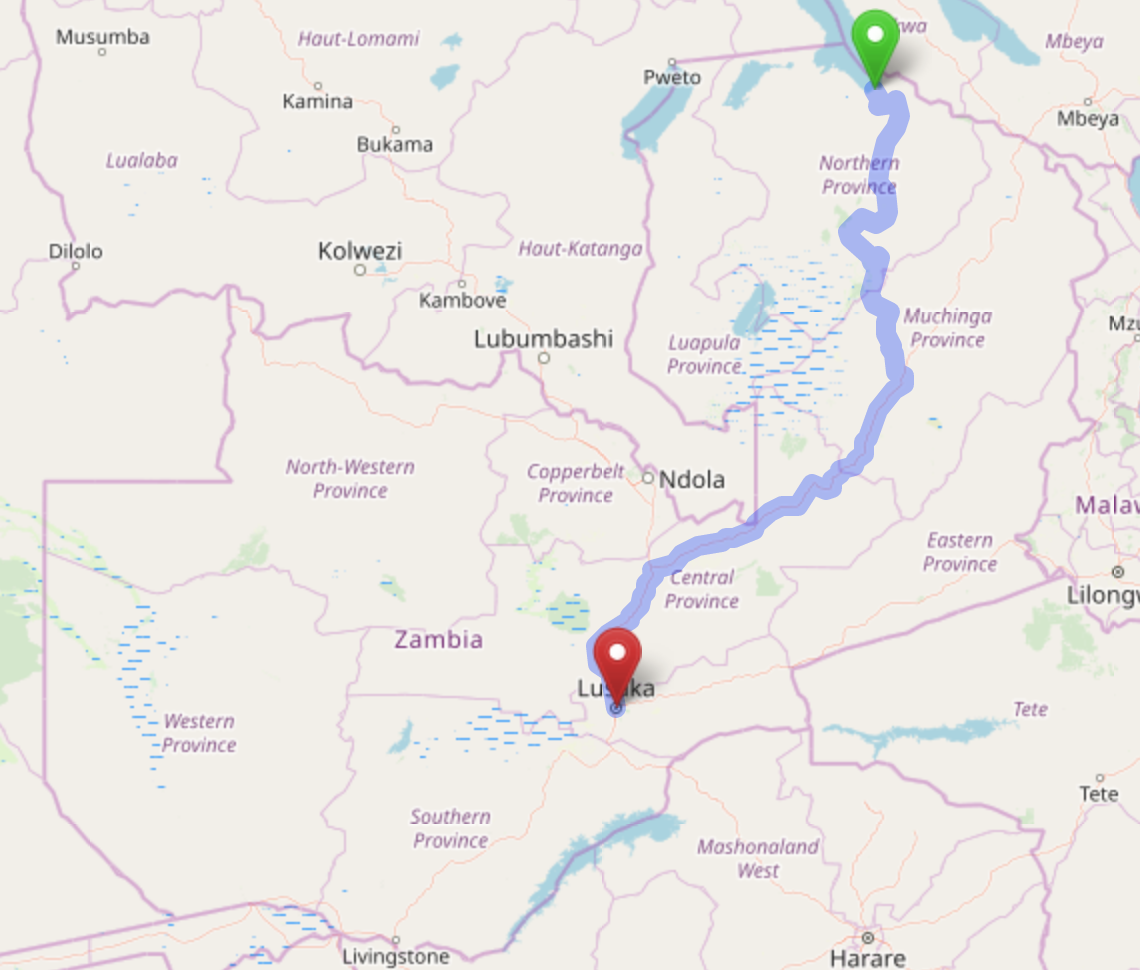
- Map showing the old Great North Road through Zambia

Route information
- Length: 1,019 km (633 mi)

Major junctions
- South-west end: T4 / M9 in Lusaka
- North-east end: Nakonde border with Tanzania

Location
- Country: Zambia

Highway system
- Transport in Zambia

The Great North Road is a major route in Zambia, running north from Lusaka through Kabwe, Kapiri Mposhi (the road continues by way of a right turn just north of Kapiri Mposhi), Serenje, Mpika, Isoka and Nakonde to the border with Tanzania. The entire route is designated as the T2 road on Zambia's road network. It forms the Zambian section of the Tanzam Highway.

Originally, the Great North Road continued as the route from Mpika northwards, through Kasama, to Mbala. Then, when the route from Mpika to Nakonde and Tanzania (the Tanzam Highway) was upgraded in the 1960s and provided a good route through to Dar es Salaam and Arusha, this section became known as the Great North Road rather than the Mpika-Mbala section which might be referred to as the Old Great North Road.

Originally, the Lusaka–Livingstone Road was regarded as part of the Great North Road and the southern terminus of the route was Livingstone. After the capital of the nation ceased to be Livingstone and became Lusaka in 1935, Lusaka was regarded as the southern terminus of the Great North Road (the route south of Lusaka was no-longer regarded as being part of the route).

== History ==
The original Great North Road of Zambia consisted of three current routes, namely the T1 road, T2 road and M1 road, from Livingstone, through Choma, Lusaka, Kabwe, Serenje, Mpika and Kasama, to Mbala. But today, Zambia's Great North Road is formed by only one route, which is the T2 road from Lusaka, through Kabwe, Serenje and Mpika, to Nakonde.

The original Great North Road of Zambia continued from Mpika as the route northwards, through Kasama, to Mbala. Then, when the route from Mpika north-east to Nakonde and Tanzania, designated as part of the T2, was upgraded in the 1960s and provided a good route through to Dar es Salaam (as part of the Tanzam Highway) and Arusha (as part of the Cape to Cairo Road), this section became known as the Great North Road. So, the section from Mpika to Mbala (currently designated as the M1 road) may now referred to as the Old Great North Road.

The Great North Road of Zambia initially started further south of Lusaka, at Livingstone (which was the capital of the nation before 1935) and then headed north-east from there, past Choma and Kafue, to reach Lusaka. Then, after the capital of the nation became Lusaka in 1935, Lusaka was regarded as the southern terminus of the Great North Road and the road connecting Lusaka to Livingstone (currently designated as the T1 road) was no-longer regarded as part of the route.

So, the current Great North Road of Zambia is the section of the T2 road from the Cairo Road/Great East Road junction in Lusaka, through Kabwe, Serenje and Mpika, to the border post with Tanzania at Nakonde (the entire Zambian section of the Tanzam Highway).

== Route ==
The Great North Road of Zambia is the section of the T2 from the border with Tanzania at Nakonde to the Cairo Road/Great East Road junction in Lusaka, that is the Zambian section of the Tanzam Highway. The entire route is part of the Cairo–Cape Town Highway and the section between Lusaka and Kapiri Mposhi is part of the Beira–Lobito Highway.

== The Hell Run ==
During the Rhodesian Bush War the border with Rhodesia was closed, disrupting the importation of goods and fuel to landlocked Zambia and the export of copper. The Great North Road was the only route by which goods and fuel could be imported, from the port of Dar es Salaam. Because of the bad condition of the road from Kapiri Mposhi to Tanzania and the many accidents that occurred the truck drivers called this stretch of the Great North Road "The Hell Run". Later, the Tazama Pipeline, commissioned in 1968, and the TAZARA Railway, opened in 1975, meant the use of the Great North Road for the transport of cargo destined for Zambia was much reduced.
