= Isoka =

- Town
- Location in Zambia
- Coordinates: 10°08′00″S 32°38′00″E
- Country: Zambia
- Province: Muchinga Province
- District: Isoka District
- Time zone: UTC+2 (CAT)

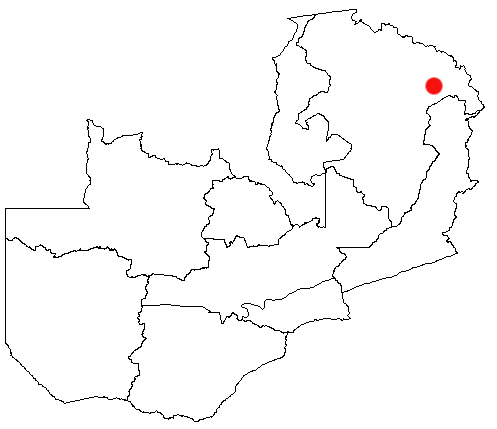
Location of Isoka in Zambia

Isoka is a town located in the Muchinga Province of Zambia near the borders with Tanzania and Malawi. It lies on the T2 road (Tanzam Highway; Great North Road).

== Area ==
The area of the district now (2020) is 5,091 km^{2}.

== Population ==
The district is populated mainly by Mwanga and Tumbuka people. The senior chief of the district is Kafwimbi. The traditional ceremony called Ngondo is celebrated in the district.

== History ==
The district town of Isoka is 70 miles from the border with Tangayika, which had been a German colony until 1918. During the Second World War, Isoka was the official border post. Military convoys of up to 100 vehicles stopped at Isoka on their way to the battlefields in East Africa and the Western Desert. The road then was untarred.

In 1966, Isoka had a secondary school, for boys only; it had no water supply, water was collected from the stream. The Great North Road between Tunduma in Tanzania and Kapiri Mposhi was still the only road connection.

== Climate ==
Isoka features a humid subtropical climate (Köppen: Cwa), bordering a tropical savanna climate (Köppen: Aw), characterized by warm temperatures and distinct wet and dry seasons. The period between September and November features the hottest daytime temperatures. June and July are the coolest months. The wet season lasts from November to April and brings significant rainfall. The dry season, from May to October, is marked by a lack of precipitation.

Climate data for Isoka (1991–2020)
Month	Jan	Feb	Mar	Apr	May	Jun	Jul	Aug	Sep	Oct	Nov	Dec	Year
Record high °C (°F)	39.2 (102.6)	31.9 (89.4)	31.0 (87.8)	31.5 (88.7)	31.2 (88.2)	30.6 (87.1)	35.4 (95.7)	33.3 (91.9)	39.0 (102.2)	39.8 (103.6)	36.8 (98.2)	38.1 (100.6)	39.8 (103.6)
Mean daily maximum °C (°F)	27.5 (81.5)	27.3 (81.1)	27.3 (81.1)	26.7 (80.1)	26.3 (79.3)	25.5 (77.9)	25.4 (77.7)	27.9 (82.2)	30.8 (87.4)	32.5 (90.5)	31.6 (88.9)	28.5 (83.3)	26.0 (78.8)
Daily mean °C (°F)	22.3 (72.1)	22.2 (72.0)	22.1 (71.8)	21.3 (70.3)	19.6 (67.3)	18.1 (64.6)	17.7 (63.9)	19.8 (67.6)	22.4 (72.3)	24.4 (75.9)	24.6 (76.3)	22.9 (73.2)	21.4 (70.5)
Mean daily minimum °C (°F)	17.1 (62.8)	17.1 (62.8)	16.9 (62.4)	15.8 (60.4)	12.9 (55.2)	10.7 (51.3)	10.0 (50.0)	11.6 (52.9)	13.9 (57.0)	16.3 (61.3)	17.5 (63.5)	17.3 (63.1)	13.7 (56.7)
Record low °C (°F)	10.8 (51.4)	10.6 (51.1)	11.6 (52.9)	9.5 (49.1)	7.4 (45.3)	4.7 (40.5)	1.9 (35.4)	5.6 (42.1)	1.1 (34.0)	10.0 (50.0)	10.0 (50.0)	12.0 (53.6)	1.1 (34.0)
Average precipitation mm (inches)	231.2 (9.10)	223.8 (8.81)	171.4 (6.75)	71.8 (2.83)	7.1 (0.28)	0.2 (0.01)	0.2 (0.01)	0.1 (0.00)	0.1 (0.00)	8.4 (0.33)	68.4 (2.69)	218.0 (8.58)	1,000.8 (39.40)
Source: NOAA
