= Nakonde =

- Town
- Location in Zambia
- Coordinates: 09°19′53.2″S 32°45′17.2″E
- Country: Zambia
- Province: Muchinga Province
- District: Nakonde District
- Elevation: 1,306 m (4,285 ft)

Population (2018 Estimate)
  - Total: 10,652
- Time zone: UTC+2 (CAT)

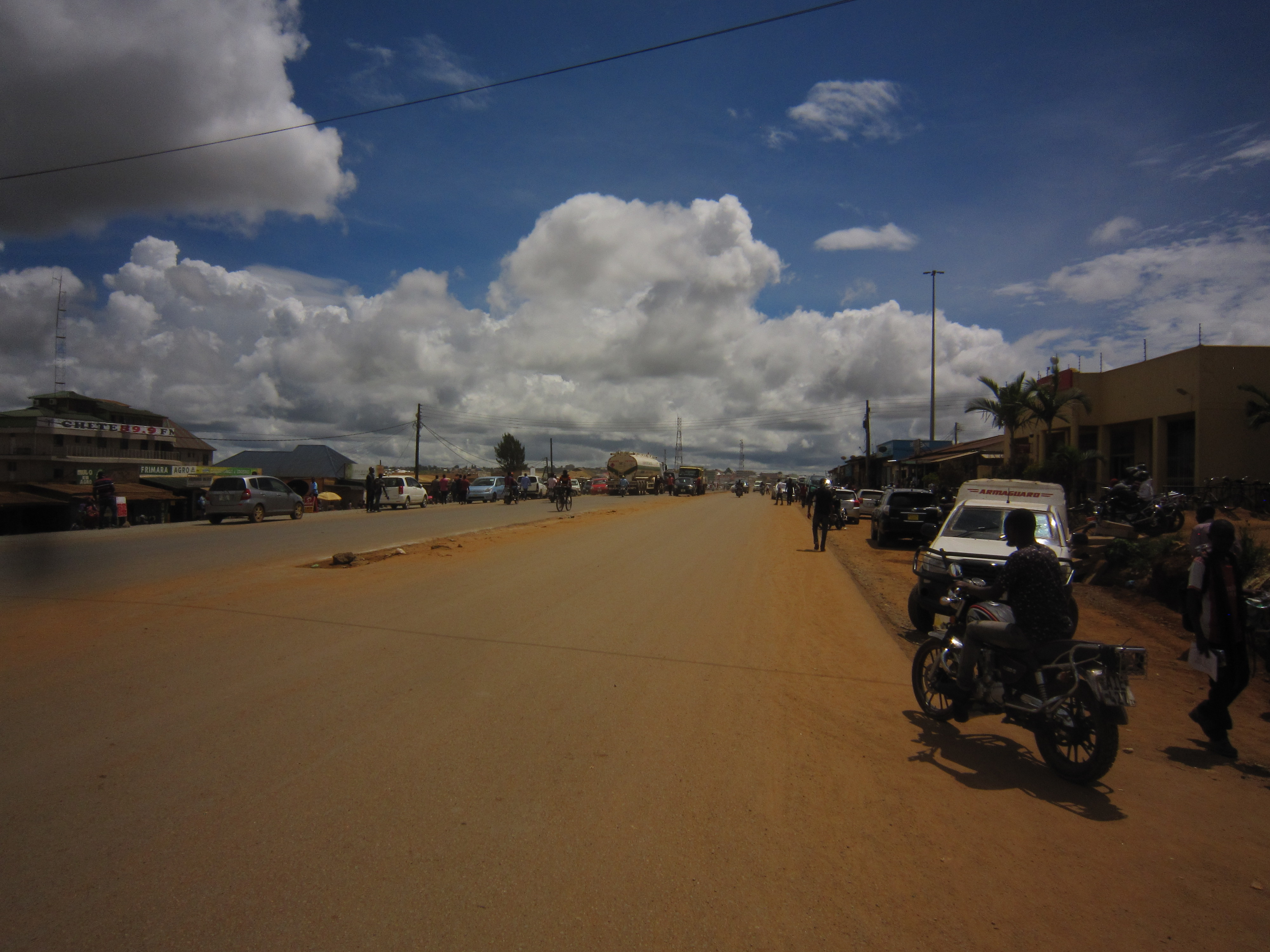
Nakonde main street

Nakonde is a town in the Muchinga Province of Zambia, on the border with Tanzania. It is at the northern end of Zambia's Great North Road (T2 Road). It is the principal commercial and political headquarters of Nakonde District and the district headquarters are located here.

== Location ==
Nakonde sits directly across Tunduma, in Tanzania's Songwe Region, separated by the international border between Zambia and Tanzania. It is located on the Great North Road, about 990 kilometres (615 mi), north-east of Lusaka, the capital and largest city of Zambia. It is the last Zambian town on the Cape to Cairo Road, also known as the Pan-African Highway, which goes from Cape Town to Cairo.

This is approximately 350 kilometres (217 mi), by road, north of Mpika, the largest city in the province. The geographical coordinates of the town are: 09°19'38.0"S, 32°45'30.0"E (Latitude:-9.327222; Longitude:32.758333). The average elevation of Nakonde is about 1,306 metres (4,285 ft), above sea level. Roughly 10 kilometres (6.2 mi) to the west is Chozi.

== Overview ==
Nakonde lies on the main Highway that connects Lusaka, the capital of Zambia, to Kapiri Mposhi, Isoka, through Nakonde and on to Tunduma and Dar es Salaam, in neighboring Tanzania. The town is a busy border crossing with both rail and road traffic. The TAZARA Railway passes through the town.

Three banks maintain branches in Nakonde; Barclays Bank of Zambia, Atlas Mara Bank Zambia Limited and Zambia National Commercial Bank.

It is estimated that 85 percent of Zambia's exports transit through Nakonde. However, inadequate housing, poor road infrastructure, lack of readily available grid electricity, inadequate supply of potable water, an under-developed sewerage system, poor schools and the absence of a post-secondary educational institution (university), are some of the challenges facing the town.

== Population ==
As of February 2006, the population of Nakonde was estimated at 10,652 people.

== See also ==
- TAZARA Railway
