= A3 road (Ethiopia) =

Road in Ethiopia

A3 Road

Route information
- Maintained by Ethiopia National Highways Authority

Major junctions
- North end: Addis Ababa
- South end: Gondar

Location
- Country: Ethiopia

Highway system
- Transport in Ethiopia

The A3 Road is a national route in Ethiopia. The primary highway spans around 762 kilometers from Addis Ababa, the capital, to Gondar in the northwest region of the country. The road links the central highlands of Ethiopia to its northwestern parts.

== Route ==
The central-western and northwestern parts of Ethiopia are crossed by the A3 trunk road in a wavy length of 762 kilometers that links Addis Ababa with Gondar. Despite not being the most direct route between these two cities, it passes through Ethiopian Highlands, skirts Lake Tana and ascends and descends over Blue Nile valley with a difference of 1500 metres. Generally, the road only has one asphalt lane expect for Addis Ababa where there are two. The A3 traverses varied terrain, including a mountain pass north of Addis Ababa reaching 2,800 meters and sections ranging from 1,800 to 3,000 meters above sea level. Apart from Addis Ababa and Gondar, the route passes through no other major cities. Notably, the A3 is part of two Trans-Africa Highways: Trans-Africa Highway 4 (Cairo to Cape Town) and Trans-Africa Highway 6 (N'Djamena to Djibouti), with the northern section between Gondar and Wereta being double-numbered.

== History ==
The A3 road was initially constructed in the early 20th century and underwent significant improvements between 1936 and 1940 during Italian administration, becoming one of Ethiopia's primary roads. Historically, Gondar held importance as a regional center in northwestern Ethiopia, despite its modest size. In the 20th century, the road saw limited upgrades, with a notable exception being the opening of the first modern Blue Nile bridge in Bahir Dar in 1961. On September 10, 2008, a new Blue Nile Bridge was inaugurated, replacing an older structure and marking a milestone as East Africa's first cable-stayed bridge.

Before, A3 was the name given, which was according to some sources extended up to Adwa near Eritrean border. However, in around 2013, a new road numbering system was introduced and it made that the A3 designation terminate at Gondar while what was left was re-numbered as B30. In Bahir Dar on May 12, 2024, a double cable-stayed bridge over the Nile River was opened.
