= Kasama, Zambia =

Kasama
- Town
- Nickname: Aba saamike akatambala ku chimuti
- Location in Zambia
- Coordinates: 10°12′42″S 31°10′42″E
- Country: Zambia
- Province: Northern Province
- District: Kasama District
- Elevation: 4,508 ft (1,374 m)

Population (2022 census)
  - Total: 348,552
- Time zone: UTC+2 (CAT)
- Postal codes: Kasama town and other areas districts of northern province use the 410 postcode
- Climate: Cwa

Kasama is a town in the Northern Province of Zambia. It serves as the provincial capital and the headquarters of Kasama District.

== Location ==
It is situated on the central-southern African plateau, approximately 856 kilometres (532 mi), by road, north-east of Lusaka, the capital and largest city in Zambia.

Kasama is located on the M1 road (old Great North Road) from Mpika in the south to Mbala and Mpulungu, at the tip of Lake Tanganyika, in the north.

== Population ==
The city population grew considerably in the 1970s and 1980s after construction of the TAZARA Railway through the city, and the tarring of the old Great North Road. Its population, according to Encyclopedia Britannica, was 74,243 in 2000 and had increased to 113,779 in 2010.

== History ==
The 1898/1899 interregnum on the Mwamba throne, the then second in rank from the Chitimukulu, made it possible for Catholic Bishop Joseph 'Moto Moto' Dupont to facilitate the establishment of the British colonial administration of North-Eastern Rhodesia under Administrator Robert Codrington. The first BSAC administrative boma was established at Kasama. Due to the town's central location as well as its closeness to Chitimukulu's and Mwamba's courts, it eventually became the largest and dominant town of the north-eastern lobe of Northern Rhodesia, then later, Zambia.

== Economic activities ==
The town has a few modern facilities, among them are a Shoprite branch, Golden Oaklet, Bookworld and a modern shopping mall. The town has branches of Zambian commercial banks including Zambia National Commercial Bank, National Savings & Credit Bank, Atlas Mara Bank Zambia Limited, Standard Chartered Zambia, Cavmont Bank, Barclays Bank of Zambia, Access Bank Zambia and Indo-Zambia Bank Limited. The town has VISA and ATM services.

Most people in Kasama are not formally employed, and they run small businesses to earn a living. The hospital is the Kasama General Hospital, that provides locals with health services. The city has a police station and several police posts. The available mobile telephone operators include MTN Group, Airtel Zambia and Zamtel.

There are several Agri Based industries in Kasama, which include Northern Coffee Company Limited (NCCL), a subsidiary of Olam International, growing coffee at Kateshi Estates, and Kalungwishi Estates growing sugar cane and producing the Kasama Sugar brand.

== Ethnic groups ==
Kasama is in the heartland of the Bemba ethnic group, whose Paramount Chief Chitimukulu maintains his headquarters 9 kilometres (6 mi) from Malole in Mungwi District, which is 51 kilometres (32 mi) east of the Kasama city center.

== Suburbs ==
Kasama has the following residential compounds within the district council boundaries:

- Central Town (the largest)
- New Town or Mbulo
- Location
- Mukulumpe
- Chikumanino

The compounds below are out of the council boundary:

- Mulenga Hills
- Jazz
- Tazara
- Misamfu
- Milima
- Chiba
- Chitamba
- Brown
- Winberg
- Kasama Village
- Kungu
- Mutale/Milenge
- Chisanga
- Soft Katongo
- Lua Luo

== Transport ==
Kasama is served by a good network of highways. It is on the M1 road, which goes south to Mpika and north to Mbala. The M3 road connects Kasama with Luwingu, Mansa and the Congo Pedicle in the west. The D18 road connects Kasama with Mungwi and Isoka in the east.

The 1,067 mm (3 ft 6 in) gauge TAZARA Railway connects Tanzania to the north-east via Kasama, with Zambia Railways at Kapiri Mposhi to the south-west.

Air transport is accessible through Kasama Airport. It can accommodate small aircraft, and it is undergoing an upgrade to be able to accommodate larger aircraft. It was expected to be ready by the end of 2017, but was complete in 2023.

== Rivers ==
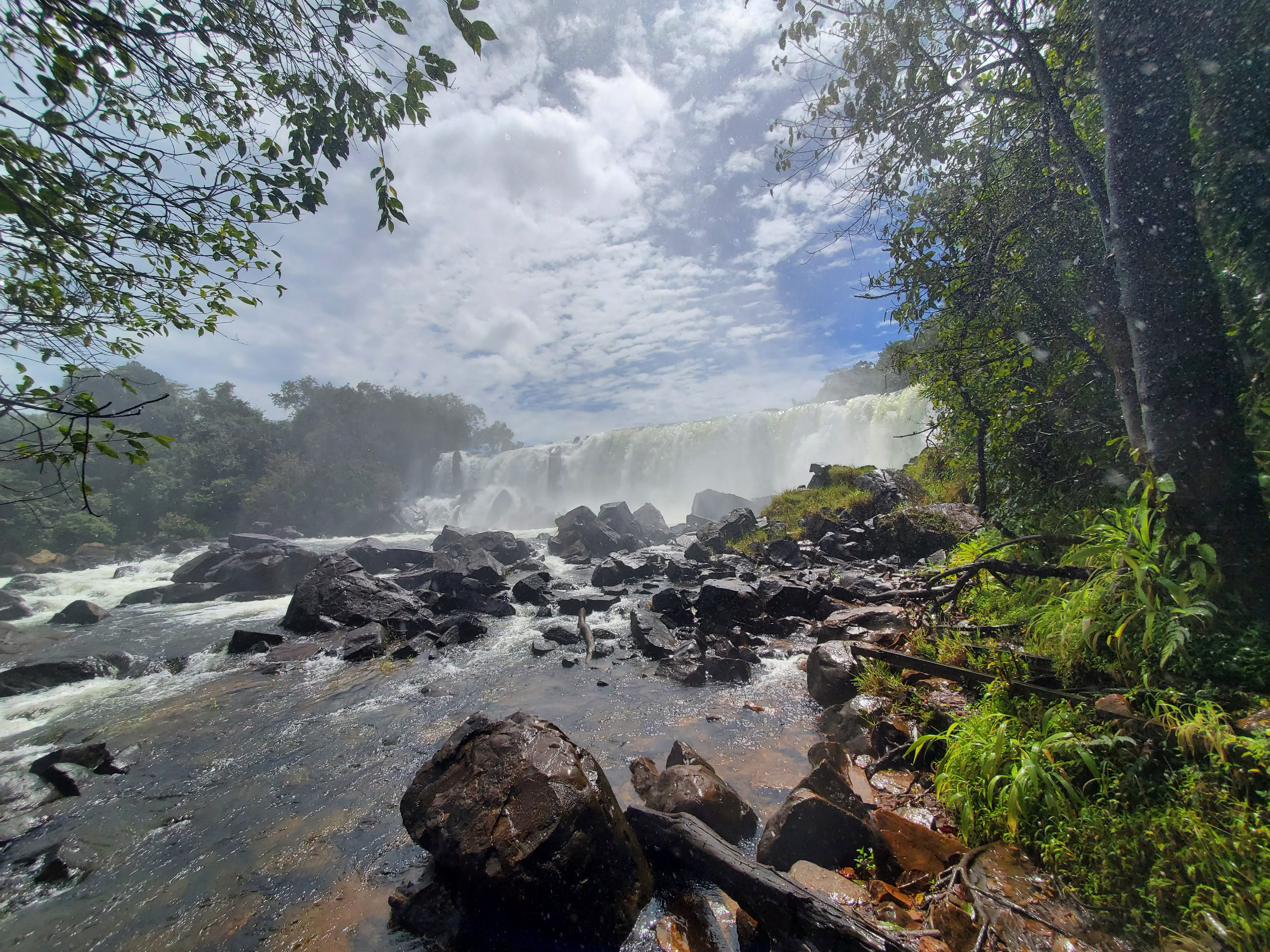
Mutumuna Falls

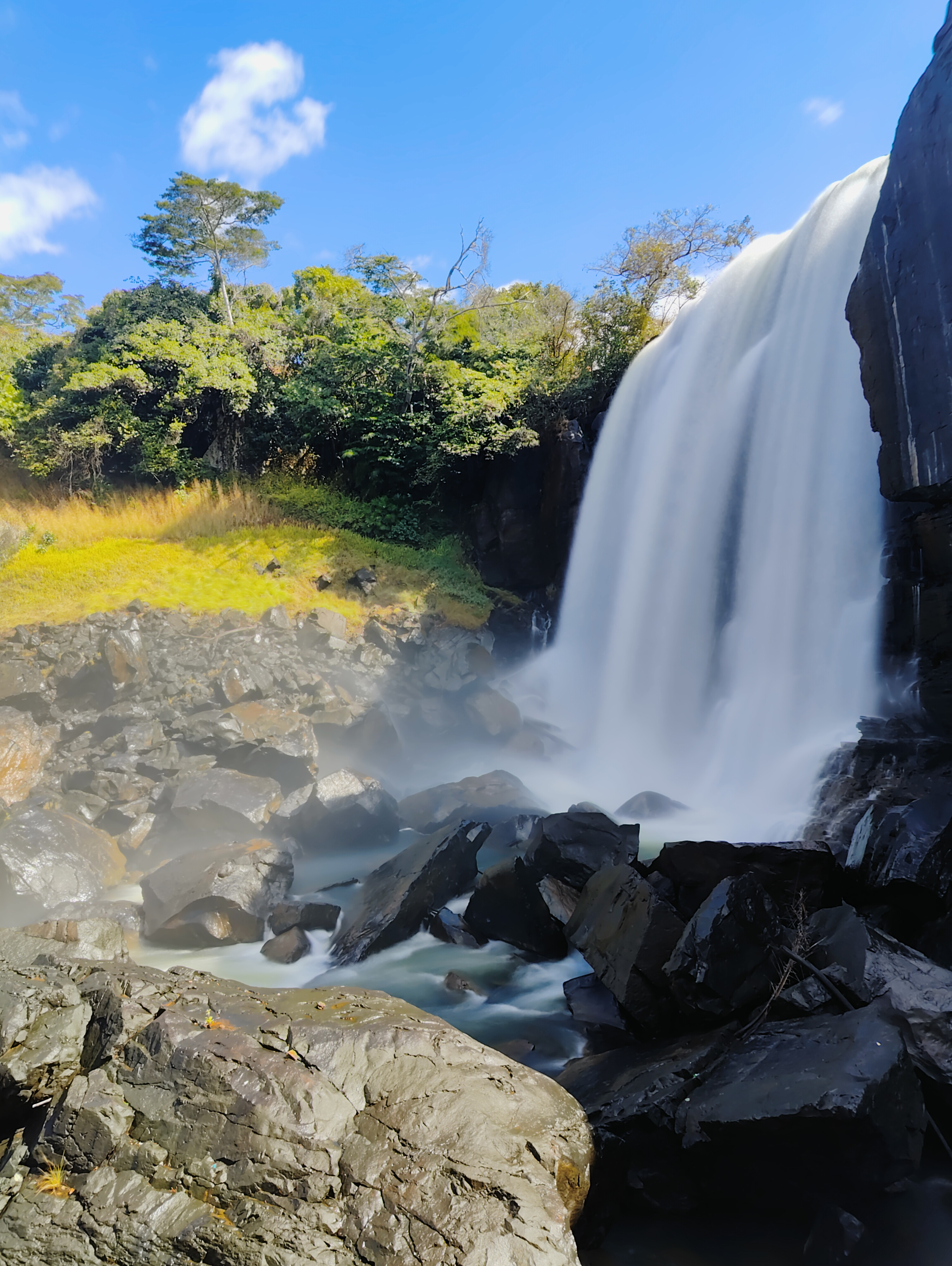
Chishimba Falls

Kasama District has five main rivers, namely: Chambeshi, Lukulu, Lukupa, Lubansenshi and Luombe. The Chishimba Falls are found across the Luombe River and are one of the major tourist attractions in Zambia. The falls host the 15 megawatts Chishimba Hydroelectric Power Station.

== Climate ==
Kasama features a humid subtropical climate (Köppen: Cwa), close to a tropical savanna climate (Köppen: Aw), with clear wet and dry seasons. October and November are the hottest months, while June and July are the coolest months. The wet season, from November to April, experiences high levels of humidity and rainfall, while the dry season, from May to September, is nearly rainless.

Climate data for Kasama (Kasama Airport) (1991–2020, extremes 1961–2020)
Month	Jan	Feb	Mar	Apr	May	Jun	Jul	Aug	Sep	Oct	Nov	Dec	Year
Record high °C (°F)	32.2 (90.0)	37.0 (98.6)	33.1 (91.6)	33.1 (91.6)	32.1 (89.8)	32.1 (89.8)	30.9 (87.6)	34.0 (93.2)	36.5 (97.7)	36.9 (98.4)	36.8 (98.2)	33.2 (91.8)	37.0 (98.6)
Mean daily maximum °C (°F)	27.1 (80.8)	27.2 (81.0)	27.6 (81.7)	27.3 (81.1)	27.1 (80.8)	25.9 (78.6)	25.6 (78.1)	27.9 (82.2)	30.6 (87.1)	31.6 (88.9)	30.3 (86.5)	27.8 (82.0)	29.2 (84.6)
Daily mean °C (°F)	21.8 (71.2)	21.8 (71.2)	22.0 (71.6)	21.3 (70.3)	19.9 (67.8)	18.1 (64.6)	17.6 (63.7)	19.8 (67.6)	22.5 (72.5)	24.0 (75.2)	23.6 (74.5)	22.3 (72.1)	21.2 (70.2)
Mean daily minimum °C (°F)	16.5 (61.7)	16.4 (61.5)	16.4 (61.5)	15.3 (59.5)	12.6 (54.7)	10.2 (50.4)	9.6 (49.3)	11.6 (52.9)	14.3 (57.7)	16.4 (61.5)	16.9 (62.4)	16.7 (62.1)	13.4 (56.1)
Record low °C (°F)	8.2 (46.8)	13.1 (55.6)	12.8 (55.0)	9.8 (49.6)	2.4 (36.3)	1.0 (33.8)	2.5 (36.5)	0.0 (32.0)	8.5 (47.3)	11.4 (52.5)	12.6 (54.7)	10.9 (51.6)	0.0 (32.0)
Average precipitation mm (inches)	254.4 (10.02)	248.1 (9.77)	238.9 (9.41)	67.0 (2.64)	2.6 (0.10)	0.0 (0.0)	0.0 (0.0)	0.2 (0.01)	2.3 (0.09)	35.5 (1.40)	101.5 (4.00)	261.4 (10.29)	1,217.6 (47.94)
Average relative humidity (%)	82.7	82.3	82.1	77.3	69.5	63.2	57.6	51.9	44.4	50.2	67.4	80.6	67.4
Mean monthly sunshine hours	133.3	134.4	179.8	222.0	288.3	297.0	306.9	306.9	279.0	251.1	207.0	151.9	2,757.6
Source: NOAA

== World War I ==
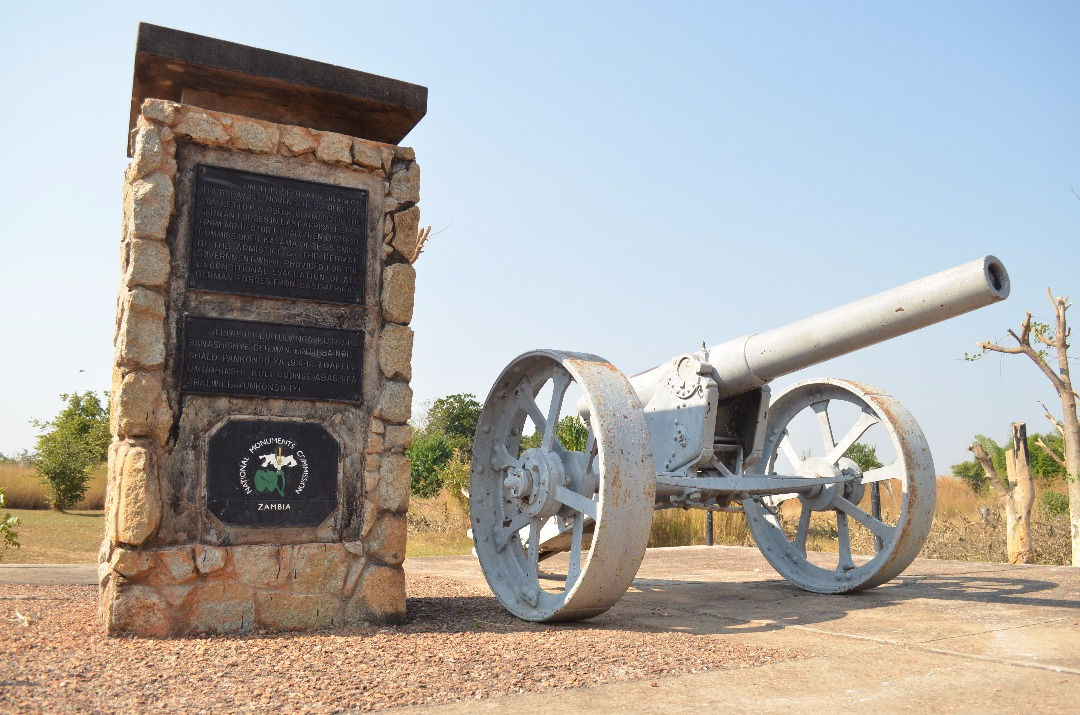
Chambeshi Monument commemorating notification of von Lettow-Vorbeck of the signing of the armistice at the end of WWI, 3 days after the end of the war in Europe.

At the end of World War I, when it consisted of a handful of government offices and a dozen stores, it was evacuated by its British population of a couple of dozen in the face of a surprise raid from the north-east by German East African forces under General Paul von Lettow-Vorbeck. Not knowing that the armistice had occurred in Europe the day before, the Germans took the abandoned town on 12 November 1918 and continued south-west (there was no battle at Kasama since the British imperial forces were at Abercorn), agreeing a cease-fire at the Chambeshi River on 14 November when they were informed of the German surrender in Europe. For further details, see Von Lettow-Vorbeck Memorial.

== Art ==
Kasama is known for the Stone Age rock art in the surrounding area.

== Notable people ==
- Alexander Chikwanda - Minister of Finance, 2011-2016, born in Kasama.

== See also ==
- Railway stations in Zambia
- St. John the Apostle Cathedral, Kasama
