= Mpika =

Town in Zambia

- Town
- Location in Zambia
- Coordinates: 11°51′00″S 31°26′00″E
- Country: Zambia
- Province: Muchinga Province
- District: Mpika District
- Time zone: UTC+2 (CAT)

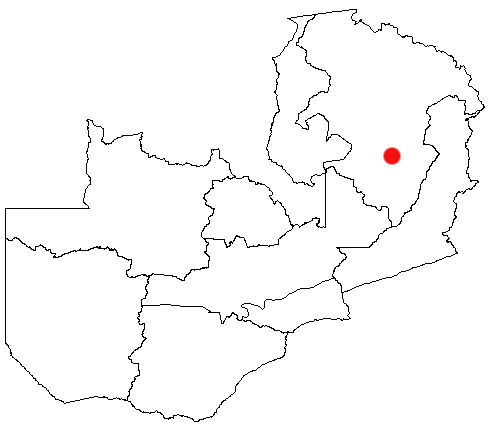
Location of Mpika in Zambia

Mpika is a town in the Muchinga Province of Zambia, lying at the junction of the M1 road to Kasama and Mbala and the Tanzam Highway (Great North Road) to Dar es Salaam, Tanzania in the north-east and Lusaka in the south-west. It also has a railway station on the TAZARA Railway about 5 kilometres (3 mi) west of the town centre. Mpika is situated between the Muchinga Escarpment to the east and vast miombo plains to the west. The town has an estimated population of 40,000 inhabitants (2008), while the district population is 149,063 inhabitants as of the 2022 Zambian census.

== History ==
In about 1930, Mpika was selected as a way-point on the air route from Europe to South Africa, and an airfield was built there. Gervas Clay, wife to Betty Clay, was posted to Luwingu in 1930 as a Provincial Administrator in Her Majesty's Overseas Civil Service. One of his tasks was to arrange for the purchase and transport of dried fish and maize to Mpika to supply the construction workers.

His letters from England came out by sea to Cape Town, by rail to Broken Hill (now Kabwe), by lorry from Kapiri Mposhi to Mpika (280 miles) and Kasama (another 136 miles), and from Kasama by runner to Luwingu (124 miles). The mailman was clad in a red fez and scarlet tunic and shorts, and barefoot, and referred to as a "Scarlet Runner". Previously, the Great North Road (also known as the Great North Rut) was an earth road, marked by an incredible number of pot-holes. By 1939, his letters to and from home travelled by air – from "Scarlet runner" to airmail in only nine years which indicated the rapid pace of change in Central Africa at this time.

== Climate ==
Mpika has a humid subtropical climate (Köppen: Cwa).

Climate data for Mpika
Month	Jan	Feb	Mar	Apr	May	Jun	Jul	Aug	Sep	Oct	Nov	Dec	Year
Record high °C (°F)	30.4 (86.7)	31.0 (87.8)	30.5 (86.9)	30.1 (86.2)	31.0 (87.8)	29.2 (84.6)	29.2 (84.6)	31.5 (88.7)	33.8 (92.8)	37.7 (99.9)	34.5 (94.1)	32.4 (90.3)	37.7 (99.9)
Mean daily maximum °C (°F)	25.7 (78.3)	26.2 (79.2)	26.0 (78.8)	25.3 (77.5)	24.2 (75.6)	22.9 (73.2)	22.5 (72.5)	24.3 (75.7)	27.8 (82.0)	29.7 (85.5)	28.6 (83.5)	26.0 (78.8)	25.8 (78.4)
Daily mean °C (°F)	19.9 (67.8)	19.9 (67.8)	20.0 (68.0)	19.4 (66.9)	17.5 (63.5)	15.6 (60.1)	15.4 (59.7)	17.5 (63.5)	20.9 (69.6)	22.6 (72.7)	22.1 (71.8)	20.1 (68.2)	19.2 (66.6)
Mean daily minimum °C (°F)	16.0 (60.8)	16.1 (61.0)	15.9 (60.6)	14.8 (58.6)	12.4 (54.3)	9.8 (49.6)	9.2 (48.6)	10.8 (51.4)	13.7 (56.7)	16.0 (60.8)	16.5 (61.7)	16.2 (61.2)	13.9 (57.0)
Record low °C (°F)	1.0 (33.8)	12.8 (55.0)	11.2 (52.2)	8.4 (47.1)	2.4 (36.3)	2.7 (36.9)	1.1 (34.0)	3.6 (38.5)	6.0 (42.8)	7.9 (46.2)	5.0 (41.0)	12.6 (54.7)	1.0 (33.8)
Average precipitation mm (inches)	239.2 (9.42)	230.4 (9.07)	163.9 (6.45)	39.4 (1.55)	5.4 (0.21)	0.2 (0.01)	0.1 (0.00)	0.1 (0.00)	2.4 (0.09)	10.4 (0.41)	93.8 (3.69)	254.7 (10.03)	1,040 (40.94)
Average precipitation days (≥ 1.0 mm)	22	19	16	6	1	0	0	0	0	2	10	22	98
Average relative humidity (%)	82.4	80.6	78.1	73.9	67.5	61.7	56.2	51.5	43.8	47.0	58.2	77.1	64.8
Mean monthly sunshine hours	124.0	134.4	179.8	216.0	285.2	264.0	291.4	303.8	291.0	291.4	213.0	124.0	2,718
Source: NOAA

== Transport ==
=== Road ===
Mpika is at the junction of two routes, namely the M1 road and the T2 road. The M1 road connects north to Kasama and Mbala in the Northern Province. The T2 road, also known as the Great North Road and the Tanzam Highway, connects north-east to Chinsali and the border with Tanzania at Nakonde and south-west to Serenje, Kapiri Mposhi, Kabwe and Lusaka.

=== Rail ===
Mpika is on the TAZARA Railway, which connects south-west to Serenje and Kapiri Mposhi and north to Kasama and the border with Tanzania at Nakonde. In 2007, an extension of Malawi Railways from Mchinji and Chipata to Mpika was proposed, with a junction linking with the TAZARA Railway.

== Tourism and infrastructure ==
The tourism sector is growing steadily in and around Mpika. Mpika Tourism Association is a newly founded non-profit organisation providing information and linkages to local accommodation and service providers; the information centre/office is situated at Bayama's Lodge behind Continental Filling Station. Mpika town offers a good market with local products, 5 filling stations, GM Trading supermarket, accommodation of all standards. Various piturescque waterfalls are situated in the whole region. North- and South Luangwa National Parks are just 5–8 hours away, but the roads are seasonal (please ask at info-centre). Touristic Highlights of the region are Shiwa Ng'andu (colonial style manor house), Kapishya Hotsprings, Mutinondo Wilderness Camp, Nachikufu caves (rock paintings).

== Education ==
Many local schools are battling in bad infrastructure with overcrowded classrooms and teachers shortages. TAZARA workshops offers the biggest training centre of railway related education in whole Zambia, several other regional colleges offer further education in teaching, mid-wifery, nursing, farmers- and skills training. In the 1970s the Swedish government aid agency SIDA founded ZCA (Zambia College for Agriculture).

== See also ==
- Transport in Zambia
