= Kafue =

Town in Lusaka Province, Zambia

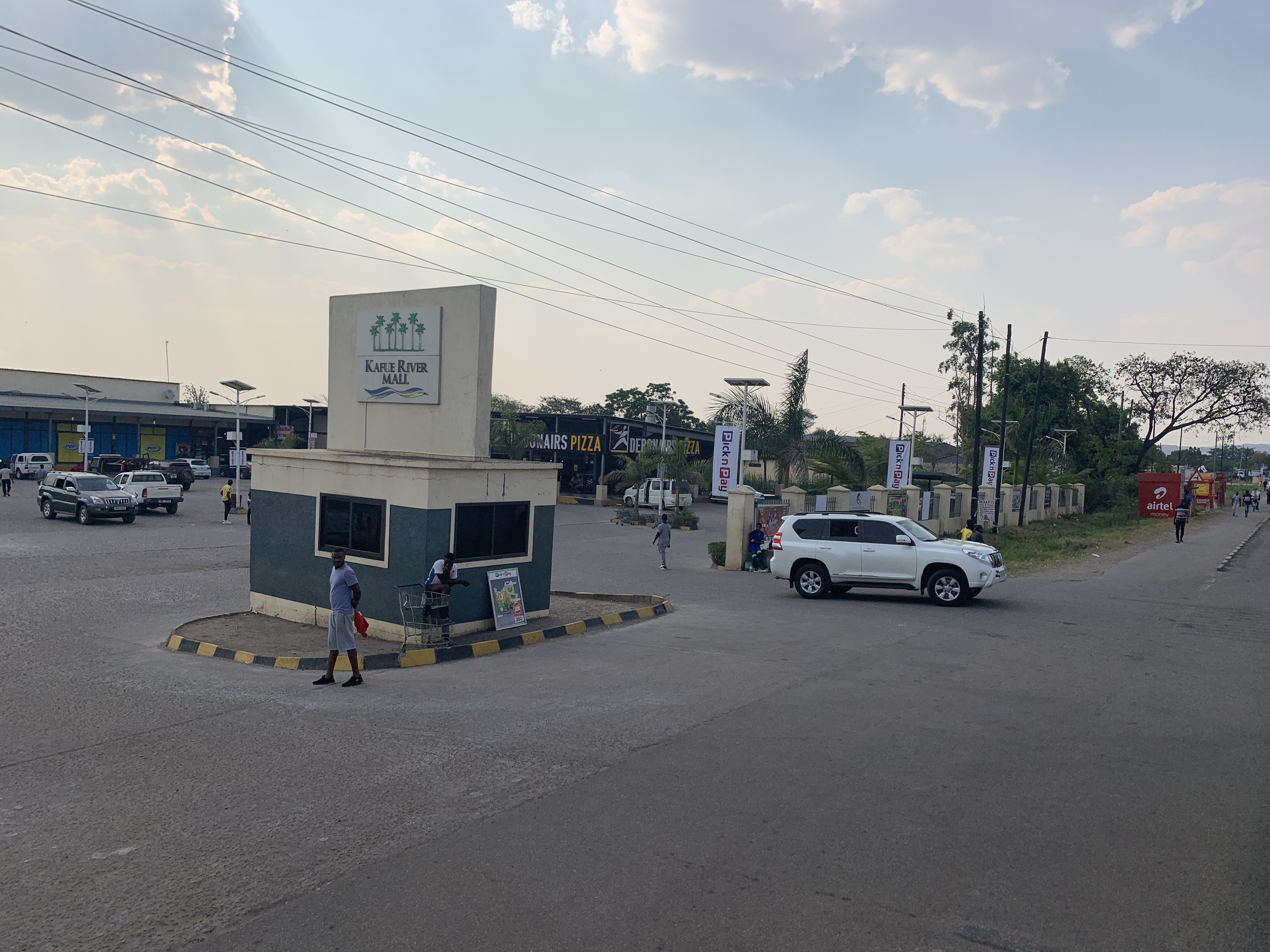

- Location in Zambia
- Coordinates: 15°46′S 28°11′E
- Country: Zambia
- Province: Lusaka Province
- District: Kafue District
- Elevation: 3,307 ft (1,008 m)

Population (2010)
  - City: 219,000
  - Urban: 131,293
- Climate: Cwa

Kafue is a town on the T2 road in the Lusaka Province of Zambia and it lies on the north bank of the Kafue River, after which it is named. It is the southern gateway to the central Zambian plateau on which Lusaka and the mining towns of Kabwe and the Copperbelt are located.

== Site ==
Kafue is at the south-eastern foot of a range of granite hills rising 200 m and extending over an area of about 250 km², and occupies a shelf of land between the hills and the river, just high enough to avoid its annual flood. The town extends along some shallow valleys between the hills. A 400 m wide strip of small farms and gardens separates the town from a bend of the river which is about 300 m wide in the dry season and 1.3 km wide in the rainy season, sometimes inundating a floodplain 10 km wide on the opposite bank, which consequently is uninhabited save for a few small villages or farms on higher ground.

== History ==
During World War II, 25 Polish refugees escaping from German- and Soviet-occupied Poland, were admitted in Kafue in 1941.

== Transport links ==
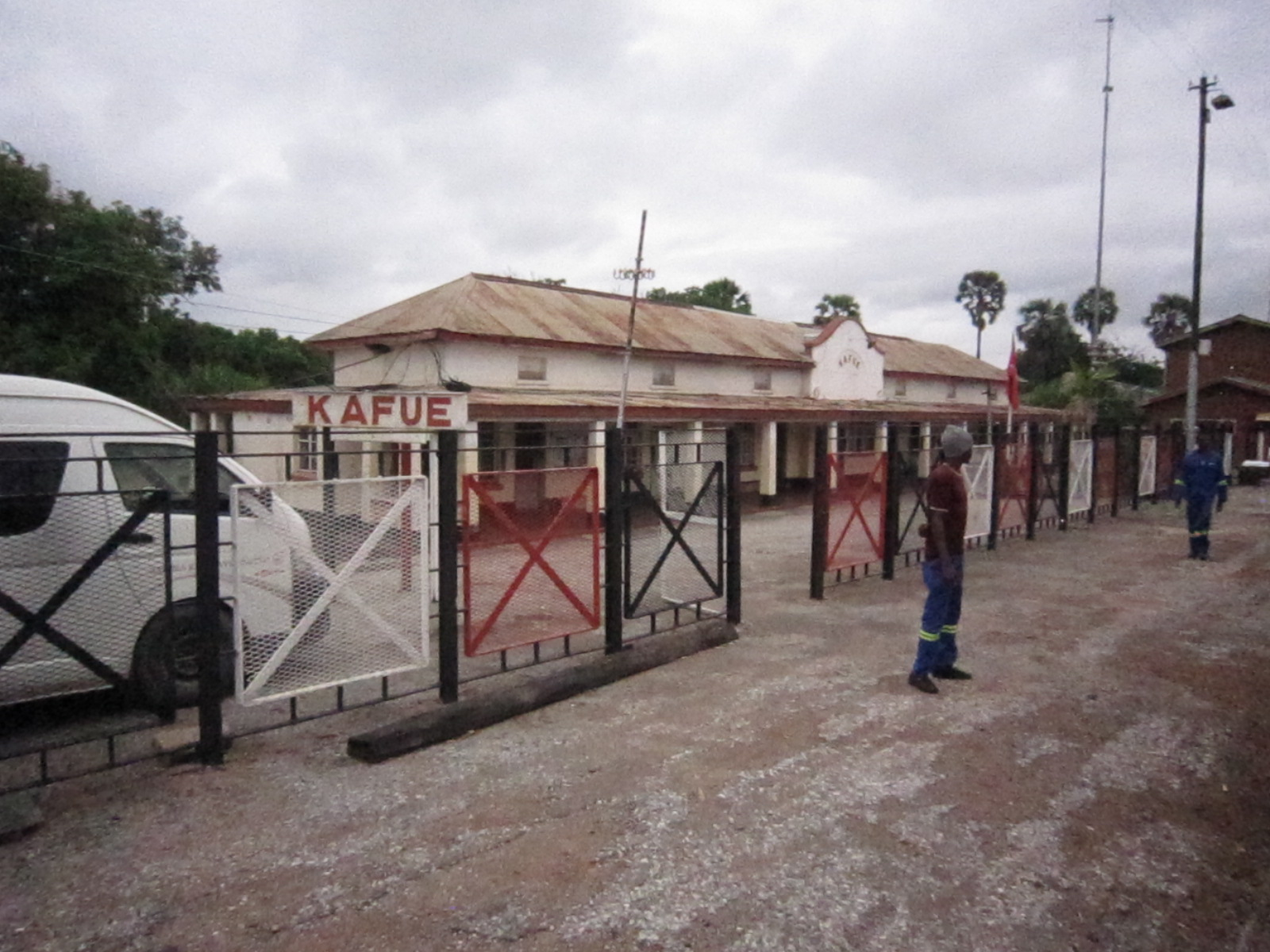
Kafue Railway Station

The Kafue River's 50 km wide floodplain, the Kafue Flats, is a 240 km long east-west barrier to road and rail connections between the centre of the country and the south. Kafue lies at the eastern end of the floodplain where the river enters the Kafue Gorge and flows down the Zambezi Escarpment into the middle Zambezi rift valley. Consequently, it's strategically located at the only place where north-south road and rail can easily cross the Kafue River and squeeze through the gap between floodplain and escarpment. The Kafue Railway Bridge on the Lusaka–Livingstone line is at the south end of the town, and the Kafue Bridge 9 km to south-east carries one of the busiest sections of the T2 road across the river and brings it through the town, from where it continues 50 km north to Lusaka. In the other direction the road connects to the Zimbabwe border at the Chirundu Bridge, and the main southern highway to Livingstone, Botswana and Namibia branches off it just south of the Kafue Bridge.

The river is not used for commercial water transport. To the west it is too shallow and meandering and does not go near any centres of population, to the east is not navigable due to the Kafue Gorge and dam. However, subsistence fishing and recreational boating and sports fishing takes place on a 60 km stretch of the river above the dam.

== Population ==
According to the 2010 Zambia Census of Population and Housing, Kafue has a total population of 219,000 of which 108,939 are males and 110,061 are females.

== Religion ==
Among people aged 15 years and above, 73.11% are Protestant, 11.08% belong to other religions, and 15.80% are not affiliated with any religion.

== Industry ==
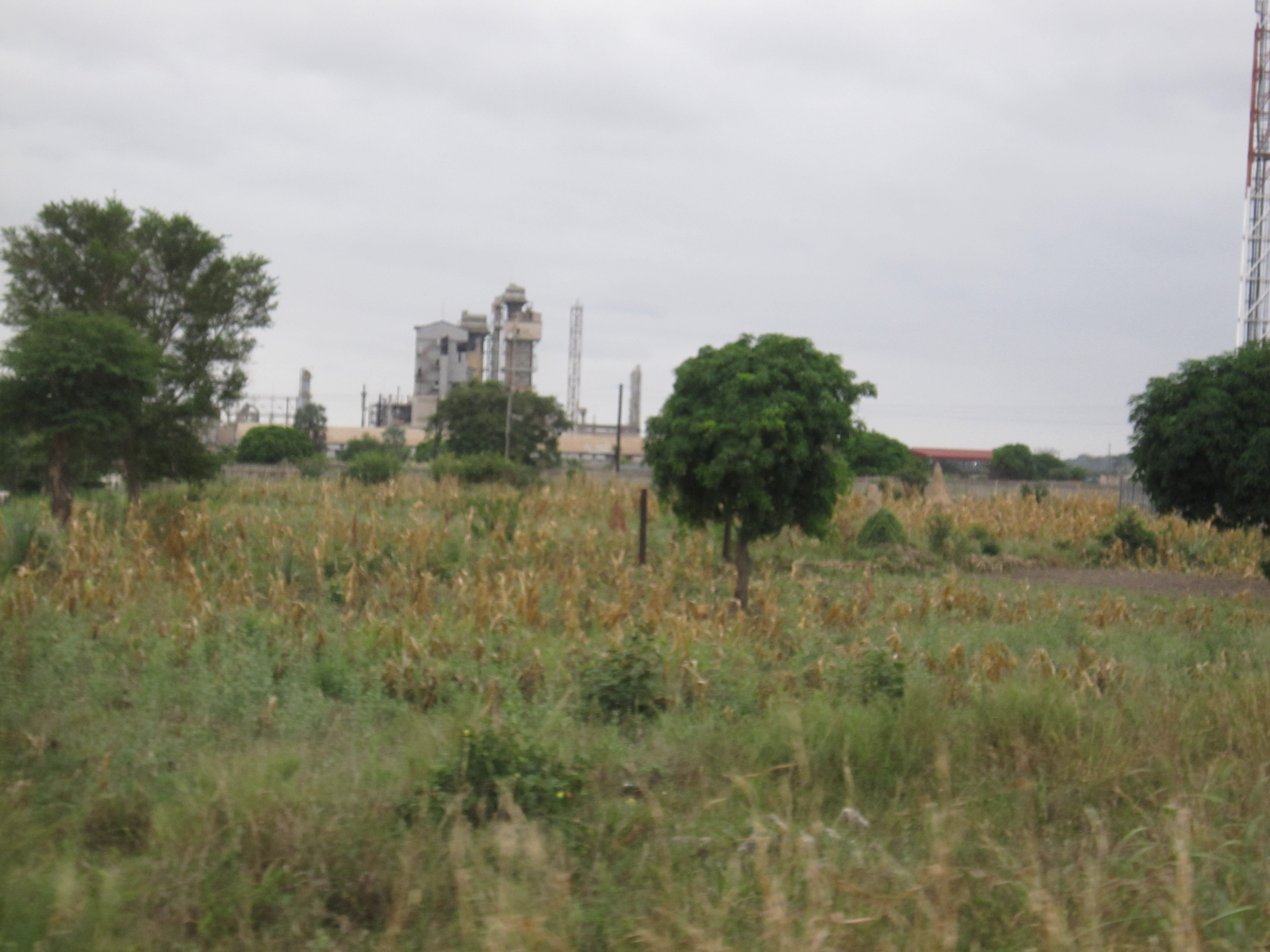
Nitrogen Chemicals at Kafue

Agriculture and fishing are the traditional occupations of the area, and a commercial farming area extends along the edge of the Kafue Flats for 35 km north-west of the town. Commercial fishing operations of any size are limited to fish farming. Kafue has a larger proportion of manufacturing industries compared to most of the towns outside the Copperbelt Province.The Town has an industrial estate with housing and services called Kafue Estates. The industries in Kafue include;

- Nitrogen Chemicals of Zambia (Agricultural fertilisers)
- Bata Tannery (shoe leather) - No longer operational.
- Textiles - Kafue Textiles - No longer operational.
- UNIVERSAL Mining and Chemical Industries Limited (UMCIL), Kafue integrated Iron and Steel plant (Direct Reduced Iron). Phase one of the project was completed in 2007 and is now fully operational, producing 7,000 tonnes of finished rolled iron and steel products per month for the local and regional markets.
- Lee Yeast Zambia - The Sole manufacturer of baking yeast (and other baking products) in Zambia.
- Alliance Ginnery Zambia - Cotton Ginning company.
- Fens Zambia - Manufacturer of spray race equipment and commercial trailers.
- Kafue River Cliff - A modern 4 star Hotel located on the banks of the Kafue River operated by the LSA group.

Other industries in or near the town:

- Kafue Fisheries Ltd was first established in 1981 with a five hectare project pilot scheme. Over the years, the project has grown to its present size of 60 hectare ponds and is situated in the centre of 1800 hectare wildlife and cattle scheme. The whole aquaculture system is based on an integrated pig and fish enterprise with annual production of Tilapia exceeding 700 tonnes and 4000 pigs of the ‘heavy hog’ class.
- Kafue Quarry produces construction aggregate for road building and general construction. The firm has been together with Nitrogen Chemicals and Kafue Textiles (no longer in operation) a source of employment for the district for a number of years.
- Kafue Gorge Upper Power Station (990 megawatts (1,330,000 hp) generation capacity) operated by the Zambia Electricity Supply Company (ZESCO) generates hydroelectricity 30 kilometres (19 mi) downstream from the town, and at the end of the rainy season its reservoir extends back to the town.

=== Kafue Bulk Water Supply Project (KBWSP) ===
Kafue Bulk Water Supply Project (KBWSP)
Estimated Cost	Funded by	Project Details	Construction Start	Commercial Operation Date
US$ 150.0 million	EXIM Bank of China and Zambian Government to contribute US$ 13.8 million (ZMW 225.0 million)	50 million Litres per Day Water treatment plant, 66 kilometre treated water main pipeline from Kafue to Lusaka and a booster pump station in Chilanga.	July 2022	TBA
