= Tunduma =

Border town in Songwe Region, Tanzania

Coordinates: 09°18′00″S 32°46′00″E

Tunduma is a city in Songwe Region, Tanzania, on the border between Tanzania and Zambia. It has border posts for both the Tanzam Highway and the TAZARA railway (for which it has a station) linking the two countries. It is located 103 km southwest of Mbeya. It is also the junction for the tarmac road which runs via Sumbawanga through the remote far western districts of Tanzania to Kasulu and Kibondo in the north-west. According to the 2022 census, it has a population of 219,309. Tunduma can be the most famous border city within SADCC countries and is informally known as the 'gateway to East Africa' with the neighbouring country of Zambia. Nakonde is immediately across the border in Zambia.
