= Tanzam Highway =

Highway from Lusaka, Zambia to Dar es Salaam, Tanzania

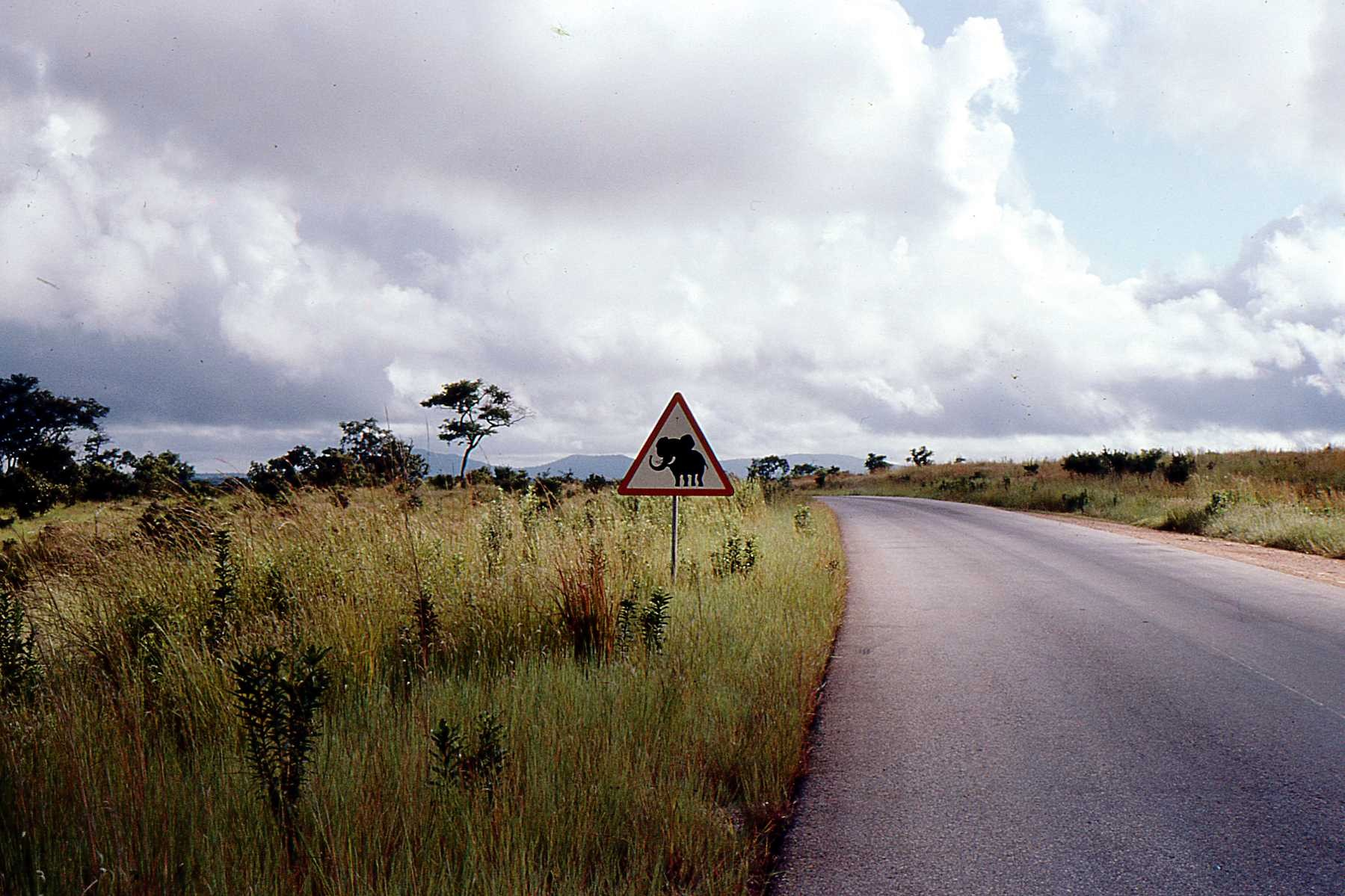
Tanzam Highway in Mikumi National Park

T1 route (yellow) in Tanzania

The Tanzam Highway leads from Lusaka in Zambia to Dar es Salaam in Tanzania. The highway was built from 1968 to 1973 in several stages and was intended to provide seaport access for Zambia and to expand the transport options for Zambia, Malawi and the then Zaire (now Democratic Republic of the Congo).

== Description ==
The Tanzam Highway is about 1950 km long and is paved. The road leads largely through very mountainous areas to an altitude of over 2000 m. It starts in Dar es Salaam, the largest city of Tanzania, and passes through the regions of Coast, Morogoro, Iringa, Njombe, Mbeya and Songwe. The highway crosses the Mikumi National Park between Morogoro and Iringa. The entire Zambian section of the route is named the Great North Road and is marked T2; in Tanzania it bears the label T1.

In the vicinity of Iringa, the highway passes by the site of a battle near Ilula-Lugalo, where a monument commemorates the defeat of the German colonial troops on the Hehe on 17 August 1891.

In Zambia, the Great North Road crosses the Kapiri Mposhi and Nakonde areas. The distance between Nakonde and Kapiri Mposhi is approximately 832 km.

Within Tanzania, the Tanzam Highway connects with four major routes:

- in Chalinze, the main road to Tanga and to Kilimanjaro, Arusha and Nairobi
- in Morogoro, the road to Dodoma in the west, then to Singida, Tabora, Mpanda, Shinyanga, Bariadi, Geita, Mwanza, Musoma, Bukoba and Kigoma
- in Makambako there is a road up to Songea, going on to Mtwara
- Uyole/Mbeya is on the road to Malawi through Tukuyu, Rungwe and Kasumulu, Kyela.

West from Makambako, Tanzam frequently runs parallel to the TAZARA Railway.

This road is the main link between East Africa and Southern Africa.

== Significance ==
During the apartheid era in South Africa and the civil wars in Angola and Mozambique, this highway, together with the TAZARA Railway, provided Zambia's only safe access to a seaport (Dar Es Salaam), which was a prerequisite for the survival of the Zambian economy.
