= Mailoni brothers =

Zambian serial killer trio killed in 2013

The Mailoni Brothers were a trio of serial killers and gang members in Zambia, consisting of brothers, Mika, Stephano, and Fabian, alias Tunda. They were suspected to be behind a number of murders around the Luano Valley of Central Province and were on the run for a number of years. They were gunned down and killed by a team of Zambia Army Commandos in 2013. They were stated as officially having killed 12 people since the start of their crime spree on April 27, 2007.

== Early life ==
The brothers were born to mother Janet Njimu and an unnamed father (who died in 1986 of unknown causes), the exact details of their conceptions and birthdays being uncertain.

Raised in Luano Valley during their childhoods and suffering from illiteracy with dreams of becoming successful entrepreneurs, the three abruptly embarked on a 6-year-long murder spree for reasons that are still unknown. At the time of their deaths, Mika was 35 years old, Fabian was 31, and Stephano was 27, placing their dates of birth between 1978 and 1986. The trio had another brother, Nelson, who was the sole surviving son of Janet in the aftermath of the murders. According to Janet, the brothers' first violent altercation was against their own brother, Nelson, who was beaten by the brothers.

Before the beginning of the murder spree, Tunda had married a woman, Eredina Mondoka, in 1997 and had four children: Mwape, Miniver, Christine, and an unnamed son who was born between the births of Miniver and Christine. According to Eredina, he "slept with an axe and a sword and he would leave the house in middle of night" and "when I asked him, he would beat me up saying I am a Satanist,". After their divorce in 2007 and at the beginning of the brothers' murder spree, the brothers raided Eredina's home and murdered her father, Rabson Mondoka.

== Murders ==
According to their mother, the brothers’ first victim was a man only identified as “Mr. Mwelwa”, who was stabbed to death after attempting to mobilize the villagers and apprehend the brothers when they started to pose as a threat to others.

Terrorizing the Mkushi-Serenje area of Luano Valley, the brothers’ victim count rose over the years to the point where their mother was forced to flee to Kawasaki Village (just outside of Kabwe) for fear of her own safety with the looming threat of assassination attempts aimed at her, but not before being whisked away by police after angry residents of the village set her house ablaze. Janet later quoted that one of the people who set her house on fire was eventually captured and imprisoned.

== Victims ==
Listed in no particular order:

- Mr. Mwelwa (real name potentially "Roy Mondoka"), the brothers' first victim who attempted to apprehend the brothers. Killed 21 May 2007
- Watson Kashanga, killed 10 June 2009
- Rabson (also called Lapson) Mondoka, Tunda's wife's father
- Mathews Musonda, killed 26 October 2009
- Lackson Njinga, killed 8 April 2010
- Moses Masumba, Zambia Flying Doctor Services chief pilot. Killed 4 May 2010
- Atesai Washama, killed 31 May 2010
- Pensulu Mutolwa, killed 12 June 2010
- Blandini Isaki, killed 15 June 2010
- Christopher Nyama Champe, advisor to the chief of Shimpupula Village
- Mbalakawe Chipokolo, headman (chief) of Shitambeni Village
- Darius Chinika, 43-year-old man who was the last victim of the brothers

== Deaths ==
On the afternoon of 24 June 2013, Corporal Joe Shapela of the Chindwin Barracks in Kabwe was asked by villagers to assist them near the banks of the crocodile-infested Lunsemfwa River. After noticing fresh footprints and a camp with a billowing fire in the distance, Corporal Shapela and the villagers spotted Mika and Stephano at the campsite. After confirming that the two were a part of the most-wanted trio in the country, the Zambian Army opened fire on the campsite, killing all three of the brothers. Tunda was the last of the brothers to die after sprinting at an officer despite being wounded in the leg and was subsequently gunned down and killed. His final words were allegedly “Mwatushitisha” (“You have sold us out”), which was aimed towards the villagers for directing the army towards their hideout.

The bodies were immediately identified as the Mailoni brothers, first by village chief Ngosa Chibale (whom the brothers had once attempted to kill), and later by Central Province Police Chief Standwell Lungu.

Yes, I can confirm that the Mailoni brothers are no more. We have positively identified the bodies, they are in Kabwe General Mortuary. I’m just leaving the mortuary now as we are speaking.

— Police Chief Standwell Lungu.

A soldier who assisted in the killings of the brothers quoted anonymously,

What led us to unleash a bloody death was when we first shot, something mysterious started happening, they started changing into something else like wild animals but we just got courage and shot continuously.

Police later announced that one of the brothers was found to be wearing a pair of shoes that once belonged to one of their victims, Moses Masumba.

The three brothers were buried in Kabwe.

== Aftermath ==
After the deaths and burials of three of her four sons, Janet, along with Nelson, remained in Kawasaki Village until Kabwe lawyer Millio Kabesha and his wife Rachael gifted a brand-new house to Janet and Nelson.

Eredina Mondoka fled Luano Valley as well and relocated her family in Kapiri Mposhi.

Corporal Joe Shapela, along with 40 other soldiers, were publicly honored by President Michael Sata for their roles in the brothers' demise.

District Commissioner Patrick Chishala publicly addressed the nation, asking them to accept the remaining Mailoni family members, pleading to “accept the mother and family members because they could not be punished for crimes they did not commit considering those involved in the acts were no more”.

In an interview with the media, Janet expressed her belief that the brothers’ behavior was caused by being possessed by evil spirits after visiting a witch doctor. She claimed that, some years ago, one of the brothers visited a witch doctor after falling ill and having his brothers accompany him to the meeting, all of their behaviors “changed”.

On 31 July 2013, it was announced that catapults, spears, and other items used by the brothers during their murder spree were to be donated to the Lusaka National Museum.

In 2018, a research headed by Alice Saladini set out to prove whether or not the brothers used witchcraft to commit their murders and to elude authorities. The research ended in the conclusion that the brothers did not, in fact, use witchcraft in their murders, but gave way to the theory that the brothers went on their murder spree simply by their desire to rule Luano Valley and to be feared by the people in the area.

== In popular culture ==
In 2017, a movie based on the story of the brothers titled The Mailoni Brothers directed by Hicks Yamba was released.
