= Kapiri Mposhi District =

Coordinates: 14°05′S 28°31′E

- District
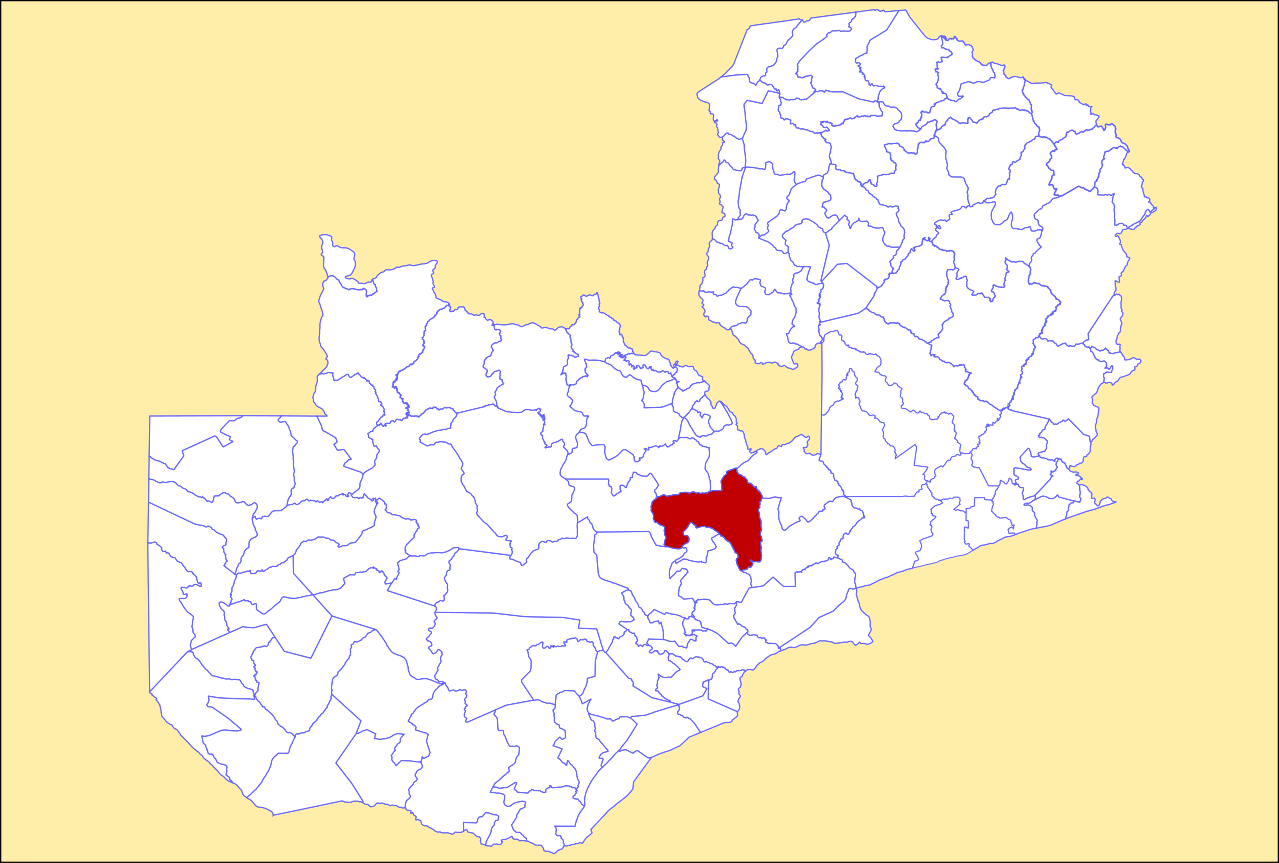
- District location in Zambia
- Country: Zambia
- Province: Central Province
- Capital: Kapiri Mposhi

Government
  - Mr: M Sydney

Area
  - Total: 9,688.2 km^{2} (3,740.6 sq mi)

Population (2022)
  - Total: 371,068
  - Density: 38.301/km^{2} (99.199/sq mi)
- Time zone: UTC+2 (CAT)

Kapiri Mposhi District is a district of Zambia, located in Central Province. The capital lies at Kapiri Mposhi. As of the 2022 Zambian Census, the district had a population of 371,068 people.

== Geography ==
The district borders with Copperbelt Province and with the districts of Chibombo, Chisamba, Kabwe, Luano, Masaiti, Mkushi, Mpongwe and Ngabwe.

=== Municipalities ===
It was composed by 14 municipalities as of 2010:

Municipality	Pop. (2010)
Kapiri Mposhi	14,792
Chango'ndo	23,935
Chibwelo	44,783
Chipepo	14,323
Kakwelesa	25,556
Kampumba	6,080
Kapandwe	3,852
Kashitu	7,506
Lunchu	32,138
Lwanchele	15,117
Mpunde	25,832
Mushimbili	18,634
Mukumbwe	15,546
Ngabwe	5,692

== See also ==
- Kapiri Mposhi (Zambian National Assembly constituency)
