= Lusaka–Mongu Road =

Road in Zambia

Lusaka–Mongu Road

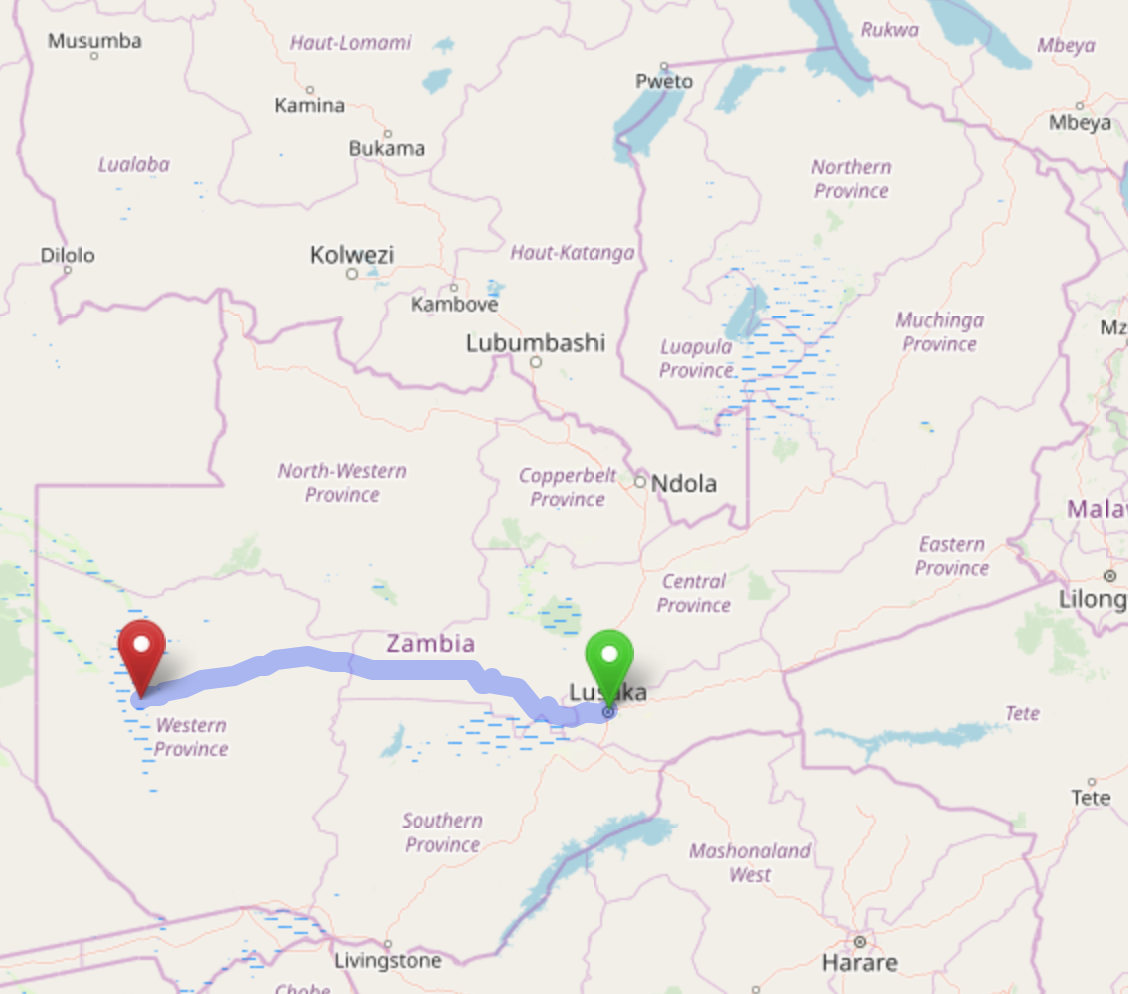
- Map showing the Lusaka–Mongu Road through Zambia

Route information
- Length: 584 km (363 mi)
- Existed: 1969–present

Major junctions
- East end: T2 / T4 in Lusaka
- D809 connecting with the M20 in Mumbwa
- West end: M10 in Mongu

Location
- Country: Zambia
- Provinces: Lusaka, Central, Western
- Major cities: Lusaka, Mumbwa, Kaoma, Mongu

Highway system
- Transport in Zambia
← M8	→ M10

The Lusaka–Mongu Road of Zambia runs 580 km from the capital, Lusaka, to Mongu, capital of the Western Province. It connects that province to the rest of the country, as well as being one of two routes to the south-west extremity of North-Western Province. It also serves as the main highway of the western half of Central Province. The entire route from Lusaka to Mongu is designated as the M9 road.

Road development was slower to start in the west of the country than in other parts. A dirt road was built from the Great North Road at Landless Corner to Mumbwa in the early 1930s (today designated as the M20 and now known as the "Old Mumbwa Road"), but was not extended to Kaoma and Mongu until 1937, about ten years after road transport started in other provinces. This road to Mongu did not have the same recognition and maintenance as the better-known Great North Road and Great East Road, and was also for a time only the third most used route to the west. A route by ox wagon and boat up the Zambezi from Livingstone was the most used in the first decades of the 20th century. A road was made from Mululwe, the end of the Mulobezi Railway, along the banks of the Luampa River and then across the sandy plain to Mongu about the same time that this road was built and, thanks to the railway, was used more, until the 1950s.

The first Lusaka-Mongu Road was a dirt road with pontoon ferries across rivers such as the Kafue. It passed through only two towns: Mumbwa and Kaoma. The first 100 km passed through farmland and bush north of the Kafue Flats and like the middle section crossing the Kafue National Park, was constructed with laterite gravel. Most of the last third passes through virtually uninhabited bush with no streams or rivers. It is completely dry except after rain in the wet season and is very sandy, which took its toll on trucks and their drivers, as vehicles could get bogged in sand in the dry season, in addition to the usual rainy season hazards of floods and washed-out sections.

The fact that the road started at Landless Corner, 69 km north of Lusaka, suited traffic to and from the Copperbelt. Lusaka did not become the capital of the country until about the time the road was built (1935) and it was not until the late 1940s that it became an important centre. A shortcut to Lusaka from Mumbwa via Nakachenje was built around this time.

This road was first paved around 1969, to a new alignment which, controversially for the residents of those towns, bypassed Mumbwa and Kaoma by a few kilometres. The Nakachenje branch was paved a little later. A lack of maintenance through the late 1970s and 1980s meant that by the 1990s the pavement of the road from Landless Corner was in bad condition and had lost in some sections. The Nakachenje branch was in better condition and became accepted as being the main road to the west while the Landless Corner to Mumbwa section was neglected, and by 2005, was a poor dirt road.

== Route ==
=== M20 Road ("Old Mumbwa Road") ===
M20 Road

Route information
- Length: 120 km (75 mi)

Major junctions
- East end: T2 (Great North Road) at Landless Corner
- West end: M9/D809/D180 in Mumbwa

Location
- Country: Zambia
- Provinces: Central
- Major cities: Mumbwa

Highway system
- Transport in Zambia
← M19

The older route, from the Landless Corner junction with the T2 road (Great North Road) in Chibombo District (70 kilometres north of Lusaka; 20 kilometres south of Chibombo) westwards to Mumbwa is designated as the M20 in Zambia's road network. It is 116 kilometres in length up to Mumbwa Central and is in poor condition, with motorists having the impression that the road is really not being properly maintained.

=== M9 Road ===
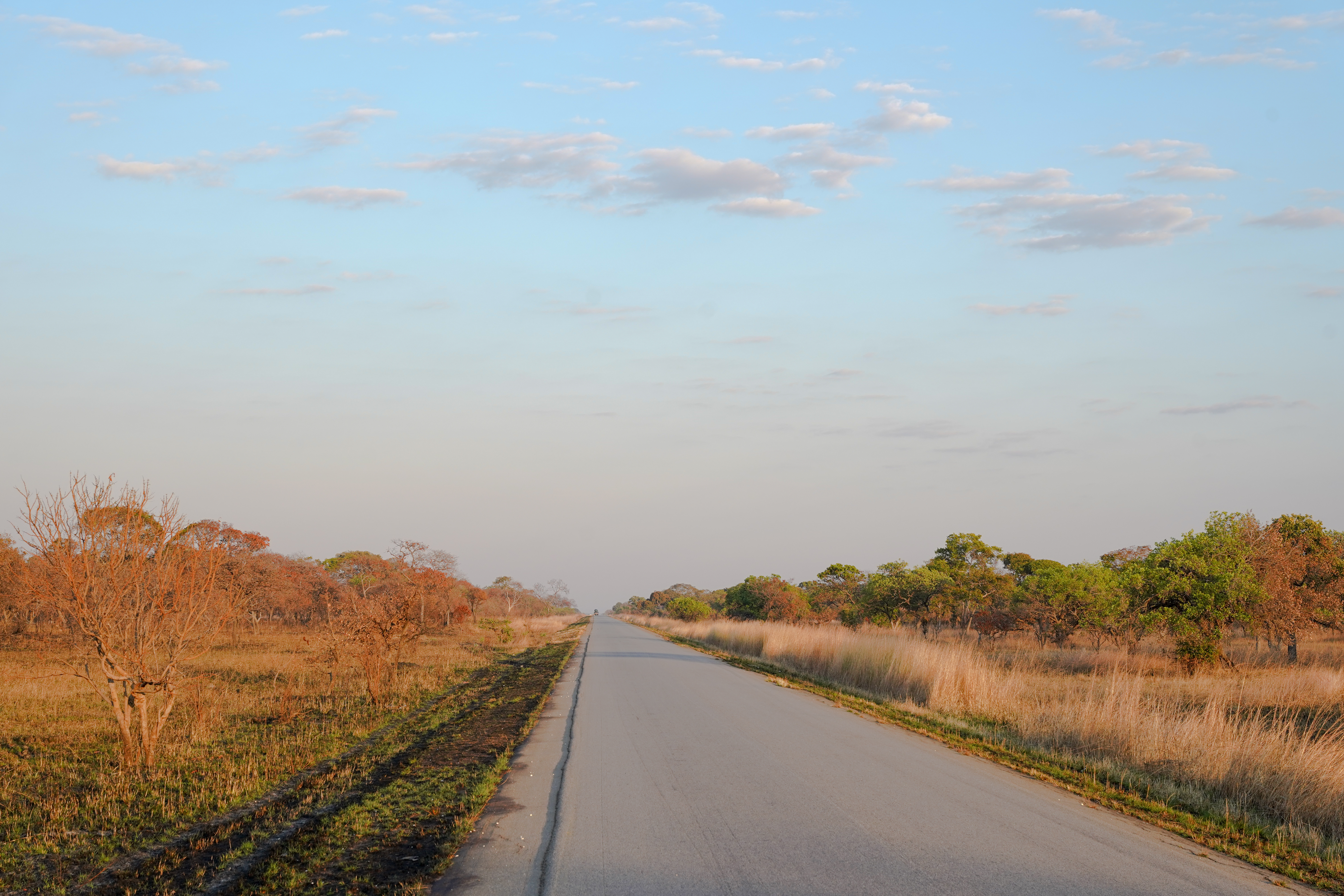
M9 heading west in Mumbwa Game Management Area (GMA)

The newer route from Lusaka (Capital City) is designated as the M9. It begins at the Kabwe Roundabout junction with the T2 (Great North Road; Cairo Road) and the T4 (Great East Road). It heads westwards as Kalambo Road up to the junction with Lumumba Road. It then becomes Lumumba Road southwards up to its junction with Mumbwa Road, where it becomes Mumbwa Road westwards. It continues as a single road of 580 kilometers for the remainder of its length.

The road heads west from the Lusaka city centre for 150 kilometres, passing through the northern part of Chilanga District (Mwembeshi), entering Central Province at Nakachenje and passing through Shibuyunji District, encountering the Mumbwa Toll Plaza, to bypass Mumbwa to the south. South-west of Mumbwa, the M9 connects to the M20 road (the old route from Landless Corner) via the D809.

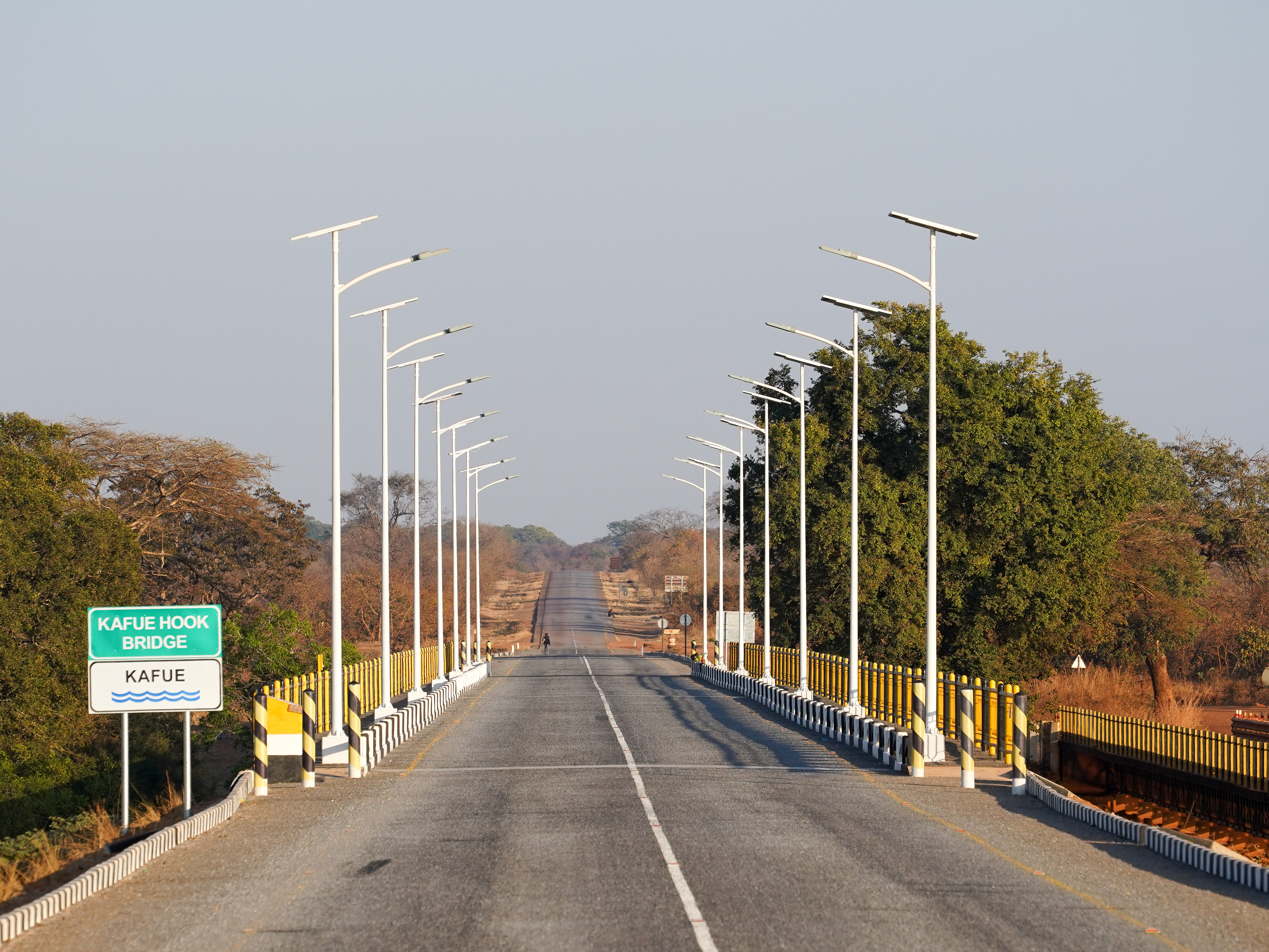
Kafue Hook Bridge, view to west

From Mumbwa, the M9 goes west for 130 kilometres as Mongu Road to cross the Kafue River as the Kafue Hook Bridge and enter the central area of the Kafue National Park north of the town of Itezhi-Tezhi. It continues for another 120 kilometres, entering Western Province and passing through Nkeyema District, to reach the town of Kaoma, which it bypasses to the south (the D301 provides access to the town centre).

From Kaoma, the road goes west for 200 kilometres, through the Mweeke Toll Plaza, to the town of Mongu (capital of the Western Province and Barotseland), where it ends at a roundabout intersection with the M10 road (which is coming from Senanga and the Namibia Border in the south) and the D315 road (which is coming from Limulunga in the north) adjacent to Barotse Shopping Mall.

== Westwards extension ==
An ambitious project, the Barotse Floodplain causeway was started in 2002 to extend the road from Mongu to Kalabo on a 46-kilometre causeway across the Barotse Floodplain, via the ferry across the Zambezi's main channel at Sandaula, which would then be replaced by a 500-metre bridge. Originally intended to be completed in 2006, it has been delayed by technical problems of building on the floodplain, and consequent funding problems. The long term intention is to then continue the highway into Angola and to connect with its road network as a new trade route for Zambia to Atlantic Ocean ports. This road to Angola is being created so that the road could finally rival the Great East Road and the Great North Road in Zambia's network.

The road was constructed by AVIC International (Aviation Industry Corporation of China) and as of 2016, the road over the Barotse Floodplain has been completed, connecting Mongu and Kalabo by road. It consists of 26 bridges crossing the floodplain.

On 6 October 2024, it was reported that Zambia had signed a $50 million cooperation agreement with the Arab Bank for Economic Development in Africa (ABEDA) for the construction of the road from Kalabo westwards through Sikongo to the border with Angola. The Minister of Finance (Situmbeko Musokotwane) stated that trade will improve between Zambia and Angola, as the project aligns with Zambia's Sustainable Development Goals (SDGs) and with Africa's Agenda 2063.

=== Route ===
While the M9 from Lusaka ends at the roundabout-junction with the M10 road and the D315 road in Mongu, the road continuing westwards from Mongu is designated as the D819 on the Zambian road network. It goes westwards for 14 kilometres to the settlement named Lealui. From Lealui, the road continues westwards as the Barotse Floodplain Causeway for 34 kilometres, crossing the Lubosi Imwiko II Bridge, up until it reaches a junction with the RD319 road at the settlement of Lutwi. The RD319 road, which is coming from Kalongola (south of Senanga) in the south, is the road which goes northwards to Kalabo from this junction (22 kilometres), with a tollgate on this section (Tapo Toll Plaza). The total distance from Mongu to Kalabo is 70 kilometres. The road is to proceed westwards as the D316 from Kalabo to Sikongo, where the border into Angola is situated.

== See also ==
- Roads in Zambia
