= Chisamba =

- Town
- Location in Zambia
- Coordinates: 14°58′52″S 28°22′40″E
- Country: Zambia
- Province: Central Province
- District: Chisamba District
- Time zone: UTC+2 (CAT)
- Climate: Cwa

Chisamba is a small town located near Chibombo, in the Central Province of Zambia. It is located roughly 60 miles (97 km) north of Lusaka. In February 2013 a bus crash killed 53 people near Chisamba. The Protea Hotel Safari Lodge Hotel is located in Chisamba.

Chisamba, once part of Chibombo District, is now its own district. The town lies just off the Great North Road between Lusaka and Kabwe.
