= Kapiri Mposhi =

- Town
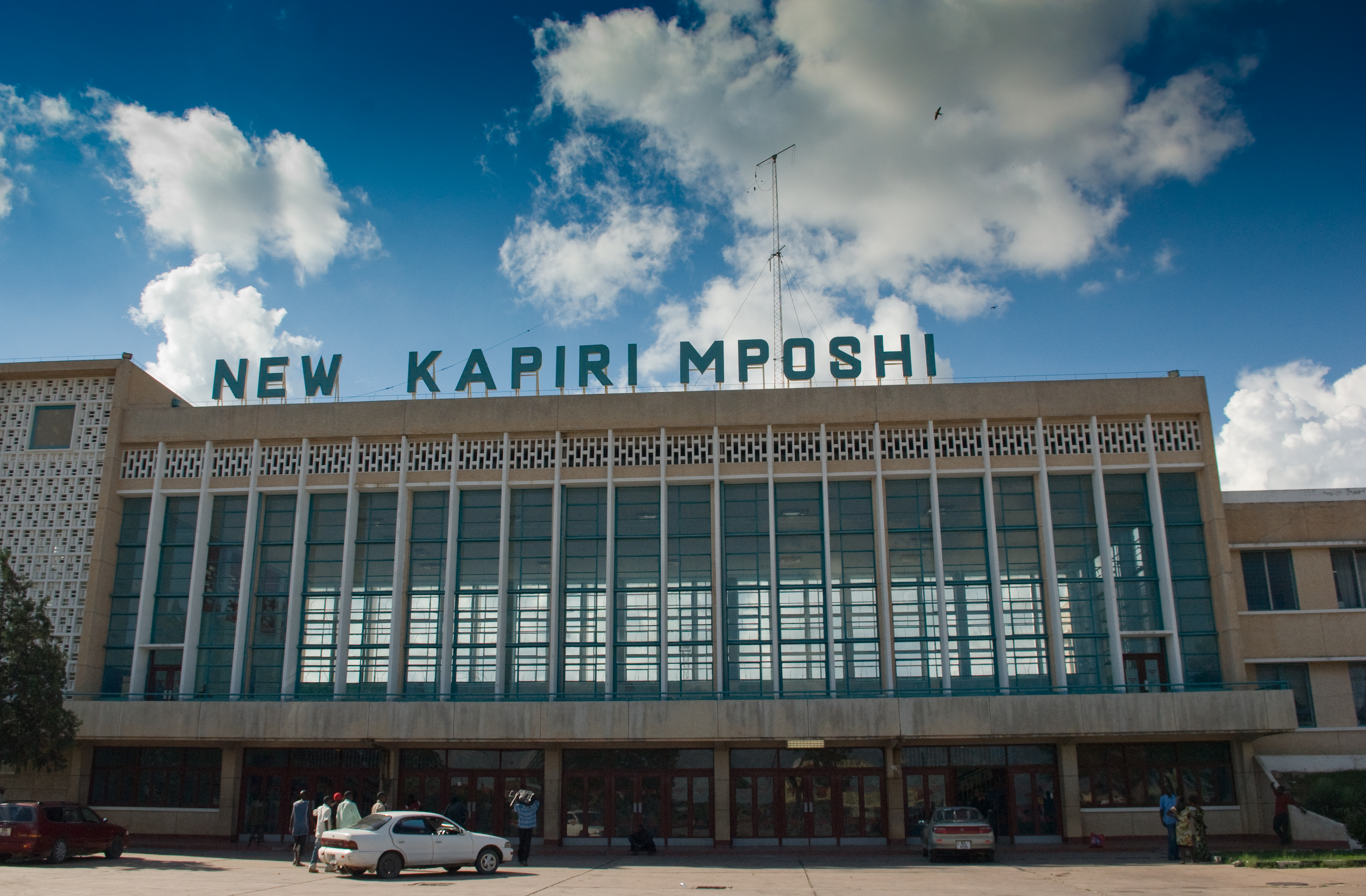
- TAZARA station

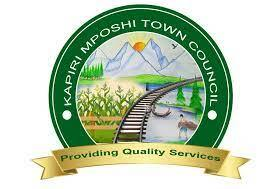
- Seal

- Location of Kapiri Mposhi in Zambia
- Coordinates: 13°58′38″S 28°41′5″E
- Country: Zambia
- Province: Central
- District: Kapiri Mposhi

Population (2010)
  - Total: 14,792
- Time zone: UTC+2 (CAT)
- Climate: Cwa

Kapiri Mposhi is a Zambian town and the seat of the Kapiri Mposhi District in Central Province. Located north of Lusaka, it stands on the Great North Road and is significant for the railway connection between the Zambia Railways line from Kitwe to Lusaka and the western terminus (New Kapiri Mposhi) of the Tanzania-Zambia Railway Authority from Dar es Salaam since 1976.

== Geography ==
=== Location ===
The town lies in the middle of Zambia, next to the boundary with Copperbelt Province.

The town is approximately 60 km north of Kabwe and 110 km south of Ndola.

It is surrounded by 8 districts, namely, Kabwe District to the south, Chisamba District to the south-east, Luano District on the east, Mkushi District on the north-east, Masaiti District to the north, Mpongwe District to the north-west, Ngabwe District to the west and Chibombo District to the south-west.

=== Transport ===
It is situated at the junction of the T2 road (Great North Road; which connects south to Kabwe and Lusaka and north-east to Mpika and Tanzania) and the T3 road (which connects north to Ndola, Kitwe, Chingola and the Democratic Republic Of Congo).

Kapiri Mposhi has two railways stations, the terminal station of the 1067 mm TAZARA Railway that connects it to Mpika, Kasama and Dar-es-Salaam in the north-east; and an en-route Zambia Railways station that connects it to Lusaka and Livingstone in the south and to Ndola and Kitwe in the north.

== Notable residents ==
Janny Sikazwe, association football referee.

== Gallery ==
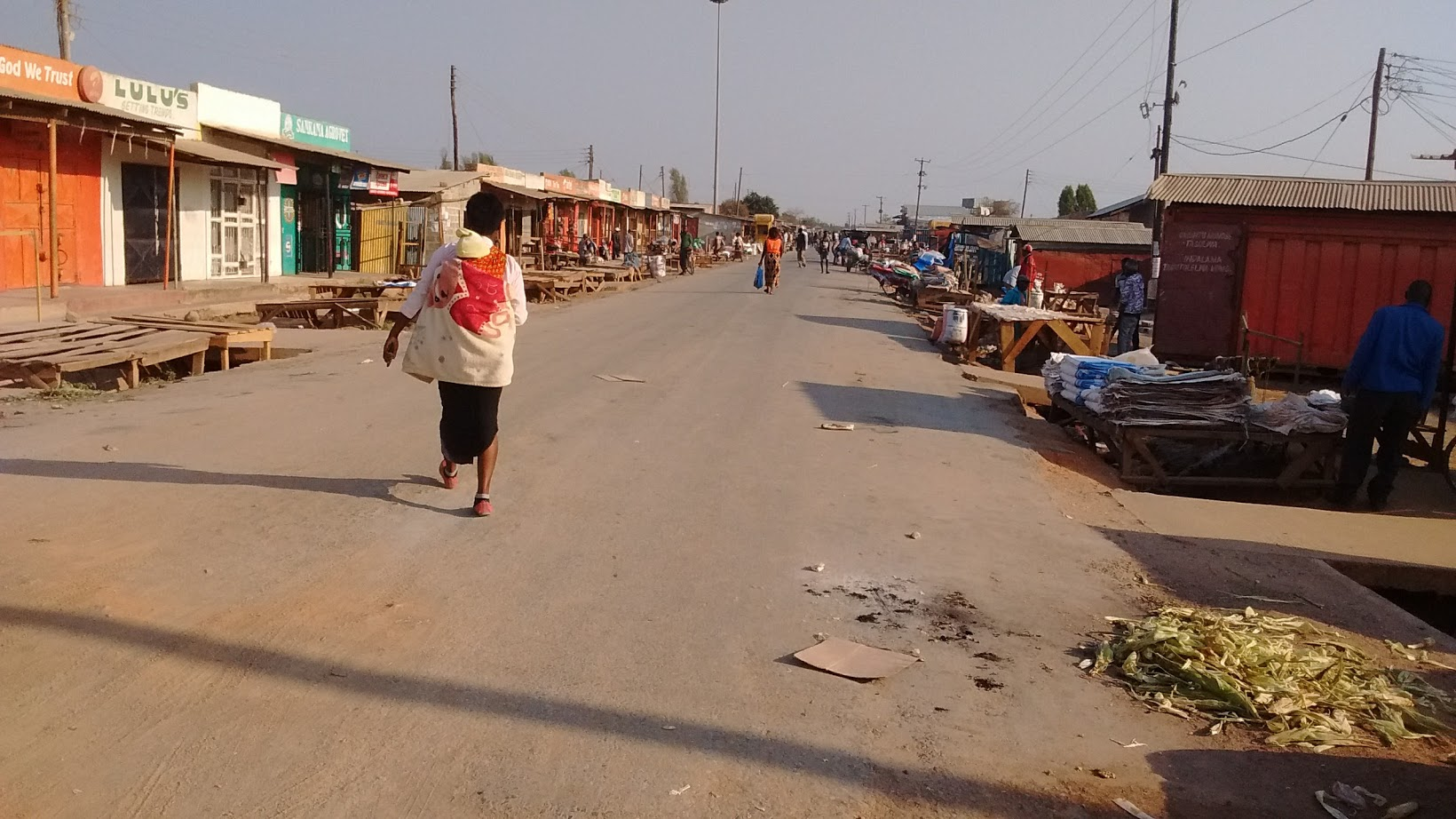
Market street

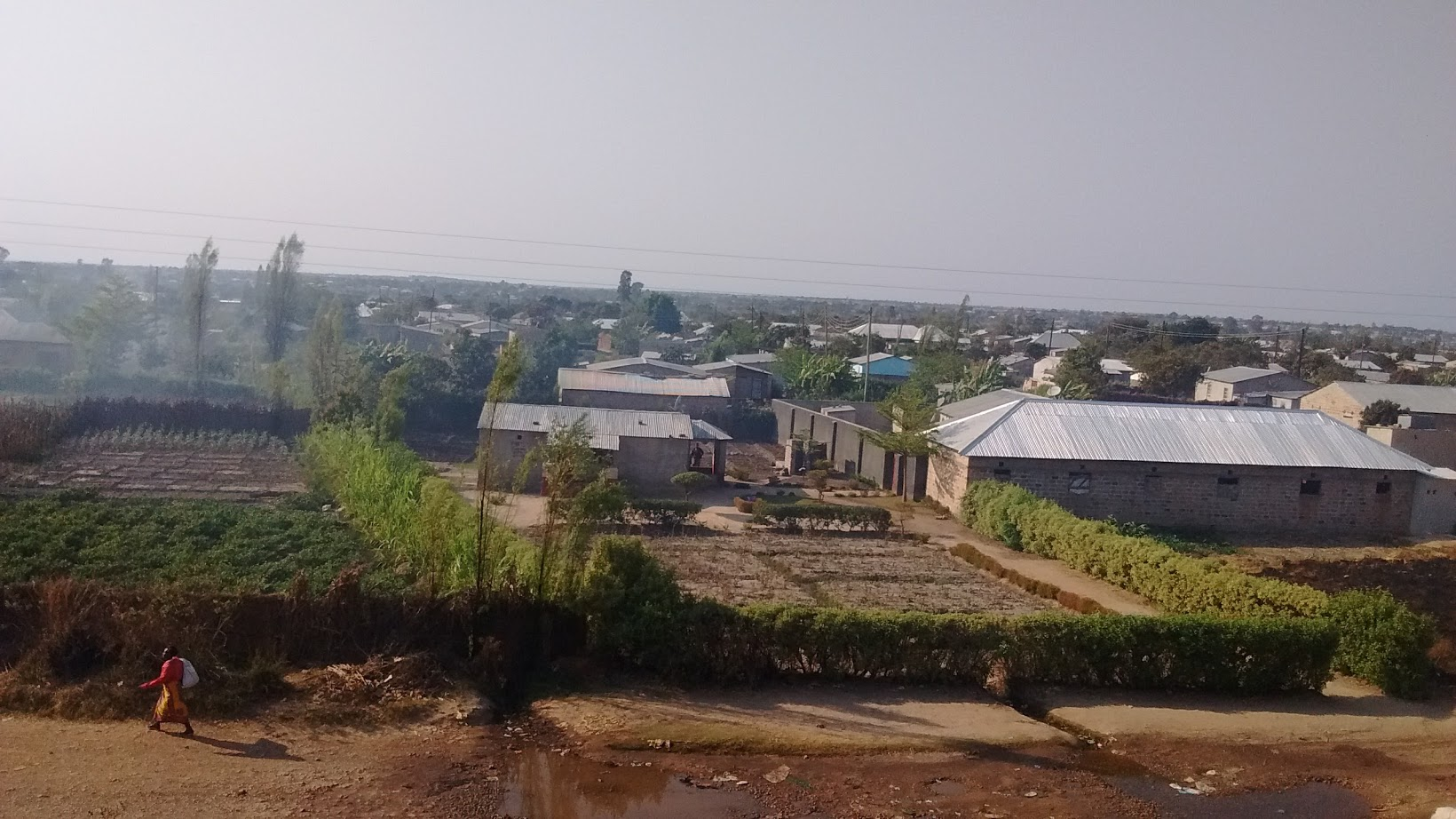
Panoramic view from the railway

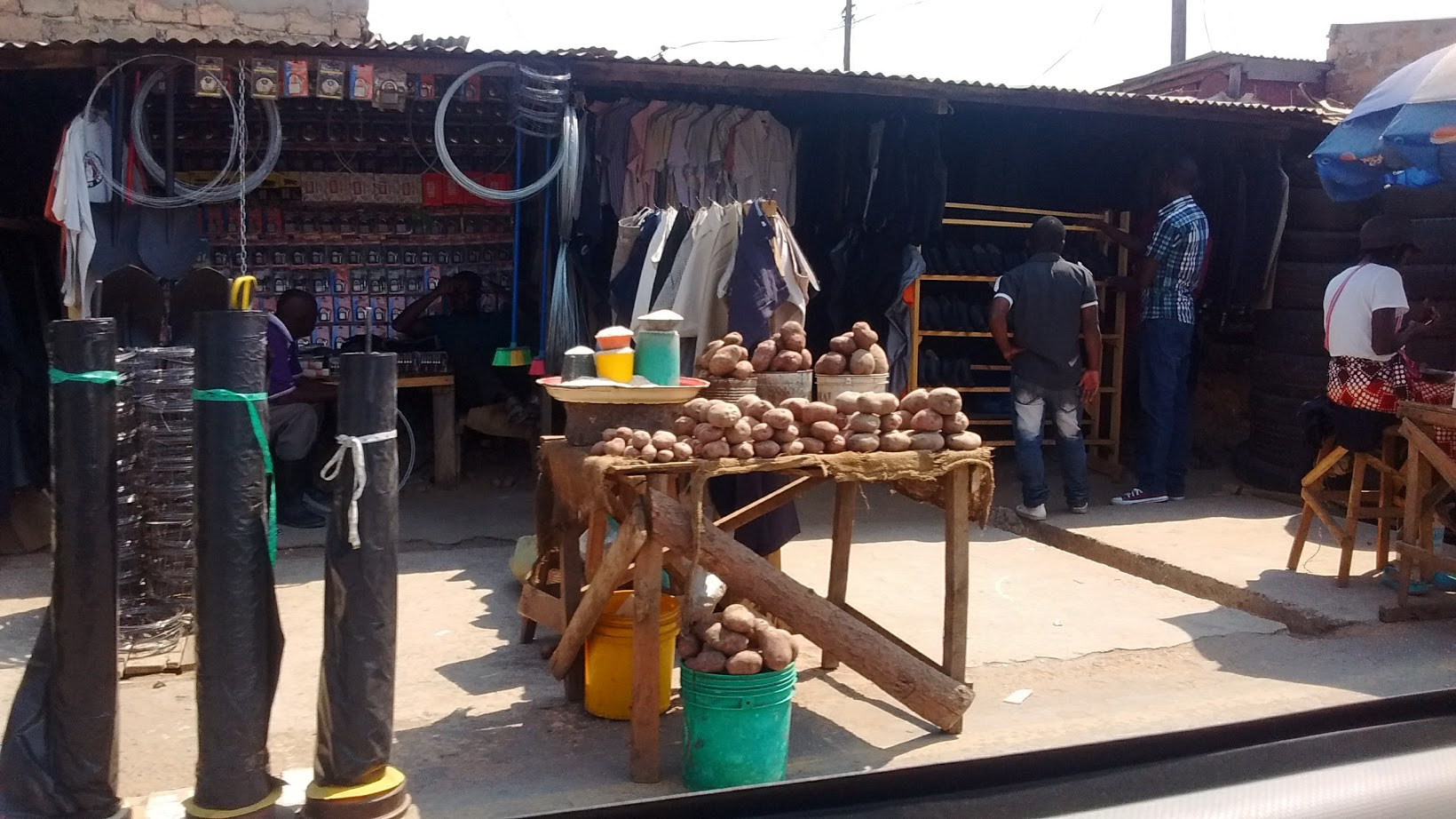
Market

== See also ==
- Kapiri Mposhi (Zambian constituency)
- Railway stations in Zambia
