= Katuba (constituency) =

Constituency of the National Assembly of Zambia

Katuba is a constituency of the National Assembly of Zambia. It covers the rural area to the north-west of Lusaka in Chibombo District of Central Province.

== List of MPs ==
Election year	MP	Party
1973	Godfrey Laima	United National Independence Party
1978	Mavis Muyunda	United National Independence Party
1983	Mavis Muyunda	United National Independence Party
1988	Mavis Muyunda	United National Independence Party
1991	Gilbert Mululu	Movement for Multi-Party Democracy
1996	Gilbert Mululu	Movement for Multi-Party Democracy
2001	Jonas Shakafuswa	United Party for National Development
2006	Jonas Shakafuswa	Movement for Multi-Party Democracy
2011	Patrick Mwewa	Movement for Multi-Party Democracy
2014 (by-election)	Jonas Shakafuswa	United Party for National Development
2016	Patricia Mwashingwele	United Party for National Development
2019 (by-election)	Bampi Kapalasa	United Party for National Development
2021	Mwabashike Nkulukusa	United Party for National Development
2026	Mwabashike Nkulukusa	United Party for National Development

== Election results ==
=== 2001 ===
2001 general election
Candidate	Party	Votes	%
Jonas Shakafuswa	United Party for National Development	2,654	32.35
Reuben Musakabantu	Movement for Multi-Party Democracy	2,035	24.80
Beatrice M. Mwala	Forum for Democracy and Development	1,818	21.16
Gilbert Mululu	Independent	466	5.68
Queen Kapembwa	United National Independence Party	405	4.94
Patricia Mwashingwale	Heritage Party	388	4.73
Rebecca Kapila	National League for Democracy	187	2.28
Charity P. Chileshe	Independent	170	2.07
Laskie Musama	Zambia Republican Party	81	0.99
Invalid/blank votes		183	–
Total		8,387	100
Registered voters/turnout		11,171	75.08

=== 2019 ===
2019 Katuba by-election
Candidate	Party	Votes	%
Bampi Kapalasa	United Party for National Development	8,727	54.99
Zacks Mwachilele	Patriotic Front	7,024	44.26
Bertha Mageya	United Prosperous and Peaceful Zambia	120	0.76
Invalid/blank votes		193	–
Total		16,064	100
Source: Lusaka Times
