= Kingstone Mutandwa =

Zambian footballer (born 2003)

Personal information
- Date of birth: 5 January 2003 (age 23)
- Place of birth: Chibombo, Zambia
- Height: 1.80 m (5 ft 11 in)
- Position: Forward

Team information
- Current team: Servette (on loan from Cagliari)
- Number: 7

Youth career
- –2021: Sunshine
- 2021–2022: → Maccabi Petah Tikva (loan)

Senior career*
Years	Team	Apps	(Gls)
2021–2023	Atletico Lusaka		
2023–	Cagliari	12	(1)
2025–2026	→ SV Ried (loan)	29	(14)
2026–	→ Servette (loan)	5	(3)

International career^{‡}
2024–	Zambia	3	(0)
- * Club domestic league appearances and goals as of 19 September 2026 ‡ National team caps and goals as of 31 March 2026

Kingstone Mutandwa (born 5 January 2003) is a Zambian professional footballer who plays as a forward for Swiss Super League club Servette, on loan from Serie A club Cagliari, and the Zambia national team.

== Club career ==
Mutandwa played for Zambian side Atletico Lusaka, where he was regarded as one of the club's most important players.

On 25 June 2025, Mutandwa was loaned by Italian Serie A club Cagliari to Austrian Bundesliga club SV Ried for the 2025–26 season.

On 2 September 2026, he moved on a new loan to Swiss Super League club Servette, with an option to buy.

== International career ==
Mutandwa represented Zambia internationally at the 2023 U-20 Africa Cup of Nations.

Mutandwa made his debut for the Zambia national team on 11 June 2024 in a World Cup qualifier against Tanzania at the Levy Mwanawasa Stadium. He substituted Evans Kangwa in the 87th minute, as Zambia lost 0–1.

== Style of play ==
Mutandwa mainly operates as a striker and has been described as "tall and physical".

== Personal life ==
Mutandwa is a native of Chibombo, Zambia.
