= Mumbwa District =

Coordinates: 15°00′S 26°30′E

- District
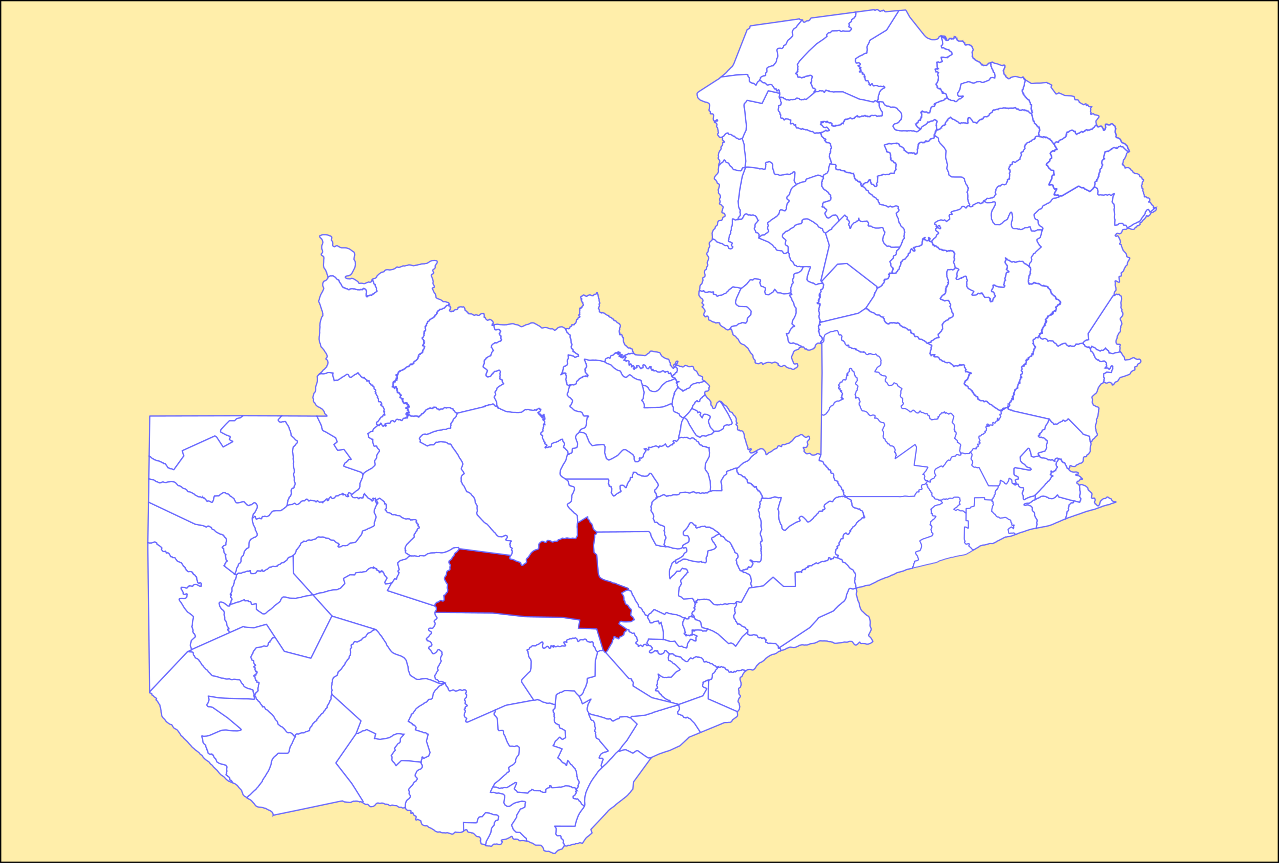
- District location in Zambia
- Country: Zambia
- Province: Central Province
- Capital: Mumbwa

Area
  - Total: 19,858.8 km^{2} (7,667.5 sq mi)

Population (2022)
  - Total: 332,237
  - Density: 16.7300/km^{2} (43.3304/sq mi)
- Time zone: UTC+2 (CAT)

Mumbwa District is a district of Zambia, located in Central Province. The capital lies at Mumbwa. As of the 2022 Zambian Census, the district had a population of 332,237 people. It consists of two constituencies, being Mumbwa and Nangoma.

== Towns ==
Mumbwa District's main population center is Mumbwa, which is close to other towns such as Kasip and Muembe. In the district's south are the settlements of Banachewembwe and Namukumbo.

== Bodies of Water ==
The Kafue River forms the district's boundary with Kasempa District before it bisects the district. On its banks is Game Scout Camp. The Chulwe fishing camp lies in Blue Lagoon National Park.

== Transportation ==
The roads that lie in the district are the M9 (which heads to Lusaka in the east and to Kaoma and Mongu in the west), M20 (Old Mumbwa Road; which heads eastwards from Mumbwa to Landless Corner and Kabwe), D181 (which heads northwards from Mumbwa to Kasempa), D180 (which connects Mumbwa with Itezhi-Tezhi), D183 and D769 (which connects the central part of the Kafue National Park with Itezhi-Tezhi).
