= Dora Moono Nyambe =

Zambian philanthropist (1992–2024)

- Born: 23 June 1992; Kabwe, Zambia
- Died: 25 December 2024 (aged 32); Zambia
- Occupations: Educator; TikToker
- Known for: Humanitarian work in Mapapa, Mkushi

TikTok information
- Page: Dora moono Nyambe
- Followers: 4.2 million
- Last updated: 28 December 2024

Dora Moono Nyambe (23 June 1992 – 25 December 2024) was a Zambian humanitarian, educator, and TikToker known for her work with children in rural Zambia.

== Biography ==
Nyambe was born in Kabwe, Zambia to a South African mother and Zambian father. She grew up in Chibombo, Lusaka, Zambia. She was exposed to foreign missionaries at a young age, and recognized the obstacles of foreigners providing aid. Nyambe became certified as a primary school and ESL teacher, and had planned to work as a teacher in China. She adopted her first child at age 22.

Nyambe first visited Mapapa, Mkushi, Zambia in 2019, to meet a friend's family. She was "shocked by the number of children who were out of school, and the high rates of early marriage and teen pregnancies". At the time, Nyambe had five adopted children, three of whom were teenagers.

Nyambe and her children moved to Mapapa when she was 27 years old. She faced multiple challenges, including negativity from local residents and a termite infestation in her new residence, a mud hut. In Mapapa, Nyambe founded the charity Footprints of Hope and established a school. By 2023, the school served 350 students, including 150 boarding students, and included classrooms, a library, a dining hall, and dormitories. The school runs from early February through early December, with the break allowing for students to assist families with agricultural activities. With time, Nyambe's programs became more popular among locals, who recognized the positive impacts they were having on children. As of 2023, she was receiving no institutional or government support for her work.

She adopted 13 children in total and fostered her 150 boarding students. In addition to education initiatives, Nyambe also intervened in her students' arranged child marriages, sometimes reimbursing families for the money they spent on a child's wedding. She also pursued legal action against those who had abused her students.

A book about Nyambe's story, Under a Zambian Tree, was written by Joseph Schmitt and released in February 2023.

Nyambe died in the early hours of 25 December 2024, at the age of 32. She was buried on 29 December at her school in Mapapa. According to a teacher at her school, Nyambe had felt ill on 24 December, and drove herself to a local clinic after passing out multiple times; she was pronounced dead at a nearby hospital.

== Online presence ==
In May 2020, at the encouragement of one of her daughters, Nyambe started posting on TikTok about her work, and some of her early videos went viral. By September 2020, she had over 700,000 followers. By 2023, she had 4 million followers and had raised nearly US$500,000 towards children's education. On one GoFundMe posted by Nyambe, her viewers raised US$58,000 to make boreholes for the village to access water.

Nyambe was at times criticized for her account, both by Zambians who suggested she was promoting stereotypes of the country and by foreigners who suggested her content was "charity porn". She responded to these suggestions by pointing out that rather than exploiting her students' suffering, she focused on their achievements and "the good that comes with proper nutrition, education, care and love".
