= Mkushi =

Human settlement

- Town
- Location in Zambia
- Coordinates: 13°38′30″S 29°25′30″E
- Country: Zambia
- Province: Central Province
- District: Mkushi District
- Time zone: UTC+2 (CAT)
- Climate: Cwa

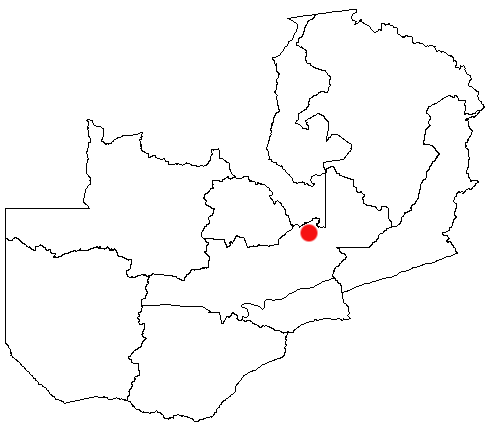
Location of Mkushi in Zambia

Mkushi is a town in the Central Province of Zambia, located on the T2 road (Great North Road) and the TAZARA Railway, north-east of Kapiri Mposhi. The Changwena Falls and Fort Elwes (built-in 1896 by European gold prospectors) lie nearby. Mkushi is well known within Zambia for its commercial farms and is where Chengelo School is situated.

== See also ==
- Railway stations in Zambia
