= Chisamba District =

Coordinates: 14°50′S 28°34′E

- District
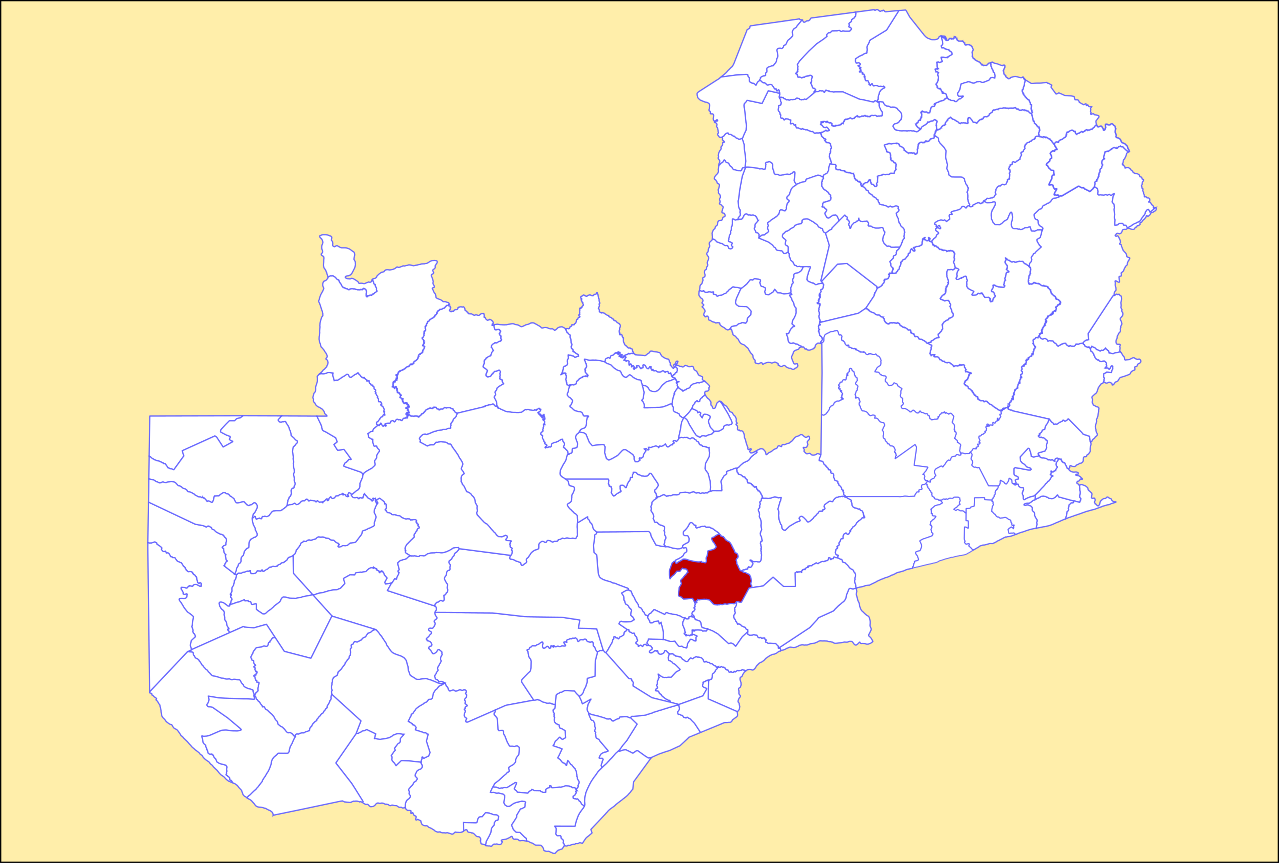
- District location in Zambia
- Country: Zambia
- Province: Central Province
- Capital: Chisamba

Area
  - Total: 5,204.5 km^{2} (2,009.5 sq mi)

Population (2022)
  - Total: 160,828
  - Density: 30.902/km^{2} (80.035/sq mi)
- Time zone: UTC+2 (CAT)

Chisamba District is a district of Central Province, Zambia. It covers a total surface area of 5,204.5 sq km and is known for its agricultural activities with over 32,000 small scale farming families and 256 commercial farmers, the majority of whom are white Zambians. It shares borders with Lusaka, Chongwe, Chibombo, Kabwe, Kapiri Mposhi and Luano Districts. As of the 2022 Zambian Census, the district had a population of 160,828 people.

== History ==
Chisamba District was created in 2013 (by splitting Chibombo District), due to the efforts of Zambian president Michael Sata. The first District Commissioner was Ferdinard Chipindi. The district's founding was possible due to land given for district development by Chief Chamuka of the Lenje speaking people. At its founding, the district had a population of 87,828. By 2022, this had grown to 160,828.

In December 2018, the Mwomboshi Dam was completed on the river of the same name. The project cost $28 million in US dollars. The dam created a reservoir with the capacity to store 61 million cubic meters of water, intended for irrigation. The dam is expected to mitigate the effect of droughts and seasonal variation in rainfall. 250 families were displaced by the dam and reservoir.

== Geography ==
Chisamba district is fed by three rivers, the Mwomboshi, Musuwishi and Mulungushi. It is also surrounded by the Miombo woodlands, which are a designated bird sanctuary.

=== Agriculture ===
Chisamba district lies in the region that has one of the most favorable rain patterns across the central region and falls on the country’s fertile belt that extends from the western reaches of the province through to the easterly-northeast into Mkushi. Chisamba as an area has always been renowned to be championing the agriculture sector in the country even before it was declared a district. The consistency in the climatic and geographical character of the district presents it as one of low-risk potential investment areas in agriculture due to environmental predictability.

=== Mining ===
Despite being a known agriculture district, Chisamba has a number of mineral deposits specifically in Mwantaya Ward. Currently, the known mineral deposits in the district include; Gold, Copper, Iron Ore and Silver.
