= Lala people =

Bantu ethnic group

The Lala people are a Bantu ethnic group found in the Serenje District of the Central Province of Zambia.

== Language ==
The Lala language, known locally as Ilala, is mutually intelligible/closely related with the Bisa and Bemba languages of the Northern, Muchinga, and Luapula provinces of Zambia. In 2016, there was an effort to take inventory of the proverbs of the Lala in Luano District.

== History ==
Like many other ethnic groups in Zambia and South Africa, the Lala are said to have descended from the Luba-Lunda Kingdom in present-day Democratic Republic of Congo. Most of the Lala settled in the Central Province under chief Chitambo in Serenje District.

== Society & Culture ==
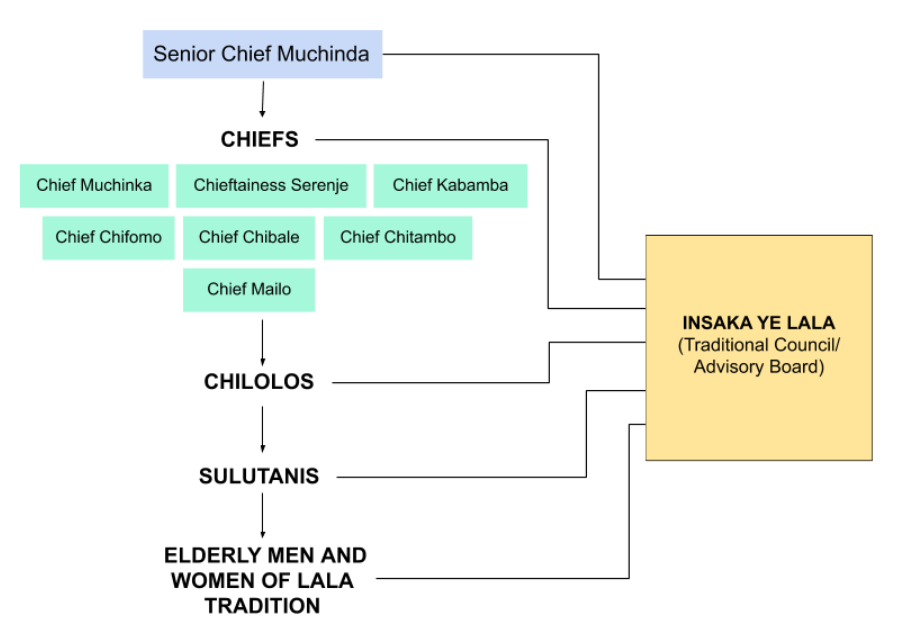
An infographic depicting the traditional Lala hierarchy.

=== Hierarchy ===
The Lala are traditionally governed by chiefs. There are a number of chiefdoms that govern the Lala, including Chitambo, Muchinda, Chisomo, Serenje, Kabamba, Mailo, Chibale, Mboshya and others. At the top of the hierarchy is the most senior chief, Chief Muchinda, who oversees the welfare of all Lala chiefdoms. He is helped by other chiefs, who are at the same level of hierarchy to each other. Each chief presides over a certain chiefdom with boundaries marked. The Senior Chief holds the title of 'Kankomba-we-Lala', and the royal family is called 'Bena Nyendwa'. The third level are the 'Chilolos', who preside over a bigger area with multiple villages and headmen within a chiefdom. Below them are 'Sulutani', village headmen and women. They oversee a small area and are aided or followed by village elders, who uphold Lala tradition.

Separate from this hierarchy is the traditional council, referred to as 'Insaka ye Lala'. It is an independent institution constructed to be an advisor to chiefs and other Lala community groups. According to Buckle in his 1976 manuscript on David Livingstone, he attests to the existence of chiefs and headmen among the Lala in Livingstone's time.

=== Food ===
The Lala are traditionally small scale farmers, hunters, and fishermen. Staple foods include the cassava, finger millet, groundnuts, and maize. In the past, the main food of the Lala was 'nshima ya maho na Mulimwa' (nshima with beans). The nshima could come from mielie-meal of amale' (millet), kalundwe', or 'tute' (cassava). Other traditional foodstuffs include kandolo' (sweet potatoes), ifipushi' (pumpkin), imyungu/umumbu' (African squash), ichinyeka' (African polony, also called chikanda), 'ifinkubala' (mopane worms), and others. The crops were traditionally cultivated in the 'Chitemene' system, where trees were cut down to act as fertilizer for crops. Due to environmental concerns, this cultivation system was stopped in favor of cultivating lands far away from homes, and returning later after harvest. Globalization has also introduced new foods crops, such as rice, potatoes, new varieties of sweet potatoes, different types of beans, maize, and other crops.

In the past, the Lala relied on fishing and hunting; hunting was done using traps, spears, a bow and arrow, and women and men would commonly go to the river to fish. However, this has become unsustainable with declining numbers of game.

=== Clothing ===
The Lala people dress in a similar manner to other ethnic groups of Zambia. According to respondents, the Lala used 'akamphangolishishi', a type of material, to make shirts and other clothes with 'chilundu', a type of tree. Elderly women would use 'impande' (roots of a plant) from the water to make 'ubulungu' (a type of necklet made from hairs); this symbolizes an elder who is pure Lala. However, these days, very few Lalas wear such materials. With the advent of globalization, many Lala women have adopted the wearing of chitenge fabric and ichitambal (head wraps), and men have adopted trousers, shorts, and chitenge tops. It is common to see such traditional dress during the 'Ichibwela Mushi' ceremony.

=== Entertainment ===
Like many other Zambian societies, Lala entertainment takes the form of traditional songs, and evening storytelling around a fire. Dances of different kinds, such as the Kakele, are performed, and poetry and drama are very common.

=== Ceremonies ===
The Lala have also traditionally had an initiation ritual for girls upon getting their first period; they would be secluded from the community for a period of time, and be taught lessons, coupled with dances, in preparation for their adult life. This practice is similar to many other groups in Zambia, such as the wali ceremony of the Luvale. It is no longer commonly performed by many among the Lala.

==== Ichibwela Mushi ====
The Ichibwela Mushi, also called Chibwelamushi, is a harvest festival celebrated by the Lala, Bisa, and Swaka in the Mkushi district in September. The word means "returning to the village from the farms." The purpose of the ceremony is to give thanks to the ancestral spirits and gods for providing good rains and a bountiful harvest. During the ceremony, aspects of the Lala culture are shown off, like dances, dramas, and songs. Traditional foods, like locally prepared beer, 'katata' and 'katubi', along with locally grown crops are displayed. Traditional dress and crafts are also shown, like drawings, sculptures, hoes, axes, and others.

=== Marriage ===
Unlike some other groups in Zambia, the Lala practice monogamous marriages. There are three conventional ways of marrying among the Lala: a pre-arranged marriage between a man and a woman's families, a man and a woman asking permission from their families to marry each other, and a man who impregnated a woman is pressured by her family to take her as his wife. The man's family will take a dowry from a woman's family, consisting of a 'sembe' (hoe), 'ubulangeti' (blanket), and chitenge. In the past, money was not charged to the bride's family.
