= Chilanga, Zambia =

Chilanga
- Town
- Location within Zambia
- Coordinates: 09°23′S 32°33′E
- Country: Zambia
- Province: Muchinga Province
- District: Nakonde District

Chilanga is a town in the Nakonde District of Muchinga Province, Zambia. It is near the border with Tanzania.

== See also ==
- Transport in Zambia
- Railway stations in Zambia
