= Mwomboshi =

National Assembly constituency in Zambia

Mwomboshi is a constituency of the National Assembly of Zambia. It was created in 2026 by splitting Chisamba. It covers the northern part of Chisamba District.

== List of MPs ==
Election year	MP	Party
2026	Chushi Kasanda	United Party for National Development
