= Mavis Muyunda =

Zambian politician (died 2019)

Mavis Lengalenga Muyunda (died 2019) was a Zambian politician.

== Life ==
Mavis Muyunda was a UNIP member of parliament for Katuba Constituency. From 1983 to 1988 Muyunda was minister of state of the National Commission for Development Planning. From 1988 to 1990 she was minister of state for foreign affairs. From 1990 to 1992 she was minister for water, lands and natural resources. In 2002 she was appointed special assistant to the president for political affairs. She was a member of the UNIP Central Committee. She later served as High Commissioner to Tanzania and the Great Lakes.

Muyunda died on 25 April 2019 at the University Teaching Hospital in Lusaka. She was accorded an official funeral on April 30.

== Works ==
- (with Jorge Rebelo) Apartheid's war on its neighbours: leaders of the frontline states speak out about the apartheid regime's destabilisation of Southern Africa. Sheffield City Council, 1988.
