= Mwabashike Nkulukusa =

Zambian politician

Central Province Minister
- Incumbent
- Assumed office 2024
- Preceded by: Princess Kasune

Member of the National Assembly
- Incumbent
- Assumed office 2021
- Preceded by: Bampi Kapalasa
- Constituency: Katuba

Personal details
- Born: Mwabashike Nkulukusa; 22 August 1976 (age 49) Lusaka, Zambia
- Party: United Party for National Development
- Children: 3
- Occupation: Politician; Businessman; Marketeer

Mwabashike Nkulukusa (born August 22, 1976) is a Zambian politician and businessman. He currently serves as the Member of Parliament for Katuba constituency and as the Provincial Minister for Central Province.

== Political career ==
Nkulukusa contented in the 2021 Zambian general election for the Parliamentary Seat for Katuba Constituency and he emerged victorious.

On July 24, 2024, President Hakainde Hichilema appointed Nkulukusa to succeed Princess Kasune as Central Province Minister.
