= Patricia Mwashingwele =

Zambian politician (1968–2019)

Patricia C. Mwashingwele (1968-2019) was a Zambian politician, Member of Parliament for Katuba Constituency.

== Life ==
Patricia Mwashingwele was born on 30 September 1968. Her mother was a teacher, and she was a teacher before becoming a member of Parliament.

After the 2011 general elections, Mwashingwele was the deputy president of Frank Bwalya's Alliance for Better Zambia party. Though the couple fell out and Bwalya fired her, he expressed continued regard for her:

She never lived in the past. So even though I fired her, it didn’t affect our strong personal relationship. She was my area MP and chairlady of our small Christian community. She taught me to be mature and loving even to those on the opposite side of politics. She indeed became my sister. I maintained a cordial relationship with her and greatly respected her because, despite our political differences and fallout, she kept wishing me well and said good things about me to many people.

In the 2016 Zambian general election Mwashingwele was elected to the National Assembly, as the UPND candidate for Katuba. She beat the incumbent Jonas Shakafuswa, who had left UPND to stand on the Patriotic Front ticket.

Mwashingwele died on May 2, 2019, at the University Teaching Hospital in Lusaka. She was buried in Katuba.
