= Railway stations in Zambia =

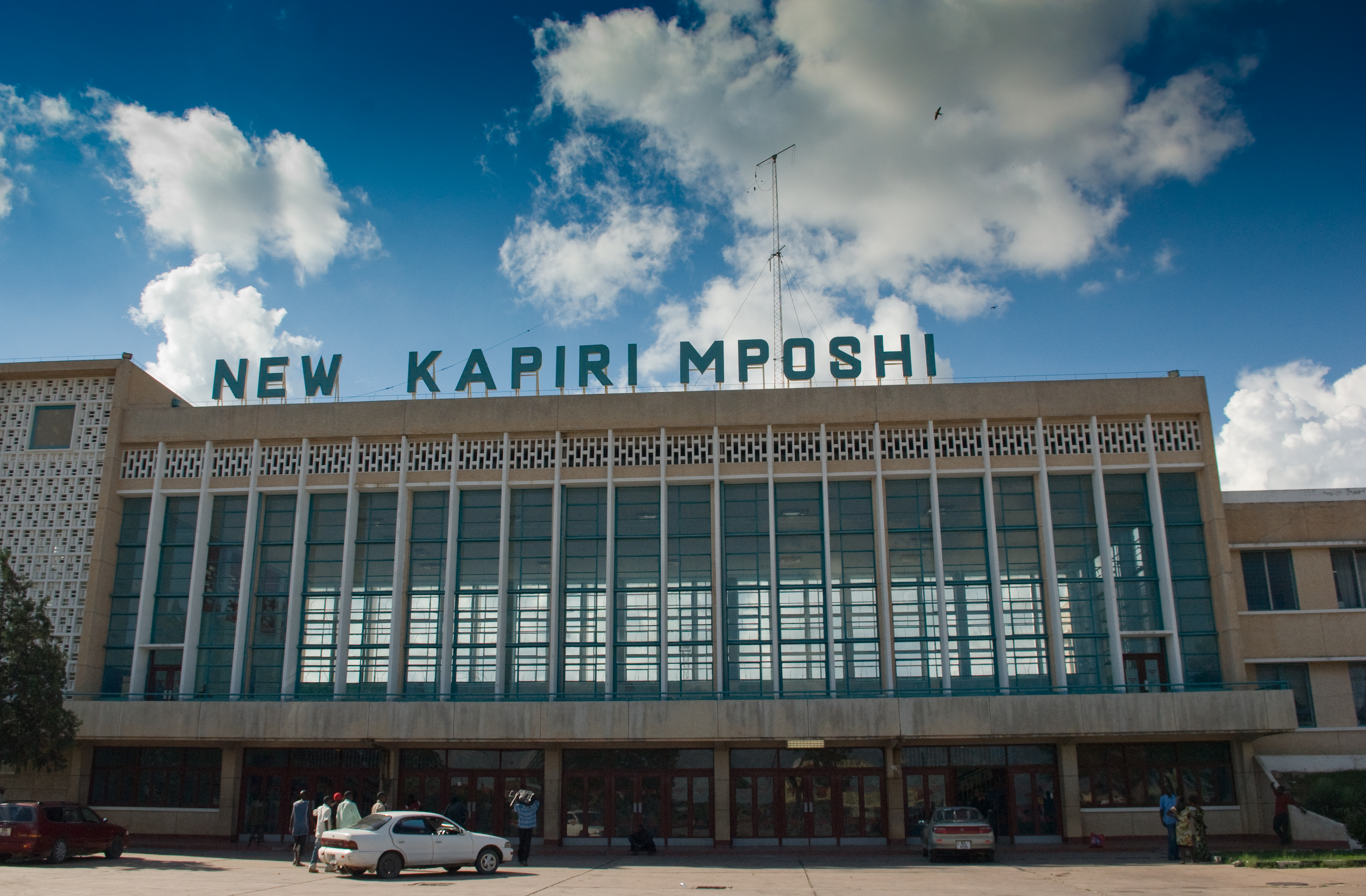
New Kapiri Mposhi railway station, TAZARA Railway, 2009.

Railway stations in Zambia include:

== Maps ==
- UN Map

== Principal towns served by rail ==
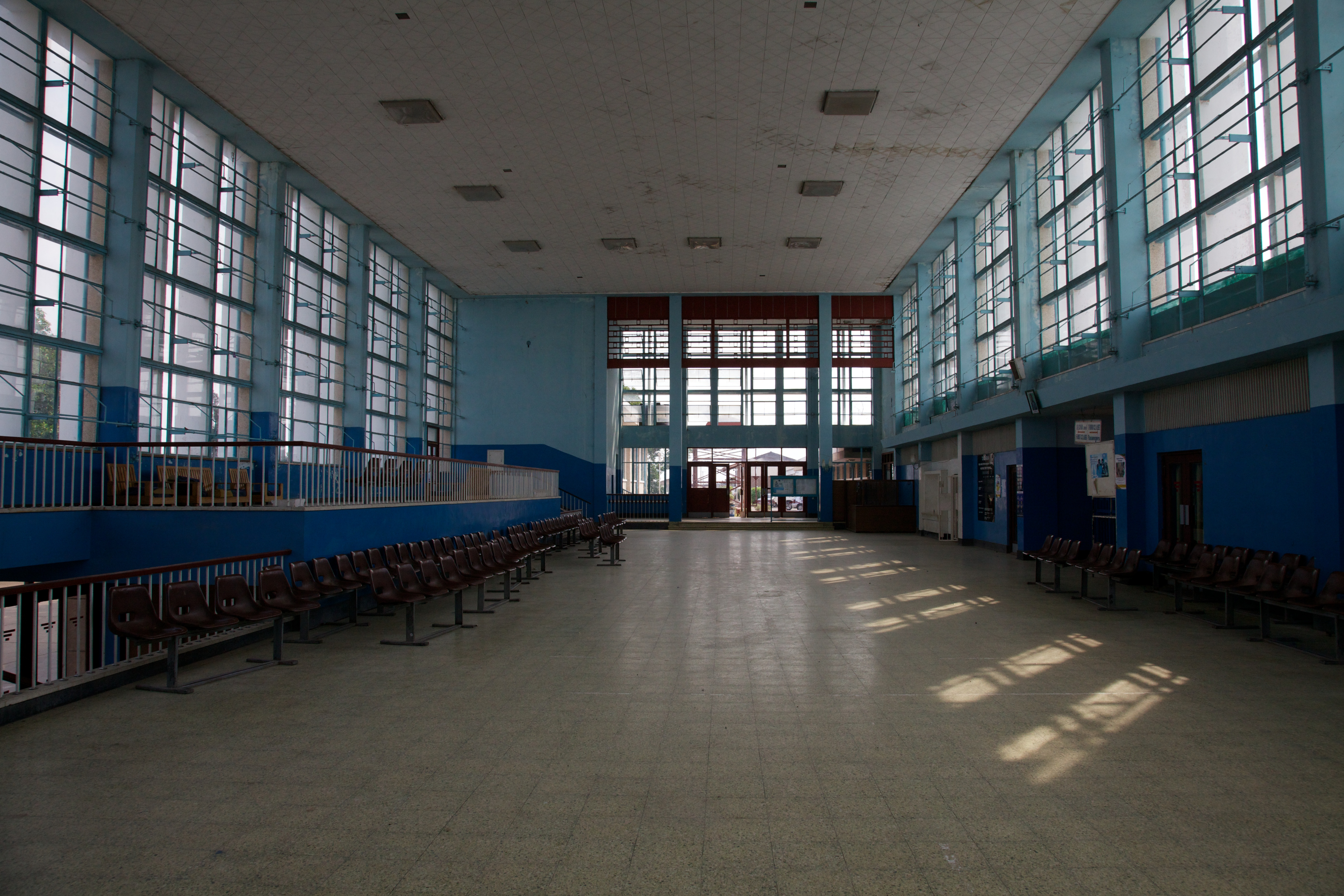
New Kapiri Mposhi interior

=== Existing ===
• Lusaka - capital	• Kabwe	• Chililabombwe — freight only
• Kafue	• Kitwe	• Luanshya — freight only
• Mazabuka	• Kapiri Mposhi - junction	• Chingola — freight only
• Choma	• Mpika	• Mufulira — freight only
• Livingstone	• Kasama
• Mulobezi	• Ndola

=== TAZARA ===
- (Zambia) Serenje
- (Zambia) Mkushi
- (Zambia) Chilanga
- (Zambia) - Tanzania / Zambian border
- Tunduma, Tanzania

=== Newly constructed ===
- (opened August 2011)
- Mchinji - connects to Malawi Railways
- (Zambia) Chipata - railhead, Dry port

=== Proposed rail ===
- (Mozambique) Nacala - Indian Ocean deep-water port
- (Mozambique) (Malawi) (border)
- (Malawi) Mchinji
- (Malawi) (Zambia) (border)
- (Zambia) Chipata - railhead from Mozambique and Malawi
- (Zambia) Petauke
- (Zambia) Serenje (proposed junction on Tazara line)

- (Zambia) Mpika - junction
- (Zambia) Kasama - junction
- (Zambia) Mpulungu - Lake Tanganyika port

=== Zambia - Angola ===
- (North-western rail project)
- (Zambia) Chingola
- (Zambia) Solwezi
- (Zambia) Kalumbila copper mine
- (Zambia) (Angola) Jimbe border checkpoint
- (Angola) Luacano
- (Angola) Benguela Railway (CFB)
- (Angola) Lobito port on Atlantic Ocean

=== Zambia - Namibia ===
Proposed in August 2013

- (Zambia) Livingstone
- (Namibia) Caprivi Strip
- (Namibia) Grootfontein

=== Botswana - Zambia ===
- Botswana - Zambia - Kazungula bridge - 2010

=== Rehabilitation ===
- Kapiri Mposhi to Chingola in copperbelt; part of North-South Corridor Project

== See also ==
- History of rail transport in Zambia
- Rail transport in Zambia
- Zambia railways
- Railway stations in Angola
