= Shibuyunji District =

Coordinates: 15°23′S 27°42′E

- District
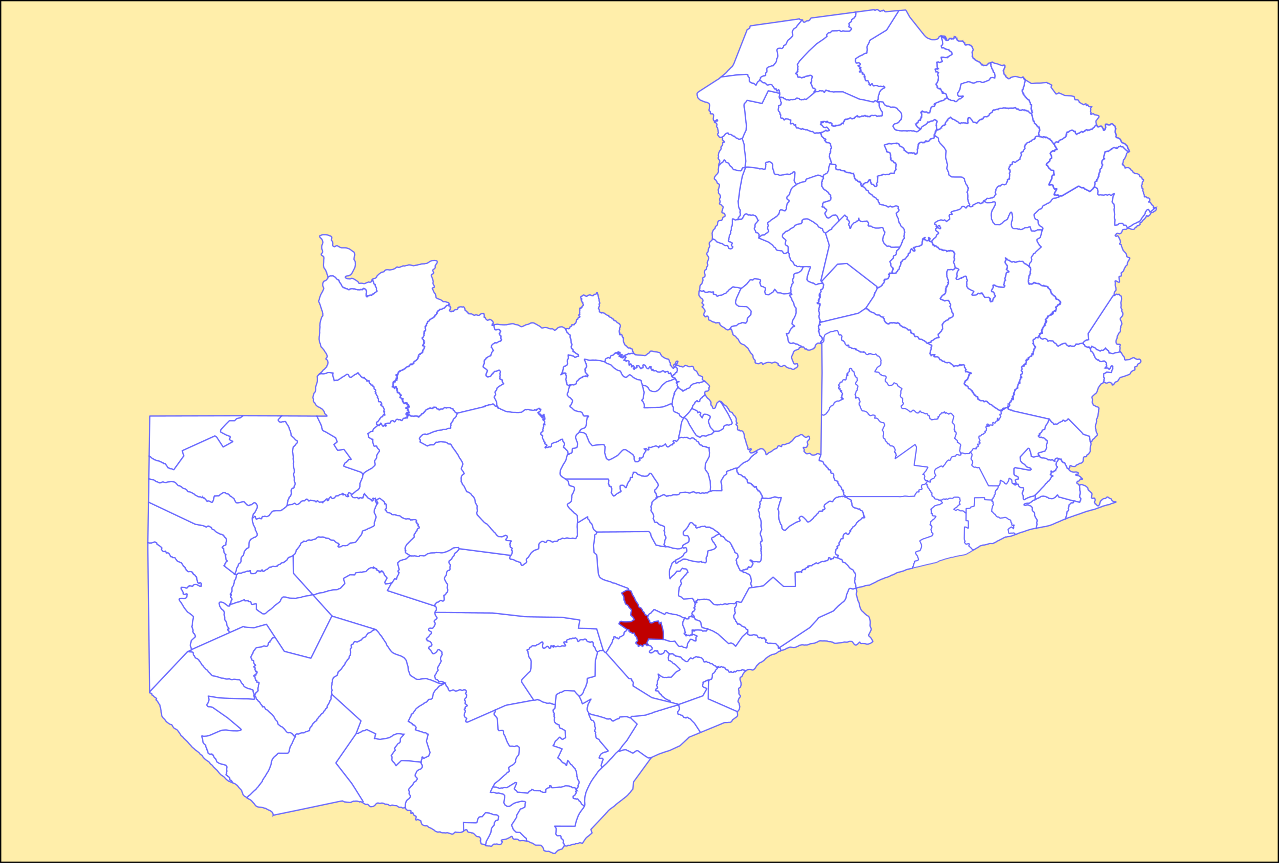
- District location in Zambia
- Country: Zambia
- Province: Central Province

Area
  - Total: 1,730.8 km^{2} (668.3 sq mi)

Population (2022)
  - Total: 91,616
  - Density: 52.933/km^{2} (137.10/sq mi)
- Time zone: UTC+2 (CAT)

Shibuyunji District, also known as Sibuyunji District, is a district of Central Province, Zambia. As of the 2022 Zambian Census, the district had a population of 91,616 people.

It was first separated from Mumbwa District and transferred from Central Province to Lusaka Province in 2012 by President Michael Sata. Then, it was moved back from Lusaka Province to Central Province by President Edgar Lungu in 2018.
