= Lukanga Swamp =

Major wetland in Zambia

Coordinates: 14.22046°S 27.64023°E

Designations

Ramsar Wetland
- Official name: Lukanga Swamps
- Designated: 8 November 2005
- Reference no.: 1580

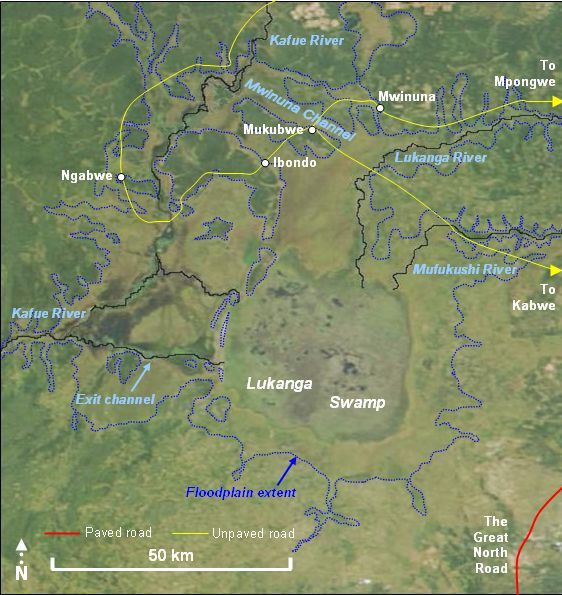
NASA image of Lukanga Swamp. Dark spots in the swamp are lagoons, elsewhere the swamp is covered in thick vegetation, mainly papyrus. Dark areas near the Kafue River are swamps with less vegetation. The overlay map shows main rivers, floodplain extent, and unpaved roads in yellow.

Lukanga Swamp is a major wetland in the Central Province of Zambia, about 50 km west of Kabwe. Its permanently swampy area consists of a roughly circular area with a diameter of 40 to 50 km covering 1850 km^{2}, plus roughly 250 km^{2} in the mouths of and along rivers discharging into it such as the Lukanga River from the north-east, plus another 500 km^{2} either side of the Kafue River to the west and north-west, making 2600 km^{2} in total. It contains many lagoons such as Lake Chiposhye and Lake Suye but few large channels, and its average depth is only 1.5 m.

== River connections and floodplains ==
The permanent swamp is surrounded by a seasonally-inundated floodplain, varying from about 5 to 25 km wide in the south and east, up to 40 km in the north, and reaching the Kafue River and its swamps 25 km to the west and north-west. When the Kafue floods it overflows north-west through the normally dry Mwinuna channel and into the lower Lukanga River, while another channel drains out of the swamp back into the Kafue in the south-west. The Kafue meanders through its own swamps which are up to 10 km wide and extend for 90 km along the river. Numerous short rivers and streams flow into the swamp from the south, east and north, of which the Lukanga is the largest. In the rainy season the floodplains are inundated increasing the area of the wetland to 6000 km^{2}, reaching a maximum of 8000 km^{2} at the peak flooding of a good rainy season.

== Human population and fishing ==
There are several inhabited islands of higher ground which stay dry through the rainy season, mainly in an arc along the western edge of the permanent swamp, such as Chilwa Island and Chiposha Island. In addition the swamp contains floating islands of papyrus which support temporary fishing camps. No seasonal roads or bridges reach into the permanently swampy areas, and only one road crosses any part of the floodplain to any extent, a dry-season road from Kabwe (with a feeder from Mpongwe) going through Mukobwe and Ibondo to a ferry across the Kafue and on to Ngabwe. Two other dirt tracks come from Mumbwa in the south to the river near Mswebe and to the floodplain at Mwanamulambo. Despite its central location in the country, the Lukanga Swamp remains relatively inaccessible and even today government authorities in Kabwe and Lusaka have relatively little knowledge of or effect on the area.

The inhabitants of villages mainly around the north-east, east and southern floodplain practise traditional methods of fishing in the swamps and farm the edge of the floodplain. There is no commercial fishing of any size, but FAO reported a 1980 estimate of 2600 t for the fish catch, sold in the markets of Lusaka, Kabwe, and the Copperbelt. A more recent report puts the figure at 1,200 t and notes declining catches due to over-fishing.

There are some smaller commercial farms especially near the Great North Road which passes within 10 km of the floodplain at the south-eastern edge. Several large commercial farms and plantations, some with dry-season irrigation, have been established on the north side of the floodplain.

== Wildlife and conservation issues ==
The floodplain is classed as the Zambezian flooded grasslands ecoregion, and the surrounding woodland savanna is the Central Zambezian miombo woodlands ecoregion, except on the south-east side which is Zambezian and mopane woodlands ecoregion. Flooded grasslands are considered to be productive and diverse owing to the nutrients brought by the flood and the fact they provide both grazing and aquatic habitats.

The miombo woodland west of the Kafue River is a game management area stretching as far as Kafue National Park. Lukanga Swamp therefore could be considered a potential extension of that rich wildlife haven.

Lukanga Swamp is home to 316 reported bird species. It supports populations of hippopotamus, and crocodile, and is considered an important site for conservation of lechwe, oribi, marsh mongoose, sitatunga, bushbuck, and python. The western side is visited by elephant, buffalo, eland and roan antelope. In 2000 the Department of National Parks and Wildlife Service (NPWS) was reported to be under-resourced in the area and the swamps "are virtually unprotected, and poaching is excessive".

Deforestation for charcoal production and for 'slash and burn' and other types of farming is also reported as a major threat to the Lukanga Swamp ecosystem mainly because it results in erosion of the land, turbidity of the water and siltation. In nearly all areas north-east of the swamp forests have been cleared especially for charcoal production, and land clearing for farming has been extensive on the north-east, east and southern sides of the swamp. Only the western side remains relatively untouched. The development of a tourism industry in the area, which (as has been seen for the national parks) results in greater wildlife conservation efforts, depends on providing access to this part from Mumbwa or Kabwe.

== Origin of Lukanga Swamp ==
The nearly circular shape of the main permanent swamp has led to speculation that Lukanga Swamp may be an impact crater (astrobleme) formed by the impact of a meteorite. However research on the ground in 2002 found no evidence of impact shock in rocks of the area, concluding that the Lukanga Swamp is not an astrobleme. In the absence of other research data the origin of the swamp is unknown.
