= Lukasashi River =

Coordinates: 12°58′S 30°46′E

The Luangwa basin with the Lukasashi (bottom center)

The Lukasashi River (also spelled Lukusashi) is a tributary of the Lunsemfwa River in Zambia. It flows through important game conservation areas along its course.

Its coordinates are 14°39'0" S and 30°1'0" E in DMS (Degrees Minutes Seconds) or -14.65 and 30.0167 (in decimal degrees). Its UTM position is SJ77 and its Joint Operation Graphics reference is SD36-09.

The standard time zone for Lukasashi River is UTC/GMT+2.
