= Ngabwe District =

Coordinates: 14°02′S 27°26′E

- District
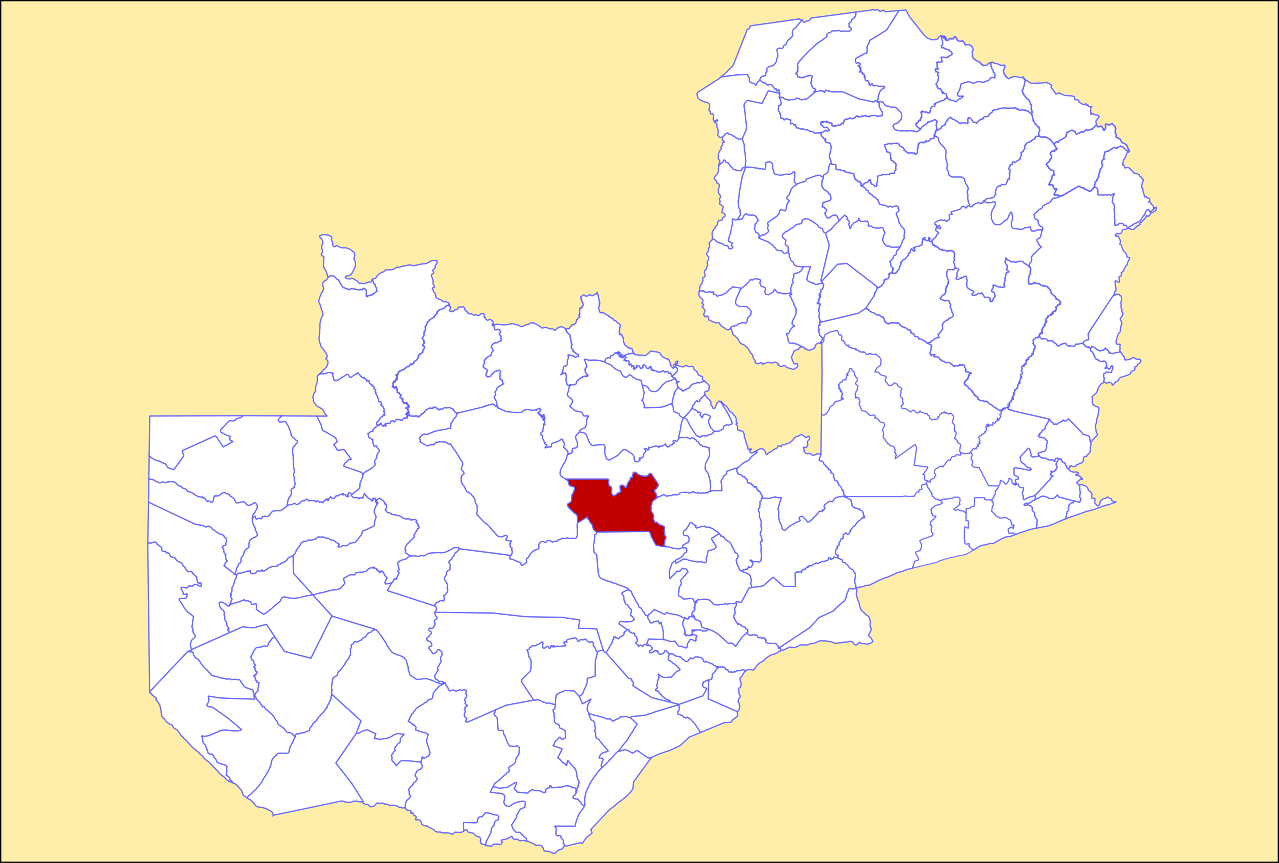
- District location in Zambia
- Country: Zambia
- Province: Central Province

Area
  - Total: 7,208.6 km^{2} (2,783.3 sq mi)

Population (2022)
  - Total: 42,104
  - Density: 5.8408/km^{2} (15.128/sq mi)
- Time zone: UTC+2 (CAT)

Ngabwe District is a district of Central Province, Zambia. It was separated from Kapiri Mposhi District in 2012. As of the 2022 Zambian Census, the district had a population of 42,104 people.

In 2017, there was a proposal by members of the Zambian government to change the capital city of Zambia from Lusaka to Ngabwe.
