= Mumbwa =

- Town
- Location in Zambia
- Coordinates: 14°59′07″S 27°03′43″E
- Country: Zambia
- Province: Central Province
- District: Mumbwa District
- Time zone: UTC+2 (CAT)

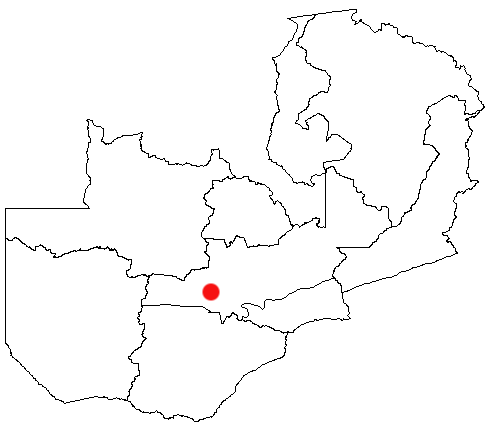
Location of Mumbwa in Zambia

Mumbwa is a town in the Central Province of Zambia, lying on the M9 Road. Its district covers the western part of the Central Province bordering Kaoma and Western Province to the west, Namwala and Southern Province to the south, Lusaka and Lusaka Province to the east, Kasempa and North-Western Province to the north and Kabwe to the north-east. It is known for its cotton and has a ginnery. The Zambia Air Force has a base in the district. Kafue National Park borders the district to the west. The predominant tribes are the Ila, who speak a dialect known as Sala, mostly to the south and south east and the Kaonde to the north. The Lenje are to the north-east on the border area with Kabwe. There are also relatively large settlement of people from the west and north west such as the Lozi, Nkoya and Luvale, Shona people from the then Southern Rhodesia who settled there as refugees from the civil war in that country and who are now almost integrated and Tonga from the south. A lot of prospecting for minerals such as copper and gold was done in the district and small scale mines operated there. Most are now closed, though the gold mine at Luiri has been revived.

== Climate ==
Mumbwa features a humid subtropical climate (Köppen: Cwa) with distinct wet and dry seasons. October and November are the hottest months. Winters are milder, with July being the coolest month. The wet season, from November to March, experiences significant rainfall. The dry season, from April to October, is marked by minimal precipitation.

Climate data for Mumbwa (1991–2020)
Month	Jan	Feb	Mar	Apr	May	Jun	Jul	Aug	Sep	Oct	Nov	Dec	Year
Record high °C (°F)	36.0 (96.8)	35.0 (95.0)	34.8 (94.6)	33.5 (92.3)	34.4 (93.9)	30.7 (87.3)	32.6 (90.7)	35.5 (95.9)	37.9 (100.2)	38.0 (100.4)	39.0 (102.2)	35.9 (96.6)	35.3 (95.5)
Mean daily maximum °C (°F)	28.0 (82.4)	28.0 (82.4)	28.3 (82.9)	27.7 (81.9)	27.2 (81.0)	25.4 (77.7)	24.9 (76.8)	28.0 (82.4)	31.5 (88.7)	33.2 (91.8)	31.2 (88.2)	28.4 (83.1)	28.5 (83.3)
Daily mean °C (°F)	22.8 (73.0)	22.8 (73.0)	22.6 (72.7)	21.1 (70.0)	19.3 (66.7)	17.0 (62.6)	16.5 (61.7)	19.6 (67.3)	23.4 (74.1)	25.7 (78.3)	24.7 (76.5)	23.1 (73.6)	21.5 (70.7)
Mean daily minimum °C (°F)	17.6 (63.7)	17.5 (63.5)	16.8 (62.2)	14.4 (57.9)	11.3 (52.3)	8.6 (47.5)	8.0 (46.4)	11.1 (52.0)	15.3 (59.5)	18.1 (64.6)	18.2 (64.8)	17.7 (63.9)	14.6 (58.3)
Record low °C (°F)	9.5 (49.1)	10.0 (50.0)	9.3 (48.7)	7.1 (44.8)	1.0 (33.8)	0.3 (32.5)	0.0 (32.0)	2.0 (35.6)	2.0 (35.6)	8.0 (46.4)	8.5 (47.3)	10.0 (50.0)	5.6 (42.1)
Average precipitation mm (inches)	194.8 (7.67)	141.8 (5.58)	94.6 (3.72)	15.7 (0.62)	1.6 (0.06)	0.0 (0.0)	0.0 (0.0)	0.0 (0.0)	0.6 (0.02)	16.0 (0.63)	103.6 (4.08)	161.7 (6.37)	730.4 (28.76)
Source: NOAA
