= Mkushi District =

Coordinates: 14°00′S 29°30′E

- District
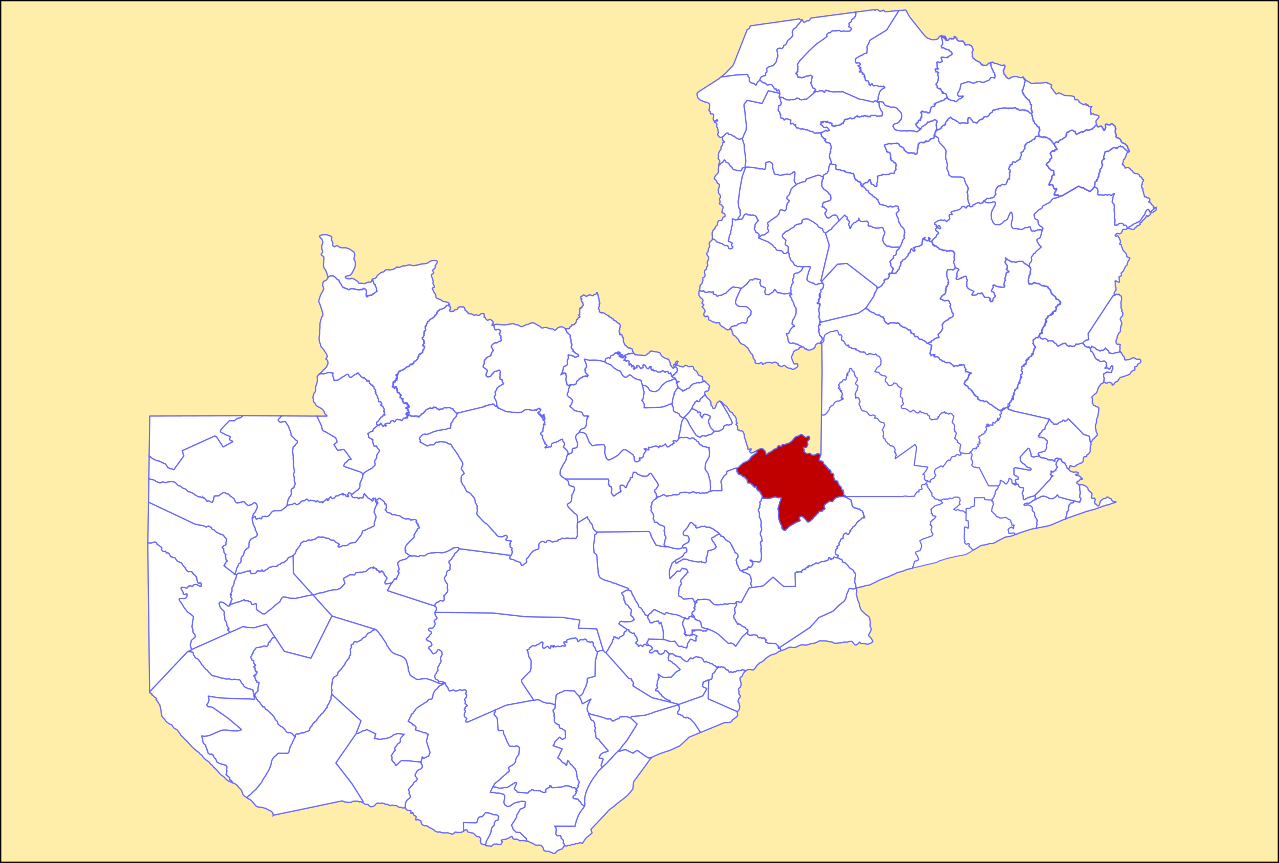
- District location in Zambia
- Country: Zambia
- Province: Central Province
- Capital: Mkushi

Area
  - Total: 8,423.8 km^{2} (3,252.4 sq mi)

Population (2022)
  - Total: 208,635
  - Density: 24.767/km^{2} (64.147/sq mi)
- Time zone: UTC+2 (CAT)

Mkushi District is a district of Zambia, located in Central Province. The capital lies at Mkushi. As of the 2022 Zambian Census, the district had a population of 208,635 people. The Great North Road and TAZARA railway run through Mkushi district, connecting Kapiri Mposhi with Serenje, Mpika, Kasama & Tanzania. The area is largely undeveloped and home to numerous natural attractions including Lunsemfwa Wonder Gorge, Changwena Falls, and historic Fort Elwes.

Bemba is the primary tribal affiliation of Mkushi district and the area is home to an annual harvest festival known as Chibwelamushi (translated as "return to the village"), bringing together the Bisa, Swaka, and Lala peoples, every September. Traditional crafts include clay pots, reed mats, and baskets and may still be found in the area, although increased access to manufactured goods has reduced production in recent decades. Mkushi district, like much of Central province, is mineral rich and manganese, gem, and gem deposits have attracted new mining development in the area, including the Fishtie copper project at Kashime.

Mkushi is known for its large commercial agricultural operations and boast a substantial population of expatriate farmers, the majority of whom are white Zambians. The prestigious Chengelo school is located in Mkushi.

== Notable residents ==
- Dora Moono Nyambe
