= Chibombo =

- Town
- Location in Zambia
- Coordinates: 14°41′0″S 28°06′0″E
- Country: Zambia
- Province: Central Province
- District: Chibombo District
- Time zone: UTC+2 (CAT)
- Climate: Cwa

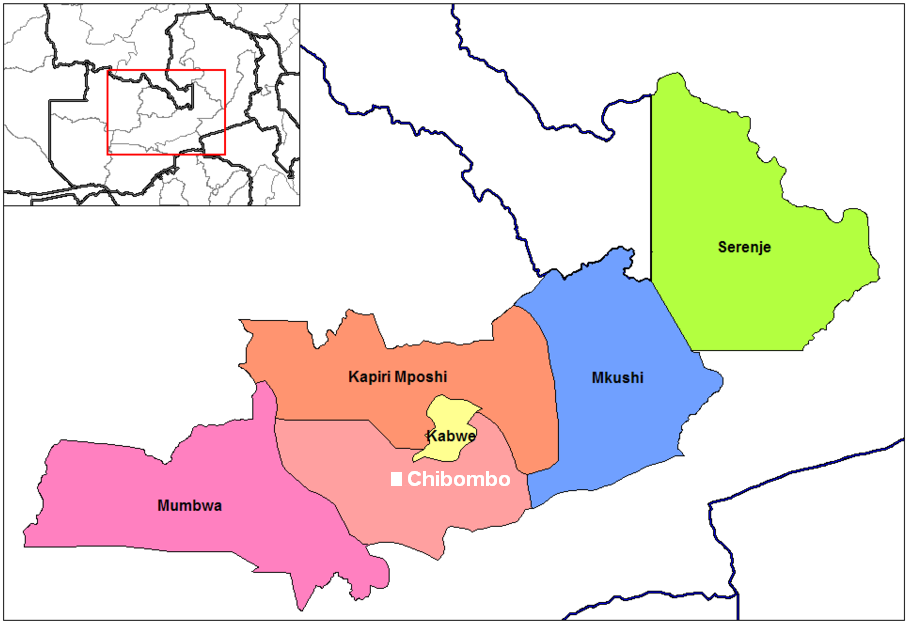
Location of Chibombo town and district in Central Province, Zambia

Chibombo is a town in the Central Province of Zambia, and is headquarters of Chibombo District. The town lies near the Lukanga Swamp. It is 95 km north of Lusaka and 45 km south-west of Kabwe on the Great North Road.

Chibombo is home of the Lukanga swamp, a wetland in Central Zambia which for hundreds of years has supported indigenous people. The people of Chibombo have built their livelihood and cultural identities based on the ecosystem services it provides.

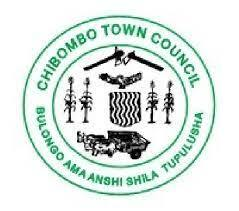
Coat of arms
