= Luano District =

Coordinates: 14°29′S 29°33′E

- District
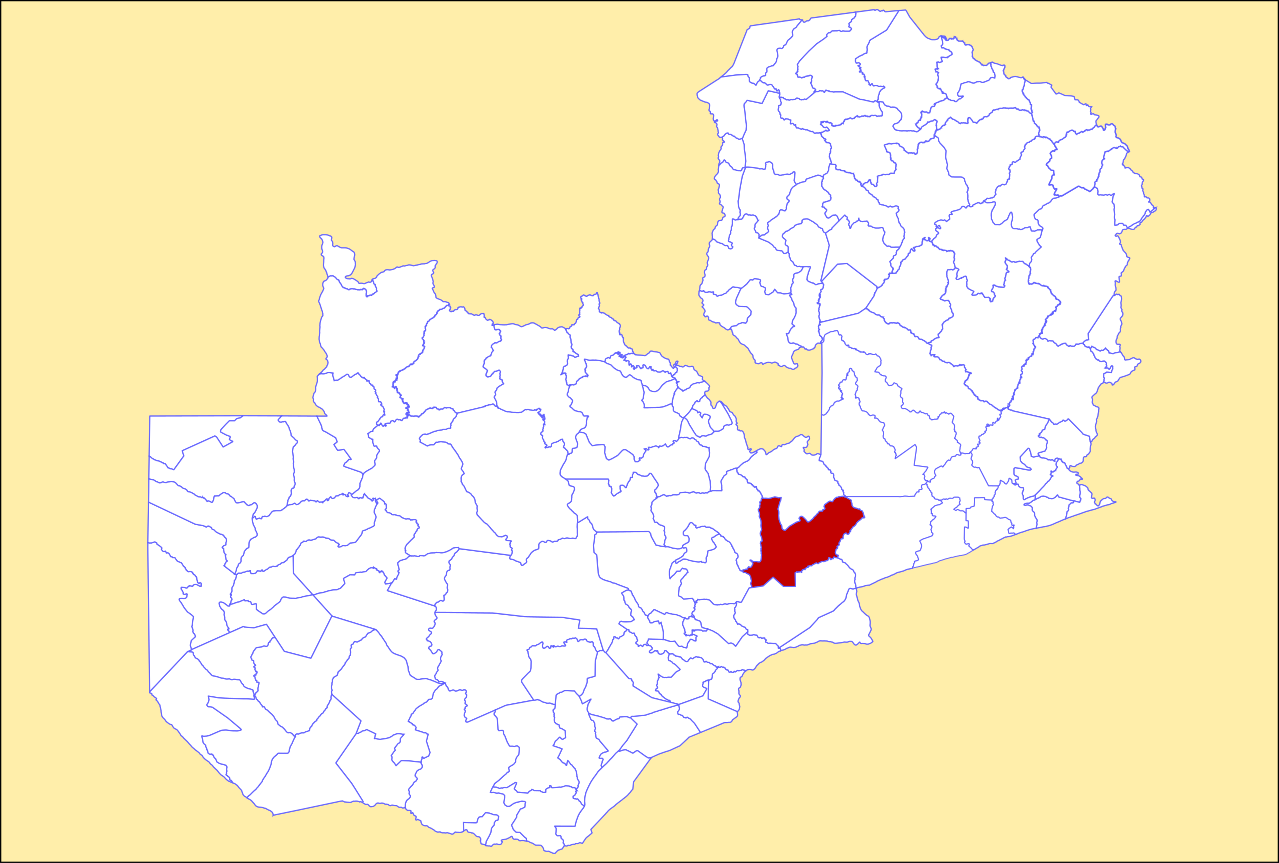
- District location in Zambia
- Country: Zambia
- Province: Central Province

Area
  - Total: 9,151.6 km^{2} (3,533.5 sq mi)

Population (2022)
  - Total: 66,679
  - Density: 7.2860/km^{2} (18.871/sq mi)
- Time zone: UTC+2 (CAT)

Luano District is a district of Central Province, Zambia. It was separated from Mkushi District in 2012. As of the 2022 Zambian Census, the district had a population of 66,679 people.
