= Chibombo District =

Coordinates: 14°50′S 27°44′E

- District
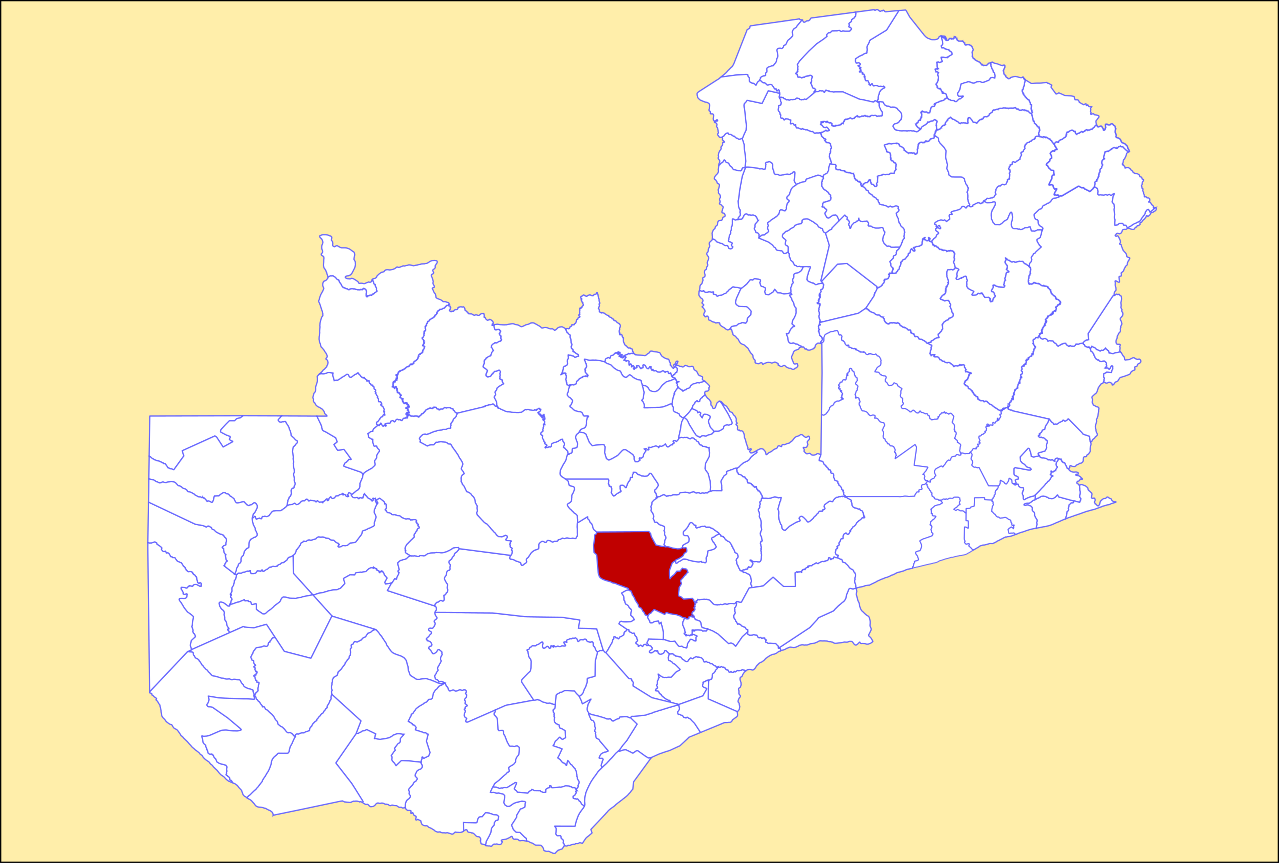
- District location in Zambia
- Country: Zambia
- Province: Central Province
- Capital: Chibombo

Area
  - Total: 13,423 km^{2} (5,183 sq mi)

Population (2022)
  - Total: 421,315
  - Density: 31.388/km^{2} (81.293/sq mi)
- Time zone: UTC+2 (CAT)

Chibombo District is a district of Central Province, Zambia. As of the 2022 Zambian Census, the district had a population of 421,315 people. It consists of two constituencies, namely Keembe and Katuba.

Its headquarters are at Chibombo, and it lies between the Lukanga Swamp in the west and the end of the Luangwa Valley in the east. It includes good commercial farmland north of Lusaka. Most of the people occupying this place are low-scale commercial farmers. Chibombo has attracted the interest of people from more developed areas of the country like Lusaka, and the Copperbelt province.

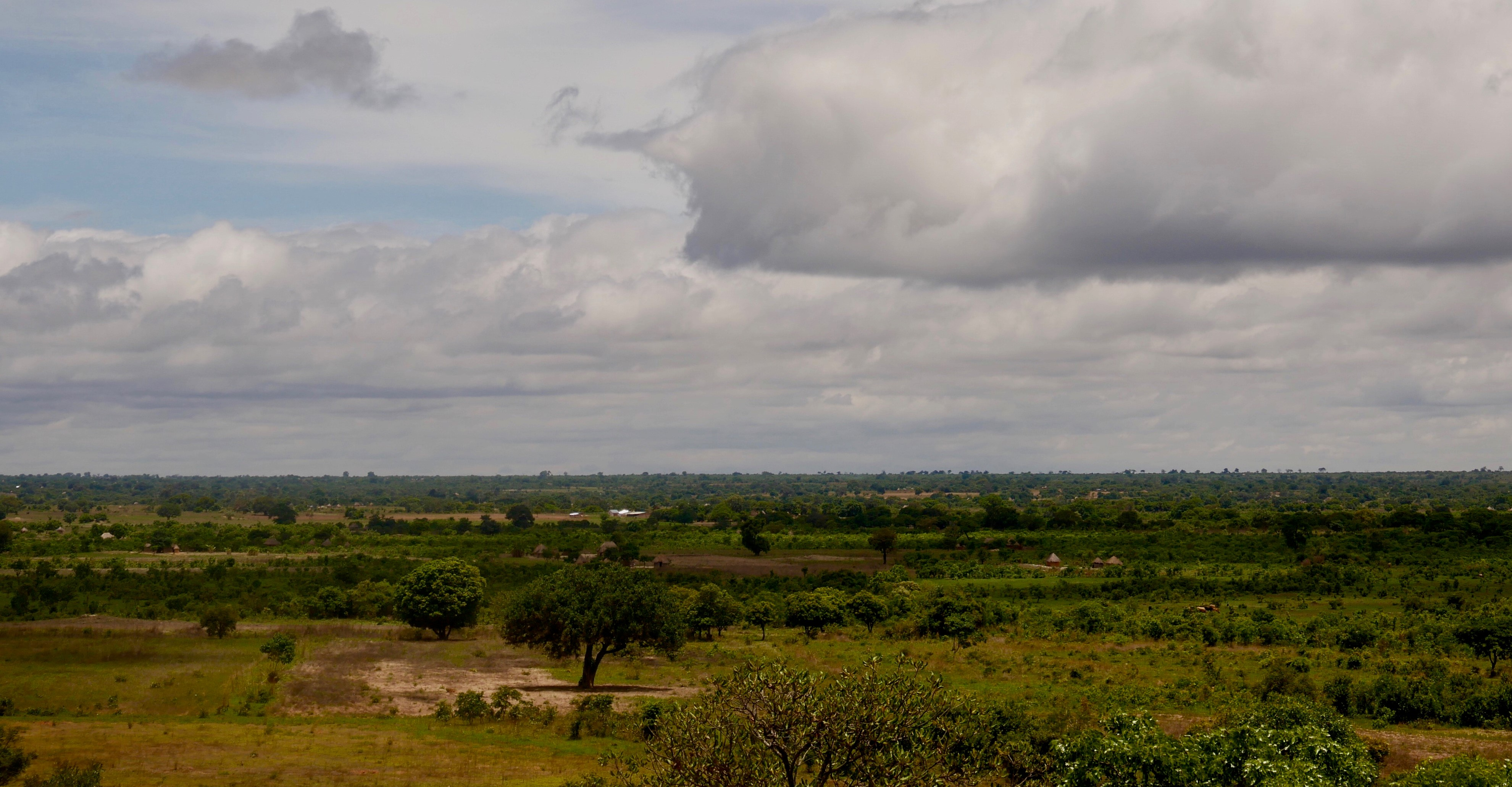
View of a village in Chibombo

The sparsely populated district still recognises a traditional hierarchy of leadership. They have a Chief and many Headmen who look after the smaller constituent villages.
