= Central Province, Zambia =

Province of Zambia

Central
- Province
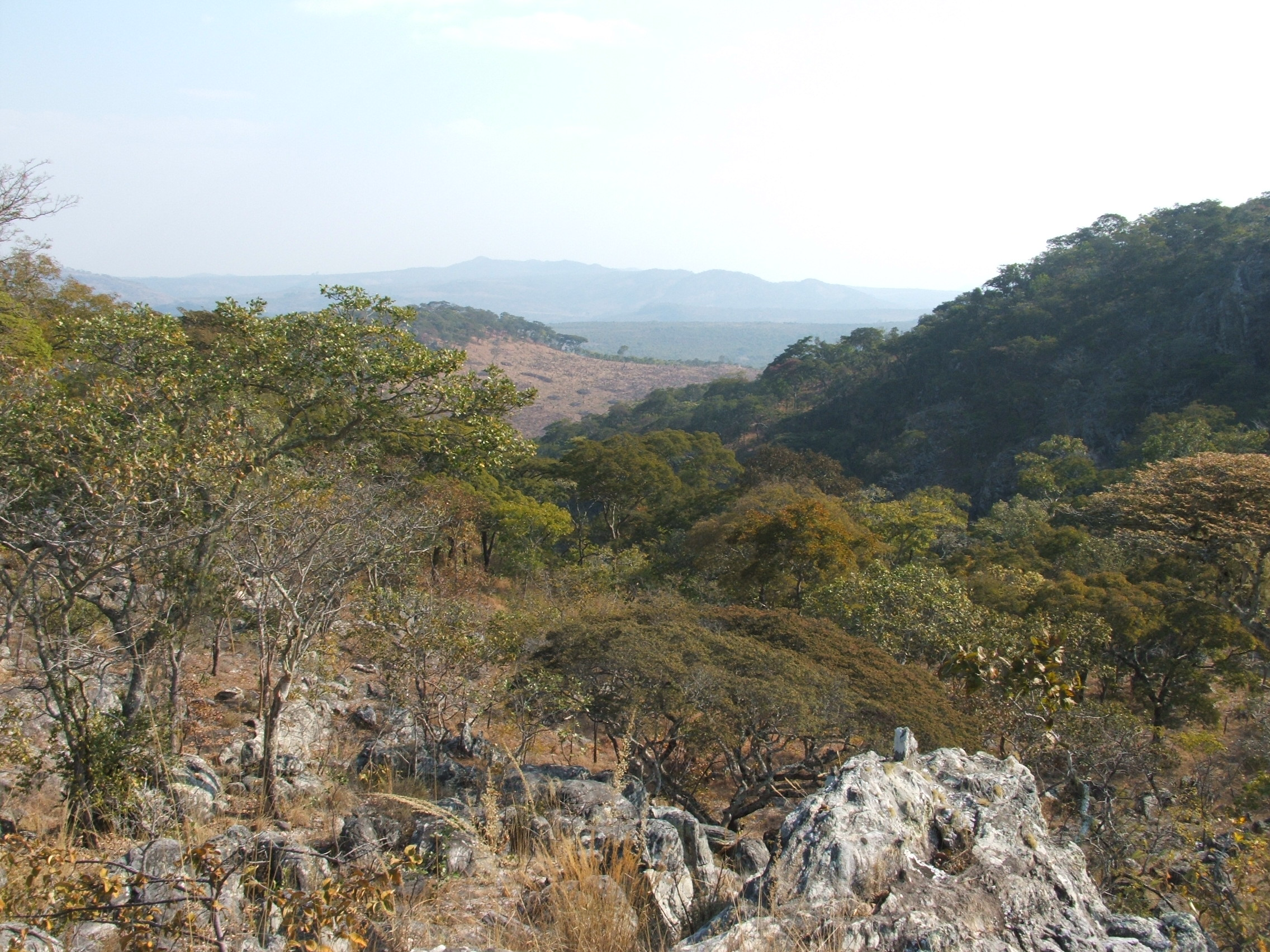
- Kundalila Falls

- Map of the Central Province

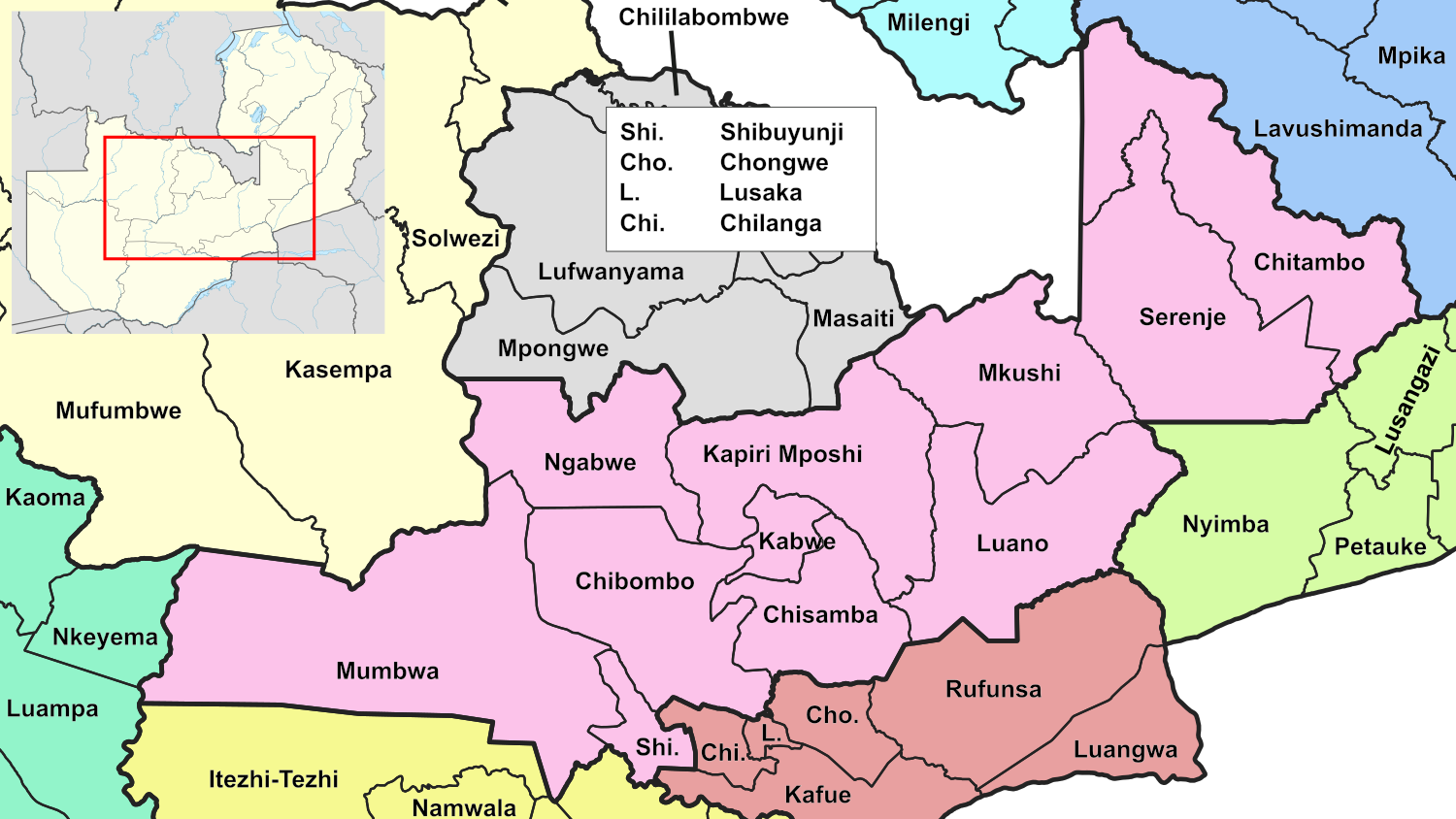
- Map of Central Province showing its districts (in pink)
- Coordinates: 14°00′S 29°00′E
- Country: Zambia
- Capital: Kabwe

Government
  - Type: Provincial Administration
  - Provincial Minister: Mwabashike Nkulukusa

Area
  - Total: 110,450 km^{2} (42,640 sq mi)
- Elevation: 1,184 m (3,885 ft)

Population (2022)
  - Total: 2,252,483
  - Density: 20.394/km^{2} (52.819/sq mi)
- Time zone: UTC+2
- ISO 3166 code: ZM-02
- HDI (2018): 0.585 medium · 5th
- Website: www.cen.gov.zm

Central Province is one of Zambia's ten provinces. The provincial capital is Kabwe, which is the home of the Mulungushi Rock of Authority. Central Province has an area of 94,394 km (58,654 mi). It borders eight other provinces and has eleven districts. The total area of forest in the province is 9,095,566 ha (22,475,630 acres), and it has a national park and three game management areas. The first mine in the region was opened up in 1905 making the then Broken Hill town the first mining town. In 1966, the town's name was reverted to its indigenous name - Kabwe (Kabwe-Ka Mukuba) meaning 'ore' or 'smelting'.

As of 2022, Central Province had a population of 2,252,483, comprising 11.5% of the total Zambian population. The literacy rate stood at 70.90% against a national average of 70.2% as of 2010. Bemba was the most spoken language with 31.80% speaking it, and Lala was the majority clan in the province, comprising 20.3% of population as of 2010. Central Province contains 20.64% of the total area of cultivated land in Zambia and contributes 23.85% of the total agricultural production in the country, with wheat being the major crop as of 2010.

The Ikubi Lya Loongo festival during July and Ichibwela Mushi festival during September are the major festivals celebrated in the province. Kafue National Park, the country's largest, is shared with Southern and North-Western Provinces, and other natural areas include Blue Lagoon National Park, Kasanka National Park, the Bangweulu Wetlands, South Luangwa National Park, the Lunsemfwa and Lukusashi river valleys and Lukanga Swamp.

== History ==
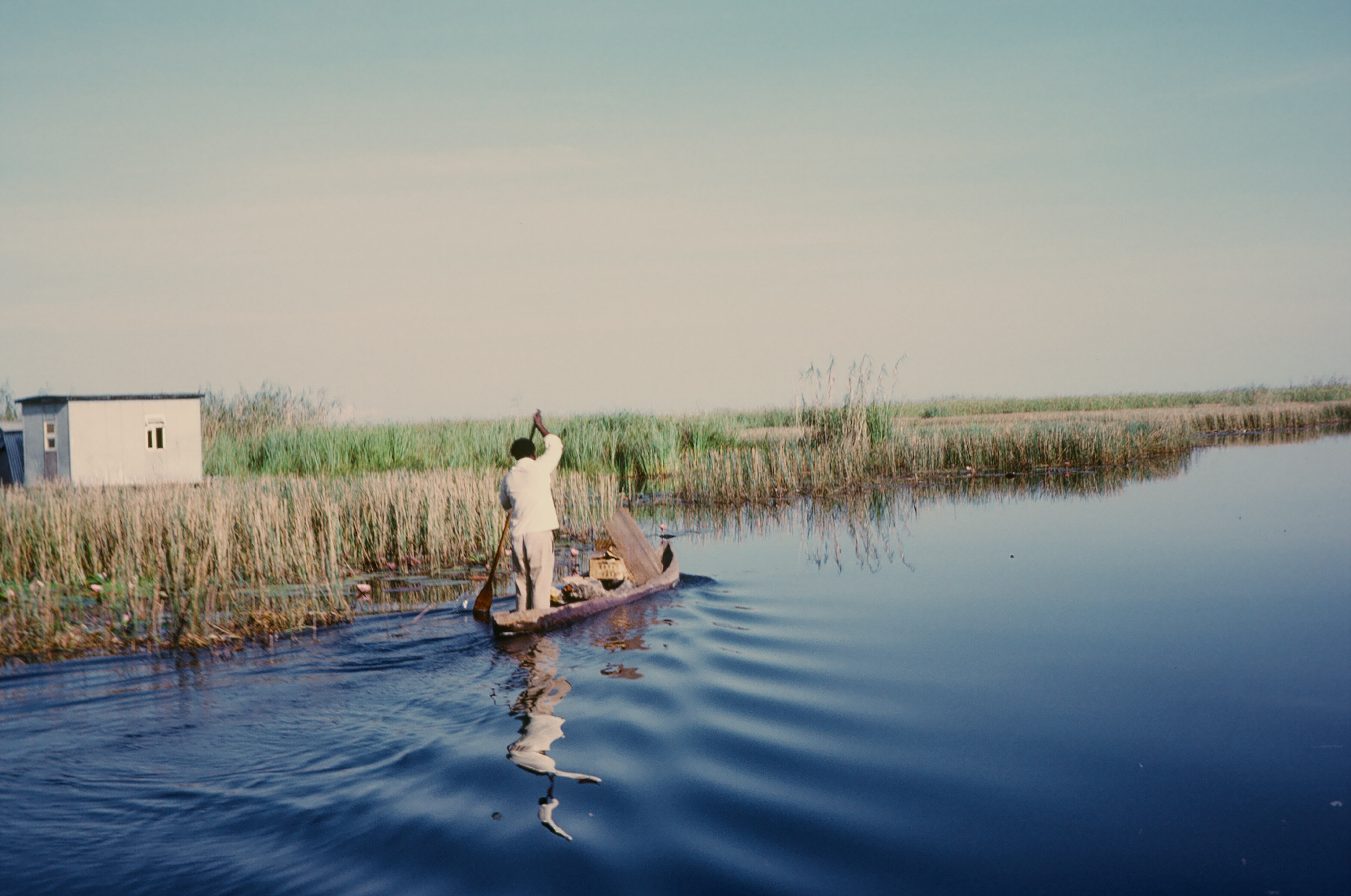
Lukanga Swamp

Central Province is considered the birthplace of the national movement of Zambia. The United National Independence Party (UNIP) was founded in Kabwe by Kenneth Kaunda, who later became the first President of Zambia and remained in office from 1964 to 1991. The provincial capital is Kabwe, home of the Mulungushi Rock of Authority. This is a historic site, an isolated flat-topped hill, where in 1960, UNIP met for the first time, away from the eye of the colonial administration. It is still used for political gatherings, but the open air assemblies have been replaced by a conference centre built nearby at Mulungushi University. The Mulungushi River gives its name to many historical policies, buildings and organizations. The 1968 Mulungushi Declaration proclaimed the country as a socialist nation. Mulungushi Hall in the capital is the venue for most international conventions.

As of 2013, Chisamba, before a part of Chibombo District, was declared a district on its own by the President, Michael Sata. As of 2015, Ngabwe, before a part of Kapiri Mposhi District, was declared a district on its own, with a proposal for it to become Zambia's new capital city by former infrastructure minister Lucky Mulusa. In 2012, President Michael Sata proposed for Itezhi-Tezhi District to be moved from Southern Province to Central Province (against the wishes of the local chiefs), which eventually happened. Chitambo District was also created by splitting Serenje District in 2012 and Luano District was also created by splitting Mkushi District in 2012. President Michael Sata also created Shibuyunji District by splitting Mumbwa District in 2012 and moved Shibuyunji from Central Province to Lusaka Province that same year before President Edgar Lungu re-declared it a part of Central Province in February 2018.

Adding Chisamba District, Ngabwe District, Itezhi-Tezhi District, Luano District, Shibuyunji District & Chitambo District to the 6 districts (as of 2011) brings the total to 12 districts as of 2018. On 17 November 2021, President Hakainde Hichilema officially declared Itezhi-Tezhi District as part of Southern Province (no-longer part of Central Province), thereby returning the district to its original province, at the request of local chiefs, bringing the number of districts in Central Province down to eleven.

== Geography ==
Central Province has an area of 94,394 km (58,654 mi) and shares a border with eight other provinces. The total area of forest in the province is 9,095,566 ha (22,475,630 acres). The province has a national park and three game management areas. There are six districts in the province. The province has fertile soil conducive for the growth of cotton and maize. Lukanga Swamp has been identified by the International Monetary Fund as a potential place for a fishing industry. Precious metals are found in the Mkushi area, gold in Mumbwa, and coal in Kapiri Mposhi. Lukanga Swamp is a permanent swamp covering 1,850 km^{2} at the mouths and along the Lukanga and Kafue rivers. It contains many lagoons like Lake Chiposhye and Lake Suye. TAZARA, the Tanzania-Zambia railway line, has a major terminal in the city. It provides connectivity to the port in Tanzania from Zambia.

=== Climate ===
Climate data for Central (Zambia)
Month	Jan	Feb	Mar	Apr	May	Jun	Jul	Aug	Sep	Oct	Nov	Dec	Year
Record high °C (°F)	27 (81)	27 (81)	27 (81)	26.5 (79.7)	25.2 (77.4)	23.7 (74.7)	23.5 (74.3)	26.1 (79.0)	29.8 (85.6)	31.3 (88.3)	29.8 (85.6)	27.3 (81.1)	31.3 (88.3)
Mean daily maximum °C (°F)	21.1 (70.0)	21 (70)	20.7 (69.3)	20 (68)	17.8 (64.0)	15.9 (60.6)	15.9 (60.6)	18.4 (65.1)	22.1 (71.8)	24.1 (75.4)	23 (73)	21.3 (70.3)	24.1 (75.4)
Mean daily minimum °C (°F)	17.3 (63.1)	17.4 (63.3)	16.5 (61.7)	14.4 (57.9)	11.4 (52.5)	13.1 (55.6)	8.7 (47.7)	10.9 (51.6)	14.5 (58.1)	17.1 (62.8)	17.6 (63.7)	17.5 (63.5)	8.7 (47.7)
Average precipitation mm (inches)	248 (9.8)	192 (7.6)	127 (5.0)	28 (1.1)	4 (0.2)	1 (0.0)	1 (0.0)	0 (0)	1 (0.0)	10 (0.4)	92 (3.6)	215 (8.5)	919 (36.2)
Source 1:
Source 2:

=== Environment ===
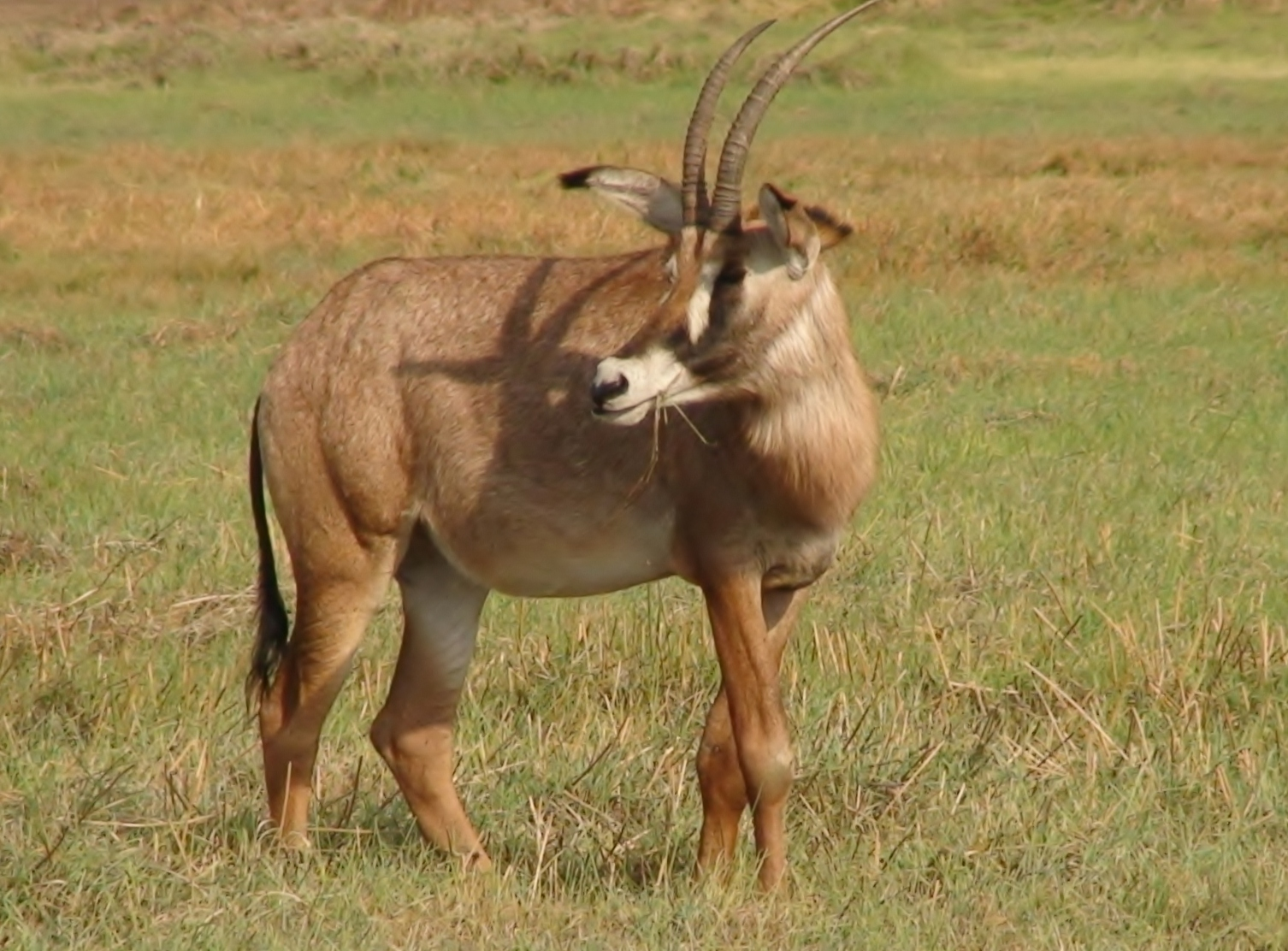
Roan antelope in Kafue National Park

Kafue National Park, the country's largest national park, is shared with the Southern and North-Western Provinces. Blue Lagoon National Park located in the northern part of the Kafue Flats, Kasanka National Park in the border of Bangweulu Wetlands, South Luangwa National Park, the Lunsemfwa and Lukusashi River valleys and Lukanga Swamp are the major wildlife and game areas in the province. Kundalila, a waterfall in Serenje district, is a declared national heritage site.

== Demographics ==
Historical population
Year	Pop.	±%
1964	505,000	—
1969	713,000	+41.2%
1980	942,589	+32.2%
1990	983,914	+4.4%
2000	1,012,257	+2.9%
2010	1,307,111	+29.1%
Sources: 1964–1969: 1980–2000: 2010:

According to the 2010 Zambian census, Central Province had a population of 1,307,111, comprising 10.05% of the total Zambian population of 13,092,666. There were 648,465 males and 658,646 females, making the sex ratio 1,016 females for every 1,000 males, compared to the national average of 1,028. The literacy rate stood at 70.90% against a national average of 70.2%. Approximately 74.87% of people lived in rural areas, while 25.13% lived in urban areas. The total area of the province is 94,394 km^{2} and the population density was 13.80 per km^{2}. The decadal population growth of the province was 2.60%. The median age in the province at the time of marriage was 20.6. The average household size was 5.5, with the average size of families headed by women being 4.8 and 5.8 for families headed by men. In the province, 54.30% were eligible to vote. The unemployment rate was 12.70%. The total fertility rate was 6.3, the complete birth rate was 6.1, the crude birth rate was 36.0, the child–woman ratio at birth was 785, the general fertility rate was 156, the gross reproduction rate was 2.5, and the net reproduction rate was 1.8. The labour force constituted 52.20% of the total population. Out of the labour force, 62.7% were men and 42.2% were women. The annual growth rate of the labour force was 2.2%. Bemba was the most spoken language with 31.80% speaking it. The total population in the province with albinism stood at 3,007. The life expectancy at birth stood at 52 compared to the national average of 51. Lala was the largest clan in the province, comprising 20.3% of population.

== Administration ==
Profession	% of working population
Agriculture, Forestry, and Commercial Fishing	13.00
Community, Social, and Personal	8.20
Construction	7.20
Electricity, Gas, and Water	8.20
Finance and Insurance	3.50
Hotels and Restaurants	10.20
Manufacturing	7.20
Mining and Quarrying	3.90
Transportation and Storage	4.70
Wholesale and Retail Trade	9.30

The provincial administration is set up purely for administrative purposes. The province is headed by a minister appointed by the President and there are ministries of central government for each province. The administrative head of the province is the Permanent Secretary, appointed by the President. There is a Deputy Permanent Secretary, heads of government departments and civil servants at the provincial level. Central Province is divided into eleven districts:

- Chibombo District
- Chisamba District
- Chitambo District
- Kabwe District
- Kapiri Mposhi District
- Luano District
- Mkushi District
- Mumbwa District
- Ngabwe District
- Serenje District
- Shibuyunji District

All of the district headquarters are the same as the district names. There are eleven councils in the province, each of which is headed by an elected representative, called a councilor. Each councilor holds office for three years. The administrative staff of the council is selected based on the Local Government Service Commission from within or outside the district. The office of the provincial government is located in each of the district headquarters and has provincial local government officers and auditors. Each council is responsible for raising and collecting local taxes and the budgets of the council are audited and submitted every year after the annual budget. The elected members of the council do not draw salaries, but are paid allowances from the council. Central Province is predominantly rural and hence there are no city or municipal councils. The government stipulates 63 different functions for the councils, with the majority of them being infrastructure management and local administration. Councils are mandated to maintain each of their community centres, zoos, local parks, drainage systems, playgrounds, cemeteries, caravan sites, libraries, museums and art galleries. They also work with specific government departments for helping in agriculture, conservation of natural resources, providing postal service, and establishing and maintaining hospitals, schools and colleges. The councils prepare schemes that encourage community participation.

== Economy and society ==
HIV infected & AIDS deaths
Year	HIV infected	AIDS deaths
1985	1,448	28
1990	12,516	410
1995	49,682	2,306
2000	79,902	5,833
2005	87,144	8,747
2010	84,321	9,016

As of 2014, a total of 6,853 (59.2%) out of 11,576 candidates obtained a Full School Certificate (the Grade 12 examination). The unemployment rate was 10% and the youth unemployment rate was 14.2% in 2016. As per the Living Condition Monitoring survey of 2015, malaria was the most common illness and accounted for 14.3% of reported deaths. HIV prevalence in the province as of 2013–14 was 12.5% overall, 14.8% for women, and 9.8% for men.

The total area of crops planted during 2014 in the province was 391,593.23 hectares, which constituted 20.64% of the total area cultivated in Zambia. The net production stood at 971,484 metric tonnes, which formed 23.85% of the total agricultural production in the country. Wheat was the major crop in the province with 99,758 metric tonnes, constituting 49.51% of the national output. The annual rate of inflation in the province as of August 2017 was 7.2% against a national rate of 6.3%, and the provincial contribution to the national inflation during the same period was 0.8.

== Culture ==
The Ikubi Lya Loongo festival is celebrated in Mumbwa district by the Sala tribe during July, the Ichibwela Mushi festival is celebrated in Mkushi district by the Bisa/Swaka/Lala tribe during September, the Musaka Jikubi festival is celebrated in Mumbwa district by the Kaonde tribe during September, the Kulamba Kubwalo festival is celebrated in Chibombo district by the Lenje tribe during October, and the Ikubi Lya Malumbe-Munyama festival is celebrated in Mumbwa district by the Kaonde Ila tribe during October. The Kulamba Kubwalo festival is attended by 250,000 people annually to pay tribute to their leader and celebrate the harvest.

== See also ==
- Bibliography of the history of Zambia

== General and cited references ==
- Mwakikagile, Godfrey (2010). Zambia: Life in an African Country. New Africa Press. ISBN 9789987160112. Archived from the original on 2021-08-21.
- Summary report for the 2010 Census of population (PDF) (Report). Lusaka: Central Statistical Office, Republic of Zambia. 2012. Archived from the original (PDF) on 2015-10-26.
- Selected Socio-economic indicators report 2015 (PDF) (Report). Vol. 6. Lusaka: Central Statistical Office, Republic of Zambia. 2016. Archived (PDF) from the original on 2017-09-10.
- Zambia: Poverty Reduction Strategy Paper (Report). International Monetary Fund. 2007. Archived from the original on 2021-08-21.
