= List of hospitals in Zambia =

This is a list of hospitals in Zambia. The list is not exhaustive. You can expand the list by adding referenced content as appropriate.

== Classification ==
Hospitals in Zambia are divided into four main categories: Specialist Hospitals (fourth Level Hospitals), teaching hospitals (third level hospitals) General Hospitals (Provincial Hospitals or Second Level Hospitals), and District Hospitals (First Level Hospitals).

== Third Level Hospitals ==
As of December 2025, there were eight Level 3 hospitals in Zambia.

- University Teaching Hospital (1,655 beds), Lusaka
- Levy Mwanawasa University Teaching Hospital (826 beds), Lusaka
- Ndola Central Hospital (800 beds), Ndola
- Kitwe Central Hospital (630 beds), Kitwe
- Cancer Diseases Hospital (252 beds), Lusaka
- Chainama Hills Mental Hospital (210 beds), Lusaka
- Arthur Davison Children's Hospital (250 beds), Ndola.
- Livingstone Central Hospital (Unknown beds), Livingstone

== Second Level hospitals ==
As of December 2012, there were 19 Level 2 hospitals in the country.

- Levy Mwanawasa General Hospital, Lusaka, This is no longer in existence. It has been upgraded to Levy Mwanawasa University Teaching Hospital.
- Chipata General Hospital, Chipata
- Choma General Hospital, Choma
- Mukinge Mission Hospital, Kasempa
- Mwandi Mission Hospital, Mwandi
- Nchanga North Hospital, Chingola
- Nchanga South Hospital, Chingola
- Chikankata Mission Hospital, Mazabuka
- Kalene Mission Hospital, Kalene Hill
- St. Francis Hospital, Katete
- Lewanika General Hospital, Mongu
- Kabwe General Hospital, Kabwe
- Kabwe Mine Hospital, Kabwe
- Kalulushi Mine Hospital, Kalulushi
- Wusakile Mine Hospital, Kitwe
- Roan Antelope Hospital, Luanshya
- Malcom Watson Hospital, Mufulira
- Ronald Ross General Hospital, Mufulira
- Mansa General Hospital, Mansa
- Chilonga Mission Hospital, Chilonga, Mpika District
- Kasama General Hospital, Kasama
- Mbala General Hospital, Mbala
- Chavuma Mission Hospital, Chavuma
- Solwezi General Hospital, Solwezi
- Livingstone General Hospital, Livingstone, Zambia, This is no longer in existence. It has been upgraded to Livingstone Central Hospital.
- Monze Mission Hospital, Monze

== First Level hospitals ==
As of December 2012, there were 85 Level 1 hospitals in the country, including the following:

- Medcross Hospital, Lusaka District
- Kaoma District Hospital, Kaoma District
- Liteta Hospital, Chibombo District
- Kapiri Mposhi Hospital, Kapiri Mposhi District
- Mkushi District Hospital, Mkushi District
- Mumbwa District Hospital, Mumbwa District
- Nangoma Mission Hospital, Mumbwa District
- Chitambo Hospital, Serenje District
- Serenje District Hospital, Serenje District
- Itezhi-Tezhi District Hospital, Itezhi-Tezhi District
- Konkola Mine Hospital, Chililabombwe District
- Sinozam Hospital, Kitwe District
- Luanshya District Hospital, Luanshya District
- Thomson Hospital, Luanshya District
- Kamuchanga District Hospital, Mufulira District
- Hill Top Hospital 1, Ndola District
- Mpongwe Mission Hospital, Mpongwe District
- St.Theresa Mission Hospital, Mpongwe District
- Mwami Adventist Hospital, Chipata District
- Lundazi District Hospital, Lundazi District
- Kamoto Mission Hospital, Mambwe District
- Nyimba District Hospital, Nyimba District
- Minga Mission Hospital, Petauke District
- Nyanje Mission Hospital, Petauke District
- Petauke District Hospital, Petauke District
- Kawambwa District Hospital, Kawambwa District
- Mbereshi Mission Hospital, Kawambwa District
- St. Paul's Hospital, Nchelenge District
- Kasaba Mission Hospital, Samfya District
- Lubwe Mission Hospital, Samfya District
- Samfya District Hospital, Samfya District
- Human Service Trust Hospice, Chilanga District
- Chongwe District Hospital, Chongwe District
- Kafue District Hospital, Kafue District
- Katondwe Mission Hospital, Luangwa District
- St. John’s Medical Centre, Lusaka District
- MKP Trust Medical Hospital, Kabulonga, Lusaka (Private)
- Hill Top Hospital 2, Lusaka District
- Mpanshya Mission Hospital, Rufunsa District
- Chama District Hospital, Chama District
- Chinsali District Hospital, Chinsali District
- Isoka District Hospital, Isoka District
- Mpika District Hospital, Mpika District
- Luwingu District Hospital, Luwingu District
- Mporokoso District Hospital, Mporokoso District
- Kalene Mission Hospital, Ikelenge District
- Kabompo District Hospital, Kabompo District
- Loloma Mission Hospital, Kabompo District
- Mukinge Mission Hospital, Kasempa District
- Mufumbwe District Hospital, Mufumbwe District
- Luwi Mission Hospital, Mwinilunga District
- Mwinilunga District Hospital, Mwinilunga District
- Chitokoloki Mission Hospital, Zambezi District
- Zambezi District Hospital, Zambezi District
- Macha Mission Hospital, Macha, Choma District
- Gwembe District Hospital, Gwembe District
- Kalomo District Hospital, Kalomo District
- Zimba Mission Hospital, Kalomo District
- Kafue Gorge Hospital, Mazabuka District
- Mazabuka District Hospital, Mazabuka District
- Chikuni Mission Hospital, Monze District
- Namwala District Hospital, Namwala District
- Mtendere Mission Hospital, Chirundu, Siavonga District
- Siavonga District Hospital, Siavonga District
- Maamba Hospital, Sinazongwe District
- Kalabo District Hospital, Kalabo District
- Yuka Adventist Hospital, Kalabo District
- Kaoma District Hospital, Kaoma District
- Luampa Mission Hospital, Kaoma District
- Mangango Mission Hospital, Kaoma District
- Lukulu District Hospital, Lukulu District
- Senanga District Hospital, Senanga District
- Matero Level One Hospital Lusaka District
- Chilenje Level One Hospital Lusaka District
- Chipata Level One Hospital Lusaka District
- Kanyama Level One Hospital Lusaka District
- Chawama Level One Hospital Lusaka District
- Kaputa District Hospital Kaputa District
- Medland Hospital (72 beds), Lusaka

== Security forces hospitals ==
- Mt. Eugenia Level 1 Hospital: (Zambia Air Force), Chilanga District
- Arakan Camp Military Hospital: (Zambia Armed Forces), Lusaka District
- Maina Soko Level 1 Hospital: (Zambia Armed Forces), Lusaka District
