= Levy Mwanawasa University Teaching Hospital =

Zambian public referral hospital

- Location of Lusaka

Geography
- Location: Great East Road, Chainama Hills, Lusaka, Zambia
- Coordinates: 15°23′05.8″S 28°21′13.4″E

Organisation
- Affiliated university: University of North Carolina; University of Zambia

Services
- Emergency department: Yes
- Beds: 1100

Helipads
- Helipad: No

History
- Founded: 2011; 15 years ago

Links
- Other links: List of hospitals in Zambia

The Levy Mwanawasa University Teaching Hospital (LMUTH) is a public tertiary referral hospital in Lusaka, Zambia. The hospital has 1100 beds and was named after the former president of Zambia, Levy Mwanawasa. It was found in 2011 and was established on 22 May 2018 as part of Levy Mwanawasa Medical University (LMMU). It serves nearly 7 million people, referred from several hospitals in Lusaka Province, as well as other several neighboring countries such as Malawi, Angola and Tanzania.

== Location ==
The hospital is located along the Great East Road in the Chainama Hills area of Lusaka. The facility has nearly 906 medical and trained administrative personnel, with more than 396 nurses and about 146 medical doctors. The hospital serves as a Provincial hospital with 3rd level services.

== Overview ==
As a public hospital, it serves as the main referral hospital for Lusaka Province and provides health services to the local community. It has several ranges of health care services including inpatient and outpatient, as well as emergency care. It furthermore provides radiology, laboratory and child health services to all patients. The facility also has specialized clinics for each specialised patient. The hospital provides both in-patient and out-patient medical services and has extensive specialised departments. It includes obstetrics and gynecology, intensive care, surgery and laboratory services.

== History ==
The hospital was built in 2011 and then it was called Lusaka General Hospital. The same year it was changed to Levy Mwanawasa General Hospital in memory of Zambia's third President, Levy Patrick Mwanawasa. It was opened on 8 August 2011 and on June 6, 2017, the facility was upgraded to a tertiary hospital to be part of the Levy Mwanawasa Medical University (LMMU) which then, was under renovation. It functions as a University Teaching hospital within a catchment area of several districts that include Lusaka, Rufunsa, Chilanga, Chirundu, Luangwa, Chongwe, Kafue and Shibuyunji with an estimated population of more than 3 million people.

=== Integration into LMMU ===
On 22 May 2018, LMUTH became part of the Levy Mwanawasa Medical University (LMMU) that was established as a Public University under provisions of Section 132 of the Higher Education Act No. 4 of 2013 by way of Statutory Instrument No. 39 and 40 of 2018.

== Collaboration and partnerships ==
LMUTH has a partnership with the University of Zambia and China.

=== Muslim Association Community ===
In July 2023, LMUTH received a donation of 100 kgs of meat and 15 bags of maize from the Muslim community. Mike Mpsoha, Minister of Water Development and Sanitation of Zambia led the ceremony with Senior Medical Superintendent Dr. Charles Mutemba in receiving the donation on behalf of Minister of Health, Sylvia Masebo.

=== Office of the Public Protector ===
LMUTH is also working with Office of the Public Protector with orienting the newly recruited health workers and other members of staff.

== See also ==
- List of hospitals in Zambia
