= Health in Zambia =

Zambia is a landlocked country in Sub Saharan Africa which experiences a burden of both communicable and non-communicable diseases. In line with WHO agenda for equity in health, it has adopted the Universal Health Coverage agenda to mitigate the challenges faced within the health sector. The Ministry of Health (MOH) provides information pertaining to Zambian health. The main focus of the Ministry of Health has been provision of uninterrupted care with emphasis on health systems strengthening and services via the primary health care approach.

The WHO Health systems framework utilizes key parameters are to assess health sector performance. These include health service delivery, human resource for health, infrastructure development, drugs and medical supplies, health care financing and health information.

The incumbent minister of health, Dr. Elijah Muchima, MP. was recently appointed by the republican President H.E. Mr. Hakainde Hichilema after serving as minister of lands and natural resources for 3 years.

The Human Rights Measurement Initiative (HRMI) finds that Zambia is achieving 76.8% of what it should be fulfilling in terms of the right to health based on its income level. HRMI's Human Rights Tracker shows that Zambia achieves 86.4% of what is expected in respect to children (2018), while it fulfills 75.0% of what is expected to protect the right to health amongst its adult population based on the nation's level of income. In terms of reproductive health, Zambia fulfills only 69.2% of what it is expected to achieve at its current level of income.

== National Health Strategic Plan ==
The republic of Zambia is currently implementing the 2022-2026 National Health strategic Plan.

== Human Resource for Health ==
Zambia I its National Health Strategic Plan 2022-2026 has set a goal to increase availability of skilled, motivated, equitably distributed health workforce and effective support services, to contribute to the effective delivery of health services.

The following objectives are set to achieve the aforementioned goal:

1. To increase the health workforce from 48% of the establishment in 2021 to 70% by 2026
2. To improve performance of health workers at all levels.
3. To increase the number of specialized training from 500 in 2021 to 700 specialists by 2026.
4. To provide adequate appropriate utility transport for efficient logistical support.

== Infrastructure Development ==
As of December 2016, 275 out of 650 health posts were built and are operational. Furthermore, 36 district hospitals were under construction, while Matero, Chawama, Chipata and Chilenje clinics have been upgraded from clinics to First Level hospital. The University Teaching Hospital (UTH), Levy Mwanawasa University Teaching Hospital and various provincial hospitals have undergone modernization with the installation of computerized tomography (CT) scans, mammography equipment. Intensive care units (ICU) in some selected hospitals. A 240 in-patient bed capacity at the Cancer Disease Hospital (CDH) was completed in 2007.

In April 2022, the construction of the 440 million Zambian Kwacha (US$25 million) Chimwemwe Level One, 80-bed capacity, hospital commenced and was scheduled to be completed and opened by July 2023. As of May 2023, the structural works by the contractor, Velos Enterprise, were 80 per cent complete.

In May 2023, the Government of Zambia signed a 471 million Zambian Kwacha (US$25 million) contract with Avic International for the construction of the Cancer Treatment Centre in Ndola, Copperbelt Province. The contractor indicated that it would take 12 months to construct and commission the fully furnished facility.

== Disease Burden in Zambia ==
Zambia continues to experience a huge burden of disease, mainly characterized by high prevalence and impact of communicable diseases, particularly, malaria, HIV and AIDS, Sexually Transmitted Infections (STIs), and Tuberculosis (TB), and high maternal, neonatal and child morbidity and mortality. The country is also faced with a rapidly rising burden of non- communicable diseases, including cancer diseases, mental health, diabetes mellitus, cardiovascular diseases (CVD), and trauma.

== Water supply and sanitation ==
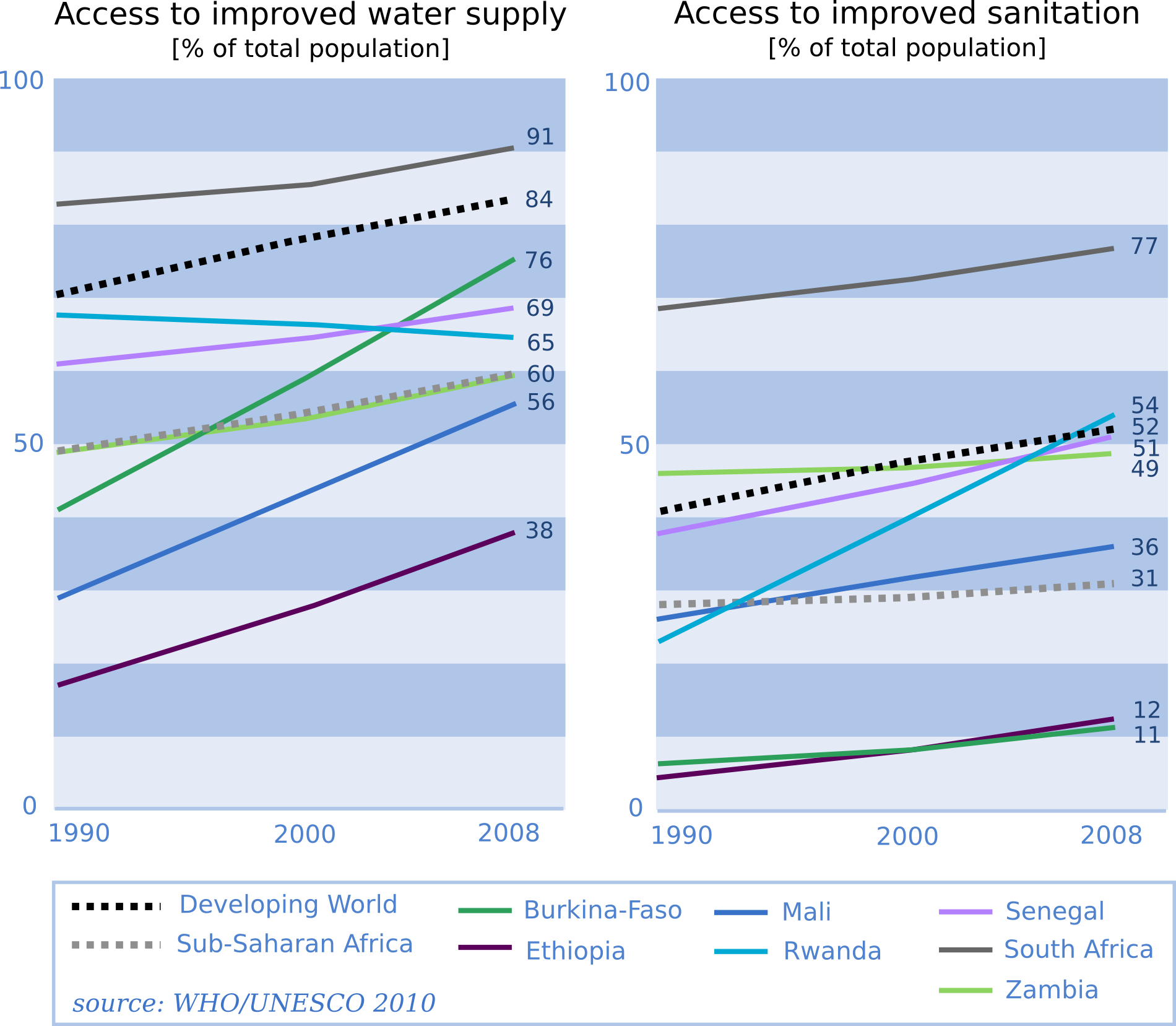
Access to improved water supply and sanitation, in 7 Sub-Saharan countries, from 1990 until 2008.

In 2010, 61% of the population of Zambia had access to an improved water source and 48% had access to adequate sanitation, according to UN data.

87% of urban areas had access to an improved source of water supply. In urban areas, 41% have access to water connections in their house or yard and 49% rely on water kiosks and standpipes. The share of those with access to house connections has actually declined, while the share of those served by kiosks has increased.

Water supply in urban areas is intermittent, with an average supply of 16 hours per day in 2010. Concerning sanitation, 29% of the urban population are connected to sewers and 30% are served by septic tanks or improved household-level latrines. While these figures are low, they are actually higher than the average access in Sub-Saharan Africa. In rural areas, 46% of the population had access to an improved water source in 2010. 43% of the rural population had access to adequate sanitation in 2010.

== International support ==
Since 2010, the Zambia UK Health Workforce Alliance has promoted global cooperation to support health in Zambia through the global forum HIFA-Zambia (Healthcare Information For All).

== Health status ==
=== Covid 19 ===
Zambia has recorded 208,161 cases of COVID-19 as of 16 September 2021 with 3636 deaths and 203,584 recoveries occurring since the beginning of the pandemic. As of 23 August 2021, there is a total of 503,707 vaccines that were administered. The country is a beneficiary of the WHO COVAX program. It has so far received donations of 228000 doses of Astrazeneca(COVISHILED) and 119 200 doses of AstraZeneca (AZ1222) from the Uk. In addition, under the COVAX initiative, the country has received 302 400 doses of J&J/Janssen donated by the United States of America. The vaccine is being rolled out at various centres throughout the country.

Levy Mwanawasa University Teaching Hospital is the main COVID-19 isolation center in the country.

=== Neonatal, Infant and Under 5 Mortality Rates ===
As of 2021, the infant mortality rate (the probability of dying between birth and age 1 per 1000 live births) is currently at 42.42% while the neonatal mortality rate stands at 23.28%. The countries under 5 mortality rate stands at 61.66%. However, there is a decrease from 2018 figures which stood at 43.36%, 23.62% and 63.29% for infant, neonatal and under 5 mortality rates respectively

=== Life expectancy ===
According to WHO health data for the republic of Zambia, life expectancy at birth has improved by 16.5 years from 44.5 years in 2000 to 61 years in 2021. Women life expectancy stands at 63.1 years and men at 58.7 years.

=== HIV/AIDS epidemic ===
Zambia has made great strides in allieviating the impact of the HIV epidemic. According to UNAIDS, annual HIV infections (for all ages) in Zambia have declined from 60,000 in 2010 to 51,000 in 2019. New infections among children 0–14 years declined from an estimated 10,000 in 2010 to 6,000 in 2019. There has been a decline in annual AIDS-related deaths from 24,000 in 2010 to 19,000 in 2019 a decrease of about 30 per cent. Despite the progress made, there is a disproportionate burden between males and females with women being affected more than their male counterparts. It is estimated that there are about 26 000 new infections of females above the age of 25 as compared to 19 000 for their male counterparts.

The Millennium Development Goal target for HIV was to keep HIV prevalence below 15% and it has been met.

=== Maternal and child healthcare ===
The 2010 maternal mortality rate was 470 per 100,000 births in Zambia. This is compared with 602.9 in 2008 and 594.2 in 1990. The under-5 mortality rate, per 1,000 births is 145 and the neonatal mortality as a percentage of under-5's mortality is 25. In Zambia, the number of midwives per 1,000 live births is 5 and the lifetime risk of death for pregnant women is 1 in 38.

Zambia may not attain its goals for reducing the Maternal Mortality ratio to 162/100,000 live births. For Under-5 Mortality rate and infant Mortality rate, the target is 63.3 and 35.7, respectively. In 2014, the Maternal Mortality ratio was 389 with Under-5 mortality rate being 75 and Infant mortality rate 45. Additionally, the percentage of 1-year-old children immunized against measles is 84.9%.

The 2010 maternal mortality rate per 100,000 births for Zambia is 470. This is compared with 602.9 in 2008 and 594.2 in 1990. The under-5 mortality rate, per 1,000 births is 145 and the neonatal mortality as a percentage of under 5's mortality is 25.

In Zambia the number of midwives per 1,000 live births is 5 and the lifetime risk of death for pregnant women is 1 in 38. Female genital mutilation (FGM), while not widespread, is practiced in parts of the country. According to the 2009 Zambia Sexual Behaviour Survey, 0.7% of women have undergone FGM. According to UNICEF, 45% of children under five years are stunted.

The government has made attempts to address women's health concerns and provide policies that give women greater opportunities in political life in the 2010s. A 2017 law established "Mother's Day" which allows every Zambian one day off from work per month to ease menstrual pain.

=== Adolescent Health ===
According to Zambia Demographic Health Survey 2013–14, about 29% of adolescent girls become pregnant by the age of 19 year. Teenage pregnancies reported among girls in grades 1–12 increased five times (from 3,663 in 2002 to 15,125 in 2015) according to the Ministry of General Education ZDHS statistics show that the adolescent fertility rate has slowly been declining, from 146 births in 2007 to 141 births per 1,000 adolescent girls in 2014, with teenage pregnancies in rural areas standing at 36% and urban areas at 20% of all pregnancies. About 32% of adolescents aged 15–17 and 60% of those aged 18–19 are sexually active in Zambia, and therefore face risks to HIV and other STIs, especially as only 40% of them report regular condom use. A related fact is that 42% of women aged 20–24 in Zambia report having been married by age 18.

Contraceptive prevalence rate for modern family planning methods among adolescent girls aged 15–19 was 10.2%, despite the rate having been estimated to have increased from 33% to 45% in the general population (ZDHS 2013–14). Adolescents also experience other health problems that include mental health, trauma, physical and sexual violence, non-communicable diseases, and alcohol and substance abuse.

Key challenges are the following in this category of health:

- Inadequate implementation of ADH strategies at lower levels
- Inadequate knowledge among adolescents of the existing health services
- Inadequate knowledge among health care workers of key adolescent health issues
- Inadequate HIV/SRH outreach services for adolescents
- Lack of ADH-specific indicators

Some of the strategies by the ministry of health to combat these challenges include the strengthening of policy and regulatory frameworks for provision and access of adolescent health services, including clear policies and guidelines on age of consent to key SRH and HIV services and a roll out an adaptive leadership targeting key stakeholders. Further MoH Zambia have embarked on a campaign to strengthen organization and multi-sectoral coordination for an efficient and effective harmonized response to delivering adolescent-responsive health services

In an attempt to provide a minimum adolescent health service platform in all districts of Zambia by 2021, Ministry of Health has scaled up pre-service and in-service adolescent health training of health workers as well as peer educators and their deployed them in adolescent-friendly spaces found at health facilities and communities.

==== Non-Communicable Diseases ====
Communicable diseases have received more attention as compared to non-communicable disease over the last decade. However, with the epidemiological change in the burden of disease, the Ministry of Health has begun to pay more attention to NCDs such as hypertension, diabetes and cancers.

The diagram below clears shows how over the years NCDs have become important, cardiovascular diseases and neoplasms moved from 7th and 8th rank in 1990 to 3rd and 5th rank in 2021 respectively. The country epidemiology is transitioning and will over the next decade be confronted by more NCDs compared to communicable disease . The MOH has made tremendous progress in ensuring the availability of medicines and medical supplies for the management and control of NCDs by including NCD medicines and supplies on the essential medicine list for Zambia. However, the essential medicine list does not exhaustively provide for all NCDs and conditions. In order to provide guidance to the fight against NCDs, the Government developed the NCD Strategic Plan 2011–2016, the National Cancer Control Strategic Plan 2022–2026, oral health standards of practice, and NCDs standard treatment guidelines. Notable achievements include establishment and expansion of the Cancer Diseases Hospital; establishment of a national cervical cancer screening programme; finalisation of the mental health and tobacco products control bill; initiation of the HPV vaccination programme for prevention of cervical cancer and accompanying scale-up plan; the commissioning of the cardiac catheterisation laboratory; and implementation of the Rheumatic Heart Disease study. Furthermore, national NCD risk factor surveys will be conducted in 2017 to establish baseline data.

Despite these achievements, key challenges remain and include:

- Lack of Policy and clear legal frameworks to support reductions in NCDs
- Uncoordinated multidisciplinary approach in control of NCD
- Inadequate human, financial, and material resources for NCD prevention and control
- Low level of public awareness of NCDs
- Lack of a communication strategy on NCDs
- Inadequate NCD diagnostic capacity at various levels of health care
- Erratic supply of NCD medicines and medical supplies

To mitigate these challenges various measures have been put in place such as strengthening and promoting active screening for NCDs at all levels, including within health facilities, schools, and communities, so as to generate demand for such services and strengthening subsequent case management. In addition, MoH is continuously developing and distributing information education and communication (IEC) materials for the various non communicable disease. Furthermore, a deliberate attempt to enhance leadership and governance for the social determinants and risk factors of NCDs has been done through the establishment of a national NCD coordinating committee with membership by all ministries.

=== Malaria ===
Malaria is the number one cause of hospitalization in Zambia and a major cause of morbidity and mortality, with pregnant women and young children at heightened risk. In 2016 there were over 4.8 million cases of malaria reported. Malaria occurs year-round, with the peak during the rainy season from November to April. Although the four main malaria parasite species are present in Zambia, Plasmodium falciparum accounts for 98% of all infections.

Malaria prevalence as reported by the Malaria Indicators Surveys decreased from 21.8% in 2006 to 14.9% in 2012. According to the Zambia Demographic and Health Survey, the percentage of children sleeping under insecticide-treated nets has increased from 6.5% in 2001/2 to 40.6% in 2014. In April 2017, Zambia launched its National Malaria Elimination Strategic Plan. This plan involves a two-pronged approach, targeting different areas based on transmission levels. For districts with more than 50 cases per 1,000 people, the focus is on reducing burden and health systems strengthening. In districts with fewer than 50 cases per 1,000 people, the key intervention focuses on surveillance.

== See also ==
- Healthcare in Zambia
