= Chilanga (constituency) =

Constituency of the National Assembly of Zambia

Chilanga was a constituency of the National Assembly of Zambia. It covered a rural area to the south and west of Lusaka, including the towns of Chilanga and Mwembeshi, in Chilanga District.

== List of MPs ==
Election year	MP	Party
1973	Elizabeth Mulenje	United National Independence Party
1978	Elizabeth Mulenje	United National Independence Party
Seat abolished
1991	Collins Hinamanjolo	Movement for Multi-Party Democracy
1994 (by-election)	Morgan Babuwa	Movement for Multi-Party Democracy
1996	Mann Muyuni	Movement for Multi-Party Democracy
2001	Cosmas Moono	United Party for National Development
2006	N’gandu Peter Magande	Movement for Multi-Party Democracy
2010 (by-election)	Cosmas Moono	United Party for National Development
2011	Keith Mukata	Movement for Multi-Party Democracy
2016	Keith Mukata	United Party for National Development
2018 (by-election)	Maria Langa	Patriotic Front
2021	Sipho Hlazo	United Party for National Development
Seat abolished (split into Chilanga North and Chilanga South)
