= Chilanga South =

National Assembly constituency in Zambia

Chilanga South is a constituency of the National Assembly of Zambia. It was created in 2026 when Chilanga constituency was split into two constituencies (Chilanga North and Chilanga South). It covers the southern part of Chilanga District, including Chilanga and Nakachenje.

== List of MPs ==
Election year	MP	Party
2026	Ngenda Situmbeko	United Party for National Development
