= Gwembe (constituency) =

Constituency of the National Assembly of Zambia

Gwembe is a constituency of the National Assembly of Zambia. It covers Gwembe and Munyumbwe in Gwembe District of Southern Province.

== List of MPs ==
Election year	MP	Party
Siavonga
1964	Maxwell Beyani	Zambian African National Congress
1968 (by-election)	Goodson Kanyama	Zambian African National Congress
Seat abolished (Gwembe split into Gwembe North and Gwembe South)
1973	Benard Hanyimbo	United National Independence Party
1978	Benard Hanyimbo	United National Independence Party
1983	Benard Hanyimbo	United National Independence Party
1988	Benard Hanyimbo	United National Independence Party
1991	Jacob Kantina	Movement for Multi-Party Democracy
1996	Clement Chiimbwe	Movement for Multi-Party Democracy
2001	Brian Ntundu	United Party for National Development
2006	Brian Ntundu	United Party for National Development
2011	Brian Ntundu	United Party for National Development
2016	Malungo Chisangano	United Party for National Development
2021	Tyson Simuzingili	United Party for National Development
2026	Tyson Simuzingili	United Party for National Development
