= Feira =

Feira may refer to:

- Feira (constituency), a parliamentary constituency in Zambia
- Feira (Santa Maria da Feira), a former civil parish in Portugal
- Luangwa, Zambia, a town in Zambia formerly known as Feira
