= Luangwa =

Luangwa may refer to:

- Luangwa River, the major river of eastern Zambia
- Luangwa Bridge, which crosses the Luangwa River
- Luangwa River (Mporokoso), a tributary of the Kalungwishi River in Mporokoso District, Zambia;
- Luangwa, Zambia, a town in Zambia at the confluence of the Luangwa and Zambezi Rivers, and previously called Feira;
- Luangwa District of eastern Lusaka Province, Zambia, of which Luangwa town is the headquarters;
- South Luangwa National Park
- North Luangwa National Park
- Luangwa Basin, a geologic feature in Zambia comprising a series of fossiliferous strata
- Luangwa, a genus of cynodonts
