= Feira (constituency) =

Constituency of the National Assembly of Zambia

Feira is a constituency of the National Assembly of Zambia. It covers the towns of Jeki, Kapoche, Katemo, Katondwe and Luangwa (previously known as Feira) in Luangwa District of Lusaka Province.

== List of MPs ==
Election year	MP	Party
1973	Felix Luputa	United National Independence Party
1978	Stanislaus Nyamkandeka	United National Independence Party
1983	Stanislaus Nyamkandeka	United National Independence Party
1988	Stanislaus Nyamkandeka	United National Independence Party
1991	Stanislaus Nyamkandeka	United National Independence Party
1996	Fidelis Mando	Movement for Multi-Party Democracy
2001	Patrick Ngoma	Movement for Multi-Party Democracy
2006	Charles Shawa	Movement for Multi-Party Democracy
2011	Patrick Ngoma	Movement for Multi-Party Democracy
2013 (by-election)	Patrick Ngoma	Patriotic Front
2016	Stephen Miti	Independent
2021	Emmanuel Tembo	Patriotic Front
2026	Emmanuel Tembo	National Reconciliation Party for Unity and Prosperity
