= Marcelo Jacobs-Lorena =

Brazilian-American molecular entomologist

Academic background
- Education: BA, 1964, University of São Paulo; MSc, 1967, Osaka University; PhD, 1972, Massachusetts Institute of Technology
- Thesis: Characterization of extraribosomal globin messenger RNA and human histone messenger RNA (1972)

Academic work
- Institutions: Johns Hopkins Bloomberg School of Public Health; Case Western Reserve University
- Main interests: Mosquitoes as Vectors for the Malaria Parasite

Marcelo Jacobs-Lorena is a Brazilian-American molecular entomologist. He is a professor in the department of molecular microbiology and immunology at Johns Hopkins Bloomberg School of Public Health. In 2002, his team loaded mosquitoes with a modified gene so that their guts produce a substance that kills off Plasmodium.

== Early life and education ==
Jacobs-Lorena completed his Bachelor of Arts degree at University of São Paulo and his Master's degree at Osaka University before moving to North America for his Ph.D. at the Massachusetts Institute of Technology.

== Career ==
Following his PhD, Jacobs-Lorena joined the faculty in the Department of Genetics at Case Western Reserve University (CWRU) in 1977. As a member of the faculty, he made a groundbreaking discovery in curing malaria by loading mosquitoes with a modified gene so that their guts produce a substance that kills off plasmodium. They encoded peptides to block receptors and salivary glands in the mosquito's gut so that the plasmodium can't replicate in the insect and infect humans when the mosquito bites. Following this discovery, Jacobs-Lorena was recruited to Johns Hopkins University (JHU) as they had received an anonymous donation towards malaria research. He subsequently became a professor in the Department of Molecular Microbiology and Immunology and the Malaria Research Institute at the Bloomberg School of Public Health (JHMRI).

Upon joining the JHMRI, Jacobs-Lorena and colleague Eappen G. Abraham began developing a transgenic mosquito immune to the plasmodium parasite. With the SPRN6 gene permanently activated, a mosquito could help disrupt malaria transmission to humans. His continued research in this field led him to determine that transgenic mosquitoes lived longer and produced more eggs than their non-modified counterparts. These findings suggested that malaria could be introduced into nature to replace malaria-carrying mosquitoes as long as the transgenic mosquitoes produced more offspring and lived longer. Later in 2007, Jacobs-Lorena and colleagues identified a sugar in mosquitoes that allows the malaria-causing parasite to attach itself to the mosquito's gut. By reducing the level of sugar in the mosquito, his research team determined they could prevent 95 percent of the parasites in the mosquito from attaching to the gut. His efforts in developing genetically modified mosquitoes earned him recognition from Scientific American as a researcher whose accomplishments in research, business or policymaking demonstrate outstanding technological leadership.

From 2009 to 2012, Jacobs-Lorena made numerous new discoveries in mosquitoes to help eliminate malaria. In 2009, his research team became the first to identify the molecular components that enable plasmodium to infect the salivary glands of the Anopheles mosquito. Later, he announced that their genetically engineered mosquito had out-survived the unaltered, malaria-friendly mosquitoes after nine generations. Jacobs-Lorena was later elected a Fellow of the American Association for the Advancement of Science for "distinguished contributions to the field of insect vector biology, particularly malaria parasite/mosquito interactions and genetic modification of mosquito vector competence." In 2012, his research team began focusing on the bacteria that live symbiotically in the mosquitoes’ guts with the goal of modifying them to produce compounds that interfere with the parasite's development. In order to continue keeping track of their Anopheles mosquitoes, Jacobs-Lorena and other scientists at JHMRI built a facility in Macha, Zambia. This facility thus allowed them to more accurately evaluate novel insecticides, attractants, and, mosquitoes genetically modified to be resistant to malaria.

In 2017, Jacobs-Lorena helped his colleague Sibao Wang effectively introduce the Serratia bacterium strain (AS1) into mosquito populations. AS1 was genetically engineered for the secretion of anti-Plasmodium effector proteins, and the recombinant strains inhibit the development of Plasmodium falciparum in mosquitoes. Following this discovery, Jacobs-Lorena's research team began trying to prevent cross-species jumps by inserting the antimalarial genes directly into the genomes of the mosquitoes themselves. In 2021, Jacobs-Lorena received the Shikani/El Hibri Prize for Discovery and Innovation for a major scientific contribution with significant potential for public health or clinical impact.
