= Jeki Airstrip =

Airport in Zambia

- IATA: JEK; ICAO: none

Summary
- Airport type: Public
- Serves: Jeki, Zambia
- Location: Jeki
- Coordinates: 15°38′00″S 029°36′14″E
- Interactive map of Jeki; Airstrip

The Jeki Airstrip (IATA code: JEK) is a small commercial airport in Jeki, Luangwa District, Zambia.

== Background ==
The airport has seasonal, domestic airline services.

It lies in the Lower Zambezi National Park just north of the Zambezi River, which forms Zambia's border with Zimbabwe.

== Airline and destinations ==
=== Passenger ===
Airlines	Destinations	Refs
Proflight Zambia operated by ProCharter	Seasonal: Lusaka (via Royal), Mfuwe, Royal	
