= Aaron Mujajati =

Zambian physician (born 1975)

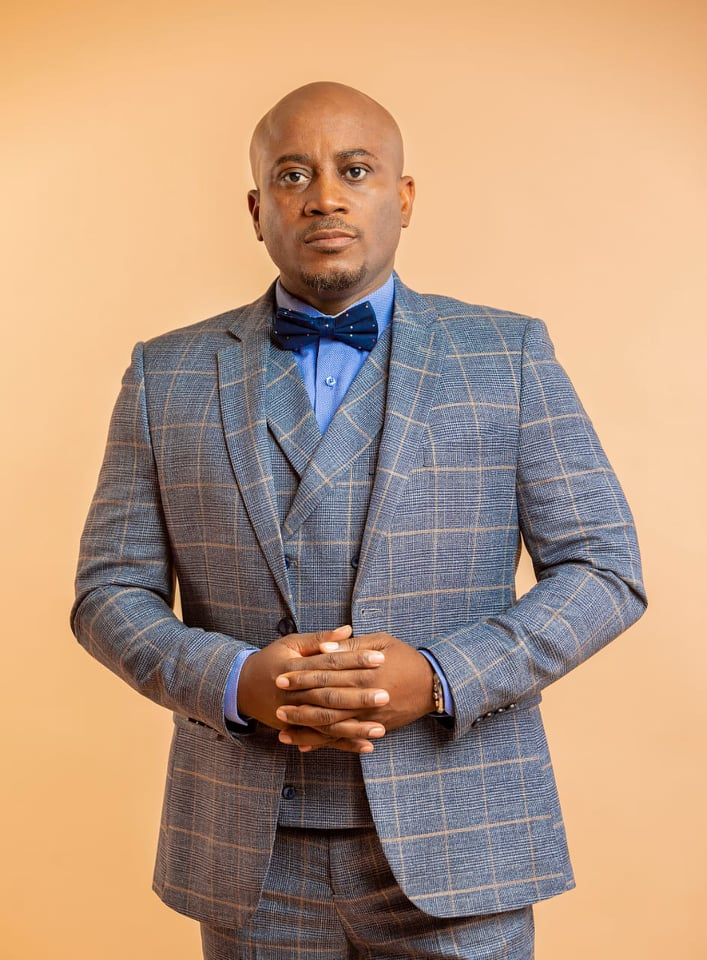
- Born: 21 April 1975 (age 51); Lusaka, Zambia
- Education: University of Zambia; University of Lusaka
- Occupations: Physician, entrepreneur, author
- Employers: Carepeak Specialist Clinic; University of Zambia; University Teaching Hospital; Pinewood Preparatory School
- Children: 4

Aaron Dzimbanhete Mujajati (born 21 April 1975), is a Zambian physician, author and entrepreneur. Mujajati holds a Masters of Business Administration in Healthcare Management from the University of Lusaka and a Masters of Medicine in Internal Medicine from the University of Zambia.

== Early life and education ==
Mujajati was raised in Chaisa Compound of Lusaka as a third born in a family of 10 by a Zimbabwean Shona father, and a Zambian Lozi mother.

Mujajati attended Emmasdale Primary School from 1982 to 1990. He then proceeded to Matero Boys Secondary School in Lusaka for his junior secondary school education. From 1993 to 1995, he attended Hillcrest Secondary School in the tourist city of Livingstone, Zambia where he completed his senior secondary school education.

For his tertiary education, Mujajati attended the University of Zambia, between 1997 and 2005 where he graduated with a Bachelor of Human Biology degree and Bachelor of Surgery and Bachelor of Medicine degree. He then did further studies at the same university and graduated with a Master of Medicine in Internal Medicine degree.

In 2017, he graduated from the University of Lusaka with a Masters of Business Administration in Healthcare Management degree.

== Publications ==
Mujajati is co-author of the book The Medical Law and Ethics with lawyer Joseph Chirwa. Mujajati also co-wrote a paper entitled Therapeutic Outcomes in AIDS-Associated Kaposi's Sarcoma Patients on Antiretroviral Therapy Treated with Chemotherapy at Two Tertiary Hospitals in Lusaka, Zambia.

== Medical career ==
After medical school, Mujajati joined the Department of Internal Medicine at University Teaching Hospital Adult hospital. He served as the president of the Zambia Medical Association for two terms of office.

On 18 September 2017, Mujajati was appointed as Registrar of the Health Profession council of Zambia (HPCZ). On 10 November 2018 Mujajati banned the Copperbelt University from offering three programmes in the School in Medicine (Bachelor of Medicine, Bachelor of Surgery and Bachelor of Dental Surgery) because of gross over-enrolment of students and inadequate lecturers . A month earlier, Mujajati ordered the shutting down of five (5) health facilities in Luanshya, Kitwe and Ndola on the Copperbelt Province for various violations of the laws of Zambia.

On 17 January 2017, the Civil Service Commission of Zambia recalled Mujajati from secondment as HPCZ Registrar and redeployed him to Ndola Central Hospital. Some commentators suggested that the sacking of Mujajati was politically motivated. On 9 May 2019, Mujajati asked the court to re-instate him as Health Professions Council of Zambia Registrar. and compensation He also sued for full benefits and damages for wrongful dismissal and unfair termination of his contract of employment. On 24 May 2019, Mujajati sued the health Minister and the state claiming damages for defamation of character over allegations that he was irrational and inhuman for closing down health institutions.

Mujajati has advocated for the legalisation of growing medicinal marijuana and for quality and equitable health services to the poor and vulnerable. He has also raised awareness about medical conditions such as fistula, breast cancer and intersex.

== Entrepreneurship career ==
Mujajati runs his own medical practice named Carepeak Specialist Clinic in Lusaka. He has also run businesses in transport and insurance.

== Personal life ==
Mujajati is married to a Zambian medical practitioner Ushmaben Patel-Mujajati, whose parents come from India. The two have four daughters.
