= 2022 census =

2022 census may refer to:

- 2022 Alberta municipal censuses
- 2022 Bangladeshi census
- 2022 Brazilian census
- 2022 Dominican Republic census
- 2022 census of Ireland
- 2022 Scottish census
- 2022 South African census
- 2022 Zambian census
