= Healthcare in Zambia =

In 2014, public expenditure on health in Zambia was 2.8% of GDP, among the lowest in southern Africa.

== Health infrastructure ==
There are two ministries in health care delivery: the Ministry of Health and the Ministry of Community Development, Mother and Child Health that provide information about health and deliver health services. In 2010, public expenditure on healthcare was 3.4% of the GDP - among the lowest in southern Africa.

=== Health facilities ===
The health service delivery system has three levels:

- 1st level: Community-level health services; These include District hospitals, Health Centers and Health Posts.
- 2nd level: Provincial or General hospitals.
- 3rd level: Central or specialist hospitals.

==== Roles of the Ministries ====
The Ministry of Community Development, Mother and Child was created following the shift in government policy in 2013 that brought about streamlining of the Ministry of Health, thus re-aligning of Primary Health care Services; all General hospitals, health centers and health posts fall under this ministry. On the other hand, the Ministry of Health also has a role to supervise Provincial Health offices, 2nd level hospitals and 3rd level hospitals.

==== Health facilities ====
In 2012, there were approximately 1762 health care facilities in Zambia. The largest health facility, the University Teaching Hospital serves both as a specialist hospital and a training site for future health workers. It is a 3rd level hospital. Other 3rd level hospitals include Kitwe Central Hospital, Ndola Central Hospital, Arthur Davison Children's Hospital, Cancer Disease Hospital and Chainama Mental Hospital.

The 2nd and 1st level hospitals throughout Zambia include: Levy Mwanawasa General Hospital, Chipata General Hospital, Konkola Mine Hospital, Lubwe Mission Hospital, Macha Mission Hospital, Mtendere Mission Hospital, Mukinge Mission Hospital, Mwandi Mission Hospital, Nchanga North Hospital, Chikankata Salvation Army Hospital, Kalene Mission Hospital, St Francis Hospital, and Luke's Mission Hospital. Others are Lewanika General Hospital, Kabwe General Hospital.There are very few health facilities in rural or remote places in Zambia, where most communities rely on small government-run community health centers and rural health posts.

In 2013, the government embarked on a project to upgrade a number of health facilities in different parts of the country and JICA ( Japan International Cooperation Agency) signed a grand agreement to provide aid.

Summary of number of Health facilities in Zambia in 2012

Province	3rd level	2nd level	1st level	UHC	RHC	HP	Total
Lusaka	3	1	15	182	51	42	294
Copperbelt	3	4	11	148	55	29	250
Central	0	2	8	29	129	26	204
Luapula	0	1	6	3	125	10	145
Eastern	0	2	7	5	143	49	206
Northern	0	2	2	8	102	34	148
North-western	1	1	10	6	135	11	163
Southern	0	4	11	19	178	41	253
Western	0	1	10	5	144	34	194
Muchinga	0	1	4	4	69	21	99

UHC-Urban health center, RHC-Rural health center, HP-Health Post

== Hospitals ==
In Zambia, there are hospitals throughout the country which include: Levy Mwanawasa General Hospital, Chipata General Hospital, TMS Medical Services, Kitwe Central Hospital, Konkola Mine Hospital, Lubwe Mission Hospital, Maacha Hospital, Mtendere Mission Hospital, Mukinge Mission Hospital, Mwandi Mission Hospital, Nchanga North Hospital, Chikankata Salvation Army Hospital, Kalene Mission Hospital, St Francis Hospital, and St Luke's Mission Hospital.

The University Teaching Hospital serves as both a hospital and a training site for future health workers. There are very few hospitals in rural or remote places in Zambia, where most communities rely on small government-run community health centres and rural health posts.

== Maternity ==
=== See also ===
- List of hospitals in Zambia
