= Chilanga North =

National Assembly constituency in Zambia

Chilanga North is a constituency of the National Assembly of Zambia. It was created in 2026 when Chilanga constituency was split into two constituencies (Chilanga North and Chilanga South). It covers the northern part of Chilanga District, including Mwembeshi and Lusaka West.

== List of MPs ==
Election year	MP	Party
2026	Sipho Hlazo	United Party for National Development
