= John H. Clark =

John H. Clark may refer to:

- John Harrison Clark (c. 1860–1927), Cape Colony adventurer who ruled much of southern Zambia
- John Heaviside Clark (died 1863), Scottish aquatint engraver and painter of seascapes and landscapes
- John Howard Clark (died 1878), editor of The South Australian Register, 1870–1877
- John Clark (boxer) (1849–1922), Irish-American boxer
- John H. Clark House, a historic residence in Mechanicsburg, Ohio named for a local John H. Clark
