= Keith Mukata =

Zambian lawyer and former politician

Member of the National Assembly for Chilanga
- In office 2011–2018
- President: Michael Sata (2011–2014), Edgar Lungu (2015–2018)
- Succeeded by: Maria Langa

Deputy Minister of Justice
- In office 2015–2016
- President: Edgar Lungu

Personal details
- Born: Keith Mukata Zambia
- Party: Patriotic Front (until 2016), United Party for National Development (2016–2018)
- Spouse: Charity Lumpa (separated)
- Education: University of Zambia
- Profession: Lawyer

Keith Mukata is a Zambian lawyer and former politician who served as Member of Parliament for Chilanga Constituency from 2011 until 2018. He previously served as Deputy Minister of Justice under President Edgar Lungu.

== Education ==
Mukata trained as a lawyer. He is a graduate of the University of Zambia, where he studied law.

== Political career ==
Mukata was elected as Member of Parliament for Chilanga in the 2011 general elections on the under the Patriotic Front (PF). He was later appointed as Deputy Minister of Justice in President Edgar Lungu's administration.

In 2016, Mukata switched parties and recontested the Chilanga seat under the United Party for National Development (UPND), winning re-election.

== Criminal conviction ==
In May 2017, Mukata was arrested in connection with the shooting death of a security guard at his law firm. He was later charged and found guilty of murder. In February 2018, he was convicted and sentenced to death by the High Court of Zambia.

== Release ==
In May 2021, President Edgar Lungu pardoned Mukata as part of a Presidential Amnesty for selected inmates.

== Personal life ==
Mukata was married to Charity Lumpa, a Zambian business executive. Their relationship became a subject of media scrutiny during and after his conviction.

== See also ==
- Politics of Zambia
- National Assembly of Zambia
