= Luangwa, Zambia =

Luangwa (Feira)
- Town
- Location of Luangwa in Zambia
- Coordinates: 15°37′S 30°23′E
- Country: Zambia
- Province: Lusaka Province
- District: Luangwa District
- Elevation: 380 m (1,250 ft)
- Time zone: UTC+2 (SAST)
- Climate: BSh

Luangwa is a town in Zambia, at the confluence of the Luangwa and Zambezi Rivers, which was called Feira until 1964. It is headquarters of a district of the same name in Lusaka Province.

Feira was probably the first European settlement in Zambia, but the dates are not well documented. What is documented is that the Portuguese first settled on the opposite bank of the Luangwa at Zumbo in Mozambique in the early 18th century, and by 1720 some had settled in Feira. The town was abandoned again by 1856, when it was visited by the explorer David Livingstone and described as completely ruined. It was resettled in 1887 by John Harrison Clark, who lived there until 1895.

After Zambia achieved independence the name of the town was changed to Luangwa as part of a preference for indigenous rather than colonial names, although the name was resurrected in 1973 for the Feira parliamentary constituency covering the town. It has only one road in or out which connects to the Great East Road about 100 km north. There are no bridges in the area over the Luangwa or Zambezi, nor regular ferry services, but local people will take visitors across in small boats.

The town's location is strategically important. The Luangwa forms Zambia's border with Mozambique and the Zambezi forms its border with Zimbabwe. In the Zimbabwe-Rhodesia War, the Mozambican War of Independence and Mozambican Civil War it was the scene of guerrilla activity. Zambia's practical support for nationalist guerrillas led to some incursions into its territory by Rhodesian and Portuguese forces in pursuit of them.

Luangwa District is far from the famous Luangwa national parks, but includes spectacular scenery and wildlife of its own. The Lower Zambezi National Park west of the town is a rugged wilderness on the Zambezi Escarpment and the lower Luangwa valley includes unspoilt scenery and wildlife habitats.

== See also ==
- Luangwa River
- Zambezi River
- Lower Zambezi National Park
