= Mount Makulu Research Station =

Agricultural research station in Zambia

Coordinates: 15°33′S 28°11′E

The Mount Makulu Research Station is an agricultural research station situated near Chilanga, c. 15 km south of Lusaka, Zambia.

It was started in the 1950s by the British Government after the Second World War, while Zambia was a British colony. During the 1950s and 1960s Mount Makulu was home to an expatriate community of notably English and Dutch residents and to the local African population. Named after a local hill, called Mount Makulu, it was involved in various research activities related to, for example, grasses and silage. It was a thriving if small community with a local tennis club built by the residents. The nearest town is Chilanga, which has local schools and whose main industry is the manufacture of cement.

After Zambia gained its independence from Britain under President Kenneth Kaunda in 1964, Mount Makulu continued as an agricultural research station as a part of the Department of Agriculture, Ministry of Agriculture, Food and Fisheries of Zambia.

The Mount Makulu Research Station is also the headquarters of the Zambia Agriculture Research Institute (ZARI).
