= Chilanga Cement =

Company

Chilanga Cement Plc
- Company type: Public
- Traded as: Lusaka Stock Exchange:CHIL
- Industry: Manufacturing
- Founded: 1949
- Headquarters: Chilanga, Zambia
- Key people: Jimmy J Khan (CEO); Choolwe Natala Lungu (CFO-Acting); Muna Hantuba (chairman)
- Products: Cement; Cement clinker
- Revenue: ▲ZMW 2,113,725,000; (U$ 120.8 million)(2021)
- Net income: ▲ZMW 291,090,000; (U$ 16.6 million)(2021)
- Total assets: ▲ZMW 1,760,344,000; (U$ 100.5 million)(2021)
- Total equity: ▲ZMW 1,525,860,000; (U$ 87.2 million)(2021)
- Website: https://www.lafarge.co.zm/

Chilanga Cement is a company of Zambia. Chilanga is principally a cement company, producing cement and cement clinker. The company also sales aggregates from a quarry it operates in Chilanga. The company is headquartered in Chilanga which is close to Lusaka, the national capital.

== History ==
The company was founded in 1949, privatized in 1957, nationalized in 1973, and was the first large state-owned company to be privatized (or re-privatized, as it were) in 1994. Chilanga Cement was the first company to be listed on the Lusaka Stock Exchange, in 1995. The company was the major supplier for the construction of Kariba Dam.

== Operations ==
The former Chilanga Cement, now Lafarge Zambia Plc, operates two major facilities, one in Chilanga and one in Ndola. The Chilanga facility had completed the construction and commissioning of a new facility in 2008.

Chilanga Cement operates 4 depots, one in Mpulungu, the others in Chipata, Kasumbalesa and Livingstone.

Lafarge Zambia's largest customers are the construction firms engaged on Government projects like construction of roads, dams and bridges. The company also exports cement and clinker to nearby countries, including The Democratic Republic of Congo (DRC), Malawi, Zimbabwe and Burundi.

In 2020, the company recorded 225,000 tonnes of Clinker export sales and 740,000 tonnes of Cement sales, 293,000 of which was sold to export markets.

== Financials ==
For the fiscal (and calendar) year 2021, Chilanga Cement reported a net income of ZMW 291,090,000. The annual revenue was ZMW 2,113,725,000.

Year	Revenue (ZMW)	Net income (ZMW)	Assets (ZMW)	Equity (ZMW)
2020	1,693,146,000	363,035,000	1,880,081,000	1,636,876,000
2021	2,113,725,000	291,090,000	1,760,344,000	1,525,860,000

== Ownership ==
In 2021 the majority shareholders of Lafarge Zambia Plc (Pan African Cement Co. Ltd. and Financier Lafarge) sold their 75% in the Company to Huaxin (Hainan) Investment Co. Ltd., a company owned by Huaxin Cement Co. Ltd. (Huaxin), leading to the change of trading name of Lafarge Zambia Plc to Chilanga Cement Plc.

The shares of stock of Chilanga Cement Plc are listed on the Lusaka Stock Exchange (LuSE), where they trade under the symbol: CHIL. As of 14 April 2022, Chilanga Cement is currently one of the most valuable stocks on the LuSE with a market capitalization of ZMW 2.68 billion.

== See also ==
- Economy of Zambia
- Cement Production by Country
- Lusaka Stock Exchange
