= Chainama Hills Mental Hospital =

Zambian public referral hospital

- Location of Lusaka

Geography
- Location: Zambia
- Coordinates: 15°24′05.8″S 28°21′13.4″E

Organisation
- Affiliated university: University of North Carolina; University of Zambia

Services
- Emergency department: Yes
- Beds: 210

Helipads
- Helipad: No

History
- Founded: 1955; 71 years ago

Links
- Other links: List of hospitals in Zambia

Chainama Hills Mental Hospital is a third level hospital located in Lusaka, Zambia, established in 1955. Built back in the colonial era as an insane asylum, initially it was intended for British colonial officers treatment and subsequently for indigenous patients. It offers medical care, treatment and re-socializing for people with psychiatric problems. Being the biggest mental health hospital, the faculties offer mental care, promote mental health and restore the dignity of patients in the country. It aims at providing care, rehabilitation, and reintegration of patients into society.

== History ==
The hospital was established in 1955 and has undergone significant developments since its establishment. In 1964, Zambia gained independence, and the hospital began serving local patients. In the 1970s, the facilities and services were expanded, and in the 1980s, community-based mental health services were introduced. In the 1990s, mental health services were decentralized to district hospitals. The hospital collaborates with various organizations, including the Ministry of Health, World Health Organization (WHO), United Nations Development Programme (UNDP), and non-governmental organizations such as Mental Health Zambia.

The current leadership includes Dr. Caroline Nyakaloma, Hospital Superintendent, and Dr. Maureen Moyo, Deputy Superintendent.

The hospital faces stigma due to a misconstrued name, leading to fear, isolation, and discrimination against mental health patients and staff. Despite its mission to provide quality care, the hospital struggles with a negative image. Dr. George Tafuna advocated for changing the narrative and educating the public about the true meaning of "Chainama" (I'm well, mother).

=== Location ===
The hospital is situated in the Chainama Hills area of Lusaka, Zambia, spanning over 100 hectares of land.

== See also ==
- List of hospitals in Zambia
