= Senior Chieftainess Nkomeshya Mukamambo II =

Senior Chieftainess Nkomeshya Mukamambo II (Elizabeth Mulenje) is the chieftainship of the Soli people of Chongwe District in Lusaka Province. She has been a chieftainess in the area since 1976. She is the second female Nkomeshya since 19th century Mukamambo I who is mythologized as having spiritual powers that allowed her to change her physical form and veil her people to protect them from enemies.

== Traditional roles ==
As Chieftainess, Nkomeshya plays the role of primary rainmaker during the annual Chakwela Makumba traditional ceremony held annually in October. During the Chakwela Makumbi, literally translating to "pulling down the clouds", Chieftainess Makumbi pleads with the ancestral spirits to bless her people with rain. Among her many tasks during the event, Chieftainess Nkomeshya kicks off the farming season by being the first to plant a seed.

== Political life ==
Shortly after Chieftainess Nkomeshya ascended to the throne, she took up leadership roles in politics as a member of the United National Independence Party (UNIP). During her time in the party, she was a member of the Central Committee and the UNIP Women's League. She also served as Minister of State of Home Affairs from 1979 to 1986.

In 2013 she was elected as the chairperson of the House of Chiefs, taking over from Chief Madzimawe of the Ngoni people of Chipata District in Eastern Province. This made her the first woman elected to serve as chairperson since the position was created in 1965.

== Areas of work ==
Chieftainess Nkomeshya has been commended for her work in the fight to end child marriages in her area.
