= Malungo Chisangano =

Zambian politician and First Deputy Speaker of the National Assembly

Malungo A. Chisangano

First Deputy Speaker of the National Assembly of Zambia
- Incumbent
- Assumed office September 2021
- Preceded by: Nelly Mutti

Member of Parliament for Gwembe
- In office August 2016 – August 2021
- Preceded by: Brian Ntundu
- Succeeded by: Tyson Simuzingili

Personal details
- Born: January 29, 1966 (age 60)
- Party: United Party for National Development
- Education: Western Cape University, South Africa
- Profession: Politician, Public Health Expert

Malungo A. Chisangano (born 29 January 1966) is a Zambian politician currently serving as the First Deputy Speaker of the National Assembly of Zambia. She previously represented Gwembe constituency as a Member of Parliament from 2016 to 2021 under the United Party for National Development.

== Professional career ==
Before joining Parliament, Chisangano worked in project planning, design, implementation, and monitoring for various international organizations including Catholic Relief Services, CARE International, and Concern Worldwide. She specialized in sustainable community health, primary health care, HIV/AIDS, child health, nutrition, and sexual and reproductive health programs.

Between 1987 and 1990, she managed nine clinics and two mine hospitals as a nutritionist with the Zambia Consolidated Copper Mines (ZCCM) at the Mufulira Division.

== Political career ==
Chisangano was elected to the Zambian National Assembly in August 2016 representing Gwembe Constituency on the United Party for National Development ticket.

In September 2021, she was elected First Deputy Speaker of the National Assembly, serving as an auxiliary presiding officer supporting the Speaker in maintaining parliamentary order and decorum.

She is Chairperson of the Committee on Privileges and Absences, which examines parliamentary privileges and immunities. She also serves as Vice Chairperson of the House Business Committee, responsible for scheduling parliamentary business.

During her term as MP for Gwembe, she served on the Committee on National Security and Foreign Affairs and the Committee on Health, Community Development and Social Services.

She is also active in promoting women's rights and gender equality within the Parliament.

== See also ==
- National Assembly of Zambia
