= Arthur Davison Children's Hospital =

Zambian public referral hospital

- Location of Ndola

Geography
- Location: Zambia
- Coordinates: 12°58′08″S 28°37′57″E

Organisation
- Affiliated university: University of North Carolina; University of Zambia

Services
- Emergency department: Yes
- Beds: 250

Helipads
- Helipad: No

History
- Founded: 1924; 102 years ago

Links
- Other links: List of hospitals in Zambia

Arthur Davison Children's Hospital is a public, 3rd level hospital located in Ndola, Zambia that was established in 1924. Created by the Mine Workers Union as a minor clinic it served only children who were children of the miners. The clinic blossomed 1933 when it became a hospital named after Arthur Davison – a noted mine manager who championed for care for minors.

The hospital serves the local community as well as the surrounding areas with availability to children with special needs such as those between 0-12 years old. The medical facility offers patient-centered services to kids. The hospital focuses at becoming an exemplary pediatric care center not only within Zambia but also beyond by leading in terms related to healthcare provision, learning, and research. Its aim includes providing accessible, equitable, and sustainable healthcare services to children, ensuring their optimal growth and development.

== History ==
The hospital established in 1924. In the 1950s, specialized pediatric services were introduced, and in the 1980s, the hospital underwent expansion and modernization. In the 2000s, partnerships with international organizations were established for capacity building and resource development. Notable individuals associated with the hospital include Arthur Davison, a prominent mine manager and healthcare advocate, and Dr. Mary Phiri, a pioneering pediatrician and former hospital director.

The hospital collaborates with various organizations, including the World Health Organization (WHO), UNICEF, and non-governmental organizations such as Save the Children and Doctors Without Borders. The current leadership includes Dr. Precious Phiri, Hospital Director, and Dr. Chimwemwe Tembo, Deputy Director.

== See also ==
- List of hospitals in Zambia
