= Medical Journal of Zambia =

- Discipline: General medicine
- Language: English
- Edited by: John S. Kachimba

Publication details
- History: 1967–present
- Publisher: Zambia Medical Association
- Frequency: Quarterly
- Open access: Yes

Standard abbreviations
- ISO 4: Med. J. Zamb.
- NLM: Med J Zambia

Indexing
- CODEN: MJZAAG
- ISSN: 0047-651X

Links
- Journal homepage

The Medical Journal of Zambia is an open access peer-reviewed medical journal that publishes papers in all aspects of healthcare science and policy such as (Internal Medicine, Surgery, Paediatrics and Obstetrics & Gynaecology) and their subspecialties, basic sciences, public health, social medicine and medical politics. The journal also welcomes contributions from experienced individuals describing the way they deal with particular problems. It is published quarterly by the Zambia Medical Association. Its editor-in-chief is John S. Kachimba, a medical superintendent and consultant urologist at the University Teaching Hospital in Lusaka. This journal is part of the African Journal Partnership Project supported by Thomson Reuters. The journal is part of a broader UNESCO-supported initiative to promote Open Access publication in Zambia and improve the visibility of Zambian science.
