= Ng'andu Peter Magande =

Zambian politician

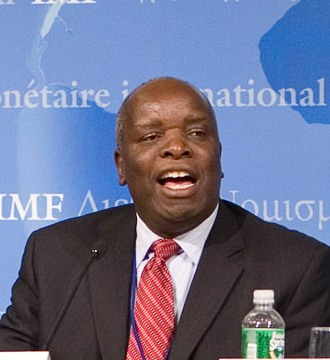
Ng'andu Peter Magande in 2007

Ng'andu Peter Magande, was a Zambian politician and economist. He served as the Minister of Finance and National Planning of the Republic of Zambia from 2003 to 2008. He also served as a Member of Parliament for Chilanga Constituency from 2006 until 2010 and the Chairman of the MMD Party Committee on Economy and Finance.

Magande was born July 5, 1947, in Namaila, in the Mazabuka district of the Southern Province in Zambia.

== Career ==
He attended Namaila, Chikankata and Munali Schools before going to the University of Zambia, where he graduated in Economics and Mathematics in 1970. He began his career in 1971 as a cadet in the Zambia civil service, and then left for Makerere University in Kampala, Uganda, where he did a Master of Science degree in Agricultural Economics. From 1972 - 1980 he was an economist in the Ministry of Rural Development, He was then successively Under Secretary for Economics of the Zambia National Service, and Director of Budget in the Ministry of Finance. From 1983–1986, he served as Permanent Secretary for the Ministries of Commerce, Industry & Trade, Ministry of Decentralisation (Central Province), Ministry of Agriculture & Rural Development, and the National Commission for Development Planning.

He was reassigned into the parastatal sector from government service, from December 1986 - March 1991, he was Managing Director, Lima Bank Limited, which was then, a newly incorporated development bank. He then became Executive Director, Industrial Development Corporation of Zambia (INDECO), and from November 1991 - May 1993, Managing Director, Zambia National Commercial Bank, the largest commercial bank in Zambia; following that, Executive Director of the Zambia Industrial & Mining Company Ltd (ZIMCO).

In May 1994, he was retired from the Civil service and joined the private sector as a consultant. In June 1994, he returned to government service as a Project Coordinator to the Ministry of Agriculture, Food and Fisheries under technical assistance by the African Development Bank. From July 1996 until February 2000, he served as the Secretary-General of the African, Caribbean and Pacific Group of States (ACP), headquartered in Brussels, Belgium. Between 2000 and 2003, he undertook consultancy work for various organisations, among them, SADC, COMESA, AU, UNDP, MEFMI, Maxwell Stamp, IMANI and the Governments of Zambia and Malawi. Between July 2011 and May 2012, he was a member of a 23-person global think tank established by the Centre for Global Development (CGD) based in Washington DC USA on "The Future of the International Development Association (IDA)" of the World Bank.

== Death ==
Ng'andu Peter Magande died on 23 October 2023, aged 76.

== Memberships and honours ==
- Fellow of the Economic Development Institute (FEDI) of the World Bank.
- Member and past Chairman (1995–1996) of the Economics Association of Zambia (EAZ).
- Vice-Chairman of the Board of the European Centre for Development Policy Management (ECDPM), 1996-2000.
- Member of the American Management Institute International 1996-2000.
- Member of the Governance Panel of Consultants of the Department for International Development (DFID) of the United Kingdom Government.
- Commander of the Order of the Republic of Benin (COB) in recognition of service to the ACP-EU international community and to the negotiations for the 20-year Cotonou Agreement, March 21, 2009.
