= Stephen Miti =

Zambian Independent MP for Feira from 2016 to 2021

Member of the National Assembly for Feira
- In office August 2016 – August 2021
- Preceded by: Patrick Ngoma
- Succeeded by: Emmanuel Tembo

Personal details
- Born: 18 March 1973 (age 52); Zambia
- Political party: Independent
- Education: Advanced Certificate in Business Administration; Journalism; Project Planning; Public Relations; Social Work; Bachelor of Entrepreneurship; Diploma in Marketing
- Profession: Businessman · Politician

Stephen Miti (born 18 March 1973) is a Zambian businessman and independent politician who represented Feira constituency in the National Assembly of Zambia from 2016 to 2021.

== Early life and education ==
Miti holds multiple advanced certificates in business administration, journalism, project planning, public relations, and social work, and earned a Bachelor of Entrepreneurship as well as a Diploma in Marketing. Before entering politics, he worked in business.

== Parliamentary career ==
Miti stood as an independent candidate in Feira constituency at the 2016 general election and was elected. He held no party affiliation while in office and served as a backbench member.

While in Parliament, he served on several committees, including the Committee on Government Assurances from October 2016 to September 2017 and again from October 2017 to May 2021, as well as the Committee on Delegated Legislation starting in February 2018.
