= John Harrison Clark =

South African adventurer

Changa-Changa
- Chief of the Mashukulumbwe
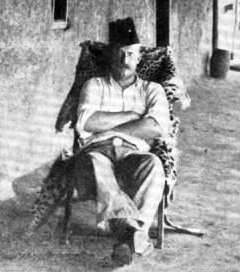
- Purported photo of John Harrison Clark in later life

King of the Senga
- Reign: 1890s–1902
- Predecessor: Monarchy established
- Successor: Monarchy abolished; annexed by British South Africa Company
- Born: John Harrison Clark; 10 May 1867; Port Elizabeth, South Africa
- Died: 9 December 1927 (aged 60); Broken Hill, Northern Rhodesia
- Spouses: Agnes Helen Cox; Juvi Mphuka
- Issue: John Harrison Burchmore Clark IV; Celine Geraldine Harrison Clark
- Father: John Harrison Clark II
- Mother: Elizabeth Challen Clark
- Military career
- Allegiance: Cape Colony
- Branch: Cape Mounted Riflemen
- Service years: 1880s

John Harrison Clark III or Changa-Changa (10 May 1867 – 9 December 1927) was an Anglo-South African explorer and adventurer who effectively ruled much of what is today southern Zambia from the early 1890s to 1902. He arrived alone from South Africa in about 1887, reputedly as an outlaw, and assembled and trained a private army of Senga natives that he used to drive off various bands of slave-raiders. He took control of a swathe of territory on the north bank of the Zambezi river, became known as Chief "Changa-Changa" and, through a series of treaties with local chiefs, gained mineral and labour concessions covering much of the region.

Starting in 1897, Clark attempted to secure protection for his holdings from the British South Africa Company. The Company took little notice of him. A local chief, Chintanda, complained to the Company in 1899 that Clark had secured his concessions while passing himself off as a Company official and had been collecting hut tax for at least two years under this pretence. The Company resolved to remove him from power, and did so in 1902. Clark then farmed for about two decades, with some success, and moved in the late 1910s to Broken Hill. There he became a prominent local figure, and a partner in the first licensed brewery in Northern Rhodesia. Remaining in Broken Hill for the rest of his life, he died there in 1927.

== Early life ==
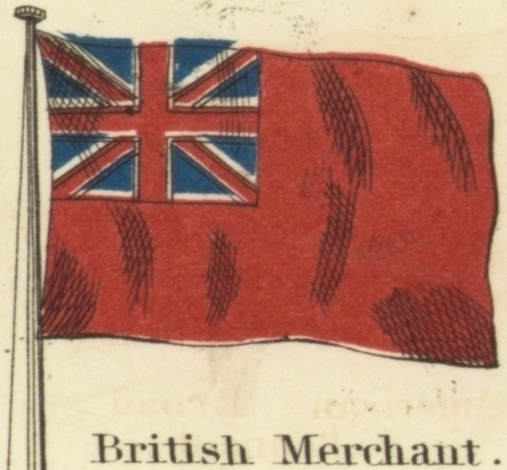
The Red Ensign, as flown by Harrison Clark over his house at Feira.

Not much is known about John Harrison Clark's early life. The son of a man "in the hardware business" (according to a military officer who knew him, Major G R Deare), named John Harrison Clark II and Elizabeth Challen Clark, he was born in Port Elizabeth, Cape Colony on 10 May 1867, and engaged for a time in the Cape Mounted Riflemen during the 1880s. A tall, physically strong man, he wore a large black moustache and was regarded as a fine shot and a capable hunter.

Harrison Clark left South Africa in 1887, but it is unclear why; according to a story that may be apocryphal, he fled the country as an outlaw soon after his revolver fired—by accident, so the story goes—and killed a man. Whatever the truth, he travelled to Mozambique, then a Portuguese territory, where he made his way upriver along the Zambezi until he reached Feira, a long-abandoned Portuguese settlement at the confluence of the Zambezi and Luangwa Rivers, in what is today southern Zambia. Feira was founded by missionaries from Portugal in about 1720, but by 1887 it was a ghost town. Its last inhabitants had fled amid a native rising about half a century before, and since then it had been deserted.

David Livingstone, who visited Feira in 1856, described it as utterly ruined at that time, but still conspicuous by the ramshackle monastery buildings on the site. When Clark arrived about three decades later, the Portuguese still maintained a boma (fort) called Zumbo on the opposite bank of the Luangwa, but the surrounding country was largely wild and out of the control of any government. Harrison Clark settled at Feira, initially alone. According to a letter he wrote in 1897, he flew the British Merchant Navy's Red Ensign flag over his house.

== Rise to power ==
Slave-raiding was rife along the Zambezi River, with gangs of Arab, Portuguese and mixed Chikunda-Portuguese ethnicity competing for the capture of local Baila and Batonga people for use as slaves. Clark, who became known to the locals as "Changa-Changa", raised and trained an "army" from among the Senga people, and issued these men a vague uniform. How he became a chief is equivocal—Deare asserted that Clark arrived in the territory "on the very day the chief died ... [and] was finally made chief of the tribe". According to a story told by an acquaintance, Harry Rangeley, and partly corroborated by Alexander Scott in the Central African Post in 1949, he became chief by virtue of winning a battle. Rangeley's version has him defeating a rival chief; Scott has Clark coming to the rescue of a Baila village under attack by Portuguese slavers, "liberat[ing] the slaves" and thereupon being proclaimed chief by the grateful villagers.

As chief, Clark secured his authority with his army of Senga warriors, defined and collected "taxes" and oversaw the activities of foreign traders in the area. Locals paid tribute in the form of cattle, and overseas merchants had to obtain a "trading licence" from Harrison Clark before they could operate in his territory. Where a trader was harvesting ivory to sell overseas, Clark levied every other tusk as an "export tax". As well as regulating local trade, Clark encouraged the people to make paths between their villages, and repeatedly defended them against the various slave-raiding gangs. As his Senga troops expanded, he conferred various grandiose titles on himself, including "King of the Senga" and "Chief of the Mashukulumbwe".

All of this caused considerable annoyance to the Portuguese at Zumbo, though the boma coexisted with Clark's settlement for the most part. The most prominent trans-river clash came when Clark demonstrated the strength of his army by overpowering the fort's garrison, pulling down the Portuguese flag and running up the Union Jack in its place. He then returned to Feira, leaving the British flag flying over Zumbo. His point made, he made no attempt to stop the Portuguese garrison from returning. The Portuguese arrested Clark at one point, according to one story, but released him after the native troopers refused to guard him, saying he was "too great a man to be arrested". A similar tale has Harrison Clark being captured in Mozambique and deported to Feira under guard by two Portuguese soldiers; these men found the journey so harrowing that Clark ended up escorting them back. According to one of Clark's indigenous followers, he once put an intruding Chikunda force to flight simply by bellowing at the enemy leader to "voetsek you bloody nigger".

Clark consolidated his chieftainship by marrying a daughter of Mpuka, the chief of the Chikunda people; According to Deare this was just one of "the usual assortment of wives". In 1895 he relocated north to the confluence of the Lukasashi and Lunsemfwa Rivers, where he established his own village. He named the settlement "Algoa" after the Portuguese name for Port Elizabeth, and lived in a small stone fort he built. Writing in 1954, the historian W V Brelsford described Clark's sphere of influence from Algoa as "the Luano Valley and the uplands as far westwards as the Kafue and southwards to Feira".

== Contact with the British South Africa Company ==
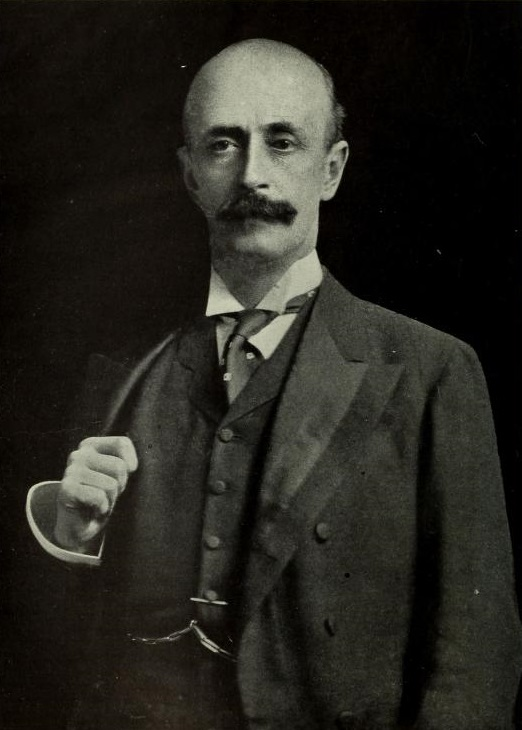
Earl Grey, the British South Africa Company administrator who Clark asked to honour his holdings in 1897.

The British South Africa Company (BSAC), established by Cecil Rhodes in 1889, was designed to occupy and develop the area immediately north of the Transvaal, with the ultimate goal of aiding Rhodes's dream of a Cape to Cairo railway through British territory. Having a firm hold over Matabeleland, Mashonaland and Barotseland by 1894, the company began officially calling its domain "Rhodesia" in 1895. The BSAC sought to further expand its influence north of the Zambezi, and to that end regularly sent expeditions into what was dubbed North-Eastern Rhodesia to negotiate concessions with local rulers and found settlements.

In 1896, Major Deare led one such expedition north from the main seat of Company administration, Fort Salisbury, to meet with the Ngoni chief Mpezeni, who ruled to the east of Harrison Clark. One day, to Deare's surprise, a small group of warriors approached his party from the west, carrying a letter. This message, written in English and signed "Changa-Changa, Chief of the Mashukulumbwe"—the name John Harrison Clark was given in the body of the letter—said that its author had heard of a white man being entertained recently by Mpezeni, and wished to provide the same hospitality at Algoa. "Really, wonders never cease!" Deare recalled. "I had heard of this man on the Zambezi and had known him well many years ago in the Cape Colony ... We had both lived in the same town for years. I learnt his story later." It is unclear whether Deare took up Clark's invitation to Algoa.

Harrison Clark subsequently sought protection from the British South Africa Company. He negotiated concessions with two neighbouring chiefs, Chintanda and Chapugira, each of whom signed over the mining and labour rights for his respective territory in return for a specified fee whenever Clark wished to use them. In August 1897, Clark wrote to the Company administrator in Salisbury, Earl Grey, requesting that the Company honour these holdings, enclosing copies of the concessions he had secured. Also providing a cursory description of gold mining prospects in the region, Clark criticised the actions of Lieutenant-Colonel Robert Warton, who was in the vicinity representing the North Charterland Exploration Company, a BSAC subsidiary. "Mashukulumbwe can be occupied without fighting," he wrote. "I am on friendly terms with all the natives, and, if necessary, can raise a force of three to seven thousand to operate on Mfisini [Mpezeni] or Mashukulumbwe. Colonel Warton's Administration of this country has been a mistake; the country is rich in alluvial and reef gold." The Company took little notice of Clark, but he continued in the same vein, acquiring similar concessions from the chiefs Chetentaunga, Luvimbie, Sinkermeronga and Mubruma over the following two years.

Clark wrote to the Company again on 12 April 1899, once more attaching copies of his concessions, with an offer to supply the BSAC settlements in Southern Rhodesia with contract labourers taken from among his neighbouring chiefs' populations. He said he had permission from all of the chiefs involved to do so. He requested as his fee £1 per man, and said that he had agreed a monthly wage of 10 shillings for each worker plus food, accommodation and fuel. Having split his concessions into two sections to draw labour from, Clark proposed to provide Salisbury with workers from his eastern concessions, and Bulawayo with those from the west. The chiefs had agreed to provide workers on contracts lasting six months, but Clark wrote that he could attempt to supply labour all year round if the Company wished.

== Decline and fall ==
On 14 April 1899, Chief Chintanda gave a BSAC commissioner at Mazoe, Southern Rhodesia a statement in which, among other things, he asserted that Clark had been claiming to be a Company official and had been collecting tariffs such as hut tax under that pretence for at least two years. Clark's labour and mining concessions, Chintanda said, had been agreed under the impression that he represented the BSAC. Chintanda furthermore claimed that Clark was a prolific womaniser who had once raped a pregnant woman. "Whenever Clark sees a girl he fancies he takes her as his mistress for a few days, and when tired of her sends her home," Chintanda said. "The fathers and husbands of these girls are constantly complaining to me about Clark's actions, but I can do nothing as Clark is a white man, and professed to be representing the government." The chief asked the company to send a genuine representative.

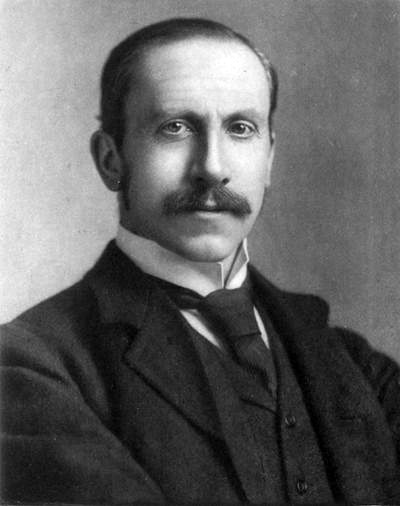
Alfred Milner, the British High Commissioner for Southern Africa

Chintanda's affidavit caused the BSAC to become concerned about Clark's continued authority in North-Eastern Rhodesia and to begin investigating him more thoroughly. The situation was complicated when, after a month's perusal, the company's lawyers resolved that the courts in Salisbury and Bulawayo held no jurisdiction outside Southern Rhodesia and therefore could not hear any case brought against Clark. On 4 July 1899, Arthur Lawley, the company's administrator in Matabeleland, wrote to Cape Town to report the situation to the resident High Commissioner for Southern Africa, Alfred Milner. Lawley briefly summarised the charges against Clark and requested permission to hold a court north of the Zambezi under the supervision of one of three chiefs friendly to the company. Milner replied on 17 August that he could not legally sanction this, and that Lawley should pursue the matter further only when authority extended over Clark's area.

On 24 August 1899, Sub-Inspector A M Harte-Barry of the British South Africa Police interviewed Chief Mubruma, who corroborated much of what Chintanda had said regarding Clark's claims to represent the company. Mubruma said that Clark had visited the previous week and had told him to have his men ready for work south of the river within a month. When told that Clark had no connection with the BSAC, Mubruma said that he would not give Clark the workers, but would readily take part in the kind of scheme he had suggested if the Company wished. He made no comment relevant to Clark's alleged sexual misconduct.

The BSAC established two forts to the north-west of Algoa in 1900, then a boma at Feira in 1902, bringing Mashukulumbwe under Company control. Harrison Clark said that his concessions gave him authority over the area and demanded that the Company pay him for them. The BSAC said Clark's documents were illegal and refused to deal with him. It offered him compensation, the form of which differs by source; Brelsford and a man who knew Clark personally during the 1920s, Colonel N O Earl Spurr, say that he was given farms as compensation, while a 1920s business acquaintance, A M Bentley, writes that the Company promised grants of land and the right to reserve some mining claims. Clark reluctantly accepted the compensation when he realised that to challenge the BSAC he would have to travel a great distance, possibly to England, and invest heavily in a court case he would probably lose.

== Later life and death ==
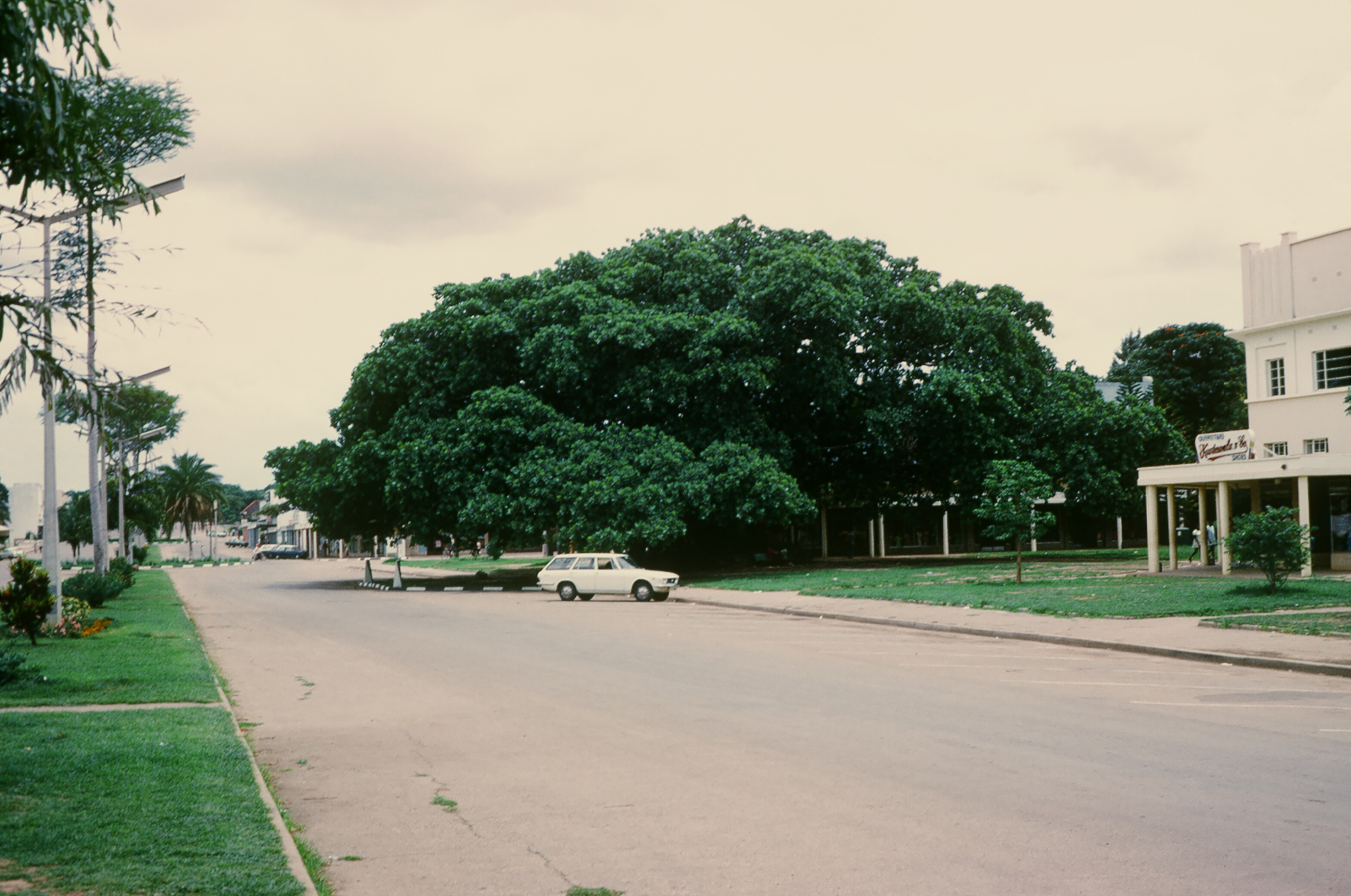
"The Big Tree" in the centre of Broken Hill, the town where Clark lived in later life (1974 photograph)

Clark became a successful farmer, experimenting with the growing of rubber, cotton and other plants previously absent from the area. His cotton plantation developed promisingly for a few years, but he abandoned it after heavy rain destroyed an entire crop around 1909. He remained on the farm until the late 1910s, when he either gave or sold it to Catholic missionaries, and moved to Broken Hill, one of the largest settlements in what had become Northern Rhodesia in 1911. Here he lived for the rest of his life. Retaining "Changa-Changa" as a nickname, he helped to develop various businesses and events, acted as a partner in the first licensed brewery in Northern Rhodesia (alongside Lester Blake-Jolly), and became "one of the pillars of society in the Broken Hill of those days", according to Spurr. He owned one of the first automobiles in Northern Rhodesia—a dark green Ford Model T.

According to Brelsford, the elderly Harrison Clark remained highly respected among the indigenous people and was sometimes called upon to settle disputes. His last job was personnel manager at a local mine. He dedicated his final years to the writing of a book about his life, the manuscript for which was lost when his house burned down. Clark alleged that the BSAC orchestrated the fire to stop him from publishing unflattering information about the early days of Company rule. He died from heart disease in Broken Hill on 9 December 1927, aged about 67, and was buried in the Protestant section of the town cemetery, plot 172. The modest savings he possessed at the time of his death were left to his sister in Port Elizabeth.

According to M D D Newitt, Clark embodied much of the pioneering spirit of the time and was "an object of legend" to his fellow frontiersmen. "He had led a wild, tough life but it had not turned him either into a rascal or into an uncouth bush dweller," Brelsford writes. "Changa-Changa" endured in the local vernacular as a word roughly meaning "boss", and was still in use in Zambia in the 1970s. Summarising Clark's life, Peter Duignan and Lewis Gann conclude that he "experienced in his own person the transition from bush feudalism to capitalism."
