= Zumbo =

- Location within Mozambique
- Coordinates: 15°37′S 30°27′E
- Country: Mozambique
- Provinces: Tete Province
- District: Zumbo District

Population (2005)
  - Total: 33,000
- Time zone: UTC+2 (CAT)
- Climate: BSh

Zumbo is the westernmost town in Mozambique, on the Zambezi River. Lying on the north-east bank of the Zambezi-Luangwa River confluence, it is a border town, with Zambia (and the town of Luangwa, previously called Feira) across the Luangwa River and Zimbabwe (with its border post at Kanyemba) diagonally across the Zambezi and 2 km upstream. In 2005, Zumbo had a population of 33,000, and it lies in the Zumbo District of Tete Province.

Zumbo was established as a trading post in the early 18th century by the Portuguese. It became prosperous as it traded along the middle Zambezi and into Zimbabwe, and up the lower Luangwa, trading for ivory as far away as Lake Bangweulu. It dominated the area, and traders from Zumbo settled in Feira. Zumbo declined after Northern and Southern Rhodesia (later Zambia and Zimbabwe) became part of the British Empire, cutting off its trade with those territories.

In the 1970s the Cahora Bassa Dam and lake were created downstream. Zumbo is at the farthest upstream extent of the lake.

The town's strategic location meant that in the Mozambican War of Independence and Mozambican Civil War, guerrilla warfare was active in and around the town and many landmines were laid. Zumbo was abandoned for a time in the civil war and partially destroyed, and reconstruction is still continuing.

As well as fishing in the river and lake, economic activity relies on trade with the neighbouring countries, inevitably involving smuggling as well. There are small coal mines near the town, and the main crops grown on the fertile banks and floodplain of the rivers are rice, cassava, and beans.

Road connections with the rest of Mozambique are in very poor condition, and the main means of travel and supply is by boat from Songo at the Cahora Bassa Dam.
