= Gwembe =

- Town
- Location in Zambia
- Country: Zambia
- Province: Southern Province
- District: Gwembe District

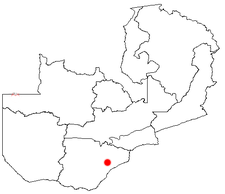
Location of Gwembe in Zambia

Gwembe is a small town in Southern Province of Zambia with a population of about 2000 people. It is part of Gwembe District which is by the Lake Kariba shoreline. It used to be the district headquarters until it moved to Munyumbwe some 30 km south-east of the town.

One of the main agricultural activities in this district is cotton growing which was influenced by the presence of a cotton ginnery plant, which provided a lot of employment to the residents. As of 2017, the local people have also focused on growing maize as a source of food and income. Most of the residents are subsistence farmers.
