= 2022 Zambian census =

2022 Census of Zambia
← 2010	August 18, 2022 - September 14, 2022	2032 →

General information
- Country: Zambia
- Topics: Census topics: People and population; Families and living arrangements; Nationality; Education; Economic Characteristics; Religion
- Authority: Zambia Statistics Agency (ZamStats)
- Website: www.zamstats.gov.zm

Results
- Total population: 19,610,769 (33.3%▲)
- Most populous province: Lusaka (3,093,617)
- Least populous province: Muchinga (922,213)

The 2022 census of Zambia was a detailed enumeration of the Zambian population that became the sixth national census in the country since independence. It began on August 18, 2022, and concluded by September 14, 2022. It became Zambia's first-ever digitally conducted population census.

== Background ==
The Zambia Statistics Agency is mandated to conduct the Census of Population and Housing (CPH) every 10 years as per Statistics Act No. 13 of 2018. The Census was supposed to be conducted in 2020 but was postponed to November 2021 due to funding challenges. In November 2021, the census failed to take place due to delays in procurement of materials needed for the census. The 2022 census became the sixth conducted in independent Zambia; the first was conducted in 1969 and thereafter, 1980, 1990, 2000 and 2010.

== Administration ==
Zambia Statistics Agency conducted the sixth census of population and Housing. The enumeration and data collecting exercise was carried out from 18 August to 14 September 2022 by 45,000 Enumerators and Supervisors.

== Reports ==
Zambia's population by 2022 had increased to a total of 19,610,769; where the female population was 10,007,713 and the male population was 9,603,056.
