= University Teaching Hospital =

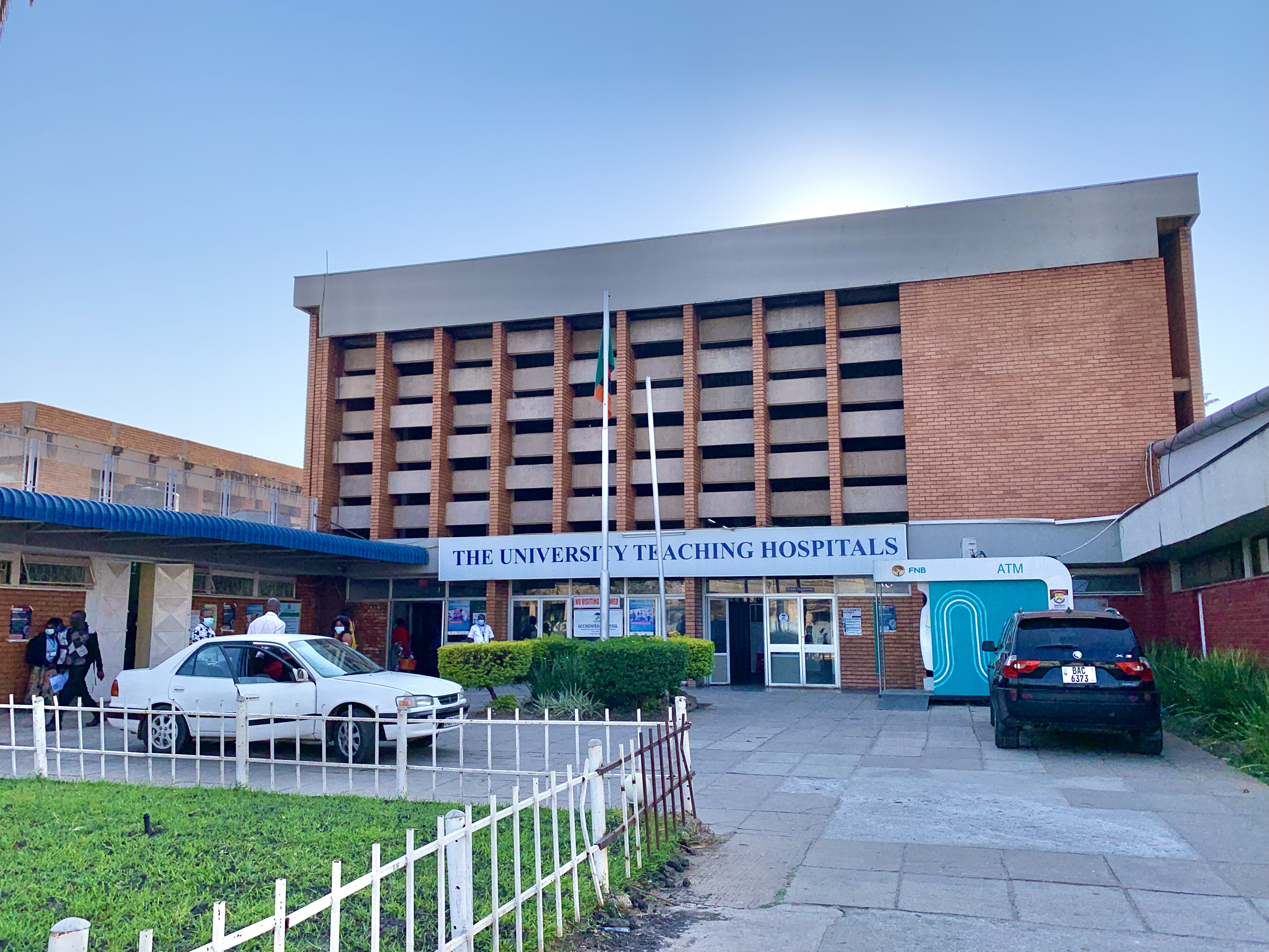

Geography
- Location: Nationalist Road, Ridgeway, Lusaka, Lusaka Province, Zambia
- Coordinates: 15.432071°S 28.313674°E

Organisation
- Type: Teaching & Referral

Services
- Beds: 1,655

History
- Opened: 1934

Links
- Website: www.uth.gov.zm
- Lists: Hospitals in Zambia

The University Teaching Hospital (UTH), formerly Lusaka Hospital, is the biggest public tertiary hospital in Lusaka, Zambia. It is the largest hospital with 1,655 beds. It is a teaching hospital and, as such, is used to train local medical students, nurses and other health professionals. UTH is the main medical training institution in Zambia for doctors, nurses, clinical officers and other health professionals. It provides primary, secondary and tertiary care.

== History ==
It was built in 1910 with 15 bed capacity and was meant for sick Africans who were only cared for by male orderlies as the hospital had no doctors and nurses. With the decision to move the capital city from Livingstone to a much more central Lusaka, plans for a bigger hospital to cater for the increasing number of patients were prepared. Therefore, a new hospital was started at present day UTH site in 1934 and became a training hospital in the same year. UTH offers both inpatient and outpatient care and is a center for specialist referrals from across the country.

== Location ==
UTH is located in Ridgeway in the capital city of Lusaka, approximately 4 km east of the city centre.

== Notable physicians and faculty ==
- Christine Kaseba, a surgeon specializing in obstetrics and gynecology, former First Lady of Zambia (2011–2014)
- John S. Kachimba, a medical superintendent and consultant urologist who is the editor-in-chief of the Medical Journal of Zambia.
- Aaron Mujajati, a physician specializing in internal medicine.
