= Chilanga (Lusaka), Zambia =

Township in Zambia

Chilanga
- Township

- Location within Zambia
- Coordinates: 15.5681°S 28.2700°E
- Country: Zambia

Chilanga is a township located 20 km south of Zambia's capital city, Lusaka. It is situated midway between Lusaka and Kafue on the T2 road.

== Notable features ==
Chilanga is home to a major Lafarge cement plant, known as Chilanga Cement, which dominates the skyline of the area. Chilanga is also home to Baobab College, Mount Makulu Research Station, the headquarters of the Zambia Agricultural Research Institute, Eureka Camping Park, Munda Wanga Environmental Park and Sandy's Creations Garden Centre.

== History and geography ==
Like most Zambian towns, Chilanga was historically a colonial settlement and the home of European expatriates. After Zambia gained independence from the United Kingdom in 1964, most white settlers left, and local residents took over the land. By the beginning of the 1980s, almost all of Chilanga was resettled by African Zambians. Before 2011, Chilanga was a part of Kafue District (although it was widely known as being part of Lusaka). In 2011, the president of Zambia, Michael Sata, made Chilanga its own town and district. Chilanga District covers the area separating Lusaka from Shibuyunji District as well as the area in between Lusaka and Kafue along the Great North Road, where the town centre is located.

== Climate ==
Chilanga features a humid subtropical climate (Köppen: Cwa), with distinct wet and dry seasons. October and November are the hottest months. Winters are milder, with July being the coolest month. The wet season, from November to March, experiences significant rainfall. The dry season, from May to October, is marked by minimal precipitation.

Climate data for Chilanga (Mount Makulu Research Station) (1991–2020)
Month	Jan	Feb	Mar	Apr	May	Jun	Jul	Aug	Sep	Oct	Nov	Dec	Year
Record high °C (°F)	34.8 (94.6)	35.7 (96.3)	36.2 (97.2)	35.5 (95.9)	32.9 (91.2)	31.4 (88.5)	33.8 (92.8)	34.6 (94.3)	39.0 (102.2)	40.2 (104.4)	39.5 (103.1)	37.0 (98.6)	35.9 (96.6)
Mean daily maximum °C (°F)	28.0 (82.4)	28.2 (82.8)	28.4 (83.1)	27.7 (81.9)	26.6 (79.9)	24.8 (76.6)	24.6 (76.3)	27.5 (81.5)	31.1 (88.0)	32.7 (90.9)	31.5 (88.7)	28.5 (83.3)	28.3 (82.9)
Daily mean °C (°F)	22.9 (73.2)	22.9 (73.2)	22.6 (72.7)	21.4 (70.5)	19.1 (66.4)	17.0 (62.6)	17.0 (62.6)	19.9 (67.8)	23.2 (73.8)	25.6 (78.1)	25.2 (77.4)	23.3 (73.9)	21.6 (70.9)
Mean daily minimum °C (°F)	17.7 (63.9)	17.6 (63.7)	16.8 (62.2)	15.0 (59.0)	11.6 (52.9)	9.2 (48.6)	9.4 (48.9)	12.2 (54.0)	15.2 (59.4)	18.4 (65.1)	18.8 (65.8)	18.0 (64.4)	15.0 (59.0)
Record low °C (°F)	10.8 (51.4)	12.4 (54.3)	10.0 (50.0)	7.8 (46.0)	0.6 (33.1)	−0.1 (31.8)	−0.8 (30.6)	0.5 (32.9)	4.5 (40.1)	9.9 (49.8)	11.5 (52.7)	12.0 (53.6)	6.6 (43.9)
Average precipitation mm (inches)	207.7 (8.18)	160.3 (6.31)	88.8 (3.50)	29.3 (1.15)	3.3 (0.13)	0.0 (0.0)	0.0 (0.0)	0.0 (0.0)	0.2 (0.01)	16.0 (0.63)	95.9 (3.78)	171.1 (6.74)	772.6 (30.42)
Source: NOAA

== Development ==
Since colonial times, Chilanga has grown in size and population due to new businesses, commercial farming, small farm holding settlements, and housing plots. Water supply is still a challenge for most settlers as the land is hilly and rocky and there is not a large enough municipal supply system to cater for the increased demand. Boreholes are common. Formerly government-owned houses are now privately owned as they and other government buildings around Zambia were sold in the mid 1990s. Since then, much construction has taken place.

== Kafue Road ==
Kafue Road (T2) runs through the center of Chilanga. Once a quiet and rarely used two-lane road, it has now become a busy four-lane thoroughfare. A large volume of truck traffic moves through the town on a daily basis, including very large shipments travelling to the mines in Copperbelt Province in the north. It is the main trunk road connecting Zambia with Zimbabwe through either Chirundu or Victoria Falls via the T1 through Livingstone. North of Lusaka, the T2 becomes the Great North Road, connecting southern Africa to central and eastern Africa.

== Zambian railways ==
Zambian Railways operates a railroad yard within Chilanga, which serves as a transportation hub for the Lafarge cement plant. Zambian Railways operates both passenger trains and cargo trains.

== Languages ==
Traditionally, Chilanga is administered by one chiefdom. It is the home of the Soli people under chieftains Nkomesha Mukamambo II, it is for this reason that Soli is remains the indigenous tribe of the district. However, because Chilanga is a transitional area between Lusaka Province and Southern Province, both Tonga and Nyanja Bantu languages are spoken and understood, although, as with most of Zambia, many other tribal languages are also used. English is the official language of Zambia, and most people in Chilanga can communicate in English.

== Agriculture ==
Travelling away from the centre of town, most of the land in Chilanga is used for sustenance agriculture. The areas away from the Great North Road are similar to most Zambian villages, with basic shelter for homes, and large maize fields surrounding them.
