= Ndola Teaching Hospital =

Zambian public referral hospital

Ndola Central Hospital
- Location of Ndola

Geography
- Location: Ndola, Copperbelt Province, Zambia
- Coordinates: 12°58′12″S 28°38′2″E

Organisation
- Affiliated university: University of North Carolina; University of Zambia

Services
- Emergency department: Yes
- Beds: 800

Helipads
- Helipad: No

History
- Founded: 1997; 29 years ago

Links
- Other links: List of hospitals in Zambia

Ndola Central Hospital, also known as Ndola Teaching Hospital, is a third level public tertiary referral hospital in Ndola, Zambia. The hospital has over 800 beds and was named after the district in which it is located. The Hospital is operated and managed by the Ministry of Health of Zambia, with funding from the Government of the Republic of Zambia.

== Location ==
The hospital is located at the north-western corner of the city centre of Ndola in Copperbelt Province, at the corner of Nkana Road (T3) and Broadway. The facility has nearly 706 medical and trained administrative personnel, with more than 200 nurses. The hospital serves as a Provincial hospital with 3rd level services in Copperbelt Province .

== Overview ==
As a public hospital, it serves as the main referral hospital for Ndola District and provides health services to the local community. It has several ranges of health care services including inpatient and outpatient, as well as emergency care.

== See also ==
- List of hospitals in Zambia
