= Macha, Zambia =

Coordinates: 16°24′S 26°47′E

Macha is located in the Southern Province of Zambia, 70 km from the nearest town of Choma and 350 km by road from the capital city of Lusaka. The topography of the area is somewhat undulating, primarily open savannah woodland averaging 1,100 meters above sea level. The climate is tropical. The Macha area is populated by traditional villagers, living in small scattered homesteads which usually consist of one extended family. There are no commercial farmers or industries in the area. The primary livelihood is subsistence farming with maize being the main crop.

There is an estimated population of 135,000 within an approximate 35 km radius around Macha. Overall population density in this area is 25 per square kilometer and 50% of the population is under 12 years old. The average income for a person in the village in the areas surrounding Macha is US$1 per day. A bus trip to the nearest town of Choma costs approximately US$5.

== Institutes ==
At Macha, the following institutes operate:

- Macha Mission Hospital
- Macha Works
- Macha Research Trust
- Macha Push The Rock [7]

== Facilities ==
Macha boasts unique internet connectivity through rural ISP Macha Works/LinkNet. Also there is a gravel airfield, ABFA (All Blessings From Above). Vision Community Radio Macha broadcasts at 92.9 MHz
