= Gwembe District =

Coordinates: 16°30′S 28°00′E

- District
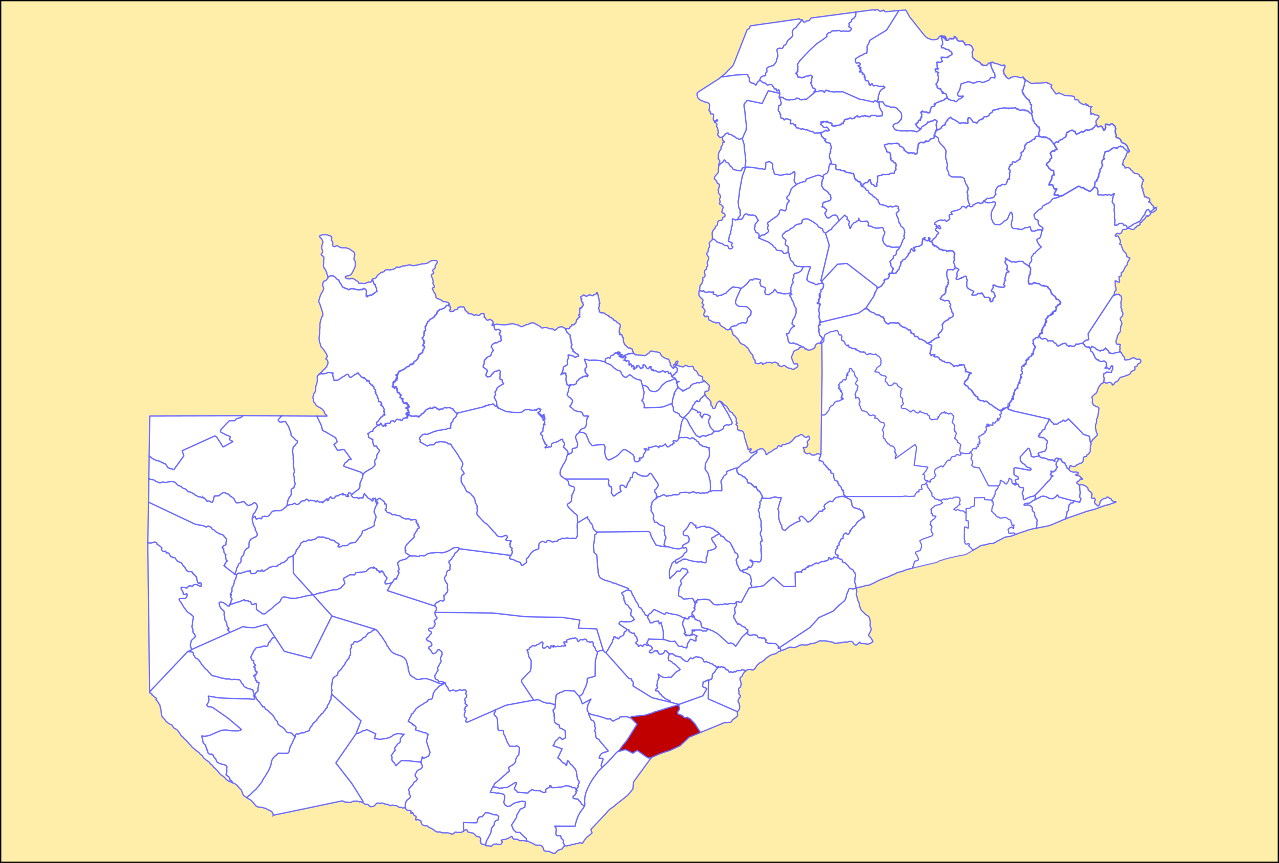
- District location in Zambia
- Country: Zambia
- Province: Southern Province
- Capital: Gwembe

Area
  - Total: 3,981.6 km^{2} (1,537.3 sq mi)

Population (2022)
  - Total: 79,273
  - Density: 19.910/km^{2} (51.566/sq mi)
- Time zone: UTC+2 (CAT)

Gwembe District is a district of Zambia, located in Southern Province. The capital now lies at Munyumbwe (the capital was formerly Gwembe Town). As of the 2022 Zambian Census, the district had a population of 79,273 people.
