= Rufunsa District =

Coordinates: 15°04′S 29°40′E

- District
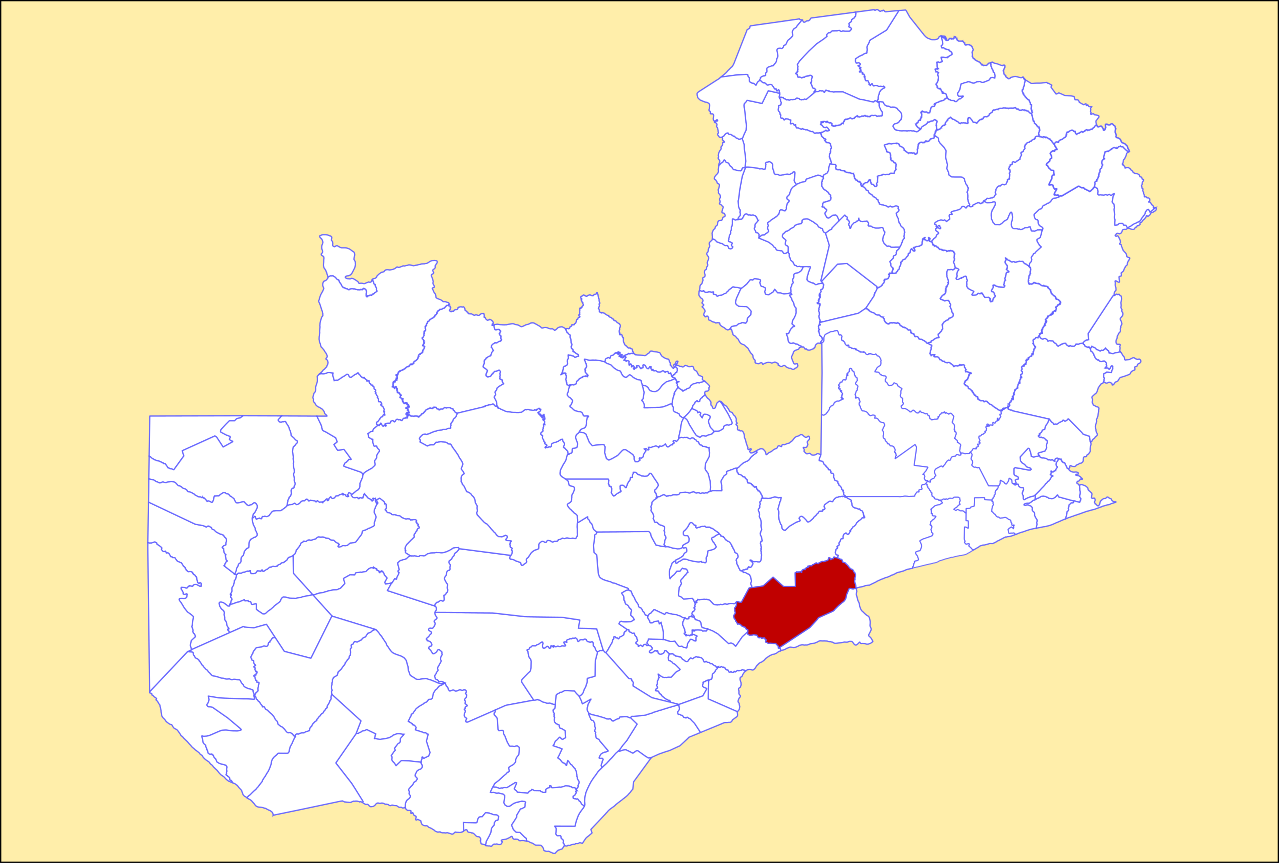
- District location in Zambia
- Country: Zambia
- Province: Lusaka Province
- Capital: Rufunsa

Population (2022)
  - Total: 81,733
- Time zone: UTC+2 (CAT)

Rufunsa District is a district in Zambia, located in Lusaka Province. The district capital is Rufunsa. The district was established by President Michael Sata in 2012 by splitting Chongwe District. As of the 2022 Zambian census, it has a population of 81,733.

== Economy ==
The main economic activity of the local people is subsistence farming. Rufunsa holds gold, copper, and other minerals, although mining is not well-developed.

== Education ==
Five decades after Zambia's independence, Rufunsa district now has twelve public secondary schools and three private secondary school s. However the Literacy levels are still low. The Catholic Church has given hope by building a nursing school.

== Geography ==
Rufunsa is on the Great East Road, approximately 150 km east of the capital, Lusaka.

== Demographics ==
The indigenous people there are the remnants of the Soli people. They had to relinquish much of Lusaka land to the central government.

== Governance ==
Three chiefs live in this district; Chief Bunda Bunda, Chieftainess Mpanshya, and Chieftainess Shikabeta.

Before 1997, Rufunsa District along with Chongwe District and Kafue District, were known as "Lusaka Rural".
