= Lower Zambezi National Park =

National park in Zambia

- IUCN category II (national park)
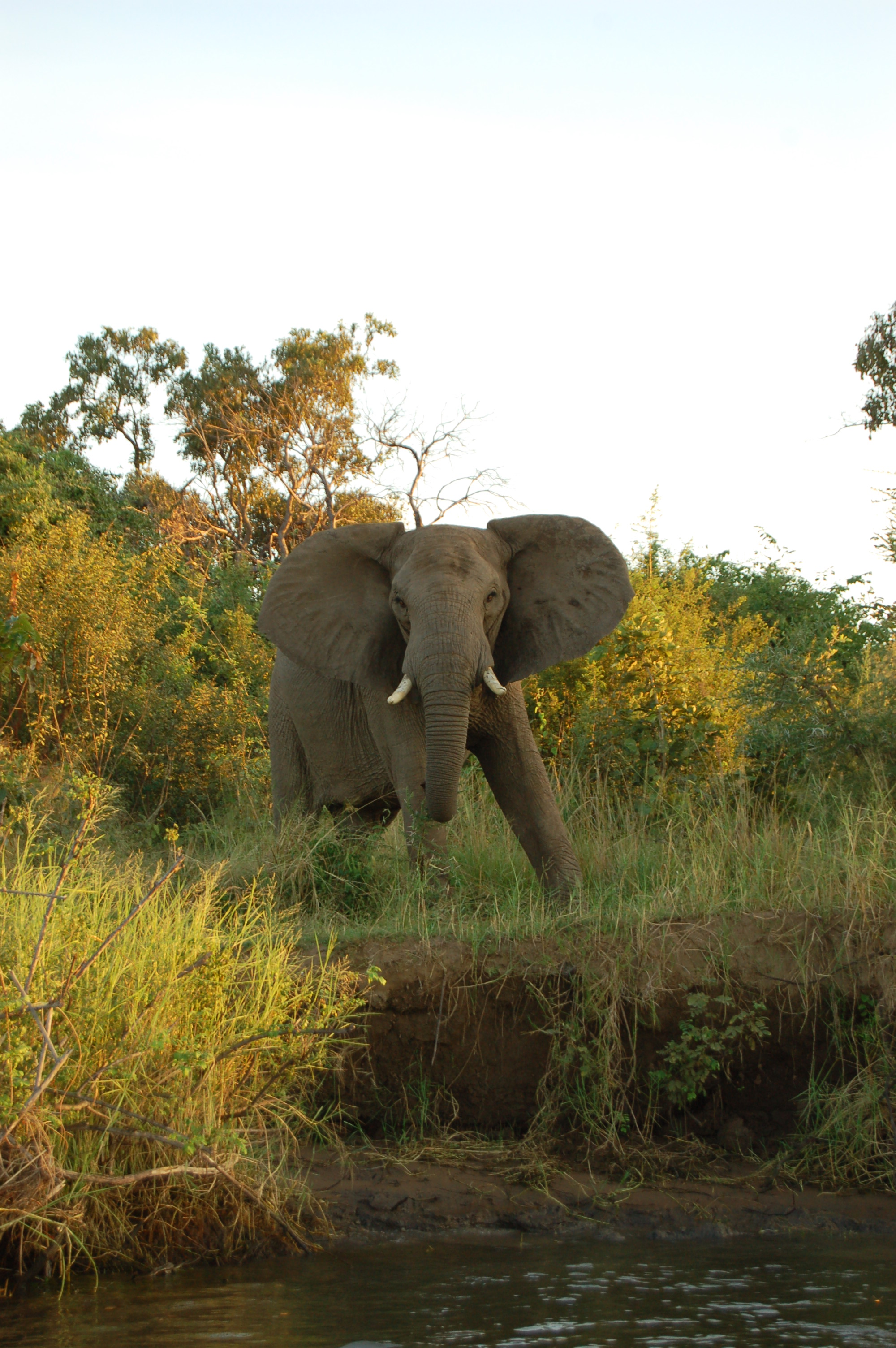

- Location within Zambia
- Location: Lusaka Province, Zambia
- Nearest city: Lusaka, Zambia
- Coordinates: 15°36′S 29°34′E
- Area: 4,092 km^{2} (1,580 sq mi)
- Established: 1983
- Governing body: Zambia Wildlife Authority

The Lower Zambezi National Park lies on the north bank of the Zambezi River in southeastern Zambia. Until 1983 when the area was declared a national park, the area was the private game reserve of Zambia's president. This meant that the park was protected from mass tourism and now remains one of the few untouched wilderness areas left in Africa. On the opposite bank is Zimbabwe's Mana Pools National Park. The two parks sit on the Zambezi floodplain ringed by mountains.

The park gently slopes from the Zambezi Escarpment down to the river, straddling two main woodland savannah ecoregions distinguished by the dominant types of tree, Miombo and Mopane: Southern Miombo woodlands on higher ground in the north, and Zambezian and Mopane woodlands on lower slopes in the south. At the edge of the river is a floodplain habitat.

The park itself is ringed by a much larger game management area (commonly referred to as GMA); there are no fences between the park and the GMA and both animals and people are free to roam across the whole area. An attraction of the Lower Zambezi Park and its surrounding GMA is its remote location. There are no paved roads and tourists are unlikely to encounter other tourists. There is an airport within the park named Jeki Airstrip with service on Proflight Zambia.

Most large mammals in the national park congregate on the floodplain, including the Cape buffalo, a large elephant population, lion, leopard, many antelope species, crocodile, and hippopotamus. There are occasional sightings of the Cape wild dog. There are also a large number of species of birds.

In 2011, a proposal was made for copper mining to take place within the Lower Zambezi National Park by Mwembeshi Resources Limited and the new mine was named the Kangaluwi Mine, with their application being approved in 2014 and mining set to commence in 2023. In May 2023, Mwembeshi Resources were ordered to pause mining at the site by the Zambia Environmental Management Agency and the Ministry of Green Economy and Environment due to their breaching conditions. Conservationists stated that it would negatively affect the tourism industry of the nation as well as the various animal species and the Zambezi River if the mining was to go ahead.

== See also ==
- Wildlife of Zambia
