= Chongwe District =

Coordinates: 15°21′S 28°38′E

- District
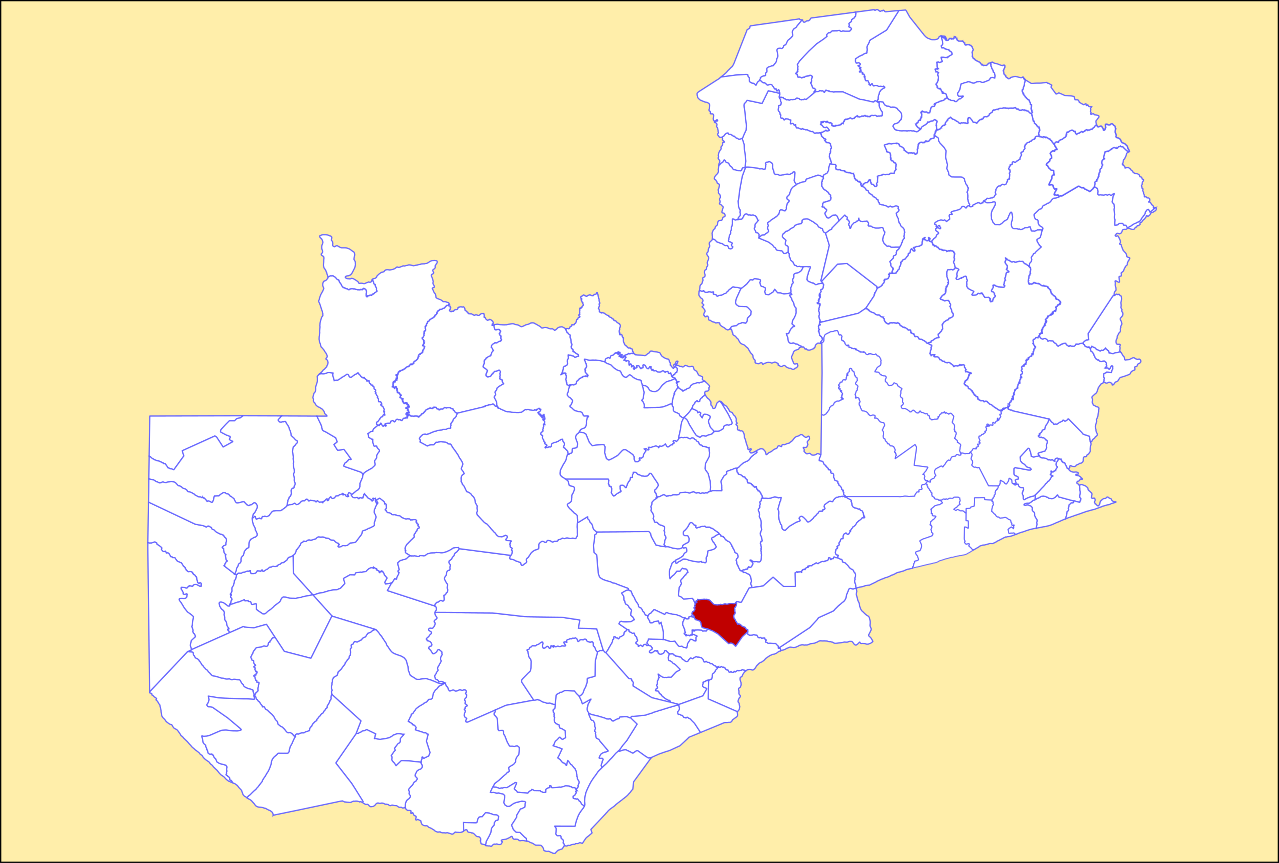
- District location in Zambia
- Country: Zambia
- Province: Lusaka Province
- Capital: Chongwe

Population (2022)
  - Total: 313,389
- Time zone: UTC+2 (CAT)

Chongwe District is a district of Zambia, located in Lusaka Province. The capital lies at Chongwe. As of the 2022 Zambian Census, the district had a population of 313,389 people.

Before 1997, Chongwe District, together with Kafue District, Chilanga District and Rufunsa District, was known as "Lusaka Rural".

Chongwe is home to Chalimbana University (formerly National In-service Teachers College - NISTCOL) and Palabana University (formerly Palabana College).
