= Luangwa District =

Coordinates: 15°25′S 30°05′E

- District
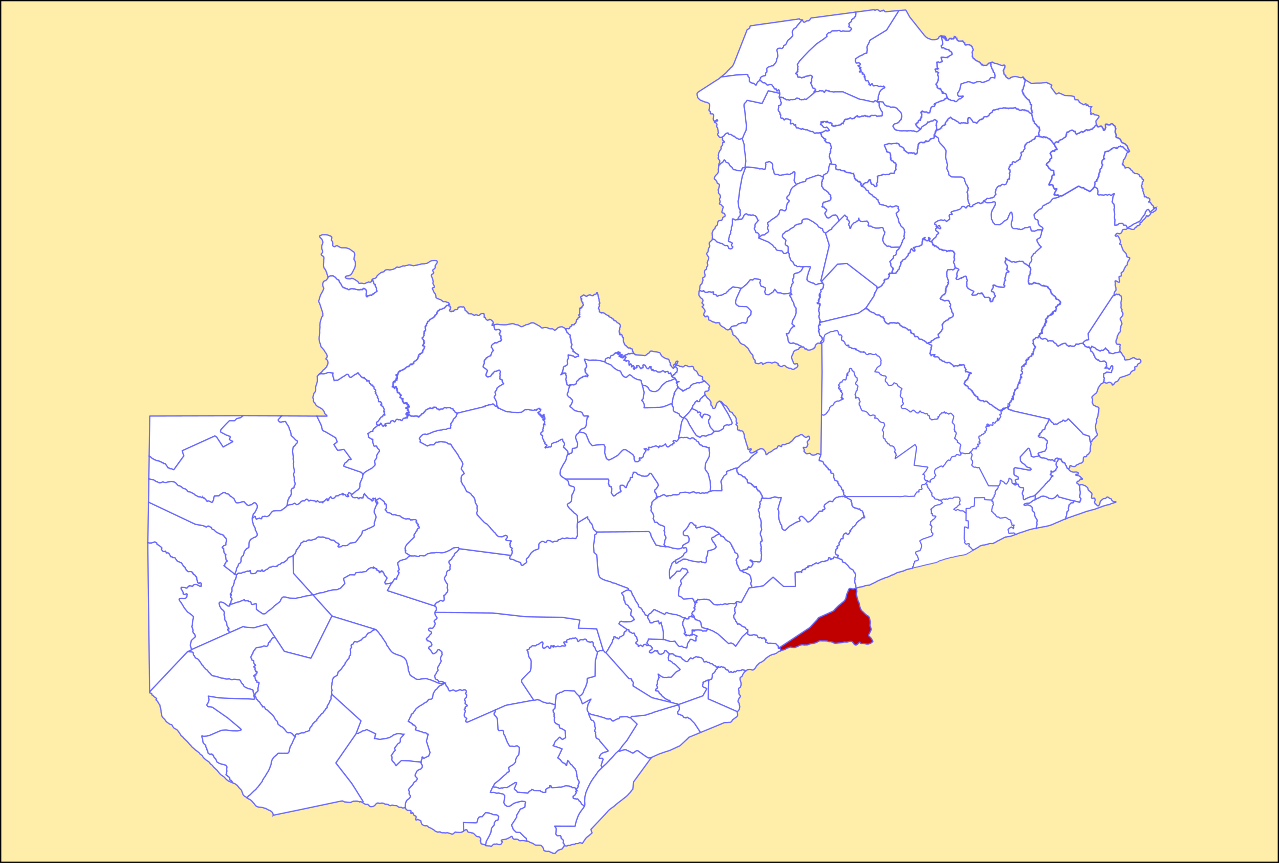
- District location in Zambia
- Country: Zambia
- Province: Lusaka Province
- Capital: Luangwa

Population (2022)
  - Total: 35,933
- Time zone: UTC+2 (CAT)

Luangwa District is a district of Zambia, located in Lusaka Province. As of the 2022 Zambian Census, the district had a population of 35,933 people.

Luangwa District is bordered by two Rivers, namely the Luangwa River to the east and the Zambezi River to the south. The Luangwa River separates it from Mozambique and the Zambezi separates it from Zimbabwe. The two rivers have a confluence adjacent to Luangwa, the seat of the district.

This mostly forested district includes multiple hills. Luangwa District is home to Zambezi escarpment, which stretches through the Lower Zambezi National Park. The district is thought to have been the earliest settlement of Europeans in the country, known then as Feira, before 1964. It has rich history and is home to two liberation sites - in Kavalamanja and Kakaro villages of the district. Besides that, the crossing of the Ngoni people fleeing from Shaka of the Zulu, was done at the confluence in the district as it was epically met with the eclipse at the time of crossing. The district has a number of national monuments.
