= Kafue District =

Coordinates: 15°41′S 28°34′E

- District
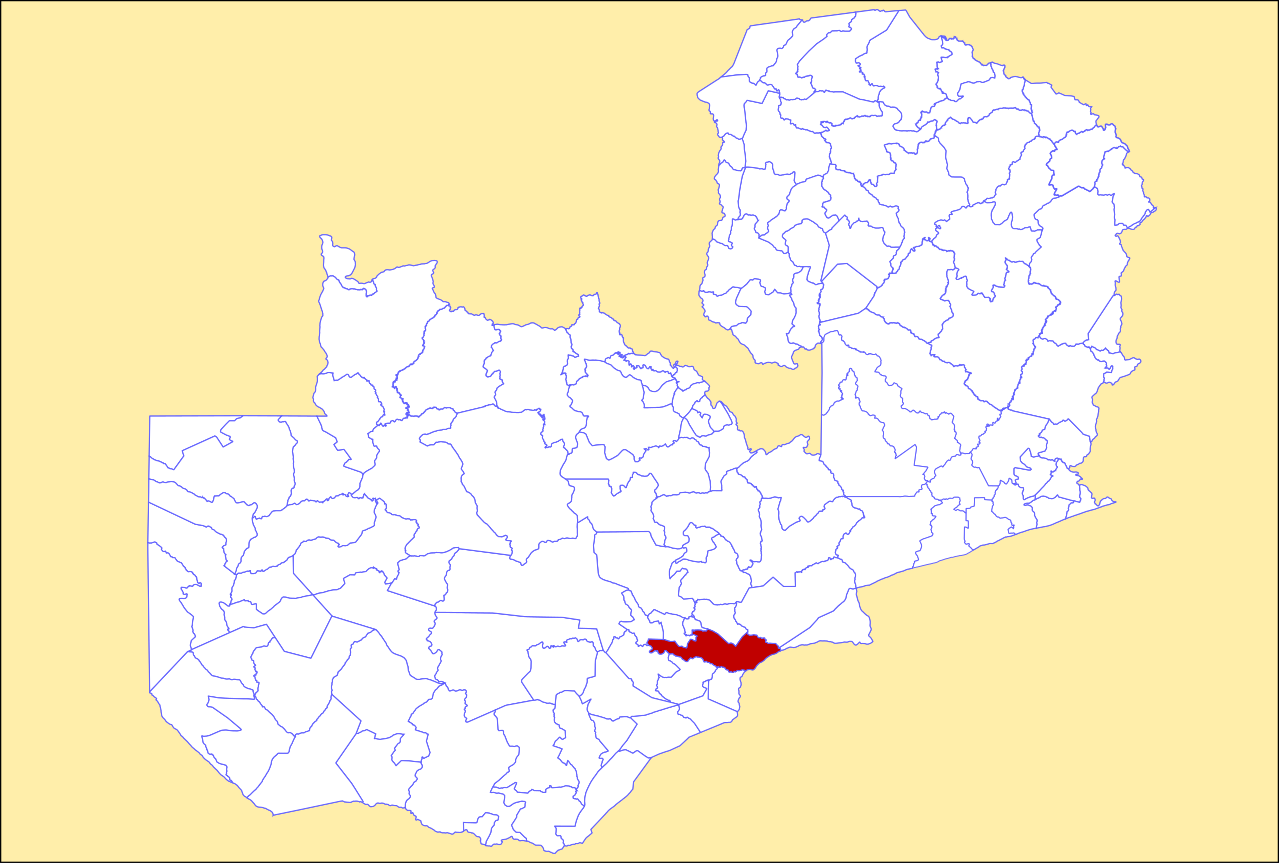
- District location in Zambia
- Country: Zambia
- Province: Lusaka Province
- Capital: Kafue

Area
  - Total: 4,471 km^{2} (1,726 sq mi)

Population (2022)
  - Total: 219,574
  - Density: 49.11/km^{2} (127.2/sq mi)
- Time zone: UTC+2 (CAT)

Kafue District is a district of Zambia, located in Lusaka Province. The capital lies at Kafue. As of the 2022 Zambian Census, the district had a population of 219,574 people.

Before 1997, Kafue District, together with Chongwe District and Rufunsa District, was known as "Lusaka Rural".
