= Chilanga District =

Coordinates: 15°27′S 28°05′E

- District
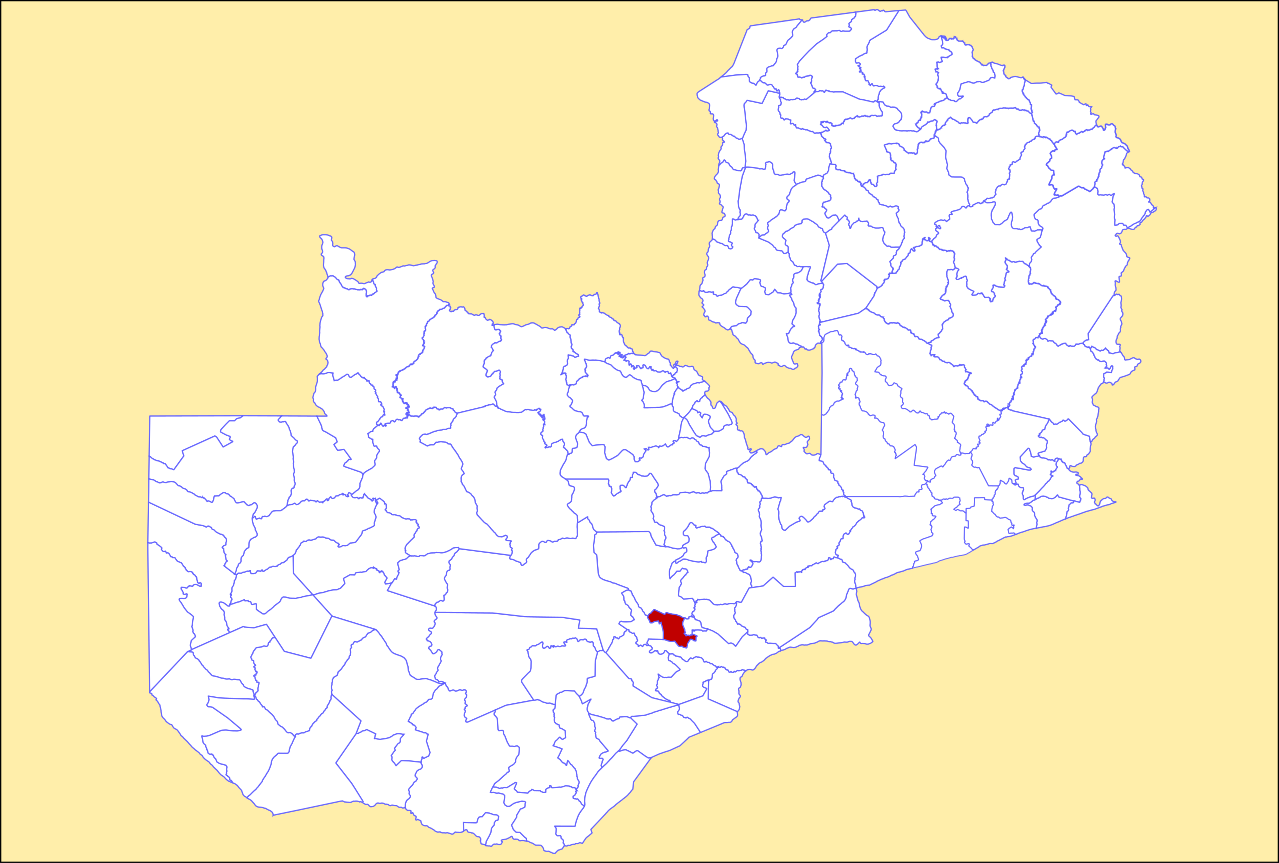
- District location in Zambia
- Country: Zambia
- Province: Lusaka Province

Area
  - Total: 1,354 km^{2} (523 sq mi)

Population (2022)
  - Total: 225,276
  - Density: 166.4/km^{2} (430.9/sq mi)
- Time zone: UTC+2 (CAT)

Chilanga District is a district of Lusaka Province, Zambia. The capital of the district is Chilanga. It was separated from Kafue District in 2012. As of the 2022 Zambian Census, the district had a population of 225,276 people.
