= Lusaka Province =

Province of Zambia

Coordinates: 15°25′S 29°00′E

Lusaka
- Province
- Nickname: LSK
- Map of Lusaka Province

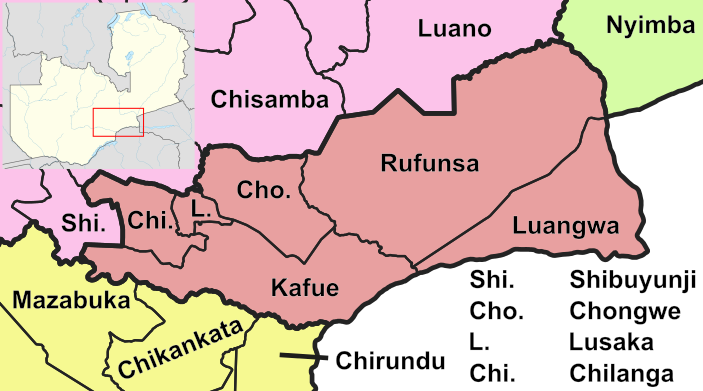
- Map of Lusaka Province showing its districts (in brick red)
- Country: Zambia
- Capital: Lusaka

Government
  - Type: Provincial Administration
  - Provincial Minister: Sheal Mulyata

Area
  - Province: 21,896 km^{2} (8,454 sq mi)

Population (2022)
  - Province: 3,079,964
  - Density: 140.66/km^{2} (364.32/sq mi)
  - Urban: 2,204,059
- Time zone: UTC+2
- HDI (2018): 0.664 medium · 1st
- Website: www.lsk.gov.zm

Lusaka Province is one of the ten provinces of Zambia. It is the smallest in terms of land area, covering 21,896 km^{2}. However, it is the most populated and densely populated province in Zambia, with a population of 3,079,964 as of 2022 and a population density of 140 persons per km^{2}.

The provincial capital is Lusaka, which is also the national capital of Zambia. Lusaka Province is the most urbanized province in the country, featuring the highest number of medical doctors and the lowest incidence of malaria. It shares borders with Central Province to the north, Southern Province to the south, Eastern Province to the east, and the countries of Zimbabwe and Mozambique to the south-east, separated by the Lower Zambezi National Park.

The province is known for its natural attractions, including the Lower Zambezi National Park, the Lunsemfwa River valley, and the lower Luangwa Valley in the north-east. The Kafue Flats lie in the south-western part of the province.

Lusaka Province also has rich cultural heritage, with various festivals celebrated by different ethnic groups. The Nkhombalyanga festival is celebrated in Chongwe District by the Soli people in July, the Dantho festival is celebrated in Luangwa District by the Chikunda people in September, and the Chakwela Makumbi festival is celebrated in Chongwe District by the Soli people in September.

The province is divided into six districts: Chilanga District, Chongwe District, Kafue District, Luangwa District, Lusaka, and Rufunsa District. The literacy rate was recorded at 83% in 2004, while the unemployment rate was 31%. The youth unemployment rate stood at 52% as of 2008.

Lusaka Province is also home to two airports: Kenneth Kaunda International Airport, which is located in Chongwe District but serves Lusaka, and Lusaka City Airport, which is situated within Lusaka.

== Geography ==
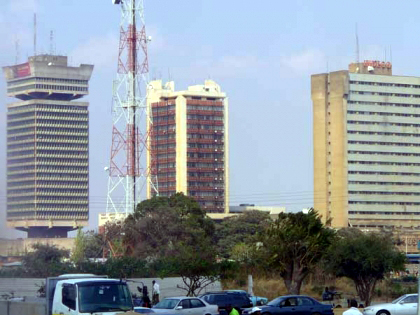
Lusaka, the capital city of the country and the province

Lusaka Province is bordered along Zimbabwe along Lower Zambezi National Park in the south, Central Province in the north, Southern Province in the southwest and Eastern Province in the north east. The general topography of the province is characterized by uplifted planation surfaces. The general elevation of the nation as a whole is tended towards West to East from the Kalahari Basin. The level of land falls from the upper Congo towards the Zambezi depression in the South forming a plateau.

Kafue River is a tributary of Zambezi River and it has huge valleys breaking the plateau. The province lies in the watershed between Congo DR and Zambezi river systems. The province lies in the frontier formed between the continental divide separating the Atlantic Ocean and the Indian Ocean, which traverses from DR Congo to the south of Tanzania. There are three major seasons: a cool dry season from April to August, a hot dry season from August to November and a warm wet season from November to April. The maximum heat and rainfall, both are experienced during October. The annual rainfall is less than 750 mm in the region.

Climate data for Lusaka (Zambia)
Month	Jan	Feb	Mar	Apr	May	Jun	Jul	Aug	Sep	Oct	Nov	Dec	Year
Record high °C (°F)	26 (79)	25.9 (78.6)	28.7 (83.7)	25.8 (78.4)	24.2 (75.6)	22.6 (72.7)	22.5 (72.5)	25.1 (77.2)	28.7 (83.7)	30.3 (86.5)	29 (84)	26.3 (79.3)	30.3 (86.5)
Mean daily maximum °C (°F)	21.1 (70.0)	21 (70)	20.8 (69.4)	20.1 (68.2)	17.2 (63.0)	16.8 (62.2)	15.1 (59.2)	17 (63)	21.4 (70.5)	24.3 (75.7)	22.3 (72.1)	21.3 (70.3)	24.3 (75.7)
Mean daily minimum °C (°F)	17.1 (62.8)	16.9 (62.4)	16.2 (61.2)	15.8 (60.4)	12 (54)	11 (52)	9.2 (48.6)	11.3 (52.3)	14.4 (57.9)	19.2 (66.6)	17.6 (63.7)	17.3 (63.1)	9.2 (48.6)
Average precipitation mm (inches)	250 (9.8)	194 (7.6)	137 (5.4)	31 (1.2)	4 (0.2)	1 (0.0)	1 (0.0)	0 (0)	2 (0.1)	16 (0.6)	103 (4.1)	231 (9.1)	970 (38.2)
Source 1:
Source 2:

== Demography ==
Historical population
Year	Pop.	±%
1969	353,975	—
1980	691,054	+95.2%
1990	987,106	+42.8%
2000	1,391,329	+41.0%
2010	2,238,569	+60.9%
2022	3,079,964	+37.6%

As per 2022 Zambian Census, Lusaka's population was 3,079,964, making it the most populated province. The majority of this population is concentrated in its smallest district, which is Lusaka District, with its population of 2,204,059 at the 2022 Census, with a population density of 5,272.9 people per km^{2}.

The province has the population highest growth rate, with an average of 4.6%, compared to the national growth rate of 2.8%. In 2000, it was the second most populated province from the Copperbelt province, with a population of 1,391,329. However, as of the 2010 census growth rate, Lusaka had surpassed the Copperbelt as the most populated province.

=== Ethnicity ===
Lusaka is an ethnically diverse province and is the only province in Zambia without a single ethnic group making up a third of the Population. The Bemba form the largest ethnicity at 20.2%, while the largest ethnic cluster is the Nyanja cluster (comprising Chewa, Nsenga, Chikunda, Kunda and Ngoni) making up 30.5%. The native Soil, Goba and Chikunda people only markup 0.8%,0.6% and 1.2% respectively. Other natives are the Nsenga Luzi (of Luangwa District).

There is also a considerable presence of Europeans, Asians and other African nationalities.

ETHNICITY	PERCENTAGE
BEMBA	20.2
TONGA	11.1
NSENGA	10.8
CHEWA	10.5
NGONI	7
TUMBUKA	5.4
LOZI	4.8
SOLI	3.2
MAMBWE	2.9
NAMWANGA	2.4
LENJE	2.2
KAONDE	2.1
LALA	1.5
LUVALE	1.4
CHIKUNDA	1.2
LAMBA	1.1
KUNDA	1
LUNDA(NWP)	0.9
ILA	0.8
LUNDA(LP)	0.6
BISA	0.6
GOBA	0.6
NYANJA	0.6
USHI	0.5
SENGA	0.5
OTHERS	6.1

=== Languages ===
The most spoken language in Lusaka is ciNyanja, a language that exhibits the melting pot that the Province has become. ciNyanja is a lingua franca which is close to ciChewa, ChiNsenga, other languages of Eastern Province and notable influence from Nguni languages. The contemporary Lusaka Nyanja has incorporated a lot of borrowed words from English and other languages, due to the massive influx of people from the entire Southern and Central African region.

Bemba is another language that is common, Tonga is spoken in pockets of the province. While English was the fastest growing language between 2000 and 2010. There is no clear distinction between dialects and languages in mainstream Zambia. Therefore, languages in the diagrams below will be grouped and listed individually.

LANGUAGE	PERCENTAGE
NYANJA	61.9
BEMBA	17.6
ENGLISH	6.2
TONGA	4.3
SOLI	1.7
NSENGA	1.6
LOZI	1.3
CHEWA	1.2
LENJE	0.6
OTHERS	3.6

== National Parks and culture ==
The Lower Zambezi National Park, parts of the Lunsemfwa River valley and the lower Luangwa Valley in the north-east and part of the Kafue Flats in the south-west are the major National parks and game area in Lusaka Province. The Nkhombalyanga festival celebrated in Chongwe District by Soli tribe during July, Dantho festival celebrated in Luangwa District by Chikunda tribe during September, Chakwela Makumbi festival celebrated in Chongwe District by Soli tribe during September, Mbambara festival celebrated in Luangwa District by Nsenga Luzi tribe during November, Chibwela Kumushi festival celebrated in Luangwa District by Soli tribe during November, Kailala festival celebrated in Kafue District by Goba tribe during November and Chibwela Kumushi festival celebrated in Luangwa District by Soli tribe during November are the major festivals celebrated in the Province.

== Administration ==
Profession	% of working population
Agriculture, Forestry & Fishing (by Industry)	4.80
Community, Social and Personnel	33.90
Construction	35.80
Electricity, Gas, and water	26.80
Financial & Insurance	43.10
Hotels and Restaurants	36.70
Manufacturing	27.10
Mining & Quarrying	9.30
Transportation and Storage	37.00
Wholesale & Retail Trade	32.30

Provincial administration is set up purely for administrative purposes. The province is headed by a minister appointed by the President, and there are ministries of central government for each province. The administrative head of the province is the Permanent Secretary, appointed by the President. There is a Deputy Permanent Secretary, heads of government departments and civil servants at the provincial level. Lusaka Province is divided into six districts, namely, Chilanga District, Chongwe District, Kafue District, Luangwa District, Lusaka District and Rufunsa District. All the district headquarters are the same as the district names. There are six councils in the province, each of which is headed by an elected representative, called a councilor. Each councilor holds office for three years. The administrative staff of the council is selected by a Local Government Service Commission from within or outside the district. The office of the provincial government is located in each of the district headquarters and has provincial local government officers and auditors. Each council is responsible for raising and collecting local taxes and the budgets of the council are audited and submitted every year after the annual budget. The elected members of the council do not draw salaries, but are paid allowances by the council. Lusaka is a province and Zambia's capital city is also Lusaka with one city council. The government stipulates 63 different functions for the councils, with the majority of them being infrastructure management and local administration. Councils are mandated to maintain each of their community centres, zoos, local parks, drainage system, playgrounds, cemeteries, caravan sites, libraries, museums and art galleries. They also work along with specific government departments to help with agriculture, conservation of natural resources, postal services, and establishing and maintaining hospitals, schools and colleges. The councils prepare schemes that encourage community participation.

== Economy and education ==
HIV infected & AIDS deaths
Year	HIV infected	AIDS deaths
1985	1,518	107
1990	23,828	640
1995	111,753	4,786
2000	155,729	12,188
2005	155,687	16,569
2010	141,663	15,429

As of 2004, the province had 502 basic schools, 39 high schools and 502 school for children out of school aged between 7 and 15 . The unemployment rate was 31%, and the general unemployment rate for youth was 52% as of 2008. The province had 231 doctors as of 2005. There were 313 Malaria incidence for every 1,000 people in the province as of 2005 and there were 15,429 AIDS death as of 2010.

The total area of crops planted during the year 2014 in the province was 82,603.72 hectares, which constituted 4.35% of the total area cultivated in Zambia. The net production stood at 234,807 metric tonnes, which formed 5.76% of the total agricultural production in the country. Wheat was the major crop in the province with 48,510 metric tonnes, constituting 24.07% of the national output. Kenneth Kaunda International Airport and Lusaka City Airport are the two airports in the province.

== See also ==
- Bibliography of the history of Zambia § Lusaka
