= Dwarf barb =

Dwarf barb is a common name of several different tropical freshwater fish species, including:

- Enteromius brevidorsalis
- Puntius gelius
- Puntius phutunio
