= Yellow lizard =

Yellow lizard may refer to:

- Moorea
- Yellow Monitor
- Yellow-spotted tropical night lizard
- Yellow-throated Plated Lizard
