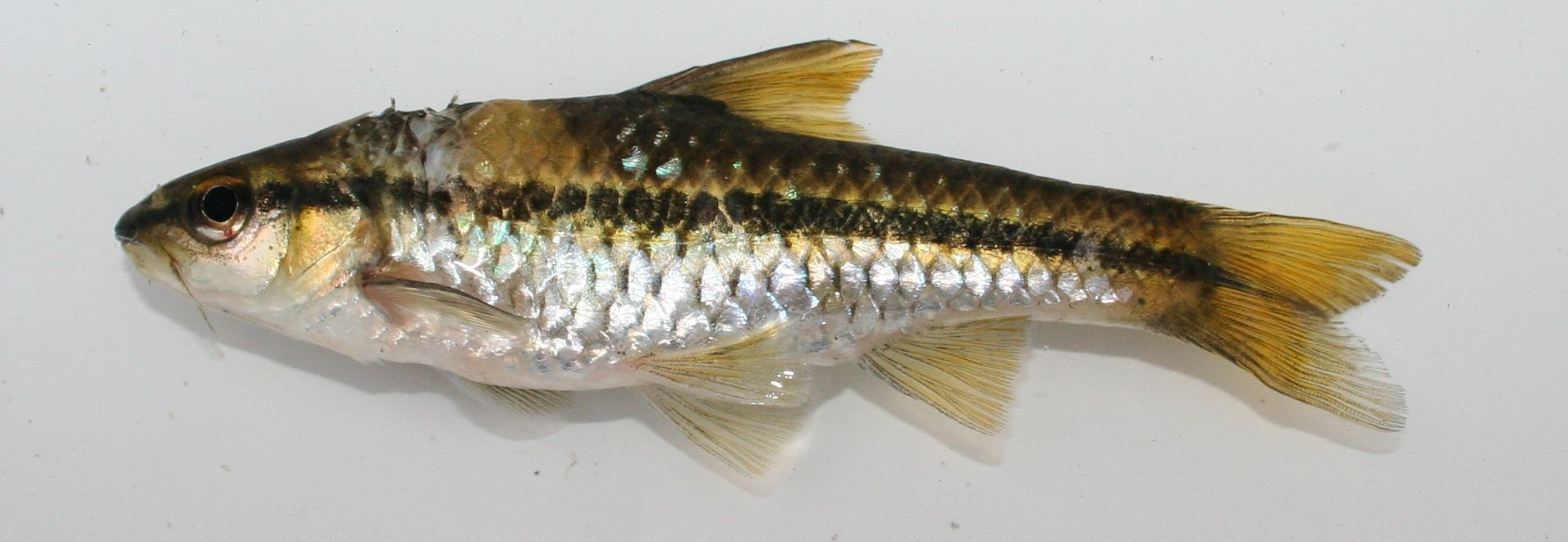
- Enteromius eutaenia (Boulenger, 1904) collected in Lavushi Manda National Park, Zambia

Conservation status
- Least Concern (IUCN 3.1)

Scientific classification
- Kingdom: Animalia
- Phylum: Chordata
- Class: Actinopterygii
- Division: Teleostei
- Order: Cypriniformes
- Family: Cyprinidae
- Subfamily: Smiliogastrinae
- Genus: Enteromius
- Species: E. eutaenia

Binomial name
- Enteromius eutaenia (Boulenger, 1904)

Synonyms
- Barbus eutaenia Boulenger, 1904

= Orangefin barb =

Species of fish

The orangefin barb (Enteromius eutaenia) is a species of cyprinid fish in the genus Enteromius. This species may actually be a species complex, it is widely distributed in southern and central Africa. It is caught as food and kept as an ornamental fish in hobby aquariums. It grows to 14 cm SL, but is generally around nine cm.

It favours clear-flowing waters, usually headwater streams with rocky habitats, although it is known from sandy streams in the Caprivi Strip. This fish will ascend tributaries during the dry season, and move only onto floodplains in rainy season. It feeds on insects.
