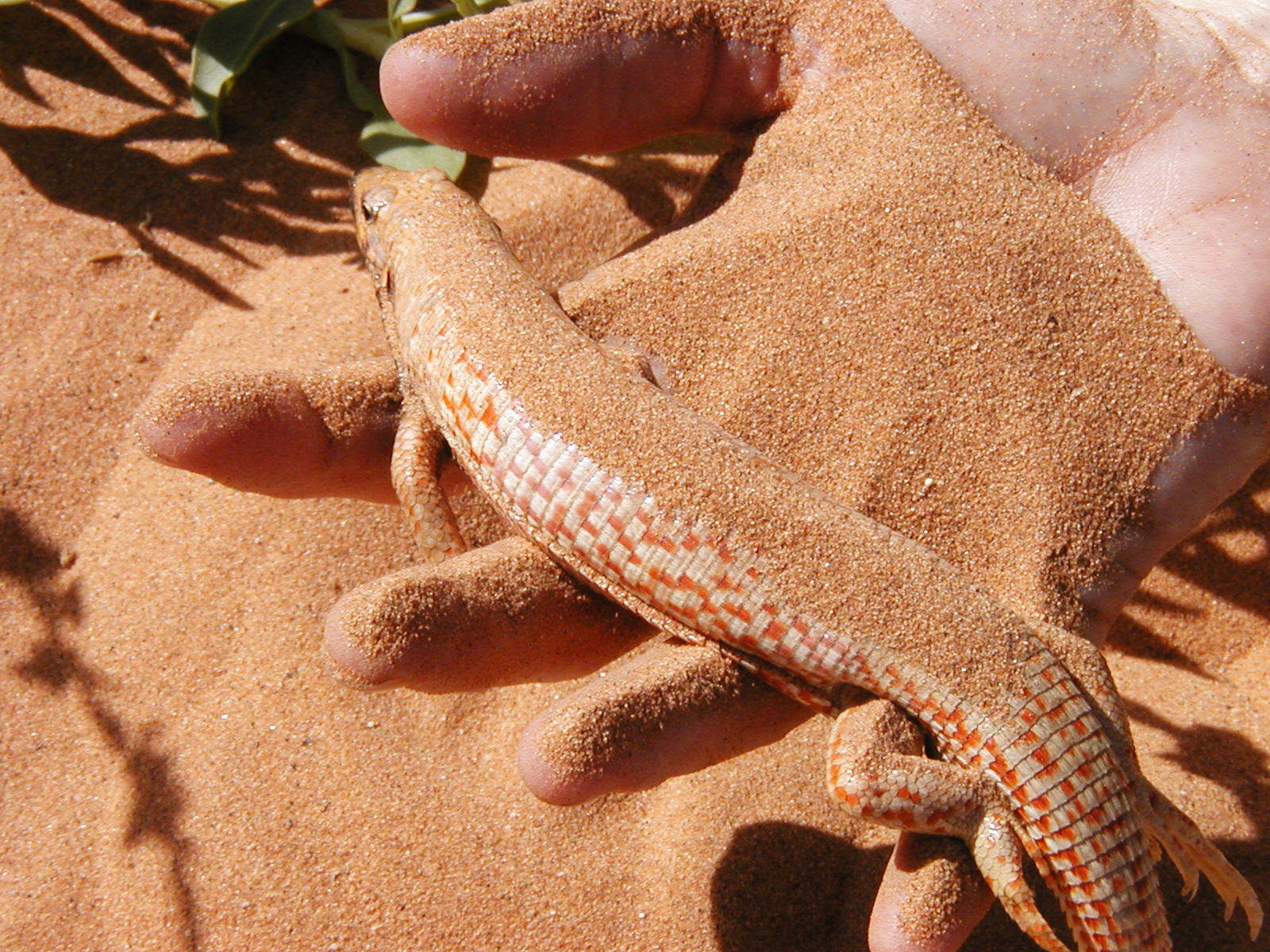

Conservation status
- Least Concern (IUCN 3.1)

Scientific classification
- Kingdom: Animalia
- Phylum: Chordata
- Class: Reptilia
- Order: Squamata
- Family: Gerrhosauridae
- Genus: Gerrhosaurus
- Species: G. skoogi

Binomial name
- Gerrhosaurus skoogi Andersson, 1916

Synonyms
- Gerrhosaurus skoogi Andersson, 1916

= Desert plated lizard =

Species of reptile

The desert plated lizard (Gerrhosaurus skoogi) is a reptile species endemic to the northern Namib Desert in Namibia and Angola. Also known as the sand plated lizard, It is diurnal.

== Etymology ==
The specific name, skoogi, is in honor of Hilmer Nils Erik Skoog (1870–1927), who was Curator of the Götesborgs Naturhistoriska museum from 1904 to 1927.

== Taxonomy ==
In 1916 Andersson described this lizard as a new species, naming it Gerrhosaurus skoogi. In 1953 FitzSimons assigned the species to a new genus Angolosaurus. Recent studies suggest that this monotypic genus is synonymous to Gerrhosaurus and makes it paraphyletic; therefore A. skoogi was reclassified as Gerrhosaurus skoogi.

== Ecology ==
Gerrhosaurus skoogi mostly eats plants, but it also forages for beetles and other small arthropods that live within the sand dunes that the lizard inhabits. G. skoogi is considered to be a sand-diving lizard and can move efficiently through sand dunes.
