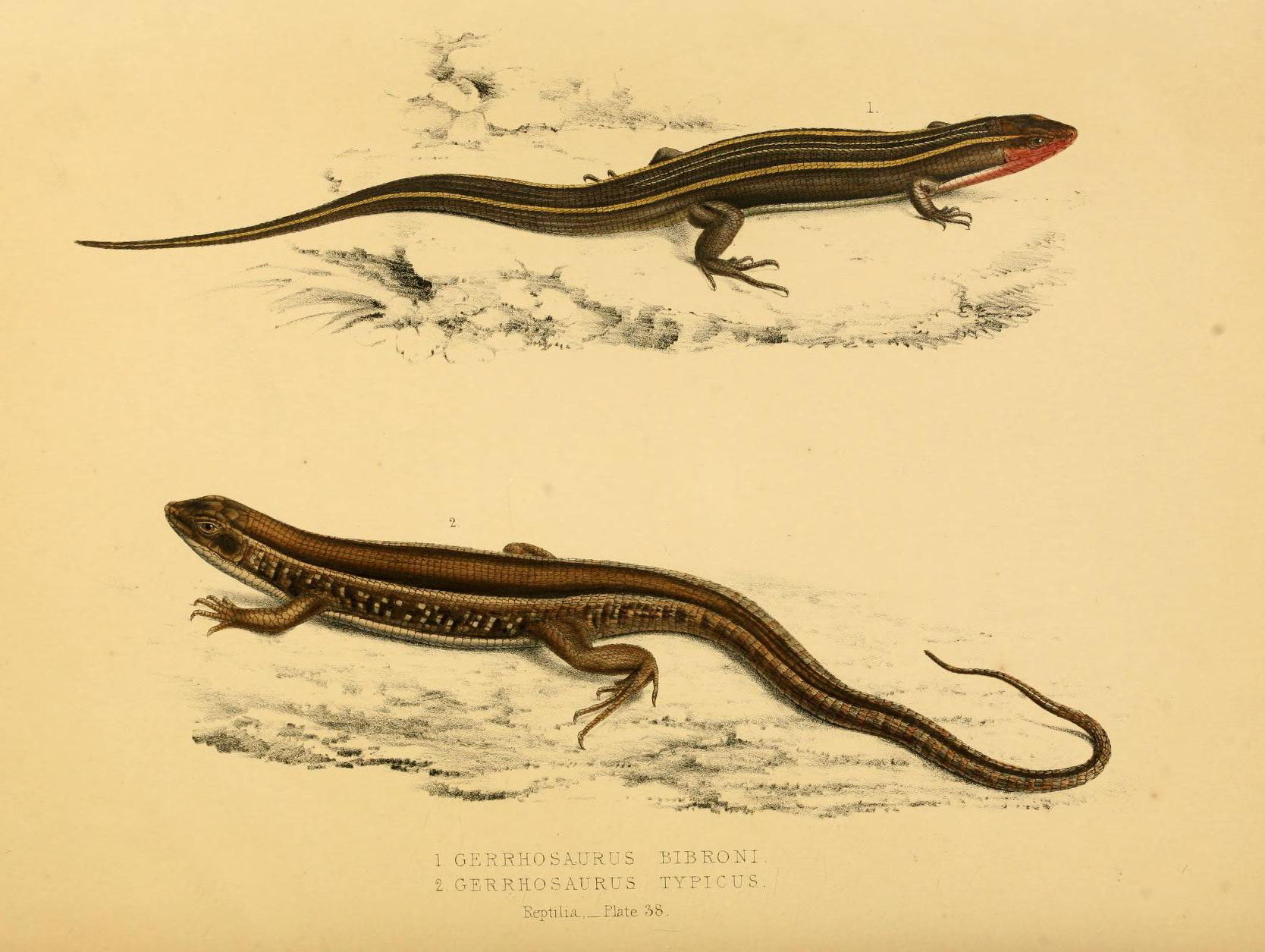

Conservation status
- Least Concern (IUCN 3.1)

Scientific classification
- Kingdom: Animalia
- Phylum: Chordata
- Class: Reptilia
- Order: Squamata
- Suborder: Scinciformata
- Infraorder: Scincomorpha
- Family: Gerrhosauridae
- Genus: Gerrhosaurus
- Species: G. typicus

Binomial name
- Gerrhosaurus typicus A. Smith, 1837

= Namaqua plated lizard =

Species of lizard

The Namaqua plated lizard or Karoo plated lizard (Gerrhosaurus typicus) is a species of lizard in the Gerrhosauridae family. It is endemic to South Africa.
