= Gerrhosaurus multilineatus =

Conservation status
- Least Concern (IUCN 3.1)

Scientific classification
- Kingdom: Animalia
- Phylum: Chordata
- Class: Reptilia
- Order: Squamata
- Family: Gerrhosauridae
- Genus: Gerrhosaurus
- Species: G. multilineatus

Binomial name
- Gerrhosaurus multilineatus Bocage, 1866

Species of lizard

The keeled plated lizard (Gerrhosaurus multilineatus) is a species of lizard in the Gerrhosauridae family. It is found in Angola, Democratic Republic of the Congo, Zambia, Namibia, and Botswana.
