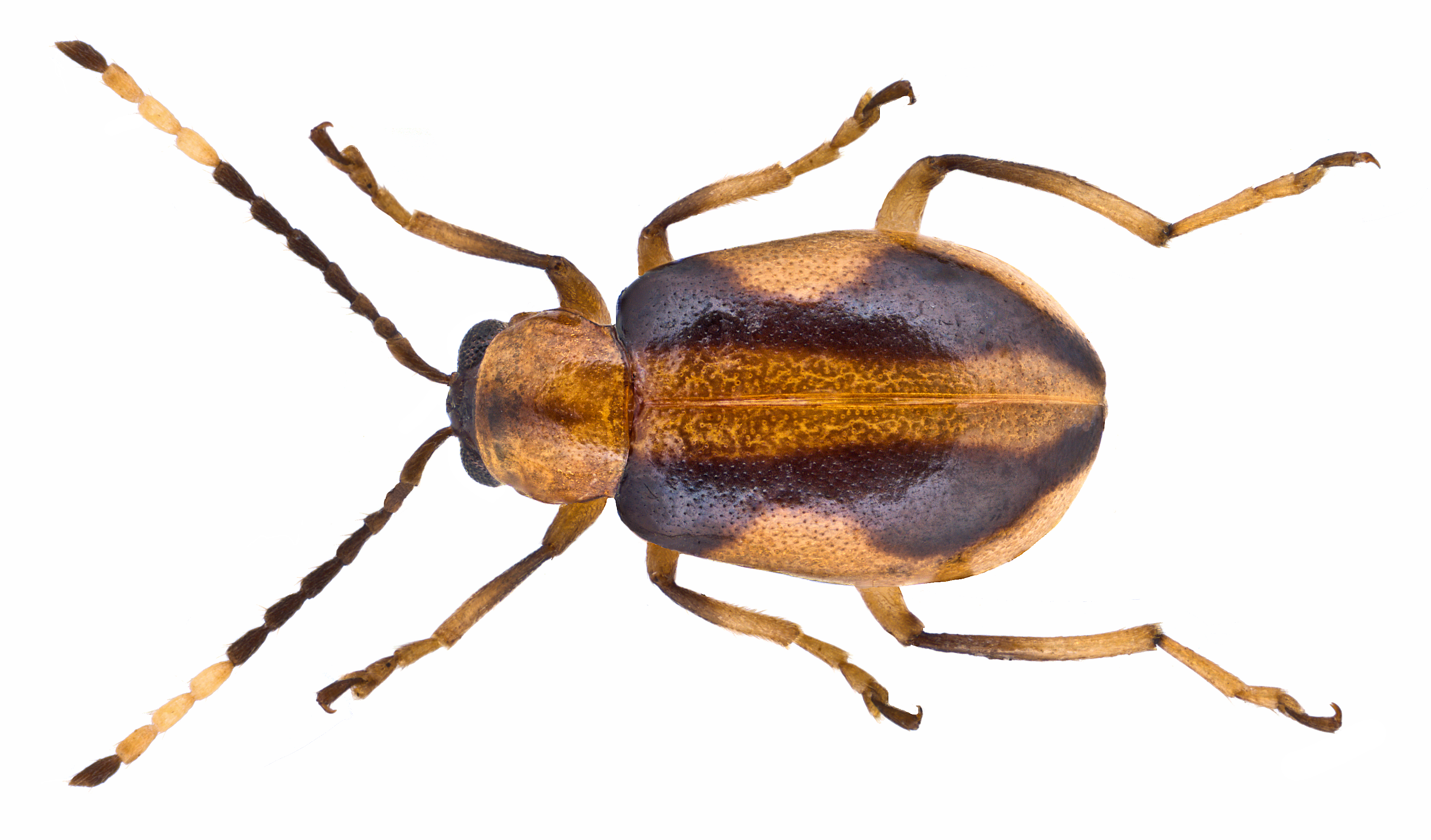

Scientific classification
- Kingdom: Animalia
- Phylum: Arthropoda
- Clade: Pancrustacea
- Class: Insecta
- Order: Coleoptera
- Suborder: Polyphaga
- Infraorder: Cucujiformia
- Family: Chrysomelidae
- Genus: Medythia
- Species: M. suturalis

Binomial name
- Medythia suturalis (Motschulsky, 1858)

= Medythia suturalis =

Species of beetle

Medythia suturalis, commonly known as striped bean flea beetle, is a species of leaf beetle found in China, India, Sri Lanka, Japan, Laos, Myanmar, North Korea, Philippines, South Korea, Taiwan, Vietnam, and Russia.

It is a major pest of beans and peas.

== Description ==
Body length is about 2.8 mm.
