= Lavushimanda District =

- District
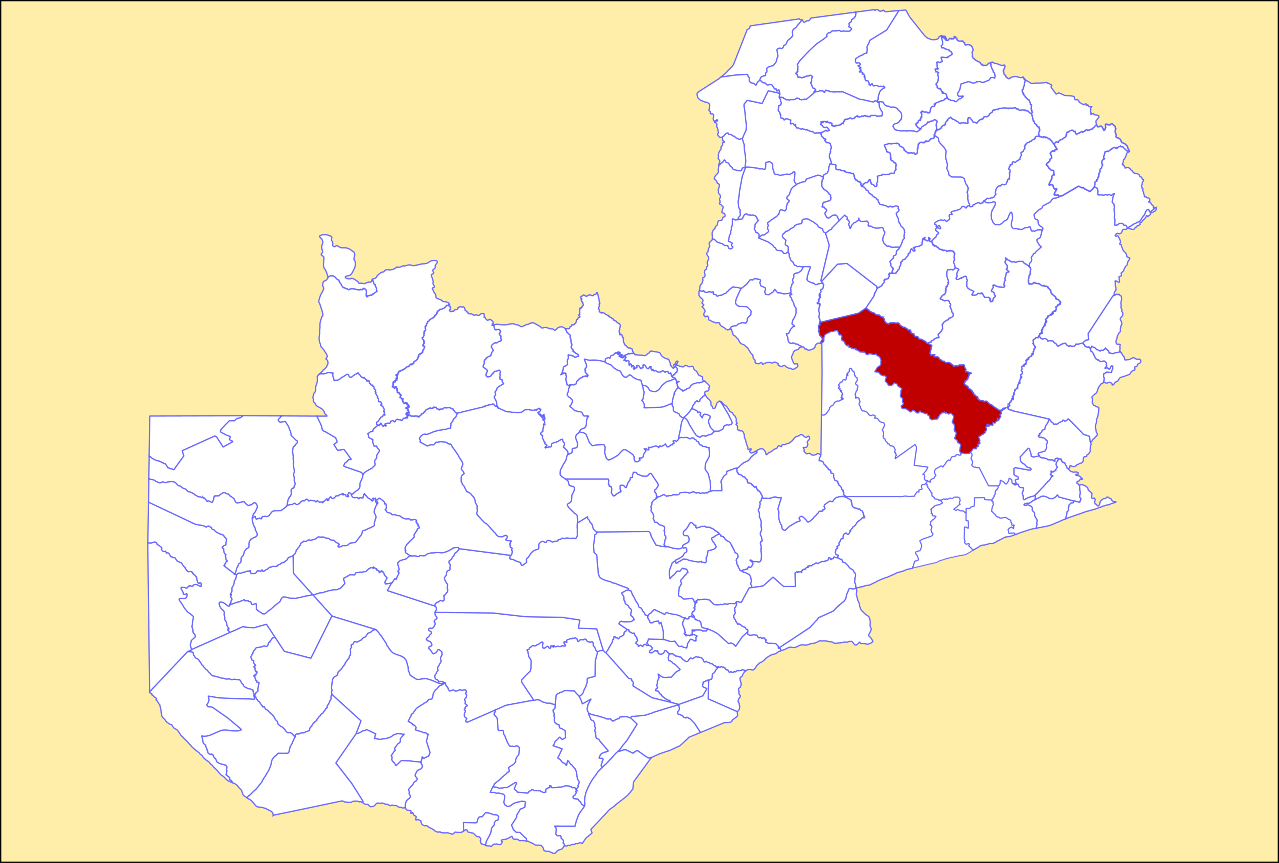
- District location in Zambia
- Country: Zambia
- Province: Muchinga Province

Area
  - Total: 14,388.4 km^{2} (5,555.4 sq mi)

Population (2022)
  - Total: 55,755
  - Density: 3.8750/km^{2} (10.036/sq mi)
- Time zone: UTC+2 (CAT)

Lavushimanda District is a district of Muchinga Province, Zambia. It was named after the Lavushi Manda National Park and separated from Mpika District in 2017. It also contains a town centre of the same name on the Great North Road. As of the 2022 Zambian Census, the district had a population of 55,755 people.
