= Gerrhosaurus bulsi =

Conservation status
- Least Concern (IUCN 3.1)

Scientific classification
- Kingdom: Animalia
- Phylum: Chordata
- Class: Reptilia
- Order: Squamata
- Family: Gerrhosauridae
- Genus: Gerrhosaurus
- Species: G. bulsi

Binomial name
- Gerrhosaurus bulsi Laurent, 1954

Species of lizard

Laurent's plated lizard (Gerrhosaurus bulsi) is a species of lizard in the Gerrhosauridae family. It is found in Angola, Democratic Republic of the Congo, and Zambia.
