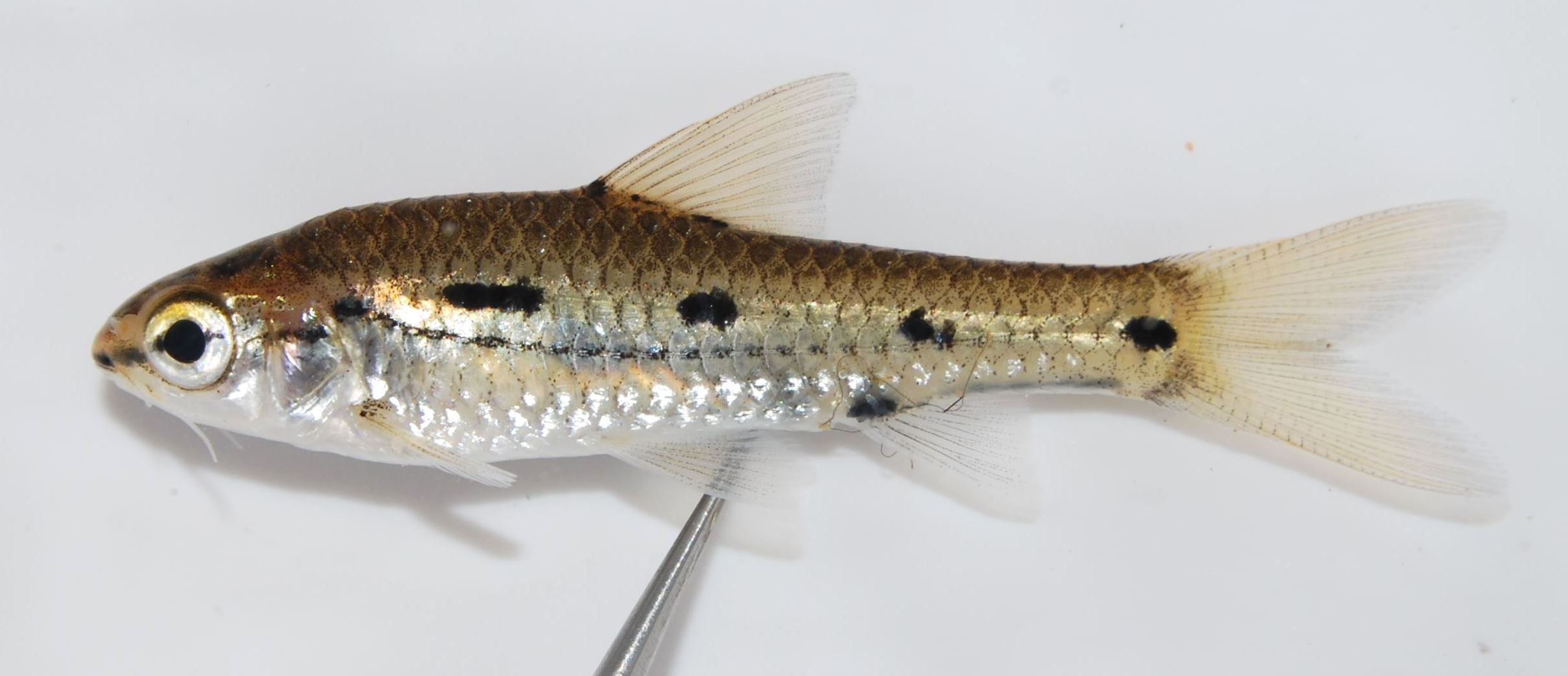
- Enteromius bifrenatus collected in Lavushi Manda National Park, Zambia

Conservation status
- Least Concern (IUCN 3.1)

Scientific classification
- Kingdom: Animalia
- Phylum: Chordata
- Class: Actinopterygii
- Order: Cypriniformes
- Family: Cyprinidae
- Subfamily: Smiliogastrinae
- Genus: Enteromius
- Species: E. bifrenatus

Binomial name
- Enteromius bifrenatus Fowler, 1935

Synonyms
- Barbus bifrenatus

= Hyphen barb =

Species of fish

The hyphen barb (Enteromius bifrenatus) is a species of ray-finned fish in the family Cyprinidae.

It is found in Angola, Botswana, Republic of the Congo, Malawi, Mozambique, Namibia, South Africa, Zambia, and Zimbabwe.

Its natural habitat is rivers. It is not considered a threatened species by the IUCN.
