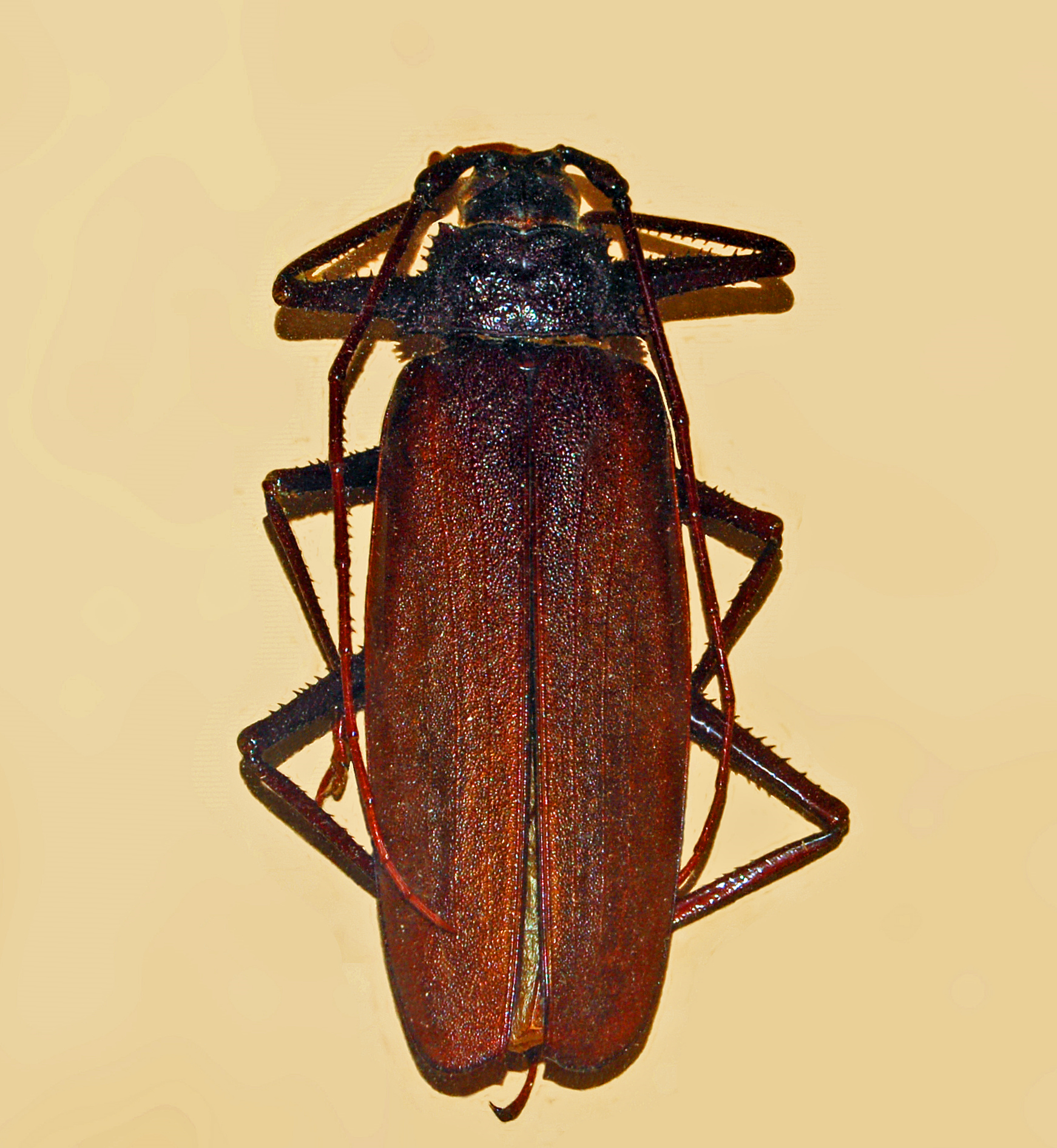
- From São Tomé and Príncipe

Scientific classification
- Kingdom: Animalia
- Phylum: Arthropoda
- Class: Insecta
- Order: Coleoptera
- Suborder: Polyphaga
- Infraorder: Cucujiformia
- Family: Cerambycidae
- Genus: Macrotoma
- Species: M. serripes

Binomial name
- Macrotoma serripes (Fabricius, 1781)

Synonyms
- Macrotoma castaneipennis Kolbe, 1894; Macrotoma prionopus White, 1853; Prionus serripes Fabricius, 1781

= Macrotoma serripes =

Species of beetle

Macrotoma serripes is a species of beetle belonging to the family Cerambycidae.

== Description ==
Macrotoma serripes can reach a length of about 45–74 millimetres (1.8–2.9 in). Main host plants are Albizia adianthifolia, Albizia gummifera, Citrus medica, Cola acuminata, Parkia filicoidea and Sterculia tragacantha.

== Distribution ==
This species can be found in Nigeria, Cameroon, Central Africa, Democratic Republic of the Congo and Angola.
