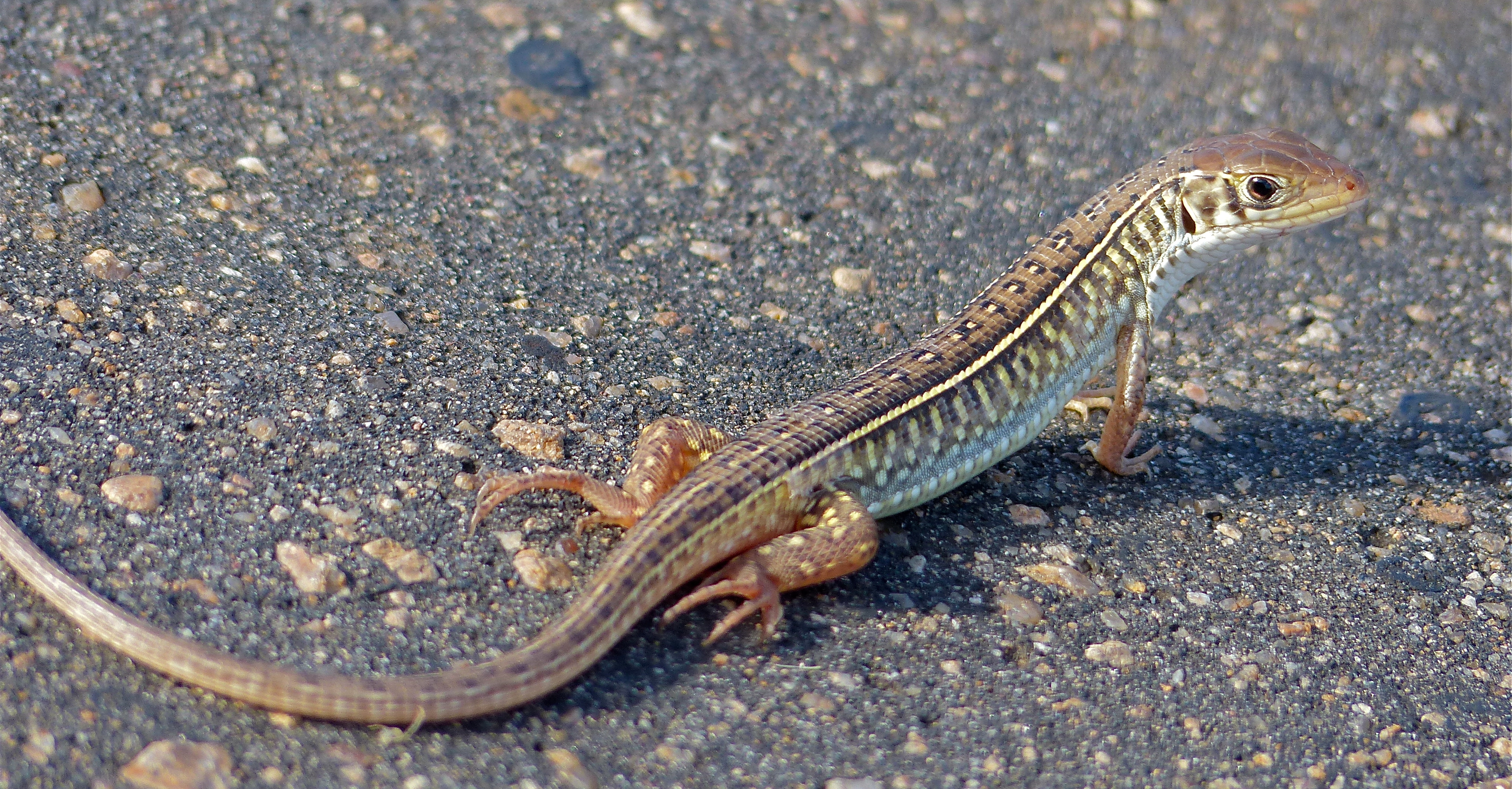
- G. flavigularis in the Kruger N. P.

Scientific classification
- Domain: Eukaryota
- Kingdom: Animalia
- Phylum: Chordata
- Class: Reptilia
- Order: Squamata
- Family: Gerrhosauridae
- Subfamily: Gerrhosaurinae
- Genus: Gerrhosaurus; Wiegmann, 1828

= Gerrhosaurus =

Genus of lizards

Gerrhosaurus is a genus of lizards native to southern and eastern Africa.

== Habitat ==
Species of Gerrhosaurus are found in dry, rocky semi-open habitats.

== Species and subspecies ==
The following species and subspecies are recognized as being valid. Some have been reassigned to new genera.

- Gerrhosaurus auritus Boettger, 1887 – Kalahari plated lizard
- Gerrhosaurus bulsi Laurent, 1954
- Gerrhosaurus flavigularis Wiegmann, 1828 – yellow-throated plated lizard
  - Gerrhosaurus flavigularis fitzsimonsi Loveridge, 1942
  - Gerrhosaurus flavigularis flavigularis Wiegmann, 1828
- Gerrhosaurus multilineatus Bocage, 1866
- Gerrhosaurus nigrolineatus Hallowell, 1857 – black-lined plated lizard
  - Gerrhosaurus nigrolineatus ahlefeldti Hellmich & Schmelcher, 1956
  - Gerrhosaurus nigrolineatus nigrolineatus Hallowell, 1857
- Gerrhosaurus skoogi Andersson, 1916 – desert plated lizard
- Gerrhosaurus typicus A. Smith, 1837 – Namaqua plated lizard
