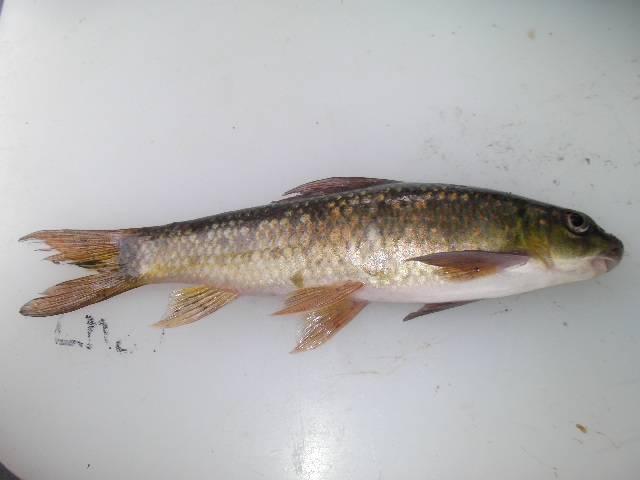

Conservation status
- Least Concern (IUCN 3.1)

Scientific classification
- Kingdom: Animalia
- Phylum: Chordata
- Class: Actinopterygii
- Order: Cypriniformes
- Family: Cyprinidae
- Subfamily: Labeoninae
- Genus: Labeo
- Species: L. cylindricus

Binomial name
- Labeo cylindricus W. K. H. Peters, 1852

Synonyms
- Labeo montanus (Günther, 1889); Tylognathus cantini Sauvage, 1882; Tylognathus montanus Günther, 1889; Labeo darlingi Boulenger, 1902; Labeo parvulus Gilchrist & Thompson, 1913; Labeo kilossae Steindachner, 1914; Labeo loveridgei Regan, 1920

= Redeye labeo =

Species of fish

The redeye labeo or African carp (Labeo cylindricus) is a species of fish in the cyprinid genus Labeo. It is a freshwater fish endemic to the rivers of East Africa, from the Zambezi through the Limpopo and Komati Rivers to the Pongola River. It also inhabits upper and middle parts of the Congo River.

== Appearance ==
The body of the fish is cylindrical and it has a characteristic protruded snout, usually with star shaped tubercles on it. The mouth is large and the lips fleshy. The general colour is yellow-green with a darker band stretching horizontal over the body. Older fish is a darker olive grey. The eyes are typically red and the fish reaches 23 cm (9.1 in) in length.

== Habitat ==
The species prefers clear, running waters in rocky habitats of small and large rivers, and is also found in lakes and dams over rocky areas. It feeds on diatoms and other small algae from the rocks. It migrates upstream in masses to breed, using the mouth and broad pectoral fins to climb damp surfaces of barrier rocks and weirs in the river.
