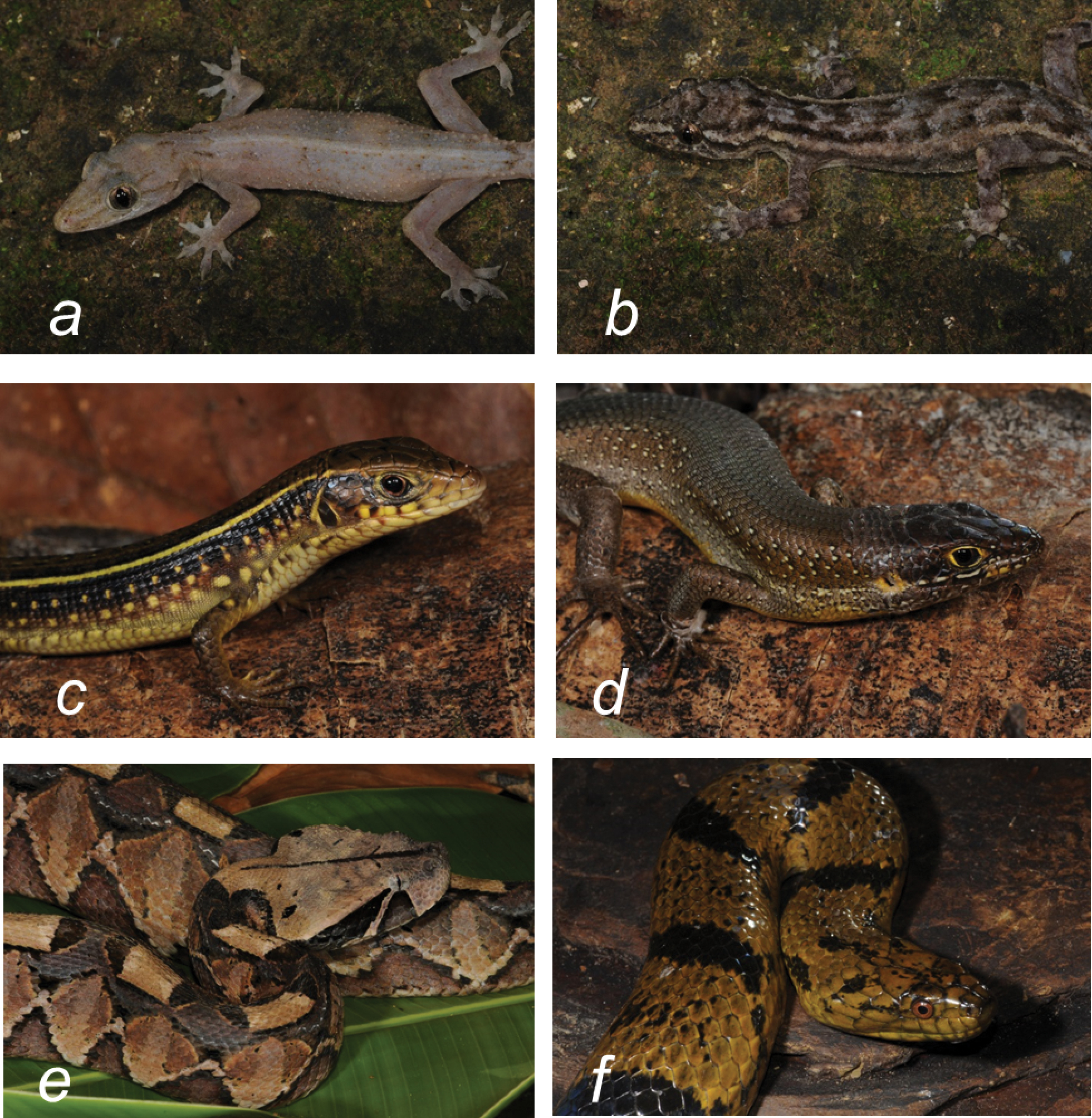
- Reptile species

Conservation status
- Least Concern (IUCN 3.1)

Scientific classification
- Kingdom: Animalia
- Phylum: Chordata
- Class: Reptilia
- Order: Squamata
- Family: Gerrhosauridae
- Genus: Gerrhosaurus
- Species: G. nigrolineatus

Binomial name
- Gerrhosaurus nigrolineatus Hallowell, 1857

= Gerrhosaurus nigrolineatus =

Species of lizard

The black-lined plated lizard (Gerrhosaurus nigrolineatus) is a species of lizard in the Gerrhosauridae family. It is found in Gabon, Democratic Republic of the Congo, Angola, Namibia, Tanzania, Botswana, Malawi, Mozambique, South Africa, Zimbabwe, Kenya, and Zambia.
