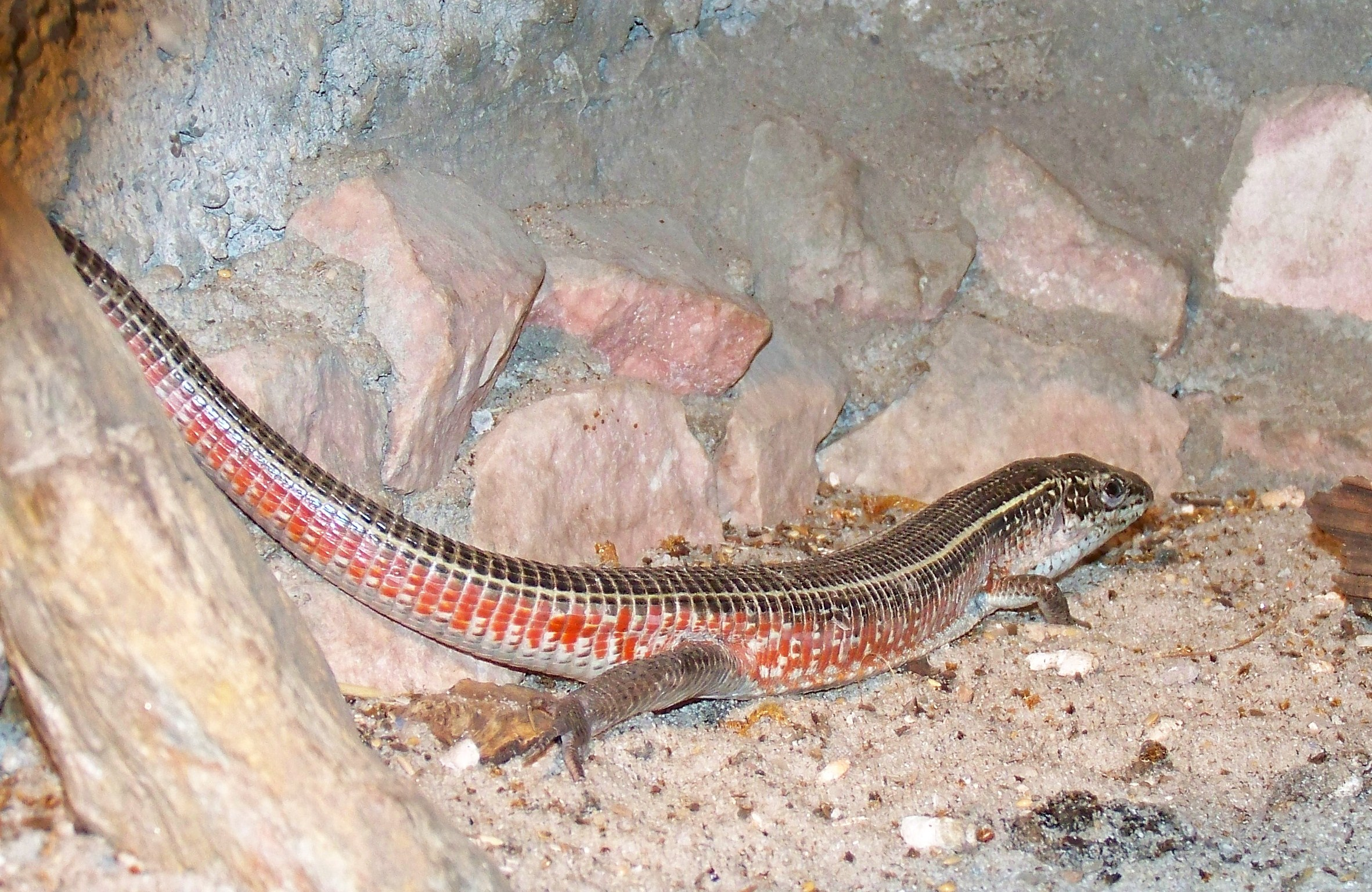

Conservation status
- Least Concern (IUCN 3.1)

Scientific classification
- Kingdom: Animalia
- Phylum: Chordata
- Class: Reptilia
- Order: Squamata
- Suborder: Scinciformata
- Infraorder: Scincomorpha
- Family: Gerrhosauridae
- Genus: Gerrhosaurus
- Species: G. flavigularis

Binomial name
- Gerrhosaurus flavigularis Wiegmann, 1828

= Yellow-throated plated lizard =

Species of lizard

The yellow-throated plated lizard or plated lizard (Gerrhosaurus flavigularis) is a species of lizard, which is about 45½ cm (18 inches) in total length (including tail) and lives in the grassland and scrub of Sudan, Ethiopia and along Eastern Africa down to South Africa.

== Description ==
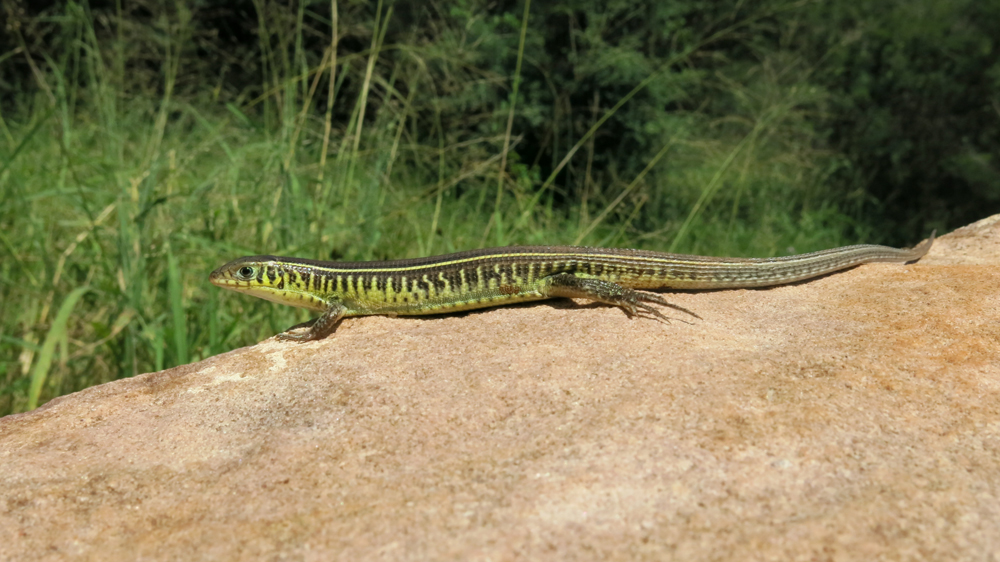
Juvenile Gerrhosaurus flavigularis, in the wild. Soutpansberg, South Africa.

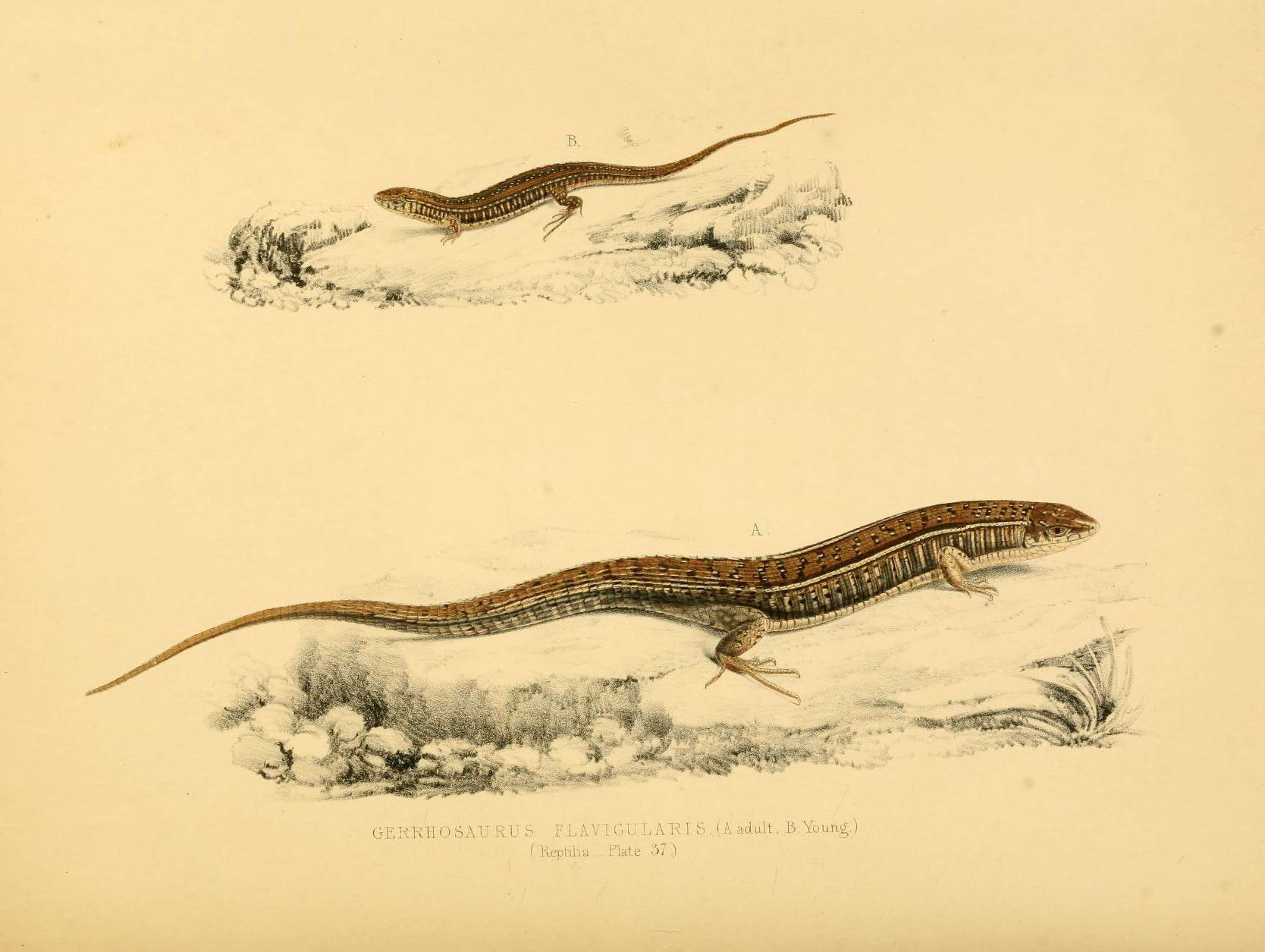
Illustration of juvenile and adult.

A ground-living and burrowing lizard, this species is usually greenish-grey or brownish, with a yellow (or sometimes red) throat and often a narrow stripe down each side. It is well armored, with hard body plates, and head shields fused to the skull. The tail is generally about two-thirds of the total length. Its limbs are well-developed, though its four five-toed feet are not specially adapted for digging. These lizards mate during the summer. In mating season the males head change color to either red, yellow or even light blue.

It was first described in 1828 by Weigmann, based on specimens at the Natural History Museum in Berlin that were collected in South Africa by Ludwig Krebs.

== Behaviour ==
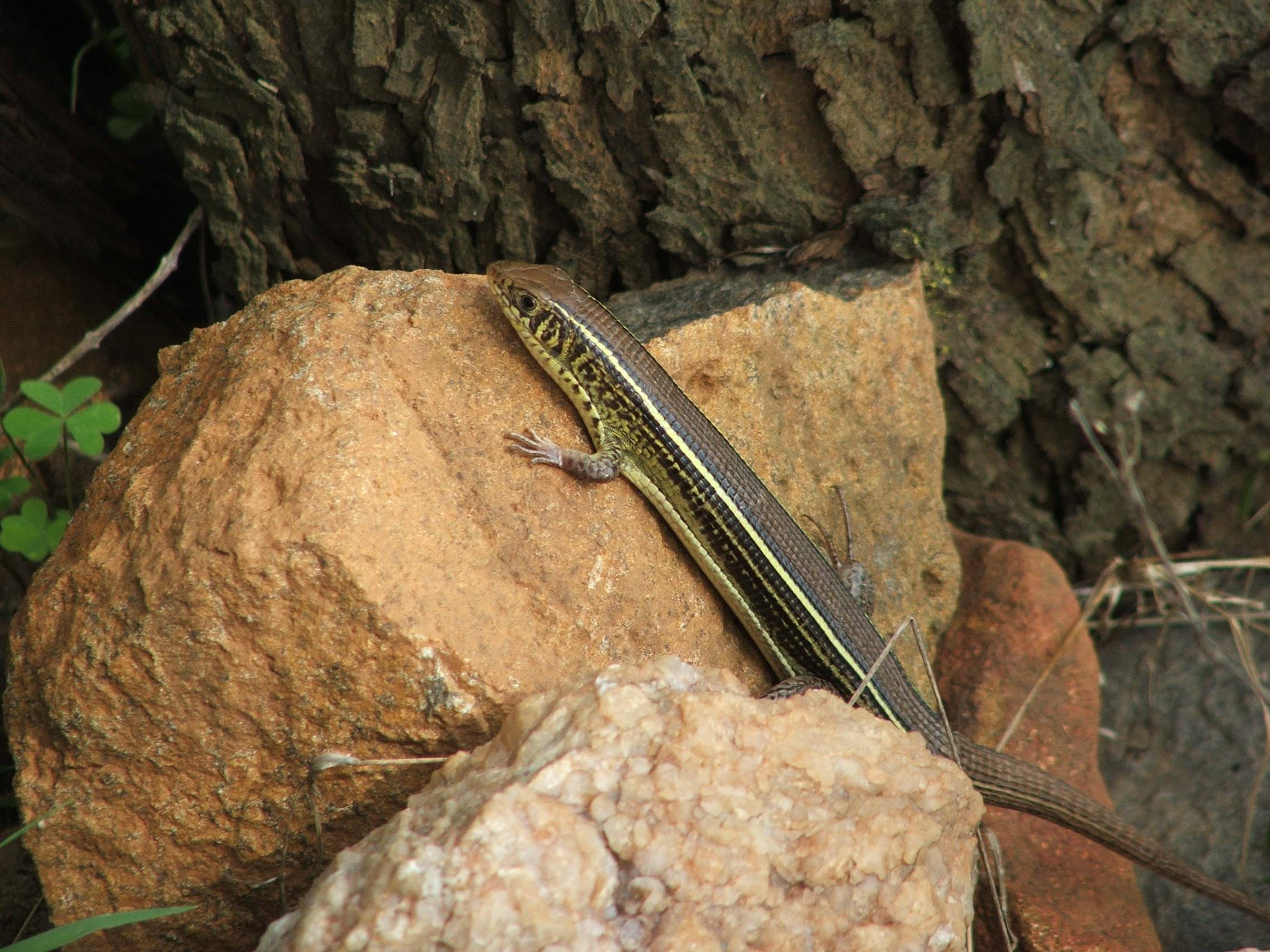
Yellow-throated plated lizard in its natural habitat

The lizard does most of its tunneling after rain when the ground is soft. Active by day, it hunts insects and is rarely seen, despite its size. It moves rapidly through the "grass" and at any sign of danger darts into its burrow, usually positioned under a bush.

The female plated lizard lays clutches of four or five eggs in a shallow pit which she excavates.
