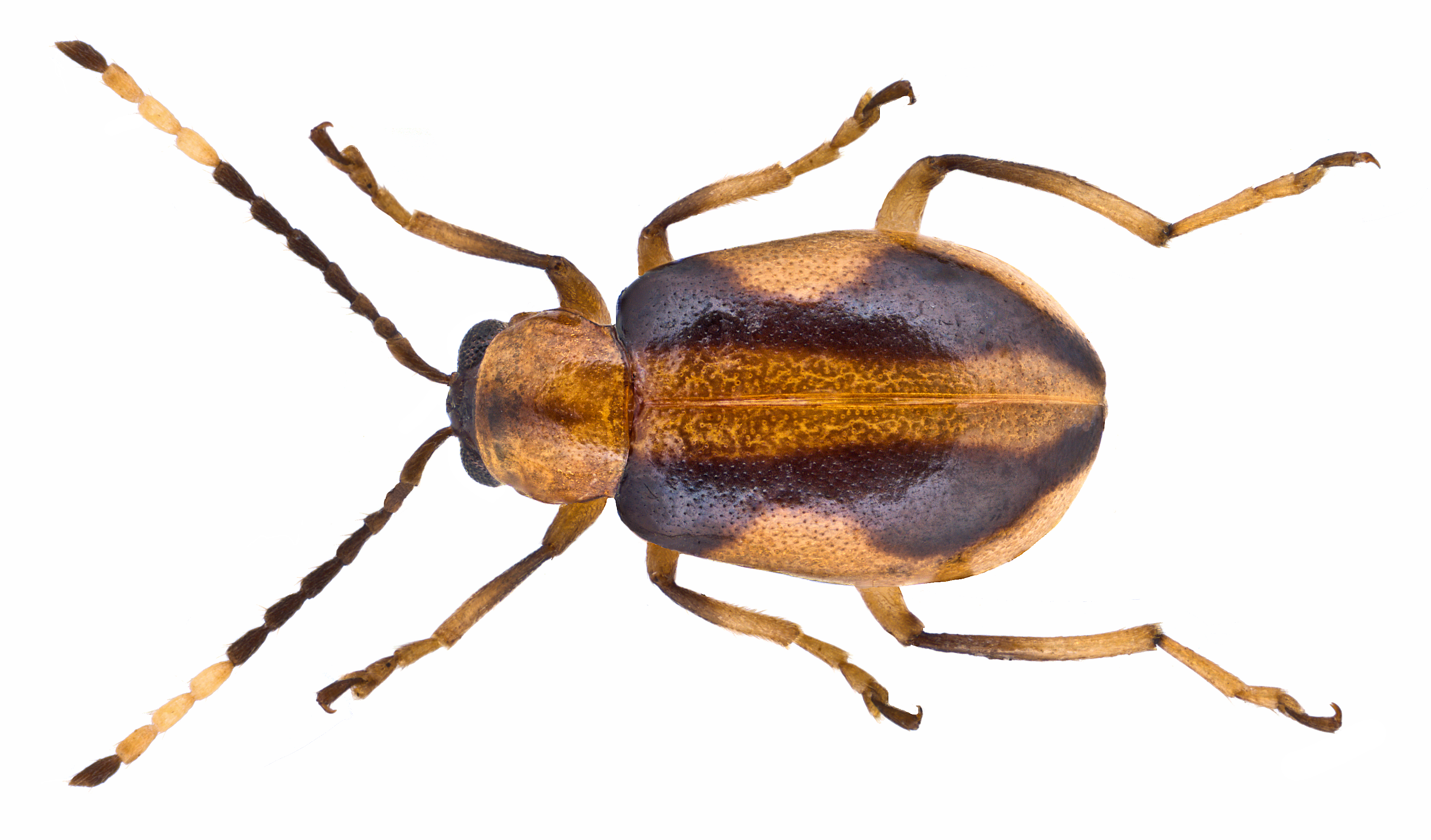
- Medythia suturalis

Scientific classification
- Kingdom: Animalia
- Phylum: Arthropoda
- Clade: Pancrustacea
- Class: Insecta
- Order: Coleoptera
- Suborder: Polyphaga
- Infraorder: Cucujiformia
- Family: Chrysomelidae
- Subfamily: Galerucinae
- Tribe: Luperini
- Subtribe: Luperina
- Genus: Medythia; Jacoby, 1887

= Medythia =

Genus of leaf beetles

Medythia is a genus of beetles belonging to the family Chrysomelidae.

The species of this genus are found in Africa and Southeastern Asia.

Species:

- Medythia quaterna (Fairmaire, 1880)
- Medythia suturalis (Motschulsky, 1858)
