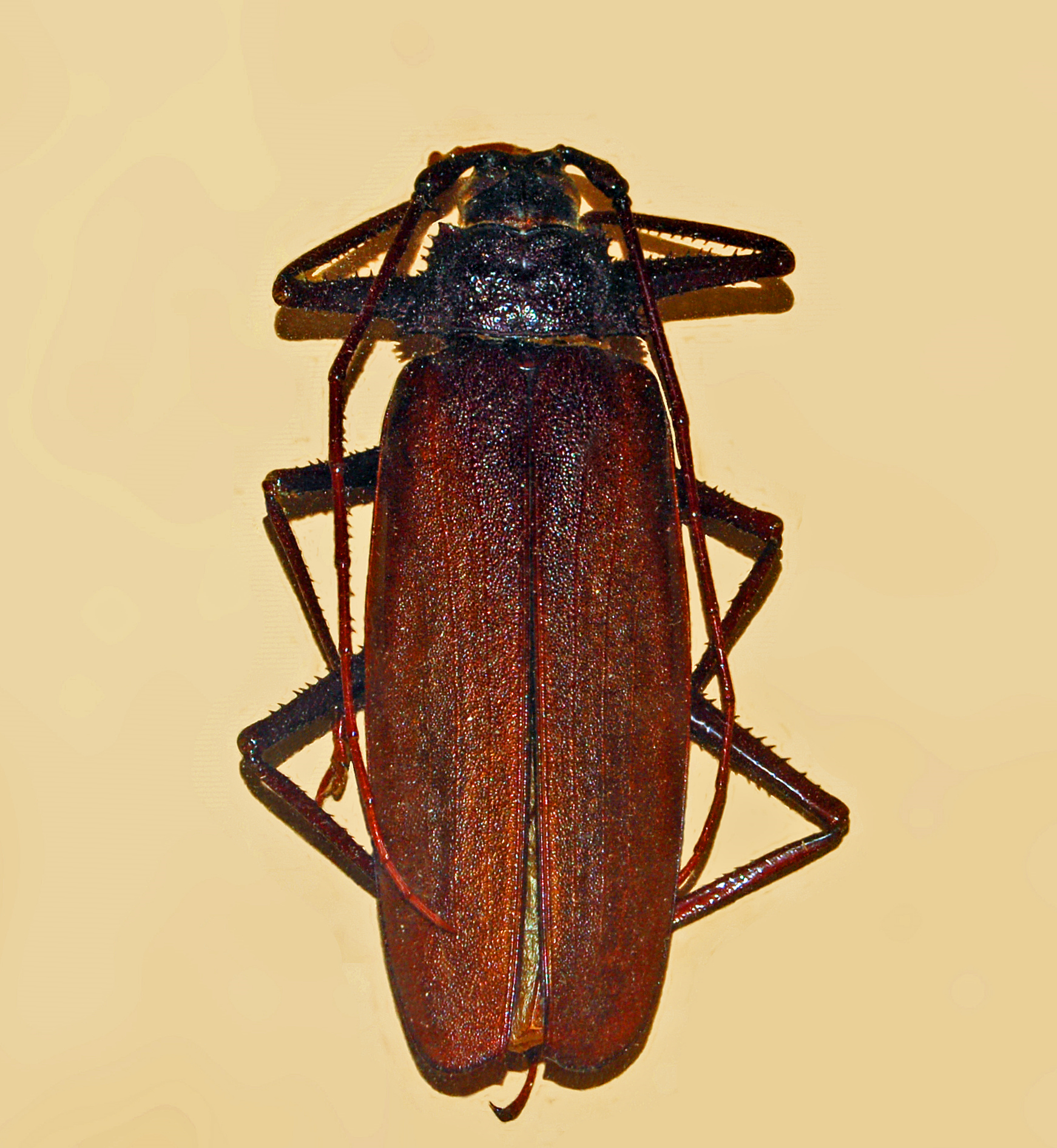
- Macrotoma serripes

Scientific classification
- Kingdom: Animalia
- Phylum: Arthropoda
- Class: Insecta
- Order: Coleoptera
- Suborder: Polyphaga
- Infraorder: Cucujiformia
- Family: Cerambycidae
- Subfamily: Prioninae
- Tribe: Macrodontiini
- Genus: Macrotoma; Audinet-Serville, 1832

Synonyms
- Dapsilus Gistel, 1848; Telotoma Quentin & Villiers, 1978

= Macrotoma =

Genus of beetles

Macrotoma is a genus of beetle belonging to the family Cerambycidae.

== List of species ==
The following species are recognised in the genus Macrotoma:

- Macrotoma androyana Fairmaire, 1901
- Macrotoma castaneipennis Kolbe, 1894
- Macrotoma coelaspis White, 1853
- Macrotoma delahayei Bouyer, 2010
- Macrotoma drumonti Bouyer, 2011
- Macrotoma ducarmei Bouyer, 2016
- Macrotoma gerstaeckeri Lameere, 1903
- Macrotoma hassoni Bouyer, 2016
- Macrotoma hayesii (Hope, 1833)
- Macrotoma legalli Delahaye, 2015
- Macrotoma hayesii (Hope, 1833)
- Macrotoma mourgliai Bouyer, 2010
- Macrotoma natala (Thomson, 1860)
- Macrotoma palmata Fabricius, 1792
- Macrotoma prionopus White, 1853
- Macrotoma serripes (Fabricius, 1778)
- Macrotoma vandeweghei Bouyer, 2016

== Gallery ==
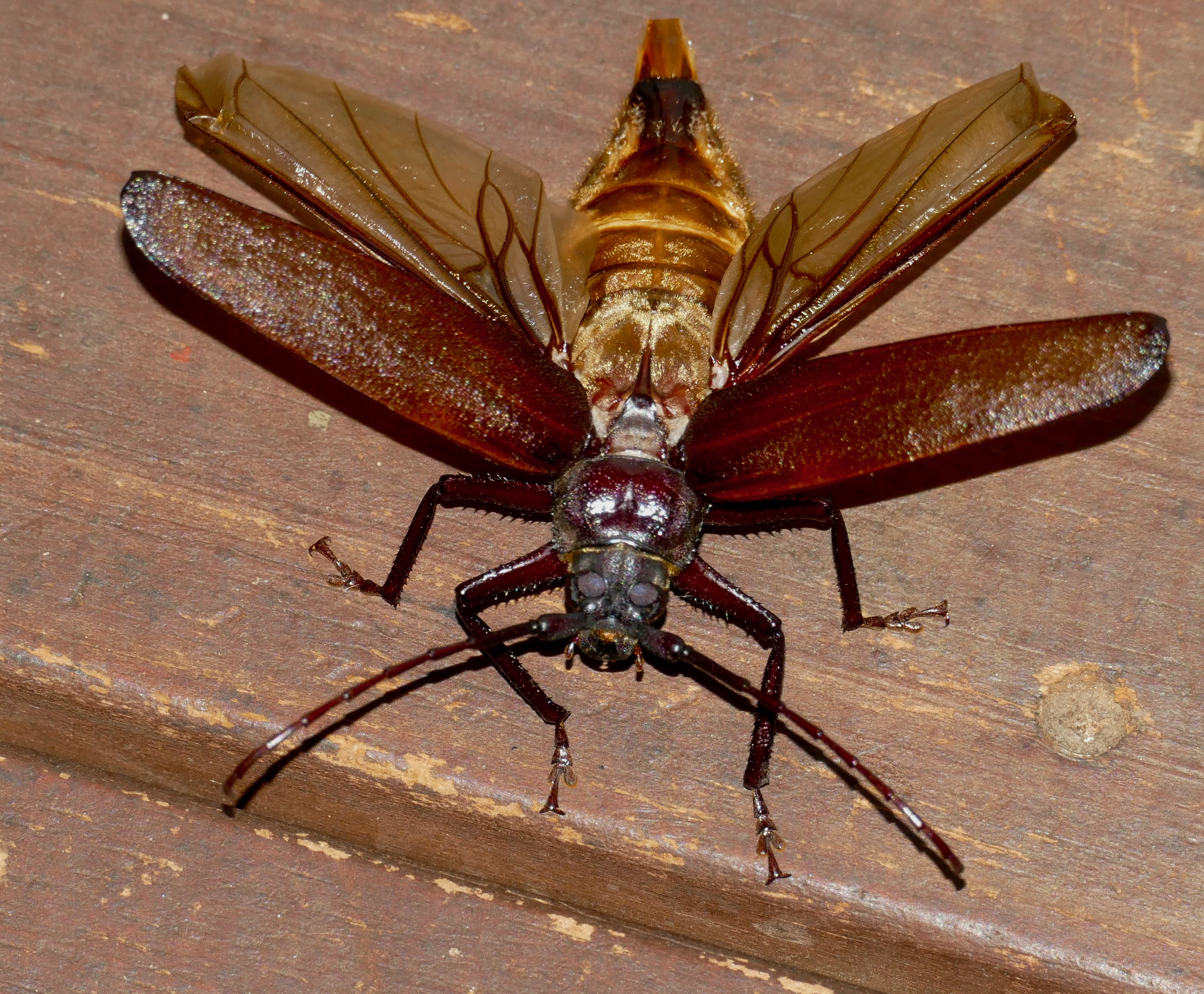
Macrotoma natala

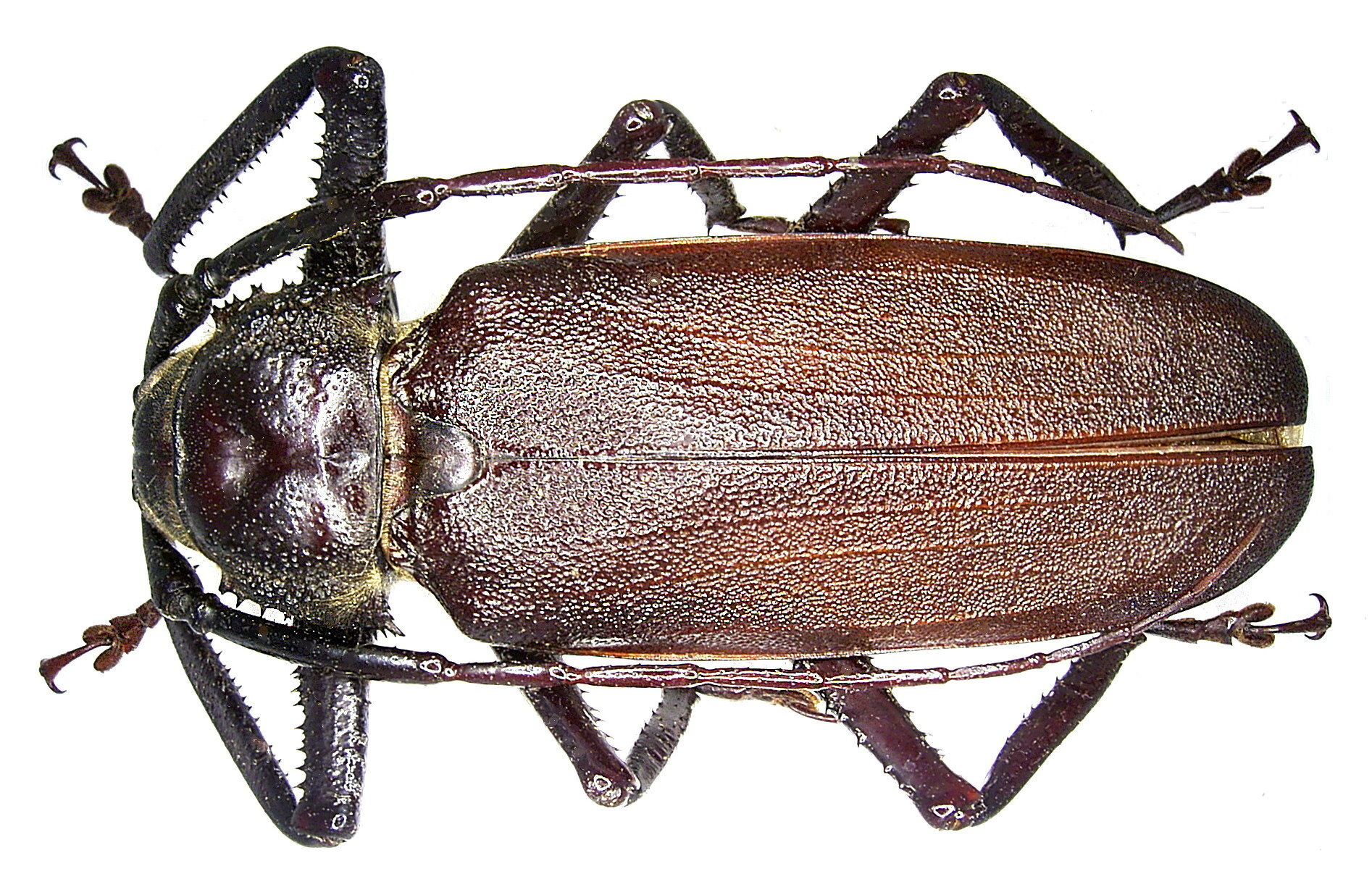
Male Macrotoma natala

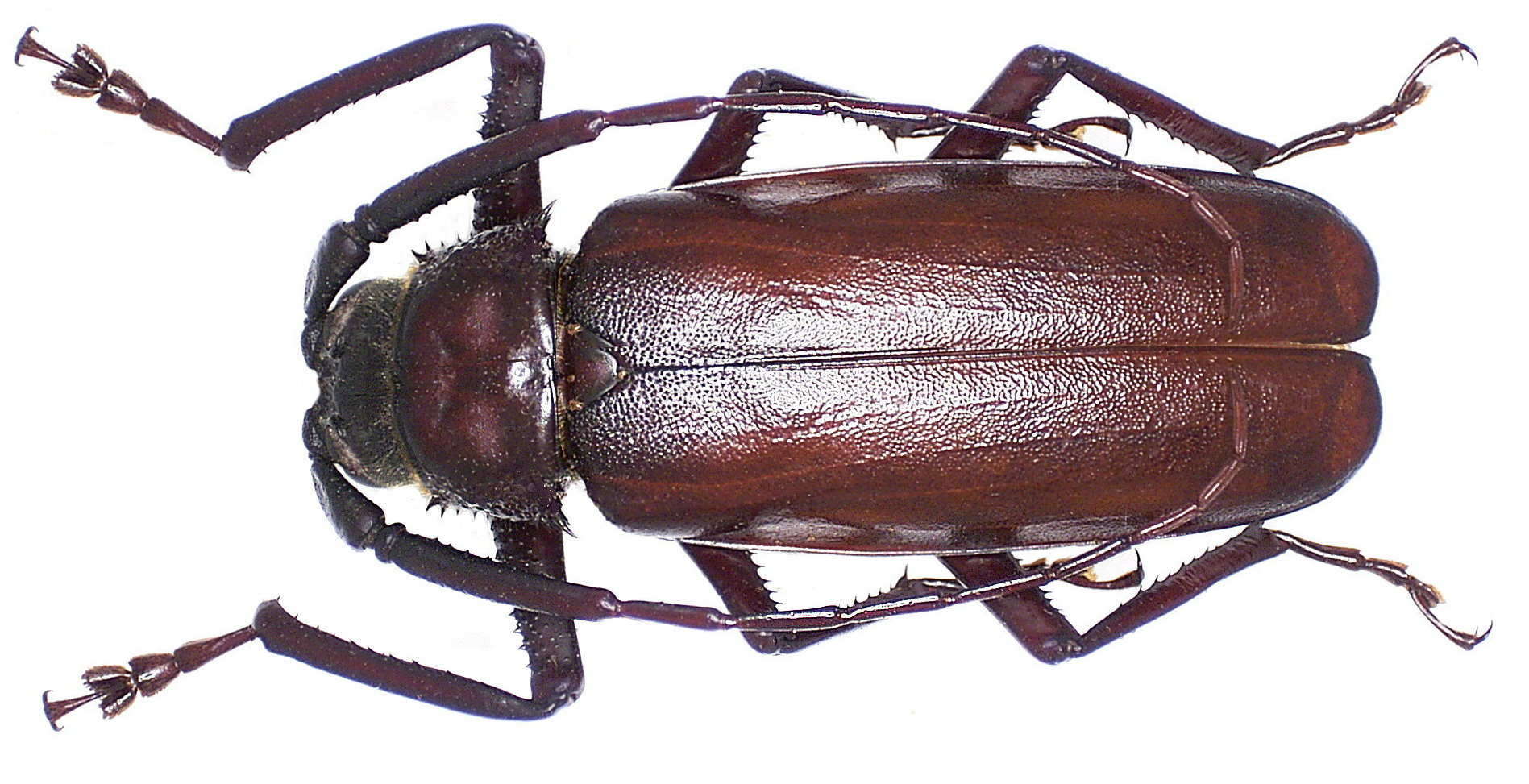
Male Macrotoma palmata
