= Enteromius brevidorsalis =

Conservation status
- Least Concern (IUCN 3.1)

Scientific classification
- Domain: Eukaryota
- Kingdom: Animalia
- Phylum: Chordata
- Class: Actinopterygii
- Order: Cypriniformes
- Family: Cyprinidae
- Subfamily: Smiliogastrinae
- Genus: Enteromius
- Species: E. brevidorsalis

Binomial name
- Enteromius brevidorsalis (Boulenger, 1915)

Synonyms
- Barbus puellus Nichols & Boulton, 1927; Barbus brevidorsalis Boulenger, 1915

Species of fish

Enteromius brevidorsalis (dwarf barb) is a species of ray-finned fish in the genus Enteromius which occurs in southern central Africa in the upper Zambezi basin and nearby rivers.

== Footnotes ==
- Froese, Rainer; Pauly, Daniel (eds.). "Enteromius brevidorsalis". FishBase.
